= 2023–24 FC Kremin Kremenchuk season =

21st season in existence of Kremin FC

Kremin
2023–24 season
- President: Serhii Kovnir
- Head coach: Ihor Klymovskyi
- Stadium: Kremin Arena
- Ukrainian First League: 18th
- Ukrainian Cup: Second preliminary round
- Top goalscorer: League: Simon Galoyan (4); All: Simon Galoyan (4)
- Biggest win: 4–1 vs Hirnyk-Sport (H), 20 October 2023, First League
- Biggest defeat: 0–6 vs Poltava (H), 28 August 2023, First League; 0–6 vs Livyi Bereh (A), 17 September 2023, First League

The 2023–24 season was Kremin's 21st year in existence since clubs revival in 2003 and 5th consecutive season in the second flight of Ukrainian football. In addition to the domestic league, Kremin participated in that season's editions of the Ukrainian Cup.

== Season summary ==
=== Pre-season ===
On 9 June 2023 assistant manager Valeriy Kutsenko after left the club to become a new manager at neighboring club FC Hirnyk-Sport Horishni Plavni. Viktor Pylypenko and Dmytro Ulianko also left the club. Pylypenko joined the club in 2019 and played in 28 matches. Ulianko did not feature in any first team matches, making 16 appearances for junior team Kremin-2.

On 19 June Kremin players returned to training to prepare for the new season. 21 footballers took part in training, including 3 players on trial. From 19 June to 1 July the team took part in double training sessions on Polytechnic and Naftokhimik statiums. Other training sessions were planned for 4 to 16 July and 18 to 23 July.

On 20 June Dmytro Nazarenko joined the club as a new assistant manager from Vast Mykolaiv on a two-year contract. Vladyslav Molko and Oleksandr Kalchuk joined neighboring club Hirnyk-Sport on a season-long loan.

On 21 June goalkeeper coach Roman Chumak left the club after his contract expired. He worked at the club for one year, having previously played for Kremin in 2007–2012.

On 24 June Kremin held its first training match. It was played on Polytechnic Stadium. Players were split into two teams and played three halves of twenty minutes. A Metalist 1925 Kharkiv player Mykhaylo Shershen also took part in the game. He was training with Kremin to maintain his form.

On 28 June Kremin played its first friendly match against a Premier League club Kryvbas. The match ended in a 3:1 loss. Kremin featured a number of on-trial players. Artem Piatybrat scored the goal for Kremin.

On 1 July Davronbek Azizov, Orest Panchyshyn and Andrii Savitskyi signed a one-year contract extension.

On 3 July after returning from loan to Metalist Kharkiv, Daniil Yermolov signed for Premier League club Vorskla Poltava. He joined Kremin in September 2021 and played in 17 matches.

On 7 July Kyrylo Matvyeyev left the club to join Karpaty Lviv. He joined Kremin in August 2022, played in 20 matches and scored three goals.

On 8 July Kremin played its second match against a First League club Inhulets. Kremin lost 2:1 and Andrii Hloba scored.

On 9 July Denys Halata left on season long loan to Metalurh Zaporizhzhia. He joined Kremin in August 2020, played in 61 matches and scored 19 goals.

On 10 July Danylo Falkovskyi left to join Metalurh Zaporizhzhia. He joined Kremin in August 2022, played in 22 matches and scored three goals.

Third friendly game was played on 15 July. Kremin won 1:0 against Hirnyk-Sport. Newly signed defender Yevheniy Kostyuk scored the only goal in the game.

On 16 July goalkeeper Ivan Muzychka announced that he decided to end his footballing career. He joined Kremin in August 2022 and played in 15 matches, eight matches for the Kremin main team and seven for its reserve side Kremin-2. Defender Vladyslav Bondar decided to take a break from playing football due to health problems. Bondar joined Kremin in September 2022. He played in 8 matches, six matches for the Kremin main team and two for its reserve side Kremin-2. Another friendly match was played with Oleksandriya. Kremin lost 2:1 with Myroslav Trofymiuk scoring for the club.

Serhii Karpov joined the club on 17 July 2023 as a goalkeeping coach. Previous season he was employed by Nyva Ternopil. Karpov signed a one-year contract with the club.

Kremin won their last game of preseason on 22 July. Match with Kolos ended in a 1:0 win. Azizov was the goal scorer.

Artem Tovkach, Simon Haloyan and Andrii Hloba signed new one-year contracts on 24 July after their previous contracts ended.

=== August ===
Dmytro Lunin, Head of Poltava Oblast Military Administration banned all mass event from 21 August. Due to that order, Kremin-Poltava game scheduled for 27 August was postponed for a day.

=== September ===
On 24 September manager Roman Loktionov submitted his resignation, which was accepted by the club owner. Loktionov was offered a manager position at Kremin's second team Kremin-2 which he accepted. On 27 September Ihor Klymovskyi was appointed new manager. He signed a one and a half year long contract. Klymovskyi brought with him recently released Lokomotyv Kyiv manager Ruslan Umanets as his assistant. He also kept Dmytro Nazarenko as assistant and Serhii Karpov as a goalkeeper coach.

=== November ===
Players were given a short holiday starting 26 November with plans to get back to training on 11 December. On 27 November goalkeeping coach Serhii Karpov and coach Dmytro Nazarenko terminated their contracts and joined former manager Roman Loktionov at Kudrivka. Next day it was reported that Vladyslav Molko and Oleksandr Kalchuk returned from their loan to Hirnyk-Sport Horishni Plavni earlier than anticipated.

=== December ===
On 11 December twenty-eight main team players and some players from Kremin-2 returned to training. Vladyslav Molko and Oleksandr Kalchuk who were on loan to Hirnyk-Sport Horishni Plavni returned to the club. Four trial players joined the squad. Club also announced that midfielders Dmytro Kasimov and Andrii Kireiev left the club by mutual agreement.

=== January ===
On 16 January Sport.ua reported that seven players were on trial with Kremin. Artem Umanets son of assistant manager Ruslan Umanets will join the club. Other trail players were Ivan Palamarchuk and Nigerian Michael Obamina. Other trial players were Dmytro Humeniak, Dmytro Diianchuk, Vladyslav Lohovskyi, Vladyslav Molko, Nazarii Pasternak and Ivan Kuts. On 21 January club signed the former manager Yuriy Chumak as a goalkeeping coach on a two-year contract.

=== February ===
Palamarchuk and Pasternak signed two-year contracts with the club. Arsenii Korkodym joined on loan from Veres Rivne until end of season. Michael Obamina also joined on a two-year contract.

=== March ===
On 1 March the club announced that forward Ivan Kuts returned to the club for his third spell. Artem Umanets son of assistant manager Ruslan Umanets also joined the club.

On 6 March it was reported that Denys Halata will spend the year with Latvian Higher League club Grobiņas.

== Management team ==
On 24 September manager Roman Loktionov stepped down and was replaced by Ihor Klymovskyi on the 27 September. On 27 November goalkeeping coach Serhii Karpov and coach Dmytro Nazarenko left the club.

Position	Name	Year appointed	Last club/team	References
Manager	(Ukraine) Ihor Klymovskyi	2023	DYuSSh Zmina Bila Tserkva	
Assistant Coach	(Ukraine) Dmytro Nazarenko	2023	Vast Mykolaiv	
Goalkeeping Coach	(Ukraine) Yuriy Chumak	2024		

== Players ==
=== Squad information ===
Players and squad numbers last updated on 28 August 2023. Appearances include all competitions.
Note: Flags indicate national team as has been defined under FIFA eligibility rules. Players may hold more than one non-FIFA nationality.

No.	Player	Nat.	Position(s)	Date of birth (age)	Signed in	Contract ends	Signed from	Transfer fee	Apps.	Goals
Goalkeepers
40	Stanislav Oksenenko (K-2)	(Ukraine)	GK	25 April 2006 (age 19)	2022		(Ukraine) FC Kremin Kremenchuk Academy	N/A	2	0
57	Oleksii Slutskyi (K-2)	(Ukraine)	GK	2 June 2002 (age 23)	2023	2025	(Ukraine) FC Obolon Kyiv	N/A	1	0
71	Artem Matus	(Ukraine)	GK	12 June 2003 (age 22)	2023	2025	(Ukraine) Epitsentr	N/A	0	0
Defenders
14	Yevheniy Kostyuk	(Ukraine)	LB	28 January 2002 (age 24)	2023	2025	(Ukraine) Kolos	N/A	0	0
16	Davronbek Azizov	(Ukraine)	LB / CM	13 July 2000 (age 25)	2022	2024	(Ukraine) Sokil Kharkiv	N/A	19	4
19	Dmytro Sabiiev (K-2)	(Ukraine)	CB	5 July 2004 (age 21)	2023	2026	(Ukraine) Zirka	N/A	0	0
29	Oleksandr Dykhtiaruk (K-2)	(Ukraine)	CB / CM	15 January 2003 (age 23)	2023	2025	(Ukraine) Chornomorets	N/A	0	0
33	Danylo Sydorenko	(Ukraine)	CB	18 February 1999 (age 27)	2022	2024	(Ukraine) OKVP Dnipro-Kirivihrad	N/A	16	0
35	Artem Tovkach	(Ukraine)	RB	30 December 2002 (age 23)	2021	2024	(Ukraine) Zorya Luhansk	N/A	24	1
41	Yurii Dudnyk (K-2)	(Ukraine)	CB	12 September 2002 (age 23)	2023	2025	(Czech Republic) Baník Sokolov	N/A	0	0
43	Denys Kuriakov (K-2)	(Ukraine)	CB	2 March 2003 (age 23)	2023		(Ukraine) Kremin-2 Kremenchuk	N/A	0	0
44	Nazar Hontar (K-2)	(Ukraine)	LB	12 May 2004 (age 21)	2023		(Ukraine) Kremin-2 Kremenchuk	N/A	0	0
49	Illia Rudniev (K-2)	(Ukraine)		9 February 2001 (age 25)	2023		(Ukraine) Kremin-2 Kremenchuk	N/A	0	0
72	Roman Tylokha	(Ukraine)	RB	26 January 2003 (age 23)	2023	2025	(Ukraine) Zirka Kropyvnytskyi	N/A	0	0
91	Danylo Arkusha	(Ukraine)	CB	24 November 2001 (age 24)	2022	2025	(Ukraine) Zirka Kropyvnytskyi	N/A	17	0
Midfielders
6	Andrii Kireiev	(Ukraine)	CM	27 September 2001 (age 24)	2023	2025	(Ukraine) Dnipro-1	N/A	4	0
8	Orest Panchyshyn	(Ukraine)	DM / CM	30 August 2000 (age 25)	2021		(Ukraine) Mynai	N/A	32	2
9	Artem Piatybrat (K-2)	(Ukraine)	RM	16 September 2004 (age 21)	2022		(Ukraine) FC Kremin Kremenchuk Academy	N/A	3	0
10	Andrii Savitskyi	(Ukraine)	CM	9 December 2001 (age 24)	2022	2023	(Ukraine) Vovchansk	N/A	19	1
11	Simon Haloyan	(Ukraine)	CM / RW	7 February 2002 (age 24)	2021	2024	(Ukraine) Obolon Kyiv	N/A	38	1
15	Yakiv Barinov	(Ukraine)	CM	14 February 2003 (age 23)	2023	2026	(Ukraine) DYuFSh Vorskla Poltava	N/A	0	0
17	Oleksii Zhdanovych (K-2)	(Ukraine)	CM	27 September 2003 (age 22)	2022	2025	(Ukraine) Zirka Kropyvnytskyi	N/A	2	0
20	Stanislav Rokotyanskyik (K-2)	(Ukraine)	ST	29 July 2003 (age 22)	2023	2025	(Ukraine) Metalurh-2	N/A	0	0
24	Andrii Hloba	(Ukraine)	LW	24 January 1999 (age 27)	2022	2024	(Ukraine) Sumy	N/A	14	2
51	Zlat Zlatyev (K-2)	(Ukraine)	RB / LB	16 May 2002 (age 23)	2023	2025	(Ukraine) Metalurh-2	N/A	0	0
77	Dmytro Kasimov	(Ukraine)	RW	14 August 1999 (age 26)	2023	2024	(Ukraine) Mynai	N/A	6	0
Forwards
7	Myroslav Trofymiuk	(Ukraine)	ST	8 April 2001 (age 25)	2023	2025	(Ukraine) Unatached	N/A	0	0
47	Anatolii Stetsiuk (K-2)	(Ukraine)	ST	1 April 2005 (age 21)	2023		(Ukraine) Kremin-2 Kremenchuk	N/A	0	0
88	Oleksandr Vivdych	(Ukraine)	ST	22 February 2003 (age 23)	2022	2024	(Ukraine) Oleksandriya	N/A	22	4

Notes:

- Player (K-2) – Player who was registered by Kremin as a Kremin-2 player for the 2023–24 Ukrainian Second League.

== Transfers ==
=== In ===
Date	No.	Pos.	Player	From	Transfer fee	Source
14 July 2023		GK	(Ukraine) Artem Matus	(Ukraine) Epitsentr	N/A	
14 July 2023		DF	(Ukraine) Dmytro Sabiiev	(Ukraine) Zirka	N/A	
14 July 2023		DF	(Ukraine) Yevhenii Kostiuk	(Ukraine) Kolos	N/A	
14 July 2023		MF	(Ukraine) Stanislav Rokotyanskyi	(Ukraine) Metalurh-2	N/A	
14 July 2023		MF	(Ukraine) Zlat Zlatiev	(Ukraine) Metalurh-2	N/A	
February 2024	21	MF	(Ukraine) Ivan Palamarchuk	(Ukraine) Bukovyna Chernivtsi	N/A	
February 2024	18	MF	(Ukraine) Nazarii Pasternak	(Ukraine) UCSA Tarasivka	N/A	
February 2024	30	MF	(Nigeria) Michael Obamina	(Ukraine) Rukh-2 Lviv	N/A	
February 2024	55	FW	(Ukraine) Ivan Kuts	(Ukraine) Rokyta	N/A	

=== Out ===
Date	No.	Pos.	Player	To	Transfer fee	Source
3 July 2023	69	GK	(Ukraine) Daniil Yermolov	(Ukraine) Vorskla Poltava	N/A	
7 July 2023	14	MF	(Ukraine) Kyrylo Matvieiev	(Ukraine) Karpaty Lviv	N/A	
10 July 2023	21	MF	(Ukraine) Danylo Falkovskyi	(Ukraine) Metalurh Zaporizhzhia	N/A	
16 July 2023	1	GK	(Ukraine) Ivan Muzychka	Retired	N/A	
16 July 2023	29	DF	(Ukraine) Vladyslav Bondar	Pause due to health	N/A	
	4	DF	(Ukraine) Viktor Pylypenko	(Ukraine) Rokyta	N/A	
	72	DF	(Ukraine) Maksym Ahapov		N/A	
	15	MF	(Ukraine) Dmytro Ulianko	(Ukraine) Maramuresh Nyzhnia Apsha	N/A	
December 2023	6	MF	(Ukraine) Andrii Kireiev	(Ukraine) UCSA Tarasivka	N/A	
December 2023	77	MF	(Ukraine) Dmytro Kasimov	(Ukraine) Ahrobiznes Volochysk	N/A	
	9	MF	(Ukraine) Artem Piatybrat	(Ukraine) Lokomotyv Kyiv	N/A	
19 February 2024	46	DF	(Ukraine) Oleksandr Kalchuk	(Ukraine) Chaika Petropavlivska Borshchahivka	N/A	
7 March 2024	57	GK	(Ukraine) Oleksii Slutskyi	(Ukraine) Chaika Petropavlivska Borshchahivka	N/A	

=== Loans in ===
Date	No.	Pos.	Player	From	On loan until	Transfer fee	Source
February 2024	9	MF	(Ukraine) Artem Umanets	(Ukraine) Vorskla Poltava	End of season	N/A	
27 February 2024	78	GK	(Ukraine) Arsenii Korkodym	(Ukraine) Veres Rivne	End of season	N/A	

=== Loans out ===
- Date^{‡} – Loan was originally scheduled to last to until end of the season but was curtailed.

Date	No.	Pos.	Player	Loaned to	On loan until	Transfer fee	Source
20 June 2023	19	MF	(Ukraine) Vladyslav Molko	(Ukraine) Hirnyk-Sport Horishni Plavni	November 2023^{‡}	N/A	
20 June 2023	46	DF	(Ukraine) Oleksandr Kalchuk	(Ukraine) Hirnyk-Sport Horishni Plavni	November 2023^{‡}	N/A	
9 July 2023	20	FW	(Ukraine) Denys Halata	(Ukraine) Metalurh Zaporizhzhia	February 2024^{‡}	N/A	
February 2024	20	FW	(Ukraine) Denys Halata	(Latvia) Grobiņas	End of season	N/A	

== Pre-season and friendlies ==
Win Draw Loss Fixtures

On 19 June Kremin announced five away preseason fixtures against Kryvbas, Inhulets, Hirnyk-Sport, Oleksandriya and Kolos. During the winter break Kremin took part in Winter Cup of Football Association of Poltava Oblast. They were drawn into Group B with Kolos Velyki Sorochyntsi, Hirnyk-Sport, Rokyta and Olimpiya Savyntsi. Teams faced each opponent once, two top teams moved on to semi-final.

Results list Kremin's goal tally first.

Date	Opponent	Venue	Result	Kremin scorers	Referee
28 June 2023 – 17:00	Kryvbas	Away	1–3	Piatybrat 6'	Anatolii Ukhov
8 July 2023 – 14:00	Kryvbas	Away	1–2	Hloba 20'	
15 July 2023 – 14:00	Hirnyk-Sport	Away	1–0	Kostiuk 76'	
16 July 2023 – 11:00	Oleksandriia	Away	1–2	Trofymiuk 44'	
22 July 2023 – 13:00	Kolos	Away	1–0	Azizov 55'	
24 January 2024 – 12:00	Kolos Velyki Sorochyntsi	Home	3–1	Pasternak 23', Kuts 38', Trofymiuk 85'	
31 January 2024 – 12:00	Hirnyk-Sport	Home	5–1	Trofymiuk 16', Galoyan 25', Palamarchuk32', Arkusha 40', Kuts 68'	
3 February 2024 – 12:00	Olimpiya Savyntsi	Home	4–1	Kuts 29' (pen.), Trofymiuk 46', 66', Dudnyk 76'	Viktor Chernyshov
6 February 2024 – 13:00	Inhulets Petrove	Home	1–3	Kuts 80' (pen.)	Oleksandr Holovkov
10 February 2024 – 14:00	Rokyta	Home	3–3	Obamina 27', Savitskyi 44', Trofymiuk 70'	Viktor Chernyhov
16 February 2024 – 13:00	Trostianets	Molodizhnyi Stadium	4–1	Galoyan 22', Kuts 37', Arkusha 83', Trofymiuk 90'	Vladyslav Orendochka
20 February 2024 – 13:45	Inhulets Petrove	Home	2–3	Hloba 34', Galoyan 39'	Oleksandr Holovkov
4 March 2024 – 13:00	Oleksandriya	Away	0–2		Yehor Kievlich
9 March 2024 – 12:30	Poltava	Away	0–4		Vladyslav Orendochka

== Competitions ==
=== Overall record ===
Competition	First match	Last match	Starting round	Final position	Record							
Competition	First match	Last match	Starting round	Final position	Pld	W	D	L	GF	GA	GD	Win %
First League	28 July 2023	25 May 2024	Matchday 1	18th	28	6	7	15	20	48	−28	21.43
Ukrainian Cup	2 August 2023		Second preliminary round	Second preliminary round	1	0	0	1	0	3	−3	0.00
Total					29	6	7	16	20	51	−31	20.69

Source: Competitions

=== First League ===
==== Results summary ====
Overall								Home						Away					
Pld	W	D	L	GF	GA	GD	Pts	W	D	L	GF	GA	GD	W	D	L	GF	GA	GD
28	6	7	15	20	48	−28	25	3	5	6	9	18	−9	3	2	9	11	30	−19

Source: ua-football.com

==== League table ====
Pos	Team	Pld	W	D	L	GF	GA	GD	Pts	Promotion, qualification or relegation
6	Metalurh Zaporizhzhia	18	6	7	5	23	18	+5	25	Qualified to the Relegation group
7	Hirnyk-Sport Horishni Plavni	18	5	2	11	16	32	−16	17	Qualified to the Relegation group
8	Kremin Kremenchuk	18	4	2	12	14	40	−26	14	Qualified to the Relegation group
9	Chernihiv-ShVSM	18	4	1	13	20	44	−24	13 (Note: Head-to-head points: Chernihiv 6, Dinaz 0)	Qualified to the Relegation group
10	Dinaz Vyshhorod	18	3	4	11	15	28	−13	13	Qualified to the Relegation group

Source: PFL.ua
Rules for classification: 1) Points; 2) Head-to-head points; 3) Head-to-head goal difference; 4) Head-to-head goals scored; 5) Goal difference in all games; 6) Goals scored in all games (Note: calculation by criteria indicated in rules 2, 3, 4 is conducted with consideration of all teams that have an equal number of tournament points at the moment of calculation and not only among those which after preliminary criteria have appeared more successful).

==== Relegation Group table ====
Pos	Team	Pld	W	D	L	GF	GA	GD	Pts	Promotion, qualification or relegation
16	Khust	28	9	2	17	34	53	−19	29	Qualification to relegation play-off (both later avoided relegation)
17	Metalurh Zaporizhzhia	28	7	7	14	27	48	−21	28	Qualification to relegation play-off (both later avoided relegation)
18	Kremin Kremenchuk	28	6	7	15	20	48	−28	25	Avoided relegation
19	Chernihiv-ShVSM (R)	28	6	5	17	34	66	−32	23 (Note: Head-to-head points: Chernihiv 6, Hirnyk-Sport 0)	Relegation to Ukrainian Second League
20	Hirnyk-Sport Horishni Plavni (R)	28	6	5	17	24	49	−25	23	Relegation to Ukrainian Second League

Source: PFL.ua
Rules for classification: 1) Points; 2) Head-to-head points; 3) Head-to-head goal difference; 4) Head-to-head goals scored; 5) Goal difference in all games; 6) Goals scored in all games (Note: calculation by criteria indicated in rules 2, 3, 4 is conducted with consideration of all teams that have an equal number of tournament points at the moment of calculation and not only among those which after preliminary criteria have appeared more successful).
(R) Relegated

==== Matches ====
Win Draw Loss Fixtures

==== Group B ====
The league fixtures were announced on 6 August 2023.

Results list Kremin's goal tally first.

Date	Opponent	Venue	Result	Kremin scorers	Referee	Attendance	Position
28 July 2023 – 14:00	Metalurh	Away	0–0		Yehor Kievkich		6th
7 August 2023 – 16:00	Dinaz	Away	1–2	Savitskyi 90+3'	Pavlo Detsiuk		9th
11 August 2023 – 15:00	Viktoriia	Home	0–1		Yehor Kievkich		10th
19 August 2023 – 15:30	Hirnyk-Sport	Away	1–0	Hloba 40'	Ivan Salash		th
28 August 2023 – 16:15	Poltava	Home	0–6		Serhii Podryhulia		th
2 September 2023 – 12:00	Chernihiv	Away	3–2	Savitskyi 45', Trofymiuk 52', 90'	Anatolii Ukhov		th
8 September 2023 – 16:00	Inhulets	Home	0–2		Yaroslav Leskiv		th
17 September 2023 – 16:00	Livyi Bereh	Away	0–6		Vasyl Faida		th
23 September 2023 – 15:00	Mariupol	Home	0–3		Vitalii Maliar		th
1 October 2023 – 12:30	Metalurh	Home	1–2	Azizov 90+2'	Andrii Zaitsev		th
7 October 2023 – 12:00	Dinaz	Home	0–0		Myroslav Lypko		th
13 October 2023 – 13:30	Viktoriia	Away	0–3		Dmytro Kuzovliev		th
20 October 2023 – 12:00	Hirnyk-Sport	Home	4–1	Galoyan 15', 74, Zhdanovych 32', Trofymiuk 52'	Kateryna Usova		th
29 October 2023 – 14:00	Poltava	Away	1–4	Galoyan 4'	Vitalii Maliar		th
3 November 2023 – 12:30	Chernihiv	Home	2–1	Kireiev 61', Azizov71' (pen.)	Yaroslav Leskiv		th
12 November 2023 – 13:00	Inhulets	Away	1–5	Galoyan 50'	Oleksandr Tytov		th
19 November 2023 – 12:00	Livyi Bereh	Home	0–1		Pavlo Detsiuk		th
25 November 2023 – 12:00	Mariupol	Away	0–1		Liudmyla Telbukh		8th

==== Relegation group ====
The league fixtures were announced on 15 December 2023.

Results list Kremin's goal tally first.

Date	Opponent	Venue	Result	Kremin scorers	Referee	Attendance	Position
24 March 2024 – 12:00	Metalist	Home	0–0		Ihor Stashuk		17th
29 March 2024 – 12:30	Podillya	Away	1–3	Hloba 9'	Andrii Zaitsev	200	19th
5 April 2024 – 12:30	Bukovyna	Home	0–0		Yevhen Tsybulko	0	19th
14 April 2024 – 13:30	Khust	Away	0–1		Myroslav Lypko	0	19th
21 April 2024 – 14:15	Nyva Ternopil	Home	0–0		Anatolii Ukhov	0	20th
26 April 2024 – 12:30	Metalist	Away	1–2	Kuts 19'	Sofiia Prychyna	50	20th
3 May 2024 – 13:30	Podillya	Home	1–1	Kuts 4'	Kristina Kozoroh	0	19th
12 May 2024 – 14:15	Bukovyna	Away	1–0	Novotriasov 26' (o.g.)	Oleh Kohut	1400	19th
19 May 2024 – 13:00	Khust	Home	1–0	Sydorenko 68'	Yevhen Tsybulko	0	18th
25 May 2024 – 13:00	Nyva Ternopil	Away	1–1	Kuts 73' (pen.)	Serhii Truba	300	18th

=== Ukrainian Cup ===
Kremin will enter the Second preliminary round and will play against the winner of match with Olimpiya Savyntsi and Kudrivka. Match is scheduled to be played on 2 August.

Win Draw Loss Fixtures

Date	Opponent	Venue	Result	Kremin scorers	Referee
2 August 2023 – 18:00	Kudrivka	Away	0–3		Kateryna Usova

== Statistics ==
=== Appearances and goals ===
As of 25 November 2023

The plus (+) symbol denotes an appearance as a substitute, hence 2+1 indicates two appearances in the starting XI and one appearance as a substitute. Players with zero appearances were unused substitutes named in at least one matchday squad.

No.	Pos	Nat	Player	Total		First League		Cup	
No.	Pos	Nat	Player	Apps	Goals	Apps	Goals	Apps	Goals
7	FW	(Ukraine) UKR	Myroslav Trofymiuk	18	3	17+1	3	-	-
8	MF	(Ukraine) UKR	Orest Panchyshyn	17	0	17	0	-	-
10	MF	(Ukraine) UKR	Andrii Savitskyi	17	2	17	2	-	-
11	MF	(Ukraine) UKR	Simon Galoyan	19	4	16+2	4	1	0
12	MF	(Ukraine) UKR	Kostiantyn Pihariev	1	0	-	-	0+1	-
14	DF	(Ukraine) UKR	Yevheniy Kostyuk	10	0	7+3	0	-	-
15	MF	(Ukraine) UKR	Yakiv Barinov	0	0	0	0	-	-
16	DF	(Ukraine) UKR	Davronbek Azizov	15	2	14+1	2	-	-
17	MF	(Ukraine) UKR	Oleksii Zhdanovych	16	1	12+3	1	1	0
19	DF	(Ukraine) UKR	Dmytro Sabiiev	1	0	0	0	1	0
20	MF	(Ukraine) UKR	Stanislav Rokotyanskyi	7	0	1+5	0	1	0
24	MF	(Ukraine) UKR	Andrii Hloba	17	1	14+3	1	-	-
25	MF	(Ukraine) UKR	Mykhailo Klepko	1	0	-	-	0+1	0
26	MF	(Ukraine) UKR	Dmytro Pokas	-1	0	-	-	1	0
28	MF	(Ukraine) UKR	Vadym Kurylo	1	0	-	-	0+1	0
29	DF	(Ukraine) UKR	Oleksandr Dykhtiaruk	12	0	0+11	0	1	0
32	MF	(Ukraine) UKR	Ivan Zaichenko	1	0	-	-	0+1	0
33	DF	(Ukraine) UKR	Danylo Sydorenko	17	0	17	0	-	-
35	DF	(Ukraine) UKR	Artem Tovkach	17	0	15+2	0	-	-
40	GK	(Ukraine) UKR	Stanislav Oksenenko	3	0	2	0	1	0
41	DF	(Ukraine) UKR	Yurii Dudnyk	15	0	12+3	0	-	-
43	DF	(Ukraine) UKR	Denys Kuriakov	0	0	-	-	-	-
44	DF	(Ukraine) UKR	Nazar Hontar	-1	0	-	-	1	0
47	FW	(Ukraine) UKR	Anatolii Stetsiuk	1	0	-	-	0+1	0
51	MF	(Ukraine) UKR	Zlat Zlatyev	2	0	0+1	0	1	0
71	GK	(Ukraine) UKR	Artem Matus	12	0	12	0	-	-
72	DF	(Ukraine) UKR	Roman Tylokha	0	0	0	0	-	-
91	DF	(Ukraine) UKR	Danylo Arkusha	12	0	8+4	0	-	-
Players have left the club
6	MF	(Ukraine) UKR	Andrii Kireiev	13	1	5+8	1	-	-
9	MF	(Ukraine) UKR	Artem Piatybrat	10	0	1+8	0	1	0
49	DF	(Ukraine) UKR	Illia Rudniev						
57	GK	(Ukraine) UKR	Oleksii Slutskyi	4	0	4	0	0	0
77	MF	(Ukraine) UKR	Dmytro Kasimov	10	0	5+5	0	-	-
88	FW	(Ukraine) UKR	Oleksandr Vivdych	6	0	1+4	0	1	0

Last updated: 25 November 2023
Source: []
