= 2022–23 Ukrainian Second League =

Ukrainian Second League
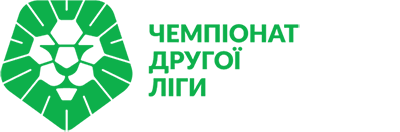
- Season: 2022–23
- Dates: 3 September 2022 – 27 May 2023 (winter break: 8 November 2022 – 7 April 2023)
- Champions: Nyva Buzova
- Promoted: Nyva Buzova; Khust
- Relegated: Rubikon Kyiv (withdrew)
- Matches: 70
- Goals: 203 (2.9 per match)
- Top goalscorer: Artur Zahorulko (14 goals)
- Biggest home win: Vast 5–0 Kremin-2 (5 September 2022); Nyva B 5–0 Rubikon (23 October 2022)
- Biggest away win: Rubikon 0–7 Real Pharma (30 September 2022)
- Highest scoring: Rubikon 0–7 Real Pharma (30 September 2022)
- Longest winning run: Nyva B (9 games)
- Longest unbeaten run: Nyva B (9 games)
- Longest winless run: Kremin-2 (8 games)
- Longest losing run: Rubikon (7 games)
- Total attendance: 0
- Average attendance: 0
- All statistics correct as of 30 April 2023.

The 2022–23 Ukrainian Second League was the 32nd since its establishment.

== Summary ==
Due to Russo-Ukrainian War, the Professional Football League of Ukraine (PFL) lost some 24 clubs. Out of 31 teams of the last season, only 4 remained for this season. The Second League was replenished with some teams from national amateur competitions as well as some clubs added their reserve teams. Unlike the last season, this season consisted of a single group of 10 with a standard double round-robin tournament. The top team would receive a direct promotion, while the runner-up contest promotion with the second to the last from the First League.

With occupation of Kherson Oblast, the Russian occupational administration announced to create own club (Fregat) in place of FC Krystal Kherson. However, after the 2022 Kherson counteroffensive, the story did not get any continuation.

== Teams ==
=== Promoted teams ===
Four teams have been promoted from the 2021–22 Ukrainian Football Amateur League:

- Nyva Buzova – 1st place of Group 2 (debut)
- Zviahel – 6th place of Group 2 (debut)
- Metalurh-2 Zaporizhzhia – 2nd place of Group 3 (returning after 11 seasons, last competed in the 2011–12 as a reserve team of the bankrupted Metalurh)
- Vast Mykolaiv – 4th place of Group 3 (debut)

One additional reserve team of the First League club and another amateur club were admitted to the league:

- Kremin-2 Kremenchuk – (debut, priorly competed in amateurs in 2019–20)
- Khust – (absolute debut)

=== Relegated teams ===
None, while 14 teams suspended their activities or dissolved.

=== Reorganized/renamed teams ===
- During winter break it was announced Rubikon Kyiv and OKKO Kharkiv signed an agreement on cooperation and in the second half were planning to field a joint team. As a joint team they took part in the Makarov Tournament (conducted by the Kyiv Oblast Association of Football) and reached finals where they lost to Shturm Ivankiv. However in the 2023 PFL Winter Cup competed only OKKO and just before the start of the second half, it was announced that Rubikon withdrew, and its players became free agents.

=== Location map and stadiums ===
Home venues of teams in the 2022–23 Ukrainian Second League

Team	Stadium (Note: Minimum capacity of stadium for the Second League is 500 spectators.)	Position in 2021–22
Nyva Vinnytsia	Tsentralnyi Miskyi Stadion	8th, Group A
Chaika	Livyi Bereh, Kyiv	12th, Group A
Rubikon Kyiv	OFK Piddubnoho	13th, Group A
Real Pharma Odesa	Stadion Ivan	14th, Group B
Nyva Buzova	Yuvileinyi Stadium, Bucha	Am
Zviahel	Avanhard	Am
Metalurh-2 Zaporizhzhia	Slavutych-Arena	Am
Vast Mykolaiv	Dinaz Stadium, Demydiv	Am
Khust	Karpaty	—
Kremin-2 Kremenchuk	Kremin Arena	—

== Managers ==
Club	Head coach	Replaced coach
Chaika Petropavlivska Borshchahivka	(Ukraine) Serhiy Syzykhin	(Ukraine) Denys Khomutov (Ukraine) Ihor Lutsenko (acting)
Khust	(Ukraine) Volodymyr Tsytkin	
Kremin-2 Kremenchuk	(Ukraine) Yaroslav Zdyrko	(Ukraine) Yuriy Chumak
Metalurh-2 Zaporizhzhia	(Ukraine) Vyacheslav Tropin	
Nyva Buzova	(Ukraine) Serhiy Karpenko	
Nyva Vinnytsia	(Ukraine) Oleh Ostapenko	
Real Pharma Odesa	(Ukraine) Andriy Parkhomenko	(Ukraine) Yuriy Kulish
Rubikon Kyiv	(Ukraine) Viktor Kuryata	
Vast Mykolaiv	(Ukraine) Ihor Yermakov	(Ukraine) Dmytro Nazarenko
Zviahel	(Ukraine) Ruslan Skydan	

=== Managerial changes ===
Team	Outgoing head coach	Manner of departure	Date of vacancy	Table	Incoming head coach	Date of appointment
Vast Mykolaiv	(Ukraine) Artem Chorniy	Undisclosed	July 2022	Pre-season	(Ukraine) Dmytro Nazarenko	July 2022
Khust				Pre-season	(Ukraine) Volodymyr Tsytkin	July 2022
Nyva Vinnytsia	(Ukraine) Ihor Leonov	Resigned	spring 2022	Pre-season	(Ukraine) Oleh Ostapenko	28 July 2022
Kremin-2 Kremenchuk				Pre-season	(Ukraine) Yuriy Chumak	August 2022
Real Pharma Odesa	(Ukraine) Artem Ryazantsev	Undisclosed	8 September 2022	Pre-season	(Ukraine) Yuriy Kulish	8 September 2022
Kremin-2 Kremenchuk	(Ukraine) Yuriy Chumak	Mutual consent	10 November 2022	9th	(Ukraine) Yaroslav Zdyrko	14 February 2023
Real Pharma Odesa	(Ukraine) Yuriy Kulish	Mutual consent	18 November 2022	2nd	(Ukraine) Andriy Parkhomenko	18 November 2022
Chaika Petropavlivska Borshchahivka	(Ukraine) Denys Khomutov	"Mutual consent"	26 November 2022	3rd	(Ukraine) Serhiy Syzykhin	26 January 2023
Vast Mykolaiv	(Ukraine) Dmytro Nazarenko	Role change	28 December 2022	7th	(Ukraine) Ihor Yermakov	28 December 2022

== League table ==
Pos	Team	Pld	W	D	L	GF	GA	GD	Pts	Promotion, qualification or relegation
1	Nyva Buzova (C, P)	18	13	3	2	36	8	+28	42	Promotion to Ukrainian First League
2	Khust (O, P)	18	10	5	3	32	15	+17	35 (Note: Head-to-head points: Khust 6, Chaika 5, Nyva V 3)	Qualification to promotional play-off
3	Chaika Petropavlivska Borshchahivka	18	10	5	3	33	20	+13	35	
4	Nyva Vinnytsia	18	10	5	3	29	16	+13	35	
5	Zviahel	18	9	5	4	30	17	+13	32	
6	Real Pharma Odesa	18	9	3	6	27	23	+4	30	
7	Vast Mykolaiv	18	5	2	11	21	28	−7	17	
8	Metalurh-2 Zaporizhzhia	18	4	3	11	23	37	−14	15	
9	Kremin-2 Kremenchuk	18	2	2	14	7	44	−37	8	
10	Rubikon Kyiv (Note: Rubikon Kyiv withdrew after the Round 10. It was awarded technical losses for the rest of its matches.)	18	1	1	16	6	36	−30	4	Withdrew after Round 10

Source: PFL.ua
Rules for classification: 1) Points; 2) Head-to-head points; 3) Head-to-head goal difference; 4) Head-to-head goals scored; 5) Goal difference in all games; 6) Goals scored in all games (Note: calculation by criteria indicated in rules 2, 3, 4 is conducted with consideration of all teams that have equal number of tournament points at the moment of calculation and not only among those which after preliminary criteria have appeared more successful).
(C) Champions; (O) Play-off winners; (P) Promoted

=== Results ===
Home \ Away	CPB	XST	KR2	MT2	NBU	NVI	RPO	RUB	VST	ZVA
Chaika Petropavlivska Borshchahivka		1–2	5–0	1–0	0–4	3–0	3–3	3–0	2–0	2–0
Khust	0–0		4–0	4–0	0–1	1–1	4–0	+:-	5–1	2–2
Kremin-2 Kremenchuk	1–1	0–1		0–4	1–1	1–2	0–4	3–0	0–2	1–3
Metalurh-2 Zaporizhzhia	1–2	1–2	2–0		2–1 (Note: postponed)	0–4	1–1	2–2	2–2	1–5
Nyva Buzova	3–0	0–1	3–0	4–1		2–0	2–0	5–0	3–2	1–1
Nyva Vinnytsia	3–3	1–1	1–0	2–0	0–0		0–0	4–0	2–0	3–2
Real Pharma Odesa	0–3	2–1	2–0	2–1	0–4	2–3		+:-	2–0	1–0
Rubikon Kyiv	-:+	3–1	-:+	0–3	-:+	-:+	0–7		-:+	0–3
Vast Mykolaiv	1–2	1–2	5–0	2–0	0–1	0–3	0–1	5–1		0–0
Zviahel	2–2	1–1	4–0	3–2	0–1	1–0	1–0 (Note: postponed)	+:-	2–0	

Source: pfl.ua (in Ukrainian)
Legend: Blue = home team win; Yellow = draw; Red = away team win.
Notes:

=== Top goalscorers ===
As of 28 May 2023

Rank	Scorer	Team	Goals (Pen.)
1	(Ukraine) Artur Zahorulko	Nyva Vinnytsia	14 (5)
2	(Ukraine) Oleksiy Lytovchenko	Chaika Petropavlivska Borshchahivka	12 (2)
2	(Ukraine) Ivan Somov	Nyva Buzova	12 (2)
4	1 player(s)		10
5	3 player(s)		8
8	1 player(s)		6
9	4 players		5
13	6 players		4
19	16 players		3
36	15 players		2
51	37 players		1

=== Number of teams by region ===
Number	Region	Team(s)
2	Kyiv Oblast	Chaika Petropavlivska Borshchahivka and Nyva Buzova
1	Kyiv	Rubikon Kyiv
1	Mykolaiv Oblast	Vast Mykolaiv
1	Odesa Oblast	Real Pharma Odesa
1	Poltava Oblast	Kremin-2 Kremenchuk
1	Vinnytsia Oblast	Nyva Vinnytsia
1	Zhytomyr Oblast	Zviahel
1	Zakarpattia Oblast	Khust
1	Zaporizhia Oblast	Metalurh-2 Zaporizhzhia

== Post-season play-offs ==
Following the league season (double round-robin tournament), the runner-up is expected to meet with the 2022–23 First League's 15th placed team to contest the 2022–23 Second League promotion.

== Awards ==
=== Round awards ===
Round	Player			Coach		
Round	Player	Club	Reference	Coach	Club	Reference
Round 1	(Ukraine) Dmytro Yarchuk	Vast Mykolaiv		(Ukraine) Serhiy Karpenko	Nyva Buzova	
Round 2	(Ukraine) Denys Ndukve	Chaika Petropavlivska Borshchahivka		(Ukraine) Volodymyr Tsytkin	Khust	
Round 3	(Ukraine) Valeriy Nikitchuk	Zviahel		(Ukraine) Viktor Kuryata	Rubikon Kyiv	
Round 4	(Ukraine) Oleksiy Lytovchenko	Chaika Petropavlivska Borshchahivka		(Ukraine) Oleh Ostapenko	Nyva Vinnytsia	
Round 5	(Ukraine) Ivan Somov	Nyva Buzova		(Ukraine) Yuriy Kulish	Real Pharma Odesa	
Round 6	(Ukraine) Andriy Fesenko	Zviahel		(Ukraine) Serhiy Karpenko	Nyva Buzova	
Round 7	(Ukraine) Vasyl Lutsiv	Khust		(Ukraine) Volodymyr Tsytkin	Khust	
Round 8	(Ukraine) Serhiy Barsukov	Real Pharma Odesa		(Ukraine) Denys Khomutov	Chaika Petropavlivska Borshchahivka	
Round 9	(Ukraine) Anatoliy Taran	Nyva Buzova		(Ukraine) Serhiy Karpenko	Nyva Buzova	
Round 10	(Ukraine) Andriy Holovatenko	Nyva Buzova		(Ukraine) Serhiy Karpenko	Nyva Buzova	
Round 11	(Ukraine) Oleksiy Shvets	Nyva Vinnytsia		(Ukraine) Serhiy Karpenko	Nyva Buzova	
Round 12	(Ukraine) Artur Zahorulko	Nyva Vinnytsia		(Ukraine) Serhiy Syzykhin	Chaika Petropavlivska Borshchahivka	
Round 13	(Ukraine) Vasyl Lutsiv	Khust		(Ukraine) Ruslan Skydan	Zviahel	
Round 14	(Ukraine) Oleksandr Vivdych	Kremin-2 Kremenchuk		(Ukraine) Ruslan Skydan	Zviahel	
Round 15	(Ukraine) Vladyslav Borysenko	Khust		(Ukraine) Volodymyr Tsytkin	Khust	
Round 16	(Ukraine) Yevhen Mykolayuk	Nyva Buzova		(Ukraine) Serhiy Syzykhin	Chaika Petropavlivska Borshchahivka	
Round 17	(Ukraine) Artur Zahorulko	Nyva Vinnytsia		(Ukraine) Andriy Parkhomenko	Real Pharma Odesa	
Round 18	(Ukraine) Bohdan Pavlych	Khust		(Ukraine) Volodymyr Tsytkin	Khust	

== See also ==
- 2022–23 Ukrainian Premier League
- 2022–23 Ukrainian First League
- 2022–23 Ukrainian Football Amateur League
- List of Ukrainian football transfers summer 2022
