= Stanislav Oksenenko =

Ukrainian footballer

Personal information
- Full name: Stanislav Bohdanovych Oksenenko
- Date of birth: 25 April 2006 (age 20)
- Place of birth: Kherson, Ukraine
- Height: 1.87 m (6 ft 2 in)
- Position: Goalkeeper

Team information
- Current team: Kremin Kremenchuk
- Number: 40

Youth career
- 2012-2022: Kremin Kremenchuk

Senior career*
| Years | Team | Apps | (Gls) |
| 2022– | Kremin Kremenchuk | 10 | (0) |
| 2022– | → Kremin-2 Kremenchuk | 27 | (0) |
- * Club domestic league appearances and goals as of 23 October 2024

Stanislav Bohdanovych Oksenenko (Ukrainian: Станіслав Богданович Оксененко; born 25 April 2006) is a Ukrainian professional footballer who plays as a goalkeeper for Ukrainian club Kremin Kremenchuk and its junior team Kremin-2 Kremenchuk.

Stanyslav began training with Kremin-2006 when he was six years old. His first coach was Oleksandr Zozulya, current assistant of Kremin-2 Kremenchuk.

He began playing for Kremin-2 Kremenchuk at the start of 2022–23 Ukrainian Second League season and featured in 7 matches before the winter break. Oksenenko made his debut for Kremin-2 on 5 September 2022 replacing Ivan Muzychka on 90th minute against Vast. He was selected for team of the week for week 6. During the draw against Chaika he made ten saves and faced close to 40 shots on goal and conceded a late goal. During winter break he was invited to join Kryvbas Kryvyi Rih training camp in Turkey. He did not play in any of the nine friendlies. He made his debut for Kremins main team playing full 90 minutes, on 7 May in a 1:1 draw against Karpaty. He made seven saves. On 86th minute Rostyslav Taranukha scored from a header at close range.
