= Serhii Karpov =

Ukrainian footballer (born 1982)

Personal information
- Full name: Serhii Ivanovych Karpov
- Date of birth: 1 May 1982 (age 44)
- Place of birth: Oleksandriia, Ukrainian SSR
- Height: 1.86 m (6 ft 1 in)
- Position: Goalkeeper

Team information
- Current team: Kudrivka (coach)

Youth career
- 1989-2000: Krystal Oleksandriia

Senior career*
Years	Team	Apps	(Gls)
2001–2003	Polihraftekhnika Oleksandriya	0	(0)
2004–2005	Oleksandriya	36	(0)
2006	Junsele		(0)
2007	Zirka Kirovohrad	0	(0)
2007–2008	Olimpik Kirovohrad	32	(0)
2008	Arsenal Kharkiv	13	(0)
2009	Enerhetyk Burshtyn	0	(0)
2010–2011	Mykolaiv	24	(0)
2011–2012	Enerhetyk Burshtyn	24	(0)
2013	Pervomaisk	0	(0)
2014–2015	Burevisnyk Petrove	27	(0)
2015–2016	Shliakhovyk Oleksandriya	8	(0)
2018	UkrAhroKom Holovkivka	0	(0)
2019	Shlyakhovyk Oleksandriya	9	(0)
2020	Novoukrainka	11	(1)
2021	Inhul-Ahro-Lend	14	(0)
2020–2021	Lider Dolynska (futsal)	5	(0)

Managerial career
- 2014–2021: FC Oleksandriya (U-21)
- 2021–2023: FC Oleksandriya (academy)
- 2023: Nyva Ternopil (goalkeeping coach)
- 2023: Kremin Kremenchuk (goalkeeping coach)
- 2023–2024: FC Kudrivka (goalkeeping coach)
- 2024–: Kudrivka-Nyva (goalkeeping coach)
- * Club domestic league appearances and goals

Serhii Karpov (Ukrainian: Сергій Іванович Карпов; born 1 May 1982) is a Ukrainian retired professional footballer who played as a goalkeeper and current goalkeeping coach for Kudrivka.

== Early life ==
Serhii Karpov was born on 1 May 1982 in Oleksandriia, Ukraine. He began playing football at the age of seven with Krystal Oleksandriya. His first coaches Anatolii Akulich and Yevhenii Abramovich identified him as a goalkeeper. He continued training with Krystal until 2000.

== Club career ==
Karpov signed his first professional contract with Polihraftekhnika Oleksandriya in 2001.

=== Oleksandriia ===
In 2004 Karpov joined MFC Oleksandriia. He made his debut during a 3:3 draw against Vorskla-2 Poltava on 31 July 2004. During the 2004–05 Ukrainian Second League season he made twenty-seven appearances according to Lander. He also featured in one cup game. Next season he also featured in one cup game. During league season he played in nine matches.

=== Junsele ===
In 2006 Karpov joined Swedish club Junsele who played in Division 3.

=== Zirka ===
In 2007 Karpov returned to play in Ukraine. He joined Zirka Kirovohrad.

=== Olimpik ===
2007–08 Ukrainian Second League season Karpov began with Olimpik Kirovohrad. His debut came in a 1:0 loss to Illichivets-2 Mariupol on 25 July 2007. He played in thirty-two league games.

=== Arsenal ===
Karpov became Arsenal Kharkiv player in 2008. He made his debut in a 1:0 win against Stal Dniprodzerzhynsk on 2 August. He featured in thirteen matches and one cup game.

=== Enerhetyk ===
Karpov joined Enerhetyk in 2009. His debut came in a 0:0 draw with Volyn Lutsk on 30 March. During the 2008–09 Ukrainian First League season he played in twelve games. During 2009–10 Ukrainian Second League season he made four appearances.

=== Mykolaiv ===
Karpov joined Mykolaiv in the winter transfer window of 2010. His debut came on eightieth minute during a 5:0 loss to Veres Rivne on 3 April 2010. He made six appearances during 2009–10 Ukrainian Second League season. Next season he featured in seventeen games and one cup game. He became group champions and won promotion to the First League. Karpov was selected as the Mykolaiv Oblast Player of the Year for 2010. He played in 2011–12 Ukrainian First League only one match. That game was a 2:1 loss to Zirka Kropyvnytskyi on 23 July. He left Mykolaiv after the 12 August match against Dynamo-2 Kyiv.

=== Return to Enerhetyk ===
Karpov rejoined Enerhetyk in August 2011 and made his debut on 26 August in a 3:0 loss to Tytan Armiansk. He wore jersey number thirty-two. He made twenty-four league appearances in 2011–12 Ukrainian First League and featured once in a cup.

=== Pervomaisk ===
For the 2013 season Karpov played for Pervomaisk in Pervomaisk. He played in Mykolaiv Oblast championship and 2013 Ukrainian Amateur Cup. Pervomaisk long-time manager Mykola Flakei in 2021 listed Karpov as one of the best goalkeepers for the team.

=== Burevisnyk ===
Karpov joined amateur club Burevisnyk from Petrove which was playing in Kirovohrad Oblast championship in April 2014. During 2015 season his club won the Kirovohrad Oblast Cup.

=== Shliakhovyk ===
In 2016 Karpov joined Shliakhovyk Oleksandriia. There he played for two years in Kirovohrad Oblast Championship.

=== UkrAhroKom ===
In 2018 when amateur club UkrAhroKom was recreated, Karpov joined the club. He played in Kirovohrad Oblast Championship and next year he featured in Ukrainian Amateur Cup.

=== Shliakhovyk ===
Karpov rejoined Shliakhovyk in 2019. He won the Kirovohrad Oblast Cup that year. Karpov was also playing coach for the team.

=== Inhul-Ahro-Lend ===
During 2021 He joined another amateur club Inhul-Ahro-Lend from Berezivka.

=== Charity tournaments ===
On 24 December 2021 a futsal tournament involving twelve teams took place. Karpov played for a team called СК27. On 15 May 2022 Karpov took part in a charity match to support Ukrainian Armed Forces. He played for Shliakhovyk and was the best goalkeeper of the tournament. In August 2022 another charity futsal tournament named "Cup of glory of the Armed Forces of Ukraine" took place in Pervozvanivka, near Kropyvnytskyi. Karpov played for team named "Veteran" and was chosen as best goalkeeper of the tournament.

== Coaching career ==
=== Oleksandriia ===
Karpov began working as a goalkeeping coach for the Oleksandriia U-21 team in 2014. During 2015–16 Ukrainian Premier League Reserves and Under 19 season, Oleksandriia reserves team took part in the competition for the first time. Karpov was the goalkeeping coach. In August 2021 when Oleksandriia academy was created, he became one of six coaches to train over 200 young players born between 2006 and 2015.

=== Nyva ===
On 2 March 2023 Nyva Ternopil announced signing of Karpov as a goalkeeping coach.

=== Kremin ===
Karpov joined the club on 17 July 2023 as a goalkeeping coach. He signed a one-year contract with the club. When Ihor Klymovskyi joined Kremin as a manager and replaced Roman Loktionov, Karpov remained a goalkeeping coach. On 27 November 2023 Kremin announced that Karpov and the club agreed on mutual contract termination.

=== Kudrivka ===
Karpov followed Roman Loktionov to Kudrivka on 27 November 2023.

== Career statistics ==
Appearances and goals by club, season and competition
Club	Season	League			Cup		Other		Total	
Club	Season	Division	Apps	Goals	Apps	Goals	Apps	Goals	Apps	Goals
Polihraftekhnika	2001–02	Vyshcha Liha	0	0	—		—		0	0
Polihraftekhnika	2002–03	Vyshcha Liha	0	0	—		—		0	0
Polihraftekhnika	Total		0	0	0	0	—		0	0
MFC Oleksandriia	2004–05	Second League	27	0	1	0	—		28	0
MFC Oleksandriia	2005–06	Second League	9	0	1	0	—		10	0
MFC Oleksandriia	Total		36	0	2	0	—		38	0
Junsele	2006	Swedish Division 3	—		—		—		—	
Zirka Kirovohrad	2007	Amateur Championship	0	0	—		—		0	0
Olimpik Kirovohrad	2007–08	Second League	32	0	—		—		32	0
Arsenal Kharkiv	2008–09	Second League	13	0	1	0	—		14	0
Enerhetyk Burshtyn	2008–09	First League	12	0	—		—		12	0
Enerhetyk Burshtyn	2009–10	First League	4	0	0	0	—		4	0
Enerhetyk Burshtyn	Total		16	0	0	0	—		16	0
Mykolaiv	2009–10	Second League	6	0	—		—		6	0
Mykolaiv	2010–11	Second League	17	0	1	0	—		18	0
Mykolaiv	2011–12	First League	1	0	—		—		1	0
Mykolaiv	Total		24	0	1	0	—		25	0
Enerhetyk Burshtyn	2011–12	First League	24	0	1	0	—		25	0
Enerhetyk Burshtyn	Enerhetyk total		40	0	1	0	—		41	0
Pervomaisk	2013	Amateur Cup	—		—		4	0	4	0
Burevisnyk Petrove	2014	Amateur Championship	10	0	—		—		10	0
Burevisnyk Petrove	2014	Kirovohrad Oblast Championship	10	0	—		—		10	0
Burevisnyk Petrove	2015	Kirovohrad Oblast Championship	7	0	—		— (Note: Appearances in Kirovohrad Oblast Cup are unknown, at least 1 appearance in final)		7	0
Burevisnyk Petrove	Total		27	0	—		—		27	0
Shliakhovyk Oleksandriia	2016	Kirovohrad Oblast Championship	4	0	—		2 (Note: Appearances in Kirovohrad Oblast Cup)	0	10	0
Shliakhovyk Oleksandriia	2017	Kirovohrad Oblast Championship	4	0	—		—		4	0
Shliakhovyk Oleksandriia	Total		8	0	—		2	0	10	0
UkrAhroKom Holovkivka	2018	Kirovohrad Oblast Championship	14	0	—		—		14	0
UkrAhroKom Holovkivka	2018-19	Amateur Cup	—		—		3	0	3	0
UkrAhroKom Holovkivka	Total		14	0	—		3	0	17	0
Shliakhovyk Oleksandriia	2019	Kirovohrad Oblast Championship	9	0	—		—		9	0
Shliakhovyk Oleksandriia	Enerhetyk total		17	0	—		2	0	19	0
Novoukrainka	2020	Kirovohrad Oblast Championship	11	1	—		—		11	1
Inhul-Ahro-Lend	2021	Kirovohrad Oblast Championship	14	0	—		—		14	1
Career total			228	1	5	0	11	0	244	1

== Honours ==
Mykolaiv

- Ukrainian Second League: 2010–11

Burevisnyk

- Kirovohrad Oblast Cup: 2015

Shliakhovyk

- Kirovohrad Oblast Cup: 2019

Individual

- Mykolaiv Oblast Player of the Year: 2010

== Sources ==
- Lander, Yurii (2005), Футбол в Украине 2004-2005 статистический ежигодник выпуск 14 [Football in Ukraine 2004-2005 statistical yearbook issue 14] (in Russian)
- Lander, Yurii (2006), Футбол в Украине 2005-2006 статистический ежигодник выпуск 15 [Football in Ukraine 2005-2006 statistical yearbook issue 15] (in Russian)
- Lander, Yurii (2008), Футбол в Украине 2007-2008 статистический ежигодник выпуск 17 [Football in Ukraine 2007-2008 statistical yearbook issue 17] (in Russian)
- Lander, Yurii (2009), Футбол в Украине 2008-2009 статистический ежигодник выпуск 18 [Football in Ukraine 2008-2009 statistical yearbook issue 18] (in Russian)
- Lander, Yurii (2010), Футбол в Украине 2009-2010 статистический ежигодник выпуск 19 [Football in Ukraine 2009-2010 statistical yearbook issue 19] (in Russian)
- Lander, Yurii (2011), Футбол в Украине 2010-2011 статистический ежигодник выпуск 20 [Football in Ukraine 2010-2011 statistical yearbook issue 20] (in Russian)
- Lander, Yurii (2012), Футбол в Украине 2011-2012 статистический ежигодник выпуск 21 [Football in Ukraine 2011-2012 statistical yearbook issue 21] (in Russian)
