= Vladyslav Bondar =

Ukrainian footballer (born 2000)

Personal information
- Full name: Vladyslav Mykolayovych Bondar
- Date of birth: 24 March 2000 (age 26)
- Place of birth: Illichivsk, Ukraine
- Height: 1.78 m (5 ft 10 in)
- Position: Midfielder

Team information
- Current team: Kremin Kremenchuk
- Number: 29

Youth career
- 2012–2015: Bastion Illichivsk
- 2015–2019: Mariupol

Senior career*
Years	Team	Apps	(Gls)
2019–2020	Mariupol	1	(0)
2020	Kramatorsk	5	(0)
2021	Podillya Khmelnytskyi	0	(0)
2021	Chornomorsk	?	(?)
2021–2022	Enerhiya Nova Kakhovka	16	(4)
2022–	Kremin Kremenchuk	6	(1)
2022–	→ Kremin-2 Kremenchuk	2	(0)
- * Club domestic league appearances and goals as of 24 April 2023

Vladyslav Mykolayovych Bondar (Ukrainian: Владислав Миколайович Бондар; born 24 March 2000) is a Ukrainian professional football midfielder who plays for Ukrainian club Kremin Kremenchuk and its junior team Kremin-2 Kremenchuk.

== Career ==
Bondar is a product mainly of the Bastion Chornomorsk and Mariupol youth sportive school systems.

=== Mariupol ===
He made his début for FC Mariupol in the Ukrainian Premier League replacing Illya Putrya on 88th minute in a 1:1 draw with defending champion Shakhtar Donetsk on 1 December 2019. He featured in 25 U-19 matches and scored 5 goals. He also played for the U-21 side where he scored 3 goals in 20 matches.

=== Avanhard Kramatorsk ===
During 2020-21 season he joined Ukrainian First League club Avanhard Kramatorsk and took the number 10 shirt. He played 5 matches for the club. Bondar made his debut for Avanhard on 26 September replacing Tymur Pohranichnyi at 70 minutes in a 1:1 draw against Nyva.

=== Podillya ===
On 24 February 2021 Bondar moved to Ukrainian Second League club Podillya Khmelnytskyi. He signed a one-and-a-half-year contract and took the number 77 shirt. On 15 March Bondar was released by Podillya. He did not play in any official matches.

=== Enerhiya ===
Bondar joined Ukrainian Second League club Enerhiya Nova Kakhovka during 2021-22 season and took the number 18 shirt. He made 17 appearances in all competitions for Enerhiya, scoring 5 times. He made his debut for Enerhiya on 25 July 2021 being substituted on the 80th minute in a 4:3 win against Real Pharma. He scored his debut goal for Enerhiya in a 2:1 loss against Krystal on 11 September.

=== Kremin ===
Next season he moved to Ukrainian First League club Kremin Kremenchuk and took the number 29 shirt. Bondar made his debut for Kremin on 23 September 2022 replacing Simon Haloyan at 46 minutes in a 2:0 loss against Poltava. He scored his debut goal for Kremin in a 3:3 draw against Skoruk Tomakivka on 21 October. He also plays in Ukrainian Second League for junior team Kremin-2 Kremenchuk. Bondar made his debut for Kremin-2 on 10 September 2022 playing full 90 minutes in a 3:0 win against Rubikon.
