= Umanets =

Umanets is a surname. Notable people with the surname include:

- Artem Umanets (born 2002), Ukrainian professional footballer
- Nina Umanets (born 1956), Ukrainian rower
- Olena Umanets (born 1990), Ukrainian handball player
- Ruslan Umanets (born 1976), Ukrainian footballer and manager
