= Kramarenko =

Kramarenko (Cyrillic: Крамаре́нко) is a unisex Ukrainian surname that may refer to the following notable people:

- Anton Kramarenko (born 1984), Kyrgyzstani swimmer
- Boris Kramarenko (born 1955), Soviet wrestler
- Dmitriy Kramarenko (born 1974), Azerbaijani football goalkeeper
- Ekaterina Kramarenko (born 1991), Russian artistic gymnast
- Lala Kramarenko (born 2004), Russian rhythmic gymnast
- Oleh Kramarenko (disambiguation), multiple people
- Sergey Kramarenko (disambiguation), multiple people
- Yana Kramarenko (born 2002), Israeli rhythmic gymnast
