= Artem Tovkach =

Ukrainian footballer (born 2002)

Personal information
- Full name: Artem Ihorovych Tovkach
- Date of birth: 30 December 2002 (age 23)
- Place of birth: Kirovohrad, Ukraine
- Height: 1.77 m (5 ft 10 in)
- Position: Right-back

Team information
- Current team: Metalurh Zaporizhzhia
- Number: 30

Youth career
- 2014–2018: Dnipro
- 2018–2019: Inter Dnipro

Senior career*
Years	Team	Apps	(Gls)
2019–2021	Zorya Luhansk	0	(0)
2021–2024	Kremin Kremenchuk	45	(1)
2022–2024	→ Kremin-2 Kremenchuk	6	(0)
2024–	Metalurh Zaporizhzhia	19	(0)
- * Club domestic league appearances and goals as of 27 December 2025

Artem Ihorovych Tovkach (Ukrainian: Артем Ігорович Товкач; born 30 December 2002) is a Ukrainian professional footballer who plays as a right-back for Ukrainian club Metalurh Zaporizhzhia.

== Career ==
Tovkach began playing football at age 7. In Dnipro he attended Specialized secondary school # 141. In May 2014 His school team took part in Ukrainian competition of the Danone Nations Cup. During regional finals of the competition his team won 5:0 against secondary school # 55 from Donetsk and won 1:0 secondary school # 6 from Kupiansk on 20 May. During the Ukrainian final held in Arena Lviv on 28 May they won 2:0 against a team from Sumy. Tovkach played in the final part of the competition held of 14 to 16 November at Arena Corinthians in Sao Paulo, Brazil. His team finished twenty-fifth.

=== Kremin ===
On 18 July 2021, Tovkach moved to Ukrainian First League club Kremin Kremenchuk and took the number 35 shirt. He made his debut for Kremin on 14 August replacing Viktor Pylypenko at 86 minutes in a 4:1 loss against Kryvbas. While preparing for the spring part of 2021–22 Ukrainian First League Kremin played in "Poltava Spring 2022" regional competition. During the 23 February 2022 match he received a fracture of the fifth metatarsal bone of the left foot sidelining him for at least a month and a half. He scored his debut goal for Kremin in a 7:0 win against Hirnyk-Sport on 18 September. Tovkach made his debut for Kremin-2 on 22 September being substituted on the 46th minute in a 1:0 loss against Khust.
