= Viktor Pylypenko =

Viktor Pylypenko may refer to:

- Viktor Pylypenko (soldier) (born 1986), Ukrainian soldier and LGBTQ+ rights activist
- Viktor Pylypenko (footballer) (born 2000), Ukrainian footballer
