= Oleksii Zhdanovych =

Ukrainian footballer (born 2003)

Personal information
- Full name: Oleksii Serhiiovych Zhdanovych
- Date of birth: 27 September 2003 (age 23)
- Place of birth: Kirovohrad, Ukraine
- Height: 1.83 m (6 ft 0 in)
- Position: Midfielder

Team information
- Current team: UCSA Tarasivka
- Number: 28

Youth career
- 2016–2017: Olimpik Kropyvnytskyi
- 2018–2019: Zirka Kropyvnytsky

Senior career*
Years	Team	Apps	(Gls)
2017–2018	Olimpik Kropyvnytskyi	12	(1)
2018–2021	Zirka Kropyvnytsky	36	(4)
2022–2025	Kremin Kremenchuk	38	(2)
2022–2023	→ Kremin-2 Kremenchuk	17	(1)
2025–	UCSA Tarasivka	21	(1)
- * Club domestic league appearances and goals as of 4 June 2026

Oleksii Serhiiovych Zhdanovych (Ukrainian: Олексій Сергійович Жданович; born 27 September 2003) is a Ukrainian professional footballer who plays as a midfielder for Ukrainian club UCSA Tarasivka.

== Career ==
=== Kremin ===
On 18 February 2022 he moved to Ukrainian First League club Kremin Kremenchuk. Zhdanovych signed a two-and-a-half-year contract and took number 17 shirt. He made his debut for Kremin on 2 September replacing Orest Panchyshyn at 46 minutes in a 3:1 win against Skoruk Tomakivka. He made his debut for Kremin-2 on 5 September playing full 90 minutes in a 5:0 loss against Vast Mykolaiv. Zhdanovych scored his debut goal for Kremin in a 2:1 loss against Nyva Vinnytsia on 13 May. In summer 2025 he moved to UCSA.
