= Ruslan Umanets =

Ukrainian footballer (born 1976)

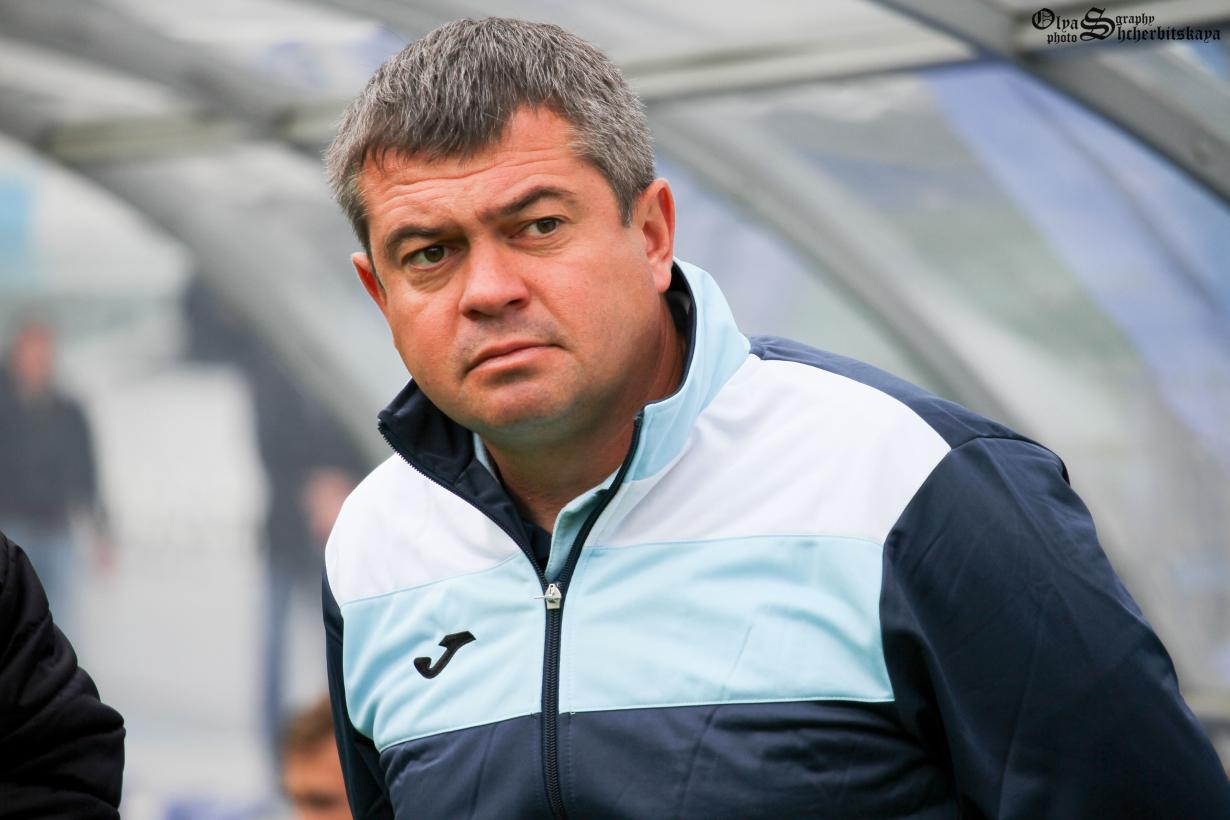
- Umanets in 2016

Personal information
- Full name: Ruslan Hennadiovych Umanets
- Date of birth: 2 July 1976 (age 50)
- Place of birth: Donetsk, Ukrainian SSR, Soviet Union
- Position: Defender

Team information
- Current team: Nyva Ternopil (assistant coach)

Youth career
- Shakhtar Donetsk academy

Senior career*
Years	Team	Apps	(Gls)
1993	Kholodna Balka Makiivka	5	(0)
1993–1994	Bazhanovets Makiivka	34	(1)
1994	Khartsyzk	2	(0)
1995	Hirnyk Makiivka	2	(0)
1995	Shakhtar-2 Donetsk	17	(0)
1998–2000	Ukrsplav Donetsk (futsal)	55	(17)

Managerial career
- 2022: Tytan Kyiv
- 2023: Lokomotyv Kyiv
- * Club domestic league appearances and goals

Ruslan Umanets (Ukrainian: Руслан Геннадійович Уманець; born 2 July 1976) is a Ukrainian professional football manager and former player who played as a defender. He most recently coached Ukrainian club Lokomotyv Kyiv and is current assistant coach of a First League club Nyva Ternopil.

== Playing career ==
Ruslan Umanets was born on 2 July 1976, in Donetsk, Ukrainian SSR, Soviet Union. He began his football education with Shakhtar Donetsk academy. His first club in 1993 was Kholodna Balka Makiivka. He quickly moved to Bazhanovets Makiivka where he made a total of thirsty-six appearances scoring one goal. Umanets had two very short stints with Khartsyzk and Hirnyk Makiivka. In 1995 he began playing for Shakhtar-2 Donetsk where he featured seventeen times. From 1998 to 2000 he played futsal for Ukrsplav Donetsk featuring in fifty-five games and scoring seventeen goals.

== Coaching career ==
After his playing career ended, Umanets began coaching children at Metalurh Donetsk. In 2001 he joined Olimpik Donetsk as children's coach and remained with the club until 2014. In 2005–06 season his team finished second in the U-15 championship. In August 2014 he tool his best players born in 2000 and joined Torpedo Mykolaiv. On 1 July 2016 he was appointed as an Olimpik U-19 coach. On 25 February 2021 Olimpic manager Ihor Klymovskyi was fired from his post, Umanets also left his position. He followed Klymovskyi to Nyva Ternopil on 13 April 2021 as his assistant. He joined Rubikon Kyiv as coach in August 2022. In late 2022 he became a manager for amateur club Tytan Kyiv. In summer of 2023 Umanets signed a one-year-long contract with Lokomotyv Kyiv. He was fired on 25 September 2023 after gaining only four points in nine games. Two days later on 27 September he joined Ukrainian First League club Kremin Kremenchuk as an assistant to Klymovskyi. Umantes was an assistant in nineteen matches. On 20 June 2024 he joined Nyva Ternopil as an assistant coach.

== Personal life ==
He is father to Artem Umanets.

== Legacy ==
During his career Hryhorii trained the following Ukrainian Premier league players: Zauri Makharadze, Dmytro Hrechyshkin, Vladyslav Kulach, Ihor Levchenko and Dmytro Oliynyk.
