= Arsenii Korkodym =

Ukrainian footballer (born 2002)

Personal information
- Full name: Arsenii Yuriiovych Korkodym
- Date of birth: 3 October 2002 (age 24)
- Place of birth: Kyiv, Ukraine
- Height: 1.95 m (6 ft 5 in)
- Position: Goalkeeper

Team information
- Current team: Veres Rivne
- Number: 78

Youth career
- 2015–2018: Chaika Vyshhorod
- 2018–2019: Volyn Lutsk

Senior career*
Years	Team	Apps	(Gls)
2019–2022	Volyn Lutsk	1	(0)
2020–2021	→ Volyn-2 Lutsk	23	(0)
2022–2024	Veres Rivne	0	(0)
2024	→ Kremin Kremenchuk (loan)	10	(0)

International career
2023	Ukraine (students)	1	(0)
- * Club domestic league appearances and goals as of 16:50, 13 June 2024 (UTC)

Arsenii Korkodym (Ukrainian: Арсеній Юрійович Коркодим; born 3 October 2002) is a Ukrainian professional footballer who plays as a goalkeeper for Ukrainian club Veres Rivne.

== Early life ==
Arsenii Korkodym was born on 3 October 2002, in Kyiv, Ukraine. As a child, he played for Chaika in Vyshhorod. In 2018 he moved to Volyn Lutsk academy.

== Club career ==
=== Volyn Lutsk ===
Korkodym made his debut for Volyn U19 side in a 5:0 win against Dnipro-1 U19 on 22 November 2019 in the 2019–20 Ukrainian Premier League Under-21 and Under-19. In the 2021–22 season Korkodym made his debut in the first league in a 1:0 loss to Ahrobiznes Volochysk on 29 October 2021. He also featured in three cup matches.

=== Volyn-2 Lutsk ===
Korkodym played in twenty-three matches in the 2020–21 Ukrainian Second League for Volyn second team.

=== Veres Rivne ===
Korkodym joined Ukrainian Premier League club Veres Rivne in July 2022. He signed a three-year contract and took the number 78 shirt. In his first season with the club, Korkodym was an unused substitute in all thirty league matches and two play-off games. During 2023 he only featured in one friendly match against Levadia Tallinn in BGV Winter Cup for Veres. His second season was also spent as an unused substitute in fourteen league and two cup games. In January 2024 Korkodym was part of the team as they went to Turkey for a training camp. He took part in three friendly matches there.

=== Kremin ===
Kremin manager Ihor Klymovskyi wanted to bring Korkodym on trial after watching him play on video. After three training sessions Korkodym signed on loan until end of season. He kept the number 78 shirt he wore in Veres. On 12 June 2024 Korkodym returned to Veres Rivne after having made ten appearances for Kremin.

== International career ==
In October 2022 Korkodym was called up to Ukraine national student football team where he played full ninety minutes in a 2:1 win against South Korea. He was unused substitute for the rest of tournament. As Ukraine lost in the final Korkodym received a silver medal for his participation.

== Career statistics ==
As of 28 February 2024

Appearances and goals by club, season and competition
Club	Season	League			Cup		Other		Total	
Club	Season	Division	Apps	Goals	Apps	Goals	Apps	Goals	Apps	Goals
Volyn U19 Lutsk	2019–20	Ukrainian Premier League Under-19	—		—		—		—	
Volyn-2 Lutsk	2020–21	Second League	23	0	—		—		23	0
Volyn Lutsk	2021–22	First League	1	0	3	0	—		4	0
Veres Rivne	2022–23	Ukrainian Premier League	0	0	0	0	—		0	0
Veres Rivne	2023–24	Ukrainian Premier League	0	0	—		—		0	0
Veres Rivne	Total		0	0	0	0	—		0	0
Kremin	2023–24	First League	10	0	—		—		10	0
Career total			34	0	3	0	—		37	0
