= Yurii Dudnyk (footballer, born 2002) =

Ukrainian footballer (born 2002)

Personal information
- Full name: Yurii Vitaliiovych Dudnyk
- Date of birth: 12 September 2002 (age 24)
- Place of birth: Luhansk, Ukraine
- Height: 1.91 m (6 ft 3 in)
- Position: Defender

Team information
- Current team: Viktoriya Sumy
- Number: 4

Youth career
- 2015–2016: Kremin Kremenchuk
- 2016–2017: Metalurh Zaporizhzhia
- 2017–2018: Goalkeeper Zaporizhzhia
- 2018–2019: Kremin Kremenchuk

Senior career*
| Years | Team | Apps | (Gls) |
| 2019–2022 | Zorya Luhansk | 1 | (0) |
| 2022 | Baník Sokolov | 12 | (0) |
| 2023–2024 | Kremin Kremenchuk | 24 | (0) |
| 2023–2024 | Kremin-2 Kremenchuk | 4 | (0) |
| 2024 | Bukovyna Chernivtsi | 6 | (1) |
| 2025– | Viktoriya Sumy | 17 | (0) |
- * Club domestic league appearances and goals as of 4 June 2026

Yurii Vitaliiovych Dudnyk (Ukrainian: Юрій Віталійович Дудник; born 12 September 2002) is a Ukrainian professional footballer who plays as a defender for Ukrainian club Viktoriya Sumy.

== Career ==
Dudnyk is a product of the Kremin Kremenchuk and Metalurh Zaporizhzhia youth sportive school systems.

In August 2019 he was signed by Zorya Luhansk and he made his debut for this club in the Ukrainian Premier League as a second half-time substituted player in the winning home match against FC Oleksandriya on 9 May 2021. While playing for Zorya in Ukrainian Premier League Under-21 and Under-19 he featured in 60 matches and scored 2 goals.He signed with Kremin in February 2022 for a year and a half contract.

Dudnyk moved to Czech Republic to a Bohemian Football League club Baník Sokolov in 2022. He played 12 matches at the club. During round 11 match against Králův Dvůr on he received a red card. By 15 March 2023 he already left Baník Sokolov.

=== Kremin ===
Dudnyk moved to Ukrainian First League club Kremin Kremenchuk during the winter break. He was revealed on 23 March 2023 and took number 41 shirt and signed a two-year contract. After a year and a half with the club he played in twenty-four matches and four matches for Kremin-2 Kremenchuk. On 19 June 2024 he left Kremin.

=== Bukovyna ===
Dudnyk joined Ukrainian First League club Bukovyna Chernivtsi in June 2024.

== Personal life ==
Dudnyk is the nephew of Ukrainian former professional footballer also called Yuriy Dudnyk.
