= Artem Piatybrat =

Ukrainian footballer (born 2004)

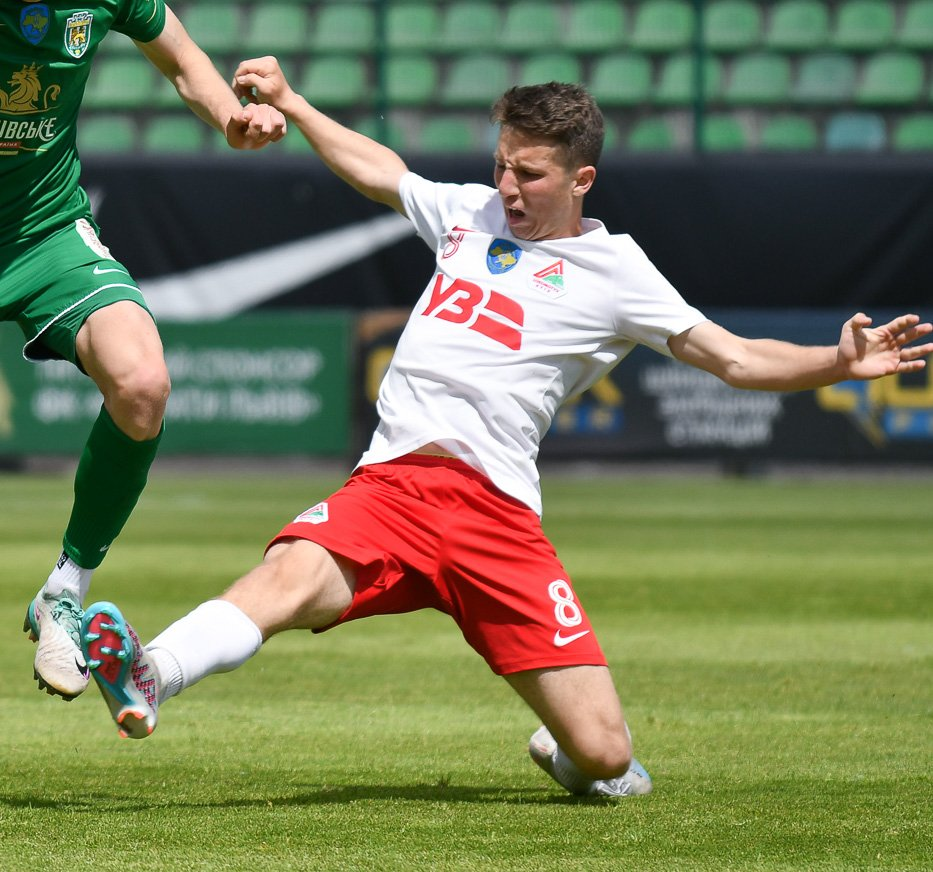

Personal information
- Full name: Artem Romanovych Piatybrat
- Date of birth: 16 September 2004 (age 22)
- Place of birth: Kremenchuk, Ukraine
- Height: 1.69 m (5 ft 7 in)
- Position: Midfielder

Team information
- Current team: Lokomotyv Kyiv
- Number: 8

Youth career
- 2017-2021: Kremin Kremenchuk

Senior career*
Years	Team	Apps	(Gls)
2022–2024	Kremin Kremenchuk	12	(0)
2021–2023	→ Kremin-2 Kremenchuk	52	(8)
2024–	Lokomotyv Kyiv	19	(0)
- * Club domestic league appearances and goals as of 31 December 2024

Artem Piatybrat (Ukrainian: Артем Романович П'ятибрат; born 16 September 2004) is a Ukrainian professional footballer who plays as a midfielder for Ukrainian club Lokomotyv Kyiv.

== Career ==
Piatybrat made his debut for Kremin-2 Kremenchuk on 3 May 2021 in a Poltava Oblast Cup match against Druzhba Ocheretuvate. He was the team captain. He scored 6 goals for Kremin-2 in the Poltava Oblast League and Cup. In February 2022 he also signed a two-year contract for Kremin. He took the number 15 shirt. On August 9 he played for Kremin-2 Kremenchuk in the first game since the start of Russian invasion of Ukraine and scored his debut goal for the club. He scored his second goal against Zviahel. Piatybrat made his debut for Kremin on 2 September 2022 as a 76th-minute substitute in a 3:1 win against Skoruk Tomakivka.
