= Artem Umanets =

Ukrainian footballer (born 2002)

Personal information
- Full name: Artem Ruslanovych Umanets
- Date of birth: 3 May 2002 (age 24)
- Place of birth: Donetsk, Ukraine
- Height: 1.69 m (5 ft 7 in)
- Position: Right winger

Team information
- Current team: Vorskla Poltava
- Number: 8

Youth career
- 2014–2015: Torpedo Mykolaiv
- 2015–2019: Shakhtar Donetsk

Senior career*
Years	Team	Apps	(Gls)
2019–	Vorskla Poltava	0	(0)
2021–2023	→ Rubikon Kyiv (loan)	24	(1)
2023	→ Lokomotyv Kyiv (loan)	12	(2)
2024	→ Kremin Kremenchuk (loan)	7	(0)
2024	→ Kremin-2 Kremenchuk (loan)	3	(0)
- * Club domestic league appearances and goals as of 16:57, 13 June 2024 (UTC)

Artem Ruslanovych Umanets (Ukrainian: Артем Русланович Уманець; born 3 May 2002) is a Ukrainian professional footballer who plays as a right winger for Vorskla Poltava.

On 12 June 2024 Umanets returned to Vorskla Poltava. after having made seven appearances for Kremin and three for Kremin-2.

== Personal life ==
He is son to coach Ruslan Umanets.
