= Oleksandr Vivdych =

Ukrainian footballer (born 2003)

Personal information
- Full name: Oleksandr Valentynovych Vivdych
- Date of birth: 22 February 2003 (age 23)
- Place of birth: Zhytomyr, Ukraine
- Height: 1.78 m (5 ft 10 in)
- Position: Forward

Team information
- Current team: Poltava
- Number: 88

Youth career
- 2016-2017: DYuFK Zherm Cherniakhiv
- 2017: Premier-Nyva Vinnytsia
- 2018-2019: Polissya Zhytomyr
- 2019: FC Shakhtar Donetsk junior squads and academy

Senior career*
Years	Team	Apps	(Gls)
2020	SDYuSShOR Polissya Zhytomyr	1	(0)
2020-2021	Rukh Lviv	0	(0)
2020-2021	Oleksandriya	0	(0)
2022–2023	Kremin Kremenchuk	26	(4)
2023	→ Kremin-2 Kremenchuk	2	(1)
2023–	Poltava	57	(7)
- * Club domestic league appearances and goals as of 3 June 2026

Oleksandr Valentynovych Vivdych (Ukrainian: Олександр Валентинович Вівдич; born 22 February 2003) is a Ukrainian professional footballer who plays as a forward for Ukrainian club Poltava.

On 24 August 2022, Savitskyi moved to Ukrainian First League club Kremin Kremenchuk. He signed a one-year contract and took the number 88 shirt. He made his debut for Kremin on 27 August replacing Ivan Kuts at 46 minutes in a 3:3 draw against Metalurh. He scored his first 2 goals on 2 September in a 3:1 win against Skoruk Tomakivka. He made his debut for Kremin-2 on 30 April 2023 in a 1:1 draw against Nyva Buzova. He also scored his first goal in that match.
