= Dmytro Ulianko =

Ukrainian footballer (born 2004)

Personal information
- Full name: Dmytro Oleksandrovych Ulianko
- Date of birth: 24 March 2004 (age 22)
- Place of birth: Kremenchuk, Ukraine
- Height: 1.80 m (5 ft 11 in)
- Position: Midfielder

Team information
- Current team: Maramuresh Nyzhnia Apsha
- Number: 20

Youth career
- 2017-2021: Kremin Kremenchuk

Senior career*
Years	Team	Apps	(Gls)
2022–2023	Kremin Kremenchuk	0	(0)
2021–2023	→ Kremin-2 Kremenchuk	37	(2)
2023–	Maramuresh Nyzhnia Apsha	12	(0)
- * Club domestic league appearances and goals as of 14:33, 17 January 2024 (UTC)

Dmytro Ulianko (Ukrainian: Дмитро Олександрович Ульянко; born 24 March 2004) is a Ukrainian professional footballer who last played as a midfielder for Ukrainian club Maramuresh Nyzhnia Apsha.

== Career ==
=== Kremin ===
Ulianko began training with Kremin when he was six years old. He made his debut for Kremin-2 Kremenchuk on 3 May 2021 in a Poltava Oblast Cup match against Druzhba Ocheretuvate. He became Kremin-2's first-ever goalscorer on 41st minute of the match. He scored 5 goals for Kremin-2 in the Poltava Oblast League and Cup and played in 21 matches. In February 2022 he also signed a two-year contract for Kremin. He took the number 15 shirt. After playing for 16 matches in the Second league, Ulianko left Kremin on 9 June 2023.
