= Oleksandr Kalchuk =

Ukrainian footballer (born 2002)

Personal information
- Full name: Oleksandr Ivanovych Kalchuk
- Date of birth: 3 August 2002 (age 24)
- Place of birth: Kyiv, Ukraine
- Height: 1.90 m (6 ft 3 in)
- Position: Defender

Team information
- Current team: SC Chaika Petropavlivska Borshchahivka
- Number: 4

Youth career
- 2011-2015: Dynamo Kyiv junior squads and Academy
- 2015-2021: KDYuSSh-15 Kyiv

Senior career*
Years	Team	Apps	(Gls)
2022–2024	Kremin Kremenchuk	9	(0)
2022–2024	→ Kremin-2 Kremenchuk	6	(0)
2023	→ Hirnyk-Sport Horishni Plavni (loan)	13	(0)
2024–	Chaika Petropavlivska Borshchahivka	6	(1)
- * Club domestic league appearances and goals as of 25 June 2024

Oleksandr Ivanovych Kalchuk (Ukrainian: Олександр Іванович Кальчук; born 3 August 2002) is a Ukrainian professional footballer who plays as a defender for Ukrainian club Chaika Petropavlivska Borshchahivka.

== Career ==
Kalchuk began his football education at the Dynamo Kyiv junior squads and Academy where he played 56 games and scored 23 goals. In 2015 he moved to KDYuSSh-15 Kyiv. He played in Kyiv city championship, Cup and Ukrainian championship featuring in 148 games and scoring 18 goals.

=== Kremin ===
Kalchuk joined Ukrainian First League club Kremin Kremenchuk on 3 September 2022. He signed a two-year contract and took number 46 shirt. Kalchuk made his debut for Kremin on 2 September 2022 playing full 90 minutes in a 3:1 win against Skoruk Tomakivka. His debut for Kremin-2 came on 8 October 2022 when he played for 90 minutes in a 1:1 draw against Chaika Petropavlivska Borshchahivka. In two seasons with the club he made nine appearances.

=== Kremin-2 ===
Kalchuk played for Kremin second team in the Second League, making six appearances.

=== Hirnyk-Sport ===
Kalchuk moved to on loan to Hirnyk-Sport Horishni Plavni on 21 June 2023. In December 2023 his loan ended and he returned to Kremin. He made thirteen league appearances and played in three cup matches.

=== Chaika Petropavlivska Borshchahivka ===
Kalchuk joined Ukrainian Second League club Chaika Petropavlivska Borshchahivka on 19 February 2024.
