= Andrii Kireiev =

Ukrainian footballer (born 2001)

Personal information
- Full name: Andrii Petrovych Kireiev
- Date of birth: 27 September 2001 (age 25)
- Place of birth: Dnipropetrovsk, Ukraine
- Height: 1.84 m (6 ft 0 in)
- Position: Defensive midfielder

Team information
- Current team: UCSA Tarasivka
- Number: 8

Youth career
- 2014–2018: DYuSSh-12 Dnipro
- 2018–2019: Dnipro-1

Senior career*
Years	Team	Apps	(Gls)
2019–2022	Dnipro-1	0	(0)
2021–2022	→ Nikopol (loan)	12	(0)
2022–2024	Kremin Kremenchuk	17	(1)
2023	→ Kremin-2 Kremenchuk	4	(0)
2024–	UCSA Tarasivka	35	(0)
- * Club domestic league appearances and goals as of 4 June 2026

Andrii Petrovych Kireiev (Ukrainian: Андрій Петрович Кіреєв; born 27 September 2001) is a Ukrainian professional footballer who plays as a defensive midfielder for UCSA Tarasivka.

== Early life ==
Andrii Kireiev was born in September 2001, in Dnipro, Ukraine. He was trained in Dnipro football school DYuSSh-12 from 2014 to 2018.

== Club career ==
=== Dnipro-1 ===
Kireiev signed for Ukrainian First League club SC Dnipro-1 in 2018. He played in U19 and U21 teams making fifty-two appearances and scored three goals.

=== Nikopol ===
In 2021 Kireiev joined Ukrainian Second League club Nikopol on loan. He played in twelve league and one cup match.

=== Kremin ===
Kireiev joined Ukrainian First League club Kremin Kremenchuk in April 2023. He wore number 6 shirt. He left Kremin in December 2023. During his time with the club, he played a total of six hundred eighty-seven minutes in seventeen matches. He also scored one goal.

=== Kremin-2 ===
Kireiev was also registered to play for Kremin-2 team, a second team of Kremin Kremenchuk playing in Second League. He featured in four matches.

=== UCSA Tarasivka ===
Kireiev was on trial with UCSA Tarasivka in February and scored in a friendly with Zorya Luhansk U19 team. On 1 March 2024 Kireiev was revealed as a UCSA Tarasivka player. He signed a two-year contract and took the number 8 shirt.
