= Yakiv Barinov =

Ukrainian footballer (born 2003)

Personal information
- Full name: Yakiv Antonovych Barinov
- Date of birth: 14 February 2003 (age 23)
- Place of birth: Kramatorsk, Ukraine
- Height: 1.80 m (5 ft 11 in)
- Position: Midfielder

Team information
- Current team: Kremin Kremenchuk
- Number: 15

Youth career
- 2014–2016: Dynamo Kharkiv
- 2016–2017: Master of the Ball Kharkiv
- 2017–2018: DYuSSh Liubotyn
- 2018–2019: Master of the Ball Kharkiv
- 2019–2021: Kramatorsk

Senior career*
Years	Team	Apps	(Gls)
2022	DYuFSh Vorskla Poltava	8	(3)
2023–	Kremin Kremenchuk	0	(0)
2023–	→ Kremin-2 Kremenchuk	20	(2)
- * Club domestic league appearances and goals as of 1 July 2024

Yakiv Barinov (Ukrainian: Яків Антонович Барінов; born 14 February 2003) is a Ukrainian professional footballer who plays as a midfielder for Ukrainian club Kremin Kremenchuk and its junior team Kremin-2 Kremenchuk.

== Early life ==
Yakiv Barinov was born on 14 February 2003 in Kramatorsk. He began training in Dynamo Kharkiv football school in 2014. After spending two years there he moved to another Kharkiv school Master of the Ball. After a year Barinov joined another school in Lyubotyn. For the 2018–19 year he returned to Master of the Ball school. His next three years were spent in Kramatorsk academy. He wore the number 9 shirt.

== Career ==
=== DYuFSh Vorskla Poltava ===
In 2022 Barinov joined youth team of Vorskla Poltava that played in the 2022 Football Championship of Poltava Oblast. He featured in eight matches and scored three goals.

=== Kremin ===
On 31 August 2023 Barinov became a player for the Ukrainian first league club Kremin Kremenchuk. He signed a three-year contract and took number 15 shirt. He was not selected to be a part of Kremin squad for the first half of the season. After winter break he was added to the main squad while still playing for Kremin-2.

=== Kremin-2 ===
Barinov made his debut for Kremin-2 on 4 September 2023 playing seventy-four minutes in a 7:0 loss against Zviahel. Barinov scored his first goal in the seventy-fourth minute in a 2:1 loss against Metalurh-2 Zaporizhzhia on 24 November 2023. He scored his second on 7 April 2024 in a 4:2 loss to FC Kudrivka. He was named the young player of the week in the twenty-sixth round. He was described by Artur Valerko writing for sportarena an official partner of the league as the best player on the field in first half, and as the most unlucky player of round.

== Career statistics ==
As of 29 April 2024

Appearances and goals by club, season and competition
Club	Season	League			Cup		Other		Total	
Club	Season	Division	Apps	Goals	Apps	Goals	Apps	Goals	Apps	Goals
DYuFSh Vorskla Poltava	2022	Football Championship of Poltava Oblast	8	3	—		—		8	3
Kremin	2023–24	Ukrainian First League	—		—		—		—	
Kremin-2	2023–24	Second League	17	2	—		—		17	2
Career total			25	5	—		—		25	5
