= Oleh Kramarenko =

Oleh Kramarenko may refer to:

- Oleh Kramarenko (sprinter), Ukrainian sprinter
- Oleh Kramarenko (footballer born 1956), Ukrainian Soviet footballer and coach
- Oleh Kramarenko (footballer born 1994), Ukrainian footballer
