= Ivan Muzychka =

Ukrainian footballer (born 2002)

Personal information
- Full name: Ivan Viktorovych Muzychka
- Date of birth: 2 March 2002 (age 24)
- Place of birth: Vinnytsia, Ukraine
- Height: 1.91 m (6 ft 3 in)
- Position: Goalkeeper

Youth career
- 2013–2015: Premier-Nyva Vinnytsia
- 2015–2017: Dnipro
- 2017–2019: Shakhtar Donetsk

Senior career*
Years	Team	Apps	(Gls)
2019–2020	Shakhtar Donetsk	0	(0)
2020–2021	Nyva Vinnytsia	3	(0)
2021	Oleksandriya	0	(0)
2021–2022	Munkach Mukachevo	0	(0)
2022–2023	Kremin Kremenchuk	8	(0)
2022–2023	→ Kremin-2 Kremenchuk	7	(0)
- * Club domestic league appearances and goals as of 21 March 2024

Ivan Viktorovych Muzychka (Ukrainian: Іван Вікторович Музичка; born 2 February 2002) is a Ukrainian professional footballer who plays as a goalkeeper.

== Career ==
In 2019 Muzychka was academy player in Shakhtar Donetsk. During the international break in October, he was training with the main squad. He played in Shakhtar U19 and never featured for the main team.

=== Nyva ===
In the early part of August 2020, he moved to Ukrainian Second League club Nyva Vinnytsia. Muzychka took shirt number 1. He featured in 3 matches. His debut was on 12 September 2020 in a 1:3 loss to FC Obolon-Brovar.

=== Oleksandriya ===
In February 2021 Muzychka joined Ukrainian Premier League club Oleksandriya. He played 4 matches for their U19 and U21 teams.

=== Munkacs ===
Next season he moved to Munkacs Mukachevo. He was an unused substitute in six matches. He made his debut on 4 August 2021 in the First preliminary round of 2021–22 Ukrainian Cup 2:0 loss against amateur Feniks Pidmonastyr.

=== Kremin ===
On 24 August 2022, Muzychka moved to Ukrainian First League club Kremin Kremenchuk. He signed a one-year contract and took the number 1 shirt. He made his debut for Kremin-2 on 5 September being substituted on the 90th minute against Vast. His debut for Kremin was on 7 October in a 0:2 win against Chernihiv.
