= Andrii Savitskyi =

Ukrainian footballer (born 2001)

Personal information
- Full name: Andrii Andriiovych Savitskyi
- Date of birth: 9 December 2001 (age 24)
- Place of birth: Znamianka, Ukraine
- Height: 1.86 m (6 ft 1 in)
- Position: Midfielder

Team information
- Current team: FC Probiy Horodenka
- Number: 8

Youth career
- 2009-2011: Heoid-Mriya Znamianka
- 2011: DYuSh Znamianka
- 2011-2012: DYuSh-Mriya Znamianka
- 2012-2013: Zirka-2001
- 2013-2018: Zirka Kropyvnytskyi

Senior career*
Years	Team	Apps	(Gls)
2017–2019	Zirka Kropyvnytskyi	8	(0)
2019-2020	Oleksandriya	0	(0)
2020-2021	Zirka Kropyvnytskyi	0	(0)
2020-2021	Metalist 1925 Kharkiv	7	(0)
2021	Vovchansk	5	(0)
2022–2025	Kremin Kremenchuk	63	(4)
2025–26	Metalurh Zaporizhzhia	24	(0)
2026-	FC Probiy Horodenka	14	(0)
- * Club domestic league appearances and goals as of 1/11/26 @ 04:25(AEST)

Andrii Andriiovych Savitskyi (Ukrainian: Андрій Андрійович Савіцький; born 9 December 2001) is a Ukrainian professional footballer who plays as a midfielder for Ukrainian club Metalurh Zaporizhzhia.

== Career ==
On 24 August 2022, Savitskyi moved to Ukrainian First League club Kremin Kremenchuk. He signed a one-year contract and took the number 10 shirt. He made his debut for Kremin on 27 August replacing Andriy Hloba at 58 minutes in a 3:3 draw against Metalurh. He scored his first goal on 7 October in a 0:2 win against Chernihiv. Savitskyi signed a new one-year contract in July 2023.
