= Dmytro Kasimov =

Ukrainian footballer (born 1999)

Personal information
- Full name: Dmytro Dmytrovych Kasimov
- Date of birth: 14 August 1999 (age 27)
- Place of birth: Dnipropetrovsk, Ukraine
- Height: 1.78 m (5 ft 10 in)
- Position: Right midfielder

Team information
- Current team: Inhulets Petrove
- Number: 77

Youth career
- 2009–2012: Pioner Kirovohrad
- 2012–2014: Zirka Kirovohrad
- 2014–2016: DYuSSh-2 Kirovohrad

Senior career*
Years	Team	Apps	(Gls)
2016–2019	Zirka Kropyvnytskyi	15	(0)
2019	Yarud Mariupol	4	(1)
2019–2021	Obolon Kyiv	10	(0)
2019–2021	→ Obolon-2 Bucha	27	(3)
2022–2023	Mynai	6	(0)
2023	Kremin Kremenchuk	16	(0)
2023	→ Kremin-2 Kremenchuk	1	(0)
2024–2025	Ahrobiznes Volochysk	26	(3)
2025–26	Inhulets Petrove	33	(3)
2026-	SC Poltava	13	(1)
- * Club domestic league appearances and goals as of 29/10/26 @ 15:45(AEST)

Dmytro Dmytrovych Kasimov (Ukrainian: Дмитро Дмитрович Касімов; born 14 August 1999) is a Ukrainian professional footballer who plays as a right midfielder for Inhulets Petrove.

== Playing career ==
Kasimov signed a one-and-a-half-year contract with Kremin Kremenchuk in April 2023. He took the number 77 shirt. He made his debut for Kremin on 16 April as a 69th-minute substitute in a 2–0 loss against Polissya Zhytomyr. At the end of December 2023 he left Kremin. In February 2024 Kasimov signed for Ahrobiznes Volochysk. In June 2025 his contract expired, and it wasn't extended by the club.

== Honours ==
Zirka Kropyvnytskyi

- Ukrainian First League: 2015–16
