= Oleksii Slutskyi =

Ukrainian footballer (born 2002)

Personal information
- Full name: Oleksii Andriiovych Slutskyi
- Date of birth: 2 June 2002 (age 24)
- Place of birth: Kyiv, Ukraine
- Height: 1.90 m (6 ft 3 in)
- Position: Goalkeeper

Team information
- Current team: Inhulets Petrove
- Number: 24

Youth career
- 2015–2019: Dynamo Kyiv

Senior career*
Years	Team	Apps	(Gls)
2020–2021	Vorskla Poltava	0	(0)
2021–2023	Obolon Kyiv	0	(0)
2023	Kremin Kremenchuk	5	(0)
2023	Kremin-2 Kremenchuk	8	(0)
2024–2026	Chaika Petropavlivska Borshchahivka	7	(0)
2025–	Inhulets Petrove	4	(0)
- * Club domestic league appearances and goals as of 4 June 2026

Oleksii Slutskyi (Ukrainian: Олексій Андрійович Слуцький; born 2 February 2002) is a Ukrainian professional footballer who plays as a goalkeeper for Ukrainian club Inhulets Petrove.

== Career ==
Slutskyi began his football education at Dynamo Kyiv junior squads and Academy. He wanted to play like German goalkeeper Manuel Neuer.

=== Vorskla Poltava ===
Slutskyi signed for Ukrainian Premier League club Vorskla Poltava in September 2020. He took number 81 shirt. He played for Vorskla Reserves and Youth Team in 12 matches.

=== Obolon Kyiv ===
Slutskyi moved to a Ukrainian First League club Obolon Kyiv on 7 August 2021. He signed a contract until 30 June 2023 and took number 12 shirt. On 19 February 2023 Slutskyi and Obolon terminated the contract by mutual agreement.

=== Kremin Kremenchuk ===
On 6 March 2023 Slutskyi moved to Ukrainian First League club Kremin Kremenchuk. He signed a two-year contract and took number 57 shirt.
