= Sergey Kramarenko =

Sergey or Sergei Kramarenko may refer to:

- Sergey Kramarenko (pilot) (1923–2020), Soviet Air Force officer
- Sergey Kramarenko (footballer, born 1946) (1946–2008), Soviet footballer
- Sergei Kramarenko (footballer, born 1994) (born 1994), Russian footballer
