= Yuriy Kulish =

Ukrainian footballer (born 1963)

Personal information
- Full name: Yuriy Petrovych Kulish
- Date of birth: 22 August 1963 (age 63)
- Place of birth: Dnipropetrovsk, Ukrainian SSR
- Height: 1.80 m (5 ft 11 in)
- Position: Defender

Team information
- Current team: Krystal Kherson (manager)

Youth career
- 1980–1981: Dnipro Dnipropetrovsk

Senior career*
Years	Team	Apps	(Gls)
1981	Dnipro Cherkasy	3	(0)
1982	Meliorator Kzyl-Orda	34	(8)
1983–1984	Dinamo Kirov	45	(5)
1985–1987	Sokol Saratov	94	(13)
1987–1988	Rotor Volgograd	44	(6)
1989	Chornomorets Odesa	1	(0)
1989–1990	Dnipro Dnipropetrovsk	7	(0)
1990–1991	Chornomorets Odesa	20	(1)
1991	Tiligul Tiraspol	20	(5)
1992	Nyva Ternopil	21	(5)
1993	Evis Mykolaiv	19	(4)
1993	Äppelbo AIK		
1993	Evis Mykolaiv	19	(6)
1994	Tiligul Tiraspol	17	(9)
1994–1995	Mykolaiv	23	(2)
1996	Nyva Ternopil	12	(0)
1996	Nosta Novotroitsk	18	(4)
1997	Lada-Grad Dimitrovgrad	3	(0)
1997	Transmash Mogilev	13	(6)
1998–1999	Dnister Ovidiopol	15	(3)

Managerial career
- 2001–2002: Constructorul Cioburciu
- 2003–2004: Sheriff-2 Tiraspol
- 2004–2006: Tiraspol
- 2006–2007: Dinamo Minsk (assistant)
- 2007–2008: Sheriff-2 Tiraspol (assistant)
- 2008–2011: Sheriff Tiraspol (assistant)
- 2011–2012: Arsenal Kyiv (assistant)
- 2013: Kuban Krasnodar (assistant)
- 2013–2014: Lokomotiv Moscow (assistant)
- 2014–2016: Kuban Krasnodar (assistant)
- 2017: Sumy (assistant)
- 2021–: Krystal Kherson
- * Club domestic league appearances and goals

Yuriy Petrovych Kulish (Ukrainian: Юрій Петрович Куліш; Russian: Юрий Петрович Кулиш; born 22 August 1963) is a Ukrainian professional football coach and a former player.

He has worked as an assistant to Leonid Kuchuk in several clubs.

== European club competitions ==
- 1989–90 European Cup with FC Dnipro Dnipropetrovsk: 4 games.
- 1990–91 UEFA Cup with FC Chornomorets Odesa: 2 games.
