= Ivan Kuts =

Ukrainian footballer (born 2000)

Personal information
- Full name: Ivan Oleksandrovych Kuts
- Date of birth: 20 January 2000 (age 26)
- Place of birth: Kremenchuk, Ukraine
- Height: 1.90 m (6 ft 3 in)
- Position: Centre-forward

Team information
- Current team: Kremin Kremenchuk
- Number: 55

Youth career
- 2014: Naftokhimik Kremenchuk
- 2014–2017: Kremin Kremenchuk
- 2017: Velyki Krynky
- 2018–2019: Kremin Kremenchuk

Senior career*
Years	Team	Apps	(Gls)
2018–2020	Kremin Kremenchuk	12	(0)
2019	→ Nikopol (loan)	10	(1)
2020	Velyki Krynky	2	(2)
2020–2021	Olimpiya Savyntsi	20	(8)
2021	Druzhba Ocheretuvate	19	(5)
2022	Kremin Kremenchuk	10	(1)
2023–2024	Rokyta	14	(10)
2024–	Kremin Kremenchuk	17	(3)
- * Club domestic league appearances and goals as of 23 October 2024

Ivan Oleksandrovych Kuts (Ukrainian: Іван Олександрович Куць; born 20 January 2000) is a Ukrainian professional footballer who plays as a centre-forward for Ukrainian club Kremin Kremenchuk.

== Career ==
=== Kremin ===
On 5 September 2018 in a friendly match against Barsa Sumyfor Kremin U-19, Kuts scored four goals in a single match.

=== Nikopol ===
In early part of 2019 Kremins director Andriy Nediak sent Kuts on loan for the rest of the season to Ukrainian Second League club FC Nikopol. Club leadership felt it would be too difficult for Kuts to challenge for playing time with more experienced players in Artem Kozlov and Roman Loktionov.

=== Return to Kremin ===
In 2022 he moved back to Kremin Kremenchuk and in January 2023 he left the club with mutual agreement.

=== Rokyta ===
Kuts then joined amateur club FC Rokyta that plays in Poltava Oblast championship. He made his debut for Rokyta on 30 April playing for 80 minutes in a 3:0 win against Vorskla academy. He also scored a goal in that match. Kuts played for fourteen matches scoring ten goals in Poltava Oblast championship.

=== Return to Kremin ===
On 1 March 2024 Kremin Kremenchuk announced that Kuts returned to the club for his third spell. He took the number 55 shirt.

== Career statistics ==
As of 28 February 2024

Appearances and goals by club, season and competition
Club	Season	League			Cup		Other		Total	
Club	Season	Division	Apps	Goals	Apps	Goals	Apps	Goals	Apps	Goals
Kremin	2018–19	Ukrainian First League U-19 Championship	—		—		—		—	
Kremin	2018–19	Ukrainian Second League	7	0	—		—		7	0
Kremin	Total		7	0	—		—		7	0
Nikopol	2018–19	Second League	10	1	—		—		10	1
Kremin	2019–20	First League	5	0	—		—		5	0
Velyki Krynky	2020	Football Championship of Poltava Oblast	2	2	—		—		2	2
Olimpiya Savyntsi	2020–21	Ukrainian Amateur Football Championship	20	8	—		7	2	27	10
Druzhba Ocheretuvate	2021	Football Championship of Poltava Oblast	19	5	—		—		19	5
Kremin	2022–23	First League	10	1	—		—		10	1
Rokyta	2023	Football Championship of Poltava Oblast	14	10	—		—		14	10
Kremin	2023–24	First League	0	0	—		—		0	0
Kremin	Kremin total		22	1	—		—		22	1
Career total			87	27	—		7	2	94	29

== Honours ==
Olimpiya Savyntsi

- Ukrainian Amateur Cup: 2020–21
