= Daniil Yermolov =

Ukrainian footballer

Personal information
- Full name: Daniil Fedorovych Yermolov
- Date of birth: 3 December 2000 (age 25)
- Place of birth: Bashtanka, Ukraine
- Height: 1.96 m (6 ft 5 in)
- Position: Goalkeeper

Team information
- Current team: SC Poltava
- Number: 96

Youth career
- 2012–2014: DYuSSh-3 Mykolaiv
- 2014–2016: DVUFK Dnipro
- 2017: Stal Kamianske

Senior career*
| Years | Team | Apps | (Gls) |
| 2017–2018 | Stal Kamianske | 0 | (0) |
| 2018–2019 | Volyn Lutsk | 0 | (0) |
| 2019–2021 | Nyva Ternopil | 12 | (0) |
| 2021–2023 | Kremin Kremenchuk | 17 | (0) |
| 2023 | → Metalist Kharkiv (loan) | 13 | (0) |
| 2023–2025 | Vorskla Poltava | 0 | (0) |
| 2025– | Poltava | 4 | (0) |
- * Club domestic league appearances and goals as of 24 December 2025

Daniil Fedorovych Yermolov (Ukrainian: Даніїл Федорович Єрмолов; born 3 December 2000) is a Ukrainian professional footballer who plays as a goalkeeper for Ukrainian club SC Poltava.

In July 2023 after returning from loan to Metalist Kharkiv, Yermolov signed for Vorskla Poltava. He made his debut in a friendly match against SC Poltava.
