= Oleh Kramarenko (footballer, born 1994) =

Ukrainian footballer

Personal information
- Full name: Oleh Stanislavovych Kramarenko
- Date of birth: 27 August 1994 (age 32)
- Place of birth: Mykolaiv, Ukraine
- Height: 1.70 m (5 ft 7 in)
- Position: Striker

Team information
- Current team: FC Torpedo Mykolaiv

Youth career
- 2007–2008: Youth Sportive School Mykolaiv
- 2008–2011: FC Torpedo Mykolaiv

Senior career*
Years	Team	Apps	(Gls)
2011–2012	FC Torpedo Mykolaiv (Amateur)	9	(0)
2012–2014	SC Tavriya Simferopol	1	(0)
2014	FC Torpedo Mykolaiv (Amateur)	4	(2)
2015	FC Myr Hornostayivka (Amateur)	2	(0)
2015–2016	FC Berkut Armyansk (Amateur)	8	(0)
2016–2017	FC Vradiyivka (Amateur)	10	(4)
2021–	FC Vast Mykolaiv		
- * Club domestic league appearances and goals

Oleh Kramarenko (Ukrainian: Олег Станіславович Крамаренко; born 27 August 1994) is a professional Ukrainian football striker who played for the Ukrainian Premier League club SC Tavriya Simferopol.

Kramarenko is the product of Mykolaiv youth sportive school and FC Torpedo Mykolaiv. He made his debut for SC Tavriya Simferopol as start-game player in the game against FC Illichivets Mariupol on 16 May 2014 in Ukrainian Premier League.
