= Dmytro Nazarenko (footballer) =

Ukrainian footballer (born 1987)

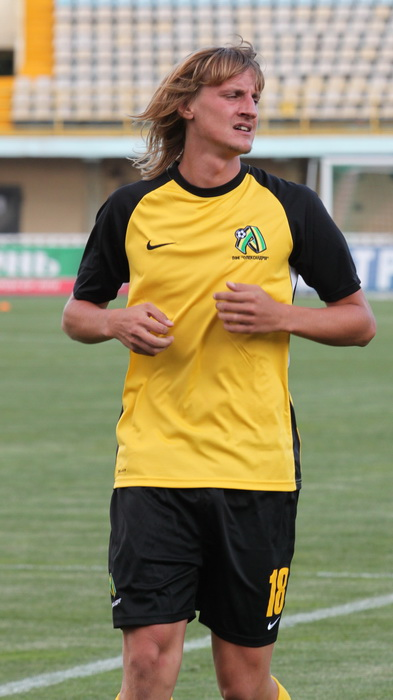

Personal information
- Full name: Dmytro Mykolayovych Nazarenko
- Date of birth: 14 September 1987 (age 39)
- Place of birth: Donetsk, Ukrainian SSR, Soviet Union
- Height: 1.85 m (6 ft 1 in)
- Position: Defender

Team information
- Current team: Kudrivka (coach)

Youth career
- 1999–2004: FC Donbas Donetsk

Senior career*
| Years | Team | Apps | (Gls) |
| 2004–2005 | Vorksla-2 Poltava | 13 | (0) |
| 2006–2008 | Metalurh Donetsk | 2 | (0) |
| 2008–2009 | Stal Alchevsk | 21 | (0) |
| 2009 | Banants | 2 | (0) |
| 2010–2011 | Stal Alchevsk | 32 | (0) |
| 2011–2013 | Oleksandriya | 20 | (0) |
| 2013–2014 | Poltava | 1 | (0) |
| 2014 | Stal Alchevsk | 16 | (0) |
| 2015 | Spartaks Jūrmala | 10 | (0) |
| 2016–2019 | Mykolaiv | 43 | (0) |
| 2016–2019 | Mykolaiv-2 | 3 | (0) |
| Total | | 163 | (0) |

International career^{‡}
| 2005 | Ukraine-18 | 12 | (0) |
| 2005 | Ukraine-19 | 6 | (0) |

Managerial career
- 2019: MFC Mykolaiv (assistant)
- 2020: MFC Mykolaiv-2 (assistant)
- 2020–2021: MFC Mykolaiv (assistant)
- 2022: Vast Mykolaiv
- 2022–2023: Vast Mykolaiv (assistant)
- 2023: Kremin Kremenchuk (assistant)
- 2023–2024: FC Kudrivka (assistant)
- 2024: Kudrivka-Nyva (assistant)
- * Club domestic league appearances and goals as of 4 June 2019 ‡ National team caps and goals as of 20 January 2016

Dmytro Nazarenko (Ukrainian: Дмитро Миколайович Назаренко; born 14 September 1987) is a retired Ukrainian football defender.

Nazarenko was born in Donetsk and began playing professional football with FC Vorskla Poltava's second team. Unlike many footballers from Donetsk who dedicate their career to FC Shakhtar Donetsk, Nazarenko spent most of his career in neighboring Alchevsk. He would next spend 2.5 years with his hometown club FC Metalurh Donetsk, appearing in two Ukrainian Premier League and a few UEFA Europa League matches. He moved on loan to Stal Alchevsk for the 2008–09 Ukrainian First League season, and then went to FC Banants of the Armenian Premier League for a short-term loan in 2009.

== Coaching career ==
=== Kremin ===
Nazarenko joined Kremin Kremenchuk in June 2023. On 27 November 2023 Kremin announced that Nazarenko and the club agreed on mutual contract termination.

=== Kudrivka ===
Nazarenko followed Roman Loktionov to Kudrivka on 27 November 2023.
