= Danylo Arkusha =

Ukrainian footballer

Personal information
- Full name: Danylo Serhiyovych Arkusha
- Date of birth: 24 November 2001 (age 24)
- Place of birth: Kirovohrad, Ukraine
- Height: 1.96 m (6 ft 5 in)
- Position: Centre-back

Team information
- Current team: Inhulets Petrove
- Number: 97

Youth career
- 2012-2018: Zirka Kropyvnytsky
- 2018-2021: Olimpik Kropyvnytskyi

Senior career*
Years	Team	Apps	(Gls)
2021–2022	Zirka Kropyvnytsky	10	(1)
2022–2025	Kremin Kremenchuk	48	(0)
2025	Dnister Zalishchyky	6	(0)
2026–	Inhulets Petrove	2	(0)
- * Club domestic league appearances and goals as of 4 June 2026

Danylo Serhiyovych Arkusha (Ukrainian: Данило Сергійович Аркуша; born 24 November 2001) is a Ukrainian professional footballer who plays as a centre-back for Ukrainian club Inhulets Petrove.

He signed with Kremin on 24 August 2022 for a three-year contract.
