= Simon Haloian =

Ukrainian footballer (born 2002)

Personal information
- Full name: Simon Ohanesovych Haloian
- Date of birth: 2 July 2002 (age 24)
- Place of birth: Solnechnogorsk, Russia
- Height: 1.75 m (5 ft 9 in)
- Position: Central midfielder

Team information
- Current team: Chernihiv (on loan from Livyi Bereh Kyiv)
- Number: 12

Youth career
- 2015–2020: Zmina-Obolon Kyiv

Senior career*
Years	Team	Apps	(Gls)
2020–2021	Obolon-2 Bucha	13	(0)
2021	Obolon Kyiv	1	(0)
2021–2024	Kremin Kremenchuk	66	(5)
2024–2025	Oleksandriya-2	16	(1)
2025	Oleksandriya	1	(0)
2025–	Livyi Bereh Kyiv	22	(3)
2025–2026	Livyi Bereh-2 Kyiv	5	(0)
2026–	→ Chernihiv (loan)	11	(1)
- * Club domestic league appearances and goals as of 1 November 2026

Simon Ohanesovych Haloian (Ukrainian: Сімон Оганесович Галоян; born 2 July 2002) is a Ukrainian professional footballer who plays as a central midfielder for Ukrainian club Chernihiv on loan from Livyi Bereh Kyiv.

== Club career ==
=== Kremin Kremenchuk ===
Haloian joined Kremin Kremenchuk in 2021. He spent three seasons with the club, playing in sixty-seven matches. He scored five goals and provided five assists. He left Kremin in summer of 2024.

=== Oleksandriya ===
On 8 July 2024, Ukrainian Premier League club Oleksandriya announced that Haloian signed a contract with the club until 31 May 2026. He was assigned to their reserve squad Oleksandriya-2 in the Ukrainian Second League.

=== Livyi Bereh Kyiv ===
On 18 July 2025, he signed for Livyi Bereh Kyiv in Ukrainian First League.

==== Chernihiv ====
On 17 July 2026 he was loaned to Chernihiv in Ukrainian First League untit the end of 2026. On 25 July 2026, he made his debut with the new club against Lokomotyv Kyiv in Ukrainian First League. On 23 August 2026, he scored his first goal with the new club against LSTM 536 Lutsk in Ukrainian Cup.

== Career statistics ==
=== Club ===
As of match played 1 November 2026

Appearances and goals by club, season and competition
Club	Season	League			Cup		Europe		Other		Total	
Club	Season	Division	Apps	Goals	Apps	Goals	Apps	Goals	Apps	Goals	Apps	Goals
Obolon-2 Bucha	2020–21	Ukrainian Second League	13	0	0	0	0	0	0	0	13	0
Obolon Kyiv	2020–21	Ukrainian First League	1	0	0	0	0	0	0	0	1	0
Kremin Kremenchuk	2021–22	Ukrainian First League	17	0	0	0	0	0	0	0	17	0
Kremin Kremenchuk	2022–23	Ukrainian First League	21	1	0	0	0	0	0	0	21	1
Kremin Kremenchuk	2023–24	Ukrainian First League	28	4	1	0	0	0	0	0	29	4
Oleksandriya	2024–25	Ukrainian Premier League	1	0	0	0	0	0	0	0	1	0
Oleksandriya-2	2024–25	Ukrainian Second League	16	1	0	0	0	0	0	0	16	1
Livyi Bereh Kyiv	2025–26	Ukrainian First League	22	3	1	0	0	0	0	0	23	5
Livyi Bereh-2 Kyiv	2025–26	Ukrainian Second League	5	0	0	0	0	0	0	0	5	0
Chernihiv (loan)	2026–27	Ukrainian First League	11	1	3	1	0	0	0	0	14	2
Chernihiv (loan)	Total		11	1	3	1	0	0	0	0	14	2
Career total			135	10	5	1	0	0	0	0	140	11

== Honours ==
Oleksandriya

- Ukrainian Premier League: Runner-up 2024–25
