= Yaroslav Zdyrko =

Ukrainian coach (born 1987)

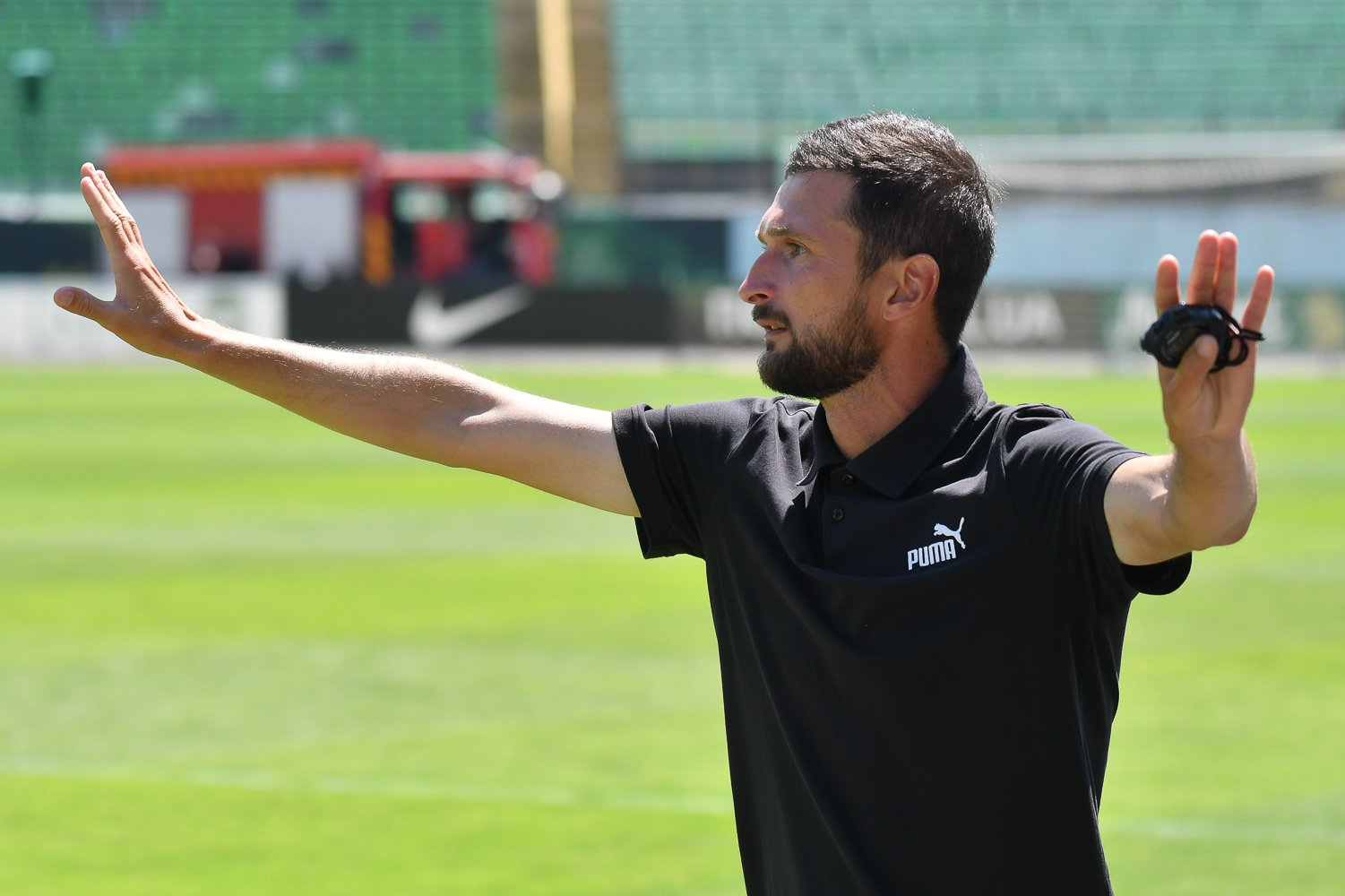

Personal information
- Full name: Yaroslav Pavlovych Zdyrko
- Date of birth: 30 April 1987 (age 39)
- Place of birth: Kremenchuk, Ukraine

Team information
- Current team: Kremin-2 Kremenchuk (head coach)

Youth career
- 2000-2001: DYuSSh Kremenchuk
- 2001-2002: KODYuSSh Shchaslyve
- 2003: Piddubny Olympic College
- 2004: Kremin Kremenchuk

Senior career*
Years	Team	Apps	(Gls)
2018	Naftokhimik Kremenchuk	2	(0)
2023–	Inter-Avto 2 Kremenchuk (futsal)	12	(5)

Managerial career
- 2023–2024: Kremin-2 Kremenchuk
- * Club domestic league appearances and goals

Yaroslav Zdyrko (Ukrainian: Ярослав Павлович Здирко; born 30 April 1987) is a former Ukrainian footballer and Ukrainian football coach of a Second League club Kremin-2 Kremenchuk.

== Early life ==
Zdurko was born in Kremenchuk. He began playing when he was ten years old. He trained with city youth teams.

== Career ==
Zdyrko played for amateur clubs Vahonobudivnyk, Komunar and Naftokhimik. He also played for following Kremenchuk futsal teams: Olsu, Elektrocenter, Deiivka, JTI in 2022. During 2023 he was playing for Inter-Avto and Inter-Avto 2.

== Managerial career ==
=== Kremin ===
He began managing youth teams in Kremin during 2012. In his time with the club he trained Kremin-2002, Kremin-2006, Kremin-2014.

=== Kremin-2 ===
Zdyrko was appointed as the manager of the Ukrainian Second League team Kremin-2 on 14 February 2023. He replaced Yuriy Chumak and signed a one-year contract. His first games in charge were in 2023 PFL Winter Cup. On 24 September 2023 Roman Loktionov resigned as manager of Kremin. He was offered Kremin-2 managerial position. When Loctionov accepted, Zdyrko became his assistant. When Loctionov left to manage a new club, Zdyrko was reappointed manager on 27 November 2023.

== Managerial statistics ==
As of 19 July 2024

Team	From	To	Record								
Team	From	To	G	W	D	L	GF	GA	GD	Win %	Ref
Kremin-2 Kremenchuk	14 February 2023	24 September 2023	16	0	1	15	6	49	−43	0.00	
Kremin-2 Kremenchuk	27 November 2023	1 July 2024	7	1	1	5	4	15	−11	14.29	
Total			23	1	2	20	10	64	−54	4.35	—

== Honours ==
Individual

- Football Federation of Poltavshchyna: The best coach of the youth team: 2018
