= Yevhenii Kostiuk =

Ukrainian footballer (born 2002)

Personal information
- Full name: Yevhenii Valentynovych Kostiuk
- Date of birth: 28 January 2002 (age 24)
- Place of birth: Vinnytsia, Ukraine
- Height: 1.75 m (5 ft 9 in)
- Position: Defender

Team information
- Current team: Kremin Kremenchuk
- Number: 14

Youth career
- 2013–2019: Youth Sportive School Vinnytsia
- 2019–2020: Nyva Vinnytsia

Senior career*
Years	Team	Apps	(Gls)
2020–2021	Nyva Vinnytsia	10	(2)
2021–2023	Kolos Kovalivka	0	(0)
2021–2023	→ Nyva Vinnytsia (loan)	18	(1)
2023–	Kremin Kremenchuk	10	(0)
- * Club domestic league appearances and goals as of 2 November 2023

Yevhenii Valentynovych Kostiuk (Ukrainian: Євгеній Валентинович Костюк; born 28 January 2002) is a Ukrainian football defender. He is currently playing for Kremin Kremenchuk.

== Career ==
Kostiuk, born in Vinnytsia, is a product of his native city youth sportive school and after continued his youth career in Nyva Vinnytsia youth sportive system.

=== Kolos Kovalivka ===
After playing in the Ukrainian Second League, Kostiuk signed a deal with the Ukrainian Premier League side Kolos Kovalivka in January 2021.
