= 2020 Football Championship of Kirovohrad Oblast =

Football championship in Ukraine

Football Championship of Kirovohrad Oblast
- Season: 2020
- Champions: Lokomotyv SVT Pomichna

The 2020 Football Championship of Kirovohrad Oblast was won by Lokomotyv SVT Pomichna.

== League table ==
Pos	Team	Pld	W	D	L	GF	GA	GD	Pts	Qualification or relegation
1	Lokomotyv SVT Pomichna (C)	12	8	4	0	22	8	+14	28	Champions
2	Inhul-Ahro-Lend Berezivka	12	6	5	1	25	9	+16	23	
3	FC Novoukrayinka	12	6	3	3	24	18	+6	21	
4	Ahrotekh Tyshkivka	12	5	5	2	28	16	+12	20	
5	Inhul Pervozvanivka	12	3	4	5	14	20	−6	13	
6	Olimpik-SDIuShOR-2	12	1	4	7	16	28	−12	7	
7	Lokomotyv Znamianka	12	0	1	11	9	39	−30	1	

Source: "НОВИНИ - ПІДСУМКОВА ТАБЛИЦЯ ЧЕМПІОНАТУ ОБЛАСТІ". Kirovohrad Oblast Association of Football. Archived from the original on 2020-11-24.
(C) Champions
