= Andrii Hloba =

Ukrainian footballer

Personal information
- Full name: Andrii Oleksandrovych Hloba
- Date of birth: 24 January 1999 (age 27)
- Place of birth: Petrokorbivka, Kirovohrad Oblast, Ukraine
- Height: 1.73 m (5 ft 8 in)
- Position: Midfielder

Team information
- Current team: Ahrobiznes Volochysk
- Number: 24

Youth career
- 2011–2015: Ametyst Oleksandriia

Senior career*
Years	Team	Apps	(Gls)
2015–2016	Holovkivka	20	(5)
2016–2017	Inhulets-3 Petrove	10	(4)
2017–2018	Inhulets Petrove	0	(0)
2017–2018	→ Inhulets-2 Petrove	37	(4)
2018–2021	Oleksandriya	3	(0)
2021–2022	Sumy	11	(1)
2022–2024	Kremin Kremenchuk	41	(4)
2024–	Ahrobiznes Volochysk	17	(1)
- * Club domestic league appearances and goals as of 10 June 2025

Andrii Oleksandrovych Hloba (Ukrainian: Андрій Олександрович Глоба; born 24 January 1999) is a Ukrainian professional footballer who plays as a midfielder for FC Ahrobiznes Volochysk.

== Career ==
Hloba is a product of the different youth sportive school systems from Kirovohrad Oblast.

After spent career in the teams of amateur or lower level, in July 2018 he signed a deal with the Premier League club FC Oleksandriya and made his debut in the Ukrainian Premier League on 24 October 2020, playing as the second half-time substituted player in an away losing match against FC Dynamo Kyiv.

=== Kremin ===
On 12 June 2024 Hloba was released by Kremin having made forty-one appearances and scoring four goals.

=== Ahrobiznes ===
Hloba joined Ukrainian First League club Ahrobiznes Volochysk in June 2024.
