= FC Krystal Oleksandriia =

Ukrainian youth football club

Club crest

Youth FC Krystal Oleksandriia (Ukrainian: «Кристал» (Олександрія)) is a Ukrainian youth football club based in Oleksandriya, previously also known as MFC Oleksandriya (Ukrainian: МФК "Олександрія" — Municipal Football Club of Oleksandriya).

== History ==
An attempt to create a professional club was an initiative of the first mayor of Oleksandria, Stepan Tsapyuk, based on a city football school "Krystal".

For the 2004–05 and 2005–06 season, as a professional team MFC Oleksandriya was admitted to the Druha Liha around the key regulation according to which a team is obligated to spend a season at amateur level before being admitted to professional competitions.

After Stepan Tsapyuk lost next mayoral elections, the professional team was dissolved without any significant trace and creation of the club fell through.

== League and cup history ==
| Season | Div. | Pos. | Pl. | W | D | L | GS | GA | P | Domestic Cup | Europe | Notes |
|---|---|---|---|---|---|---|---|---|---|---|---|---|
| 2004-05 | 3rd | 7 | 28 | 8 | 8 | 12 | 32 | 40 | 32 | 1/32 finals | | |
| 2005-06 | 3rd | 12 | 24 | 4 | 2 | 18 | 20 | 37 | 14 | 1/32 finals | | |

== See also ==
- PFC Olexandria
- FC Olimpik Kropyvnytskyi
