= Roman Loktionov (footballer, born 1986) =

Ukrainian footballer

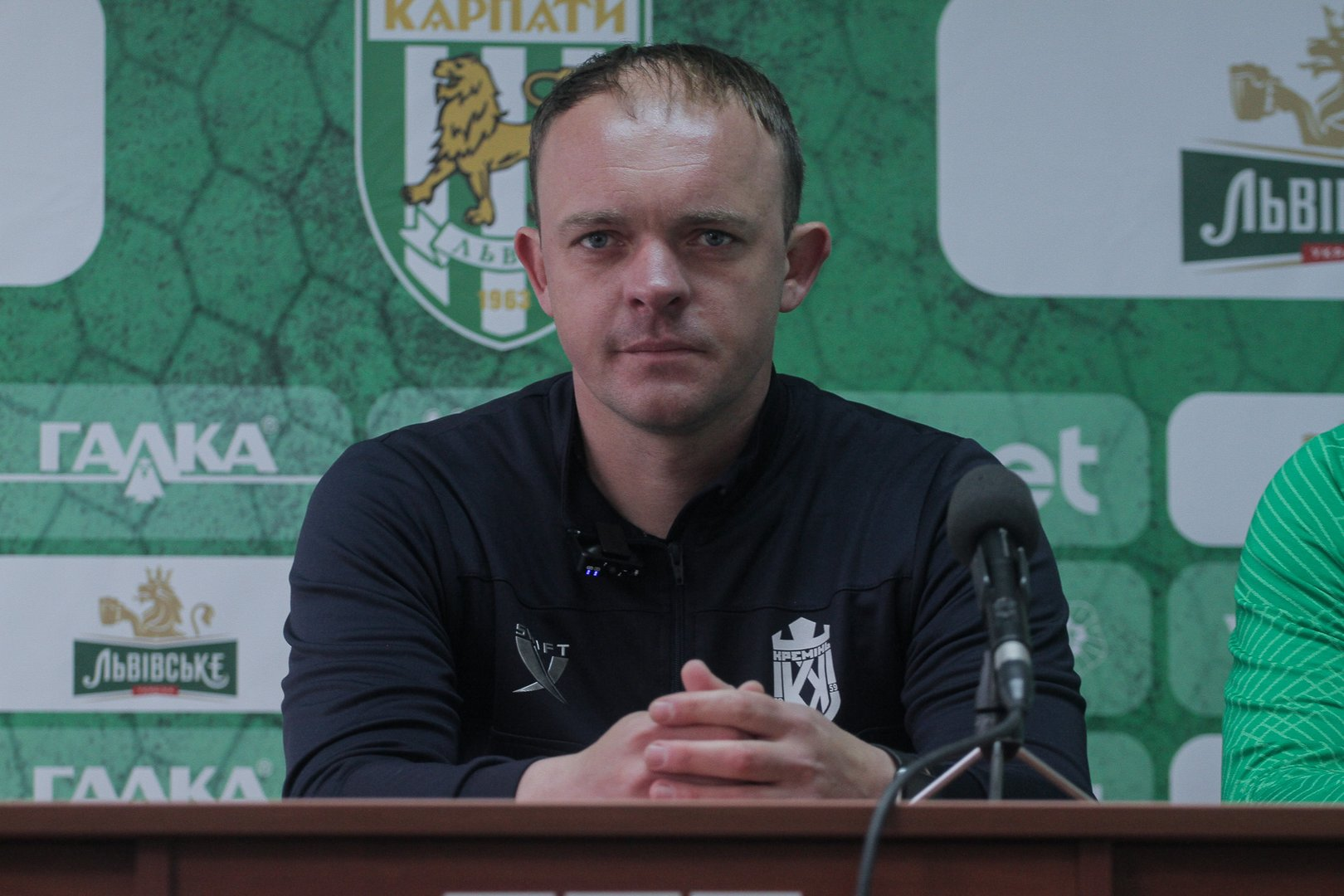

Personal information
- Full name: Roman Borysovych Loktionov
- Date of birth: 18 October 1986 (age 40)
- Place of birth: Oleksandriia, Ukrainian SSR
- Height: 1.84 m (6 ft 0 in)
- Position: Forward

Youth career
- 2001–2004: Krystal Oleksandria

Senior career*
Years	Team	Apps	(Gls)
2004–2006	Oleksandriya	30	(3)
2007–2008	Kremin Kremenchuk	52	(21)
2008–2010	Vorskla Poltava	7	(0)
2009–2010	→ Oleksandriya (loan)	20	(2)
2010–2013	Stal Alchevsk	86	(19)
2013–2014	Oleksandriya	3	(0)
2014	Stal Alchevsk	17	(5)
2015–2016	Zirka Kropyvnytskyi	42	(9)
2017	Neman Grodno	13	(3)
2017	Inhulets Petrove	10	(2)
2018	Cherkashchyna-Akademiya Bilozirya	27	(11)
2019	Kremin Kremenchuk	16	(4)
2019	Kremin-Yunior Kremenchuk	0	(0)
2020	LNZ-Lebedyn	?	(?)

Managerial career
- 2019: Kremin-Yunior Kremenchuk
- 2021: Kremin Kremenchuk (assistant)
- 2021–2022: Kremin Kremenchuk (caretaker)
- 2022–2023: Kremin Kremenchuk
- 2023: Kremin-2 Kremenchuk
- 2023–2024: Kudrivka
- 2025–: Oleksandriya (U19)
- * Club domestic league appearances and goals as of 00:03, 18 September 2019 (UTC)

Roman Borysovych Loktionov (Ukrainian: Роман Борисович Локтіонов; born on 18 October 1986) is a Ukrainian retired footballer who played as a forward and current manager.

== Managerial career ==
=== Kremin Kremenchuk ===
Loctionov joined Kremin Kremenchuk in January 2020. He became an assistant to manager Oleksiy Hodin on 6 January 2021. After a loss to VPK-Ahro Shevchenkivka Hodin and Loctionov resigned on 30 April 2021. For the season he assisted Ihor Stolovytskyi for the 2021–22 Ukrainian First League season. When Stolovytskyi left Kremin, Loctionov was appointed interim manager on 26 October 2021. Loktionov submitted his resignation to Kremin owner. Serhii Kovnir accepted it. After nine games this season his team conceded twenty-two goals, more than any other team in both groups of First League.

=== Kremin-2 Kremenchuk ===
Loctionov was appointed manager of Kremin-2 Kremenchuk. Yaroslav Zdyrko who was a manager before him, became his assistant. On 27 November 2023 Kremin announced that Loctionov and the club agreed on mutual contract termination. He was in charge for nine matches, drawing two and losing seven.

=== Kudrivka ===
Loctionov was appointed manager of Kudrivka on 27 November 2023.

=== Oleksandriya U19 ===
In June 2025, he was appointed manager of Oleksandriya U19.

== Honours ==
Zirka Kropyvnytskyi

- Ukrainian First League: 2015–16

Vorskla Poltava

- Ukrainian Cup: 2008–09
