= FC Rubikon Kyiv =

Rubikon Kyiv
- Full name: Football Club Rubikon Kyiv
- Founded: 2017
- Dissolved: 2023
- Ground: City Stadium, Vyshneve; Ekonomist Stadium, Kyiv; Atlet Stadium, Kyiv
- Chairman: Oleh Birun
- Manager: Viktor Kuryata
- League: Ukrainian Second League
- 2020–21: Ukrainian Second League, Group A, 11th of 13
- Website: https://www.rubiconfc.com.ua/
Home colours	Away colours

Football Club Rubikon Kyiv (Ukrainian: Футбольний клуб «Рубікон») is a Ukrainian football club from the city of Kyiv. In 2018–2020 it was also representing the Kyiv's satellite city of Vyshneve carrying name of Rubikon-Vyshneve Kyiv. The team has been withdrawn from professional competitions at the end of 2022.

== History ==
The team was founded in 2017. "Rubikon" debuted in the Ukrainian Second League in the 2020–21 season.

During 2022–23 season winter break it was announced Rubikon Kyiv and OKKO Kharkiv signed an agreement on cooperation and in the second half were planning to field a joint team. As a joint team they took part in the Makarov Tournament (conducted by the Kyiv Oblast Association of Football) and reached finals where they lost to Shturm Ivankiv. However, in the 2023 PFL Winter Cup competed only OKKO and just before the start of the second half, it was announced that Rubikon withdrew, and its players became free agents.

In March 2023 the club withdrew from competitions due to lack of interest from investors.

=== Former names ===
- 2017–2017 Rubikon Kyiv
- 2017–2020 Rubikon-Vyshneve Kyiv
- 2020– Rubikon Kyiv

== League and cup history ==
Season	Div.	Pos.	Pl.	W	D	L	GS	GA	P	Domestic Cup	Europe	Notes
2017–18	4th "2"	8_{/8}	14	1	1	12	9	32	4			
2018–19	4th "2"	10_{/12}	22	7	5	10	27	29	26			
2019–20	4th "2"	6_{/12}	22	8	7	7	25	36	31			Promoted
2020–21	3rd "A"	11_{/13}	24	4	5	15	17	44	17			
2021–22	3rd "A"	13_{/15}	18	3	2	13	12	38	11			
2022–23	3rd	10_{/10}	18	1	1	16	6	36	4			Withdrew

== Managers ==
- 2017–2020 Viktor Kuriata
- 2020–2021 Serhiy Litovchenko
- 2021– Viktor Kuriata
