= Viktor Pylypenko (footballer) =

Ukrainian footballer (born 2000)

Personal information
- Full name: Viktor Andriyovych Pylypenko
- Date of birth: 30 April 2000 (age 26)
- Place of birth: Kremenchuk, Ukraine
- Height: 1.84 m (6 ft 0 in)
- Position: Centre-back

Team information
- Current team: Vorskla Poltava

Youth career
- 2013–2014: Kremin Kremenchuk
- 2014: Naftokhimik Kremenchuk
- 2014–2017: Kremin Kremenchuk

Senior career*
Years	Team	Apps	(Gls)
2017–	Vorskla Poltava	0	(0)
2020	→ Kremin Kremenchuk (loan)	10	(0)
2020–2021	→ Peremoha Dnipro (loan)	7	(0)
2021	→ Sumy (loan)	10	(0)
2021–2023	→ Kremin Kremenchuk (loan)	17	(0)
- * Club domestic league appearances and goals as of 13 June 2023

Viktor Andriyovych Pylypenko (Ukrainian: Віктор Андрійович Пилипенко; born 30 April 2000) is a Ukrainian professional footballer who plays as a centre-back for Vorskla Poltava.

Pylypenko played for Ukrainian First League Club Kremin Kremenchuk on loan during 2019–20, 2021–22 and 2022–23 seasons. He featured in 28 matches, playing for 1576 minutes. During his spell he did not score any goals, received nine yellow and one red card.
