= Ihor Klymovskyi =

Ukrainian footballer and coach

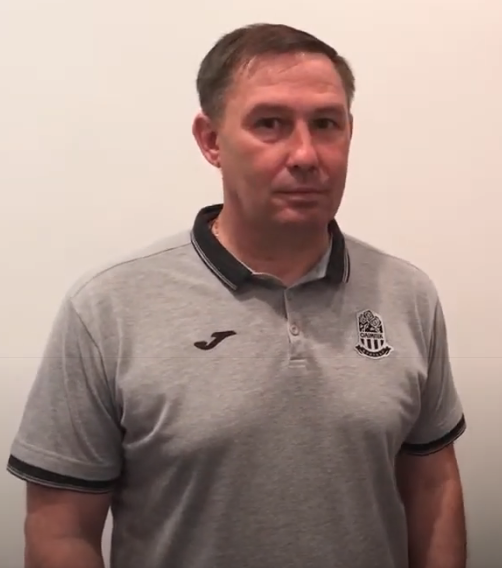

Personal information
- Full name: Ihor Petrovych Klymovskyi
- Date of birth: 17 February 1972 (age 54)
- Place of birth: Kostiantynivka, Ukrainian SSR
- Height: 1.84 m (6 ft 0 in)
- Position: Defender

Team information
- Current team: Kremin Kremenchuk (manager)

Senior career*
Years	Team	Apps	(Gls)
1993–1994	Metalurh Kostiantynivka	16	(1)
1994	Donbaskraft Kramatorsk	3	(0)
1994–1997	Metalurh Donetsk	105	(6)
1997	Alians Anapa	?	(0)
1998	Metalurh-2 Donetsk	9	(0)
1998	Kolomna	40	(0)
1999–2002	Mashynobudivnyk Druzhkivka	73	(5)
2002	Podillya Khmelnytskyi	12	(1)

Managerial career
- 2003–2014: Olimpik Donetsk (youth school)
- 2014–2016: Olimpik Donetsk (under 19)
- 2016–2019: Olimpik Donetsk (under 21)
- 2019: Olimpik Donetsk (interim)
- 2019: Olimpik Donetsk (interim)
- 2020–2021: Olimpik Donetsk
- 2021: Nyva Ternopil
- 2023–2025: Kremin Kremenchuk
- * Club domestic league appearances and goals

Ihor Klymovskyi (Ukrainian: Ігор Петрович Климовський; born 17 February 1972) is a Ukrainian professional football coach and a former player. He is current manager of Kremin Kremenchuk.

== Career ==
As a player, he spent his career in the Ukrainian and Russian football clubs. From 2002 he is a football coach and in April 2019 was appointed as interim manager for the FC Olimpik in the Ukrainian Premier League until the end of season. From April to September 2021 he was managing Nyva Ternopil.

=== Kremin ===
On 27 September Klymovskyi was appointed as a manager for the Ukrainian First League club Kremin Kremenchuk. He signed a one and a half year long contract. After his contract expired he left Kremin. During his time with the club, Klymovskyi was in charge forty three times. His team won seven, drew eleven and lost twenty-five matches. Kremin was relegated at the end of the 2024–25 season.
