= FC Vast Mykolaiv =

Vast Mykolaiv
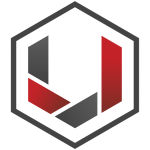
- Full name: Football Club Vast Mykolaiv
- Founded: 2014; 11 years ago
- Dissolved: 2023
- Ground: Tsentralnyi Stadion (Mykolaiv), Mykolaiv
- Capacity: 15 640
- Chairman: Stanislav Teplyak
- Manager: Ihor Yermakov
- League: Ukrainian Second League
- 2022–23: Ukrainian Second League, 7th of 10
- Website: fcvast.com.ua
Home colours	Away colours

Football Club Vast is a Ukrainian football team from the city of Mykolaiv. The club's name is known in Latin alphabet only.

== History ==
The club's history starts in May 2014 when as a football team it entered competitions of the city of Mykolaiv. The idea to create that team appeared in a local football family of Shymanets out of a populated place of Radsad and originally the team was called as Radsad. The original football club Radsad went bankrupt back in 2007, but its sports school (academy) continued to exist. The team was composed exclusively out of players from a local sports school (DYuSSh) in Radsad. After competing for few years in city and raion competitions, the family of Shymanets was joined by another football family of Teplyak to keep the team afloat.

Starting from 2018 the team entered regional competitions of Mykolaiv Oblast and changed its name to current one after its main sponsor. The established club contains its first team, a futsal team, and its football academy. Along with regional competitions, the Vast main team continued to compete in city championship.

Since 2021, the club first appeared in AAFU national amateur competitions.

Participation of Vast in competitions of the Ukrainian PFL was known before the full-scale war with Russia in February 2022. Due to the bombardment of Mykolaiv by Russians, the club was forced to relocate temporarily north to Irpin. On 16 May 2022, the vice-president of Vast acknowledged that there is not a part of Mykolaiv that was not bombarded by Russians.

== Players ==
=== Current squad ===
As of 28 December 2023

Note: Flags indicate national team as defined under FIFA eligibility rules; some limited exceptions apply. Players may hold more than one non-FIFA nationality.

No.	Pos.	Nation	Player
63	GK	UKR	Dmytro Rudyk
22	GK	UKR	Rostyslav Sydorenko
2	DF	UKR	Artem Babenko
69	DF	UKR	Dmytro Sartina
94	DF	UKR	Yan Shtyrbu
5	DF	UKR	Denys Shvydenko
99	DF	UKR	Mykola Stetsenko
27	MF	UKR	Denys Borzov
14	MF	UKR	Oleksandr Dushuk

No.	Pos.	Nation	Player
80	MF	UKR	Oleksandr Holovin
19	MF	UKR	Dmytro Humenyak
17	MF	UKR	Andriy Koloskov
28	MF	UKR	Oleh Kramarenko
10	MF	UKR	Andriy Shmat
18	MF	UKR	Mykyta Shyryayev
8	MF	UKR	Serhiy Zmiyevskyi
11	FW	UKR	Vyacheslav Studenko

== League and cup history ==
Season	Div.	Pos.	Pl.	W	D	L	GS	GA	P	Domestic Cup	Europe	Notes
2021–22	4th Group 3	4_{/9}	8	2	4	2	14	16	10			
2022–23	3rd	7_{/10}	18	5	2	11	21	28	17			
2023–24	3rd	—	10	1	1	8	8	40	4			withdrew

== Coaches ==
- 2014–2020 Anton Shymanets
- 2020 Volodymyr Zhdanyuk and Oleksandr Matrosov
- Anton Shymanets
- 2021–2022 Artem Chorniy
- 2022 Dmytro Nazarenko
- 2022–2023 Ihor Yermakov

== See also ==
- FC Enerhiya Mykolaiv
