= FC Kremin-2 Kremenchuk =

Professional football club based in Kremenchuk, Ukraine

Kremin-2 Kremenchuk
- Full name: Football Club Kremin-2 Kremenchuk
- Dissolved: 2024
- Ground: Kremin Stadium, Kremenchuk
- Capacity: 1,529
- 2023–24: Ukrainian Second League, 14th of 15 (withdrew)
- Website: https://fckremen.com.ua/

Football Club Kremin-2 Kremenchuk was a Ukrainian football team based in Kremenchuk, Ukraine, and it served as a junior team for the Kremin Kremenchuk. Like most tributary teams, the best players are sent up to the senior team, meanwhile developing other players for further call-ups.

== History ==
Competing usually at the regional level of Poltava Oblast and occasionally the national amateur competitions, in 2022 the team debuted in Ukrainian Second Division.

Notable achievements include a second-place finish at the Poltava Oblast football championship in 2000. Earlier in 1999, the team appeared in competitions among amateurs, but placed last in its group.

=== Kremin-Yunior ===
Before the start of 2019–20 season in early August, Kremin's leadership decided to field its development team for the Ukrainian Amateur Football Championship. Sporting Director Yevhen Berun announced that team will be 80% players from Kremenchuk born between 2000 and 2003. One of the reasons given for creation of the team was Second league team poaching U-19 players. Also, the leadership wanted to raise decent replacements for the main team. The club planned for the team to participate in Ukrainian Second League if the main team would remain in the First League and if the club found sponsors. Volodymyr Prokopynenko was appointed manager of the team. After playing in ten matches the team was in last place in their group, winning one match, drawing one and losing eight. Six players and the sporting director left the team. In January 2020 the team withdrew from competition, citing lack of finances.

=== 2021 ===
During the winter break in Ukrainian Second League, the team took part in Kremenchuk futsal top league, where they lost all eight matches.

=== Kit suppliers and shirt sponsors ===
Kremin-2 kits
Period	Kit manufacturer	Shirt sponsor (chest)
2019–2020	(Spain) Joma	Alfateks
2021–2022	(Ukraine) SECO	Alfateks
2022–present	(Ukraine) SWIFT	TERMINAL-MK

== League and cup history ==
Season	Div.	Pos.	Pl.	W	D	L	GS	GA	P	Domestic Cup	Notes
1998–99	Regional	12	24 (Note: Kremin-2 replaced another team from Kremenchuk Naftotrans-Polo after 7 rounds, playing for 17 matches, season table showed team playing 24 matches.)	7	4	6	23	17	35		
1999	4th	6	10	1	1	8	5	15	4		Group 4
1999–2000	Regional	2	19	11	3	5	39	22	36		
2006–07	Regional	5	20	10	1	9	37	38	31		
2019–20	4th	10	18	1	1	16	9	42	4		Withdrawn
2021	Regional	8	16	2	2	11	16	42	8		Group B (Qualifying Stage)
2021	Regional	3	8	4	0	4	20	15	12		Group A (First League)
2022–23	3rd	9	18	2	2	14	7	44	8		
2023–24	3rd	14	26	1	3	22	11	66	2		Withdrawn

== Managers ==
- (Ukraine) Anatoliy Skurskyi 1999
- (Ukraine) Stanyslav Turchenko 1999
- (Ukraine) Volodymyr Prokopynenko (2 August 2019 – 30 January 2020)
- (Ukraine) Yevhen Marynych (29 April 2021 – 17 July 2022)
- (Ukraine) Roman Loktionov (17 July 2022 – 6 November 2021)
- (Ukraine) Yuriy Chumak (August 2022 – 10 November 2022)
- (Ukraine) Yaroslav Zdyrko (14 February 2023 – 24 September 2023)
- (Ukraine) Roman Loktionov (24 September 2023 – )

== See also ==
- FC Kremin Kremenchuk
