= 2023–24 in Ukrainian football =

Football in Ukraine
- Season: 2023–24

Men's football
- Premier League: Shakhtar Donetsk
- First League: Inhulets Petrove
- Second League: Druzhba Myrivka
- AAFU: Ahrotekh Tyshkivka
- Cup: Shakhtar Donetsk
- Amateur Cup: FC Mykolaiv
- Super Cup: not held

Women's football
- Vyshcha Liha: Vorskla Poltava
- Persha Liha: Sisters Odesa
- Women's Cup: Vorskla Poltava

The 2023–24 season was the 33rd season of competitive association football in Ukraine since dissolution of the Soviet Union.

With the continuation of the Russo-Ukrainian War, the Ukrainian Association of Football (UAF) decided to go forward with continuation of another season. The UAF approved round-robin tournaments in all national league competitions under strict safety precautions.

== National teams ==
=== Ukraine national football team ===
==== UEFA Euro 2024 qualifying ====
===== Group C =====
Pos	Team	Pld	W	D	L	GF	GA	GD	Pts	Qualification	(England)	(Italy)	(Ukraine)	(North Macedonia)	(Malta)
1	England	8	6	2	0	22	4	+18	20	Qualify for final tournament	—	3–1	2–0	7–0	2–0
2	Italy	8	4	2	2	16	9	+7	14 (Note: Head-to-head points: Italy 4, Ukraine 1.)	Qualify for final tournament	1–2	—	2–1	5–2	4–0
3	Ukraine	8	4	2	2	11	8	+3	14	Advance to play-offs via Nations League	1–1	0–0	—	2–0	1–0
4	North Macedonia	8	2	2	4	10	20	−10	8		1–1	1–1	2–3	—	2–1
5	Malta	8	0	0	8	2	20	−18	0		0–4	0–2	1–3	0–2	—

Source: UEFA
Rules for classification: Qualification tiebreakers

===== Play-off =====
Semi-finals
21 March 2024 – Zenica
Bosnia and Herzegovina	1
Ukraine	2
21 March 2024 – Budapest
Israel	1
Iceland	4

Final
26 March 2024 – Wrocław
Ukraine	2
Iceland	1

9 September UEFA Euro 2024 qualifying	Ukraine	1–1	England	Wrocław, Poland
18:00 (19:00 UTC+3)	Zinchenko 26'	Report	Walker 41'	Stadium: Stadion Wrocław; Referee: Georgi Kabakov (Bulgaria)

12 September UEFA Euro 2024 qualifying	Italy	2–1	Ukraine	Milan, Italy
20:45	Frattesi 12', 29'	Report	Yarmolenko 41'	Stadium: San Siro; Attendance: 58,386; Referee: Alejandro Hernández (Spain)

14 October UEFA Euro 2024 qualifying	Ukraine	2–0	North Macedonia	Prague, Czech Republic
15:00 (16:00 UTC+3)	Sudakov 30'; Karavayev 90+5'	Report		Stadium: Stadion Letná; Attendance: 12,939; Referee: Slavko Vinčić (Slovenia)

17 October UEFA Euro 2024 qualifying	Malta	1–3	Ukraine	Ta' Qali, Malta
20:45	Mbong 12'	Report	Camenzuli 38' (o.g.); Dovbyk 43' (pen.); Mudryk 85'	Stadium: National Stadium; Attendance: 3,547; Referee: Morten Krogh (Denmark)

20 November UEFA Euro 2024 qualifying	Ukraine	0–0	Italy	Leverkusen, Germany
20:45 (21:45 UTC+2)		Report		Stadium: BayArena; Attendance: 26,403; Referee: Jesús Gil Manzano (Spain)

21 March UEFA Euro 2024 qualifying play-offs	Bosnia and Herzegovina	1–2	Ukraine	Zenica, Bosnia and Herzegovina
20:45	Matviyenko 56' (o.g.)	Report	Yaremchuk 85'; Dovbyk 88'	Stadium: Bilino Polje; Attendance: 10,992; Referee: Felix Zwayer (Germany)

26 March UEFA Euro 2024 qualifying play-offs	Ukraine	2–1	Iceland	Wrocław, Poland
20:45	Tsyhankov 54'; Mudryk 84'	Report	A. Guðmundsson 30'	Stadium: Stadion Wrocław; Attendance: 29,310; Referee: Clément Turpin (France)

==== UEFA Euro 2024 ====
===== Group E =====
Pos	Team	Pld	W	D	L	GF	GA	GD	Pts	Qualification
1	Romania	3	1	1	1	4	3	+1	4	Advance to knockout stage
2	Belgium	3	1	1	1	2	1	+1	4	Advance to knockout stage
3	Slovakia	3	1	1	1	3	3	0	4	Advance to knockout stage
4	Ukraine	3	1	1	1	2	4	−2	4	

Source: UEFA

17 June 2024 UEFA Euro 2024, Group stage	Romania	3–0	Ukraine	Munich, Germany
15:00	Stanciu 29'; R. Marin 53'; Drăguș 57'	Report		Stadium: Allianz Arena; Attendance: 61,591; Referee: Glenn Nyberg (Sweden)

21 June 2024 UEFA Euro 2024, Group stage	Slovakia	1–2	Ukraine	Düsseldorf, Germany
15:00	Schranz 17'	Report	Shaparenko 54'; Yaremchuk 80'	Stadium: Merkur Spiel-Arena; Attendance: 43,910; Referee: Michael Oliver (England)

26 June 2024 UEFA Euro 2024, Group stage	Ukraine	0–0	Belgium	Stuttgart, Germany
18:00		Report		Stadium: MHPArena; Attendance: 54,000; Referee: Anthony Taylor (England)

==== Friendlies ====
===== Results and fixtures =====
16 November Unofficial friendly	Lechia Gdańsk (Poland)	0–2	Ukraine	Gdańsk, Poland
16:00 CEST (UTC+2)			Pikhalyonok 24'; Nazaryna 58'	Stadium: Polsat Plus Arena Gdańsk

3 June Friendly	Germany	v	Ukraine	Nuremberg, Germany
				Stadium: Max-Morlock-Stadion

7 June Friendly	Poland	v	Ukraine	Warsaw, Poland
				Stadium: Stadion Narodowy

11 June Friendly	Moldova	v	Ukraine	Chișinău, Moldova
				Stadium: Zimbru Stadium

=== Ukraine Olympic football team ===
==== 2024 Summer Olympics ====
===== Group B =====
Pos	Team	Pld	W	D	L	GF	GA	GD	Pts	Qualification
1	Morocco	3	2	0	1	6	3	+3	6 (Note: Head-to-head points: Morocco 3, Argentina 0.)	Advance to knockout stage
2	Argentina	3	2	0	1	6	3	+3	6	Advance to knockout stage
3	Ukraine	3	1	0	2	3	5	−2	3	
4	Iraq	3	1	0	2	3	7	−4	3	

Source: FIFA
Rules for classification: Group stage tiebreakers
Notes:
24 July 2024
19:00

Iraq	2–1	Ukraine
Aymen Hussein 57' (pen.); Ali Jasim 75'	Report	Rubchynskyi 53'

Stade de Lyon, Décines-Charpieu
Attendance: 10,637
Referee: Mahmood Ali Ismail (Sudan)
27 July 2024
17:00

Ukraine	2–1	Morocco
Kryskiv 22'; Krasnopir 90+8'	Report	Rahimi 64' (pen.)

Stade Geoffroy-Guichard, Saint-Étienne
Attendance: 28,655
Referee: Saíd Martínez (Honduras)
30 July 2024
17:00

Ukraine	0–2	Argentina
	Report	Almada 47'; Echeverri 90+1'

Stade de Lyon, Décines-Charpieu
Attendance: 10,017
Referee: Dahane Beida (Mauritania)

==== Friendlies ====
===== Results and fixtures =====
25 March 2024 Friendly	Japan	2–0	Ukraine	Kitakyushu, Fukuoka prefecture, Japan
19:15 UTC+9	Sato 48'; Tanaka 76'	Report		Stadium: Mikuni World Stadium Kitakyushu; Referee: Lewis Smith (England)

=== Ukraine women's national football team ===
==== UEFA Women's Nations League ====
===== Group B3 =====
Pos	Team	Pld	W	D	L	GF	GA	GD	Pts	Promotion, qualification or relegation	(Poland)	(Serbia)	(Ukraine)	(Greece)
1	Poland (P)	6	5	1	0	11	4	+7	16	Promotion to League A	—	2–1	2–1	2–0
2	Serbia	6	3	1	2	10	5	+5	10	Qualification for promotion play-offs	1–1	—	0–1	4–0
3	Ukraine (O)	6	2	0	4	5	7	−2	6	Qualification for relegation play-offs	0–1	1–2	—	1–0
4	Greece (R)	6	1	0	5	3	13	−10	3	Relegation to League C	1–3	0–2	2–1	—

Source: UEFA
(O) Play-off winners; (P) Promoted; (R) Relegated

===== Promotion matches =====
Team 1	Agg.	Team 2	1st leg	2nd leg
Bulgaria	0–7	Ukraine	0–4	0–3

===== Results and fixtures =====
22 September 2023–24 UEFA Women's Nations League Group B3	Ukraine	1–2	Serbia	Starogard Gdański (Poland)
15:00	Ovdiychuk 20'	Report	Čanković 64'; Damjanović 79'	Stadium: Stadion Miejski im. Kazimierza Deyny; Attendance: 173; Referee: Catarina Campos (Portugal)

26 September 2023–24 UEFA Women's Nations League Group B3	Poland	2–1	Ukraine	Gdynia
18:00	Pajor 22', 67'	Report	Shmatko 80'	Stadium: Stadion Miejski w Gdyni; Referee: Elvira Nurmustafina (Kazakhstan)

27 October 2023–24 UEFA Women's Nations League Group B3	Greece	2–1	Ukraine	Heraklion
10:00	Markou 36'; Spyridonidou 72'	Report	Kalinina 3'	Stadium: Theodoros Vardinogiannis Stadium; Referee: Jana Van Laere (Belgium)

31 October 2023–24 UEFA Women's Nations League Group B3	Ukraine	1–0	Greece	Heraklion, Greece
17:00	Apanashchenko 32'	Report		Stadium: Theodoros Vardinogiannis Stadium; Referee: Veronika Kovarova (Czech Republic)

1 December 2023 2023–24 UEFA Women's Nations League Group B3	Ukraine	0–1	Poland	Stalowa Wola, Poland
		Report	Achcińska 10'	Stadium: Stal Stalowa Wola Stadium; Referee: Ana Maria Terteleac (Romania)

5 December 2023 2023–24 UEFA Women's Nations League Group B3	Serbia	0–1	Ukraine	Stara Pazova, Serbia
		Report	Hiryn 55'	Stadium: Sports Center of FA of Serbia - Pitch 1 Referee: Katalin Sipos (Hungary)

23 February 2024 2023–24 UEFA Women's Nations League prom. play-offs	Bulgaria	0–4	Ukraine	Kardzhali
15:00 (16:00 EET)		Report	Kravchuk 6'; Andrukhiv 24'; Hlushchenko 82'; Kotyk 90'	Stadium: Arena Arda; Attendance: 459; Referee: Minka Vekkeli (Finland)

27 February 2024 2023–24 UEFA Women's Nations League prom. play-offs	Ukraine	3–0	Bulgaria	Antalya (Turkey) (Note: Due to the Russian invasion of Ukraine, Ukraine were required to play their home matches at neutral venues until further notice.)
14:00 (16:00 TRT)	Ovdiychuk 15'; Hlushchenko 18'; Shmatko 81'	Report		Stadium: Mardan Sports Complex; Attendance: 100; Referee: Zuzana Valentová (Slovakia)
Note: Ukraine won 7–0 on aggregate, and therefore both teams remained in their respective leagues.

==== UEFA Women's Euro 2025 qualifying ====
===== UEFA Women's Euro 2025 qualifying League B =====
Pos	Team	Pld	W	D	L	GF	GA	GD	Pts	Qualification	(Wales)	(Ukraine)	(Croatia)	(Kosovo)
1	Wales (P)	6	4	2	0	18	3	+15	14	Advance to play-offs and promotion to League A	—	1–1	4–0	2–0
2	Ukraine	6	3	2	1	11	4	+7	11	Advance to play-offs	2–2	—	2–0	2–0
3	Croatia	6	3	0	3	4	9	−5	9	Advance to play-offs	0–3	1–0	—	2–0
4	Kosovo (R)	6	0	0	6	0	17	−17	0	Relegation to League C	0–6	0–4	0–1	—

Source: UEFA
Rules for classification: Tiebreakers
(P) Promoted; (R) Relegated

===== UEFA Women's Euro 2025 qualifying fixtures and results =====
5 April 2024 UEFA Women's Euro 2025 qualifying	Ukraine	2–0	Kosovo	Antalya (Turkey) (Note: Due to the Russian invasion of Ukraine, Ukraine are required to play their home matches at neutral venues until further notice.)
17:00 (18:00 UTC+3)	Petryk 28' (pen.); Khimich 34'	Report		Stadium: Mardan Sports Complex; Attendance: 45; Referee: Karoline Wacker (Germany)

9 April 2024 UEFA Women's Euro 2025 qualifying	Croatia	1–0	Ukraine	Zaprešić
16:00	Lojna 18'	Report		Stadium: Ivan Laljak-Ivić Stadium; Attendance: 517; Referee: Zulema González (Spain)

31 May 2024 UEFA Women's Euro 2025 qualifying	Wales	v	Ukraine
		Report

4 June 2024 UEFA Women's Euro 2025 qualifying	Ukraine	v	Wales
		Report

==== Friendlies ====
===== Results and fixtures =====
7 July 2023 Friendly	Portugal	2–0	Ukraine	Estádio do Bessa
	Silva 19', 45+2'	Report		Stadium: Porto; Attendance: 20,123

== UEFA competitions ==
=== UEFA Champions League ===
==== Qualifying phase and play-off round ====
===== Second qualifying round =====
Team 1	Agg.	Team 2	1st leg	2nd leg
Dnipro-1 (Ukraine)	3–5	(Greece) Panathinaikos	1–3	2–2

- Due to the Russo-Ukrainian War, Dnipro-1 played its home match in Košice, Slovakia.

==== Group stage ====
===== Group H =====
Pos	Team	Pld	W	D	L	GF	GA	GD	Pts	Qualification	BAR	POR	SHK	ANT
1	(Spain) Barcelona	6	4	0	2	12	6	+6	12 (Note: Head-to-head points: Barcelona 6, Porto 0.)	Advance to knockout phase	—	2–1	2–1	5–0
2	(Portugal) Porto	6	4	0	2	15	8	+7	12	Advance to knockout phase	0–1	—	5–3	2–0
3	(Ukraine) Shakhtar Donetsk	6	3	0	3	10	12	−2	9	Transfer to Europa League	1–0	1–3	—	1–0
4	(Belgium) Antwerp	6	1	0	5	6	17	−11	3		3–2	1–4	2–3	—

Source: UEFA
Notes:
- Due to the Russo-Ukrainian War, Shakhtar Donetsk played its home matches in Hamburg, Germany.

=== UEFA Europa League ===
==== Qualifying phase and play-off round ====
===== Third qualifying round =====
Team 1	Agg.	Team 2	1st leg	2nd leg
Slavia Prague (Czech Republic)	4–1	(Ukraine) Dnipro-1	3–0	1–1

- Due to the Russo-Ukrainian War, Dnipro-1 played its home match in Košice, Slovakia.

===== Play-off round =====
Team 1	Agg.	Team 2	1st leg	2nd leg
Slavia Prague (Czech Republic)	3 – 2	(Ukraine) Zorya Luhansk	2–0	1–2

- Due to the Russo-Ukrainian War, Dnipro-1 played its home match in Lublin, Poland.

==== Knockout phase ====
===== Knockout round play-offs =====
Team 1	Agg.	Team 2	1st leg	2nd leg
Shakhtar Donetsk (Ukraine)	3–5	(France) Marseille	2–2	1–3

=== UEFA Europe Conference League ===
==== Qualifying phase and play-off round ====
===== Second qualifying round =====
Team 1	Agg.	Team 2	1st leg	2nd leg
Vorskla Poltava (Ukraine)	2–3	(Georgia (country)) Dila Gori	2–1	1–3

- Due to the Russo-Ukrainian War, Vorskla Poltava played its home match in Tychy, Poland.

===== Third qualifying round =====
Team 1	Agg.	Team 2	1st leg	2nd leg
Aris (Greece)	2–2 (5–6 p)	(Ukraine) Dynamo Kyiv	1–0	1–2 (a.e.t.)

- Due to the Russo-Ukrainian War, Dynamo Kyiv played its home match in Bucharest, Romania.

===== Play-off round =====
Team 1	Agg.	Team 2	1st leg	2nd leg
Spartak Trnava (Slovakia)	3–2	(Ukraine) Dnipro-1	1–1	2–1 (a.e.t.)
Dynamo Kyiv (Ukraine)	2–4	(Turkey) Beşiktaş	2–3	0–1

- Due to the Russo-Ukrainian War, Dnipro-1 played its home match in Košice, Slovakia.
- Due to the Russo-Ukrainian War, Dynamo Kyiv played its home match in Bucharest, Romania.

==== Group stage ====
===== Group B =====
Pos	Team	Pld	W	D	L	GF	GA	GD	Pts	Qualification	MTA	GNT	ZOR	BRE
1	(Israel) Maccabi Tel Aviv	6	5	0	1	14	9	+5	15	Advance to round of 16	—	3–1	3–2	3–2
2	(Belgium) Gent	6	4	1	1	16	7	+9	13	Advance to knockout round play-offs	2–0	—	4–1	5–0
3	(Ukraine) Zorya Luhansk	6	2	1	3	10	11	−1	7		1–3	1–1	—	4–0
4	(Iceland) Breiðablik	6	0	0	6	5	18	−13	0		1–2	2–3	0–1	—

Source: UEFA

=== UEFA Women's Champions League ===
==== Qualifying round ====
===== Round 1 =====
Semi-finals

Team 1	Score	Team 2
Vorskla Poltava (Ukraine)	4–3 (a.e.t.)	(Estonia) Flora
Paris FC (France)	4–0	(Ukraine) Kryvbas Kryvyi Rih

Final

Team 1	Score	Team 2
Vorskla Poltava (Ukraine)	3–0	(Croatia) Osijek

Third place

Team 1	Score	Team 2
Linköping (Sweden)	3–0	(Ukraine) Kryvbas Kryvyi Rih

===== Round 2 =====
Champions Path
Team 1	Agg.	Team 2	1st leg	2nd leg
Roma (Italy)	9–1	(Ukraine) Vorskla Poltava	3–0	6–1

== Men's club football ==
Due to emergency situation in the country in general, the PFL of Ukraine made some changes to its competitions and league pyramid changing the second tier to multi-group competition and the third tier to single group competition.

League		Promoted to league	Relegated from league
Premier League		Polissia Zhytomyr; Obolon Kyiv; LNZ Cherkasy	Inhulets Petrove; Metalist Kharkiv; ~~FC Lviv~~ (-)
PFL League 1	Groups		
PFL League 1	A	Podillya Khmelnytskyi (+); Ahrobiznes Volochysk (+); Nyva Buzova; Khust	~~Skoruk Tomakivka~~ (-)
PFL League 1	B	Viktoriya Sumy (+); Livyi Bereh Kyiv (+)	~~Skoruk Tomakivka~~ (-)
PFL League 2		Trostianets (+); Druzhba Myrivka; Skala 1911 Stryi; Lokomotyv Kyiv; Kudrivka; UCSA Tarasivka; Karpaty-2 Lviv; Rukh-2 Lviv	~~Rubikon Kyiv~~

Note: For all scratched clubs, see section Clubs removed for more details. (+) marked those clubs that were reinstated after missing 2022–23 season due to war, (-) marked those clubs that were excused from competing in the 2023–24 season and keep their opportunity to be reinstated next season. Number of clubs that missed the past 2022–23 season were excused from competing in the 2023–24 season, see section Clubs removed for more details.

=== Premier League ===
Pos	Team	Pld	W	D	L	GF	GA	GD	Pts	Qualification or relegation
1	Shakhtar Donetsk (C)	30	22	5	3	63	24	+39	71	Qualification for the Champions League league stage (Note: Since already qualified Real Madrid won the Champions League, Shakhtar Donetsk was promoted to the Champions League league phase as the champion with the highest coefficient in Champions League qualifying.)
2	Dynamo Kyiv	30	22	3	5	72	28	+44	69	Qualification for the Champions League second qualifying round
3	Kryvbas Kryvyi Rih	30	17	6	7	51	30	+21	57	Qualification for the Europa League third qualifying round (Note: Since the 2023–24 Ukrainian Cup winners (Shakhtar Donetsk) finished in the top two, the Europa League spot was passed to the third-placed team, and the second Conference League second qualifying round spot was passed to the fifth-placed team.)
4	Dnipro-1 (D)	30	14	10	6	40	27	+13	52	Withdrew after the season (Note: SC Dnipro-1 that withdrew from all tournaments of the 2024–25 season due to financial hardship after finishing 4th in the league qualified for the Conference League second qualifying round, however it was awarded technical losses in both matches (0:3).)
5	Polissya Zhytomyr	30	14	8	8	39	30	+9	50	Qualification for the Conference League second qualifying round
6	Rukh Lviv	30	12	13	5	44	31	+13	49	
7	LNZ Cherkasy	30	11	8	11	31	34	−3	41	
8	Oleksandriya	30	8	10	12	30	38	−8	34	
9	Vorskla Poltava	30	9	6	15	30	46	−16	33	
10	Zorya Luhansk	30	7	11	12	29	37	−8	32 (Note: Zorya Luhansk finished ahead of Kolos Kovalivka and Chornomorets Odesa on head-to-head points: Zorya Luhansk 7, Kolos Kovalivka 6, Chornomorets Odesa 4)	
11	Kolos Kovalivka	30	7	11	12	22	31	−9	32	
12	Chornomorets Odesa	30	10	2	18	38	47	−9	32	
13	Veres Rivne (O)	30	6	10	14	31	46	−15	28	Qualification for the Relegation play-off
14	Obolon Kyiv (O)	30	5	11	14	18	41	−23	26	Qualification for the Relegation play-off
15	Mynai (R)	30	5	10	15	27	50	−23	25	Qualification for the mini tournament
16	Metalist 1925 Kharkiv (R)	30	5	8	17	32	57	−25	23	Qualification for the mini tournament

Source: upl.ua
Rules for classification: 1) Points; 2) Head-to-head points; 3) Head-to-head goal difference; 4) Head-to-head goals scored; 5) Goal difference; 6) Goals scored; 7) Draw or "Golden match" if two teams tied for title (Article 22, paragraph 3).
(C) Champions; (D) Disqualified; (O) Play-off winners; (R) Relegated

=== PFL League 1 (First League) ===
==== Group A ====
Pos	Team	Pld	W	D	L	GF	GA	GD	Pts	Promotion, qualification or relegation
1	Karpaty Lviv	18	14	3	1	34	10	+24	45	Qualified to the Promotion group
2	Epitsentr Kamianets-Podilskyi	18	8	7	3	27	21	+6	31	Qualified to the Promotion group
3	Ahrobiznes Volochysk	18	8	5	5	20	15	+5	29	Qualified to the Promotion group
4	Nyva Buzova	18	7	6	5	21	19	+2	27	Qualified to the Promotion group
5	Prykarpattia Ivano-Frankivsk	18	6	8	4	27	18	+9	26	Qualified to the Promotion group
6	Bukovyna Chernivtsi	18	6	3	9	16	23	−7	21	Qualified to the Relegation group
7	Podillia Khmelnytskyi	18	4	8	6	18	17	+1	20 (Note: Head-to-head points: Podillia 4, Nyva T. 1)	Qualified to the Relegation group
8	Nyva Ternopil	18	5	5	8	15	19	−4	20	Qualified to the Relegation group
9	Metalist Kharkiv	18	3	5	10	13	27	−14	14	Qualified to the Relegation group
10	Khust	18	3	2	13	15	37	−22	11	Qualified to the Relegation group

Source: PFL.ua
Rules for classification: 1) Points; 2) Head-to-head points; 3) Head-to-head goal difference; 4) Head-to-head goals scored; 5) Goal difference in all games; 6) Goals scored in all games (Note: calculation by criteria indicated in rules 2, 3, 4 is conducted with consideration of all teams that have an equal number of tournament points at the moment of calculation and not only among those which after preliminary criteria have appeared more successful).

==== Group B ====
Pos	Team	Pld	W	D	L	GF	GA	GD	Pts	Promotion, qualification or relegation
1	Inhulets Petrove	18	13	3	2	41	13	+28	42	Qualified to the Promotion group
2	Livyi Bereh Kyiv	18	11	3	4	40	11	+29	36	Qualified to the Promotion group
3	Mariupol	18	8	7	3	22	14	+8	31	Qualified to the Promotion group
4	Viktoriya Sumy	18	8	6	4	19	18	+1	30	Qualified to the Promotion group
5	Poltava	18	8	5	5	35	27	+8	29	Qualified to the Promotion group
6	Metalurh Zaporizhzhia	18	6	7	5	23	18	+5	25	Qualified to the Relegation group
7	Hirnyk-Sport Horishni Plavni	18	5	2	11	16	32	−16	17	Qualified to the Relegation group
8	Kremin Kremenchuk	18	4	2	12	14	40	−26	14	Qualified to the Relegation group
9	Chernihiv-ShVSM	18	4	1	13	20	44	−24	13 (Note: Head-to-head points: Chernihiv 6, Dinaz 0)	Qualified to the Relegation group
10	Dinaz Vyshhorod	18	3	4	11	15	28	−13	13	Qualified to the Relegation group

Source: PFL.ua
Rules for classification: 1) Points; 2) Head-to-head points; 3) Head-to-head goal difference; 4) Head-to-head goals scored; 5) Goal difference in all games; 6) Goals scored in all games (Note: calculation by criteria indicated in rules 2, 3, 4 is conducted with consideration of all teams that have an equal number of tournament points at the moment of calculation and not only among those which after preliminary criteria have appeared more successful).

==== Promotion group ====
Pos	Team	Pld	W	D	L	GF	GA	GD	Pts	Promotion, qualification or relegation
1	Inhulets Petrove (C, P)	28	21	4	3	60	17	+43	67	Promotion to Ukrainian Premier League
2	Karpaty Lviv (P)	28	20	5	3	49	20	+29	65	Promotion to Ukrainian Premier League
3	Livyi Bereh Kyiv (O, P)	28	16	6	6	59	21	+38	54	Qualification to promotion play-offs Qualification to mini tournament
4	Epitsentr Kamianets-Podilskyi	28	11	11	6	39	33	+6	44	Qualification to promotion play-offs Qualification to mini tournament
5	Prykarpattia Ivano-Frankivsk	28	10	10	8	35	30	+5	40 (Note: Head-to-head results: Nyva–Prykarpattia 0:1, Prykarpattia–Nyva 2:2)	
6	Kudrivka-Nyva	28	10	10	8	32	34	−2	40	merged with FC Kudrivka
7	Viktoriya Sumy	28	10	9	9	23	27	−4	39	
8	Ahrobiznes Volochysk	28	10	8	10	27	29	−2	38	
9	Mariupol	28	8	13	7	29	26	+3	37 (Note: Head-to-head results: Mariupol–Poltava 1:1, Poltava–Mariupol 0:2)	
10	Poltava	28	10	7	11	49	45	+4	37	

Source: PFL.ua
Rules for classification: 1) Points; 2) Head-to-head points; 3) Head-to-head goal difference; 4) Head-to-head goals scored; 5) Goal difference in all games; 6) Goals scored in all games (Note: calculation by criteria indicated in rules 2, 3, 4 is conducted with consideration of all teams that have an equal number of tournament points at the moment of calculation and not only among those which after preliminary criteria have appeared more successful).
(C) Champions; (O) Play-off winners; (P) Promoted

==== Relegation group ====
Pos	Team	Pld	W	D	L	GF	GA	GD	Pts	Promotion, qualification or relegation
11	Bukovyna Chernivtsi	28	12	5	11	38	29	+9	41	
12	Podillia Khmelnytskyi	28	9	12	7	36	26	+10	39	
13	Nyva Ternopil	28	9	9	10	29	29	0	36	
14	Metalist Kharkiv	28	7	9	12	27	34	−7	30 (Note: Head-to-head points: Metalist 4, Dinaz 1)	
15	Dinaz Vyshhorod	28	8	6	14	31	38	−7	30	
16	Khust	28	9	2	17	34	53	−19	29	Qualification to relegation play-off (both later avoided relegation)
17	Metalurh Zaporizhzhia	28	7	7	14	27	48	−21	28	Qualification to relegation play-off (both later avoided relegation)
18	Kremin Kremenchuk	28	6	7	15	20	48	−28	25	Avoided relegation
19	Chernihiv-ShVSM (R)	28	6	5	17	34	66	−32	23 (Note: Head-to-head points: Chernihiv 6, Hirnyk-Sport 0)	Relegation to Ukrainian Second League
20	Hirnyk-Sport Horishni Plavni (R)	28	6	5	17	24	49	−25	23	Relegation to Ukrainian Second League

Source: PFL.ua
Rules for classification: 1) Points; 2) Head-to-head points; 3) Head-to-head goal difference; 4) Head-to-head goals scored; 5) Goal difference in all games; 6) Goals scored in all games (Note: calculation by criteria indicated in rules 2, 3, 4 is conducted with consideration of all teams that have an equal number of tournament points at the moment of calculation and not only among those which after preliminary criteria have appeared more successful).
(R) Relegated

==== Relegation play-offs ====
Team 1	Agg.	Team 2	1st leg	2nd leg
FC Khust	1 – 2	PFC Zviahel	1–1	0–1
UCSA Tarasivka	7 – 1	Metalurh Zaporizhzhia	3–1	4–0

=== First leg ===
1 June 2024
12:00

FC Khust	1 – 1	PFC Zviahel
Stankovych 55'	Report	Fesenko 76'

Karpaty, Khust
Attendance: 0
Referee: Lyudmyla Telbukh
1 June 2024
13:30

UCSA Tarasivka	3 – 1	Metalurh Zaporizhzhia
Makhniev 27' (pen.); Goulart 83'; Guerreiro 90+4'	Report	Humenyak 29'

Bannikov Stadium, Kyiv
Attendance: 150
Referee: Dmytro Osaulenko

=== Second leg ===
8 June 2024
13:00

PFC Zviahel	1 – 0	FC Khust
Tomandzoto 66'	Report	Byelimenko (yellow card) 65' (yellow-red card) 90+6'

Avanhard, Zviahel
Attendance: 1,200
Referee: Ihor Stashuk

Zviahel won 2–1 on aggregate and was promoted to the 2024–25 Ukrainian First League. Khust was relegated to the 2024–25 Ukrainian Second League. Due to withdrawal of Druzhba Myrivka, Khust was reinstated.

8 June 2024
12:00

Metalurh Zaporizhzhia	0 – 4	UCSA Tarasivka
Kostyuchenko (yellow card) 31' (yellow-red card) 52'; Baranyuk (yellow card) 49' (yellow-red card) 88'	Report	Eseola 9'; Guerreiro 62'; Khovayko 86'; Yevdokymov 90+3'

Slavutych-Arena, Zaporizhzhia
Attendance: 0
Referee: Andriy Zaitsev

UCSA Tarasivka won 7–1 on aggregate and was promoted to the 2024–25 Ukrainian First League. Metalurh Zaporizhzhia was relegated to the 2024–25 Ukrainian Second League. Due to withdrawal of Dnipro-1, Metalurh was reinstated.

=== PFL League 2 (Second League) ===
Pos	Team	Pld	W	D	L	GF	GA	GD	Pts	Promotion, qualification or relegation
1	Druzhba Myrivka (C)	26	19	5	2	50	13	+37	62 (Note: Head-to-head results: Druzhba – UCSA 2:1, UCSA – Druzhba 0:1)	Promotion to Ukrainian First League; Withdrawn after the season
2	UCSA Tarasivka (O, P)	26	19	5	2	62	13	+49	62	Qualification to promotional play-off
3	Zviahel (O)	26	19	4	3	63	17	+46	61	Promotion to Ukrainian First League; Withdrawn after the season
4	Chaika Petropavlivska Borshchahivka	26	15	6	5	43	18	+25	51	
5	Karpaty-2 Lviv	26	11	6	9	35	39	−4	39	Withdrawn after the season
6	Skala 1911 Stryi	26	12	2	12	32	33	−1	38	
7	Kudrivka	26	10	7	9	33	40	−7	37	Promotion to Ukrainian First League through merger
8	Nyva Vinnytsia	26	9	9	8	36	35	+1	36	
9	Rukh-2 Lviv	26	9	7	10	29	36	−7	34	
10	Lokomotyv Kyiv	26	7	7	12	34	43	−9	28	
11	Trostianets	26	5	6	15	23	37	−14	21	
12	Real Pharma Odesa	26	5	4	17	17	51	−34	19	
13	Metalurh-2 Zaporizhzhia	26	5	1	20	17	44	−27	16	Withdrawn during winter break
14	Kremin-2 Kremenchuk	26	1	3	22	11	66	−55	6	Withdrawn after the season
-	Vast Mykolaiv	0	0	0	0	0	0	0	0	Withdrawn and record annulled

Source: PFL.ua
Rules for classification: 1) Points; 2) Head-to-head points; 3) Head-to-head goal difference; 4) Head-to-head goals scored; 5) Goal difference in all games; 6) Goals scored in all games (Note: calculation by criteria indicated in rules 2, 3, 4 is conducted with consideration of all teams that have equal number of tournament points at the moment of calculation and not only among those which after preliminary criteria have appeared more successful).
(C) Champions; (O) Play-off winners; (P) Promoted

=== Cup competitions ===
==== Ukrainian Cup ====
15 May 2024
19:00

Vorskla Poltava (PL)	1–2	(PL) Shakhtar Donetsk
Kovtalyuk 85'	Report (ua); Report (en)	Sikan 40'; Konoplya 55'

Avanhard, Rivne
Attendance: 3,500
Referee: Vitaliy Romanov (Dnipro)

== Women's club football ==
Promoted	Relegated
Zhytlobud-1 Kharkiv (+)	Ateks Kyiv

Note: For the scratched clubs, see section Clubs removed for more details

=== Vyshcha Liha ===
Pos	Team	Pld	W	D	L	GF	GA	GD	Pts	Qualification or relegation
1	Kryvbas Kryvyi Rih	11	10	1	0	36	6	+30	31	Qualification for the Championship Group
2	Vorskla Poltava	11	9	1	1	63	3	+60	28	Qualification for the Championship Group
3	Kolos Kovalivka	11	8	1	2	31	8	+23	25	Qualification for the Championship Group
4	Zhytlobud-1 Kharkiv	11	6	2	3	21	16	+5	20	Qualification for the Championship Group
5	Shakhtar Donetsk	11	6	1	4	32	13	+19	19	Qualification for the Championship Group
6	Ladomyr Volodymyr	11	5	3	3	22	21	+1	18	Qualification for the Championship Group
7	Dnipro-1	11	4	1	6	18	24	−6	13	Qualification for the Relegation Group
8	Dynamo Kyiv	11	3	3	5	12	24	−12	12	Qualification for the Relegation Group
9	EMS Podillia Vinnytsia	11	3	2	6	15	38	−23	11	Qualification for the Relegation Group
10	Veres Rivne	11	2	0	9	17	38	−21	6	Qualification for the Relegation Group
11	Pantery Uman	11	1	1	9	13	42	−29	4	Qualification for the Relegation Group
12	Mariupol	11	0	2	9	5	52	−47	2	Qualification for the Relegation Group

Source: womensfootball.com.ua
Rules for classification: 1) Points; 2) Head-to-head points; 3) Head-to-head goal difference; 4) Head-to-head goals scored; 5) Goal difference; 6) Goals scored.

Pos	Team	Pld	W	D	L	GF	GA	GD	Pts	
1	Vorskla Poltava (C)	21	17	3	1	94	5	+89	54	Qualification for Champions League second round
2	Kolos Kovalivka	21	13	4	4	41	18	+23	43	Qualification for Champions League first round
3	Kryvbas Kryvyi Rih	21	13	2	6	49	29	+20	41 (Note: Head-to-head results: Kryvbas – Zhytlobud-1 4:1, Kryvbas – Metalist 1925 2:2, Metalist 1925 – Kryvbas 3:1)	
4	Metalist 1925 Kharkiv	21	12	5	4	42	21	+21	41	
5	Shakhtar Donetsk	21	8	2	11	38	28	+10	26	
6	Ladomyr Volodymyr	21	6	3	12	30	55	−25	21	

Source: womensfootball.com.ua
Rules for classification: 1) Points; 2) Head-to-head points; 3) Head-to-head goal difference; 4) Head-to-head goals scored; 5) Goal difference; 6) Goals scored.
(C) Champions
Notes:

Pos	Team	Pld	W	D	L	GF	GA	GD	Pts	
7	Dnipro-1	21	11	3	7	44	32	+12	36	Withdrew after the season
8	Dynamo Kyiv	21	10	4	7	41	33	+8	34	Withdrew after the season
9	EMS-Podillia Vinnytsia	21	9	4	8	30	52	−22	31	
10	Pantery Uman (O)	21	5	2	14	34	57	−23	17	Qualification to relegation play-offs
11	Veres Rivne (R)	21	2	3	16	21	61	−40	9	Qualification to relegation play-offs
12	Mariupol (R)	21	1	3	17	10	83	−73	6	Relegation to Persha Liha

Source: womensfootball.com.ua
Rules for classification: 1) Points; 2) Head-to-head points; 3) Head-to-head goal difference; 4) Head-to-head goals scored; 5) Goal difference; 6) Goals scored.
(O) Play-off winners; (R) Relegated

Team 1	Agg.	Team 2	1st leg	2nd leg
First leg – June 1, Second leg – June 6
Pantery Uman	7 – 0	FC Mynai	3–0	4–0
Veres Rivne	2 – 3	Obolon Kyiv	1–1	1–2 (a.e.t.)

1 June 2024
16:00

Pantery Uman	3–0	FC Mynai
Myrhorodska 4'; Rybalkina 19'; Santos 52'	Report

Tsentralnyi, Uman
Referee: Nataliya Mamchur
6 June 2024
13:00

FC Mynai	0–4	Pantery Uman
	Report	Santos 21'; Tykhonova 31'; Roshka 33'; Bilokur 88' (pen.)

Mynai Arena, Mynai, Zakarpattia Oblast
Referee: Anastasia Romaniuk

1 June 2024
12:00

Veres Rivne	1–1	Obolon Kyiv
Lyakhovych 29'	Report	Vasylyuk 5'

Veres training base, Rivne
Referee: Anastasiya Romanyuk
6 June 2024
18:00

Obolon Kyiv	2–1 (a.e.t.)	Veres Rivne
Skiriak 56'; Kvach 102'	Report	Zabytivska 37'

Obolon Arena, Kyiv
Referee: Veronika Vasylchenko

== Managerial changes ==
This is a list of managerial changes among Ukrainian professional football clubs:

Team	Outgoing manager	Manner of departure	Date of vacancy	Table	Incoming manager	Date of appointment
				Pre-season		

== Clubs removed ==
=== Professional status kept ===
Not competing this season

First League

- Lviv
- Skoruk Tomakivka
- Uzhhorod
- Kramatorsk
- VPK-Ahro Shevchenkivka

Second League

- AFSC Kyiv
- Balkany Zorya
- Karpaty Halych
- Mykolaiv
- Sumy
- Munkach Mukachevo
- Lyubomyr Stavyshche
- Krystal Kherson
- Enerhiya Nova Kakhovka
- Tavriya Simferopol

=== Permanently ===
- Rubikon Kyiv was excluded from the Professional Football League of Ukraine (PFL) on decision of the Ukrainian Association of Football (UAF) Control and Disciplinary Commission (CDC) on 11 May 2023 and the PFL Central Council.

On 21 June 2023 the 31st PFL Conference excluded following clubs that did not compete last season but were keeping their membership.

- Nikopol
- Volyn Lutsk
- Olimpik Donetsk
- Dnipro Cherkasy
- Vovchansk
