= Maksym Tatarenko =

Ukrainian footballer (born 1999)

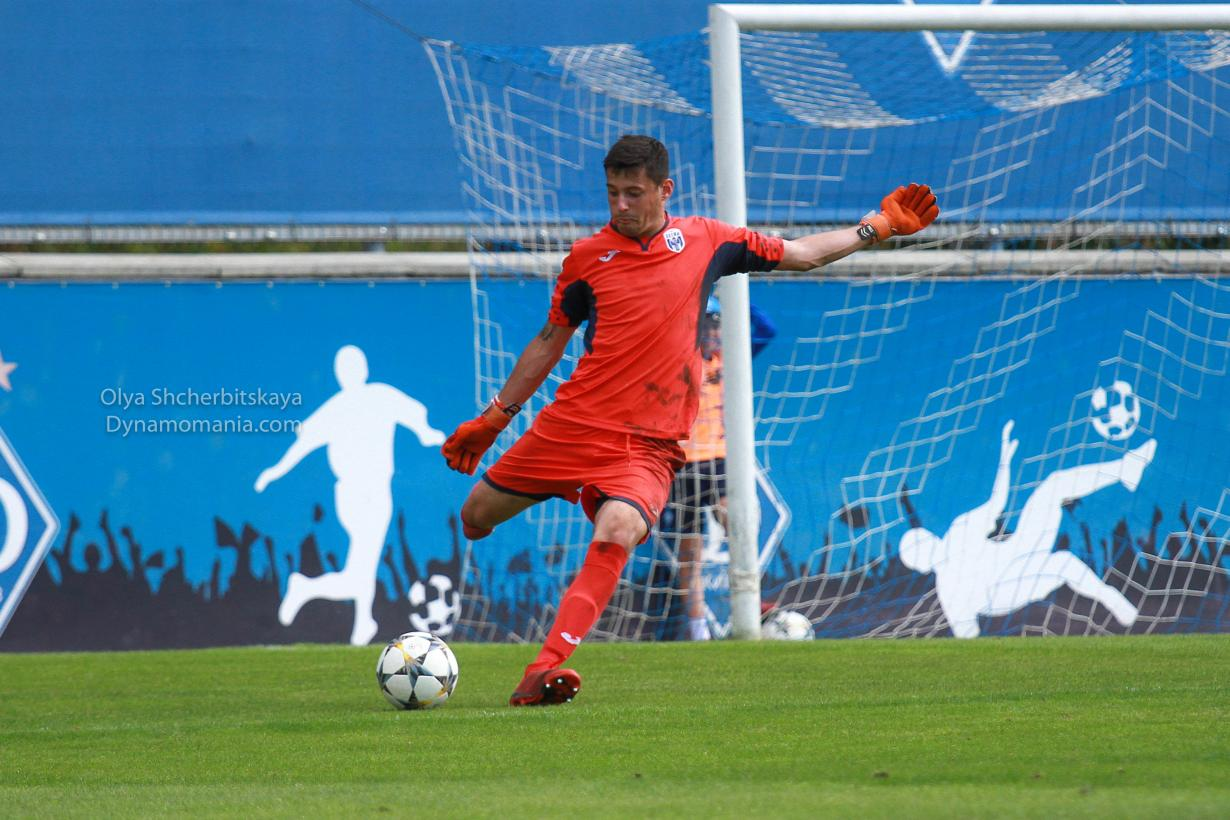
- Tatarenko with Desna-2 Chernihiv

Personal information
- Full name: Maksym Mykolayovych Tatarenko
- Date of birth: 7 May 1999 (age 27)
- Place of birth: Chernihiv, Ukraine
- Height: 1.80 m (5 ft 11 in)
- Position: Goalkeeper

Team information
- Current team: Chernihiv
- Number: 35

Youth career
- 2016: Yunist Chernihiv
- 2016–2016: Polissya Dobryanka
- 2018–2020: Desna Chernihiv

Senior career*
Years	Team	Apps	(Gls)
2019–2020	Desna Chernihiv	0	(0)
2020–2022	Kudrivka	10	(0)
2022–2024	Druzhba Myrivka	54	(0)
2024–	Chernihiv	61	(0)
- * Club domestic league appearances and goals as of 21 November 2026

Maksym Mykolayovych Tatarenko (Ukrainian: Максим Миколайович Татаренко; born 29 January 1999) is a Ukrainian professional footballer who plays as a goalkeeper for Chernihiv.

== Club career ==
=== Early career ===
He is a product of the Yunist Chernihiv where he started his football career, before moving to Desna-2 Chernihiv. In 2019 Tatarenko was listed as a third goalie of Desna Chernihiv, but he did not get much of playtime partially due to his young age.

=== Kudrivka ===
After a season he moved to Kudrivka where in 2020 won the Kyiv Oblast Football Federation and in 2011 the Kyiv Oblast Football Cup and Chernihiv Oblast Football Cup and the Chernihiv Oblast Super Cup.

=== Druzhba Myrivka ===
In January 2023 he signed for Druzhba Myrivka, where he won the Ukrainian Amateur Cup and the 2023–24 Ukrainian Second League.

=== FC Chernihiv ===
On 21 June 2024, he joined to Chernihiv in Ukrainian Second League. He soon surpassed Oleksandr Shyray as the club's starting goalkeeper. he made his debut in the 2024–25 Ukrainian Cup against Chaika. On 12 August, he saved a penalty by Serhiy Mashtalir against Viktoriya Sumy in Ukrainian Cup.

In September, he was elected player of the month in Ukrainian Second League. By 26 May 2025, Maksym had kept 291 minutes of clean sheets since the start of the season, which was a single-season record for the league. Tatarenko imposed himself as the best goalkeeper Ukrainian Second League, finishing the 18 matches-long season conceding only 8 goals, helping FC Chernihiv obtain Ukrainian First League promotion during the 2024–25 Ukrainian Second League.

On 26 June 2025, even if few clubs in Ukrainia Premier League were interested, he decided to extend his contract with the club. He made his Ukrainian First League debut with FC Chernihiv on 3 August 2025, in a 1–0 away lost with Probiy Horodenka. On 17 August, during the match against Prykarpattia Ivano-Frankivsk, he kepts a clean sheet for the first time in the Ukrainian First League.

Tatarenko played FC Chernihiv's matches in the Ukrainian Cup, impressing enough helping the club to qualify for the round of 16 for the first time. Due to his performance in the match against Vorskla Poltava, he was included in the Best XI of Round 10 of the 2025–26 Ukrainian First League. On 2 July, 2026, he signed a new three-year contract with the club.

== Career statistics ==
=== Club ===
As of match played 21 November 2026

Appearances and goals by club, season and competition
Club	Season	League			Cup		Europe		Other		Total	
Club	Season	Division	Apps	Goals	Apps	Goals	Apps	Goals	Apps	Goals	Apps	Goals
Desna Chernihiv	2019–20	Ukrainian Premier League	0	0	0	0	0	0	0	0	0	0
Kudrivka	2020–21	Ukrainian Amateur League	5	0	0	0	0	0	0	0	5	0
Kudrivka	2021–22	Ukrainian Amateur League	5	0	0	0	0	0	0	0	5	0
Druzhba Myrivka	2022–23	Ukrainian Amateur League	28	0	0	0	0	0	0	0	28	0
Druzhba Myrivka	2023–24	Ukrainian Second League	26	0	1	0	0	0	0	0	27	0
Chernihiv	2024–25	Ukrainian Second League	18	0	2	0	0	0	4	0	24	0
Chernihiv	2025–26	Ukrainian First League	30	0	6	0	0	0	0	0	36	0
Chernihiv	2026–27	Ukrainian First League	13	0	2	0	0	0	0	0	15	0
Career total			125	0	11	0	0	0	4	0	139	0

== Honours ==
Druzhba Myrivka

- Ukrainian Second League: 2023–24
- Ukrainian Football Amateur League: 2022–23
- Ukrainian Amateur Cup: 2022–23
- Kyiv Oblast Football Championship: 2022–23

Kudrivka

- Chernihiv Oblast Football Cup: 2021
- Kyiv Oblast Football Federation: 2020
- Kyiv Oblast Football Cup: 2021

Chernihiv

- Ukrainian Cup runner-up: 2025–26
- Ukrainian Second League runner-up: 2024–25 (Group B)

Individual

- Best Goalkeeper of Ukrainian Second Leagueː 2024–25 (13 clean sheets)
- FC Chernihiv Player of the Year: (2) 2025 2026
- SportArena Player of the Round: 2025-26 (Round 10)
- Honoured Master of Sport of Ukraine
