= 2023–24 Ukrainian Second League =

Ukrainian Second League
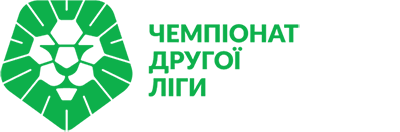
- Season: 2023–24
- Dates: 6 August 2023 – 25 May 2024 (winter break: 27 November 2023 – 22 March 2024)
- Matches: 140
- Goals: 423 (3.02 per match)
- Top goalscorer: Denys Ndukve (15 goals)
- Biggest home win: Kudrivka 9–0 Vast (11 August 2023)
- Biggest away win: Kremin-2 0–7 Zviahel (3 September 2023)
- Highest scoring: Nyva 4–7 Zviahel (6 August 2023)
- Longest winning run: Zviahel (8 matches)
- Longest unbeaten run: USCA Tarasivka (12 matches)
- Longest winless run: Kremin-2 Kremenchuk (20 matches)
- Longest losing run: Kremin-2 Kremenchuk (12 matches)
- Total attendance: 0
- Average attendance: 0
- All statistics correct as of 7 April 2024.

The 2023–24 Ukrainian Second League was the 33rd since its establishment.

== Teams ==
=== Promoted teams ===
One team of the 2021–22 Ukrainian Second League returned:

- Trostianets – (returning after a season)

Three teams have been promoted from the 2022–23 Ukrainian Football Amateur League:

- Lokomotyv Kyiv – 5th place of Group 2 (debut, last time at professional level back in 1940)
- Druzhba Myrivka – 1st place of Group 2 (debut)
- Skala 1911 Stryi – 3rd place of Group 1 (debut, a phoenix club of Morshyn that competed in 2017–18 and Hazovyk-Skala Stryi in 2003–04)

Two teams have been promoted as participants of the 2021–22 Ukrainian Football Amateur League:

- Kudrivka – 2nd place of Group 2 (debut)
- UCSA Tarasivka – 8th place of Group 2 (debut)

Two second teams have been added:

- Karpaty-2 Lviv – (returning, last competed 13 seasons ago in 2009–10)
- Rukh-2 Lviv – (debut)

=== Relegated teams ===
No teams were relegated from the 2022–23 Ukrainian First League.

=== Merged and renamed teams ===
- Vast Mykolaiv → Mykolaiv 1920, on 28 June 2023 the Vast's Instagram page appeared to announce that club changes its name to Mykolaiv 1920. The internet news website "Ukrainskyi futbol" asked for commentary from the Chairman of the Board of MFC Mykolaiv Serhiy Kantor who stated that everything must be done by the law and Vast Mykolaiv at the PFL Annual Conference was certified as Vast Mykolaiv.
- FC Kudrivka, the club merged with Nyva Buzova which is playing in the First League.

=== Expelled and withdrawn teams ===
- On 26 October 2023 Vast Mykolaiv was expelled from the 2023–24 Ukrainian Second League (Druha Liha) teams' competitions by the UAF CDC for failing to appear for a scheduled match for second time. The club played 10 matches with a record of 1 win, 1 tie, 8 losses and goal difference 8 scored, 40 allowed.
- On 5 January 2024 Metalurh Zaporizhzhia announced that it already started process of liquidation of its second team due to change of financing of the club. Upon withdrawal the Metalurh's second team was placing 10th playing 16 matches with a record of 5 wins, 1 tie, 10 losses and goal difference 17 scored 44 allowed.

=== Location map and stadiums ===
Home venues of teams in the 2023–24 Ukrainian Second League

Team	Stadium (Note: Minimum capacity of stadium for the Second League is 500 spectators.)	Position in 2022–23
Chaika	Tsentralnyi Stadion imeni Brukvenka, Makariv	3rd
Nyva Vinnytsia	Tsentralnyi Miskyi Stadion	4th
Zviahel	Stadion Avanhard	5th
Real Pharma Odesa	Stadion Ivan	6th
Vast Mykolaiv	Stadion Ivan, Odesa	7th
Metalurh-2 Zaporizhzhia	Stadion Bazys, Kochubiyivka	8th
Kremin-2 Kremenchuk	Kremin Arena	9th
Druzhba Myrivka	Stadion Druzhba, Kaharlyk	AM
Lokomotyv Kyiv	Stadion imeni Bannikova	AM
Skala 1911 Stryi	Stadion Sokil	AM
Kudrivka	Kudrivka Arena	Reg
UCSA Tarasivka	Stadion imeni Bannikova, Kyiv	Reg
Trostianets	Stadion imeni Kutsa	—
Karpaty-2 Lviv	Stadion Ukraina	—
Rukh-2 Lviv	Stadion imeni Markevycha, Vynnyky	—

== Managers ==
Club	Head coach	Replaced coach
Chaika Petropavlivska Borshchahivka	Serhiy Syzykhin	
Druzhba Myrivka	Dmytro Chyrykal	
Karpaty-2 Lviv	Roman Hnativ	
Kremin-2 Kremenchuk	Yaroslav Zdyrko	Roman Loktionov
Kudrivka	Vasyl Baranov	Serhiy Datsenko Roman Loktionov
Lokomotyv Kyiv	Vadym Lazorenko	Ruslan Umanets
~~Metalurh-2 Zaporizhzhia~~	Andriy Zubchenko	
Nyva Vinnytsia	Yuriy Yaroshenko	
Real Pharma Odesa	Andriy Parkhomenko	
Rukh-2 Lviv	Volodymyr Bezubyak	
Skala 1911 Stryi	Mykhailo Basarab	Mykola Vasylyshyn
Trostianets	Yuriy Bakalov	Valeriy Shapovalov Volodymyr Prokopynenko (caretaker)
UCSA Tarasivka	Mykola Tsymbal	
~~Vast Mykolaiv~~	Ihor Yermakov	
Zviahel	Yuriy Virt	Yuriy Maksymov Serhiy Shyshchenko Mykola Hibalyuk (caretaker)

=== Managerial changes ===
Team	Outgoing head coach	Manner of departure	Date of vacancy	Table	Incoming head coach	Date of appointment
Nyva Vinnytsia	Oleh Ostapenko	Role change	7 June 2023	Pre-season	Yuriy Yaroshenko	7 June 2023
Trostianets	Serhiy Korytnyk	Mutual concent	12 June 2023	Pre-season	Valeriy Shapovalov	15 June 2023
Zviahel	Ruslan Skydan	Role change	20 June 2023	Pre-season	Yuriy Maksymov	20 June 2023
Metalurh-2 Zaporizhzhia	Vyacheslav Tropin	End of contract	30 June 2023	Pre-season	Andriy Zubchenko	30 June 2023
Lokomotyv Kyiv	Valeriy Havrylov	Mutual concent		Pre-season	Bohdan Kondratyuk	30 June 2023
Lokomotyv Kyiv	Bohdan Kondratyuk			Pre-season	Ruslan Umanets	17 July 2023
UCSA Tarasivka	Bohdan Balan			Pre-season	Mykola Tsymbal	4 July 2023
Rukh-2 Lviv	new team			Pre-season	Ihor Duts	24 July 2023
Rukh-2 Lviv	Ihor Duts	Change of role	6 August 2023	Pre-season	Volodymyr Bezubyak	6 August 2023
Karpaty-2 Lviv	new team			Pre-season	Ihor Oshchypko	5 August 2023
Karpaty-2 Lviv	Ihor Oshchypko	Change of role	26 August 2023	Pre-season	Roman Hnativ	26 August 2023
Zviahel	Yuriy Maksymov	Signed with SC Dnipro-1	13 September 2023	4th	Serhiy Shyshchenko	13 September 2023
Lokomotyv Kyiv	Ruslan Umanets	Mutual agreement	25 September 2023	13th	Vadym Lazorenko	27 September 2023
Kremin-2 Kremenchuk	Yaroslav Zdyrko	Change of role	24 September 2023	14th	Roman Loktionov	24 September 2023
Skala Stryi	Mykola Vasylyshyn	Resigned	30 September 2023	8th	Mykhailo Basarab (caretaker)	30 September 2023
Skala Stryi	Mykhailo Basarab (caretaker)	Made a head coach	28 November 2023	5th	Mykhailo Basarab	28 September 2023
FC Kudrivka	Serhiy Datsenko	Mutual agreement	25 November 2023	6th	Roman Loktionov	27 November 2023
Kremin-2 Kremenchuk	Roman Loktionov	Mutual agreement	27 November 2023	14th	Yaroslav Zdyrko	
FC Kudrivka	Roman Loktionov	Signed with Kudrivka-Nyva	5 January 2024	6th	Vasyl Baranov	26 January 2024
Zviahel	Serhiy Shyshchenko	Signed with Polissia Zhytomyr	12 March 2024	4th	Mykola Hibalyuk (caretaker)	13 March 2024
Zviahel	Mykola Hibalyuk (caretaker)	End of interim	16 April 2024	1st	Yuriy Virt	16 April 2024
FC Trostianets	Valeriy Shapovalov	Mutual consent	25 April 2024	12th	Volodymyr Prokopynenko (caretaker)	25 April 2024
FC Trostianets	Volodymyr Prokopynenko (caretaker)	End of interim	10 May 2024	12th	Yuriy Bakalov	10 May 2024

== League table ==
Pos	Team	Pld	W	D	L	GF	GA	GD	Pts	Promotion, qualification or relegation
1	Druzhba Myrivka (C)	26	19	5	2	50	13	+37	62 (Note: Head-to-head results: Druzhba – UCSA 2:1, UCSA – Druzhba 0:1)	Promotion to Ukrainian First League; Withdrawn after the season
2	UCSA Tarasivka (O, P)	26	19	5	2	62	13	+49	62	Qualification to promotional play-off
3	Zviahel (O)	26	19	4	3	63	17	+46	61	Promotion to Ukrainian First League; Withdrawn after the season
4	Chaika Petropavlivska Borshchahivka	26	15	6	5	43	18	+25	51	
5	Karpaty-2 Lviv	26	11	6	9	35	39	−4	39	Withdrawn after the season
6	Skala 1911 Stryi	26	12	2	12	32	33	−1	38	
7	Kudrivka	26	10	7	9	33	40	−7	37	Promotion to Ukrainian First League through merger
8	Nyva Vinnytsia	26	9	9	8	36	35	+1	36	
9	Rukh-2 Lviv	26	9	7	10	29	36	−7	34	
10	Lokomotyv Kyiv	26	7	7	12	34	43	−9	28	
11	Trostianets	26	5	6	15	23	37	−14	21	
12	Real Pharma Odesa	26	5	4	17	17	51	−34	19	
13	Metalurh-2 Zaporizhzhia	26	5	1	20	17	44	−27	16	Withdrawn during winter break
14	Kremin-2 Kremenchuk	26	1	3	22	11	66	−55	6	Withdrawn after the season
-	Vast Mykolaiv	0	0	0	0	0	0	0	0	Withdrawn and record annulled

Source: PFL.ua
Rules for classification: 1) Points; 2) Head-to-head points; 3) Head-to-head goal difference; 4) Head-to-head goals scored; 5) Goal difference in all games; 6) Goals scored in all games (Note: calculation by criteria indicated in rules 2, 3, 4 is conducted with consideration of all teams that have equal number of tournament points at the moment of calculation and not only among those which after preliminary criteria have appeared more successful).
(C) Champions; (O) Play-off winners; (P) Promoted

=== Results ===
Home \ Away	CPB	DRU	KL2	KR2	KDR	LOK	MT2	NVI	RPO	RL2	SKL	TRO	UCS	VST	ZVA
Chaika P. Borshchahivka		1–0	1–3 (Note: The three of the Second League Round 17 matches on 11 November 2023 were postponed due to mass ballistic missile attack across Ukraine by the Russian Forces. The match was played the next day.)	5–0	1–1	2–0	3–0	0–0	1–0	2–1	2–0	3–0	1–3	5–1	2–2
Druzhba Myrivka	1–1		5–2	2–0	0–0	3–1	9–1	2–0	2–0	1–1	0–1	2–0	2–1	7–1	1–1
Karpaty-2	0–4	0–5		0–0	2–3	3–2	3–1	0–0	2–1	1–2	2–1	1–0	0–2		0–2
Kremin-2	0–3	0–2	0–0		0–1	0–3	1–2	0–5	1–2	1–1	0–1	1–0	0–1	1–1	0–7
Kudrivka	1–0	0–3	1–2	4–2		3–0	+/-	1–1	3–1	0–1	1–2	1–1	1–7	9–0	0–4
Lokomotyv Kyiv	1–1	2–3	1–1	3–1	0–0		0–2	2–1	5–0	0–1	2–0	2–1	0–0	2–1	0–2
Metalurh-2	-/+	-/+	-/+	2–1	1–2	1–3		0–2	-/+	-/+	3–2	1–1	0–2	3–0 (Note: The Round 14 match (October 21) did not take place. Vast Mykolaiv announced that it withdraws from competitions. On 26 October 2023 the UAF CDC adopted decision to award technical victory (3:0) to Metalurh and technical loss (0:3) to Vast after Vast failed to appear for the schedule match.)	0–5
Nyva Vinnytsia	0–1	1–1 (Note: The three of the Second League Round 17 matches on 11 November 2023 were postponed due to mass ballistic missile attack across Ukraine by the Russian Forces. The match was played the next day.)	1–4	2–0	1–0	2–1	+/-		2–0	2–1	2–2	1–1	1–3		4–7
Real Pharma	1–1	0–1	1–1	2–1	0–1	4–1	2–0	0–4		0–0	0–2	0–2	1–1	1–2	0–3
Rukh-2	0–3	0–1	0–5	2–0	2–2	2–2	8–2	1–1	1–0		2–0	0–0	0–2		1–2
Skala 1911	2–1	0–1	1–2 (Note: The match was postponed from August 20 (Round 3) to September 27 (after Round 9).)	4–0	4–3	4–1	+/-	0–0	2–1	1–2 (Note: The three of the Second League Round 17 matches on 11 November 2023 were postponed due to mass ballistic missile attack across Ukraine by the Russian Forces. The match has been scheduled to be played on 27 November 2023.)		1–0	0–1	3–0 (Note: The match did not take place at scheduled time on 27 August 2023 and reason was not disclosed. Later it became known that the game was postponed on the initiative of visiting team due to shortage of available players. No later than 6 October 2023, the PFL updated its calendar showing the match result as 3–0 (before Round 11).)	1–3
Trostianets	0–2	0–1	2–0	2–1	1–3	1–1	0–1	1–1	6–1	3–0	0–1		0–3	4–1	0–1
UCSA Tarasivka	2–1	0–1	1–1	8–1	3–0	1–1	+/-	3–1	4–0	4–0	3–0	4–0			1–1
Vast Mykolaiv								1–5		0–3					
Zviahel	0–1	0–1	2–0	2–0	1–1	4–0	+/-	4–1	4–0	1–0 (Note: Zviahel requested to have the Round 13 match Zviahel – Rukh-2 to be postponed as many players of Zviahel are out due to injuries and illnesses (URTI). On 18 October 2023 the PFL announced that the match will take place on 15 November 2023 (after Round 17).)	1–0	4–1	0–2		

Source: pfl.ua (in Ukrainian)
Legend: Blue = home team win; Yellow = draw; Red = away team win.
Notes:

Additional notes:

- The Round 4 match (Vast–Karpaty-2) did not take place on scheduled date 3 September 2023 as Vast was not able to provide playing grounds being a home team.
- The Round 12 match (UCSA–Vast) did not take place on scheduled date 11 October 2023 due to financial struggle of Vast. The match was rescheduled for 1 November 2023 (after Round 15). Later Vast director explained that the club has no issues with financing, but rather with shortage of players and working to resolve this problem.
- The Round 14 match (October 27, Zviahel–Vast) did not take place since the UAF CDC has officially announced on October 26 that Vast was removed from Ukrainian professional football competitions.

== Results by week ==
Note: due to postponement of matches, results per round in table are indicated as "per week" and not in order of the "PFL calendar".

Team ╲ Round	1	2	3	4	5	6	7	8	9	10	11	12	13	14	15	16	17	18	19	20	21	22	23	24	25	26
Chaika Petropavlivska Borshchahivka	W	W	L	D	W	W	W	L	W	L	W	W	W	W	L	L	W	+	D	D	D	W	W	D	W	D
Druzhba Myrivka	W	W	W	W	L	W	W	W	W	W	D	W	L	D	W	+	W	W	D	W	W	D	W	W	D	W
Karpaty-2 Lviv	W	L	L	W	W	W	L	W	L	L	D	L	D	L	W	W	D	+	D	D	W	L	L	W	W	D
Kremin-2 Kremenchuk	L	L	L	L	L	L	L	L	L	L	L	L	D	L	L	L	L	L	L	L	D	L	L	W	L	D
Kudrivka	L	L	D	W	W	W	L	W	W	L	D	W	L	L	D	W	+	D	W	D	L	W	D	L	L	D
Lokomotyv Kyiv	D	L	L	L	L	L	L	L	L	W	D	W	L	D	W	W	L	L	D	D	W	W	D	L	W	D
Metalurh-2 Zaporizhzhia	W	W	W	L	L	L	L	L	L	L	L	W	L	D	L	W	-	-	-	-	-	-	-	-	-	-
Nyva Vinnytsia	L	L	W	D	D	L	D	W	W	L	L	W	W	L	D	D	W	+	D	D	D	L	W	D	L	W
Real Pharma Odesa	W	W	D	L	L	W	L	L	L	D	L	L	L	L	W	L	+	D	D	L	L	L	L	L	L	L
Rukh-2 Lviv	L	W	D	L	W	W	L	L	D	W	L	W	W	L	L	W	+	D	D	D	L	L	W	L	D	D
Skala 1911 Stryi	W	L	D	W	W	W	L	W	L	W	L	L	W	W	L	L	+	D	W	L	W	L	L	W	L	L
Trostianets	L	L	L	D	W	L	D	W	L	W	L	L	W	D	L	L	L	D	L	D	L	D	L	L	L	W
UCSA Tarasivka	D	W	W	W	W	W	D	L	W	W	W	W	W	D	W	W	D	+	D	W	L	W	W	W	W	W
Zviahel	W	W	W	W	L	D	W	W	W	L	W	W	W	W	W	W	+	W	D	L	W	W	D	D	W	W

Source: pfl.ua
W = Win; D = Draw; L = Loss

Notes:

- Metalurh Zaporizhia withdrew its second team from competitions, all matches of its team starting from the Round 17 are forfeited. The rest of the Metalurh's matches were awarded technical losses (marked '-'), to its opponents' technical victory ('+').
- Kremin-2 Kremenchuk by winning over Trostianets on 4 May 2024 in the Round 27 set a new anti-record of 38 matches without win, a streak which was ongoing since 17 September 2022. The previous record of 35 matches existed since 2006.

=== Top goalscorers ===
As of 26 May 2024

Rank	Scorer	Team	Goals (Pen.)
1	(Ukraine) Artur Zahorulko	Nyva Vinnytsia	17 (2)
2	(Ukraine) Denys Ndukve	PFC Zviahel	15 (2)
3	(Ukraine) Bohdan Semenets	Chaika Petropavlivska Borshchahivka	12 (0)
4	2 player(s)		11
6	1 player(s)		10
7	1 player(s)		9
8	4 player(s)		8
12	2 player(s)		7
14	8 player(s)		6
22	8 player(s)		5
30	14 player(s)		4
44	25 player(s)		3
69	50 player(s)		2
119	71 player(s)		1

Notes:

- Players scored in matches against Vast Mykolaiv are included in the scorers' table.

== Post-season play-offs ==
Following the league season, the runner-up and third-placed teams were expected to meet the 2023–24 First League's 16th and 18th-placed teams to contest the 2023–24 Second League promotion. It was UCSA Tarasivka and PFC Zviahel from the Second League that qualified for the play-offs.

Team 1	Agg.	Team 2	1st leg	2nd leg
FC Khust	1 – 2	PFC Zviahel	1–1	0–1
UCSA Tarasivka	7 – 1	Metalurh Zaporizhzhia	3–1	4–0

=== First leg ===
1 June 2024
12:00

FC Khust	1 – 1	PFC Zviahel
Stankovych 55'	Report	Fesenko 76'

Karpaty, Khust
Attendance: 0
Referee: Lyudmyla Telbukh
1 June 2024
13:30

UCSA Tarasivka	3 – 1	Metalurh Zaporizhzhia
Makhniev 27' (pen.); Goulart 83'; Guerreiro 90+4'	Report	Humenyak 29'

Bannikov Stadium, Kyiv
Attendance: 150
Referee: Dmytro Osaulenko

=== Second leg ===
8 June 2024
13:00

PFC Zviahel	1 – 0	FC Khust
Tomandzoto 66'	Report	Byelimenko (yellow card) 65' (yellow-red card) 90+6'

Avanhard, Zviahel
Attendance: 1,200
Referee: Ihor Stashuk

Zviahel won 2–1 on aggregate and was promoted to the 2024–25 Ukrainian First League. Khust was relegated to the 2024–25 Ukrainian Second League. Due to withdrawal of Druzhba Myrivka, Khust was reinstated.

8 June 2024
12:00

Metalurh Zaporizhzhia	0 – 4	UCSA Tarasivka
Kostyuchenko (yellow card) 31' (yellow-red card) 52'; Baranyuk (yellow card) 49' (yellow-red card) 88'	Report	Eseola 9'; Guerreiro 62'; Khovayko 86'; Yevdokymov 90+3'

Slavutych-Arena, Zaporizhzhia
Attendance: 0
Referee: Andriy Zaitsev

UCSA Tarasivka won 7–1 on aggregate and was promoted to the 2024–25 Ukrainian First League. Metalurh Zaporizhzhia was relegated to the 2024–25 Ukrainian Second League. Due to withdrawal of Dnipro-1, Metalurh was reinstated.

== Awards ==
=== Round awards ===
Round	Player			Coach		
Round	Player	Club	Reference	Coach	Club	Reference
Round 1	(Ukraine) Artur Vashchyshyn	PFC Zviahel		(Ukraine) Andriy Sapuha	Karpaty-2 Lviv	
Round 2	(Ukraine) Mykola Vechurko	Chaika P. Borshchahivka		(Ukraine) Dmytro Chyrykal	Druzhba Myrivka	
Round 3	(Ukraine) Anton Yevdokymov	UCSA Tarasivka		(Ukraine) Mykola Tsymbal	UCSA Tarasivka	
Round 4	(Ukraine) Valeriy Skydan	PFC Zviahel		(Ukraine) Andriy Zubchenko	Metalurh-2 Zaporizhzhia	
Round 5	(Ukraine) Maksym Maitak	PFC Zviahel		(Ukraine) Mykola Tsymbal	UCSA Tarasivka	
Round 6	(Ukraine) Artur Zahorulko	Nyva Vinnytsia		(Ukraine) Serhiy Syzykhin	Chaika P. Borshchahivka	
Round 7	(Ukraine) Vitaliy Katrych	Karpaty-2 Lviv		(Ukraine) Serhiy Syzykhin	Chaika P. Borshchahivka	
Round 8	(Ukraine) Taras Puchkovskyi	Skala 1911 Stryi		(Ukraine) Dmytro Chyrykal	Druzhba Myrivka	
Round 9	(Brazil) Gabriel Goulart	UCSA Tarasivka		(Ukraine) Valeriy Shapoval	FC Trostianets	
Round 10	(Ukraine) Denys Ndukve	PFC Zviahel		(Ukraine) Serhiy Shyshchenko	PFC Zviahel	
Round 11	(Ukraine) Vitaliy Dubiley	Chaika P. Borshchahivka		(Ukraine) Dmytro Chyrykal	Druzhba Myrivka	
Round 12	(Ukraine) Vasyl Runich	Rukh-2 Lviv		(Ukraine) Volodymyr Bezubyak	Rukh-2 Lviv	
Round 13	(Ukraine) Dmytro Irodovskyi	Metalurh-2 Zaporizhzhia		(Ukraine) Serhiy Datsenko	FC Kudrivka	
Round 14	(Ukraine) Oleksiy Sakhnenko	Lokomotyv Kyiv		(Ukraine) Yuriy Yaroshenko	Nyva Vinnytsia	
Round 15	(Ukraine) Anton Yaremenko	FC Trostianets		(Ukraine) Mykhailo Basarab	Skala 1911 Stryi	
Round 16	(Ukraine) Bohdan Semenets	Chaika P. Borshchahivka		(Ukraine) Mykhailo Basarab	Skala 1911 Stryi	
Round 17	(Ukraine) Vadym Sydun	Karpaty-2 Lviv		(Ukraine) Roman Hnativ	Karpaty-2 Lviv	
Round 18	(Ukraine) Yan Karanha	Lokomotyv Kyiv		(Ukraine) Vadym Lazorenko	Lokomotyv Kyiv	
Round 19	(Ukraine) Artur Zahorulko	Nyva Vinnytsia		(Ukraine) Serhiy Shyshchenko	PFC Zviahel	
winter break
Round 20	(Ukraine) Andriy Fesenko	PFC Zviahel		(Ukraine) Dmytro Chyrykal	Druzhba Myrivka	
Round 21	(Ukraine) Oleksandr Huskov	Chaika P. Borshchahivka		(Ukraine) Mykhailo Basarab	Skala 1911 Stryi	
Round 22	(Ukraine) Mykyta Fedotov	UCSA Tarasivka		(Ukraine) Mykola Tsymbal	UCSA Tarasivka	
Round 23	(Ukraine) Yan Morhovskyi	PFC Zviahel		(Ukraine) Dmytro Chyrykal	Druzhba Myrivka	
Round 24	(Brazil) Vavá Guerreiro	UCSA Tarasivka		(Ukraine) Mykola Tsymbal	UCSA Tarasivka	
Round 25	(Ukraine) Hlib Venher	Chaika Petropavlivska Borshchahivka		(Ukraine) Vasyl Baranov	FC Kudrivka	
Round 26	(Ukraine) Denys Teslyuk	Rukh-2 Lviv		(Ukraine) Mykola Tsymbal	UCSA Tarasivka	
Round 27	(Ukraine) Ivan Somov	Druzhba Myrivka		(Ukraine) Yaroslav Zdyrko	Kremin-2 Kremenchuk	
Round 28	(Ukraine) Vladyslav Klymenko	Chaika Petropavlivska Borshchahivka		(Ukraine) Dmytro Chyrykal	Druzhba Myrivka	
Round 29	(Paraguay) Pablo Castro	UCSA Tarasivka		(Ukraine) Volodymyr Bezubyak	Rukh-2 Lviv	
Round 30	(Ukraine) Andriy Storchous	Druzhba Myrivka		(Ukraine) Dmytro Chyrykal	Druzhba Myrivka	

== Number of teams by region ==
Number	Region	Team(s)
3	Lviv Oblast	Skala 1911 Stryi, Karpaty-2 Lviv, Rukh-2 Lviv
3	Kyiv Oblast	Chaika Petropavlivska Borshchahivka, Druzhba Myrivka, UCSA Tarasivka
1	Chernihiv Oblast	Kudrivka
1	Kyiv	Lokomotyv Kyiv
1	Mykolaiv Oblast	Vast Mykolaiv
1	Odesa Oblast	Real Pharma Odesa
1	Poltava Oblast	Kremin-2 Kremenchuk
1	Sumy Oblast	Trostianets
1	Vinnytsia Oblast	Nyva Vinnytsia
1	Zaporizhia Oblast	Metalurh-2 Zaporizhzhia
1	Zhytomyr Oblast	Zviahel

== See also ==
- 2023–24 Ukrainian Premier League
- 2023–24 Ukrainian First League
- 2023–24 Ukrainian Football Amateur League
