= Artem Hryshchenko =

Ukrainian footballer (born 1993)

Personal information
- Full name: Artem Oleksandrovych Hryshchenko
- Date of birth: 29 April 1993 (age 33)
- Place of birth: Chernihiv, Ukraine
- Height: 1.74 m (5 ft 9 in)
- Position: Midfielder

Team information
- Current team: Kalynivka
- Number: 27

Youth career
- 2010: Yunist Chernihiv

Senior career*
Years	Team	Apps	(Gls)
2011	Polissya Dobryanka	16	(5)
2013–2014	YSB Chernihiv	15	(5)
2013–2015	Karpaty Lviv	0	(0)
2014–2015	Nyva Ternopil	12	(1)
2015–2016	Desna Chernihiv	18	(1)
2016–2017	Avanhard Koryukivka	10	(5)
2017–2018	Sumy	17	(1)
2019–2022	Kudrivka	10	(1)
2022–2024	Druzhba Myrivka	20	(3)
2024–	Kalynivka	0	(0)
- * Club domestic league appearances and goals as of 12 August 2026

Artem Oleksandrovych Hryshchenko (Ukrainian: Артем Олександрович Грищенко; born 29 April 1993) is a Ukrainian professional footballer who plays as a midfielder.

== Playing career ==
In 2010, he started his career at Yunist Chernihiv. From 2011 to 2012, he played for Polissya Dobryanka. In 2013, he played in the amateur championship of Ukraine as part of the YSB Chernihiv. He then joined Karpaty Lviv, but due to the high competition in the first team, he played only in the reserve team of here. At the beginning of March 2015, he joined the Nyva Ternopil, making his debut on 21 March against Stal Kamianske in Ukrainian First League. On 1 May, he scored his first goal against Naftovyk Okhtyrka. In the summer of 2015, he moved to Desna Chernihiv and made his debut on 26 July against Naftovyk Okhtyrka. On 21 May 2016, he scored his only goal with his new club against FC Ternopil. In summer 2017 he moved to Sumy in the Ukrainian First League, where he played 17 matches. In 2023 he moved to Druzhba Myrivka in the Ukrainian Second League. On 9 September he made his debut against Kremin-2 Kremenchuk at the Druzhba stadium in Kaharlyk.

On 11 August 2026 he scored twice against Chaika Vyshhorod in Ukrainian Cup.

== Honours ==
=== Club ===
Kalynivka

- Kyiv Oblast championshipː 2024–25
- Kyiv Oblast Cup: 2024–25

Druzhba Myrivka

- Ukrainian Second League: 2023–24
- Ukrainian Football Amateur League: 2022–23
- Ukrainian Amateur Cup: 2022–23
- Kyiv Oblast Football Championship: 2022–23

Kudrivka

- Chernihiv Oblast Football Cup 2021
- Chernihiv Oblast Super Cup: 2021
- Kyiv Oblast Football Federation: 2020
- Kyiv Oblast Football Cup: 2021

=== Individual ===
- PFL Winter Cup Top scorer: 2023 (4 goals)
