= 2023 PFL Winter Cup =

Ukrainian Football season

- Season: 2022–23
- Dates: 4 February 2023 – 18 March 2023
- Cup holder: Livyi Bereh Kyiv
- Top goalscorer: Artem Hryshchenko (Druzhba Myrivka); 4 goals

The 2023 PFL Winter Cup was one of friendly competitions which was introduced by the Ukrainian PFL in the 2022–23 season's "winter break intermission". The competition was organized by the Professional Football League of Ukraine. It was won by FC Livyi Bereh Kyiv.

The competition started on 4 February 2023 and continued until 18 March 2023. On 19 December 2022 there took place a conference of the League's clubs and teams that confirmed their participation in the competition. Initially participation was confirmed by 8 teams from the PFL and 4 – amateurs. At the end only seven teams confirmed their participation 5 from PFL and 2 from amateurs. In interview to journalists the PFL president Oleksandr Kadenko explained that it was planned to organize tournament with group stage and playoffs and there were some 12-15 clubs interested to take part in the tournament. He also expressed his expectation that in future those plans will be realized.

== Teams ==
=== Location map ===
The following displays the location of teams.

Location of teams in the 2022-23 Ukrainian Amateur League

=== Stadiums ===
Team	Pop. place	Stadium	League tier
Livyi Bereh	Kyiv	Livyi Bereh	– (3)
Nyva	Buzova	Buzova Arena	3
Nyva	Vinnytsia	Tsentralnyi Stadion; Stadion VHPK	3
Chaika	Petropavlivska Borshchahivka	SKK Sofiyivskyi, Sofiyivska Borshchahivka	3
Druzhba	Myrivka	NTK Kolos, Sofiyivska Borshchahivka; Livyi Bereh	Am
Okko	Kharkiv	NTK Kolos, Sofiyivska Borshchahivka	–
Kremin	Kremenchuk	Kremin Arena im. Babayeva	2

== Final table ==
Pos	Team	Pld	W	D	L	GF	GA	GD	Pts	Promotion, qualification or relegation	LBK	NBU	DRU	NVI	CHA	KRE	OKO
1	Livyi Bereh Kyiv	6	6	0	0	12	0	+12	18	Winner		1–0			1–0	2–0	4–0
2	Nyva Buzova	6	4	1	1	13	5	+8	13	Runner-up					3–1		3–1
3	Druzhba Myrivka	6	3	0	3	9	7	+2	9	Runner-up	0–1	2–4		3–0			
4	Nyva Vinnytsia	6	2	1	3	5	9	−4	7		0–3	0–0					2–0
5	Chaika Petropavlivska Borshchahivka	6	2	0	4	11	8	+3	6 (Note: Head-to-head points: Chaika 3; Kremin 0)				0–2	2–0		8–0	2–0
6	Kremin Kremenchuk	6	2	0	4	8	16	−8	6			0–3	1–2	3–1			
7	Okko Kharkiv	6	1	0	5	2	15	−13	3				1–0			0–4	

Source: pfl.ua
Rules for classification: 1) Points; 2) Wins; 3) Better goal difference; 4) Most goals scored; 5) If any two or more teams has same number of points advantage receive that team that in games with all its opponents that earned same number of points for tiebreak are applied following criteria – 5.1) Points; 5.2) Wins; 5.3) Better goal difference; 5.4) Most goals scored; 6) In event if all criteria for rule 5 are equal, placing for teams is determined according to general criteria for all teams 1, 2, 3, 4; 7) Draw of lots.
Notes:

== See also ==
- 2022–23 Ukrainian Second League
- 2022–23 Ukrainian First League
- 2022–23 Ukrainian Premier League
- 2022–23 Ukrainian Amateur Cup
- Ukrainian League Cup
