= Rocyan =

Brazilian footballer (born 2000)

Personal information
- Full name: Rocyan Fernando Santiago Mendonça
- Date of birth: 10 January 2000 (age 26)
- Place of birth: Ourinhos, Brazil
- Height: 1.79 m (5 ft 10 1/2 in)
- Position: Midfielder

Team information
- Current team: UCSA Tarasivka
- Number: 88

Youth career
- –2018: Grêmio
- 2020–2022: Atlético Mineiro

Senior career*
Years	Team	Apps	(Gls)
2018–2020	Austria Lustenau	7	(1)
2021–2022	Atlético Mineiro	0	(0)
2022	Betim Futebol	0	(0)
2022–2023	Fortaleza B	0	(0)
2023	Frederiquense	0	(0)
2024–	UCSA Tarasivka	4	(1)
- * Club domestic league appearances and goals as of 31 December 2024

Rocyan Fernando Santiago Mendonça (born 10 January 2000), known simply as Rocyan, is a Brazilian footballer who currently plays as a midfielder for UCSA Tarasivka.

== Career statistics ==
=== Club ===
As of 28 April 2024

Club	Season	League			Cup		Continental		Other		Total	
Club	Season	Division	Apps	Goals	Apps	Goals	Apps	Goals	Apps	Goals	Apps	Goals
Austria Lustenau	2018–19	2. Liga	7	1	1 (Note: Appearances in the Austrian Cup)	0	–		0	0	8	1
UCSA Tarasivka	2023–24	Druha Liha	3	1	0 (Note: Appearances in the Ukrainian Cup)	0	–		0	0	3	1
Career total			10	2	1	0	0	0	0	0	11	2
