= 2022–23 Ukrainian Football Amateur League =

Ukrainian Football season

Ukrainian Amateur Football Championship
- Season: 2022–23
- Dates: Group stage: 10 September 2022 – 28 May 2023; Winter break: 12 November 2022 – 8 April 2023; Play-offs: 3 – 30 June 2023
- Teams: 15
- Final stage winner: Druzhba Myrivka (1st title) Shturm Ivankiv (losing finalist)
- Promoted: 3 – Druzhba, Skala 1911, Lokomotyv

The 2022–23 Ukrainian football championship among amateur teams was the 27th season since it replaced the football championship of physical culture teams. The Association of Amateur Football of Ukraine (AAFU) organizes the league competition.

On 5 September 2022, the AAFU published information about the upcoming season with a tentative composition. Since the Russo-Ukrainian War grew in intensity in 2022, many clubs were not able to field their teams for the competition.

The championship started on 10 September 2022, and regular calendar matches continued until the end of October, with a few postponed games conducted as late as 12 November 2022. The championship resumed in April with several postponed games as early as 8 April 2023.

== Teams ==
Seven (7) teams from last season reapplied for this season. For various reasons, 17 teams did not reapply and withdrew. Thus, the competition was reduced in size from 3 groups to 2.

=== Returning/reformed clubs ===
- Fakel Lypovets – (last played during 2018–19 season)
- Kulykiv-Bilka – (last played as Yunist Verkhnia Bilka during 2021–22 season)
- LSTM 536 Lutsk – (last played during 2019–20 season)
- Skala 1911 Stryi – (late start, last played as Avanhard Stryi during 1973 season)
- Varatyk Kolomyia – (last played during 2020–21 season)

=== Debut ===
List of teams that are debuting this season in the league:

- Druzhba Myrivka
- Kolos Polonne
- Shturm Ivankiv

=== Withdrawn teams ===
List of clubs that took part in last year competition, but chose not to participate in 2022–23 season:

- Bila Tserkva
- Dovbush Chernivtsi
- Feniks Pidmonastyr
- Kakhovka
- Khliborob Nyzhni Torhayi
- Kudrivka
- Lehioner Dnipro
- Mayak Sarny
- Nyva Terebovlia
- ODEK Orzhiv
- OFKIP Kyiv
- Olimp Kamianske
- OSDYuShOR-FC Zaporizhia
- Prykarpattia-Teplovyk Ivano-Frankivsk
- UCSA Tarasivka
- Urahan Cherniiv
- Yednist Kyiv

=== Location map ===
The following displays the location of teams.

Location of teams in the 2022-23 Ukrainian Amateur League

=== Stadiums ===
Group A

| Team | Pop. place | Stadium | Position in 2021–22 |
|---|---|---|---|
| Ahron | Velyki Hayi | Tsentralny stadion Village Stadium | Am1, 1st |
| Kulykiv | Kulykiv | Arena Kulykiv | Reg |
| LSTM 536 | Lutsk | Stadion, Knyahynok | Reg |
| Varatyk | Kolomyia | Stadion Kamenyar, Voskresyntsi | Reg |
| Kolos | Polonne | Stadion Polon | Reg |
| Fakel | Lypovets | Stadion Kolos | Reg |
| Skala 1911 | Stryi | Stadion Sokil | Reg |

Group B

| Team | Pop. place | Stadium | Position in 2021–22 |
|---|---|---|---|
| Motor | Zaporizhia | Stadion Zirka, Kropyvnytskyi; Stadion Druzhba, Kaharlyk, Kyiv Oblast | Am3, 1st |
| Olimpiya | Savyntsi | Stadion Start, Myrhorod | Am2, 3rd |
| Naftovyk | Okhtyrka | Naftovyk Stadium | Am2, 4th |
| Atlet | Kyiv | Stadion Atlet | Am2, 5th |
| Zirka | Kropyvnytskyi | Stadion Zirka | Am3, 5th |
| Lokomotyv | Kyiv | Stadion Lokomotyv | Am1, 10th |
| Druzhba | Myrivka | Stadion Kaharlychany, Kaharlyk | Reg |
| Shturm | Ivankiv | Livyi Bereh, Kyiv | Reg |

Notes:

- Reg — regional championship (Regions of Ukraine)
- Am[#] — AAFU championship where sign (#) indicates Group number

== Group stage ==
=== Group 1 ===
| Pos | Team | Pld | W | D | L | GF | GA | GD | Pts | Promotion, qualification or relegation |
|---|---|---|---|---|---|---|---|---|---|---|
| 1 | Kolos Polonne (Q) | 12 | 8 | 3 | 1 | 28 | 10 | +18 | 27 | Qualification to final stage |
| 2 | Ahron Velyki Hayi (Q) | 12 | 8 | 2 | 2 | 20 | 10 | +10 | 26 | Qualification to final stage |
| 3 | Skala 1911 Stryi (Q) | 12 | 8 | 1 | 3 | 37 | 8 | +29 | 25 | Qualification to final stage Admission to Ukrainian Second League |
| 4 | LSTM 536 Lutsk (Q) | 12 | 5 | 2 | 5 | 34 | 18 | +16 | 17 | Qualification to final stage Withdrawn after season |
| 5 | Kulykiv | 12 | 4 | 3 | 5 | 23 | 19 | +4 | 15 | |
| 6 | Fakel Lypovets | 12 | 3 | 1 | 8 | 17 | 29 | −12 | 10 | Withdrawn after season |
| 7 | Varatyk Kolomyia | 12 | 0 | 0 | 12 | 7 | 72 | −65 | 0 | Withdrawn after season |

Source: http://www.aafu.org.ua/
Rules for classification: 1) Points; 2) Wins; 3) Better goal difference; 4) Most goals scored; 5) If any two or more teams has same number of points advantage receive that team that in games with all its opponents that earned same number of points for tiebreak are applied following criteria – 5.1) Points; 5.2) Wins; 5.3) Better goal difference; 5.4) Most goals scored; 6) In event if all criteria for rule 5 are equal, placing for teams is determined according to general criteria for all teams 1, 2, 3, 4; 7) Draw of lots.
(Q) Qualification to the phase indicated

=== Group 2 ===
| Pos | Team | Pld | W | D | L | GF | GA | GD | Pts | Promotion, qualification or relegation |
|---|---|---|---|---|---|---|---|---|---|---|
| 1 | Druzhba Myrivka (Q) | 14 | 10 | 3 | 1 | 24 | 7 | +17 | 33 | Qualification to final stage Admission to Ukrainian Second League |
| 2 | Naftovyk Okhtyrka (Q) | 14 | 8 | 1 | 5 | 19 | 22 | −3 | 25 | Qualification to final stage |
| 3 | Shturm Ivankiv (Q) | 14 | 7 | 3 | 4 | 19 | 11 | +8 | 24 | Qualification to final stage |
| 4 | Olimpiya Savyntsi (Q) | 14 | 6 | 4 | 4 | 24 | 14 | +10 | 22 | Qualification to final stage |
| 5 | Lokomotyv Kyiv | 14 | 6 | 3 | 5 | 17 | 9 | +8 | 21 | Admission to Ukrainian Second League |
| 6 | Atlet Kyiv | 14 | 5 | 0 | 9 | 19 | 22 | −3 | 15 | |
| 7 | Motor Zaporizhzhia | 14 | 4 | 0 | 10 | 7 | 23 | −16 | 12 | Withdrawn |
| 8 | Zirka Kropyvnytskyi | 14 | 2 | 2 | 10 | 15 | 36 | −21 | 8 | |

Source: http://www.aafu.org.ua/
Rules for classification: 1) Points; 2) Wins; 3) Better goal difference; 4) Most goals scored; 5) If any two or more teams has same number of points advantage receive that team that in games with all its opponents that earned same number of points for tiebreak are applied following criteria – 5.1) Points; 5.2) Wins; 5.3) Better goal difference; 5.4) Most goals scored; 6) In event if all criteria for rule 5 are equal, placing for teams is determined according to general criteria for all teams 1, 2, 3, 4; 7) Draw of lots.
(Q) Qualification to the second stage

Notes

- On 13 February 2023 Motor Zaporizhia was withdrawn from competition.

== Final stage ==
To the stage qualify eight teams, selection of which is determined exclusively by the AAFU Commission in conducting competitions.

=== Teams qualified ===
In parentheses are indicated number of times the club qualified for this phase.

- Group 1: Kolos Polonne, Ahron Velyki Hayi, Skala 1911 Stryi, LSTM 536 Lutsk
- Group 2: Druzhba Myrivka, Naftovyk Okhtyrka, Shturm Ivankiv, Olimpiya Savyntsi (2)

=== Quarterfinals ===
Games are scheduled for 4 and 11 June 2023.

| Team 1 | Agg. | Team 2 | 1st leg | 2nd leg |
First leg – June 3, Second leg – June 10
| Skala 1911 Stryi | 2 – 1 | Naftovyk Okhtyrka | 1–0 | 1–1 |
First leg – June 4, Second leg – June 10
| Olimpiya Savyntsi | 4 – 4 (a) | Kolos Polonne | 2–0 | 2–4 |
First leg – June 4, Second leg – June 11
| Shturm Ivankiv | 2 – 1 | Ahron Velyki Hayi | 1–0 | 1–1 |
| LSTM 536 Lutsk | 1 – 4 | Druzhba Myrivka | 1–3 | 0–1 |

| 3 June 2023 | Skala 1911 Stryi | 1–0 | Naftovyk Okhtyrka | Stryi, Lviv Oblast |
| | Volkov 34' | Report | | Stadium: Sokil; Attendance: 0 Referee: Ivan Salash (Kalush) |

| 4 June 2023 | Olimpiya Savyntsi | 2–0 | Kolos Polonne | Myrhorod, Poltava Oblast |
| | Solop 17'; Subochev 51' | Report | | Stadium: Start; Attendance: 0 Referee: Ihor Stashuk (Chernihiv) |

| 4 June 2023 | Shturm Ivankiv | 1–0 | Ahron Velyki Hayi | Kyiv |
| | Shchastlyvtsev 19' | Report | | Stadium: Dynamo Training Center; Attendance: 0 Referee: Dmytro Osaulenko (Poltava) |

| 4 June 2023 | LSTM 536 Lutsk | 1–3 | Druzhba Myrivka | Knyahynynok, Volyn Oblast |
| | Kabanov 16' | Report | Lystopad 55' (pen.); Holovko 64'; Borodenko 89' | Stadium: Alians Arena; Attendance: 0 Referee: Oleksandr Tytov (Donetsk) |

| 10 June 2023 | Kolos Polonne | 4–2 | Olimpiya Savyntsi | Polonne, Khmelnytskyi Oblast |
| | Kulish 5', 12'; Kostenko 66'; Nikitchuk 74' | Report | Nasibulin 50'; Kunyev 85'; Kunyev (yellow card) 85' (yellow-red card) 90+4' | Stadium: Polon; Referee: Myroslav Lypko (Ivano-Frankivsk) |

| 10 June 2023 | Ahron Velyki Hayi | 1–1 | Shturm Ivankiv | Velyki Hayi, Ternopil Oblast |
| | Bilyk 77' | Report | Rublyov 56' (pen.) | Stadium: of Velyki Hayi; Referee: Vadym Zaprutnyak (Vinnytsia) |

| 11 June 2023 | Druzhba Myrivka | 1–0 | LSTM 536 Lutsk | Kaharlyk, Kyiv Oblast |
| | Machulenko (yellow card) 45' (yellow-red card) 45'; Dedyayev 90+2' | Report | Baybula (yellow card) 66' (yellow-red card) 72' | Stadium: Kaharlychyny Fitness and Recreation Complex; Referee: Oleh Kohut (Ternopil) |

| 11 June 2023 | Naftovyk Okhtyrka | 1–1 | Skala 1911 Stryi | Sumy |
| | Honchar 59' | Report | Mordas 81' | Stadium: Avanhard; Referee: Artem Mykhailyuk (Zhytomyr) |

=== Semifinals ===
Games are scheduled for 18 and 25 June 2023.

| Team 1 | Agg. | Team 2 | 1st leg | 2nd leg |
First leg – June 18, Second leg – June 24
| Druzhba Myrivka | 5 – 1 | Skala 1911 Stryi | 4–1 | 1–0 |
| Shturm Ivankiv | 5 – 1 | Olimpiya Savyntsi | 3–0 | 2–1 |

| 18 June 2023 | Druzhba Myrivka | 4–1 | Skala 1911 Stryi | Kaharlyk, Kyiv Oblast |
| 13:00 | Lystopad 33' (pen.); Holovko 55'; Yuzefovych (red card) 59'; Lystopad (yellow card) 90+1' (yellow-red card) 90'; Borodenko 90+2' | Report | Yanata 39' (o.g.); Petryk 66' | Stadium: Kaharlychyny Fitness and Recreation Complex; Referee: Yevhen Tsybulko (Cherkasy Oblast) |

| 18 June 2023 | Shturm Ivankiv | 3–0 | Olimpiya Savyntsi | Kyiv (Koncha-Zaspa) |
| 14:00 | Pomazan 17'; Schastlyvtsev 21'; Berezka 51' | Report | | Stadium: Dynamo Training Center; Referee: Yehor Kevlych (Kropyvnytskyi) |

| 24 June 2023 | Skala 1911 Stryi | 0–1 | Druzhba Myrivka | Stryi, Lviv Oblast |
| 12:00 | | Report | Porokhnya 13' | Stadium: Sokil; Referee: Vitaliy Malyar (Khmelnytskyi) |

| 24 June 2023 | Olimpiya Savyntsi | 1–2 | Shturm Ivankiv | Myrhorod, Poltava Oblast |
| 14:00 | Burlyai 65' | Report | Rublyov 33'; Starhorodskyi 90+1' | Stadium: Start; Referee: Lyudmyla Telbukh (Dnipro) |

=== Final ===
The final game is scheduled for 30 June 2023.

| Team 1 | Score | Team 2 |
|---|---|---|
| Druzhba Myrivka | 2–0 | Shturm Ivankiv |

| 30 June 2023 | Druzhba Myrivka | 2–0 | Shturm Ivankiv | Kyiv |
| 13:00 | Storchous 26' (Note: The AAFU official website reported that both goals were scored by Hryshchenko.); Hryshchenko 90' | Report | Lyashchuk (yellow card) 45+2' (yellow-red card) 47' | Stadium: NTK im. Bannikova; Referee: Oleksandr Kalyonov (Ivano-Frankivsk) |

== Promotions to the Second League ==
The amateur teams are allowed to participate in the Ukrainian championship among teams of the 2023–24 Ukrainian Second League under such conditions:

- Team participated in the Ukrainian championship among amateur teams throughout the 2022–23 season and was a participant of the championship play-off stage.
- The club received a license in accordance to the Regulation on licensing of football clubs of the Ukrainian Second League.
- The club and its results of participation in the AAFU competitions meet the requirements that are defined in regulations of the All-Ukrainian competitions in football among clubs' teams of the 2022–23 Professional Football League of Ukraine.

== Number of teams by region ==
| Number | Region | Team(s) |
|---|---|---|
| 2 | Kyiv | Atlet, Lokomotyv |
| 2 | Kyiv Oblast | Shturm Ivankiv, Druzhba Myrivka |
| 2 | Lviv Oblast | FC Kulykiv, Skala 1911 Stryi |
| 1 | Ivano-Frankivsk Oblast | Varatyk Kolomyia |
| 1 | Khmelnytskyi Oblast | Kolos Polonne |
| 1 | Kirovohrad Oblast | Zirka Kropyvnytskyi |
| 1 | Poltava Oblast | Olimpiya Savyntsi |
| 1 | Sumy Oblast | Naftovyk Okhtyrka |
| 1 | Ternopil Oblast | Ahron Velyki Hayi |
| 1 | Vinnytsia Oblast | Fakel Lypovets |
| 1 | Volyn Oblast | LSTM 536 Lutsk |
| 1 | Zaporizhia Oblast | Motor Zaporizhia |

== See also ==
- 2022–23 Ukrainian Second League
- 2022–23 Ukrainian First League
- 2022–23 Ukrainian Premier League
- 2022–23 Ukrainian Amateur Cup
