= Sytnykov =

Sytnykov (Ukrainian: Ситников) is a Ukrainian surname. Notable people with the surname include:

- Anton Sytnykov (born 1991), Ukrainian footballer
- Mykyta Sytnykov (born 2004), Ukrainian footballer
