= Petruk (surname) =

Petruk is a Ukrainian surname. Notable people with the surname include:

- Mykola Petruk (born 1950), Ukrainian politician
- Nikita Petruk (born 2003), Ukrainian footballer
- Roman Petruk (born 2003), Ukrainian high jumper
