= Oleh Luzhnyi =

Ukrainian retired footballer (born 1968)

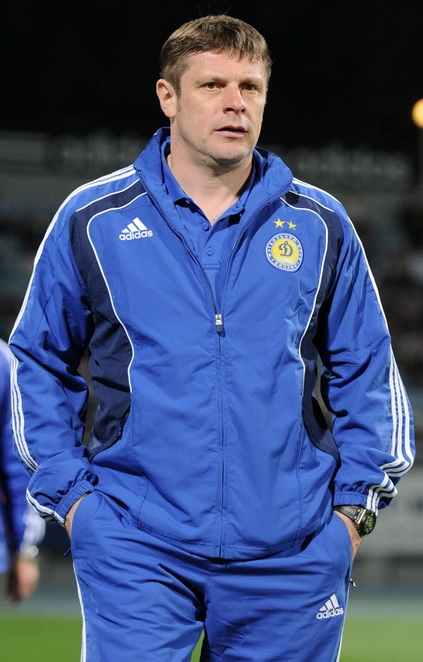
- Luzhnyi in his assistant role at Dynamo Kyiv (2010)

Personal information
- Full name: Oleh Romanovych Luzhnyi
- Date of birth: 5 August 1968 (age 58)
- Place of birth: Lviv, Ukrainian SSR, Soviet Union
- Height: 1.80 m (5 ft 11 in)
- Position: Right-back

Youth career
- Sports school "Karpaty"

Senior career*
Years	Team	Apps	(Gls)
1985–1988	Torpedo Lutsk	88	(1)
1988	SKA Karpaty Lviv	29	(0)
1989–1999	Dynamo Kyiv	253	(13)
1997–1998	→ Dynamo-2 Kyiv	2	(0)
1999–2003	Arsenal	75	(0)
2003–2004	Wolverhampton Wanderers	6	(0)
2005	Venta	9	(0)
Total		462	(14)

International career
1990	Soviet Union (U-21)	4	(0)
1989–1990	Soviet Union	8	(0)
1992–2003	Ukraine	52	(0)

Managerial career
- 2005: Venta (player–manager)
- 2006–2012: Dynamo Kyiv (assistant)
- 2007: Dynamo Kyiv (interim)
- 2010: Dynamo Kyiv (interim)
- 2012–2013: Tavriya Simferopol
- 2016: Karpaty Lviv (joint with Volodymyr Bezubyak)
- 2017–2019: Dynamo Kyiv (assistant)
Medal record
Men's football
Representing Soviet Union
UEFA European Under-21 Championship
Winner	1990
- * Club domestic league appearances and goals

Oleh Romanovych Luzhnyi (Ukrainian: Оле́г Рома́нович Лу́жний; born 5 August 1968) is a Ukrainian former professional footballer who played as a right-back.

== Club career ==
Luzhnyi is a product of the Karpaty sports school (coached by Yuriy Hdanskyi and Yuriy Dyachuk-Stavytskyi) and later studied at the Lviv State School of Physical Culture. He first played for Ukrainian clubs Torpedo Lutsk (1985–88) and SKA Karpaty Lviv (1988) in Soviet lower football leagues.

=== Dynamo Kyiv ===
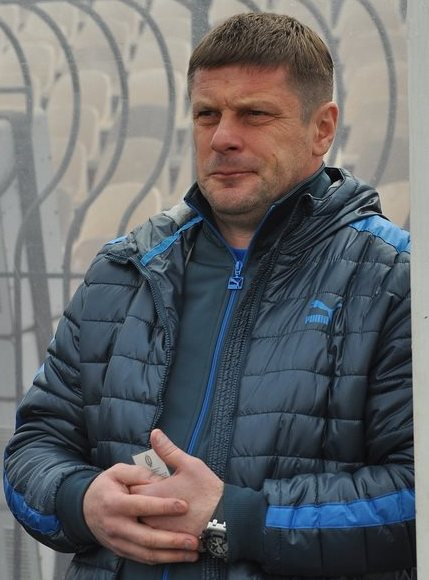
Luzhnyi while at a game

Luzhnyi signed for Dynamo Kyiv in 1989 and became a regular at right-back, winning the domestic double in 1990 and seven consecutive Ukrainian league titles between 1993 and 1999. He was the captain of Dynamo Kyiv's Champions League sides that defeated Barcelona 3–0 at home and 4–0 away in the group stage of the 1997–98 season and eliminated holders Real Madrid 3–1 on aggregate in the quarter finals en route to the semi-finals in 1998–99.

=== Arsenal ===
Luzhnyi signed for English club Arsenal in the summer of 1999 after impressing manager Arsène Wenger in Kyiv's clashes with Arsenal in the Champions League. He was signed as cover for Lee Dixon, although he was unable to fully displace the England international. While never a regular starter with the Gunners (the young Cameroonian Lauren was signed a year later as Dixon's long-term replacement), Luzhnyi still played 110 matches in four years at the club, either at right-back or, less frequently, at centre-back, and even captained the team once in the League Cup. In the 2001–02 season, he won a double (the FA Premier League and the FA Cup) with Arsenal. He contributed 18 league appearances, as Arsenal won the 2001-02 FA Premier League. His last match for the Gunners was the 2003 FA Cup Final (which Arsenal won, beating Southampton 1–0), Luzhny's best performance for the club.

=== Wolverhampton Wanderers ===
Luzhnyi signed for newly promoted Wolverhampton Wanderers in the summer of 2003. He spent a single season there, but only made ten appearances for the side, and was released by Wolves in the summer of 2004 following their relegation from the Premier League.

== International career ==
On the international stage, Luzhnyi made his debut at the age of 20 for the Soviet Union in 1989, winning eight caps but missing the 1990 World Cup because of injury. He also missed out on the final match-up with Yugoslavia for the 1990 UEFA European Under-21 Championship title. At the quarter finals of the under-21 tournament, the Soviet Union under-21 team managed to eliminate the under-21 team of West Germany, which had players like Stefan Effenberg, Oliver Bierhoff, Marcel Witeczek, and others.

After the Soviet Union's dissolution, Luzhnyi became one of the few former Soviet international players who went on to play for Ukraine, playing 52 times for his country between 1992 and 2003. However, his side never reached the tournament finals, losing three times in the play-offs.

Luzhnyi captained the national side a record 39 times and achieved immense personal recognition in his country. In December 2000 he was voted into the Ukrainian 'Team of the Century' according to a poll by The Ukrainsky Futbol weekly. Luzhnyi received the fourth biggest number of votes, behind only to Oleg Blokhin, Andriy Shevchenko and Anatoliy Demyanenko.

== Managerial career ==
Luzhnyi had a brief spell at Latvian side Venta as player-coach in 2005, but left the club after it ran into financial problems. He has now retired from playing and in June 2006 became assistant coach at Dynamo Kyiv.

Luzhnyi was named interim manager of Dynamo Kyiv on 5 November 2007 after the resignation of Yozhef Sabo. He led the club to three league wins in three matches, including a 2–1 home victory against perennial rivals Shakhtar Donetsk, as well as into the semi-finals of the Ukrainian Cup. However, during the same period Dynamo suffered heavy Champions League defeats away at Manchester United and Sporting Lisbon and at home to Roma.

On 8 December 2007, Dynamo Kyiv unveiled a new permanent manager, Yury Syomin, and a few days later it was announced that Luzhnyi would continue as an assistant coach under the new manager.

On 1 October 2010, he was again named as interim manager of Dynamo Kyiv after the resignation of Valery Gazzaev. The first match was lost 2–0 to Shakhtar Donetsk at Donbas Arena. After the 19th round match against PFC Sevastopol Luzhnyi informed the fans that he will not return after the winter break. He was replaced by Yury Syomin on 24 December 2010.

After leaving Dynamo in 2012, Luzhnyi became the head coach of Tavriya Simferopol. However, after the first season the club ended up on the 11th place in the tournament table, its worst result in almost a decade, so in July 2013 Luzhnyi's contract was prematurely ended.

After a two years' pause in his managing career, in January 2016 Luzhny was hired as a temporary head coach of his native Karpaty, but resigned after a probe period at the end of the season. In 2017 he returned to work in the coaching staff of Dynamo Kyiv, then headed by Alyaksandr Khatskevich. He remained in the club until the end of Khatskevich's term as coach.

As of 2025, Luzhnyi worked in an administrative position at the Ukrainian Association of Football.

== Personal life ==
Luzhnyi turned down the chance to coach in England in 2022 in order to fight for Ukraine after the Russian invasion, joining the Territorial Defence Forces. In 2025 he published his autobiography.

== Career statistics ==
=== Club ===
Appearances and goals by club, season and competition
Club	Season	League			Cup		Europe		Other (Note: Appearances in National Super Cup and League Cup)		Total	
Club	Season		Apps	Goals	Apps	Goals	Apps	Goals	Apps	Goals	Apps	Goals
Torpedo Lutsk	1985	Vtoraya Liga	13	0	–	–	–	–	–	–	13	0
Torpedo Lutsk	1986	Vtoraya Liga	34	0	–	–	–	–	–	–	34	0
Torpedo Lutsk	1987	Vtoraya Liga	30	0			–	–	–	–		
Torpedo Lutsk	1988	Vtoraya Liga	11	1	–	–	–	–	–	–	11	1
Torpedo Lutsk	Total		88	1			0	0	0	0		
SKA Karpaty Lviv	1988	Pervaya Liga	29	0	–	–	–	–	–	–	29	0
Dynamo Kyiv	1988	Vysshaya Liga	–	–	2	0	–	–	–	–	2	0
Dynamo Kyiv	1989	Vysshaya Liga	27	0	5	0	5	0	–	–	37	0
Dynamo Kyiv	1990	Vysshaya Liga	12	0	2	0	2	0	–	–	16	0
Dynamo Kyiv	1991	Vysshaya Liga	28	0	2	0	9	0	–	–	39	0
Dynamo Kyiv	1992	Vyshcha Liha	13	2	3	0	–	–	–	–	16	2
Dynamo Kyiv	1992–93	Vyshcha Liha	26	3	7	1	3	0	–	–	36	4
Dynamo Kyiv	1993–94	Vyshcha Liha	34	1	4	0	2	0	–	–	40	1
Dynamo Kyiv	1994–95	Vyshcha Liha	24	4	5	0	6	0	–	–	35	4
Dynamo Kyiv	1995–96	Vyshcha Liha	24	1	5	0	1	0	–	–	30	1
Dynamo Kyiv	1996–97	Vyshcha Liha	28	2	1	0	2	0	–	–	31	2
Dynamo Kyiv	1997–98	Vyshcha Liha	16	0	4	0	9	0	–	–	29	0
Dynamo Kyiv	1998–99	Vyshcha Liha	21	0	3	0	13	0	–	–	37	0
Dynamo Kyiv	Total		253	13	43	1	52	0	0	0	348	14
Arsenal	1999–2000	Premier League	21	0	1	0	6	0	3	0	31	0
Arsenal	2000–01	Premier League	19	0	2	0	8	0	–	–	29	0
Arsenal	2001–02	Premier League	18	0	4	0	3	0	1	0	26	0
Arsenal	2002–03	Premier League	17	0	2	0	4	0	1	0	24	0
Arsenal	Total		75	0	9	0	21	0	5	0	110	0
Wolverhampton Wanderers	2003–04	Premier League	6	0	2	0	–	–	2	0	10	0
FK Venta	2005	Virsliga	9	0	–	–	–	–	–	–	9	0
Career total			460	14			79	0	7	0		

=== International ===
Appearances and goals by national team and year
National team	Year	Apps	Goals
Soviet Union	1989	5	0
Soviet Union	1990	3	0
Soviet Union	Total	8	0
Ukraine	1992	1	0
Ukraine	1993	0	0
Ukraine	1994	5	0
Ukraine	1995	6	0
Ukraine	1996	4	0
Ukraine	1997	6	0
Ukraine	1998	3	0
Ukraine	1999	8	0
Ukraine	2000	5	0
Ukraine	2001	8	0
Ukraine	2002	3	0
Ukraine	2003	3	0
Ukraine	Total	52	0
Career total		60	0

== Honours ==
Dynamo

- Soviet Top League / Ukrainian Top League: 1990, 1992–93, 1993–94, 1994–95, 1995–96, 1996–97, 1997–98, 1998–99
- Soviet Cup / Ukrainian Cup: 1989–90, 1992–93, 1995–96, 1998–99

Arsenal

- Premier League: 2001–02
- FA Cup: 2002–03
- FA Charity/Community Shield: 1999, 2002
- UEFA Cup runner-up: 1999–2000

Individual

- Ukrainian Team of the Century (poll by Ukrainsky Futbol): 2000
