= Dmytro Chyrykal =

Ukrainian coach

Personal information
- Full name: Dmytro Valeriyovych Chyrykal
- Date of birth: 22 December 1984 (age 41)
- Place of birth: Obukhiv, Kyiv Oblast, Ukrainian SSR
- Position: Midfielder

Team information
- Current team: UCSA Tarasivka

Senior career*
Years	Team	Apps	(Gls)
2004	Master-Yunior Kyiv		
2004–2005	Heoloh Fursy		
2005	Dnipro Obukhiv		
2005–2007	Alians Kyiv		
2016–2017	Vertykal Obukhiv		
2019	Zenit Kyiv-Svyatoshino Raion		

Managerial career
- 2019–2024: Druzhba Myrivka
- 2024–2025: UCSA Tarasivka
- * Club domestic league appearances and goals

Dmytro Valeriyovych Chyrykal (Ukrainian: Дмитро Валерійович Чирикал; born 22 December 1984 in Obukhiv, near Kyiv) is a Ukrainian retired amateur footballer and manager of several professional-level clubs.

== Career ==
As a player, Chyrykal played exclusively at the regional level of his native Kyiv Oblast. His teams included those of his native Obukhiv, as well as others, including the city of Kyiv.

Chyrykal finished his playing career in 2019, and the same year was invited to manage an amateur rural team from a village of Myrivka near Kaharlyk. He delivered a performance with the team, which in 2023 became the champion of the Ukrainian Amateur Football Championship by defeating another team from Kyiv Oblast, Shturm Ivankiv, in the final. Chyrykal was honoured as the best head coach of the season.

In 2023, Druzhba Myrivka was admitted to the professional league, Druha Liha (tier 3). Druzhba Myrivka managed to place 1st and gain promotion to the higher league, but was dissolved. During the summer inter-season period (July 2024), Chyrykal was hired by another Kyiv Oblast football club UCSA Tarasivka that just gained promotion to Persha Liha (tier 2).

On 20 September 2024, Dmytro Chyrykal became one of the graduates who received a UEFA A coaching license along with such former footballers as Andriy Yarmolenko and Andriy Zaporozhan.

In April of 2025, Chyrykal was let go by UCSA.

== Honours ==
Druzhba Murivka

- Ukrainian Second League: 2023–24

Association of Amateur Football of Ukraine

- Best coach: 2022, 2023
