= Roman Machulenko =

Ukrainian footballer (born 1992)

Personal information
- Full name: Roman Ivanovych Machulenko
- Date of birth: 26 July 1992 (age 34)
- Place of birth: Boryspil, Kyiv Oblast, Ukraine
- Height: 1.82 m (5 ft 11 1/2 in)
- Position: Striker

Team information
- Current team: Druzhba Myrivka
- Number: 88

Youth career
- Youth Sportive School Kolos Boryspil

Senior career*
Years	Team	Apps	(Gls)
2009	CSKA Kyiv	2	(0)
2009	Veres Rivne	8	(0)
2010–2011	Lviv	20	(1)
2010	→ Lviv-2	4	(0)
2011–2013	Sevastopol	13	(0)
2011–2012	→ Sevastopol-2	15	(3)
2013–2014	Desna Chernihiv	35	(1)
2014–2015	Stomil Olsztyn	22	(3)
2016	Zawisza Bydgoszcz	0	(0)
2018–2019	Monolit Kozyatyn		
2016	Veleten Hlukhiv		
2019	Tsentr Sportu-Favoryt Boryspil		
2019–2020	LNZ Cherkasy		
2020–2021	Bazys Kochubiyivka		
2021–2023	Druzhba Myrivka		
2023–2024	Denhoff Denykhivka		
2024–	Druzhba Myrivka	5	(0)

International career
2010	Ukraine U19	2	(0)
- * Club domestic league appearances and goals as of 26 July 2024

Roman Machulenko (Ukrainian: Роман Іванович Мачуленко; born 26 July 1992) is a Ukrainian professional footballer who plays as a striker for Druzhba Myrivka.

Machulenko played for different Ukrainian clubs before joining Polish club Stomil Olsztyn in August 2014.
