= Mykola Tsymbal =

Ukrainian footballer and coach

Personal information
- Full name: Mykola Volodymyrovych Tsymbal
- Date of birth: 7 September 1984 (age 42)
- Place of birth: Kryvyi Rih, Ukrainian SSR
- Position: Defender

Team information
- Current team: UCSA Tarasivka (manager)

Youth career
- 1999–2003: Kryvbas Kryvyi Rih

Senior career*
Years	Team	Apps	(Gls)
2003–2005	Kryvbas Kryvyi Rih	0	(0)
2003–2004	→ Kryvbas-2 Kryvyi Rih	28	(0)
2005	→ Dnipro Cherkasy (loan)	6	(0)
2005	→ Kryvbas-2 Kryvyi Rih	5	(0)
2006–2007	Atlant Kryvyi Rih	22	(5)
2007–2009	Hirnyk Kryvyi Rih	47	(8)
2011	Kichula Kazanka		
2012–2013	Kazanka		
2013	Veteran Kryvyi Rih		
2014	Veteran-2 Kryvyi Rih		
2014–2017	Litsey Kazanka	26	(0)
2017	Siltse	6	(1)
2018–2019	Zarichchia	14	(1)
2021	Siltse		

Managerial career
- 2019–2021: Mynai (assistant)
- 2021: Mynai
- 2021: Mynai (assistant)
- 2021: Mynai (caretaker)
- 2021–2022: Mynai (U19)
- 2021–2022: Mynai (assistant)
- 2022: Mynai (analyst)
- 2022: Krasava Eny Ypsonas
- 2023–2024: UCSA Tarasivka
- 2026–: UCSA Tarasivka
- * Club domestic league appearances and goals

Mykola Volodymyrovych Tsymbal (Ukrainian: Микола Володимирович Цимбал; born 7 September 1984) is a Ukrainian football coach and former player.

== Career ==
Tsymbal started his career in his hometown playing at the Kryvbas Kryvyi Rih academy in 1999. He never appeared for the first team, however, was released in 2005 after appearing mainly for Kryvbas-2 Kryvyi Rih. After playing for a couple of seasons in amateur leagues, he joined Hirnyk Kryvyi Rih in 2007 before being released in 2009. He spent the remainder of his career bouncing between several amateur clubs in the Mykolaiv Oblast championship.

In 2019 Tsymbal was invited to FC Mynai to assist Vasyl Kobin in coaching. Following the departure of Kobin in 2021, Tsymbal was appointed the club's manager.
