= Volodymyr Bezubyak =

Ukrainian association football player

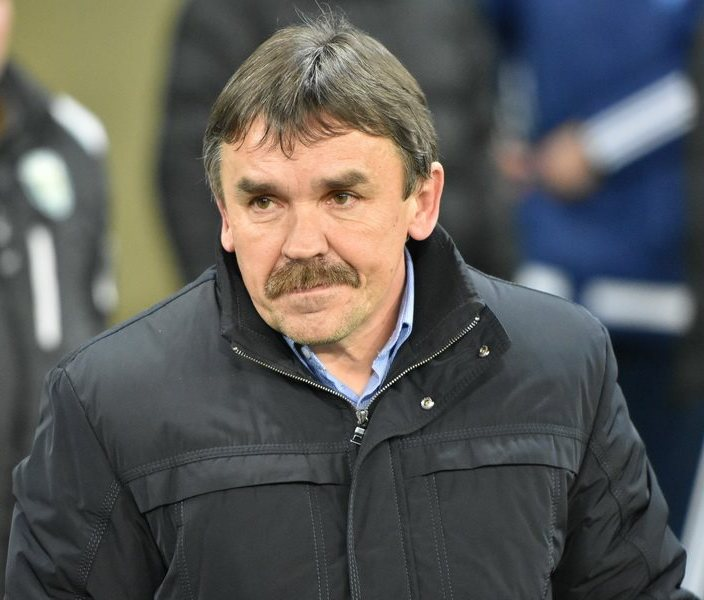

Personal information
- Full name: Volodymyr Yosypovych Bezubyak
- Date of birth: 23 March 1957 (age 69)
- Place of birth: Lviv, Ukrainian SSR
- Position: Midfielder

Youth career
- SKA Lviv sports school

Senior career*
Years	Team	Apps	(Gls)
1980–1981	FC Karpaty Lviv	5	(0)
1981	FC Podillya Khmelnytskyi	8	(0)

Managerial career
- 1982–1985: LSIPC (coach)
- 1985–1995: Karpaty Lviv (academy)
- 1995–2002: LSPC (coach)
- 2002–2004: Halychyna-Karpaty Lviv
- 2004–2005: Karpaty-2 Lviv
- 2005–2012: Karpaty Lviv (coach)
- 2012–2016: Karpaty Lviv (academy)
- 2016: Karpaty Lviv (joint with Oleh Luzhnyi)
- 2016–2017: Karpaty Lviv (academy)
- * Club domestic league appearances and goals

Volodymyr Bezubyak (Ukrainian: Володимир Йосипович Безуб'як; born 23 March 1957) is a former Ukrainian and Soviet football coach, as well as former professional midfielder, from Lviv.

== Career ==
In early 2016, he worked a senior coach performed functions of de facto senior team head coach for FC Karpaty Lviv along with Oleh Luzhnyi who was head coach de jure.
