= Pablo Castro (footballer, born 2000) =

Ukrainian footballer

Personal information
- Full name: Pablo Ramon Castro Gonzalez
- Date of birth: 7 February 2001 (age 25)
- Place of birth: Yguazu, Paraguay
- Height: 1.76 m (5 ft 9 in)
- Position: Midfielder

Team information
- Current team: UCSA Tarasivka
- Number: 73

Youth career
- –2019: Yguazu Nippon
- 2019: Athletico Paranaense

Senior career*
Years	Team	Apps	(Gls)
2019–2023	Athletico Paranaense B		
2023	União Frederiquense	16	(2)
2024–	UCSA Tarasivka	47	(11)
- * Club domestic league appearances and goals as of 4 June 2026

Pablo Ramon Castro Gonzalez (Spanish: Pablo Castro Ramon Gonzalez; born 7 February 2001) is a Paraguayan professional footballer who plays as a central midfielder for Ukrainian club UCSA Tarasivka.

A native of Paraguay, Pablo Castro joined the Brazilian top-tier club Athletico Paranaense, which in 2018 won the Copa Sudamericana. Sometime in 2019, he played for its junior squad at the Torneo di Viareggio. In 2023, he left Athletico for lesser-known regional level União Frederiquense, which plays at the state-level top-tier football league of the Rio Grande do Sul state.

In 2024, Pablo Castro decided to travel abroad, moving to Ukraine, joining the recently created UCSA Tarasivka out of the Kyiv suburbs, which recently got admitted to professional competitions. During the 2024–25 season, Castro was honored as a player of the round.

In November 2025, Pablo Castro, in an interview with sportarena.com, confirmed that he was born in Colonia Yguazú and that his first steps in football he was made in his hometown. His first coach is Fabio Raul Esteche.
