= Bohdan Kondratyuk =

Ukrainian footballer

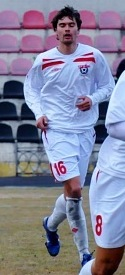
- Kondratyuk in 2011

Personal information
- Full name: Bohdan Oleksandrovych Kondratyuk
- Date of birth: 19 June 1987 (age 39)
- Place of birth: Ukrainian SSR, Soviet Union
- Height: 1.94 m (6 ft 4 in)
- Position: Centre-back

Team information
- Current team: Olimp Dmytrivka (amateurs)

Youth career
- 2001–2002: ATEK Kyiv
- 2003–2004: Omiks Kyiv

Senior career*
Years	Team	Apps	(Gls)
2005	Borysfen Boryspil	13	(0)
2006–2009	Metalurh Donetsk	1	(0)
2009–2014	Stal Alchevsk	106	(3)
2014	Poltava	0	(0)
2016	Shevchenkiv kray Horodyshche (amateurs)	3	(0)
2017	Desna Pohreby (amateurs)	10	(0)
2018–2020	LNZ-Lebedyn (amateurs)	50	(2)
2020–2021	Bazys Kochubiivka (amateurs)	15	(1)
2023–	Olimp Dmytrivka (amateurs)		

International career
2005	Ukraine U19	4	(0)

Managerial career
- 2021: Chaika Petropavlivska Borshchahivka (assistant)
- * Club domestic league appearances and goals as of 9 June 2023

Bohdan Oleksandrovych Kondratyuk (Ukrainian: Богдан Олександрович Кондратюк; born 19 June 1987) is a Ukrainian retired professional and current amateur footballer who plays as a centre-back for Olimp Dmytrivka. During his career he played for Borysfen Boryspil, Metalurh Donetsk, Stal Alchevsk, and others.

== Career ==
He is a product of Kyiv academies (YFC ATEK Kyiv). For some four seasons played for Metalurh Donetsk in reserve competitions of the UPL. After 2014 Kondratyuk has played in amateurs.
