= Nikita Petruk =

Ukrainian footballer

Personal information
- Full name: Nikita Serhiyovych Petruk
- Date of birth: 8 June 2003 (age 23)
- Place of birth: Zhytomyr, Ukraine
- Height: 1.70 m (5 ft 7 in)
- Position: Central midfielder

Team information
- Current team: Nyva Vinnytsia (on loan from UCSA Tarasivka)
- Number: 7

Youth career
- 2016–2020: UFK-Karpaty Lviv
- 2021: Polissya Zhytomyr

Senior career*
Years	Team	Apps	(Gls)
2020–2021	Rukh Lviv	0	(0)
2022	Zorya-2 Romaniv	3	(0)
2022–	Polissya Zhytomyr	8	(0)
2023–2024	→ Zviahel (loan)	15	(1)
2024–2025	Polissya Zhytomyr II	15	(0)
2025–	UCSA Tarasivka	5	(0)
2026–	→ Nyva Vinnytsia (loan)	9	(2)

International career^{‡}
2018	Ukraine U15	1	(0)
- * Club domestic league appearances and goals as of 4 June 2026 ‡ National team caps and goals as of 21 October 2022

Nikita Serhiyovych Petruk (Ukrainian: Нікіта Сергійович Петрук; born 8 June 2003) is a Ukrainian professional footballer who plays as a central midfielder for Nyva Vinnytsia, on loan from Ukrainian First League club UCSA Tarasivka.
