= Mykyta Sytnykov =

Ukrainian footballer

Personal information
- Full name: Mykyta Olehovych Sytnykov
- Date of birth: 23 June 2004 (age 22)
- Place of birth: Dnipropetrovsk, Ukraine
- Height: 1.86 m (6 ft 1 in)
- Position: Central midfielder

Team information
- Current team: UCSA Tarasivka
- Number: 7

Youth career
- 2014–2016: Lider Dnipro
- 2016–2017: AFK Dnipro-2004
- 2017–2018: Dnipro
- 2018–2021: DVUFK Dnipro
- 2022: → Legia Warsaw (loan)

Senior career*
Years	Team	Apps	(Gls)
2021–2023	Oleksandriya	0	(0)
2023–2024	Chornomorets Odesa	0	(0)
2024–	UCSA Tarasivka	44	(10)

International career^{‡}
2020	Ukraine U16	4	(0)
- * Club domestic league appearances and goals as of 4 June 2026 ‡ National team caps and goals as of 27 October 2021

Mykyta Olehovych Sytnykov (Ukrainian: Микита Олегович Ситников; born 23 June 2004) is a Ukrainian professional footballer who plays as central midfielder for UCSA Tarasivka.

== Career ==
Born in Dnipro, Sytnykov is a product of different local academies.

In January 2021 he signed a contract with the Ukrainian Premier League club Oleksandriya. He made his debut on 26 October 2021, coming on as a substitute in a win against Metalist 1925 Kharkiv in the Round of 16 of the Ukrainian Cup.
