= Kyrylo Khovayko =

Ukrainian footballer

Personal information
- Full name: Kyrylo Yuriyovych Khovayko
- Date of birth: 17 June 2001 (age 25)
- Place of birth: Dniprodzerzhynsk, Dnipropetrovsk Oblast, Ukraine
- Height: 1.78 m (5 ft 10 in)
- Position: Midfielder

Team information
- Current team: Uzhhorod (on loan from FC UCSA Tarasivka)
- Number: 77

Youth career
- 2014–2015: Inter Dnipropetrovsk
- 2015–2018: Dnipro

Senior career*
Years	Team	Apps	(Gls)
2018–2022	SC Dnipro-1	1	(0)
2023–2024	FC UCSA Tarasivka	25	(3)
2025	FC Standart Novi Sanzhary	6	(2)
2025–	FC UCSA Tarasivka	2	(0)
2026–	→ Uzhhorod (loan)	10	(4)
- * Club domestic league appearances and goals as of 4 June 2026

Kyrylo Yuriyovych Khovayko (Ukrainian: Кирило Юрійович Ховайко; born 17 June 2001) is a professional Ukrainian football midfielder who plays for Uzhhorod, on loan from FC UCSA Tarasivka.

== Career ==
Khovayko is a product of the Inter and the Dnipro youth sportive schools in his native Dnipropetrovsk Oblast and in July 2018 he signed a contract with Ukrainian side SC Dnipro-1, that was promoted to the Ukrainian First League in this time.

In December 2020 he was promoted to the main squad to play in the Ukrainian Premier League. Khovayko made his debut in the Ukrainian Premier League for SC Dnipro-1 as a second-half substituted player on 6 December 2020, playing in a losing away match against FC Zorya Luhansk.
