= Denys Ndukve =

Ukrainian footballer

Personal information
- Full name: Denys Obiyeze Ndukve
- Date of birth: 28 February 2000 (age 26)
- Place of birth: Kharkiv, Ukraine
- Height: 1.80 m (5 ft 11 in)
- Position: Centre-forward

Team information
- Current team: Veres Rivne on loan from Vorskla Poltava
- Number: 30

Youth career
- 2013–2014: KhTZ-2 Kharkiv
- 2014: Metalurh Donetsk
- 2015: Arsenal Kharkiv
- 2015: → Arsenal-2 Kharkiv
- 2015–2016: KDYuSSh-7 Kharkiv
- 2016: Arsenal-2 Kharkiv
- 2016: Arsenal Kharkiv
- 2019: Arena Kharkiv
- 2019: Avanhard Kharkiv

Senior career*
Years	Team	Apps	(Gls)
2017	Zmiiv	2	(2)
2018	Metalist Yunior	27	(8)
2019	Arena Kharkiv	3	(1)
2020	MSM Academy Prague	3	(2)
2020	Avanhard Kharkiv	4	(2)
2020–2022	Metalist 1925 Kharkiv	4	(0)
2021	→ Kramatorsk (loan)	12	(1)
2022–2023	SC Chaika	17	(4)
2023–2024	Zviahel	16	(15)
2024	Polissya Zhytomyr	10	(1)
2024–	Vorskla Poltava	28	(4)
2024	→ Vorskla-2 Poltava	3	(1)
2025–26	→ Veres Rivne (loan)	20	(5)
2026-	FC Kolos Kovalivka	7	(2)
- * Club domestic league appearances and goals as of 28/9/26 @ 14:40(AEST)

Denys Obiyeze Ndukve (Ukrainian: Денис Обієзе Ндукве; born 28 February 2000) is a Ukrainian professional footballer who plays as a centre-forward for Ukrainian club Veres Rivne on loan from Vorskla Poltava.

== Personal life ==
He was born to a Nigerian father and Ukrainian mother.
