= 2022–23 Ukrainian Amateur Cup =

2022-23 Ukrainian Cup for amateur teams
Tournament details
- Country: Ukraine
- Dates: 9 November 2022 – 31 May 2023
- Teams: 16

Final positions
- Champions: Druzhba Myrivka
- Runners-up: Olimpiya Savyntsi
- Ukrainian Cup: FC Mykolaiv; Olympiya Savyntsi; Shturm Ivankiv; Fazenda Chernivtsi

The 2022–23 Ukrainian Amateur Cup was the 27th season of the national football cup competition for amateur teams, which started on 9 November 2022. Originally, it was scheduled to start earlier in September with its pool of participants still being not fully determined until November due to war conditions.

Due to the full-scale Russian invasion, the previous season competition was interrupted and abandoned at quarterfinals, so no winner was determined.

== Participated clubs ==
In bold are clubs that were active at the same season AAFU championship (parallel round-robin competition).

- Chernivtsi Oblast (2): Fazenda Chernivtsi, FC Voloka
- Dnipropetrovsk Oblast (1): Penuel Kryvyi Rih
- Ivano-Frankivsk Oblast (1): **Varatyk Kolomyia**
- Khmelnytskyi Oblast (1): Iskra Teofipol
- Kirovohrad Oblast (1): **Zirka Kropyvnytskyi**
- Kyiv Oblast (5): **Druzhba Myrivka**, **Lokomotyv Kyiv**, **Shturm Ivankiv**, Tytan Kyiv, UCSA Tarasivka
- Lviv Oblast (1): **Skala 1911 Stryi**
- Poltava Oblast (1): **Olimpiya Savyntsi**
- Ternopil Oblast (1): **Ahron Velyki Hayi**
- Zaporizhzhia Oblast (1): **Motor Zaporizhia**
- Zhytomyr Oblast (1): Polissia Stavky

Notes

- Last season UCSA Tarasivka competed as UCSA Kyiv.

== Bracket ==
The following is the bracket that demonstrates the last four rounds of the Ukrainian Cup, including the final match. Numbers in parentheses next to the match score represent the results of a penalty shoot-out.

Round of 16
**FC Voloka**	**6**	**3**	**9**
Varatyk Kolomyia	0	2	2
Ahron Velyki Hayi	0	**3**	3
**Fazenda Chernivtsi**	**4**	0	**4**
**Skala 1911 Stryi**	**4**	**3**	**7**
Iskra Teofipol	0	2	2
**Druzhba Myrivka**	1	**2**	**3**
Polissia Stavky	1	0	1
**Shturm Ivankiv**	**6**	**2**	**8**
Tytan Kyiv	1	1	2
UCSA Tarasivka	0	1	1
**Lokomotyv Kyiv**	**3**	**4**	**7**
**Olimpiya Savyntsi**	**6**	0	**6**
Penuel Kryvyi Rih	0	0	0
**Motor Zaporizhia**	**1**	**2**	**3**
Zirka Kropyvnytskyi	0	0	0

Quarter-finals
**Fazenda Chernivtsi**	**2**	**3**	**5**
FC Voloka	1	1	2
Skala 1911 Stryi	1	0	1
**Druzhba Myrivka**	**2**	**3**	**5**
**Shturm Ivankiv**	**4**	**3**	**7**
Lokomotyv Kyiv	0	1	1
**Motor Zaporizhia**	**1**	-	-
**Olimpiya Savyntsi**	0	+	+

Semi-finals
**Druzhba Myrivka**	**4**	**4**	**8**
Fazenda Chernivtsi	0	0	0
Shturm Ivankiv	1	0	1
**Olimpiya Savyntsi** (a)	1	0	**1**

Final
Olimpiya Savyntsi	0	1	1
**Druzhba Myrivka**	**1**	1	**2**

== Results ==
=== Round of 16 ===
Many first leg matches were played on 9 November, while two more hosted by Voloka and Shturm were moved to 10 November. Second leg is scheduled on 16 November with the match involving Shturm on 17 November.

Team 1	Agg.	Team 2	1st leg	2nd leg
First leg – 9 November, Second leg – 16 November
Ahron Velyki Hayi	3 – 4	**Fazenda Chernivtsi**	0–4	3–0
**Skala 1911 Stryi**	7 – 2	Iskra Teofipol	4–0	3–2
**Druzhba Myrivka**	3 – 1	Polissia Stavky	1–1	2–0
UCSA Tarasivka	1 – 7	**Lokomotyv Kyiv**	0–3	1–4
**Motor Zaporizhia**	3 – 0	Zirka Kropyvnytskyi	1–0	2–0
**Olimpiya Savyntsi**	6 – 0	Penuel Kryvyi Rih	6–0	0–0
First leg – 10 November, Second leg – 16 November
**Voloka**	9 – 2	Varatyk Kolomyia	6–0	3–2
First leg – 10 November, Second leg – 17 November
**Shturm Ivankiv**	8 – 2	Tytan Kyiv	6–1	2–1

=== Quarterfinals ===
First leg games were played on 23 November, second leg games on 30 November. Due to mass rocket strike by the Russian Federation on 23 November, matches of the first leg were postponed. The 2nd game between Olimpiya and Motor was postponed to the next year.

Team 1	Agg.	Team 2	1st leg	2nd leg
First leg – 24 November, Second leg – 30 November
**Fazenda Chernivtsi**	5 – 2	Voloka	2–1	3–1
Skala 1911 Stryi	1 – 5	**Druzhba Myrivka**	1–2	0–3
First leg – 30 November, Second leg – 7 December
Motor Zaporizhia	w/o	**Olimpiya Savyntsi**	1–0	–
First leg – 1 December, Second leg – 7 December
**Shturm Ivankiv**	7 – 1	Lokomotyv Kyiv	4–0	3–1

Notes:

- 13 February 2023 Motor Zaporizhia was withdrawn from the competition.

=== Semifinals ===
First leg games were scheduled to play on 5 April, second leg games on 12 April.

Team 1	Agg.	Team 2	1st leg	2nd leg
**Druzhba Myrivka**	8–0	Fazenda Chernivtsi	4–0	4–0
Shturm Ivankiv	1–1 (a)	**Olimpiya Savyntsi**	1–1	0–0

=== Final ===
First leg game was scheduled to play on 24 May, second leg game on 31 May.

Team 1	Agg.	Team 2	1st leg	2nd leg
Olimpiya Savyntsi	1–2	**Druzhba Myrivka**	0–1	1–1

Winner of the 2022–23 Ukrainian Football Cup among amateur teams
**Druzhba Myrivka (Kyiv Oblast)**; **1st time**

== See also ==
- 2022–23 Ukrainian Football Amateur League
