= 2022–23 Football Championship of Kyiv Oblast =

Football Championship of Kyiv Oblast
- Season: 2022–23

The 2022–23 Football Championship of Kyiv Oblast was the 88th season in the top regional football competition of Kyiv Oblast.

== League table ==
| Pos | Team | Pld | W | D | L | GF | GA | GD | Pts |
|---|---|---|---|---|---|---|---|---|---|
| 1 | Druzhba Myrivka | 18 | 16 | 1 | 1 | 53 | 9 | +44 | 49 |
| 2 | Shturm Ivankiv | 18 | 15 | 1 | 2 | 57 | 3 | +54 | 46 |
| 3 | PolissYa Stavky | 18 | 12 | 2 | 4 | 41 | 17 | +24 | 38 |
| 4 | Denhoff Denykhivka | 18 | 12 | 2 | 4 | 45 | 22 | +23 | 38 |
| 5 | Sokil Mykhaylivka-Rubezhivka | 18 | 10 | 1 | 7 | 31 | 26 | +5 | 31 |
| 6 | Bavaria Kozhanka | 18 | 9 | 3 | 6 | 50 | 26 | +24 | 30 |
| 7 | Arsenal Kyiv | 18 | 6 | 1 | 11 | 25 | 35 | −10 | 19 |
| 8 | Hatne | 18 | 6 | 1 | 11 | 28 | 47 | −19 | 19 |
| 9 | Bilhorod Bilhorodka | 18 | 5 | 2 | 11 | 22 | 34 | −12 | 17 |
| 10 | Partyzan Kodra | 18 | 5 | 1 | 12 | 23 | 36 | −13 | 16 |
| 11 | Zorya Myronivshchyny Myronivka | 18 | 3 | 2 | 13 | 18 | 59 | −41 | 11 |
| 12 | Nika U-19 Kyiv | 18 | 0 | 1 | 17 | 9 | 88 | −79 | 1 |

Updated to match(es) played on 29 April 2023. Source:
