= Ivan Stankovych =

Ukrainian footballer

Personal information
- Full name: Ivan Ivanovych Stankovych
- Date of birth: 7 February 2002 (age 24)
- Place of birth: Svaliava, Ukraine
- Height: 1.70 m (5 ft 7 in)
- Position: Left midfielder

Team information
- Current team: Kulykiv-Bilka
- Number: 99

Youth career
- 2015–2016: Munkach Mukachevo
- 2016: Polyana
- 2016–2019: Munkach Mukachevo

Senior career*
Years	Team	Apps	(Gls)
2019–2021	Munkach Mukachevo	27	(8)
2021–2025	Mynai	0	(0)
2022	→ Uzhhorod (loan)	0	(0)
2022–2024	→ Khust (loan)	42	(4)
2024–2025	→ Ahrobiznes Volochysk (loan)	14	(1)
2025–	Kulykiv-Bilka	20	(2)
- * Club domestic league appearances and goals as of 4 June 2026

Ivan Ivanovych Stankovych (Ukrainian: Іван Іванович Станкович; born 7 February 2002) is a Ukrainian professional footballer who plays as a left midfielder for Ukrainian Second League club Kulykiv-Bilka.

== Career ==
In 2022 he was loanded to Uzhhorod without playing. Few months later he moved on loan to Khust, where on 11 September 2023, he made his debut in Ukrainian First League against Nyva Buzova. In summer 2025 he moved to Kulykiv-Bilka in Ukrainian Second League.
