= FC Druzhba Myrivka =

Druzhba Myrivka
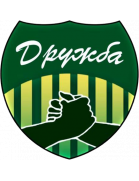
- Full name: Football Club Druzhba Myrivka
- Founded: 1961; 65 years ago 2019; 7 years ago refounded
- Dissolved: 1990s 2024
- Ground: Kolos Stadium, Kaharlyk
- Capacity: 2,100
- Chairman: Oleksandr Onyshchenko
- Manager: Dmytro Chyrykal
- League: Ukrainian Second League
- 2022–23: Ukrainian Amateur League, Group 2, 1st of 8 (promoted)
- Website: https://pfcdruzhba.com.ua/

Football Club Druzhba Myrivka (Ukrainian: Футбольний клуб «Дружба») is a Ukrainian football club from the village of Myrivka, Kaharlyk urban community. The team currently play in the Ukrainian Second League, the Ukrainian third tier of football league.

== History ==
The team was founded in 1961 as a football team of the local collective farm "Druzhba". Until 2020 the club competed at a district level of Kaharlyk Raion and in 1990s became defunct. It was revived in 2019 by Oleksandr Onyshchenko who is a native of Myrivka and a leader of the All-Ukrainian Security Holdings.

In 2020 it debuted at regional level of Kyiv Oblast. In 2021 "Druzhba" finally debuted at national level of the Ukrainian Football Amateur Association in cup competitions.

== Honours ==
- Ukrainian Second League
  - Winners (1): 2023–24
- Ukrainian Football Amateur League
  - Winners (1): 2022–23
- Ukrainian Amateur Cup
  - Winners (1): 2022–23
- Kyiv Oblast Football Championship:
  - Winners (1): 2022–23
- Football Cup of Kyiv Oblast
  - Finalist (1): 2021

== League and cup history ==
Season	Div.	Pos.	Pl.	W	D	L	GS	GA	P	Domestic Cup	Europe	Notes
2022–23	3rd "A"	1/8	14	10	3	1	24	7	33			Admitted to SL
2023–24	3rd "A"	1/15	26	19	5	2	50	13	62	1/64 finals		Withdrew

== Players ==
=== Current squad ===
As of 8 May 2024

Note: Flags indicate national team as defined under FIFA eligibility rules; some limited exceptions apply. Players may hold more than one non-FIFA nationality.

No.	Pos.	Nation	Player
1	GK	UKR	Maksym Babiychuk
3	DF	UKR	Serhii Paliukh
4	DF	UKR	Andrii Dediaiev
6	DF	UKR	Maksym Kuba (captain)
7	MF	UKR	Artem Nedolya
8	MF	UKR	Volodymyr Doronin
9	FW	UKR	Danylo Kolesnyk
10	MF	UKR	Maksym Holovko
11	FW	UKR	Ivan Somov
13	DF	UKR	Artem Kozlov
17	DF	UKR	Ihor Yurechko
18	DF	UKR	Vladyslav Yuzefovych
19	DF	UKR	Vladyslav Shkinder

No.	Pos.	Nation	Player
20	MF	UKR	Maksym Kazakov
21	MF	UKR	Danylo Yaniuk
22	MF	UKR	Andriy Porokhnya
24	DF	UKR	Oleksiy Zozulya
27	FW	UKR	Artem Hryshchenko
29	MF	UKR	Andrii Starochous
31	GK	UKR	Oleksii Drui
35	GK	UKR	Maksym Tatarenko
47	MF	UKR	Pavlo Zamurenko
70	MF	UKR	Oleh Vakulenko
77	MF	UKR	Oleksii Badurin
88	MF	UKR	Roman Machulenko
