= Dmytro Makhnyev =

Ukrainian footballer (born 1996)

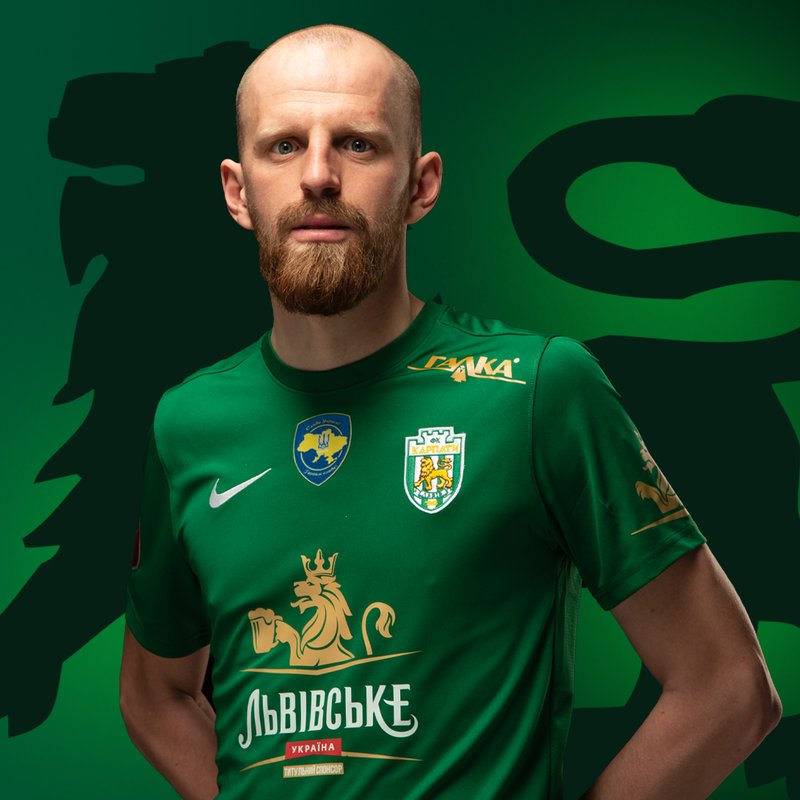

Personal information
- Full name: Dmytro Vitaliyovych Makhnyev
- Date of birth: 2 March 1996 (age 30)
- Place of birth: Dnipropetrovsk, Ukraine
- Height: 1.94 m (6 ft 4 in)
- Position: Centre-back

Youth career
- 2007: Dnipro-75 Dnipropetrovsk
- 2007–2010: Dnipro Dnipropetrovsk
- 2010–2011: Inter Dnipropetrovsk
- 2011–2013: Dnipro Dnipropetrovsk

Senior career*
Years	Team	Apps	(Gls)
2013–2014	Sevastopol	0	(0)
2014	Hoverla Uzhhorod	0	(0)
2015	Stal-2 Dniprodzerzhynsk	7	(0)
2015	Daugavpils	8	(0)
2016	Petrykivka	5	(1)
2016–2017	Nikopol-NPHU	29	(8)
2017–2020	Enerhiya Nova Kakhovka	75	(18)
2020–2022	Veres Rivne	17	(0)
2022–2023	Karpaty Lviv	16	(1)
2023–2024	UCSA Tarasivka	37	(5)
2025	FSC Mariupol	7	(0)
- * Club domestic league appearances and goals as of 10 June 2025

Dmytro Vitaliyovych Makhnyev (Ukrainian: Дмитро Віталійович Махнєв; born 2 March 1996) is a Ukrainian professional footballer who plays as a centre-back.

== Early life ==
Makhnyev was born in Dnipropetrovsk.

== Career ==
In summer 2022, he moved to Karpaty Lviv as a center-back.
