= FC UCSA Tarasivka =

UCSA Tarasivka
- Full name: Football Club U.C.S.A
- Founded: 2017; 9 years ago
- Ground: Bannikov Stadium, Kyiv; Stadion Yuvileinyi, Bucha
- Chairman: Serhiy Lesnik
- Manager: Anderson Ribeiro
- League: Ukrainian First League
- 2024–25: 8th
- Website: https://ucsa.com.ua/eng

Football Club UCSA (Ukrainian: Футбольний клуб ЮКСА) is a Ukrainian professional football team from Tarasivka (Boiarka hromada), Ukraine. UCSA is an abbreviation for Ukrainian Christian Sport Academy. The club's training base and main office is located in the village of Tarasivka near the city of Boyarka. The club currently plays in Ukrainian First League, the Ukrainian second tier of football league.

== History ==
The academy was established by Serhiy Lesnyk in 2015. According to sport director Muzafardjon Rakhmanov who gave an interview to Sport Arena, the football club was actually established in October 2017.

The club has some international support in face of Brazilian coaches who work in the club.

In 2023, the football team of UCSA debuted at professional level with Bannikov Stadium in Kyiv as its home turf.

== Players ==
As of 10 September 2026 Professional Football League (team roster)
Note: Flags indicate national team as defined under FIFA eligibility rules; some limited exceptions apply. Players may hold more than one non-FIFA nationality.

No.	Pos.	Nation	Player
1	GK	UKR	Oleksandr Postemskyi
4	DF	UKR	Pavlo Zakhidnyi
6	MF	UKR	Roman Yuvkhymets
7	MF	UKR	Mykyta Sytnykov
8	MF	UKR	Andriy Kireyev
9	FW	UKR	Oleksiy Khoblenko
10	MF	BRA	Matheus Pagliarini
11	MF	UKR	Antoniy Emere
12	GK	UKR	Artem Kovalyov
15	DF	UKR	Oleksandr Osman
17	MF	UKR	Oleksandr Sklyar
20	FW	UKR	Maksym Andrushchenko
21	DF	UKR	Oleksandr Dvorovenko
23	DF	UKR	Mykhaylo Shershen

No.	Pos.	Nation	Player
28	MF	UKR	Oleksii Zhdanovych
31	GK	UKR	Vadym Yushchyshyn
32	MF	UKR	Serhiy Petko
42	DF	UKR	Dmytro Makhnyev
45	DF	UKR	Dmytro Sabiyev
49	MF	BRA	Vitinho
70	MF	UKR	Dmitriy Irodovskyi
73	MF	PAR	Pablo Castro
77	MF	GEO	Ivane Potskhveria
87	FW	UKR	Vladyslav Voytsekhovskyi
97	DF	UKR	Oleksandr Shevchuk
—	DF	BRA	Hiago Cena
—	FW	BRA	Gabriel Goulart

=== Out on loan ===
Note: Flags indicate national team as defined under FIFA eligibility rules; some limited exceptions apply. Players may hold more than one non-FIFA nationality.

No.	Pos.	Nation	Player
19	FW	UKR	Matviy Zherebetskyi (at Carbon Cherkasy until 30 June 2027)
22	MF	UKR	Nikita Petruk (at Nyva Vinnytsia until 30 June 2027)

No.	Pos.	Nation	Player
38	FW	UKR	Mykyta Nemetskov (at Nyva Vinnytsia until 30 June 2027)
41	MF	BRA	Icaro Mendes (at Nyva Vinnytsia until 31 December 2026)

== League and cup history ==
Season	Div.	Pos.	Pl.	W	D	L	GS	GA	P	Domestic Cup	Europe		Notes
2021–22	4th "2" (Amateur League)	8_{/10}	9	1	1	7	9	20	4	-	-	-	-
2023–24	3rd(Second League)	2	26	19	5	2	62	13	62	-	-	-	Promotional play-off:Metalurh Zaporizhzhia 3:1 4:0 (7-1) Promoted to Ukrainian First League
2024–25	2nd(Persha Liha "B")	4/9	16	8	4	4	31	21	28	1/8 finals	-	-	Admitted to Promotion Group
2024–25	2nd(Persha Liha "PRO")	8/8	22	7	6	9	33	35	27	1/8 finals	-	-	-
2025–26	2nd(Persha Liha)	11/16	30	10	6	14	30	40	36	1/32 finals	-	-	-
2026–27	2nd(Persha Liha)	6/16	4	1	3	0	7	6	6	1/32 finals	-	-	TBD

== Head coaches ==
- 2021 – 2022 Andriy Petrenko
- 2023 – 2024 Mykola Tsymbal
- 2024 – 2025 Dmytro Chyrykal
- 2025 – 2026 (Brazil) Anderson Ribeiro
- 2026 – present Mykola Tsymbal
