= 2024–25 Ukrainian Premier League =

34th season of top-tier football league in Ukrainian football

Ukrainian Premier League VBET
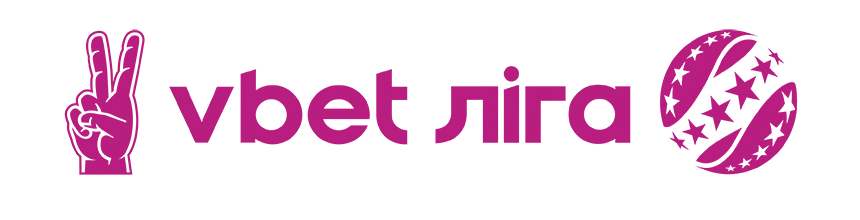
- Official logo
- Season: 2024–25
- Dates: 3 August 2024 – 25 May 2025; 17 December 2024 – 21 February 2025 (winter break)
- Champions: Dynamo Kyiv (17th title)
- Relegated: Chornomorets Odesa; Inhulets Petrove; Livyi Bereh Kyiv; Vorskla Poltava
- Champions League: Dynamo Kyiv
- Europa League: Shakhtar Donetsk
- Conference League: Oleksandriya; Polissya Zhytomyr
- Matches: 240
- Goals: 544 (2.27 per match)
- Top goalscorer: Vladyslav Vanat (Dynamo) (17 goals)
- Biggest home win: Shakhtar 6–0 Inhulets (23 November 2024)
- Biggest away win: Vorskla 0–5 Shakhtar (4 August 2024)
- Highest scoring: Oleksandriya 4–3 Shakhtar (24 August 2024); Shakhtar 5–2 Karpaty (14 September 2024); Dynamo 5–2 Inhulets (3 November 2024)
- Longest winning run: 5 matches Dynamo
- Longest unbeaten run: 30 matches Dynamo
- Longest winless run: 14 matches Inhulets
- Longest losing run: 7 matches Chornomorets
- Highest attendance: 6,500; Karpaty 1–3 Zorya (25 May 2025)
- Lowest attendance: 0; 12 matches
- Total attendance: 234,284
- Average attendance: 1,090
- All statistics correct as of 25 May 2025.

The 2024–25 Ukrainian Premier League season, referred to as the Ukrainian Premier League VBET for sponsorship reasons, was the 34th top-level football club competition since the fall of the Soviet Union and the 17th since the establishment of the Ukrainian Premier League (UPL). The competition took place during the ongoing war with the Russia since late February 2022.

Shakhtar Donetsk entered the season as the defending champions and the leading club in the last three seasons. Shakhtar were "dethroned" by Dynamo, which finished the season with no losses for the first time since the 2014–15 season.

The season started earlier than expected due to the sudden withdrawal of SC Dnipro-1, which forced the UPL to organize a mini-tournament of four teams for the extra spot in late July. The tournament included teams that were relegated to the second tier and those that lost promotion/relegation play-offs. Due to the withdrawal of SC Dnipro-1, Ukraine's spot for the club was forfeited at the 2024–25 continental competitions.

The season kicked off on 3 August 2024, with games in Rivne and Kryvyi Rih. With the ongoing Russian invasion of Ukraine, the league's fixtures are being suspended or postponed due to anti-strike air sirens.

== Teams ==
This season the Ukrainian Premier League remained at 16 teams.

=== Promoted teams ===
- Inhulets Petrove – first-placed team of the 2023–24 Ukrainian First League (returning after a season)
- Karpaty Lviv – second-placed team of the 2023–24 Ukrainian First League (returning, last competed in 2019–20, for the first time since its reorganization in 2020)
- Livyi Bereh Kyiv – winner of pre-season Mini-tournament. Third-placed team of the 2023–24 Ukrainian First League (debut)

=== Relegated teams ===
- FC Mynai – relegated after four seasons in the top flight.
- Metalist 1925 Kharkiv – relegated after three seasons in the top flight.

=== Withdrawn teams ===
- Dnipro-1 - Prior to season starting

=== Location map ===
Home venues of teams in the 2024–25 Ukrainian Premier League.
Several teams (Zorya and Shakhtar) are playing their home games in different cities due to ongoing hostilities.

=== Stadiums ===
The minimum threshold for the stadium's capacity in the UPL is 4,500 (Article 10, paragraph 8.3).

The following stadiums are regarded as home grounds:

Rank	Stadium	Place	Club	Capacity	Notes
1	Arena Lviv	Lviv	Rukh Lviv	34,725	
1	Arena Lviv	Lviv	Shakhtar Donetsk	34,725	used as home ground in 14 matches
1	Arena Lviv	Lviv	Inhulets Petrove	34,725	used as home ground in 1 match
2	Chornomorets Stadium	Odesa	Chornomorets Odesa	34,164	
2	Chornomorets Stadium	Odesa	Inhulets Petrove	34,164	used as home ground in 1 match
3	Ukraina Stadium	Lviv	Karpaty Lviv	28,051	
3	Ukraina Stadium	Lviv	Inhulets Petrove	28,051	used as home ground in 1 match
4	Butovsky Vorskla Stadium	Poltava	Vorskla Poltava	23,842	
5	Lobanovskyi Dynamo Stadium	Kyiv	Dynamo Kyiv	16,873	
5	Lobanovskyi Dynamo Stadium	Kyiv	Vorskla Poltava	16,873	used as home ground in 1 match
5	Lobanovskyi Dynamo Stadium	Kyiv	Zorya Luhansk	16,873	used as home ground during the season
6	Tsentralnyi Stadion	Cherkasy	LNZ Cherkasy	10,321	
7	Avanhard Stadium	Rivne	Veres Rivne	7,122	
7	Avanhard Stadium	Rivne	Kryvbas Kryvyi Rih	7,122	used as home ground in 1 match
8	CSC Nika Stadium	Oleksandriya	FC Oleksandriya	7,000	
8	CSC Nika Stadium	Oleksandriya	Inhulets Petrove	7,000	used as home ground in 7 matches (Note: The match of 16th matchday between Inhulets Petrove and Zorya Luhansk was started on 8 December 2024 at the stadium Hirnyk in Kryvyi Rih, Dnipropetrovsk region)
9	Tsentralnyi Stadion	Zhytomyr	Polissya Zhytomyr	5,928	
9	Tsentralnyi Stadion	Zhytomyr	Inhulets Petrove	5,928	used as home ground in 1 match
9	Tsentralnyi Stadion	Zhytomyr	Karpaty Lviv	5,928	used as home ground in 1 match
10	Obolon Arena	Kyiv	Obolon Kyiv	5,103	
10	Obolon Arena	Kyiv	Inhulets Petrove	5,103	used as home ground in 1 match
11	Kolos Stadium	Kovalivka	Kolos Kovalivka	5,050	
11	Kolos Stadium	Kovalivka	LNZ Cherkasy	5,050	used as home ground in 1 match
11	Kolos Stadium	Kovalivka	Inhulets Petrove	5,050	used as home ground in 1 match
12	Arena Livyi Bereh	Zolochivska hromada	Livyi Bereh Kyiv	4,700	
12	Arena Livyi Bereh	Zolochivska hromada	Shakhtar Donetsk	4,700	used as home ground in 2 matches
13	Hirnyk Stadium	Kryvyi Rih	Kryvbas Kryvyi Rih	3,219	
13	Hirnyk Stadium	Kryvyi Rih	Inhulets Petrove	3,219	used as home ground in 2 matches (Note: The match of 16th matchday between Inhulets Petrove and Zorya Luhansk was resumed after air alerts on 30 April 2025, at the CSC Nika Stadium in Oleksandria, Kirovohrad region)
14	Berezkin Zirka Stadium	Kropyvnytskyi	None (Note: The stadium was announced as the home ground of the Inhulets Petrove in the 2nd part of the season 2024-25, but the club decided to held home matches at the CSC Nika Stadium in Oleksandria)	13,305	

=== Personnel and sponsorship ===
Team	President	Head coach	Captain	Kit manufacturer	Shirt sponsor
Chornomorets Odesa	Leonid Klimov	(Ukraine) Oleksandr Kucher	(Ukraine) Bohdan Butko	Kelme	Vbet
Dynamo Kyiv	Ihor Surkis	(Ukraine) Oleksandr Shovkovskyi	(Ukraine) Vitaliy Buyalskyi	New Balance	A-Bank
Inhulets Petrove	Oleksandr Povoroznyuk	(Ukraine) Vasyl Kobin	(Ukraine) Oleksiy Palamarchuk	Joma (Note: Given the fact that the company continues to cooperate with Russian clubs, the logo of Joma on the game uniform is disguised by the logo of another sponsor of the club)	П'ятихатська
Karpaty Lviv	Volodymyr Matkivskyi	(Ukraine) Vladyslav Lupashko	(Ukraine) Denys Miroshnichenko	Nike	Lvivske
Kolos Kovalivka	Andriy Zasukha	(Ukraine) Ruslan Kostyshyn (interim)	(Ukraine) Valeriy Bondarenko	Nike	Vbet
Kryvbas Kryvyi Rih	Kostyantyn Karamanits	(Ukraine) Yuriy Vernydub	(Ukraine) Dmytro Khomchenovskyi	SKIDAN	Rudomain
Livyi Bereh Kyiv	Mykola Lavrenko	(Ukraine) Vitaliy Pervak	(Ukraine) Ruslan Dedukh	Nike	″Metalo Galva″
LNZ Cherkasy	Viktor Kravchenko	(Ukraine) Roman Hryhorchuk	(Luxembourg) Olivier Thill	Macron	Vbet
Obolon Kyiv	Oleksandr Slobodian	(Ukraine) Serhiy Shyshchenko	(Ukraine) Nazariy Fedorivskyi	Jako	FavBet & Obolon
Oleksandriya	Serhiy Kuzmenko	(Ukraine) Ruslan Rotan	(Ukraine) Kyrylo Kovalets	Nike	AgroVista
Polissya Zhytomyr	Hennadiy Butkevych	(Ukraine) Oleksandr Maksymov (caretaker)	(Ukraine) Ruslan Babenko	Nike	BGV Group
Rukh Lviv	Hryhoriy Kozlovskyi	(Ukraine) Vitaliy Ponomaryov	(Ukraine) Marko Sapuha	Macron	Emily Resort, Favbet (Note: Since 27th matchweek)
Shakhtar Donetsk	Rinat Akhmetov	(Netherlands) Marino Pušić	(Ukraine) Mykola Matviyenko	Puma	FavBet
Veres Rivne	Ivan Nadieyin	(Ukraine) Oleh Shandruk	(Ukraine) Bohdan Kohut	Kelme	Vbet
Vorskla Poltava	Kostyantyn Zhevago	(Ukraine) Yuriy Maksymov	(Ukraine) Ihor Perduta	Nike	Ferrexpo
Zorya Luhansk	Yevhen Heller	(Croatia) Mladen Bartulović (interim)	(Ukraine) Pylyp Budkivskyi	Puma	GG.BET (Note: Since 14th matchweek)

=== Managerial changes ===
Team	Outgoing manager	Manner of departure	Date of vacancy	Table	Incoming manager	Date of appointment
Polissya Zhytomyr	(Ukraine) Serhiy Shyshchenko (caretaker)	End of caretaker	26 May 2024	Pre-season	(Ukraine) Imad Ashur	26 May 2024
Inhulets Petrove	(Ukraine) Vladyslav Lupashko	Mutual agreement	5 June 2024	Pre-season	(Ukraine) Vasyl Kobin	15 June 2024
LNZ Cherkasy	(Belarus) Oleg Dulub	End of the contract	10 June 2024	Pre-season	(Spain) Andrés Carrasco	11 June 2024
Chornomorets Odesa	(Ukraine) Roman Hryhorchuk	Mutual consent	26 June 2024	Pre-season	(Ukraine) Stepan Matviyiv (caretaker)	26 June 2024
Chornomorets Odesa	(Ukraine) Stepan Matviyiv (caretaker)	End of the contract	30 June 2024	Pre-season	(Ukraine) Serhiy Politylo (caretaker)	1 July 2024
Chornomorets Odesa	(Ukraine) Stepan Matviyiv (caretaker)	End of the contract	30 June 2024	Pre-season	(Ukraine) Anatoliy Didenko (caretaker)	1 July 2024
Chornomorets Odesa	(Ukraine) Anatoliy Didenko & Serhiy Politylo (caretakers)	End of caretaker spell (Note: Despite the appointment to the position of head coach, Oleksandr Babych has not yet taken up his duties, so the team was led by Anatoliy Didenko)	13 July 2024	Pre-season	(Ukraine) Oleksandr Babych	9 July 2024
Karpaty Lviv	(Ukraine) Myron Markevych	Mutual consent	17 July 2024	Pre-season	(Ukraine) Vladyslav Lupashko	19 July 2024
Zorya Luhansk	(Ukraine) Yuriy Koval (caretaker)	Return to previous position	26 August 2024	8th	(Croatia) Mladen Bartulović (interim)	26 August 2024
Obolon Kyiv	(Ukraine) Valeriy Ivashchenko	Fired	4 September 2024	16th	(Ukraine) Oleksandr Antonenko (interim)	4 September 2024
Obolon Kyiv	(Ukraine) Oleksandr Antonenko (interim)	End of interim	5 September 2024	16th	(Ukraine) Serhiy Shyshchenko	5 September 2024
Vorskla Poltava	(Ukraine) Serhiy Dolhanskyi (caretaker)	Return to previous coaching role	23 October 2024	12th	(Ukraine) Yuriy Maksymov	24 October 2024
LNZ Cherkasy	(Spain) Andrés Carrasco	Suspended	11 December 2024	10th	(Ukraine) Artem Chorniy (caretaker)	11 December 2024
LNZ Cherkasy	(Spain) Andrés Carrasco	Sacked after suspended	12 December 2024	10th	(Ukraine) Andriy Dykan (caretaker)	12 December 2024
LNZ Cherkasy	(Ukraine) Artem Chorniy & Andriy Dykan (caretakers)	End of caretaker spell	18 December 2024	10th	(Ukraine) Roman Hryhorchuk	18 December 2024
Kolos Kovalivka	(Ukraine) Oleksandr Pozdeyev	Fired	10 March 2025	12th	(Ukraine) Ruslan Kostyshyn (interim)	10 March 2025
Chornomorets Odesa	(Ukraine) Oleksandr Babych	Change of role	24 March 2025	15th	(Ukraine) Oleksandr Kucher	24 March 2025
Polissya Zhytomyr	(Ukraine) Imad Ashur	Sacked	12 May 2025	5th	(Ukraine) Oleksandr Maksymov (caretaker)	12 May 2025

== League table ==
Pos	Team	Pld	W	D	L	GF	GA	GD	Pts	Qualification or relegation
1	Dynamo Kyiv (C)	30	20	10	0	61	19	+42	70	Qualification for the Champions League second qualifying round
2	Oleksandriya	30	20	7	3	46	22	+24	67	Qualification for the Conference League second qualifying round
3	Shakhtar Donetsk	30	18	8	4	69	26	+43	62	Qualification for the Europa League first qualifying round (Note: Shakhtar Donetsk qualified for the Europa League first qualifying round by winning the 2024–25 Ukrainian Cup; the second Conference League spot was passed to the fourth-placed team.)
4	Polissya Zhytomyr	30	12	12	6	38	28	+10	48	Qualification for the Conference League second qualifying round
5	Kryvbas Kryvyi Rih	30	13	8	9	34	26	+8	47	
6	Karpaty Lviv	30	13	7	10	42	36	+6	46	
7	Zorya Luhansk	30	12	4	14	34	39	−5	40	
8	Rukh Lviv	30	9	11	10	30	27	+3	38	
9	Veres Rivne	30	9	9	12	33	44	−11	36 (Note: Head-to-head points: Veres Rivne 6, Kolos Kovalivka 0.)	
10	Kolos Kovalivka	30	8	12	10	27	25	+2	36	
11	Obolon Kyiv	30	8	8	14	19	43	−24	32	
12	LNZ Cherkasy	30	7	10	13	25	37	−12	31	
13	Vorskla Poltava (R)	30	6	9	15	24	38	−14	27	Qualification for the Relegation play-off
14	Livyi Bereh Kyiv (R)	30	7	5	18	18	39	−21	26	Qualification for the Relegation play-off
15	Inhulets Petrove (R)	30	5	9	16	21	47	−26	24	Relegation to Ukrainian First League
16	Chornomorets Odesa (R)	30	6	5	19	20	45	−25	23	Relegation to Ukrainian First League

Source: upl.ua
Rules for classification: 1) Points; 2) Head-to-head points; 3) Head-to-head goal difference; 4) Head-to-head goals scored; 5) Goal difference; 6) Goals scored; 7) Draw or "Golden match" if two teams tied for title (Article 22, paragraph 3).
(C) Champions; (R) Relegated

== Results ==
Teams play each other twice on a home and away basis.

Home \ Away	CHO	DYN	INH	KAR	KOL	KRY	LIV	LNZ	OBL	OLK	PZH	RUX	SHA	VER	VOR	ZOR
Chornomorets Odesa		1–1	1–0	0–1	1–0	1–3	0–1	1–0	1–0	0–0	1–4	1–2	0–3	1–1	0–1	0–1
Dynamo Kyiv	3–1		5–2	2–0	1–1	2–1	2–0	1–0	3–0	3–0	2–1	0–0	1–1	1–0	3–1	2–2
Inhulets Petrove	1–0	0–4		1–2	0–2	2–0	2–1	0–0	0–1	0–1	0–1	0–1	1–4	0–0	1–1	1–0
Karpaty Lviv	4–0	1–3	0–0		1–0	3–0	3–0	1–0	1–0	2–1	1–3	3–1	0–0	5–0	1–1	1–3
Kolos Kovalivka	1–2	1–1	0–0	2–1		1–1	0–0	1–1	0–0	0–1	1–1	0–1	0–1	0–1	0–0	1–0
Kryvbas Kryvyi Rih	1–0	0–2	1–1	2–0	0–1		4–0	3–1	1–0	0–1	3–1	1–1	1–2	0–3	1–1	3–0
Livyi Bereh Kyiv	1–0	0–3	0–0	2–3	0–2	0–1		3–1	1–1	0–1	1–1	1–0	0–1	2–0	0–3	0–2
LNZ Cherkasy	1–1	1–2	2–0	2–1	2–0	0–0	1–0		0–1	0–2	0–1	3–1	1–4	1–2	0–0	1–1
Obolon Kyiv	1–0	1–5	2–1	2–2	2–2	0–1	1–0	1–0		0–0	0–0	0–4	0–2	0–0	1–0	0–2
Oleksandriya	3–0	0–0	2–1	3–0	2–1	1–0	2–0	1–1	4–0		1–0	1–1	4–3	3–1	1–0	2–1
Polissia Zhytomyr	3–1	0–0	1–1	1–1	1–1	1–1	0–0	1–1	4–0	1–2		0–1	1–0	2–1	2–1	1–1
Rukh Lviv	1–1	0–2	5–0	0–1	0–0	0–0	1–0	0–1	1–3	1–1	1–1		1–1	2–0	0–1	3–0
Shakhtar Donetsk	2–1	2–2	6–0	5–2	2–4	1–1	1–0	5–1	4–0	3–0	0–1	1–1		3–0	3–1	3–1
Veres Rivne	2–1	1–2	2–2	0–0	2–1	0–2	1–3	1–1	0–2	1–1	5–1	2–0	1–1		2–2	2–1
Vorskla Poltava	1–2	1–1	0–3	0–0	0–1	0–1	0–1	2–0	2–0	1–3	0–2	0–0	0–5	3–0		1–2
Zorya Luhansk	2–1	0–2	2–1	2–1	0–3	0–1	2–1	1–2	2–1	1–2	0–1	2–0	0–0	1–2	2–0	

Source: UPL calendar
Legend: Blue = home team win; Yellow = draw; Red = away team win.
For upcoming matches, an "a" indicates there is an article about the rivalry between the two participants.

=== Matches affected by air alerts ===
Round 2.
Shakhtar vs Polissia. The match had been interrupted in the 61st minute for 30 minutes.
Round 3.
Vorskla vs Obolon. Kick off time was delayed for 35 minutes. The match had been interrupted in the 16th minute.
Zorya vs Oleksandriya. Kick off time was delayed for 45 minutes.
Round 4.
Livyi Bereh vs Chornomorets. Kick off time was delayed for 90 minutes.
LNZ vs Karpaty. Kick off time was postponed for 6 hours.
Round 5.
Kryvbas vs Shakhtar. The match, which kicked off on 1 September 2024, has been interrupted in the 50th minute. After resumed, 16 April 2025, the match was firstly delayed for 45 minutes and then interrupted again, in 63th minute.
Round 6.
Vorskla vs Rukh. Beginning of the second half was delayed for 20 minutes.
Round 7.
Kryvbas vs Vorskla. Kick off time was delayed for 30 minutes. The match had been interrupted in the 6th minute. Beginning of the second half was delayed for 18 minutes.
Round 8.
Veres vs Shakhtar. Kick off time was delayed for 27 minutes.
Round 10.
Oleksandriya vs Vorskla. Kick off time was delayed for 40 minutes.
Round 11.
Kryvbas vs LNZ. Kick off time was delayed for 80 minutes.
Round 13.
Livyi Bereh vs Inhulets. Kick off time was delayed for 25 minutes.
Kolos vs Kryvbas. Kick off time was delayed for 80 minutes.
Round 14.
Veres vs Oleksandriya. Kick off time was delayed for 90 minutes.
Round 16.
Inhulets vs Zorya. The match, which kicked off on 8 December 2024 (kick off time was delayed for 141 minute), has been interrupted during half-time. It was resumed on 30 April 2025, at another stadium.
Kolos vs Obolon. Kick off time was delayed for 110 minutes. Beginning of the second half was delayed for 35 minutes.
Dynamo vs Oleksandriya. The match had been interrupted in the 58th minute for 38 minutes.
Round 17.
Vorskla vs Livyi Bereh. Beginning of the second half was delayed for 100 minutes.
Oleksandriya vs LNZ. The match had been interrupted in the 30th minute. Beginning of the second half was delayed for 40 minutes.
Kryvbas vs Karpaty. Kick off time was delayed for 30 minutes.
Round 21.
Kryvbas vs Livyi Bereh. The match, which kicked off on 15 March 2025 (kick off time was delayed for 107 minutes), has been interrupted in the 2nd minute. The match was resumed on 7 May 2025.
Round 22.
Inhulets vs Veres. Kick off time was delayed for 20 minutes.
Livyi Bereh vs Oleksandriya. Beginning of the second half was delayed for 64 minutes.
Vorskla vs Kryvbas. Kick off time was delayed for 10 minutes.
Round 23.
Vorskla vs Zorya. Kick off time was delayed for 45 minutes.
Round 24.
Kryvbas vs Dynamo. Kick off time was delayed for 15 minutes and then postponed for 55 minutes.
Vorskla vs Polissya. The match had been interrupted in the 23rd minute for 12 minutes.
Round 25.
Vorskla vs Oleksandria. Kick off the time was delayed for 65 minutes and had been interrupted in the 6th minute for 18 minutes.
Livyi Bereh vs Polissya. Kick off the time was delayed for 30 minutes
Round 27
LNZ vs Zorya. Kick off the time was delayed for 60 minutes.
Round 28
Kryvbas vs Kolos. Kick of the time was delayed for 65 minutes.
Round 30
Inhulets vs Vorskla. The match had been interrupted in the 9th minute for 19 minutes.
Obolon vs Livyi Bereh. The match had been interrupted in the 6th minute for 30 minutes.

== Mini tournament ==
On 22 July 2024 the UAF executive committee approved that the club which will replace SC Dnipro-1 should be the winner of the transitional tournament, organization of which was awarded to the UPL. The draw of the tournament was scheduled for the same date. The tournament was decided to include three games (two semifinals and a final) on 26 and 30 July 2024. The tournament was won by Livyi Bereh that gained promotion to the 2024–25 Ukrainian Premier League.

Semi-finals; 26 July 2024
1L	Livyi Bereh Kyiv (p)	1 (5)
PL	Metalist 1925 Kharkiv	1 (4)
1L	Epitsentr Kamianets-Podilskyi	3 (3)
PL	FC Mynai (p)	3 (5)

Final; 30 July 2024
1L	Livyi Bereh Kyiv	3
PL	FC Mynai	0

=== Semi-finals ===
Team 1	Score	Team 2
Livyi Bereh Kyiv	1–1 (5–4 p)	Metalist 1925 Kharkiv
Epitsentr Kamianets-Podilskyi	3–3 (3–5 p)	FC Mynai

26 July 2024	Livyi Bereh Kyiv	1–1 (a.e.t.) (5–4 p)	Metalist 1925 Kharkiv	Zolocha community, Kyiv Oblast
15:30 UTC+3	Voytsekhovskyi 45+1'	Report	Kravets 90+5'	Stadium: Livyi Bereh Arena; Attendance: 1,280; Referee: Andriy Kovalenko, Poltava
	Penalties
	Spivakov (penalty scored); Kolesnyk (penalty scored); Sidney (penalty scored); Dedukh (penalty scored); Sokolov (penalty scored)		Boryachuk (penalty scored); Panchenko (penalty scored); Kravets (penalty scored); Sydorov (penalty scored); Moura (penalty missed)

26 July 2024	Epitsentr Kamianets-Podilskyi	3–3 (a.e.t.) (3–5 p)	FC Mynai	Rivne
18:00 UTC+3	Myronyuk 12'; Bendera 66'; Kravchuk 77'	Report	Vakula 19'; Prikhna 57'; Remenyak 87'	Stadium: Avanhard; Attendance: 310; Referee: Oleksandr Omelchenko, Slovyansk
	Penalties
	Zaporozhets (penalty scored); Ravlyk (penalty missed); Kravchuk (penalty scored); Klymets (penalty scored)		Demydenko (penalty scored); Remenyak (penalty scored); Dmytruk (penalty scored); Korablin (penalty scored); Kysil (penalty scored)

=== Final ===
Team 1	Score	Team 2
Livyi Bereh Kyiv	3–0	FC Mynai

30 July 2024	Livyi Bereh Kyiv	3–0	FC Mynai	Rivne
18:00 UTC+3	Sukhoruchko 20'; Synytsya 29'; M.Kohut 65'; Spivakov (yellow card) 89' (yellow-red card) 90+2'	Report		Stadium: Avanhard; Attendance: 300; Referee: Oleksandr Shandor, Lviv

Livyi Bereh Kyiv won the Mini tournament by beating in its final game Mynai, thus gaining promotion in place of SC Dnipro-1. Epitsentr Kamianets-Podilskyi remained in the Ukrainian First League, while Mynai and Metalist 1925 Kharkiv both were relegated to the Ukrainian First League.

== Relegation play-offs ==
Teams that placed 13th and 14th in the 2024–25 Ukrainian Premier League played two-leg play-off with the third and fourth teams of the 2024–25 Ukrainian First League. As a result, both the Ukrainian First League teams (Metalist 1925 and Kudrivka) received promotion after beating the Ukrainian Premier League teams (Vorskla and Livyi Bereh), which in turn were relegated. Due to the Russian 2025 summer escalation and the Russian ballistic missile attack warnings, on 1 June 2025, both matches were suspended but later renewed.

Team 1	Agg.	Team 2	1st leg	2nd leg
Kudrivka	2–2 (4–3 p)	Vorskla Poltava	1–2	1–0
Livyi Bereh Kyiv	0–2	Metalist 1925 Kharkiv	0–1	0–1

=== First Semi-final ===
29 May 2025	Kudrivka	1–2	Vorskla Poltava	Kyiv
15:30	Kozak 83'	Report	Ndukve 23'; Pavlyuk 39'	Stadium: Obolon Arena; Attendance: 1,100; Referee: Dmytro Panchyshyn (Kharkiv)

1 June 2025	Vorskla Poltava	0–1 (3–4 p)	Kudrivka	Poltava
13:00		Report	Lytovchenko 9'	Stadium: Vorskla; Attendance: 2,204; Referee: Mykola Balakin (Kyiv oblast)
	Penalties
	Ndukve (penalty scored); Malysh (penalty scored); Iyede (penalty missed); Kane (penalty missed); Salabay (penalty scored); Sklyar (penalty missed)		(penalty scored) Tuzenko; (penalty missed) Storchous; (penalty scored) Shershen; (penalty scored) Potimkov; (penalty missed) Serdyuk; (penalty scored) Liehostayev

2–2 on aggregate; Kudrivka won 4–3 on penalties and promotion to Premier League. While, Vorskla lost 3–4 on penalties and relegation to First League

=== Second Semi-final ===
29 May 2025	Livyi Bereh Kyiv	0–1	Metalist 1925 Kharkiv	Hnidyn, Kyiv Oblast
18:00		Report	Moura 38'	Stadium: Arena Livyi Bereh; Attendance: 1,167; Referee: Viktor Kopiyevskyi (Kropyvnytskyi)

1 June 2025	Metalist 1925 Kharkiv	1–0	Livyi Bereh Kyiv	Hnidyn, Kyiv Oblast
15:30	Kalitvintsev 90'	Report		Stadium: Arena Livyi Bereh; Attendance: 1,800; Referee: Vitaliy Romanov (Dnipro)

Metalist 1925 Kharkiv won 2–0 on aggregate and promotion to Premier League. While, Livyi Bereh Kyiv lost 0–2 on aggregate and relegation to First League.

== Season statistics ==
=== Top goalscorers ===
As of 25 May 2025

Rank	Scorer	Team	Goals (Pen.)
1	(Ukraine) Vladyslav Vanat	Dynamo Kyiv	17 (2)
2	(Ukraine) Yehor Tverdokhlib	Kryvbas Kryvyi Rih	14 (0)
3	(Ukraine) Heorhiy Sudakov	Shakhtar Donetsk	13 (2)
4	(Ukraine) Artem Bondarenko	Shakhtar Donetsk	12 (1)
5	(Ukraine) Oleksiy Hutsulyak	Polissya Zhytomyr	11 (1)
6	(Ukraine) Ambrosiy Chachua	Karpaty Lviv	10 (0)
6	(Ukraine) Oleksandr Filippov	Oleksandriya	10 (1)
8	(Serbia) Petar Mićin	Zorya Luhansk	9 (0)
9	(Ukraine) Pylyp Budkivskyi	Zorya Luhansk	8 (1)
9	(Brazil) Bruninho	Karpaty Lviv	8 (3)

=== Clean sheets ===
As of 25 May 2025

Rank	Player	Club	Clean sheets
1	(Ukraine) Heorhiy Yermakov	Oleksandriya	15
2	(Ukraine) Ivan Pakholyuk	Kolos Kovalivka	11
3	(Ukraine) Pavlo Isenko	Vorskla Poltava	10
3	(Ukraine) Andriy Klishchuk	Kryvbas Kryvyi Rih	10
3	(Ukraine) Dmytro Ledviy	Rukh Lviv	10
3	(Ukraine) Dmytro Riznyk	Shakhtar Donetsk	10
7	(Ukraine) Oleksiy Palamarchuk	Inhulets Petrove	9
8	(Ukraine) Oleksandr Kemkin	Karpaty Lviv	8
8	(Ukraine) Maksym Mekhaniv	Livyi Bereh Kyiv	8
10	(Ukraine) Heorhiy Bushchan	Dynamo Kyiv	7
10	(Ukraine) Denys Marchenko	Obolon Kyiv	7
10	(Ukraine) Ruslan Neshcheret	Dynamo Kyiv	7
10	(Ukraine) Yevhen Volynets	Polissya Zhytomyr	7

=== Hat-tricks ===
As of 24 May 2025

Player	For	Against	Result	Date
(Ukraine) Oleksandr Filippov	Oleksandriya	Shakhtar Donetsk	4–3 (H)	24 August 2024
(Ukraine) Oleksandr Nazarenko	Polissya Zhytomyr	Obolon Kyiv	4–0 (H)	25 August 2024
(Ukraine) Artem Bondarenko	Shakhtar Donetsk	Karpaty Lviv	5–2 (H)	14 September 2024
(Ukraine) Heorhiy Sudakov^{4}	Shakhtar Donetsk	LNZ Cherkasy	5–1 (H)	6 October 2024
(Portugal) Miguel Campos	Oleksandriya	Karpaty Lviv	3–0 (H)	9 November 2024
(Ukraine) Yehor Tverdokhlib	Kryvbas Kryvyi Rih	Polissya Zhytomyr	3–1 (H)	30 November 2024
(Brazil) Bruninho	Karpaty Lviv	Chornomorets Odesa	4–0 (H)	30 March 2025

== Awards ==
=== Monthly awards ===
Month	Player of the Month		Coach of the Month		Ref.
Month	Player	Club	Coach	Club	Ref.
August 2024	(Ukraine) Oleksandr Nazarenko	Polissya Zhytomyr	(Ukraine) Ruslan Rotan	FC Oleksandriya	
September 2024	(Ukraine) Volodymyr Brazhko	Dynamo Kyiv	(Ukraine) Imad Ashur	Polissya Zhytomyr	
October 2024	(Ukraine) Oleksandr Nazarenko	Polissya Zhytomyr	(Ukraine) Vladyslav Lupashko	Karpaty Lviv	
November 2024	(Ukraine) Yehor Tverdokhlib	Kryvbas Kryvyi Rih	(Ukraine) Oleh Shandruk	Veres Rivne	
December 2024	(Ukraine) Yehor Tverdokhlib	Kryvbas Kryvyi Rih	(Ukraine) Yuriy Vernydub	Kryvbas Kryvyi Rih	
February 2025 March 2025	(Brazil) Bruninho	Karpaty Lviv	(Ukraine) Vladyslav Lupashko	Karpaty Lviv	
April 2025	(Ukraine) Vladyslav Vanat	Dynamo Kyiv	(Ukraine) Oleksandr Shovkovskyi	Dynamo Kyiv	
May 2025	(Ukraine) Ambrosiy Chachua	Karpaty Lviv	(Ukraine) Ruslan Rotan	FC Oleksandriya	

=== Round awards ===
The list includes winners of the Round by the Ukrainian Premier League as well as the Ukrainian internet publisher "SportArena".

Round	Player			Coach		
Round	Player	Club	Reference	Coach	Club	Reference
Round 1	(Ukraine) Mykola Matviyenko (SA)	Shakhtar Donetsk		(Netherlands) Marino Pušić (SA)	Shakhtar Donetsk	
Round 2	(Ukraine) Yevhen Volynets	Polissya Zhytomyr		(Ukraine) Imad Ashur	Polissya Zhytomyr	
Round 2	(Ukraine) Mykola Shaparenko (SA)	Dynamo Kyiv		(Ukraine) Imad Ashur (SA)	Polissya Zhytomyr	
Round 3	(Ukraine) Oleksandr Pikhalyonok (SA)	Dynamo Kyiv		(Ukraine) Ruslan Rotan (SA)	FC Oleksandriya	
Round 4	(Ukraine) Oleksandr Filippov (SA)	FC Oleksandriya		(Ukraine) Ruslan Rotan (SA)	FC Oleksandriya	
Round 5	(Ukraine) Illya Kvasnytsya (SA)	Rukh Lviv		(Ukraine) Vitaliy Pervak (SA)	Livyi Bereh Kyiv	
Round 6	(Ukraine) Artem Bondarenko (SA)	Shakhtar Donetsk		(Netherlands) Marino Pušić (SA)	Shakhtar Donetsk	
Round 7	(Ukraine) Heorhiy Sudakov	Shakhtar Donetsk		(Ukraine) Vitaliy Ponomaryov	Rukh Lviv	
Round 7	(Ukraine) Mykyta Kravchenko (SA)	FC Oleksandriya		(Ukraine) Oleksandr Pozdeyev (SA)	Kolos Kovalivka	
Round 8	(Ukraine) Oleksiy Hutsulyak	Polissya Zhytomyr		(Ukraine) Oleh Shandruk	Veres Rivne	
Round 8	(Ukraine) Oleksiy Hutsulyak (SA)	Polissya Zhytomyr		(Ukraine) Ruslan Rotan (SA)	FC Oleksandriya	
Round 9	(Ukraine) Heorhiy Sudakov	Shakhtar Donetsk		(Netherlands) Marino Pušić	Shakhtar Donetsk	
Round 9	(Ukraine) Heorhiy Sudakov (SA)	Shakhtar Donetsk		(Ukraine) Oleksandr Babych (SA)	Chornomorets Odesa	
Round 10	(Ukraine) Vladyslav Vanat	Dynamo Kyiv		(Ukraine) Vladyslav Lupashko	Karpaty Lviv	
Round 10	(Ukraine) Illya Putrya (SA)	LNZ Cherkasy		(Ukraine) Oleksandr Shovkovskyi (SA)	Dynamo Kyiv	
Round 11	(Croatia) Hrvoje Ilić (SA)	Kryvbas Kryvyi Rih		(Ukraine) Yuriy Vernydub (SA)	Kryvbas Kryvyi Rih	
Round 12	(Ukraine) Vladyslav Vanat	Dynamo Kyiv		(Ukraine) Ruslan Rotan	FC Oleksandriya	
Round 12	(Ukraine) Mykola Shaparenko (SA)	Dynamo Kyiv		(Ukraine) Ruslan Rotan (SA)	FC Oleksandriya	
Round 13	(Portugal) Miguel Campos	FC Oleksandriya		(Ukraine) Ruslan Rotan	FC Oleksandriya	
Round 13	(Portugal) Miguel Campos (SA)	FC Oleksandriya		(Ukraine) Oleh Shandruk (SA)	Veres Rivne	
Round 14	(Ukraine) Vitaliy Buyalskyi	Dynamo Kyiv		(Ukraine) Yuriy Maksymov	Vorskla Poltava	
Round 14	(Ukraine) Oleksandr Zubkov (SA)	Shakhtar Donetsk		(Ukraine) Yuriy Maksymov (SA)	Vorskla Poltava	
Round 15	(Ukraine) Yehor Tverdokhlib (SA)	Kryvbas Kryvyi Rih		(Ukraine) Vasyl Kobin (SA)	Inhulets Petrove	
Round 16	(Ukraine) Vladyslav Vanat (SA)	Dynamo Kyiv		(Ukraine) Oleksandr Shovkovskyi (SA)	Dynamo Kyiv	
Round 17	(Ukraine) Rostyslav Taranukha	Obolon Kyiv		(Ukraine) Imad Ashur	Polissya Zhytomyr	
Round 17	(Ukraine) Bohdan Mykhaylichenko (SA)	Polissya Zhytomyr		(Ukraine) Serhiy Shyshchenko (SA)	Obolon Kyiv	
winter break
Round 18	(Ukraine) Oleksandr Filippov (SA)	FC Oleksandriya		(Ukraine) Oleh Shandruk (SA)	Veres Rivne	
Round 19	(Ukraine) Heorhiy Sudakov	Shakhtar Donetsk		(Ukraine) Vasyl Kobin	Inhulets Petrove	
Round 19	(Ukraine) Heorhiy Sudakov (SA)	Shakhtar Donetsk		(Netherlands) Marino Pušić (SA)	Shakhtar Donetsk	
Round 20	(Serbia) Petar Mićin (SA)	Zorya Luhansk		(Ukraine) Vitaliy Pervak (SA)	Livyi Bereh Kyiv	
Round 21	(Ukraine) Ruslan Stepanyuk (SA)	Veres Rivne		(Ukraine) Oleh Shandruk (SA)	Veres Rivne	
Round 22	(Brazil) Bruninho (SA)	Karpaty Lviv		(Ukraine) Ruslan Kostyshyn (SA)	Kolos Kovalivka	
Round 23	(Ukraine) Heorhiy Sudakov	Shakhtar Donetsk		(Ukraine) Oleksandr Kucher	Chornomorets Odesa	
Round 23	(Brazil) Vinicius Tobias (SA)	Shakhtar Donetsk		(Ukraine) Oleksandr Kucher (SA)	Chornomorets Odesa	
Round 24	(Brazil) Marlon Gomes	Shakhtar Donetsk		(Ukraine) Oleh Shandruk	Veres Rivne	
Round 24	(Brazil) Marlon Gomes (SA)	Shakhtar Donetsk		(Ukraine) Vladyslav Lupashko (SA)	Karpaty Lviv	
Round 25	(Ukraine) Vladyslav Veleten (SA)	Kolos Kovalivka		(Ukraine) Ruslan Kostyshyn (SA)	Kolos Kovalivka	
Round 26	(Ukraine) Oleksandr Yatsyk	Zorya Luhansk		(Ukraine) Yuriy Maksymov	Vorskla Poltava	
Round 26	(Ukraine) Vladyslav Kabayev (SA)	Dynamo Kyiv		(Ukraine) Yuriy Maksymov (SA)	Vorskla Poltava	
Round 27	(Ukraine) Ambrosiy Chachua	Karpaty Lviv		(Ukraine) Ruslan Rotan	FC Oleksandriya	
Round 27	(Albania) Tedi Cara (SA)	FC Oleksandriya		(Ukraine) Ruslan Rotan (SA)	FC Oleksandriya	
Round 28	(Ukraine) Ambrosiy Chachua	Karpaty Lviv		(Ukraine) Vladyslav Lupashko	Karpaty Lviv	
Round 28	(Ukraine) Yevheniy Skyba (SA)	Chornomorets Odesa		(Ukraine) Vladyslav Lupashko (SA)	Karpaty Lviv	
Round 29	(Albania) Tedi Cara	FC Oleksandriya		(Ukraine) Ruslan Kostyshyn	Kolos Kovalivka	
Round 29	(Ukraine) Dmytro Shastal (SA)	Livyi Bereh Kyiv		(Ukraine) Ruslan Kostyshyn (SA)	Kolos Kovalivka	
Round 30	(Ukraine) Pylyp Budkivskyi (SA)	Zorya Luhansk		(Croatia) Mladen Bartulović (SA)	Zorya Luhansk	
Round 30	(Uruguay) Facundo Batista	Polissya Zhytomyr		(Croatia) Mladen Bartulović	Zorya Luhansk	

== See also ==
- 2024–25 Ukrainian Cup
- 2024–25 Ukrainian First League
- 2024–25 Ukrainian Second League
- 2024–25 Ukrainian Football Amateur League
- 2024–25 Ukrainian Women's Top League
- List of Ukrainian football transfers summer 2024
- List of Ukrainian football transfers winter 2024–25
