= 2023–24 Ukrainian First League =

Ukrainian First League
- Season: 2023–24
- Dates: 27 July – 25 November 2023 (first stage); 23 March – 25 May 2024 (second stage); June 2024 (play-offs)
- Champions: Inhulets Petrove (1st title)
- Promoted: Inhulets Petrove; Karpaty Lviv; Livyi Bereh Kyiv (via mini-tournament)
- Relegated: Chernihiv-ShVSM; Hirnyk-Sport Horishni Plavni
- Matches: 280
- Goals: 701 (2.5 per match)
- Top goalscorer: Andriy Khoma (Prykarpattia); Dmytro Shcherbak (Poltava); Vasyl Palahnyuk (Bukovyna) (14 goals)
- Biggest home win: Prykarpattia 7–0 Khust (28 August 2023)
- Biggest away win: Kremin 0–6 Poltava (28 August 2023); Khust 1–7 Dinaz (25 May 2024)
- Highest scoring: Khust 1–7 Dinaz (25 May 2024)
- Longest winning run: Inhulets Petrove; Karpaty Lviv; Livyi Bereh Kyiv (7 matches)
- Longest unbeaten run: Karpaty Lviv (14 matches)
- Longest winless run: Metalist Kharkiv; Dinaz Vyshhorod (11 matches)
- Longest losing run: Khust (9 matches)
- Total attendance: 0
- Average attendance: 0
- All statistics correct as of end of season.

The 2023–24 Ukrainian First League was the 33rd football league since its establishment. The league competition consisted of 20 teams. The competition took place during the ongoing war with the Russia since late February 2022. It was decided to conduct competitions in two groups.

The competitions were officially approved by the Ukrainian Association of Football Executive Committee only two days before the start of the season. Matches of the First League were the first games of the 2023–24 season.

== Format ==
Due to the Russo-Ukrainian War, the league competitions changed its usual format. The Professional Football League of Ukraine (PFL) Conference adopted changes to the 2022–23 season after some 24 PFL teams were forced to suspend their activities or dissolve. It was decided to keep the number of participants at 20, but split them in two groups of 10.

The competitions are scheduled to consist of two stages. At the first stage two groups of 10 would conduct a usual double round-robin tournament. At the second stage, the top five from each group form the promotion group, while the bottom five from each group – the relegation group. Points earned at the first stage will be kept for the second, while teams would only be playing with participants of the group. So, in total each team is expected to play 28 games. The top two teams of the promotion group receive direct promotion to the Ukrainian Premier League (UPL), while the 3rd and the 4th would play promotion relegation play-off with the 14th and the 13th teams of UPL, respectively. In case if Desna and Mariupol would decide to return, play-off games will be canceled and the UPL will be expanded.

Later it was clarified that for the second stage teams will be keeping all their points, unlike in the previous season when clubs only kept points with their opponents that joined them for the second stage from the first stage.

== Teams ==
This season, Ukrainian First League consisted of 20 teams.

=== Promoted and returning teams ===
Two teams were promoted at the end of the 2022–23 Ukrainian Second League.

- Nyva Buzova – first place (debut)
- FC Khust – playoff winner (debut)

Two more teams were allowed to return as members of the 2021–22 Ukrainian First League.

- Ahrobiznes Volochysk – (returning after a season)
- Podillya Khmelnytskyi – (returning after a season)

Two more were promoted from the 2021–22 Ukrainian Second League.

- Viktoriya Sumy – merger (debut, in place of Alians Lypova Dolyna)
- Livyi Bereh Kyiv – Group A second place (debut)

=== Relegated teams ===
Two teams were relegated at the end of the 2022–23 Ukrainian Premier League.

- Metalist Kharkiv – 15th placed (returning after a season)
- Inhulets Petrove – playoff losing team (returning after two seasons)

=== Relocated teams ===
Due to the Russian military aggression, three clubs in the league were forced to relocate.

- FC Metalist Kharkiv moved to Uzhhorod
- FC Metalurh Zaporizhzhia moved to Uman
- FSC Mariupol moved to Boryspil

=== Withdrawn teams ===
The 31st PFL Conference stripped five clubs of their membership in the Professional Football League due to no reply and non-payment of dues. The conference approved to reserve membership for some other clubs without their actual active participation in competitions this season.

==== Teams with "conservated membership" ====
FC Lviv (relegated), Skoruk Tomakivka, FC Uzhhorod, FC Kramatorsk, VPK-Ahro Shevchenkivka

==== Teams with "conservated membership" removed ====
Olimpik Donetsk, Volyn Lutsk

=== Reorganization ===
- Nyva Buzova changed its owner. On 14 December 2023 it was announced that original owner abandoned the club, and it was passed on to another club FC Kudrivka (Second League) which plans to relocate to Kyiv suburb of Irpin next season. The announcement appeared a day before the second stage draw. Earlier on 1 December 2023 Ihor Zhabchenko has confirmed the club's intent to withdraw from competitions. On 5 January 2024 it was announced that the head coach of the second tier Kudrivka Roman Loktionov became the head coach of Nyva Buzova. Following the merger, Nyva Buzova changed its name to Kudrivka-Nyva.

=== Location map ===
The following displays the location of teams. Group A teams marked in red. Group B teams marked in green.

Home venues of teams in the 2023–24 Ukrainian First League.

== Stadiums ==
The following stadiums were used as home grounds for the teams in the competition.

Rank	Stadium	Location	Capacity	Club	Notes
1	Ukraina Stadium	Lviv	27,925	Karpaty Lviv	
2	Yuvileiny Stadium	Sumy	25,830	Viktoriya Sumy	
3	Ternopil City Stadium	Ternopil	15,150	Nyva Ternopil	
4	Bukovyna Stadium	Chernivtsi	12,000	Bukovyna Chernivtsi	
5	Avanhard Stadium	Uzhhorod	10,383	Metalist Kharkiv	used as home ground during the season
6	Central Stadium	Uman	7,552	Metalurh Zaporizhzhia	used as home ground during the season
7	Sport Complex Podillia	Khmelnytskyi	6,800	Podillia Khmelnytskyi	
8	MCS Rukh	Ivano-Frankivsk	6,200	Prykarpattia Ivano-Frankivsk	
9	Kolos Stadium	Boryspil	5,400	FSC Mariupol	used as home ground during the season
10	Karpaty Stadium	Khust	5,200	FC Khust	
11	Arena Livyi Bereh	Zolochivska hromada	4,700	Livyi Bereh Kyiv	
12	Yunist Stadium	Chernihiv	3,000	FC Chernihiv	
13	Yunist Stadium	Volochysk	2,700	Ahrobiznes Volochysk	
14	Yunist Stadium	Horishni Plavni	2,500	Hirnyk-Sport Horishni Plavni	
15	Tonkocheyev Stadium	Kamianets-Podilskyi	2,500	Epitsentr Kamianets-Podilskyi	
16	Inhulets Stadium	Petrove	1,869	Inhulets Petrove	
17	Kremin Stadium	Kremenchuk	1,566	Kremin Kremenchuk	
18	Yuvileinyi Stadium	Bucha	1,200	Nyva Buzova	
19	Molodizhnyi Stadium	Poltava	680	SC Poltava	
20	Dinaz Stadium	Demydiv	550	Dinaz Vyshhorod	

== Personnel and sponsorship ==
Team	President	Head coach	Captain	Kit manufacturer	Shirt sponsor
Ahrobiznes Volochysk	Oleh Sobutskyi	Oleksandr Chyzhevskyi	(Azerbaijan) Andrey Popovich	Nike	Ahrobiznes
Bukovyna Chernivtsi	Andriy Safronyak	Valeriy Kryventsov	Maksym Lopyryonok	Nike	Тайстра
Chernihiv	Yuriy Synytsya	Valeriy Chornyi	Vitaliy Mentey	Jako	–
Dinaz Vyshhorod	Yaroslav Moskalenko	Oleksandr Holovko	Andriy Voloshyn	Nike	Цар Хліб
Epitsentr Kamianets-Podilskyi	Ivan Chernonoh	Serhiy Nahornyak	Andriy Bezhenar	Macron	Епіцентр
Hirnyk-Sport Horishni Plavni	Petro Kaplun	Valeriy Kutsenko	Yevheniy Moroz	Jako	Ferrexpo
Inhulets Petrove	Oleksandr Povoroznyuk	Vladyslav Lupashko	Oleksandr Kozak (Note: FC Inhulets Petrove does not have an established team captain and a footballer with such designation changes from one match to another.)	Macron	etg.ua
Karpaty Lviv	Stepan Yurchyshyn	Myron Markevych	Ambrosiy Chachua	Nike	Львівське
Khust	Mykhaylo Madyarchyk	Volodymyr Tsytkin	Bohdan Pavlych	Joma	—
Kremin Kremenchuk	Serhiy Kovnir	Ihor Klymovskyi	Orest Panchyshyn	SWIFT	TERMINAL-MK
Livyi Bereh Kyiv	Mykola Lavrenko	Vitaliy Pervak	Andriy Spivakov	Nike	—
Mariupol	Oleksandr Yaroshenko	Oleh Krasnopyorov	Ivan Mochevinskyi	Joma	KOD Zdorovia
Metalist Kharkiv	Oleksandr Yaroslavskyi	Andriy Anishchenko	(Brazil) Gabriel Gomes	Joma	DCH
Metalurh Zaporizhzhia	Maksym Lupashko	Anton Hai (caretaker)	Volodymyr Blyznyuk (Note: Since the second half of the season FC Metalurh Zaporizhzhia does not have an established team captain and a footballer with such designation changes from one match to another.)	Legea	Weltum
Nyva Buzova	Roman Solodarenko (Oktay Efendiyev)	Roman Loktionov	Yevhen Misiura	Nike	—
Nyva Ternopil	Oleksandr Stadnyk	Oleksandr Stakhiv	Roman Volokhatyi	Jako	—
Podillya Khmelnytskyi	Yevhen Beiderman	Vitaliy Kostyshyn	Oleksandr Tsybulnyk	Kelme	—
Poltava	Serhiy Ivashchenko	Volodymyr Sysenko	Dmytro Shcherbak	Joma	КВП
Prykarpattia Ivano-Frankivsk	Vasyl Olshanetskyi	Oleh Rypan	Vasyl Tsyutsyura	Joma	Morshynska
Viktoriya Sumy	Serhiy Bondarenko	Anatoliy Bezsmertnyi	Andriy Nelin	Puma	—

=== Managerial changes ===
Team	Outgoing head coach	Manner of departure	Date of vacancy	Table	Incoming head coach	Date of appointment
Hirnyk-Sport Horishni Plavni	(Ukraine) Serhiy Diryavka	Fired	30 May 2023	Pre-season	(Ukraine) Valeriy Kutsenko	19 June 2023
Nyva Buzova	(Ukraine) Serhiy Karpenko	Resigned	1 June 2023	Pre-season	(Ukraine) Ihor Zhabchenko	5 June 2023
Metalist Kharkiv	(Serbia) Perica Ognjenović (interim)	Resigned	8 June 2023	Pre-season	(Ukraine) Andriy Anishchenko	24 June 2023
Inhulets Petrove	(Ukraine) Vladyslav Lupashko (interim)	Change of role	15 June 2023	Pre-season	(Ukraine) Vladyslav Lupashko	15 June 2023
Nyva Ternopil	(Ukraine) Serhiy Atlasyuk (interim)	Sacked	21 June 2023	Pre-season	(Ukraine) Vasyl Malyk	21 June 2023
Viktoriya Sumy	(Ukraine) Volodymyr Romanenko (interim)			Pre-season	(Ukraine) Anatoliy Bezsmertnyi	28 June 2023
Nyva Ternopil	(Ukraine) Vasyl Malyk	Sacked	19 September 2023	4th (Group A)	(Ukraine) Oleksandr Stakhiv (caretaker)	20 September 2023
Kremin Kremenchuk	(Ukraine) Roman Loktionov	Resigned	24 September 2023	8th (Group B)	(Ukraine) Ihor Klymovskyi	27 September 2023
Nyva Buzova	(Ukraine) Ihor Zhabchenko	Administrative changes	3 December 2023	4th (Group A)	(Ukraine) Roman Loktionov	5 January 2024
Nyva Ternopil	(Ukraine) Oleksandr Stakhiv (caretaker)	Change of role	4 December 2023	8th (Group A)	(Ukraine) Oleksandr Stakhiv	4 December 2023
Metalurh Zaporizhzhia	(Ukraine) Volodymyr Mykytin	Left the club	21 March 2024	11th	(Ukraine) Anton Hai (caretaker)	15 March 2024
Bukovyna Chernivtsi	(Ukraine) Andriy Melnychuk	Sacked	13 May 2024	12th	(Ukraine) Hryhoriy Churilov (interim)	13 May 2024
Bukovyna Chernivtsi	(Ukraine) Hryhoriy Churilov (interim)	End of interim	24 May 2024	11th	(Ukraine) Valeriy Kryventsov	24 May 2024

== Group A league table ==
Pos	Team	Pld	W	D	L	GF	GA	GD	Pts	Promotion, qualification or relegation
1	Karpaty Lviv	18	14	3	1	34	10	+24	45	Qualified to the Promotion group
2	Epitsentr Kamianets-Podilskyi	18	8	7	3	27	21	+6	31	Qualified to the Promotion group
3	Ahrobiznes Volochysk	18	8	5	5	20	15	+5	29	Qualified to the Promotion group
4	Nyva Buzova	18	7	6	5	21	19	+2	27	Qualified to the Promotion group
5	Prykarpattia Ivano-Frankivsk	18	6	8	4	27	18	+9	26	Qualified to the Promotion group
6	Bukovyna Chernivtsi	18	6	3	9	16	23	−7	21	Qualified to the Relegation group
7	Podillia Khmelnytskyi	18	4	8	6	18	17	+1	20 (Note: Head-to-head points: Podillia 4, Nyva T. 1)	Qualified to the Relegation group
8	Nyva Ternopil	18	5	5	8	15	19	−4	20	Qualified to the Relegation group
9	Metalist Kharkiv	18	3	5	10	13	27	−14	14	Qualified to the Relegation group
10	Khust	18	3	2	13	15	37	−22	11	Qualified to the Relegation group

Source: PFL.ua
Rules for classification: 1) Points; 2) Head-to-head points; 3) Head-to-head goal difference; 4) Head-to-head goals scored; 5) Goal difference in all games; 6) Goals scored in all games (Note: calculation by criteria indicated in rules 2, 3, 4 is conducted with consideration of all teams that have an equal number of tournament points at the moment of calculation and not only among those which after preliminary criteria have appeared more successful).

=== Results ===
Home \ Away	AHR	BUK	EPC	KAR	KHU	MET	NBU	NYV	POD	PRY
Ahrobiznes Volochysk		3–0	1–1	0–1	3–0	3–1	1–0	2–1	0–0	1–1
Bukovyna Chernivtsi	1–0		0–2	0–1	0–0	1–0	3–3	0–1	0–2	1–0
Epitsentr Kamianets-Podilskyi	1–1	2–1		3–2	3–1	2–2	0–2	2–3	2–2	1–1
Karpaty Lviv	3–0	2–1	2–0		1–0	3–0	1–1	3–0	2–1	3–3
FC Khust	0–1	1–2	0–1	0–3		1–2	0–1	2–0	2–1	1–2
Metalist Kharkiv	1–2	2–3	0–1	0–3	0–3		1–1	0–0	1–1	0–1 (Note: Scheduled on 9 September 2023, the match has been moved to 7 October 2023 due to Metalist released its players to play for junior national teams. The match was played on 11 October 2023.)
Nyva Buzova	2–1	1–0	0–2	0–1	2–2	0–0		2–1	2–1	0–1
Nyva Ternopil	0–0	0–1	1–2	1–1	4–1	0–1	2–0		0–0	1–0
Podillya Khmelnytskyi	0–1	1–1	0–0	0–1	4–1	1–0	0–2	2–0		1–1
Prykarpattia Ivano-Frankivsk	2–0	2–1	2–2	0–1	7–0	1–2	2–2	0–0	1–1	

Source: Calendar (in Ukrainian)
Legend: Blue = home team win; Yellow = draw; Red = away team win.

=== Group A results by week ===
Team ╲ Round	1	2	3	4	5	6	7	8	9	10	11	12	13	14	15	16	17	18
Ahrobiznes Volochysk	L	W	D	W	D	D	L	L	D	W	W	D	W	W	W	L	W	L
Bukovyna Chernivtsi	L	L	D	W	L	W	L	W	D	W	L	W	L	D	W	L	L	L
Epitsentr Kamianets-Podilskyi	W	W	D	D	L	L	W	D	L	D	W	D	D	W	W	W	D	W
Karpaty Lviv	W	W	W	D	W	W	W	W	D	W	W	D	W	W	L	W	W	W
Khust	L	L	D	L	L	W	D	W	W	L	L	L	L	L	L	L	L	L
Metalist Kharkiv	L	L	D	W	L	L	D	L	D	L	L	L	D	L	L	W	D	W
Nyva Buzova	W	W	W	D	W	D	D	D	W	L	W	L	L	D	L	W	D	L
Nyva Ternopil	W	W	L	L	W	D	L	L	D	L	D	W	D	L	L	D	W	L
Podillia Khmelnytskyi	D	L	D	D	D	L	W	L	D	D	L	W	D	L	W	D	L	W
Prykarpattia Ivano-Frankivsk	D	L	L	L	W	D	D	D	D	D	W	D	W	W	W	L	D	W

Source: pfl.ua
W = Win; D = Draw; L = Loss

=== Group A goalscorers ===
As of 24 November 2023

Rank	Scorer	Team	Goals (Pen.)
1	(Ukraine) Andriy Khoma	Prykarpattia Ivano-Frankivsk	12 (0)
2	(Brazil) Igor Neves	Karpaty Lviv	8 (1)
2	(Ukraine) Vasyl Palahnyuk	Bukovyna Chernivtsi	8 (3)
4	(Ukraine) Ruslan Palamar	Nyva Buzova	7 (4)
5	(Ukraine) Maksym Hirnyi	Epitsentr Kamianets-Podilskyi	6 (2)
6	4 players		5
11	3 players		4
14	17 players		3
31	17 players		2
48	41 players		1

=== Group A clean sheets ===
As of 24 November 2023

Rank	Player	Club	Clean sheets
1	(Ukraine) Andriy Kozhukhar	Karpaty Lviv	12
2	(Ukraine) Maksym Mekhaniv	Nyva Ternopil	7
2	(Azerbaijan) Andrey Popovich	Ahrobiznes Volochysk	7
4	1 player		5
5	2 players		4
7	2 players		3
9	5 players		2
14	3 players		1

== Group B league table ==
Pos	Team	Pld	W	D	L	GF	GA	GD	Pts	Promotion, qualification or relegation
1	Inhulets Petrove	18	13	3	2	41	13	+28	42	Qualified to the Promotion group
2	Livyi Bereh Kyiv	18	11	3	4	40	11	+29	36	Qualified to the Promotion group
3	Mariupol	18	8	7	3	22	14	+8	31	Qualified to the Promotion group
4	Viktoriya Sumy	18	8	6	4	19	18	+1	30	Qualified to the Promotion group
5	Poltava	18	8	5	5	35	27	+8	29	Qualified to the Promotion group
6	Metalurh Zaporizhzhia	18	6	7	5	23	18	+5	25	Qualified to the Relegation group
7	Hirnyk-Sport Horishni Plavni	18	5	2	11	16	32	−16	17	Qualified to the Relegation group
8	Kremin Kremenchuk	18	4	2	12	14	40	−26	14	Qualified to the Relegation group
9	Chernihiv-ShVSM	18	4	1	13	20	44	−24	13 (Note: Head-to-head points: Chernihiv 6, Dinaz 0)	Qualified to the Relegation group
10	Dinaz Vyshhorod	18	3	4	11	15	28	−13	13	Qualified to the Relegation group

Source: PFL.ua
Rules for classification: 1) Points; 2) Head-to-head points; 3) Head-to-head goal difference; 4) Head-to-head goals scored; 5) Goal difference in all games; 6) Goals scored in all games (Note: calculation by criteria indicated in rules 2, 3, 4 is conducted with consideration of all teams that have an equal number of tournament points at the moment of calculation and not only among those which after preliminary criteria have appeared more successful).

=== Results ===
Home \ Away	CHE	DIN	HIS	INH	KRE	LBK	MAR	MET	POL	VIK
Chernihiv-ShVSM		3–2	1–0	0–2	2–3	0–3	0–1 (Note: The match Chernihiv–Mariupol was postponed due to the Russian attack with ballistic missile on the Chernihiv city center on August 19, 2023. The match was played on September 13, 2023.)	1–3	2–2	0–3
Dinaz Vyshhorod	1–2		3–1	0–2	2–1	0–0 (Note: The round 14 match between Dinaz and Livyi Bereh on October 29 was interrupted at 59 minute of play due to an air alarm with score 0:0. The PFL administration rescheduled the match for the next day October 30.)	1–2	1–0	1–1	0–1
Hirnyk-Sport	0–2	2–0		1–2	0–1	0–1	1–0	1–0	1–3	2–2
Inhulets Petrove	6–1	3–0	1–1		5–1	2–1	0–1	3–2	5–0	3–0
Kremin Kremenchuk	2–1	0–0	4–1	0–2		0–1	0–3	1–2	0–6	0–1
Livyi Bereh	5–1	3–0	5–0	3–0	6–0		1–1	1–0	1–3	5–0
Mariupol	3–1	2–1	2–3	1–1	1–0	0–2		2–2	1–1	0–0
Metalurh Zaporizhia	4–2	1–1	0–1	0–0	0–0	1–1	0–0		3–1	2–0
Poltava	2–0	2–1	4–1	1–3	4–1	2–1	0–2	1–2		2–2
Viktoriya Sumy	2–1	2–1	1–0	0–1	3–0	1–0	0–0	1–1	0–0	

Source: Calendar (in Ukrainian)
Legend: Blue = home team win; Yellow = draw; Red = away team win.

=== Group B results by week ===
Team ╲ Round	1	2	3	4	5	6	7	8	9	10	11	12	13	14	15	16	17	18
Chernihiv-ShVSM	W	L	L	L	L	L	L	W	L	W	L	L	L	L	L	L	W	D
Dinaz Vyshhorod	L	W	L	L	L	W	L	D	D	L	D	L	L	D	L	L	L	W
Hirnyk-Sport Horishni Plavni	L	W	W	L	L	L	L	L	L	L	W	W	L	D	W	L	L	D
Inhulets Petrove	W	W	W	W	D	W	W	W	W	W	W	W	L	L	D	W	W	D
Kremin Kremenchuk	D	L	L	W	L	W	L	L	L	L	D	L	W	L	W	L	L	L
Livyi Bereh Kyiv	W	L	W	L	W	D	D	W	L	W	L	W	W	D	W	W	W	W
Mariupol	D	L	D	D	D	W	W	D	W	D	L	W	W	W	L	W	D	W
Metalurh Zaporizhzhia	D	D	L	W	W	L	D	D	D	W	W	L	W	W	D	L	D	L
Poltava	L	W	D	L	W	D	W	D	W	L	W	L	L	W	D	W	W	D
Viktoriya Sumy	D	D	W	W	W	D	W	L	W	D	L	W	W	D	D	W	L	L

Source: pfl.ua
W = Win; D = Draw; L = Loss

=== Group B goalscorers ===
As of 25 November 2023

Rank	Scorer	Team	Goals (Pen.)
1	(Ukraine) Dmytro Shcherbak	SC Poltava	10 (2)
1	(Ukraine) Andriy Spivakov	Livyi Bereh Kyiv	10 (5)
3	(Ukraine) Vitaliy Koltsov	Inhulets Petrove	9 (6)
4	(Ukraine) Oleksandr Kozak	Inhulets Petrove	8 (0)
5	(Ukraine) Danyil Sukhoruchko	Livyi Bereh Kyiv	7 (0)
6	2 players		6
8	4 players		5
12	9 players		4
21	12 players		3
33	25 players		2
58	42 players		1

=== Group B clean sheets ===
As of 25 November 2023

Rank	Player	Club	Clean sheets
1	(Ukraine) Vitaliy Chebotaryov	Livyi Bereh Kyiv	8
1	(Ukraine) Illya Karavashchenko	FSC Mariupol	8
1	(Ukraine) Oleksiy Palamarchuk	Inhulets Petrove	8
4	1 player(s)		6
5	1 player(s)		4
6	5 player(s)		3
11	2 players		2
13	2 players		1

== Promotion group league table ==
Pos	Team	Pld	W	D	L	GF	GA	GD	Pts	Promotion, qualification or relegation
1	Inhulets Petrove (C, P)	28	21	4	3	60	17	+43	67	Promotion to Ukrainian Premier League
2	Karpaty Lviv (P)	28	20	5	3	49	20	+29	65	Promotion to Ukrainian Premier League
3	Livyi Bereh Kyiv (O, P)	28	16	6	6	59	21	+38	54	Qualification to promotion play-offs Qualification to mini tournament
4	Epitsentr Kamianets-Podilskyi	28	11	11	6	39	33	+6	44	Qualification to promotion play-offs Qualification to mini tournament
5	Prykarpattia Ivano-Frankivsk	28	10	10	8	35	30	+5	40 (Note: Head-to-head results: Nyva–Prykarpattia 0:1, Prykarpattia–Nyva 2:2)	
6	Kudrivka-Nyva	28	10	10	8	32	34	−2	40	merged with FC Kudrivka
7	Viktoriya Sumy	28	10	9	9	23	27	−4	39	
8	Ahrobiznes Volochysk	28	10	8	10	27	29	−2	38	
9	Mariupol	28	8	13	7	29	26	+3	37 (Note: Head-to-head results: Mariupol–Poltava 1:1, Poltava–Mariupol 0:2)	
10	Poltava	28	10	7	11	49	45	+4	37	

Source: PFL.ua
Rules for classification: 1) Points; 2) Head-to-head points; 3) Head-to-head goal difference; 4) Head-to-head goals scored; 5) Goal difference in all games; 6) Goals scored in all games (Note: calculation by criteria indicated in rules 2, 3, 4 is conducted with consideration of all teams that have an equal number of tournament points at the moment of calculation and not only among those which after preliminary criteria have appeared more successful).
(C) Champions; (O) Play-off winners; (P) Promoted

=== Promotion group results ===
Home \ Away	AHR	EPC	INH	KAR	LBK	MAR	NVB	POL	PRY	VKT
Ahrobiznes Volochysk			1–0		0–2	1–1		3–1		0–0
Epitsentr Kamianets-Podilskyi			1–3		1–1	1–1		3–2		3–1
Inhulets Petrove	3–0	1–0		2–1			0–0		4–0	
Karpaty Lviv			1–2		3–3	3–1		2–1		1–0
Livyi Bereh Kyiv	3–0	2–1		0–1			1–2		1–1	
Mariupol	1–1	0–1		1–2			0–0		1–1	
Kudrivka-Nyva			0–3		1–5	1–1		2–2		2–0
Poltava	2–1	0–0		0–1			2–3		3–0	
Prykarpattia Ivano-Frankivsk			0–1		0–1	1–0		3–1		1–0
Viktoriya Sumy	1–0	1–1		0–0			1–0		0–1	

Source: Calendar (in Ukrainian)
Legend: Blue = home team win; Yellow = draw; Red = away team win.

=== Promotion group results by week ===
Team ╲ Round	1	2	3	4	5	6	7	8	9	10
Ahrobiznes Volochysk	D	L	W	L	D	L	L	L	W	D
Epitsentr Kamianets-Podilskyi	D	D	W	L	D	W	W	D	L	L
Inhulets Petrove	W	D	L	W	W	W	W	W	W	W
Karpaty Lviv	W	W	W	W	L	W	D	W	D	L
Kudrivka-Nyva	L	D	D	D	W	W	L	W	D	L
Livyi Bereh Kyiv	W	W	W	L	D	L	W	D	D	W
Mariupol	D	D	L	D	D	L	L	L	D	D
Poltava	L	D	D	W	L	L	L	L	L	W
Prykarpattia Ivano-Frankivsk	L	D	L	W	W	L	W	D	W	L
Viktoriya Sumy	D	L	L	L	L	W	D	D	L	W

Source: pfl.ua
W = Win; D = Draw; L = Loss

=== Promotion group goalscorers ===
As of 25 May 2024

Rank	Scorer	Team	Goals (Pen.)
1	Andriy Khoma	Prykarpattia Ivano-Frankivsk	14 (0)
1	Dmytro Shcherbak	SC Poltava	14 (4)
3	Artem Sitalo	Inhulets Petrove	12 (0)
3	(Brazil) Igor Neves	Karpaty Lviv	12 (2)
3	Andriy Spivakov	Livyi Bereh Kyiv	12 (5)
6	Danylo Kravchuk	Epitsentr Kamianets-Podilskyi	11 (0)
7	Danyil Sukhoruchko	Livyi Bereh Kyiv	10 (0)
7	Vitaliy Koltsov	Inhulets Petrove	10 (6)
9	Oleksandr Kozak	Inhulets Petrove	9 (0)
10	Valeriy Sad	Metalurh → Inhulets	8 (3)
11	2 player(s)		7
13	8 player(s)		6
21	6 player(s)		5
27	12 player(s)		4
39	15 player(s)		3
54	25 player(s)		2
79	47 players		1

=== Promotion group clean sheets ===
As of 25 May 2024

Rank	Player	Club	Clean sheets
1	Andriy Kozhukhar	Karpaty Lviv	16
2	Oleksiy Palamarchuk	Inhulets Petrove	14
3	Maksym Mekhaniv	Nyva T. → Livyi Bereh	10
4	Illya Karavashchenko	FSC Mariupol	9
4	Oleksandr Lytvynenko	Viktoriya Sumy	9
4	Andriy Popovych	Ahrobiznes Volochysk	9
7	1 player(s)		8
8	1 player(s)		6
9	4 player(s)		4
13	2 player(s)		3
15	2 player(s)		2
17	3 player(s)		1

== Relegation group league table ==
Pos	Team	Pld	W	D	L	GF	GA	GD	Pts	Promotion, qualification or relegation
11	Bukovyna Chernivtsi	28	12	5	11	38	29	+9	41	
12	Podillia Khmelnytskyi	28	9	12	7	36	26	+10	39	
13	Nyva Ternopil	28	9	9	10	29	29	0	36	
14	Metalist Kharkiv	28	7	9	12	27	34	−7	30 (Note: Head-to-head points: Metalist 4, Dinaz 1)	
15	Dinaz Vyshhorod	28	8	6	14	31	38	−7	30	
16	Khust	28	9	2	17	34	53	−19	29	Qualification to relegation play-off (both later avoided relegation)
17	Metalurh Zaporizhzhia	28	7	7	14	27	48	−21	28	Qualification to relegation play-off (both later avoided relegation)
18	Kremin Kremenchuk	28	6	7	15	20	48	−28	25	Avoided relegation
19	Chernihiv-ShVSM (R)	28	6	5	17	34	66	−32	23 (Note: Head-to-head points: Chernihiv 6, Hirnyk-Sport 0)	Relegation to Ukrainian Second League
20	Hirnyk-Sport Horishni Plavni (R)	28	6	5	17	24	49	−25	23	Relegation to Ukrainian Second League

Source: PFL.ua
Rules for classification: 1) Points; 2) Head-to-head points; 3) Head-to-head goal difference; 4) Head-to-head goals scored; 5) Goal difference in all games; 6) Goals scored in all games (Note: calculation by criteria indicated in rules 2, 3, 4 is conducted with consideration of all teams that have an equal number of tournament points at the moment of calculation and not only among those which after preliminary criteria have appeared more successful).
(R) Relegated

=== Relegation group results ===
Home \ Away	BUK	CHE	DIN	HIR	XST	KRE	MET	MTZ	NYV	POD
Bukovyna Chernivtsi		4–0	0–1	1–1		0–1		2–0		
Chernihiv-ShVSM	1–5				0–2		2–1		3–3	2–2
Dinaz Vyshhorod	0–2				1–0		0–0		2–0	1–1
Hirnyk-Sport Horishni Plavni	2–3				0–2		0–0		0–1	1–1
Khust		2–4	1–7	4–2		1–0		3–0 (Note: On April 25, 2024 it became known that Metalurh Zaporizhia won't be able to appear for the away game against Khust due to many players either injured or sick. The club has informed the Ukrainian PFL about its situation. On 2 May 2024 the UAF CDC adopted decision to award technical victory 3:0 to Khust and technical loss 0:3 to Metalurh for its no show to the scheduled match.)		
Kremin Kremenchuk	0–0				1–0		0–0		0–0	1–1
Metalist Kharkiv		1–1	2–0	1–2		2–1		4–1		
Metalurh Zaporizhzhia	0–5				1–4		0–3		0–2	1–0
Nyva Ternopil		0–0	1–4	2–0		1–1		4–0		
Podillia Khmelnytskyi		2–1	3–0	2–0		3–1		3–1		

Source: Calendar (in Ukrainian)
Legend: Blue = home team win; Yellow = draw; Red = away team win.

=== Relegation group results by week ===
Team ╲ Round	1	2	3	4	5	6	7	8	9	10
Bukovyna Chernivtsi	W	W	D	D	W	L	W	L	W	W
Metalurh Zaporizhzhia	L	L	L	L	L	L	L	L	W	L
Podillia Khmelnytskyi	D	W	D	W	D	W	D	W	L	W
Nyva Ternopil	W	L	W	D	D	W	L	W	D	D
Khust	W	W	W	W	L	W	W	L	L	L
Hirnyk-Sport Horishni Plavni	L	L	D	D	D	L	L	W	L	L
Dinaz Vyshhorod	L	W	D	L	W	W	W	L	D	W
Metalist Kharkiv	D	W	D	W	L	W	W	L	D	D
Kremin Kremenchuk	D	L	D	L	D	L	D	W	W	D
Chernihiv-ShVSM	D	L	L	D	W	L	L	W	D	D

Source: pfl.ua
W = Win; D = Draw; L = Loss

=== Relegation group goalscorers ===
As of 25 May 2024

Rank	Scorer	Team	Goals (Pen.)
1	Vasyl Palahnyuk	Bukovyna Chernivtsi	14 (5)
2	Yevheniy Ryazantsev	Metalist Kharkiv	10 (0)
3	Pavlo Fedosov	FC Chernihiv	9 (1)
4	1 player(s)		8
5	3 player(s)		6
8	4 player(s)		5
12	11 player(s)		4
23	14 player(s)		3
37	36 player(s)		2
73	56 player(s)		1

=== Relegation group clean sheets ===
As of 25 May 2024

Rank	Player	Club	Clean sheets
1	Ivan Ponomarenko	Bukovyna Chernivtsi	8
2	2 player(s)		7
4	2 player(s)		6
6	2 player(s)		5
8	1 player(s)		3
9	3 players		2
12	9 players		1

== Awards ==
=== Monthly awards ===
Month	Player of the Month		Ref.
Month	Player	Club	Ref.
August 2023	(Ukraine) Vladyslav Voytsekhovskyi	Livyi Bereh Kyiv	
September 2023	(Ukraine) Nazar Prykhodko	Khust	
October 2023	(Ukraine) Ambrosiy Chachua	Karpaty Lviv	
March 2024	(Ukraine) Vladyslav Chaban	Khust	
April 2024	(Ukraine) Yevhen Pidlepenets	Karpaty Lviv	

=== Round awards ===
Fall half

Round	Player			Coach		
Round	Player	Club	Reference	Coach	Club	Reference
Round 1	(Ukraine) Oleksandr Kozak	Inhulets Petrove		(Ukraine) Vladyslav Lupashko	Inhulets Petrove	
Round 2	(Ukraine) Vyacheslav Shevchenko	Dinaz Vyshhorod		(Ukraine) Volodymyr Sysenko	SC Poltava	
Round 3	(Ukraine) Ruslan Dedukh	Livyi Bereh Kyiv		(Ukraine) Vitaliy Pervak	Livyi Bereh Kyiv	
Round 4	(Ukraine) Mykhaylo Shershen	Inhulets Petrove		(Ukraine) Andriy Anishchenko	Metalist Kharkiv	
Round 5	(Ukraine) Andriy Khoma	Prykarpattia Ivano-Frankivsk		(Ukraine) Anatoliy Bezsmertnyi	Viktoriya Sumy	
Round 6	(Ukraine) Dmytro Yeremenko	Dinaz Vyshhorod		(Ukraine) Volodymyr Tsytkin	FC Khust	
Round 7	(Ukraine) Oleksandr Tsybulnyk	Podillia Khmelnytskyi		(Ukraine) Vitaliy Kostyshyn	Podillia Khmelnytskyi	
Round 8	(Ukraine) Nazar Prykhodko	FC Khust		(Ukraine) Vladyslav Lupashko (2)	Inhulets Petrove	
Round 9	(Ukraine) Mykyta Teplyakov	FSC Mariupol		(Ukraine) Oleh Krasnopyorov	FSC Mariupol	
Round 10	(Brazil) Igor Neves	Karpaty Lviv		(Ukraine) Myron Markevych	Karpaty Lviv	
Round 11	(Ukraine) Serhiy Sten	Epitsentr Kamianets-Podilskyi		(Ukraine) Volodymyr Mykytin	Metalurh Zaporizhia	
Round 12	(Ukraine) Danyil Sukhoruchko	Livyi Bereh Kyiv		(Ukraine) Oleh Krasnopyorov (2)	FSC Mariupol	
Round 13	(Ukraine) Simon Galoyan	Kremin Kremenchuk		(Ukraine) Vitaliy Pervak (2)	Livyi Bereh Kyiv	
Round 14	(Ukraine) Vasyl Palahnyuk	Bukovyna Chernivtsi		(Ukraine) Oleh Krasnopyorov (3)	FSC Mariupol	
Round 15	(Ukraine) Andriy Spivakov	Livyi Bereh Kyiv		(Ukraine) Serhiy Nahornyak	Epitsentr Kamianets-Podilskyi	
Round 16	(Ukraine) Yevheniy Ryazantsev	Metalist Kharkiv		(Ukraine) Vitaliy Pervak (3)	Livyi Bereh Kyiv	
Round 17	(Ukraine) Pavlo Fedosov	FC Chernihiv		(Ukraine) Valeriy Chornyi	FC Chernihiv	
Round 18	(Ukraine) Maksym Hirnyi	Epitsentr Kamianets-Podilskyi		(Ukraine) Vitaliy Pervak (4)	Livyi Bereh Kyiv	
winter break

Spring half

Round	Player			Coach		
Round	Player	Club	Reference	Coach	Club	Reference
winter break
Round 1	(Ukraine) Pavlo Polehenko	Karpaty Lviv		(Ukraine) Vitaliy Pervak (5)	Livyi Bereh Kyiv	
Round 2	(Ukraine) Andriy Andreychuk	Bukovyna Chernivtsi		(Ukraine) Oleksandr Holovko	Dinaz Vyshhorod	
Round 3	(Ukraine) Yevhen Pidlepenets	Karpaty Lviv		(Ukraine) Oleksandr Chyzhevskyi	Ahrobiznes Volochysk	
Round 4	(Ukraine) Bohdan Shmyhelskyi	SC Poltava		(Ukraine) Myron Markevych (2)	Karpaty Lviv	
Round 5	(Ukraine) Vasyl Palahnyuk (2)	Bukovyna Chernivtsi		(Ukraine) Vladyslav Lupashko (3)	Inhulets Petrove	
Round 6	(Ukraine) Andriy Kozhukhar	Karpaty Lviv		(Ukraine) Roman Loktionov	Kudrivka-Nyva	
Round 7	(Ukraine) Artem Sitalo	Inhulets Petrove		(Ukraine) Volodymyr Tsytkin (2)	FC Khust	
Round 8	(Ukraine) Vyacheslav Studenko	Hirnyk-Sport Horishni Plavni		(Ukraine) Vitaliy Kostyshyn (2)	Podillia Khmelnytskyi	
Round 9	(Ukraine) Roman Bodnia	Bukovyna Chernivtsi		(Ukraine) Vitaliy Pervak (6)	Livyi Bereh Kyiv	
Round 10	(Ukraine) Serhiy Panasenko	Inhulets Petrove		(Ukraine) Vladyslav Lupashko (4)	Inhulets Petrove	

== Relegation play-offs ==
The relegation play-offs were scheduled to take place between the 6th and 7th-placed teams in the Relegation group of the First League and the 2nd and 3rd-placed teams from the Second League. It was FC Khust and Metalurh Zaporizhia from the First League that qualified for the play-offs.

Team 1	Agg.	Team 2	1st leg	2nd leg
FC Khust	1 – 2	PFC Zviahel	1–1	0–1
UCSA Tarasivka	7 – 1	Metalurh Zaporizhzhia	3–1	4–0

=== First match-up ===
1 June 2024
12:00

FC Khust	1 – 1	PFC Zviahel
Stankovych 55'	Report	Fesenko 76'

Karpaty, Khust
Attendance: 0
Referee: Lyudmyla Telbukh
8 June 2024
13:00

PFC Zviahel	1 – 0	FC Khust
Tomandzoto 66'	Report	Byelimenko (yellow card) 65' (yellow-red card) 90+6'

Avanhard, Zviahel
Attendance: 1,200
Referee: Ihor Stashuk

Zviahel won 2–1 on aggregate and was promoted to the 2024–25 Ukrainian First League. Khust was relegated to the 2024–25 Ukrainian Second League. Due to the withdrawal of Druzhba Myrivka, Khust was reinstated. Later, Zviahel also withdrew.

=== Second match-up ===
1 June 2024
13:30

UCSA Tarasivka	3 – 1	Metalurh Zaporizhzhia
Makhniev 27' (pen.); Goulart 83'; Guerreiro 90+4'	Report	Humenyak 29'

Bannikov Stadium, Kyiv
Attendance: 150
Referee: Dmytro Osaulenko
8 June 2024
12:00

Metalurh Zaporizhzhia	0 – 4	UCSA Tarasivka
Kostyuchenko (yellow card) 31' (yellow-red card) 52'; Baranyuk (yellow card) 49' (yellow-red card) 88'	Report	Eseola 9'; Guerreiro 62'; Khovayko 86'; Yevdokymov 90+3'

Slavutych-Arena, Zaporizhzhia
Attendance: 0
Referee: Andriy Zaitsev

UCSA Tarasivka won 7–1 on aggregate and was promoted to the 2024–25 Ukrainian First League. Metalurh Zaporizhzhia was relegated to the 2024–25 Ukrainian Second League. Due to withdrawal of Dnipro-1, Metalurh was reinstated.

== Number of teams by region ==
Number	Region	Team(s)
3	Khmelnytskyi Oblast	Epitsentr, Podillia, and Ahrobiznes
3	Poltava Oblast	Hirnyk-Sport, Kremin and Poltava
2	Kyiv Oblast	Dinaz and Nyva
1	Chernihiv Oblast	Chernihiv
1	Chernivtsi Oblast	Bukovyna
1	Donetsk Oblast	Mariupol
1	Ivano-Frankivsk Oblast	Prykarpattia
1	Kharkiv Oblast	Metalist
1	Kirovohrad Oblast	Inhulets
1	Kyiv	Livyi Bereh
1	Lviv Oblast	Karpaty
1	Sumy Oblast	Viktoriya
1	Ternopil Oblast	Nyva
1	Zakarpattia Oblast	Khust
1	Zaporizhzhia Oblast	Metalurh

== See also ==
- 2023–24 Ukrainian Premier League
- 2023–24 Ukrainian Second League
- 2023–24 Ukrainian Football Amateur League
