= Oleksiy Palamarchuk =

Moldovan-Ukrainian footballer

Personal information
- Full name: Oleksiy Serhiyovych Palamarchuk
- Date of birth: 22 July 1991 (age 35)
- Place of birth: Bender, Soviet Union (now Moldova)
- Height: 1.95 m (6 ft 5 in)
- Position: Goalkeeper

Team information
- Current team: LNZ Cherkasy
- Number: 12

Youth career
- 2004–2005: Youth Sportive School #11 Odesa
- 2005–2007: Youth Sportive School #9 Odesa
- 2007–2010: Zelenyi Hay Voznesensk

Senior career*
Years	Team	Apps	(Gls)
2010–2011	Dnister Ovidiopol	15	(0)
2011–2014	Odesa	28	(0)
2014–2019	Balkany Zorya	127	(0)
2020–2022	Chornomorets Odesa	17	(0)
2022	Hirnyk-Sport Horishni Plavni	0	(0)
2022–2025	Inhulets Petrove	74	(0)
2025–	LNZ Cherkasy	25	(0)
- * Club domestic league appearances and goals as of 3 June 2026

Oleksiy Serhiyovych Palamarchuk (Ukrainian: Олексій Сергійович Паламарчук; born 22 July 1991) is a Ukrainian professional footballer who plays as a goalkeeper for LNZ Cherkasy.

== Career ==
Palamarchuk is a product of the Odesa Youth Football School System. He made his professional debut for Dnister Ovidiopol in 2009. In the beginning of 2020 Palamarchuk joined Chornomorets Odesa. On 25 June 2020, he made his league debut against Volyn Lutsk.

In the 2024–25 season, Palamarchuk playing for Inhulets Petrove set a record by saving 6 penalties in a row in UPL matches.

On 1 July 2025 Palamarchuk joined Ukrainian Premier League side LNZ Cherkasy.

== Honours ==
Inhulets Petrove

- Ukrainian First League: 2023–24

FC Balkany Zorya

- Ukrainian Amateur League: 2015, 2016
- Ukrainian Amateur Cup: Runner-Up 2015

Individual

- Most clean sheets in Ukrainian Premier League: 2025–26
