= Vladyslav Lupashko =

Ukrainian footballer

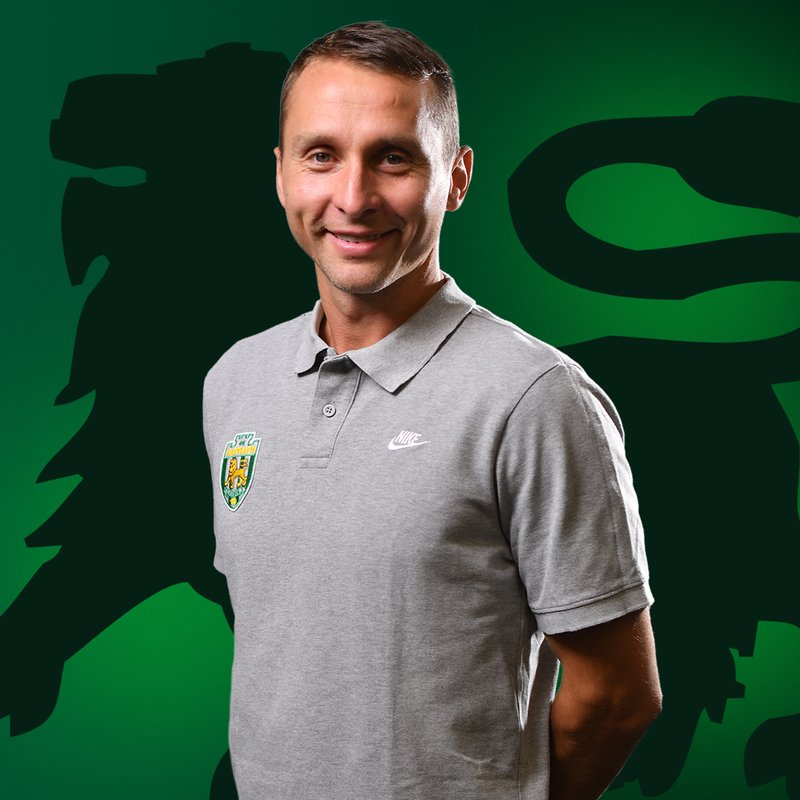
- Lupashko in 2024

Personal information
- Full name: Vladyslav Viktorovych Lupashko
- Date of birth: 4 December 1986 (age 39)
- Place of birth: Bilhorod-Dnistrovskyi, Soviet Union (now Ukraine)
- Height: 1.82 m (6 ft 0 in)
- Position: Central midfielder

Team information
- Current team: Lechia Gdańsk (manager)

Youth career
- 1999–2003: UFK Dnipropetrovsk

Senior career*
Years	Team	Apps	(Gls)
2003–2005	Borysfen Boryspil	16	(0)
2003–2004	→ Borysfen-2 Boryspil	20	(0)
2004	→ Boreks-Borysfen Borodyanka	5	(0)
2006–2008	Metalurh Donetsk	1	(0)
2008–2009	Knyazha Schaslyve	29	(1)
2009–2010	Lviv	46	(1)
2010–2012	Obolon Kyiv	74	(1)
2013	Bukovyna Chernivtsi	20	(0)
2013–2014	Illichivets Mariupol	1	(0)
2015–2017	Zirka Kropyvnytskyi	57	(1)
2017–2022	Inhulets Petrove	92	(0)
Total		361	(4)

Managerial career
- 2023–2024: Inhulets Petrove
- 2024: Karpaty Lviv U19
- 2024–2025: Karpaty Lviv
- 2026–: Lechia Gdańsk
- * Club domestic league appearances and goals

Vladyslav Viktorovych Lupashko (Ukrainian: Владислав Вікторович Лупашко; born 4 December 1986) is a Ukrainian professional football manager and former player. He is currently the manager of I liga club Lechia Gdańsk.

== Career ==
Lupashko is a product of the UFK Dnipropetrovsk youth sportive school and played for numerous Ukrainian clubs throughout his career.

In September 2013, he signed a contract with Illichivets Mariupol.

On 1 July 2026, Lupashko was appointed head coach of I liga club Lechia Gdańsk, replacing John Carver.

== Honours ==
=== Player ===
Zirka Kropyvnytskyi

- Ukrainian First League: 2015–16

Inhulets Petrove

- Ukrainian Cup runner–up: 2018–19

=== Managerial ===
Inhulets Petrove

- Ukrainian First League: 2023–24

Individual

- Ukrainian Premier League Coach of the Round: 2025–26 (Round 2)
