= Oleksandr Maksymov =

Ukrainian footballer (born 1985)

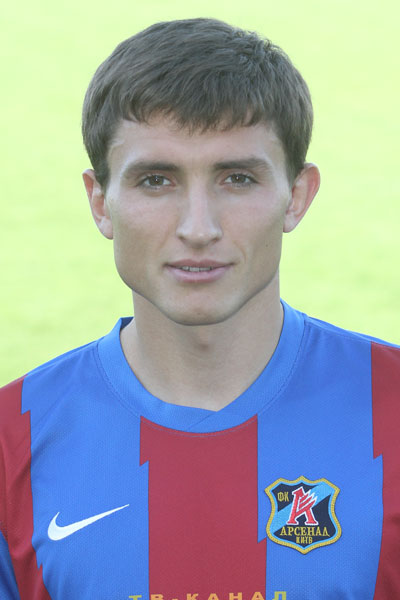

Personal information
- Full name: Oleksandr Oleksandrovych Maksymov
- Date of birth: 13 February 1985 (age 41)
- Place of birth: Zaporizhzhia, Ukrainian SSR, Soviet Union
- Height: 1.85 m (6 ft 1 in)
- Position: Midfielder

Team information
- Current team: Polissya-2 Zhytomyr (manager)

Youth career
- 1998–2000: Metalurh Zaporizhzhia
- 2000–2001: Obukhiv

Senior career*
Years	Team	Apps	(Gls)
2001–2002	Borysfen-2 Boryspil	23	(0)
2002–2003	Dynamo-2 Kyiv	5	(1)
2002–2003	Dynamo-3 Kyiv	23	(1)
2004	Metalist Kharkiv	10	(0)
2004	→ Metalist-2 Kharkiv	9	(1)
2005	Arsenal Kharkiv	14	(1)
2005–2007	Kharkiv	39	(1)
2007–2012	Dnipro Dnipropetrovsk	3	(0)
2008–2011	→ Kryvbas Kryvyi Rih (loan)	70	(10)
2011–2012	→ Arsenal Kyiv (loan)	18	(0)
2012	Arsenal Kyiv	3	(0)
2013	Kryvbas Kryvyi Rih	0	(0)
2013	Metalurh Zaporizhzhia	11	(0)
2014	Sevastopol	6	(0)
2014	Olimpik Donetsk	0	(0)
2015	Torpedo-BelAZ Zhodino	13	(2)
2016–2017	Pembroke Athleta	8	(0)
2018	Muzychi		
2019–2020	Juniors Shpytki		

International career^{‡}
2000	Ukraine U16	5	(3)
2001–2002	Ukraine U17	14	(1)
2003–2006	Ukraine U21	15	(0)
2005	Ukraine	1	(0)

Managerial career
- 2017: Livyi Bereh Kyiv (academy)
- 2018–2023: Shakhtar Donetsk (youth)
- 2023: LNZ Cherkasy (assistant)
- 2024–2025: Polissya Zhytomyr (U19 assistant)
- 2025: Polissya Zhytomyr (caretaker)
- 2025–: Polissya-2 Zhytomyr
Medal record
Men's football
Representing Ukraine
UEFA European Under-19 Championship
Bronze medal – third place	2004 Switzerland
UEFA European Under-21 Championship
Runner-up	2006 Portugal
- * Club domestic league appearances and goals as of 31 May 2017 ‡ National team caps and goals as of 10 August 2016

Oleksandr Maksymov (Ukrainian: Олександр Олександрович Максимов; born 13 February 1985) is a Ukrainian former footballer. Since 2017, Maksymov became a football coach and until 2020 played in local football competitions.

== Playing career ==
Maksymov spent most of his playing career in Ukraine, going abroad for a couple of seasons toward the end of his professional career.

Native of Zaporizhia, Maksymov is a product of Metalurh Zaporizhia sports school. In 2001, he signed with Dynamo Kyiv, where he played mostly for reserve teams. In 2004, Maksymov moved to Kharkiv, where he first played for Metalist, making his Ukrainian Premier League debut against Vorskla-Naftohaz Poltava on 25 July 2004 and then Arsenal Kharkiv. In 2005, Arsenal Kharkiv, after receiving its promotion to the Ukrainian Premier League, split with better players joining a new FC Kharkiv, while Arsenal was reorganized in lower leagues. Maksymov ended up in FC Kharkiv.

In summer 2007 he left FC Kharkiv signing with Dnipro Dnipropetrovsk.

He also played for Torpedo-BelAZ Zhodino in the Belarusian Premier League.

His last professional club was Pembroke Athleta in Malta.

=== National teams ===
From 2003 to 2006, Maksymov played at least 15 games for the Ukraine U21. He was on the Ukraine U21 squad when it was a finalist of the UEFA U-21 Cup, but the team lost to the Netherlands.

In 2005, Maksymov played his only game for the Ukraine national first team.

== Coaching career ==
Until 2022, Maksymov was a youth coach for a couple of football academies around Kyiv, like Livyi Bereh and Shakhtar. In 2023, he was on the coaching staff of Oleksandr Kovpak in LNZ. Since 2024, Maksymov has been a coach in FC Polissya Zhytomyr. Following the dismissal of Imad Ashur in May of 2025, Maksymov became the caretaker of the Polissya first squad.

== Honours ==
Arsenal Kharkiv

- 2004–05 Ukrainian First League runner-up

Ukraine under-21

- UEFA Under-21 Championship: runner-up 2006
