= Imad Ashur =

Ukrainian manager

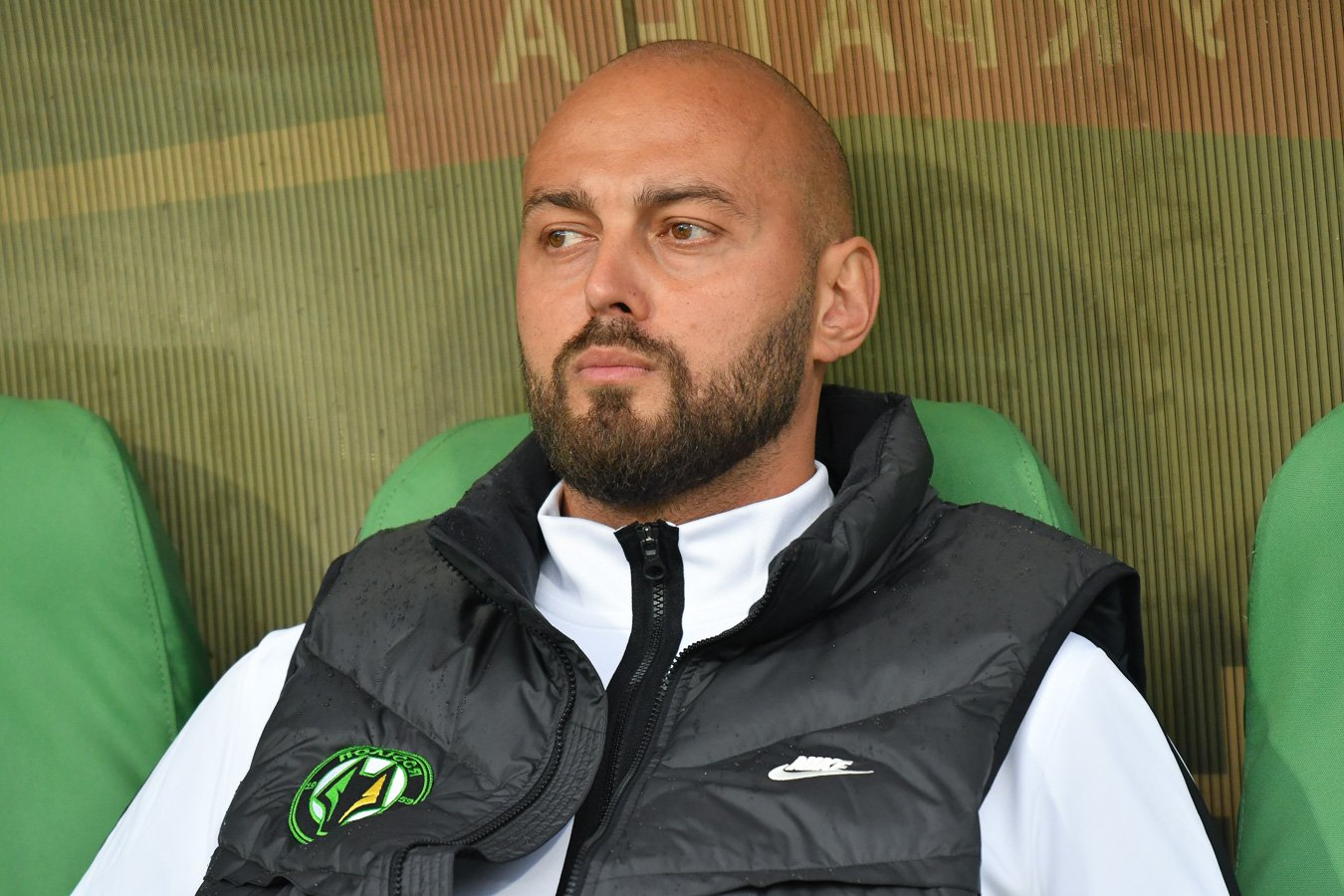

Personal information
- Full name: Imad Khaled Ashur
- Date of birth: 19 April 1988 (age 38)
- Place of birth: Odesa, Ukrainian SSR

Senior career*
Years	Team	Apps	(Gls)
- Homenetmen Beirut
- Real Odesa

Managerial career
- –2017: DYuFK Krok Odesa
- 2017–2019: Chornomorets Odesa (youth)
- 2019–2021: Aspire Academy (assistant)
- 2021–2022: Dnipro-1 (U19 assistant)
- 2023–2024: Dnipro-1 (U19)
- 2023: Dnipro-1 (assistant)
- 2023: Ukraine U17 (assistant)
- 2023–2024: Ukraine U21 (assistant)
- 2024–2025: Polissya Zhytomyr
- * Club domestic league appearances and goals

Imad Khaled Ashur (Ukrainian: Імад Халед Ашур; born 19 April 1988) is a Ukrainian professional football manager.

== Biography ==
Ashur was born in Odesa to parents from Lebanon. During his footballer career, Ashur played for the Armenian diaspora club Homenetmen Beirut in Lebanon as well as several Odesa-based amateur level clubs Evolution, Soborka, Real, Atletik.

In 2009 he graduated the Odesa University. Also, Ashur holds a UEFA A coaching license.

His coaching career Ashur started at children football club "Krok" from Odesa. In 2017–2019 he was a coach at the Chornomorets football academy (SDYuShOR). For short while he travelled abroad to Qatar and later returned to Ukraine joining the SC Dnipro-1 coaching staff. Since 2023, Ashur has been involved in coaching the Ukraine junior national football teams.

On 26 May 2024, it was announced that Imad Ashur was appointed the manager of the UPL club Polissya.

Ashur was honored as the UPL best coach of the month for September 2004.

On 12 May 2025, he was fired from the post of the Polissya head coach. Oleksandr Maksymov who was an assistant coach of Polissya under-19 team placed temporarily to perform his duties of head coach.
