= Oleh Shandruk =

Ukrainian footballer and manager (born 1983)

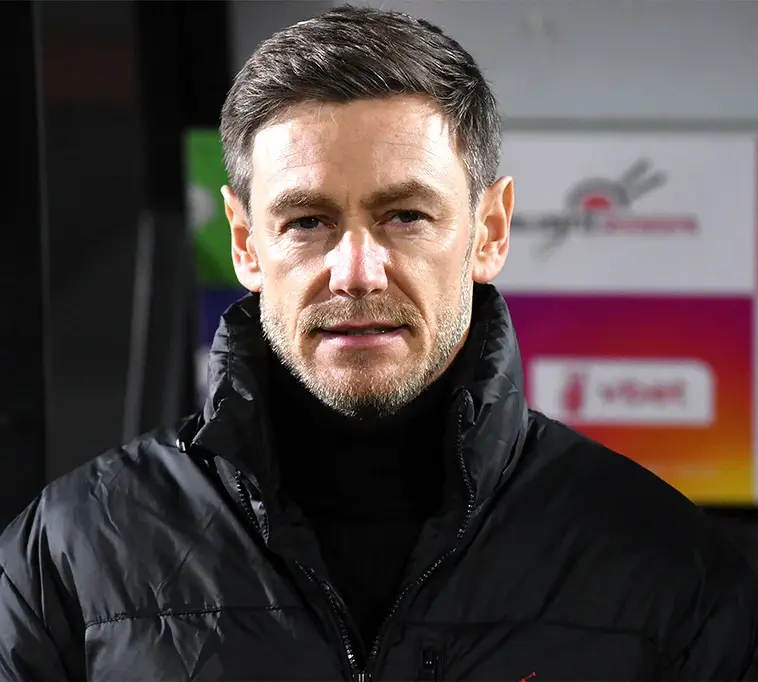

Personal information
- Full name: Oleh Mykolayovych Shandruk
- Date of birth: 30 January 1983 (age 43)
- Place of birth: Smyha, Soviet Union
- Height: 1.79 m (5 ft 10 1/2 in)
- Position: Defender

Team information
- Current team: Veres Rivne (manager)

Youth career
- 1998–2000: Temp Shepetivka

Senior career*
Years	Team	Apps	(Gls)
2000	Volyn Lutsk	10	(0)
2001–2005	Shakhtar Donetsk	0	(0)
2001–2004	→ Shakhtar-3 Donetsk	27	(3)
2001–2005	→ Shakhtar-2 Donetsk	86	(1)
2006–2007	Arsenal Kyiv	31	(1)
2007–2010	Chornomorets Odesa	67	(2)
2010	Volyn Lutsk	1	(0)
2010–2012	Sevastopol	38	(0)
2012–2013	Volyn Lutsk	20	(0)
2014	USK Rubin Donetsk	1	(0)
2014	Sokil Sadove	7	(1)
2014	ODEK Orzhiv	3	(0)
2014	Sokil Sadove	0	(0)
2015	ODEK Orzhiv	16	(0)
2019	Slaviia Velyka Omeliana	0	(0)
2019	Malynsk	2	(0)
2020–2024	Slaviia Velyka Omeliana	30	(3)
Total		339	(11)

Managerial career
- 2015–2018: ODEK Orzhiv
- 2018: Veres Rivne (assistant)
- 2018: Veres Rivne (caretaker)
- 2018–2019: Veres Rivne
- 2019: Malynsk (player-manager)
- 2020–2021: ODEK Orzhiv
- 2021–2023: Veres Rivne (U19)
- 2023–2024: Veres Rivne (youth academy director)
- 2023–2024: Veres Rivne (interim)
- 2024–: Veres Rivne
- * Club domestic league appearances and goals

Oleh Mykolayovych Shandruk (Ukrainian: Олег Шандрук, born 30 January 1983) is a Ukrainian retired professional footballer who played as a defender and current manager of Veres Rivne.
