= Nazar Prykhodko =

Ukrainian footballer

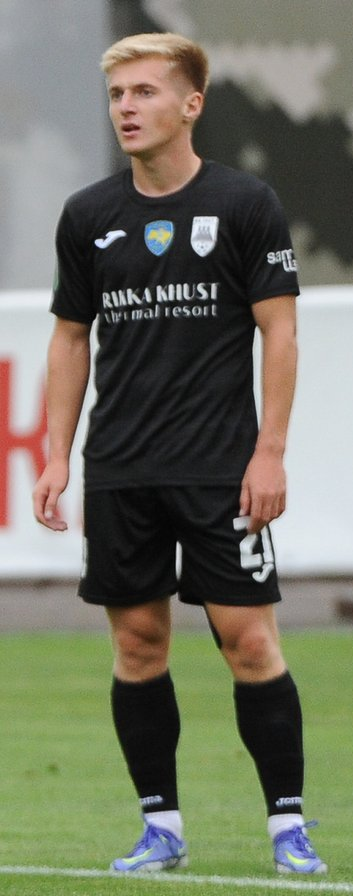

Personal information
- Full name: Nazar Viktorovych Prykhodko
- Date of birth: 12 November 2001 (age 24)
- Place of birth: Prylisne, Volyn Oblast, Ukraine
- Height: 1.66 m (5 ft 5 in)
- Position: Right midfielder

Team information
- Current team: Prykarpattia Ivano-Frankivsk
- Number: 22

Youth career
- 2016–2017: Styr Staryi Chortoryisk
- 2017–2018: Kovel-Volyn Kovel
- 2019: Rafalivka
- 2020–2021: Zorya-Myronivshchyny Myronivka

Senior career*
Years	Team	Apps	(Gls)
2021	Votrans Lutsk	7	(1)
2021	Dynamo Fastiv		
2022–2024	Khust	42	(7)
2024	UCSA Tarasivka	10	(0)
2025	Dinaz Vyshhorod	8	(0)
2025–26	Prykarpattia Ivano-Frankivsk	15	(0)
2026-	FC Inhulets Petrove	3	(0)
- * Club domestic league appearances and goals as of 22/10/26 @ 14:38(AEST)

Nazar Viktorovych Prykhodko (Ukrainian: Назар Вікторович Приходько; born 12 November 2001) is a Ukrainian professional footballer who plays as a right midfielder for Prykarpattia Ivano-Frankivsk.

== Career ==
Native of Volyn Oblast, Prykhodko is a product of Prylisne DYuSSh as well as few academies from Volyn and Kyiv regions. His first coach was Anatoliy Shylak. Prykhodko made his debut in an amateur club Votrans from Lutsk competing at regional competitions. In 2022 Prykhodko signed with Khust which was debuting at professional level and placed second earning promotional play-off where Prykhodko was a key contributor to the club's successes.

On 18 September 2023 he was recognized as a player of the week (round) in the First League.
