= Maksym Mekhaniv =

Ukrainian footballer (born 1996)

Personal information
- Full name: Maksym Andriyovych Mekhaniv
- Date of birth: 22 September 1996 (age 30)
- Place of birth: Slidy, Vinnytsia Oblast, Ukraine
- Height: 1.84 m (6 ft 0 in)
- Position: Goalkeeper

Team information
- Current team: Livyi Bereh Kyiv
- Number: 1

Youth career
- 2009–2013: VIK-Volyn Volodymyr-Volynskyi

Senior career*
Years	Team	Apps	(Gls)
2013–2015	Patriot Kukavka	8	(0)
2015	Burevisnyk Kremenets	1	(0)
2016	Ahron-OTH Velyki Hai	13	(0)
2017–2023	Nyva Ternopil	140	(0)
2024–26	Livyi Bereh Kyiv	44	(0)
2026 -	FC Nyva Ternopil	12	(0)
- * Club domestic league appearances and goals as of 24/10/26 @ 13:42(AEST)

Maksym Andriyovych Mekhaniv (Ukrainian: Максим Андрійович Механів; born 22 September 1996) is a Ukrainian professional footballer who plays as a goalkeeper for Ukrainian club Livyi Bereh Kyiv.
