= Danyil Sukhoruchko =

Ukrainian footballer

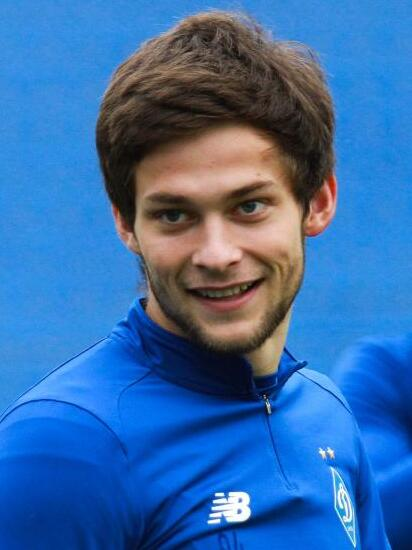
- Sukhoruchko in 2019

Personal information
- Full name: Danyil Anatoliyovych Sukhoruchko
- Date of birth: 21 February 2000 (age 26)
- Place of birth: Sloviansk, Ukraine
- Height: 1.91 m (6 ft 3 in)
- Position: Forward

Team information
- Current team: Poltava
- Number: 38

Youth career
- –2017: Dynamo Kyiv

Senior career*
Years	Team	Apps	(Gls)
2017–2022	Dynamo Kyiv	0	(0)
2018–2019	→ Arsenal Kyiv (loan)	1	(0)
2020–2022	→ Chornomorets Odesa (loan)	14	(2)
2022–2023	Nyva Ternopil	11	(1)
2023–2025	Livyi Bereh Kyiv	69	(11)
2026–	Poltava	13	(2)
- * Club domestic league appearances and goals as of 3 June 2026

Danyil Anatoliyovych Sukhoruchko (Ukrainian: Даниїл Анатолійович Сухоручко; born 21 February 2000) is a Ukrainian professional football player who plays for Poltava.

== Club career ==
He made his Ukrainian Premier League debut for FC Arsenal Kyiv on 8 December 2018 in a game against FC Zorya Luhansk.

== Honours ==
Dynamo Kyiv

- Ukrainian Super Cup: 2018
