= Oleksandr Tsybulnyk =

Ukrainian footballer

Oleksandr Tsybulnyk Олександр Цибульник
Personal information
- Full name: Oleksandr Serhiyovych Tsybulnyk
- Date of birth: 9 January 1993 (age 33)
- Place of birth: Kharkiv, Ukraine
- Height: 1.78 m (5 ft 10 in)
- Position: Midfielder

Team information
- Current team: Prykarpattia Ivano-Frankivsk
- Number: 5

Youth career
- 2008–2010: Metalist Kharkiv

Senior career*
Years	Team	Apps	(Gls)
2011–2016	Dynamo Kyiv	0	(0)
2013–2016	→ Dynamo-2 Kyiv	56	(1)
2016–2017	Cherkaskyi Dnipro	30	(0)
2017	Hapoel Nir Ramat HaSharon	6	(0)
2018	Dnepr Mogilev	4	(0)
2018	Ahrobiznes Volochysk	6	(0)
2019	Cherkashchyna	27	(0)
2020	Avanhard Kramatorsk	17	(0)
2021–2022	Podillya Khmelnytskyi	24	(1)
2022	Tomasovia Tomaszów Lubelski	13	(0)
2022	Odra Wodzisław Śląski	14	(1)
2023	FC Kolos Polonne		
2023–2024	Podillya Khmelnytskyi	37	(2)
2025–	Prykarpattia Ivano-Frankivsk	5	(0)

International career
2008–2010	Ukraine U17	13	(0)
- * Club domestic league appearances and goals as of 10 June 2025

Oleksandr Tsybulnyk (Ukrainian: Олександр Сергійович Цибульник; born 9 January 1993) is a Ukrainian professional footballer who plays as a midfielder for Prykarpattia Ivano-Frankivsk.
