= Andriy Spivakov =

Ukrainian footballer

Personal information
- Full name: Andriy Serhiyovych Spivakov
- Date of birth: 15 May 1995 (age 31)
- Place of birth: Kyiv, Ukraine
- Height: 1.84 m (6 ft 0 in)
- Position: Defensive midfielder

Team information
- Current team: Livyi Bereh Kyiv
- Number: 14

Youth career
- 2005–2009: Peremozhets Kyiv
- 2009–2010: Hart-Ros Irpin
- 2011: Zmina-Obolon Kyiv
- 2011–2012: Zirka Kyiv

Senior career*
Years	Team	Apps	(Gls)
2017	Zorya-Myronivshchyny Myronivka	7	(0)
2018–2020	Berkut-Lehion Brovary	16	(0)
2021	imeni Lva Yashyna Kyiv	9	(1)
2021–2022	Livyi Bereh Kyiv	18	(6)
2022	Jonava	10	(0)
2023–	Livyi Bereh Kyiv	34	(12)
- * Club domestic league appearances and goals as of 30 October 2024

Andriy Serhiyovych Spivakov (Ukrainian: Андрій Сергійович Співаков; born 15 May 1995) is a Ukrainian professional football player who plays for Livyi Bereh Kyiv.

== Club career ==
Native of Kyiv, Spivakov started his football career in hometown for sports schools and youth football clubs. In 2018 he also participated in the 4th European University Games in Portugal playing for the Hrinchenko Kyiv University football team.

He made his professional debut for Livyi Bereh Kyiv on 25 July 2021 in a third-tier home game against FC LNZ Cherkasy.
