= Oleksandr Povoroznyuk =

Ukrainian football club president and entrepreneur

- Born: 6 March 1971 (age 55); Novomanuylivka, Kirovohrad Oblast, Ukrainian SSR, Soviet Union (now Ukraine)
- Other occupation: Chairman of Inhulets Petrove

Oleksandr Hryhorovych Povoroznyuk (Ukrainian: Олександр Григорович Поворознюк; born 6 March 1971) is a general director of Ahrofirma Pyatykhatska LLC, and president of the football club Inhulets Petrove.

== Biography ==
Oleksandr Povoroznyuk was born on 6 March 1971 in the village of Novomanuylivka, Kirovohrad Oblast. He become the chairman of Pyatihatska Agricultural Company, which operates on 12,000 hectares of land and makes a profit of ₴12-15 million a year. He mentioned that he can spend 6-8 million a year on a team. He also become the chairman of the charity fund "With people and for people". Since 2017 he also become the Coach of Epicenter of the Kirovohrad Oblast and Member of the Village Revival Party.

=== Sports and patronage ===
In spring 2009 he became President of Desna Chernihiv, the football club of the city of Chernihiv, and business partners with the businessman Valeriy Korotkov. Povoroznyuk was ready to invest his own funds in the football club, but the local authorities, despite promises to support the club and complete the Chernihiv Stadium, did nothing. In the summer of 2010, Povoroznyuk abandoned Desna Chernihiv due to the club's debts.

In 2013 he created Inhulets Petrove, a football club from the town of Petrove in Kirovohrad Oblast. Under his leadership, the club won the Ukrainian Amateur Cup in 2014, competed in the 2015 Amateur Championship, successfully joined the Professional Football League of Ukraine and entered the Ukrainian Second League. Inhulets Petrove continued its participation among amateurs with its second team, FC Inhulets-2 Petrove. In their first season, the club was promoted to the Ukrainian First League. The club also competed at the 2015 UEFA Regions' Cup as "AF Pyatykhatska" representing Ukraine. In 2019, the club entered the final of the 2018–19 Ukrainian Cup. The game ended with a 4–0 defeat by Shakhtar Donetsk. At the end of the 2019-20 season, Inhulets was promoted to the Ukrainian Premier League for the first time in their history. Povoroznyuk signed players to reinforce the team such as Nika Sichinava, Illya Shevtsov and Pavlo Polehenko.

== In popular culture ==
A speech Povoroznyuk made addressing Ukrainian president Volodymyr Zelenskyy at the start of the full-scale Russian invasion of Ukraine became viral when it was mixed by the band Muesli UA (Мюслі UA) into the song "Vova, iBash ix Blyad" ("Вова, їбаш їх блять"), including quotes such as "there has never been such a president before / and there will not be another such president" and "I did not vote for you in the first round, but I'm ready to give up my life right now".

== See also ==
- FC Desna Chernihiv
- FC Inhulets Petrove
- FC Inhulets-2 Petrove
