= Vitaliy Pervak =

Ukrainian footballer and manager

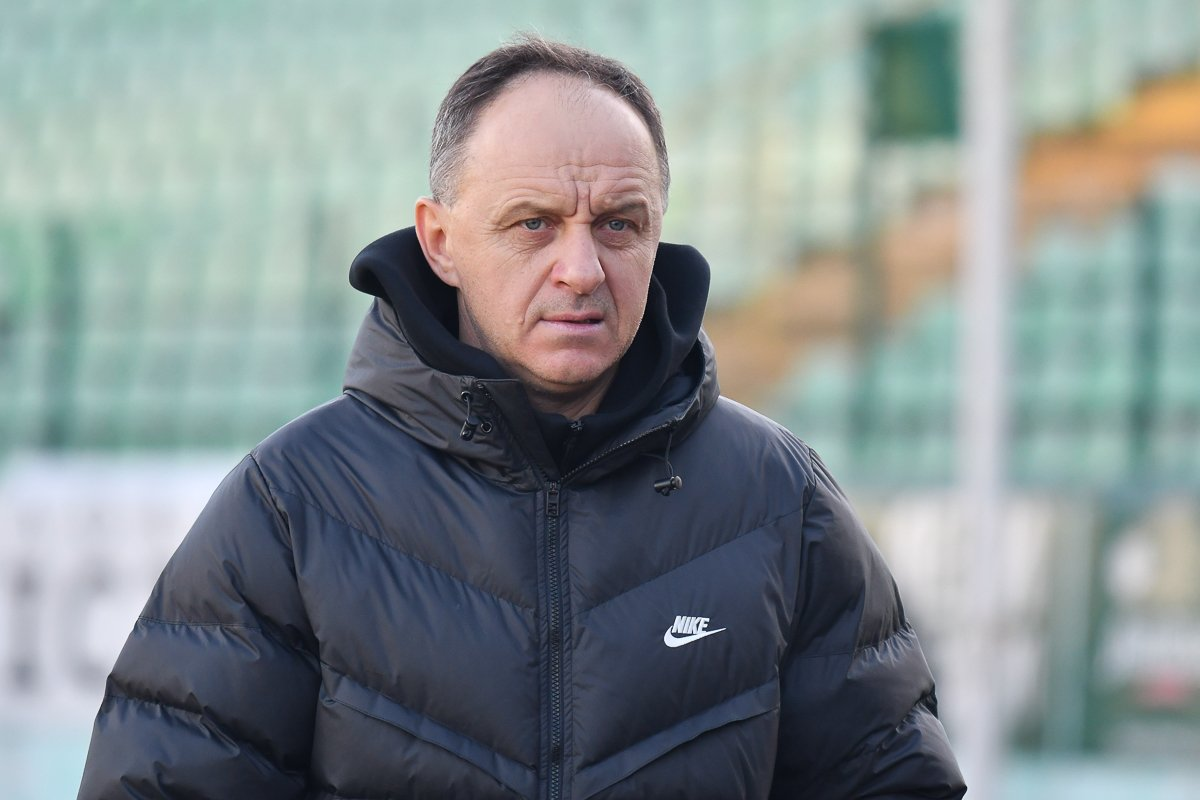

Personal information
- Full name: Vitaliy Mykolayovych Pervak
- Date of birth: 15 August 1970 (age 56)
- Place of birth: Starokostiantyniv, Ukrainian SSR
- Height: 1.80 m (5 ft 11 in)
- Position: Defender

Youth career
- Metalist Starokostiantyniv
- Podillya Kamianets-Podilskyi

Senior career*
Years	Team	Apps	(Gls)
1993	Sluch Krasyliv	6	(0)
1993–1995	Karpaty Mukacheve	65	(3)
1995–1996	Polihraftekhnika Oleksandriya	36	(2)
1996–1997	Volyn Lutsk	42	(3)
1997–1999	Nyva Ternopil	57	(2)
1999–2001	Prykarpattia Ivano-Frankivsk	45	(1)
1999–2000	→ Prykarpattia-2 Ivano-Frankivsk	3	(0)
2001–2003	Polihraftekhnika Oleksandriya	50	(2)
2003–2004	Nyva Vinnytsia	31	(0)
2004–2008	Oleksandriya	119	(3)
2008–2009	Nyva Ternopil	28	(2)
2009	Tovtry Kozliv		

Managerial career
- 2010–2013: Oleksandriya (assistant)
- 2013: Oleksandriya (caretaker)
- 2013–2021: Oleksandriya (assistant)
- 2021–2022: Nyva Ternopil (assistant)
- 2023–2025: Livyi Bereh Kyiv
- * Club domestic league appearances and goals

Vitaliy Mykolayovych Pervak (Ukrainian: Віталій Миколайович Первак; born 15 August 1970) is a Ukrainian former footballer and manager.
