= FC Inhulets Petrove =

Inhulets Petrove
- Full name: Football Club Ingulets Petrove
- Founded: 2013; 13 years ago
- Ground: Inhulets Stadium
- Capacity: 1,720
- Chairman: Oleksandr Povoroznyuk
- Head coach: Vasyl Kobin
- League: Ukrainian First League
- 2024–25: Ukrainian Premier League, 15th of 16 (relegated)
- Website: ingulets.club
Home colours	Away colours

Football Club Inhulets Petrove (Ukrainian: Інгулець Петрове) is a professional Ukrainian football club from the town of Petrove, Kirovohrad Oblast that competes in the Ukrainian First League. The club colours are yellow and red.

== History ==
The club was founded in the spring of 2013 under the name FC Ahrofirma Pyatykhatska Volodymyrivka because the team sponsorship was one of the largest agricultural enterprises of Kirovohrad region. The president of the club was also the enterprise's president – Oleksandr Povorozniuk who previously was a president of FC Desna Chernihiv. In their first season Ahrofirma Piatykhatska was runner up in the Kirovohrad Oblast Cup. In 2013–2014, the club competed in both Kirovohrad Oblast and Dnipropetrovsk Oblast regional football competitions.

Club President Oleksandr Povorozniuk initiated a children's football teams in every village of the Petrove Raion.

The club in 2014 competed in the Ukrainian Football Amateur League and were beaten finalists in the championship game.

In February 2015, the club was renamed to Inhulets. The club again competed in the 2015 Amateur Championship but during the season the club entered the professional ranks and joined the PFL entering into the Ukrainian Second League. Inhulets Petrove continued its participation among amateurs with its second team, FC Inhulets-2 Petrove.

In their first season, the club were promoted to the Ukrainian First League.

In 2015 Inhulets competed at the 2015 UEFA Regions' Cup as "AF Pyatykhatska" representing Ukraine.

One of its biggest achievements was its arrival at the final of the national cup. The game ended with a 4–0 defeat by Shakhtar Donetsk.

At the end of the 2019-20 season, Inhulets was promoted to the Ukrainian Premier League for the first time in their history.

== Gallery ==
2015–17 emblem

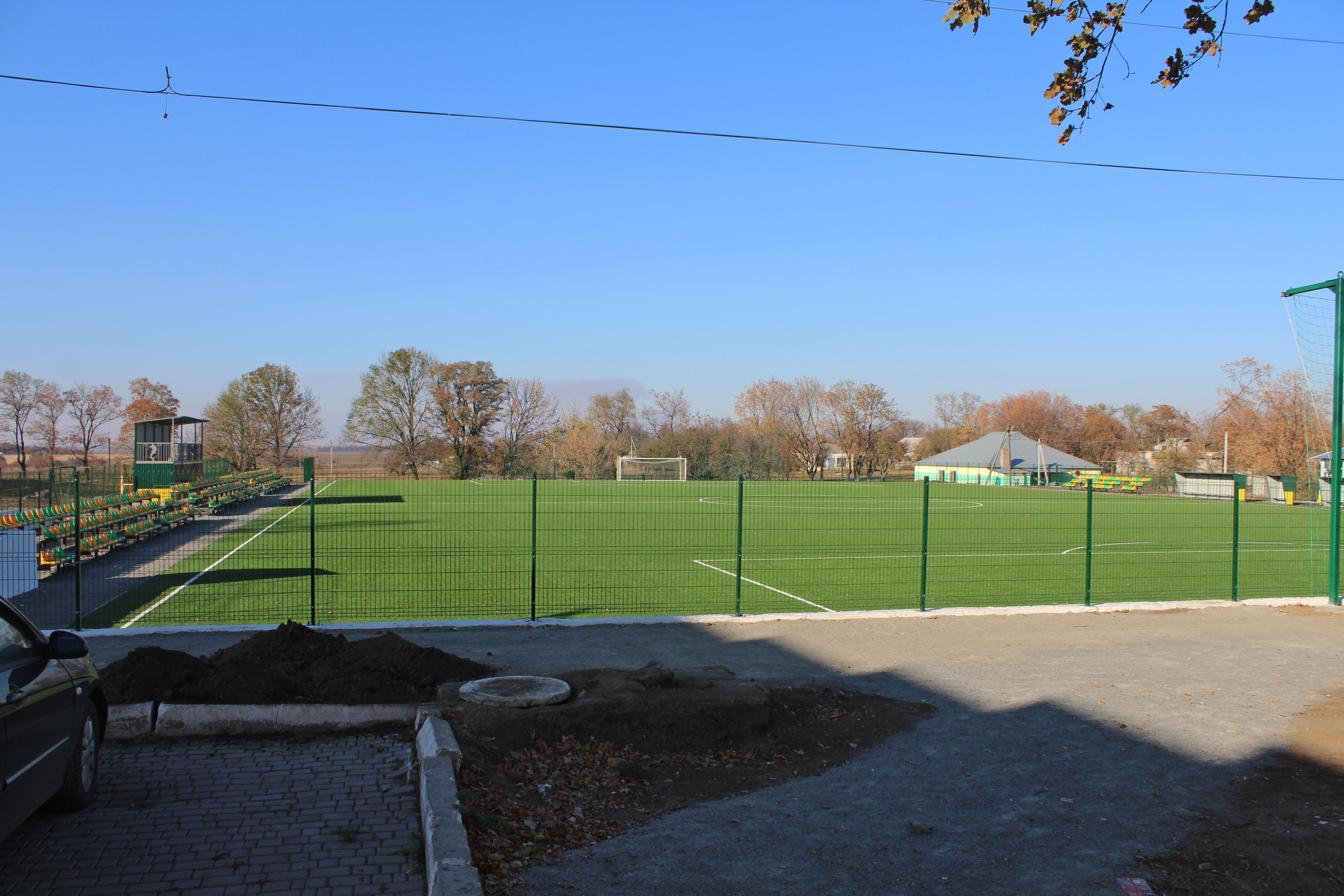
Povorozniuk Stadium in Volodymyrivka (original stadium)

== Honours and distinctions ==
=== Domestic competitions ===
- Ukrainian First League
  - Winners (1): 2023–24
- Ukrainian Cup
  - Runners–up (1): 2018–19
- Ukrainian Amateur Football Championship
  - Runners–up (1): 2014
- Ukrainian Amateur Cup
  - Winners (1): 2014
- Kirovohrad Oblast Championship
  - Winners (1): 2014
  - Runners–up (1): 2013

=== Individual Player & Coach awards ===
Best Player of Ukrainian First League

- (Georgia (country)) Nika Sichinava 2019–20

== League and cup history ==
Season	Div.	Pos.	Pl.	W	D	L	GS	GA	P	Domestic Cup	Other		Notes
AF Piatykhatska Volodymyrivka
2014	4th (Amateur Championship)	1	6	4	1	1	27	8	13	Amateur Cup; Winners			
2014	4th (Amateur Championship)	1	3	2	1	0	5	2	7	Amateur Cup; Winners			Runners up (Note: Lost the league final to FC Rukh Vynnyky)
Inhulets Petrove
2015	4th (Amateur Championship)	1	6	4	0	2	9	4	12	(Note: was fielding its second team FC Inhulets-2 Petrove)	RC	Group stage	
2015	4th (Amateur Championship)	2	10	6	0	4	16	8	18	(Note: was fielding its second team FC Inhulets-2 Petrove)	RC	Group stage	joined Druha Liha; replaced with FC Inhulets-2 Petrove
2015–16	3rd (Second League)	3_{/14}	26	14	8	4	37	16	50	1/16 finals	-	-	Promoted
2016–17	2nd (First League)	13_{/18}	34	10	8	16	33	45	38	1/32 finals	-	-	-
2017–18	2nd (First League)	4_{/18}	34	21	6	7	46	20	69	1/16 finals	-	-	-
2018–19	2nd (First League)	7_{/15}	28	11	9	8	35	32	42	Final	-	-	-
2019–20	2nd (First League)	3_{/16}	30	17	9	4	47	22	60	1/4 finals	-	-	Promotion to Ukrainian Premier League
2020–21	1st (Premier League)	12_{/14}	26	5	11	10	24	39	26	1/16 finals	-	-	-
2021–22	1st (Premier League)	14_{/16}	17	3	4	10	13	28	13	1/32 finals	-	-	All football competitions were suspended or abandoned on April 26 due to the 2022 Russian invasion of Ukraine.
2022–23	1st (Premier League)	14_{/16}	30	8	7	15	22	34	31	None	-	-	Relegated via play-offs LNZ Cherkasy 1–1 1–2
2023–24	2nd "Gr B" (First League)	1_{/10}	18	13	3	2	41	13	42	1/32 finals	-	-	Qualified to the Promotion group
2023–24	2nd "PRO" (First League)	1_{/10}	28	21	4	3	60	17	67	1/32 finals	-	-	Promotion to Ukrainian Premier League
2024–25	1st (Premier League)	15_{/16}	30	5	9	16	21	47	24	1/16 finals	-	-	Relegation to Ukrainian First League
2025–26	2nd (First League)	5_{/16}	30	12	10	8	41	32	46	1/4 finals	-	-	-
2026–27	2nd (First League)	8_{/16}	10	4	2	3	10	11	14	1/32 finals	-	-	TBD

== Players ==
=== Current squad ===
As of 10 September 2026

Note: Flags indicate national team as defined under FIFA eligibility rules; some limited exceptions apply. Players may hold more than one non-FIFA nationality.

No.	Pos.	Nation	Player
2	DF	UKR	Stanislav-Nuri Malysh
3	DF	UKR	Marat Dzyubin
4	DF	UKR	Vitaliy Dubiley
5	DF	UKR	Yehor Dankovskyi
6	DF	UKR	Oleksandr Komar
7	FW	UKR	Dmytro Bezkleynyi
8	DF	UKR	Artem Benedyuk
9	FW	UKR	Yehor Knyazev
10	MF	UKR	Stanislav Ursolov
11	FW	UKR	Yevheniy Profatylo
14	MF	UKR	Nazar Prykhodko
17	MF	UKR	Tymofiy Khussin
21	MF	UKR	Oleh Manastyrnyi

No.	Pos.	Nation	Player
22	DF	UKR	Danylo Yanyuk
24	GK	UKR	Oleksii Slutskyi
25	MF	UKR	Vitaliy Rozhko
26	GK	UKR	Dmytro Karlyuk
30	MF	UKR	Danylo Tuzenko
35	DF	UKR	Daniel Banyk
52	FW	UKR	Oleksandr Zhadan
59	MF	UKR	Bohdan Mohylnyi
69	MF	UKR	Yevhen Yanovich
78	FW	UKR	Oleksandr Yevtushenko
88	GK	UKR	Timofiy Molokopeyev
91	MF	UKR	Yaroslav Ryazantsev
97	DF	UKR	Danylo Arkusha

=== Out on loan ===
Note: Flags indicate national team as defined under FIFA eligibility rules; some limited exceptions apply. Players may hold more than one non-FIFA nationality.

No. / Pos. / Nation / Player	No. / Pos. / Nation / Player

== Europe competitions ==
In 2015, "Ingulets" competed at the 2015 UEFA Regions' Cup as "AF Pyatykhatska" representing Ukraine. Entering the competition at the intermediate group stage (total 3 stages) and playing in Moldova, the team was not able to qualify for final tournament in the Republic of Ireland.

Games of AF Pyatykhatska in UEFA competitions
Season	Competition	Round	Club	Home	Away	Aggregate
2015	UEFA Regions' Cup	Group 5	Catalonia	—	0–4	3rd
2015	UEFA Regions' Cup	Group 5	(Northern Ireland) Eastern Region	—	0–4	3rd
2015	UEFA Regions' Cup	Group 5	(Moldova) Telenești	—	5–0	3rd

For the 2017 UEFA Regions' Cup where Ukraine was represented by a team of Kirovohrad Oblast (Kirovograd Region according to the UEFA), which was composed out of the Ingulets' reserve team, UEFA admitted the team under the name of "Ingulee, Kirovograd Region". Entering the competition again at the intermediate group stage which was played in Malta, the team was able to qualify for the final tournament in Turkey.

Games of Ingulee in UEFA competitions
Season	Competition	Round	Club	Home	Away	Aggregate
2017	UEFA Regions' Cup	Group 1	Ligue Paris Ile-de-France	—	2–1	1st
2017	UEFA Regions' Cup	Group 1	East West Central Scotland	—	3–0	1st
2017	UEFA Regions' Cup	Group 1	(Malta) Gozo	—	3–1	1st
2017	UEFA Regions' Cup	Group A	(Turkey) Istanbul	—	0–3	4th
2017	UEFA Regions' Cup	Group A	(Portugal) Lisboa	—	3–3	4th
2017	UEFA Regions' Cup	Group A	(Croatia) Zagreb	—	1–4	4th

== List of managers ==
- 2013 Valeriy Len
- 2013–2015 Ruslan Pereverziy
- 2015 Viktor Bohatyr
- 2015–2016 Eduard Khavrov
- 2016 Dmytro Kolodyn
- 2016–2022 Serhiy Lavrynenko
- 2022 Mladen Bartulović (interim)
- 2022– Serhiy Kovalets

=== Administrative and coaching staff ===
Administration	Coaching (senior team)	Coaching (U-21/U-19 team)
President – Oleksandr Povoroznyuk; First Vice-president – Mykola Zhurylo; Vice-president – Vitaliy Kozlovskyi; Chief of team – Yuriy Mansurov	Head coach – Vasyl Kobin; Assistant coach – Oleksandr Stakhiv; Assistant coach – Vyacheslav Kotlyar; Assistant coach – Volodymyr Popov; Goalkeeping coach – Yuriy Chumak; Head of soccer school – Volodymyr Rukosuyev	Head coach U21 –; Head coach U19 – Mykhaylo Lutsyshyn

== See also ==
- FC Inhulets-2 Petrove
