= Mykola Lavrenko =

- Микола Миколайович Лавренко
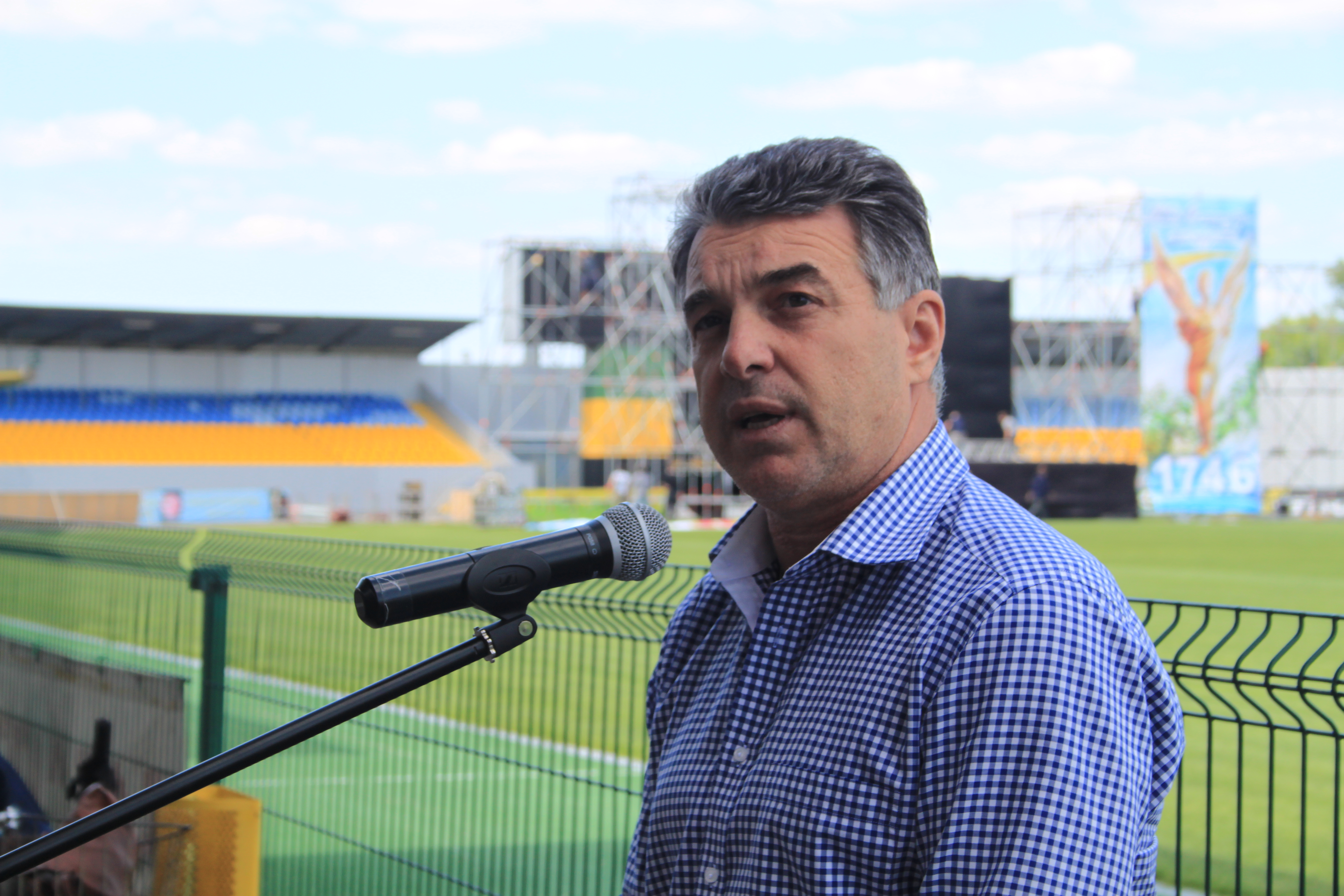
- Born: May 17, 1956 (age 70); Sevastopol, Crimean Oblast
- Education: Dnipropetrovsk Mining Institute
- Occupations: entrepreneur, government official
- Known for: Founder and chair of the FC Polihraftekhnika Oleksandria, FC Livyi Bereh Kyiv
- Political party: People's Democratic Party (2007)

Mykola Mykolyovych Lavrenko (Ukrainian: Микола Миколайович Лавренко: born May 17, 1956, in Sevastopol, Ukrainian SSR) is a Ukrainian government official, football investor and entrepreneur. He has chaired the association football club FC Oleksandriya, founded FC Livyi Bereh Kyiv and served as an acting president of the Professional Football League of Ukraine.

== Biography ==
Lavrenko was born in Sevastopol in 1956 to a family of sailors. In 1957, his family moved to Oleksandriya in Central Ukraine. Lavrenko began working as a mechanical assistant at the Oleksandriya Electrical and Mechanical Plant. He later climbed the engineering career ladder, from dispatcher to production manager. In 1982 he graduated from the Dnipropetrovsk Mining Institute, majoring in Machine Engineering Technology.

From 1984 to 1995, Lavrenko was a director of a printing equipment plant of the Manufacturing Association "Soyuzpoligraphprom" (Soviet Printing Industry) in Oleksandriya, and from 1995 to 1999 he was the chairman of the board of the OJSC Oleksandriya Plant of Printing Equipment. In 1990 Lavrenko established a factory football team, Polihraftekhnika (now FC Oleksandriya) that entered Ukrainian football competitions among KFK (amateurs). In 2004 the club was reorganized as a city team and in 2014 was sold to a local agricultural company, UkrAhroKom.

Between 2000 and 2003 Lavrenko served as a first deputy head of the Kirovohrad Oblast State Administration, chaired by Vasyl Motsnyi. From 2003 to 2005, he headed the Vinnytsia Tax Administration.

In 2005 Lavrenko was appointed as first vice-president of VS Energy International Ukraine. During the winter of 2009–2010 he served as an acting president of the Professional Football League of Ukraine, while Svyatoslav Syrota was under investigation.

In 2017, Lavrekno created the football club Livyi Bereh in Kyiv alongside Mykola Pavlov.
