= FC Livyi Bereh Kyiv =

Livyi Bereh
- Full name: Football Club Livyi Bereh Kyiv
- Nickname: Leleky (Storks)
- Founded: 2017; 9 years ago
- Ground: Arena Livyi Bereh
- Capacity: 4,700
- Chairman: Mykola Lavrenko
- Head coach: Oleksandr Ryabokon
- League: Ukrainian Premier League
- 2025–26: Ukrainian First League, 3rd of 16 (promoted via play-offs)
- Website: fclb.com.ua
Home colours	Away colours	Third colours

The club coat of arms has an element of Desnianskyi Raion coat of arms, the white stork

Football Club Livyi Bereh Kyiv (Ukrainian: Футбольний клуб «Лівий берег» Київ) is a Ukrainian professional football club from Kyiv Oblast. The club is based at the Kyiv's Osokorky neighborhood located at the left-bank of Dnipro. It hosts its games in the Kyiv's suburb of Hnidyn (Zolochivska rural hromada), just outside of the city limits. In June 2021, the club was admitted to the Second League. In the 2025–26 season, the team played in the Ukrainian First League after relegation from Premier League.

== History ==
The club was created in September 2017 by Mykola Lavrenko, a former president of Polihraftekhnika Oleksandriya (today FC Oleksandriya) and retired Ukrainian manager Mykola Pavlov. To the club was also brought another Ukrainian manager Anatoliy Buznyk who is known for managing the Ukraine national student football team at Summer Universiades. Buznik in the club serves roles of both manager and sports director.

Livyi Bereh Kyiv made a late entry to national competition of the 2020–21 Ukrainian Football Amateur League replacing FC imeni Lva Yashina during winter break. The club made its debut at national level on 24 April 2021, hosting FC Olimpiya Savyntsi and beating it 2:1. The first goal was scored by Andriy Zaporozhan. The club managed somewhat to recover the poor record that it inherited from FC imeni Lva Yashina and finished 6th in its group.

Being accepted to the Ukrainian Second League, the club had listed several Ukrainian veteran footballers and Universiade winners, among which were Vitaliy Reva, Oleksandr Akymenko, Artem Starhorodskyi, Andriy Zaporozhan and others.

Their first game at the professional level, the club played on 25 July 2021 when it hosted LNZ Cherkasy and beat it 2:1. The first goal of the club at the professional level was scored by Andriy Zaporozhan. The club was placing 2nd among 15 teams in its group before the competition was forced to be paused due to the Russian full-scale invasion, and eventually scratched. The club decided to pause its operations and missed the next (2022–23) season. The Professional Football League (PFL) allowed several clubs to miss out on competitions due to the situation in the country.

In 2023, Livyi Bereh returned, joining the 2023 PFL Winter Cup, which was a short mid-season competition. In the summer of 2023, the PFL honored the second place that FC Livyi Bereh placed during the 2021–22 season, and the club was admitted to the First League. It finished the 2023–24 season third and qualified for promotion play-off. Livyi Bereh lost its face-off against another Kyiv club Obolon. While preparing for the next 2024–25 season, it was decided to play with 2 squads, one in the First League and the other in the Second League.

In July 2024 the club unexpectedly promoted to the Ukrainian Premier League. It took part in a Mini-Tournament play-offs that was created for an open spot in the competition due to the disappearing of SC Dnipro-1. It made it to the final of this tournament, where it defeated FC Mynai.

On 1 June 2025, Livyi Bereh secure relegation to Ukrainian First League from next season after defeat against Metalist 1925 on aggregate 0–2 and ended one year stay in top tier. They were promoted again the following season, beating Oleksandryia in the play-offs 2-1 on aggregate.

== Honours ==
- PFL Winter Cup
  - Winner: 2023

== Players ==
=== Current squad ===
As of 8 September 2026

Note: Flags indicate national team as defined under FIFA eligibility rules; some limited exceptions apply. Players may hold more than one non-FIFA nationality.

No.	Pos.	Nation	Player
2	DF	UKR	Oleh Sokolov
3	DF	UKR	Ivan Kotukha
4	DF	UKR	Valeriy Bondarenko
5	DF	UKR	Valeriy Samar
6	DF	BRA	Sidnney
7	FW	UKR	Dmytro Shastal
8	MF	UKR	Oleh Kryvoruchko
9	FW	BRA	Wendell
10	MF	BRA	Diego Andradina
11	FW	UKR	Illya Kvasnytsya (on loan from Karpaty Lviv)
12	GK	UKR	Roman Zhmurko
13	MF	UKR	Illya Kovalenko
14	DF	CAF	Séverin Tatolna
15	MF	UKR	Vikentiy Voloshyn

No.	Pos.	Nation	Player
17	MF	UKR	Nazariy Vorobchak
20	FW	SEN	Pape Malick Fall
21	FW	UKR	Nazar Voloshyn
22	MF	UKR	Vitaliy Tyshchenko
23	GK	UKR	Oleksandr Domoleha
25	MF	UKR	Serhiy Kosovskyi
27	DF	UKR	Ernest Astakhov
37	FW	UKR	Roman Heresh
38	MF	UKR	Artem Chelyadin
44	MF	UKR	Yevhen Banada (vice-captain)
74	GK	UKR	Denys Ihnatenko
90	DF	GHA	Nicholas Osei Bonsu
97	DF	UKR	Andriy Yakymiv

=== Other players under contract ===
Note: Flags indicate national team as defined under FIFA eligibility rules; some limited exceptions apply. Players may hold more than one non-FIFA nationality.

No. / Pos. / Nation / Player; — / DF / UKR / Bohdan Chuyev	No. / Pos. / Nation / Player

=== Out on loan ===
Note: Flags indicate national team as defined under FIFA eligibility rules; some limited exceptions apply. Players may hold more than one non-FIFA nationality.

No. / Pos. / Nation / Player; — / MF / UKR / Simon Haloyan (at Chernihiv until 30 December 2026)	No. / Pos. / Nation / Player

== International players ==
Had international caps for their respective countries. Players whose name is listed in bold represented their countries while playing for Livyi Bereh Kyiv.

Ukraine

- (Ukraine) Mykola Ishchenko
- (Ukraine) Pavlo Ksyonz
- (Ukraine) Vitaliy Reva

Africa

- (Central African Republic) Séverin Tatolna

== Coaches and administration ==
Administration	Coaching
President – (Ukraine) Mykola Lavrenko; Honorary president – (Ukraine) Mykola Pavlov; Vice-president – (Ukraine) Ihor Matakov; Director of sports facilities – (Ukraine) Oleksandr Sakara	Head coach – (Ukraine) Oleksandr Ryabokon; Assistant – (Ukraine) Oleksandr Lomko; Assistant –; Goalkeeping coach – (Ukraine) Oleh Shevchenko; Fitness coach –

== Head coaches ==
- (Ukraine) Anatoliy Buznyk (1 August 2020 – 31 March 2022)
- (Ukraine) Vitaliy Pervak (1 January 2023 – 10 June 2025)
- (Ukraine) Andriy Havryushov (11 June 2025 – 23 September 2025)
- (Ukraine) Vyacheslav Nivinskyi (caretaker, 23 September 2025 – 5 october 2025)
- (Ukraine) Oleksandr Ryabokon (7 october 2025 – present)

== Reserves ==
=== Livyi Bereh-2 ===
On 19 June 2024 the club's website published its interview with Pavlo Kikot who managed the club's under-17 team that beside the national youth competition also participated in the Kyiv City Cup. He informed that the club's under-17 team is being reorganized into Livyi Bereh-2 for the 2024–25 Ukrainian Second League season to provide immediate reserve for the first team.

In 2024, FC Livyi Bereh Kyiv received a sudden promotion by winning a mini-tournament caused by the emergency withdrawal of SC Dnipro-1. Appearance of Livyi Bereh-2 was canceled, and the team was converted into the under-19 squad, which competed in the UPL under-19 competitions. The season was not successful for the club, and after a season in the top flight, Livyi Bereh was relegated. As a result, the club reanimated Livyi Bereh-2 for the 2025–26 Ukrainian Second League.

== League and cup history ==
Season	Div.	Pos.	Pl.	W	D	L	GS	GA	P	Domestic Cup	Europe		Notes
2020–21	**4th** "2" (Amateur League)	**6**_{/11}	20	8	1	11	30	52	**25**	-	-	-	Admitted to Ukrainian Second League
2021–22	**3rd** "A" (Second League)	**2**_{/15}	19	15	1	3	47	14	**46**	Second preliminary round (1/64)	-	-	Promoted to Ukrainian First League
2022–23	**2nd** (First League)	excused from participation											
2023–24	**2nd** "B" (First League)	**3**_{/20}	28	16	6	6	59	21	**54**	Fourth preliminary round (1/16)			Lost play-off to FC Obolon Kyiv 0:1 1:1 (0-2)
2023–24	**2nd** "B" (First League)	**1**_{/4}	2	1	1	0	4	1	**4**	Fourth preliminary round (1/16)			mini-tournament: FC Metalist 1925 Kharkiv 1–1 (5–4 p) FC Mynai 3:0, Promoted to Ukrainian Premier League
2024–25	**1st** (Premier League)	**14**_{/16}	30	7	5	18	18	39	**26**	Second preliminary round (1/32)	-	-	Relegated to Ukrainian First League Metalist 1925 Kharkiv 0:1 0:1 (0-2)
2025–26	**2nd** (First League)	**3**_{/16}	30	19	6	5	50	21	**63**	Round of 32 (1/16)	-	-	Promoted to Ukrainian Premier League through Relegation play-offs of 2025–26 Ukrainian Premier League:FC Oleksandriya 1:1 1:0 (2-1)
2026–27	**1st** (Premier League)	12_{/16}	4	0	4	0	2	2	4	Round of 16 (1/8)	-	-	TBD
