= 2024–25 FC Kremin Kremenchuk season =

22nd season in existence of Kremin FC

Kremin
2024–25 season
- President: Serhii Kovnir
- Head coach: Ihor Klymovskyi
- Stadium: Yunist Stadium
- Ukrainian First League: 17th (relegated)
- Ukrainian Cup: First preliminary round
- Top goalscorer: League: Myroslav Trofymiuk (3 goal); All: Myroslav Trofymiuk (3 goal)
- Biggest win: 1–0 vs Dinaz Vyshhorod (A), 20 September 2024, First League; 1–0 vs Mynai (H), 13 April 2025, First League
- Biggest defeat: 0–5 vs UCSA Tarasivka (A), 11 September 2024, First League

The 2024–25 season was Kremin's 22nd year in existence since clubs revival in 2003 and 6th consecutive season in the second flight of Ukrainian football. The club was relegated in the previous season, however they were brought back into the league due to other clubs withdrawing. In addition to the domestic league, Kremin participated in this season's editions of the Ukrainian Cup. The season covers the period from 20 June 2024 to 1 July 2025.

== Season summary ==
=== Pre-season ===
Having finished eighteenth in the Ukrainian First League the previous season, Kremin was relegated to Second League. With relegation the second team Kremin-2 ceased to exist. A number of players left the club: Orest Panchyshyn, Davronbek Azizov, Danylo Sydorenko, Artem Tovkach, Andrii Savitskyi, Andrii Hloba, Simon Galoyan. Loaned players Arsenii Korkodym and Artem Umanets returned to their parent clubs. On 13 June Kremin was assigned to group B of the Ukrainian Second League. The opening matches are planned for 5 August. Kremin announced that preseason training would begin on 20 June on Kremin Arena. Players began individual training on 10 June. Preseason is split into three stages. From 10 to 18, 20–30 June, the last stage is from 1–19 July. On 19 June defender Yurii Dudnyk moved to Bukovyna Chernivtsi after two years with the club. Goalkeeping coach Yuriy Chumak left Kremin to work at newly promoted, Ukrainian Premier League club Inhulets Petrove. On 20 June the team had its first preseason training at the Kremin–Arena. Twenty players from the team and recently dissolved Kremin-2 took part in training. Oleksii Zhdanovych and injured Yakiv Barinov were missing in training. Club announced that seven players and two coaches left the club. They included Korkodym, Azizov, Sydorenko, Dudnyk, Panchyshyn, Hloba and Umanets, coaches Chumak and Ruslan Umanets. Same day Nyva Ternopil announced Umanets as an assistant coach. Umantes was an assistant in nineteen matches while Chumak was in ten matches.

On 30 June Kremin won their first match of pre-season against Hirnyk-Sport 2–1, thanks to first-half goals from Kuts who converted a 3 penalty on third minute, Rokotyanskyi doubled the lead on fortieth minute. Three minutes after the start of second half Richmond pulled one back for Hirnyk-Sport. Five days later they won their second against Metalurh Zaporizhzhia. Molko won the game for Kremin with the lone goal in sixty-second minute.

=== October ===
On 3 October Kremin was scheduled to host Metalurh Zaporizhzhia in Mashynobudivnyk Stadium in Karlivka. Due to extended air raid alert in Poltava Oblast the math never started. This was the second time during the season that a match was postponed due to air raid.

=== December ===
In mid December, the club decided to disband the team and make all their player free-agents. Nine to eleven players had offers from other clubs. They planned to finish the spring part of the season with younger players from the academy and any released players who would not find new clubs. The coaching staff was all retained.

=== February ===
On February 20, the club returned back to training after the winter break. Twenty-six players were present at first training secession, including thirteen returning players. The club took part in winter cup. Friendly matches were planned against Budivelnyk, Hirnyk-Sport, MFC Kremin-2008, Ahrotekh Tyshkivka, Trostianets and Oleksandriia-2. Five players left the club by mutual consent. Oleksandr Dykhtiaruk joined Inhulets Petrove, Ivan Palamarchuk joined Nyva Ternopil. Stanislav Oksenenko and Ivan Zaichenko both joined LNZ Cherkasy while Myroslav Trofymiuk joined Prykarpattia Ivano-Frankivsk.

=== May ===
With two matches remaining, Kremin had to travel to Uzhhorod to play Mynai on 17 May. The club announced that due to lack of finances they will not make that trip. The league marked the match as Kremin failure to appear. Kremin sits in last place with six point behind the team in relegation play-off spot. Kremin director Andrii Fil announced that the club has no plans to withdraw from competition and plans to play its last home game against Podillia Khmelnytskyi. This was the first time in forty years that Kremin failed to travel to an away team. During the 1991 season they did not travel to Azerbaijan to face Karabakh Agdam and Dinamo Gandzha due to multiple clubs refusing to travel when First Nagorno-Karabakh War began. On May 27 after his contract expired Ihor Klymovskyi left Kremin.

=== June ===
As a result of winning only three matches, the club was relegated to the Second League. In mid June the club announced that they would not take part in the upcoming 2025–26 season. The club did not end the membership in Professional Football League of Ukraine.

== Management team ==
Ihor Klymovskyi remained as a manager for the new season.

Position	Name	Year appointed	Last club/team	References
Manager	(Ukraine) Ihor Klymovskyi	2023	DYuSSh Zmina Bila Tserkva	
Assistant Coach	(Ukraine) Yaroslav Zdyrko	2024	Kremin-2	
Goalkeeping Coach	(Ukraine) Yuriy Chumak	2024		

== Pre-season and friendlies ==
On 14 June three friendly matches against Hirnyk-Sport, SC Poltava and Oleksandriia-2 were announced. On 20 June Kremin released amended schedule with more opponents. SC Poltava was replaced by Metalurh Zaporizhzhia. Premier league club Vorskla and its newly recreated second team Vorskla-2 were added.

Win Draw Loss Fixtures

Results list Kremin's goal tally first.

Date	Opponent	Venue	Result	Kremin scorers	Referee
30 June 2024 – 12:00	Hirnyk-Sport	Away	2–1	Kuts 3' (pen.), Rokotyanskyi 40'	
5 July 2024 – 12:00	Metalurh Zaporizhzhia	Away	1–0	Molko 62'	Mykyta Bohatyr
13 July 2024 – 11:00	Oleksandriia-2	Away	1–2	Unnamed Trial Player 73'	
15 July 2024 – 12:10	Inhulets Petrove	Away	0–0		Yehor Kievlich
24 July 2024 – 10:00	FC Budivelnyk	Home	1–0	Kuts 87' (pen.)	Pavlo Plieshko
26 July 2024 – 11:30	Metalurh Zaporizhzhia	Away	1–0	Palamarchuk 17'	Mykyta Bohatyr
20 October 2024 – 16:00	FC Budivelnyk	Home	8–0	Kuts 5' (pen.), 31', Palamarchuk 17', Sabiiev 64', Rokotianskyi 68', Stetsiuk 71', Klepko 76', Dykhtiaruk 86'	
25 February 2025 – 19:30	FC Budivelnyk	Home	3–0	Rokotianskyi ?', Unnamed Trial Player ?', Unnamed Trial Player ?'	
2 March 2025 – 10:00	Hirnyk-Sport	Home	0–0		
7 March 2025 – 14:00	Trostianets	Home	1–1	Rokotianskyi 45'	
9 March 2025 – 12:30	Ahrotekh Tyshkivka	Home	1–3	Maksymenko 56'	
15 March 2025 – 12:00	Oleksandriia-2	Away	0–1		
18 March 2025 – 12:00	Penuel Kryvyi Rih	Home	4–2	Molko 17', Pokas 48', 50', Prokopchuk 46'	
22 March 2025 – 12:00	Oleksandriia-2	Away	0–0		
26 April 2025 – 12:00	Rokyta	Away	1–1	Maksymenko 12'	

== Competitions ==
=== Overall record ===
Start date of the league season was moved up one day to 4 August and Preliminary rounds of the Cup moved up two days to 28 July.

Competition	First match	Last match	Starting round	Final position	Record							
Competition	First match	Last match	Starting round	Final position	Pld	W	D	L	GF	GA	GD	Win %
First League	9 August 2024	23 May 2025	Matchday 1	17th (relegated)	23	3	5	15	14	42	−28	13.04
Ukrainian Cup	4 August 2024		First preliminary round	First preliminary round	1	0	0	1	0	2	−2	0.00
Total					24	3	5	16	14	44	−30	12.50

Last updated: 23 May 2025
Source: Competitions

=== First League ===
==== Results summary ====
Overall								Home						Away					
Pld	W	D	L	GF	GA	GD	Pts	W	D	L	GF	GA	GD	W	D	L	GF	GA	GD
21	3	5	13	13	37	−24	14	2	3	6	6	14	−8	1	2	7	7	23	−16

Last updated: 11 May 2025.
Source: ua-football.com

==== League table ====
Kremin played first sixteen matches in Group B. After finishing last in the group, they played second part of the season in relegation group.

===== Group B table =====
Pos	Team	Pld	W	D	L	GF	GA	GD	Pts	Promotion, qualification or relegation
5	Viktoriya Sumy	16	6	5	5	23	12	+11	23	Qualified to the Relegation group
6	Mariupol	16	5	3	8	17	23	−6	18	Qualified to the Relegation group
7	Metalurh Zaporizhzhia	16	4	5	7	15	22	−7	17	Qualified to the Relegation group
8	Dinaz Vyshhorod	16	3	4	9	12	28	−16	13	Qualified to the Relegation group
9	Kremin Kremenchuk	16	2	3	11	9	32	−23	9	Qualified to the Relegation group

Source: PFL.ua
Rules for classification: 1) Points; 2) Head-to-head points; 3) Head-to-head goal difference; 4) Head-to-head goals scored; 5) Goal difference in all games; 6) Goals scored in all games (Note: calculation by criteria indicated in rules 2, 3, 4 is conducted with consideration of all teams that have an equal number of tournament points at the moment of calculation and not only among those which after preliminary criteria have appeared more successful).

===== Relegation Group table =====
Pos	Team	Pld	W	D	L	GF	GA	GD	Pts	Promotion, qualification or relegation
14	Metalurh Zaporizhzhia	24	6	8	10	24	35	−11	26	Qualification to relegation play-off
15	Podillya Khmelnytskyi (O)	24	5	9	10	22	28	−6	24	Qualification to relegation play-off
16	Dinaz Vyshhorod (R)	24	3	8	13	19	46	−27	17	Relegation to Ukrainian Second League
17	Kremin Kremenchuk (R)	24	3	5	16	14	45	−31	14	Withdrawn after relegation
-	Khust (Note: FC Khust has withdrawn during the first stage and technically was not part of the relegation tournament.)	0	0	0	0	0	0	0	0	Withdrawn during the first stage of the tournament

Source: PFL.ua
Rules for classification: 1) Points; 2) Head-to-head points; 3) Head-to-head goal difference; 4) Head-to-head goals scored; 5) Goal difference in all games; 6) Goals scored in all games (Note: calculation by criteria indicated in rules 2, 3, 4 is conducted with consideration of all teams that have an equal number of tournament points at the moment of calculation and not only among those which after preliminary criteria have appeared more successful).
(O) Play-off winners; (R) Relegated

==== Matches ====
===== Group B =====
Win Draw Loss Fixtures

The league fixtures were announced on 31 July 2024.

Results list Kremin's goal tally first.

Date	Opponent	Venue	Result	Kremin scorers	Referee	Attendance	Position
9 August 2024 – 14:00	Metalurh Zaporizhzhia	Away	0–1		Anatolii Ukhov	0	7th
17 August 2024 – 13:00	Metalist 1925 Kharkiv	Home	1–1	Zlatiev 65'	Yehor Kievlich	0	7th
7 September 2024 – 13:00	Kudrivka	Away	1–2	Trofymiuk 18'	Serhii Podryhulia	0	9th
11 September 2024 – 12:30	UCSA Tarasivka	Away	0–5		Yaroslav Leskiv	79	9th
16 September 2024 – 14:30	Poltava	Away	2–4	Molko 60', Dykhtiaruk 74'	Veronika Vasylchenko	0	9th
20 September 2024 – 14:00	Dinaz Vyshhorod	Away	1–0	Trofymiuk 7'	Serhii Truba	0	8th
27 September 2024 – 14:00	Mariupol	Away	0–3 (Note: The match that originally ended 2–1 was changed to technical result by UAF Control and Disciplinary Committee on 3 October 2024 due to an ineligible player for Kremin.)	~~Molko 59'~~	Anatolii Ukhov	0	9th
9 October 2024 – 15:00	Metalist 1925 Kharkiv	Away	0–4		Liudmyla Telbukh	289	9th
14 October 2024 – 13:00	Viktoriia Sumy	Home	0–3		Veronika Vasylchenko	0	9th
25 October 2024 – 13:00	Kudrivka	Home	0–3		Maksym Skrypnyk	0	9th
30 October 2024 – 12:00	Metalurh Zaporizhzhia	Home	0–1		Yehor Kievlich	0	9th
4 November 2024 – 12:30	UCSA Tarasivka	Home	0–1		Mykyta Bohatyr	0	9th
8 November 2024 – 12:00	Poltava	Home	0–0		Oleksandr Tytov	0	9th
13 November 2024 – 12:00	Viktoriya Sumy	Away	1–1	Trofymiuk 18'	Kristina Kozoroh	0	9th
17 November 2024 – 12:00	Dinaz Vyshhorod	Home	0–3		Anatolii Ukhov	0	9th
27 November 2024 – 12:00	Mariupol	Home	3–0 (Note: On 27 November 2024 the postponed game between FC Kremin and FSC Mariupol was canceled due to financial hardship of the Mariupol team. The decision for the game result was determined by the UAF Control and Disciplinary Committee on 3 December 2024.)		Liudmyla Telbukh		9th

===== Relegation Group =====
Win Draw Loss Fixtures

The league fixtures for relegation group were announced on 5 December 2024.

Results list Kremin's goal tally first.

Date	Opponent	Venue	Result	Kremin scorers	Referee	Attendance	Position
31 March 2025 – 12:00	Nyva Ternopil	Home	1–2	Sydorenko 54'	Yehor Kievlich	0	17th
6 April 2025 – 12:30	Prykarpattia Ivano-Frankivsk	Away	1–2	Molko 57'	Ihor Sadkovskyi	150	17th
13 April 2025 – 11:00	Mynai	Home	1–0	Zhdanovych 36'	Veronika Vasylchenko	0	17th
19 April 2025 – 12:30	Podillia Khmelnytskyi	Away	1–1	Koloskov 37'	Vadym Zaprutniak		17th
3 May 2025 – 16:00	Nyva Ternopil	Away	1–3	Savitskyi 10'	Liudmyla Telbukh	280	17th
11 May 2025 – 12:00	Prykarpattia Ivano-Frankivsk	Home	0–0		Anatolii Ukhov	0	17th
17 May 2025	Mynai	Away	0–3 (Note: Kremin failed to travel.)		Yaroslav Leskiv		17th
23 May 2025 – 12:00	Podillia Khmelnytskyi	Home	0–2		Liudmyla Telbukh		17th

=== Ukrainian Cup ===
Kremin entered the First preliminary round and was drawn against Olympia Savyntsi. Match was scheduled to be played on 3 August.

Win Draw Loss Fixtures

Date	Opponent	Venue	Result	Kremin scorers	Referee
4 August 2024 – 13:00	Olympia Savyntsi	Away	0–2		Yevhenii Makarenko

== Statistics ==
=== Appearances and goals ===
As of 23 May 2025

The plus (+) symbol denotes an appearance as a substitute, hence 2+1 indicates two appearances in the starting XI and one appearance as a substitute. Players with zero appearances were unused substitutes named in at least one matchday squad.

No.	Pos	Nat	Player	Total		First League		Cup	
No.	Pos	Nat	Player	Apps	Goals	Apps	Goals	Apps	Goals
7	MF	(Ukraine) UKR	Bohdan Melnyk	3	0	0+3	0	-	-
10	MF	(Ukraine) UKR	Andrii Savitskyi	18	1	13+5	1	-	-
11	MF	(Ukraine) UKR	Valentyn Maksymenko	11	0	4+7	0	-	-
13	DF	(Ukraine) UKR	Danylo Sydorenko	7	1	7+0	1	-	-
14	MF	(Ukraine) UKR	Andrii Koloskov	6	1	1+5	1	0	0
15	MF	(Ukraine) UKR	Maksym Bondar	7	0	7+0	0	-	-
17	MF	(Ukraine) UKR	Oleksii Zhdanovych	18	1	17+0	1	1	0
18	MF	(Ukraine) UKR	Nazarii Pasternak	19	0	17+1	0	1	0
19	MF	(Ukraine) UKR	Heorhii Kovalskyi	7	0	5+2	0	-	-
22	GK	(Ukraine) UKR	Pavlo Lazarenko	0	0	0+0	0	-	-
23	DF	(Ukraine) UKR	Dmytro Prokopchuk	18	0	14+4	0	-	-
25	DF	(Ukraine) UKR	Mykhailo Klepko	1	0	0+1	0	0	0
26	MF	(Ukraine) UKR	Dmytro Pokas	3	0	3+0	0	0	0
27	MF	(Ukraine) UKR	Vladyslav Molko	20	2	19+0	2	1	0
40	GK	(Ukraine) UKR	Vadym Dmytrochenko	3	0	3+0	0	-	-
47	FW	(Ukraine) UKR	Anatolii Stetsiuk	12	0	2+10	0	0	0
51	MF	(Ukraine) UKR	Zlat Zlatiev	10	1	6+3	1	1	0
71	GK	(Ukraine) UKR	Artem Matus	14	0	13+0	0	1	0
72	DF	(Ukraine) UKR	Roman Tylokha	9	0	8+1	0	0	0
79	DF	(Ukraine) UKR	Andrii Borovskyi	23	0	22+0	0	1	0
91	DF	(Ukraine) UKR	Danylo Arkusha	10	0	4+6	0	-	-
Players have left the club
7	FW	(Ukraine) UKR	Myroslav Trofymiuk	16	3	15+0	3	0+1	0
8	MF	(Ukraine) UKR	Orest Panchyshyn	10	0	7+3	0	-	-
13	MF	(Ukraine) UKR	Viktor Bilokon	0	0	0+0	0	-	-
15	MF	(Ukraine) UKR	Yakiv Barinov	5	0	0+5	0	-	-
19	DF	(Ukraine) UKR	Dmytro Sabiiev	16	0	15+0	0	1	0
20	MF	(Ukraine) UKR	Stanislav Rokotyanskyi	12	0	6+5	0	1	0
21	DF	(Ukraine) UKR	Ivan Palamarchuk	14	0	13+0	0	1	0
29	DF	(Ukraine) UKR	Oleksandr Dykhtiaruk	15	1	14+0	1	1	0
32	MF	(Ukraine) UKR	Ivan Zaichenko	2	0	0+2	0	0	0
40	GK	(Ukraine) UKR	Stanislav Oksenenko	6	0	6+0	0	0	0
55	FW	(Ukraine) UKR	Ivan Kuts	9	0	0+8	0	1	0
57	DF	(Ukraine) UKR	Illia Rudniev	0	0	-	-	-	-

Last updated: 23 May 2025
Source: start.uaf.ua

== Transfers ==
=== In ===
Date	Pos.	Name	From	Fee	Ref.
2 August 2024	MF	(Ukraine) Andrii Koloskov	Unattached	Undisclosed	
2 August 2024	DF	(Ukraine) Andrii Borovskyi	Unattached	Undisclosed	
8 August 2024	MF	(Ukraine) Viktor Bilokon	Unattached	Undisclosed	
8 August 2024	MF	(Ukraine) Dmytro Prokopchuk	Unattached	Undisclosed	
6 September 2024	MF	(Ukraine) Valentyn Maksymenko	Unattached	Undisclosed	
26 September 2024	DF	(Ukraine) Illia Rudniev	Unattached	Undisclosed	

=== Out ===
Date	Pos.	Name	To	Fee	Ref.
12 June 2024	MF	(Ukraine) Andrii Hloba	Unattached	Released	
12 June 2024	DF	(Ukraine) Davronbek Azizov	Unattached	Released	
12 June 2024	DF	(Ukraine) Danylo Sydorenko	Unattached	Released	
12 June 2024	MF	(Ukraine) Orest Panchyshyn	Unattached	Released	
12 June 2024	GK	(Ukraine) Arsenii Korkodym	(Ukraine) Veres Rivne	Loan End	
12 June 2024	MF	(Ukraine) Artem Umanets	(Ukraine) Vorskla Poltava	Loan End	
June 2024	DF	(Ukraine) Artem Tovkach	Unattached	Released	
June 2024	MF	(Ukraine) Andrii Savitskyi	Unattached	Released	
June 2024	MF	(Ukraine) Simon Galoyan	Unattached	Released	
19 June 2024	DF	(Ukraine) Yurii Dudnyk	(Ukraine) Bukovyna Chernivtsi	Undisclosed	
19 July 2024	DF	(Ukraine) Yevhenii Kostiuk	Unattached	Mutual contract termination	
19 July 2024	MF	(Nigeria) Michael Obamina	Unattached	Mutual contract termination	
July 2024	DF	(Ukraine) Nazar Hontar	FC Budivelnyk	Undisclosed	
July 2024	MF	(Ukraine) Vadym Kurylo	Unattached	Undisclosed	
July 2024	DF	(Ukraine) Denys Kuriakov	Unattached	Undisclosed	
July 2024	MF	(Ukraine) Kostiantyn Pihariev	FC Budivelnyk	Undisclosed	
July 2024	MF	(Ukraine) Volodymyr Bezklynskyi	Unattached	Undisclosed	

=== Loan in ===
Date from	Date to	Pos.	Name	From	Ref.
6 September 2024	31 December 2024	MF	(Ukraine) Orest Panchyshyn	Bukovyna Chernivtsi	
