= Ukrainian PFL extra competitions =

Football Tournament

The Ukrainian PFL extra competitions lists number of competitions ran by the Professional Football League of Ukraine in addition to the seasonal double round-robin format.

Starting from 2009 the Ukrainian PFL introduced additional tournaments. In 2009 the president of the PFL, Sviatoslav Syrota, stated that the tournament was meant to become a traditional competition with a possibility of increasing the frequency of its occurrence as well as increasing the list of its participants. The club competition was officially presented and confirmed by the declarations of the Central Council of PFL #18 of July 17, 2009, and the Executive Committee of FFU #19 of July 24, 2009. All the administrative and organizational issues of the competition organization were secured by the PFL of Ukraine.

== Initial edition ==
The first edition of the competition consisted of two rounds with four teams participating in it. Each team represented each Division of the PFL together with a students' team. One of the interesting requirements of the first couple of editions of the tournament was that the players that participated in the competition could be older than 23 years. There were teams of the Ukrainian First League, the Ukrainian Second League Group A and B, and the Ukrainian Student Football League. In June 2009 there was another tournament of the same kind, with the First League members winning.

The first edition of the competition started from semi-finals, with the winners advancing to the final, and the losing teams to the match for third place. The second edition took place the same year, but later in summer at season's break. At the start of 2009-2010 football season there was a proposition to turn the competition into a club level competition for the members of the Second League. The proposition offered to split all participants into eight groups (some three, some four) and after home and away matches were played the first two teams would advance into the best of 16 round. There and in the quarterfinals the teams would play a single game with the home team drawn. In the semifinals teams would play by home and away principle and then enter the final game which would decide who is the winner.

== Reorganization (the 2010 League Cup) ==
By the end of the summer it was officially announced that the club tournament definitely would take place in the fall of 2009. The first edition of such competition was set to have participants out of the Second League as well as various amateur clubs. The first matches were scheduled on September 9. The participants were split in eight groups of three with the best two progressing into the next round of 16.

For the participation in the competition were allowed all the professional clubs that were active members of the PFL, the amateur clubs that were vouched for by their respective regional football federations, and some of the second squads of the First League clubs. The first official club competition consisted of five stages. The first stage was the group stage where participants were split in eight groups of three teams by regional principle. At that stage every team played two games with its of its opponents, home and away. All games were played in the fall. The winners of the groups were the home teams in the next round.

Two best teams advanced into the next stage where the participants resumed the competition in the spring. That stage and the next consisted of a single match. The winners of the semifinals were to be decided in two games which would advance into a single final game, taken place by the end of May. The draws for the next stage would be held upon the conclusion of the previous.

At the start of 2010 suddenly, the competition was on the brink of extinction with several clubs pulling their teams out of it. The competition's funds also were almost depleted. Luckily the new president of the League was able to find a new sponsor in face of Umbro and renaming the Cup's title as the Umbro League Cup. It was decided to continue with competition with the available participants.

The next season 2010-2011 of the tournament was rather indefinite and by the end of the August (August 26) 2010 was announced to be suspended for at least a month until the next meeting of the Central Council of PFL. Finally, the competition was never resumed and discontinued.

== The PFL winter cup and open tournament ==
In 2023, another president of the PFL Oleksandr Kadenko announced that there will be additional tournament introduced for the Second League (3rd tier) and amateur clubs. He expressed his hope that the event would become regular. Although his hopes were not completely realized in right before the winter break of the 2024-25 season, another competition was carried out for the 3rd tier clubs.

== Champions and top goalscorers ==
Cup of Ukrainian PFL

Season	Champion	Runner-up	3rd position	Top goalscorer
2009 (winter)	Druha B	Students	Druha A	Mykhaylo Serhiychuk, Roman Dorohan, Artem Sikulskyi – 2 goals (each)
2009 (summer)	Persha	Druha B	Druha A	

Ukrainian League Cup

Season	Champion	Runner-up	Losing semifinalists	Top goalscorer
2009–10	Nyva Vinnytsia	Hirnyk-Sport Komsomolsk	Myr Hornostaivka Illichivets-2 Mariupol	Ruslan Kachur, Dmytro Kozban, Oleksandr Polishchuk – 5 goals (each)

PFL Winter Cup

Season	Champion	Runner-up	3rd position	Top goalscorer
2023	Livyi Bereh Kyiv	Nyva Buzova	Druzhba Myrivka	Artem Hryshchenko – 4 goals

PFL open tournament

Season	Champion	Runner-up	3rd position	Top goalscorer
2024	Skala 1911 Stryi	FC Oleksandriya-2	Kolos-2 Kovalivka	Danylo Kolesnyk – 6 goals

== See also ==
- PFL
