= 2009–10 PFL League Cup =

2009–10 League Cup
Kubok Lihy
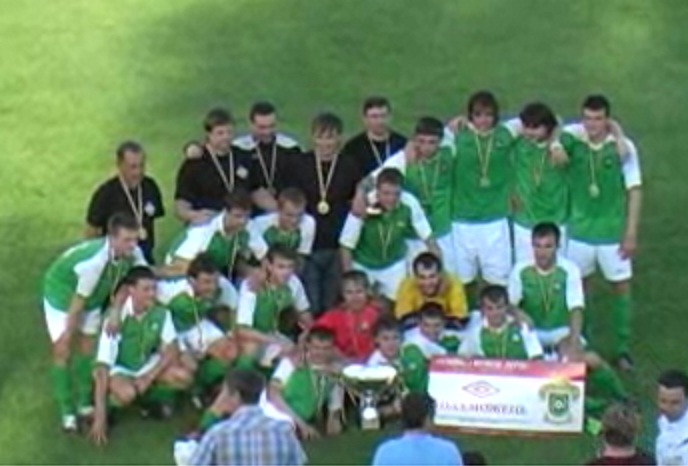
- Nyva players with the trophy

Tournament details
- Country: Ukraine
- Teams: 24

Final positions
- Champions: Nyva Vinnytsia
- Runners-up: Hirnyk-Sport Komsomolsk

Tournament statistics
- Matches played: 59
- Goals scored: 167 (2.83 per match)
- Top goal scorer(s): 5 – Kachur (Nyva); Kozban (Nyva); Polishchuk (Veres)

The 2009–10 PFL League Cup (Ukrainian: Кубок Ліги) was the Professional Football League of Ukraine football knockout competition designated for the members of the Ukrainian Second League and amateur clubs. In March of 2010, the sports apparel brand Umbro became a title sponsor of the competition, and it was renamed as the Umbro League Cup.

The tournament was organized when the PFL was chaired by Svyatoslav Syrota.

The competition was somewhat affected by the 2009 swine flu pandemic in Ukraine, and few matches had to be postponed.

== Historical scope ==
Earlier in 2009, a couple of mini-tournaments known as the PFL Cup took place. Those PFL Cup competitions involved participation of specially organized football teams, such as two from the second (for each group) and one from the first, as well as the Ukraine national student football team. The Second League team A was composed of players competing in the Second League Group A, while Second League team B had players competing in the Second League Group B; the First League team had players competing in the First League.

Those tournaments were supposed to be a regular event, but later in 2009 they were discontinued; instead, the Professional League organized a new competition under the same name, "League Cup", which was supposed to add more playtime for the 2009–10 Ukrainian Second League teams. A new working commission was organized in 2010 to offer an alternative to the Second League clubs' structure of competitions, which was supposed to be presented for the 2010–2011 season.

== Organization ==
In August of 2009, the PFL presented a draft of the competition, which consisted of two stages, group and knockout. The competition consisted of 24 teams, which included first teams of Second League clubs, second teams competing in the Second League, amateur teams, and a few reserve teams of First League clubs.

The group stage consisted of 8 groups, each containing 3 teams. The two best from each group would qualify for the knockout stage, Round of 16.

The winners of this competition were awarded the Cup and the prize money (150,000 Hryvnia) from Umbro, the general sponsor of the event.

Initially FC Luzhany (town of Luzhany, Chernivtsi Oblast) was set to participate in the competition, but was eventually replaced by FC Volyn-Tsement Zdolbuniv. On March 1, 2010, it was decided to suspend the competition due to a lack of funds. The clubs FC Dnister Ovidiopol, PFC Oleksandria, and FC Arsenal Bila Tserkva were represented in the competition by their junior teams (doubles). Several clubs officially quit the competition (FC Khodak Cherkasy, FC Dnister Ovidiopol, PFC Olexandria), while FC Dnipro-75 Dnipropetrovsk was excluded from the Professional Football League due to unpaid debts. The Rivne Oblast clubs (Veres and Volyn) and Teplovyk Yuzhnoukrainsk informed the PFL during the winter break of their unwillingness to continue in the competition.

=== After winter break ===
On March 16 it was decided to resume the competition. The following clubs were given until March 20 to pay off their debts to the referees: Teplovyk, Olexandria, Arsenal, Volyn-Tsement, Veres, Ros, Olympik, Tytan, and Dnipro-75. Umbro became the official partner of the competition and its title sponsor.

When the Second round pairs were formed, a few teams that finished last advanced due to numerous withdrawals of other clubs. Three teams (Lviv-2, Ros, and Myr) got a bye straight to the Quarter-finals.

=== Teams ===
- 2009–10 Ukrainian Second League (13/26): Bastion Illichivsk, Dnipro-75 Dnipropetrovsk, Hirnyk-Sport Komsomolsk, Illichivets-2 Mariupol, Karpaty-2 Lviv, Lviv-2, Morshyn, Nyva Vinnytsia, Olkom Melitopol, Ros Bila Tserkva, Stal Dniprodzerzhynsk, Shakhtar-3 Donetsk, Veres Rivne
- 2009–10 Ukrainian First League reserves (3/18): Arsenal Bila Tserkva, Dnister Ovidiopol, Oleksandriya
- AAFU-Amateurs (5): Khodak Cherkasy, ~~Luzhany~~, Myr Hornostaivka, Olimpik Kirovohrad, Zenit Boyarka
- Non-AAFU-Amateurs (3): Spartak Molodizhne, Teplovyk Yuzhnoukrainsk, Tytan Donetsk, (later Volyn-Tsement Zdolbuniv)

=== Location map ===
Locations of team home grounds

== Group stage ==
Key to colours in group tables
Advanced to the second round
Qualified, but withdrew
Expelled

=== Group A ===
Team	Pld	W	D	L	GF	GA	GD	Pts
LFC 2	4	2	1	1	6	2	+4	7
Karpaty-2	4	2	1	1	6	5	+1	7
Skala Morshyn	4	1	0	3	2	7	−5	3

	K2L	LV2	SKM
Karpaty-2	–	1–4	3–0
LFC 2	0–0	–	0–1
Skala Morshyn	1–2	0–2	–

=== Group B ===
Team	Pld	W	D	L	GF	GA	GD	Pts
Nyva Vinnytsia	4	4	0	0	11	3	+8	12
Veres Rivne	4	2	0	2	11	10	+1	6
Volyn Zdolbuniv	4	0	0	4	2	11	−9	0

	NYV	VRS	VTZ
Nyva Vinnytsia	–	4–1	3–0
Veres Rivne	2–4	–	5–0
Volyn Zdolbuniv	– : +	2–3	–

Notes:

- Both Veres Rivne and Volyn-Tsement withdrew from the competition during the winter break.

=== Group C ===
Team	Pld	W	D	L	GF	GA	GD	Pts
Bastion Illichivsk	4	4	0	0	15	2	+13	12
Dnister-d Ovidiopol	4	2	0	2	8	8	+0	6
Teplovyk	4	0	0	4	0	13	−13	0

	BST	DST	TPL
Bastion Illichivsk	–	5–0	3–0
Dnister-d Ovidiopol	2–3	–	2–0
Teplovyk	0–4	0–4	–

Notes:

- On March 1, 2010, Dnister withdrew from the competition, while Teplovyk withdrew earlier during the winter break.

=== Group D ===
Team	Pld	W	D	L	GF	GA	GD	Pts
Myr Hornostaivka	4	2	1	1	5	4	+1	7
Spartak	4	1	2	1	3	4	−1	5
Olkom Melitopol	4	1	1	2	4	4	+0	4

	MYR	OLK	SPR
Myr Hornostaivka	–	2–0	2–1
Olkom Melitopol	2–0	–	0–1
Spartak	1–1	1–1	–

=== Group E ===
Team	Pld	W	D	L	GF	GA	GD	Pts
Khodak Cherkasy	4	2	1	1	9	2	+7	7
Olexandria-d	4	1	2	1	4	5	−1	5
Hirnyk-Sport	4	1	1	2	1	7	−6	4

	HSK	KDK	OLX
Hirnyk-Sport	–	+ : –	1–2
Khodak Cherkasy	3–1	–	5–0
Olexandria-d	1–1	0–0	–

Notes:

- On March 1, 2010, both Oleksandriya and Khodak Cherkasy withdrew from the competition. Hirnyk-Sport was offered and accepted a placed in the next round.

=== Group F ===
Team	Pld	W	D	L	GF	GA	GD	Pts
Ros Bila Tserkva	4	3	1	0	12	4	+8	10
Arsenal-d Bila Tserkva	4	2	1	1	9	6	+3	7
Zenit Boyarka	4	0	0	4	3	14	−11	0

	ARS	ROS	ZNT
Arsenal-d Bila Tserkva	–	1–2	4–2
Ros Bila Tserkva	2–2	–	+ : –
Zenit Boyarka	1–5	0–2	–

Notes:

- The game Ros – Zenit originally finished 0:1 (Zenit's victory), however due to the fact that Zenit fielded an unregistered player 'Zaza Tsotskhalashvili' the Bila Tserkva's club was awarded a technical victory (3:0) by the decision of the Disciplinary Committee of PFL on October 22, 2009.
- Game Ros – Arsenal-d 2:2 took place at the training ground of FC Arsenal Bila Tserkva in the town of Shkarivka.

=== Group G ===
Team	Pld	W	D	L	GF	GA	GD	Pts
Illichivets-2	4	1	3	0	4	3	+1	6
Shakhtar-3	4	1	2	1	7	6	+1	5
Tytan Donetsk	4	1	1	2	3	5	−2	4

	I2M	S3D	TYT
Illichivets-2	–	2–2	1–0
Shakhtar-3	1–1	–	4–1
Tytan Donetsk	0–0	2–0	–

=== Group H ===
Team	Pld	W	D	L	GF	GA	GD	Pts
Dniprodzerzhynsk	4	2	2	0	7	3	+4	8
Dnipro-75	4	1	2	1	5	3	+2	5
Olympik Kirovohrad	4	0	2	2	4	10	−6	2

	D75	SDD	OLY
Dnipro-75	–	– : +	4–2
Dniprodzerzhynsk	1–1	–	5–1
Olympik Kirovohrad	0–0	1–1	–

Notes:

- On 18 March 2010, Dnipro-75 were excluded from all competitions organized by the PFL for their unpaid debts. The place of Dnipro-75 was granted to and excepted by Olympik.

== Knockout stage ==
=== Bracket ===
Round of 16
Nyva Vinnytsia	3
Karpaty-2 Lviv	0
Bastion Illichivsk	0
Spartak Molodizhne	1
Hirnyk-Sport Komsomolsk	2
Arsenal-d Bila Tserkva	0
Illichivets-2 Mariupol	1
Olimpik Kirovohrad	0
Stal Dniprodzerzhynsk	2
Shakhtar-3 Donetsk	1

Quarter-finals
Nyva Vinnytsia	5
Lviv-2	0
Myr Hornostayivka (p)	0 (5)
Spartak Molodizhne	0 (4)
Hirnyk-Sport Komsomolsk	2
Ros Bila Tserkva	0
Stal Dniprodzerzhynsk	0 (2)
Illichivets-2 Mariupol (p)	0 (3)

Semi-finals
Nyva Vinnytsia	0	2	2
FC Myr Hornostayivka	0	0	0
Hirnyk-Sport Komsomolsk (a)	0	1	1
Illichivets-2 Mariupol	0	1	1

Final
6 June — Nika CSC, Oleksandriia
Nyva Vinnytsia	4
Hirnyk-Sport Komsomolsk	0

=== Round of 16 ===
31 March 2010	Bastion Illichivsk (2L)	0 – 1	(AM) Spartak Molodizhne	Illichivsk, Odesa Oblast
15:00		Report	Novotriasov 40'	Stadium: Olimpik; Attendance: 600; Referee: Roman Kalyta (Mykolaiv)

31 March 2010	Illichivets-2 Mariupol (2L)	1 – 0	(AM) Olimpik Kirovohrad	Mariupol, Donetsk Oblast
	Dotsenko 50'	Report		Stadium: Zakhidnyi; Attendance: 100; Referee: Denys Korabliov (Kerch)

31 March 2010	Hirnyk-Sport Komsomolsk (2L)	2 – 0	(1L) Arsenal-d Bila Tserkva	Komsomolsk, Poltava Oblast
	Skliarenko 50'; Kravchenko 58'	Report		Stadium: Yunist; Attendance: 300; Referee: Dmytro Popelnytskyi (Kirovohrad)

7 April 2010	Nyva Vinnytsia (2L)	3 – 0	(2L) Karpaty-2 Lviv	Vinnytsia
	Kozban 11', 70'; Kachur 15'	Report		Stadium: Tsentralnyi miskyi Attendance: 2,000; Referee: Ivan Bondar (Kyiv)

7 April 2010	Stal Dniprodzerzhynsk (2L)	2 – 1	(2L) Shakhtar-3 Donetsk	Dniprodzerzhynsk, Dnipropetrovsk Oblast
	Skarlosh 84'; Berezhnyi 90+3'	Report	Akulinin 56'	Stadium: Metalurh; Attendance: 1,200; Referee: Vadym Zhylin (Sumy)

=== Quarterfinals ===
14 April 2010
?:?

Myr Hornostaivka (AM)	0 – 0 aet pen. 5–4	(AM) Spartak Molodizhne
	Report

Zatys Stadium, Hornostaivka, Novotroitske Raion (Kherson)
Attendance: 700
Referee: D.Popelnytsky (Kirovohrad)

14 April 2010
?:?

Stal Dniprodzerzhynsk (2L)	0 – 0 aet pen. 2–3	(2L) Illichivets-2 Mariupol
	Report

Metalurh Stadium, Dniprodzerzhynsk
Attendance: 1,500
Referee: H.Litvinov (Luhansk)

14 April 2010
?:?

Hirnyk-Sport Komsomolsk (2L)	2 – 0	(2L) Ros Bila Tserkva
Zabula 17'; Poltavets 86'	Report

Yunist Stadium, Komsomolsk
Attendance: 70
Referee: Ya.Piesotsky (Sumy)

14 April 2010
?:?

Nyva Vinnytsia (2L)	5 – 0	(2L) Lviv-2
Kozban 23'; Varchenko 27'; Kachur 29'; Herheliuk 55'; Kuba 65'	Report

Municipal City Stadium, Vinnytsia
Attendance: 2,000
Referee: A.Papirovych (Khmelnytskyi)

Notes:

- In the game Hirnyk-Sport – Ros Dorohan (Ros) was not able to score a penalty in the 61st minute. In the same game Skliarenko (Hirnyk-Sport) was sent off in the 43rd minute for his second caution.

=== Semifinals ===
This stage was scheduled to take place in two-leg (home-away) match-ups. The first leg was played on April 28, 2010, and the second leg – May 5, 2010.

==== First leg ====
28 April 2010
17:30

Nyva Vinnytsia (2L)	0 – 0	(AM) Myr Hornostaivka
	Report

Municipal City Stadium, Vinnytsia
Attendance: 1,500
Referee: Ye.Petrakov (Kyiv)

28 April 2010
16:00

Hirnyk-Sport Komsomolsk (2L)	0 – 0	(2L) Illichivets-2 Mariupol
	Report

Yunist Stadium, Komsomolsk
Attendance: 100
Referee: O.Moskalenko (Kryvyi Rih)

==== Second leg ====
5 May 2010
15:00

Illichivets-2 Mariupol (2L)	1 – 1	(2L) Hirnyk-Sport Komsomolsk
Dotsenko 73' (pen.); Filatov (red card) 50'		Zabula 62'

Zakhidnyi Stadium, Mariupol
Attendance: 300
Referee: K.Monzul (Kharkiv Raion)

Illichivets-2 1–1 Hirnyk-Sport on aggregate. Hirnyk-Sport won on away goals.

5 May 2010
17:00

Myr Hornostaivka (AM)	0 – 2	(2L) Nyva Vinnytsia
Dotsenko (penalty missed) 15'	Report	Kozban 45+1'; Kachur 55'

Zatys Stadium, Hornostaivka, Novotroitske Raion (Kherson)
Attendance: 500
Referee: D.Kozorezov (Serhiivka village)

Myr Hornostaivka 0–2 Nyva Vinnytsia on aggregate.

Notes:

- In the game Myr – Nyva Dotsenko was not able to convert his penalty kick opportunity in the 15th minute, due to an excellent save on the part of Nyva's goalie Skybenko.

=== Final ===
Initially set for 29 May, the final took place on a neutral ground on 6 June 2010. Surprisingly the PFL picked Oleksandia's Nika Stadium which is 71 km (~46 mi) or about an hour drive from the city of Komsomolsk and 387 km (~255 mi) from Vinnytsia. As a justification, the main reason can be drawn from the fact that it lies in the heartland of Ukraine, and, thus, such a match could draw a greater audience.

6 June 2010
17:00

Nyva Vinnytsia (2L)	4 – 0	(2L) Hirnyk-Sport Komsomolsk
Voronin 19'; Kachur 48', 63'; Kozban 65'	Report

Nika Stadium, Oleksandriya
Referee: V.Diadenko (Kirovohrad)

Nyva Vinnytsia	Hirnyk-Sport Komsomolsk

Nyva Vinnytsia:
GK	12	(Ukraine) Vasyl Skybenko	(substituted off) 77'
DF	22	(Ukraine) Fedir Prokhorov
DF	4	(Ukraine) Oleksandr Herhelyuk
DF	10	(Ukraine) Volodymyr Naiko	(yellow card) 88'
DF	5	(Ukraine) Serhiy Voronin	(yellow card) 24' (goal) 19' (penalty missed) 90'+2
MF	13	(Ukraine) Serhiy Herasymets	(substituted off) 74'
FW	6	(Ukraine) Bohdan Varchenko	(substituted off) 59'
MF	9	(Ukraine) Andriy Pylyavskyi	(substituted off) 68'
MF	11	(Ukraine) Vadym Bovtruk	(substituted off) 72'
FW	18	(Ukraine) Ruslan Kachur	48', 63' (substituted off) 66'
FW	21	(Ukraine) Dmytro Kozban	65' (substituted off) 73'
Substitutes:
FW	8	(Ukraine) Andriy Veretynsky	(substituted on) 68'
FW	18	(Ukraine) Serhiy Kushka	(substituted on) 59' (yellow card) 78'
MF	7	(Ukraine) Pavlo Lukyanets	(substituted on) 66'
GK	1	(Ukraine) Oleksandr Haidarzhy	(substituted on) 77'
MF	15	(Ukraine) Oleksiy Pyvovar	(substituted on) 73'
MF	14	(Ukraine) Bohdan Adamenko	(substituted on) 74'
MF	2	(Ukraine) Chaus	(substituted on) 72'
Manager:
(Ukraine) Oleh Fedorchuk

Hirnyk-Sport Komsomolsk:
GK	1	(Ukraine) Denys Machulin	(substituted off) 90+1'
DF	17	(Ukraine) Volodymyr Tkachenko	(substituted off) 51'
FW	5	(Ukraine) Andriy Kondrashov	(yellow card) 44'
DF	22	(Ukraine) Illya Khodulya
MF	3	(Ukraine) Maksym Poltavets
FW	9	(Ukraine) Ruslan Dekhtyar	(substituted off) 62'
DF	2	(Ukraine) Yaroslav Kalinichenko	(substituted off) 54'
DF	8	(Ukraine) Kostyantyn Krutenko
MF	13	(Ukraine) Yevhen Slyva	(substituted off) 75'
MF	11	(Ukraine) Serhiy Kravchenko
DF	7	(Ukraine) Roman Malynochka	(substituted off) 86'
Substitutes:
GK	18	(Ukraine) Andriy Bakhmetiev	(substituted on) 90+1'
MF	23	(Ukraine) Yaroslav Bakhmach	(substituted on) 51'
FW	4	(Ukraine) Taras Malyuk	(substituted on) 62' (yellow card) 90'
MF	10	(Ukraine) Oleh Fil	(substituted on) 54'
DF	14	(Ukraine) Oleksandr Zabula	(substituted on) 75'
DF	20	(Ukraine) Vladyslav Ivashchenko	(substituted on) 86'
FW	12	(Ukraine) Dmytrenko	(substituted on) 89'
Manager:
(Ukraine) Serhiy Muradyan

MATCH OFFICIALS

- Assistant referees:
  - V.Fedan
  - A.Skrypka
- Fourth official: O.Katsman

MATCH RULES

- 90 minutes.
- 30 minutes of extra-time if necessary.
- Penalty shoot-out if scores still level.
- Seven named substitutes

Ukrainian League Cup 2010 Winners
Nyva Vinnytsia
First title

== Top goalscorers ==
In parentheses are goals scored from a penalty spot.

Scorer	Goals	Team
Kachur	5	Nyva Vinnytsia
Kozban	5	Nyva Vinnytsia
Polishchuk	5	Veres Rivne
Bredis	3	Bastion Illichivsk
Liubar	3	Veres Rivne
Petruk	3 (2)	Zenit Boyarka

Note:

- Petruk scored three goals in the tournament, with one of his scored in the game Ros – Zenit which was later recognized void. That goal is included in this record as the result's cancellation is a mere administrative formality.
- Polusmak (Zenit) managed to score two goals in four games (one was recognized void).
- Please, note that Bredis (Bastion Illichivsk) is a veteran of Odesa football. He used to compete for the predecessor of Bastion, FC Portovyk Illichivsk in the Second League as well as various national cup competitions.

== See also ==
- Ukrainian Second League 2009–10
- Ukrainian First League 2009–10
- 2009–10 Ukrainian Cup
- Ukrainian Second League Cup
