= 2010 Ukrainian Football Amateur League =

Ukrainian Football Amateur League
- Season: 2010
- Champions: Myr Hornostaivka (1st title) Zvyahel-750 Novohrad-Volynskyi (losing finalist)
- Promoted: 1 – Enerhiya

The 2010 Ukrainian Football Amateur League season.

== Teams ==
=== Returning/reformed clubs ===
- Enerhiya Nova Kakhovka (returning, last played season in 1994–95)
- Elektrometalurh-NZF Nikopol (returning, last played season in 2006)
- Khimmash Korosten (returning, last played season in 2006)

=== Debut ===
List of teams that are debuting this season in the league.

- FC Ternopil
- Topilche Ternopil
- UkrAhroKom Holovkivka
- Zviahel-750 Novohrad-Volynskyi

=== Withdrawn ===
List of clubs that took part in last year competition, but chose not to participate in 2010 season:

- Bastion-2 Illichivsk
- Kniahynyn Pidhaichyky
- Zbruch Volochysk
- Horyzont Koziatyn
- KNTEU
- Zenit Boyarka
- Irpin Horenychi
- FC Luzhany
- Khodak Cherkasy
- Slovkhlib Slovyansk

=== Location map ===
Location of participating teams in the 2010 Ukrainian amateur championship

== First stage ==
=== Group 1 ===
Pos	Team	Pld	W	D	L	GF	GA	GD	Pts	Qualification
1	Ternopil (Q)	8	7	1	0	19	4	+15	22	Finals
2	Zvyahel-750 Novohrad-Volynsky (Q)	8	5	1	2	26	10	+16	16	Finals
3	ODEK Orzhiv (Q)	8	4	2	2	14	11	+3	14	Finals
4	Verest Dunaivtsi	8	1	0	7	4	18	−14	3	
5	Topilche Ternopil	8	1	0	7	5	25	−20	3	

(Q) Qualified for the phase indicated

=== Group 2 ===
Pos	Team	Pld	W	D	L	GF	GA	GD	Pts	Qualification
1	Lokomotyv Kupiansk (Q)	6	5	0	1	11	4	+7	15	Finals
2	Yednist-2 Plysky (Q)	6	3	0	3	12	7	+5	9	Finals
3	UkrAhroKom Holovkivka	6	2	1	3	7	14	−7	7	
4	Khimmash Korosten	6	1	1	4	8	13	−5	4	

(Q) Qualified for the phase indicated

=== Group 3 ===
Pos	Team	Pld	W	D	L	GF	GA	GD	Pts	Qualification
1	Myr Hornostayivka (Q)	8	6	0	2	16	8	+8	18	Finals
2	Torpedo Mykolaiv (Q)	8	5	1	2	19	15	+4	16	Finals
3	Enerhiya Nova Kakhovka (Q)	8	3	2	3	10	9	+1	11	Second League
4	Elektrometalurh-NZF Nikopol	8	2	1	5	16	15	+1	7	
5	Olimpik Kirovohrad	8	2	0	6	7	21	−14	6	

(Q) Qualified for the phase indicated

== Finals ==
=== Group A ===
Pos	Team	Pld	W	D	L	GF	GA	GD	Pts	Qualification	MHO	ODK	LKU
1	Myr Hornostayivka (H, Q)	2	1	1	0	6	3	+3	4	Final game	—	2–2	4–1
2	ODEK Orzhiv	2	1	1	0	5	2	+3	4			—	3–0
3	Lokomotyv Kupiansk	2	0	0	2	1	7	−6	0				—

(H) Hosts; (Q) Qualified for the phase indicated

=== Group B ===
Pos	Team	Pld	W	D	L	GF	GA	GD	Pts	Qualification	ZNV	Y2P	TMY	TER
1	Zvyahel-750 Novohrad-Volynsky (Q)	3	3	0	0	9	4	+5	9	Final game	—	3–2	3–2	3–0
2	Yednist-2 Plysky	3	2	0	1	10	4	+6	6			—	2–0	6–1
3	Torpedo Mykolaiv	3	1	0	2	5	5	0	3				—	3–0
3	Ternopil	3	0	0	3	1	12	−11	0					—

(Q) Qualified for the phase indicated

== Championship match ==
19 September 2010
15:00

Myr Hornostaivka	2 – 0	Zvyahel-750 Novohrad-Volynskyi
Zhyhalov 24'; Dotsenko 57'	Report

Zatys Stadium, Hornostaivka
Attendance: 1,100
Referee: Rudenko

== Number of teams by region ==
Number	Region	Team(s)
2	Kherson Oblast	Enerhia Nova Kakhovka, Myr Hornostaivka
2	Kirovohrad Oblast	Olimpik Kirovohrad, UkrAhroKom Pryiutivka
2	Ternopil Oblast	FC Ternopil, Topilche Ternopil
2	Zhytomyr Oblast	Khimmash Korosten, Zviahel-750 Novohrad-Volynskyi
1	Chernihiv Oblast	Yednist-2 Plysky
1	Dnipropetrovsk Oblast	Elektrometalurh-NZF Nikopol
1	Kharkiv Oblast	Lokomotyv Kupiansk
1	Khmelnytskyi Oblast	Verest Dunaivtsi
1	Mykolaiv Oblast	Torpedo Mykolaiv
1	Rivne Oblast	ODEK Orzhiv
