= Cup of Ukrainian PFL 2009 (winter) =

Ukrainian soccer competition

The Cup of Ukrainian PFL 2009 was the first season of Professional Football League of Ukraine knockout competition, currently known as Cup of PFL or Kubok of PFL.

The Cup began with a semi-final round where teams, representing each division of the PFL, participated. The winners of that round advanced to the finals and the losing teams to the match for the third place.

The competition took place at the sport arena of the FC Kniazha Schaslyve.

== Participating teams ==
Ukrainian First League

Taras Mikush (Enerhetyk), Kyktiev (Zakarpattia), Mykola Revutskyi, Ihor Khudobyak (both - Prykarpattia), Maksym Syrota, Andriy Herasymenko, Oleksandr Nikitin, Anton Lysiuk (all - Olexandria), Vladyslav Chanhelia, Serhiy Yavorskyi (both - Obolon), Chabak (Desna), Yuri Fedorchuk (Volyn). Coach - Yuri Koval.

Ukrainian Second League Group A
Bahlay (Arsenal BT), Kinakh, Herheliuk, Serhiychuk (all - Veres), Paskiv, Drahan, Basarab (all - Nyva V), Virkovskyi, Sokil, Putrash (all - Nyva T), Nalikashvili, Dorohan (both - Ros), Bielov (CSKA), Naiko, Adamenko, Bovtrun, Kazakov, Kolodiazhnyi, Duda, Syrynnyk (all - Nafkom). Coach - Oleh Fedorchuk.

Ukrainian Second League Group B
Savchenko, Taranukha (both - OLKOM), Maksym Leschenko, Roman Yemelyanov (both - Arsenal Kh), Klymentovskyi, Kozlov (both - Tytan A), Vasyl Klimov, Dmytro Voloshyn (both - Kremin), Novytskyi, Potyvtsev, Korayuk, Berezovskyi (all - Zirka), Sharko (Hirnyk-Sport), Shevchenko, Khomchenovskyi, Sikulskyi (all - Olimpik). Coach - Ihor Zhabchenko.

Ukrainian Student Football League Coach - Volodymyr Lozynskyi.

== Competition ==
=== Semi-finals ===
Students; Pozdeyev 35	1–1 aet (1-1) (pen. 3–1)	Druha A Dorohan 22
Druha B Sikulskyi 78; Klimov 89; Putivtsev 30 (red card)	2–1 (0-1)	Persha; Mykush 7

=== Final round ===
==== Third-place game ====
Druha A Dorohan 14; Serhiychuk 21, 45; Nikolayev 63	4–2 (3-0)	Persha; Revutskyi 66; Kolesnyk 83

==== Final ====
Druha B Leschenko 30; Sikulskyi 83	2–1 (1-1)	Students; Boryshkevych 18

== Top goalscorers ==
Status on March 3, 2009

Scorer	Goals	Team
(Ukraine) Dorohan	2	Ros Bila Tserkva
(Ukraine) Sikulskyi	2	Olimpik Donetsk
(Ukraine) Serhiychuk	2	Veres Rivne

Statistics can be found at PFL web-site.
