= 2008 Ukrainian Football Amateur League =

Ukrainian Football Amateur League
- Season: 2008
- Champions: FC Luzhany (1st title) Torpedo Mykolaiv (losing finalist)
- Promoted: 3 – Bastion, Dnipro-75, Desna-2

Following are the results of the Ukrainian Football Amateur League 2008 season. Participation is restricted to the regional (Oblast) champions and/or the most regarded team by the respective regional association.

This season competition consisted of two stages. The first stage was organized in regional principal and was played in two rounds where each team could play another at its home ground. On the first stage each group winners and the best runner-up advanced to the next part of the competition automatically, the other four runners-up were paired together to identify two more teams that were to advance. Sokil Zolochiv that won the play-off and was accepted for the finals at the end was not able to arrive to play. The second stage and the concluding was played in Chernivtsi where the teams were split in two groups and the first places were advancing to the final.

== Teams ==
=== Debut ===
List of teams that are debuting this season in the league.

- Ametyst Oleksandriya
- Dnipro-75 Dnipropetrovsk
- Kholodnyi Yar Kamianka
- Sokil Zolochiv
- BRB-VIK Volodymyr-Volynskyi
- Horyzont Koziatyn
- Myr Hornostayivka
- Torpedo Mykolaiv
- Chornomornaftohaz Simferepol
- Illich Osypenko
- Polissia-2 Zhytomyr
- Zenit Boyarka
- Desna-2 Chernihiv
- Karpaty Yaremche
- PTP Dunaivtsi
- Zirka Kyiv

=== Withdrawn ===
List of clubs that took part in last year competition, but chose not to participate in 2008 season:

- Antares Obukhiv
- Donbas-Krym Donetsk
- Syhma Kherson
- Avanhard Sutysky
- Halychyna Lviv
- Tsementnyk Yamnytsia
- Bryz Izmail
- Ivan Odesa
- FC Velyka Bahachka
- Budfarfor Slavuta
- OLKAR Sharhorod
- Zirka Kirovohrad

=== Location map ===
Location of participating teams in the 2009 Ukrainian amateur championship

== First stage ==
Note: Some records are not full.

=== Group A ===
Pos	Team	Pld	W	D	L	GF	GA	GD	Pts	Qualification
1	Luzhany	8	6	0	2	13	4	+9	18	Second Stage
2	Sokil Zolochiv	8	5	0	3	14	13	+1	15	Second Stage
3	Karpaty Yaremche	8	4	0	4	12	11	+1	12	
4	Volyn-Tsement Zdolbuniv	8	3	1	4	8	18	−10	10	
5	Sokil Berezhany	8	1	1	6	7	8	−1	4	

Note: Last two games of Sokil Berezhany were forfeited.

=== Group B ===
Pos	Team	Pld	W	D	L	GF	GA	GD	Pts	Qualification
1	ODEK Orzhiv	8	4	4	0	11	6	+5	16	Second Stage
2	Polissya-2 Zhytomyr	8	5	0	3	11	9	+2	15	
3	Horyzont Koziatyn	8	2	5	1	12	9	+3	11	
4	PTP-INAPiK Dunaivtsi	8	2	3	3	15	16	−1	9	
5	BRB-VIK Volodymyr-Volynskyi	8	0	2	6	6	15	−9	2	

Note: Polissya-2 Zhytomyr is the youth sport-school of the disbanded professional team Polissya Zhytomyr.

=== Group C ===
Pos	Team	Pld	W	D	L	GF	GA	GD	Pts	Qualification
1	Metalurh Malyn	8	5	2	1	22	10	+12	17	Second Stage
2	Yednist-2 Plysky	8	5	2	1	17	11	+6	17	Second Stage
3	Kholodnyi Yar	8	4	2	2	14	11	+3	14	
4	Zirka Kyiv	8	2	1	5	15	16	−1	7	
5	Zenit Boyarka	8	0	1	7	8	28	−20	1	

=== Group D ===
Pos	Team	Pld	W	D	L	GF	GA	GD	Pts	Qualification
1	Lokomotyv Kupiansk	8	6	1	1	15	8	+7	19	Second Stage
2	Dnipro-75 Dnipropetrovsk	8	5	1	2	18	8	+10	16	joined Druha Liha
3	Olexandria-Ametyst Olexandria	8	2	2	4	6	17	−11	8	
4	Khodak Cherkasy	8	2	1	5	10	13	−3	7	
5	Desna-2 Chernihiv	8	2	1	5	7	10	−3	7	joined Druha Liha

=== Group E ===
Pos	Team	Pld	W	D	L	GF	GA	GD	Pts	Qualification
1	Torpedo Mykolaiv	8	5	3	0	10	5	+5	18	Second Stage
2	Myr Hornostaivka	8	4	2	2	12	11	+1	14	Second Stage
3	Bastion Illichivsk	8	4	1	3	23	13	+10	13	joined Druha Liha
4	Chornomornaftohaz Simferopol	8	3	0	5	8	4	+4	9	
5	Illich Osypenko	8	1	0	7	6	26	−20	3	

== Final stage ==
- Sokil Zolochiv decided not to participate any further.

=== Group 1 ===
Pos	Team	Pld	W	D	L	GF	GA	GD	Pts	Qualification	LUZ	LKU	MMA
1	Luzhany (H)	2	2	0	0	5	1	+4	6	Final game	—	3–1	2–0
2	Lokomotyv Kupiansk	2	1	0	1	3	4	−1	3			—	2–1
3	Metalurh Malyn	2	0	0	2	1	4	−3	0				—

(H) Hosts

=== Group 2 ===
Pos	Team	Pld	W	D	L	GF	GA	GD	Pts	Qualification	TMY	Y2P	MHO	ODK
1	Torpedo Mykolaiv	3	2	0	1	9	5	+4	6	Final game	—	0–1	5–2	4–2
2	Yednist-2 Plysky	3	1	2	0	2	1	+1	5			—	1–1	0–0
3	Myr Hornostaivka	3	1	1	1	6	7	−1	4				—	3–1
4	ODEK Orzhiv	3	0	1	2	3	7	−4	1					—

== Championship title match ==
18 September 2008
14:00

FC Luzhany	2 – 1	Torpedo Mykolaiv
Yanchyk 4' (pen.), 56'	Report; Report (uaf)	Huk 70'

City Stadium, Kitsman
Attendance: 2,500
Referee: Lavriv

== Number of teams by region ==
Number	Region	Team(s)
2	Cherkasy Oblast	Khodak Cherkasy, Kholodnyi Yar Kamianka
2	Chernihiv Oblast	Desna-2 Chernihiv, Yednist-2 Plysky
2	Rivne Oblast	ODEK Orzhiv, Volyn-Tsement Zdolbuniv
2	Zhytomyr Oblast	Metalurh Malyn, SDYuShOR Polissia Zhytomyr
1	Autonomous Republic of Crimea	Chornomornaftohaz Simferopol
1	Chernivtsi Oblast	FC Luzhany
1	Dnipropetrovsk Oblast	Dnipro-75 Dnipropetrovsk
1	Ivano-Frankivsk Oblast	Karpaty Yaremche
1	Kharkiv Oblast	Lokomotyv Kupiansk
1	Kherson Oblast	Myr Hornostaivka
1	Khmelnytskyi Oblast	PTP-INAPiK Dunaivtsi
1	Kirovohrad Oblast	Oleksandria-Ametyst
1	Kyiv	Zirka
1	Kyiv Oblast	Zenit Boyarka
1	Lviv Oblast	Sokil Zolochiv
1	Mykolaiv Oblast	Torpedo Mykolaiv
1	Odesa Oblast	Bastion Illichivsk
1	Ternopil Oblast	Sokil Berezhany
1	Vinnytsia Oblast	Horyzont Koziatyn
1	Volyn Oblast	BRB-WIK Volodymyr-Volynskyi
