= Serhiy Nazarenko =

Ukrainian footballer

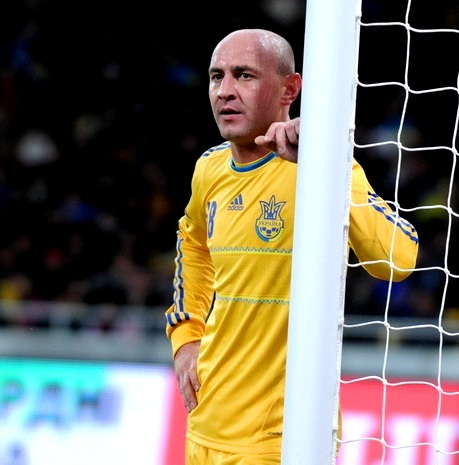
- Nazarenko playing for Ukraine against Germany in 2011

Personal information
- Full name: Serhiy Yuriyovych Nazarenko
- Date of birth: 16 February 1980 (age 46)
- Place of birth: Kirovohrad, Ukrainian SSR, USSR
- Height: 1.76 m (5 ft 9 in)
- Positions: Attacking midfielder; winger

Youth career
- Zirka Kirovohrad
- Dnipropetrovsk sports school

Senior career*
Years	Team	Apps	(Gls)
1998–2011	Dnipro Dnipropetrovsk	266	(54)
1998–2002	→ Dnipro-2 Dnipropetrovsk	101	(12)
2000–2002	→ Dnipro-3 Dnipropetrovsk	17	(3)
2011–2014	Tavriya Simferopol	77	(17)
2014	Chornomorets Odesa	10	(1)
2015	Metalist Kharkiv	14	(1)
2016	Dnipro Dnipropetrovsk	6	(0)
2018–2019	Dnipro	14	(5)
Total		505	(93)

International career
2003–2012	Ukraine	56	(12)

Managerial career
- 2017: Dnipro (U21 assistant)
- 2017–2019: Dnipro (assistant)
- * Club domestic league appearances and goals

Serhiy Yuriyovych Nazarenko (Ukrainian: Сергій Юрійович Назаренко; born 16 February 1980) is a Ukrainian former footballer who played as an attacking midfielder or winger.

He is known for having played as a midfielder for now-defunct Ukrainian football club Dnipro, its farm clubs Dnipro-2 and Dnipro-3, as well as Crimea-based Tavriya.

Nazarenko played with the Ukraine national football team between 2003 and 2012 and was called up for the 2006 World Cup and UEFA Euro 2012.

== Club career ==
Nazarenko began his career in his hometown of Kirovohrad at Zirka Kirovohrad. He made his move to Dnipro in 1997 and although he debuted for the main team on 3 October 1999, he did not make his first-team appearance until the 2002–03 season.

In the 2006–07 season, he was voted the best player in the Ukrainian Premier League, according to a poll conducted by the "Sport-Express" newspaper.

On 29 July, he claimed the club record for most goals scored in a season with 32 goals after scoring twice against FC Metalurh Donetsk, overtaking Oleh Venglinsky with 31.

He signed a 3-year contract with Tavriya Simferopol after his contract with Dnipro expired. In the summer of 2014, Serhiy signed for club Chornomorets Odesa. On 28 January 2015, it was reported that Serhiy Nazarenko has had his contract mutually terminated by Chornomorets Odesa.

== International career ==
Serhiy Nazarenko debuted for the Ukraine national football team on 11 October 2003 in a match against Macedonia which ended in a 0–0 draw. On 11 February 2009 Serhiy Nazarenko scored a goal against Serbia in a friendly match. On 10 June 2009 his double was essential to gain an important win over the team from Kazakhstan after trailing behind after the first 30 minutes into the game. At that, his total goals scored was 10 which put him right behind Serhiy Rebrov and Andriy Shevchenko in the list of top scorers on the Ukraine national football team.

=== International goals ===
Serhiy Nazarenko: International goals (as of 10 October 2009)
No.	Date	Venue	Opponent	Score	Result	Competition
1.	17 August 2005	Dynamo Stadium, Kyiv	Serbia and Montenegro	2–0	2–1	Friendly
2.	28 May 2006	NSC Olimpiyskiy, Kyiv	Costa Rica	1–0	4–0	Friendly
3.	15 August 2006	Dynamo Stadium, Kyiv	Azerbaijan	2–0	6–0	Friendly
4.	26 March 2008	Dynamo Stadium, Kyiv	Serbia	2–0	2–0	Friendly
5.	1 June 2008	Råsunda Stadium, Stockholm	Sweden	0–1	0–1	Friendly
6.	10 September 2008	Ortaliq Stadium, Almaty	Kazakhstan	0–1	1–3	2010 World Cup qualification
7.	10 September 2008	Ortaliq Stadium, Almaty	Kazakhstan	1–3	1–3	2010 World Cup qualification
8.	11 February 2009	GSP Stadium, Nicosia	Serbia	0–1	0–1	Friendly
9.	10 June 2009	Dynamo Stadium, Kyiv	Kazakhstan	1–1	2–1	2010 World Cup qualification
10.	10 June 2009	Dynamo Stadium, Kyiv	Kazakhstan	2–1	2–1	2010 World Cup qualification
11.	10 October 2009	Dnipro-Arena, Dnipropetrovsk	England	1–0	1–0	2010 World Cup qualification
12.	11 November 2011	NSC Olimpiyskiy, Kyiv	Germany	3–1	3–3	Friendly

== Honours ==
=== Team ===
==== "Dnipro" ====
- Bronze medalist of the Premier League of the Championship of Ukraine (1): 2003–2004
- Finalist of the Cup of Ukraine (1): 2003–2004
- Semifinalist of the Cup of Ukraine (5): 2000–2001, 2001–2002, 2002–2003, 2004–2005, 2010–2011

==== "Dnipro-2" ====
Gold medalist of the second league of the Championship of Ukraine (1): 1999–2000

=== Individual ===
- The best player of the championship of Ukraine (according to the newspaper "Team"): 2006, 2007
- For high sports results at the 2006 World Cup in Germany, he was awarded the Order for Courage III degree
- On 4 April 2015, in the 86th minute of the match against Metalurh Donetsk, he scored the 100th goal of his career and then joined Huseynov's club

=== Achievements ===
On 10 June 2009, scoring two goals for Kazakhstan, Nazarenko scored 10 goals for the national team and became the third top scorer in the history of the national team, after Shevchenko and Rebrov.

He was the best scorer of "Dnipro" in European Cups (8 goals).

== See also ==
- 2001 FIFA World Youth Championship squads#Ukraine
