= Viktor Bohatyr =

Ukrainian football player (born 1969)

Personal information
- Full name: Viktor Mykolayovych Bohatyr
- Date of birth: 11 May 1969 (age 57)
- Place of birth: Oleksandriia, Ukrainian SSR
- Height: 1.84 m (6 ft 1/2 in)
- Position: Midfielder

Youth career
- Oleksandria sports school

Senior career*
Years	Team	Apps	(Gls)
1987	Dnepr Mogilev	3	(0)
1988–1989	SKIF Minsk		
1989	Dinamo Minsk	0	(0)
1990–1991	Dnepr Mogilev	42	(1)
1991–1993	Polihraftekhnika Oleksandriia	59	(14)
1993–1994	Chornomorets Odesa	32	(3)
1994–1995	Polihraftekhnika Oleksandriia	39	(10)
1995	→ Kryvbas Kryvyi Rih (loan)	12	(1)
1996–1998	Vorskla Poltava	46	(5)
1997–1998	→ Vorskla-2 Poltava	16	(3)
1998	→ Kremin Kremenchuk (loan)	15	(3)
1999	Zirka Kirovohrad	1	(0)
1999	→ Zirka-2 Kirovohrad	2	(0)
2000–2001	Syhnal Odesa		(3)
2001	Torpedo-Kadino Mogilev	9	(1)
2002	Nyva Ternopil	15	(0)
2003	Palmira Odesa	10	(0)

Managerial career
- 2003: Palmira Odesa (assistant)
- 2003–2005: Palmira Odesa
- 2005: Hirnyk Kryvyi Rih
- 2006–2008: Oleksandriya
- 2010: Nistru Otaci (caretaker)
- 2011: Gagauziya-Oguzsport (assistant)
- 2011: Sfântul Gheorghe Suruceni (assistant)
- 2015: Inhulets Petrove
- 2015–2016: Veres Rivne
- 2016–2017: Myr Hornostayivka
- 2017–2018: Volyn Lutsk
- * Club domestic league appearances and goals

Viktor Bohatyr (born 11 May 1969) is a former football player and current manager.

== Career ==
He played for FC Dnepr Mogilev and FC Chornomorets Odesa, and he coached FC Oleksandriya, FC Hirnyk Kryvyi Rih and FC Inhulets Petrove.
