= Vadym Bovtruk =

Ukrainian football midfielder

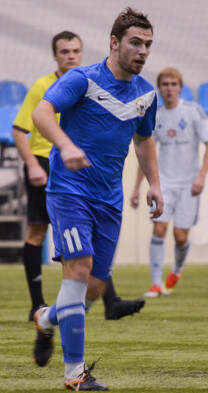

Personal information
- Full name: Бовтрук Вадим Игоревич
- Date of birth: 18 August 1991 (age 35)
- Place of birth: Kyiv, Ukrainian SSR
- Height: 1.72 m (5 ft 8 in)
- Position: Midfielder

Team information
- Current team: Dinaz Vyshhorod
- Number: 15

Senior career*
Years	Team	Apps	(Gls)
2008–2009	Nafkom Brovary	30	(5)
2009-2012	Nyva Vinnytsia	72	(11)
2011-2017	Desna Chernihiv	142	(9)
2017-2018	Obolon Kyiv	20	(1)
2017-2018	Polissya Zhytomyr	10	(0)
2018-2019	Sumy	14	(1)
2019-2022	Dinaz Vyshhorod	57	(7)
2022-	Shturm Ivankiv	0	(0)
- * Club domestic league appearances and goals as of 27 November 2021

Vadym Bovtruk (Russian: Бовтрук Вадим Игоревич; born Kyiv 18 August 1991) is a Ukrainian professional football midfielder who plays for Dinaz Vyshhorod.

== Career ==
Vadym started his career in Nafkom Brovary, from 2008 until 2009. Then he moved to Nyva Vinnytsia, where in the season 2009–10 he for promoted to Ukrainian First League. Here played until 2011, here he played 72 games and he scored 11 goals. In 2011 he moved to Desna Chernihiv, the main team in Chernihiv where he played 142 games and scored 9 goals until 2017, where he got promoted with the club to the Ukrainian First League after the season 2012–13 in Ukrainian Second League.

From 2017 he moved to Obolon Kyiv, and in Polissya Zhytomyr. In 2018 until 2019 he moved Sumy in Ukrainian First League and in 2019 he moved to Dinaz Vyshhorod just promoted to Ukrainian Second League. On 1 May 2021 he scored against Karpaty Halych away at the Enerhetyk Stadium.

== Honours ==
Dinaz Vyshhorod

- Ukrainian Second League: Runner-Up 2020–21

Desna Chernihiv

- Ukrainian Second League: 2012–13
- Ukrainian First League: Runner-up 2016–17

Nyva Vinnytsia

- Ukrainian Second League: 2009–10
- Ukrainian League Cup: 2009–10
