= Cup of Ukrainian PFL 2009 (summer) =

The Cup of Ukrainian PFL 2009 (summer) was the second season of the Professional Football League of Ukraine knockout competition, currently known as Cup of PFL or Kubok of PFL.

The Cup began on June 19 with a semi-final round where teams, representing each division of the professional Ukrainian football league system participated. The winners of that round advanced to the finals and the losing teams to the match for the third place.

The competition took place at Yuvileiny Stadium in Sumy.

== Participating teams ==
- a team of the Ukrainian First League, Coach - Mykhailo Dunets.
- a team of the Ukrainian Second League Group A, Coach - Ihor Khimych.
- a team of the Ukrainian Second League Group B, Coach - Ihor Zhabchenko.
- Ukraine national under-17 football team, Coach - Oleksandr Holovko.

== Competition ==
=== Semi-finals ===
Persha; Ponomar 17	1–1 aet (1-1) (pen. 4–2)	Druha A Nikolayev 9
Druha B Kravchenko ? ? ? (red card)	1–1 aet (1-0) (pen. 7–6)	Ukraine U-17 ? ? ? ? (red card)

=== Final round ===
==== Third Place Game ====
Druha A Hudyma ? (pen.), 89; Nikolayev 43	3–2 (2-1)	Ukraine U-17; Ivanko ? Budkovsky 75

==== Final ====
Persha; Kablash 33, 40; Daudov ? (pen.); Nikitin ?	4–3 (2-1)	Druha B Kravchenko 34; Putyvtsev ? Symonian ?

== Top goalscorers ==
Status on June 21, 2009

At least four players of the tournament scored two goals.
