= Vladyslav Molko =

Ukrainian footballer

Personal information
- Full name: Vladyslav Ruslanovych Molko
- Date of birth: 19 October 2002 (age 24)
- Place of birth: Kremenchuk, Ukraine
- Height: 1.75 m (5 ft 9 in)
- Position: Defensive midfielder

Team information
- Current team: Kremin
- Number: 27

Youth career
- 2014–2019: Kremin Kremenchuk
- 2014–2015: → Kremin-2 Kremenchuk

Senior career*
Years	Team	Apps	(Gls)
2019–2020	Kremin-Yunior Kremenchuk	10	(1)
2020–	Kremin Kremenchuk	40	(2)
2022–	→ Kremin-2 Kremenchuk	9	(1)
2023	→ Hirnyk-Sport Horishni Plavni (loan)	18	(1)
- * Club domestic league appearances and goals as of 23 October 2024

Vladyslav Ruslanovych Molko (Ukrainian: Владислав Русланович Молько; born 19 October 2002) is a Ukrainian professional footballer who plays as a defensive midfielder for Ukrainian club Kremin Kremenchuk.

== Early life ==
His father began taking him to Kremin matches at an early age. When Vladyslav joined Kremin Academy his first coach was Anton Dyndikov.

== Career ==
=== Kremin-Yunior ===
During the 2019–20 season, in early August, Kremin's leadership decided to field its development team for the Ukrainian Amateur Football Championship. Vladyslav was part of the young team. He featured in all ten matches and scored one goal.

=== Kremin ===
When Kremin-Yunior folded, Vladyslav was called up to Kremin squad at the end of February 2020.29 February 2020. Molko made his debut for Kremin Kremenchuk during a cup match with Peremoha on 29 August 2020 aged 17. He was the youngest player in the team. Kremin manager Oleksandr Holovko described him as a utility player, stating he can play any position, other than goalkeeper. On August 9 he played for Kremin in the first game since the start of Russian invasion of Ukraine, next day he captained Kremin-2 Kremenchuk and scored his debut goal for the club.

=== Hirnyk-Sport ===
Molko moved to on loan to Hirnyk-Sport Horishni Plavni on 21 June 2023.
