= FC Zvyahel-750 Novohrad-Volynskyi =

- Full name: FC Zvyahel-750 Novohrad-Volynskyi
- Founded: 2007
- League: Zhytormyr Oblast

FC Zvyahel-750 Novohrad-Volynskyi is a Ukrainian football club from Zviahel, Zhytomyr Oblast. Zvyahel is the original name for Novohrad-Volynskyi.

== History ==
The club was founded in 2007 on the 750th anniversary of the city of Zvyahel (Novohrad-Volynskyi). It participates in the regional competition.

In 2010 the club made it to the final of the Ukrainian Amateur Football Championship.

In 2011, the city authorities of Novohrad-Volynskyi decided to revive former Soviet club Avanhard.

== Honors ==
- Ukrainian Amateur Football Championship
  - Runners-up (1): 2010
- Zhytomyr Oblast championship
  - Winners (1): 2010
  - Runners-up (1): 2009

== League and cup history ==
Season	Div.	Pos.	Pl.	W	D	L	GS	GA	P	Domestic Cup	Europe	Notes
