= Ruslan Kachur =

Ukrainian footballer

Personal information
- Full name: Ruslan Anatoliyovych Kachur
- Date of birth: 9 June 1982 (age 44)
- Place of birth: Vatutine, Cherkasy Oblast, Ukrainian SSR
- Height: 1.78 m (5 ft 10 in)
- Position: Forward

Team information
- Current team: FC Cherkaskyi Dnipro
- Number: 88

Youth career
- Vatutine sports school
- 1998–1999: FC Khodak Cherkasy

Senior career*
Years	Team	Apps	(Gls)
2003–2007	FC Dnipro Cherkasy	96	(18)
2008	Simurq PIK	8	(1)
2008–2009	FC Dnister Ovidiopol	45	(6)
2010–2011	FC Nyva Vinnytsia	38	(9)
2011–2014	FC Helios Kharkiv	71	(19)
2014	Navbahor Namangan	12	(5)
2015–2018	FC Cherkaskyi Dnipro	48	(10)
2018–2020	FC LNZ-Lebedyn		
- * Club domestic league appearances and goals

Ruslan Anatoliyovych Kachur (Ukrainian: Руслан Анатолійович Качур; born 9 June 1982 in Vatutine, Cherkasy Oblast, Ukrainian SSR) is a former Ukrainian footballer.

He is a product of the Vatutine and Cherkasy sports schools system, and later played for clubs from Central Ukraine.

== Honours ==
- Ukrainian League Cup
  - Winner (1): 2009–10
