= Serhiy Makarov =

President of PFL Ukraine

Serhiy Makarov (Ukrainian: Сергій Макаров; born 8 June 1977 in Zhdanov, Donetsk Oblast) is a Ukrainian sports functionary and was a president of the Professional Football League of Ukraine (PFL).

== Biography ==
Makarov graduated from the Donetsk State Technical University in management of foreign economic activity and later information computer systems and technologies.

Since at least 2009, Makarov has worked for PFL, first as the director of the information and analytical center and later, since 2010, as executive director. During that period, Makarov received a certification in sports management under the programs НУФВСУ and CIES, which FFU provided along with FIFA.

On 27 June 2014, Makarov won the presidential election of PFL becoming its fifth president. On 5 August 2020, Makarov resigned from his position.

== Criticism ==
On July 20, 2020, the previous PFL chairman Miletiy Balchos was critical of Makarov's performance as the PFL president. Balchos called him a former Security Service of Ukraine (SBU) agent.

Sporting positions
Preceded by Miletiy Balchos	Presidents of PFL; 2014–2020	Succeeded by Oleksandr Kadenko (acting)
