= Serhiy Zhyhalov =

Ukrainian footballer (born 1983)

Personal information
- Full name: Serhiy Oleksandrovych Zhyhalov
- Date of birth: 6 January 1983 (age 43)
- Place of birth: Ukrainian SSR
- Position: Forward

Team information
- Current team: FC Tavria-Skif Rozdol

Youth career
- 1998–2000: FC Torpedo Zaporizhzhia

Senior career*
Years	Team	Apps	(Gls)
1998–2000	FC Viktor Zaporizhzhia	7	(0)
2000–2003	FC Metalurh Zaporizhzhia	0	(0)
2000–2003	→ FC Metalurh-2 Zaporizhzhia (loan)	42	(2)
2005	FC ZAlK Zaporizhzhia	0	(0)
2008	FC Illich Osypenko	7	(2)
2009–2010	FC Myr Hornostayivka	27	(32)
2009	→ FC Elektrometalurh Nikopol (loan)	1	(0)
2010	→ FC Nikopol-Dnipryany (loan)	1	(0)
2011	FK Sūduva Marijampolė	17	(4)
2011	FK Mažeikiai	16	(8)
2012	FK Kruoja Pakruojis	29	(15)
2013	FC Tytan Armyansk	28	(5)
2014	FC Yalta	?	(?)
2015	FC Vektor Bohatyrivka	3	(7)
2015	FC Kolos Zachepylivka	7	(4)
2016–	FC Tavria-Skif Rozdol	15	(6)
- * Club domestic league appearances and goals

Serhiy Zhyhalov (Ukrainian: Сергій Олександрович Жигалов; born 6 January 1983) is a Ukrainian footballer.

== Career ==
He played for FC Tytan Armyansk and FC Metalurh-2 Zaporizhzhia in the Ukrainian Second League as well as several Lithuanian clubs in the A Lyga.
