= Ivan Palamarchuk =

Ukrainian footballer (born 2000)

Personal information
- Full name: Ivan Heorhiyovych Palamarchuk
- Date of birth: 20 March 2000 (age 26)
- Place of birth: Irpin, Ukraine
- Height: 1.80 m (5 ft 11 in)
- Position: Right midfielder

Team information
- Current team: Nyva Ternopil
- Number: 10

Youth career
- 2013: Chayka Vyshhorod
- 2014: DYuSSh Bucha
- 2014–2018: Chayka Vyshhorod

Senior career*
Years	Team	Apps	(Gls)
2018–2019	Chayka Vyshhorod	17	(1)
2019–2020	Rubikon Kyiv	13	(0)
2020–2021	Munkach Mukachevo	8	(0)
2021–2022	Lyubomyr Stavyshche	12	(1)
2022–2024	Bukovyna Chernivtsi	34	(0)
2024	Kremin Kremenchuk	22	(0)
2025–	Nyva Ternopil	35	(4)
- * Club domestic league appearances and goals as of 4 June 2026

Ivan Heorhiyovych Palamarchuk (Ukrainian: Іван Георгійович Паламарчук; born 20 March 2000) is a Ukrainian professional footballer who plays as a right midfielder for Ukrainian First League club Nyva Ternopil.

== Career ==
In summer 2022 Palamarchuk joined Ukrainian First League club Bukovyna Chernivtsi. On 9 January 2024 it was reported that Palamarchuk along with other seven players mutually terminated the contracts with Bukovyna. He played in thirty-five matches for the club and had three assists.

=== Kremin Kremenchuk ===
When Kremin players returned to training on 15 January, Palamarchuk was one of the on-trial players. At the end of January 2024 Palamarchuk signed contract with Kremin Kremenchuk. He played for the club in the Winter Cup of the Football Association of Poltava Oblast. Palamarchuk signed a two-year contract and took number 21 shirt.
