= Ukrainian League Cup =

- Founded: 2009
- Abolished: 2010
- Region: Ukraine
- Teams: 24

The Ukrainian League Cup (Ukrainian: Кубок Ліги) was a knockout cup competition in Ukrainian football, run by the Professional Football League of Ukraine for amateur and the 3rd tier (level) clubs. The tournament was organized to supplement the 2009–10 Ukrainian Second League season. The winner of the tournament received the Umbro League Cup.

== History ==
It was an experimental competition following a series of Cup of Ukrainian PFL.

=== Format ===
The format of this competition fluctuated insignificantly. It consisted of a qualification round that was followed by the first round, 1/16 of the final. Initially all rounds from the first to the semi-finals consisted of two games, on a home-away basis; later it changed with only one game played from the randomly chosen field of the participating clubs. Mainly the competition was limited to clubs that were competing in the Second League. Later, semifinalists were allowed to enter the Ukrainian Cup. The winner and runner-up of the competition were awarded a qualification to the Ukrainian Cup in 2000 and 2001.

=== First edition ===
In the 2009–10 season, the Cup began with a group tournament where teams from the 2009–10 Ukrainian Second League and amateur level competitors participated. At this stage all 24 teams were divided into eight groups. The best two teams out of each group advanced to the next round of the competition (second round) while all the last placed participants were eliminated. In the second round teams were paired with each other with the winners of each group playing at home. The winner of each pair advanced to the next round (quarter-finals). The quarter-finals took place in the same manner. These semi-finals consisted of two home-away matches, while the final took place at a neutral field. The winners of this competition were awarded the cup and the prize money (150,000 hryvnia) from Umbro, the general sponsor of the event.

== Finals ==
Year	Venue	Winner	Score	Runner-up	Semifinalists
2009–10	Nika Stadium, Oleksandriya	Nyva Vinnytsia	4–0	Hirnyk-Sport Komsomolsk	Illichivets-2 Mariupol & Myr Hornostayivka

== Performance by club ==
Club	Winners	Runner-up	Semifinalists	Winning years
Nyva Vinnytsia	1	0	0	2009–10
Hirnyk-Sport Komsomolsk	0	1	0	
Myr Hornostayivka	0	0	1	
Illichivets-2 Mariupol	0	0	1	

== See also ==
- Ukrainian PFL Cup
- Football in Ukraine
- Ukrainian Premier League
