= Dmytro Kozban =

Ukrainian footballer (born 1989)

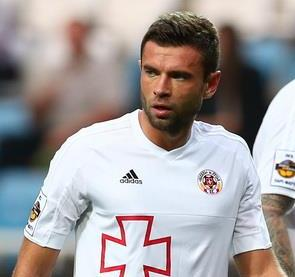
- Kozban in 2015

Personal information
- Full name: Dmytro Serhiyovych Kozban
- Date of birth: 27 April 1989 (age 37)
- Place of birth: Kramatorsk, Ukrainian SSR, Soviet Union
- Height: 1.86 m (6 ft 1 in)
- Position: Forward

Youth career
- 2003–2005: UOR Donetsk

Senior career*
| Years | Team | Apps | (Gls) |
| 2006–2007 | Inter Boyarka | 40 | (5) |
| 2007–2008 | Lviv | 37 | (3) |
| 2008 | Knyazha Schaslyve | 2 | (0) |
| 2008 | → Knyazha-2 Schaslyve | 17 | (4) |
| 2009 | Nafkom Brovary | 9 | (3) |
| 2009–2011 | Nyva Vinnytsia | 68 | (12) |
| 2012–2013 | Avanhard Kramatorsk | 42 | (10) |
| 2013–2016 | Volyn Lutsk | 40 | (6) |
| 2016–2017 | Veres Rivne | 28 | (3) |
| 2017–2018 | Motor Lublin | 31 | (12) |
| 2018–2019 | Volyn Lutsk | 26 | (5) |
| 2019 | Kremin Kremenchuk | 9 | (6) |
| 2020 | Ahrobiznes Volochysk | 7 | (1) |
| 2020–2021 | Speranța Nisporeni | 21 | (3) |
| 2021 | Nyva Vinnytsia | 9 | (0) |
| 2022 | Druzhba Myrivka | | |
| 2023 | Yasko Vinnytsia | | |
| 2023 | Kolos Polonne | | |
- * Club domestic league appearances and goals as of 27 April 2024

Dmytro Serhiyovych Kozban (Ukrainian: Дмитро Сергійович Козьбан; born 27 April 1989) is a Ukrainian professional footballer who plays as a striker.

He has previously played Inter Boyarka, FC Lviv, Knyazha Schaslyve, Nafkom Brovary, Nyva Vinnytsia, Avanhard Kramatorsk, Volyn Lutsk and Veres Rivne.

== Career ==
On 4 July 2017, Kozban signed a contract with III liga club Motor Lublin.

Kozban was recognized as the best player of November 2019 in the Ukrainian Premier League.
