= Svyatoslav Syrota =

Ukrainian footballer

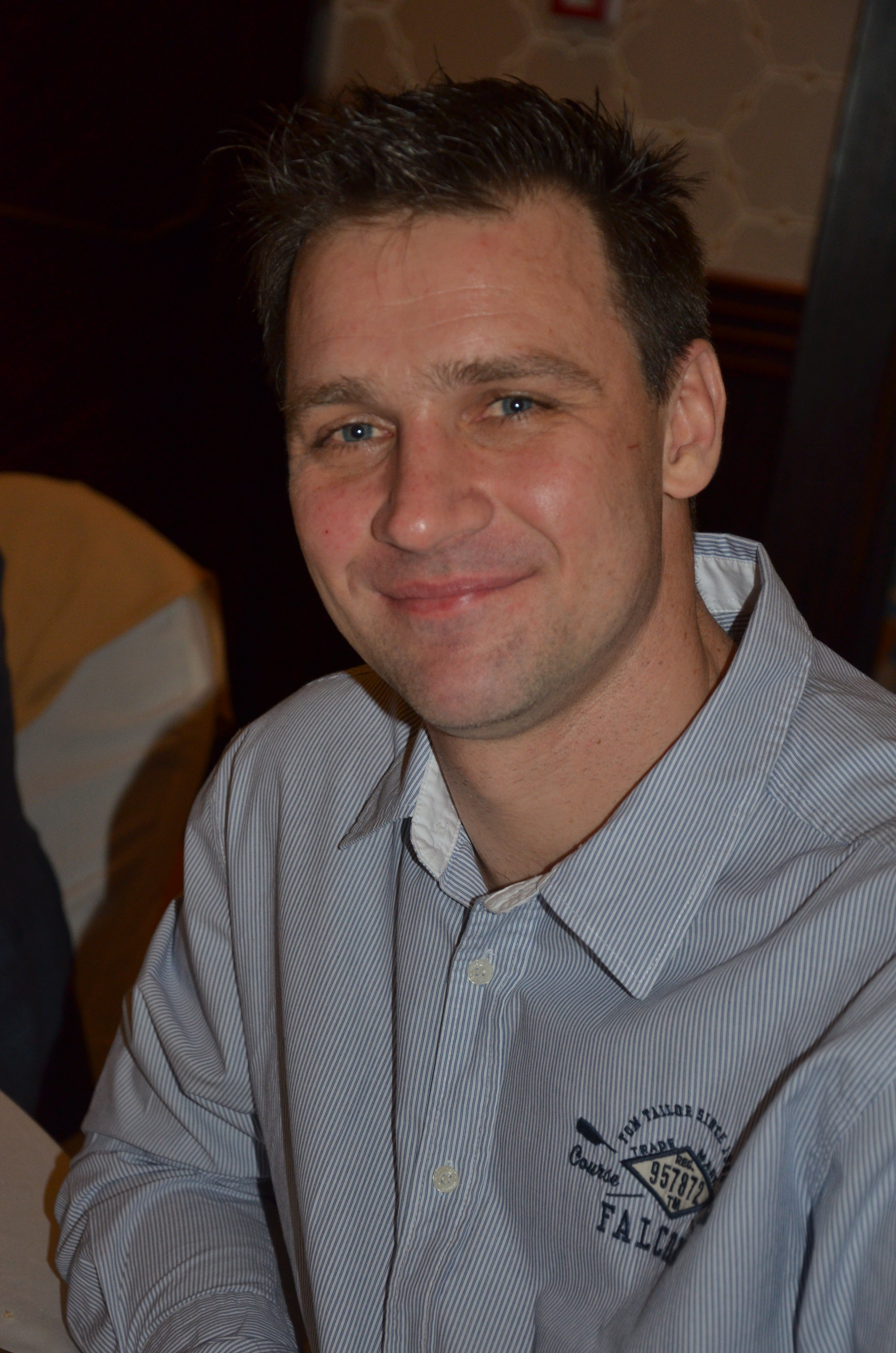
- Svyatoslav Syrota in 2010

Personal information
- Full name: Svyatoslav Anatoliyovych Syrota
- Date of birth: 1 October 1970 (age 56)
- Place of birth: Kyiv, Soviet Union (now Ukraine)
- Height: 1.92 m (6 ft 3 1/2 in)
- Position: Goalkeeper

Youth career
- Dynamo Kyiv

Senior career*
Years	Team	Apps	(Gls)
1987–1992	Dynamo Kyiv	0	(0)
1992	→ Dynamo-2 Kyiv	2	(0)
1993–1994	Veres Rivne	45	(0)
1994–1996	Dnipro Dnipropetrovsk	30	(0)
1996	Nyva Ternopil	0	(0)
1997	Gazovik-Gazprom Izhevsk	14	(0)
1998	Dustlik	10	(0)
Total		101	(0)

Managerial career
- 2015–2016: Zaria Bălți (sporting director)
- * Club domestic league appearances and goals

Svyatoslav Anatoliyovych Syrota (Ukrainian: Святослав Анатолійович Сирота; born 1 October 1970) is a Ukrainian sports functionary and former player. Master of Sports of Ukraine (1995).

== Biography ==
At 24 he finished the Ukrainian State University physical fitness and sport. From 1987 to 1998 he played for various clubs such as Dynamo Kyiv, Dnipro Dnipropetrovsk etc. From 2002 to 2004 he worked as the technical secretary for the Kyiv municipal Federation of Football. After retiring player career became a football official. In July 2008 Syrota was appointed the executive director of the Professional Football League of Ukraine.

== President of Professional Football League ==
From 2008 to 2010 was the president of the Professional Football League. Syrota was elected on 16 December 2008 at the 3rd report-electoral Conference of PFL in the building of Trade Union Federation of Ukraine. Initially there were six candidates: Ravil Safiullin (president of PFL), Miletiy Balchos, Yuriy Malyshev, Serhiy Mokhnyk, Anatoliy Revutsky, and Svyatoslav Syrota. Eventually three candidates withdrew among which were Ravil Safiullin, Miletiy Balchos, and Anatoliy Revutsky. The conference delegates were left to choose among three remaining candidates. The executive director of PFL Svyatoslav Syrota was elected after he received 39 votes. Mokhnyk received seven votes and Malyshev - one.

During a session of the central council of Professional Football League of Ukraine on 25 November 2009, Syrota was dismissed from performing functions of the league's president until the next report-electoral conference. The central council gave him time until 23 December to explain why there is a suspicion of him mishandling the league's funds. The league's first deputy of president Mykola Lavrenko (the president of PFC Olexandria) became ex officio the league's acting president.

Syrota issue legal proceedings to the Civil Court with a lawsuit on PFL in 2013. Civil Court fully justify legally Syrota and nullify the actions of Professional Football League of Ukraine.

Preceded by Ravil Safiullin	Presidents of PFL; December 2008 – December 2009	Succeeded by Mykola Lavrenko (acting)
