= Danylo Sydorenko (footballer, born 1999) =

Ukrainian footballer (born 1999)

Personal information
- Full name: Danylo Oleksiiovych Sydorenko
- Date of birth: 18 February 1999 (age 27)
- Place of birth: Kirovohrad, Ukraine
- Height: 1.89 m (6 ft 2 in)
- Position: Defender

Team information
- Current team: Ahrobiznes Volochysk
- Number: 33

Youth career
- 2012–2016: Zirka Kropyvnytskyi

Senior career*
Years	Team	Apps	(Gls)
2016–2018	Zirka Kropyvnytskyi	0	(0)
2018	Krystal Chortkiv	6	(0)
2019	Ahronyva Zavodske	0	(0)
2019–2020	Zirka Kropyvnytskyi	21	(1)
2019–2020	Tekhnopol-Ahro	14	(2)
2020–2021	Peremoha Dnipro	36	(1)
2021–2022	OKVP Dnipro-Kirivihrad	4	(0)
2022–2024	Kremin Kremenchuk	41	(1)
2024–	Ahrobiznes Volochysk	46	(1)
- * Club domestic league appearances and goals as of 3 June 2026

Danylo Sydorenko (Ukrainian: Данило Олексійович Сидоренко; born 18 February 1999) is a Ukrainian professional footballer who plays as a defender for Ukrainian club FC Ahrobiznes Volochysk.

== Career ==
Sydorenko began his football education at Zirka Kropyvnytskyi playing in the same group as Danylo Falkovskyi. He played for the Zirka U-19 team for 27 matches. Leaving Zirka he joined amateur club FC Krystal Chortkiv from Ternipil Oblast. During the 2018–19 season he featured in 6 matches. He moved to another amateur club Ahronyva Zavodske in Ternipil Oblast Championship.

=== Zirka ===
Sydorenko returned to Zirka main team before their 2019–20 season in Kyrovohrad Oblast Championship. He scored his first goal on 3 October 2019. He played 21 match for Zirka.

=== Peremoha ===
Sydorenko moved to a Ukrainian Second League club Peremoha Dnipro during summer of 2020. He made his debut for Peremoha on 6 September 2020 playing full 90 minutes in a 0:0 draw against Balkany Zorya. During first part of the season he played especially consistently. He scored his only goal for the club on 27 March 2021 in a 2:1 loss against Balkany Zorya. During his second season at the club, Danylo featured in 16 matches.

=== Kremin ===
Next season he moved to Ukrainian First League club Kremin Kremenchuk. Sydorenko signed a two-year contract and took number 33 shirt. He made his debut for Kremin on 2 September 2022 playing full 90 minutes in a 3:1 win against Skoruk Tomakivka. On 12 June 2024 Sydorenko was released by Kremin having made thirty-seven appearances and scoring one goal.

=== Ahrobiznes ===
Sydorenko joined Ukrainian First League club Ahrobiznes Volochysk in June 2024.
