= Oleksandr Kadenko =

President of PFL Ukraine

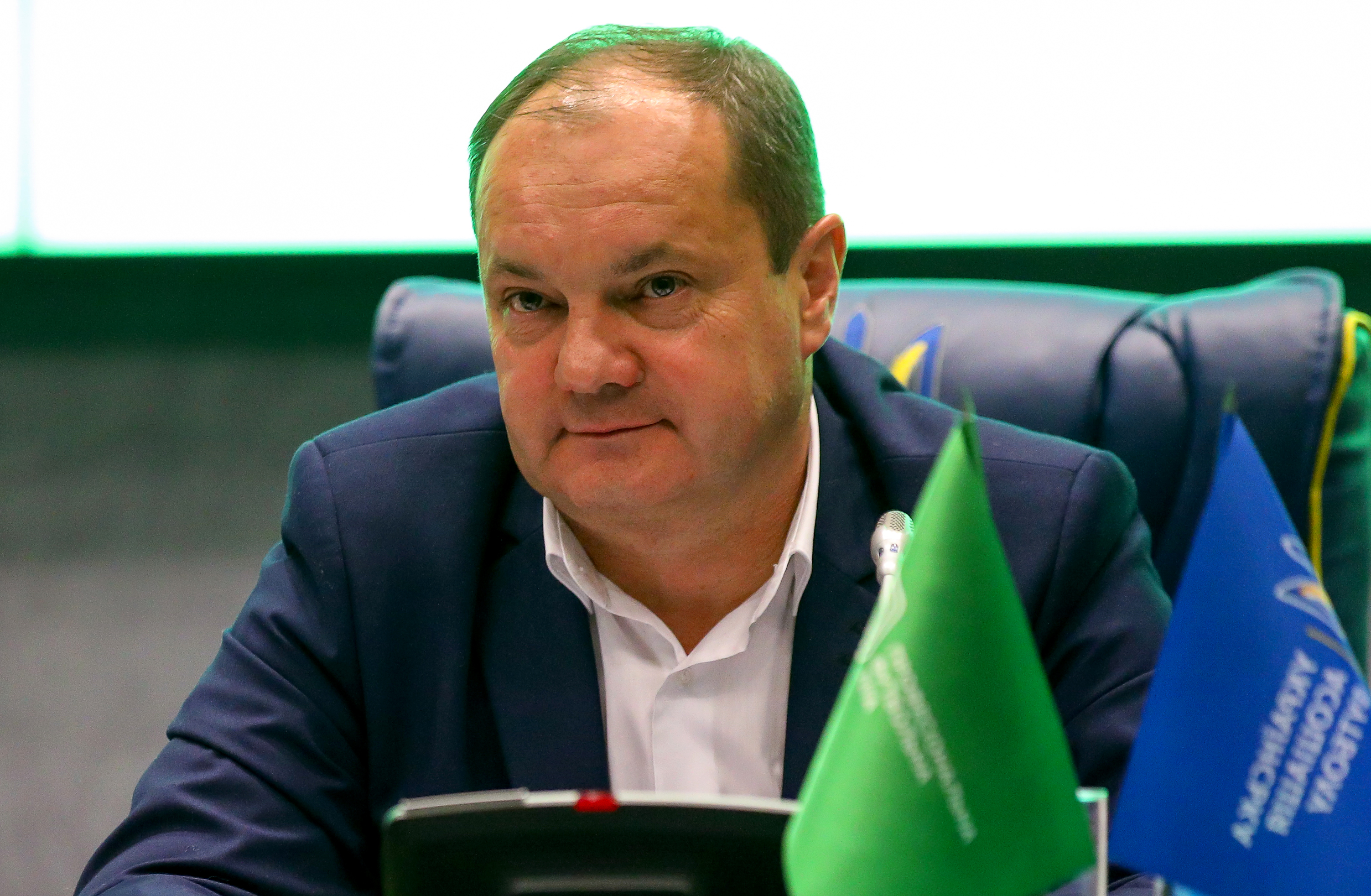
in 2025

Oleksandr Kadenko (Ukrainian: Олександр Каденко; born 10 June 1974 in Vasylkiv, Kyiv Oblast) is a president of the Professional Football League of Ukraine (PFL), a Ukrainian sports functionary and a former assistant referee of lower leagues and regional level.

== Biography ==
Until 2020 Kadenko served as a first vice-president of the Association of Amateur Football of Ukraine (AAFU). On August 28, 2020, Kadenko was elected as the president of the Association of Amateur Football of Ukraine (AAFU).

Kadenko has been a president of the Professional Football League of Ukraine (PFL) since August 5, 2020 and on September 29, 2020, he was officially elected by the PFL Council.

As the president of the PFL, Kadenko also is a member of the Ukrainian Association of Football (UAF) Executive Committee.

In August of 2021 along with UAF General Secretary Zapisotskyi, Kadenko handed over 100 balls from UEFA to the Shakhtar Social Foundation.

On November 1, 2022, Kadenko, along with other distinguished members of the Ukrainian football community including the UAF president Andriy Pavelko as well as football legends like Oleksiy Mykhailychenko and Oleh Protasov, opened a newly built stadium near Kyiv.

== Honours and recognitions ==
- UEFA Grassroots Award (2010)

Sporting positions
Preceded by Serhiy Makarov	Presidents of PFL; 2020–	Succeeded by incumbent
