= Miletiy Balchos =

Soviet football administrator

Miletiy Balchos (Ukrainian: Мілетій Володимирович Бальчос; born May 15, 1949, Zalistsi, Shumsk Raion, Ternopil Oblast) is a football administrator, coach and a veteran of the Soviet–Afghan War. He is a Merited Employee of Physical Culture and Sports of Ukraine (2006).

== Biography ==
Miletiy Balchos was born in a village of Zalistsi that geographically is located in a historic region of Volhynia. In 1968, he finished a Medical College N2 (Kiev) as a medical assistant. After the graduation Balchos for over 20 years in 1968-1991 served in the Soviet Armed Forces as a medical assistant, headed a pharmacy at a regimental medical center was a secretary of his unit's Komsomol Committee (politruk) and in charge of a military sports complex. In 1977 Balchos graduated from the Institute of Marxism-Leninism of the Soviet Armed Forces.

With the start of military operations in Afghanistan in the late 1970s, he participated as a member of a group of combat operations support of the General Headquarters of the Soviet Armed Forces.

Already in 1982 Balchos has started his football career as a head coach of FC Zirka Berdychiv which was a farm club SKA Lviv and which he coached until 1991. Note that in 1982 SKA Lviv was merged with Karpaty Lviv as SKA Karpaty Lviv to participate in the Soviet First League. In 1986 and 1988 Zirka Berdychiv made it to the finals of the Ukrainian Amateur Cup, which it both lost. Miletiy Balchos also headed a collective team of the Carpathian Military District. After the fall of the Soviet Union he continued his coaching career at lower levels in Ukraine until 1994. In 1995–96 Balchos worked as a staff at Dynamo Kyiv.

From 1996 until 2002 Balchos worked as an administrator at the newly established Professional Football League of Ukraine (PFL). In 2000, he became a deputy chairman of the Control Disciplinary Committee of the Football Federation of Ukraine which Balchos held until 2008. In 2002, he also was appointed as a deputy of the National Team Committee and the Professional Football Committee of the federation, from which he also was released in 2008.

Since 2009 Balchos once again returned to PFL and in March 2010 he was elected as the president. He was nominated as a candidate from Stal Dniprodzerzhynsk, Ros Bila Tserkva, MFC Mykolaiv, Enerhetyk Burshtyn, FC Kharkiv. His main opponent for the position was Yuriy Kindzersky who was nominated from FC Lviv collected 21 votes against Balochos's 24. Also another candidate was Oleh Karavanskyi nominated from Nyva Vinnytsia.

== Awards ==
Among his multiple awards Balchos has three combat awards including the Order of the Red Star.

== See also ==
- 2009–10 Ukrainian First League

Sporting positions
| Preceded by Mykola Lavrenko (acting) | Presidents of PFL; March 2010 – June 2014 | Succeeded by Serhiy Makarov |
