= Dmytro Prokopchuk =

Ukrainian footballer

Personal information
- Full name: Dmytro Vasylyovych Prokopchuk
- Date of birth: 4 November 2000 (age 26)
- Place of birth: Chernivtsi, Ukraine
- Height: 1.77 m (5 ft 10 in)
- Position: Left midfielder

Team information
- Current team: Kremin Kremenchuk
- Number: 23

Youth career
- 2013–2014: Olimpik-UOR Donetsk
- 2014–2017: Shakhtar Donetsk

Senior career*
| Years | Team | Apps | (Gls) |
| 2017–2019 | Olimpik Donetsk | 0 | (0) |
| 2019 | Vorskla Poltava | 0 | (0) |
| 2019–2021 | Mariupol | 0 | (0) |
| 2021–2022 | Kramatorsk | 0 | (0) |
| 2022–2023 | Mariupol | 4 | (0) |
| 2023–2024 | Bukovyna Chernivtsi | 16 | (0) |
| 2024– | Kremin Kremenchuk | 12 | (0) |
- * Club domestic league appearances and goals as of 31 December 2024

Dmytro Vasylyovych Prokopchuk (Ukrainian: Дмитро Васильович Прокопчук; born 4 November 2000) is a Ukrainian professional footballer who plays as a left midfielder for Ukrainian club Kremin Kremenchuk.

== Career ==
=== Kramatorsk ===
He made his professional debut playing for Kramatorsk on 18 August 2021 in the Ukrainian Cup match against Alians Lypova Dolyna.
