= Hornostaivka, Henichesk Raion, Kherson Oblast =

Rural locality in Kherson Oblast, Ukraine

Hornostaivka Горностаївка
- Village
- Interactive map of Hornostaivka
- Location in Ukraine Hornostaivka (Ukraine)
- Coordinates: 46°31′05″N 34°17′23″E
- Country: Ukraine
- Oblast: Kherson Oblast
- Raion: Henichesk Raion

Area
  - Total: 46.757 km^{2} (18.053 sq mi)
- Elevation: 32 m (105 ft)

Population (2001)
  - Total: 603
  - Density: 12.9/km^{2} (33/sq mi)
- Time zone: UTC+2 (EET)
  - Summer (DST): UTC+3 (EEST)
- Postal code: 75331
- Area code: +380 5548

Hornostaivka (Ukrainian: Горностаївка) is a village in Henichesk Raion, Kherson Oblast, southern Ukraine. Hornostaivka belongs to the Novotroitske settlement hromada, one of the hromadas of Ukraine. The village had a population of 603.

== History ==
Hornostaivka was founded on 21 October 1897. During the Great Patriotic War, the village was occupied by German troops from 13 September 1941 to 30 October 1943, when it was recaptured by Soviet troops. In 1987, the agricultural enterprise "Myr" was founded, which later sponsored the professional football club named Myr (as the head of the farm is its president).

In the village, there is currently a kindergarten, a cultural center, a football stadium, the company "Mir", a machine and tractor station, a mill, and a bakery.

== Administrative status ==
Until 18 July 2020, Hornostaivka belonged to Novotroitske Raion. The raion was abolished in July 2020 as part of the administrative reform of Ukraine, which reduced the number of raions of Kherson Oblast to five. The area of Novotroitske Raion was merged into Henichesk Raion.

== Sports ==
The village was home to the professional football club of FC Myr Hornostayivka. The team played in the Ukrainian Second League. It was founded in 1994, initially playing in the Kherson Oblast Championship. The club ended in 2019 when the PFL conference voted to exclude the club from the league, as the Myr players had received the status of free agents at the end of the season. There was no reason provided for the dissolution of the club.
