= FC Myr Hornostayivka =

- Full name: FC Myr Hornostayivka
- Founded: 1994
- Dissolved: 2019
- Ground: Zatys Stadium, Hornostayivka
- Capacity: 1,400
- Chairman: Ivan Dotsenko
- Manager: Viktor Bohatyr
- League: Ukrainian Second League
- 2018-19: 5th of 10

FC Myr Hornostayivka was a professional Ukrainian football club from the village of Hornostayivka, Novotroyiske Raion (district), Kherson Oblast, just north of the Crimean peninsula.

== History ==
The team is supported by the agricultural company "Myr" in the village. The name in the Ukrainian language means peace.

The club competed in the Ukrainian Amateur championship the Ukrainian Amateur Cup from 2008–11 as well as the 2009–10 Ukrainian League Cup.

The club submitted its license to the Professional Football League of Ukraine and was accepted into the Ukrainian Second League for the 2011–12 season.

After a promising start to the 2013–14 Ukrainian Second League the club's administration decided to withdraw from the Professional Football League of Ukraine and return to the amateur competition.

The club entered the Ukrainian Amateur championship for 2014.

== Honors ==
Emblem when Amateurs

- Ukrainian Amateur Champions (4th Level)

2010

- Kherson Oblast Champions

1997, 2005, 2006, 2007

- Kherson Oblast Cup Champions

2006, 2007

== League and cup history (Ukraine) ==
Season	Div.	Pos.	Pl.	W	D	L	GS	GA	P	Domestic Cup	Other		Notes
2008	4th (1st round)	2	8	4	2	2	12	11	14				advanced to finals
2008	4th (final round)	3	3	1	1	1	6	7	4				
2009	4th (1st round)	1	6	4	1	1	14	6	13				withdrew
2010	4th (1st round)	1	8	6	0	2	16	8	18		UAC	1/2 finals	advanced to finals
2010	4th (final round)	1	2	1	1	0	6	3	4		UAC	1/2 finals	Won final game
2011	4th (1st round)	3	10	5	2	3	17	7	17				obtained professional status during season
2011–12	3rd "B"	7	26	13	7	6	36	26	46	1/64 finals			
2012–13	3rd "B"	6	24	13	3	8	37	33	42	Withdrew			
2012–13	3rd "2"	6	10	1	3	6	5	13	6	Withdrew			Stage 2
2013–14	3rd	14	36	11	4	21	32	27	37	1/16 finals			Withdrew
2014	4th (1st round)	3	8	3	2	3	9	9	11		UAC	1/2 finals	eliminated in the first round
2015	4th (1st round)	3	6	1	3	2	6	6	6				obtained professional status during season
2015–16	3rd	11	26	8	3	15	38	47	27	1/16 finals			
2016–17	3rd	9	32	13	9	10	39	31	48	1/16 finals			
2017–18	3rd "B"	5	33	14	11	8	47	30	53	1/64 finals			
2018–19	3rd "B"	5	27	14	3	10	41	30	45	1/16 finals			withdrew

== Coaches ==
- 1996–2016: Oleksandr Sapelnyak
- 2016–2017: Viktor Bohatyr
- 2017–2019: Oleksandr Sapelnyak
