= Yunist Stadium (Horishni Plavni) =

Football stadium in Ukraine

Coordinates: 49°00′15″N 33°38′53″E

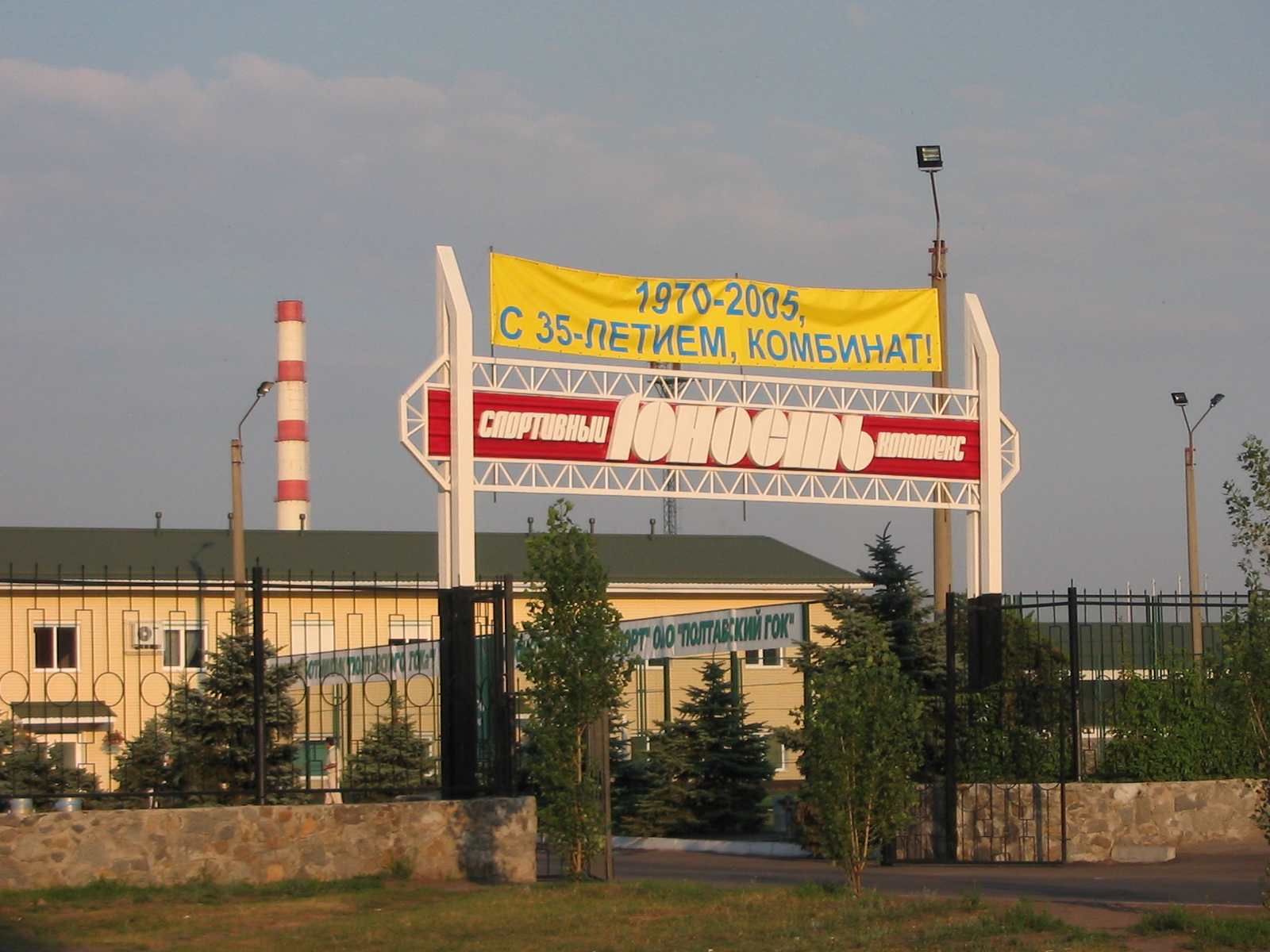
- Interactive map of Yunist Stadium
- Location: Horishni Plavni
- Capacity: 2,500 (football)

Tenants
- Hirnyk-Sport; Kremin

Yunist Stadium (Ukrainian: Стадіон Юність) is a football stadium in Horishni Plavni. For the 2008-09 season of Ukrainian Second League, the stadium was a home arena for FC Hirnyk-Sport Komsomolsk and FC Kremin Kremenchuk.
