= Sports School Zenit Boyarka =

Ukrainian sports school

Sports School Zenit Boyarka (Ukrainian: ДЮСШ Зеніт Боярка) is a Ukrainian sports school located in city of Boyarka that was fielding its association football team Zenit at the Ukrainian national amateur competitions in 2008 and 2009 as well as the 2009–10 Ukrainian League Cup.

It sometimes is being confused with another professional FC Inter Boyarka which folded the same year when Zenit appeared in the city. The club moved to Boyarka in 2007 from a town of Volodarka.
