= FC Hirnyk-Sport Horishni Plavni =

Hirnyk-Sport Horishni Plavni
- Full name: FC Hirnyk-Sport Horishni Plavni
- Founded: 1989
- Ground: Yunist Stadium
- Capacity: 2,500
- Chairman: Petro Kaplun
- Manager: Jovan Markoski
- League: Ukrainian Second League
- 2024–25: Ukrainian Second League, Group B, 5th of 10
- Website: gornyak-sport.com
Home colours	Away colours

FC Hirnyk-Sport Horishni Plavni is a Ukrainian football club based in Horishni Plavni, Poltava Oblast. The club competes in the First League.

The club is sponsored by Ferrexpo.

== History ==
Old emblem of the club "FC Hirnyk-Sport Komsomolsk" used until 2017

The club was founded in 1989. After some above average performances in the KFK 3rd Zone (Central Ukraine) Amateur Championship the club's administration decided to enter the professional league. However, at this level the club has continually struggled and has had only 2 winning seasons since entering this level of competition.

The club plays its football games at "Yunist" (Youth) Stadium. According to the Vorskla website the stadium has a capacity of 5,000 spectators, while the website of Hirnyk reports a mere 2,500.

The club was promoted to the Ukrainian First League for the first time in 2014.

== Team names ==
Year	Name
1989–92	Lokomotiv
1993–95	Hirnyk
1995–	Hirnyk-Sport

== Honors ==
- Ukrainian Druha Liha
  - Champions (1): 2013–14
- Ukrainian League Cup
  - Runners-up (1): 2009–10

== League and cup history ==
Season	Div.	Pos.	Pl.	W	D	L	GS	GA	P	Domestic Cup	Other		Notes
1992–93	4th (Amatorska Liha)												
1993–94	4th (Amatorska Liha)												
1994–95	4th (Amatorska Liha)												
1995–96	3rd (Druha Liha)	16	38	10	8	20	33	71	38	Did not enter			
1996–97	3rd (Druha Liha)	14	32	10	6	16	20	32	36	1st Qual. round			
1997–98	3rd (Druha Liha)	4	32	12	11	9	39	35	47	3rd Qual. round			
1998–99	3rd (Druha Liha)	4	26	13	6	7	36	31	41	1st Qual. round			
1999–00	3rd (Druha Liha)	7	26	10	5	11	33	41	35	DNQ	2L	1/4 finals	
2000–01	3rd (Druha Liha)	10	28	9	4	15	26	45	31	DNQ	2L	1/4 finals	
2001–02	3rd (Druha Liha)	17	34	6	6	22	32	60	24	1st round			
2002–03	3rd (Druha Liha)	15	30	7	6	17	27	48	27	1/32 finals			
2003–04	3rd (Druha Liha)	14	30	10	5	15	40	40	35	1/32 finals			
2004–05	3rd (Druha Liha)	9	28	10	0	18	35	49	30	1/32 finals			Group C
2005–06	3rd (Druha Liha)	8	24	10	4	10	30	31	34	1/32 finals			Group C
2006–07	3rd (Druha Liha)	15	28	5	2	21	23	48	17	1/32 finals			
2007–08	3rd (Druha Liha)	15	34	9	7	18	38	59	34	1/32 finals			
2008–09	3rd (Druha Liha)	13	34	9	8	17	28	45	35	1/64 finals			
2009–10	3rd (Druha Liha)	11	26	5	7	14	21	35	22	1/64 finals	LC	Final	
2010–11	3rd (Druha Liha)	9	22	6	4	12	17	29	22	1/16 finals			
2011–12	3rd (Druha Liha)	9	26	6	8	12	28	39	26	1/64 finals			
2012–13	3rd (Druha Liha)	11	24	5	3	16	25	50	18	1/16 finals			qualified to relegation group 4
2012–13	3rd (Druha Liha)	3	8	5	1	2	14	7	16	1/16 finals			
2013–14	3rd (Druha Liha)	1	36	25	4	7	68	31	79	1/32 finals			Promoted
2014–15	2nd (Persha Liha)	3	30	16	9	5	44	24	57	1/32 finals			
2015–16	2nd (Persha Liha)	12	30	8	9	13	30	35	33	1/16 finals			
2016–17	2nd (Persha Liha)	11	34	12	7	15	47	54	43	1/32 finals			
2017–18	2nd (Persha Liha)	8	34	16	2	16	30	40	50	1/32 finals			
2018–19	2nd (Persha Liha)	12	28	5	12	11	24	43	27	1/32 finals			
2019–20	2nd (Persha Liha)	9	30	12	3	15	42	48	39	1/8 finals			
2020–21	2nd (Persha Liha)	9	30	11	5	14	43	45	38	1/16 finals			

== Players ==
=== Current squad ===
As of 4 May 2026

Note: Flags indicate national team as defined under FIFA eligibility rules; some limited exceptions apply. Players may hold more than one non-FIFA nationality.

No.	Pos.	Nation	Player
1	GK	UKR	Yaroslav Burakov
4	DF	UKR	Valentyn Tkach
7	MF	UKR	Viktor Lavruk
8	MF	UKR	Oleksandr Taranenko
10	MF	UKR	Oleksandr Kuts
11	FW	UKR	Artem Vlasenko
15	DF	UKR	Kyrylo Popovych
16	MF	NGA	Innocent Odoh
17	FW	UKR	Rostyslav Polyukhovych

No.	Pos.	Nation	Player
20	MF	UKR	Eduard Khachatryan
22	DF	UKR	Dmytro Samoylovych
23	DF	UKR	Oleksiy Plys
26	MF	UKR	Dmytro Pokas
30	MF	NGA	Ekemini Nsini Effiong
33	MF	UKR	Oleksandr Hrizdak
66	MF	NGA	Richmond Chukwuemeka
77	FW	UKR	Kyrylo Tokar
90	MF	UKR	Nikita Bahinskyi

=== Out on loan ===
Note: Flags indicate national team as defined under FIFA eligibility rules; some limited exceptions apply. Players may hold more than one non-FIFA nationality.

No. / Pos. / Nation / Player	No. / Pos. / Nation / Player

== Managers ==
- Ihor Zhabchenko (2013–2016)
- Serhiy Puchkov (2016 – 31 Dec 2018)
- Volodymyr Mazyar (1 Jan 2019 – 9 Sept 2019)
- Ihor Zhabchenko (15 Sept 2019 – present)
