= FC Kremin Kremenchuk =

Association football club based in Kremenchuk, Ukraine

Kremin
- Full name: Football Club Kremin Kremenchuk
- Founded: 1959; 67 years ago, as Dnipro; October 23, 2003; 22 years ago, as Kremin
- Ground: Kremin-Arena, Kremenchuk
- Capacity: 1,500
- President: Serhiy Kovnir
- Head coach: Ihor Klymovskyi
- League: Ukrainian Second League
- 2024–25: Ukrainian First League, 17th of 17 (relegated)
- Website: https://fckremen.com.ua/
Home colours	Away colours

Football Club Kremin Kremenchuk (Ukrainian: ФК Кремінь Кременчук; Russian: Кремень Кременчуг, romanized: Kremen Kremenchug) is a professional football club based in Kremenchuk, Ukraine. The current club is administered by the city of Kremenchuk and was established in 2003, but it traces its heritage to the previously existing clubs of 1959–1970 and 1985–2001.

== History ==
After the World War II and until 1960, the main football team in Kremenchuk was Vahonobudivnyk Kremenchuk which represented the local railcar factory. In 1963, another Kremenchuk team which represented road equipment manufacturer became the first club from Kremenchuk that obtained the professional status (team of masters). The team played under the name of Dnipro. The club only played for six seasons in the Soviet lower leagues before it was dissolved. During that time the team was coached by Borys Usenko. In 1970, the club has folded.

In 1985, the club was reestablished when Naftovyk Kremenchuk was merged with SC KrAZ Kremenchuk. Naftovyk Kremenchuk was sponsored by the Kremenchuk Oil Refinery, while SC KrAZ Kremenchuk was a sports club of the Ukrainian truck builder AutoKrAZ. The new club under the name Kremin has won the Soviet amateur football competition in 1988 which was taking place in Kryvyi Rih and the next year entered the Soviet Second League competitions. After Kremin was admitted to the All-Union level, at republican level Kremenchuk was represented by Naftovyk Kremenchuk.

After fall of the Soviet Union, from 1992 to 1997, Kremin has played in the Ukrainian Premier League. The club was granted with opportunity to participate in the top tier for being one of the top 9 (of 11) Ukrainian teams from the West Zone of the Soviet Second League in 1991. After being relegated in 1997, Kremin spent the next two seasons after that in Ukrainian First League and was demoted further to Ukrainian Second League in 1999. Soon after that the club folded and ceased to exist.

Soon after liquidation of the club, in 2003 the city council adopted a decision to revive similar club financed from a local budget. Since the 2005–06 season, the city's club has taken part in the Ukrainian Second League replacing another team Vorskla-2 Poltava.

Before the start of the 2020–21 season, MFC Kremin Kremenchuk changed its name to FC Kremin Kremenchuk.

Kremin Kremenchuk's best achievement in the Ukrainian Premier League was 9th place (twice, in 1992–93 and 1995–96), while reaching the semi-finals in the Ukrainian National Cup in 1996.

== Crest and colours ==
Coat of arms of Kremenchuk

Home colors are blue shirts, blue shorts, and blue socks. Away uniforms are white shirts, white shorts, and white socks.

The team kits are produced by Puma AG and the shirt sponsor is Kremenchukmyaso.

Since the club's foundation, Kremin has had five main crests.

Club logo (1980s)

Club logo (1992–2001)

Club logo (2003–2020)

Club logo (2020–2021)

Club logo (2021–present)

== Stadium ==
From its inception the team played at the Polytechnic Stadium, however, that stadium has fallen into disrepair, and after one season of play at Yunist Stadium in Komsomolsk, the team have moved into their brand new stadium. City officials built FC Kremin Stadium which has covered stands for 1500 spectators and artificial pitch surface.

== Players ==
As of 2 May 2025 Note: Flags indicate national team as defined under FIFA eligibility rules; some limited exceptions apply. Players may hold more than one non-FIFA nationality.

No.	Pos.	Nation	Player
7	MF	UKR	Bohdan Melnyk
10	MF	UKR	Andrii Savitskyi
11	MF	UKR	Valentyn Maksymenko
13	DF	UKR	Danylo Sydorenko
14	MF	UKR	Andrii Koloskov
15	MF	UKR	Maksym Bondar
18	MF	UKR	Nazarii Pasternak
19	MF	UKR	Heorhii Kovalskyi
22	GK	UKR	Pavlo Lazarenko
23	MF	UKR	Dmytro Prokopchuk

No.	Pos.	Nation	Player
25	MF	UKR	Mykhailo Klepko
26	MF	UKR	Dmytro Pokas
27	MF	UKR	Vladyslav Molko
40	GK	UKR	Vadym Dmytrochenko
47	FW	UKR	Anatolii Stetsiuk
51	FW	UKR	Zlat Zlatiev
72	DF	UKR	Roman Tylokha
71	GK	UKR	Artem Matus
79	DF	UKR	Andrii Borovskyi
91	DF	UKR	Danylo Arkusha

=== Out on loan ===
Note: Flags indicate national team as defined under FIFA eligibility rules; some limited exceptions apply. Players may hold more than one non-FIFA nationality.

No.	Pos.	Nation	Player

== Management and staff ==
=== Current staff ===
Management and staff as of 25 September 2023
Position	Name
Manager	(Ukraine) Ihor Klymovskyi
Assistant coaches	(Ukraine) Dmytro Nazarenko
Assistant coaches	(Ukraine) Ruslan Umanets
Goalkeeping coach	(Ukraine) Serhii Karpov

== League and cup history ==
=== Dnipro (1959–1970) ===
The club was named Torpedo for the 1959 season. Dnipro was sponsored by the Kremenchuk Factory of Road Equipment "Kredmash". Since 1963, it participated at the professional level.

Season	Div.	Pos.	Pl.	W	D	L	GS	GA	P	Soviet Cup	Europe	Notes
1962	Poltava Oblast competitions											lost promotional playoff
1963	3rd Ukraine "1"	20	38	5	8	25	32	82	14			
1964	3rd Ukraine "2"	16	30	7	5	18	24	54	19			
1965	3rd Ukraine "1"	5	30	9	13	8	21	21	31	1/8 finals		
1965	3rd Ukraine "1"	4	10	3	3	4	9	9	9	1/8 finals		Play-off
1966	3rd Ukraine "2"	3	38	19	12	7	44	26	50	Winners (Zone 2)		
1966	3rd Ukraine "2"	X	2	0	1	1	1	4	1	Winners (Zone 2)		Play-off lost
1967	3rd Ukraine "2"	3	40	22	6	12	51	33	50	1/16 finals		
1967	3rd Ukraine "2"	3	5	2	1	2	2	2	5	1/16 finals		Play-off, Promoted
1968	2nd Group 2	18	40	7	14	19	23	46	28	1/64 finals		
1968	2nd Group 2	4	5	2	1	2	5	4	5	1/64 finals		Play-off, Relegated
1969	3rd Ukraine "1"	5	40	17	15	8	45	27	49			

=== Kremin (1985–2001) ===
The club was created out of the team of Kremenchuk Oil Refinery Plant, FC Naftovyk Kremin and SC KrAZ, sponsored by the AutoKrAZ.

==== Soviet championship (1985–1991) ====
Season	Div.	Pos.	Pl.	W	D	L	GS	GA	P	Domestic Cup	Europe	Notes
1986	Ukraine KFK "4"	3	14	7	4	3	23	11	18			
1987	Ukraine KFK "4"	1	16	13	2	1	47	13	28			
1987	Ukraine KFK finals	2	5	4	0	1	12	4	8			
1988	Ukraine KFK "4"	1	20	14	4	2	46	14	32			
1988	Ukraine KFK finals	1	5	4	0	1	12	7	8			
1989	3rd	6	52	21	18	13	59	50	60			VI Zone
1990	3rd	10	42	16	11	15	49	45	43			West Zone
1991	3rd	13	42	16	9	17	56	50	41			West Zone

==== Ukrainian championship (1992–2001) ====
Season	Div.	Pos.	Pl.	W	D	L	GS	GA	P	Domestic Cup	Europe	Notes
1992	1st	7	18	4	8	6	17	23	16	1/8 finals		Group A
1992–93	1st	9	30	8	11	11	23	40	27	1/8 finals		
1993–94	1st	15	34	9	8	17	26	39	26	1/4 finals		
1994–95	1st	10	34	12	6	16	42	54	42	1/4 finals		
1995–96	1st	9	34	14	4	16	48	56	46	1/2 finals		
1996–97	1st	15	30	7	3	16	28	57	24	1/8 finals		Relegated
1997–98	2nd	14	42	16	7	19	55	53	45	1/32 finals		
1998–99	2nd	17	38	11	7	20	34	63	40	1/16 finals		Relegated
1999–00	3rd "C"	2	26	18	1	7	44	22	55	1/8 finals		
2000–01	3rd "C"	14	30	7	7	16	24	38	28	1/8 finals		Withdrawn

=== MFC Kremin (2003–2020) ===
On 23 October 2003, the Kremenchuk city council created a city football team MFC Kremin Kremenchuk.

Season	Div.	Pos.	Pl.	W	D	L	GS	GA	P	Domestic Cup	Europe	Notes
2004	4th	4	6	1	2	3	7	9	5			Group 6
2005–06	3rd "C"	9	24	9	6	9	22	34	33	1/64 finals		
2006–07	3rd "B"	14	28	6	7	15	20	35	25	1/32 finals		
2007–08	3rd "B"	8	34	14	8	12	49	46	50	1/32 finals		
2008–09	3rd "B"	14	34	10	7	17	43	52	34	1/32 finals		–3
2009–10	3rd "B"	2	26	15	9	2	41	21	54	1/64 finals		
2010–11	3rd "B"	3	22	13	4	5	37	20	43	1/8 finals		
2011–12	3rd "B"	5	26	16	3	7	34	23	51	1/16 finals		
2012–13	3rd "B"	5	24	12	7	5	39	21	43	1/16 finals		
2012–13	3rd "2"	5	34	12	14	8	46	31	50	1/16 finals		Promotion Group 2
2013–14	3rd	6/19	36	19	7	10	54	28	64	1/32 finals		
2014–15	3rd	3/10	27	14	6	7	50	30	48	1/16 finals		lost promotion playoff
2015–16	3rd	8/14	26	11	7	8	43	31	40	1/32 finals		
2016–17	3rd	3/17	32	21	5	6	67	29	68	1/32 finals		Promoted
2017–18	2nd	16/18	34	9	5	20	25	54	32	1/64 finals		Relegated
2018–19	3rd "B"	1/10	27	18	7	2	48	17	61	1/32 finals		Promoted won championship game
2019–20	2nd	13/16	30	7	6	17	35	57	27	1/16 finals		
2020–21	2nd	15/16	30	6	6	18	23	50	24			
2021–22	2nd	16/16	20	4	1	15	16	43	13			unfinished
2022–23	2nd	8/16	14	1	4	9	11	31	7			
2023–24	2nd	18/20	28	6	7	15	20	48	25			

== Honours ==
- Ukrainian Second League
  - Winners (1): 2018–19
  - Runners-up (2): 1999–2000 (Group C), 2009–10 (Group B)
- Ukrainian Championship among teams of physical culture
  - Winners (1): 1988
- Poltava Oblast Cup
  - Winners (1): 2004
- Poltava Oblast Champions
  - Winners (3): 1962, 2004, 2005
