= Professional Football League of Ukraine =

Ukraine professional soccer league

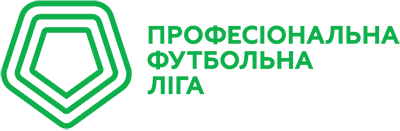
- Founded: 26 May 1996; 30 years ago
- Country: Ukraine
- Confederation: UEFA
- Divisions: First League (2nd tier); Second League (3rd tier)
- Number of clubs: 39
- Level on pyramid: 2–3
- Promotion to: Ukrainian Premier League (UPL)
- Relegation to: Ukrainian Association of Amateur Football (AAFU)
- Current champions: Epitsentr Kamianets-Podilskyi (2024–25)
- Website: pfl.ua

Association of Football Clubs "Professional Football League of Ukraine"
- Професіональна футбольна ліга України
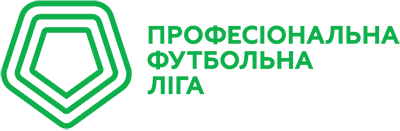
- Abbreviation: PFL
- Successor: Ukrainian Premier League (2008, partially)
- Formation: 26 May 1996; 30 years ago
- Founder: Ukrainian professional football clubs
- Founded at: Kyiv, Ukraine
- Type: non-profit (Note: paragraph 133.4 of Article 133 of the Ukrainian Tax Codex) sport organization
- Registration no.: 24089944 (EDRPOU)
- Legal status: national
- Purpose: Development of national football through the development of its own clubs
- Headquarters: House of Football
- Location: Kyiv, Ukraine
- Region served: Ukraine
- Services: organization of football competitions
- Members: 33 clubs (out of 30 cities) (2017)
- Official language: Ukrainian
- President: Oleksandr Kadenko
- Honored President: Ravil Safiullin
- Sport Director: Oleh Holubev
- Board of directors: PFL Administration
- Main organ: PFL Conference (between conferences – Central Council and Council of leagues)
- Subsidiaries: PFL Disciplinary Committee
- Secessions: Ukrainian Premier League
- Affiliations: Ukrainian Association of Football (Football Federation of Ukraine)
- Website: Official website

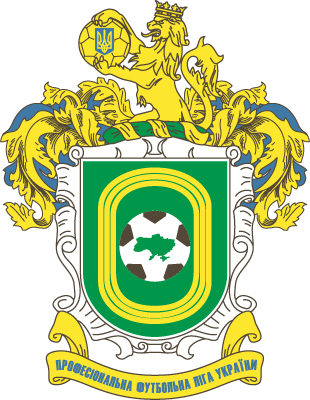
Old logo (1996–2017)

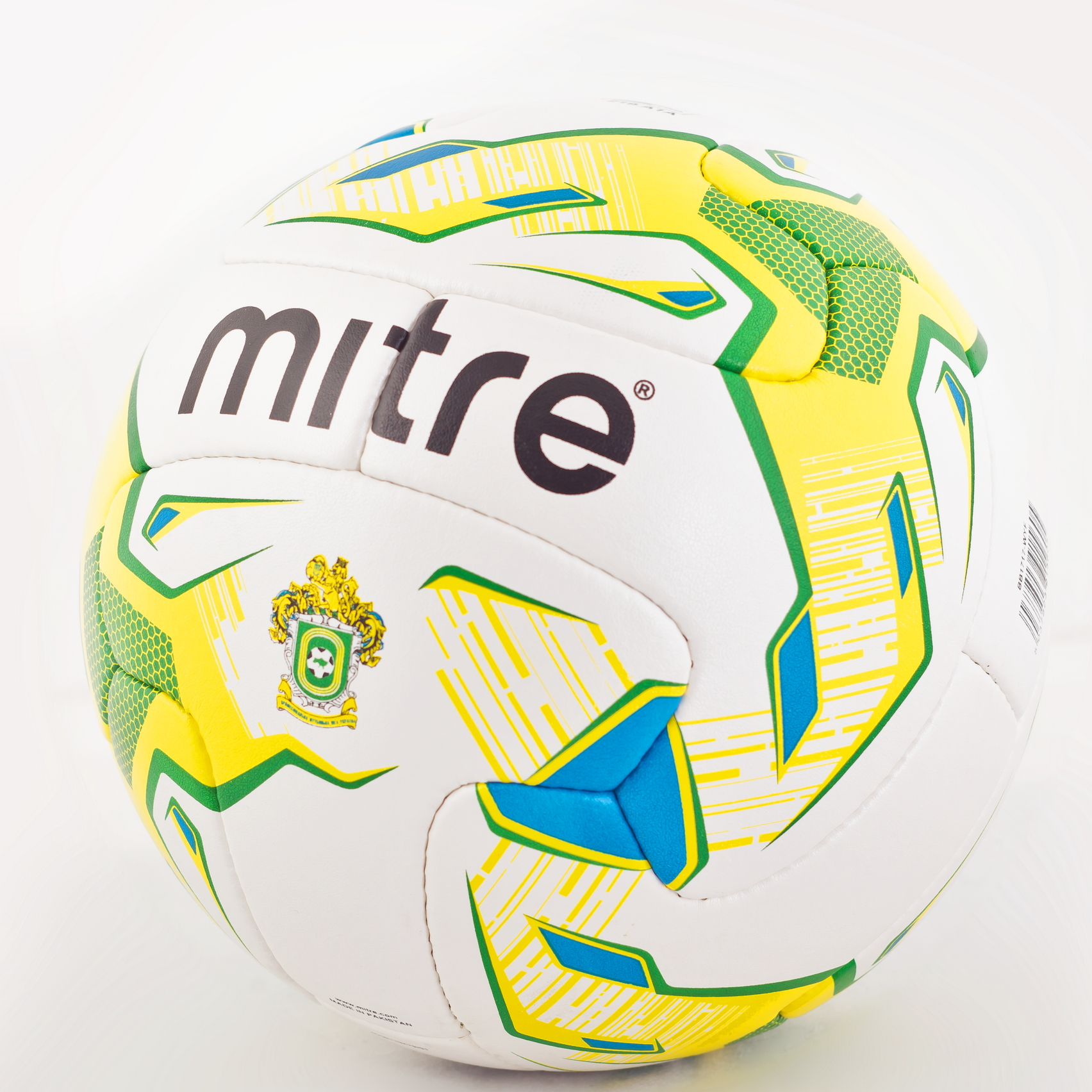
The Mitre ball with PFL logo

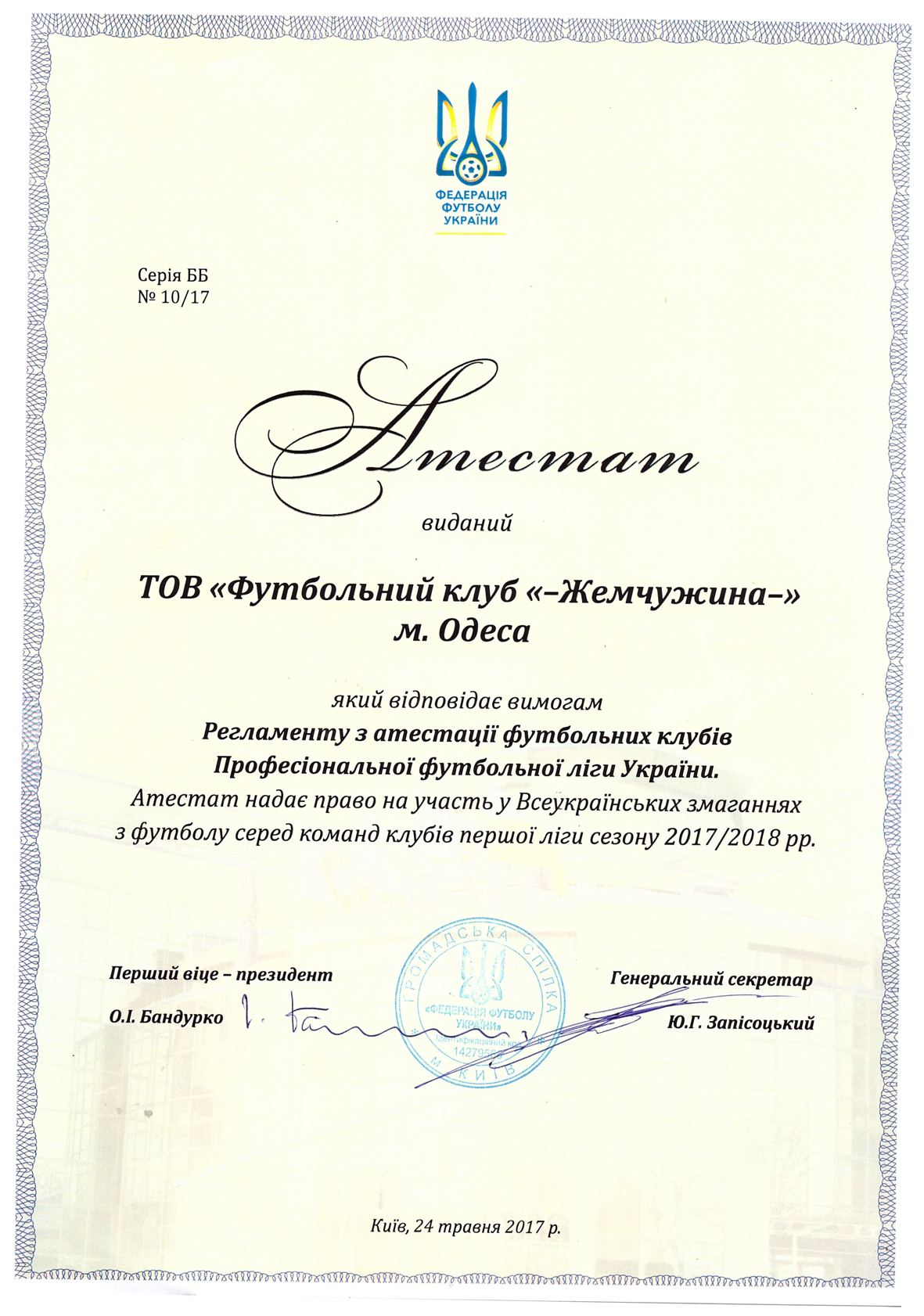
The Ukrainian Association of Football Certificate of Attestation for a club in 2017

The Professional Football League of Ukraine (Ukrainian: Професіональна футбольна ліга України, romanized: Profesionalna futbolna liha Ukrayiny; also known as PFL) is a non-profit sports association of professional football (sports) clubs, also known as the Association of Football Clubs "Professional Football League of Ukraine". It is a collective member of the Ukrainian Association of Football. The association members are created and act according to their statutory goals and objectives.

Created in 1996 as a representative of all professional clubs in Ukraine, the association served as the sole organization of professional football in Ukraine. Starting in 2008, the association's top clubs formed a separate organization, the Ukrainian Premier League, with the PFL representing only professional clubs of lower leagues (second and third tiers). Since then, there have been two associations that organize professional football competitions in the country.

The League organizes the football competition for football clubs in the second and third levels of the Ukrainian football league system, known as Persha Liha and Druha Liha, respectively. It enforces the laws and regulations and ensures that the competitions are organized under the concept of "Fair play".

== History ==
Discussions about the creation of the league had been taking place for several years. There existed a Council of Top League headed by the president of FC Dynamo Kyiv Viktor Bezverkhyi, later there was created an orgcommittee in preparation to create PFL and headed by the FFU president Viktor Bannikov. However the issue on organization of the league was being postponed until it was taken over by a renewed council of football clubs' presidents headed by the new president of Dynamo Hryhoriy Surkis.

The council of presidents, along with the FFU experts, had prepared a great collection of documents with a draft of the PFL statute, a structure of leagues, and a competition calendar. In span of preparatory work those documents were available to get familiar by people of football from all Ukraine. In the beginning of May at a constituent assembly arrived representatives of 53 out of 77 professional clubs at that time, who unanimously voted for creation of the Association of football clubs "Professional Football League". The league's constituent assembly elected the president of PFL Hryhoriy Surkis (Dynamo Kyiv), first vice-president was Dmytro Zlobenko (CSKA-Borysfen), other vice-presidents became Anatoliy Revutskyi (Prykarpattia, TL), Viktor Novykov (Naftovyk Okhtyrka, 1L), Ivan Fedorets, (Desna Chernihiv, 2L). The PFL council consisted of 17 members (Top League – 9, First League – 4, Second League – 4).

Besides the FFU and football clubs, the creation of PFL was also supported by the Ministry of Youth and Sports, which was headed by Valeriy Borzov. Coaches also were delighted with this event. Particularly, Leonid Buryak, who was coaching Chornomorets, said that the creation of PFL is a "life ring" for domestic football.

The PFL was established on May 26, 1996, during the Conference of non-amateur clubs (teams) of Ukraine. The first president of that organization became Hryhoriy Surkis. On July 17, the organization was contracted by FFU for the organization of all competitions among the non-amateur clubs in the country. In August 2000, Hryhoriy Surkis was elected the president of Football Federation of Ukraine, and, on December 22, the newly elected president of PFL became the vice-president of FC Shakhtar Donetsk, Ravil Safiullin. He was later reelected for a second term. In the summer of 2008, the Supreme League was reformed into a self-governing organization that protects the interests of the elite clubs of Ukraine. That left the PFL to govern only the First and the Second Divisions. The PFL itself was also reformed, creating the Councils of each Division in the League.

=== Reforms ===
Following the 2013–14 season, the league administration was reorganized. The league is governed by the "PFL leagues council" (Ukrainian: Рада ліг ПФЛ, romanized: Rada lih PFL) replacing the "PFL Central Council". The league's council meets once every quarter, which is about four times a year.

In 2017, the FFU Executive Committee announced a wide-scale reform of Ukrainian football. On 2 October 2017, the PFL administration presented its draft of the reform. It was adopted as the league's development plan, the 2016-2020 Action Plan. In 2019, Select Sport became the official technical sponsor of the league, providing its football balls Select Brilliant Super. It replaced the previous balls Mitre Delta V12S. Following the dismissal of Serhiy Makarov, the reforms of the Professional Football League were stalled halfway through.

In the summer of 2023, PFL presented a new football for the 2023–24 season from Select Sport and extended its contract with the company for another four years.

== Government and governing bodies ==
Every year, before the beginning of every season, the Professional Football League gathers the "PFL Conference" that represents all members and approves the composition of the leagues and the season's calendar.

Any disciplinary actions are being addressed through the PFL Disciplinary Committee (PFL DK) as a primary institution, before it is reviewed by the FFU Control and Disciplinary Committee (FFU KDK).

Other important administrative and executive bodies of the league include the PFL Anti-Crisis Council and the PFL Administration.

=== Presidents ===
- Hryhoriy Surkis, 26 May 1996 – 22 December 2000
- Ravil Safiullin, 22 December 2000 – 16 December 2008
- Svyatoslav Syrota, 16 December 2008 – 17 December 2009
- Mykola Lavrenko (acting), 17 December 2009 – 4 March 2010, a chairman of the First League
- Miletiy Balchos, 4 March 2010 – 27 June 2014
- Serhiy Makarov, 27 June 2014 – 6 August 2020
- Oleksandr Kadenko, 29 September 2020 – present (acting 6 August 2020 – 29 September 2020)

=== Competitions ===
- Persha Liha (Ukrainian First League)
- Druha Liha (Ukrainian Second League)

== Individual awards ==
Along with Sport Arena, the PFL awards the best players, squad, manager, young player, and goal of the round for each round of the playing season. In addition, starting in 2018, the PFL awards player of the month until 2022 with UA-Football, and after Ukrfootball. Oleksandr Akymenko became the first player to be given the award, while Oleksandr Mishurenko became the first player to be given the award more than once.
