= 2020–21 Ukrainian Second League =

Ukrainian Second League
- Season: 2020–21
- Dates: 6 September 2020 – 16 June 2021
- Champions: Metal Kharkiv
- Promoted: Metal Kharkiv (Group B); Podillya Khmelnytskyi (Group A); Kryvbas Kryvyi Rih (Group B); Uzhhorod (Group A)
- Matches: 134
- Goals: 365 (2.72 per match)
- Top goalscorer: 9 – Yevhen Chepurnenko (Dinaz)
- Biggest home win: Metal 6–0 Real Pharma (11 September 2020)
- Biggest away win: Dnipro 0–4 Metal (5 September 2020), Karpaty L. 0–4 Volyn-2 (23 October 2020)
- Highest scoring: Kryvbas 6–1 Nikopol (11 September)
- Longest winning run: 7 – Metal
- Longest unbeaten run: 19 – Metal
- Longest winless run: 8 – Mykolaiv-2
- Longest losing run: 7 – Nyva
- Highest attendance: 1,100 – Karpaty L. – Rubikon (3 October 2020)
- Lowest attendance: 0 – 61 games
- Total attendance: 13910
- Average attendance: 290
- All statistics correct as of 4 February 2021.

The 2020–21 Ukrainian Second League was the 30th since its establishment. The football competitions in the Second League kicked off on 6 September 2020, about half a month after promotion/relegation playoffs. The planned 12th week of the season that accomplished the first half took place on 21 November 2020, yet the extra week was provided for few games that were forced to be rescheduled before teams retired for the winter intermission. The second half is scheduled to restart on 19 March 2021.

== Summary ==
In this season, the bottom two teams of the First League were relegated to the Second League. The top two teams from each group of the Second League gained promotion to the First League for the next season.

== Teams ==
=== Promoted teams ===
Seven teams have been promoted from the 2019–20 Ukrainian Football Amateur League:

- Epitsentr Dunaivtsi – 2nd place of Group 1 (debut)
- Karpaty Halych – 4th place of Group 1 (debut)
- FC Chernihiv – 3rd place of Group 2 (debut)
- Rubikon Kyiv – 6th place of Group 2 (debut)
- Dnipro Cherkasy – 9th place of Group 2 (returning after 12 seasons, last played season in 2008–09)
- Yarud Mariupol – 4th place of Group 3 (debut)
- Peremoha Dnipro – 7th place of Group 3 (debut, the club was admitted despite disciplinary sanctions from the UAF about the last season "beef")

One reserve and one other team were added also without participation in the Ukrainian Football Amateur League:

- Volyn-2 Lutsk – (debut, based on Volyn U-19 Lutsk)
- Metal Kharkiv – (debut)

=== Relegated teams ===
Four teams have been relegated:

- Karpaty Lviv – 12th place in the 2019–20 Ukrainian Premier League (debut, the club was admitted despite being expelled from the Premier League for no show)
  - Note: another club with the same name (Karpaty Lviv) was admitted to the 2020–21 Ukrainian Football Amateur League (lower tier)
- Balkany Zoria – 14th place in the 2019–20 Ukrainian First League (returning after 3 seasons, relegated on own initiative)
- Metalurh Zaporizhya – 15th place in the 2019–20 Ukrainian First League (returning after a season, lost relegation play-off)
- Cherkashchyna Cherkasy – 16th place in the 2019–20 Ukrainian First League (returning after a season, lost relegation play-off)

=== Withdrawn teams ===
- Avanhard-2 Kramatorsk – withdrawn before the season
- Chornomorets-2 Odesa – withdrawn before the season
- FC Kalush, after failing to arrive for the game against Epitsentr, it was confirmed that the club will not host the game against Karpaty Lviv. The club withdrew even after paying their season's dues without playing a single game.
- Cherkashchyna Cherkasy – withdrawn during the winter break. Before the break the club played 10 games winning 5 of them, tying 4 and losing one game with goal difference having 14 scored and 7 allowed. Soon after the announcement, the newly elected President of PFL, Oleksandr Kadenko denied fact of withdrawal as no official request has been made. On 3 March 2021 the club has sent a letter confirming that it is leaving the competitions.

=== Merged and renamed teams ===
- FC Kryvbas Kryvyi Rih – it was restructured from FC Hirnyk Kryvyi Rih. On 29 July 2020 the president of Hirnyk Kostiantyn Karamanits confirmed that his team is being renamed into Kryvbas-2020 next season. Later it changed to Kryvbas Kryvyi Rih. The club's rebranding was triggered on petition of President of Ukraine Volodymyr Zelenskyy, who is a native of Kryvyi Rih.
- Earlier in 2020, FC Chernihiv merged with Avanhard Koriukivka as Chernihiv-Avanhard and kept its original team Chernihiv-YSB during the 2019–20 Ukrainian Football Amateur League. During the season Avanhard Koriukivka had more points and even played in post season play-offs. In August 2020 to the Second League instead of the merged club was admitted FC Chernihiv only. There is no real procedure on promotion from the amateur championship and clubs are being selected regardless of final standings such as FC Dnipro Cherkasy or FC Peremoha Dnipro.
- SC Tavriya Simferopol merged with FC Tavriya Novotroitske.

=== Location map ===
The following map displays the location of teams. Group A teams marked in red. Group B teams marked in green.

Home venues of teams in the 2020–21 Ukrainian Second League. SC Tavriya is forced to play its home games outside of Crimea (Autonomous Republic of Crimea).

== Stadiums ==
Group A
Team	Stadium (Note: Minimum capacity of stadium for the Second League is 500 spectators.)	Position in 2019–20
Karpaty Lviv	Ukraina Stadium	PL
Dinaz Vyshhorod	Dinaz Stadium; Stadion im.Brukvenka; Koncha-Zaspa training	4th
Podillia Khmelnytskyi	Sport Complex Podillia; Stadion Rukh	6th
Chaika	Stadion im.Brukvenka; Arsenal Arena	7th
Bukovyna Chernivtsi	Bukovyna Stadium; Stadion Olimpiya	8th
Nyva Vinnytsia	Tsentralnyi Miskyi Stadion; Stadion Khimik	9th
FC Uzhhorod	Avanhard Stadium	10th
Obolon-2 Bucha	Yuvileinyi Stadium	11th
FC Chernihiv	Chernihiv Arena; Livyi Bereh Arena; Stadion Champion	Am
Epitsentr Dunaivtsi	Kolos Stadium; Skif Stadium; Yunist Stadium	Am
Karpaty Halych	Enerhetyk Stadium	Am
Rubikon Kyiv	Arsenal Arena	Am
Volyn-2 Lutsk	Pidshypnyk Stadium	—

Group B
Team	Stadium	Position in 2019–20
Balkany Zoria	Stadion im.B.Tropantsia (Note: On 27 October 2020 Balkany announced that it is moving to the Chornomorets base in the "Sauvignon" neighborhood of Odesa.); Stadion Liustdorf; Stadion im.Liubchika	1L
Cherkashchyna Cherkasy (Note: Cherkashchyna Cherkasy withdrew midseason)	Zorya Stadium	1L
Metalurh Zaporizhya	Slavutych-Arena	1L
Kryvbas Kryvyi Rih	Hirnyk Stadium (Note: Last season it carried the name of Shakhta Oktiabrska Stadium)	4th
Enerhiya Nova Kakhovka	Enerhiya Stadium	5th
FC Nikopol	Elektrometalurh Stadium	6th
MFC Mykolaiv-2	Park Peremohy Stadium	7th
Tavriya Simferopol	Marianivskyi Stadium (Note: Tavriya Simferopol moved to play their home matches in Marianivka, Kakhovka Raion after merging with Tavriya Novotroitske. All matches will be played in Kherson Oblast of Ukraine due to the Annexation of Crimea by the Russian Federation)	8th
Real Pharma Odesa	Stadion Ivan	9th
Dnipro Cherkasy	Tsentralnyi Stadion	Am
Peremoha Dnipro	Stadion Olimpiyski Rezervy	Am
Yarud Mariupol	Zakhidnyi Stadium	Am
Metal Kharkiv	Soniachny Stadium	—

== Managers ==
Club	Head coach	Replaced coach
Balkany Zoria	(Ukraine) Denys Kolchin	(Ukraine) Andriy Parkhomenko
Bukovyna Chernivtsi	(Ukraine) Yevhen Kovalenko	(Ukraine) Stepan Makoviychuk
Chaika Petropavlivska Borshchahivka	(Ukraine) Viacheslav Bohodyelov (interim)	(Ukraine) Taras Ilnytskyi (Ukraine) Oleksandr Protchenko (interim) (Ukraine) Oleksandr Shcherbakov
Cherkashchyna Cherkasy	Vacant	(Ukraine) Anatoliy Bezsmertnyi
FC Chernihiv	(Ukraine) Valeriy Chornyi (interim)	(Ukraine) Vadym Postovoy
Dinaz Vyshhorod	(Ukraine) Volodymyr Bondarenko	
Dnipro Cherkasy	(Ukraine) Ihor Stolovytskyi	
Enerhiya Nova Kakhovka	(Ukraine) Eduard Khavrov	(Ukraine) Oleh Fedorchuk
Epitsentr Dunaivtsi	(Ukraine) Ihor Badlo	
Kryvbas Kryvyi Rih	(Ukraine) Hennadiy Prykhodko	
FC Kalush	(Ukraine) Stepan Matviyiv	
Karpaty Halych	(Ukraine) Roman Hnativ	
Karpaty Lviv	(Ukraine) Lyubomyr Vovchuk	
Metal Kharkiv	(Ukraine) Oleksandr Kucher	
Metalurh Zaporizhya	(Ukraine) Volodymyr Mykytyn	
MFC Mykolaiv-2	(Ukraine) Anatoliy Didenko	(Ukraine) Mykola Popelyshko
FC Nikopol	(Ukraine) Oleksandr Poklonskyi	(Ukraine) Hryhoriy Varzhelenko (Ukraine) Yevhen Yarovenko (Ukraine) Serhiy Vorobei
Nyva Vinnytsia	(Ukraine) Volodymyr Tsytkin	(Ukraine) Oleh Shumovytskyi
Obolon-2 Bucha	(Ukraine) Andriy Kornyev (interim)	(Ukraine) Oleksandr Antonenko
Peremoha Dnipro	(Ukraine) Serhiy Vorobei	(Ukraine) Yevhen Yarovenko (Ukraine) Pavlo Taran (Ukraine) Dmytro Ryabyi (Note: In the PFL protocols for Peremoha for the 2020–21 Ukrainian Second League season spring half as the club's manager is shown someone Viktor Kyrtysh)
Podillya Khmelnytskyi	(Ukraine) Vitaliy Kostyshyn	
Real Pharma Odesa	(Ukraine) Artem Riazantsev	
Rubikon Kyiv	(Ukraine) Serhiy Litovchenko	(Ukraine) Viktor Kuriata
Tavriya Simferopol	(Ukraine) Serhiy Puchkov	(Ukraine) Serhiy Shevchenko (Ukraine) Oleh Fedorchuk (Ukraine) Yuriy Chumak (Interim)
FC Uzhhorod	(Ukraine) Volodymyr Vasiutyk	
Volyn-2 Lutsk	(Ukraine) Albert Shakhov	
Yarud Mariupol	(Ukraine) Oleh Krasnopyorov	(Ukraine) Volodymyr Kilikevych

=== Managerial changes ===
Team	Outgoing head coach	Manner of departure	Date of vacancy	Table	Incoming head coach	Date of appointment	Table
FC Uzhhorod	(Ukraine) Mykhailo Ivanytsia	Resigned	18 June 2020	Pre-season	(Ukraine) Volodymyr Vasiutyk	23 July 2020	Pre-season
Real Pharma Odesa	(Ukraine) Oleksandr Spitsyn	Unknown	28 June 2020	Pre-season	(Ukraine) Artem Riazantsev	28 June 2020	Pre-season
Metal Kharkiv	New club			Pre-season	(Ukraine) Oleksandr Kucher	25 July 2020	Pre-season
Karpaty Lviv	(Ukraine) Roman Sanzhar	Mutual agreement	29 July 2020	Pre-season	(Ukraine) Lyubomyr Vovchuk	24 August 2020	Pre-season
Peremoha Dnipro	(Ukraine) Yevhen Fetisov	Undisclosed	5 August 2020	Pre-season	(Ukraine) Evgeny Yarovenko	5 August 2020	Pre-season
Karpaty Halych	(Ukraine) Petro Rusak	Undisclosed	24 August 2020	Pre-season	(Ukraine) Roman Hnativ	24 August 2020	Pre-season
Metalurh Zaporizhya	(Ukraine) Oleksiy Hodin (interim)	End of interim	27 August 2020	Pre-season	(Ukraine) Volodymyr Mykytyn	27 August 2020	Pre-season
Volyn-2 Lutsk	New club			Pre-season	(Ukraine) Albert Shakhov	3 September 2020	Pre-season
FC Cherkashchyna	(Ukraine) Oleksandr Kyrylyuk	Undisclosed	6 September 2020	Pre-season	(Ukraine) Anatoliy Bezsmertnyi	6 September 2020	Pre-season
Rubikon Kyiv	(Ukraine) Viktor Kuriata	Undisclosed		9th	(Ukraine) Serhiy Litovchenko	8 October 2020	9th
Chaika Petropavlivska Borshchahivka	(Ukraine) Taras Ilnytskyi	Resigned	13 October 2020	5th	(Ukraine) Oleksandr Protchenko (interim)	10 October 2020	5th
Chaika Petropavlivska Borshchahivka	(Ukraine) Oleksandr Protchenko (interim)	End of interim	21 October 2020	5th	(Ukraine) Oleksandr Shcherbakov	21 October 2020	5th
Peremoha Dnipro	(Ukraine) Evgeny Yarovenko	Fired	19 November 2020	6th	(Ukraine) Pavlo Taran	24 November 2020	6th
Balkany Zoria	(Ukraine) Andriy Parkhomenko	Resigned	20 November 2020	10th	(Ukraine) Denys Kolchin	1 December 2020	10th
FC Nikopol	(Ukraine) Hryhoriy Varzhelenko	Change of duties	20 November 2020	11th	(Ukraine) Evgeny Yarovenko	1 December 2020	11th
Enerhiya Nova Kakhovka	(Ukraine) Oleh Fedorchuk	Moved to Tavriya	3 January 2021	7th	(Ukraine) Eduard Khavrov	10 January 2021	7th
Tavriya Simferopol	(Ukraine) Serhiy Shevchenko	Sacked	3 January 2021	2nd	(Ukraine) Oleh Fedorchuk	3 January 2021	2nd
Nyva Vinnytsia	(Ukraine) Oleh Shumovytskyi	undisclosed	23 January 2021	12th	(Ukraine) Volodymyr Tsytkin	23 January 2021	12th
Yarud Mariupol	(Ukraine) Volodymyr Kilikevych	undisclosed	25 January 2021	12th	(Ukraine) Oleh Krasnopyorov	25 January 2021	12th
MFC Mykolaiv-2	(Ukraine) Mykola Popelyshko	undisclosed	29 January 2021	13th	(Ukraine) Anatoliy Didenko	29 January 2021	13th
Chaika Petropavlivska Borshchahivka	(Ukraine) Oleksandr Shcherbakov	Resigned, family matters	1 February 2021	6th	(Ukraine) Viacheslav Bohodyelov (interim)	1 February 2021	6th
Peremoha Dnipro	(Ukraine) Pavlo Taran	Unknown	February 2021	6th	(Ukraine) Dmytro Ryabyi	8 February 2021	6th
Bukovyna Chernivtsi	(Ukraine) Stepan Makoviychuk	Mutual agreement	5 February 2021	7th	(Ukraine) Yevhen Kovalenko	28 February 2021	7th
FC Nikopol	(Ukraine) Evgeny Yarovenko	Fired	7 February 2021	11th	(Ukraine) Serhiy Vorobei	23 February 2021	11th
FC Cherkashchyna	(Ukraine) Anatoliy Bezsmertnyi	Left the club	23 February 2021	5th	Withdrew		
Tavriya Simferopol	(Ukraine) Oleh Fedorchuk	Fired	21 April 2021	4th	(Ukraine) Yuriy Chumak (interim)	26 April 2021	4th
FC Chernihiv	(Ukraine) Vadym Postovoy	Fired	21 April 2021	10th	(Ukraine) Valeriy Chornyi (interim)	21 April 2021	10th
Obolon-2 Bucha	(Ukraine) Oleksandr Antonenko	Assigned to Obolon Kyiv	12 May 2021	10th	(Ukraine) Andriy Kornyev (interim)	12 May 2021	10th
Tavriya Simferopol	(Ukraine) Yuriy Chumak (Interim)	Interim term ended	10 June 2021	4th	(Ukraine) Serhiy Puchkov	10 June 2021	4th
Peremoha Dnipro	(Ukraine) Dmytro Ryabyi	Resigned	11 June 2021	9th	(Ukraine) Serhiy Vorobei	11 June 2021	9th
FC Nikopol	(Ukraine) Serhiy Vorobei	Moved to Peremoha	11 June 2021	11th	(Ukraine) Oleksandr Poklonskyi	11 June 2021	11th

== Group A ==
Pos	Team	Pld	W	D	L	GF	GA	GD	Pts	Promotion, qualification or relegation
1	Podillya Khmelnytskyi (P, C)	24	17	6	1	46	13	+33	57	Promotion to Ukrainian First League
2	FC Uzhhorod (P)	24	17	4	3	50	23	+27	55	Promotion to Ukrainian First League
3	Dinaz Vyshhorod	24	15	6	3	52	19	+33	51	
4	Epitsentr Dunaivtsi	24	14	6	4	36	15	+21	48	
5	Karpaty Halych	24	14	4	6	42	25	+17	46	
6	Nyva Vinnytsia	24	10	3	11	38	38	0	33	
7	Bukovyna Chernivtsi	24	9	5	10	27	31	−4	32	
8	Chaika Petropavlivska Borshchahivka	24	6	7	11	26	32	−6	25	
9	Obolon-2 Bucha	24	6	6	12	21	39	−18	24	Withdrew after season
10	FC Chernihiv	24	5	6	13	19	33	−14	21	
11	Rubikon Kyiv	24	4	5	15	17	44	−27	17	
12	Volyn-2 Lutsk	24	3	4	17	16	43	−27	13 (Note: Head-to-head points: Volyn-2 4, Karpaty 1)	Withdrew after season
13	Karpaty Lviv	24	3	4	17	20	55	−35	13	Withdrew after season
-	FC Kalush	0	-	-	-	-	-	—	0	Withdrew after Round 1 before their first game

Updated to match(es) played on 11 June 2021. Source: PFL.ua
Rules for classification: 1) Points; 2) Head-to-head points; 3) Head-to-head goal difference; 4) Head-to-head goals scored; 5) Goal difference in all games; 6) Goals scored in all games (Note: calculation by criteria indicated in rules 2, 3, 4 is conducted with consideration of all teams that have an equal number of tournament points at the moment of calculation and not only among those which after preliminary criteria have appeared more successful).
(C) Champions; (P) Promoted

=== Results ===
Home \ Away	BUK	CPB	CHE	DIN	EPD	KAH	KAR	NVV	OB2	POD	RUB	UZH	VO2
Bukovyna Chernivtsi		0–0	2–2	1–2	0–1	0–3	1–0	1–0	3–1	0–0	0–0 (Note: The game Bukovyna – Rubikon was postponed due to COVID-19 outbreak.)	0–1	1–0
Chaika	0–1		2–0	0–1	1–1	0–3	1–1	3–1	1–2	0–0	1–2	1–2	2–1
FC Chernihiv	2–1	2–0		1–2 (Note: The game Chernihiv – Dinaz was postponed due to COVID-19 outbreak.)	0–1	1–3	0–1	2–2	1–1	0–3	0–1	1–2	1–0
Dinaz Vyshhorod	5–1	2–0	0–0		1–2	3–2	3–0	5–1	3–0	1–1	2–0	1–1	3–0
Epitsentr Dunaivtsi	2–2 (Note: The game Epitsentr – Bukovyna was postponed due to COVID-19 outbreak.)	1–1	2–0 (Note: The game Epitsentr – Chernihiv was postponed due to COVID-19 outbreak. Match played 25 May.)	2–1		2–0	2–0	2–0	1–0	0–3	3–0	0–0	3–0
Karpaty Halych	3–1	2–2	2–1	1–1	1–0		3–1	4–2	1–0	1–2	0–0	0–3	2–0
Karpaty Lviv	0–3	1–1	4–1	0–3	0–3	1–3		1–2	2–2	0–3	1–2	0–5	0–4
Nyva Vinnytsia	1–2	3–1	2–0	0–0	1–0	1–1	4–2		1–3	1–2	2–1	4–1	3–0
Obolon-2 Bucha	0–1	0–2 (Note: The game Obolon-2 – Chaika was postponed due to COVID-19 outbreak.)	0–0 (Note: The game Obolon-2 – Chernihiv was postponed due to COVID-19 outbreak.)	0–5	0–3	2–0	1–0 (Note: The game Obolon-2 – Karpaty L. was postponed due to COVID-19 outbreak.)	0–2		0–0	2–2	0–1	2–0
Podillya Khmelnytskyi	3–1	1–0	1–0	3–3	0–0 (Note: The game Podillia – Epitsentr was postponed due to COVID-19 outbreak.)	2–0	4–1	2–0	4–0		2–0	2–1	1–0
Rubikon Kyiv	1–3	1–3	0–2	0–1	1–1	0–2	0–3	0–3	1–2	1–4		1–4 (Note: The game Rubikon – Uzhhorod was postponed due to COVID-19 outbreak.)	1–0
FC Uzhhorod	3–2	3–0	1–1	2–1	2–0 (Note: The game Uzhhorod – Epitsentr was postponed due to COVID-19 outbreak.)	0–3	3–0	2–1	4–2	3–1	2–1		3–0
Volyn-2 Lutsk	1–0	1–4	0–1	1–3	1–4	0–2	1–1	3–1	1–1	0–2	1–1	1–1	

Updated to match(es) played on 11 June 2021. Source: pfl.ua (in Ukrainian)
Legend: Blue = home team win; Yellow = draw; Red = away team win.
Notes:

=== Top goalscorers ===
As of 10 June 2021

Rank	Scorer	Team	Goals (Pen.)
1	(Ukraine) Adrian Pukanych	FC Uzhhorod	13
2	(Ukraine) Vasyl Palahnyuk	Bukovyna Chernivtsi	11 (1)
3	(Ukraine) Roman Lebed	Karpaty Halych	10 (5)

== Group B ==
Pos	Team	Pld	W	D	L	GF	GA	GD	Pts	Promotion, qualification or relegation
1	Metal Kharkiv (C, P)	22	20	2	0	65	5	+60	62	Promotion to Ukrainian First League
2	Kryvbas Kryvyi Rih (P)	22	15	5	2	53	15	+38	50	Promotion to Ukrainian First League
3	Metalurh Zaporizhya	22	13	4	5	42	20	+22	43	
4	Tavriya Simferopol	22	12	6	4	41	22	+19	42	
5	Enerhiya Nova Kakhovka	22	9	3	10	34	35	−1	30	
6	Yarud Mariupol	22	8	4	10	27	39	−12	28	
7	Dnipro Cherkasy	22	7	6	9	17	34	−17	27	
8	Balkany Zoria	22	6	5	11	20	28	−8	23 (Note: Head-to-head points: Balkany 4, Peremoha 1)	
9	Peremoha Dnipro	22	5	8	9	21	29	−8	23	
10	Real Pharma Odesa	22	5	3	14	13	40	−27	18	
11	FC Nikopol	22	3	5	14	18	46	−28	14	
12	MFC Mykolaiv-2	22	1	5	16	13	51	−38	8	Withdrew after season
-	Cherkashchyna Cherkasy	0	0	0	0	0	0	0	0	Withdrawn and record annulled

Updated to match(es) played on 11 June 2021. Source: PFL.ua
Rules for classification: 1) Points; 2) Head-to-head points; 3) Head-to-head goal difference; 4) Head-to-head goals scored; 5) Goal difference in all games; 6) Goals scored in all games (Note: calculation by criteria indicated in rules 2, 3, 4 is conducted with consideration of all teams that have an equal number of tournament points at the moment of calculation and not only among those which after preliminary criteria have appeared more successful).
(C) Champions; (P) Promoted

=== Results ===
Home \ Away	BAZ	MEZ	~~CHE~~ (Note: Cherkashchyna Cherkasy withdrew midseason. Results displayed involving the team were annulled.)	ENK	KRY	MK2	NIK	RPO	TAV	DNI	PER	YAR	MET
Balkany Zoria		0–2		1–0	1–1	4–0	0–0	3–0	0–2	0–1 (Note: The game Balkany – Dnipro was postponed due to COVID-19 outbreak.)	2–1	3–1	1–3
Metalurh Zaporizhya	2–0			4–0	2–2	3–0	7–1	3–1	1–4	2–0	0–0	2–1	1–2
~~Cherkashchyna Cherkasy~~ (Note: Cherkashchyna Cherkasy withdrew midseason. Results displayed involving the team were annulled.)	2–1				1–1	2–0	2–0			0–0		1–0 (Note: The game Cherkashchyna – Yarud was postponed due to COVID-19 outbreak.)	
Enerhiya Nova Kakhovka	4–0	1–1	2–2		2–4	3–0	5–2	3–0	0–2	4–0	0–0	1–3	1–3
Kryvbas Kryvyi Rih	1–0	2–0		5–0		1–1	6–1	6–0	5–0	1–0	1–0	5–1 (Note: The game Kryvbas – Yarud was postponed due to COVID-19 outbreak.)	0–0
MFC Mykolaiv-2	1–1	0–1		1–2	0–4		1–1	0–0	0–3	1–2	3–4	0–1	0–2
FC Nikopol	0–1	0–3		3–0	1–2	0–1		0–0	0–2 (Note: The game Nikopol – Tavriya was postponed due to COVID-19 outbreak.)	0–0	1–1	2–4	0–2
Real Pharma Odesa	2–0	2–0	0–2	1–3	0–1	2–1	1–3		0–3	0–0	2–0	1–2	0–2
Tavriya Simferopol	1–0	1–1	2–1	3–1	1–1 (Note: The game Tavriya – Kryvbas was postponed due to COVID-19 outbreak. Scheduled for 4 November, on 2 November 2020 the game was postponed again.)	6–1	2–0	1–0		4–0	1–1 (Note: The game Tavriya – Peremoha was postponed due to COVID-19 outbreak.)	1–1	0–3
Dnipro Cherkasy	2–1	0–1		1–0	1–3	1–0	2–1	0–1	2–2		1–1	1–0	0–4
Peremoha Dnipro	0–0	1–3	1–1	0–1	1–0	3–1	1–2	2–0	1–1	1–1		3–0	0–4
Yarud Mariupol	1–1	0–3		1–3	0–2	1–1	2–0 (Note: The game Yarud – Nikopol was postponed due to COVID-19 outbreak.)	1–0	2–0	2–2	3–0		0–3
Metal Kharkiv	3–1	2–0		0–0	3–0	6–0	3–0	6–0	2–1	5–0	2–0	5–0	

Updated to match(es) played on 11 June 2021. Source: pfl.ua (in Ukrainian)
Legend: Blue = home team win; Yellow = draw; Red = away team win.
Notes:

=== Top goalscorers ===
As of 11 June 2021

Rank	Scorer	Team	Goals (Pen.)
1	(Ukraine) Oleksiy Boyko	Tavriya Simferopol	10 (1)
1	(Ukraine) Eduard Sarapiy	Metalurh Zaporizhya	10 (3)
1	(Ukraine) Kostyantyn Cherniy	Kryvbas Kryvyi Rih	10 (4)

== Championship game ==
According to Article 8.4 of the season's regulations, there is expected to be a championship game. On 8 June 2021 a draw identified hosting club for the game.

16 June 2021	Metal Kharkiv	1 – 0	Podillya Khmelnytskyi	Cherkasy
	Fomin 54'	Report; Overview		Stadium: Cherkasy Arena; Referee: Sofia Prychyna (Lviv Oblast)

== Awards ==
=== Round awards ===
Round	Player			Coach		
Round	Player	Club	Reference	Coach	Club	Reference
Round 1	(Ukraine) Ruslan Fomin	Metal Kharkiv		(Ukraine) Volodymyr Bondarenko	Dinaz Vyshhorod	
Round 2	(Ukraine) Andriy Hryhoryk	Kryvbas Kryvyi Rih		(Ukraine) Oleksandr Antonenko	Obolon-2 Bucha	
Round 3	(Ukraine) Oleh Bereza	Karpaty Lviv		(Ukraine) Ihor Badlo	Epitsentr Dunaivtsi	
Round 4	(Ukraine) Yevhen Chepurnenko	Dinaz Vyshhorod		(Ukraine) Serhiy Shevchenko	Tavriya Simferopol	
Round 5	(Ukraine) Bohdan Mohylnyi	Metalurh Zaporizhya		(Ukraine) Oleh Fedorchuk	Enerhiya Nova Kakhovka	
Round 6	(Israel) Fadi Salback	Podillia Khmelnytskyi		(Ukraine) Oleksandr Kucher	Metal Kharkiv	
Round 7	(Ukraine) Oleksandr Mishurenko	Kryvbas Kryvyi Rih		(Ukraine) Volodymyr Mykytyn	Metalurh Zaporizhya	
Round 8	(Ukraine) Nazar Verbnyi	Karpaty Halych		(Ukraine) Volodymyr Bondarenko	Dinaz Vyshhorod	
Round 9	(Ukraine) Bohdan Kozak	Karpaty Halych		(Ukraine) Roman Hnativ	Karpaty Halych	
Round 10	(Ukraine) Yaroslav Deda	Karpaty Halych		(Ukraine) Evgeny Yarovenko	Peremoha Dnipro	
Round 11	(Ukraine) Ievhen Kostiuk	Nyva Vinnytsia		(Ukraine) Vitaliy Kostyshyn	Podillia Khmelnytskyi	
Round 12	(Ukraine) Oleh Lyha	Chaika Petropavlivska Borshchahivka		(Ukraine) Albert Shakhov	Volyn-2 Lutsk	
winter break
Round 13	(Ukraine) Ihor Kirienko	Dinaz Vyshhorod		(Ukraine) Volodymyr Bondarenko	Dinaz Vyshhorod	
Round 14	(Ukraine) Viktor Berko	Kryvbas Kryvyi Rih		(Ukraine) Oleh Krasnopyorov	Yarud Mariupol	
Round 15	(Ukraine) Oleksiy Zbun	Kryvbas Kryvyi Rih		(Ukraine) Volodymyr Tsytkin	Nyva Vinnytsia	
Round 16	(France) Farès Bahlouli	Metal Kharkiv		(Ukraine) Roman Hnativ	Karpaty Halych	
Round 17	(Ukraine) Ruslan Ivashko	Epitsentr Dunaivtsi		(Ukraine) Volodymyr Vasyutyk	FC Uzhhorod	
Round 18	(Ukraine) Kostyantyn Cherniy	Kryvbas Kryvyi Rih		(Ukraine) Volodymyr Tsytkin	Nyva Vinnytsia	
Round 19	(Ukraine) Yaroslav Braslavskyi	Nyva Vinnytsia		(Ukraine) Oleksandr Antonenko	Obolon-2 Bucha	
Round 20	(Ukraine) Vitaliy Mentey	FC Chernihiv		(Ukraine) Hennadiy Prykhodko	Kryvbas Kryvyi Rih	
Round 21	(Ukraine) Serhiy Maiboroda	FC Uzhhorod		(Ukraine) Oleksandr Kucher	Metal Kharkiv	
Round 22	(Ukraine) Adrian Pukanych	FC Uzhhorod		(Ukraine) Volodymyr Vasyutyk	FC Uzhhorod	
Round 23	(Ukraine) Artem Radchenko	Peremoha Dnipro		(Ukraine) Eduard Khavrov	Enerhiya Nova Kakhovka	
Round 24	(Ukraine) Vyacheslav Studenko	Enerhiya Nova Kakhovka		(Ukraine) Vitaliy Kostyshyn	Podillia Khmelnytskyi	
Round 25	(Ukraine) Oleksiy Boyko	Tavriya Simferopol		(Ukraine) Volodymyr Tsytkin	Nyva Vinnytsia	
Round 26	(Ukraine) Valeriy Kaverin	Podillia Khmelnytskyi		(Ukraine) Vitaliy Kostyshyn	Podillia Khmelnytskyi	

== See also ==
- 2020–21 Ukrainian Premier League
- 2020–21 Ukrainian First League
- 2020–21 Ukrainian Football Amateur League
- 2020–21 Ukrainian Cup
