= 2018–19 Ukrainian Second League =

Ukrainian Second League
- Season: 2018–19
- Dates: 21 July 2018 – 25 May 2019 (winter break 11 November 2018 – 31 March 2019); 29 May 2019 – 2 June 2019 (play-offs)
- Champions: Kremin
- Promoted: Mynai (Group A); Cherkashchyna (Group A); Kremin (Group B); Metalurh (Group B)
- Relegated: ~~Myr~~ (withdrew)
- Matches: 270
- Goals: 641 (2.37 per match)
- Top goalscorer: 20 – Kostyantyn Cherniy (Kremin)
- Biggest home win: 6 – Metalurh 6–0 Nikopol (Round 25)
- Biggest away win: 5 – Nikopol 0–5 Krystal (Round 12)
- Highest scoring: 10 – Hirnyk 7–3 Mykolaiv-2 (Round 16)
- Longest winning run: 5 – Krystal (Round 11–15)
- Longest unbeaten run: 11 – Kremin (Round 12–22)
- Longest winless run: 13 – Chaika (Round 2–14)
- Longest losing run: 8 – Nikopol (Round 2–9)
- Highest attendance: 4,500 – Nyva T.–Bukovyna (Round 2)
- Lowest attendance: 0 – first 3 matches involving Cherkashchyna^{(30)} Veres – Cherkashchyna (Round 18)
- All statistics correct as of 25 May 2019.

The 2018–19 Ukrainian Second League was the 28th since its establishment. The competition started on 21 July 2018 with the match between Myr and FC Nikopol.

The competition entered in recess for a winter break which started after the completion of Round 17 on 11 November 2018 and resumed on 31 March 2019. The season competitions were scheduled to be completed on 1 June 2019 (later ending on 25 May 2019 due to reduction of participants) culminating with a two legged play-off for promotion held between the two second place from both groups and the 13th and 14th placed teams from the 2018–19 Ukrainian First League on 29 May and 2 June 2019.

== Format ==
The PFL composition of the league was approved at the PFL Conference on 27 June 2017, yet the final composition with the competition regulations will be approved later by the FFU Executive Committee.

The competition is conducted in a triple round robin format. The PFL reinstated direct promotion and relegation between the Second League and the Ukrainian Amateur Football Championship. Some other administrative changes will be introduced for the season in Second League, such as names on jerseys, the PFL emblem, others. In addition, the FFU approved a list of stadiums for each league.

Each winner of group earns a direct promotion, while each runner will contest additional promotion with 13th/14th places of the First League. In case of the Ukrainian Premier League expansion for the next season, winners and second placed teams will get direct promotion, while in play-off will participate third placed teams.

One team from each group with the worst record will be relegated. Those two teams will be swapped with four teams from the Ukrainian Amateur Football Championship.

== Teams ==
=== Promoted teams ===
The final composition of the league was adopted at the PFL Conference on 27 June 2018. In the midst of the previous season some several amateur teams expressed their intention to play in Druha Liha. The following teams have been admitted from the 2017–18 Ukrainian Football Amateur League:

- Chaika Petropavlivska Borshchahivka – 5th place of Group 2 (debut)
- Hirnyk Kryvyi Rih – 5th place of Group 3 (returning after an absence of five seasons)
- Metalurh Zaporizhya – 4th place of Group 3 (debut, a club with the same name competed last season)
- FC Kalush – 5th place of Group 1 (returning after an absence of thirteen seasons)
- Krystal Kherson – 2nd place of Group 3 (returning after an absence of a season after reorganization)
- FC Mynai – 1st place of Group 1 (debut)

=== Relegated teams ===
There were two teams relegated from the 2017–18 Ukrainian First League:

- Kremin Kremenchuk – 16th place (returning after an absence of a season)
- Cherkaskyi Dnipro – 17th place (returning after an absence of three seasons), later dissolved and reorganized as FC Cherkashchyna-Akademiya Bilozirya

=== Swapped teams ===
- Veres Rivne – 6th place of the 2017–18 Ukrainian Premier League (returning after an absence of two seasons). The club passed attestation and assumed the position in the league instead of FC Lviv and returned to Rivne Oblast.

=== Renamed/reformed teams ===
- FC Cherkaskyi Dnipro was dissolved in July 2018, and reorganized as FC Cherkashchyna-Akademiya Bilozirya based on its academy from Bilozirya assumed the place of Cherkaskyi Dnipro in the Second League instead.
- FC Nyva-V Vinnytsia renamed themselves back to their former name FC Nyva Vinnytsia.

=== Expelled/withdrawn teams ===
- Naftovyk-Ukrnafta Okhtyrka – passed attestation and even was given opportunity to return to the First League, but Okhtyrka city mayor Ihor Alekseyev confirmed in May that the club was dissolved by its main sponsor Ukrnafta. The final decision about the team participation in the season was announced on 11 July 2018, and the season calendar was published without team from Okhtyrka.
- Arsenal-Kyivshchyna Bila Tserkva – failed attestation
- FC Dnipro – the club failed attestation for the season and were approved by the FIFA Disciplinary Committee to be relegated to a lower classification level due to unpaid old debts
- FC Metalurh Zaporizhzhia – prior to attestation, the club merged with FC Spartak-KPU Zaporizhzhia (a team of local university, KPU), but on 6 June 2018, the club failed attestation for the season and the club's administration decided to dissolve the team
- Inhulets-2 Petrove – the main club's administration of Inhulets Petrove decided to dissolve the second team
- Sudnobudivnyk Mykolaiv – failed attestation
- Skala Stryi – passed attestation, but dissolved its senior team protesting the FFU accusations in gambling. On 14 June 2018, there appeared information that the club will merge its academy with FC Volyn Lutsk.

=== Location map ===
The following map displays the location of teams. Group A teams marked in red. Group B teams marked in green.

Home venues of teams in the 2018–19 Ukrainian Second League. SC Tavriya plays the home games outside of Crimea.

=== Stadiums ===
Group A

Team	Stadium	Position in 2017–18
Bukovyna Chernivtsi	Bukovyna Stadium	6th
Chaika^{(1)}	Dinaz Stadium M.K.Brukvenko Central Stadium	Am2, 5th
Cherkashchyna-Akademiya	Zorya Stadium^{(2)}	FL, 17th
FC Kalush	Khimik Stadium	Am1, 5th
FC Mynai	Mynai-Arena	Am1, 1st
Nyva Ternopil	City Stadium	7th
Nyva Vinnytsia	Central City Stadium Sports Complex Nyva	3rd
Podillya Khmelnytskyi	Sport Complex Podillya	9th
Polissya Zhytomyr	Avanhard Stadium^{(3)} Arsenal Stadium	8th
Veres Rivne	Kolos Stadium^{(4)}	PL, 6th

Group B

Team	Stadium	Position in 2017–18
Enerhiya Nova Kakhovka	Enerhiya Stadium	3rd
Hirnyk Kryvyi Rih	Zhovtnevyi Stadium	Am3, 5th
Kremin Kremenchuk	Kremin Stadium	FL, 16th
Krystal Kherson	Krystal Stadium	Am3, 2nd
Metalurh Zaporizhya	Slavutych-Arena	Am3, 4th
MFC Mykolaiv-2	Central City Stadium Park Peremohy Stadium	9th
Myr Hornostayivka	Zatys Stadium	5th
FC Nikopol	Elektrometalurh Stadium	7th
Real Pharma Odesa	Ivan Stadium	6th
Tavriya Simferopol	Mashynobudivnyk Stadium^{(5)}	4th

Notes:

- ^(1) Chaika although located in Petropavlivska Borshchahivka in Kyiv-Sviatoshyn Raion outside the city limits of Kyiv began the competition playing in Lyutizh, Vyshhorod Raion since their usual home ground, Kozak-Arena was not in a prepared state. From Round 9 the club moved their home matches to Makariv due to the heat affecting players playing on the artificial surface at Dinaz Stadium.
- ^(2) Cherkashchyna-Akademiya play their home matches in the Zorya Stadium, located in Bilozirya in Cherkasy Raion near the city of Cherkasy.
- ^(3) Polissya Zhytomyr continue to play their home games in Novohrad-Volynskyi due to the construction of both Central Stadium and Spartak Stadium Following the winter break the club moved its home games to the Kyiv's suburb Shchaslyve.
- ^(4) Due to the unavailability of Avanhard Stadium, Veres Rivne play in Mlyniv.
- ^(5) Tavriya Simferopol continue to play their home matches in Beryslav although they had registered to play at Enerhiya Stadium in Nova Kakhovka. All matches will be played in Kherson Oblast of Ukraine due to the Annexation of Crimea by the Russian Federation

== Managers ==
Club	Head coach	Replaced coach
Bukovyna Chernivtsi	(Ukraine) Vitaliy Kunytsia (interim)	(Ukraine) Viktor Mhlynets
Chaika Petropavlivska Borshchahivka	(Ukraine) Taras Ilnytskyi	(Ukraine) Viacheslav Bohodyelov
Cherkashchyna-Akademiya Bilozirya	(Ukraine) Oleksandr Kyrylyuk	
Enerhiya Nova Kakhovka	(Ukraine) Oleh Fedorchuk	
Hirnyk Kryvyi Rih	(Ukraine) Hennadiy Prykhodko	
FC Kalush	(Ukraine) Andriy Nesteruk (interim)	(Ukraine) Vasyl Malyk
Kremin Kremenchuk	(Ukraine) Ihor Stolovytskyi	
Krystal Kherson	(Ukraine) Andriy Kononenko (interim)	(Ukraine) Oleksandr Ovchynnikov (Ukraine) Serhiy Shevtsov (interim)
Metalurh Zaporizhya	(Ukraine) Oleh Taran	
MFC Mykolaiv-2	(Ukraine) Volodymyr Ponomarenko	(Ukraine) Vyacheslav Mazarati
FC Mynai	(Estonia) Kirill Kurenko	(Ukraine) Ihor Kharkovshchenko
Myr Hornostayivka	(Ukraine) Oleksandr Sapelnyak	
FC Nikopol	(Ukraine) Hryhoriy Varzhelenko	
Nyva Ternopil	(Ukraine) Vasyl Malyk	(Ukraine) Vitaliy Shumskyi (Ukraine) Vadym Bozhenko (interim) (Ukraine) Oleksandr Stakhiv
Nyva Vinnytsia	(Ukraine) Colince Ngaha	(Ukraine) Denys Kolchin
Podillya Khmelnytskyi	(Ukraine) Vitaliy Kostyshyn	
Polissya Zhytomyr	(Ukraine) Anatoliy Bezsmertnyi	(Ukraine) Oleksandr Pryzetko
Real Pharma Odesa	(Ukraine) Andriy Kovalenko	
Tavriya Simferopol	(Ukraine) Serhiy Shevchenko	
Veres Rivne	(Ukraine) Oleh Shandruk	(Ukraine) Volodymyr Homenyuk

=== Managerial changes ===
Team	Outgoing head coach	Manner of departure	Date of vacancy	Table	Incoming head coach	Date of appointment	Table
Metalurh Zaporizhzhia	(Ukraine) Volodymyr Shapovalov	End of contract	7 June 2018	Pre-season	(Ukraine) Oleh Taran	7 June 2018	Pre-season
Veres Rivne	(Ukraine) Andriy Demchenko (interim)	Stayed with FC Lviv	8 June 2018	Pre-season	(Ukraine) Volodymyr Homenyuk	14 June 2018	Pre-season
Kremin Kremenchuk	(Ukraine) Serhiy Yashchenko	Change of position	18 June 2018	Pre-season	(Ukraine) Ihor Stolovytskyi	18 June 2018	Pre-season
Chaika P. Borshchahivka	(Ukraine) Anatoliy Kretov	Sacked	15 July 2018	Pre-season	(Ukraine) Viacheslav Bohodyelov	16 July 2018	Pre-season
Cherkashchyna-Akademiya Bilozirya	Re-organized team (replacing FC Cherkaskyi Dnipro)^{(21)}			Pre-season	(Ukraine) Oleksandr Kyrylyuk	21 July 2018	Pre-season
Veres Rivne	(Ukraine) Volodymyr Homenyuk	Resigns	7 August 2018	9th	(Ukraine) Oleh Shandruk (interim)	7 August 2018	9th
Polissya Zhytomyr	(Ukraine) Oleksandr Pryzetko	Fired	21 August 2018	8th	(Ukraine) Anatoliy Bezsmertnyi	21 August 2018	8th
Krystal Kherson	(Ukraine) Oleksandr Ovchynnikov	Resigned	14 September 2018	4th	(Ukraine) Serhiy Shevtsov (interim)	14 September 2018	4th
Nyva Ternopil	(Ukraine) Vitaliy Shumskyi	Resigned	24 September 2018	8th	(Ukraine) Vadym Bozhenko (interim)	24 September 2018	8th
Nyva Ternopil	(Ukraine) Vadym Bozhenko (interim)	End of interim spell	16 October 2018	7th	(Ukraine) Oleksandr Stakhiv	16 October 2018	7th
Chaika P. Borshchahivka	(Ukraine) Viacheslav Bohodyelov	Sacked	20 October 2018	10th	(Ukraine) Taras Ilnytskyi	21 October 2018	10th
Nyva Vinnytsia	(Ukraine) Denys Kolchin	Contract ended	13 November 2018	4th (winter break)	(Ukraine) Colince Ngaha	27 January 2019	4th (winter break)
Kalush	(Ukraine) Vasyl Malyk	Resigned	22 November 2018	3rd (winter break)	(Ukraine) Andriy Nesteruk (interim)	2 January 2019	3rd (winter break)
Bukovyna Chernivtsi	(Ukraine) Viktor Mhlynets	Resigned	4 December 2018	10th (winter break)	(Ukraine) Vitaliy Kunytsia (interim)	4 December 2018	10th (winter break)
Nyva Ternopil	(Ukraine) Oleksandr Stakhiv	Change of position	10 January 2019	7th (winter break)	(Ukraine) Vasyl Malyk	10 January 2019	7th (winter break)
MFC Mykolaiv-2	(Ukraine) Vyacheslav Mazarati	Change of position	24 January 2019	7th (winter break)	(Ukraine) Volodymyr Ponomarenko	24 January 2019	7th (winter break)
Krystal Kherson	(Ukraine) Serhiy Shevtsov	Resigned	25 April 2019	4th	(Ukraine) Andriy Kononenko (interim)	26 April 2019	4th
FC Mynai	(Ukraine) Ihor Kharkovshchenko	Resigned	3 May 2019	4th	(Estonia) Kirill Kurenko (interim)	3 May 2019	4th
FC Mynai	(Estonia) Kirill Kurenko (interim)	Reassigned	15 May 2019	3rd	(Estonia) Kirill Kurenko	15 May 2019	3rd

Notes:

- ^(20) After Round 9, Denys Kolchin submitted his resignation but the President of the club, Vasyl Vovk refused to accept it.
- ^(21) Ihor Stolovytskyi left Cherkaskyi Dnipro for Kremin prior to the season starting.

== Group A ==
=== League table ===
Pos	Team	Pld	W	D	L	GF	GA	GD	Pts	Promotion, qualification or relegation
1	FC Mynai (C, P)	27	15	4	8	41	26	+15	49	Promotion to Ukrainian First League
2	Cherkashchyna-Akademiya Bilozirya (P)	27	14	6	7	43	23	+20	48	Qualification to promotion play-offs
3	Polissya Zhytomyr	27	13	6	8	23	21	+2	45	
4	Nyva Vinnytsia	27	11	9	7	29	23	+6	42	
5	Veres Rivne	27	12	5	10	24	22	+2	41	
6	Nyva Ternopil	27	10	6	11	28	29	−1	36	
7	FC Kalush	27	10	6	11	30	33	−3	36	
8	Chaika Petropavlivska Borshchahivka	27	8	7	12	25	28	−3	31	
9	Podillya Khmelnytskyi	27	6	7	14	20	34	−14	25	
10	Bukovyna Chernivtsi	27	5	6	16	19	43	−24	21	Avoided relegation

Updated to match(es) played on 25 May 2019. Source: PFL.ua
Rules for classification: 1) Points; 2) Goal difference; 3) Goals scored; 4) Head-to-head points; 5) Head-to-head goal difference; 6) Head-to-head goals scored; 7) Fair play; 8) Draw or play-off.
(C) Champions; (P) Promoted

=== Results ===
Home \ Away	BUK	CPB	CHE	KAL	MYN	NVT	NVV	POD	POL	VER	BUK	CPB	CHE	KAL	MYN	NVT	NVV	POD	POL	VER
Bukovyna Chernivtsi		0–3	0–1	0–3	0–0	0–2	0–4	3–2	2–2	0–1		0–4				1–2		1–1		0–0
Chaika P-B	1–1		1–0	0–0	1–1	0–0	2–2	0–1	0–1	0–1				2–1			2–1	2–0	1–3	
Cherkashchyna	2–0	1–1 (Note: Due to fan behaviour of FC Cherkaskyi Dnipro in the previous season, Cherkashchyna-Akademiya plays their first three home matches at an empty stadium.)		3–2	3–0	1–1	1–0	3–1	0–1	1–2	2–0	4–1		4–1	3–2			3–0		
FC Kalush	2–0	1–0	1–0		1–0	1–0	1–1	0–0	0–1	1–0	1–3					4–3	2–3		1–2	0–0
FC Mynai	3–0	2–1	3–1	2–0		3–0	2–1	1–0	1–1	2–0	2–1	1–2		3–1			0–1	3–1		
Nyva Ternopil	0–2	2–0	1–1	1–2	3–2		0–1	1–0	0–1	0–1		2–1	1–1		1–2					1–2
Nyva Vinnytsia	2–1	1–0	0–0	1–0	0–0	1–1		2–2	0–0	0–0	1–0		1–0			0–1			1–2	1–3
Podillya Khmelnytskyi	0–0	0–0	1–2	2–1	0–2	0–1	2–0		2–0	0–1				0–1		0–3	1–1		0–1	
Polissya Zhytomyr	1–0	1–0	0–0	1–1	1–0	2–0	0–2	0–0		0–1	0–1		0–4		0–1	0–1				1–2
Veres Rivne	1–3	-:+ (Note: Veres was awarded a technical loss by the FFU CDC in their Round 16 match against Chaika as the team used six substitutions instead of permitted five. The match originally ended in a 1–1 draw.)	0–1	1–1	2–1	0–0	0–1	0–1	0–1			1–0	2–1		1–2			2–3		

Updated to match(es) played on 25 May 2019. Source: (in Ukrainian)
Legend: Blue = home team win; Yellow = draw; Red = away team win.

=== Position by round ===
Team ╲ Round	1	2	3	4	5	6	7	8	9	10	11	12	13	14	15	16	17	18	19	20	21	22	23	24	25	26	27
FC Mynai	9	5	3	3	3	3	3	3	3	1	1	2	2	2	1	1	1	2	3	1	2	4	3	3	2	2	1
Cherkashchyna-Akademiya Bilozirya	6	3	2	1	2	2	2	2	2	5	6	4	5	3	5	5	5	4	2	2	1	1	1	1	1	1	2
Polissya Zhytomyr	7	2	4	7	7	8	7	5	4	2	3	6	6	5	3	2	2	1	1	4	4	2	4	4	3	3	3
Nyva Vinnytsia	4	8	8	6	6	4	4	4	5	4	5	3	3	6	4	3	4	3	5	5	5	3	2	2	4	4	4
Veres Rivne	8	10	9	10	10	10	9	8	6	6	4	5	4	4	6	6	6	6	6	6	6	6	5	5	6	5	5
Nyva Ternopil	5	9	10	9	9	5	6	6	7	8	7	7	8	8	7	7	7	8	7	7	8	7	7	7	7	6	6
FC Kalush	3	4	1	2	1	1	1	1	1	3	2	1	1	1	2	4	3	5	4	3	3	5	6	6	5	7	7
Chaika Petropavlivska Borshchahivka	1	1	5	5	5	6	8	9	9	9	9	9	10	10	9	9	9	9	9	8	7	8	8	8	8	8	8
Podillya Khmelnytskyi	2	7	6	8	8	9	10	10	10	10	10	10	7	7	8	8	8	7	8	9	9	9	9	9	9	9	9
Bukovyna Chernivtsi	10	6	7	4	4	7	5	7	8	7	8	8	9	9	10	10	10	10	10	10	10	10	10	10	10	10	10

Updated to match(es) played on 25 May 2019. Source: pfl.ua

=== Goalscorers ===
As of 25 May 2019

Rank	Scorer	Team	Goals (Pen.)
1	(Ukraine) Robert Hehedosh	FC Mynai	13 (2)
2	(Ukraine) Dmytro Skakun	FC Kalush	11 (5)

== Group B ==
=== League table ===
Pos	Team	Pld	W	D	L	GF	GA	GD	Pts	Promotion, qualification or relegation
1	Kremin Kremenchuk (P, C)	27	18	7	2	48	17	+31	61	Promotion to Ukrainian First League
2	Metalurh Zaporizhya (P)	27	18	2	7	54	24	+30	56	Qualification to promotion play-offs
3	Hirnyk Kryvyi Rih	27	15	6	6	53	33	+20	51	
4	Krystal Kherson	27	15	2	10	43	29	+14	47	
5	Myr Hornostayivka	27	14	3	10	41	30	+11	45	Withdrawn after the season
6	Enerhiya Nova Kakhovka	27	8	7	12	26	31	−5	31	
7	Tavriya Simferopol	27	6	12	9	30	35	−5	30	
8	Real Pharma Odesa	27	5	8	14	23	50	−27	23	
9	MFC Mykolaiv-2	27	5	5	17	22	52	−30	20	
10	FC Nikopol	27	3	4	20	15	54	−39	13	Avoided relegation

Updated to match(es) played on 25 May 2019. Source: PFL.ua
Rules for classification: 1) Points; 2) Goal difference; 3) Goals scored; 4) Head-to-head points; 5) Head-to-head goal difference; 6) Head-to-head goals scored; 7) Fair play; 8) Draw or play-off.
(C) Champions; (P) Promoted

=== Results ===
Home \ Away	ENK	HIR	KRE	KRY	MZA	MV2	MYR	NIK	RPO	TAV	ENK	HIR	KRE	KRY	MZA	MV2	MYR	NIK	RPO	TAV
Enerhiya		2–0	0–2	1–0	0–1	2–0	0–1	0–1	2–0	1–1				0–0	0–2				2–2	0–0
Hirnyk	2–2		1–2	1–0	3–1	7–3	3–2	2–0	3–1	3–3	2–1		1–2		1–3			3–0		1–2
Kremin	2–0	0–0		3–0	1–0	1–0	2–0	1–0	3–0	0–0	2–2			1–0	2–0			3–2		2–0
Krystal	3–0	2–0	1–0		4–1	1–0	2–1	3–1	2–1	3–2		0–3				4–1	0–1	2–0	3–1	
Metalurh	2–1	1–1	1–1	2–0		4–0	2–3	2–0	3–0	1–0				2–0		2–1	2–0	6–0	5–0	
Mykolaiv-2	4–3	0–3	1–1	2–1	0–2		1–0	0–0	2–0	0–0	0–2	1–3	0–4				0–1			
Myr	2–1	1–1	0–1	3–0	2–1	2–0		0–1	3–0	2–1	0–1	0–1	5–2					3–2		2–1
FC Nikopol	0–1	0–2	1–4	0–5	1–2	2–3	1–1		0–1	0–2	0–1					2–1			1–1	0–0
Real Pharma	0–0	3–1	0–2	1–2	1–0	1–1	1–1	2–0		1–1		0–2	1–4			1–0	1–4			
Tavriya Simferopol	2–1	1–2	0–0	1–1	1–3	2–0	2–1	3–0	1–1					0–4	1–3	1–1			2–2	

Updated to match(es) played on 25 May 2019. Source: PFL.ua (in Ukrainian)
Legend: Blue = home team win; Yellow = draw; Red = away team win.

=== Position by round ===
Team ╲ Round	1	2	3	4	5	6	7	8	9	10	11	12	13	14	15	16	17	18	19	20	21	22	23	24	25	26	27
Kremin Kremenchuk	1	1	1	1	1	1	1	1	1	1	2	1	1	1	1	1	1	1	1	1	1	1	1	1	1	1	1
Metalurh Zaporizhya	7	4	7	7	9	8	5	3	4	3	3	4	4	5	5	5	4	4	4	3	3	3	3	3	2	2	2
Hirnyk Kryvyi Rih	5	8	5	2	5	2	2	2	2	2	1	2	3	3	3	3	3	3	3	2	2	2	2	2	3	3	3
Krystal Kherson	2	7	3	3	2	3	3	4	3	4	4	3	2	2	2	2	2	2	2	4	4	5	5	5	4	4	4
Myr Hornostayivka	9	9	8	9	7	4	6	5	5	5	5	5	5	4	4	4	5	5	5	5	5	4	4	4	5	5	5
Enerhiya Nova Kakhovka	10	6	6	6	3	6	7	7	8	9	9	9	7	7	8	8	9	8	8	8	7	7	7	7	6	7	6
Tavriya Simferopol	6	3	4	5	4	5	4	6	6	6	6	6	6	6	6	6	6	6	6	6	6	6	6	6	7	6	7
Real Pharma Odesa	4	2	2	4	6	7	8	8	7	7	7	7	8	8	9	9	8	9	9	9	9	9	8	8	8	8	8
MFC Mykolaiv-2	8	10	10	8	8	9	9	9	9	8	8	8	9	9	7	7	7	7	7	7	8	8	9	9	9	9	9
FC Nikopol	3	5	9	10	10	10	10	10	10	10	10	10	10	10	10	10	10	10	10	10	10	10	10	10	10	10	10

Updated to match(es) played on 25 May 2019. Source: pfl.ua

=== Goalscorers ===
As of 25 May 2019

Rank	Scorer	Team	Goals (Pen.)
1	(Ukraine) Oleksiy Boyko	Myr Hornostayivka	19 (2)
1	(Ukraine) Kostyantyn Cherniy	Kremin Kremenchuk	19 (2)
3	(Ukraine) Ihor Buka	Hirnyk Kryvyi Rih	11
3	(Ukraine) Eduard Sarapiy	Metalurh Zaporizhia	11 (6)

== Post season play-offs ==
The second places of each group will play-off for the third promotion for the First League. Later with withdrawal of several clubs, the format changed (see 2018–19 Ukrainian First League#Format). The second place runners-up will play with the Persha Liha thirteenth and fourteenth places, yet with expansion of the UPL those teams will receive direct promotion and the third placed teams will be contesting promotion in play-offs.

=== Championship game ===
On 7 May 2019 it was announced that the final game between group winners of the Second League will take place in Kropyvnytskyi.

1 June 2019
17:00 UTC+3

FC Mynai	0 – 1	FC Kremin Kremenchuk
	Report	Cherniy 78'

Zirka Stadium, Kropyvnytskyi
Attendance: 520
Referee: Viktor Kopiyevskyi

Kremin Kremenchuk are crowned Champions of the Ukrainian Second League for the 2018–19 season

== Awards ==
=== Monthly awards ===
Month	Player of the Month		
Month	Player	Club	Reference
August 2018	(Ukraine) Oleksiy Boyko	Myr Hornostayivka	
September 2018	(Ukraine) Ihor Yarovoy	Hirnyk Kryvyi Rih	
October 2018	(Ukraine) Vladyslav Ihnatyev	Krystal Kherson	
November 2018	(Ukraine) Roman Loktionov	Cherkashchyna-Akademiya	
April 2019	undisclosed		
May 2019	undisclosed		

=== Round awards ===
Round	Player			Coach		
Round	Player	Club	Reference	Coach	Club	Reference
Round 1	(Ukraine) Kostyantyn Cherniy	Kremin Kremenchuk		(Ukraine) Vasyl Malyk	FC Kalush	
Round 2	(Ukraine) Anatoliy Masalov	Tavriya Simferopol		(Ukraine) Serhiy Shevchenko	Tavriya Simferopol	
Round 3	(Ukraine) Ihor Buka	Hirnyk Kryvyi Rih		(Ukraine) Oleksandr Kyrylyuk	Cherkashchyna-Akademia Bilozirya	
Round 4	(Ukraine) Oleksiy Lytovchenko	Nyva Ternopil		(Ukraine) Denys Kolchin	Nyva Vinnytsia	
Round 5	(Ukraine) Oleksiy Boyko	Myr Hornostayivka		(Ukraine) Oleksandr Ovchinnikov	Krystal Kherson	
Round 6	(Ukraine) Volodymyr Savoshko	Nyva Vinnytsia		(Ukraine) Hennadiy Prykhodko	Hirnyk Kryvyi Rih	
Round 7	(Ukraine) Kostyantyn Cherniy	Kremin Kremenchuk		(Ukraine) Ihor Stolovytskyi	Kremin Kremenchuk	
Round 8	(Ukraine) Andriy Storchous	Cherkashchyna-Akademia Bilozirya		(Ukraine) Oleh Taran	Metalurh Zaporizhzhia	
Round 9	(Ukraine) Vladyslav Ihnatyev	Krystal Kherson		(Ukraine) Oleh Shandruk	Veres Rivne	
Round 10	(Ukraine) Eduard Sarapiy	Metalurh Zaporizhzhia		(Ukraine) Ihor Kharkivshchenko	FC Mynai	
Round 11	(Ukraine) Ivan Dotsenko	Myr Hornostayivka		(Ukraine) Serhiy Shevtsov	Krystal Kherson	
Round 12	(Ukraine) Roman Loktionov	Cherkashchyna–Akademiya		(Ukraine) Vitaliy Kostyshyn	Podillya Khmelnytskyi	
Round 13	(Ukraine) Andriy Barladym	Krystal Kherson		(Ukraine) Ihor Kharkivshchenko	FC Mynai	
Round 14	(Ukraine) Yuriy Malyey	Myr Hornostayivka		(Ukraine) Oleksandr Kyrylyuk	Cherkashchyna–Akademiya	
Round 15	(Ukraine) Dmytro Bardadym	MFC Mykolaiv-2		(Ukraine) Serhiy Shevtsov	Krystal Kherson	
Round 16	(Ukraine) Serhiy Hvozdevych	Hirnyk Kryvyi Rih		(Ukraine) Anatoliy Bezsmertnyi	Polissya Zhytomyr	
Round 17	(Ukraine) Dmytro Skakun	FC Kalush		(Ukraine) Serhiy Shevtsov	Krystal Kherson	
winter break
Round 18	(Ukraine) Oleksandr Yarovenko	Metalurh Zaporizhzhia		(Ukraine) Oleh Taran	Metalurh Zaporizhzhia	
Round 19	(Ukraine) Vitaliy Boyko	Cherkashchyna-Akademia Bilozirya		(Ukraine) Vitaliy Kunytsya	Bukovyna Chernivtsi	
Round 20	(Ukraine) Andriy Hryhoryk	Hirnyk Kryvyi Rih		(Ukraine) Ihor Stolovytskyi	Kremin Kremenchuk	
Round 22	(Ukraine) Yevhen Katelin	Hirnyk Kryvyi Rih		(Ukraine) Oleksandr Kyrylyuk	Cherkashchyna-Akademiya	
Round 23	(Ukraine) Oleksiy Boyko	Myr Hornostayivka		(Ukraine) Oleksandr Sapelnyak	Myr Hornostayivka	
Round 24	(Ukraine) Mykhaylo Shestakov	Veres Rivne		(Ukraine) Oleh Taran	Metalurh Zaporizhzhia	
Round 25	(Ukraine) Robert Hehedosh	FC Mynai		(Ukraine) Colince Ngaha	Nyva Vinnytsia	
Round 21	(Ukraine) Dmytro Makhnyev	Enerhiya Nova Kakhovka		(Ukraine) Ihor Stolovytskyi	Kremin Kremenchuk	
Round 26	(Ukraine) Illya Shevtsov	Krystal Kherson		(Ukraine) Vasyl Malyk	Nyva Ternopil	
Round 27	(Ukraine) Serhiy Sukhanov	Polissya Zhytomyr		(Estonia) Kirill Kurenko	FC Mynai	

== See also ==
- 2018–19 Ukrainian Premier League
- 2018–19 Ukrainian First League
- 2018–19 Ukrainian Cup
