= FC Karpaty Halych =

Karpaty Halych
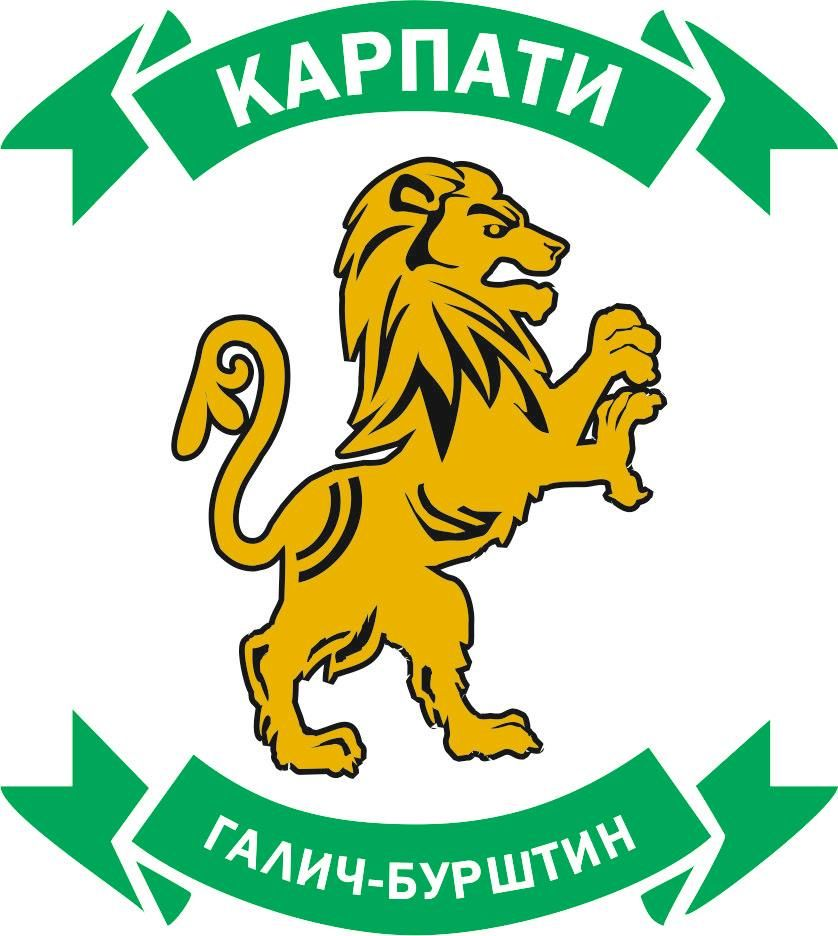
- Full name: FC Karpaty Halych
- Founded: 1949
- Dissolved: 2022
- Ground: Enerhetyk Stadium, Burshtyn; Kolos Stadium, Halych
- Capacity: 3,000; 800
- 2021–22: Ukrainian Second League, Group A, 7th of 14 (withdrew)
Home colours	Away colours

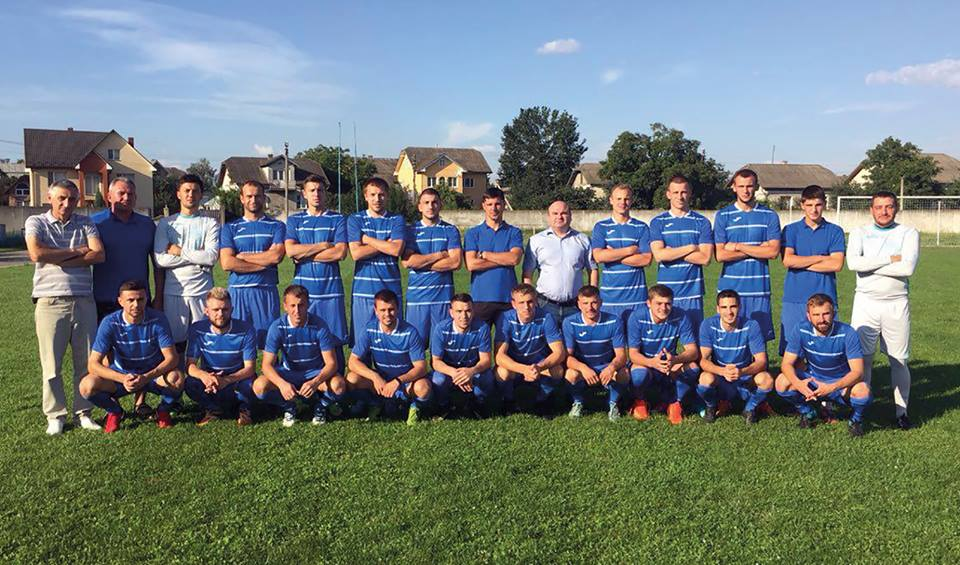
Karpaty in 2018

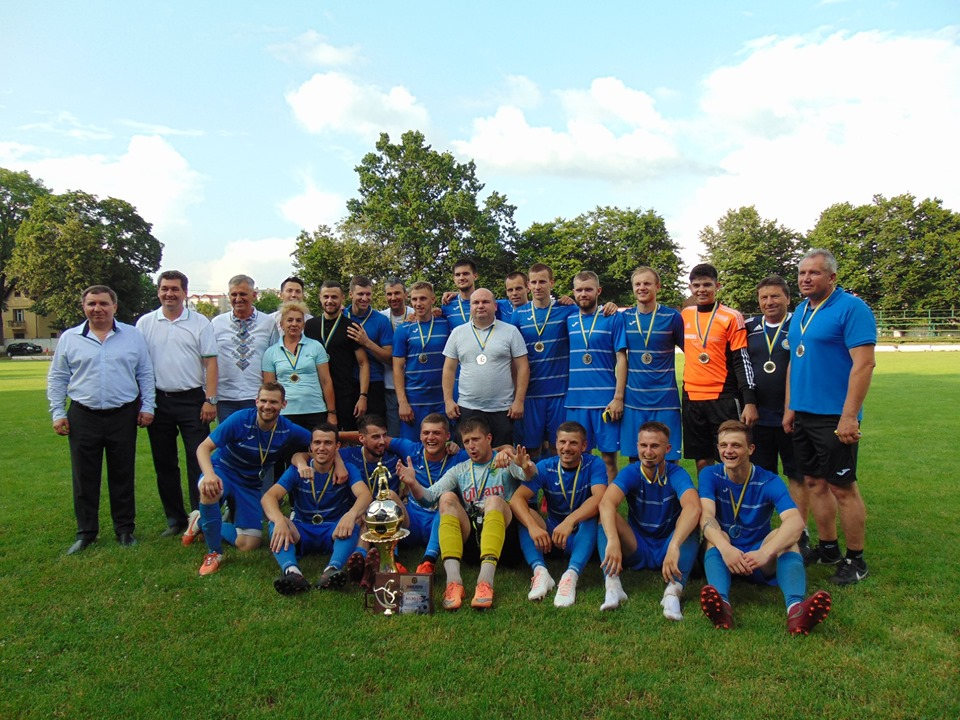
Karpaty in 2019

FC Karpaty Halych (Ukrainian: Футбольний клуб «Карпати») was a professional Ukrainian football club from the historical city of Halych.

The club was formed back in 1949 as Kolhospnyk Halych, part of the Kolos sports society. In 2000–2009, it was a farm club of FC Enerhetyk Burshtyn.

== History ==
The club also represented the city of Burshtyn and, in 2000–2009, was a farm club of FC Enerhetyk Burshtyn. In 2019, the club merged with Enerhetyk Burshtyn. Since 2020, it served as a farm club of FC Karpaty Lviv.

"Karpaty" debuted in the Ukrainian Second League in the 2020–21 season.

=== Former names ===
- First formation
  - 1949–1964 Kolhospnyk Halych
- Second formation
  - 1967–1983 Dynamo Halych
- Third formation
  - 1984–1993 Dnister Halych
  - 1993–2000 Halychyna Halych
  - 2000–2010 Enerhetyk-Halychyna-2 Halych (second team of FC Enerhetyk Burshtyn)
- Fourth formation
  - 2009–2009 Dnister Halych
  - 2009–2017 Hal-Vapno Halych
  - 2017–2018 Halych
  - 2018– Karpaty Halych

== League and cup history ==
Season	Div.	Pos.	Pl.	W	D	L	GS	GA	P	Domestic Cup	Europe	Notes
2019–20	4th	4										Promoted
2020–21	3rd	5										

== Managers ==
- 2018–2019 Andriy Nesteruk
- 2019–2020 Petro Rusak
- 2020–2021 Roman Hnativ
- 2021 Lyubomyr Vovchyk
- 2021-2022 Carlos Inarejos
