= SC Chaika Petropavlivska Borshchahivka =

SC Chaika
- Full name: SC Chaika Petropavlivska Borshchahivka
- Founded: 1976; 50 years ago
- Ground: Kozak-Arena, Petropavlivska Borshchahivka
- President: Oleksandr Nihrutsa
- Manager: Serhiy Syzykhin
- League: Ukrainian Second League
- 2024–25: Ukrainian Second League, 7th (Group B)
- Website: sc-chayka.com.ua
Home colours	Away colours

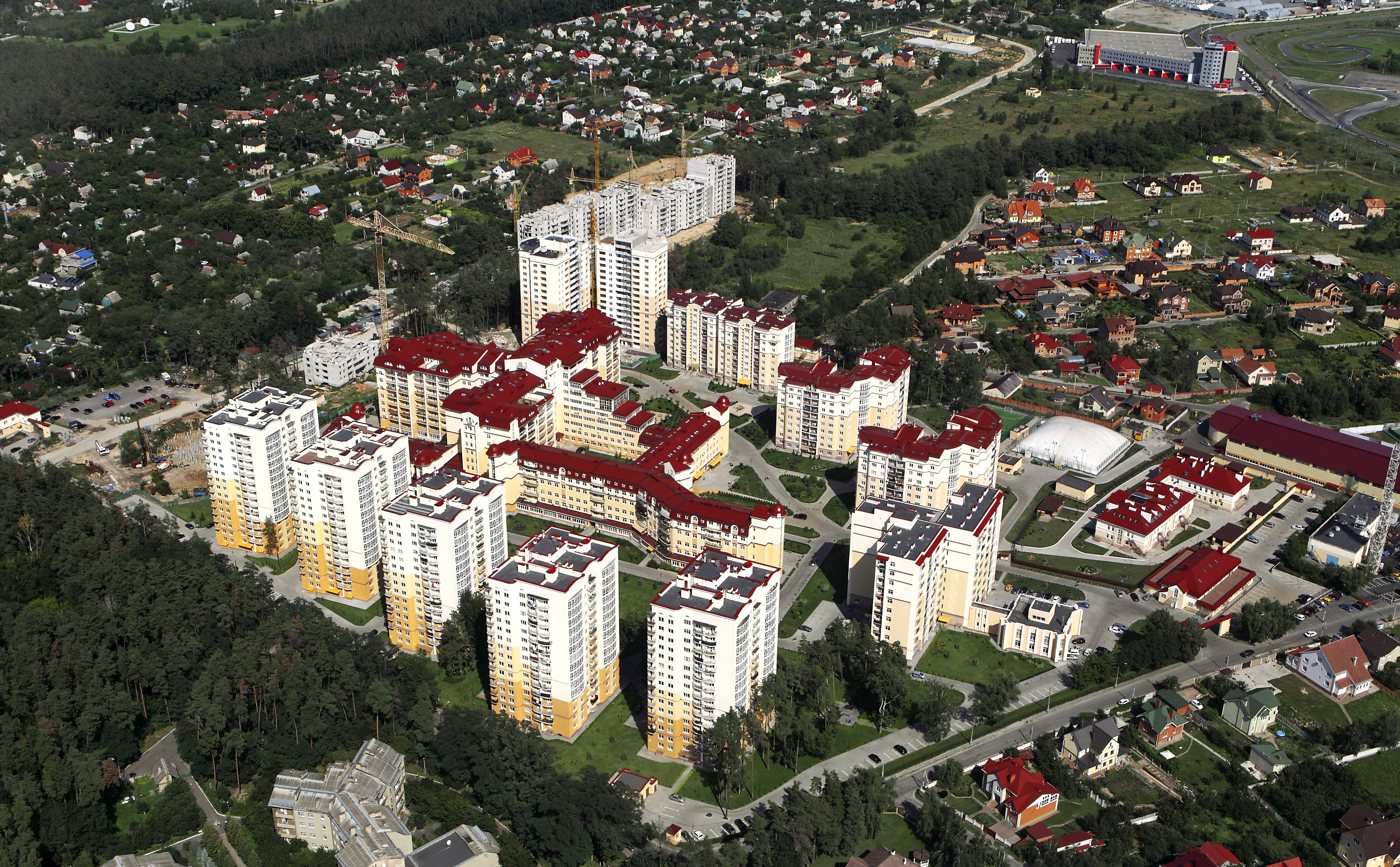
The Chaika residential neighborhood near Kyiv

SC Chaika Petropavlivska Borshchahivka (Ukrainian: Футбольний клуб «чайка») is a Ukrainian football club based in Petropavlivska Borshchahivka, Bucha Raion, just outside Kyiv. The club has been playing in Ukrainian Second League since 2018. Chaika plays its home matches in various suburbs of Kyiv, while its official home ground is the Kozak-Arena.

The club is located next to the Chaika residential neighborhood on the western outskirts of Kyiv, which contains several sports venues such as a dirt racing track, a dirt airfield, and others. The area was established back in 1934 as part of the Soviet organization Osoaviakhim, later DOSAAF.

== History ==
The club was founded in 1976 and participated in the regional competition. With the fall of the Soviet Union, the club disappeared.

In 2008, it was reestablished again and for almost its first decade, competed exclusively at the regional level.

In 2016–2018, the club was fielding its football team in the national league among amateurs.

The club was admitted to the Professional Football League of Ukraine after passing attestation for the 2018–19 Ukrainian Second League season.

=== Logo, name, and symbols ===
The club's symbol is a gull, which is known as "chaika" in Slavic languages. On the logo before 2020, it contained the coat of arms of Petropavlivska Borshchahivka. Earlier versions of the logo contained a temple and a "Kyiv chestnut leaf".

Logo from 2008 until 2020

== Honors ==
- Ukrainian Amateur Cup
  - Winners (2): 2013, 2016–17
- Kyiv Oblast Championship
  - Winners (1): 2015
  - Runners-up (4): 2011, 2012, 2013, 2014
- Kyiv Oblast Cup
  - Winners (1): 2013

== Current squad ==
As of 7 September 2026

Note: Flags indicate national team as defined under FIFA eligibility rules; some limited exceptions apply. Players may hold more than one non-FIFA nationality.

No.	Pos.	Nation	Player
2	MF	UKR	Yevhen Tytarenko
3	DF	UKR	Maksym Kramarenko
4	DF	UKR	Mykhaylo Tymoshenko
6	MF	UKR	Oleh Ostrolutskyi
7	MF	UKR	Volodymyr Lazarets
9	FW	UKR	Valentyn Ovcharuk
10	MF	UKR	Mykhaylo Hopkalo
11	MF	UKR	Maksym Kudelin
17	MF	UKR	Mykyta Sviderskyi
19	MF	UKR	Dmytro Denisyenko
21	DF	UKR	Mykyta Baranov

No.	Pos.	Nation	Player
23	DF	UKR	Anton Muzychenko
29	MF	UKR	Hleb Venher
33	FW	UKR	Oleksandr Bondarchuk
36	DF	UKR	Oleksandr Kozintsev
40	DF	UKR	Artem Makhonin
45	GK	UKR	Volodymyr Kolomiyets
55	DF	UKR	Rostyslav Kovalyov
77	MF	UKR	Stepan Klymenko
95	FW	UKR	Maksym Holovko
96	GK	UKR	Yehor Shariy
97	DF	UKR	Vladyslav Dzyuba

== League and cup history ==
Season	Div.	Pos.	Pl.	W	D	L	GS	GA	P	Domestic Cup	Other		Notes
2016	4th Gr.4	3	6	1	2	3	5	10	5				
2016–17	4th Gr.A	2	20	12	3	5	28	16	39	Amateur Cup	UAC	Winner	
2017–18	4th Gr.B	5	14	4	5	5	14	19	17	Amateur Cup	UAC	1/16 finals	
2018–19	3rd "A"	8_{/10}	27	8	7	12	25	28	31	1/64 finals			
2019–20	3rd "A"	7_{/11}	20	7	5	8	25	21	26	1/32 finals			
2020–21	3rd "A"	8_{/13}	24	6	7	11	26	32	25				
2021–22	3rd "A"	12_{/15}	19	3	6	10	16	40	15				
2022–23	3rd	3_{/10}	18	10	5	3	33	20	35				
2023–24	3rd	_{/15}											

== Managers ==
- ?–2015 Oleksandr Ihnatyev
- 2016–2017 Viktor Yaichnyk
- 2017 Serhiy Konyushenko
- 2018 Anatoliy Kretov
- 2018 Viacheslav Bohodyelov
- 2018–2020 Taras Ilnytskyi
- 2020 Oleksandr Protchenko (interim)
- 2020–2021 Oleksandr Shcherbakov
- 2021– Viacheslav Bohodyelov (interim)

== See also ==
- Kyiv Chaika Airfield
- Autodrome Chaika
