= Oleksandr Ihnatyev =

Ukrainian footballer

Personal information
- Full name: Oleksandr Volodymyrovych Ihnatyev
- Date of birth: 23 June 1971 (age 55)
- Place of birth: Kyiv, Ukrainian SSR, Soviet Union
- Height: 1.83 m (6 ft 0 in)
- Position: Forward

Youth career
- ????–1988: Dynamo Kyiv

Senior career*
Years	Team	Apps	(Gls)
1988–1991	FC Dynamo Kyiv	0	(0)
1990	→ FC Temp Korsun-Shevchenkivskyi	10	(2)
1991	FC Geolog Tyumen	10	(0)
1992	FC Nyva Vinnytsia	5	(0)
1992	FC Khimik Zhytomyr	11	(1)
1992	FC Ros Bila Tserkva	14	(0)
1993	FC Khimik Severodonetsk	18	(5)
1994	CSK ZSU Kyiv	16	(2)
1995	FC Skhid Slavutych	29	(10)
1995–1996	FC Nyva Myronivka	31	(11)
1996	FC Polihraftekhnika Oleksandriya	4	(0)
1997–1998	FC Spartak Lukhovitsy	45	(8)
2000	FC Dnipro Kyiv	8	(2)
2001	FC Tytan Irshansk	14	(0)

Managerial career
- ????–2015: SC Chaika Kyiv-Sviatoshyn Raion
- 2016–: FC Vyshneve
- * Club domestic league appearances and goals

Oleksandr Ihnatyev (Ukrainian: Олександр Володимирович Ігнатьєв; born 23 June 1971) is a former Ukrainian football forward.
