= Albert Shakhov =

Ukrainian footballer and manager

Albert Heorhiyovych Shakhov Альберт Георгійович Шахов
Personal information
- Date of birth: 5 October 1975 (age 51)
- Place of birth: Ukrainian SSR, Soviet Union
- Height: 1.74 m (5 ft 9 in)
- Position: Midfielder

Team information
- Current team: Volyn Lutsk (U19)

Youth career
- SDYuShOR Dnipro-75 Dnipropetrovsk

Senior career*
Years	Team	Apps	(Gls)
1992	Metalurh Dniprodzerzhynsk	4	(0)
1992–1994	Shakhtar Pavlohrad	77	(4)
1994	Dnipro Dnipropetrovsk	2	(0)
1995–1996	Metalurh Novomoskovsk	32	(0)
1996	Kremin Kremenchuk	6	(0)
1996	→ Hirnyk-Sport Komsomolsk (loan)	1	(0)
1996	Maccabi Petah Tikva	3	(0)
1997	Nyva Vinnytsia	10	(0)
1997	Uralmash Yekaterinburg	20	(0)
1999	Dynamo Stavropol	1	(0)
2000–2001	Volyn Lutsk	24	(4)
2001–2004	Prykarpattia / Spartak	30	(2)
2001–2004	→ Lukor / Spartak-2 (loan)	44	(5)
2003	→ Krymteplytsia Molodizhne (loan)	12	(1)
2004	SC Mykolaiv	14	(0)
2005	FC Bershad	3	(0)
2005	Sokil Berezhany	2	(0)
2005	Yalos Yalta	6	(0)
2006–2008	Khimik Krasnoperekopsk	72	(14)
2008–2009	FC Sevastopol	30	(7)
2009	Feniks-Illichovets Kalinine	15	(4)
2010	Orlicz Suchedniów	15	(4)
2010	Stal Kraśnik	15	(2)
2010	FC Foros	7	(1)
2011	Haray Zhovkva		
2012	Zhemchuzhyna Yalta	16	(2)
2016	FC Lutsk	5	(0)
Total		466	(50)

Managerial career
- 2010: Feniks-Illichovets Kalinine (assistant)
- 2011–2012: Zhemchuzhyna Yalta (assistant)
- 2013–2015: DYuSSh Volyn Lutsk (assistant)
- 2015–2016: Volyn Lutsk (under-19)
- 2016–2017: Volyn Lutsk (assistant)
- 2017: Volyn Lutsk (acting)
- 2017–2020: Volyn Lutsk (assistant)
- 2020–2021: Volyn-2 Lutsk
- 2021–2022: Volyn Lutsk
- 2022–: Volyn Lutsk (U19)
- * Club domestic league appearances and goals

Albert Heorhiyovych Shakhov (Ukrainian: Альберт Георгійович Шахов; born 5 October 1975) is a Ukrainian former professional footballer and current manager of under-19 squad of Volyn Lutsk.

== Career ==
Albert Shakhov is a product of the Dnipro-75 sports school and started his career in clubs of the Dnipropetrovsk Oblast Metalurh Dniprodzerzhynsk, Shakhtar Pavlohrad, Metalurh Novomoskovsk. Couple of games Shakhov managed to play for his main club Dnipro, but in 1996 he first to Kremenchuk and later Israel.

Until 2000 Shakhov was returning to Ukraine on occasions and going back to Russia playing for lower league clubs in both countries. With a short stop in Lutsk, in 2001 he moved to Ivano-Frankivsk spending there few years.

Sometime in 2005 Shakhov moved to Crimea where he retired and remained with the newly organized FC Zhemchuzhyna Yalta until 2013.

In 2013 Shakhov moved to coach at the Volyn Lutsk sports school.
