= FC Uzhhorod =

- Full name: Football Club Uzhhorod
- Founded: 2015 / 2024
- Ground: Avanhard Stadium
- Capacity: 12,000
- President: Rudolf Blazhinets
- Head coach: Yaromyr Loboda
- League: Ukrainian Second League
- 2024–25: 6th in Group A
- Website: https://fcuzhhorod.com.ua/
Home colours	Away colours

Football Club Uzhhorod is a Ukrainian professional football club from Uzhhorod previously competing in the regional competitions of Zakarpattia Oblast and Ukrainian amateur competitions. Reactivated in 2024, FC Uzhhorod was reestablished on FC FCI Uzhhorod.

== History ==
The club was founded in 2015. It is the third attempt to create a city football team in post Soviet Ukraine in Uzhhorod.

The first time it was made in 1995 by Mykola Sydor, but the team only existed for a single season. In 2011, the second city team was active for couple of seasons on initiative of the president of the Uzhhorod city football federation Viktor Kachur.

Due to the full-scale invasion of Ukraine by Russia, the club withdrew from professional competitions in 2022.

In 2024 the club was readmitted to the Second League, merging prior to that with another regional-level club FC "Family of Christ International (FCI)" Uzhhorod. While being denied the application to the professional competitions, the club's administration managed to successfully appeal the PFL decision.

== Honours ==
Football championship of Zakarpattia Oblast

- Winners (2): 2015, 2016

Football cup of Zakarpattia Oblast

- Winners (2): 2015, 2016

== Players ==
As of 4 March 2026

Note: Flags indicate national team as defined under FIFA eligibility rules; some limited exceptions apply. Players may hold more than one non-FIFA nationality.

No.	Pos.	Nation	Player
3	DF	UKR	Yuriy Vashkeba
5	DF	UKR	Maksym Tereshchenko
6	MF	UKR	Dmytro Antoshyn
7	FW	UKR	Kyrylo Khovayko (on loan from UCSA Tarasivka)
8	MF	UKR	Yevheniy Voloshyn
9	MF	UKR	Serhiy Rebrysh
10	FW	UKR	Rostyslav Zipir
11	FW	UKR	Matviy Zherebetskyi (on loan from UCSA Tarasivka)
14	DF	UKR	Robert Smokorovskyi
15	MF	UKR	Dmytro Ivanov
17	FW	UKR	Maksym Kichun
19	DF	UKR	Arsen Bilinskyi
20	MF	UKR	Dmytro Shukh

No.	Pos.	Nation	Player
21	GK	UKR	Vladyslav Hlyvka
29	DF	UKR	Maksym Mynaylenko
30	DF	UKR	Yuriy Havrylets
31	MF	UKR	Svyatoslav Serdyukovskyi
34	MF	UKR	Dmytro Rozhko
42	DF	UKR	Oleksandr Savchuk
44	DF	UKR	Ivan Ilchuk
70	MF	UKR	Ivan Morylyak
77	MF	UKR	Maksym Bysaha
88	FW	UKR	Dmytro Kovalenko
95	GK	UKR	Hlib Bushnyak
99	GK	UKR	Andriy Kotsan

== League and cup history ==
Season	Div.	Pos.	Pl.	W	D	L	GS	GA	P	Domestic Cup	Other	Notes
2018–19	4th "A"	6_{/10}	18	6	2	10	26	37	20			Admitted
2019–20	3rd "A"	10_{/11}	20	5	4	11	19	36	19	1/64 finals		
2020–21	3rd "A"	2_{/13}	24	17	4	3	50	23	55	1/32 finals		Promoted

== Presidents ==
- 2015 – 2022 Ivan Duran
- 2024 – present Rudolf Blazhinets
  - 2024 – present Vadym Gyorgy (director)

== Coaches ==
- 2015 Mykhaylo Ivanytsia
- 2016 Ivan Shanta
- 2017 – 2018 Taras Tulaydan
- 2018 Myroslav Babiak
- 2019 Vasyl Varha
- 2020 Mykhaylo Ivanytsia
- 2020 – 2021 Volodymyr Vasyutyk
- 2021 Mykhaylo Ivanytsia
- 2021 – 2022 Bohdan Blavatskyi (caretaker)
- 2024 – present Yaromyr Loboda

== See also ==
- FC Hoverla Uzhhorod
