= FC Nafkom Brovary =

- Founded: 1996 (amauters); 2001 (professional club)
- Dissolved: 2009
- League: Druha Liha
- 2008–09: 5th (withdrew)

FC Nafkom Brovary was a Ukrainian professional team from Brovary in Kyiv Oblast.

Nafkom stands for the name of the firm owned by the club's investors.

== History ==
The professional club was formed in 2001 in Irpin, Kyiv Oblast in the name of Nafkom-Akademia under the auspices of the Financial and Commercial Educational Institution (UFEI) that is in Irpin. In 2002 there was another club from Brovary that competed in the Ukrainian Amateur Cup.

In 2008–2009, Oleh Fedorchuk was a manager of the club.

Nafkom withdrew after the 2008–09 season completed failing to receive a professional license. Many players along with a football manager Oleh Fedorchuk joined FC Nyva Vinnytsia.

== Team names ==
Year	Name
1996–1999	UFEI Irpin (as amateurs)
2000	Akademia Irpin (as amateurs)
2001–2004	Nafkom-Akademia Irpin (entering the Professional Football League)
2004–2009	Nafkom Brovary (moved to Brovary prior to start of season)

== Honors ==
- Ukrainian Druha Liha: 1

2002/03 Champions Group B

Runners Up: 1

2001/02 Group B

== League and cup history ==
Season	Div.	Pos.	Pl.	W	D	L	GS	GA	P	Domestic Cup	Europe	Notes
1997–98	4th "2"	4	14	7	1	6	12	11	22			as UFEI Irpin
1998–99	4th "2"	5	14	6	4	4	12	12	22			as UFEI Irpin
1999	4th "2"	6	10	1	2	7	5	14	5			as UFEI Irpin
2000	4th "3"	2	8	3	3	2	9	6	12			as Akademia Irpin
2000	4th "10"	4	6	0	1	5	3	19	1			as Akademia Irpin
2001–02	3rd "B"	2	34	19	6	9	50	23	63	Did not enter		as Nafkom-Akademia Irpin
2002–03	3rd "B"	1	30	20	7	3	69	20	67	1/8 finals		Promoted as Nafkom-Akademia Irpin
2003–04	2nd	14	34	9	11	14	35	43	38	1/16 finals		as Nafkom-Akademia Irpin
2004–05	2nd	16	34	9	10	15	26	38	37	1/16 finals		Relegated
2005–06	3rd "C"	4	24	12	6	6	28	18	42	1/32 finals		
2006–07	3rd "A"	6	28	13	7	8	40	30	46	1/32 finals		
2007–08	3rd "A"	13	30	7	8	15	33	46	29	1/32 finals		
2008–09	3rd "A"	5	32	16	4	12	45	33	52	1/64 finals		Withdrew

=== European competitions ===
For the 1999 UEFA Regions' Cup where Ukraine was represented by a team of UFEI Kyiv (Kyiv amateurs according to the UEFA), which was composed out of the Kyiv students. The team also was a host for the preliminary round. The final tournament to which UFEI qualified was held in Italy in fall of 1999.

Games of Kyiv (amateurs) in UEFA competitions
Season	Competition	Round	Club	Home	Away	Aggregate
1999	UEFA Regions' Cup	Group 3	Armenia	3–0	—	1st
1999	UEFA Regions' Cup	Group 3	(Belarus) Minsk	(3–0)	—	1st
1999	UEFA Regions' Cup	Group 3	(Moldova) Ialoveni	3–0	—	1st
1999	UEFA Regions' Cup	Group B	Israel	—	1–1	2nd
1999	UEFA Regions' Cup	Group B	(Italy) Veneto	—	1–2	2nd
1999	UEFA Regions' Cup	Group B	(Georgia (country)) Tbilisi	—	4–1	2nd

== Managers ==
- 2001–2004 Oleh Fedorchuk
- 2004 Vitaliy Belokon
- 2005–2007 Aleksandr Deriberin
- 2007–2009 Oleh Fedorchuk

== See also ==
- FC Brovary
