= Kyiv Chaika Airfield =

Kyiv Chaika
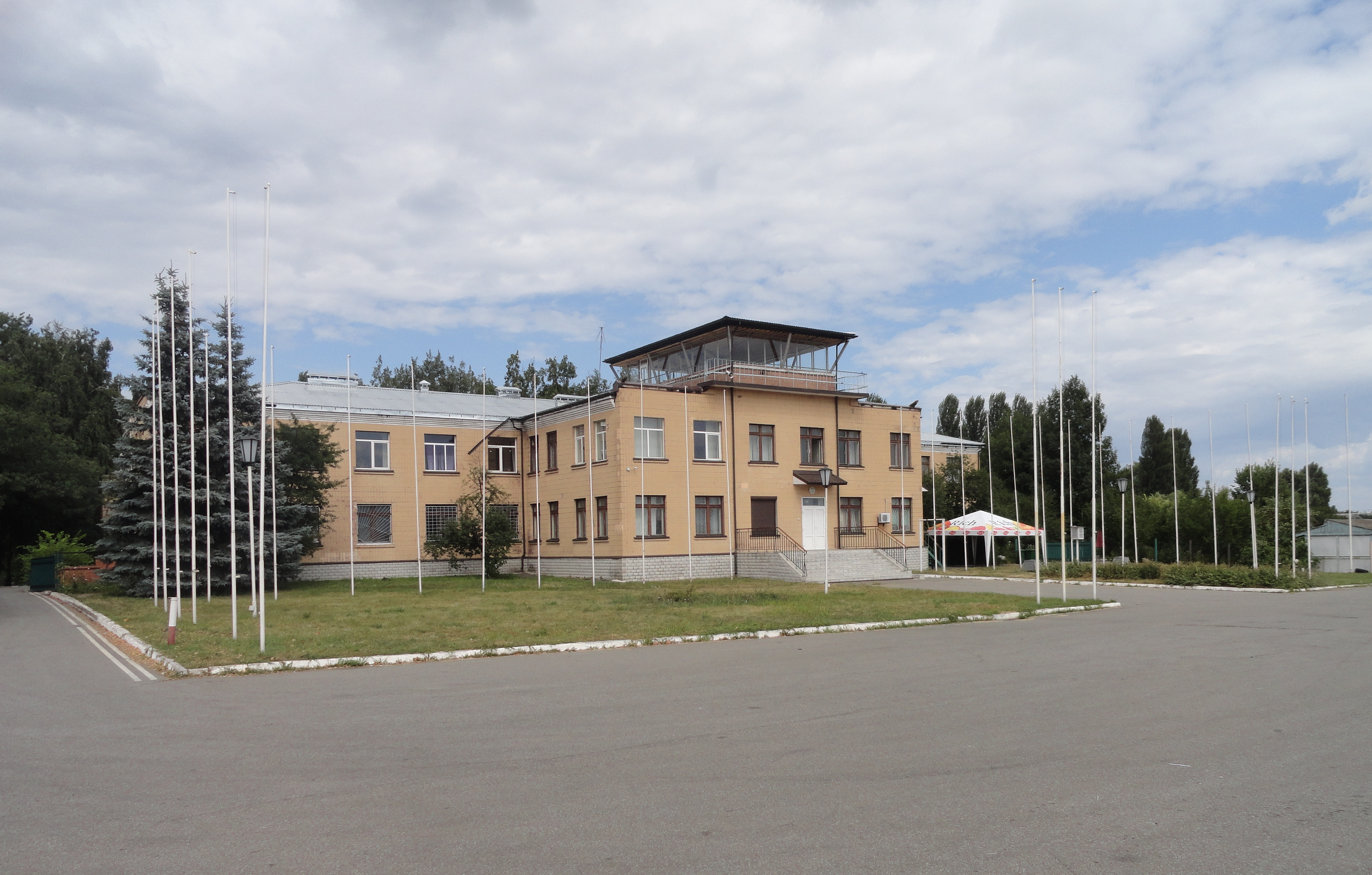
- Control tower Chayka airfield
- IATA: none; ICAO: UKKJ

Summary
- Airport type: Public
- Location: Kyiv
- Elevation AMSL: 600 ft / 183 m
- Coordinates: 50°25′48″N 030°17′48″E
- Interactive map of Kyiv Chaika

Runways
Direction	Length		Surface
Direction	ft	m	Surface
	3,937	1,200

Kyiv Chaika Airfield (Ukrainian: Аеродром «Київ Чайка», also given as Kyiv West) is a recreational aerodrome in Ukraine located in Petropavlivska Borshchahivka (Kyiv-Sviatoshyn Raion, Kyiv Region), about 15 km (9 mi) west of Kyiv. It is a general aviation airfield with Antonov An-2, An-28, and other single-engine aircraft. There is a paved 150 x 45 m tarmac ramp.

It is an integral part of the Seagull Sports Complex. An aeroclub is based at the airport, training parachutists and beginners training under the United States Air Force Academy program. The sports complex is adjacent to the suburban residential complex of the same name, which got its name because of its proximity to the airfield.

== Notable events at the airport ==
- Chayka Aviation Parade was a large-scale aviation show dedicated to the Independence Day of Ukraine that took place in 1997. The parade was attended by President of Ukraine Leonid Kuchma, and Minister of Defense Oleksandr Kuzmuk.
- In addition, air shows, concerts and festivals are held periodically.

== See also ==
- SC Chaika Petropavlivska Borshchahivka
