= Vasyl Malyk =

Ukrainian footballer (born 1968)

Personal information
- Full name: Vasyl Ivanovych Malyk
- Date of birth: 23 November 1968 (age 57)
- Place of birth: Drohobych, Ukrainian SSR
- Height: 1.70 m (5 ft 7 in)
- Position: Midfielder

Youth career
- Drohobych sports school

Senior career*
| Years | Team | Apps | (Gls) |
| 1986–1989 | Avanhard Drohobych | | |
| 1990 | Krystal Chortkiv | 11 | |
| 1991 | Halychyna Drohobych | 4 | (0) |
| 1991–1993 | JKS 1909 Jarosław | 59 | (14) |
| 1993–1997 | Halychyna Drohobych | 85 | (5) |
| 1998 | indoor football | | |
| 1999–2000 | Reformatsiya Abakan | 35 | (9) |
| 2000 | Metallurg Krasnoyarsk | 1 | (0) |
| 2001–2002 | Halychyna Drohobych | | |
| 2002 | Karpaty Truskavets | | |

Managerial career
- 2001: Halychyna Drohobych
- 2003: Halychyna Drohobych
- 2014–2017: Skala Stryi
- 2017–2018: Kalush
- 2019–2020: Nyva Ternopil
- 2021–2023: Mykolaiv
- 2023: Nyva Ternopil
- * Club domestic league appearances and goals

Vasyl Malyk (Ukrainian: Василь Іванович Малик; born 23 November 1968) is a Ukrainian football coach and former player.
