= FC Kalush =

- Full name: Football Club Kalush
- Founded: 1947
- Dissolved: 2020
- Ground: "Khimik"
- Capacity: 7,000
Home colours	Away colours

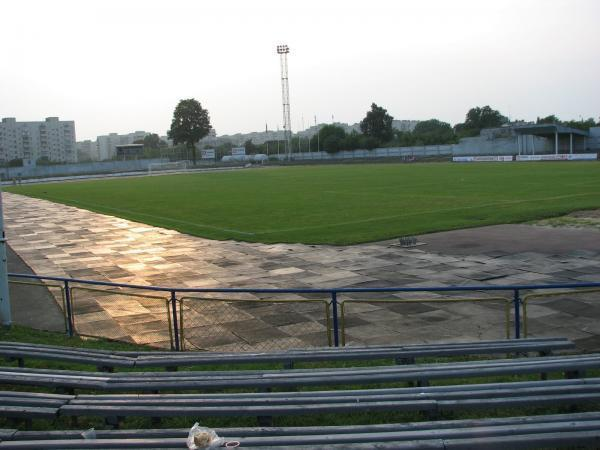
Khimik Stadium in Kalush

FC Kalush (Ukrainian: Футбольний клуб «Калуш») was a Ukrainian professional football club from Kalush, Ivano-Frankivsk Oblast.

== History ==
The club was founded soon after World War II as Khimik Kalush and in the Soviet competitions competed at regional level and KFK (amateur level). The club was reestablished in place of previously existed Polish club at the chemical plant TESP that also was overtaken by Soviets. Khimik Kalush also was associated with the Soviet chemical and metallurgical association "Khlorvinil" that was expanded in 1961.

At KFK level the club competed until 1995, when as Khimik entered the Druha Liha. Its main sponsor "Khlorvinil" was reorganized as a state enterprise "Oriana". Later in 1995, Khimik renamed themselves to FC Kalush.

The club struggled at this level of competition. In 2001, "Oriana" and the Russian oil conglomerate Lukoil created a joint venture "Lukor". In 2001 the club also renamed themselves to FC LUKOR Kalush and the new sponsorship immediately improved the status of the club. In 2002 Lukor already announced about its financial instability and filed for bankruptcy. In the next season the club won the Druha Liha 2002–03 Group A championship. However, at the end of the season the club was bought out by neighboring club FC Prykarpattya Ivano-Frankivsk and they were subsequently renamed and made into a reserve club.

The club renamed again to FC Spartak-2 Ivano-Frankivsk in 2004 and later in that year they were dissolved.

The club reformed in 2006 and played at the Amateur level.

On 17 January 2014, Lukor Kalush filed for bankruptcy and its liquidation.

After a break of over 10 years the club was readmitted to the Professional Football League of Ukraine for the 2018–19 Ukrainian Second League competition.

=== Emblems ===
Emblem of Prykarpattia Kalush (a farm club of FC Spartak Ivano-Frankivsk)

Emblem of FC LUKOR Kalush, note that the name is spelled as Luk and Or

== Honors ==
- Ukrainian Druha Liha
  - Winners (1): 2002/03 Group A (as LUKOR Kalush)
- Ukrainian Football Amateur League
  - Winners (1): 1994-95 Group 1
  - Finalists (1): 1992-93 Group 1
- Ukrainian Amateur Cup
  - Finalists (1): 1972
- Ivano-Frankivsk Oblast Football Federation championship
  - Winners (13): 1947, 1952, 1955, 1957, 1958, 1959, 1960, 1961, 1966, 1967, 1969, 1975, 1978, 1995
  - Finalists (9): 1949
- Ivano-Frankivsk Oblast Football Federation Cup
  - Winners (14):

== League and cup history ==
Season	Div.	Pos.	Pl.	W	D	L	GS	GA	P	Domestic Cup (Note: Since the 2000–01 season 2nd clubs or reserve clubs could not enter the Ukrainian Cup competition)	Europe	Notes
1987	4th	3	14	7	2	5	17	11	16			as Kolos Kalush
1988	4th	5	18	7	5	6	14	11	19			as Kolos Kalush
1990	4th	6	28	11	8	9	39	26	30			as Halychyna Kalush
1991	4th											
1992–93	4th	2	24	15	3	6	50	30	33			as Khimik Kalush
1993–94	4th	6	26	11	4	11	34	32	26			
1994–95	4th	1	26	16	6	2	37	12	48			
1995–96	3rd "A"	5	40	22	8	10	64	31	74	1/32 finals		Renamed (Note: During the winter break the club was renamed from Khimik Kalush to FC Kalush)
1996–97	3rd "A"	11	30	9	8	13	32	29	35	1/128 finals		
1997–98	3rd "A"	15	34	11	5	18	32	42	38	1/32 finals		
1998–99	3rd "A"	12	28	6	8	14	20	45	26	Did not enter		
1999-00	3rd "A"	15	30	6	6	18	19	51	24	1/32 finals Second League Cup		
2000–01	3rd "A"	15	30	7	2	21	26	74	23	1/32 finals Second League Cup		
2001–02	3rd "A"	5	36	19	8	9	63	35	65	1st Round		Renamed (Note: Prior to the start of the season the club was renamed to FC LUKOR Kalush)
2002–03	3rd "A"	1	28	21	2	5	56	25	65	1/32 finals		Club taken over (Note: The club was taken over by FC Prykarpattya Ivano-Frankivsk who finished in 17th place in the Ukrainian First League 2002-03 season and were to be relegated.)
2003–04	3rd "A"	8	30	11	4	15	29	31	37			Reserve club (Note: Prior to the start of the season the club was renamed to Prykarpattya Kalush and the club became the reserve team of FC Prykarpattya Ivano-Frankivsk)— Renamed (Note: During the winter break the club was renamed to FC Spartak-2 Kalush after the main club was renamed to FC Spartak Ivano-Frankivsk)
2004–05	3rd "A"	13	28	6	2	20	17	12	20			Club folds (Note: During the winter break the club dissolves. Technical victories are awarded to their opponents.)
2006–16	Club reforms as FC Kalush (Note: The club returns to the name FC Kalush and competes at the Amateur level in the Ivano-Frankivsk Oblast competition)											
2017–18	4th "1"	5	16	7	3	6	16	14	24	1/16 finals (amateurs)		Applied (Note: Applied to the Second League)
2018–19	3rd "A"	7_{/10}	27	10	6	11	30	33	36	1/8 finals		
2019–20	3rd "A"	5_{/11}	20	8	5	7	26	20	29	1/32 finals		

== Notable players ==
- (Soviet Union) Yozhef Sabo

== Coaches ==
- 1997 Ivan Krasnetskyi
- 2000 Volodymyr Holovatyi
- 2001 Volodymyr Mandryk
- 2001–2002 Mykola Prystay
- 2002 Ihor Yurchenko
- 2003 Mykola Prystay
- 2016–2017 Petro Lesiv
- 2017 Stepan Matviyiv
- 2017–2018 Vasyl Malyk
- 2019–2020 Andriy Nesteruk
- 2019 Vasyl Kachur
- 2019– Stepan Matviyiv

== See also ==
- TESP (company)
