= Mykhaylo Ivanytsia =

Association football player

Mykhailo Ivanytsia
Personal information
- Date of birth: 8 August 1960 (age 66)
- Place of birth: Stavne, Ukrainian SSR, Soviet Union
- Position: Midfielder

Youth career
- Sports school #2 (Uzhhorod)

Senior career*
Years	Team	Apps	(Gls)
1979–1981	Zakarpattia Uzhhorod	65	(3)
1982	Frunzenets Sumy	35	(2)
1983–1985	Zakarpattia Uzhhorod	63	(2)
1988	Zirka Kirovohrad	20	(0)
Total		183	(7)

Managerial career
- 1992–1997: Zakarpattia Uzhhorod (assistant)
- 1996–1998: FC Uzhhorod
- 1998–2001: Zakarpattia Uzhhorod (assistant)
- 2001–2002: Zakarpattia-2 Uzhhorod
- 2002–2007: Zakarpattia Uzhhorod (assistant)
- 2008–2009: Zakarpattia Uzhhorod
- 2009–2010: Zakarpattia Uzhhorod (reserves)
- 2010–2013: Zakarpattia Uzhhorod (assistant)
- 2016: FC Baranyntsi
- 2016: Mynai
- 2020: Uzhhorod
- 2020: FC Torpo
- 2021: Uzhhorod
- * Club domestic league appearances and goals

Mykhailo Ivanytsia (Ukrainian: Михайло Михайлович Іваниця, born 8 August 1960) is a Ukrainian professional football manager and former Soviet player.

== Biography ==
Mykhailo Ivanytsia was born in a village Stavne, Velykyi Bereznyi Raion. His football career he began for a village team "Verkhovyna" and later was invited to a sports school in Uzhhorod.

In 1979 the head coach of FC Zakarpattia Uzhhorod Istvan Sandor invited Ivanytsia to the team of masters (Note: A team of masters was an official status of professional clubs in the Soviet football due to specifics of the Soviet economic system.) in the main squad. In 1980 Ivanytsia was drafted to armed forces as part of compulsory military service in the Soviet Union and served in the sports company in Lviv, (Note: Lviv served as a center of the Soviet Carpathian Military District.) but later returned to the club. In 1982 he moved to FC Frunzenets Sumy and already in Sumy Ivanytsia enrolled in a local economic faculty of the Sumy Institute of National Economy. Soon again he returned to Zakarpattia. In 1985 to 1988 he played for FC Zirka Kirovohrad.

Due to injuries, Ivanytsia retired and accepted the offer to lead the "Trudovi Rezervy" sports school in Uzhhorod. In 1992 the head coach of Zakarpattia Yuriy Chyrkov invited him as an assistant back to the club and where until 2013 Ivanytsia stayed performing various coaching functions including the club's head coach. During that time along with Yuriy Kalitvintsev and Viktor Ryashko led the club to promotions to the Ukrainian Premier League including the 2008–09 season during which Ivanytsia performed as the head coach.

On 10 July 2020 Ivanytsia became a head coach of Hungarian amateur club Torpo.

== Honours and achievements ==
Zakarpattia Uzhhorod

- Ukrainian First League: 2008–09
