= FC Obolon-2 Bucha =

Coordinates: 50.527078°N 30.508018°E

Obolon-2 Bucha
- Full name: FC Obolon-2 Bucha
- Nickname: Pyvovary
- Ground: Stadium Yuvileinyi, Bucha
- Capacity: 1,028
- Chairman: Oleksandr Slobodian
- Senior coach: Andriy Kornyev (interim)
- League: Ukrainian Second League
- 2019–20: Group A, 11th

FC Obolon-2 Bucha is the second team of Ukrainian professional football club FC Obolon Kyiv based in Bucha.

It started in 2001 and played until February 2013, when it was discontinued for financial reasons. In 2019, the team was revived based on the Obolon-Brovar U-19 team and enrolled into Ukrainian Second League, playing home games at Stadium Yuvileinyi in Bucha.

== Club history ==
FC Obolon Kyiv played in the Ukrainian Second League until it was promoted to the Ukrainian First League (Persha Liha) in 2001. The club entered its reserve team Obolon-2 into Ukrainian Second League (Druha Liha) for the following season.

During the winter break of the 2008-09 season the 2nd team was withdrawn due to a lack of funds.

The team reformed as Obolon Kyiv Reserves and competed in the Ukrainian Premier Reserve League as the senior team was a member of the Ukrainian Premier League. When the senior team was relegated from the Premier League after the 2010–11 Ukrainian Premier League season, the club re-entered their reserve club into the Ukrainian Second League.

The senior club withdrew from the PFL in February 2013 due to a lack of funds.

== League and cup history ==
Season	Div.	Pos.	Pl.	W	D	L	GS	GA	P	Domestic Cup	Europe	Notes
Obolon-2
1998-99	4th Gr "2"	4	14	7	1	6	20	16	22			Admitted
1999-2000	3rd "B"	2	34	21	7	6	59	24	70			Relegated
2000–01 in city competitions
2001–02	3rd "B"	16	34	8	11	15	34	56	35			
2002–03	3rd "B"	11	30	10	7	13	41	45	37			
2003–04	3rd "A"	7	30	9	12	9	25	30	39			
2004–05	3rd "A"	14	28	4	7	17	21	49	19			
2005–06	3rd "A"	9	28	9	8	11	31	36	35			
2006–07	3rd "A"	12	28	5	9	14	26	45	24			
2007–08	3rd "A"	5_{/16}	30	15	6	9	50	36	51			
2008–09	3rd "A"	16_{/17}	32	5	4	23	20	30	19			Withdraw
joined the UPL U-21 team competition
2012–13	3rd "A"	9_{/11}	20	5	3	12	21	30	18			Withdrew
revived based on U-19 team, in 2017–2019 in Professional Football League of Ukraine Under 19
2019–20	3rd "A"	11_{/11}	20	4	4	12	18	38	16			Avoided relegation

== See also ==
- FC Obolon Kyiv
