= Oleksiy Boyko =

Ukrainian footballer (born 1992)

Personal information
- Full name: Oleksiy Vasylyoych Boyko
- Date of birth: 19 March 1992 (age 34)
- Place of birth: Krasnyi Luch, Ukraine
- Height: 1.86 m (6 ft 1 in)
- Position: Forward

Youth career
- 2007–2010: Stal Alchevsk

Senior career*
Years	Team	Apps	(Gls)
2015	Kafa Feodosia		
2015–2017	Krymteplytsia Molodizhne		
2017–2018	Kyzyltash Bakhchysaray	12	(2)
2017–2019	Myr Hornostaivka	33	(13)
2019–2020	Lokomotiv Yerevan	16	(7)
2019–2020	Hirnyk-Sport Horishni Plavni	7	(2)
2020–2021	Kramatorsk	5	(0)
2020–2022	Tavriya Simferopol	36	(23)
2022	FC Continentals		
2024–2025	Atlant-Tosno	6	(4)
- * Club domestic league appearances and goals as of 20 July 2025

Oleksiy Vasylyoych Boyko (Ukrainian: Олексій Васильович Бойко; born 19 March 1992) is a Ukrainian footballer who plays as a forward.

== Career ==
=== Crimea ===
Boyko began playing at the youth level with Stal Alchevsk in 2007. He later transitioned into the amateur level in 2011 with Shakhtar Krasnyi Luch, where he played for three seasons. In 2015, he joined the professional ranks by playing in the regional Crimean circuit with Kafa Feodosia. He resumed playing in the Crimean top tier by signing with Krymteplytsia Molodizhne. After several seasons in Molodizhne, he signed with league rivals Kyzyltash Bakhchisaray in 2017.

=== Ukraine ===
For the remainder of the 2017-18 season, he returned to his native Ukraine to play in the Ukrainian Second League with Myr Hornostayivka. In his debut season in the third tier, he appeared in 10 matches and recorded 4 goals. He re-signed with Hornostayivka the following season, and throughout the season, he was named the player of the week twice in the 5th and 23rd rounds of the season. He also finished the campaign as the league's top goal scorer with 19 goals.

Following a successful season in the Ukrainian third tier, he played abroad in the Armenian First League with Lokomotiv Yerevan. After a brief stint in Armenia, he returned to Ukraine to play in the Ukrainian First League with Hirnyk-Sport Horishni Plavni. In 2020, remained in the second tier by signing with Kramatorsk, where he appeared in five matches. After two seasons in the second division, he returned to the third tier to sign with Tavriya Simferopol. In his debut season with Tavriya, he was named the player of the week in the 25th round. He re-signed with Tavriya the following season. In his second season, he finished as the club's top goal scorer with 13 goals.

=== Canada ===
In the summer of 2022, he went abroad for the second time to play in the Canadian Soccer League with FC Continentals. He debuted on May 29, 2022, against the Serbian White Eagles, where he recorded a goal. Throughout the season, he helped the club secure a postseason berth by finishing fourth in the standings. He also finished as the club's top goal scorer with four goals and helped the Continentals to win the CSL Championship by defeating Scarborough SC.

=== Russia ===
In 2024, Boyko played in the Russian Amateur Football League with Atlant-Tosno.

== Honors ==
FC Continentals

- CSL Championship: 2022

Individual

- Ukrainian Second League Group B top scorer: 2020–21
