= Andriy Kornyev =

Ukrainian footballer

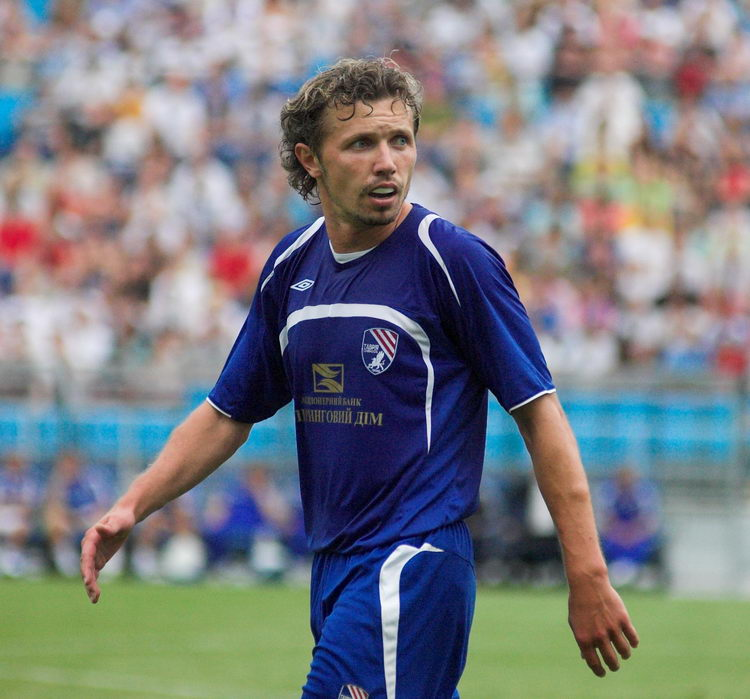

Personal information
- Full name: Andriy Volodymyrovych Kornyev
- Date of birth: 1 November 1978 (age 48)
- Place of birth: Kyiv, Ukrainian SSR, Soviet Union
- Height: 1.80 m (5 ft 11 in)
- Position: Defender

Team information
- Current team: Obolon-2 Bucha (caretaker)

Youth career
- Dynamo Kyiv

Senior career*
| Years | Team | Apps | (Gls) |
| 1997–1998 | Dynamo-3 Kyiv | 29 | (3) |
| 1998–2003 | Obolon Kyiv | 98 | (20) |
| 1998–2003 | → Obolon-2 Kyiv | 29 | (5) |
| 2003–2004 | Systema-Boreks Borodianka | 24 | (4) |
| 2004–2005 | Arsenal Kharkiv | 17 | (0) |
| 2005–2007 | Tavriya Simferopol | 65 | (3) |
| 2007–2009 | Chornomorets Odesa | 25 | (0) |
| 2009–2011 | Tavriya Simferopol | 73 | (3) |
| 2012–2021 | Obolon Kyiv | 164 | (1) |
| 2019–2021 | → Obolon-2 Bucha | 32 | (0) |

Managerial career
- 2020–2021: Obolon-2 Bucha (assistant)
- 2021–: Obolon-2 Bucha (caretaker)
- * Club domestic league appearances and goals as of 24 August 2020

Andriy Volodymyrovych Kornyev (Ukrainian: Андрій Володимирович Корнєв; born 1 November 1978) is a Ukrainian football manager and professional football defender who is a playing coach for Obolon-2 Bucha.

== Career ==
Graduating for the Dynamo Kyiv Youth Academy, Kornyev was promoted to Dynamo-3 playing in the lower leagues. Spotted by Obolon Kyiv he moved there, followed by a transfer to FC Systema-Boreks in Borodyanka. Soon Kornyev relocated outside of Kyiv Oblast to Kharkiv in FC Arsenal Kharkiv.

Kornyev moved to Tavriya in 2004. In SC Tavriya Simferopol he played 64 games and scored 3 goals. In January 2007, he was purchased by Chornomorets Odesa. At age 30, Kornyev returned to Tavria in January 2009 with only three goals scored in the Top League.
