= TESP (company) =

Polish mining company

TESP (English: Society for the Exploitation of Potassium Salt, Polish: Towarzystwo Eksploatacji Soli Potasowych) was a private mining enterprise, which existed in the Second Polish Republic, with head office in Lwow. It operated potassium salt mines in Kalusz and Stebnik, and sponsored a soccer team TESP Kalusz. Before World War I, the potassium salt mines in Kalusz and Stebnik had been operated by the government of Austria-Hungary.

In 1961 in its place was created a big Soviet chemical and metallurgical association Khlorvinil that used to employ some 17,000 workers.

== See also ==
- Ugartsthal - an ethnic German village, whose name was in late 1930s changed to Tespowo, after the company.
