= Volodymyr Vasyutyk =

Ukrainian footballer

Personal information
- Full name: Volodymyr Bohdanovych Vasiutyk
- Date of birth: 24 March 1970 (age 56)
- Place of birth: Uzhhorod, Ukrainian SSR, Soviet Union
- Height: 1.85 m (6 ft 1 in)
- Position: Goalkeeper

Youth career
- 1985–1987: LOShISP Lviv

Senior career*
Years	Team	Apps	(Gls)
1987–1991	Zakarpattia Uzhhorod	67	(0)
1991	Shakhtar Donetsk	1	(0)
1992–1997	Verkhovyna Uzhhorod	155	(0)
1997	Zirka Kirovohrad	6	(0)
1997	→ Zirka-2 Kirovohrad (loan)	5	(0)
1998	Papirnyk Malyn	11	(0)
1999–2000	Zakarpattia Uzhhorod	43	(0)
Total		277	(0)

Managerial career
- 2001–2005: Zakarpattia Uzhhorod (assist coach)
- 2005: Zakarpattia Uzhhorod (interim)
- 2005–2008: Zakarpattia Uzhhorod (assist coach)
- 2008: Zakarpattia Uzhhorod (interim)
- 2008: Metalurh Zaporizhya (assist coach)
- 2008–2012: Karpaty Lviv (GK coach)
- 2012–2016: Hoverla Uzhhorod (assist coach)
- 2016–2019: Karpaty Lviv (assist coach)
- 2020: Shakhter Karagandy (GK coach)
- 2020–2021: Uzhhorod
- * Club domestic league appearances and goals

Volodymyr Vasyutyk (Ukrainian: Володимир Богданович Васютик; born 24 March 1970) is a former Soviet and Ukrainian football goalkeeper and Ukrainian coach.

In 2021 FC Uzhhorod managed by Vasiutyk gained promotion to the First League (tier 2).
