= Oleksandr Shcherbakov =

Ukrainian footballer (born 1960)

Oleksandr Shcherbakov Олександр Щербаков
Personal information
- Date of birth: 31 July 1960 (age 66)
- Place of birth: Kryvyi Rih, Ukrainian SSR, Soviet Union
- Height: 1.72 m (5 ft 8 in)
- Position: Forward

Youth career
- 1973–1977: Kryvbas Kryvyi Rih

Senior career*
| Years | Team | Apps | (Gls) |
| 1977–1978 | Kryvbas Kryvyi Rih | 16 | (0) |
| 1979–1980 | SKA Kiev | 28 | (1) |
| 1981–1982 | Dnepr Mogilev | 30+ | (11+) |
| 1983–1985 | Chornomorets Odesa | 56 | (11) |
| 1986 | Dynamo Kyiv | 12 | (1) |
| 1987–1991 | Chornomorets Odesa | 121 | (27) |
| 1992 | Budapesti VSC | 3 | (0) |
| 1992 | Karpaty Krosno | | |
| 1993 | Chornomorets Odesa | 10 | (4) |
| 1993–1994 | Hapoel Be'er Sheva | 9 | (1) |
| 1994–1995 | Birzula Kotovsk | 11 | (0) |
| 1995 | Rybak Odesa | | |
| 1995–1997 | Dnister Ovidiopol | | (50) |
| 1997–1998 | SC Odesa | 37 | (10) |
| 1999–2000 | Richelieu Odesa | | |

International career
- USSR U21

Managerial career
- 1997: SC Odesa
- 1997–1998: SC Odesa (assistant)
- 1998–1999: SC Odesa
- 1999–2000: CSKA-3 Kyiv
- 1999–2000: CSKA-2 Kyiv (assistant)
- 2001–2003: Obolon Kyiv (assistant)
- 2003–2005: Dnipro Cherkasy
- 2007: Stal Dniprodzerzhynsk
- 2011: SKAD-Yalpuh Bolhrad
- 2020–2021: Chaika Petropavlivska Borshchahivka
- * Club domestic league appearances and goals

Oleksandr Ivanovych Shcherbakov (Ukrainian: Олександр Іванович Щербаков; born 31 July 1960) is a Ukrainian professional football manager and former Soviet and Ukrainian player.
