= Vladyslav Ihnatyev =

Ukrainian footballer

Personal information
- Full name: Vladyslav Serhiyovych Ihnatyev
- Date of birth: 25 October 1997 (age 29)
- Place of birth: Kherson, Ukraine
- Height: 1.80 m (5 ft 11 in)
- Position: Midfielder

Youth career
- 2010–2011: Shakhtar Donetsk
- 2011–2012: Krystal Kherson
- 2012–2014: Metalurh Zaporizhzhia

Senior career*
Years	Team	Apps	(Gls)
2014–2015	Metalurh Zaporizhzhia	1	(0)
2016	Dynamo Kyiv	0	(0)
2016	Lutsk (amateurs)	3	(0)
2017	Chornomorets Odesa	0	(0)
2017–2018	Metalurh Zaporizhzhia (amateurs)	17	(2)
2018–2019	Krystal Kherson	20	(4)
2019–2021	Inhulets Petrove	5	(0)
2021	→ Hirnyk-Sport Horishni Plavni (loan)	3	(0)
- * Club domestic league appearances and goals as of 15 January 2022

Vladyslav Ihnatyev (Ukrainian: Владислав Сергійович Ігнатьєв; born 25 October 1997) is a Ukrainian football midfielder.

== Career ==
Ihnatyev is a product of FC Shakhtar, FC Krystal and FC Metalurh Zaporizhzhia youth sportive systems.

He made his debut for Metalurh Zaporizhzhia in the Ukrainian Premier League in a match against FC Dynamo Kyiv on 4 December 2015.
