= Vyacheslav Bohodyelov =

Ukrainian goalkeeper and coach

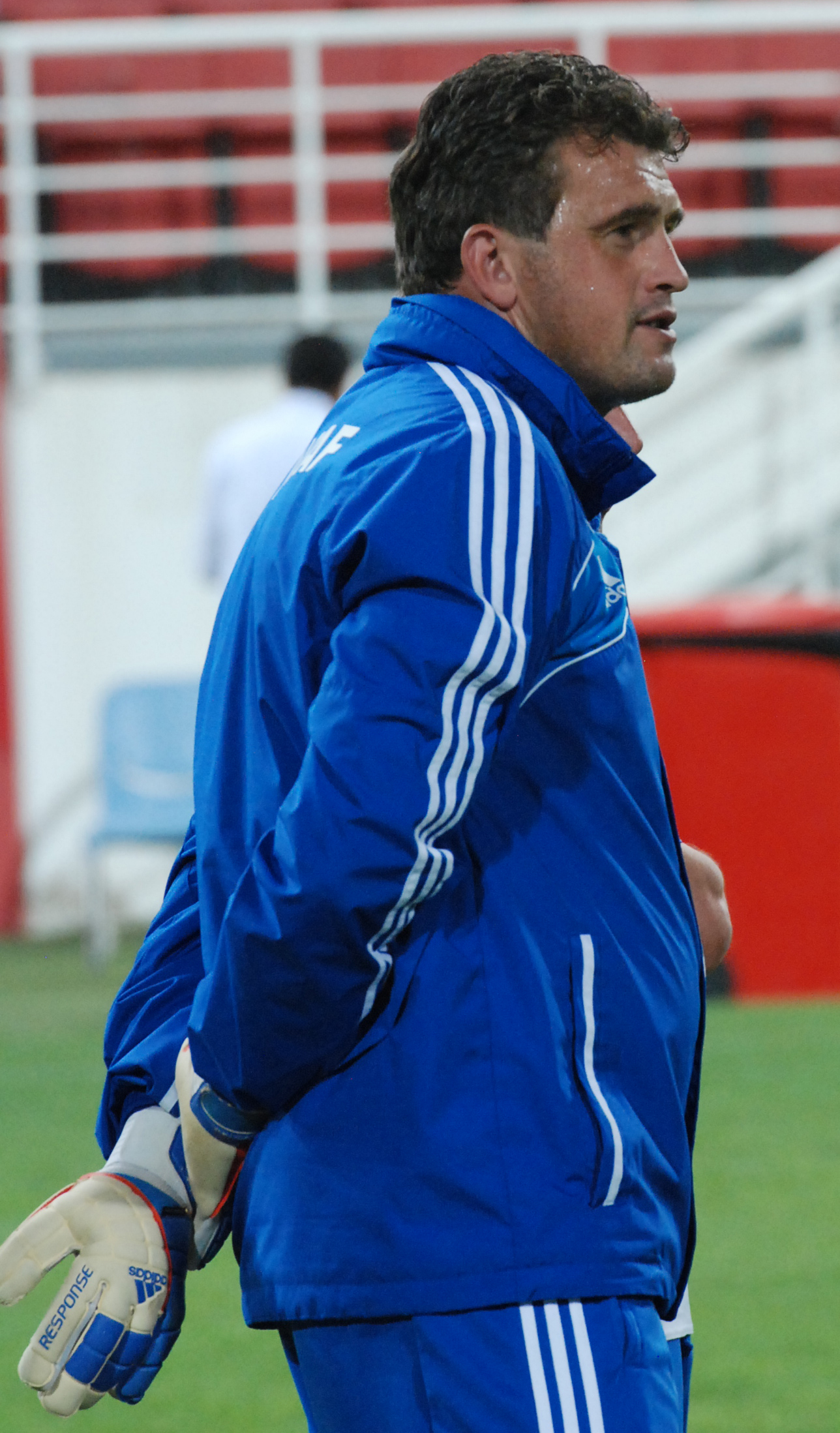

Personal information
- Full name: Vyacheslav Pavlovych Bohodyelov
- Date of birth: 7 October 1969 (age 57)
- Place of birth: Kyiv, Ukrainian SSR
- Height: 1.88 m (6 ft 2 in)
- Position: Goalkeeper

Youth career
- Bilshovyk Kyiv

Senior career*
Years	Team	Apps	(Gls)
1992	FC Nart Cherkessk	12	(0)
1992–1993	PFC Nyva Ternopil	3	(0)
1994–1996	FC Krystal Chortkiv	65	(0)
1995	→ FC Nyva Vinnytsia (loan)	0	(0)
1997	FC Polihraftekhnika Oleksandriya	14	(0)
1997–1998	FC Krystal Kherson	36	(0)
1998	FC Metalurh Donetsk	11	(0)
1999–2000	FC Vorskla Poltava	25	(0)
1999–2000	→ FC Vorskla-2 Poltava	16	(0)
2001	FC Metalist Kharkiv	7	(0)
2001	→ FC Metalist-2 Kharkiv	6	(0)
2002	FC Systema-Borex Borodianka	6	(0)
2003	FC Polissya Zhytomyr	1	(0)
2009	FC Oleksandriya	0	(0)

Managerial career
- 2002–2008: FC Dynamo Kyiv (goalkeeping coach)
- 2008–2010: FC Oleksandriya (goalkeeping coach)
- 2010: FC Lviv (goalkeeping coach)
- 2010–2012: FC Nasaf (goalkeeping coach)
- 2013: FC Volyn Lutsk (goalkeeping coach)
- 2005–2017: Ukraine (U16, U17, U18, U19) (goalkeeping coach)
- * Club domestic league appearances and goals

Vyacheslav Pavlovych Bohodyelov (Ukrainian: Вячеслав Павлович Богодєлов; born 7 October 1969) is a Ukrainian retired football goalkeeper and current goalkeeping coach of Chaika Petropavlivska Borshchahivka.

== Biography ==
He was born on 7 October 1969 in the family of football player Pavlo Bohodyelov, who was also a native of Kyiv city and played for several "teams of masters" (a Soviet terminology for professional teams). Vyacheslav Bohodyelov was a pupil of the Kyiv football schools "Bilshovyk" and "Metalist". His football career, Bohodyelov started in amateur clubs Naftovyk Pyriatyn and Spartak Zolotonosha. In 1991, he played one game for FC Dnipro Cherkasy in the Soviet Cup.

Professional career started for Bohodyelov in the following teams: "Nart" Cherkessk (where he played once as a field player, 1992), "Nyva" Ternopil (1992–1994), "Krystal" Chortkiv (1994–1996), "Polihraftekhnika" Oleksandriya (1996–1997), "Krystal" Kherson (1997- 1998), "Metalurh" Donetsk (1998–1999), "Vorskla" Poltava (1998–2000), "Metalist" Kharkiv (2000–2002), "Systema-Boreks" Borodianka (2002–2003), "Polissia" Zhytomyr (2003).

It happened so that for most of his career, Bohodyelov played as a backup goalkeeper in many clubs. In Nyva he was a spotter for Dmytro Tyapushkin, in Vorskla for Andriy Kovtun, in Metalist for Oleksandr Horyainov, in Metalurh for Yuriy Virt.

Upon the termination of his career as a player, Bohodyelov became a football coach. He worked as a goalkeeping coach for national junior teams of Ukraine (U16, U17, U18, U19), Dynamo Kyiv, FC Oleksandriya, FC Lviv, FC Nasaf Karshi, FC Volyn Lutsk. In Nasaf, Bohodyelov worked together with Anatoliy Demyanenko.

Bohodyelov coached several notable goalkeepers, among whom are Denys Boyko, Dmytro Nepohodov, Artem Kichak, Bohdan Sarnavskyi, and many others.

== Honours ==
PFC Oleksandriya

- Ukrainian First League bronze medalist (2009, 2010)

FC Nasaf

- Uzbek League bronze medalist (2010)
- Uzbek League silver medalist (2011)
- Uzbekistan Cup finalist (2011)
- AFC Cup champion (2011)
