= Oleh Fedorchuk =

Soviet footballer and manager

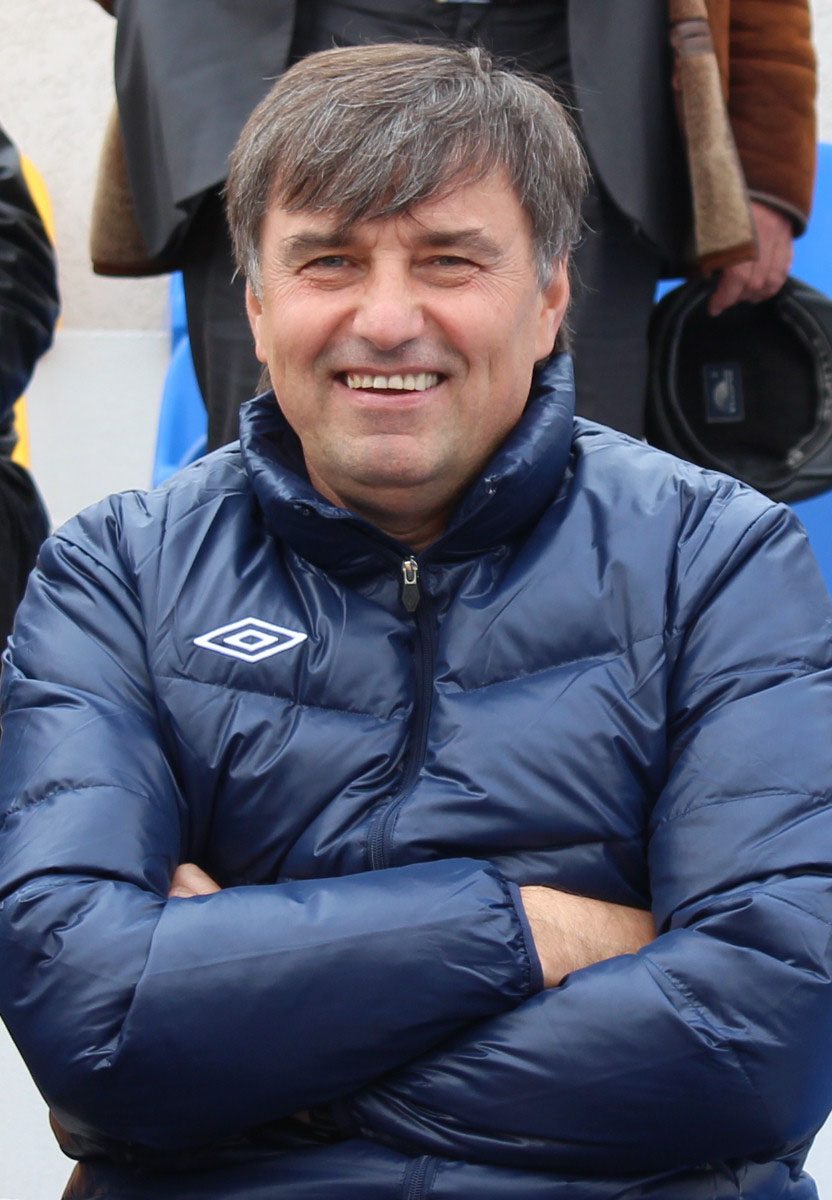
- Fedorchuk in 2013

Personal information
- Full name: Oleh Viktorovych Fedorchuk
- Date of birth: February 10, 1961 (age 65)
- Place of birth: Korosten, Ukrainian SSR
- Position: Defender

Senior career*
| Years | Team | Apps | (Gls) |
| 1979–1980 | Mashynobudivnyk Borodyanka | | |
| 1981 | Dnipro Cherkasy | | |
| 1982–1988 | North Group of SA (Poland) | | |
| 1988–1989 | Sudnobudivnyk Mykolaiv | | |
| 1989 | Volyn Lutsk | | |
| 1990 | Dynamo Bila Tserkva | | |
| 1991 | Temp Shepetivka | | |

Managerial career
- 1999–2000: Obolon Kyiv
- 2001–2004: Nafkom Brovary
- 2004–2005: Tavriya Simferopol
- 2006: Krymteplytsia Molodizhne
- 2007: Knyazha Shchaslyve
- 2007–2009: Nafkom Brovary
- 2009–2011: Nyva Vinnytsia
- 2012: Arsenal Bila Tserkva (consultant)
- 2013: Mykolaiv
- 2014–2015: Mykolaiv
- 2015: Poltava
- 2016–2020: Enerhiya Nova Kakhovka
- 2021: Tavriya Simferopol
- * Club domestic league appearances and goals

Oleh Fedorchuk (Ukrainian: Олег Вікторович Федорчук; born February 10, 1961), is a retired Soviet footballer and Ukrainian football manager.

== Career ==
In 2009–2011, he was a coach in PFC Nyva Vinnytsia. He signed a two-year contract on July 1, 2009, and left FC Nyva in October 2011.
