= Oleksandr Kyrylyuk =

Ukrainian footballer (born 1964)

Personal information
- Full name: Oleksandr Illich Kyrylyuk
- Date of birth: 28 September 1964 (age 62)
- Place of birth: Lutsk, Ukrainian SSR
- Height: 1.76 m (5 ft 9 in)
- Position: Defender

Youth career
- Lutsk sports school

Senior career*
Years	Team	Apps	(Gls)
1982–1984	Torpedo Lutsk	5	(0)
1982–1995	FC Prylad Lutsk		
1987	FC Pidshypnyk Lutsk		
1987–1995	Dnipro Cherkasy	320	(4)
1995–1996	Naftovyk Okhtyrka	18	(0)
1996	Verkhovyna Uzhhorod	19	(1)
1997	FC Cherkasy	3	(0)

Managerial career
- 1997–1999: Dnipro Cherkasy (assistant)
- 1999–2001: FC Dnipro Cherkasy
- 2001: FC Dnipro Cherkasy (assistant)
- 2002–2003: FC Dnipro Cherkasy
- 2003: FC Volga Tver (assistant)
- 2004–2005: FC Zlatokrai Zolotonosha
- 2006–2007: FC Dnipro-2 Cherkasy
- 2007–2009: FC Khodak Cherkasy
- 2010–2012: FC Slavutych Cherkasy
- 2013: FC Retro Vatutine
- 2013–2016: FC Cherkaskyi Dnipro (sports director)
- 2016: FC Cherkaskyi Dnipro
- 2017: FC Cherkaskyi Dnipro
- 2018–2019: FC Cherkashchyna-Akademiya Bilozirya
- * Club domestic league appearances and goals

Oleksandr Kyrylyuk (Ukrainian: Олександр Ілліч Кирилюк; born 28 September 1964) is a Ukrainian former football player and coach.

== Career ==
Kyrylyuk was born in Lutsk, Ukrainian SSR. He worked as a manager of FC Cherkaskyi Dnipro, previously known as Dnipro Cherkasy and other club in Cherkasy Oblast. He also played extensively for Dnipro Cherkasy.

Kyrylyuk returned Dnipro Cherkasy in 1987 when it was revived in KFK competitions under the name of Dnipro Heronymivka and stayed with it for the next eight years. That year Dnipro won the KFK competitions and were admitted to the Soviet Second League under the name of Dnipro Cherkasy.

In 2010, he also became the first coach of the once revived Dnipro Cherkasy, now under the name of Slavutych.
