= Kostyantyn Cherniy =

Ukrainian footballer

Personal information
- Full name: Kostyantyn Mykhaylovych Cherniy
- Date of birth: 17 August 1992 (age 34)
- Place of birth: Nova Kakhovka, Ukraine
- Height: 1.92 m (6 ft 4 in)
- Position: Centre-forward

Team information
- Current team: Vakhsh Bokhtar
- Number: 88

Youth career
- 2003–2007: Enerhiya Nova Kakhovka
- 2008–2009: Shturm Kostopil
- 2009: Horyzont Kostopil
- 2009: Shturm Kostopil

Senior career*
| Years | Team | Apps | (Gls) |
| 2010 | Tavriya Nova Kakhovka | 1 | (0) |
| 2011 | Stakhanov | 0 | (0) |
| 2011–2012 | Illichivets Mariupol | 0 | (0) |
| 2011–2012 | → Illichivets-2 Mariupol | 18 | (0) |
| 2012–2013 | Stal Dniprodzerzhynsk | 21 | (1) |
| 2013–2014 | Enerhiya Nova Kakhovka | 27 | (4) |
| 2014–2016 | Kremin Kremenchuk | 58 | (22) |
| 2016–2017 | Naftovyk-Ukrnafta Okhtyrka | 27 | (4) |
| 2017–2018 | Hirnyk-Sport Horishni Plavni | 19 | (1) |
| 2018–2019 | Kremin Kremenchuk | 28 | (20) |
| 2019 | Valmiera | 2 | (0) |
| 2019–2020 | Metalurh Zaporizhzhia | 25 | (2) |
| 2020–2021 | Kryvbas Kryvyi Rih | 21 | (10) |
| 2021–2022 | Obolon Kyiv | 16 | (3) |
| 2022 | Polonia Przemyśl | 17 | (11) |
| 2022–2023 | KSZO Ostrowiec Świętokrzyski | 30 | (17) |
| 2023–2024 | Olimpia Grudziądz | 24 | (6) |
| 2024–2025 | Polonia Lidzbark Warmiński | 32 | (14) |
| 2025– | Vakhsh Bokhtar | 11 | (3) |
- * Club domestic league appearances and goals as of 16 March 2026

Kostyantyn Mykhaylovych Cherniy (Ukrainian: Костянтин Михайлович Черній; born 17 August 1992) is a Ukrainian professional footballer who plays as a centre-forward for Tajik club Vakhsh Bokhtar.

== Honours ==
KSZO Ostrowiec

- Polish Cup (Świętokrzyskie regionals): 2022–23
