= Andriy Nesteruk =

Ukrainian footballer

Personal information
- Date of birth: 1 August 1978 (age 48)
- Place of birth: Ivano-Frankivsk, Ukrainian SSR
- Height: 1.80 m (5 ft 11 in)
- Position: Forward

Senior career*
Years	Team	Apps	(Gls)
1995–1996	FC Prykarpattya Ivano-Frankivsk		
1996	FC Khutrovyk Tysmenytsia		
1997–1999	FC Kalush		
1999–2000	FC Sheriff Tiraspol		
2000–2001	Haiduc-Sporting-USM Hînceşti		
2001	FC Constructorul Cioburciu		
2002–2004	FC Sheriff Tiraspol		
2004–2005	FC Tiraspol		
2005	FC Tavria Simferopil		
2006	FC Stal Alchevsk		
2007	FC Zakarpattia Uzhhorod		
2007	FC Ordabasy		
2008	FC Prykarpattya Ivano-Frankivsk		
2011	FC Prykarpattya Ivano-Frankivsk		

Managerial career
- 2019: FC Kalush (caretaker)
- * Club domestic league appearances and goals

Andriy Nesteruk (born 1 August 1978) is a retired Ukrainian football striker.
