= Anatoliy Kretov =

Ukrainian footballer (born 1976)

Personal information
- Full name: Anatoli Viktorovich Kretov
- Date of birth: 22 July 1976 (age 50)
- Place of birth: Makiivka, Ukrainian SSR, Soviet Union
- Height: 1.78 m (5 ft 10 in)
- Position: Midfielder

Senior career*
Years	Team	Apps	(Gls)
1995	FC Irtysh Tobolsk	6	(0)
1996	FC Samotlor-XXI Nizhnevartovsk	7	(0)
1997–1998	FC Metalurh Komsomolske	15	(0)
1998–1999	FC Spartak Lukhovitsy	19	(3)
2000–2001	FC Oskil Kupiansk	15	(1)
2001–2002	Jakobstads Bollklubb	35	(3)
2003	GBK Kokkola	24	(1)
2003–2008	Naftovyk-Ukrnafta Okhtyrka	130	(4)
2009	TUS Terjärv	?	(8)
- * Club domestic league appearances and goals

Anatoli Viktorovich Kretov (Russian: Анатолий Викторович Кретов; Ukrainian: Анатолій Вікторович Кретов; born 22 July 1976) is a retired Russian football midfielder. He also holds Ukrainian citizenship.

Kretov played in the Ukrainian Premier League with FC Naftovyk-Ukrnafta Okhtyrka.
