= Serhiy Shevchenko (footballer, born 1958) =

Ukrainian footballer (1958–2024)

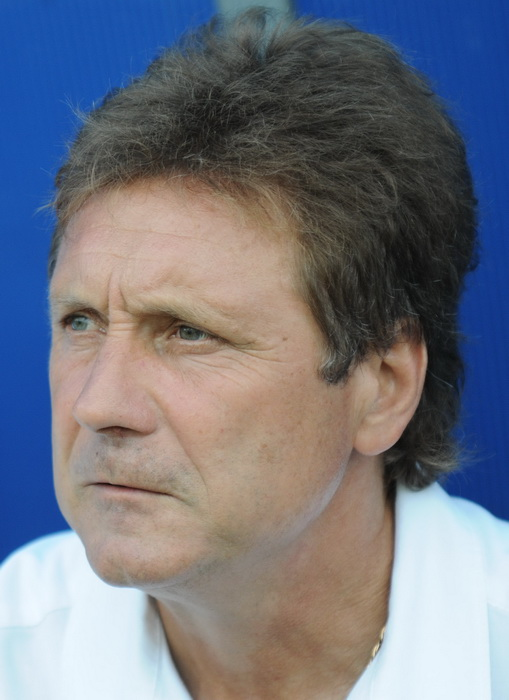
- Shevchenko in 2010

Personal information
- Full name: Serhiy Vasylyovych Shevchenko
- Date of birth: 4 March 1958
- Place of birth: Kherson, Ukrainian SSR, USSR
- Date of death: 23 March 2024 (aged 66)
- Place of death: Yalta, AR Crimea, Ukraine
- Position: Striker

Senior career*
| Years | Team | Apps | (Gls) |
| 1976 | Krystal Kherson | 1 | (0) |
| 1978 | Iskra Voznesensk | | |
| 1979 | Krystal Kherson | 42 | (3) |
| 1980–1984 | Sudnobudivnyk Mykolayiv | 53 | (16) |
| 1985–1986 | Grănicerul Glodeni | | |
| 1987–1988 | Zaria Bălți | 48 | (3) |
| 1989 | Krystal Kherson | | |
| 1990 | Tavria Novotroitske | | |
| 1991 | Frehat Pervomaisk | | (1) |
| 1992 | Meliorator Kakhovka | 33 | (6) |

Managerial career
- 1992–1995: Meliorator Kakhovka
- 1995–1999: Krystal Kherson
- 2001–2007: Naftovyk-Ukrnafta Okhtyrka
- 2007–2009: Ihroservice Simferopol
- 2009–2010: Naftovyk-Ukrnafta Okhtyrka
- 2010: Sevastopol
- 2011–2014: Tavriya Simferopol (assistant)
- 2014–2016: TSK Simferopol
- 2016: Sakhalin Yuzhno-Sakhalinsk (assistant)
- 2016–2020: Tavriya Simferopol
- 2021: Mykolaiv
- 2023–2024: Fregat Kherson
- * Club domestic league appearances and goals

Serhiy Vasylyovych Shevchenko (Ukrainian: Сергій Васильович Шевченко; 4 March 1958 – 23 March 2024) was a Soviet and Ukrainian football player who played as a striker. After his retirement, Shevchenko was a coach. Following the Russian aggression against Ukraine in 2014, he collaborated with the Russian occupational administration. He died on 23 March 2024, at the age of 66.
