= Taras Ilnytskyi =

Ukrainian footballer (born 1983)

Personal information
- Date of birth: 4 March 1983 (age 43)
- Place of birth: Burshtyn, Ukraine, Soviet Union
- Height: 1.82 m (5 ft 11 1/2 in)
- Position: Defender

Team information
- Current team: Sokół Sieniawa (manager)

Youth career
- 1999–2000: Dynamo Kyiv

Senior career*
Years	Team	Apps	(Gls)
1999	Enerhetyk Burshtyn	4	(1)
1999–2002	Dynamo Kyiv	0	(0)
1999–2002	→ Dynamo-3 Kyiv	52	(0)
2000–2002	→ Dynamo-2 Kyiv	20	(1)
2002–2003	CSKA Kyiv	31	(0)
2003–2006	Zakarpattia Uzhhorod	83	(0)
2006–2007	Arsenal Kyiv	30	(0)
2007–2008	Tavriya Simferopol	28	(1)
2009	Arsenal Kyiv	2	(0)
2013	Zhemchuzhyna Yalta	5	(0)

Managerial career
- 2014–2016: Dynamo Kyiv (youth)
- 2016: Arsenal Kyiv U19
- 2018–2020: Chaika Petropavlivska Borshchahivka
- 2020: LNZ Cherkasy (assistant)
- 2021–2022: Dnipro Cherkasy
- 2022–2023: Wisła Czarny Dunajec (youth)
- 2023–2024: Polonia Przemyśl
- 2025: Sanoczanka Święte
- 2025–: Sokół Sieniawa
- * Club domestic league appearances and goals

Taras Ilnytskyi (Ukrainian: Тарас Іванович Ільницький; born 4 March 1983) is a Ukrainian football manager and former player who played as a defender. He is currently in charge of Polish club Sokół Sieniawa.

== Playing career ==
Born in Burshtyn in Prykarpattia, Ilnytskyi is a product of Dynamo Kyiv's academy. He made his first professional appearances of his career playing for his hometown club Enerhetyk Burshtyn. He made his Ukrainian Premier League debut with Zakarpattia Uzhhorod in 2004, with whom he earned promotion in the previous season. He continued playing in the Ukrainian top-flight until 2009 for Zakarapattia, Arsenal Kyiv and Tavriya Simferopol.

In 2013, Ilnytskyi returned to professional football and joined Crimean club Zhemchuzhyna Yalta, before retiring shortly after.

== Managerial career ==
In summer of 2014, Ilnytskyi joined Dynamo Kyiv's academy as a coach. In 2016, Ilnytskyi became head coach of Arsenal Kyiv's under-19 team. From October 2018 to 2020, he managed Chaika Petropavlivska Borshchahivka.

In 2019, Ilnytskyi was distinguished with the Ukrainian Second League coach of the round honour.

On 17 July 2023, Ilnytskyi was appointed manager of Polish IV liga side Polonia Przemyśl. He was dismissed on 30 April 2024, with the team placed 16th out of 18.

In February 2025, Ilnytskyi was hired as head coach of Polish regional league club Sanoczanka Święte. On 23 December 2025, he was appointed manager of fellow regional league side Sokół Sieniawa.
