= 2021–22 Ukrainian Cup =

Tournament details
- Country: Ukraine
- Dates: 4 August 2021 — February 2022 (abandoned); 4 August 2021–31 August 2021 (preliminary rounds); 21 September 2021–11 May 2022 (main event)
- Teams: 65

Final positions
- Champions: None
- Runners-up: None

Tournament statistics
- Matches played: 57
- Goals scored: 174 (3.05 per match)
- Attendance: 110,820 (1,944 per match)
- Top goal scorer(s): Serhiy Kravchenko; Stanislav Kulish; Danylo Kondrakov (3 goals)
- All statistics correct as of 1 December 2021.

The 2021–22 Ukrainian Cup was the 31st annual season of Ukraine's football knockout competition. The competition began on 4 August 2021 and was expected to conclude on 11 May 2022 with the final. Just before the start, the Ukrainian Association of Football announced that the new competition sponsor is a betting company, VBet, the same as for the Ukrainian Premier League. Dynamo Kyiv were the two-time defending winners.

All competition rounds consist of a single game, with home-field advantage granted to a team from a lower league. The draw for all the rounds was blind. Qualification for the competition was granted to all professional clubs and two better of the 2020–21 Ukrainian Amateur Cup. Higher-tier teams enter the competition later (gain bye) than lower-tier teams.

Due to the Russian full-scale invasion of Ukraine in late February of 2022, the quarterfinals games were suspended at first. At an extraordinary general meeting on 26 April 2022, the competition was abandoned due to the Russian invasion of Ukraine.

== Team allocation and schedule ==
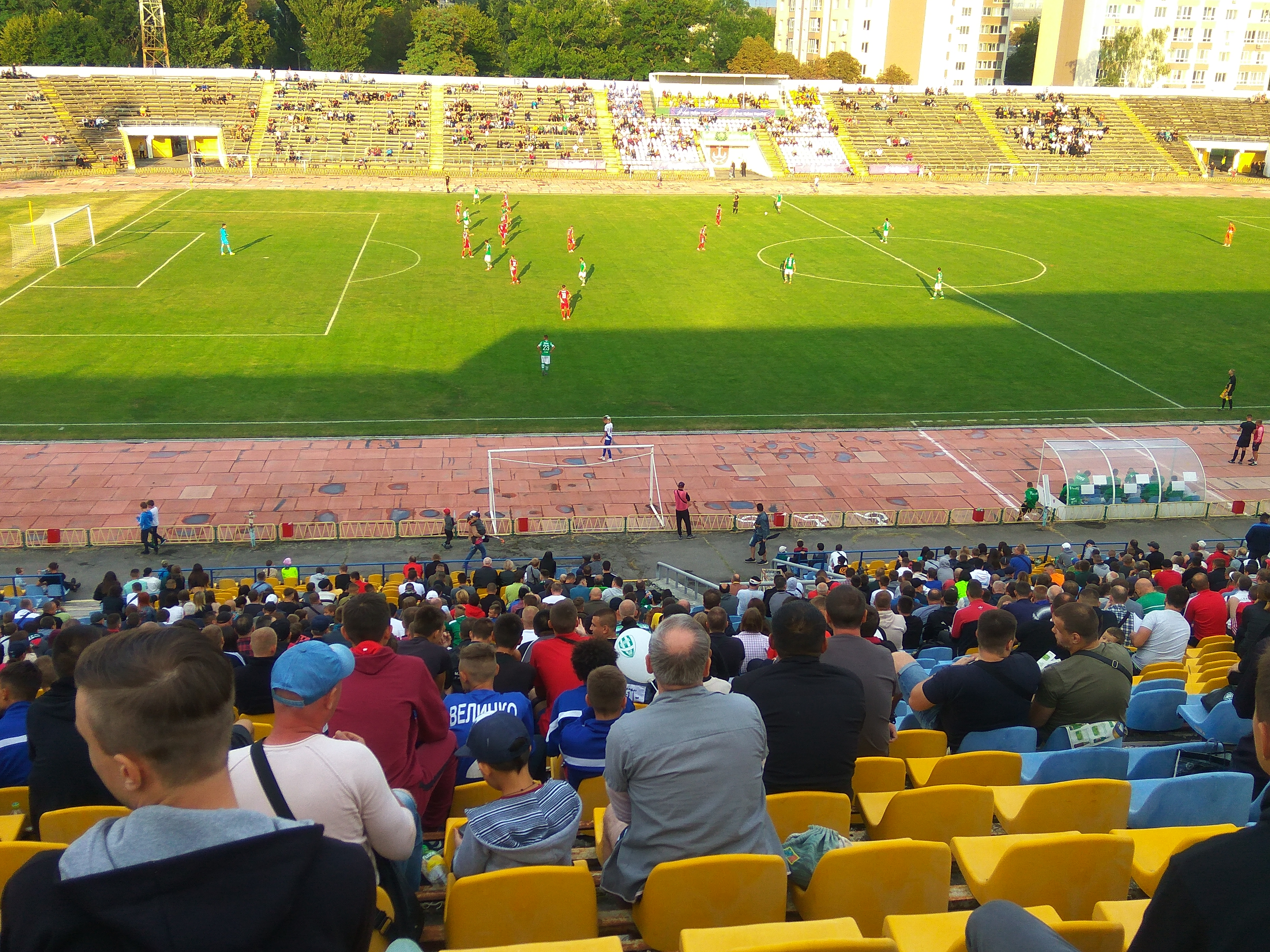
The Second preliminary round game in Vinnytsia, Nyva versus Volyn

The competition includes all professional first teams from the Premier League (16/16 teams of the league), First League (16/16), Second League (31/31) and two semifinal teams from the previous year's Amateur Cup since two other semifinal teams joined ranks of the Second League including the winner LNZ Cherkasy.

Distribution
	Teams entering in this round	Teams advancing from previous round
First preliminary round (10 teams)	8 entrants from the Second League; 2 semifinalists of the 2020–21 Amateur Cup	
Second preliminary round (44 teams)	16 entrants from the First League; 23 entrants from the Second League	5 winners from the First preliminary round
Third preliminary round (22 teams)		22 winners from the Second preliminary round
Round of 32 (22 teams)	11 entrants from the Premier League	11 winners from the Third preliminary round
Round of 16 (16 teams)	5 entrants from the Premier League	11 winners from the Round of 32

=== Rounds schedule ===
Phase	Round	Fractional	Draw date	Game date	Number of fixtures	Clubs remaining	New entries this round
Preliminary	First round	1/128 finals	27 July 2021	4 August 2021	5	65 → 60	10
Preliminary	Second round	1/64 finals	6 August 2021	17–18 August 2021	22	60 → 38	39
Preliminary	Third round	1/32 finals	19 August 2021	31 August 2021	11	38 → 27	None
Main event	Round of 32	1/16 finals	3 September 2021	21–23 September 2021	11	27 → 16	11
Main event	Round of 16	1/8 finals	24 September 2021	26–28 October 2021	8	16 → 8	5
Main event	Quarter-finals	1/4 finals	28 October 2021	2 March 2022	4	8 → 4	None
Main event	Semi-finals	1/2 finals	3 March 2022	20 April 2022	2	4 → 2	None
Main event	Final at TBA		3 March 2022	11 May 2022	1	2 → 1	None

=== Teams ===
Enter in First Round		Enter in Second Round		Enter in Fourth Round	Enter in Round of 16
AAFU; 2/2 teams	PFL League 2; 8/31 teams	PFL League 2; 23/31 teams	PFL League1; 16/16 teams	UPL; 11/16 teams	UPL; 5/16 teams
Feniks Pidmonastyr*; Olympia Savyntsi	AFSC Kyiv*; Karpaty Lviv*; Livyi Bereh Kyiv*; Lyubomyr Stavyshche*; MFA Mukachevo*; SC Poltava*; Skoruk Tomakivka*; FC Trostianets*	Balkany Zorya; Bukovyna Chernivtsi; Chaika Petropavlivska Borshchahivka; FC Chernihiv; Dinaz Vyshhorod; Dnipro Cherkasy; Enerhiya Nova Kakhovka; Epitsentr Dunaivtsi; Karpaty Halych; Krystal Kherson; LNZ Cherkasy*; Metalurh Zaporizhia; MFC Mykolaiv; FC Nikopol; Nyva Vinnytsia; Peremoha Dnipro; Real Pharma Odesa; Rubikon Kyiv; FC Sumy*; Tavriya Simferopol; Viktoriya Mykolaivka*; FC Vovchansk*; Yarud Mariupol	Ahrobiznes Volochysk; Alians Lypova Dolyna; Hirnyk-Sport; FC Kramatorsk; Kremin Kremenchuk; Kryvbas Kryvyi Rih; Metalist Kharkiv; Nyva Ternopil; Obolon Kyiv; Olimpik Donetsk; Podillya Khmelnytskyi; Polissya Zhytomyr; Prykarpattia Ivano-Frankivsk; FC Uzhhorod; Volyn Lutsk; VPK-Ahro Shevchenkivka	Chornomorets Odesa; Desna Chernihiv; SC Dnipro-1; Inhulets Petrove; FC Lviv; FC Mariupol; Metalist 1925 Kharkiv; FC Mynai; FC Oleksandriya; Rukh Lviv; Veres Rivne	Dynamo Kyiv; Kolos Kovalivka; Shakhtar Donetsk; Vorskla Poltava; Zorya Luhansk

Notes:

- With the asterisk (*) are noted the Second League teams that were recently admitted to the league from amateurs and the AAFU (amateur) team(s) that qualified in place of the Amateur Cup finalist(s).
- Since the winner of the 2020–21 Ukrainian Amateur Cup LNZ Cherkasy was admitted to the 2021–22 Ukrainian Second League becoming professional, it qualified for the Ukrainian Cup as the professional club, so its qualification spot through Ukrainian Amateur Cup quota was filled by one of semi-finalists of the 2020–21 Ukrainian Amateur Cup, Feniks Pidmonastyr.

== Competition schedule ==
Legends: AM – AAFU (amateur) competitions (IV tier), 2L – Second League (III tier), 1L – First League (II tier), PL – Premier League (I tier)

=== First preliminary round (1/128) ===
In this round, 8 clubs from the Second League and 2 semifinalists of the 2020–21 Ukrainian Amateur Cup entered the competition.

The draw was held on 27 July 2021.

4 August 2021	Feniks Pidmonastyr (AM)	2–0	(2L) MFA Mukachevo	Pidmonastyr, Lviv Oblast
15:00	Feshchuk 54' (pen.); Hnativ 74'	Report		Stadium: Feniks Arena; Attendance: 400; Referee: I. Vakulenko (Rivne)

4 August 2021	Olimpiya Savyntsi (AM)	6–0	(2L) Lyubomyr Stavyshche	Poltava
17:00	Fabunmi 6'; Tyshchenko 28', 35'; Kirpichenko 48', 53'; Burlyai 72'	Report		Stadium: Lokomotyv Stadium; Attendance: 200; Referee: O. Khamkhodera (Kharkiv)

4 August 2021	Skoruk Tomakivka (2L)	1–0	(2L) Trostianets	Nikopol, Dnipropetrovsk Oblast
17:00	Malysh 70'	Report		Stadium: Elektrometalurh Stadium; Attendance: 500; Referee: K. Usova (Kyiv Oblast)

4 August 2021	Karpaty Lviv (2L)	3–0	(2L) AFSC Kyiv	Lviv
18:00	Halenkov 77'; Chachua 85'; Yermachenko 90'	Report		Stadium: Ukraina Stadium; Attendance: 5,500; Referee: M. Firsov (Rivne)

4 August 2021	Livyi Bereh Kyiv (2L)	1–0 (a.e.t.)	(2L) Poltava	Hnidyn, Kyiv Oblast
18:00	Buzhyn 102' (o.g.)	Report		Stadium: Livyj Bereh; Attendance: 300; Referee: Y. Nazarov (Kharkiv)

=== Second preliminary round (1/64) ===
In this round, 16 clubs from the First League and 23 clubs from the Second League enter the competition and join the 5 winners of the First preliminary round (3 clubs from Second League, 2 – amateurs).

The draw was held on 6 August 2021.

17 August 2021	Skoruk Tomakivka (2L)	4–2	(2L) Viktoriya Mykolaivka	Nikopol, Dnipropetrovsk Oblast
17:00	Tsybulskyi 4' (pen.); Bozhenar 45'; Zhukov 53'; Nelin 77' (o.g.)	Report	Arzhanov 24' (pen.); Yeremenko 30'	Stadium: Elektrometalurh Stadium; Referee: V.Bakulin (Nova Kakhovka)

18 August 2021	Feniks Pidmonastyr (AM)	2–6	(1L) Prykarpattia Ivano-Frankivsk	Lviv
16:00	Derevlyov 25'; Babatunde 72'	Report	Barchuk 3'; Semotyuk 6' (pen.); Voloshynovych 23'; Pysko 75', 89'; Vorobchak 79'	Stadium: Skif Stadium; Attendance: 500; Referee: V.Malyar (Khmelnytskyi)

18 August 2021	Sumy (2L)	0–1	(2L) Metalurh Zaporizhzhia	Mykolaivka, Sumy Oblast
16:00		Report	Sydorov 28'	Stadium: Stadion Viktoriya; Attendance: 100; Referee: D.Osaulenko (Kyiv)

18 August 2021	Tavriya Simferopol (2L)	3–2	(2L) Dnipro Cherkasy	Marianivka, Kherson Oblast
16:00	Barladym 16'; Boyko 29'; Kryvych 40'	Report	Savisko 18'; Chyzhyk 24'	Stadium: Stadion Marianivskyi; Attendance: 350; Referee: D.Fedan (Oleksandriya)

18 August 2021	Epitsentr Dunaivtsi (2L)	3–0	(1L) Podillya Khmelnytskyi	Dunaivtsi, Khmelnytskyi Oblast
17:00	Kitsak 8'; Bezhenar 68'; Buy 80' (pen.)	Report		Stadium: Stadion Kolos; Attendance: 380; Referee: O.Kalyonov (Ivano-Frankivsk)

18 August 2021	Uzhhorod (1L)	0–1	(1L) Nyva Ternopil	Uzhhorod
17:00		Report	Vovchenko 54'	Stadium: Avanhard Stadium; Attendance: 300; Referee: A.Kashura (Chernivtsi)

18 August 2021	Chaika Petropavlivska Borshchahivka (2L)	1–1 (a.e.t.) (3–5 p)	(2L) Chernihiv	Makariv, Kyiv Oblast
17:00	Lakeyenko 76' (o.g.)	Report	Porokhnya 12'; Chaus (penalty missed) 14'	Stadium: Tsentralnyi Stadion im.Brukvenka; Attendance: 250; Referee: V.Faida (Lviv)
	Penalties
	Pohranichnyi (penalty missed); Potopalskyi (penalty scored); Dovhyi (penalty scored); Nivaldo (penalty scored)		(penalty scored) Borshch; (penalty scored) Porokhnya; (penalty scored) Zenchenko; (penalty scored) Shumylo; (penalty scored) Kryvoborodenko

18 August 2021	Yarud Mariupol (2L)	1–3	(1L) Metalist Kharkiv	Mariupol, Donetsk Oblast
17:00	Mochevinskyi (Note: The match report from UAF has his name spelled as MochevYnskyi, yet the UAF database "FootPass" has his name as MochevInskyi, the same spelling is posted at the PFL website.) 55'	Report	Jô 1', 23'; Shamych 74'	Stadium: Zakhidnyi Stadium; Attendance: 700; Referee: K.Zabroda (Kyiv)

18 August 2021	Olimpiya Savyntsi (AM)	0–1	(2L) Vovchansk	Poltava
17:00		Report	Pets 81' (pen.)	Stadium: Lokomotyv Stadium; Attendance: 300; Referee: R.Dubyna (Dnipro)

18 August 2021	Peremoha Dnipro (2L)	1–2	(1L) Hirnyk-Sport Horishni Plavni	Dnipro
17:00	Valeyev 55'	Report	Kozhevnikov 9'; Ponedelnik 45'	Stadium: Stadion Olimpiyski Rezervy; Attendance: 250; Referee: Ya.Piesotskyi (Sumy)

18 August 2021	Nikopol (2L)	2–0	(2L) Krystal Kherson	Nikopol, Dnipropetrovsk Oblast
17:00	Homenko 80'; Hora 86'	Report		Stadium: Elektrometalurh Stadium; Attendance: 400; Referee: Ye.Makarenko (Cherkasy)

18 August 2021	Real Pharma Odesa (2L)	0–2	(1L) VPK-Ahro Shevchenkivka	Odesa
17:00		Report	Kulish 25', 51'	Stadium: Ivan Stadium; Attendance: 200; Referee: K.Kozoroh (Kyiv Oblast)

18 August 2021	Balkany Zorya (2L)	4–2	(2L) Enerhiya Nova Kakhovka	Zorya, Odesa Oblast
17:00	Serdenyuk 51'; Hezelo 68' (o.g.); Vadym Zlatov 90+4'; Prybluda 90+5'	Report	Bondar 7' (pen.); Fedorov 37'	Stadium: Stadion im.B.Tropantsia; Attendance: 400; Referee: M.Polishchuk (Kryvyi Rih)

18 August 2021	Mykolaiv (2L)	1–1 (a.e.t.) (3–1 p)	(1L) Kryvbas Kryvyi Rih	Mykolaiv
17:00	Kravchenko 75'	Report	Govedarica 51'	Stadium: Central City Stadium; Attendance: 555; Referee: O.Afanasiev (Kharkiv)
	Penalties
	Roslyakov (penalty missed); Masalov (penalty scored); Studenko (penalty missed); Kravchenko (penalty scored); Holubka (penalty scored)		(penalty missed) Semenov; (penalty missed) Khoblenko; (penalty scored) Malinovskyi; (penalty missed) Shchedryi

18 August 2021	Bukovyna Chernivtsi (2L)	2–0 (a.e.t.)	(1L) Ahrobiznes Volochysk	Chernivtsi
17:30	Palahnyuk 99'; Ornat 119'	Report	Verbnyi (penalty missed) 64'	Stadium: Bukovyna Stadium; Attendance: 1,100; Referee: S.Lapko (Lviv)

18 August 2021	Dinaz Vyshhorod (2L)	1–3	(1L) Obolon Kyiv	Demydiv, Kyiv Oblast
17:30	Pokotylyuk 32' (o.g.)	Report	Murza 18'; Cherniy 19'; Savchenko 59'	Stadium: Stadion Dinaz; Attendance: 280; Referee: Ye.Tsybulko (Cherkasy Oblast)

18 August 2021	Nyva Vinnytsia (2L)	1–1 (a.e.t.) (3–5 p)	(1L) Volyn Lutsk	Vinnytsia
17:30	Zahorulko (penalty missed) 4'; Zelenevych 89'	Report	Bohomaz 14' (pen.)	Stadium: Central City Stadium; Referee: S.Zadyran (Kyiv Oblast)
	Penalties
	Serbul (penalty scored); Boryachuk (penalty scored); Heorhiyev (penalty missed); Braslavskyi (penalty scored)		(penalty scored) Sad; (penalty scored) Kuznyechikov; (penalty scored) Teslyuk; (penalty scored) Chepelyuk; (penalty scored) Kobzar

18 August 2021	Karpaty Lviv (2L)	1–0	(2L) Karpaty Halych	Lviv
18:00	Humenyuk 57'	Report		Stadium: Ukraina Stadium; Attendance: 7,700; Referee: P.Dubrovets (Zhytomyr)

18 August 2021	Rubikon Kyiv (2L)	0–5	(1L) Polissya Zhytomyr	Shchaslyve, Kyiv Oblast
18:00		Report	Hrytsuk 23' (pen.); Kozak 36', 88'; Hlahola 40'; Shvets 45+5' (pen.)	Stadium: Arsenal Arena; Attendance: 200; Referee: O.Shandor (Lviv)

18 August 2021	Livyi Bereh Kyiv (2L)	2–3	(1L) Olimpik Donetsk	Hnidyn, Kyiv Oblast
18:00	Pinchuk 6'; Akymenko 90+1'	Report	Pryadun 16'; Bilyi 30' (pen.); Gbamblé 53'	Stadium: Stadion Livyi Bereh; Attendance: 800; Referee: D.Yevtukhov (Dnipro)

18 August 2021	Alians Lypova Dolyna (1L)	2–1	(1L) Kramatorsk	Sumy
18:00	Sharay 29'; Shmyhelskyi 31'	Report	Hunichev 4'	Stadium: Yuvileiny Stadium; Attendance: 1,150; Referee: D.Reznikov (Kamianske)

18 August 2021	LNZ Cherkasy (2L)	1–0	(1L) Kremin Kremenchuk	Cherkasy
19:00	Halenko 71'	Report		Stadium: Cherkasy Arena; Attendance: 800; Referee: I.Bych (Kyiv)

=== Third preliminary round (1/32) ===
In this round participate the 22 winners of the Second preliminary round (10 clubs from First League, 12 – Second League).

The draw was held on 19 August 2021.

31 August 2021	Epitsentr Dunaivtsi (2L)	1–0	(1L) Nyva Ternopil	Dunaivtsi, Khmelnytskyi Oblast
	Claudinei 28'	Report		Stadium: Stadion Kolos; Attendance: 1,050; Referee: I.Bych (Kyiv)

31 August 2021	Bukovyna Chernivtsi (2L)	1–1 (a.e.t.) (2–4 p)	(1L) Prykarpattia Ivano-Frankivsk	Chernivtsi
	Salback 58'	Report	Tsyutsyura 33'	Stadium: Bukovyna Stadium; Attendance: 1,650; Referee: S.Zadyran (Kyiv Oblast)
	Penalties
	Palahnyuk (penalty scored); Ella (penalty missed); Lohinov (penalty scored); Ornat (penalty missed)		(penalty scored) Barchuk; (penalty scored) Semotyuk; (penalty scored) Kuzmyn; (penalty scored) Vorobchak

31 August 2021	Karpaty Lviv (2L)	2–3 (a.e.t.)	(1L) Volyn Lutsk	Lviv
	Kozhanov 90+3'; Halenkov 111'	Report	Sasovskyi 56'; Lyashenko 94'; Kuznyechikov 107'	Stadium: Ukraina Stadium; Attendance: 4,400; Referee: Yu.Ivanov (Donetsk Oblast)

31 August 2021	LNZ Cherkasy (2L)	2–1	(1L) Olimpik Donetsk	Cherkasy
	Storchous 74'; Halenko 89'	Report	Bilyi 63' (pen.)	Stadium: Cherkasy Arena; Attendance: 1,400; Referee: O.Kalyonov (Ivano-Frankivsk)

31 August 2021	Obolon Kyiv (1L)	1–0	(1L) Polissya Zhytomyr	Kyiv
	Shchebetun 65'	Report		Stadium: Obolon Arena; Attendance: 790; Referee: M.Kozyriatskyi (Zaporizhia)

31 August 2021	Chernihiv (2L)	1–5	(1L) Alians Lypova Dolyna	Chernihiv
	Porokhnya 86'	Report	Karnoza 14'; Sharay 33'; Ahapov 82'; Zahynaylov 89'; Pidnebennoy 90+4'	Stadium: Chernihiv Arena; Attendance: 170; Referee: A.Mykhailyuk (Kyiv)

31 August 2021	Nikopol (2L)	0–3	(2L) Tavriya Simferopol	Nikopol, Dnipropetrovsk Oblast
		Report	Kovalyov 12', 47'; Bilokin 83'	Stadium: Elektrometalurh Stadium; Attendance: 550; Referee: K.Kozoroh (Kyiv Oblast)

31 August 2021	Balkany Zorya (2L)	1–3 (a.e.t.)	(1L) VPK-Ahro Shevchenkivka	Zorya, Odesa Oblast
	Pryyomov 90+3'	Report	Budnyak 49'; Kulish 94'; Vicente 99'	Stadium: Stadion im.Tropantsia; Attendance: 600; Referee: K.Usova (Kyiv Oblast)

31 August 2021	Metalurh Zaporizhzhia (2L)	2–3	(1L) Hirnyk-Sport Horishni Plavni	Zaporizhzhia
	Mohylnyi 19', 29'	Report	Yampol 32' (pen.); Yavorskyi 34', 51'	Stadium: Slavutych-Arena; Attendance: 1,277; Referee: D.Yevtukhov (Dnipro)

1 September 2021	Skoruk Tomakivka (2L)	0–3	(1L) Metalist Kharkiv	Nikopol, Dnipropetrovsk Oblast
		Report	Peixoto 14'; Pidlepenets 49'; Demchenko 90+1'	Stadium: Elektrometalurh Stadium; Attendance: 649; Referee: O.Shandor (Lviv)

1 September 2021	Mykolaiv (2L)	4–1	(2L) Vovchansk	Mykolaiv
	Kravchenko 31', 78'; Nechyporenko 61'; Holubka 67' (pen.)	Report	Pets 90+1'	Stadium: Tsentralnyi Miskyi Stadion; Attendance: 300; Referee: Ye.Kievlich (Kropyvnytskyi)

=== Round of 32 ===
In this round, 11 clubs from the Premier League (lower ranked) enter the competition and join the 11 winners of the Third preliminary round (7 clubs from First League, 4 – Second League).

The draw was held on 3 September 2021.

21 September 2021	Mykolaiv (2L)	0–3	(PL) Rukh Lviv	Mykolaiv
17:00		Report	Kondrakov 37', 44' (pen.), 90+3' (pen.)	Stadium: Tsentralnyi Stadion; Attendance: 700; Referee: A.B. Abdula (Kharkiv)

21 September 2021	Metalist Kharkiv (1L)	2–1	(PL) Desna Chernihiv	Kharkiv
19:00	Harris 73'; Myzyuk 88'	Report	Voloshyn 44'	Stadium: OSC Metalist; Attendance: 26,668; Referee: M.O. Balakin (Kyiv Oblast)

22 September 2021	Tavriya Simferopol (2L)	1–3	(PL) Oleksandriya	Marianivka, Kherson Oblast
13:00	Barladym 34' (pen.)	Report	Rybalka 2'; Kozhushko 24'; Demchenko 80' (pen.)	Stadium: Marianivka Stadium; Attendance: 620; Referee: M.S. Kozyrs'kyi (Khmelnytskyi)

22 September 2021	LNZ Cherkasy (2L)	2–1	(PL) Inhulets Petrove	Cherkasy
15:00	Dolinskyi 38'; Storchous 90+3'	Report	Plokhotnyuk 19'	Stadium: Central Stadium; Attendance: 1,400; Referee: O.O. Derevins'kyi (Khmelnytskyi)

22 September 2021	VPK-Ahro Shevchenkivka (1L)	1–2	(PL) Dnipro-1	Dnipro
17:00	Sukhar 77'	Report	Rusyn 37'; Yarmolyuk 50'	Stadium: Meteor Stadium; Attendance: 1,000; Referee: D.I. Panchyshyn (Kharkiv)

22 September 2021	Volyn Lutsk (1L)	0–0 (a.e.t.) (5–6 p)	(PL) Mariupol	Lutsk
17:00		Report		Stadium: Avanhard Stadium; Attendance: 526; Referee: V.M. Romanov (Dnipro)
	Penalties
	Kvasov (penalty missed); Kucherenko (penalty scored); Voytikhovskyi (penalty scored); Klymets (penalty scored); Hagh Nazari (penalty missed); Sasovskyi (penalty scored); Krystin (penalty missed); Chernov (penalty scored); Ryabov (penalty missed)		(penalty scored) Kholod; (penalty missed) Udod; (penalty scored) Mampassi; (penalty scored) Myshnyov; (penalty missed) Viunnyk; (penalty scored) Shostak; (penalty missed) Mykytyshyn; (penalty scored) Khromey

22 September 2021	Obolon Kyiv (1L)	0–1	(PL) Veres Rivne	Kyiv
19:00		Report	Shestakov 81'	Stadium: Obolon Arena; Attendance: 750; Referee: Y.V. Kozyk (Mukachevo)

23 September 2021	Epitsentr Dunaivtsi (2L)	0–1	(PL) Metalist 1925 Kharkiv	Dunaivtsi, Khmelnytskyi Oblast
13:00		Report	Remenyuk 83'	Stadium: Kolos Stadium; Attendance: 1,100; Referee: V.V. Novokhatnyi (Kyiv)

23 September 2021	Hirnyk-Sport Horishni Plavni (1L)	0–2	(PL) Lviv	Horishni Plavni, Poltava Oblast
15:00		Report	Nych 27'; Dovhyi 45+1'	Stadium: Yunist Stadium; Attendance: 450; Referee: D.Y. Bondarenko (Odesa)

23 September 2021	Prykarpattia Ivano-Frankivsk (1L)	1–4	(PL) Chornomorets Odesa	Ivano-Frankivsk
17:00	Kuzmyn 64'	Report	Braharu 11'; Buhay 18', 82'; Isayenko 50'	Stadium: MCS Rukh; Attendance: 2,400; Referee: R.A. Blavatskyi (Lviv)

23 September 2021	Alians Lypova Dolyna (1L)	3–2	(PL) Mynai	Sumy
19:00	Pisnyi 16'; Zahynaylov 42'; Lebedenko 83'	Report	Kobak 6'; Vyshnevskyi 11'	Stadium: Yuvileiny Stadium; Attendance: 3,100; Referee: O.V. Derdo (Chornomorsk)

=== Round of 16 ===
In this round, rest of 5 clubs from the Premier League (upper ranked) enter the competition and join the 11 winners of the Round of 32 (8 clubs from Premier League, 2 – First League, 1 – Second League).

The draw for round of 16 was held on 24 September 2021.

26 October 2021	Metalist 1925 Kharkiv (PL)	2–5	(PL) Oleksandriya	Kharkiv
19:30	Kryskiv 63'; Remenyuk 85'	Report	Mustafayev 24', 29'; Kopyna 52'; Kyryukhantsev 69'; Ustymenko 90+1'	Stadium: OSC Metalist; Attendance: 2,684; Referee: D. Y. Bondarenko (Odesa)

27 October 2021	Veres Rivne (PL)	1–3	(PL) Vorskla Poltava	Lutsk
14:00	Serhiychuk 90+3' (pen.)	Report	Kane 21'; Pešić 66'; Yavorskyi 83'	Stadium: Avanhard Stadium; Attendance: 652; Referee: V. M. Romanov (Dnipro)

27 October 2021	Mariupol (PL)	1–2	(PL) Dynamo Kyiv	Mariupol, Donetsk Oblast
17:00	Ocheretko 85'	Report	Verbič 16'; Shabanov 33'	Stadium: Volodymyr Boyko Stadium; Attendance: 0 (Note: The FC Mariupol – Dynamo Kyiv match was played without any spectators due to the COVID-19 pandemic in Ukraine and the unprecedented rise in infections in Donetsk oblast enacting the government to declare the region a "red zone" and thus issuing restrictions with gatherings.); Referee: A. A. Kovalenko (Poltava)

27 October 2021	Chornomorets Odesa (PL)	0–3	(PL) Shakhtar Donetsk	Odesa
19:30		Report	Fernando 64'; Antônio 72'; Dentinho 81'	Stadium: Chornomorets Stadium; Attendance: 1,472; Referee: O. V. Zhukov (Kharkiv)

28 October 2021	Alians Lypova Dolyna (1L)	1–1 (a.e.t.) (2–3 p)	(PL) Lviv	Sumy
14:00	Karnoza 19'	Report	Busko 13'	Stadium: Yuvileiny Stadium; Attendance: 0 (Note: The FC Alians Lypova Dolynal – FC Lviv match was played without any spectators due to the COVID-19 pandemic in Ukraine and the unprecedented rise in infections in the city of Sumy enacting the government to declare the region a "red zone" and thus issuing restrictions with gatherings.); Referee: O. V. Derdo (Chornomorsk)
	Penalties
	Shmyhelskyi (penalty scored); Osadchyi (penalty missed); Hert (penalty missed); Pikul (penalty scored); Ahapov (penalty missed)		(penalty scored) China; (penalty missed) Politylo; (penalty missed) Sorokin; (penalty scored) Zozulya; (penalty scored) Semeniv

28 October 2021	Rukh Lviv (PL)	0–2 (a.e.t.)	(PL) Zorya Luhansk	Lviv
17:00		Report	Zahedi 100', 110'	Stadium: Skif Stadium; Attendance: 2,500; Referee: V. V. Novokhatnyi (Kyiv)

28 October 2021	Metalist Kharkiv (1L)	1–0	(PL) Kolos Kovalivka	Kharkiv
19:30	Myzyuk 19'	Report		Stadium: OSC Metalist; Attendance: 26,668; Referee: H. O. Serputko (Odesa)

1 December 2021 (Note: The Round of 16 LNZ Cherkasy – SC Dnipro-1 was to be held 28 October 2021 but was postponed due to the coronavirus outbreak in the LNZ Cherkasy team.)	LNZ Cherkasy (2L)	0–2	(PL) Dnipro-1	Dnipro
19:00		Report	Pikhalyonok 18'; Kohut 53'	Stadium: Dnipro-Arena; Referee: R. A. Blavatskyi (Lviv)

=== Quarter-finals ===
This round includes one team from the First League (Metalist Kharkiv) and 7 clubs from the Premier League. Base date for the matches is 1–2–3 March 2022.

The draw for quarter-finals was held on 15 December 2021.

1 March 2022	Metalist Kharkiv (1L)	Cancelled	(PL) Zorya Luhansk	Kharkiv
19:30				Stadium: OSC Metalist

2 March 2022	Oleksandriya (PL)	Cancelled	(PL) Dynamo Kyiv	Oleksandriya, Kirovohrad Oblast
17:00				Stadium: CSC Nika Stadium

2 March 2022	Lviv (PL)	Cancelled	(PL) Shakhtar Donetsk	Lviv
19:30				Stadium: Arena Lviv

3 March 2022	Dnipro-1 (PL)	Cancelled	(PL) Vorskla Poltava	Dnipro
19:30				Stadium: Dnipro-Arena

=== Semi-finals ===
The draw for semi-finals and final was meant be held on 3 March 2022.

20 April 2022	N/A	Cancelled	N/A

20 April 2022	N/A	Cancelled	N/A

=== Final ===
11 May 2022	N/A	Cancelled	N/A

== Top goalscorers ==
The competition's top ten goalscorers including preliminary rounds.

As of 1 December 2021

Rank	Scorer	Team	Goals (Pen.)
1	(Ukraine) Serhiy Kravchenko	Mykolaiv	3
1	(Ukraine) Stanislav Kulish	VPK-Ahro Shevchenkivka	3
1	(Ukraine) Danylo Kondrakov	Rukh Lviv	3 (2)

== See also ==
- 2021–22 Ukrainian Premier League
- 2021–22 Ukrainian First League
- 2021–22 Ukrainian Second League
- 2021–22 Ukrainian Amateur Cup
