= 2021–22 Ukrainian Second League =

Ukrainian Second League
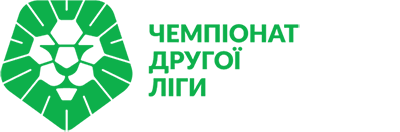
- Season: 2021–22
- Dates: 24 July 2021 – 21 May 2022 (winter break: 29 November 2021 – 25 March 2022)
- Teams: 31
- Champions: no title awarded
- Matches: 150
- Goals: 426 (2.84 per match)
- Top goalscorer: Serhiy Kravchenko (13 goals)
- Biggest home win: Krystal 6–0 Poltava (23 August 2021)
- Biggest away win: Lyubomyr 0–11 Livyi Bereh (8 August 2021)
- Highest scoring: Lyubomyr 0–11 Livyi Bereh (8 August 2021)
- Longest winning run: 9 matches Livyi Bereh Kyiv
- Longest unbeaten run: 10 matches Metalurh Zaporizhia
- Longest winless run: 10 matches Real Pharma Odesa
- Longest losing run: 10 matches Real Pharma Odesa
- Highest attendance: 7,000; Karpaty L. v AFSC (14 August 2021)
- Lowest attendance: 0 Krystal v Vovchansk (26 September 2021)
- Total attendance: 105416
- Average attendance: 703
- All statistics correct as of 27 September 2021.

The 2021–22 Ukrainian Second League was the 31st season since its establishment. The season started on 24 July 2024 and was expected to finish on 21 May 2022. The first game of the season took place on 24 July 2021 (a day before the announced start) in a village of Dertsen, near Mukachevo (Munkacs vs Chernihiv). The last game of the season was played on 28 November 2021 (AFSC vs Chernihiv), before the competition was paused for a winter break. Originally it was expected to be resumed on 26 March 2022, but due to some postponed games the restart was moved to as early as 18 March 2022 (Tavriya vs Mykolaiv).

A month before the season to be resumed, on 24 February 2022, the Russian Federation started a full-scale invasion from Black Sea, the eastern border, and already occupied territories, as well as Belarus. The competition's fate became uncertain. The competition was terminated at the PFL Council meeting on 6 May 2022 due to the 2022 Russian invasion of Ukraine.

== Summary ==
On June 1, 2021, the PFL Central Council adopted a decision that new season competitions in the PFL Second League would start on July 25, 2021, just as competitions in all professional leagues in Ukraine. The competition format and league composition correspond to the PFL program "Strategy of Development" that was adopted back in 2016.

As in the previous season, the top 2 teams from each group get promoted to the First League. There is also expected to be a play-off game.

== Teams ==
=== Promoted teams ===
Twelve teams have been promoted from the 2020–21 Ukrainian Football Amateur League:

- Karpaty Lviv – 4th place of Group 1 (debut, last season original Karpaty Lviv withdrew)
- MFA Mukachevo – 8th place of Group 1 (debut, another club from Mukachevo, Karpaty, last competed in 1996–97)
- Viktoriya Mykolaivka – 1st place of Group 2 (debut)
- LNZ Cherkasy – 2nd place of Group 2 (debut)
- Livyi Bereh Kyiv – 6th place of Group 2 (debut)
- AFSC Kyiv – 9th place of Group 2 (debut)
- Lyubomyr Stavyshche – 10th place of Group 2 (debut)
- Vovchansk – 2nd place of Group 3 (debut)
- Sumy – 3rd place of Group 3 (debut, a phoenix club based on LS Group Sumy Raion with another FC Sumy last competed at this level in 2011–12)
- Skoruk Tomakivka – 4th place of Group 3 (debut)
- SC Poltava – 5th place of Group 3 (debut, another FC Poltava last competed at this level in 2011–12)
- Trostianets – 6th place of Group 3 (debut)

=== Relegated teams ===
Two teams have been relegated from the 2020–21 Ukrainian First League:

- MFC Mykolaiv – 4th place (the club decision to relegate)
- Krystal Kherson – 16th place (returning after a season)

=== Withdrawn and merged teams ===
- Obolon-2 Bucha – withdrawn before the season
- Volyn-2 Lutsk – withdrawn before the season
- MFC Mykolaiv-2 – reserve club withdrew due to parent club relegated
- FC Karpaty Lviv, officially liquidated; the 2020–21 playing and coaching staff joined FC Karpaty Halych

=== Location map ===
The following map displays the location of teams. Group A teams marked in red. Group B teams marked in green.

Home venues of teams in the 2021–22 Ukrainian Second League. SC Tavriya is forced to play its home games outside of Crimea (Autonomous Republic of Crimea).

== Stadiums ==
Group A
Team	Stadium (Note: Minimum capacity of stadium for the Second League is 500 spectators.)	Position in 2020–21
Dinaz Vyshhorod	Dinaz, Demydiv	3rd
Epitsentr Dunaivtsi	Kolos	4th
Karpaty Halych	Rukh, Ivano-Frankivsk	5th
Nyva Vinnytsia	Tsentralnyi Miskyi	6th
Bukovyna Chernivtsi	Bukovyna	7th
Dnipro Cherkasy	Cherkasy Arena	7th, Group B
Chaika	imeni Brukvenka, Makariv	8th
FC Chernihiv	Chernihiv Arena	10th
Rubikon Kyiv	Arsenal Arena, Shchaslyve	11th
LNZ Cherkasy	Cherkasy Arena	Am
Karpaty Lviv	Ukraina	Am
Livyi Bereh Kyiv	Livyi Bereh, Hnidyn	Am
MFA Mukachevo	MFA training field, Dertsen	Am
AFSC Kyiv	Livyi Bereh, Hnidyn	Am
Lyubomyr Stavyshche	Yuvileinyi, Bucha	Am

Group B
Team	Stadium	Position in 2020–21
MFC Mykolaiv	Tsentralnyi	1L
Krystal Kherson	Krystal	1L
Metalurh Zaporizhya	Slavutych-Arena	3rd
Tavriya Simferopol	Marianivskyi (Note: Tavriya Simferopol moved to play their home matches in Marianivka, Kakhovka Raion after merging with Tavriya Novotroitske. All matches will be played in Kherson Oblast of Ukraine due to the Annexation of Crimea by the Russian Federation)	4th
Enerhiya Nova Kakhovka	Enerhiya	5th
Yarud Mariupol	Zakhidnyi	6th
Balkany Zoria	imeni Tropantsia	8th
Peremoha Dnipro	Olimpiyski Rezervy	9th
Real Pharma Odesa	Ivan	10th
FC Nikopol	Elektrometalurh	11th
Viktoriya Mykolaivka	Viktoriya	Am
Sumy	Yuvileiny	Am
Skoruk Tomakivka	Elektrometalurh, Nikopol	Am
SC Poltava	Lokomotyv	Am
Vovchansk	Nova Bavaria (Kharkiv)	Am
Trostianets	imeni Kutsa	Am

== Managers ==
Club	Head coach	Replaced coach
Balkany Zoria	(Ukraine) Denys Kolchin	
Bukovyna Chernivtsi	(Ukraine) Yuriy Kyslytsia (acting)	(Ukraine) Yevhen Kovalenko
Chaika Petropavlivska Borshchahivka	(Ukraine) Vladyslav Savchuk	
FC Chernihiv	(Ukraine) Valeriy Chornyi	
Dinaz Vyshhorod	(Ukraine) Oleksandr Holovko	(Ukraine) Volodymyr Bondarenko
Dnipro Cherkasy	(Ukraine) Taras Ilnytskyi	
Enerhiya Nova Kakhovka	(Ukraine) Eduard Khavrov	
Epitsentr Dunaivtsi	(Ukraine) Oleh Naduda	
Karpaty Halych	(Spain) Carlos Inarejos	(Ukraine) Lyubomyr Vovchuk
Karpaty Lviv	(Ukraine) Andriy Tlumak	
Krystal Kherson	(Ukraine) Yuriy Kulish	
AFSC Kyiv	(Ukraine) Vyacheslav Nivinskyi	
Lyubomyr Stavyshche	(Ukraine) Vadym Lazorenko	(Ukraine) Oleksandr Honcharov
Livyi Bereh Kyiv	(Ukraine) Anatoliy Buznyk	
LNZ Cherkasy	(Ukraine) Yuriy Bakalov	
Metalurh Zaporizhya	(Ukraine) Volodymyr Mykytyn	
MFA Mukachevo	(Ukraine) Vitaliy Shumskyi	
MFC Mykolaiv	(Ukraine) Eduard Pavlov	(Ukraine) Serhiy Shevchenko
FC Nikopol	Vacant	(Ukraine) Oleksandr Poklonskyi
Nyva Vinnytsia	(Ukraine) Ihor Leonov	(Ukraine) Volodymyr Tsytkin
Peremoha Dnipro	(Ukraine) Serhiy Vorobei	
SC Poltava	(Ukraine) Volodymyr Sysenko	
Real Pharma Odesa	(Ukraine) Artem Riazantsev	
Rubikon Kyiv	(Ukraine) Viktor Kuriata	
Skoruk Tomakivka	(Ukraine) Oleksandr Stepanov	
Sumy	(Ukraine) Evgeny Yarovenko	(Ukraine) Valeriy Kutsenko
Tavriya Simferopol	(Ukraine) Yuriy Chumak (interim)	(Ukraine) Serhiy Puchkov
FC Trostianets	(Ukraine) Serhiy Korytnyk	
Viktoriya Mykolaivka	(Ukraine) Volodymyr Romanenko (interim)	(Ukraine) Artem Radionov (Ukraine) Anatoliy Bezsmertnyi
Vovchansk	(Ukraine) Andriy Berezovchuk	
Yarud Mariupol	(Ukraine) Oleh Krasnopyorov	

=== Managerial changes ===
Team	Outgoing head coach	Manner of departure	Date of vacancy	Table	Incoming head coach	Date of appointment	Table
Krystal Kherson	(Ukraine) Vadym Yevtushenko	Resigned	15 June 2021	Pre-season	(Ukraine) Yuriy Kulish	18 July 2021	Pre-season
AFSC Kyiv	(Ukraine) Anatoliy Sidenko	Resigned	16 June 2021	Pre-season	(Ukraine) Vyacheslav Nivinskyi	16 June 2021	Pre-season
FC Dnipro Cherkasy	(Ukraine) Ihor Stolovytskyi	Resigned	12 June 2021	Pre-season	(Ukraine) Taras Ilnytskyi	25 June 2021	Pre-season
Chaika Petropavlivska Borshchahivka	(Ukraine) Vyacheslav Bohodyelov (interim)	End of interim	24 June 2021	Pre-season	(Ukraine) Vladyslav Savchuk	24 June 2021	Pre-season
MFC Mykolaiv	(Ukraine) Illia Blyznyuk	Mutual consent	26 June 2021	Pre-season	(Ukraine) Serhiy Shevchenko	27 June 2021	Pre-season
Epitsentr Dunaivtsi	(Ukraine) Ihor Badlo	Unknown	June 2021	Pre-season	(Ukraine) Oleh Naduda	July 2021	Pre-season
Rubikon Kyiv	(Ukraine) Serhiy Litovchenko	left for Olimpik Donetsk	24 July 2021	Pre-season	(Ukraine) Viktor Kuriata	24 July 2021	Pre-season
Karpaty Halych	(Ukraine) Roman Hnativ	Unknown	25 July 2021	Pre-season	(Ukraine) Lyubomyr Vovchuk	25 July 2021	Pre-season
Lyubomyr Stavyshche	(Ukraine) Oleksandr Honcharov	Undisclosed	8 August 2021	15th	(Ukraine) Vadym Lazorenko	8 August 2021	15th
Tavriya Simferopol	(Ukraine) Serhiy Puchkov	Mutual consent	14 September 2021	12th	(Ukraine) Yuriy Chumak (interim)	14 September 2021	12th
Viktoriya Mykolaivka	(Ukraine) Artem Radionov	Sacked	21 September 2021	10th	(Ukraine) Anatoliy Bezsmertnyi	21 September 2021	10th
Karpaty Halych	(Ukraine) Lyubomyr Vovchuk	Changed position	23 September 2021	8th	(Spain) Carlos Inarejos	23 September 2021	8th
FC Sumy	(Ukraine) Valeriy Kutsenko	Resigned	14 October 2021	15th	(Ukraine) Evgeny Yarovenko	19 January 2022	16th
Bukovyna Chernivtsi	(Ukraine) Yevhen Kovalenko	Resigned	25 October 2021	9th	(Ukraine) Yuriy Kyslytsia (acting)	25 October 2021	9th
MFC Mykolaiv	(Ukraine) Serhiy Shevchenko	Mutual consent	2 November 2021	2nd	(Ukraine) Eduard Pavlov	2 November 2021	2nd
Nyva Vinnytsia	(Ukraine) Volodymyr Tsytkin	Mutual consent	4 November 2021	8th	(Ukraine) Valentyn Vishtaliuk (caretaker)	5 November 2021	8th
Dinaz Vyshhorod	(Ukraine) Volodymyr Bondarenko	Mutual consent	15 December 2021	4th	(Ukraine) Oleksandr Holovko	12 February 2022	4th
FC Nikopol	(Ukraine) Oleksandr Poklonskyi	Moved to VPK-Ahro	25 December 2021	12th			
Nyva Vinnytsia	(Ukraine) Valentyn Vishtaliuk (caretaker)	End of interim	15 January 2022	8th	(Ukraine) Ihor Leonov	15 January 2022	8th
Viktoriya Mykolaivka	(Ukraine) Anatoliy Bezsmertnyi	Moved to Alians Lypova Dolyna	26 January 2022	10th	(Ukraine) Volodymyr Romanenko (interim)	26 January 2022	10th

== Group A ==
Pos	Team	Pld	W	D	L	GF	GA	GD	Pts	Promotion, qualification or relegation
1	Karpaty Lviv	18	16	0	2	46	7	+39	48	Promotion to Ukrainian First League
2	Livyi Bereh Kyiv (Note: Due to Russo-Ukrainian War, Lyubomyr Stavyshche, Karpaty Halych, MFA Mukachevo and Livyi Bereh Kyiv withdrew from competitions after season.)	19	15	1	3	47	14	+33	46	Withdrew after season
3	LNZ Cherkasy	17	13	2	2	36	9	+27	41	Promotion to Ukrainian First League
4	Dinaz Vyshhorod	19	13	1	5	33	18	+15	40	Promotion to Ukrainian First League
5	Epitsentr Dunaivtsi	19	12	1	6	30	19	+11	37	Promotion to Ukrainian First League
6	MFA Mukachevo	19	8	5	6	25	24	+1	29	Withdrew after season
7	Karpaty Halych	18	7	4	7	23	23	0	25 (Note: Karpaty Halych: 3 pts; Nyva: 0 pts)	Withdrew after season
8	Nyva Vinnytsia	17	7	4	6	29	20	+9	25	
9	Bukovyna Chernivtsi	17	6	5	6	20	17	+3	23	Promotion to Ukrainian First League
10	FC Chernihiv	18	5	5	8	17	24	−7	20	Promotion to Ukrainian First League
11	Dnipro Cherkasy	18	5	2	11	24	32	−8	17	Withdrew after season
12	Chaika Petropavlivska Borshchahivka	19	3	6	10	16	40	−24	15	
13	Rubikon Kyiv	18	3	2	13	12	38	−26	11	
14	AFSC Kyiv	19	1	5	13	8	38	−30	8	Withdrew after season
15	Lyubomyr Stavyshche	19	1	1	17	8	51	−43	4	Withdrew after season

Source: PFL.ua
Rules for classification: 1) Points; 2) Head-to-head points; 3) Head-to-head goal difference; 4) Head-to-head goals scored; 5) Goal difference in all games; 6) Goals scored in all games (Note: calculation by criteria indicated in rules 2, 3, 4 is conducted with consideration of all teams that have equal number of tournament points at the moment of calculation and not only among those which after preliminary criteria have appeared more successful).

=== Results ===
Home \ Away	BUK	CPB	CHE	DIN	DNI	EPD	KAH	KAR	KYI	LIV	LNZ	LUB	MUN	NVV	RUB
Bukovyna Chernivtsi		1–0			1–0		1–0	1–2	0–0	1–3		4–1	0–1		5–1
Chaika	0–0					1–0	0–5	0–4	1–1	0–0	0–4	3–0	3–4	2–2	1–1
FC Chernihiv	0–0	2–2		1–2	2–1	3–2			0–0				0–2	0–0	2–1
Dinaz Vyshhorod	4–2	3–0			1–1	0–1		1–0	4–0		0–2			2–0	4–1
Dnipro Cherkasy	3–1	1–3	1–0	1–2		1–3		1–3	1–1		ppd (Note: The Round 15 game Dnipro vs LNZ, scheduled for 24 October 2021, was eventually rescheduled to 4 May 2022, as 11 LNZ players were diagnosed with COVID-19 and one more player was serving a disqualification.)			0–2	
Epitsentr Dunaivtsi	1–0	5–0						0–1	1–0	3–1	1–2	1–0	3–1	1–0	1–0
Karpaty Halych		1–0	1–1	0–1	2–0	0–1			2–1			0–0	0–0	3–2	3–0
Karpaty Lviv			5–0	2–0	5–1		4–0		2–1	2–0		2–0	1–0		3–0
AFSC Kyiv			1–3	0–2	0–3			0–3			0–2	2–1			1–1
Livyi Bereh Kyiv		4–0	2–0	2–0	3–1	4–0	2–1		2–0		2–1	1–0	2–1		
LNZ Cherkasy	0–2		1–0	2–0		1–1	5–0	1–0	4–0	2–1		3–0		ppd (Note: The Round 14 game LNZ vs Nyva, scheduled for 17 October 2021, was eventually rescheduled for 20 March 2022.)	
Lyubomyr Stavyshche			0–3	2–3	1–4	1–0	0–3			0–11	0–3			1–2	
MFA Mukachevo	1–1		1–0	1–3	2–1		2–2		2–0	2–3	1–1	2–0		1–1	
Nyva Vinnytsia	0–0	2–0				3–5		1–2	4–0	0–2		3–1	3–0 (Note: The Round 4 game Nyva vs Munkach, that took place on 14 August 2021 and ended in Nyva's victory (3:1), was reverted. According to the UAF CDC decision dated 19 August 2021 regarding a violation of the Regulations on the permitted number of football player substitutions, Nyva was awarded a technical victory (3:0), while Munkach was awarded a technical loss (0:3).)		4–0
Rubikon Kyiv	0–3 (Note: The Round 19 game Rubikon vs Bukovyna, scheduled for 22 November 2021, never took place. According to the UAF CDC decision dated 2 December 2021 for non-appearance, Rubikon was awarded a technical loss (0:3), while Bukovyna received a technical victory (3:0).)		2–0	0–1	0–3		3–0	0–5		0–2	1–2	1–0	0–1		

Updated to match(es) played on 28 November 2021. Source: pfl.ua (in Ukrainian)
Legend: Blue = home team win; Yellow = draw; Red = away team win.
Notes:

=== Top goalscorers ===
As of 28 November 2021

Rank	Scorer	Team	Goals (Pen.)	Games
1	(Ukraine) Artur Zahorulko	Nyva Vinnytsia	12 (2)	13

=== Number of teams by region (Group A) ===
Number	Region	Team(s)
3	Kyiv Oblast	Chaika, Dinaz and Lyubomyr
3	Kyiv	AFSC Kyiv, Livyi Bereh and Rubikon
2	Cherkasy Oblast	Dnipro and LNZ
1	Chernihiv Oblast	Chernihiv
1	Chernivtsi Oblast	Bukovyna
1	Ivano-Frankivsk Oblast	Karpaty Halych
1	Khmelnytskyi Oblast	Epitsentr
1	Lviv Oblast	Karpaty Lviv
1	Vinnytsia Oblast	Nyva
1	Zakarpattia Oblast	MFA Mukachevo

== Group B ==
Pos	Team	Pld	W	D	L	GF	GA	GD	Pts	Promotion, qualification or relegation
1	Metalurh Zaporizhzhia	19	13	6	0	34	7	+27	45	Promotion to Ukrainian First League
2	Skoruk Tomakivka	20	12	5	3	33	14	+19	41	Promotion to Ukrainian First League
3	Peremoha Dnipro	20	12	3	5	34	14	+20	39 (Note: Peremoha: 3 pts; Balkany: 0 pts)	Withdrew after season
4	Balkany Zorya	20	10	9	1	34	14	+20	39	Withdrew after season
5	Tavriya Simferopol (Note: Due to Russo-Ukrainian War, Tavriya Simferopol, Enerhiya Nova Kakhovka, Viktoriya Mykolaivka, Sumy and Trostianets withdrew from competitions after the season.)	19	9	6	4	28	19	+9	33	Withdrew after season
6	Poltava	20	9	4	7	29	27	+2	31 (Note: Poltava: 3 pts; Trostianets: 0 pts)	Promotion to Ukrainian First League
7	Trostianets	19	9	4	6	34	29	+5	31	Withdrew after season
8	Mykolaiv	17	8	6	3	35	24	+11	30	Withdrew after season
9	Vovchansk	20	7	6	7	27	25	+2	27 (Note: Vovchansk: 6 pts; Viktoriya: 0 pts)	Withdrew after season
10	Viktoriya Mykolaivka	19	8	3	8	22	23	−1	27	Withdrew after season
11	Yarud Mariupol	20	6	6	8	36	29	+7	24	Promotion to Ukrainian First League
12	Nikopol	20	5	5	10	22	42	−20	20	Withdrew after season
13	Enerhiya Nova Kakhovka	20	5	2	13	20	40	−20	17	Withdrew after season
14	Real Pharma Odesa	20	4	2	14	22	49	−27	14	
15	Krystal Kherson	20	2	3	15	19	36	−17	9	Withdrew after season
16	Sumy	19	1	2	16	16	53	−37	5	Withdrew after season

Source: PFL.ua
Rules for classification: 1) Points; 2) Head-to-head points; 3) Head-to-head goal difference; 4) Head-to-head goals scored; 5) Goal difference in all games; 6) Goals scored in all games (Note: calculation by criteria indicated in rules 2, 3, 4 is conducted with consideration of all teams that have equal number of tournament points at the moment of calculation and not only among those which after preliminary criteria have appeared more successful).

=== Results ===
Home \ Away	BAZ	ENK	KRY	MEZ	MYK	NIK	POL	PER	RPO	SKO	SUM	TAV	TRO	VIM	VOV	YAR
Balkany Zoria		1–0		0–0		5–0		0–1	5–0	0–0			4–1	1–1	1–1	2–1
Enerhiya Nova Kakhovka				0–1	2–3	0–4		0–1	4–3	0–0	3–1	0–2		0–1		1–1
Krystal Kherson	1–2	1–2					6–0	0–2		0–1	0–0	1–1	2–2	0–2	0–1	
Metalurh Zaporizhya	0–0		1–0		2–1	3–2	1–0			1–0	5–0	2–1	1–0		1–1	
Mykolaiv	1–2		2–1				1–2		1–1	2–0	4–0	2–2	1–1	ppd (Note: The Round 19 game Mykolaiv vs Viktoriya, scheduled on 21 November 2021, was eventually rescheduled for 23 March 2022.)	2–0	
FC Nikopol	2–2		2–1	0–6	1–1		1–1		0–1	0–1	1–1	2–1	2–2			
SC Poltava	1–1	2–3	4–1					2–0		1–2	3–0	1–3	2–0		2–2	0–0
Peremoha Dnipro		3–1	5–0	0–1	1–2	4–0	0–1		2–0	0–0				1–0		3–1
Real Pharma Odesa	1–1	0–1	2–1	0–3	2–4	2–4	1–2				5–1	0–3			2–0	
Skoruk Tomakivka	0–2			1–1			3–1	1–1	4–0		6–0	2–0	3–2	2–1		2–1
Sumy	1–2	3–0	0–2		ppd (Note: The Round 20 game Sumy vs Mykolaiv, scheduled for 27 November 2021, was eventually rescheduled to 4 May 2022 as 14 Mykolaiv players had a medical emergency including COVID-19.)		1–3	1–3				0–3 (Note: The Round 12 game between Sumy and Tavriya, scheduled for 6 October 2021, did not take place. According to the UAF CDC decision dated 6 October 2021 on the match cancellation, Sumy were awarded a technical loss (0:3), while Tavriya received a technical victory (3:0).)			1–2	1–4
Tavriya Simferopol	1–1	4–1	3–1		ppd (Note: The Round 18 game Tavriya vs Mykolaiv, scheduled for 14 November 2021, was eventually rescheduled for 18 March 2022.)	2–1		2–2					0–2	1–1	1–0	1–0
FC Trostianets	1–2	2–1		ppd (Note: The Round 20 game Trostianets vs Metalurh, scheduled for 27 November 2021, was eventually rescheduled to 19 March 2022, as 15 players from Trostianets had medical emergencies, including COVID-19, and 2 more players were serving disqualification.)	4–2	2–1		1–0	1–0		4–1			0–1	2–1	2–2
Viktoriya Mykolaivka		3–1	2–1	0–1	1–3	0–1	1–0		2–1		3–2				0–1	0–2
Vovchansk		4–0		1–1		2–0		0–3	4–1	1–2		0–0	3–5	2–0		1–1
Yarud Mariupol			2–0	1–3	2–2	5–0	0–1	1–2	6–0	0–3	3–2			3–3		

Updated to match(es) played on 27 November 2021. Source: pfl.ua (in Ukrainian)
Legend: Blue = home team win; Yellow = draw; Red = away team win.

=== Top goalscorers ===
As of 27 November 2021

Rank	Scorer	Team	Goals (Pen.)	Games
1	(Ukraine) Serhiy Kravchenko	MFC Mykolaiv	13 (4)	15
2	(Ukraine) Oleksiy Boyko	Tavriya Simferopol	13 (6)	18
3	(Ukraine) Hlib Lityuk	Yarud Mariupol	13 (3)	19
4	(Ukraine) Anton Kicha	Peremoha Dnipro	12 (2)	18

=== Number of teams by region (Group B) ===
Number	Region	Team(s)
3	Dnipropetrovsk Oblast	Nikopol, Peremoha and Skoruk
3	Sumy Oblast	Sumy, Trostianets and Viktoriya
2	Kherson Oblast	Enerhiya and Krystal
2	Odesa Oblast	Balkany and Real Pharma
1	Crimea	Tavriya
1	Donetsk Oblast	Yarud
1	Kharkiv Oblast	Vovchansk
1	Mykolaiv Oblast	Mykolaiv
1	Poltava Oblast	Poltava
1	Zaporizhia Oblast	Metalurh

== Post-season play-offs ==
Following the league season (double round-robin tournament), winners of both group are expected to meet to contest the 2021–22 Second League championship title. In addition, the third placed teams in each group expected to contest a single berth for promotion play-off with the 12th place team of the 2021–22 First League.

=== Championship game ===
Winner of the Group A	Cancelled	Winner of the Group B

=== Promotion play-offs ===
Third placed of the Group A	Cancelled	Third placed of the Group B

== Awards ==
=== Round awards ===
Round	Player			Coach		
Round	Player	Club	Reference	Coach	Club	Reference
Round 1	(Ukraine) Anton Yaremenko	SC Poltava		(Ukraine) Oleh Naduda	Epitsentr Dunaivtsi	
Round 2	(Ukraine) Vadym Shavrin	Viktoriya Mykolaivka		(Ukraine) Volodymyr Sysenko	SC Poltava	
Round 3	(Ukraine) Anton Kicha	Peremoha Dnipro		(Ukraine) Anatoliy Buznyk	Livyi Bereh Kyiv	
Round 4	(Ukraine) Serhiy Kravchenko	MFC Mykolaiv		(Ukraine) Yuriy Bakalov	LNZ Cherkasy	
Round 5	(Ukraine) Yevhen Chepurnenko	Dinaz Vyshhorod		(Ukraine) Volodymyr Bondarenko	Dinaz Vyshhorod	
Round 6	(Ukraine) Danylo Falkovskyi	MFC Mykolaiv		(Ukraine) Serhiy Shevchenko	MFC Mykolaiv	
Round 7	(Ukraine) Dzhaba Fkhakadze	Peremoha Dnipro		(Ukraine) Serhiy Vorobey	Peremoha Dnipro	
Round 8	(Ukraine) Artur Zahorulko	Nyva Vinnytsia		(Ukraine) Eduard Khavrov	Enerhiya Nova Kakhovka	
Round 9	(Ukraine) Oleksiy Sydorov	Metalurh Zaporizhia		(Ukraine) Andriy Tlumak	Karpaty Lviv	
Round 10	(Ukraine) Vasyl Palahnyuk	Bukovyna Chernivtsi		(Ukraine) Yevhen Kovalenko	Bukovyna Chernivtsi	
Round 11	(Ukraine) Mykyta Ihumenov	Real Pharma Odesa		(Ukraine) Andriy Tlumak	Karpaty Lviv	
Round 12	(Ukraine) Serhiy Platunov	Balkany Zorya		(Ukraine) Volodymyr Mykytyn	Metalurh Zaporizhia	
Round 13	(Ukraine) Bohdan Lazarenko	FC Chernihiv		(Ukraine) Valeriy Chornyi	FC Chernihiv	
Round 14	(Ukraine) Denys Kozhanov	Karpaty Lviv		(Ukraine) Denys Kolchin	Balkany Zorya	
Round 15	(Ukraine) Yevhen Kovalenko	Metalurh Zaporizhia		(Ukraine) Anatoliy Buznik	Livyi Bereh Kyiv	
Round 16	(Ukraine) Yevhen Chepurnenko	Dinaz Vyshhorod		(Ukraine) Yuriy Bakalov	LNZ Cherkasy	
Round 17	(Ukraine) Hlib Lityuk	Yarud Mariupol		(Ukraine) Oleh Naduda	Epitsentr Dunaivtsi	
Round 18	(Ukraine) Mykyta Zhukov	Skoruk Tomakivka		(Ukraine) Oleksandr Stepanov	Skoruk Tomakivka	
Round 19	(Ukraine) Volodymyr Pryyomov	Balkany Zorya		(Ukraine) Vadym Lazorenko	Lyubomyr Stavyshche	
Round 20	(Ukraine) Vitaliy Mentey	FC Chernihiv		(Ukraine) Andriy Tlumak	Karpaty Lviv	

== See also ==
- 2021–22 Ukrainian Premier League
- 2021–22 Ukrainian First League
- 2021–22 Ukrainian Football Amateur League
- 2021–22 Ukrainian Cup
- List of Ukrainian football transfers summer 2021
