= 2020–21 Ukrainian Amateur Cup =

2020–21 Ukrainian Cup for amateur teams
Tournament details
- Country: Ukraine
- Dates: 16 September 2020 – 19 May 2021
- Teams: 28

Final positions
- Champions: FC LNZ-Lebedyn
- Runners-up: FC Olimpiya Savyntsi
- Ukrainian Cup: Feniks Pidmonastyr; Olympiya Savyntsi

Tournament statistics
- Matches played: 42
- Goals scored: 98 (2.33 per match)
- Attendance: 0 (0 per match)
- All statistics correct as of 30 October 2020.

The 2020-21 Ukrainian Amateur Cup was the 25th season of the national football cup competition for amateur teams, which season started on September 16, 2020.

The reigning cup holder FC Olimpiya Savyntsi was defeated by FC LNZ-Lebedyn in the competition final.

== Participated clubs ==
In bold are clubs that were active at the same season AAFU championship (parallel round-robin competition).

- Cherkasy Oblast: **LNZ-Lebedyn**
- Dnipropetrovsk Oblast: FC Lozuvatka
- Ivano-Frankivsk Oblast: Karpaty Broshniv-Osada
- Kharkiv Oblast (2): Univer-Dynamo Kharkiv, **FC Vovchansk**
- Kherson Oblast: **SC Kakhovka**
- Kyiv Oblast (4): **AFSC Kyiv**, Dzhuniors Shpytky, Nyva Buzova, Sokil Mykhailivka-Rubezhivka
- Luhansk Oblast: Skif Shulhynka
- Lviv Oblast: Demnia-Feniks Demnia/Pidmonastyr
- Odesa Oblast: Sehedka-Tarutyne
- Poltava Oblast: **Olimpiya Savyntsi**
- Rivne Oblast: **ODEK Orzhiv**
- Sumy Oblast (5): Kolos Severynivka, Naftovyk Okhtyrka, **Sumy** (LS Group), Veleten Hlukhiv, **Viktoria Mykolaivka**
- Volyn Oblast (3): Kovel-Volyn, LSTM No.536, **Votrans Lutsk**
- Zakarpattia Oblast: **MFA Munkacs Mukacheve**
- Zaporizhzhia Oblast: **Metalurh-2 Zaporizhzhia**
- Zhytomyr Oblast (3): Mal Korosten, Polissia Stavky, Zviahel Novohrad-Volynskyi

Notes

- Last season FC Sumy played as LS Group Verkhnia Syrovatka.
- Since 23 March 2021 Demnia-Feniks Demnia/Pidmonastyr is playing as Feniks Pidmonastyr.
- Olimpiya Savyntsi and Viktoriya Mykolaivka have competed also in the 2020–21 Ukrainian Cup.

== Bracket ==
The following is the bracket that demonstrates the last four rounds of the Ukrainian Cup, including the final match. Numbers in parentheses next to the match score represent the results of a penalty shoot-out.

Round of 16
Votrans Lutsk	0	1	1
Demnia-Feniks Pidmonastyr	1	1	2
Nyva Buzova (a.e.t.)	1	2	3
Polissia Stavky	1	1	2
LSTM No.536 Lutsk	0	2	2
ODEK Orzhiv	1	2	3
Sokil Mykhailivka-Rubezhivka	0	0	0
LNZ-Lebedyn	2	1	3
Viktoriya Mykolaivka	2	3	5
Veleten Hlukhiv	0	0	0
Metalurh-2 Zaporizhzhia	0	0	0
FC Vovchansk	0	1	1
Skif Shulhynka	1	2	3
FC Sumy	1	3	4
Olimpiya Savyntsi	4	1	5
SC Kakhovka	2	1	3

Quarter-finals
Nyva Buzova	1	1	2
Feniks Pidmonastyr	1	2	3
ODEK Orzhiv	0	0	0
LNZ-Lebedyn	1	1	2
FC Vovchansk	0	0	0
Viktoriya Mykolaivka	0	2	2
FC Sumy	2	1	3
Olimpiya Savyntsi	2	2	4

Semi-finals
Feniks Pidmonastyr	1	0	1
LNZ-Lebedyn	1	1	2
Olimpiya Savyntsi	1	1	2
Viktoriya Mykolaivka	1	0	1

Final
Olimpiya Savyntsi	0	0	0
LNZ-Lebedyn	4	2	6

== Results ==
=== Preliminary round ===
First leg games were scheduled to be played on 16 September and second leg on 23 September.

Team 1	Agg.	Team 2	1st leg	2nd leg
LSTM No.536	3–1	Munkach Mukacheve	2–0	1–1
Votrans Lutsk	3–0	Kovel-Volyn	3–0	0–0
Demnia-Feniks Demnia/Pidmonastyr	4–3	Karpaty Broshniv-Osada	1–1	3–2
Polissia Stavky	1–0	Dzhuniors Shpytky	0–0	1–0
Sokil Mykhailivka-Rubezhivka	3–1	Zviahel Novohrad-Volynsky	3–0	0–1
Mal Korosten	2–7	Nyva Buzova	2–4	0–3
AFSC Kyiv	1–2	Veleten Hlukhiv	1–0	0–2
Skif Shulhynka	9–3	Kolos Severynivka	5–0	4–3
Univer-Dynamo Kharkiv	2–2 (a)	Metalurh-2 Zaporizhzhia	2–1	0–1
Naftovyk Okhtyrka	0–3	FC Vovchansk	0–0	0–3
FC Sumy	+/–	FC Lozuvatka		
SC Kakhovka	+/–	Sehedka-Tarutyne		

Notes:

- The game Naftovyk – Vovchansk was postponed to 23 and 30 September
- On 11 September Sehedka-Tarutyne announced that it will not arrive to its scheduled game

=== Round of 16 ===
FC ODEK Orzhiv, FC Viktoriya Mykolaivka, FC LNZ-Lebedyn, FC Olimpiya Savyntsi (all the season's league participants) received a bye to the round. First leg games were scheduled to be played on 7 October and second leg on 14/21 October.

Team 1	Agg.	Team 2	1st leg	2nd leg
Votrans Lutsk	1–2	Demnia-Feniks Demnia/Pidmonastyr	0–1	1–1
Nyva Buzova	3–2 (a.e.t.)	Polissia Stavky	1–1	2–1
LSTM No.536	2–3	ODEK Orzhiv	0–1	2–2 (Note: Games played on October 21)
Sokil Mykhailivka-Rubezhivka	0–3	LNZ-Lebedyn	0–2	0–1
Viktoriya Mykolaivka	5–0	Veleten Hlukhiv	2–0	3–0
Metalurh-2 Zaporizhzhia	0–1	FC Vovchansk	0–0	0–1
Skif Shulhynka	3–4	FC Sumy	1–1	2–3
Olimpiya Savyntsi	5–3	SC Kakhovka	4–2	1–1

=== Quarterfinals ===
First leg games were scheduled to be played on 28 October and second leg on 4 November. On 22 October 2020, the AAFU confirmed the pairs and postponed Nyva–Demnia-Feniks to spring of 2021. Since 23 March 2021 Demnia-Feniks Demnia/Pidmonastyr is playing as Feniks Pidmonastyr. Games between Nyva and Feniks were scheduled for April 7 and 14.

Team 1	Agg.	Team 2	1st leg	2nd leg
Nyva Buzova	2–3	Feniks Pidmonastyr	1–1	1–2
ODEK Orzhiv	0–2	LNZ-Lebedyn	0–1	0–1
FC Vovchansk	0–2	Viktoriya Mykolaivka	0–0	0–2
FC Sumy	3–4	Olimpiya Savyntsi	2–2	1–2

=== Semifinals ===
The dates of games arrangements were scheduled for 2021. On 8 April 2021 the AAFU determined dates for semifinals and finals. Semifinals will take place on April 21 and 28.

Team 1	Agg.	Team 2	1st leg	2nd leg
Feniks Pidmonastyr	1–2	LNZ-Lebedyn	1–1	0–1
Olimpiya Savyntsi	2–1	Viktoriya Mykolaivka	1–1	1–0

=== Final ===
The dates of games arrangements were scheduled for 2021. Finals will take place on May 12 and 19.

Team 1	Agg.	Team 2	1st leg	2nd leg
Olimpiya Savyntsi	0–6	LNZ-Lebedyn	0–4	0–2

Winner of the 2020–21 Ukrainian Football Cup among amateur teams
LNZ-Lebedyn (Cherkasy Oblast); 2nd time

== See also ==
- 2020–21 Ukrainian Football Amateur League
- 2020–21 Ukrainian Cup
