= 2020–21 Ukrainian Football Amateur League =

Ukrainian Amateur Football Championship
- Season: 2020–21
- Dates: 5 September 2020 – 30 May 2021
- Final stage winner: LNZ Cherkasy (1st title) Viktoriya Mykolaivka (losing finalist)
- Promoted: 12 – Karpaty, MFA, Viktoriya, LNZ, Livyi Bereh, AFSC, Liubomyr, Vovchansk, Sumy, Skoruk, Poltava, Trostianets
- All statistics correct as of 30 June 2021.

The 2020–21 Ukrainian championship in football season was the 25th since it replaced the competition of physical culture clubs.

On 11 August 2020, the AAFU published information about the upcoming season with a tentative composition. The championship is expected to start on 29 August 2020.

On 5 September 2020 30 teams started the 25th Ukrainian championship in football among amateurs. The last season champion Viktoriya Mykolaivka are defending their title since declining their opportunity for promotion to professional competitions. The composition of the competition changed notable from the last season with 7 clubs being promoted, while other 9 clubs refused to continue their participation for this season. With competitions already ongoing on September 30 (Dnipro-1-Borysfen) and October 22 (Karpaty Lviv) two more teams also joined the competitions bringing the total number of participating clubs to 32.

== Teams ==
=== Returning/reformed clubs ===
- FC Skoruk Tomakivka (returning, last played season in 2018–19)
- Kryvbas-2 Kryvyi Rih (returning, last played season in 2016 as Kryvbas Kryvyi Rih; formerly Hirnyk Kryvyi Rih)

=== Debut ===
List of teams that are debuting this season in the league.

- AFSC Kyiv
- FC Kudrivka
- MFA Mukachevo
- Varatyk Kolomyia

- Dovbush Chernivtsi
- Liubomyr Stavyshche
- Olimpiya Savyntsi
- Yednist Kyiv

- imeni Lva Yashina Kyiv
- Livyi Bereh Kyiv (late start)
- SC Poltava
- Yunist Verkhnia Bilka

- Karpaty Lviv (late start)
- Metalurh-2 Zaporizhia
- FC Sumy

=== Withdrawn teams ===
List of clubs that took part in last year competition, but chose not to participate in 2020–21 season:

- Ahrodim Bakhmach
- Chernihiv-Avanhard
- Kovel-Volyn

- Kremin-Yunior Kremenchuk
- LSTM 536

- Olimpik Kropyvnytskyi
- Pokuttia Kolomyia

- Svitanok-Ahrosvit Shlyakhova
- Tavriya Novotroitske

List of clubs that withdrew during the season or right after it:

- imeni Lva Yashina Kyiv withdrew during the winter break; its results were kept and handed over to Livyi Bereh Kyiv, which replaced it.

Clubs that did not play last season in the league, but showed interest at first, yet withdrew before the start of the season:

- FC OKKO Kharkiv

=== Merged teams / Name change ===
- Tavriya Novotroitske distanced itself from the Russian-occupied Crimea, moving closer to Kakhovka (village Marianivka), later, before the start of the competitions, merged with SC Tavriya Simferopol
- Following the renaming and rebranding of Hirnyk Kryvyi Rih to Kryvbas Kryvyi Rih, on 1 September 2020, it was announced that Hirnyk Kryvyi Rih was supposedly preserved and will be participating in the competitions among amateur teams. Already during the season's winter break, on 21 February 2021, the senior coach of Kryvbas-2 gave an interview, in which he discussed Kryvbas-2, which had replaced Hirnyk, as if Hirnyk had never existed.
- Livyi Bereh Kyiv, before 20 November 2020, was represented by imeni Lva Yashyna Kyiv, whose record was grandfathered. According to the AAFU information partner, the club is one and the same and was renamed. At the Football Federation of Kyiv, there are two separate clubs of the city federation. On 3 December 2020, the club officially announced about its first official training and preparation for the spring half.
- On 23 March 2021 Dnipro-1-Borysfen was renamed into Borysfen Dnipro
- Dnipro-1 Borysfen, late start — a farm team of SC Dnipro-1 was not to be fielded for the AAFU competitions due to the COVID-19 pandemic, but at the end of September it was announced that it will resume its participation.

=== Location map ===
The following displays the location of teams.

Location of prospective teams in the 2020–21 Ukrainian Amateur League

=== Stadiums ===
Group A

Team	Stadium	Position in 2019–20
ODEK	ODEK Stadium	Am1, 1st
Ahron	Tsentralny Stadium	Am1, 3rd
Votrans	Votrans Arena (Pidhaitsi)	Am1, 7th
Nyva	Kolos Stadium	Am1, 8th
Dovbush	Olimpiya Stadium	Reg
Munkach	Avanhard Stadium MFA training field	Reg
Yunist	Yunist Stadium	Reg
Varatyk	Voskresyntsi Stadium Olimpia Stadium (Chernivtsi)	Reg
Karpaty L.	Shkoliar Stadium	New

Group B

Team	Stadium	Position in 2019–20
Viktoriya	Viktoriya Stadium Alians Arena (Bairak)	Am2, 1st
LNZ	LNZ-Arena	Am2, 2nd
Atlet	DYuSSh Atlet Stadium	Am2, 7th
Pervomaisk	Tsentralnyi Stadium	Am2, 10th
Bila Tserkva	Zmina Stadium	Am2, 8th
Liubomyr	Kolos Stadium Dinaz Stadium (Liutizh)	Reg
Olimpiya	Start Stadium (Myrhorod) Lokomotyv Stadium (Poltava) Poltava training field (Kopyly)	Reg
Yednist	Perspektyva Stadium	Reg
Kyiv	Miskyi Stadium (Vyshneve)	Reg
im.L.Yashina Livyi Bereh	Rusanivets Stadium Livyi Bereh (Hnidyn)	Reg
Kudrivka	Kudrivka Arena Yunist Stadium (Chernihiv)	Reg

Group C

Team	Stadium	Position in 2019–20
Vovchansk	Aggregate Factory Stadium Avanhard Stadium (Zmiiv)	Am3, 2nd
Motor	Motor Sich Stadium Lokomotyv Stadium (Polohy) Metalurh training field	Am3, 3rd
Trostianets	Kuts Stadium	Am2, 4th
Kakhovka	Olimpiyskyi Stadium	Am3, 5th
Zirka	Zirka Stadium	Am3, 6th
Lehioner	Molodizhnyi Park Olimpiyski rezervy	Am3, 8th
Borysfen	Olimpiysky Rezervy Novokodatskyi Molodizhnyi Park	Am3, 9th
Skoruk	Pokrovskyi Stadium	Reg
Poltava	Lokomotyv Stadium FC Poltava training base (Kopyly)	Reg
Sumy	Yuvileiny Stadium Avanhard Stadium	Reg
Metalurh-2	Metalurh Training base	Reg
Kryvbas-2	Budivelnyk Stadium Hirnyk Stadium	Reg

Notes:

- Reg — regional championship (Regions of Ukraine)
- Am[#] — AAFU championship where sign (#) indicates Group number

== Group stage ==
=== Group 1 ===
Pos	Team	Pld	W	D	L	GF	GA	GD	Pts	Promotion, qualification or relegation
1	Yunist Verkhnya Bilka (A)	16	11	2	3	32	12	+20	35	Qualification to second stage
2	ODEK Orzhiv (A)	16	8	5	3	32	14	+18	29	Qualification to second stage
3	Votrans Lutsk (X)	16	6	9	1	26	11	+15	27	Withdrawn
4	Karpaty Lviv	16	7	4	5	23	16	+7	25	Admission to Ukrainian Second League
5	Nyva Terebovlya	16	7	3	6	21	15	+6	24	
6	Dovbush Chernivtsi	16	6	5	5	17	22	−5	23	
7	Ahron Velyki Hayi	16	5	3	8	15	22	−7	18	
8	MFA Mukachevo	16	4	4	8	15	20	−5	16	Admission to Ukrainian Second League
9	Varatyk Kolomyia (X)	16	0	1	15	8	57	−49	1	Withdrawn

Source: http://www.aafu.org.ua/
Rules for classification: 1) Points; 2) Wins; 3) Better goal difference; 4) Most goals scored; 5) If any two or more teams has same number of points advantage receive that team that in games with all its opponents that earned same number of points for tiebreak are applied following criteria – 5.1) Points; 5.2) Wins; 5.3) Better goal difference; 5.4) Most goals scored; 6) In event if all criteria for rule 5 are equal, placing for teams is determined according to general criteria for all teams 1, 2, 3, 4; 7) Draw of lots.
(A) Advance to a further round; (X) Withdrew

=== Group 2 ===
Pos	Team	Pld	W	D	L	GF	GA	GD	Pts	Promotion, qualification or relegation
1	Viktoriya Mykolaivka (A)	20	18	1	1	61	21	+40	55	Qualification to second stage Admission to Ukrainian Second League
2	LNZ-Lebedyn (A)	20	14	3	3	56	11	+45	45	Qualification to second stage Admission to Ukrainian Second League
3	Olimpiya Savyntsi (A)	20	14	1	5	48	15	+33	43	Qualification to second stage
4	FC Kudrivka	20	13	3	4	37	16	+21	42	
5	Atlet Kyiv	20	7	7	6	33	34	−1	28	
6	Livyi Bereh Kyiv	20	8	1	11	30	52	−22	25	Admission to Ukrainian Second League
7	Yednist Kyiv	20	6	1	13	21	44	−23	19	
8	MFC Pervomaisk (X)	20	6	1	13	27	51	−24	19	Withdrawn
9	AFSC Kyiv	20	4	3	13	28	52	−24	15	Admission to Ukrainian Second League
10	Lyubomyr Stavyshche	20	3	4	13	21	24	−3	13	Admission to Ukrainian Second League
11	FC Bila Tserkva	20	3	3	14	12	54	−42	12	

Source: http://www.aafu.org.ua/
Rules for classification: 1) Points; 2) Wins; 3) Better goal difference; 4) Most goals scored; 5) If any two or more teams has same number of points advantage receive that team that in games with all its opponents that earned same number of points for tiebreak are applied following criteria – 5.1) Points; 5.2) Wins; 5.3) Better goal difference; 5.4) Most goals scored; 6) In event if all criteria for rule 5 are equal, placing for teams is determined according to general criteria for all teams 1, 2, 3, 4; 7) Draw of lots.
(A) Advance to a further round; (X) Withdrew

Notes

- First half of the season FC imeni Lva Yashina record was +1=0-9 10-45 and was replaced by FC Livyi Bereh.

=== Group 3 ===
Pos	Team	Pld	W	D	L	GF	GA	GD	Pts	Promotion, qualification or relegation
1	Motor Zaporizhzhia (A)	22	17	3	2	59	8	+51	54	Qualification to second stage
2	FC Vovchansk (A)	22	16	4	2	44	10	+34	52	Qualification to second stage Admission to Ukrainian Second League
3	FC Sumy (A)	22	17	0	5	49	20	+29	51	Qualification to second stage Admission to Ukrainian Second League
4	Skoruk Tomakivka	22	16	2	4	59	18	+41	50	Admission to Ukrainian Second League
5	SC Poltava	22	14	4	4	51	20	+31	46	Admission to Ukrainian Second League
6	FC Trostianets	22	8	6	8	43	25	+18	30 (Note: Head-to-head points: Trostianets 4, Kakhovka 1)	Admission to Ukrainian Second League
7	SC Kakhovka	22	9	3	10	35	26	+9	30	
8	Metalurh-2 Zaporizhzhia	22	8	2	12	37	48	−11	26	
9	Kryvbas-2 Kryvyi Rih (X)	22	6	2	14	23	57	−34	20	Withdrawn
10	Borysfen Dnirpo (X)	22	5	0	17	23	53	−30	15	Withdrawn
11	Lehioner Dnipro	22	2	2	18	12	73	−61	8	
12	Zirka Kropyvnytskyi	22	0	0	22	9	86	−77	0	

Source: http://www.aafu.org.ua/
Rules for classification: 1) Points; 2) Wins; 3) Better goal difference; 4) Most goals scored; 5) If any two or more teams has same number of points advantage receive that team that in games with all its opponents that earned same number of points for tiebreak are applied following criteria – 5.1) Points; 5.2) Wins; 5.3) Better goal difference; 5.4) Most goals scored; 6) In event if all criteria for rule 5 are equal, placing for teams is determined according to general criteria for all teams 1, 2, 3, 4; 7) Draw of lots.
(A) Advance to a further round; (X) Withdrew
Notes:

Notes

- The AAFU awarded a technical win for Skoruk 3:0 and loss for Kryvbas-2 for the missed Round 5 game.

== Final stage ==
To the stage qualify eight teams, selection of which is determined exclusively by the AAFU Commission in conducting competitions. Both stages quarterfinals and semifinals consist of two legs (home and away). The final game is scheduled to take place at neutral field.

=== Teams qualified ===
In parentheses are indicated number of times the club qualified for this phase.

- Group 1: Yunist Verkhnia Bilka, ODEK Orzhiv (4)
- Group 2: Viktoriya Mykolaivka (4), LNZ-Lebedyn (3), Olimpiya Savyntsi
- Group 3: Motor Zaporizhia (3), FC Vovchansk(2), FC Sumy

=== Quarterfinals ===
Games are scheduled for 6 and 13 June 2021.

Team 1	Agg.	Team 2	1st leg	2nd leg
LNZ-Lebedyn	3 – 1	Yunist Nyzhnia Bilka	2–0	1–1
Vovchansk	1 – 0	ODEK Orzhiv	1–0	0–0
Sumy	2 – 2 (a)	Viktoriya Mykolaivka	2–1	0–1
Olimpiya Savyntsi	0 – 2	Motor Zaporizhzhia	0–0	0–2

5 June 2021	LNZ-Lebedyn	2–0	Yunist Nyzhnia Bilka	Lebedyn, Cherkasy Oblast
	Koshelyuk 26'; Norenkov 48'	Report		Stadium: LNZ Arena; Attendance: 300; Referee: Serhiy Dubykivskyi (Kyiv Oblast)

5 June 2021	FC Vovchansk	1–0	ODEK Orzhiv	Kharkiv
	Halushka 2'	Report		Stadium: Nova Bavaria; Attendance: 200; Referee: Oleksandr Sadovyi (Kremenchuk)

5 June 2021	Olimpiya Savyntsi	0–0	Motor Zaporizhzhia	Poltava
		Report		Stadium: Lokomotyv; Attendance: 200; Referee: Yevhen Makarenko (Cherkasy)

6 June 2021	FC Sumy	2–1	Viktoriya Mykolaivka	Sumy
	Zribniak 64'; Horbunov 83'	Report	Kasyanov 41'	Stadium: Avanhard; Attendance: 1,500; Referee: Oleksandr Khamkhodera (Kharkiv)

12 June 2021	Viktoriya Mykolaivka	1–0	FC Sumy	Mykolaivka, Sumy Oblast
	Arzhanov 48'; Akimov (penalty missed) 24'	Report		Stadium: Viktoriya; Attendance: 460; Referee: Roman Halitsyn (Kyiv)

13 June 2021	Yunist Nyzhnia Bilka	1–1	LNZ-Lebedyn	Nyzhnia Bilka, Lviv Oblast
	Panasiuk 20'	Report	Storchous 43'	Stadium: Yunist; Attendance: 400; Referee: Serhiy Podryhulia (Lutsk)

13 June 2021	ODEK Orzhiv	0–0	FC Vovchansk	Orzhiv, Rivne Oblast
		Report		Stadium: ODEK; Attendance: 200; Referee: Taras Panasiuk (Berdychiv)

13 June 2021	FC Motor Zaporizhzhia	2–0	Olimpiya Savyntsi	Zaporizhzhia
	Plakhtyr 27'; Lomaka 51'	Report		Stadium: SC Motor Sich; Attendance: 250; Referee: Rostyslav Dubyna (Dnipro)

=== Semifinals ===
The draw for the semifinal round took place on 14 June 2021. Games are scheduled for 19 and 26 June 2021.

Team 1	Agg.	Team 2	1st leg	2nd leg
FC Vovchansk	1 – 1 (a)	Viktoriya Mykolaivka	1–1	0–0
Motor Zaporizhzhia	3 – 4	LNZ-Lebedyn	3–3	0–1

19 June 2021	FC Vovchansk	1–1	Viktoriya Mykolaivka	Kharkiv
18:00	Borzenko 18'	Report	Arzhanov 10'	Stadium: Nova Bavaria; Attendance: 300; Referee: Serhiy Zadyran (Kyiv Oblast)

19 June 2021	Motor Zaporizhzhia	3–3	LNZ-Lebedyn	Zaporizhzhia
17:00 LST	Meli 59', 68'; Bandurin 86'	Report	Dolynskyi 19'; Zamurenko 35'; Poltavtsev 41' (o.g.)	Stadium: SC Motor Sich; Attendance: 300; Referee: Yevhen Petrenko (Odesa)

26 June 2021	Viktoriya Mykolaivka	0–0	FC Vovchansk	Mykolaivka, Sumy Oblast
17:00		Report		Attendance: 247; Referee: Oleksandr Tytov (Donetsk)

26 June 2021	LNZ-Lebedyn	1–0	Motor Zaporizhzhia	Lebedyn, Cherkasy Oblast
17:00	Dolynskyi 45+2'	Report		Stadium: LNZ Arena; Attendance: 600; Referee: Denys Reznikov (Kamianske)

=== Final ===
The final game is scheduled for 30 June 2021.

Team 1	Score	Team 2
LNZ-Lebedyn	2 – 0	Viktoriya Mykolaivka

30 June 2021	LNZ-Lebedyn	2–0	Viktoriya Mykolaivka	Kyiv
17:00	Cherednichenko 4' (o.g.); Zamurenko 90+4'	Report	Arzhanov (red card) 88'	Stadium: NTK im. Bannikova; Referee: Oleksandr Shandor

- Note: On 24 June 2021 both LNZ and Viktoriya were admitted to the Second League. FC LNZ Cherkasy became the third club in history of amateur competitions in Ukraine that won both regular season competition and Ukrainian Amateur Cup. Previously such feat was reached by FC Torpedo Zaporizhia in 1984 and FC KZEZO Kakhovka in 2004.

== Promotions to the Second League ==
Six teams from AAFU are expected to be promoted to the 2021–22 season in Professional Football League (Article 18 of regulations). In early December 2020 it became known that at least 10 teams expressed their intention to receive club's license of the Professional Football League for the next season: MFA Mukachevo, Karpaty Lviv, Nyva Terebovlia, Atlet Kyiv, AFSC Kyiv, Viktoria Mykolaivka, Liubomyr Stavyshche, SC Poltava, FC Sumy, FC Trostianets.

On 7 June 2021 it was announced that 10-11 clubs plan to join the Second League as well as three new second teams. Among them are Karpaty Lviv (Tlumak's), MFA Mukachevo, LNZ-Lebedyn, Livyi Bereh Kyiv, Lyubomyr Stavyshche, AFSC Kyiv, FC Sumy, Skoruk Tomakivka, SC Poltava, Viktoriya Mykolaivka, FC Trostianets, Rukh-2 Lviv, Lviv-2, Kryvbas-2 Kryvyi Rih.

== Number of teams by region ==
Number	Region	Team(s)
4	Dnipropetrovsk Oblast	Borysfen Dnipro, Kryvbas-2 Kryvyi Rih, Lehioner Dnipro, Skoruk Tomakivka
4	Kyiv	AFSC, Atlet, Livyi Bereh, Yednist
3	Sumy Oblast	FC Sumy, FC Trostianets, Viktoriya Mykolaivka
2	Kyiv Oblast	FC Bila Tserkva, Lyubomyr Stavyshche
2	Lviv Oblast	Karpaty Lviv, Yunist Verkhnia Bilka
2	Poltava Oblast	Olimpiya Savyntsi, SC Poltava
2	Ternopil Oblast	Ahron Velyki Hayi, Nyva Terebovlya
2	Zaporizhia Oblast	Metalurh-2 Zaporizhia, Motor Zaporizhia
1	Cherkasy Oblast	LNZ Lebedyn
1	Chernihiv Oblast	FC Kudrivka
1	Chernivtsi Oblast	Dovbush Chernivtsi
1	Ivano-Frankivsk Oblast	Varatyk Kolomyia
1	Kharkiv Oblast	FC Vovchansk
1	Kherson Oblast	SC Kakhovka
1	Kirovohrad Oblast	Zirka Kropyvnytskyi
1	Mykolaiv Oblast	MFC Pervomaisk
1	Rivne Oblast	ODEK Orzhiv
1	Volyn Oblast	Votrans Lutsk
1	Zakarpattia Oblast	MFA Mukachevo

== See also ==
- 2020–21 Ukrainian Amateur Cup
- 2020–21 Ukrainian Second League
- 2020–21 Ukrainian First League
- 2020–21 Ukrainian Premier League
