= Ruslan Pisnyi =

Ukrainian footballer

Personal information
- Full name: Ruslan Ihorovych Pisnyi
- Date of birth: 15 May 1997 (age 29)
- Place of birth: Sumy, Ukraine
- Height: 1.74 m (5 ft 9 in)
- Position: Right back

Team information
- Current team: Alians Lypova Dolyna
- Number: 11

Youth career
- 2011–2014: Barsa Sumy

Senior career*
Years	Team	Apps	(Gls)
2014–2015	Barsa Sumy	9	(2)
2015	Sumy	1	(0)
2015–2018	Ahrobiznes TSK Romny	56	(10)
2018	Sumy	0	(0)
2018–	Alians Lypova Dolyna	68	(10)
- * Club domestic league appearances and goals as of 20 September 2021

Ruslan Ihorovych Pisnyi (Ukrainian: Руслан Ігорович Пісний; born 15 May 1997) is a Ukrainian professional footballer who plays as a right back for Ukrainian club Alians Lypova Dolyna.
