= Dmytro Shamych =

Ukrainian footballer

Personal information
- Full name: Dmytro Vitaliyovych Shamych
- Date of birth: 15 May 2001 (age 25)
- Place of birth: Kyiv, Ukraine
- Height: 1.74 m (5 ft 9 in)
- Position: Right winger

Team information
- Current team: Dinaz Vyshhorod
- Number: 77

Youth career
- 2013–2015: Dynamo Kyiv
- 2015–2018: Zmina-Obolon Kyiv
- 2018–2019: Obolon Kyiv

Senior career*
Years	Team	Apps	(Gls)
2019–2021	Kolos Kovalivka	0	(0)
2021–2022	Metalist Kharkiv	1	(0)
2022	Banik Sokolov	5	(1)
2022–2023	Metalist Kharkiv	2	(0)
2023	Nyva Buzova	3	(0)
2024–	Dinaz Vyshhorod	5	(0)
- * Club domestic league appearances and goals as of 1 July 2024

Dmytro Vitaliyovych Shamych (Ukrainian: Дмитро Віталійович Шамич; born 15 May 2001) is a Ukrainian professional footballer who plays as a right winger for Dinaz Vyshhorod.

== Club career ==
=== Metalist Kharkiv ===
He made his professional debut and scored his first professional goal for Metalist Kharkiv in the winning Ukrainian Cup match against Yarud Mariupol on 18 August 2021.
