= Vadym Shavrin =

Ukrainian footballer

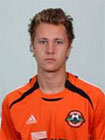

Personal information
- Full name: Vadym Olehovych Shavrin
- Date of birth: 15 May 1988 (age 38)
- Place of birth: Makiivka, Ukrainian SSR
- Height: 1.86 m (6 ft 1 in)
- Position: Striker

Team information
- Current team: Podillya Khmelnytskyi
- Number: 23

Youth career
- 2002–2004: Shakhtar Donetsk

Senior career*
Years	Team	Apps	(Gls)
2004–2009	Shakhtar Donetsk	1	(0)
2005	→ Shakhtar-2 Donetsk	1	(0)
2004–2008	→ Shakhtar-3 Donetsk	44	(16)
2008	→ Stal Alchevsk (loan)	9	(3)
2009	→ Olimpik Donetsk (loan)	10	(5)
2009	Volyn Lutsk	5	(1)
2009–2012	Olimpik Donetsk	51	(30)
2012–2013	Zirka Kirovohrad	24	(10)
2013–2014	Poltava	18	(3)
2014–2015	Helios Kharkiv	22	(3)
2015	Slavkhlib Slovyansk		
2016	Okean Kerch		
2016	Poltava	3	(1)
2016–2017	Mykolaiv	9	(0)
2017	Avanhard Kramatorsk	19	(3)
2017–2019	Polissya Zhytomyr	31	(13)
2019	Avanhard Kramatorsk	7	(0)
2020–2021	Sumy		
2021–2022	Viktoriya Mykolaivka		
2022	Naftovyk Okhtyrka		
2022–2024	Viktoriya Sumy	34	(14)
2024–	Podillya Khmelnytskyi	41	(10)

International career
2005	Ukraine U17	4	(0)
2005	Ukraine U18	3	(1)
2008	Ukraine U21	1	(0)
- * Club domestic league appearances and goals as of 4 June 2026

Vadym Shavrin (Ukrainian: Вадим Олегович Шаврін, born 15 May 1988) is a Ukrainian professional footballer who plays as a forward for Podillya Khmelnytskyi.

Shavrin is a product of the FC Shakhtar Donetsk youth sports school. He made his debut for Shakhtar Donetsk in the Ukrainian Premier League on 17 June 2007 in a match against Metalurh Zaporizhia.
