= Artur Ornat =

Ukrainian footballer

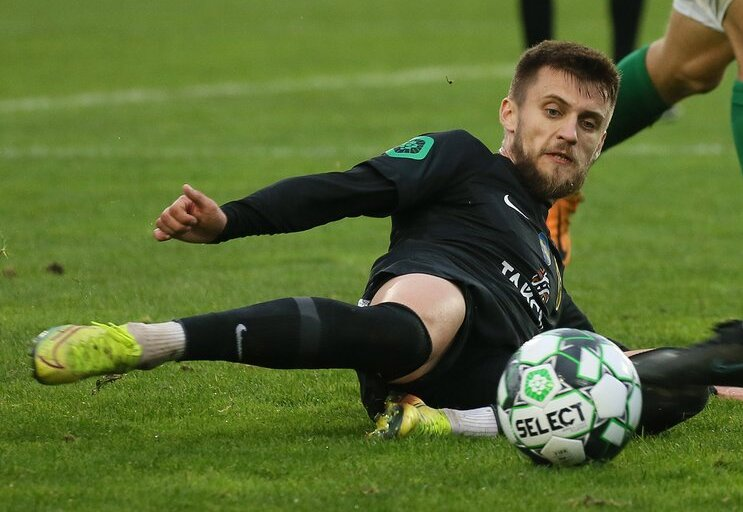
- Ornat playing for Bukovyna Chernivtsi in 2022

Personal information
- Full name: Artur Hennadiyovych Ornat
- Date of birth: 9 September 1999 (age 27)
- Place of birth: Dzhankoy, Ukraine
- Height: 1.78 m (5 ft 10 in)
- Position: Attacking midfielder

Team information
- Current team: Maramuresh Solotvynska

Youth career
- 2014–2015: KOLIFKS Kostopil
- 2015–2016: Barsa Sumy

Senior career*
Years	Team	Apps	(Gls)
2016	Barsa Sumy (amateurs)	5	(0)
2018	Kormil Davydiv (amateurs)	15	(0)
2019	Yunist Hiyche (amateurs)	7	(0)
2019–2020	Cosmos Nowotaniec	8	(1)
2020	Karpaty Halych	4	(0)
2021	Bukovyna Chernivtsi	27	(3)
2022	Bukovyna Chernivtsi	1	(0)
2022–2023	Nyva Vinnytsia	8	(0)
2023–2024	Hirnyk-Sport Horishni Plavni	11	(0)
2024–	Maramuresh Solotvynska		
- * Club domestic league appearances and goals as of 30 March 2024

Artur Hennadiyovych Ornat (Ukrainian: Артур Геннадійович Орнат; born 9 September 1999) is a Ukrainian professional footballer who plays as an attacking midfielder for Maramuresh Solotvynska.
