= Roman Kuzmyn =

Ukrainian footballer

Personal information
- Full name: Roman Vasylyovych Kuzmyn
- Date of birth: 19 June 1996 (age 30)
- Place of birth: Tsineva, Ivano-Frankivsk Oblast, Ukraine
- Height: 1.80 m (5 ft 11 in)
- Position: Right-back

Team information
- Current team: Ahrobiznes Volochysk
- Number: 10

Youth career
- 2011–2012: Prykarpattia Ivano-Frankivsk
- 2012: Karpaty Halych
- 2012: DYuSSh Rozhnyativ
- 2012–2013: Prykarpattia Ivano-Frankivsk
- 2013: Hazovyk Bohorodchany
- 2014: Karpaty Broshniv-Osada

Senior career*
Years	Team	Apps	(Gls)
2014–2015	Hoverla Uzhhorod	0	(0)
2015–2016	Karpaty Broshniv-Osada	50	(19)
2017	Bad Westernkotten	12	(5)
2017	Karpaty Broshniv-Osada	2	(1)
2017–2018	Prykarpattia Ivano-Frankivsk	24	(7)
2018–2019	Bad Westernkotten	14	(6)
2019–2023	Prykarpattia Ivano-Frankivsk	97	(6)
2023–26	Ahrobiznes Volochysk	81	(18)
2026-	FC Oleksandriya	14	(2)
- * Club domestic league appearances and goals as of 25/10/26 @ 16:13(AEST)

Roman Vasylyovych Kuzmyn (Ukrainian: Роман Васильович Кузьмин; born 19 June 1996) is a Ukrainian professional footballer who plays as a right-back for Ukrainian club Ahrobiznes Volochysk.
