= 1984 KFK competitions (Ukraine) =

KFK competitions
- Season: 1984
- Champions: Torpedo Zaporizhia

The 1984 KFK competitions in Ukraine were part of the 1984 Soviet KFK competitions that were conducted in the Soviet Union. It was 21st season of the KFK in Ukraine since its introduction in 1964.

== First stage ==
=== Group 1 ===
Pos	Team	Pld	W	D	L	GF	GA	GD	Pts
1	Naftovyk Dolyna	14	11	1	2	44	13	+31	23
2	Nyva Pidhaitsi	14	8	1	5	12	22	−10	17
3	Silmash Kolomyia	14	7	3	4	15	13	+2	17
4	Avanhard Svalyava	14	7	1	6	22	18	+4	15
5	Karpaty Dubove	14	6	1	7	16	23	−7	13
6	Urozhai Kolchyne	14	5	3	6	18	23	−5	13
7	Druzhba Zbarazh	14	3	2	9	5	19	−14	8
8	Karpaty Storozhynets	0	-	-	-	-	-	—	0

Source: ukr-football.org.ua

=== Group 2 ===
Pos	Team	Pld	W	D	L	GF	GA	GD	Pts
1	Avtomobilist Lviv	14	10	2	2	25	9	+16	22
2	Sokil Haisyn	14	9	2	3	20	8	+12	20
3	Silmash Kovel	14	5	3	6	7	12	−5	13
4	Temp	14	7	1	6	18	14	+4	15
5	Tsementnyk Mykolaiv	14	4	5	5	14	15	−1	13
6	Papirnyk Malyn	14	8	2	4	24	12	+12	18
7	Horyn Rovno	14	2	2	10	11	30	−19	6
8	Korchahinets Shepetivka	14	1	3	10	7	26	−19	5

Source: ukr-football.org.ua

=== Group 3 ===
Pos	Team	Pld	W	D	L	GF	GA	GD	Pts
1	Voskhod Kyiv	14	11	2	1	22	6	+16	24
2	Naftovyk Okhtyrka	14	11	1	2	30	16	+14	23
3	Bilshovyk Kyiv	14	5	6	3	21	18	+3	16
4	Lyvarnyk Sumy	14	4	4	6	17	19	−2	12
5	Tiasmyn Smila	14	4	3	7	12	18	−6	11
6	Budivelnyk Prypiat	14	3	4	7	16	23	−7	10
7	Mashynobudivnyk Borodianka	14	2	4	8	17	28	−11	8
8	Shakhtar Oleksandriya	14	2	3	9	15	22	−7	7

Source: ukr-football.org.ua

=== Group 4 ===
Pos	Team	Pld	W	D	L	GF	GA	GD	Pts
1	Vorskla Poltava	16	11	3	2	33	13	+20	25
2	Bliuminh Kramatorsk	16	9	3	4	24	12	+12	21
3	Hirnyk Pavlohrad	16	5	8	3	13	11	+2	18
4	Avanhard Lozova	16	7	5	4	18	13	+5	19
5	Radyst Kirovohrad	16	8	1	7	25	19	+6	17
6	Avanhard Derhachi	16	7	2	7	18	15	+3	16
7	Shakhtar Donetsk	16	6	3	7	14	16	−2	15
8	Naftovyk Karlivka	16	4	2	10	12	34	−22	10
9	Tekstylnyk Chernihiv	16	1	1	14	5	29	−24	3

Source: ukr-football.org.ua

=== Group 5 ===
Pos	Team	Pld	W	D	L	GF	GA	GD	Pts
1	Enerhiya Nova Kakhovka	14	9	5	0	30	14	+16	23
2	Kolos Osokorivka	14	8	4	2	24	12	+12	20
3	Sudnoremontnyk Illichivsk	12	6	2	4	16	22	−6	14
4	Khvylia Mykolaiv	15	5	4	6	19	13	+6	14
5	Frehat Pervomaisk	14	5	4	5	12	17	−5	14
6	Khimik Zaporizhia	16	4	6	6	17	18	−1	14
7	Avanhard Dzankoy	14	3	3	8	13	17	−4	9
8	Zirka Odesa	13	0	4	9	6	24	−18	4

Source: ukr-football.org.ua

=== Group 6 ===
Pos	Team	Pld	W	D	L	GF	GA	GD	Pts
1	Torpedo Zaporizhia	14	10	4	0	24	2	+22	24
2	Sokil Rovenky	14	6	6	2	21	11	+10	18
3	Kirovets Makiivka	14	4	5	5	15	17	−2	13
4	Metalurh Kupiansk	14	6	4	4	8	13	−5	16
5	Shakhtar Sverdlovsk	14	4	4	6	14	19	−5	12
6	Bazhanovets Makiivka	14	5	3	6	16	12	+4	13
7	Pervomayets Pervomaisk	14	2	4	8	11	18	−7	8
8	Shakhtar Dzerzhynsk	13	4	0	9	9	26	−17	8

Source: ukr-football.org.ua

== Final ==
Pos	Team	Pld	W	D	L	GF	GA	GD	Pts
1	Torpedo Zaporizhia	5	4	1	0	9	2	+7	9
2	Enerhiya Nova Kakhovka	5	2	2	1	9	5	+4	6
3	Skhid Kyiv	5	2	2	1	7	5	+2	6
4	Vorskla Poltava	5	1	1	3	4	8	−4	3
5	Avtomobilist Lviv	5	1	1	3	3	10	−7	3
6	Naftovyk Dolyna	5	0	3	2	5	7	−2	3

Source: regional-football.ru
