= Andriy Hert =

Ukrainian footballer

Personal information
- Full name: Andriy Yevhenovych Hert
- Date of birth: 2 September 1994 (age 32)
- Place of birth: Dnipropetrovsk, Ukraine
- Height: 1.81 m (5 ft 11 in)
- Position: Left back

Team information
- Current team: Kirchheimer SC
- Number: 39

Youth career
- 2006–2007: Dnipro-75 Dnipropetrovsk
- 2007–2010: ISTA Dnipropetrovsk

Senior career*
Years	Team	Apps	(Gls)
2010	ISTA-Yuvileynyi Dnipropetrovsk	2	(0)
2010–2014	Zorya Luhansk	0	(0)
2014–2015	VPK-Ahro Shevchenkivka	1	(0)
2015	Inhulets Petrove	0	(0)
2015–2016	Petrykivka	8	(3)
2016–2017	Naftovyk-Ukrnafta Okhtyrka	9	(0)
2017–2020	Nyva Ternopil	51	(3)
2020–2021	Hirnyk-Sport Horishni Plavni	15	(1)
2021–2022	Alians Lypova Dolyna	28	(3)
2022–	Kirchheimer SC	0	(0)
- * Club domestic league appearances and goals as of 14 July 2022

Andriy Yevhenovych Hert (Ukrainian: Андрій Євгенович Герт; born 2 September 1994) is a Ukrainian professional footballer who plays as a left back for German club Kirchheimer SC.
