= Yaroslav Halenko =

Ukrainian footballer

Personal information
- Full name: Yaroslav Oleksandrovych Halenko
- Date of birth: 7 January 1991 (age 35)
- Place of birth: Kyiv, Ukrainian SSR
- Height: 1.87 m (6 ft 2 in)
- Position: Forward

Team information
- Current team: Viktoriya Sumy
- Number: 17

Youth career
- –2008: Chayka Kyiv
- 2008: FC Zmina-Obolon Kyiv

Senior career*
Years	Team	Apps	(Gls)
2008	Obolon-2 Kyiv	5	(0)
2010–2014	Zirka Kirovohrad	93	(18)
2011	→ Nyva Ternopil (loan)	13	(4)
2015	Helios Kharkiv	4	(0)
2016	Metalist Kharkiv	0	(0)
2016	Hirnyk-Sport Horishni Plavni	6	(1)
2017	TSK Simferopol	10	(1)
2017–2018	Sumy	17	(0)
2018	Merani Martvili	9	(0)
2019	Bukovyna Chernivtsi	10	(1)
2019–2021	Polissya Zhytomyr	42	(16)
2021–2023	LNZ Cherkasy	35	(10)
2022	→ SK Bischofshofen (loan)	12	(7)
2023–	Viktoriya Sumy	9	(1)
- * Club domestic league appearances and goals as of 26 September 2023

Yaroslav Halenko (Ukrainian: Ярослав Олександрович Галенко; born 7 January 1991) is a Ukrainian professional footballer who plays as a forward for Viktoriya Sumy.

== Career ==
Halenko is the product of the Youth Sportive School Chayka Kyiv and FC Obolon Kyiv's Youth Systems, and his first trainer was Oleh Tsaryuk.

Halenko's professional career continue, when he was promoted to FC Obolon-2 Kyiv in the Ukrainian Second League. And in 2010 he made his debut for the Ukrainian First League.
