= Oleksandr Myzyuk =

Ukrainian footballer

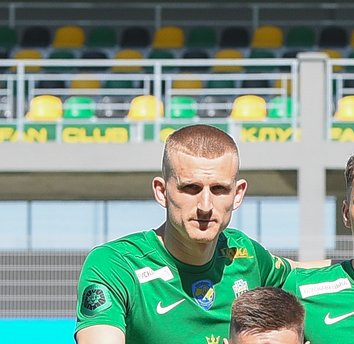

Personal information
- Full name: Oleksandr Pavlovych Myzyuk
- Date of birth: 31 May 1995 (age 31)
- Place of birth: Borova, Ukraine
- Height: 1.89 m (6 ft 2 in)
- Position: Centre-back

Team information
- Current team: Metalist Kharkiv
- Number: 2

Youth career
- 2008–2011: Olimpik Donetsk
- 2012–2013: Mriya Norven Kupiansk

Senior career*
Years	Team	Apps	(Gls)
2013	Derhachi-KhDZVA	0	(0)
2015	Lozova-Panyutyne	23	(2)
2016	Status Kehychivka	19	(2)
2017–2020	Vovchansk	60	(8)
2020–	Metalist Kharkiv	109	(4)
2023–2024	→ Karpaty Lviv (loan)	22	(0)
- * Club domestic league appearances and goals as of 4 June 2026

Oleksandr Pavlovych Myzyuk (Ukrainian: Олександр Павлович Мизюк; born 31 May 1995) is a Ukrainian professional footballer who plays as a centre-back for Metalist Kharkiv.
