= Vladyslav Savchuk =

Ukrainian footballer

Personal information
- Full name: Vladyslav Valeriyovych Savchuk
- Date of birth: 1 November 1979 (age 46)
- Place of birth: Kyiv, Ukrainian SSR, Soviet Union
- Height: 1.81 m (5 ft 11 in)
- Position: Midfielder

Team information
- Current team: Kolos Kovalivka (youth coach)

Youth career
- Lokomotyv Kyiv

Senior career*
Years	Team	Apps	(Gls)
1997	Polihraftekhnika Oleksandria	8	(0)
1998–1999	Torpedo-Kadino Mogilev	31	(3)
2000–2001	FC Cherkasy	29	(4)
2000–2001	→ FC Cherkasy-2	6	(0)
2001–2003	Tom Tomsk	25	(1)
2003–2005	Metalist Kharkiv	22	(2)
2004	→ Zorya Luhansk (loan)	7	(0)
2004	→ Zoria-Hirnyk Yuvileine (loan)	3	(0)
2005–2006	Nistru Otaci	8	(0)
2006	Sodovik Sterlitamak	10	(1)
2007	Dnipro Cherkasy	12	(0)
2007–2008	Nistru Otaci	7	(0)
2008–2009	Kotwica Kołobrzeg	26	(2)
2010–2011	Dinaz Vyshhorod	8	(0)
2012–2015	Kolos Kovalivka	53	(1)

Managerial career
- 2009–2014: Arsenal Kyiv sports school
- 2012–2018: Kolos Kovalivka (assistant)
- 2018–2019: Kolos Kovalivka (U17)
- 2019–2020: Kolos Kovalivka (U19)
- 2020–2021: Kolos Kovalivka II
- 2021: SC Chaika Petropavlivska Borshchahivka
- * Club domestic league appearances and goals

Vladyslav Savchuk (Ukrainian: Владислав Савчук; born 1 November 1979) is a Ukrainian football manager and former player.
