= FC Lyubomyr Stavyshche =

Lyubomyr Stavyshche
- Full name: Football Club Lyubomyr Stavyshche
- Founded: 2004
- Ground: Kolos Stadium, Stavyshche
- Chairman: Leonid Dzhuzhyk
- Manager: Vadym Lazorenko
- League: Ukrainian Second League
- 2020–21: Ukrainian Amateur League, Group 2, 10th of 11 (promoted)
- Website: http://fclubomir.org.ua/
Home colours	Away colours

Football Club Lyubomyr Stavyshche (Ukrainian: Футбольний клуб «Любомир») is a professional Ukrainian football club from the urban-type settlement of Stavyshche. The team is currently playing Ukrainian Second League after competing in the Ukrainian Amateur championship.

Logo until 2021

== History ==
The team was founded in 2004 as a football school for rural youth. For several seasons the club was fielding its teams in national youth competitions as well as competitions of Kyiv Oblast. The club also fields its under-19 team in the PFL competitions among under-19 teams. In 2020–21 it debuted at national amateur competitions of the AAFU placing 10th among 11 teams. "Lyubomyr" debuted in the Ukrainian Second League in the 2021–22 season.

== League and cup history ==
Season	Div.	Pos.	Pl.	W	D	L	GS	GA	P	Domestic Cup	Europe	Notes
2020–21	4th	10	20	3	4	13	21	24	13			Promoted
2021–22	3rd											

== Players ==
=== Current squad ===
As of 27 May 2022

Note: Flags indicate national team as defined under FIFA eligibility rules; some limited exceptions apply. Players may hold more than one non-FIFA nationality.

No.	Pos.	Nation	Player
4	DF	UKR	Yehor Popov
5	MF	UKR	Artem Kyyanytsya
8	MF	UKR	Ivan Melnychenko
10	MF	UKR	Ioan Kravchenko
12	MF	UKR	Zakhar Dobrovolskyi (on loan from Dinaz Vyshhorod)
13	MF	UKR	Denys Bondar
14	DF	UKR	Vadym Nadobenko
15	DF	UKR	Andriy Marchuk (on loan from Kolos Kovalivka)
16	DF	UKR	Anatoliy Voronin
17	MF	GEO	Luka Nadiradze

No.	Pos.	Nation	Player
18	MF	UKR	Andriy Yurchenko
20	MF	UKR	Dmytro Zhdanov
22	GK	UKR	Rostyslav Sydorenko
25	FW	UKR	Illya Tereshchenko
28	DF	UKR	Vladyslav Bobrov
29	DF	UKR	Dmytriy Melnychuk
30	MF	UKR	Serhiy Shyshkin
—	MF	UKR	Vladyslav Pavlenko

== Managers ==
- 2011–2014 Maksym Shtayer
- 2015–201? Artem Illichov
- 2020–2021 Vitaliy Bilokon
- 2021 Oleksandr Honcharov
- 2021 – Vadym Lazorenko
