= Evgeniy Yarovenko =

Kazakhstani and Ukrainian footballer (born 1963)

Evgeny Yarovenko
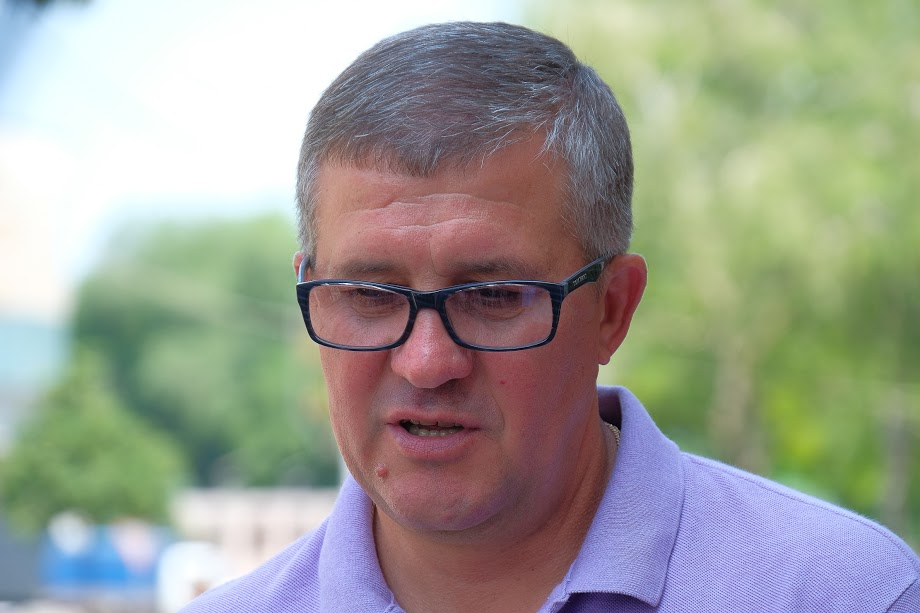
- Yarovenko in 2018

Personal information
- Full name: Evgeny Viktorovich Yarovenko; Yevhen Viktorovych Yarovenko
- Date of birth: 17 August 1963 (age 63)
- Place of birth: Chulaktau, Kazakh SSR, Soviet Union
- Height: 1.85 m (6 ft 1 in)
- Position: Defender

Team information
- Current team: Sumy (manager)

Youth career
- 1979–1980: Fosforit Karatau
- 1981–1982: Khimik Zhambyl

Senior career*
Years	Team	Apps	(Gls)
1981–1983	Khimik Zhambyl	77	(4)
1984–1988	Kairat	129	(11)
1989–1991	Dnipro Dnipropetrovsk	44	(3)
1991	Rotor Volgograd	13	(1)
1992	Vorskla Poltava	0	(0)
1992	Nyva Ternopil	2	(0)
1992	Kontu	22	(1)
1993	Dnipro Dnipropetrovsk	3	(0)
1993–1994	Sarıyer	34	(0)
1995	Torpedo Volzhskiy	9	(0)
1995	Kryvbas Kryvyi Rih	7	(1)
1995–1996	Metalurh Zaporizhzhia	17	(0)

International career
1987–1988	Soviet Union Olympic	9	(0)
1987	Soviet Union	2	(0)

Managerial career
- 1996–1997: Kryvbas Kryvyi Rih (assistant)
- 1998–1999: Torpedo Zaporizhzhia (assistant)
- 1999: Torpedo Zaporizhzhia
- 1999–2001: Dnipro Dnipropetrovsk (assistant)
- 2002: Shakhtar-2 Donetsk (assistant)
- 2003–2004: Shakhtar-3 Donetsk
- 2006–2008: Esil Bogatyr
- 2007–2008: Kazakhstan U21
- 2011–2013: Naftovyk-Ukrnafta Okhtyrka
- 2014–2015: Taraz
- 2018–2019: Metalurh Zaporizhzhia (assistant)
- 2020: Peremoha Dnipro
- 2021: Nikopol
- 2022–: Sumy
Medal record
Men's football
Gold medal – first place	1988 Seoul	Team
- * Club domestic league appearances and goals

Evgeny Viktorovich Yarovenko (Russian: Евгений Викторович Яровенко; Ukrainian: Євген Вікторович Яровенко, romanized: Yevhen Viktorovych Yarovenko; born 17 August 1963) is a Kazakhstani and Ukrainian football manager and former player who manages Sumy.

== Personal life ==
He is the father of Ukrainian footballer Oleksandr Yarovenko.

== Career statistics ==
Appearances and goals by club, season and competition
Club	Season	League		
Club	Season	Division	Apps	Goals
Khimik Zhambyl	1983	Soviet Second LeagueI		
FC Kairat	1984	Soviet Top League	29	0
FC Kairat	1985	Soviet Top League	32	2
FC Kairat	1986	Soviet Top League	28	4
FC Kairat	1987	Soviet Top League	19	5
FC Kairat	1988	Soviet Top League	21	0
Dnipro Dnipropetrovsk	1989	Soviet Top League	20	2
Dnipro Dnipropetrovsk	1990	Soviet Top League	18	1
Dnipro Dnipropetrovsk	1991	Soviet Top League	6	0
Rotor Volgograd	1991	Soviet First League	13	1
Nyva Ternopil	1992	Ukrainian Premier League	2	0
FC Kontu	1992	Kakkonen	22	1
Dnipro Dnipropetrovsk	1992–93	Ukrainian Premier League	3	0
Sarıyer	1992–93	Süper Lig	24	0
Sarıyer	1993–94	TFF First League	10	0
Torpedo Volzhskiy	1995	Russian First Division	9	0
Kryvbas Kryvyi Rih	1995–96	Ukrainian Premier League	7	1
Metalurh Zaporizhzhia	1995–96	Ukrainian Premier League	8	0
Metalurh Zaporizhzhia	1996–97	Ukrainian Premier League	9	0
