= Valeriy Kutsenko =

Ukrainian footballer

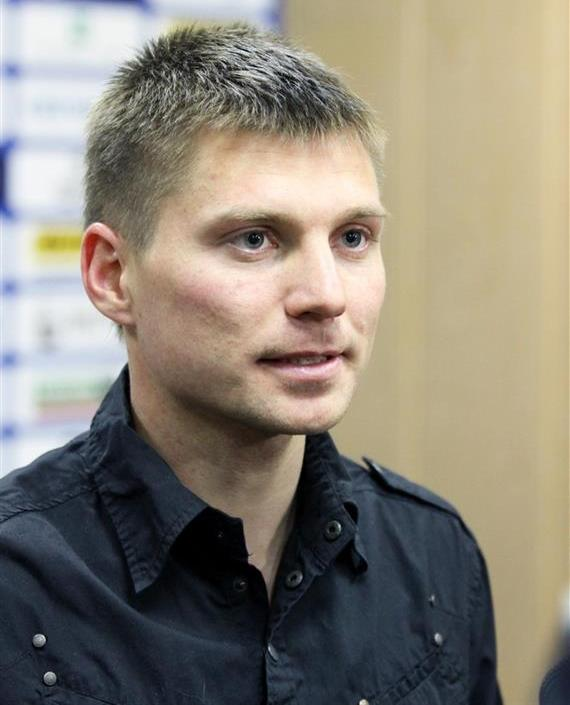

Personal information
- Full name: Valeriy Viktorovych Kutsenko
- Date of birth: 2 November 1986 (age 40)
- Place of birth: Kremenchuk, Ukrainian SSR
- Height: 1.74 m (5 ft 8 1/2 in)
- Position: Midfielder

Team information
- Current team: Vorskla Poltava (caretaker)

Senior career*
Years	Team	Apps	(Gls)
2003–2006	Dnipro Dnipropetrovsk	0	(0)
2003–2005	→ Dnipro-2 Dnipropetrovsk	24	(3)
2006–2010	Obolon Kyiv	101	(23)
2007	→ Obolon-2 Kyiv	4	(2)
2010–2012	Kryvbas Kryvyi Rih	20	(1)
2012	Dinamo Brest	12	(3)
2013	Vorskla Poltava	10	(0)
2014	Minsk	15	(1)
2014	Daugava Daugavpils	9	(2)
2015	AZAL	14	(2)
2015–2016	Chornomorets Odesa	22	(1)
2017	Mykolaiv	13	(1)
2017–2018	Speranța Nisporeni	24	(1)
2019	Keşla	11	(0)
2019	Avanhard Kramatorsk	8	(0)
2020	Sumy	13	(2)
2022–2023	Druzhba Ocheretuvate	18	(6)
Total		300	(42)

International career
2003	Ukraine U17	4	(0)
2003	Ukraine U18	2	(0)

Managerial career
- 2020–2021: Sumy (assistant)
- 2021: Sumy
- 2022–2023: Kremin Kremenchuk (assistant)
- 2023–2025: Hirnyk-Sport Horishni Plavni
- 2025: Vorskla Poltava (assistant)
- 2025–: Vorskla Poltava (caretaker)
- * Club domestic league appearances and goals

Valeriy Viktorovych Kutsenko (Ukrainian: Валерій Вікторович Куценко; born 2 November 1986) is a Ukrainian retired professional football player and current manager.

== Career ==
He was the top goalscorer for FC Obolon Kyiv in the 2008–09 season.

In 2020, Kutsenko joined FC Sumy, where he both acted as a player and assistant coach.

== Managerial career ==
In March 2021, Kutsenko was appointed manager of Sumy.

Before the start of the 2022–23 season, Kutsenko joined Ukrainian First League club FC Kremin Kremenchuk as an assistant coach. He left at the end of the season to be appointed manager at neighboring club FC Hirnyk-Sport Horishni Plavni.

On 10 October 2025, Kutsenko was announced as the caretaker manager of Vorskla Poltava.
