= Maksym Pokotylyuk =

Ukrainian footballer

Personal information
- Full name: Maksym Vasylyovych Pokotylyuk
- Date of birth: 21 February 1988 (age 38)
- Place of birth: Naberezhnye Chelny, Soviet Union (now Russia)
- Height: 1.84 m (6 ft 0 in)
- Position: Central midfielder

Team information
- Current team: Bucha

Youth career
- 2001–2003: Illichivets Mariupol

Senior career*
| Years | Team | Apps | (Gls) |
| 2006–2008 | Illichivets Mariupol | 0 | (0) |
| 2007 | → Illichivets-2 Mariupol | 0 | (0) |
| 2010–2011 | Orlicz Suchedniów | 15 | (5) |
| 2011–2013 | Polonia Bytom | 16 | (0) |
| 2012 | → Skra Częstochowa (loan) | 12 | (1) |
| 2014 | Avanhard Kramatorsk | 6 | (0) |
| 2014–2015 | Stal Kraśnik | 16 | (3) |
| 2015 | Gelb-Weiß Görlitz | 3 | (0) |
| 2015–2016 | Avanhard Kramatorsk | 20 | (0) |
| 2016 | Inhulets Petrove | 18 | (3) |
| 2016 | → Inhulets-2 Petrove | 1 | (0) |
| 2017 | Bukovyna Chernivtsi | 13 | (1) |
| 2017–2018 | Poltava | 32 | (2) |
| 2018–2023 | Obolon Kyiv | 81 | (5) |
| 2023–2026 | Viktoriya Sumy | 21 | (0) |
| 2026 | Druzhba-Kozaky | 0 | (0) |
| 2026– | Bucha | 0 | (0) |
- * Club domestic league appearances and goals as of 5 September 2026

Maksym Vasylyovych Pokotylyuk (Ukrainian: Максим Васильович Покотилюк; born 21 February 1988) is a Ukrainian professional footballer who plays as a central midfielder for Ukrainian club Bucha.
