= Elektrometalurh Stadium =

Multi-use stadium in Nikopol, Ukraine

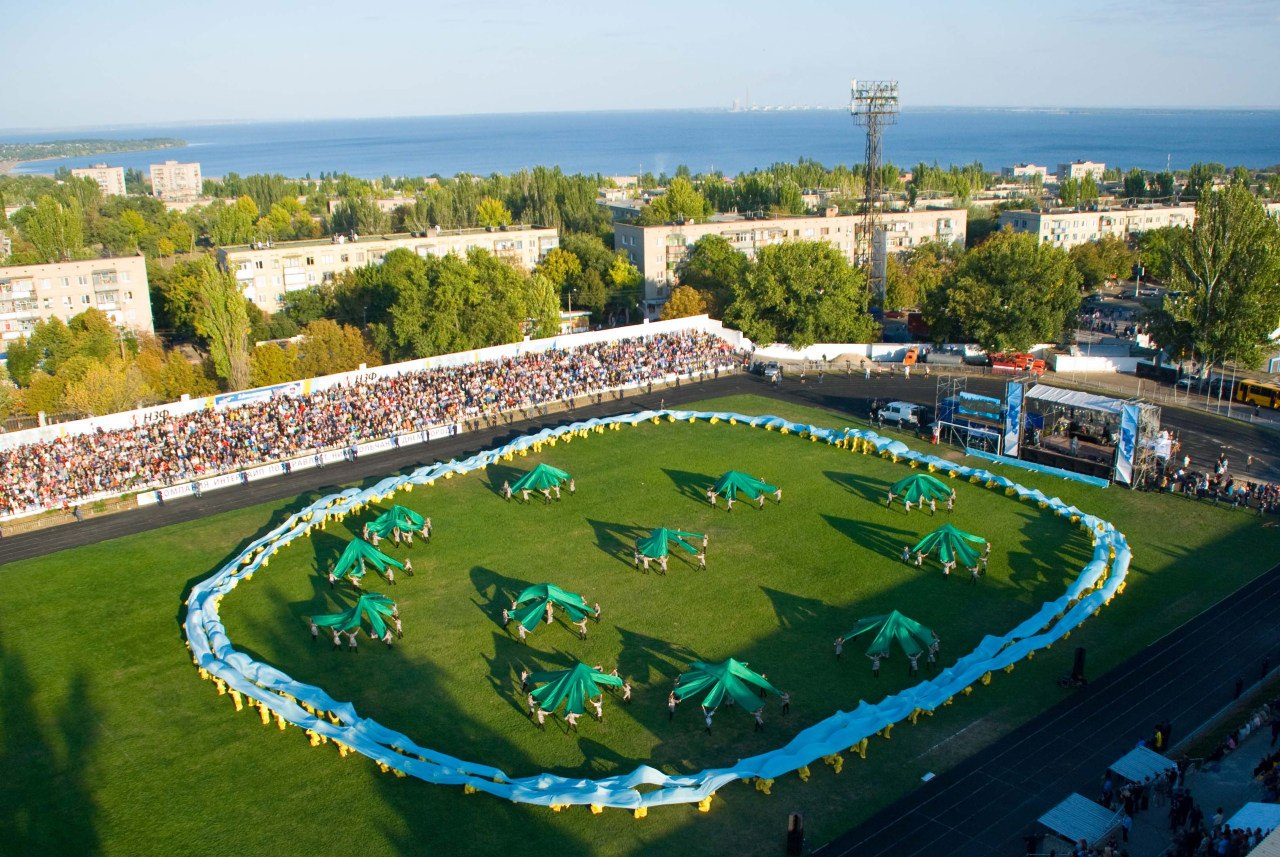
- Interactive map of Elektrometalurh Stadium
- Location: Nikopol, Ukraine
- Coordinates: 47°33′44.56″N 34°23′33.49″E
- Owner: Nikopol Factory of Ferrous Alloys
- Capacity: 7,200 (football)
- Surface: Grass
- Field size: 105m by 68m

Elektrometalurh Stadium is a multi-use stadium in Nikopol, Ukraine. The stadium holds 7,200 people.

The stadium is located close to the Kakhovka Reservoir in the city's Park Peremohy.

The stadium was a home stadium of FC Metalurh Nikopol. Currently it houses FC Nikopol.

== Gallery ==
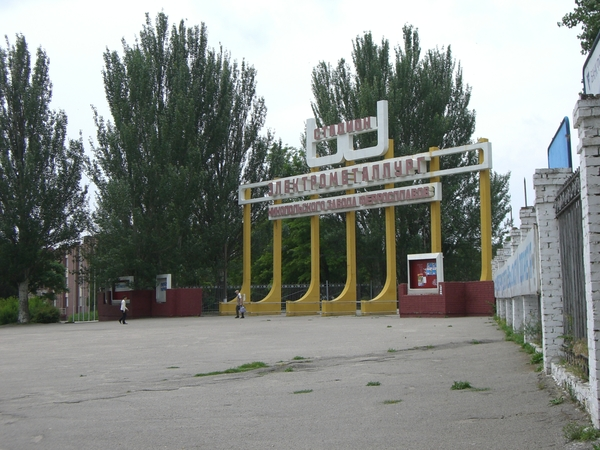

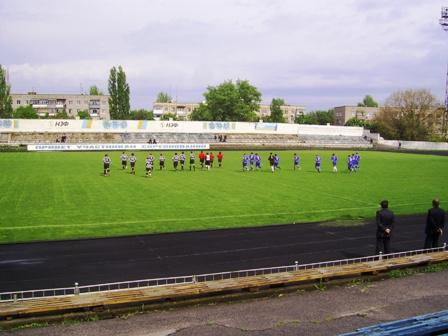
