= Serhiy Kravchenko (footballer, born 1990) =

Ukrainian footballer

Personal information
- Full name: Serhiy Oleksandrovych Kravchenko
- Date of birth: 23 March 1990 (age 36)
- Place of birth: Ulianivka, Kherson Oblast, Soviet Union (now Ukraine)
- Height: 1.76 m (5 ft 9 1/2 in)
- Position: Striker

Team information
- Current team: Unia Solec Kujawski
- Number: 21

Youth career
- 2004: UOR Donetsk
- 2007: Metalurh Zaporizhzhia

Senior career*
Years	Team	Apps	(Gls)
2007–2010	Hirnyk-Sport Komsomolsk	77	(19)
2010–2011	Vorskla Poltava	0	(0)
2011–2014	Tytan Armyansk	87	(23)
2014–2018	Helios Kharkiv	107	(26)
2018–2022	Mykolaiv	91	(27)
2022	Tavriya Simferopol	0	(0)
2022–2023	Hetman Zamość	26	(14)
2023–	Unia Solec Kujawski	49	(11)

International career
- Ukraine (students)
- * Club domestic league appearances and goals as of 22 June 2024

Serhiy Kravchenko (Ukrainian: Сергі́й Олекса́ндрович Кра́вченко; born 23 March 1990 in Kherson Oblast, Ukrainian SSR) is a Ukrainian professional footballer who plays as a striker for Polish IV liga Kuyavia-Pomerania club Unia Solec Kujawski.

== Career ==
Kravchenko is the product of the UOR Donetsk and Metalurh Zaporizhzhia School Systems. He spent most of his career as a player in different clubs of the Ukrainian First League and the Ukrainian Second League. He began in Hirnyk-Sport Komsomolsk in the Ukrainian Second League, and was signed by Ukrainian Premier League club Vorskla Poltava, but did not play in any game for this side. In July 2011, he signed a contract with Tytan Armyansk.
