= Yuvileiny Stadium =

Football stadium in Sumy, Ukraine

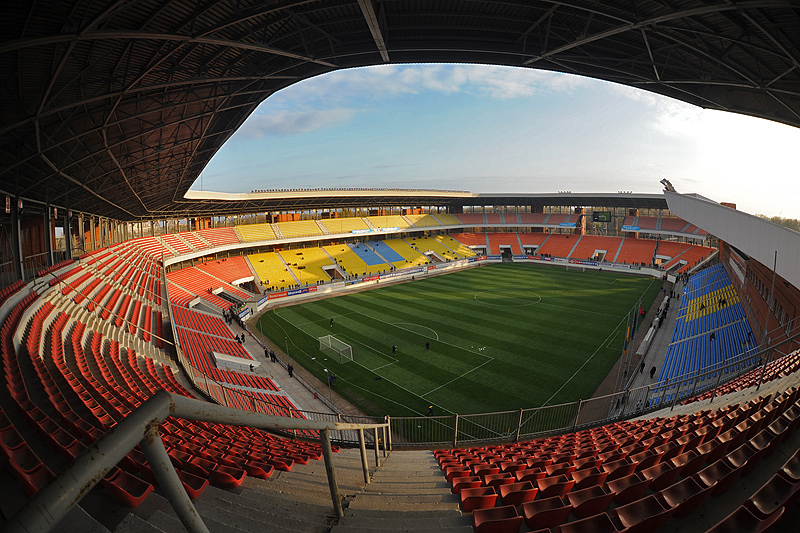
- Interactive map of Yuvileiny Stadium
- Former names: Spartak Stadium (1949–1989)
- Location: Ukraine 40030, Sumy, Vulytsia Haharina 9
- Coordinates: 50°54′8″N 34°47′59″E
- Owner: PJSC "Spartak" (2001–2007); City of Sumy (2007–present)
- Operator: City of Sumy
- Capacity: 25,830
- Surface: Grass
- Scoreboard: 3.69 × 5.94 (m) "Videoton" (Hungary)
- Field size: 105 m × 68 m (344 ft × 223 ft)

Construction
- Groundbreaking: September 2, 1999
- Opened: 20 September 2001; 25 years ago
- Renovated: 2001 (rebuilt completely)
- Cost: ₴ 50,000,000+
- Architect: ?
- Project manager: PJSC "Spartak"
- Structural engineer: "Tsivilproektrestavratsia" ("Ukraniiproektrekonstruktsia")
- Services engineer: "Stroimashservis" (groundwork)
- General contractor: PPKMP "NASA"
- Main contractors: "Sumykhimprom" (southern stand) "Agropromstroi" (eastern stand) "Sumy machine-building Frunze Production Complex" (northern stand)

Tenants
- FC Spartak Sumy (2001–2007); PFC Sumy (2009–2019); FC Alians Lypova Dolyna (2019–2022); FC Sumy (2019–present); FC Viktoriya Sumy (2023–present)

Website
- fc.sumy.ua

Yuvileiny Stadium is a football stadium in Sumy, Ukraine. It serves as home grounds for Ukrainian First League club FC Viktoriya Sumy, and as a secondary venue for Ukrainian Second League club FC Sumy, whose main field is Avangarde Stadium. With a capacity of 25,830 spectators, it is the 7th largest stadium in Ukraine. The stadium opened in 2001 within Sumy's Kozhedub Park.

The stadium hosted the 2009 Ukrainian Super Cup between Dynamo Kyiv and Vorskla Poltava and the 2011 Ukrainian Cup final between Dynamo Kyiv and Shakhtar Donetsk. Otherwise, the stadium hosts most of Viktoriya's matches in the Ukrainian First League as well as some important home matches for FC Sumy. The stadium's first match held an attendance record of about 29,300 spectators when Spartak Sumy played Naftovyk Okhtyrka in 2003.

== History ==
Yuvileiny Stadium is located nearby Kozhedub Park near downtown Sumy. Prior to its construction, on the site of Yuvileiny was Spartak Stadium, built in 1949. In 1968, it was extensively reconstructed to accommodate 12,000 spectators, and in the late 80s it was demolished in order to build a new stadium capable of holding 35,000 spectators.

The stadium project was developed by Ukrainian architects Volodymyr Bykov and Ivan Lukash, for which they were awarded the State Prize of Ukraine. Construction of the new arena began on September 2, 1999, when the first pylon was hammered in. The stadium was officially opened on September 20, 2001, shortly after the celebration of the 10th anniversary of Ukraine's independence and on the eve of the 350th anniversary of Sumy, which was founded in 1652. At the time of opening, the stadium officially accommodated about 28,000 spectators. Initially, some of these spectating places were standing only. However, subsequently, all these spots were equipped with individual seats. Almost all of the stadium's areas for spectators are under a canopy, with the exception of the first rows of the lower tier.

On July 11, 2009, the stadium hosted a match for the 2009 Ukrainian Super Cup between Dynamo Kyiv and Vorskla Poltava. Yuvileiny also hosted the Final of the Ukrainian Cup between Dynamo Kyiv and Shakhtar Donetsk on May 25, 2011, with a total of 27,800 spectators.

On July 22, 2016, the Executive Committee of the Football Federation of Ukraine decided to hold the final of the Ukrainian Cup in Sumy. But under a number of conditions, such as increasing the number of seats to 30,000 seats, bringing the stadium and territory in line with regulatory standards, completing work on the installation of a fire system, this happened to not be the case. On December 13, 2016, information was published that Kharkiv took away from Sumy the right to host the final of the cup.

On August 20, 2016, the stadium hosted a Premier League match between Olympic Donetsk and Olexandria. After that, Olympic decided to hold all of their home matches of the first round of the Ukrainian Cup at Yubileiny.

In 2018–2020, Amateur League club LSG Syrovatka began to host their home matches at the stadium, and subsequently in 2020 the club was renamed to FC Sumy.

== Characteristics ==
The territory of the stadium is 1 hectare (2.5 acres), while the constructed territory amasses to 15,960 square metres (171,800 sq ft). The drainage system and the field-heating system were installed by Eleter, while the stadium lighting is ensured by Vatra. The field scoreboard is made by Videoton.

The administrative building is 106.4 meters by 14.9 meters, while the training hall is 164.2 square metres (1,767 sq ft).
