= AFSC Kyiv =

Ukrainian football club

Akademiya Futbolu SC Kyiv
- Full name: Akademiya Futbolu Sportyvnyi Klub Kyiv
- Founded: 2020
- Ground: Urban Sport Сity Arsenal, Kyiv
- Capacity: 1,500
- Chairman: Volodymyr Vasylenko
- Head coach: Vyacheslav Nivinskyi
- League: Ukrainian Second League
- 2020–21: Ukrainian Amateur League, Group 2, 9th of 11 (promoted)
- Website: https://www.afsckyiv.com/
Home colours	Away colours

Akademiya Futbolu SC Kyiv (Ukrainian: Академія футболу СК «Київ») is a Ukrainian professional football club from Kyiv. The club is based at the Kyiv's elite Pechersk neighborhood based at the former Kyiv Arsenal factory stadium.

== History ==
The club's first team was created in 2020 based on DYuSSh Chаmpion Kyiv (sports school) and since 2017 was named as Chаmpion of Kyiv playing in competitions among under-19 teams (U–19 Championship). The club debuted with its first team in the 2020–21 Ukrainian Football Amateur League playing its home games in the Kyiv's suburb of Vyshneve.

The club plans to finish its sports complex in August 2021 that should accommodate athletes of six various types of sports. The new sports complex will accommodate up to 1,500 stadium spectators. It also will accommodate athletes of association football, tennis, martial arts, chess, cybersports, and athletics.

=== Names ===
- 2018–2020 Champion Kyiv (youth competitions only)
- 2020–present AFSC Kyiv

== Players ==
=== Current squad ===
As of 27 July 2023

Note: Flags indicate national team as defined under FIFA eligibility rules; some limited exceptions apply. Players may hold more than one non-FIFA nationality.

No.	Pos.	Nation	Player
2	MF	UKR	Heorhiy Semchuk
4	DF	UKR	Dmytro Zelenko
5	DF	UKR	Semen Klyuchyk
6	MF	UKR	Mykola Vechurko
7	MF	UKR	Bohdan Olabyn
10	MF	UKR	Mykola Neskey
11	FW	UKR	Vladyslav Harnaha
13	GK	UKR	Maksym Prymachenko
15	DF	UKR	Kyrylo Rudovskyi
16	MF	UKR	Ihor Sydorenko

No.	Pos.	Nation	Player
17	MF	UKR	Bohdan Nahayskyi
18	MF	UKR	Serhiy Koshlyak
19	DF	UKR	Oleksiy Berezynets
20	DF	UKR	Dmytro Rohulskyi
21	FW	UKR	Oleksandr Studinikin
22	DF	UKR	Bohdan Kurtyak
23	MF	UKR	Vladyslav Royenko
70	DF	UKR	Oleksandr Shevchuk
71	GK	UKR	Kiril Martsiyash
99	FW	UKR	Eduard Finchenko

== Managers ==
- (Ukraine) Anatoliy Sidenko (2020 – 2021)
- (Ukraine) Vyacheslav Nivinskyi (2021 – present)
