= MFA Mukachevo =

MFA Mukacheve
- Full name: Munkacs Futbal'na Akadémia Mukacheve
- Founded: 2005
- Ground: Avanhard
- Capacity: 3,000
- Chairman: Zoltán Szilvási
- Manager: Vitaliy Shumskyi
- League: Ukrainian Second League
- 2020–21: Ukrainian Amateur League, Group 1, 8th (promoted)
- Website: https://mfa-munkach.com.ua/
Home colours	Away colours

Munkacs Football Academy Mukachevo (Ukrainian: "Мункач футбольна академія" Мукачеве) is a Ukrainian football team from Mukachevo, Zakarpattia Oblast. The club was formed in 2005 as the children and youth football club "Mukachevo". The club represents the Hungarian diaspora in Ukraine and is supported by Kisvárda FC from the neighboring city of Kisvárda, Mukachevo's twin town.

The club started out as a football academy fielding its teams in various youth competitions including "Leather ball" competitions, regional, national, and international competitions. Since 2014 the club started to field its senior team in regional football competitions of Zakarpattia Oblast.

== Honors ==
=== Ukraine ===
- Zakarpattia Oblast championship
- Winners (3): 2007, 2008, 2012

== Current squad ==
As of 10 August 2023

Note: Flags indicate national team as defined under FIFA eligibility rules; some limited exceptions apply. Players may hold more than one non-FIFA nationality.

No.	Pos.	Nation	Player
4	DF	UKR	Dmytro Dobranskyi
5	FW	UKR	Anatoliy Snyozyk
7	MF	UKR	Vitaliy Trachuk
9	MF	UKR	Myroslav Bundash
11	MF	UKR	Taras Halas
19	MF	UKR	Viktor Trachuk

No.	Pos.	Nation	Player
22	MF	UKR	Yuriy Klimkovskyi
24	MF	UKR	Vladyslav Ivancho
34	DF	UKR	Stanislav Chepa
44	DF	UKR	Yevhen Oberman
97	MF	UKR	Lyubomyr Stepanchuk
—	MF	UKR	Vitaliy Dubiley

== Managers ==
- (Ukraine) Viktor Ryashko (2018 — 19 July 2020)
- (Ukraine) Viktor Yaichnyk (20 July 2020 — 25 May 2021)
- (Ukraine) Vitaliy Shumskyi (25 May 2021 — present)

== Notable players ==
Players who have played in the club and who have distinguished themselves in some higher leagues.

- (Ukraine) Oleksandr Pyshchur

== See also ==
- FC Karpaty Mukacheve
- FC Zakarpattia Uzhhorod
- FC Fetrovyk Khust
