= FC Sumy =

Professional association football club based in Sumy, Ukraine

Football Club Sumy
- Full name: Футбольний клуб "Суми"
- Founded: 2016; 10 years ago
- Ground: Yuvileiny Stadium, Sumy; Avanhard Stadium, Sumy
- Capacity: 25,830
- President: Hennadiy Demyanenko
- Head coach: Evgeniy Yarovenko
- League: Ukrainian Second League
- 2020–21: Ukrainian Amateur League, Group 3, 3rd of 12 (promoted)
- Website: fclsgroup.com

Football Club Sumy is an association football club based in Sumy, Ukraine. It was formed when LSG Syrovatka adopted the new name FC Sumy and a variation of the city's coat of arms for its logo.

== History ==
The football club was established in January 2016 in the village Verkhnya Syrovatka, Sumy as LSG Syrovatka. The club was named after a law firm LS Group which is headed by its president Hennadiy Demyanenko. Since 2019–20 season the main team began to play its home games in Sumy. On 3 March 2020 the football club was renamed to FC Sumy. The club's leadership emphasizes that it has no relation to the original PFC Sumy that was liquidated in 2019.

== Honours ==
- Sumy Oblast Championship
  - Winner (1): 2019
- Sumy Oblast Cup
  - Winner (1): 2018
  - Runners-up (1): 2019
- Sumy Oblast Super Cup
  - Winner (1): 2020

== Current squad ==
As of 15 June 2022

Note: Flags indicate national team as defined under FIFA eligibility rules; some limited exceptions apply. Players may hold more than one non-FIFA nationality.

No.	Pos.	Nation	Player
5	MF	UKR	Pavlo Milyesin
7	MF	UKR	Vladyslav Babanin
9	MF	UKR	Mykyta Asyeyev

No.	Pos.	Nation	Player
20	MF	UKR	Ihor Chenakal
27	MF	UKR	Artem Haleta
94	DF	UKR	Yevheniy Moroz (captain)

== League and cup history ==
Season	Div.	Pos.	Pl.	W	D	L	GS	GA	P	Domestic Cup	Europe	Notes
Regional Level (2016–2020) as LS Group Verkhnia Syrovatka
2020–21	4th (Amateur League)	4	22	17	0	5	49	20	51			
2021–22	3rd (Second League)											

== Coaches ==
- (Ukraine) Serhiy Strashnenko (2020 – 2021)
- (Ukraine) Valeriy Kutsenko (30 March 2021 – 14 October 2021)
- (Ukraine) Evgeny Yarovenko (19 January 2022 – present)

== See also ==
- PFC Sumy
- Spartak Sumy
