= List of Ukrainian football transfers summer 2019 =

This is a list of Ukrainian football transfers summer 2019. Only clubs in 2019–20 Ukrainian Premier League and 2019–20 Ukrainian First League are included.

== Ukrainian Premier League ==
=== Desna Chernihiv ===
In:

No.	Pos.	Nation	Player
—	GK	UKR	Kostyantyn Makhnovskyi (loan return from Olimpik Donetsk)
—	DF	UKR	Yukhym Konoplya (on loan from Shakhtar Donetsk)
—	DF	UKR	Vitaliy Pryndeta (from (Russia) SKA-Khabarovsk)
—	DF	UKR	Vitaliy Yermakov (loan return from Avanhard Kramatorsk)
—	DF	UKR	Artur Zapadnya (from Volyn Lutsk)
—	MF	UKR	Maksym Banasevych (loan return from Kolos Kovalivka)
—	MF	UKR	Andriy Dombrovskyi (from Arsenal Kyiv)
—	MF	UKR	Vladyslav Kalitvintsev (from Arsenal Kyiv)
—	MF	UKR	Orest Kuzyk (on loan from (Greece) PAS Giannina)
—	FW	UKR	Maksym Dehtyarov (on loan from Olimpik Donetsk)
—	FW	UKR	Ihor Kirienko (loan return from Avanhard Kramatorsk)
—	FW	UKR	Illya Shevtsov (from Shakhtar Donetsk)

Out:

No.	Pos.	Nation	Player
—	GK	UKR	Kostyantyn Makhnovskyi (to (Latvia) Ventspils)
—	DF	UKR	Serhiy Lyulka (to FC Lviv)
—	DF	UKR	Dmytro Nyemchaninov (to Rukh Lviv)
—	DF	UKR	Temur Partsvania
—	DF	UKR	Andriy Slinkin (to MFC Mykolaiv)
—	MF	UKR	Maksym Banasevych (to Rukh Lviv)
—	MF	UKR	Vadym Bovtruk (on loan to Dinaz Vyshhorod)
—	MF	UKR	Mykhaylo Kozak (to (Georgia (country)) Shevardeni-1906 Tbilisi)
—	MF	UKR	Oleksandr Volkov (on loan to Kolos Kovalivka)
—	MF	UKR	Andriy Yakymiv (to (Hungary) Kaposvári Rákóczi)
—	FW	UKR	Denys Bezborodko (loan return to Shakhtar Donetsk)
—	FW	UKR	Ihor Kirienko (to Avanhard Kramatorsk)
—	FW	UKR	Mykhaylo Serhiychuk (to (Latvia) Ventspils)

=== Dnipro-1 ===
In:

No.	Pos.	Nation	Player
—	DF	SEN	Papa Gueye (from Karpaty Lviv)
—	MF	UKR	Serhiy Buletsa (on loan from Dynamo Kyiv)
—	MF	UKR	Kostiantyn Domaratskyi (from Chornomorets Odesa)
—	MF	GEO	Aleksandre Kobakhidze (from Vorskla Poltava)
—	MF	UKR	Dmytro Korkishko (from (Turkey) Hatayspor)
—	MF	SUI	Griffin Sabatini (free agent)
—	MF	UKR	Yuriy Vakulko (from (Serbia) Partizan)
—	FW	CAN	Aramis Kouzine (from Obolon-Brovar Kyiv)
—	FW	UKR	Vladyslav Supriaha (on loan from Dynamo Kyiv)

Out:

No.	Pos.	Nation	Player
—	DF	UKR	Serhiy Chebotayev (to Veres Rivne)
—	DF	UKR	Zurab Ochigava (loan return to Dynamo Kyiv)
—	MF	UKR	Yuriy Brovchenko (to Obolon-Brovar Kyiv)
—	MF	UKR	Kamil Khuchbarov (to Kolos Kovalivka)
—	MF	UKR	Orest Kuzyk (loan return to (Greece) PAS Giannina)
—	MF	UKR	Serhiy Panasenko (to Mykolaiv)
—	FW	UKR	Yaroslav Homenko (to Hirnyk Kryvyi Rih)
—	FW	UKR	Oleh Kozhushko (on loan to Kolos Kovalivka)
—	FW	UKR	Vadym Yavorskyi (to Avanhard Kramatorsk)

=== Dynamo Kyiv ===
In:

No.	Pos.	Nation	Player
—	GK	UKR	Maksym Koval (loan return from (Saudi Arabia) Al-Fateh)
—	DF	UKR	Vladyslav Dubinchak (loan return from Arsenal Kyiv)
—	DF	UKR	Pavlo Lukyanchuk (loan return from (Hungary) Kisvárda)
—	DF	UKR	Oleksandr Melnyk (loan return from Oleksandriya)
—	DF	UKR	Mykola Morozyuk (loan return from (Turkey) Rizespor)
—	DF	UKR	Zurab Ochigava (loan return from Dnipro-1)
—	DF	UKR	Oleksandr Osman (loan return from Arsenal Kyiv)
—	DF	SRB	Aleksandar Pantić (loan return from (Spain) Cádiz)
—	DF	PER	Carlos Zambrano (loan return from (Switzerland) Basel)
—	MF	GHA	Mohammed Kadiri (from Austria Wien)
—	MF	UKR	Ivan Kaliuzhnyi (loan return from Metalist 1925 Kharkiv)
—	MF	UKR	Oleksandr Karavayev (from Zorya Luhansk)
—	MF	BLR	Nikita Korzun (loan return from (Saudi Arabia) Al-Fateh)
—	MF	UKR	Bohdan Mykhaylychenko (loan return from Zorya Luhansk)
—	MF	UKR	Pavlo Orikhovskyi (loan return from Arsenal Kyiv)
—	MF	LUX	Gerson Rodrigues (from (Japan) Júbilo Iwata)
—	MF	UKR	Denys Yanakov (loan return from Arsenal Kyiv)
—	FW	UKR	Vladyslav Alekseyev (loan return from Arsenal Kyiv)
—	FW	UKR	Artem Khotsyanovskyi (loan return from Avanhard Kramatorsk)
—	FW	UKR	Danyil Sukhoruchko (loan return from Arsenal Kyiv)

Out:

No.	Pos.	Nation	Player
—	GK	UKR	Maksym Koval (to (Saudi Arabia) Al-Fateh)
—	GK	UKR	Artur Rudko (to (Cyprus) Pafos)
—	DF	UKR	Akhmed Alibekov (on loan to (Czech Republic) Slovan Liberec)
—	DF	UKR	Alan Aussi (on loan to (Czech Republic) Slovan Liberec)
—	DF	UKR	Vladyslav Dubinchak (on loan to Karpaty Lviv)
—	DF	UKR	Pavlo Lukyanchuk (to Olimpik Donetsk)
—	DF	UKR	Zurab Ochigava (to Vorskla Poltava)
—	DF	UKR	Oleksandr Osman (to Metalist 1925 Kharkiv)
—	DF	SRB	Aleksandar Pantić
—	DF	UKR	Mykola Morozyuk (to (Turkey) Rizespor)
—	MF	UKR	Serhiy Buletsa (on loan to Dnipro-1)
—	MF	UKR	Ivan Kaliuzhnyi (on loan to Rukh Lviv)
—	MF	BLR	Nikita Korzun (on loan to (Portugal) Vilafranquense)
—	MF	UKR	Bohdan Mykhaylychenko (to Zorya Luhansk)
—	MF	UKR	Pavlo Orikhovskyi (to Kolos Kovalivka)
—	MF	UKR	Oleksandr Petrusenko (to Hirnyk-Sport Horishni Plavni)
—	MF	UKR	Yuriy Shpyrka (on loan to Prykarpattia Ivano-Frankivsk)
—	MF	UKR	Yevhen Smyrnyi (on loan to Kolos Kovalivka)
—	FW	UKR	Vladyslav Alekseyev
—	FW	UKR	Artem Khotsyanovskyi ((on loan?) to Hirnyk-Sport Horishni Plavni)
—	FW	UKR	Nazariy Rusyn (on loan to Zorya Luhansk)
—	FW	UKR	Vladyslav Supriaha (on loan to Dnipro-1)

=== Karpaty Lviv ===
In:

No.	Pos.	Nation	Player
—	GK	UKR	Oleh Kudryk (on loan from Shakhtar Donetsk)
—	GK	UKR	Roman Pidkivka (from Arsenal Kyiv)
—	DF	LUX	Marvin da Graça (from (Luxembourg) Progrès Niederkorn)
—	DF	UKR	Vladyslav Dubinchak (on loan from Dynamo Kyiv)
—	DF	LUX	Tim Hall (from (Luxembourg) Progrès Niederkorn)
—	DF	UKR	Oleksandr Kucher (from (Turkey) Kayserispor)
—	DF	CRO	Franjo Prce (from (Cyprus) Omonia)
—	DF	UKR	Serhiy Vakulenko (from Shakhtar Donetsk)
—	DF	UKR	Oleh Veremiyenko (loan return from Kalush)
—	MF	UKR	Maksym Hrysyo (loan return from Rukh Vynnyky)
—	MF	UKR	Artem Kozak (from Arsenal Kyiv)
—	MF	FIN	Abukar Mohamed (on loan from (Italy) Lazio)
—	MF	UKR	Yehor Nazaryna (on loan from (Belgium) Royal Antwerp)
—	MF	UKR	Nazar Verbnyi (loan return from Rukh Vynnyky)
—	MF	CRO	Frane Vojković (from (Croatia) Hajduk Split)
—	MF	UKR	Volodymyr Yakimets (from Shakhtar Donetsk)
—	FW	MDA	Alexandru Boiciuc (from (Denmark) Vejle)
—	FW	BRA	João Diogo (on loan from (Brazil) Figueirense)
—	FW	UKR	Ihor Karpenko (loan return from Volyn Lutsk)
—	FW	BLR	Kirill Kirilenko (from (Belarus) BATE Borisov)
—	FW	ISR	Hisham Layous (from (Israel) Bnei Sakhnin)
—	MF	UGA	Melvyn Lorenzen (from (Netherlands) ADO Den Haag)

Out:

No.	Pos.	Nation	Player
—	GK	UKR	Maksym Kuchynskyi (to (Georgia (country)) Dinamo Batumi)
—	GK	UKR	Herman Penkov (to Olimpik Donetsk)
—	DF	UKR	Artem Fedetskyi (paused career)
—	DF	SEN	Papa Gueye (to SC Dnipro-1)
—	DF	BIH	Adi Mehremić (to (Portugal) Aves)
—	DF	UKR	Denys Miroshnichenko (to Oleksandriya)
—	DF	UKR	Andriy Nesterov (to (Hungary) Mezőkövesd)
—	DF	CRO	Franjo Prce (to (Croatia) Varaždin)
—	DF	GEO	Nika Sandokhadze (to (Georgia (country)) Saburtalo Tbilisi)
—	DF	UKR	Nazar Stasyshyn (to Ahrobiznes Volochysk)
—	MF	CMR	Martin Hongla (loan return to (Spain) Granada)
—	MF	FRA	Karim Yoda (to (Spain) Racing Santander)
—	MF	UKR	Serhiy Myakushko (to (Spain) Alcorcón)
—	FW	BRA	William De Camargo (loan return to (Spain) CD Leganés B)
—	FW	UKR	Roman Debelko (to (Latvia) Riga)
—	FW	UKR	Ihor Karpenko (on loan to Volyn Lutsk)
—	FW	URU	Kevin Méndez
—	FW	UKR	Andriy Remenyuk (on loan to FC Kalush)

=== Kolos Kovalivka ===
In:

No.	Pos.	Nation	Player
—	DF	UKR	Illya Malyshkin (from Dynamo Kyiv)
—	DF	UKR	Vadym Paramonov (from FC Lviv)
—	MF	UKR	Yehor Demchenko (on loan from Avanhard Kramatorsk)
—	MF	UKR	Kamil Khuchbarov (from SC Dnipro-1)
—	MF	UKR	Pavlo Orikhovskyi (from Dynamo Kyiv)
—	MF	UKR	Oleh Osypenko (from Arsenal Kyiv)
—	MF	UKR	Yevhen Smyrnyi (on loan from Dynamo Kyiv)
—	MF	UKR	Oleksandr Volkov (on loan from Desna Chernihiv)
—	FW	UKR	Oleh Kozhushko (on loan from SC Dnipro-1)
—	FW	ISL	Árni Vilhjálmsson (from (Poland) Termalica Nieciecza)

Out:

No.	Pos.	Nation	Player
—	GK	UKR	Serhiy Sitalo
—	DF	UKR	Vladyslav Okhronchuk (on loan to Podillya Khmelnytskyi)
—	DF	UKR	Artem Terekhov (to Obolon-Brovar Kyiv)
—	MF	UKR	Denys Antyukh (on loan to Balkany Zorya)
—	MF	UKR	Maksym Banasevych (loan return to Desna Chernihiv)
—	MF	UKR	Yehor Demchenko (loan return to Avanhard Kramatorsk)
—	MF	UKR	Arsentiy Doroshenko (on loan to Podillya Khmelnytskyi)

=== Lviv ===
In:

No.	Pos.	Nation	Player
—	DF	UKR	Anton Bratkov (from (Israel) Maccabi Petah Tikva)
—	DF	BRA	Cleber
—	DF	UKR	Ihor Honchar (from Vorskla Poltava)
—	DF	UKR	Mykola Kvasnyi (from Prykarpattia Ivano-Frankivsk)
—	DF	UKR	Serhiy Lyulka (from Desna Chernihiv)
—	DF	UKR	Ruslan Zubkov (free agent)
—	MF	BRA	Araujo (loan return from (Slovakia) Lokomotíva Košice)
—	MF	BRA	Leonardo Montezello (from (Slovakia) Lokomotíva Košice)
—	FW	BRA	Baiano (from (Slovakia) Lokomotíva Košice)
—	FW	UKR	Yaroslav Bohunov (from (Belarus) NFK Minsk)
—	FW	BRA	Filipe Pachtmann
—	FW	BRA	Renan (from (Malta) San Ġwann)
—	FW	UKR	Mykyta Tatarkov (from (Belarus) Shakhtyor Soligorsk)

Out:

No.	Pos.	Nation	Player
—	DF	UKR	Oleksandr Nasonov
—	DF	UKR	Vadym Paramonov (to Kolos Kovalivka)
—	MF	BRA	Araujo (on loan to FC Mynai)
—	MF	BRA	Cadina (to (Greece) Ergotelis)
—	MF	UKR	Oleh Horin (to (Poland) Jagiellonia Białystok)
—	MF	BRA	Jonatan Lima
—	MF	UKR	Vitaliy Mykytyn (to Veres Rivne)
—	FW	BRA	Bruno Duarte (to (Portugal) Vitória Guimarães)
—	FW	UKR	Yuriy Ivanochko (to Veres Rivne)
—	FW	BRA	Kauê (loan return to (Brazil) Palmeiras)

=== Mariupol ===
In:

No.	Pos.	Nation	Player
—	DF	UKR	Serhiy Chobotenko (from Shakhtar Donetsk)
—	DF	UKR	Viktor Korniyenko (on loan from Shakhtar Donetsk)
—	DF	UKR	Vladyslav Savin (loan return from Avanhard Kramatorsk)
—	MF	UKR	Maksym Chekh (on loan from Shakhtar Donetsk)
—	MF	UKR	Oleksiy Kashchuk (on loan from Shakhtar Donetsk)
—	MF	UKR	Andriy Kulakov (on loan from Shakhtar Donetsk)
—	MF	UKR	Vyacheslav Tankovskyi (on loan from Shakhtar Donetsk)
—	MF	UKR	Dmytro Topalov (on loan from Shakhtar Donetsk)
—	FW	UKR	Vladyslav Vakula (on loan from Shakhtar Donetsk)

Out:

No.	Pos.	Nation	Player
—	GK	UKR	Yevhen Hrytsenko (loan return to Shakhtar Donetsk)
—	DF	UKR	Serhiy Chobotenko (loan return to Shakhtar Donetsk)
—	DF	ALB	Besir Demiri (to (Slovakia) Žilina)
—	DF	UKR	Vladyslav Savin (to Avanhard Kramatorsk)
—	MF	UKR	Yevheniy Bilokin (to Metalist 1925 Kharkiv)
—	MF	UKR	Danylo Ihnatenko (loan return to Shakhtar Donetsk)
—	MF	UKR	Ivan Holovkin (to Volyn Lutsk)
—	MF	UKR	Andriy Korobenko (loan return to Shakhtar Donetsk)
—	MF	UKR	Ivan Mochevynskyi (on loan to Polissya Zhytomyr)
—	MF	UKR	Artur Murza (to Volyn Lutsk)
—	MF	UKR	Oleksandr Pikhalyonok (loan return to Shakhtar Donetsk)
—	MF	UKR	Yevhen Prodanov (to Metalist 1925 Kharkiv)
—	MF	UKR	Oleksandr Zubkov (loan return to Shakhtar Donetsk)
—	FW	UKR	Vladyslav Buhay (loan return to Shakhtar Donetsk)
—	FW	UKR	Andriy Boryachuk (loan return to Shakhtar Donetsk)
—	FW	UKR	Danylo Sikan (loan return to Shakhtar Donetsk)
—	FW	UKR	Vladyslav Vakula (to Shakhtar Donetsk)

=== Oleksandriya ===
In:

No.	Pos.	Nation	Player
—	DF	LAT	Kaspars Dubra (from (Kazakhstan) Irtysh Pavlodar)
—	DF	UKR	Denys Miroshnichenko (from Karpaty Lviv)
—	MF	UKR	Valeriy Luchkevych (from (Belgium) Standard Liège)
—	MF	POR	João Teixeira (from (Romania) Politehnica Iași)
—	MF	UKR	Maksym Tretyakov (on loan from (Slovakia) Dunajská Streda)
—	FW	UKR	Denys Bezborodko (from Shakhtar Donetsk)

Out:

No.	Pos.	Nation	Player
—	GK	UKR	Vladyslav Levanidov (to Volyn Lutsk)
—	DF	UKR	Stanislav Mykytsey (to (Latvia) Jelgava)
—	DF	UKR	Dmytro Semenov (to MFC Mykolaiv)
—	DF	UKR	Vladyslav Shkinder (to FC Uzhhorod)
—	DF	UKR	Andriy Tsurikov (to (Czech Republic) Jablonec)
—	MF	UKR	Denys Dedechko (to (Armenia) Ararat Yerevan)
—	MF	UKR	Valeriy Luchkevych (loan return to (Belgium) Standard Liège)
—	MF	UKR	Artem Polyarus (to (Russia) Khimki)
—	MF	UKR	Serhiy Rusyan
—	FW	UKR	Vadym Hranchar (to Balkany Zorya)
—	FW	UKR	Vladyslav Kulach (loan return to Shakhtar Donetsk)
—	FW	UKR	Vitaliy Ponomar (to Volyn Lutsk)
—	FW	UKR	Orest Tkachuk
—	FW	UKR	Yevhen Verkholantsev

=== Olimpik Donetsk ===
In:

No.	Pos.	Nation	Player
—	GK	UKR	Herman Penkov (from Karpaty Lviv)
—	DF	NGR	Aliyu Abubakar (from (Belarus) FC Slutsk)
—	DF	UKR	Pavlo Lukyanchuk (from Dynamo Kyiv)
—	DF	UKR	Ivan Trubochkin (from Chornomorets Odesa)
—	DF	UKR	Ivan Zotko (from (Spain) Elche)
—	MF	BRA	Fabinho (from Metalist 1925 Kharkiv)
—	MF	MKD	Demir Imeri (from (Malta) Mosta)
—	MF	BRA	Luiz Fernando (from Metalist 1925 Kharkiv)
—	MF	AZE	Arziman Rizvanov (from (Czech Republic) Bohemians 1905)
—	MF	BFA	Dramane Salou (from (Serbia) Partizan)
—	FW	NGR	Geoffrey Chinedu (from (North Macedonia) Rabotnički)
—	FW	UKR	Taras Zaviyskyi (from (Germany) Buchonia Flieden)
—	FW	IRI	Shahab Zahedi (free agent)

Out:

No.	Pos.	Nation	Player
—	GK	UKR	Dani Junior Ltayf (to (Spain) CD Vitoria)
—	GK	UKR	Kostyantyn Makhnovskyi (loan return to Desna Chernihiv)
—	DF	NGR	Aliyu Abubakar
—	DF	NGR	Darlington Igwekali
—	DF	UKR	Illia Tymoshenko (to Polissya Zhytomyr)
—	MF	NGR	David Enogela
—	MF	UKR	Oleksiy Gai (retired)
—	MF	UKR	Vitaliy Koltsov (to Metalist 1925 Kharkiv)
—	MF	AZE	Arziman Rizvanov (on loan to Avanhard Kramatorsk)
—	MF	UKR	Ivan Sondey (to MFC Mykolaiv)
—	MF	UKR	Rinar Valeyev (to Obolon-Brovar Kyiv)
—	FW	UKR	Maksym Dehtyarov (on loan to Desna Chernihiv)

=== Shakhtar Donetsk ===
In:

No.	Pos.	Nation	Player
—	GK	UKR	Yevhen Hrytsenko (loan return from FC Mariupol)
—	DF	UKR	Serhiy Chobotenko (loan return from FC Mariupol)
—	DF	UKR	Oleh Danchenko (loan return from (Russia) Yenisey Krasnoyarsk)
—	DF	BRA	Dodô (loan return from (Portugal) Vitória Guimarães)
—	DF	UKR	Taras Kacharaba (loan return from (Czech Republic) Slovan Liberec)
—	DF	UKR	Danylo Sahutkin (loan return from Arsenal Kyiv)
—	DF	UKR	Yuriy Senytskyi (loan return from Avanhard Kramatorsk)
—	DF	UKR	Eduard Sobol (loan return from (Czech Republic) Jablonec)
—	DF	UKR	Serhiy Vakulenko (loan return from Arsenal Kyiv)
—	DF	BRA	Vitão (from (Brazil) Palmeiras)
—	MF	UKR	Danylo Ihnatenko (loan return from FC Mariupol)
—	MF	AZE	Murad Khachayev (loan return from (Azerbaijan) Sumgayit)
—	MF	UKR	Yevhen Konoplyanka (from (Germany) Schalke 04)
—	MF	UKR	Andriy Korobenko (loan return from FC Mariupol)
—	MF	UKR	Mykhailo Mudryk (loan return from Arsenal Kyiv)
—	MF	UKR	Ivan Petryak (loan return from (Hungary) Ferencváros)
—	MF	UKR	Oleksandr Pikhalyonok (loan return from FC Mariupol)
—	MF	UKR	Vyacheslav Tankovskyi (loan return from Arsenal Kyiv)
—	MF	UKR	Oleksandr Zubkov (loan return from FC Mariupol)
—	FW	UKR	Denys Arendaruk (loan return from Rukh Vynnyky)
—	FW	UKR	Denys Bezborodko (loan return from Desna Chernihiv)
—	FW	UKR	Andriy Boryachuk (loan return from FC Mariupol)
—	FW	ARG	Gustavo Blanco Leschuk (loan return from (Spain) Málaga)
—	FW	UKR	Vladyslav Buhay (loan return from FC Mariupol)
—	FW	UKR	Danylo Sikan (loan return from FC Mariupol)
—	FW	UKR	Vladyslav Vakula (from FC Mariupol)

Out:

No.	Pos.	Nation	Player
—	GK	UKR	Oleh Kudryk (on loan to Karpaty Lviv)
—	DF	UKR	Valeriy Bondarenko (on loan to (Portugal) Vitória Guimarães)
—	DF	UKR	Serhiy Chobotenko (to FC Mariupol)
—	DF	UKR	Oleh Danchenko (to (Russia) Rubin Kazan)
—	DF	UKR	Taras Kacharaba (to (Czech Republic) Slovan Liberec)
—	DF	UKR	Yukhym Konoplya (on loan to Desna Chernihiv)
—	DF	UKR	Viktor Korniyenko (on loan to FC Mariupol)
—	DF	UKR	Ivan Ordets (to (Russia) Dynamo Moscow)
—	DF	UKR	Danylo Sahutkin (on loan to (Russia) Yenisey Krasnoyarsk)
—	DF	UKR	Yuriy Senytskyi (to Avanhard Kramatorsk)
—	DF	UKR	Eduard Sobol (on loan to (Belgium) Brugge)
—	DF	UKR	Serhiy Vakulenko (to Karpaty Lviv)
—	MF	UKR	Maksym Chekh (on loan to FC Mariupol)
—	MF	UKR	Oleksandr Hlahola (to FC Mynai)
—	MF	UKR	Danylo Ihnatenko (on loan to (Hungary) Ferencváros)
—	MF	UKR	Oleksiy Kashchuk (on loan to FC Mariupol)
—	MF	UKR	Andriy Korobenko (to Rukh Lviv)
—	MF	UKR	Andriy Kulakov (on loan to FC Mariupol)
—	MF	UKR	Ivan Petryak (to (Hungary) MOL Vidi)
—	MF	UKR	Vyacheslav Tankovskyi (on loan to FC Mariupol)
—	MF	UKR	Dmytro Topalov (on loan to FC Mariupol)
—	MF	UKR	Oleksandr Zubkov (on loan to (Hungary) Ferencváros)
—	FW	UKR	Denys Bezborodko (to Oleksandriya)
—	FW	ARG	Gustavo Blanco Leschuk (to (Turkey) Antalyaspor)
—	FW	UKR	Vladyslav Buhay (to MFC Mykolaiv)
—	FW	BRA	Fernando (on loan to (Portugal) Sporting CP)
—	FW	NGR	Olarenwaju Kayode (on loan to (Turkey) Gazişehir Gaziantep)
—	FW	UKR	Vladyslav Kulach (on loan to (Hungary) Honvéd)
—	FW	BRA	Wellington Nem (on loan to (Brazil) Fluminense)
—	FW	UKR	Vladyslav Vakula (on loan to FC Mariupol)
—	FW	BLR	Ilya Vasilevich (to (Belarus) BATE Borisov)

=== Vorskla Poltava ===
In:

No.	Pos.	Nation	Player
—	GK	UKR	Danylo Kanevtsev (loan return from Metalist 1925 Kharkiv)
—	DF	UKR	Volodymyr Bayenko (from (Uzbekistan) Buxoro)
—	DF	ESP	Juanma García (from (England) Liverpool)
—	DF	UKR	Ihor Honchar (loan return from Hirnyk-Sport Horishni Plavni)
—	DF	UKR	Zurab Ochigava (from Dynamo Kyiv)
—	MF	BRA	Luizão (on loan from (Portugal) Porto B)
—	MF	TAN	Yohana Mkomola (on loan from (Tanzania) Young Africans)
—	MF	FRA	Pape-Alioune Ndiaye (from (Spain) Lorca Deportiva)
—	FW	ALB	Rubin Hebaj (from (Slovenia) Domžale)
—	FW	UKR	Volodymyr Odaryuk (loan return from Hirnyk-Sport Horishni Plavni)
—	FW	UKR	Andriy Stryzhak (from Arsenal Kyiv)

Out:

No.	Pos.	Nation	Player
—	GK	UKR	Bohdan Shust (to Inhulets Petrove)
—	DF	UKR	Oleksandr Chyzhov (retired)
—	DF	KOS	Ardin Dallku (to (North Macedonia) Shkëndija)
—	DF	GEO	Andro Giorgadze (to (Czech Republic) Fastav Zlín)
—	DF	UKR	Ihor Honchar (to FC Lviv)
—	MF	GEO	Aleksandre Kobakhidze (to Dnipro-1)
—	MF	UKR	Maryan Mysyk (to Rukh Lviv)
—	MF	UKR	Vyacheslav Sharpar (to (Latvia) Riga)
—	FW	BRA	Nicolas Careca (loan return to (Brazil) Grêmio)
—	FW	UKR	Volodymyr Odaryuk (to Hirnyk-Sport Horishni Plavni)
—	FW	UKR	Dmytro Shapoval
—	FW	UKR	Artem Tyshchenko (to Avanhard Kramatorsk)

=== Zorya Luhansk ===
In:

No.	Pos.	Nation	Player
—	GK	BIH	Nikola Vasilj (from (Germany) 1. FC Nürnberg)
—	DF	GER	Joel Abu Hanna (from (Germany) 1. FC Magdeburg)
—	DF	BRA	Lazio (from (Brazil) Itapemirim)
—	DF	UKR	Stanislav Nechyporenko (loan return from Avanhard Kramatorsk)
—	DF	UKR	Bohdan Mykhaylychenko (from Dynamo Kyiv)
—	DF	UKR	Mykhaylo Shershen (loan return from Avanhard Kramatorsk)
—	MF	UKR	Dmytro Ivanisenya (from (Georgia (country)) Dinamo Tbilisi)
—	MF	UKR	Vladlen Yurchenko (from (Denmark) Vejle Boldklub)
—	FW	UKR	Nazariy Rusyn (on loan from Dynamo Kyiv)

Out:

No.	Pos.	Nation	Player
—	GK	UKR	Oleh Chuvayev
—	DF	UKR	Vyacheslav Checher (retired)
—	DF	UKR	Stanislav Nechyporenko ((on loan?) to Kremin Kremenchuk)
—	DF	UKR	Bohdan Mykhaylychenko (loan return to Dynamo Kyiv)
—	DF	UKR	Mykhaylo Shershen ((on loan?) to Metalist 1925 Kharkiv)
—	DF	UKR	Yevhen Sukhina (to Metalurh Zaporizhya)
—	MF	UKR	Artem Hordiyenko (to (Moldova) Sheriff Tiraspol)
—	MF	UKR	Oleksandr Karavayev (to Dynamo Kyiv)
—	MF	BRA	Silas (on loan to (Israel) Hapoel Ironi Kiryat Shmona)
—	MF	UKR	Ihor Zahoruyko (on loan to Metalurh Zaporizhya)
—	FW	COL	Leonardo Acevedo (loan return to (Portugal) Sporting CP)

== Ukrainian First League ==
=== Ahrobiznes Volochysk ===
In:

No.	Pos.	Nation	Player
—	GK	UKR	Oleksandr Vorobey (from Volyn Lutsk)
—	DF	UKR	Serhiy Palyukh (from Dnipro)
—	DF	ESP	Pedro García ((on loan?) from (Spain) Real Betis Juv. A)
—	DF	UKR	Nazar Stasyshyn (from Karpaty Lviv)
—	MF	UKR	Mykola Buy (from Rukh Lviv)
—	MF	UKR	Bohdan Ivanchenko (from FC Sambir)
—	MF	ESP	Fran Monroy (free agent)
—	MF	UKR	Serhiy Semenyuk (from Arsenal Kyiv)
—	MF	UKR	Ihor Sikorskyi (from (Bangladesh) Sheikh Russel)
—	MF	UKR	Dmytro Verhun (from Dnipro)
—	MF	UKR	Oleksiy Zinkevych (from Volyn Lutsk)
—	MF	UKR	Roman Didyk (from UFK Karpaty Lviv)

Out:

No.	Pos.	Nation	Player
—	GK	UKR	Kostyantyn Odolskyi
—	DF	UKR	Nazar Shevchenko
—	DF	UKR	Yaroslav Yasnitskyi (to (Armenia) Lokomotiv Yerevan)
—	MF	UKR	Yevhen Chepurnenko (to (Georgia (country)) Shevardeni-1906 Tbilisi)
—	MF	UKR	Bohdan Ivanchenko (on loan to Bukovyna Chernivtsi)
—	MF	UKR	Oleh Nychyporenko
—	MF	UKR	Taras Plis
—	MF	UKR	Andriy Skakun (to Nyva Ternopil)
—	FW	UKR	Pavlo Fedosov

=== Avanhard Kramatorsk ===
In:

No.	Pos.	Nation	Player
—	GK	UKR	Mykyta Zelenskyi (from PFC Sumy)
—	DF	UKR	Illya Bryukhov (from (Italy) Torres)
—	DF	UKR	Oleh Boroday (from (Poland) Górnik Łęczna)
—	DF	UKR	Vladyslav Savin (from FC Mariupol)
—	DF	UKR	Yuriy Senytskyi (from Shakhtar Donetsk)
—	DF	UKR	Vladyslav Taranda (from Avanhard U-19)
—	MF	UKR	Andriy Dedyayev (from Enerhiya Nova Kakhovka)
—	MF	UKR	Yehor Demchenko (loan return from Kolos Kovalivka)
—	MF	UKR	Herman Khoruzhyi (from Avanhard U-19)
—	MF	UKR	Valeriy Kutsenko (from (Azerbaijan) Keşla)
—	MF	UKR	Maksym Bashynskyi (from Avanhard U-19)
—	MF	AZE	Arziman Rizvanov (on loan from Olimpik Donetsk)
—	FW	UKR	Ihor Kirienko (from Desna Chernihiv)
—	FW	UKR	Vadym Shavrin (from Polissya Zhytomyr)
—	FW	UKR	Artem Tyshchenko (from Vorskla Poltava)
—	FW	UKR	Vadym Yavorskyi (from SC Dnipro-1)

Out:

No.	Pos.	Nation	Player
—	GK	UKR	Mykyta Zelenskyi (to Balkany Zorya)
—	DF	UKR	Vladyslav Savin (loan return to FC Mariupol)
—	DF	UKR	Yuriy Senytskyi (loan return to Shakhtar Donetsk)
—	DF	UKR	Mykhaylo Shershen (loan return to Zorya Luhansk)
—	DF	UKR	Vitaliy Yermakov (loan return to Desna Chernihiv)
—	MF	UKR	Yehor Demchenko (on loan to Kolos Kovalivka)
—	MF	UKR	Dmytro Kopytov (loan return to Dynamo Kyiv)
—	MF	UKR	Stanislav Nechyporenko (loan return to Zorya Luhansk)
—	MF	UKR	Dmytro Skoblov (to Kremin Kremenchuk)
—	MF	UKR	Yevhen Troyanovskyi (on loan to Metalurh Zaporizhya)
—	MF	UKR	Oleh Yakovets
—	FW	UKR	Artem Khotsyanovskyi (loan return to Dynamo Kyiv)
—	FW	UKR	Ihor Kirienko (loan return to Desna Chernihiv)
—	FW	UKR	Bohdan Kushnarenko
—	FW	UKR	Oleksiy Schebetun (to Metalurh Zaporizhya)

=== Balkany Zorya ===
In:

No.	Pos.	Nation	Player
—	GK	UKR	Dmytro Demskyi (from Chornomorets Odesa)
—	GK	UKR	Mykyta Zelenskyi (from Avanhard Kramatorsk)
—	MF	UKR	Denys Antyukh (on loan from Kolos Kovalivka)
—	MF	UKR	Vadym Hranchar (from FC Oleksandriya)
—	MF	UKR	Viktor Serdenyuk (from Kremin Kremenchuk)
—	MF	UKR	Yaroslav Zakharevych (from Polissya Zhytomyr)

Out:

No.	Pos.	Nation	Player
—	GK	UKR	Serhiy Lukash (to Real Pharma Odesa)
—	DF	UKR	Serhiy Lyubchak (to Veres Rivne)
—	MF	UKR	Serhiy Herasymets (to Hirnyk-Sport Horishni Plavni)
—	MF	UKR	Kostyantyn Honcharenko
—	FW	UKR	Oleksandr Raichev (retired)
—	FW	UKR	Alisher Yakubov

=== Cherkashchyna Сherkasy ===
In:

No.	Pos.	Nation	Player
—	DF	UKR	Mykhaylo Tsebro (from Tavriya Simferopol)
—	MF	UKR	Ivan Antonyuk (from FC Kalush)
—	MF	UKR	Maksym Averyanov (from Kremin Kremenchuk)
—	MF	UKR	Yuriy Malyei (from Nyva Vinnytsia)
—	FW	UKR	Andriy Fayuk (from Metalist 1925 Kharkiv)

Out:

No.	Pos.	Nation	Player
—	DF	UKR	Oleh Tarasenko (to (Poland) Stomil Olsztyn)
—	MF	GEO	Levan Koshadze
—	MF	UKR	Vitaliy Tymofiyenko (to Veres Rivne)

=== Chornomorets Odesa ===
In:

No.	Pos.	Nation	Player
—	GK	UKR	Dmytro Bezotosnyi (from (Azerbaijan) Gabala)
—	DF	UKR	Denys Vasilyev (free agent)
—	DF	UKR	Serhiy Voronin (free agent)
—	MF	UKR	Andriy Tkachuk (from (Kazakhstan) Atyrau)
—	MF	UKR	Kostyantyn Yaroshenko (free agent)
—	FW	UKR	Bohdan Kovalenko (from (Latvia) Daugavpils)
—	FW	UKR	Oleksandr Kovpak (from Arsenal Kyiv)

Out:

No.	Pos.	Nation	Player
—	GK	UKR	Dmytro Bezotosnyi
—	GK	UKR	Serhiy Litovchenko (to (Georgia (country)) Dinamo Tbilisi)
—	DF	UKR	Oleksandr Kalitov (to Nyva Vinnytsia)
—	DF	UKR	Andriy Mischenko (to (Russia) SKA-Khabarovsk)
—	DF	UKR	Ivan Trubochkin (to Olimpik Donetsk)
—	DF	UKR	Denys Vasilyev
—	MF	UKR	Artem Yarmolenko
—	MF	UKR	Ruslan Babenko (to (Poland) Raków Częstochowa)
—	MF	UKR	Artem Chorniy
—	MF	UKR	Kostiantyn Domaratskyi (to SC Dnipro-1)
—	MF	UKR	Yevhen Morozenko (to Veres Rivne)
—	FW	UKR	Volodymyr Koval
—	FW	RUS	Vasili Pavlov
—	FW	ISL	Árni Vilhjálmsson (loan return (Poland) Termalica Nieciecza)

=== Hirnyk-Sport Horishni Plavni ===
In:

No.	Pos.	Nation	Player
—	GK	UKR	Anton Sytnykov (from Inhulets Petrove)
—	DF	UKR	Ivan Bilyi (from (Armenia) Lokomotiv Yerevan)
—	DF	UKR	Bohdan Bychkov (from Kremin Kremenchuk)
—	DF	UKR	Andriy Derkach (free agent)
—	DF	UKR	Oleksandr Holovko (free agent)
—	DF	UKR	Serhiy Sukhanov (from Polissya Zhytomyr)
—	MF	UKR	Oleksandr Chepelyuk (on loan from Rukh Lviv)
—	MF	UKR	Serhiy Herasymets (from Balkany Zorya)
—	MF	UKR	Artem Kozlov (on loan from Inhulets Petrove)
—	MF	UKR	Andriy Ralyuchenko (from Metalist 1925 Kharkiv)
—	MF	UKR	Oleksiy Zbun (from (Belarus) Torpedo Minsk)
—	FW	UKR	Viktor Khomchenko (free agent)
—	FW	UKR	Artem Khotsyanovskyi ((on loan?) from Dynamo Kyiv)
—	FW	UKR	Volodymyr Odaryuk (from Vorskla Poltava)

Out:

No.	Pos.	Nation	Player
—	GK	UKR	Roman Chopko (to Bukovyna Chernivtsi)
—	GK	UKR	Andriy Ryazantsev
—	DF	UKR	Ihor Honchar (loan return to Vorskla Poltava)
—	DF	UKR	Oleksiy Pinchuk
—	DF	UKR	Dmytro Zozulya (to Kremin Kremenchuk)
—	MF	UKR	Artem Baftalovskyi (to Enerhiya Nova Kakhovka)
—	MF	UKR	Rostyslav Dychko
—	MF	UKR	Roman Myronenko
—	MF	UKR	Serhiy Zuyevych (to Podillya Khmelnytskyi)
—	FW	UKR	Anton Kicha (to FC Mynai)
—	FW	UKR	Volodymyr Odaryuk (loan return to Vorskla Poltava)

=== Inhulets Petrove ===
In:

No.	Pos.	Nation	Player
—	GK	UKR	Roman Lyopka (from Nyva Vinnytsia)
—	GK	UKR	Bohdan Shust (from Vorskla Poltava)
—	DF	UKR	Dmytro Fatyeyev (from FC Lviv)
—	MF	UKR	Vladyslav Ihnatyev (from Krystal Kherson)
—	MF	UKR	Volodymyr Korobka (free agent)
—	MF	UKR	Artem Kozlov (loan return from Kremin Kremenchuk)
—	MF	UKR	Oleh Marchuk (free agent)

Out:

No.	Pos.	Nation	Player
—	GK	UKR	Roman Herych
—	GK	UKR	Anton Sytnykov (to Hirnyk-Sport Horishni Plavni)
—	DF	UKR	Ihor Kotsyumaka (on loan to Hirnyk Kryvyi Rih)
—	DF	UKR	Bohdan Mytsyk
—	DF	UKR	Ihor Soldat (to Veres Rivne)
—	MF	UKR	Artem Kozlov (on loan to Hirnyk-Sport Horishni Plavni)
—	MF	UKR	Stanislav Peredystyi (on loan to VPK-Ahro Shevchenkivka)
—	MF	UKR	Vyacheslav Pidnebennyi (to Alians Lypova Dolyna)

=== Kremin Kremenchuk ===
In:

No.	Pos.	Nation	Player
—	GK	UKR	Orest Budyuk (from Arsenal Kyiv)
—	DF	UKR	Roman Honcharenko (from Polissya Zhytomyr)
—	DF	UKR	Oleksandr Horodenko (from Chornomorets Odesa)
—	DF	UKR	Stanislav Nechyporenko ((on loan?) from Zorya Luhansk)
—	DF	UKR	Dmytro Zozulya (from Hirnyk-Sport Horishni Plavni)
—	MF	UKR	Ihor Koshman (from Metalist 1925 Kharkiv)
—	MF	UKR	Artem Nedolya (from Polissya Zhytomyr)
—	MF	UKR	Yuriy Pavlyk (from (Poland) Radunia Stężyca)
—	MF	UKR	Dmytro Skoblov (from Avanhard Kramatorsk)
—	MF	UKR	Vadym Voronchenko (from Metalurh Zaporizhya)
—	MF	UKR	Oleksandr Yermachenko (from (Georgia (country)) Shevardeni-1906 Tbilisi)
—	FW	UKR	Dmytro Kozban (from Volyn Lutsk)
—	FW	UKR	Ivan Kuts (loan return from FC Nikopol)
—	FW	UKR	Rostyslav Taranukha (from Polissya Zhytomyr)
—	FW	UKR	Mykhaylo Udod (free agent)

Out:

No.	Pos.	Nation	Player
—	GK	UKR	Yaroslav Kotlyarov (to Volyn Lutsk)
—	DF	UKR	Ernest Astakhov
—	DF	UKR	Bohdan Bychkov (to Hirnyk-Sport Horishni Plavni)
—	DF	UKR	Dmytro Entin
—	DF	UKR	Nazar Malinovskyi (to Kremin-Yunior Kremenchuk)
—	DF	UKR	Stanislav Nechyporenko (free agent / loan return to Zorya Luhansk ??)
—	DF	UKR	Serhiy Vovkodav (retired)
—	DF	UKR	Dmytro Zaderetskyi (to Polissya Zhytomyr)
—	MF	UKR	Maksym Averyanov (to Cherkashchyna Сherkasy)
—	MF	UKR	Yuriy Hluschuk (to (Armenia) Lokomotiv Yerevan)
—	MF	UKR	Artem Kozlov (loan return to Inhulets Petrove)
—	MF	UKR	Vladyslav Piskun
—	MF	UKR	Oleksandr Safonov
—	MF	UKR	Viktor Serdenyuk (to Balkany Zorya)
—	MF	UKR	Serhiy Stepanchuk
—	FW	UKR	Kostyantyn Cherniy (to (Latvia) Valmieras FK)
—	FW	UKR	Roman Loktionov (to Kremin-Yunior Kremenchuk)

=== Metalist 1925 Kharkiv ===
In:

No.	Pos.	Nation	Player
—	GK	UKR	Vladyslav Fedak (free agent)
—	DF	NGR	Chidera Anih Kelit (from (Nigeria) Abuja Football College)
—	DF	UKR	Oleksandr Osman ((on loan?) from Dynamo Kyiv)
—	DF	UKR	Mykhaylo Shershen ((on loan?) from Zorya Luhansk)
—	MF	UKR	Yevheniy Bilokin (from FC Mariupol)
—	MF	UKR	Oleksandr Demchenko (from Nyva Vinnytsia)
—	MF	BRA	Derek
—	MF	UKR	Vladyslav Dmytrenko (from (Germany) Viktoria Köln)
—	MF	BRA	Dodô
—	MF	UKR	Vitaliy Koltsov (from Olimpik Donetsk)
—	MF	UKR	Vladyslav Krayev (loan return from (Moldova) Dinamo-Auto Tiraspol)
—	MF	BRA	Lucas
—	MF	UKR	Yevhen Prodanov (from FC Mariupol)
—	MF	UKR	Anton Savin (from Polissya Zhytomyr)
—	FW	UKR	Serhiy Petrov (from Rukh Lviv)
—	FW	UKR	Maksym Pryadun (free agent)

Out:

No.	Pos.	Nation	Player
—	GK	UKR	Danylo Kanevtsev (loan return to Vorskla Poltava)
—	DF	UKR	Nazar Melnychuk (to Volyn Lutsk)
—	DF	UKR	Dmytro Sydorenko (to Enerhiya Nova Kakhovka)
—	MF	UKR	Yehor Chehurko
—	MF	UKR	Oleksandr Demchenko (to Nyva Vinnytsia)
—	MF	BRA	Fabinho (to Olimpik Donetsk)
—	MF	BRA	Luiz Fernando (to Olimpik Donetsk)
—	MF	UKR	Dmytro Hrankin (to Viktoriya Mykolaivka)
—	MF	UKR	Ivan Kaliuzhnyi (loan return to Dynamo Kyiv)
—	MF	GEO	Luka Koberidze (to (Georgia (country)) Torpedo Kutaisi)
—	MF	UKR	Ihor Koshman (to Kremin Kremenchuk)
—	MF	UKR	Yehor Kovalenko
—	MF	UKR	Andriy Ralyuchenko (to Hirnyk-Sport Horishni Plavni)
—	FW	UKR	Andriy Fayuk (to Cherkashchyna Cherkasy Oblast)
—	FW	UKR	Oleh Synytsia (to Rukh Lviv)

=== Metalurh Zaporizhya ===
In:

No.	Pos.	Nation	Player
—	DF	UKR	Serhiy Kulynych (free agent)
—	DF	UKR	Pavlo Myahkov (from (Poland) Ruch Chorzów)
—	DF	UKR	Valentyn Rudych (from Bukovyna Chernivtsi)
—	DF	UKR	Yevhen Sukhina (from Zorya Luhansk)
—	MF	UKR	Denys Byelousov (from Myr Hornostayivka)
—	MF	UKR	Vadym Hryppa (from Tavriya Simferopol)
—	MF	UKR	Serhiy Rudyka (free agent)
—	MF	UKR	Yevhen Troyanovskyi (on loan from Avanhard Kramatorsk)
—	MF	UKR	Ihor Zahoruyko (on loan to Zorya Luhansk)
—	FW	UKR	Oleksiy Schebetun (from Avanhard Kramatorsk)

Out:

No.	Pos.	Nation	Player
—	GK	UKR	Ihor Vartsaba
—	DF	UKR	Vladyslav Bobrov
—	DF	UKR	Denys Danyuk (to (Autonomous Republic of Crimea) Krymteplytsia Molodizhne)
—	DF	UKR	Oleksandr Kapliyenko (to (Georgia (country)) Dinamo Tbilisi)
—	DF	UKR	Pylyp Khamakha
—	DF	UKR	Yevhen Korokhov (to Polissya Zhytomyr)
—	DF	UKR	Artur Kuznetsov
—	DF	UKR	Oleksandr Matveyev
—	DF	UKR	Vitaliy Polyanskyi (to Bukovyna Chernivtsi)
—	DF	UKR	Andriy Synytskyi
—	MF	UKR	Andriy Havrylenko
—	MF	UKR	Oleksiy Hodin
—	MF	UKR	Vadym Hryppa (to Tavriya Simferopol)
—	MF	UKR	Yevhen Pidlepenets (to (Spain) Deportivo Fabril)
—	MF	UKR	Yevhen Pisotskyi
—	MF	UKR	Roman Stefurak
—	MF	UKR	Vadym Voronchenko (to Kremin Kremenchuk)
—	MF	UKR	Oleksandr Zeynalov (to (Autonomous Republic of Crimea) Krymteplytsia Molodizhne)
—	FW	UKR	Illya Kornyev
—	FW	UKR	Oleksandr Yarovenko (to (Montenegro) Kom Podgorica)

=== MFC Mykolaiv ===
In:

No.	Pos.	Nation	Player
—	DF	UKR	Dmytro Semenov (from FC Oleksandriya)
—	DF	UKR	Volodymyr Kirychuk (from FC Dnipro)
—	DF	UKR	Andriy Slinkin (from Desna Chernihiv)
—	DF	UKR	Andriy Zaporoshchenko (from Shakhtar Donetsk)
—	MF	UKR	Serhiy Panasenko (from SC Dnipro-1)
—	MF	UKR	Vladyslav Roslyakov (from Enerhiya Nova Kakhovka)
—	MF	UKR	Ivan Sondey (from Olimpik Donetsk)
—	FW	UKR	Vladyslav Buhay (from FC Mariupol)

Out:

No.	Pos.	Nation	Player
—	GK	ARM	Valeriy Voskonyan (to (Finland) Vaasan Palloseura)
—	DF	UKR	Dmytro Nazarenko (retired)
—	DF	UKR	Yuriy Tsapiy
—	DF	UKR	Andriy Zaporoshchenko
—	FW	UKR	Artem Radchenko

=== FC Mynai ===
In:

No.	Pos.	Nation	Player
—	GK	UKR	Andriy Cherepko (from (Hungary) Kisvárda)
—	DF	UKR	Orkhan Ibadov (from Arsenal Kyiv)
—	DF	UKR	Oleksandr Matkobozhyk (from Volyn Lutsk)
—	DF	BRA	Antonio Santos (from (Slovakia) Lokomotíva Košice)
—	DF	UKR	Maksym Zhychykov (from Arsenal Kyiv)
—	MF	BRA	Araujo (on loan from FC Lviv)
—	MF	UKR	Oleksandr Hlahola (from Shakhtar Donetsk)
—	MF	UKR	Anton Kicha (from Hirnyk-Sport Horishni Plavni)
—	FW	UKR	Oleh Mayik (from Veres Rivne)

Out:

No.	Pos.	Nation	Player
—	DF	UKR	Stefan Fedak (to FC Uzhhorod)
—	DF	UKR	Volodymyr Kornutyak
—	DF	UKR	Ihor Oshchypko
—	DF	UKR	Yuriy Putrash
—	DF	UKR	Robert Smokorovskyi

=== Obolon-Brovar Kyiv ===
In:

No.	Pos.	Nation	Player
—	GK	UKR	Yevhen Borovyk (free agent)
—	DF	UKR	Oleksiy Maydanevych (from (Georgia (country)) Shevardeni-1906 Tbilisi)
—	DF	UKR	Artem Terekhov (from Kolos Kovalivka)
—	MF	UKR	Yuriy Brovchenko (from SC Dnipro-1)
—	MF	BRA	Guttiner Tenorio (from (Czech Republic) Viktoria Žižkov)
—	MF	UKR	Taras Puchkovskyi (free agent)
—	MF	UKR	Oleksiy Savchenko (from Polissya Zhytomyr)
—	MF	UKR	Rinar Valeyev (from Olimpik Donetsk)
—	FW	UKR	Oleksandr Batalskyi (from (Georgia (country)) Shevardeni-1906 Tbilisi)

Out:

No.	Pos.	Nation	Player
—	MF	BRA	Guttiner Tenorio (to (Czech Republic) Viktoria Žižkov)
—	MF	UKR	Serhiy Kosovskyi (to (Slovakia) Slávia TU Košice)
—	MF	UKR	Vasyl Prodan
—	MF	UKR	Mykhaylo Shyshka (to (Georgia (country)) Dinamo Tbilisi)
—	FW	CAN	Aramis Kouzine (to SC Dnipro-1)

=== Prykarpattia Ivano-Frankivsk ===
In:

No.	Pos.	Nation	Player
—	DF	UKR	Ivan Pastukh (from Naftovyk Dolyna)
—	DF	UKR	Volodymyr Radulskyi (from Naftovyk Dolyna)
—	MF	UKR	Yuriy Shpyrka (on loan from Dynamo Kyiv)
—	MF	UKR	Oleksandr Soldatenko (from Prykarpattia-Teplovyk)
—	FW	UKR	Andriy Khoma (from Prykarpattia-Teplovyk)
—	FW	UKR	Vladyslav Semotyuk (from Arsenal Kyiv)

Out:

No.	Pos.	Nation	Player
—	GK	UKR	Vasyl Stefyuk
—	DF	UKR	Mykola Kvasnyi (to FC Lviv)
—	MF	UKR	Svyatoslav Lavruk (to FC Kalush)
—	MF	UKR	Oleh Vepryk (retired)

=== Rukh Lviv ===
In:

No.	Pos.	Nation	Player
—	DF	UKR	Dmytro Nyemchaninov (from Desna Chernihiv)
—	MF	UKR	Ivan Kaliuzhnyi (on loan from Dynamo Kyiv)
—	MF	UKR	Maksym Banasevych (from Desna Chernihiv)
—	MF	UKR	Andriy Korobenko (from Shakhtar Donetsk)
—	MF	UKR	Yaroslav Martynyuk (from (Cyprus) Ermis Aradippou)
—	MF	UKR	Maryan Mysyk (from Vorskla Poltava)
—	MF	UKR	Oleh Synytsya (from Metalist 1925 Kharkiv)
—	MF	GHA	Ernest Antwi (from (Portugal) Leiria)

Out:

No.	Pos.	Nation	Player
—	DF	UKR	Mykyta Khodorchenko
—	DF	UKR	Ivan Lobay (to (Estonia) Nõmme Kalju)
—	MF	UKR	Mykola Buy (to Ahrobiznes Volochysk)
—	MF	UKR	Oleksandr Chepelyuk (on loan to Hirnyk-Sport Horishni Plavni)
—	MF	BRA	Gabriel (on loan to FC Kalush)
—	MF	UKR	Maksym Hrysyo (loan return to Karpaty Lviv)
—	MF	UKR	Andriy Lyashenko (on loan)
—	MF	UKR	Maryan Mysyk (on loan to Veres Rivne)
—	MF	UKR	Nazar Verbnyi (loan return to Karpaty Lviv)
—	FW	UKR	Svyatoslav Kozlovskyi
—	FW	UKR	Serhiy Petrov (to Metalist 1925 Kharkiv)

=== Volyn Lutsk ===
In:

No.	Pos.	Nation	Player
—	GK	UKR	Yaroslav Kotlyarov (from Kremin Kremenchuk)
—	GK	UKR	Vladyslav Levanidov (from FC Oleksandriya)
—	DF	UKR	Nazar Melnychuk (from Metalist 1925 Kharkiv)
—	DF	UKR	Taras Mykhalyk (from (Russia) Lokomotiv Moscow)
—	MF	UKR	Ambrosiy Chachua (from (Georgia (country)) Torpedo Kutaisi)
—	MF	UKR	Ivan Holovkin (from FC Mariupol)
—	MF	UKR	Artur Murza (from FC Mariupol)
—	MF	UKR	Andriy Stryzheus (from (Belarus) Slonim-2017)
—	FW	UKR	Vitaliy Ponomar (from FC Oleksandriya)

Out:

No.	Pos.	Nation	Player
—	GK	UKR	Bohdan Kohut
—	GK	UKR	Oleksandr Vorobey (to Ahrobiznes Volochysk)
—	DF	UKR	Oleksandr Matkobozhyk (to FC Mynai)
—	DF	UKR	Serhiy Petko (to Veres Rivne)
—	DF	UKR	Artur Zapadnya (to Desna Chernihiv)
—	MF	UKR	Oleh Herasymyuk
—	MF	UKR	Oleh Marchuk (to Inhulets Petrove)
—	MF	UKR	Oleksiy Zinkevych (to Ahrobiznes Volochysk)
—	FW	UKR	Ihor Karpenko (loan return to Karpaty Lviv)
—	FW	UKR	Dmytro Kozban (to Kremin Kremenchuk)

== See also ==
- Winter 2018–19 transfers
