= 2020–21 Ukrainian Cup =

Tournament details
- Country: Ukraine
- Dates: 26 August 2020–13 May 2021; 26 August 2020–17 September 2020 (preliminary rounds); 30 September 2020–13 May 2021 (main event)
- Teams: 55

Final positions
- Champions: Dynamo Kyiv (13th title)
- Runners-up: Zorya Luhansk
- Semifinalists: FC Oleksandriya; Ahrobiznes Volochysk
- UEFA Europa League: none (Note: The winner Dynamo Kyiv qualified for the UEFA Champions League)

Tournament statistics
- Matches played: 52
- Goals scored: 143 (2.75 per match)
- Attendance: 27,857 (536 per match)
- Top goal scorer(s): Mykola Buy (Epitsentr), Robert Hehedosh (Veres), Artem Dovbyk (Dnipro-1); 4 goals
- All statistics correct as of 13 May 2021. Due to COVID-19 situation, many matches (31) were played without any spectators

The 2020–21 Ukrainian Cup was the 30th annual season of Ukraine's football knockout competition. The competition started on 26 August 2020 and concluded on 13 May 2021 with the final at the Ternopilsky Misky Stadion in Ternopil.

All competition rounds consisted of a single game with a home field advantage granted to a team from lower league. Draw for all the rounds was blind. Qualification for the competition was granted to all professional clubs and finalists of the 2019–20 Ukrainian Amateur Cup.

This season was the first, when two teams started the competition from the quarter-final stage: the defending winners (Dynamo Kyiv) and the champions of Ukraine of the previous season (Shakhtar Donetsk).

Dynamo Kyiv won their joint-record 13th Ukrainian Cup title after beating Zorya Luhansk 1–0 in extra time in the final. They therefore qualified to the play-off round of the 2020–21 UEFA Europa League, however they qualified for the Champions League through league season.

Due to the ongoing COVID-19 pandemic, access of spectators to stadium was limited, but was allowed to one of postponed games (matches) of the first preliminary round on 9 September 2020 at Slavutych Arena.

== Team allocation and schedule ==
The competition includes all professional first teams from the Premier League (14/14 teams of the league), First League (16/16), Second League (23/27) and two best teams from the previous year's Amateur Cup. Three second club teams from the Second League are not eligible for the tournament, FC Kalush did not participate.

Distribution
	Teams entering in this round	Teams advancing from previous round
First preliminary round (38 teams)	13 entrants from the First League; 23 entrants from the Second League; Winner and finalist of the 2019–20 Amateur Cup	
Second preliminary round (22 teams)	3 entrants from the First League	19 winners from the First preliminary round
Round of 32 (22 teams)	11 entrants from the Premier League	11 winners from the Second preliminary round
Round of 16 (12 teams)	1 entrant from the Premier League	11 winners from the Third preliminary round
Quarter-finals (8 teams)	Winners of the 2019–20 Cup; Champions of the 2019–20 Premier League	6 winners from the Round of 16

=== Rounds schedule ===
Phase	Round	Fractional	Draw date	Game date
Preliminary	First round	1/64 finals	21 August 2020	26–30 August 2020
Preliminary	Second round	1/32 finals	10 September 2020	16–17 September 2020
Main event	Round of 32	1/16 finals	18 September 2020	30 September 2020
Main event	Round of 16	1/8 finals	27 October 2020	2 December 2020
Main event	Quarter-finals	1/4 finals	18 December 2020	3 March 2021
Main event	Semi-finals	1/2 finals	4 March 2021	1–2 April 2021
Main event	Final at Ternopilsky Misky Stadion		4 March 2021	13 May 2021

=== Teams ===
Enter in First Round			Enter in Second Round	Enter in Round of 32	Enter in Round of 16
AAFU; 2/2 teams	PFL League 2; 23/27 teams	PFL League 1; 13/16 teams	PFL League1; 3/16 teams	UPL; 11/14 teams	UPL; 1/14 teams
Olympia Savyntsi; Viktoriya Mykolaivka	Balkany Zorya; Bukovyna Chernivtsi; Chaika Petropavlivska Borshchahivka; Cherkashchyna Cherkasy; FC Chernihiv*; Dinaz Vyshhorod; Dnipro Cherkasy*; Enerhiya Nova Kakhovka; Epitsentr Dunaivtsi*; Karpaty Halych*; Karpaty Lviv; Kryvbas Kryvyi Rih; Metal Kharkiv; Metalurh Zaporizhia; FC Nikopol; Nyva Vinnytsia; Peremoha Dnipro*; Podillya Khmelnytskyi; Real Pharma Odesa; Rubikon Kyiv*; Tavriya Simferopol; FC Uzhhorod; Yarud Mariupol*	Alians Lypova Dolyna; Chornomorets Odesa; Hirnyk-Sport; Avanhard Kramatorsk; Kremin Kremenchuk; Krystal Kherson; Metalist 1925 Kharkiv; MFC Mykolaiv; Nyva Ternopil; Polissya Zhytomyr; Prykarpattia Ivano-Frankivsk; Veres Rivne; VPK-Ahro Shevchenkivka	Ahrobiznes Volochysk; Obolon Kyiv; Volyn Lutsk	Desna Chernihiv; SC Dnipro-1; Inhulets Petrove; Kolos Kovalivka; FC Lviv; FC Mariupol; FC Mynai; FC Oleksandriya; Olimpik Donetsk; Rukh Lviv; Vorskla Poltava	Zorya Luhansk

Notes:

- FC Dynamo Kyiv and FC Shakhtar Donetsk entered competitions at quarterfinals.
- With the asterisk (*) are noted the Second League teams that were recently admitted to the league from amateurs and the AAFU (amateur) team(s) that qualified in place of the Amateur Cup finalist(s).
- Four of the Second League teams were not drawn for the competition: FC Kalush (withdrew before the draw), Volyn-2, Mykolaiv-2, Obolon-2.

== Bracket ==
The following is the tournament bracket that the main stage of the Ukrainian Cup resembles. Numbers in parentheses next to the match score represent the results of a penalty shoot-out.

Third round 30 September - 13 November
30 September 2020
Epitsentr Dunaivtsi	1
Ahrobiznes Volochysk	2
30 September 2020
Vorskla Poltava	2
FC Lviv	0
30 September 2020
Prykarpattia Ivano-Frankivsk	0
Kolos Kovalivka	1
30 September 2020
Kryvbas Kryvyi Rih	0
Nyva Vinnytsia	1
30 September 2020
Hirnyk-Sport Horishni Plavni	3
SC Dnipro-1 (a.e.t.)	5
13 November 2020
VPK-Ahro Shevchenkivka	1
Olimpik Donetsk	0
30 September 2020
Polissya Zhytomyr	1
FC Mynai	2
30 September 2020
FC Oleksandriya	4
Inhulets Petrove	1
30 September 2020
Veres Rivne (a.e.t.)	4
MFC Mykolaiv	2
30 September 2020
Viktoriya Mykolaivka	1
FC Mariupol	3
30 September 2020
Desna Chernihiv	2
Rukh Lviv	1

Round of 16; 2–16 December 2020
2 December 2020
Ahrobiznes Volochysk	1
Vorskla Poltava	0
2 December 2020
Nyva Vinnytsia	0
Kolos Kovalivka	4
2 December 2020
VPK-Ahro Shevchenkivka	0
SC Dnipro-1	5
2 December 2020
FC Oleksandriya	3
FC Mynai	0
2 December 2020
Veres Rivne	1
FC Mariupol	0
16 December 2020
Desna Chernihiv	0
Zorya Luhansk	1

Quarter-finals; 3 March 2021
3 March
Ahrobiznes Volochysk (a.e.t.)	1
Shakhtar Donetsk	0
3 March
Dynamo Kyiv (p)	0 (4)
Kolos Kovalivka	0 (3)
3 March
SC Dnipro-1	1 (3)
FC Oleksandriya (p)	1 (4)
3 March
Veres Rivne	1
Zorya Luhansk	2

Semi-finals; 21 April 2021
21 April
Ahrobiznes Volochysk	0
Dynamo Kyiv	3
21 April
FC Oleksandriya	1 (3)
Zorya Luhansk (p)	1 (4)

Final; 13 May 2021
13 May
Dynamo Kyiv (a.e.t.)	1
Zorya Luhansk	0

== Competition schedule ==
Legends: AM – AAFU (amateur) competitions (IV tier), 2L – Second League (III tier), 1L – First League (II tier), PL – Premier League (I tier)

=== First preliminary round (1/64) ===
In this round, 13 clubs from the First League, 23 clubs from the Second League and both finalists of the 2019–20 Ukrainian Amateur Cup entered the competition.

The draw was held on 21 August 2020.

26 August 2020	Kryvbas Kryvyi Rih (2L)	4–2	(2L) Cherkashchyna Cherkasy	Kryvyi Rih, Dnipropetrovsk Oblast
	Berko 13'; Pyatov 24', 71'; Kotsyumaka 54'	Report	Heorhiev 62'; Tyshchenko 85'	Stadium: Hirnyk Stadium; Referee: I. Bych (Kyiv)

28 August 2020	Chaika Petropavlivska Borshchahivka (2L)	0–1	(1L) Polissya Zhytomyr	Makariv, Kyiv Oblast
		Report	Daudov 69'	Stadium: M.K Brukvenko Central Stadium; Referee: I.Stashuk (Chernihiv)

28 August 2020	Karpaty Halych (2L)	1–2	(1L) Nyva Ternopil	Burshtyn, Ivano-Frankivsk Oblast
	Poruchynskyi 59'	Report	Khokhlov 39'; Demchuk 67'	Stadium: Enerhetyk Stadium; Referee: O.Kalionov (Lviv)

29 August 2020	Peremoha Dnipro (2L)	0–2	(1L) Kremin Kremenchuk	Dnipro
		Report	Luiz Fernando 55' (pen.); Kulish 81'	Stadium: Olimpiyski Rezervy; Referee: D.Kuzovliev (Zaporizhya)

29 August 2020	Metal Kharkiv (2L)	1–3	(1L) VPK-Ahro Shevchenkivka	Kharkiv
	Demchenko 18'; Demchenko (penalty missed) 69'	Report	Lyashenko 31'; Kicha 37'; Lohinov 56'	Stadium: Nova Bavariya Stadion; Referee: S.Zadyran (Kyiv Oblast)

29 August 2020	Viktoriya Mykolaivka (AM)	4–0	(2L) Yarud Mariupol	Mykolaivka, Sumy Oblast
	Beziazychnyi 5'; Akimov 34' (pen.), 66'; Kuzmin 35'	Report		Stadium: Viktoriya Stadium; Referee: Ye.Nazarov (Kharkiv)

29 August 2020	Alians Lypova Dolyna (1L)	2–0	(1L) Metalist 1925 Kharkiv	Sumy
	Zahynailov 45+1', 70'	Report		Stadium: Yuvileiny Stadium; Referee: D.Reznikov (Kamianske)

29 August 2020	FC Nikopol (2L)	1–3	(1L) Krystal Kherson	Nikopol, Dnipropetrovsk Oblast
	Omelchenko 74'	Report	Semenyna 2' (pen.); Malysh 18'; Hlyvyi 81'	Stadium: Elektrometalurh Stadium; Referee: Ye.Kievlich (Kropyvnytskyi)

29 August 2020	Enerhiya Nova Kakhovka (2L)	2–3	(1L) Chornomorets Odesa	Nova Kakhovka, Kherson Oblast
	Havrylenko 31'; Rossokhatyi 81'	Report	Sikorskyi 15'; Avahimyan 35', 45+1'	Stadium: Enerhiya Stadium; Referee: P.Dubrovets (Zhytomyr)

29 August 2020	Balkany Zorya (2L)	0–1	(1L) MFC Mykolaiv	Zoria, Odesa Oblast
		Report	Odariuk 33'	Stadium: Borys Tropanets Stadium; Referee: O.Sakhno (Kyiv Oblast)

29 August 2020	Rubikon Kyiv (2L)	0–2	(2L) Dinaz Vyshhorod	Shchaslyve, Kyiv Oblast
		Report	Bryzhchuk 16'; Dmytrenko 74'	Stadium: Kniazha Arena/Arsenal Arena; Referee: Ye.Tsybulko (Chernihiv Oblast)

29 August 2020	Nyva Vinnytsia (2L)	+ / – (Note: Awarded a technical result (without any score). FC Chernihiv failed to arrived due to a breakdown of the team's bus)	(2L) FC Chernihiv	Vinnytsia
		[ Report]		Referee: A.Mykhailiuk (Kyiv)

29 August 2020	Podillya Khmelnytskyi (2L)	– / + (Note: Awarded a technical result (without any score). The game ended in 1 – 1 tie and (8–7 p) advantage Podillia, but Podillia fielded a disqualified footballer Yan Morhovskyi against Prykarpattia.)	(1L) Prykarpattia Ivano-Frankivsk	Khmelnytskyi
	Zhdanov 72' (pen.); Shpikula 86' (o.g.)	Report		Stadium: Stadion Podillya; Referee: V.Podryhulia (Lutsk)

29 August 2020	FC Uzhhorod (2L)	2–0	(2L) Bukovyna Chernivtsi	Uzhhorod
	Chonka 64'	Report	Mosiuk 25' (o.g.); Syvka (penalty missed) 57'	Stadium: Stadion Avanhard; Referee: A.Romaniuk (Ivano-Frankivsk)

30 August 2020	Tavriya Simferopol (2L)	2–1	(2L) Real Pharma Odesa	Marianivka, Kherson Oblast
	Zhavko 79'; Zakharchenko 88'	Report	Topal 31'	Stadium: Marianivskyi Stadium; Referee: D.Osaulenko (Kyiv)

30 August 2020	Epitsentr Dunaivtsi (2L)	4–0	(2L) Karpaty Lviv	Dunaivtsi, Khmelnytskyi Oblast
	Badlo 43'; Bui 67', 83', 88'	Report		Stadium: Kolos Stadium; Referee: I.Salash (Kalush)

30 August 2020	Olimpiya Savyntsi (AM)	1–2 (a.e.t.)	(1L) Hirnyk-Sport Horishni Plavni	Poltava
	Subochev 61' (pen.)	Report	Homenko 90'; Malyshkin 112'	Stadium: Lokomotyv Stadium (Poltava); Referee: Ya.Piesotskyi (Sumy)

8 September 2020	Dnipro Cherkasy (2L)	0–5	(1L) Veres Rivne	Cherkasy
		Report	Miroshnyk 3'; Petko 13'; Shestakov 35', 45'; Hehedosh 89'	Stadium: Tsentralnyi Stadion; Referee: O.Tytov (Donetsk)

9 September 2020	Metalurh Zaporizhya (2L)	0–0 (a.e.t.) (4–3 p)	(1L) Avanhard Kramatorsk	Zaporizhya
		Report		Stadium: Slavutych Arena; Attendance: 853; Referee: K.Zabroda (Kyiv)

=== Second preliminary round (1/32) ===
In this round, 3 clubs from the First League entered the competition and joined the 19 winners of the First preliminary round (11 clubs from First League, 7 – Second League, 1 – amateurs).

The draw was held on 10 September 2020.

16 September 2020	VPK-Ahro Shevchenkivka (1L)	2–2 (a.e.t.) (4–2 p)	(1L) Kremin Kremenchuk	Dnipro
	I. Bilyi 75'; Tyshchenko 87'	Report	Ostrovskyi 8'; Kulish 44'	Stadium: Meteor Stadium; Attendance: 900; Referee: Yevhen Nazarov (Kharkiv)

16 September 2020	MFC Mykolaiv (1L)	1–0	(1L) Chornomorets Odesa	Mykolaiv
	Yavorskyi 41'	Report		Stadium: Central City Stadium; Attendance: 450; Referee: Ihor Paskhal (Kherson)

16 September 2020	Nyva Vinnytsia (2L)	2–2 (a.e.t.) (4–3 p)	(1L) Krystal Kherson	Vinnytsia
	Popov 45'; Pastushenko 65'	Report	Malysh 35'; Terzi 86'	Stadium: Central City Stadium; Referee: Anastasia Romaniuk (Ivano-Frankivsk)

16 September 2020	Kryvbas Kryvyi Rih (2L)	4–1	(2L) Tavriya Simferopol	Kryvyi Rih, Dnipropetrovsk Oblast
	Cherniy 3', 20'; Dediaiev 66'; Piatov 66'	Report	Sokolan 90+1'	Stadium: Hirnyk Stadium; Referee: Andriy Kovalenko (Poltava)

16 September 2020	Alians Lypova Dolyna (1L)	0–3	(1L) Veres Rivne	Okhtyrka, Sumy Oblast
		Report	Dakhnovskyi 53'; Solomka 66'; Petko 69'	Stadium: Naftovyk Stadium; Referee: Oleksandr Solovian (Kyiv)

16 September 2020	Viktoriya Mykolaivka (AM)	0–0 (a.e.t.) (8–7 p)	(2L) Dinaz Vyshhorod	Mykolaivka, Sumy Oblast
		Report		Stadium: Viktoriya Stadium; Referee: Oleksandr Afanasiev (Kharkiv)

16 September 2020	Obolon Kyiv (1L)	0–1	(1L) Polissia Zhytomyr	Kyiv
		Report	Halenko 49'	Stadium: Obolon Arena; Referee: Oleksandr Shandor (Lviv)

16 September 2020	Volyn Lutsk (1L)	0–1	(1L) Prykarpattia Ivano-Frankivsk	Lutsk
		Report	Barchuk 29' (pen.)	Stadium: Avanhard Stadium; Referee: Roman Blavatskyi (Lviv)

16 September 2020	FC Uzhhorod (2L)	0–1	(1L) Ahrobiznes Volochysk	Uzhhorod
		Report	M. Kohut 9'	Stadium: Avanhard Stadium; Attendance: 200; Referee: Oleksandr Kalenov (Lviv)

17 September 2020	Epitsentr Dunaivtsi (2L)	3–0	(1L) Nyva Ternopil	Dunaivtsi, Khmelnytskyi Oblast
	Barbosa da Silva 37', 87'; Bui 77'	Report		Stadium: Kolos Stadium; Attendance: 500; Referee: Henadiy Serputko (Odesa)

17 September 2020	Metalurh Zaporizhia (2L)	1–4	(1L) Hirnyk-Sport Horishni Plavni	Zaporizhia
	Oliynyk 85'	Report	Zbun 10'; Batiushyn 55'; Tverdokhilb 80'; Herasymets 90'	Stadium: Slavutych Arena; Attendance: 700; Referee: Ihor Bych (Kyiv)

=== Round of 32 (1/16) ===
In this round, 11 clubs from the Premier League will enter the competition and join the 11 winners of the Second preliminary round (7 clubs from First League, 3 – Second League, 1 – amateurs).

The draw was held on 18 September 2020.

30 September 2020	Polissia Zhytomyr (1L)	1–2	(PL) FC Mynai	Kyiv
	Prokopchuk 45'	Report	Shevchenko 5' (o.g.); Sakiv 57'	Stadium: Training Complex imeni Viktora Bannikova; Attendance: 0 Referee: Dmytro Kryvushkin (Kharkiv)

30 September 2020	Prykarpattia Ivano-Frankivsk (1L)	0–1	(PL) Kolos Kovalivka	Ivano-Frankivsk
		Report	Orikhovskyi 89' (pen.)	Stadium: Stadion Rukh; Attendance: 1,100; Referee: Oleksandr Shandor (Lviv)

30 September 2020	Vorskla Poltava (PL)	2 – 0 (Note: The official UAF match report for Vorskla – Lviv game, listed the FC Lviv's head coach as Vadym Deonas, while the FC Lviv's website has Giorgi Tsetsadze.)	(PL) FC Lviv	Poltava
	Kulach 78', 82'	Report		Stadium: Stadion Vorskla imeni Oleksiya Butovskoho; Attendance: 546; Referee: Maksym Kozyriatskyi (Zaporizhia)

30 September 2020	FC Oleksandriya (PL)	4–1	(PL) Inhulets Petrove	Oleksandriya, Kirovohrad Oblast
	Sitalo 57'; Banada 63'; Luchkevych 70'; Zaderaka 75'	Report	Lytviak 83'	Stadium: CSC Nika; Attendance: 726; Referee: Dmytro Bondarenko (Odesa)

30 September 2020	Kryvbas Kryvyi Rih (2L)	0–1	(2L) Nyva Vinnytsia	Kryvyi Rih, Dnipropetrovsk Oblast
		Report	Braslavskyi 70'	Stadium: Stadion Hirnyk; Attendance: 535; Referee: Yuriy Ivanov (Makiivka)

30 September 2020	Epitsentr Dunaivtsi (2L)	1–2	(1L) Ahrobiznes Volochysk	Dunaivtsi, Khmelnytskyi Oblast
	Ivashko 21' (pen.)	Report	Semeniuk 7' (pen.); M.Kohut 90+2'	Stadium: Stadion Kolos; Attendance: 385; Referee: Kostiantyn Trukhanov (Kharkiv)

30 September 2020	Veres Rivne (1L)	4–2 (a.e.t.)	(1L) MFC Mykolaiv	Mlyniv, Rivne Oblast
	Petko 42'; Hehedosh 82'; Pasich 107'; Serhiychuk 118'	Report	Vitenchuk 16' (pen.); Sula 70' (pen.)	Stadium: Stadion Kolos; Attendance: 0 Referee: Hennadiy Serputko (Odesa)

30 September 2020	Hirnyk-Sport Horishni Plavni (1L)	3–5 (a.e.t.)	(PL) SC Dnipro-1	Horishni Plavni, Poltava Oblast
	Karas 25'; Sukhanov 43' (pen.); Herasymets 51'	Report	Dovbyk 16', 98', 108'; Batahov 23'; Buletsa 39'	Stadium: Sport Complex Yunist; Attendance: 550; Referee: Viktor Kopievskyi (Kropyvnytskyi)

30 September 2020	Desna Chernihiv (PL)	2–1	(PL) Rukh Lviv	Chernihiv
	Dehtyarov 75', 81'	Report	Tamm 59' (o.g.)	Stadium: Stadion imeni Yuriya Gagarina; Attendance: 1,250; Referee: Andriy Kovalenko (Poltava)

30 September 2020	Viktoriya Mykolaivka (AM)	1–3	(PL) FC Mariupol	Mykolaivka, Sumy Oblast
	Kasyanov 16'	Report	Topalov 70'; Chobotenko 82'; Peterman 90+1'	Stadium: Stadion Viktoriya; Attendance: 112; Referee: Yuriy Mozharovskyi (Lviv)

13 November 2020	VPK-Ahro Shevchenkivka (1L)	1 – 0 (Note: Originally scheduled on 1 October 2020, the game between VPK-Ahro – Olimpik was canceled, because more than half of the VPK-Ahro's squad were diagnosed COVID-19 positive. On 9 October 2020 it was announced that the game will take place on 13 November 2020.)	(PL) Olimpik Donetsk	Dnipro
14:00	Sydorenko 47' (pen.)	Report		Stadium: Stadion Meteor; Referee: Oleksiy Derevynskyi (Kyiv)

- Notes:

=== Round of 16 (1/8) ===
In this round, Zorya Luhansk from the Premier League will enter the competition and join the 11 winners of the Third preliminary round (8 clubs from Premier League, 3 – First League, 1 – Second League).

The draw was held on 27 October 2020. The game Desna – Zorya was postponed to 16 December 2020.

2 December 2020	Nyva Vinnytsia (2L)	0–4	(PL) Kolos Kovalivka	Vinnytsia
13:00		Report	Orikhovskyi 40', 67'; Kostyshyn 83' (pen.); Koval 90+1'	Stadium: Central City Stadium; Referee: O.Shandor (Lviv)

2 December 2020	Veres Rivne (1L)	1–0	(PL) Mariupol	Mlyniv, Rivne Oblast
13:00	Hehedosh 67'	Report		Stadium: Kolos Stadium; Referee: O.Derdo (Chornomorsk)

2 December 2020	VPK-Ahro Shevchenkivka (1L)	0–5	(PL) Dnipro-1	Dnipro
13:00		Report	Safronov 24'; Nazarenko 46', 58'; Dovbyk 72' (pen.); Kohut 90+2'	Stadium: Meteor Stadium; Referee: H.Serputko (Odesa)

2 December 2020	Ahrobiznes Volochysk (1L)	1–0	(PL) Vorskla Poltava	Poltava
14:00	Chernenko 25'	Report	Vasin (penalty missed) 44'	Stadium: Vorskla Stadium; Referee: V.Novokhatniy (Kyiv)

2 December 2020	Oleksandriya (PL)	3–0	(PL) Mynai	Oleksandriia, Kirovohrad Oblast
16:30	Vantukh 6'; Bondarenko 62' (pen.); Dovhyi 90+4'	Report		Stadium: Nika Stadium; Referee: Yevhen Aranovskyi (Kyiv)

16 December 2020	Desna Chernihiv (PL)	0–1	(PL) Zorya Luhansk	Kyiv
14:00		Report	Yurchenko 16' (pen.)	Stadium: Valeriy Lobanovskyi Dynamo Stadium; Referee: D.Shurman (Kyiv Oblast)

=== Quarter-finals (1/4) ===
In this round, Shakhtar Donetsk and Dynamo Kyiv from the Premier League will enter the competition and join the 6 winners of the Round of 16 (4 clubs from Premier League, 2 – First League).

The draw was held on 18 December 2020.

3 March 2021	Veres Rivne (1L)	1 – 2	(PL) Zorya Luhansk	Lutsk
	Shestakov 18' (pen.)	Report	Ivanisenia 25'; Kocherhin 59'	Stadium: Avanhard Stadium; Attendance: 2,042; Referee: Maksym Kozyriatskyi (Zaporizhia)

3 March 2021	Dynamo Kyiv (PL)	0 – 0 (a.e.t.) (4–3 p)	(PL) Kolos Kovalivka	Kyiv
		Report		Stadium: Olimpiyskiy National Sports Complex; Attendance: 3,421; Referee: D.Shurman (Kyiv Oblast)
	Penalties
	Shaparenko (penalty scored); Supriaha (penalty scored); Rodrigues (penalty scored); Lyednyev (penalty missed); Karavayev (penalty missed); Andriyevskyi (penalty scored)		Orikhovskyi (penalty scored); Petrov (penalty scored); Milko (penalty scored); Zadoya (penalty missed); Havrysh (penalty missed); Ilyin (penalty missed)

3 March 2021	SC Dnipro-1 (PL)	1 – 1 (a.e.t.) (3–4 p)	(PL) FC Oleksandriya	Dnipro
	Buletsa 79'	Report	Tretyakov 62'	Stadium: Dnipro Arena; Attendance: 2,367; Referee: O.Shandor (Lviv)
	Penalties
	Dovbyk (penalty missed); Douglas (penalty scored); Pikhalyonok (penalty scored); Khoblenko (penalty scored); Buletsa (penalty missed)		Melnyk (penalty scored); Babohlo (penalty scored); Bondarenko (penalty scored); Stetskov (penalty scored)

3 March 2021	Ahrobiznes Volochysk (1L)	1 – 0 (a.e.t.)	(PL) Shakhtar Donetsk	Kyiv
	B.Semenets 96'	Report		Stadium: Valeriy Lobanovskyi Dynamo Stadium; Attendance: 4,200; Referee: Serhiy Boyko (Kyiv Oblast)

=== Semi-finals (1/2) ===
The base date for matches of this round is 21 April 2021. The draw was held on 4 March 2021.

21 April 2021	Ahrobiznes Volochysk (1L)	0 – 3	(PL) Dynamo Kyiv	Ternopil
16:00		Report	Lyednyev 45'; Besyedin 68'; Buyalskyi 81'	Stadium: Ternopil City Stadium; Attendance: 4,020; Referee: M.Kozyriatskyi (Zaporizhia)

21 April 2021	FC Oleksandriya (PL)	1 – 1 (3–4 p)	(PL) Zorya Luhansk	Oleksandriya, Kirovohrad Oblast
18:30	Bondarenko 90+1' (pen.)	Report	Kocherhin 20'	Stadium: CSC Nika Stadium; Referee: I.Paskhal (Kherson)
	Penalties
	Shastal (penalty scored); Bondarenko (penalty scored); Myshenko (penalty scored); Dubra (penalty missed); Stetskov (penalty missed)		Nazaryna (penalty scored); Zahedi (penalty scored); Ivanisenya (penalty missed); Yurchenko (penalty scored); Favorov (penalty scored)

=== Final ===
The city of Ternopil hosted its first Ukrainian Cup final at Ternopilsky Misky Stadion and first major competition final overall, after the previous season's final was initially moved from Ternopil to Lviv and then moved again to Kharkiv due to the COVID-19 pandemic in Ukraine.

13 May 2021	Dynamo Kyiv (PL)	1 – 0 (a.e.t.)	(PL) Zorya Luhansk	Ternopil
19:00	Tsyhankov 98'	Report		Stadium: Ternopil City Stadium; Attendance: 3,000; Referee: Yuriy Ivanov (Makiivka, Donetsk Oblast)

== Top goalscorers ==
The competition's top ten goalscorers including preliminary rounds.

As of 13 May 2021

Rank	Scorer	Team	Goals (Pen.)
1	(Ukraine) Mykola Buy	Epitsentr Dunaivtsi	4
1	(Ukraine) Robert Hehedosh	Veres Rivne	4
1	(Ukraine) Artem Dovbyk	SC Dnipro-1	4 (1)
4	(Ukraine) Pavlo Orikhovskyi	Kolos Kovalivka	3
4	(Ukraine) Oleksandr Pyatov	Kryvbas Kryvyi Rih	3
4	(Ukraine) Mykhaylo Shestakov	Veres Rivne	3 (1)

== See also ==
- 2020–21 Ukrainian Premier League
- 2020–21 Ukrainian First League
- 2020–21 Ukrainian Second League
- 2020–21 Ukrainian Amateur Cup
