= 2023 Football Championship of Poltava Oblast =

Football Championship of Poltava Oblast
- Season: 2023
- Dates: 29 April 2023 –
- Champions: Olympia Savyntsi

The 2023 Football Championship of Poltava Oblast began on 29 April 2023. Standard Novi Sanzhary are the defending champions.

== Teams ==
24 teams are taking part in this years competition. 8 are participating in Vyshcha Liha, which will conduct a usual double round-robin tournament. The other 16 teams are playing in First League, split into two groups of 8. The first stage will also play the usual double round-robin tournament. At the second stage a playoff will be held to determine the champion. On 20 July the calendar for second half of first stage matches was released.

Dmytro Lunin, Head of Poltava Oblast Military Administration banned all mass event from 21 August. Due to that order games in the competition to be played 26 and 27 August were postponed.

On 16-17 September final matches were played in First league. Top two teams from each group will enter play-off stage.

== Vyshcha Liha ==
=== Stadiums and locations ===
Home venues of teams in the 2023 Vyshcha Liha

Note: Table lists in alphabetical order.

| Team | Location | Stadium | Capacity |
|---|---|---|---|
| Druzhba | Ocheretuvate | Kolos | |
| DYuFSh Vorskla | Poltava | Molodizhnyi | 547 |
| Invasport | Poltava | Molodizhnyi | 547 |
| Olimpiia | Myrhorod | Start | 1,500 |
| Lubny | Lubny | Torpedo | |
| Rokyta | Rokyta | Maiak | |
| Standart Novi Sanzhary | Novi Sanzhary | Novi Sanzhary | 500 |
| Velyki Sorochyntsi | Velyki Sorochyntsi | Kolos | |

=== Table ===
| Pos | Team | Pld | W | D | L | GF | GA | GD | Pts | |
|---|---|---|---|---|---|---|---|---|---|---|
| 1 | Olympia Savyntsi (C) | 14 | 13 | 1 | 0 | 46 | 8 | +38 | 40 | Champion |
| 2 | Rokyta | 14 | 10 | 2 | 2 | 30 | 18 | +12 | 32 | Silver Medals |
| 3 | Standart Novi Sanzhary | 14 | 8 | 2 | 4 | 35 | 14 | +21 | 26 | Bronze Medals |
| 4 | Kolos Velyki Sorochyntsi | 14 | 6 | 3 | 5 | 25 | 18 | +7 | 21 | |
| 5 | Druzhba Ocheretuvate | 14 | 5 | 1 | 8 | 19 | 26 | −7 | 16 | |
| 6 | FC Lubny | 14 | 4 | 3 | 7 | 16 | 29 | −13 | 15 | |
| 7 | Invasport Poltava | 14 | 3 | 2 | 9 | 22 | 25 | −3 | 11 | |
| 8 | DYuFSh Vorskla Poltava | 14 | 0 | 0 | 14 | 8 | 63 | −55 | 0 | |

Source: start.uaf.ua
Rules for classification: 1) Points; 2) Head-to-head points.
(C) Champions

=== Results ===
Teams played each other twice on a home and away basis.

| Home \ Away | DRU | DYuFSh VOR | INV | LBN | OLM | ROK | STD | VSR |
|---|---|---|---|---|---|---|---|---|
| Druzhba Ocheretuvate | — | 4–1 | 2–1 | 0–1 | 1–3 (Note: Postponed, due to Olympia participation in 2022–23 Ukrainian Football Amateur League, was played on 16 July.) | 0–3 (Note: Match was cancelled on 23 September due to a ban by local authorities. On 1 October Rokyta was awarded a 3–0 win.) | 1–2 | 2–1 |
| DYuFSh Vorskla Poltava | 1–4 | — | 0–5 | 0–1 | 0–7 | 2–4 | 0–7 | 1–6 |
| Invasport Poltava | 0–0 | 3–0 | — | 3–3 | 0–2 | 0–1 | 0–3 | 0–5 |
| FC Lubny | 0–1 | 6–1 | 0–7 | — | 1–4 (Note: Postponed, due to Olympia participation in 2022–23 Ukrainian Football Amateur League, was played on 31 August.) | 2–4 | 0–2 | 1–1 |
| Olympia Savyntsi | 2–0 | 5–2 | 1–0 | 4–0 | — | 5–1 | 2–1 | 2–0 |
| Rokyta | 3–2 | 3–0 | 3–2 | 2–0 | 1–1 | — | 3–2 | 2–0 |
| Standart Novi Sanzhary | 4–0 | 5–0 | 4–1 | 0–0 | 1–3 (Note: Postponed, due to Olympia participation in 2022–23 Ukrainian Football Amateur League, was played on 15 July.) | 2–0 | — | 2–2 |
| Kolos Velyki Sorochyntsi | 4–2 | +/- (Note: DYuFSh Vorskla Poltava did not travel to face Kolos Velyki Sorochyntsi on 16 September. Vorskla was sanctioned with a 3–0 loss.) | 1–0 | 0–1 | 0–5 (Note: Postponed, due to Olympia participation in 2022–23 Ukrainian Football Amateur League, was played on 5 August.) | 0–0 | 2–0 | — |

Source: start.uaf.ua
Legend: Blue = home team win; Yellow = draw; Red = away team win.

=== Goalscorers ===
| Rank | Scorer | Team | Goals (Pen.) |
|---|---|---|---|
| 1 | (Ukraine) Yehor Chehurko | Velyki Sorochyntsi | 12 (0) |
| 2 | (Ukraine) Ivan Kuts | Rokyta | 10 (2) |
| 3 | (Ukraine) Anton Kicha | Standart Novi Sanzhary | 8 (1) |
| 3 | (Ukraine) Roman Kunyev | Olimpiya Savyntsi | 8 (0) |
| 4 | (Ukraine) Valeriy Kutsenko | Druzhba Ocheretuvate | 7 (0) |
| 5 | (Ukraine) Leonid Morozov | Invasport Poltava | 6 (1) |
| 6 | (Ukraine) Dmytro Verhun | Standart Novi Sanzhary | 5 (3) |
| 6 | (Ukraine) Vitaliy Subochev | Olimpiya Savyntsi | 5 (1) |
| 7 | (Ukraine) Vladyslav Kovtun | Olimpiya Savyntsi | 4 (0) |
| 7 | (Ukraine) Denys Bondarenko | Standart Novi Sanzhary | 4 (0) |
| 7 | (Ukraine) Vadym Burliai | Olimpiya Savyntsi | 4 (0) |

== First League Group A ==
=== Stadiums and locations ===
Note: Table lists in alphabetical order.

| Team | Location | Stadium | Capacity |
|---|---|---|---|
| Avrora | Poltava | Dynamo | 400 |
| Karlivka | Karlivka | Mashynobudivnyk Stadium | 1,300 |
| Reshetylivka | Reshetylivka | Kolos | |

=== Table ===
| Pos | Team | Pld | W | D | L | GF | GA | GD | Pts | Qualification or relegation |
|---|---|---|---|---|---|---|---|---|---|---|
| 1 | Karlivka | 14 | 13 | 1 | 0 | 66 | 16 | +50 | 40 | Qualification for the First League Playoff phase |
| 2 | Avrora Poltava | 14 | 11 | 0 | 3 | 72 | 21 | +51 | 33 | Qualification for the First League Playoff phase |
| 3 | Opishnia | 14 | 10 | 2 | 2 | 42 | 12 | +30 | 32 | |
| 4 | KSK Karlivka | 14 | 8 | 1 | 5 | 56 | 25 | +31 | 25 | |
| 5 | Reshetylivka | 14 | 6 | 0 | 8 | 36 | 27 | +9 | 18 | |
| 6 | DYuFS Horpynka | 14 | 4 | 0 | 10 | 30 | 62 | −32 | 12 | |
| 7 | Lider Kobeliaky | 14 | 2 | 0 | 12 | 13 | 101 | −88 | 6 | |
| 8 | Molod Poltava | 14 | 0 | 0 | 14 | 11 | 62 | −51 | 0 | |

Source: start.uaf.ua
Rules for classification: 1) Points; 2) Head-to-head points.

=== Results ===
Teams played each other twice on a home and away basis.

| Home \ Away | AVR | HOR | KAR | KSK | LID | MOL | OPI | RES |
|---|---|---|---|---|---|---|---|---|
| Avrora Poltava | — | 6–3 | 1–3 | 4–1 | 27–1 | 6–1 | 1–0 | 5–4 |
| DYuFS Horpynka | 1–4 | — | 0–6 | 1–3 | 7–2 | 4–0 | 0–2 | 0–4 |
| Karlivka | 2–1 | 15–2 | — | 3–2 | 11–2 | 2–0 | 1–1 | 4–2 |
| KSK Karlivka | 2–4 | 11–2 | 1–3 | — | 10–0 | 7–3 | 1–3 | 4–1 |
| Lider Kobeliaky | 1–3 | 1–5 | 2–6 | 0–5 | — | 3–1 | 0–4 | 0–5 |
| DYuFS Molod Poltava | 1–7 | 0–2 | 0–5 | 0–5 | 0–1 | — | 2–4 | 1–3 |
| Opishnia | 1–0 | 5–2 | 2–3 | 1–1 | 7–0 | 9–1 | — | 2–0 |
| Reshetylivka | 0–3 | 3–1 | 0–2 | 0–3 | 10–0 | 4–1 | 0–1 | — |

Source: start.uaf.ua
Legend: Blue = home team win; Yellow = draw; Red = away team win.

=== Goalscorers ===
| Rank | Scorer | Team | Goals (Pen.) |
|---|---|---|---|
| 1 | (Ukraine) Mykhailo Priadko | Avrora | 18 (3) |
| 2 | (Ukraine) Kostiantyn Truba | Avrora | 15 (0) |
| 3 | (Ukraine) Vladyslav Korniienko | KSK Karlivka | 14 (2) |
| 4 | (Ukraine) Nikita Ishchenko | Opishnia | 13 (0) |
| 4 | (Ukraine) Oleksandr Rudyk | Reshetylivka | 13 (1) |
| 4 | (Ukraine) Artem Kvasha | Karlivka | 12 (0) |
| 5 | (Ukraine) Mykyta Fomenko | Karlivka | 12 (1) |
| 5 | (Ukraine) Serhii Horbenko | DYuFS Horpynka | 12 (0) |
| 6 | (Ukraine) Roman Riabenko | Avrora | 11 (0) |
| 7 | (Ukraine) Vladyslav Hyria | KSK Karlivka | 10 (0) |
| 8 | (Ukraine) Yaroslav Myts | Avrora | 9 (1) |

== First League Group B ==
=== Table ===
| Pos | Team | Pld | W | D | L | GF | GA | GD | Pts | Qualification or relegation |
|---|---|---|---|---|---|---|---|---|---|---|
| 1 | Myrhorod | 14 | 11 | 1 | 2 | 49 | 18 | +31 | 34 | Qualification for the First League Playoff phase |
| 2 | Pyriatyn | 14 | 10 | 3 | 1 | 31 | 18 | +13 | 33 | Qualification for the First League Playoff phase |
| 3 | Kharchovyk Zavodske | 14 | 9 | 2 | 3 | 41 | 18 | +23 | 29 | |
| 4 | Sula Zasullia | 14 | 6 | 2 | 6 | 27 | 28 | −1 | 20 | |
| 5 | Sencha | 14 | 3 | 4 | 7 | 25 | 39 | −14 | 13 | |
| 6 | Komyshnia | 14 | 2 | 5 | 7 | 15 | 29 | −14 | 11 | |
| 7 | Lokomotyv Hrebinka | 14 | 1 | 5 | 8 | 14 | 30 | −16 | 8 | |
| 8 | Ahrarii Hadiach | 14 | 1 | 4 | 9 | 15 | 37 | −22 | 7 | |

Updated to match(es) played on 19 September 2023. Source: start.uaf.ua
Rules for classification: 1) Points; 2) Head-to-head points.

=== Results ===
Teams played each other twice on a home and away basis.

| Home \ Away | AHR | KHA | KOM | LOK | MYR | PYR | SEN | SUL |
|---|---|---|---|---|---|---|---|---|
| Ahrarii Hadiach | — | 0–2 | 1–1 | 1–1 | 1–4 | 1–2 | 2–1 | 0–2 |
| Kharchovyk Zavodske | 7–0 | — | +/- (Note: On 6 August Komyshnia did not show up to their match with Kharchovyk and was awarded a technical loss.) | 2–0 | 0–0 | 1–2 | 5–1 | 5–1 |
| Komyshnia | 2–1 | 1–1 | — | 4–1 | 0–5 | 1–2 | 1–1 | 0–5 |
| Lokomotyv Hrebinka | 1–1 | 1–4 | 1–1 | — | 0–3 | 3–3 | 2–2 | 2–0 |
| Myrhorod | 5–2 | 5–3 | 2–1 | 1–0 | — | 3–1 | 5–2 | 3–1 |
| Pyriatyn | 2–1 | 4–2 | 0–0 | 2–1 | 3–2 | — | 2–1 | 4–0 |
| Sencha | 5–2 | 2–3 | 3–2 | 3–3 | 0–8 | 1–1 | — | 0–0 |
| Sula Zasullia | 2–2 | 1–3 | 3–1 | 2–0 | 4–3 | 1–3 | 5–2 | — |

Updated to match(es) played on 18 September 2023. Source: start.uaf.ua
Legend: Blue = home team win; Yellow = draw; Red = away team win.

=== Goalscorers ===
| Rank | Scorer | Team | Goals (Pen.) |
|---|---|---|---|
| 1 | (Ukraine) Andrii Rudenko | Myrhorod | 23 (2) |
| 2 | (Ukraine) Maksym Kravchenko | Kharchovyk | 8 (2) |
| 3 | (Ukraine) Oleh Fil | Ahrarii | 7 (1) |
| 3 | (Ukraine) Ihor Kryvenko | Kharchovyk | 7 (0) |
| 3 | (Ukraine) Oleksandr Kryvko | Sencha | 7 (0) |
| 4 | (Ukraine) Vladyslav Komar | Sencha | 5 (0) |
| 4 | (Ukraine) Ivan Shmyhol | Pyriatyn | 5 (0) |
| 4 | (Ukraine) Artem Podriz | Sula | 5 (0) |
| 4 | (Ukraine) Vladyslav Shylypun | Pyriatyn | 5 (0) |
| 5 | (Ukraine) Karimzod Hulomov | Sula | 4 (0) |
| 5 | (Ukraine) Dmytro Kovyka | Pyriatyn | 4 (1) |

== First League Play-offs ==
Semi-finals
Avrora | 2 | 6 | 8
Myrhorod | 1 | 2 | 3
Karlivka | 5 | 3 | 8
Pyriatyn | 0 | 2 | 2

Final
Avrora | 2
Karlivka | 1

First leg

24 September 2023
10:00

| Avrora | 2–1 | Myrhorod |

Dynamo Stadium, Poltava
Referee: B. Shcherbakov
24 September 2023
13:00

| Karlivka | 5–0 | Pyriatyn |

Petro Rotan Stadium, Karlivka
Referee: Ya. Povazhnyi

Second leg

30 September 2023
10:00

| Myrhorod | 2–6 | Avrora |

1 October 2023
12:00

| Pyriatyn | 2–3 | Karlivka |

Yuvileinyi Stadium, Pyriatyn

Third place play-off

15 October 2023

| Pyriatyn | 1–3 | Myrhorod |

Final

15 October 2023
13:00

| Avrora | 2–1 (a.e.t.) | Karlivka |
|---|---|---|
| Priadko ?' |

Molodizhnyi Stadium, Poltava
