= Brovchenko =

Brovchenko (Ukrainian: Бровченко) is a Ukrainian surname. Notable people with the surname include:

- Viktor Brovchenko (born 1976), Ukrainian footballer
- Yuriy Brovchenko (born 1988), Ukrainian footballer
