= Serhiy Lohinov =

Ukrainian footballer

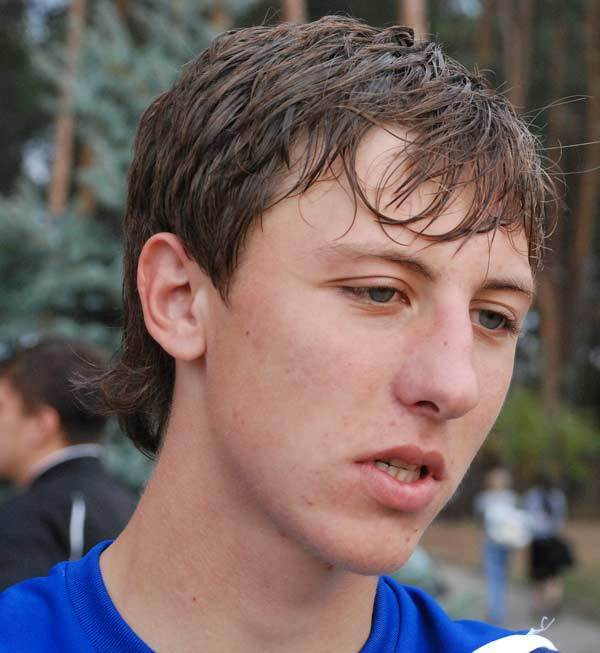

Personal information
- Full name: Serhiy Mykolayovych Lohinov
- Date of birth: 24 August 1990 (age 36)
- Place of birth: Dnipropetrovsk, Soviet Union (now Ukraine)
- Height: 1.90 m (6 ft 3 in)
- Position: Centre-back

Youth career
- 2002–2003: ATB Olimp Dnipropetrovsk
- 2005: Youth Sportive School #12 Dnipropetrovsk
- 2005: Yuvileynyi Dnipropetrovsk
- 2006–2007: Dnipro Dnipropetrovsk

Senior career*
Years	Team	Apps	(Gls)
2008	Dnipro-75 Dnipropetrovsk	33	(3)
2009–2013	Dynamo Kyiv	0	(0)
2009	→ Dynamo-2 Kyiv	3	(0)
2010–2011	→ Prykarpattia Ivano-Frankivsk (loan)	21	(1)
2011–2012	→ Sūduva Marijampolė (loan)	47	(5)
2013	→ Dynamo-2 Kyiv	7	(0)
2013–2014	Kremin Kremenchuk	25	(2)
2014–2015	Vorskla Poltava	0	(0)
2015–2017	Volyn Lutsk	34	(0)
2017–2023	Dnipro-1	122	(12)
2023	→ Oleksandriya (loan)	13	(2)
2023–2025	Oleksandriya	24	(0)
2025	Standart Novi Sanzhary	1	(0)
2026	Metalurh Zaporizhzhia	0	(0)
Total		330	(28)

International career
2009	Ukraine U19	2	(0)
Medal record
Men's football
Representing Ukraine
UEFA European Under-19 Championship
Winner	2009 Ukraine
- * Club domestic league appearances and goals

Serhiy Mykolayovych Lohinov (Ukrainian: Сергій Миколайович Логінов; born 24 August 1990) is a former Ukrainian professional footballer who played as a centre-back.

== Personal life ==
His brother Oleksandr Lohinov is also a professional footballer.

== Honours ==
Ukraine U19

- UEFA European Under-19 Championship: 2009
