= Oleksandr Mihunov =

Ukrainian footballer

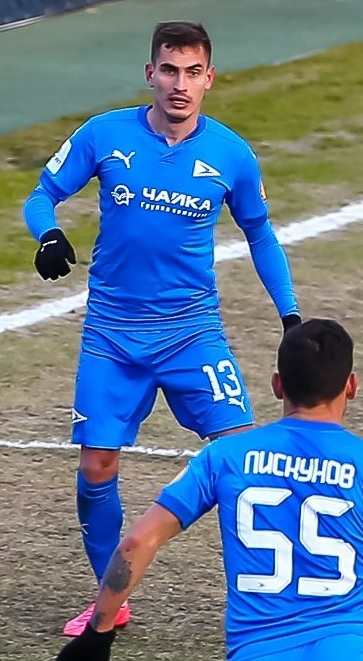
- Mihunov with Chayka in 2021

Personal information
- Full name: Oleksandr Yuriyovych Mihunov
- Date of birth: 13 April 1994 (age 32)
- Place of birth: Donetsk, Ukraine
- Height: 1.72 m (5 ft 8 in)
- Position: Midfielder

Team information
- Current team: Standart Novi Sanzhary
- Number: 13

Youth career
- 2008–2011: Dnipro Dnipropetrovsk

Senior career*
Years	Team	Apps	(Gls)
2011–2015	Dnipro Dnipropetrovsk	3	(0)
2015–2017	Shakhtar Donetsk	0	(0)
2015–2016	→ Illichivets Mariupol (loan)	28	(2)
2017	→ Illichivets Mariupol (loan)	11	(0)
2017	→ Olimpik Donetsk (loan)	11	(0)
2018	Shakhter Karagandy	15	(1)
2018	Dnipro-1	5	(0)
2019	Kolos Kovalivka	15	(1)
2020	Rukh Brest	27	(1)
2021	Chayka Peschanokopskoye	11	(0)
2022–2023	LNZ Cherkasy	5	(0)
2023	Skoruk Tomakivka	6	(1)
2023	Poltava	18	(0)
2024	Nyva Buzova	5	(0)
2024–	Standart Novi Sanzhary		

International career
2014–2015	Ukraine U21	11	(0)
- * Club domestic league appearances and goals as of 31 May 2024

Oleksandr Mihunov (Ukrainian: Олександр Юрійович Мігунов; born 13 April 1994) is a Ukrainian football midfielder who plays for Standart Novi Sanzhary.

== Career ==
Mihunov is a product of FC Dnipro youth sportive school system. In 2011, he was promoted to the FC Dnipro Dnipropetrovsk Reserves Team. He made his debut for FC Dnipro in the match against FC Olimpik Donetsk on 22 September 2014 in the Ukrainian Premier League.

In July 2015 he signed a contract with another Ukrainian Premier League club Shakhtar Donetsk and went on loan for one year to FC Illichivets Mariupol in the Ukrainian First League.

On 2 July 2021, Russian Football Union decided to relegate Chayka Peschanokopskoye from second-tier FNL back to the third-tier PFL for the 2021–22 season for fixing games in the 2018–19 season. As foreign players are not allowed to play in the PFL, that meant a release from his contract with Chayka.

In February 2023 he signed for Skoruk Tomakivka.
