= FC Standart Novi Sanzhary =

Ukrainian football club from Novi Sanzhary, Ukraine

Standart Novi Sanzhary
- Full name: Football Club Standart Novi Sanzhary
- Founded: 1971
- Ground: Standart, Novi Sanzhary
- Capacity: 500
- President: Serhiy Tyutyunnyk
- Head coach: Oleksandr Obrevko
- 2023: 3rd
Home colours

Football Club Standart Novi Sanzhary (Ukrainian: Футбольний клуб Стандарт Нові Санжари); is a Ukrainian football team based in Novi Sanzhary, Ukraine.

== History ==
Club was formed in 1971. However Lomov states that it was created in 1973. Three young workers of the local company "Silhosptekhnika" (Agricultural Equipment) Mykola Neporada, Anatolii Semyvolos and Mykola Moroz decided to create a football team with support of head engineer Mykhailo Nakonechnyi. During 1974 the team took part in Poltava Oblast championship of Kolos sports society and received medals. In 1976 the team became a Champion in first group. Local footballer Vasyl Radchych was behind the Standart name. By 1978 club finished forth in the Oblast Championship. From mid 2000s over the next decade club was surviving in the lower part of the league. In 2018 Serhii Tiutiunnyk became the new president. During 2019 the team fielded an ineligible player under a false name. Also club was facing lack of financing from the regional government, being funded solely by their president. This along with other reasons forced the team to withdraw from that year's First League championship. Next season Dmytro Milko joined the team as manager. He won bronze medals with Naftohaz during previous year. He brought with him numerous Naftohaz players. A year later he was replaced by Oleksii Rotan. In 2021 the club finished second in the league and lost in the cup final. On 26 November 2022 the team won its first Poltava Oblast Championship and again finished second. During 2023 they finished third, receiving bronze medals. In 2024 they began playing in Dnipropetrovsk Oblast. They won the cup in that season.

== Name change ==
- Silhosptekhnika Novi Sanzhary (1971–~1977)
- Standart Novi Sanzhary (~1977–2019)
- Standart-Naftohaz Novi Sanzhary (2020)
- Standart Novi Sanzhary (2021–present)

== Players ==
=== Current squad ===
As of 27 August 2024

Note: Flags indicate national team as defined under FIFA eligibility rules; some limited exceptions apply. Players may hold more than one non-FIFA nationality.

No.	Pos.	Nation	Player
—	DF	UKR	Illya Ichuaidze
30	MF	UKR	Denys Bondarenko
96	MF	UKR	Dmytro Verhun
—	DF	UKR	Serhiy Vovkodav
1		UKR	Hryhoriy Datsenko
17	FW	UKR	Yevhen Drozd
24	DF	UKR	Bohdan Zhinchyn
—	DF	UKR	Volodymyr Kirychuk
10	FW	UKR	Anton Kicha
—	DF	UKR	Maksym Korzh
88	DF	UKR	Anton Kravchenko
77	MF	UKR	Hlib Lityuk
14		UKR	Serhiy Lavrenov
4	DF	UKR	Oleksandr Lohinov

No.	Pos.	Nation	Player
33	MF	UKR	Oleksandr Mihunov
—	MF	UKR	Roman Myronenko
6		UKR	Yevhen Nechosov
8	MF	UKR	Danylo Panov
35		UKR	Oleksandr Pysarenko
9	MF	UKR	Petro Plachkov
87		UKR	Serhiy Povstyanyi
12	GK	UKR	Vitaliy Postranskyi
7	MF	UKR	Oleksiy Razuvayev
—	FW	UKR	Artem Sinchikov
23	DF	UKR	Ivan Sviripa
18		UKR	Dmytro Slyusar
—	MF	UKR	Kamil Khuchbarov
5	DF	UKR	Serhiy Shvey

== League and cup history ==
Season	Div.	Pos.	Pl.	W	D	L	GS	GA	P	Domestic Cup	Notes
1977	Regional	7	22	9	2	11	40	44	20		
1978	Regional	4	24	12	5	7	59	38	29		
1979	Regional	5	-	-	-	-	-	-	-		Zone 1
1979	Regional	11	-	-	-	-	-	-	-		9-16 Places Group
1980	Regional	5	26	13	5	8	60	40	31		
1981	Regional	10	-	-	-	-	-	-	-		Zone 1
1983	Regional	-	-	-	-	-	-	-	-		Qualification Zone 2
1983	Regional	8	18	5	2	11	29	41	12		Group 1
1985	Regional	-	-	-	-	-	-	-	-		Group 2
1986	Regional	3	20	15	0	5	47	28	50		Group 2
1987	Regional	9	26	9	3	14	21	41	47		Group 1
1988	Regional	13	24	3	5	16	-	-	11		Group 1
1989	Regional	-	24	-	-	-	-	-	16		Group 2 (Zone 1)
1990	Regional	22	22	12	3	7	54	31	27		Group 2 (Zone 1)
1991	Regional	7	22	9	3	10	-	-	21		Group 2 (Zone 2)
1992	Regional	5	12	5	1	6	-	-	11		Group 2 (Zone 1)
1992–93	Regional	9	18	5	3	10	-	-	13		Group 2 (Zone 1)
1993–94	Regional	5	20	8	7	5	-	-	23		Group 2 (Zone 2)
1994–95	Regional	8	16	4	2	9(1)	-	-	25		Group 2 (South Zone)
1995–96	Regional	8	-	-	-	-	-	-	27		Group 2 (Zone 2)
2003–04	Regional	7	18	6	2	10	16	36	20		Second League Group B
2004–05	Regional	11	18	0	2	16	9	28	2		Second League Group B
2008	Regional	8	21	6	7	8	21	36	25		Second League (Group B)
2009	Regional	10	22	5	5	12	31	45	20		Second League (Group A)
2009	Regional	10	22	6	4	12	21	34	22		Second League (Group B)
2011	Regional	7	18	4	3	11	20	48	15		Second League (Group B)
2012	Regional	9	18	5	2	11	26	43	17		First League
2013	Regional	9	16	2	3	11	18	60	9		First League (Group B)
2014	Regional	8	14	1	3	10	13	43	6		First League (Group B)
2015	Regional	7	12	0	2	9	10	36	3		First League (Group B)
2016	Regional	11	22	1	1	20	19	80	4		First League (Group B)
2017	Regional	8	16	3	2	11	24	54	11		First League (Group B)
2018	Regional	5	19	9	1	6	31	27	29		First League (Group A)
2020	Regional	5	14	6	1	7	18	22	19		
2021	Regional	1	15	12	3	0	65	13	39		Group B
2021	Regional	2	14	9	3	2	43	15	30		
2022	Regional	1	6	4	0	2	24	15	12		Group G
2022	Regional	1	14	11	3	0	43	12	36		
2023	Regional	3	14	8	2	4	35	14	26		

== Honours ==
Poltava Oblast Champions

- Winners (1): 2022
- Runners-up (1): 2021
- Third Place (1): 2023

Poltava Oblast Cup

- Runners-up (2): 2021, 2022

Dnipropetrovsk Oblast Cup

- Winners (1): 2024

== Managers ==
- Vitaliy Baranovych (2012–2019)
- Dmytro Milko (2000)
- Oleksiy Rotan (2021–2022)
- Vitaliy Postranskyi (2022–2024)
- Oleksandr Obrevko (2024–present)

== Sources ==
- Lomov, Anatolii; Stadnychenko, Oleksandr (2009), 100 Років Полтавському Футболу [100 Years of Poltava Football] (in Ukrainian), Poltava: Poltava, ISBN 978-966-97035-0-7
- Lomov, Anatolii; Kryvorotko, Serhii (2010), Энциклопеди Полтавского Футбола (1909-2010) [Encyclopedia of Poltava Football (1909-2010)] (in Russian), Poltava: OOO "ASMI", ISBN 978-966-182-118-6
- Pyrukhin, Yurii, Энциклопедия кременчугского футбола [Encyclopedia of Kremenchuk football] (in Russian), Kremenchuk
