= Anton Sytnykov =

Ukrainian footballer

Personal information
- Full name: Anton Oleksandrovych Sytnykov
- Date of birth: 12 July 1991 (age 35)
- Place of birth: Dniprorudne, Soviet Union (now Ukraine)
- Height: 1.82 m (6 ft 0 in)
- Position: Goalkeeper

Youth career
- 2004–2005: Metalurh Zaporizhzhia
- 2005–2008: Dynamo Kyiv

Senior career*
Years	Team	Apps	(Gls)
2008–2009	Dynamo Kyiv	0	(0)
2008–2009	→ Dynamo-3 Kyiv	0	(0)
2009	CSKA Kyiv	1	(0)
2009	Veres Rivne	7	(0)
2010–2011	Lviv	11	(0)
2010–2011	→ Lviv-2	1	(0)
2011–2013	Zirka Kirovohrad	21	(0)
2013–2017	Hirnyk-Sport Horishni Plavni	121	(0)
2017–2018	Obolon-Brovar Kyiv	10	(0)
2018–2019	Inhulets Petrove	18	(0)
2019–2020	Hirnyk-Sport Horishni Plavni	34	(0)
2021	Mykolaiv	0	(0)
2021	→ Mykolaiv-2	1	(0)
2021–2022	Livyi Bereh Kyiv	6	(0)
2022–2023	Wohlen	18	(0)

International career
2009	Ukraine U19	5	(0)
- * Club domestic league appearances and goals

Anton Oleksandrovych Sytnykov (Ukrainian: Антон Олександрович Ситников; born 12 July 1991) is a professional Ukrainian football goalkeeper.

== Career ==
Sytnykov was one of four new players signed by FC Lviv during March 2010 in an effort to achieve promotion to the Ukrainian Premier League. Manager Algimantas Liubinskas believed Sytnykov would challenge for a spot in the first team, and he made his debut against FC Nyva Ternopil on 20 March 2010.
