= Oleksandr Lohinov =

Ukrainian footballer

Personal information
- Full name: Oleksandr Mykolayovych Lohinov
- Date of birth: 23 July 1991 (age 35)
- Place of birth: Dnipropetrovsk, Soviet Union (now Ukraine)
- Height: 1.90 m (6 ft 3 in)
- Position: Centre-back

Youth career
- 2002–2003: ATB Olimp Dnipropetrovsk
- 2005: Youth Sport School #12 Dnipropetrovsk
- 2005: Yuvileynyi Dnipropetrovsk
- 2006–2008: Dnipro Dnipropetrovsk

Senior career*
Years	Team	Apps	(Gls)
2008–2009	Kryvbas Kryvyi Rih	0	(0)
2010–2011	Dnipro Dnipropetrovsk	0	(0)
2011–2012	Kryvbas Kryvyi Rih	0	(0)
2012	Zhemchuzhyna Yalta	14	(0)
2013–2014	Zirka Kirovohrad	18	(0)
2014	Stal Alchevsk	16	(1)
2015	Kremin Kremenchuk	22	(0)
2016	Veres Rivne	9	(1)
2016–2017	Naftovyk-Ukrnafta Okhtyrka	23	(1)
2017	Isloch	5	(0)
2018	Naftovyk-Ukrnafta Okhtyrka	10	(1)
2018	Veres Rivne	12	(0)
2019	Polissya Zhytomyr	7	(0)
2019–2020	VPK-Ahro Shevchenkivka	25	(1)
2021	Krystal Kherson	11	(0)
2021–2022	Bukovyna Chernivtsi	14	(1)
2023–	Standart Novi Sanzhary		
- * Club domestic league appearances and goals as of 24 August 2022

Oleksandr Mykolayovych Lohinov (Ukrainian: Олександр Миколайович Логінов; born 23 July 1991) is a Ukrainian professional footballer who plays as a centre-back.

== Career ==
Lohinov is a product of the various academies in Dnipro.

After playing for Ukrainian clubs in the different levels, in July 2017 he signed a half year contract with Belarusian club Isloch from the Belarusian Premier League.

== Personal life ==
His brother Serhiy Lohinov is also a professional footballer.
