= Artem Kozlov (footballer, born 1992) =

Ukrainian footballer

Personal information
- Full name: Artem Andriyovych Kozlov
- Date of birth: 12 August 1992 (age 34)
- Place of birth: Kremenchuk, Ukraine
- Height: 1.79 m (5 ft 10 1/2 in)
- Position: Midfielder

Youth career
- 2005–2009: Kremin Kremenchuk
- 2007: → FC Vidradnyi Kyiv
- 2008: → Metalurh Zaporizhzhia

Senior career*
Years	Team	Apps	(Gls)
2009–2011	Vorskla Poltava	0	(0)
2012–2014	Zaria Bălți	45	(10)
2012	→ Olimpia-2	2	(0)
2015	Rokyta	2	(0)
2016–2017	Kremin Kremenchuk	31	(22)
2017–2018	Helios Kharkiv	32	(9)
2018–2019	Inhulets Petrove	10	(1)
2019	→ Kremin Kremenchuk (loan)	9	(0)
2019	→ Hirnyk-Sport Horishni Plavni (loan)	11	(1)
2020	Kremin Kremenchuk	9	(0)
2021	Bukovyna Chernivtsi	14	(1)

International career
2010	Ukraine U18	1	(0)
- * Club domestic league appearances and goals as of 25 July 2021

Artem Andriyovych Kozlov (Ukrainian: Артем Андрійович Козлов; born 12 August 1992) is a Ukrainian professional football midfielder.

== Career ==
Kozlov is a product of FC Kremin Kremenchuk youth sportive school and spent time playing for FC Vorskla Poltava in the Ukrainian Premier League Reserves. In March 2012 he signed a contract with FC Olimpia Bălți.

He played for Helios Kharkiv in the Ukrainian First League.
