= Mykola Buy =

Ukrainian footballer

Personal information
- Full name: Mykola Stepanovych Buy
- Date of birth: 22 May 1996 (age 30)
- Place of birth: Hoholiv, Lviv Oblast, Ukraine
- Height: 1.71 m (5 ft 7 1/2 in)
- Position: Midfielder

Team information
- Current team: Epitsentr Dunaivtsi
- Number: 26

Youth career
- 2009–2013: Lviv

Senior career*
Years	Team	Apps	(Gls)
2013	Bohun Brody (amateur)	3	(0)
2014	Sokal-Volkom Sokal (amateur)	10	(2)
2014–2016	Hirnyk Sosnivka (amateur)	50	(19)
2015	→ Shakhtar Chervonohrad (amateur)	3	(0)
2016–2017	Illichivets Mariupol	5	(0)
2016–2017	→ Illichivets-2 Mariupol	18	(4)
2017–2019	Rukh Vynnyky	38	(5)
2019–2020	Ahrobiznes Volochysk	4	(0)
2020–	Epitsentr Dunaivtsi	10	(3)
- * Club domestic league appearances and goals as of 3 March 2021

Mykola Buy (Ukrainian: Микола Степанович Буй; born 22 May 1996) is a professional Ukrainian football midfielder who plays for Epitsentr Dunaivtsi.

== Career ==
Buy is a product of the FC Lviv youth sportive school system.

He played in many different Lviv Oblast amateur teams in his early years, and later signed a contract with the Ukrainian First League club "FC Illichivets" in July 2016.

He made his debut for FC Illichivets in a game against FC Obolon-Brovar Kyiv on 26 August 2016 in the Ukrainian First League.

== Honours ==
=== Individual ===
- Ukrainian Cup Top scorer (shared): 2020–21
