= Stanislav Zakharchenko =

Russian footballer

Personal information
- Full name: Stanislav Igorevich Zakharchenko
- Date of birth: 1 January 1994 (age 32)
- Place of birth: Latonovo, Russia
- Height: 1.78 m (5 ft 10 in)
- Position: Midfielder

Youth career
- FC SKA Rostov-on-Don
- PFC CSKA Moscow

Senior career*
Years	Team	Apps	(Gls)
2011–2014	FC Taganrog	81	(8)
2015–2016	FC Chernomorets Novorossiysk	26	(1)
2016–2017	FC Mordovia Saransk	13	(0)
2017	PFC Spartak Nalchik	1	(0)
2018	FC Luki-Energiya Velikiye Luki	9	(0)
- * Club domestic league appearances and goals

Stanislav Igorevich Zakharchenko (Russian: Станислав Игоревич Захарченко; born 1 January 1994) is a Russian former football midfielder.

== Club career ==
He made his debut in the Russian Second Division for FC Taganrog on 18 September 2011 in a game against FC Rotor Volgograd.

He made his Russian Football National League debut for FC Mordovia Saransk on 31 July 2016 in a game against FC SKA-Khabarovsk.
