= Oleksiy Pinchuk =

Ukrainian footballer (born 1992)

Personal information
- Full name: Oleksiy Vyacheslavovych Pinchuk
- Date of birth: 17 February 1992 (age 34)
- Place of birth: Dnipropetrovsk, Ukraine
- Height: 1.77 m (5 ft 9 1/2 in)
- Position: Defender

Youth career
- 2004–2009: Dnipro Dnipropetrovsk

Senior career*
Years	Team	Apps	(Gls)
2009–2010	Dnipro-75 Dnipropetrovsk	13	(0)
2010–2012	Dnipro-2 Dnipropetrovsk	43	(1)
2012–2014	Stal Dniprodzerzhynsk	57	(2)
2014	Gandzasar Kapan	9	(0)
2015	Stal Dniprodzerzhynsk	11	(0)
2015–2016	Sumy	16	(0)
2016	Veres Rivne	8	(0)
2016	Mykolaiv	4	(0)
2017–2018	Hirnyk-Sport Horishni Plavni	27	(1)
2018	Metalurh Zaporizhya	16	(0)
2019	Hirnyk-Sport Horishni Plavni	12	(0)
2020	Skoruk Tomakivka		
- * Club domestic league appearances and goals as of 13:54, 5 June 2019 (UTC)

Oleksiy Pinchuk (Ukrainian: Олексій В'ячеславович Пінчук; born 17 February 1992 in Dnipropetrovsk, Ukraine) is a Ukrainian former football midfielder.

Pinchuk is a product of the FC Dnipro youth sportive school. His first trainer was Hennadiy Tabala.
