= Roman Stefurak =

Ukrainian footballer

Personal information
- Full name: Roman Romanovych Stefurak
- Date of birth: 17 April 1996 (age 30)
- Place of birth: Tomakivka, Dnipropetrovsk Oblast, Ukraine
- Height: 1.75 m (5 ft 9 in)
- Position: Midfielder

Youth career
- 2009–2013: Metalurh Zaporizhzhia

Senior career*
Years	Team	Apps	(Gls)
2013–2015	Metalurh Zaporizhzhia	4	(0)
2016	Chornomorets Odesa	0	(0)
2016	Avanhard Kramatorsk	8	(1)
2018	Metalurh Zaporizhzhia	1	(0)
2019	Tavriya Simferopol	9	(0)

International career
2013–2014	Ukraine-18	5	(0)
- * Club domestic league appearances and goals as of 16:36, 26 July 2019 (UTC)

Roman Stefurak (Ukrainian: Роман Романович Стефурак; born 17 April 1996 in Tomakivka, Dnipropetrovsk Oblast, Ukraine) is a Ukrainian football midfielder.

== Career ==
Demchenko is a product of FC Metalurh Zaporizhzhia youth team system. He made his debut for Metalurh Zaporizhzhia in the Ukrainian Premier League in a match against FC Shakhtar Donetsk on 28 August 2015. In January 2016 he signed a contract with another Ukrainian Premier League side FC Chornomorets Odesa.
