= Dmytro Skoblov =

Ukrainian footballer

Personal information
- Full name: Dmytro Serhiyovych Skoblov
- Date of birth: 30 November 1989 (age 36)
- Place of birth: Zhdanov, Ukrainian SSR
- Height: 1.78 m (5 ft 10 in)
- Position: Midfielder

Youth career
- 2003–2006: DYFA VAT YMZ Yenakiyeve

Senior career*
Years	Team	Apps	(Gls)
2006–2016	Illichivets Mariupol	21	(0)
2006–2007	→ Illichivets-2 Mariupol	34	(4)
2008	→ Feniks-Illichovets Kalinine (loan)	14	(0)
2012–2014	→ Shakhtar-3 Donetsk (loan)	50	(14)
2016	Bukovyna Chernivtsi	18	(4)
2017	Helios Kharkiv	33	(1)
2018	Volyn Lutsk	7	(0)
2018–2019	Avanhard Kramatorsk	18	(1)
2019	Kremin Kremenchuk	16	(2)
2020	Metalurh Zaporizhya	3	(0)
2020–2021	Mazovia Mińsk Mazowiecki	28	(3)
2022–2023	Cuervos FC Warsaw	21	(20)
2023–2024	City Wilanów	12	(4)
- * Club domestic league appearances and goals as of 27 June 2025

Dmytro Skoblov (Ukrainian: Дмитро Сергійович Скоблов; born 30 November 1989) is a Ukrainian professional footballer who plays as a midfielder.

== Career ==
He made his debut for Illichivets Mariupol as substitution in the second half of a Ukrainian First League match against Krymteplytsia Molodizhne on 3 August 2007.
