= Bohdan Bychkov =

Ukrainian footballer

Personal information
- Full name: Bohdan Serhiyovych Bychkov
- Date of birth: 24 November 1994 (age 31)
- Place of birth: Kirovohrad, Ukraine
- Height: 1.83 m (6 ft 0 in)
- Position: Right-back

Team information
- Current team: Viktoriya Sumy
- Number: 2

Youth career
- 2009: Oleksandriya-Ametyst
- 2009: Ametyst-2001 Oleksandriya
- 2010: Oleksandriya-Ametyst
- 2011: DYuFK Ametyst-2001 Oleksandriya

Senior career*
Years	Team	Apps	(Gls)
2010	Ametyst Oleksandriya	8	(0)
2011	Oleksandriya-Ametyst	9	(0)
2011–2012	Oleksandriya	0	(0)
2012	Oleksandriya-Ametyst		
2013–2016	Oleksandriya	0	(0)
2015	→ Mykolaiv (loan)	11	(1)
2016–2019	Kremin Kremenchuk	76	(1)
2019	Hirnyk-Sport Horishni Plavni	5	(0)
2020–2022	Kremin Kremenchuk	53	(2)
2022–2023	Poltava	22	(0)
2023–	Viktoriya Sumy	8	(0)
- * Club domestic league appearances and goals as of 26 September 2023

Bohdan Serhiyovych Bychkov (Ukrainian: Богдан Сергійович Бичков; born 24 November 1994) is a Ukrainian professional footballer who plays as a right-back for Ukrainian club Viktoriya Sumy.
