= Illya Bryukhov =

Ukrainian footballer

Personal information
- Full name: Illya Pavlovych Bryukhov
- Date of birth: 8 August 1998 (age 28)
- Place of birth: Donetsk, Ukraine
- Position: Defender

Team information
- Current team: Quartu 2000

Youth career
- 2011–2012: Shakhtar Donetsk
- 2012–2014: Olimpik Donetsk
- 2014–2015: Kremin Kremenchuk

Senior career*
Years	Team	Apps	(Gls)
2016–2018	Cagliari	0	(0)
2017–2018	→ Potenza (loan)	0	(0)
2018–2019	Torres	13	(0)
2019–2020	Avanhard Kramatorsk	19	(2)
2020–2021	Kremin Kremenchuk	10	(0)
2021–2022	San Marco Assemini 80		
2022–	Monastir Kosmoto		
- * Club domestic league appearances and goals

Illya Pavlovych Bryukhov (Ukrainian: Ілля Павлович Брюхов; born 8 August 1998) is a Ukrainian footballer who plays for Italian club Quartu 2000.

== Career ==
In 2016, Bryukhov signed for Italian Serie A side Cagliari Calcio.

In 2019, he returned to Ukraine with Avanhard Kramatorsk after playing for S.E.F. Torres 1903 in the Italian fourth division.
