= Maksym Demchuk =

Ukrainian footballer

Personal information
- Full name: Maksym Serhiyovych Demchuk
- Date of birth: 12 October 1998 (age 28)
- Place of birth: Kamianka, Zhytomyr Oblast, Ukraine
- Height: 1.90 m (6 ft 3 in)
- Position: Centre-back

Team information
- Current team: Nyva Ternopil
- Number: 33

Youth career
- 2010: Master-Yunior Kyiv
- 2012–2018: DYuSSh-15 Kyiv

Senior career*
Years	Team	Apps	(Gls)
2018	Chornomorets Odesa	0	(0)
2019–	Nyva Ternopil	109	(4)
- * Club domestic league appearances and goals as of 21 October 2024

Maksym Serhiyovych Demchuk (Ukrainian: Максим Сергійович Демчук; born 12 October 1998) is a Ukrainian professional footballer who plays as a centre-back for Ukrainian club Nyva Ternopil.
