= Yuriy Pavlyk =

Ukrainian footballer

Personal information
- Full name: Yuriy Oleksandrovych Pavlyk
- Date of birth: 15 February 1994 (age 32)
- Place of birth: Kremenchuk, Ukraine
- Height: 1.75 m (5 ft 9 in)
- Position: Midfielder

Team information
- Current team: Olimpiya Savyntsi
- Number: 20

Youth career
- 2007–2011: Kremin Kremenchuk

Senior career*
| Years | Team | Apps | (Gls) |
| 2012–2014 | Vorskla Poltava | 1 | (0) |
| 2015 | Kremin Kremenchuk | 13 | (0) |
| 2016 | Hirnyk Kryvyi Rih | 9 | (0) |
| 2016–2018 | Hirnyk-Sport Horishni Plavni | 61 | (0) |
| 2018 | Kremin Kremenchuk | 17 | (3) |
| 2019 | Radunia Stężyca | 15 | (0) |
| 2019 | Kremin Kremenchuk | 19 | (3) |
| 2020–2022 | Banga Gargždai | 31 | (0) |
| 2022 | Tavriya Simferopol | 0 | (0) |
| 2023– | Olimpiya Savyntsi | | |
- * Club domestic league appearances and goals as of 7 June 2023

Yuriy Pavlyk (Ukrainian: Юрій Олександрович Павлик; born 15 February 1994) is a Ukrainian professional footballer who plays as a midfielder for Olimpiya Savyntsi.

== Career ==
Pavlyk is the product of the Youth Sportive School FC Kremin Youth System. He signed his first contract with Vorskla Poltava in July 2012.

Pavlyk's professional career continued, when he was promoted to the Vorksla's main squad, and on 24 April 2014 he made his Ukrainian Premier League debut against Illichivets Mariupol.
