= Yehor Chehurko =

Ukrainian footballer

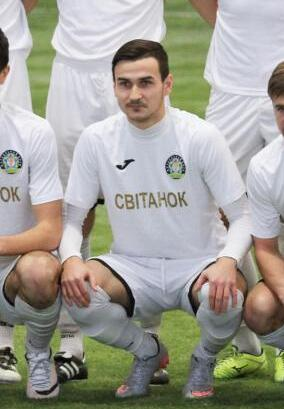

Personal information
- Full name: Yehor Volodymyrovych Chehurko
- Date of birth: 27 January 1995 (age 31)
- Place of birth: Horlivka, Ukraine
- Height: 1.75 m (5 ft 9 in)
- Position: Striker

Team information
- Current team: Kolos Velyki Sorochyntsi

Youth career
- 2010–2011: DYuFA VAT YeMZ Yenakiieve
- 2012: Metalist Kharkiv

Senior career*
Years	Team	Apps	(Gls)
2012–2016	Metalist Kharkiv	4	(0)
2016–2017	Kolos Kovalivka	21	(1)
2017	→ Metalist 1925 Kharkiv (loan)	19	(8)
2018	Dnipro-1	7	(0)
2018–2019	Metalist 1925 Kharkiv	17	(0)
2019	Kolos Velyki Sorochyntsi	11	(7)
2020–2021	Naftovyk Okhtyrka	5	(3)
2021	Zolochiv	11	(15)
2022–	Kolos Velyki Sorochyntsi	13	(14)
- * Club domestic league appearances and goals as of 31 December 2022

Yehor Volodymyrovych Chehurko (Ukrainian: Єгор Володимирович Чегурко; born 27 January 1995) is a Ukrainian amateur footballer who plays as a striker for Kolos Velyki Sorochyntsi.

== Career ==
Chehurko is a product of the Yenakiyeve and Metalist Kharkiv academies.

He made his debut for FC Metalist in the match against FC Dynamo Kyiv on 1 March 2015 in the Ukrainian Premier League.
