= Yuriy Brovchenko =

Ukrainian professional footballer

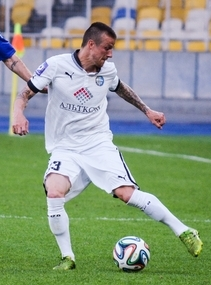
- Brovchenko playing for Olimpik Donetsk in 2015

Personal information
- Full name: Yuriy Anatoliyovych Brovchenko
- Date of birth: 25 January 1988 (age 38)
- Place of birth: Chernihiv, Ukrainian SSR, Soviet Union
- Height: 1.72 m (5 ft 7 1/2 in)
- Position: Midfielder

Youth career
- 2004: Dynamo Kyiv

Senior career*
Years	Team	Apps	(Gls)
2005–2007	Dnipro Dnipropetrovsk	0	(0)
2008–2009	Dinamo Minsk	15	(0)
2008	→ Savit Mogilev (loan)	13	(0)
2010	Prykarpattya Ivano-Frankivsk	12	(4)
2011	Krymteplytsia Molodizhne	12	(0)
2012	Bukovyna Chernivtsi	25	(3)
2013	Oleksandriya	13	(0)
2014	Obolon-Brovar Kyiv	27	(2)
2015	Olimpik Donetsk	4	(0)
2015–2017	Obolon-Brovar Kyiv	52	(3)
2017–2019	Dnipro-1	40	(1)
2019–2021	Obolon Kyiv	35	(3)
2021	→ Obolon-2 Bucha	6	(0)
2021	Viktoriya Mykolaivka	15	(0)
2022–2023	HFK Třebíč		
2023–	TJ Moravan Lednice		
- * Club domestic league appearances and goals as of 31 December 2021

Yuriy Brovchenko (Ukrainian: Юрій Анатолійович Бровченко; born 25 January 1988) is a Ukrainian professional footballer who plays for TJ Moravan Lednice.
