= Yehor Demchenko =

Ukrainian footballer

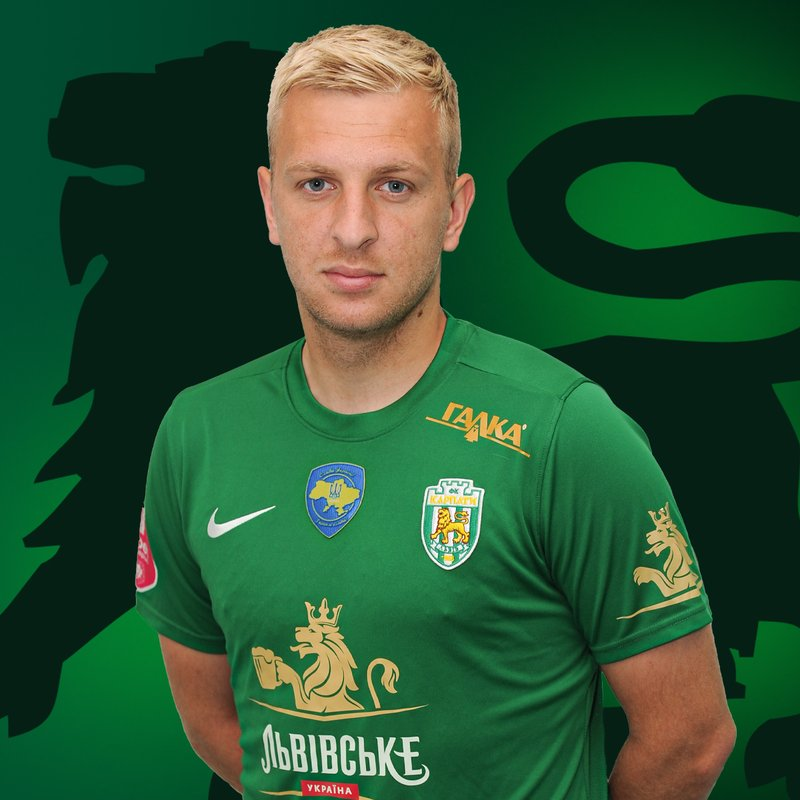

Personal information
- Full name: Yehor Vasylyovych Demchenko
- Date of birth: 25 July 1997 (age 29)
- Place of birth: Stepnohirsk, Ukraine
- Height: 1.78 m (5 ft 10 in)
- Position: Midfielder

Team information
- Current team: Epitsentr Kamianets-Podilskyi
- Number: 17

Youth career
- 2010–2014: Metalurh Zaporizhzhia

Senior career*
Years	Team	Apps	(Gls)
2014–2015	Metalurh Zaporizhzhia	6	(0)
2016	Zorya Luhansk	0	(0)
2016	Bukovyna Chernivtsi	8	(1)
2016	Olimpik Donetsk	0	(0)
2017–2020	Avanhard Kramatorsk	75	(19)
2019	→ Kolos Kovalivka (loan)	2	(0)
2020–2023	Metalist Kharkiv	62	(11)
2023–2024	Karpaty Lviv	24	(2)
2024	Mariupol	6	(2)
2025–26	Epitsentr Kamianets-Podilskyi	24	(2)
2026	Feniks-Mariupol	1	(0)
2026-	FC Prykarpattia Ivano-Frankivsk (1998)	8	(1)
- * Club domestic league appearances and goals as of 2 November 2026 @ 13:32(AEST)

Yehor Vasylyovych Demchenko (Ukrainian: Єгор Васильович Демченко; born 25 July 1997) is a Ukrainian professional footballer who plays as a midfielder for Epitsentr Kamianets-Podilskyi.

== Career ==
Demchenko is a product of FC Metalurh Zaporizhzhia youth team system. His first trainer was Mykola Syenovalov.

He made his debut for Metalurh Zaporizhzhia in the Ukrainian Premier League in a match against FC Hoverla Uzhhorod on 8 August 2015.

In August 2016, he spent 2 weeks training with Japanese club Júbilo Iwata, but he wasn't signed. After his return from Japan, he trained with Olimpik Donetsk and signed contract with the club on 1 December 2016.
