= Serhiy Herasymets =

Ukrainian footballer (born 1988)

Personal information
- Full name: Serhiy Serhiyovych Herasymets
- Date of birth: 20 August 1988 (age 38)
- Place of birth: Donetsk, Ukrainian SSR
- Height: 1.84 m (6 ft 1/2 in)
- Position: Striker

Team information
- Current team: Tygrys Huta Mińska
- Number: 20

Youth career
- 2001–2002: Lokomotyv Kyiv
- 2002–2003: Dynamo Kyiv
- 2005–2006: BVUFK Brovary

Senior career*
Years	Team	Apps	(Gls)
2006–2007	Inter Boyarka	27	(4)
2007–2008	Knyazha Schaslyve	13	(1)
2008	Knyazha-2 Schaslyve	13	(1)
2009	Nafkom Brovary	10	(2)
2009–2011	Nyva Vinnytsia	71	(18)
2012–2014	Helios Kharkiv	64	(17)
2014–2016	Hirnyk-Sport Komsomolsk	69	(21)
2016–2017	Veres Rivne	33	(4)
2017–2018	Mykolaiv	32	(6)
2018–2019	Balkany Zorya	14	(3)
2019–2020	Hirnyk-Sport Horishni Plavni	27	(4)
2021–	Tygrys Huta Mińska	159	(99)
- * Club domestic league appearances and goals as of 16:41, 30 June 2026 (UTC)

Serhiy Herasymets (Ukrainian: Сергій Сергійович Герасимець; born 20 August 1988) is a Ukrainian professional footballer who plays as a striker for Polish V liga Masovia club Tygrys Huta Mińska.

== Career ==
Herasymets is the product of the FC Lokomotyv Kyiv and FC Dynamo Kyiv Sportive School Systems. His father is retired Belarusian footballer and current coach Syarhyey Hyerasimets Sr.

== Honours ==
Tygrys Huta Mińska

- V liga Masovia II: 2023–24
- Polish Cup (Siedlce regionals): 2022–23
