= Anton Kicha =

Ukrainian footballer

Personal information
- Full name: Anton Vladyslavovych Kicha
- Date of birth: 1 May 1990 (age 36)
- Place of birth: Dnipropetrovsk, Ukrainian SSR
- Height: 1.73 m (5 ft 8 in)
- Position: Midfielder

Team information
- Current team: Metalurh Zaporizhzhia
- Number: 90

Youth career
- 1998–2003: Youth Sportive School #12 Dnipropetrovsk
- 2003–2007: UFK Dnipropetrovsk

Senior career*
Years	Team	Apps	(Gls)
2007	FC Lokomotyv-Veteran Dnipropetrovsk	3	(0)
2008–2009	Dnipro-75 Dnipropetrovsk	45	(1)
2010–2013	Illichivets Mariupol	3	(0)
2012–2013	→ Oleksandriya (loan)	32	(4)
2013–2014	Oleksandriya	31	(0)
2015	Chornomorets Odesa	3	(0)
2015–2018	Helios Kharkiv	83	(5)
2018–2019	Hirnyk-Sport Horishni Plavni	22	(1)
2019–2020	Mynai	12	(1)
2020–2021	VPK-Ahro Shevchenkivka	18	(1)
2021–2022	Peremoha Dnipro	18	(12)
2022–	Metalurh Zaporizhzhia	9	(1)
- * Club domestic league appearances and goals as of 8 November 2022

Anton Kicha (Ukrainian: Антон Владиславович Кіча; born 1 May 1990) is a Ukrainian professional footballer who plays as a midfielder for Metalurh Zaporizhzhia.

== Career ==
Kicha is a product of two Dnipropetrovsk youth sportive schools. His first trainer was Anatoliy Zyuz.

He made his debut in the Ukrainian Premier League entering as the second-time substitute for FC Illichivets Mariupol in the game against FC Vorskla Poltava on 17 July 2010.
