= FC Kryvbas Kryvyi Rih =

Ukrainian association football club

Kryvbas Kryvyi Rih
- Full name: Football Club Kryvbas Kryvyi Rih
- Founded: 1959 (original club); 2020 (current club)
- Ground: Hirnyk Stadium (temporarily), Metalurh Stadium (nominally; on reconstruction)
- Capacity: 30,000 (Metalurh); 2,500 (Hirnyk)
- President: Kostiantyn Karamanits
- General Director: Volodymyr Bayenko
- Head coach: Oleksandr Petrakov
- League: Ukrainian Premier League
- 2025–26: Ukrainian Premier League, 7th of 16
- Website: fckryvbas.com
Home colours	Away colours	Third colours

FC Kryvbas Kryvyi Rih (Ukrainian: Футбольний Клуб Кривбас Кривий Ріг) is a Ukrainian professional football club based in Kryvyi Rih.

Until 2013 the club participated in professional competitions. In June 2013, the club went bankrupt and was expelled from the Ukrainian Premier League. There was a failed attempt to revive the club in 2014, until finally the club was reestablished again in 2015. In 2020, with the efforts of the Kvartal 95 Studio staff members and the Ze! team, it was restructured as Football Club Kryvbas Kryvyi Rih based on Hirnyk Kryvyi Rih (another club), which took on the Football Club Kryvbas's brand. The president of the former Hirnyk, Kostiantyn Karamanits, became the president of the revived Kryvbas.

Many people consider the original Football Club Kryvbas Kryvyi Rih (founded in 1959) and the Football Club Kryvbas Kryvyi Rih of 2020 as the same club.

== History ==
The club was founded as a "team of masters" of Kryvyi Rih city in 1959. The club was claiming its heritage to the football team of Felix Dzerzhynskiy Quarry (Ukrainian: команда рудника імені Дзержинського) that competed at the republican level in 1956 and 1957. In 1960, the team of masters of Kryvyi Rih city was admitted to the republican sport society Avanhard and adopted the name of the society, Avanhard Kryvyi Rih. After a couple of years it changed to Hirnyk Kryvyi Rih, before obtaining current its name in 1966. Over the years in the Soviet competitions Kryvbas became a record holder for Ukrainian championship wins tying it at four along with SKA Kiev.

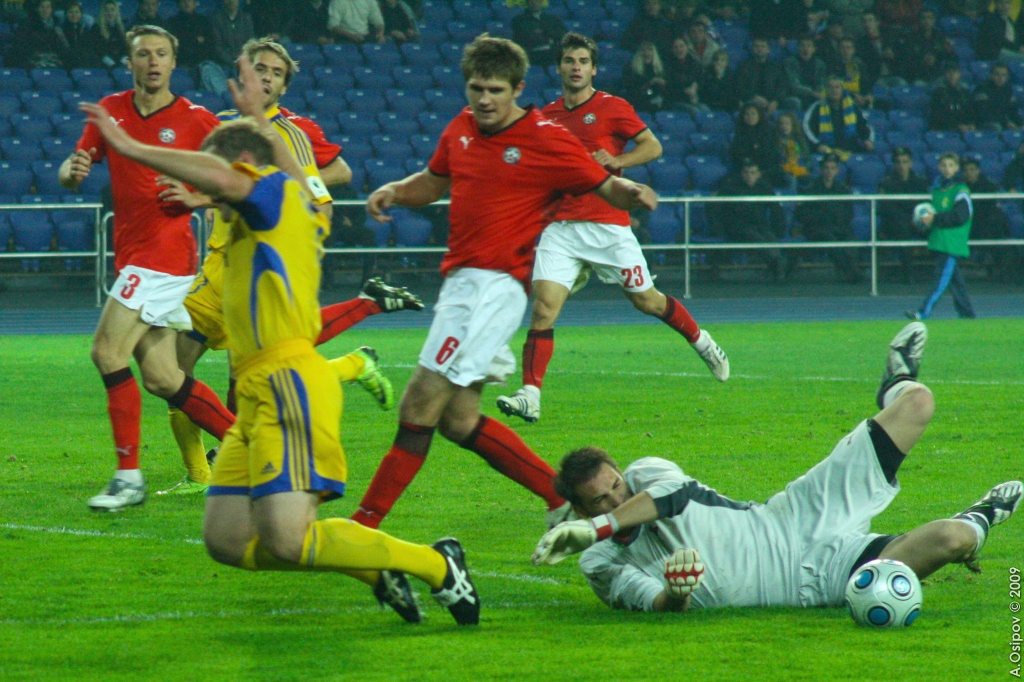
Kryvbas against Metalist Kharkiv in 2008

Kryvbas debuted in the Ukrainian Premier League in the 1992–1993 season. They have been in the top league since their debut in the second season. Their best finish was in third place in the 1998–99 and 1999–2000 seasons which made them the only club out of a provincial city that managed to place among the top three best.

At the end of the UPL 2012–2013 season the team finished in 7th place, however, due to financial difficulties the club declared itself bankrupt in June 2013.

In 2013-14 local authorities created the Sport Club Kryvbas that included teams of several sports including football. FC Kryvbas played several friendlies in the spring of 2014. Due to the 2014 pro-Russian unrest in Ukraine, the project was suspended for undefined period. In the summer of 2015 there was created a public organization "Kryvbas maye buty" (Kryvbas has to be) that is involved in a revival of sportive symbol of the city.

In August 2015 FC Kryvbas was allowed to start at the mid-season of the Dnipropetrovsk Oblast Championship where it played 11 games winning four and losing five. At finish, the club ended up at the 10th place among 13 participants. In November 2015 it also was applying for the 2016–17 Ukrainian Second League. In 2016 FC Kryvbas started out in the 2016 Ukrainian Football Amateur League. The new club will start out at the Spartak Stadium that was renovated back in 2013 and holds approximately 4,000 seats.

=== Hirnyk Kryvyi Rih ===
After a year of absence, in 2017 Hirnyk Kryvyi Rih was reestablished and entered the Ukrainian Amateur competition following which it regained professional status for the 2018–19 season.

=== Kryvbas Kryvyi Rih ===
On 29 July 2020 the president of Hirnyk Kostiantyn Karamanits confirmed that his team would be renamed into Kryvbas before the start of the 2020–21 Ukrainian Second League season. Later it changed to Kryvbas Kryvyi Rih. The club's rebranding was triggered on petition of Ukrainian president Volodymyr Zelenskyy. It is the second time the club was renamed as Kryvbas, previously also were known as Kryvbas-Ruda.

In interview to Artur Valerko in July 2013 right after the original Kryvbas was declared bankrupt, the football historian Vasyl Hnatiuk has foreseen the transition of Hirnyk to Kryvbas. On 20 August 2020 there took place official presentation of the new Kryvbas. At the presentation the Verkhovna Rada People's Deputy of Ukraine Yurii Koriavchenkov explained that the process started back in 2015 when on efforts of fans there was created a public organization "Kryvbas maie buty" (Kryvbas has to be) and Serhiy Mazur asked us at that time members of studio "Kvartal-95" with request to help with revival of Kryvbas. The club's president remained the president of former Hirnyk Kostiantyn Karamanits, vice-president on development of youth football became Serhiy Mazur, vice-president on fans cooperation Vadym Ivashchenko, vice-president of communication and public relations Artem Mykhailichenko, head of board of trustees became Yurii Koriavchenkov. It was also announced the history of Hirnyk did not end and its club's academy will continue to work under the brand of Hirnyk and develop young talents for the main squad of the revived Kryvbas.

The new Kryvbas played its first game against FC Cherkashchyna as part of the 2020–21 Ukrainian Cup and won it 4:2. The game had several spectators and was visited by the President of Ukraine Volodymyr Zelenskyy. During the game some fans spread a banner with a saying "Zelensky three, two, one, shames our Kryvbas".

=== Presidents and chairmen ===
- 2013 – Oleksandr Livshyts
- 2015 – Taras Stretovych

== Stadiums and training facilities ==
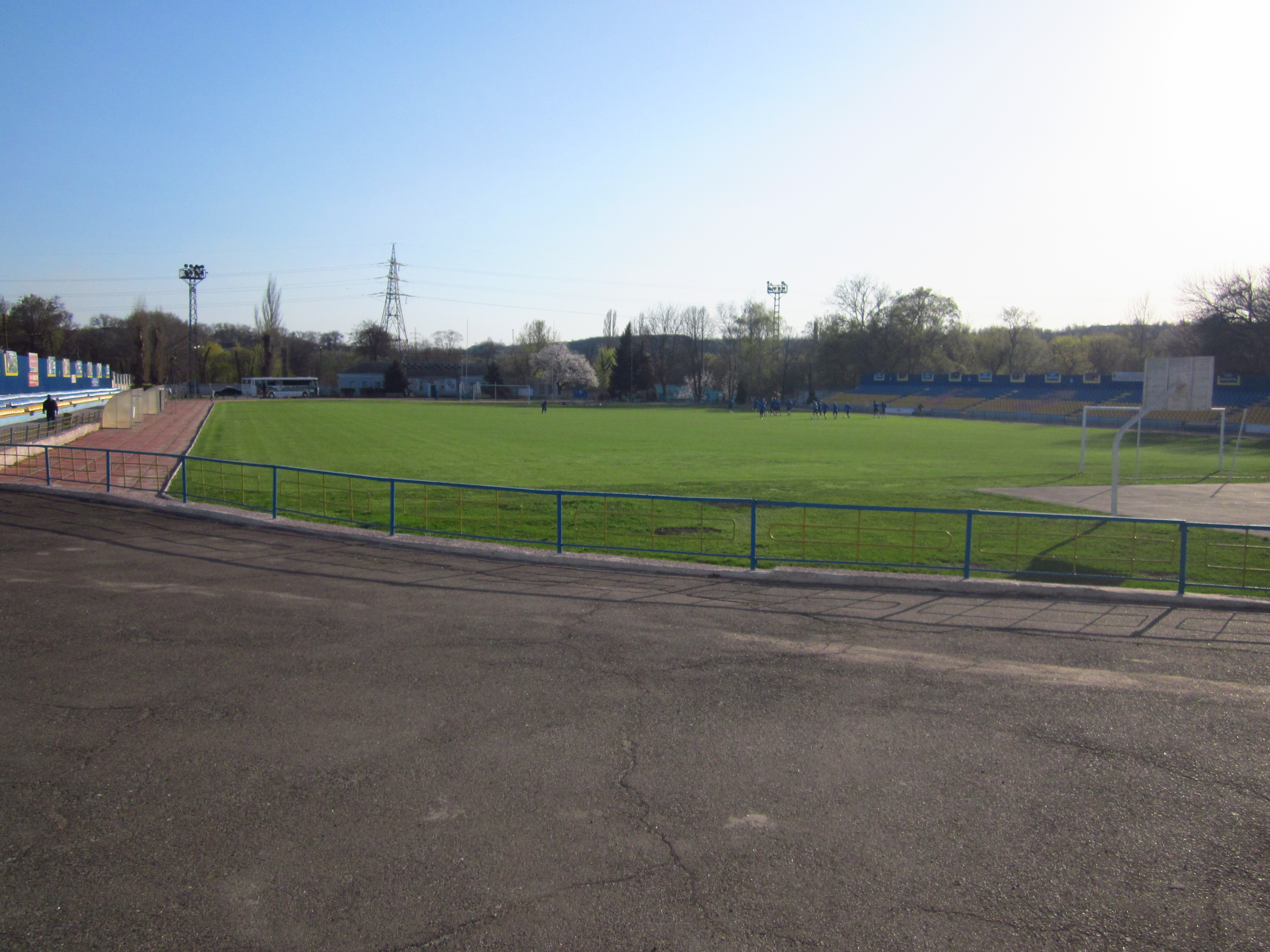
Hirnyk Stadium (former October Mine Stadium)

The club's main stadium is Hirnyk, formerly Zhovtneva Mine Stadium. It is located at Kolonkovska street. The stadium has capacity of 2,500 seats and its field consists of natural grass and has size 105х67 meters. Besides its main field, the club has also a training complex. The club's training complex is based around former Rodina Mine Stadium located at Svitlohorska street.

=== Youth football school Hirnyk ===
The club's school was founded on 1 June 2003. The school provides its pupils aged 3 to 17 with extracurriculum activities in football.

== Honours ==
- Championship of the Ukrainian SSR
  - Winners (4): 1971, 1975, 1976, 1981
- Ukrainian First League
  - Winners (1): 1992
- Ukrainian Cup
  - Runners-up: 2000

=== Football kits and sponsors ===
Years	Football kit	Shirt sponsor
1998–1999	adidas	–
1999–2002	puma	–
2002–2003	puma/lotto	–
2003–2005	lotto	Криворіжсталь
2005–2006	adidas	–
2006–2007	adidas/lotto	–
2007–2008	puma/lotto	–
2008–2011	puma	–
2011–2013	nike	–
2021–present	strochka/skidan	Рудомайн

== League and Cup history ==
=== Soviet Union ===
Season	Div.	Pos.	Pl.	W	D	L	GS	GA	P	Domestic Cup	Europe	Notes
1986	3rd (VI Zone)	6	40	16	13	11	58	48	45			
1987	3rd (VI Zone)	11	52	23	10	19	68	68	56			
1988	3rd (VI Zone)	6	50	21	14	15	53	45	56			
1989	3rd (VI Zone)	10	52	23	10	19	78	70	56			10th place or lower got demoted
1990	4th (I Zone)	15	36	10	6	20	40	53	26			
1991	4th (I Zone)	11	52	19	13	20	75	64	51			

=== Ukraine ===
Season	Div.	Pos.	Pl.	W	D	L	GS	GA	P	Domestic Cup	Europe		Notes
as FC Kryvbas Kryvyi Rih Founded 1959
1992	2nd"B"(Persha Liha)	1	26	15	10	1	46	23	40	1/8 finals			Promoted
1992–93	1st(Vyshcha Liha)	8	30	8	11	11	27	40	27	1/16 finals			
1993–94	1st(Vyshcha Liha)	6	34	14	8	12	26	26	36				
1994–95	1st(Vyshcha Liha)	6	34	13	9	12	35	30	48	1/8 finals			
1995–96	1st(Vyshcha Liha)	14	34	11	9	14	43	52	42	1/16 finals			
1996–97	1st(Vyshcha Liha)	12	30	9	6	15	24	48	33	1/16 finals			
1997–98	1st(Vyshcha Liha)	8	30	10	9	11	34	33	39	1/2 finals			
1998–99	1st(Vyshcha Liha)	3	30	16	11	3	43	18	59	1/4 finals			
1999–00	1st(Vyshcha Liha)	3	30	18	6	6	26	52	60	Runner-up	UEFA Cup	1st round	
2000–01	1st(Vyshcha Liha)	11	26	6	6	14	22	36	24	1/4 finals	UEFA Cup	1st round	
2001–02	1st(Vyshcha Liha)	9	26	6	10	10	28	40	28	1/8 finals			
2002–03	1st(Vyshcha Liha)	12	30	8	7	15	25	37	31	1/4 finals			
2003–04	1st(Vyshcha Liha)	10	30	10	6	14	26	41	36	1/8 finals			
2004–05	1st(Vyshcha Liha)	13	30	7	10	13	24	38	31	1/2 finals			
2005–06	1st(Vyshcha Liha)	14	30	9	6	15	27	35	33	1/4 finals			
2006–07	1st(Vyshcha Liha)	10	30	7	14	9	29	36	35	1/8 finals			
2007–08	1st(Vyshcha Liha)	13	30	7	9	14	29	39	30	1/8 finals			
2008–09	1st(Premier Liha)	12	30	8	8	14	21	36	32	1/16 finals			
2009–10	1st(Premier Liha)	14	30	7	4	19	31	47	25	1/8 finals			
2010–11	1st(Premier Liha)	13	30	6	11	13	27	45	29	1/16 finals			
2011–12	1st(Premier Liha)	10	30	9	6	15	22	38	33	1/8 finals			
2012–13	1st(Premier Liha)	7	30	12	7	11	36	41	43	1/16 finals			Expelled
2016	4th	4/4	6	0	1	5	2	19	1				
FC Hirnyk Kryvyi Rih has reestablished
2017–18	4th Gr"3" (Amateur League)	5	16	6	2	8	44	35	20	-	-	-	Applied (Note: applied to the Second League)
2018–19	3rd Gr"B" (Second League)	3	27	15	6	6	53	33	51	1/8 finals	-	-	-
2019–20	3rd Gr"B" (Second League)	4	20	10	3	7	33	22	33	1/64 finals	-	-	-
Restructured as FC Kryvbas Kryvyi Rih Founded 2020 based on FC Hirnyk Kryvyi Rih
2020–21	3rd Gr"B" (Second League)	2	21	14	5	2	50	14	47	1/16 finals	-	-	Promoted
2021–22 was terminated	2nd (First League)	2	20/30	12	6	2	38	17	42	1/64 finals	-	began on 24.02.2022 Russian invasion of Ukraine	Promoted
2022–23	1st (Premier League)	7	30	12	5	13	26	30	41	Not played	-	-	-
2023–24	1st (Premier League)	3	30	17	6	7	51	30	57	1/16 finals	-	-	-
2024–25	1st (Premier League)	5	30	13	8	9	34	26	47	1/8 finals	UEFA Europa League	Third qualifying round	Transfer from UEL to UEFA Europa Conference League - Play-off round
2025–26	1st (Premier League)	7	30	13	9	8	53	46	48	1/16 finals	-	-	-
2026–27	1st (Premier League)	10	5	1	2	2	7	9	5	1/4 finals	-	-	TBD

== European record ==
Football Club Kryvbas Kryvyi Rih (1959-2013) made its debut in European tournaments at the 1999–2000 UEFA Cup, being eliminated by Parma F.C. in the first round (second round for Kryvbas). Kryvbas also became the first club in the history of Ukrainian football representing other than a regional administrative center.

=== Overall record ===
Accurate as of 01 January 2026

Competition	Played	Won	Drew	Lost	GF	GA	GD	Win%
UEFA Cup / UEFA Europa League	8	2	0	6	8	15	−7	25.00
UEFA Europa Conference League / UEFA Conference League	2	0	0	2	0	5	−5	0.00
Total	10	2	0	8	8	20	−12	20.00

=== UEFA ranking ===
UEFA coefficient ranking as of 24 August 2025:

Rank	Team	Coefficient
317	(Ukraine) FC Kryvbas Kryvyi Rih	3.970

- Full list

=== Results ===
Season	Competition	Round	Club	Home/Neitral	Away	Aggregate
as FC Kryvbas Kryvyi Rih Founded 1959
1999–2000	UEFA Cup	Qualifying round	(Azerbaijan) Shamkir	3–0	2–0	5–0
1999–2000	UEFA Cup	First round	(Italy) Parma	0–3	2–3	2–6
2000–01	UEFA Cup	First round	(France) Nantes	0–1	0–5	0–6
Restructured as FC Kryvbas Kryvyi Rih Founded 2020 based on FC Hirnyk Kryvyi Rih
2024–25	UEFA Europa League	Third qualifying round	(Czech Republic) Viktoria Plzeň	1–2 Ks	0–1	1–3
2024–25	UEFA Conference League (Transfer from UEL)	Play-off round	(Spain) Real Betis	0–2 Ks	0–3	0–5

Note: Ks - Košice, Slovakia

== Players ==
=== Current squad ===
As of 7 September 2026

Note: Flags indicate national team as defined under FIFA eligibility rules; some limited exceptions apply. Players may hold more than one non-FIFA nationality.

No.	Pos.	Nation	Player
1	GK	UKR	Bohdan Khoma
3	DF	POR	Jimmy Mpanzu
4	DF	UKR	Volodymyr Vilivald
5	DF	UKR	Vyacheslav Kulbachuk (on loan from Debrecen)
6	MF	UKR	Denys Pidhurskyi
7	FW	VEN	Yackson Rivas (on loan from Deportivo La Guaira)
8	MF	UKR	Yaroslav Shevchenko
9	FW	JAM	Shakeone Satchwell
10	FW	PAN	Giovany Herbert (on loan from Árabe Unido)
11	FW	TAN	Cyprian Kachwele
12	GK	UKR	Oleksandr Kemkin
14	MF	SEN	Assane Seck

No.	Pos.	Nation	Player
15	DF	PAN	Joseph Jones
16	DF	BRA	Thiago Borges
17	MF	ISR	Roy Nawi (on loan from Maccabi Tel Aviv)
18	MF	ISR	Bar Lin
20	FW	UKR	Matviy Bodnar
21	MF	UKR	Oleksandr Kamenskyi
22	DF	POR	João Machado
24	FW	UKR	Volodymyr Mulyk
25	FW	UKR	Tymur Butenko
27	MF	UKR	Dmytro Hodya
28	MF	BOL	Santiago Cuiza (on loan from Real Tomayapo)

=== Out on loan ===
Note: Flags indicate national team as defined under FIFA eligibility rules; some limited exceptions apply. Players may hold more than one non-FIFA nationality.

No.	Pos.	Nation	Player

== Managers ==
=== First team ===
- (Ukraine) Myron Markevych (Jan 1996 – June 1996)
- (Ukraine) Oleh Taran (July 1997 – Sept 2000)
- (Ukraine) Hennadiy Lytovchenko (Sept 2000 – Dec 2001)
- (Ukraine) Ihor Nadein (Jan 2002 – Aug 2002)
- (Ukraine) Oleksandr Ishchenko (Aug 2002 – June 203)
- (Ukraine) Volodymyr Muntyan (July 2003 – Dec 2003)
- (Ukraine) Oleksandr Kosevych (Jan 2004 – Feb 2007)
- (Ukraine) Oleh Taran (Feb 2007 – Dec 2009)
- (Ukraine) Yuriy Maksymov (Jan 2010 – June 2012)
- (Ukraine) Vitaliy Kvartsyanyi (June 2012 – July 2012)
- (Ukraine) Oleh Taran (July 2012 – May 2013)

=== Reserve team ===
- (Ukraine) Volodymyr Sharan (2004–2005)
- (Ukraine) Andriy Kuptsov (2005–2007)
- (Ukraine) Serhiy Mazur (2009–2012)

== Head coaches ==
- 2020–2021: (Ukraine) Hennadiy Prykhodko (head coach of the former FC Hirnyk Kryvyi Rih)
- 2021–2022: (Ukraine) Oleksandr Babych
- 2022–2025: (Ukraine) Yuriy Vernydub
- 2025–2026: (Netherlands) Patrick van Leeuwen
- 2026- : (Ukraine) Oleksandr Petrakov

== Coaches and administration ==
Administration	Coaching (senior team)	Coaching (U-19 team)
President – (Ukraine) Kostyantyn Karamanits; Vice-president – (Ukraine) Volodymyr Kolos; Vice-president – vacant; Vice-president – (Ukraine) Serhiy Mazur; General director – (Ukraine) Volodymyr Bayenko; Presidential advisor – (Ukraine) Hennadiy Prykhodko	Head coach – (Ukraine) Oleksandr Petrakov; Assistant coach - (Ukraine) Serhiy Popov; Assistant coach - (Ukraine) Roman Debelko; Goalkeeping coach – (Ukraine) Oleksandr Kupalnyi; Assistant fitness coach – (Ukraine) Vyacheslav Ryabov; Assistant fitness coach – (Ukraine) Andriy Bulychev	Caretaker head coach – (Ukraine) Yuriy Shturko; Assistant coach –; Goalkeeping coach – (Uzbekistan) Sergey Smorodin; Fitness coach – (Ukraine) Pavlo Bovtunenko

== See also ==
- FC Kryvbas Kryvyi Rih Reserves and Youth Team
- FC Kryvbas Kryvyi Rih (women)
