= 2019–20 Ukrainian Cup =

Tournament details
- Country: Ukraine
- Dates: 20 August 2019–8 July 2020; 20 August 2019–27 August 2019 (preliminary rounds); 25 September 2019–8 July 2020 (main event)
- Teams: 49

Final positions
- Champions: Dynamo Kyiv (12th title)
- Runners-up: Vorskla Poltava
- Semifinalists: FC Mynai; FC Mariupol
- UEFA Europa League: none (Note: The winner Dynamo Kyiv qualified for the UEFA Champions League)

Tournament statistics
- Matches played: 47
- Goals scored: 121 (2.57 per match)
- Attendance: 106,969 (2,276 per match)
- Top goal scorer: 4 – Vladyslav Sharay (Alians)
- All statistics correct as of 9 July 2020.

The 2019–20 Ukrainian Cup was the 29th annual season of Ukraine's football knockout competition. The competition started on 20 August 2019 and concluded on 8 July 2020 with the final at the OSC Metalist in Kharkiv.

All competition rounds consisted of a single game with a home field advantage granted to a team from lower league. Qualification for the competition is granted to all professional clubs and finalists of the Ukrainian Amateur Cup as long as those clubs are able to pass the season's attestation (licensing).

Shakhtar Donetsk was the defending winner for the last two seasons, but was eliminated by Dynamo Kyiv in the round of 16. The Donetsk club has reached the competition finals in the last nine years winning seven of them.

Dynamo Kyiv won their 12th Ukrainian Cup title after beating Vorskla Poltava 8–7 on penalties in the final with the game ending in the 1–1 draw. They therefore qualified to the group stage of the 2020–21 UEFA Europa League, however they can still qualify for the Champions League through league season.

Some changes were introduced. Unlike the last season starting with the third round of the competition there was a seeded draw, while for the first two rounds the draw remained blind. This was the first Ukrainian Cup season to implement the Video assistant referee (VAR) system on some matches, the first game to use VAR was the quarter-final match between Dynamo Kyiv and Oleksandriya.

On 17 March 2020, the Ukrainian Association of Football made a decision to pause all football competitions in the country on 18 March 2020 for an unspecified period of time (until the decision to resume competitions) due to the COVID-19 pandemic in Ukraine, which caused a postponement of the semi-final and final matches to another date.

== Team allocation and schedule ==
The competition included all professional first teams from the Premier League (12/12 teams of the league), First League (16/16), Second League (18/22) and two best teams from the previous year's Amateur Cup. Four second club teams from the Second League are not eligible for the tournament.

One more team, Arsenal Kyiv, withdrew right after approval of the tournament structure, but before the draw of the second preliminary round, to which it qualified as a member of the First League.

Distribution
First preliminary round (20 teams)	18 entrants from the Second League 2 entrants from the Amateur Cup	
Second preliminary round (25 teams)	15 entrants from the First League^{(4)}	10 winners from the First round
Round of 32 (20 teams)	6 entrants from the Premier League; 1 entrant from the First League	13 winners from the Second round (including 1 team that received bye)
Round of 16 (16 teams)	6 entrants from the Premier League	10 winners from the third round

=== Rounds schedule ===
Phase	Round	Fractional	Draw date	Game date
Preliminary	Round 1	1/64 finals	14 August 2019	20 August 2019
Preliminary	Round 2	1/32 finals	21 August 2019	27 August 2019
Main event	Round of 32	1/16 finals	28 August 2019	25 September 2019
Main event	Round of 16	1/8 finals	3 October 2019	30 October 2019
Main event	Quarter-finals	1/4 finals	18 December 2019	11–12 March 2020
Main event	Semi-finals	1/2 finals	13 March 2020	17–24 June 2020 (originally scheduled for 15 April 2020)
Main event	Final		8 July 2020 (originally scheduled for 13 May 2020)	

Notes:

All draws were held at the Ukrainian Association of Football House of Football.

=== Teams ===
Enter in First Round		Enter in Second Round	Enter in Round of 32		Enter in Round of 16
AAFU; 2/2 teams	PFL League 2; 18/22 teams	PFL League 1; 15/16 teams	PFL League1; 1/16 teams	UPL; 6/12 teams	UPL; 6/12 teams
Avanhard Bziv; FC Vovchansk	Alians Lypova Dolyna*; Bukovyna Chernivtsi; Chaika Petropavlivska Borshchahivka; Dinaz Vyshhorod*; Enerhiya Nova Kakhovka; Hirnyk Kryvyi Rih; FC Kalush; Krystal Kherson; FC Nikopol; Nyva Ternopil; Nyva Vinnytsia; Podillya Khmelnytskyi; Polissya Zhytomyr; Real Pharma Odesa; Tavriya Simferopol; FC Uzhhorod*; Veres Rivne; VPK-Ahro Shevchenkivka*	Ahrobiznes Volochysk; Avanhard Kramatorsk; Balkany Zorya; Cherkashchyna Cherkasy; Hirnyk-Sport; Inhulets Petrove; Kremin Kremenchuk; Metalist 1925 Kharkiv; Metalurh Zaporizhia; MFC Mykolaiv; FC Mynai; Obolon-Brovar Kyiv; Prykarpattia Ivano-Frankivsk; Rukh Lviv; Volyn Lutsk	Chornomorets Odesa	SC Dnipro-1; Karpaty Lviv; FC Lviv; FC Mariupol; FC Oleksandriya; Olimpik Donetsk	Desna Chernihiv; Dynamo Kyiv; Kolos Kovalivka; Shakhtar Donetsk; Vorskla Poltava; Zorya Luhansk

Notes:

- With the asterisk (*) are noted the Second League teams that were recently admitted to the league from amateurs and the AAFU (amateur) team(s) that qualified in place of the Amateur Cup finalist(s).
- Four of the Second League second teams (reserves) were not drawn for the competition: Chornomorets-2, Obolon-2, Mykolaiv-2, Avanhard-2.

== Bracket ==
The following is the bracket which the main stage of the Ukrainian Cup resembles. Numbers in parentheses next to the match score represent the results of a penalty shoot-out.

Round of 32; 25 September - 2 October
25 September 2019
FC Mynai	1
Volyn Lutsk	0
25 September 2019
Bukovyna Chernivtsi	0
FC Lviv	2
25 September 2019
Ahrobiznes Volochysk	1
SC Dnipro-1	3
25 September 2019
Inhulets Petrove (p)	0 (7)
Karpaty Lviv	0 (6)
25 September 2019
Dinaz Vyshhorod (a.e.t.)	0
FC Oleksandriya	1
25 September 2019
Alians Lypova Dolyna	1
Balkany Zorya	0
25 September 2019
Obolon-Brovar Kyiv (a.e.t.)	0
Hirnyk-Sport Horishni Plavni	2
25 September 2019
Kremin Kremenchuk	2
Olimpik Donetsk	3
2 October 2019
Rukh Lviv	0
FC Mariupol	1
25 September 2019
MFC Mykolaiv	1
Chornomorets Odesa	0

Round of 16; 30 October 2019
30 October 2019
FC Mynai	2
FC Lviv	0
30 October 2019
Inhulets Petrove	2
SC Dnipro-1	1
30 October 2019
Dynamo Kyiv (a.e.t.)	2
Shakhtar Donetsk	1
30 October 2019
FC Oleksandriya (p)	1 (5)
Zorya Luhansk	1 (4)
30 October 2019
Alians Lypova Dolyna	5
Hirnyk-Sport Horishni Plavni	3
30 October 2019
FC Mariupol	1
Olimpik Donetsk	0
30 October 2019
MFC Mykolaiv	2
Desna Chernihiv	4
30 October 2019
Kolos Kovalivka	0
Vorskla Poltava	1

Quarter-finals; 11–12 March 2020
11 March
FC Mynai (p)	1 (6)
Inhulets Petrove	1 (5)
11 March
Dynamo Kyiv (a.e.t.)	1
FC Oleksandriya	0
11 March
Alians Lypova Dolyna	2
FC Mariupol	4
12 March
Desna Chernihiv	0
Vorskla Poltava	1

Semi-finals; 17–24 June 2020
17 June
FC Mynai	0
Dynamo Kyiv	2
24 June
FC Mariupol	1 (2)
Vorskla Poltava	1 (3)

Final; 8 July 2020
8 July
Dynamo Kyiv	1 (8)
Vorskla Poltava	1 (7)

== Competition schedule ==
Legends: AM – AAFU (amateur) competitions (IV tier), 2L – Second League (III tier), 1L – First League (II tier), PL – Premier League (I tier)

=== First Preliminary round (1/64) ===
In this round eighteen clubs from the Second League and both finalists of the 2018–19 Ukrainian Amateur Cup are scheduled to play. The draw for this round was to be held on 26 July 2019 at the House of Football in Kyiv. The round matches initially were to be played on 7 August 2019. However, on 26 July 2019 it was announced that draw was postponed due to recent changes in leagues composition (withdrawal of Arsenal Kyiv) and conflict with FC Peremoha, the draw was postponed. The draw was finally held on 14 August 2019 with the matches played on 20 August 2019.

20 August 2019	Tavriya Simferopol (III)	5–0	(III) Real Pharma Odesa	Beryslav, Kherson Oblast
16:00	Makarchenko 11', 40'; Dobrovolskyi 12'; Bizhko 23'; Sharabura 78' (pen.)	Report		Stadium: "Mashynobudivnyk"; Attendance: 400; Referee: Roman Halitsyn (Kyiv)

20 August 2019	Enerhiya Nova Kakhovka (III)	1–4	(III) Bukovyna Chernivtsi	Nova Kakhovka, Kherson Oblast
17:00	Bochak 60'	Report	Krashnevskyi 5', 44'; Santrapynskykh 24'; Palahniuk 71'	Stadium: "Enerhiya"; Attendance: 700; Referee: Dmytro Yevtukhov (Dnipro)

20 August 2019	Hirnyk Kryvyi Rih (III)	0–1	(III) Chaika Petropavlivska-Borshchahivka	Kryvyi Rih, Dnipropetrovsk Oblast
17:00		Report	Volk 26' (pen.)	Stadium: of coal mine "Zhovtneva"; Attendance: 750; Referee: Vladyslav Bakulin (Nova Kakhovka)

20 August 2019	Veres Rivne (III)	2–1	(III) Nyva Ternopil	Mlyniv, Rivne Oblast
17:00	Yaremenko 17'; Soldat 90+1'	Report	Skakun 20'	Stadium: "Kolos"; Attendance: 500; Referee: Andriy Koshura (Chernivtsi)

20 August 2019	Podillya Khmelnytskyi (III)	1–0	(III) Polissya Zhytomyr	Khmelnytskyi
17:00	Zuyevych 13'	Report		Stadium: "Podillia"; Attendance: 3,280; Referee: Vadym Podryhulia (Lutsk)

20 August 2019	Nyva Vinnytsia (III)	5–1	(III) FC Nikopol	Vinnytsia
17:00	Kalitov 15'; Maliarenko 26', 57', 70'; Podkuiko 90'	Report	Molochko 4'	Stadium: "Tsentralnyi"; Attendance: 1,500; Referee: Taras Panasiuk (Berdychiv)

20 August 2019	FC Kalush (III)	1–0	(III) VPK-Ahro Mahdalynivka	Kalush, Ivano-Frankivsk Oblast
17:00	Horbachenko 32'	Report		Stadium: "Khimik"; Attendance: 950; Referee: Kateryna Zora (Kyiv)

20 August 2019	Krystal Kherson (III)	1–1 (a.e.t.) (2 – 4 p)	(III) Dinaz Vyshhorod	Kherson
17:30	Barladym 43'	Report	Pryma 89'	Stadium: "Krystal"; Attendance: 950; Referee: Maksym Polishchuk (Kryvyi Rih)
	Penalties
	Tsoi (penalty scored); Barladym (penalty missed); Kucher (penalty missed); Laptiev (penalty scored)		(penalty scored) Ichanskyi; (penalty missed) Voloshyn; (penalty scored) Harbar; (penalty scored) Bryzhenko; (penalty scored) Marchenko

20 August 2019	Alians Lypova Dolyna (III)	2–0	(III) FC Uzhhorod	Sumy
18:00	Duhiyenko 10'; V.Sharai 51'	Report		Stadium: "Yuvileinyi"; Attendance: 2,500; Referee: Andriy Ryzhyi (Dnipro)

20 August 2019	Avanhard Bziv (AM)	0–2 (a.e.t.)	(AM) FC Vovchansk	Shchaslyve, Kyiv Oblast
19:00		Report	Pokosenko 114'; Solomakha 119'	Stadium: STB "Arsenal-Kyiv"; Attendance: 200; Referee: Kateryna Usova (Kyiv)

Notes:

- SC Tavriya Simferopol is forced to play outside of Simferopol due to ongoing the 2014 Russo-Ukrainian War.
- Other teams of NK Veres Rivne, FC Alians Lypova Dolyna, and FC Avanhard Bziv were hosting their opponents on neutral fields as their home turf for various reasons are not available.

=== Second Preliminary round (1/32) ===
In this round 15 clubs will enter from the First League and 10 winners of the previous round (9 clubs from the Second League and 1 amateur club). Due to odd number of teams, one of them received a bye. The draw for this round was held 21 August 2019 at the House of Football in Kyiv. The round matches were played on 27 August 2019.

27 August 2019	Inhulets Petrove (1L)	2–0	(1L) Metalist 1925 Kharkiv	Petrove, Kirovohrad Oblast
18:00	Akymenko 43'; Korobka 45'	Report		Stadium: Inhulets; Attendance: 951; Referee: Oleksandr Kalyonov (Lviv)

27 August 2019	FC Kalush (2L)	1–2	(1L) FC Mynai	Kalush, Ivano-Frankivsk Oblast
18:00	dos Santos 90+2'	Report	Nuriyev 65', 90+4'	Stadium: Khimik; Attendance: 1,500; Referee: Oleh Kohut (Ternopil)

27 August 2019	MFC Mykolaiv (1L)	5 – 1	(1L) Prykarpattia Ivano-Frankivsk	Mykolaiv
17:00	Berko 11'; Buhay 20'; Ihor Semenyna 42' (pen.), 56' (pen.); Kuksenko 71'	Report	Kuzmyn 70'	Stadium: Central City Stadium (upper field); Attendance: 450; Referee: Serhiy Zadyran (Kyiv Oblast)

27 August 2019	Dinaz Vyshhorod (2L)	1–0	(2L) Nyva Vinnytsia	Demydiv, Kyiv Oblast
17:00	Bryzhenko 61'	Report		Stadium: Dinaz; Attendance: 250; Referee: Serhiy Podryhulia (Lutsk)

27 August 2019	Cherkashchyna Cherkasy (1L)	1–2	(1L) Kremin Kremenchuk	Cherkasy
18:00	Koshelyuk 73'	Report	Zozulya 77'; Honcharenko 84'	Stadium: Central City Stadium; Attendance: 800; Referee: Pavlo Dubrovets (Zhytomyr)

27 August 2019	Podillya Khmelnytskyi (2L)	1–1 (a.e.t.) (4–5 p)	(1L) Volyn Lutsk	Khmelnytskyi
17:00	Sasovskyi 89' (o.g.)	Report	Ponomar 11'	Stadium: Podillia Sports Complex; Attendance: 2,840; Referee: Dmytro Kubriak (Odesa)
	Penalties
	Lypovuz (penalty scored); Shpykula (penalty missed); Okhronchuk (penalty missed); Oprya (penalty scored); Volovyk (penalty scored); Kaverin (penalty missed); Pohorilyi (penalty scored); Mohyl (penalty missed)		(penalty missed) Ryabov; (penalty missed) Ponomar; (penalty scored) Karpenko; (penalty scored) Klymets; (penalty scored) Chachua; (penalty missed) Melnychuk; (penalty scored) Ulyanov; (penalty scored) Sasovskyi

27 August 2019	FC Vovchansk (AM)	0 – 1 (a.e.t.)	(1L) Obolon-Brovar Kyiv	Kharkiv
18:00		Report	Mate 116'	Stadium: Sonyachny Stadium; Attendance: 950; Referee: Oleksandr Tytov (Donetsk)

27 August 2019	Veres Rivne (2L)	1 – 2	(1L) Rukh Lviv	Mlyniv, Rivne Oblast
17:00	Solomka 41'	Report	Kondrakov 19'; Klymchuk 21'	Stadium: Kolos; Attendance: 970; Referee: Anastasia Romaniuk (Ivano-Frankivsk)

27 August 2019	Hirnyk-Sport Horishni Plavni (1L)	1–1 (a.e.t.) (6–5 p)	(1L) Metalurh Zaporizhya	Horishni Plavni, Poltava Oblast
17:00	Sukhanov 81'	Report	Razuvayev (penalty missed) '1; Razuvayev 68'	Stadium: Yunist; Attendance: 1,200; Referee: Vladyslav Dorosh (Kyiv)

27 August 2019	Avanhard Kramatorsk (1L)	0 – 0 (a.e.t.) (3–4 p)	(1L) Balkany Zorya	Kramatorsk, Donetsk Oblast
18:00		Report		Stadium: Avanhard (Bernadsky Garden); Attendance: 800; Referee: Klym Zabroda (Kyiv)

27 August 2019	Alians Lypova Dolyna (2L)	4 – 1	(2L) Chaika Petropavlivska-Borshchahivka	Sumy
18:00	Medvedyev 9'; Sharay 19', 27' (pen.); Luchyk 59'	Report	Sukhenko 54'	Stadium: Yuvileinyi; Attendance: 3,300; Referee: P.Detsiuk (Chernihiv)

27 August 2019	Tavriya Simferopol (2L)	2 – 3	(2L) Bukovyna Chernivtsi	Beryslav, Kherson Oblast
16:00	Dobrovolskyi 14'; Makarchenko 21'	Report	Muntian 31'; Krashnevskyi 55'; Shyshyhin 90+1'	Stadium: Mashynobudivnyk; Attendance: 350; Referee: Ihor Horban (Odesa)

Ahrobiznes Volochysk (1L)	bye^{(4)}

Notes:

- ^(4) Ahrobiznes was drawn with a bye berth that became available as a result of withdrawal of Arsenal Kyiv (the Kyivan club officially withdrew on 22 July 2019, a month before the draw, yet was considered for the Ukrainian cup competition by the Ukrainian Association of Football.).

=== Round of 32 (1/16 finals) ===
In this round 6 clubs will enter from the Premier League, 1 club from the First League (Chornomorets Odesa) and 13 winners of the previous round (10 clubs from the First League including one club with bye and 3 clubs from the Second League). The draw for this round was held 28 August 2019 at the House of Football in Kyiv. The round matches will be played on 25 September 2019.

25 September 2019	Kremin Kremenchuk (1L)	2 – 3	(PL) Olimpik Donetsk	Poltava
15:00	Sydorenko 9'; Koshman 76'	Report	Geoffrey 15'; Zotko 41' (pen.); Honcharenko 54' (o.g.)	Stadium: Lokomotyv Stadium; Attendance: 200; Referee: Volodymyr Novokhatniy (Kyiv)

25 September 2019	MFC Mykolaiv (1L)	1 – 0	(1L) Chornomorets Odesa	Mykolaiv
15:00	Panasenko 78'	Report		Stadium: Park Peremohy; Attendance: 1,500; Referee: Andriy Kovalenko (Poltava)

25 September 2019	Obolon-Brovar Kyiv (1L)	0–2 (a.e.t.)	(1L) Hirnyk-Sport Horishni Plavni	Kyiv
19:00		Report	Bilyi 109'; Kotlyar 120+1'	Stadium: Obolon Arena; Attendance: 350; Referee: Oleksandr Derdo (Chornomorsk)

25 September 2019	FC Mynai (1L)	1–0	(1L) Volyn Lutsk	Mynai, Zakarpattia Oblast
16:00	Mayik 85'	Report		Stadium: Mynai Stadium; Attendance: 980; Referee: Viktor Kopiyevskyi (Kropyvnytskyi)

25 September 2019	Alians Lypova Dolyna (2L)	1 – 0	(1L) Balkany Zorya	Sumy
18:00	Sharay 31'	Report		Stadium: Yuvileiny Stadium; Attendance: 4,000; Referee: Kateryna Monzul (Kharkiv)

25 September 2019	Bukovyna Chernivtsi (2L)	0–2	(PL) FC Lviv	Chernivtsi
15:30		Report	Renan 17' (pen.), 79'	Stadium: Bukovyna Stadium; Attendance: 2,500; Referee: Yaroslav Kozyk (Mukacheve)

25 September 2019	Inhulets Petrove (1L)	0–0 (a.e.t.) (7–6 p)	(PL) Karpaty Lviv	Petrove, Kirovohrad Oblast
17:00		Report		Stadium: Inhulets Stadium; Attendance: 1,900; Referee: Mykola Balakin (Kyiv)
	Penalties
	Kozak (penalty missed); Synyohub (penalty scored); Kucherenko (penalty scored); Akymenko (penalty scored); Zaporozhets (penalty scored); Klymenko (penalty scored); Pysko (penalty scored); Fatyeyev (penalty scored)		(penalty scored) Boiciuc; (penalty missed) Kozak; (penalty scored) Nazaryna; (penalty scored) João Diogo; (penalty scored) Vakulenko; (penalty scored) Kirylenka; (penalty scored) Hall; (penalty missed) Dubinchak

25 September 2019	Dinaz Vyshhorod (2L)	0–1 (a.e.t.)	(PL) FC Oleksandriya	Demydiv, Kyiv Oblast
15:00		Report	Hloba 104'	Stadium: Dinaz Stadium; Attendance: 350; Referee: Yuriy Ivanov (Makiivka)

25 September 2019	Ahrobiznes Volochysk (1L)	1–3	(PL) SC Dnipro-1	Volochysk, Khmelnytskyi Oblast
16:00	Chernenko 85'	Report	Buletsa 20'; Kulish 33'; Korkishko 65'	Stadium: Yunist Stadium; Attendance: 3,200; Referee: Serhiy Boiko (Ivankiv)

2 October 2019^{(5)}	Rukh Lviv (1L)	0–1	(PL) FC Mariupol	Lviv
18:00		Report	Horbunov 76'	Stadium: Skif Stadium; Attendance: 4,000; Referee: Dmytro Kryvushkin (Kharkiv)

Notes:

- ^(5) Match rescheduled to 2 October since Mariupol plays its rescheduled Round 4 Ukrainian Premier League game against Dynamo Kyiv.

=== Round of 16 (1/8 finals) ===
In this round the remaining six clubs from the Premier League entered, and the ten winners of the previous round (five clubs from the Premier League, four clubs from the First League and one club from the Second League). The draw for this round was held on 3 October 2019 at the House of Football in Kyiv. The round matches will be played on 30 October 2019.

30 October 2019	Kolos Kovalivka (PL)	0 –1	(PL) Vorskla Poltava	Kyiv
17:00		Report	Kozyrenko 68'	Stadium: Obolon Arena; Attendance: 628; Referee: Maksym Kozyriatskyi (Zaporizhia)

30 October 2019	FC Mynai (1L)	2 –0	(PL) FC Lviv	Mynai, Zakarpattia Oblast
14:00	Dopilka 76'; Hehedosh 83'	Report		Stadium: Mynai Arena; Attendance: 1,310; Referee: Oleksandr Omelchenko (Slovyansk)

30 October 2019	MFC Mykolaiv (1L)	2 –4	(PL) Desna Chernihiv	Mykolaiv
14:00	Sondey 18'; Voytsekhovskyi 61'	Report	Kartushov 20', 90+1'; Filippov 32', 64'	Stadium: Tsentralnyi Miskyi Stadion; Attendance: 1,000; Referee: Oleksandr Shandor (Lviv)

30 October 2019	Alians Lypova Dolyna (2L)	5 –3	(1L) Hirnyk-Sport Horishni Plavni	Sumy
18:00	Zahynaylov 10', 35', 53'; Havras 49'; Duhiyenko 71'	Report	Kravchuk 22'; Zbun 59'; Lykhovydko 90+3'	Stadium: Yuvileiny Stadium; Attendance: 3,300; Referee: Roman Blavatskyi (Lviv)

30 October 2019	Dynamo Kyiv (PL)	2 –1 (a.e.t.)	(PL) Shakhtar Donetsk	Kyiv
19:30	Sydorchuk 22'; Popov 110'	Report	Stepanenko 90+2'	Stadium: Olimpiyskiy National Sports Complex; Attendance: 34,865; Referee: Viktor Kopievskyi (Kropyvnytskyi)

30 October 2019	Inhulets Petrove (1L)	2 –1	(PL) SC Dnipro-1	Petrove, Kirovohrad Oblast
15:00	Akymenko 23', 66' (pen.)	Report	Kulish 41'	Stadium: Inhulets Stadium; Attendance: 600; Referee: Oleksandr Derdo (Chornomorsk)

30 October 2019	FC Mariupol (PL)	1 –0	(PL) Olimpik Donetsk	Mariupol, Donetsk Oblast
14:00	Churko 90+3'	Report		Stadium: Volodymyr Boiko Stadium; Attendance: 1,917; Referee: Yuriy Ivanov (Makiivka) (Note: Officially by UAF, his city representation was "Donetsk Oblast")

30 October 2019	FC Oleksandriya (PL)	1 –1 (a.e.t.) (5–4 p)	(PL) Zorya Luhansk	Oleksandriia, Kirovohrad Oblast
18:00	Ivanisenya 78' (own)	Report	Lyednyev 29'	Stadium: CSC Nika Stadium; Attendance: 1,061; Referee: Ihor Paskhal (Kherson)
	Penalties
	Bukhal (penalty scored); Hrechyshkin (penalty scored); Miroshnichenko (penalty missed); Babohlo (penalty scored); Stetskov (penalty scored); Bezborodko (penalty scored)		(penalty scored) Vernydub; (penalty scored) Lyednyev; (penalty scored) Yurchenko; (penalty scored) Ivanisenya; (penalty missed) Kocherhin; (penalty missed) Kabayev

=== Quarter-finals ===
This round consisted of 5 representatives from the Premier League, 2 teams from the First League, and one team from the Second League advanced to this round. Originally scheduled for 1 November 2019, the draw for this round was postponed for December. The draw for this round was held on 18 December 2019 at the House of Football in Kyiv. The round matches were scheduled to be played on 4 March 2020. On 14 February 2020 the UAF Executive Committee approved changes to the dates of the cup competition as well the Premier Liha. The quarterfinals games were shifted to 11 March 2020.

11 March 2020	FC Mynai (1L)	1–1 (a.e.t.) (6–5 p)	(1L) Inhulets Petrove	Mynai, Zakarpattia Oblast
15:00	Hlahola 30'	Report	Mishurenko 55'	Stadium: Mynai Arena; Attendance: 1,300; Referee: Oleksandr Omelchenko (Sloviansk)
	Penalties
	Karnoza (penalty missed); Mykulyak (penalty scored); Stasyuk (penalty missed); Nuriyev (penalty scored); Kopolovets (penalty scored); Popovich (penalty scored); Zhychykov (penalty missed); Vahin (penalty scored); Mayik (penalty scored)		(penalty scored) Synyohub; (penalty scored) Kovalenko; (penalty missed) Bartulović; (penalty scored) Zahalskyi; (penalty missed) Kvasnyi; (penalty scored) Korobka; (penalty missed) Lupashko; (penalty scored) Balan; (penalty missed) Shust

11 March 2020	Alians Lypova Dolyna (2L)	2–4	(PL) FC Mariupol	Sumy
18:00	Osadchyi 24'; Yaroshenko 45+2'	Report	Kulakov 30'; Yavorskyi 36'; Rohozynskyi 47' (o.g.); Muravskyi 66'	Stadium: Yuvileiny Stadium; Attendance: 6,500; Referee: Ihor Paskhal (Kherson)

11 March 2020	Dynamo Kyiv (PL)	1–0 (a.e.t.)	(PL) FC Oleksandriya	Kyiv
19:30	Tsyhankov 106'	Report		Stadium: Olimpiyskiy National Sports Complex; Attendance: 9,567; Referee: Vitaliy Romanov (Dnipro)

12 March 2020	Desna Chernihiv (PL)	0–1	(PL) Vorskla Poltava	Chernihiv
19:00		Report	Vasin 65' (pen.)	Stadium: Stadion imeni Gagarina; Attendance: 0 (Note: Played behind closed doors due to the COVID-19 pandemic in Ukraine.); Referee: Yevhen Aranovskyi (Kyiv)

=== Semi-finals ===
This round consisted of 3 representatives from the Premier League and a team from the First League. Originally the round matches were to be played on 22 April 2020, but later shifted to 15 April 2020. The draw for this round was held as announced on 13 March 2020 at the House of Football in Kyiv. The nominal host for final was identified at the draw for the Ukrainian Cup semifinals as the Mynai/Dynamo pair. The matches were later postponed due to the pause in all competitions in relation to the COVID-19 pandemic in Ukraine.

17 June 2020	FC Mynai (1L)	0–2	(PL) Dynamo Kyiv	Mynai, Zakarpattia Oblast
14:00		Report	Duelund 9', 39'	Stadium: Mynai Arena; Attendance: 0 Referee: Kateryna Monzul (Kharkiv)

24 June 2020	FC Mariupol (PL)	1–1 (a.e.t.) (2–3 p)	(PL) Vorskla Poltava	Mariupol, Donetsk Oblast
19:30	Horbunov 37'	Report	Kane 80' (pen.)	Stadium: Volodymyr Boiko Stadium; Attendance: 0 Referee: Kateryna Monzul (Kharkiv)
	Penalties
	Kulakov (penalty missed); Kashchuk (penalty scored); Polehenko (penalty scored); Ihnatenko (penalty missed); Korniyenko (penalty missed)		Puclin (penalty scored); Šehić (penalty missed); Kane (penalty scored); Sklyar (penalty scored); Bayenko (penalty missed)

=== Final ===
The city of Ternopil (Ternopilsky Misky Stadion) was set to host its first Ukrainian Cup final and first major competition final overall. The match was originally planned to be held on 13 May 2020, but was later postponed due to the pause in all competitions in relation to the COVID-19 pandemic in Ukraine.

8 July 2020
21:30

Dynamo Kyiv	1–1 (a.e.t.)	Vorskla Poltava
Verbič 28'	Report	Stepanyuk 11'
Penalties
Verbič (penalty scored); Tsyhankov (penalty scored); Kędziora (penalty scored) de Pena (penalty scored); Andriyevskyi (penalty scored); Sydorchuk (penalty scored); Shaparenko (penalty scored); Mykolenko (penalty missed); Shabanov (penalty scored)	8–7	(penalty scored) Puclin; (penalty scored) Kane; (penalty scored) Luizão; (penalty scored) Opanasenko; (penalty scored) Ndiaye; (penalty scored) Chesnakov; (penalty scored) Perduta; (penalty missed) Sapay; (penalty missed) Bayenko

OSC Metalist, Kharkiv
Attendance: 0
Referee: Kateryna Monzul

== Top goalscorers ==
The competition's top ten goalscorers including preliminary rounds.

As of 24 June 2020

Rank	Scorer	Team	Goals (Pen.)
1	(Ukraine) Vladyslav Sharay	Alians Lypova Dolyna	4
2	(Ukraine) Ihor Krashnevskyi	Bukovyna Chernivtsi	3
2	(Ukraine) Artem Makarchenko	Tavriya Simferopol	3
2	(Ukraine) Ihor Malyarenko	Nyva Vinnytsia	3
2	(Ukraine) Serhiy Zahynaylov	Alians Lypova Dolyna	3
2	(Ukraine) Oleksandr Akymenko	Inhulets Petrove	3 (1)

== See also ==
- 2019–20 Ukrainian Premier League
- 2019–20 Ukrainian First League
- 2019–20 Ukrainian Second League
- 2019–20 UEFA Europa League
- 2019–20 Ukrainian Amateur Cup
