= 2021–22 Ukrainian First League =

Ukrainian First League
- Season: 2021–22
- Dates: 25 July 2021 – 24 February 2022 (winter break 28 November 2021)
- Promoted: Metalist; Kryvbas Kryvyi Rih
- Relegated: 8 teams
- Matches: 156
- Goals: 367 (2.35 per match)
- Top goalscorer: Matheus Peixoto (14 goals)
- Biggest home win: 5 goals Kryvbas 5–0 Uzhhorod (12 September 2021)
- Biggest away win: 6 goals Uzhhorod 0–6 Prykarpattia (24 July 2021)
- Highest scoring: 6 goals 4 matches
- Longest winning run: 8 matches Metalist
- Longest unbeaten run: 13 matches Metalist
- Longest winless run: 12 matches Kremin
- Longest losing run: 8 matches Kremin
- Highest attendance: 26,688; Metalist v Prykarpattia (13 November 2021)
- Lowest attendance: 0 – 6 games (Note: Due to the COVID-19 pandemic)
- Total attendance: 450197
- Average attendance: 3001
- All statistics correct as of.

The 2021–22 Ukrainian First League was the 31st since its establishment. The league competition consisted of 16 teams. Earlier in 2021, it was discussed to expand the league to 20 teams with discontinuation of the UPL U-21 competitions, but that initiative was not realized.

Right before the start of the second half, the competition was suspended due to the 2022 Russian invasion of Ukraine on 24 February 2022. Scheduled originally to end on 21 May 2022, it was eventually recognized as abandoned at the PFL Council meeting on 6 May 2022.

== Teams ==
This season, the Ukrainian First League consisted of 16 teams.

=== Promoted teams ===
The following teams have been promoted from the 2020–21 Ukrainian Second League:

- Podillia Khmelnytskyi – first place in Group A (returning after 22 seasons, however FC Krasyliv that was playing as Podillya Khmelnytskyi last competed in the 2006–07 season)
- Uzhhorod – second place in Group A (debut)
- Metalist Kharkiv – first place in Group B (debut, a phoenix club based on the Second League superfinal champions Metal Kharkiv)
- Kryvbas Kryvyi Rih – second place in Group B (returning after 5 seasons, last competed in the 2015–16 as Hirnyk Kryvyi Rih)

=== Relegated teams ===
The following team has been relegated from the 2020–21 Ukrainian Premier League:

- Olimpik Donetsk – placed 13th (returning after 7 seasons, last competed in the 2013–14)

=== Renamed teams ===
- FC Kramatorsk is a successor of FC Avanhard Kramatorsk which since May 30 was called Avanhard-SK Kramatorsk.
- FC Metalist Kharkiv is a successor of FC Metal Kharkiv.

=== Location map ===
The following displays the location of teams.

Home venues of teams in the 2021–22 Ukrainian First League.

== Stadiums ==
The following stadiums were used as home grounds for the teams in the competition. The minimum capacity for stadiums of the First League clubs is set at 1,500 spectators.

Rank	Stadium	Location	Capacity	Club	Notes
1	OSC Metalist	Kharkiv	40,003	Metalist Kharkiv	
2	Yuvileiny Stadium	Sumy	25,830	Alians Lypova Dolyna	
3	Meteor Stadium	Dnipro	24,381	VPK-Ahro Shevchenkivka	
4	Ternopil City Stadium	Ternopil	15,150	Nyva Ternopil	
5	Avanhard Stadium	Lutsk	12,080	Volyn Lutsk	
6	Avanhard Stadium	Uzhhorod	12,000	FC Uzhhorod	
7	Sport Complex Podillya	Khmelnytskyi	6,800	Podillia Khmelnytskyi	
8	MCS Rukh	Ivano-Frankivsk	6,500	Prykarpattia Ivano-Frankivsk	
9	Prapor Stadium	Kramatorsk	6,000	FC Kramatorsk	
10	Central Stadium	Zhytomyr	5,928	Polissia Zhytomyr	
11	Obolon Arena	Kyiv	5,100	Obolon Kyiv	
12	Yunist Stadium	Chernihiv	3,000	Olimpik Donetsk	Matchday 12
13	Yunist Stadium	Volochysk	2,700	Ahrobiznes Volochysk	
14	Hirnyk Stadium	Kryvyi Rih	2,500	Kryvbas Kryvyi Rih	
15	Yunist Stadium	Horishni Plavni	2,500	Hirnyk-Sport Horishni Plavni	
16	Bannikov Stadium	Kyiv	1,678	Olimpik Donetsk	
17	Kremin Stadium	Kremenchuk	1,500	Kremin Kremenchuk	

== Personnel and sponsorship ==
Team	President	Head coach	Kit manufacturer	Shirt sponsor
Ahrobiznes Volochysk	Oleh Sobutskyi	(Ukraine) Oleksandr Chyzhevskyi	Nike	Ahrobiznes
Alians Lypova Dolyna	Serhiy Demchenko	(Ukraine) Anatoliy Bezsmertnyi	Puma	Alians
FC Kramatorsk	Maksym Yefimov	(Ukraine) Oleksiy Horodov	Lotto Sport	Donbasenergo
Hirnyk-Sport Horishni Plavni	Petro Kaplun	(Ukraine) Ihor Zhabchenko	Adidas	Ferrexpo
Kremin Kremenchuk	Serhiy Kovnir	(Ukraine) Roman Loktionov (interim)	Joma	Alfateks
Kryvbas Kryvyi Rih	Kostiantyn Karamanits	(Ukraine) Oleksandr Babych	Joma	Rudomain
Metalist Kharkiv	Oleksandr Yaroslavskyi	(Ukraine) Oleksandr Kucher	Joma	DCH
Olimpik Donetsk	unannounced	(Ukraine) Serhiy Litovchenko	Kelme	YTO
Nyva Ternopil	Oleksandr Stadnyk	(Ukraine) Andriy Kuptsov	Jako	—
Obolon Kyiv	Oleksandr Slobodian	(Ukraine) Valeriy Ivashchenko	Jako	Favorite Sport
Podillia Khmelnytskyi	Yevhen Beiderman	(Ukraine) Vitaliy Kostyshyn	Kelme	—
Polissia Zhytomyr	Volodymyr Zahurskyi	(Ukraine) Yuriy Kalitvintsev	Erreà	BGV Group
Prykarpattia Ivano-Frankivsk	Vasyl Olshanetskyi	(Ukraine) Oleh Rypan	Joma	Adamson
FC Uzhhorod	Ivan Duran	(Ukraine) Bohdan Blavatskyi (interim)	Macron	—
Volyn Lutsk	Vitaliy Kvartsyanyi	(Ukraine) Albert Shakhov	Joma	—
VPK-Ahro Shevchenkivka	Volodymyr Korsun	(Ukraine) Oleksandr Poklonskyi	Nike	VPK-Ahro

=== Managerial changes ===
Team	Outgoing head coach	Manner of departure	Date of vacancy	Table	Incoming head coach	Date of appointment
Polissya Zhytomyr	(Ukraine) Serhiy Shyshchenko	Sacked	13 June 2021	Pre-season	(Ukraine) Yuriy Kalitvintsev	13 June 2021
VPK-Ahro Shevchenkivka	(Ukraine) Serhiy Solovyov	Resigned	14 June 2021	Pre-season	(Ukraine) Oleksandr Hrytsay	29 June 2021
FC Uzhhorod	(Ukraine) Volodymyr Vasyutyk	Mutual consent	21 June 2021	Pre-season	(Ukraine) Mykhaylo Ivanytsia	7 July 2021
Kremin Kremenchuk	(Ukraine) Serhiy Svystun (interim)	End of interim	22 June 2021	Pre-season	(Ukraine) Ihor Stolovytskyi	22 June 2021
Volyn Lutsk	(Ukraine) Vasyl Sachko	Resigned	26 June 2021	Pre-season	(Ukraine) Albert Shakhov	27 June 2021
Olimpik Donetsk	(Ukraine) Roman Sanzhar	Change of ownership	13 July 2021	Pre-season	(Ukraine) Serhiy Litovchenko	19 July 2021
Prykarpattia Ivano-Frankivsk	(Ukraine) Oleh Rypan (interim)	End of interim period	20 July 2021	Pre-season	(Ukraine) Oleh Rypan	20 July 2021
FC Uzhhorod	(Ukraine) Mykhaylo Ivanytsia	Resigned	23 August 2021	16th	(Ukraine) Bohdan Blavatskyi (interim)	23 August 2021
Nyva Ternopil	(Ukraine) Ihor Klymovskyi	Mutual consent	29 September 2021	6th	(Ukraine) Andriy Kuptsov	8 October 2021
Kremin Kremenchuk	(Ukraine) Ihor Stolovytskyi	Mutual consent	26 October 2021	13th	(Ukraine) Roman Loktionov (interim)	28 October 2021
VPK-Ahro Shevchenkivka	(Ukraine) Oleksandr Hrytsay	Undisclosed	25 December 2021	14th	(Ukraine) Oleksandr Poklonskyi	25 December 2021
Alians Lypova Dolyna	(Ukraine) Yuriy Yaroshenko	Changed position	26 January 2022	3rd	(Ukraine) Anatoliy Bezsmertnyi	26 January 2022

== League table ==
Pos	Team	Pld	W	D	L	GF	GA	GD	Pts	Promotion, qualification or relegation
1	Metalist Kharkiv (P)	20	17	2	1	52	9	+43	53	Promotion to Ukrainian Premier League
2	Kryvbas Kryvyi Rih (P)	20	12	6	2	38	17	+21	42	Promotion to Ukrainian Premier League
3	Alians Lypova Dolyna (Note: Due to Russo-Ukrainian War, Olimpik Donetsk, Uzhhorod, Podillia Khmelnytskyi, Alians Lypova Dolyna, VPK-Ahro Shevchenkivka and Ahrobiznes Volochysk withdrew from competitions after season.)	19	10	3	6	33	24	+9	33 (Note: Head-to-head: Alians 3p; Obolon 0p)	Withdrew after season
4	Obolon Kyiv	19	10	3	6	24	16	+8	33	
5	Nyva Ternopil	20	8	5	7	22	22	0	29 (Note: Head-to-head: Nyva 6p; Hirnyk-Sport 0p)	
6	Hirnyk-Sport Horishni Plavni	20	8	5	7	15	17	−2	29	
7	Prykarpattia Ivano-Frankivsk	20	8	4	8	27	26	+1	28	
8	Podillya Khmelnytskyi	20	7	5	8	19	18	+1	26	Withdrew after season
9	Polissia Zhytomyr	18	7	4	7	21	17	+4	25	
10	Volyn Lutsk	19	6	7	6	17	20	−3	25	Withdrew after season
11	Olimpik Donetsk	19	7	2	10	19	23	−4	23	Withdrew after season
12	Kramatorsk	18	7	1	10	16	24	−8	22	Withdrew after season
13	Ahrobiznes Volochysk	20	4	9	7	16	23	−7	21	Withdrew after season
14	VPK-Ahro Shevchenkivka	20	5	3	12	16	28	−12	18	Withdrew after season
15	Uzhhorod	20	4	4	12	16	40	−24	16	Withdrew after season
16	Kremin Kremenchuk	20	4	1	15	16	43	−27	13	

Source: PFL.ua
Rules for classification: 1) Points; 2) Head-to-head points; 3) Head-to-head goal difference; 4) Head-to-head goals scored; 5) Goal difference in all games; 6) Goals scored in all games (Note: calculation by criteria indicated in rules 2, 3, 4 is conducted with consideration of all teams that have an equal number of tournament points at the moment of calculation and not only among those which after preliminary criteria have appeared more successful).
(P) Promoted

=== Results ===
Home \ Away	AHR	ALD	HIS	KRA	KRE	KRY	MET	NYV	OBL	OLD	POD	POL	PRY	UZH	VOL	VPK
Ahrobiznes Volochysk			0–1	2–0		0–0	2–1			0–2	0–0	0–0		1–1	2–2	1–0
Alians Lypova Dolyna	3–2		4–0	1–0		2–1	0–2		3–2	2–1				2–3	0–0	3–3
Hirnyk-Sport Horishni Plavni				0–2	0–1	1–2	1–1	0–2		0–2	0–0	1–0		0–0	1–1	
FC Kramatorsk	1–1	0–2	0–1		2–0		0–3	2–0			2–1			3–2		
Kremin Kremenchuk	3–1	0–1		0–1		0–5		1–2		2–0		0–3	1–1			2–0
Kryvbas Kryvyi Rih	1–1		0–0	3–0	4–1		0–5	1–0		4–1	3–2			5–0	2–1	
Metalist Kharkiv		2–0			4–0			2–1	3–0	3–0	3–0	1–1	4–0	3–1		2–0
Nyva Ternopil	1–1	1–5	1–0		4–2	1–2			0–1	0–0		1–0	0–2			2–0
Obolon Kyiv	3–1		0–3		2–0	0–0	1–2			0–0			3–1	0–1	1–0	
Olimpik Donetsk			0–1	3–1		0–2	1–2	0–1			1–0		2–0		1–2	
Podillia Khmelnytskyi		0–0		2–1	4–1			1–1	0–0	0–1		1–0	0–2		2–0	3–0
Polissia Zhytomyr	1–0	3–1	0–2		2–0	1–2		1–1	1–4		1–2		2–0			3–1
Prykarpattia Ivano-Frankivsk	0–0	3–1	0–1	2–0		1–1	1–4		0–2	2–1				3–1	1–1	
FC Uzhhorod					2–0		0–2	0–2	0–2	1–3	0–1	0–2	0–6		1–0	1–3
Volyn Lutsk	0–1	1–0			3–2		0–3	1–1			1–0	0–0	2–1	1–1		1–0
VPK-Ahro Shevchenkivka	3–0	0–3	1–2	1–0	2–0	0–0			0–2		1–0		0–1	1–1		

Updated to match(es) played on 29 November 2021. Source: Calendar (in Ukrainian)
Legend: Blue = home team win; Yellow = draw; Red = away team win.

== Top goalscorers ==
As of 29 November 2021

Rank	Scorer	Team	Goals (Pen.)
1	(Brazil) Matheus Peixoto	Metalist Kharkiv	14 (3)
2	(Ukraine) Oleksiy Khoblenko	Kryvbas Kryvyi Rih	11
3	(Ukraine) Serhiy Kyslenko	Nyva Ternopil	8
3	(Ukraine) Roman Barchuk	Prykarpattia Ivano-Frankivsk	8 (3)
3	(Ukraine) Serhiy Zahynaylov	Alians Lypova Dolyna	8 (3)
6	(Ukraine) Mykola Ahapov	Alians Lypova Dolyna	6
6	(Ukraine) Yevhen Banada	Metalist Kharkiv	6
6	(Ukraine) Denys Halata	Kremin Kremenchuk	6
6	(Ukraine) Bohdan Kobzar	Volyn Lutsk	6
6	(Ukraine) Artem Shchedryi	Kryvbas Kryvyi Rih	6
6	(Colombia) Brayan Riascos	Metalist Kharkiv	6 (1)
6	(Ukraine) Roman Debelko	Kryvbas Kryvyi Rih	6 (2)
6	(Ukraine) Stanislav Kulish	VPK-Ahro Shevchenkivka	6 (3)
6	(France) Farès Bahlouli	Metalist Kharkiv	6 (4)

=== Hat-tricks ===
Player	For	Against	Result	Date	Reference
(Ukraine) Oleksiy Khoblenko^{4}	Kryvbas Kryvyi Rih	Uzhhorod	5–0 (H)	12 September 2021	

^{4} Player scored four goals

== Awards ==
=== Monthly awards ===
Month	Player of the Month		Ref.
Month	Player	Club	Ref.
August 2021	(Ukraine) Oleksiy Khoblenko	Kryvbas Kryvyi Rih	
September 2021	no data		
October 2021	no data		
November 2021	no data		

=== Round awards ===
Round	Player			Coach		
Round	Player	Club	Reference	Coach	Club	Reference
Round 1	(Ukraine) Artem Shchedryi	Kryvbas Kryvyi Rih		(Ukraine) Ihor Klymovskyi	Nyva Ternopil	
Round 2	(Ukraine) Ruslan Zubkov	Kramatorsk		(Ukraine) Hennadiy Prykhodko	Kryvbas Kryvyi Rih	
Round 3	(Ukraine) Vitaliy Hrusha	Ahrobiznes Volochysk		(Ukraine) Oleksandr Chyzhevskyi	Ahrobiznes Volochysk	
Round 4	(Colombia) Brayan Riascos	Metalist Kharkiv		(Ukraine) Yuriy Yaroshenko	Alians Lypova Dolyna	
Round 5	(Ukraine) Stanislav Kulish	VPK-Ahro Shevchenkivka		(Ukraine) Serhiy Litovchenko	Olimpik Donetsk	
Round 6	(Brazil) Matheus Peixoto	Metalist Kharkiv		(Ukraine) Yuriy Kalitvintsev	Polissia Zhytomyr	
Round 7	(Ukraine) Roman Barchuk	Prykarpattia Ivano-Frankivsk		(Ukraine) Yuriy Yaroshenko (2)	Alians Lypova Dolyna	
Round 8	(Ukraine) Oleksiy Khoblenko	Kryvbas Kryvyi Rih		(Ukraine) Yuriy Yaroshenko (3)	Alians Lypova Dolyna	
Round 9	(Ukraine) Maksym Pryadun	Olimpik Donetsk		(Ukraine) Vitaliy Kostyshyn	Podillia Khmelnytskyi	
Round 10	(France) Farès Bahlouli	Metalist Kharkiv		(Ukraine) Oleksandr Kucher	Metalist Kharkiv	
Round 11	(Ukraine) Mykola Ahapov	Alians Lypova Dolyna		(Ukraine) Bohdan Blavatskyi	Uzhhorod	
Round 12	(Ivory Coast) Néné Gbamblé	Olimpik Donetsk		(Ukraine) Ihor Zhabchenko	Hirnyk-Sport Horishni Plavni	
Round 13	(Ukraine) Ruslan Palamar	Hirnyk-Sport Horishni Plavni		(Ukraine) Ihor Zhabchenko (2)	Hirnyk-Sport Horishni Plavni	
Round 14	(Ukraine) Serhiy Kyslenko	Nyva Ternopil		(Ukraine) Oleksandr Chyzhevskyi (2)	Ahrobiznes Volochysk	
Round 15	(Ukraine) Roman Barchuk	Prykarpattia Ivano-Frankivsk		(Ukraine) Oleh Rypan	Prykarpattia Ivano-Frankivsk	
Round 16	(Ukraine) Yevhen Pidlepenets	Metalist Kharkiv		(Ukraine) Oleksandr Kucher (2)	Metalist Kharkiv	
Round 17	(Ukraine) Serhiy Zahynaylov	Alyans Lypova Dolyna		(Ukraine) Ihor Zhabchenko (3)	Hirnyk-Sport Horishni Plavni	
Round 18	(Ukraine) Mykola Hayduchyk	Uzhhorod		(Ukraine) Albert Shakhov	Volyn Lutsk	
Round 19	(Ukraine) Serhiy Zahynaylov (2)	Alyans Lypova Dolyna		(Ukraine) Valeriy Ivashchenko	Obolon Kyiv	
Round 20	(Ukraine) Stanislav Sharay	Alyans Lypova Dolyna		(Ukraine) Vitaliy Kostyshyn (2)	Podillia Khmelnytskyi	
winter break
Round 21						
Round 22						
Round 23						
Round 24						
Round 25						
Round 26						
Round 27						
Round 28						
Round 29						
Round 30						

== Number of teams by region ==
Number	Region	Team(s)
2	Dnipropetrovsk Oblast	VPK-Ahro and Kryvbas
2	Donetsk Oblast	Kramatorsk and Olimpik
2	Khmelnytskyi Oblast	Ahrobiznes and Podillia
2	Poltava Oblast	Hirnyk-Sport and Kremin
1	Ivano-Frankivsk Oblast	Prykarpattia
1	Kharkiv Oblast	Metalist
1	Kyiv	Obolon
1	Sumy Oblast	Alians
1	Ternopil Oblast	Nyva
1	Volyn Oblast	Volyn
1	Zakarpattia Oblast	Uzhhorod
1	Zhytomyr Oblast	Polissia

== See also ==
- 2021–22 Ukrainian Premier League
- 2021–22 Ukrainian Second League
- 2021–22 Ukrainian Football Amateur League
- 2021–22 Ukrainian Cup
- List of Ukrainian football transfers summer 2021
