= 2019–20 Ukrainian Second League =

Ukrainian Second League
- Season: 2019–20
- Champions: Nyva T. (Group A); VPK-Ahro (Group B)
- Promoted: Nyva T. (Group A); Polissya (Group A); VPK-Ahro (Group B); Krystal (Group B); Veres (playoff); Alians (playoff)
- Relegated: Chornomorets-2; Avanhard-2
- Matches: 220
- Goals: 569 (2.59 per match)
- Top goalscorer: 11 – Mykhailo Shestakov (Veres)
- Biggest home win: 5 – Chornomorets-2 – Tavriya 6:1 (Round 8), Veres – Podillia 5:0 (Round 12), Alians – Real Pharma 5:0 (Round 19)
- Biggest away win: 6 – Mykolaiv-2 – Krystal 1:7 (Round 6)
- Highest scoring: 9 – Bukovyna – Veres 5:4 (Round 20)
- Highest attendance: 5,100 – Podillya – Polissia 1:0 (Round 9)
- Lowest attendance: 0 – Nyva V. – Veres 1:1 (Round 4); Nyva V. – Kalush 0:3 (Round 2)
- Total attendance: 173900
- Average attendance: 790
- All statistics correct as of 24 November 2019.

The 2019–20 Ukrainian Second League was the 29th since its establishment. On 6 June 2019 the PFL council of leagues presented its plan draft ("contours") for the next season for both its First and its Second leagues. The final decision for the season was adopted at the 27th PFL Conference that took place on 27 June 2019.

== Summary ==
The season kicked off on 27 July 2019 along with the First League. Both groups A and B completed their double round-robin tournament on 23 November 2019 before going on winter break. Following the break the spring half of the season that should have started on 21 March 2020 and featured another single round-robin tournament ending on 23 May 2020. On 17 March 2020, the Ukrainian Association of Football adopted its decision to pause all football competitions in the country since 18 March 2020 for unspecified period of time (until adaptation of its next decision to resume all football events) due to the coronavirus pandemic.

On 21 May 2020, the PFL council of leagues at its open-air session at Obolon Arena adopted decision by vote of majority of the Second League clubs to cancel the spring half of the season and recognize winter break standings as final. Also, since the season's calendar was cut short, there were made some additional amendments including rotation of clubs between leagues.

After several PFL meetings, the UAF Executive Committee finally approved completion of the season by decisions of those meetings on 12 June 2020.

The post season games took place in the second half of August, yet beside the championship final (between winners of groups A and B).

== Teams ==
=== Promoted teams ===
Four teams have been promoted from the 2018–19 Ukrainian Football Amateur League:

- FC Uzhhorod – 6th place of Group 1 (debut)
- Alians Lypova Dolyna – 3rd place of Group 2 (debut)
- Dinaz Vyshhorod – 5th place of Group 2 (debut)
- VPK-Ahro Shevchenkivka – 1st place of Group 3 (debut)

Three reserve teams were added also without participation in the Ukrainian Football Amateur League:

- Obolon-Brovar-2 Bucha – (returning after an absence of six seasons, previously as Obolon-2 Kyiv)
- Chornomorets-2 Odesa – (returning after an absence of seven seasons)
- Avanhard-2 Kramatorsk – (debut)

One more team from Ukrainian Amateur Football Championship, FC Peremoha Dnipro, announced that it will contest its certification for professional competitions in the Court of Arbitration for Sport (CAS) in Lausanne against the Ukrainian Association of Football and its licensing committee.

=== Relegated teams ===
The following teams have been relegated from the 2018–19 Ukrainian First League:

- None – PFC Sumy placed 14th place of the 2018–19 Ukrainian First League but had its professional status taken away almost at the end of the season. The club nonetheless played relegation play-off as a de facto non-professional team. On 10 October 2019 the UAF Appellation Committee canceled previous decision of the UAF CDC and sent the case for new investigation. According to chief editor of "Futbol" Artem Frankov, accusations of Francesco Baranca were groundless.

=== Reorganized/reformed teams ===
- FC Nikopol was reorganized from public organization into a community institution of physical culture and sports.
- FC Real Pharma Odesa was reorganized

=== Withdrawn teams ===
- PFC Sumy has been stripped of professional status last season.
- Myr Hornostayivka, the president of the club announced last season that will withdraw the club for the next season.

=== Location map ===
The following map displays the location of teams. Group A teams marked in red. Group B teams marked in green.

Home venues of teams in the 2019–20 Ukrainian Second League. SC Tavriya is forced to play its home games outside of Crimea.

== Stadiums ==
Group A
Team	Stadium	Position in 2018–19
Bukovyna Chernivtsi	Bukovyna Stadium	10th
Chaika (Note: Chaika although located in Petropavlivska Borshchahivka in Kyiv-Sviatoshyn Raion outside the city limits of Kyiv began the competition playing in Makariv due to the heat affecting players playing on the artificial surface at Dinaz Stadium.)	M.K.Brukvenko Central Stadium	8th
Dinaz Vyshhorod	Dinaz Stadium	Am 5th
FC Kalush	Khimik Stadium	7th
Nyva Ternopil	City Stadium	6th
Nyva Vinnytsia	Sports Complex Nyva	4th
Obolon-Brovar-2 Bucha	Yuvileiny Stadium	N/A
Podillya Khmelnytskyi	Sport Complex Podillya	9th
Polissya Zhytomyr	Avanhard Stadium (Note: Polissya Zhytomyr continue to play their home games in Novohrad-Volynskyi due to the construction of both Central Stadium and Spartak Stadium) Spartak Arena	3rd
FC Uzhhorod	Avanhard Stadium	Am 6th
Veres Rivne	Kolos Stadium (Note: Due to the unavailability of Avanhard Stadium, Veres Rivne play in Mlyniv.)	5th

Group B
Team	Stadium	Position in 2018–19
Alians Lypova Dolyna	Yuvileiny Stadium	Am 3rd
Avanhard-2 Kramatorsk	Prapor Stadium	N/A
Chornomorets-2 Odesa	Lyustdorf Stadium	N/A
Enerhiya Nova Kakhovka	Enerhiya Stadium	6th
Hirnyk Kryvyi Rih	Shakhta Zhovtneva Stadium	3rd
Krystal Kherson	Krystal Stadium	4th
MFC Mykolaiv-2	Park Peremohy Stadium	9th
FC Nikopol	Elektrometalurh Stadium	10th
Real Pharma Odesa	Ivan Stadium	8th
Tavriya Simferopol	Mashynobudivnyk Stadium (Note: Tavriya Simferopol continue to play their home matches in Beryslav although they had registered to play at Enerhiya Stadium in Nova Kakhovka. All matches will be played in Kherson Oblast of Ukraine due to the Annexation of Crimea by the Russian Federation)	7th
VPK-Ahro Shevchenkivka	Metalurh Stadium (Note: VPK-Ahro debuted in Second League with games in Novomoskovsk, but in October moved back home.) Kolos Arena	Am 1st

== Managers ==
Club	Head coach	Replaced coach
Alians Lypova Dolyna	(Ukraine) Yuriy Yaroshenko	
Avanhard-2 Kramatorsk	(Ukraine) Oleksandr Ivashchenko	
Bukovyna Chernivtsi	(Ukraine) Stepan Makoviychuk (interim)	(Ukraine) Andriy Melnychuk
Chaika Petropavlivska Borshchahivka	(Ukraine) Taras Ilnytskyi	
Chornomorets-2 Odesa	(Ukraine) Albert Kovalyov	
Dinaz Vyshhorod	(Ukraine) Volodymyr Bondarenko	
Enerhiya Nova Kakhovka	(Ukraine) Oleh Fedorchuk	
Hirnyk Kryvyi Rih	(Ukraine) Hennadiy Prykhodko	
FC Kalush	(Ukraine) Stepan Matviyiv	(Ukraine) Vasyl Kachur
Krystal Kherson	(Ukraine) Eduard Khavrov	
MFC Mykolaiv-2	(Ukraine) Mykola Popelyshko	(Ukraine) Yuriy Chaus (Ukraine) Vyacheslav Mazarati (interim)
FC Nikopol	(Ukraine) Hryhoriy Varzhelenko	
Nyva Ternopil	(Ukraine) Vasyl Malyk	
Nyva Vinnytsia	(Ukraine) Oleh Shumovytskyi	(Ukraine) Colince Ngaha
Obolon-Brovar-2 Bucha	(Ukraine) Oleksandr Antonenko	(Ukraine) Oleh Mazurenko
Podillya Khmelnytskyi	(Ukraine) Vitaliy Kostyshyn	
Polissya Zhytomyr	(Ukraine) Anatoliy Bezsmertnyi	
Real Pharma Odesa	(Ukraine) Oleksandr Spitsyn	
Tavriya Simferopol	(Ukraine) Serhiy Shevchenko	
FC Uzhhorod	Vacant	(Ukraine) Vasyl Varha (Ukraine) Mykhailo Ivanytsia
Veres Rivne	(Ukraine) Yuriy Virt	
VPK-Ahro Shevchenkivka	(Ukraine) Serhiy Solovyov	

=== Managerial changes ===
Team	Outgoing head coach	Manner of departure	Date of vacancy	Table	Incoming head coach	Date of appointment	Table
FC Uzhhorod	(Ukraine) Myroslav Babiak	Resigned	7 June 2019	Pre-season	(Ukraine) Vasyl Varha	7 June 2019	Pre-season
Veres Rivne	(Ukraine) Oleh Shandruk	Resigned	14 June 2019	Pre-season	(Ukraine) Yuriy Virt	14 June 2019	Pre-season
FC Kalush	(Ukraine) Andriy Nesteruk (interim)	End of interim	25 June 2019	Pre-season	(Ukraine) Vasyl Kachur	25 June 2019	Pre-season
Obolon-Brovar-2 Bucha	new club			Pre-season	(Ukraine) Oleh Mazurenko	26 June 2019	Pre-season
Chornomorets-2 Odesa	new club			Pre-season	(Ukraine) Albert Kovalyov	26 June 2019	Pre-season
Avanhard-2 Kramatorsk	new club			Pre-season	(Ukraine) Oleksandr Ivashchenko	26 June 2019	Pre-season
Krystal Kherson	(Ukraine) Andriy Kononenko (interim)	Resigned	28 June 2019	Pre-season	(Ukraine) Eduard Khavrov	9 July 2019	Pre-season
Bukovyna Chernivtsi	(Ukraine) Vitaliy Kunytsia (interim)	End of interim term	2 July 2019	Pre-season	(Ukraine) Andriy Melnychuk	2 July 2019	Pre-season
MFC Mykolaiv-2	(Ukraine) Volodymyr Ponomarenko	Reassigned	13 July 2019	Pre-season	(Ukraine) Yuriy Chaus (interim)	13 July 2019	Pre-season
MFC Mykolaiv-2	(Ukraine) Yuriy Chaus (interim)	Change of contract	28 July 2019	Pre-season	(Ukraine) Yuriy Chaus	28 July 2019	Pre-season
Real Pharma Odesa	(Ukraine) Andriy Kovalenko	Sacked	22 August 2019	10th	(Ukraine) Oleksandr Spitsyn	22 August 2019	10th
Bukovyna Chernivtsi	(Ukraine) Andriy Melnychuk	Resigned	9 September 2019	11th	(Ukraine) Stepan Makoviychuk (interim)	9 September 2019	11th
MFC Mykolaiv-2	(Ukraine) Yuriy Chaus	Assigned to MFC Mykolaiv	16 October 2019	5th	(Ukraine) Vyacheslav Mazarati (interim)	16 October 2019	5th
FC Kalush	(Ukraine) Vasyl Kachur	Change of contract	16 October 2019	6th	(Ukraine) Stepan Matviyiv	16 October 2019	6th
Nyva Vinnytsia	(Ukraine) Colince Ngaha	Resigned	26 November 2019	9th	(Ukraine) Oleh Shumovytskyi	22 December 2019	9th
FC Uzhhorod	(Ukraine) Vasyl Varha	Undisclosed	29 November 2019	10th	(Ukraine) Mykhailo Ivanytsia	29 November 2019	10th
Obolon-Brovar-2 Bucha	(Ukraine) Oleh Mazurenko	Assigned to Obolon-Brovar Kyiv	13 January 2020	11th	(Ukraine) Oleksandr Antonenko	13 January 2020	11th
MFC Mykolaiv-2	(Ukraine) Vyacheslav Mazarati (interim)	End of interim term	13 January 2020	7th	(Ukraine) Mykola Popelyshko	13 January 2020	7th

== Group A ==
Pos	Team	Pld	W	D	L	GF	GA	GD	Pts	Promotion, qualification or relegation
1	Nyva Ternopil (P)	20	12	5	3	27	12	+15	41	Promotion to Ukrainian First League
2	Polissya Zhytomyr (P)	20	11	6	3	28	11	+17	39	Promotion to Ukrainian First League
3	Veres Rivne (Q, P)	20	11	3	6	34	23	+11	36	Qualification to promotion play-offs
4	Dinaz Vyshhorod	20	9	4	7	27	24	+3	31	
5	FC Kalush	20	8	5	7	26	20	+6	29 (Note: Kalush: 3 pts, +2 gd; Podillia: 3 pts, -2 gd)	
6	Podillya Khmelnytskyi	20	8	5	7	23	25	−2	29	
7	Chaika Petropavlivska Borshchahivka	20	7	5	8	25	21	+4	26	
8	Bukovyna Chernivtsi	20	6	2	12	25	36	−11	20 (Note: Bukovyna: 4 pts; Nyva V.: 1 pts)	
9	Nyva Vinnytsia	20	5	5	10	22	28	−6	20	
10	FC Uzhhorod	20	5	4	11	19	36	−17	19	
11	Obolon-Brovar-2 Bucha	20	4	4	12	18	38	−20	16	Relegation to Amateurs (canceled)

Updated to match(es) played on 24 November 2019. Source: PFL Official Website
Rules for classification: 1) Points; 2) Head-to-head points; 3) Head-to-head goal difference; 4) Head-to-head goals scored; 5) Goal difference; 6) Goals scored.
(P) Promoted; (Q) Qualified for the phase indicated

=== Results ===
Home \ Away	BUK	CPB	DIN	KAL	NVT	NVV	OB2	POD	POL	UZH	VER	BUK	CPB	DIN	KAL	NVT	NVV	OB2	POD	POL	UZH	VER
Bukovyna		2–1	0–1	1–2	0–2	1–0	3–0	1–4	0–2	1–3	5–4			DNP			DNP	DNP	DNP	DNP		
Chaika	3–0		0–0	1–0	2–1	2–1	2–2	0–1	0–1	2–0	1–2	DNP			DNP	DNP					DNP	DNP
Dinaz	3–2	1–2		0–3	0–3	2–1	0–1	3–1 (Note: Scheduled for 27 October 2019, the game was postponed on request of FC Podillia as its players have epidemic of meningitis. The postponed game will take place on 20 November 2019.)	0–0	3–2	4–0		DNP		DNP		DNP	DNP		DNP		
FC Kalush	0–2	0–0	1–1		1–3	2–0	1–1	5–2	0–2	2–1	2–1	DNP				DNP			DNP		DNP	DNP
Nyva Ternopil	2–1	1–0	0–1	0–3		3–1	1–0	2–2	1–0	0–0	0–0	DNP		DNP					DNP	DNP	DNP	
Nyva Vinnytsia	2–2	2–0	1–0	0–3	0–1		2–2	2–0	0–0	2–2 (Note: Instead of taken place on September 4, 2019, the Round 7 game was postponed to September 25, 2019.)	1–1		DNP		DNP	DNP					DNP	DNP
Obolon-Brovar-2	2–1	0–4	1–2	0–0	1–2	1–2		0–3	0–3	4–0	0–4		DNP		DNP	DNP	DNP					DNP
Podillya	0–1	1–1	1–1	1–0	0–0	2–1	1–0		1–0	3–0	0–1		DNP	DNP			DNP	DNP		DNP		
Polissya	2–2	3–3	1–0	2–0	0–0	1–0	4–1	2–0		0–0	2–0		DNP		DNP		DNP	DNP				DNP
FC Uzhhorod	1–0	2–1	2–4	1–0	0–4	0–2	3–1	0–0	1–2		1–2	DNP		DNP				DNP	DNP	DNP		
Veres	2–0	1–0	2–1	1–1	0–1	3–2	0–1	5–0	2–1	3–0		DNP		DNP		DNP			DNP		DNP	

Updated to match(es) played on 24 November 2019. Source: pfl.ua (in Ukrainian)
Legend: Blue = home team win; Yellow = draw; Red = away team win.

=== Position by round ===
Team ╲ Round	1	2	3	4	5	6	7	8	9	10	11	12	13	14	15	16	17	18	19	20	21	22	23	24	25	26	27	28	29	30	31	32	33
Nyva Ternopil	7	4	3	1	1	1	1	1	1	1	1	1	1	1	1	2	2	1	3	2	1	1	–	–	–	–	–	–	–	–	–	–	–
Polissya Zhytomyr	3	1	1	2	3	3	3	2	3	2	2	2	2	2	2	1	1	2	1	1	2	2	–	–	–	–	–	–	–	–	–	–	–
Veres Rivne	2	6	4	4	2	2	2	4	4	4	4	3	4	3	3	3	3	3	2	3	3	3	–	–	–	–	–	–	–	–	–	–	–
Dinaz Vyshhorod	10	11	9	8	9	9	9	8	7	6	6	4	3	4	4	5	5	6	6	6	5	4	–	–	–	–	–	–	–	–	–	–	–
FC Kalush	5	3	2	3	5	4	5	5	5	5	5	6	6	7	6	6	6	4	4	4	6	5	–	–	–	–	–	–	–	–	–	–	–
Podillya Khmelnytskyi	8	7	5	5	4	5	4	3	2	3	3	5	5	6	5	4	4	5	5	5	4	6	–	–	–	–	–	–	–	–	–	–	–
Chaika Petropavlivska Borshchahivka	6	8	8	9	8	8	8	9	9	10	10	8	9	9	9	10	9	9	7	7	7	7	–	–	–	–	–	–	–	–	–	–	–
Bukovyna Chernivtsi	11	9	10	11	11	11	10	11	11	9	9	11	8	8	8	9	11	11	10	10	10	8	–	–	–	–	–	–	–	–	–	–	–
Nyva Vinnytsia	9	10	11	10	10	10	11	10	10	11	11	10	11	10	10	8	8	8	9	9	8	9	–	–	–	–	–	–	–	–	–	–	–
FC Uzhhorod	1	5	7	7	7	6	6	6	6	7	7	7	7	5	7	7	7	7	8	8	9	10	–	–	–	–	–	–	–	–	–	–	–
Obolon-Brovar-2 Bucha	4	2	6	6	6	7	7	7	8	8	8	9	10	11	11	11	10	10	11	11	11	11	–	–	–	–	–	–	–	–	–	–	–

Updated to match(es) played on 24 November 2019. Source: pfl.ua

=== Top goalscorers ===
As of 24 November 2019

Rank	Scorer	Team	Goals (Pen.)	Games
1	(Ukraine) Mykhailo Shestakov	Veres Rivne	11 (2)	19
2	(Ukraine) Yaroslav Halenko	Polissya Zhytomyr	10 (1)	20
3	(Ukraine) Volodymyr Tymenko	Chaika Petropavlivska Borshchahivka	9 (1)	20

=== Number of teams by region (Group A) ===
Number	Region	Team(s)
3	Kyiv Oblast	Dinaz, Chaika and Obolon-Brovar-2
1	Chernivtsi Oblast	Bukovyna
1	Ivano-Frankivsk Oblast	Kalush
1	Khmelnytskyi Oblast	Podillya
1	Rivne Oblast	Veres
1	Ternopil Oblast	Nyva T.
1	Vinnytsia Oblast	Nyva V.
1	Zakarpattia Oblast	Uzhhorod
1	Zhytomyr Oblast	Polissya

== Group B ==
Pos	Team	Pld	W	D	L	GF	GA	GD	Pts	Promotion, qualification or relegation
1	VPK-Ahro Shevchenkivka (P)	20	15	3	2	47	15	+32	48	Promotion to Ukrainian First League
2	Krystal Kherson (P)	20	15	2	3	47	17	+30	47 (Note: Krystal: 3 pts +1 gd; Alians: 3 pts, -1 gd)	Promotion to Ukrainian First League
3	Alians Lypova Dolyna (Q, P)	20	15	2	3	51	12	+39	47	Qualification to promotion play-offs
4	Hirnyk Kryvyi Rih	20	10	3	7	33	22	+11	33	
5	Enerhiya Nova Kakhovka	20	6	7	7	25	26	−1	25	
6	FC Nikopol	20	6	6	8	22	24	−2	24	
7	MFC Mykolaiv-2	20	5	8	7	18	32	−14	23	Promotion restrictions
8	Tavriya Simferopol	20	5	2	13	12	32	−20	17	
9	Real Pharma Odesa	20	4	4	12	10	38	−28	16	
10	Avanhard-2 Kramatorsk	20	3	5	12	15	37	−22	14	Withdrawn after the season
11	Chornomorets-2 Odesa	20	3	4	13	17	42	−25	13	Withdrawn after the season

Updated to match(es) played on 24 November 2019. Source: PFL Official Website
Rules for classification: 1) Points; 2) Head-to-head points; 3) Head-to-head goal difference; 4) Head-to-head goals scored; 5) Goal difference; 6) Goals scored.
(P) Promoted; (Q) Qualified for the phase indicated

=== Results ===
Home \ Away	ALP	AV2	CH2	ENK	HIR	KRY	MK2	NIK	RPO	TAV	VPK	ALP	AV2	CH2	ENK	HIR	KRY	MK2	NIK	RPO	TAV	VPK
Alians		2–0	4–0	1–1	3–2	2–1	3–0	2–0	5–0	3–0	0–1		DNP			DNP			DNP		DNP	DNP
Avanhard-2	1–4		0–1	1–2	2–1	0–0	0–0	0–3	1–2	+:- (Note: Scheduled for 27 October 2019, the game was postponed on request of SC Tavriya as its players have epidemic of flu. The game was postponed to 19 November 2019, but never took place. On 28 November 2019 it was confirmed that the UAF CDC awarded a technical win (3:0) to Avanhard-2 and a technical loss (0:3) to Tavriya after the Crimean club failed to arrive at the game in Kramatorsk.)	1–1			DNP		DNP	DNP		DNP		DNP	
Chornomorets-2	1–5	0–2		1–1	0–0	1–2	0–2	1–4	0–0	6–1	1–2	DNP			DNP			DNP		DNP		DNP
Enerhiya	0–4	1–1	4–0		0–2	1–3	1–2	3–1	3–1	1–0	2–4	DNP	DNP						DNP		DNP	DNP
Hirnyk	1–2	3–0	4–1	1–0		1–2	3–3	3–1	0–1	3–0	1–0			DNP	DNP		DNP	DNP		DNP		
Krystal	2–0	5–2	2–0	0–2	1–0		4–0	3–0	1–1	2–0	3–2	DNP		DNP	DNP			DNP		DNP		
MFC Mykolaiv-2	0–3	2–1	0–0	1–0	1–2	1–7		0–0	1–1	1–1	1–1	DNP	DNP		DNP						DNP	DNP
FC Nikopol	1–1	1–1	4–1	0–0	0–0	1–2	1–1		1–0	2–0	0–2			DNP		DNP	DNP	DNP		DNP		
Real Pharma	0–5	2–1	0–3	0–0	0–3	0–5	1–0	0–2		0–1	0–2	DNP	DNP		DNP			DNP				DNP
Tavriya	0–2	3–0	1–0	1–1	0–2	1–2	0–2	1–0	1–0		1–2			DNP		DNP	DNP		DNP	DNP		
VPK-Ahro	1–0	4–1	4–0	2–2	5–1	2–0	3–0	3–0	3–1	3–0			DNP			DNP	DNP		DNP		DNP	

Updated to match(es) played on 23 November 2019. Source: pfl.ua (in Ukrainian)
Legend: Blue = home team win; Yellow = draw; Red = away team win.

=== Position by round ===
Team ╲ Round	1	2	3	4	5	6	7	8	9	10	11	12	13	14	15	16	17	18	19	20	21	22	23	24	25	26	27	28	29	30	31	32	33
VPK-Ahro Shevchenkivka	4	2	5	4	4	3	4	3	4	4	3	2	2	2	2	2	2	1	1	1	1	1	–	–	–	–	–	–	–	–	–	–	–
Krystal Kherson	3	5	2	1	1	1	1	1	1	1	1	1	1	1	1	1	1	2	3	3	3	2	–	–	–	–	–	–	–	–	–	–	–
Alians Lypova Dolyna	6	6	6	7	6	6	5	4	2	2	2	3	3	3	3	3	3	3	2	2	2	3	–	–	–	–	–	–	–	–	–	–	–
Hirnyk Kryvyi Rih	1	1	1	2	3	4	3	2	3	3	4	4	4	4	4	4	4	4	4	4	4	4	–	–	–	–	–	–	–	–	–	–	–
Enerhiya Nova Kakhovka	2	4	3	3	2	2	2	5	5	5	6	6	6	6	6	6	5	6	7	5	5	5	–	–	–	–	–	–	–	–	–	–	–
FC Nikopol	8	9	8	9	9	7	7	7	8	8	8	7	7	9	7	7	6	5	5	6	6	6	–	–	–	–	–	–	–	–	–	–	–
MFC Mykolaiv-2	5	3	4	5	5	5	6	6	6	6	5	5	5	5	5	5	7	7	6	7	7	7	–	–	–	–	–	–	–	–	–	–	–
Tavriya Simferopol	10	8	10	6	7	8	8	8	7	7	7	8	9	8	9	10	10	10	8	8	8	8	–	–	–	–	–	–	–	–	–	–	–
Real Pharma Odesa	9	11	9	10	10	10	10	11	11	10	10	10	10	7	8	8	8	8	9	9	9	9	–	–	–	–	–	–	–	–	–	–	–
Avanhard-2 Kramatorsk	7	7	7	8	8	9	9	10	10	11	11	11	11	11	11	11	11	11	11	10	10	10	–	–	–	–	–	–	–	–	–	–	–
Chornomorets-2 Odesa	11	10	11	11	11	11	11	9	9	9	9	9	8	10	10	9	9	9	10	11	11	11	–	–	–	–	–	–	–	–	–	–	–

Updated to match(es) played on 23 November 2019. Source: pfl.ua

=== Top goalscorers ===
As of 24 November 2019

Rank	Scorer	Team	Goals (Pen.)	Games
1	(Ukraine) Andriy Barladym	Krystal Kherson	11	20
2	(Ukraine) Vladyslav Sharay	Alyans Lypova Dolyna	10 (3)	18
3	(Ukraine) Serhiy Mandrovskyi	FC Nikopol	9 (1)	20

=== Number of teams by region (Group B) ===
Number	Region	Team(s)
3	Dnipropetrovsk Oblast	Nikopol, Hirnyk and VPK-Ahro
2	Kherson Oblast	Enerhiya and Krystal
2	Odesa Oblast	Chornomorets-2 and Real Pharma
1	Crimea	Tavriya
1	Donetsk Oblast	Avanhard-2
1	Mykolaiv Oblast	Mykolaiv-2
1	Sumy Oblast	Alians

== Post-season play-offs ==
Following the season's format change approved on 12 June 2020, the decision about the championship game was never mentioned unlike the promotion/relegation play-offs. According to Article 8.4 of the season's regulations, there is expected to be a championship game. No information about the championship game ever appeared.

=== Championship game ===
FC Nyva Ternopil	Cancelled	FC VPK-Ahro Shevchenkivka

== Awards ==
=== Round awards ===
Round	Player			Coach		
Round	Player	Club	Reference	Coach	Club	Reference
Round 1	(Ukraine) Roman Bochak	Enerhiya Nova Kakhovka		(Ukraine) Oleh Fedorchuk	Enerhiya Nova Kakhovka	
Round 2	(Ukraine) Andriy Riznyk	Nyva Ternopil		(Ukraine) Vasyl Malyk	Nyva Ternopil	
Round 3	(Ukraine) Marat Daudov	Polissya Zhytomyr		(Ukraine) Hennadiy Prykhodko	Hirnyk Kryvyi Rih	
Round 4	(Ukraine) Andriy Barladym	Krystal Kherson		(Ukraine) Eduard Khavrov	Krystal Kherson	
Round 5	(Ukraine) Volodymyr Tymenko	Chaika Petropavlivska Borshchahivka		(Ukraine) Vasyl Malyk	Nyva Ternopil	
Round 6	(Ukraine) Serhiy Mandrovskyi	FC Nikopol		(Ukraine) Eduard Khavrov	Krystal Kherson	
Round 7	(Ukraine) Ladik Melkonyan	Bukovyna Chernivtsi		(Ukraine) Hennadiy Prykhodko	Hirnyk Kryvyi Rih	
Round 8	(Ukraine) Illia Tereshchenko	Dinaz Vyshhorod		(Ukraine) Volodymyr Bondarenko	Dinaz Vyshhorod	
Round 9	(Ukraine) Vladyslav Apostoliuk	Krystal Kherson		(Ukraine) Yuriy Yaroshenko	Alians Lypova Dolyna	
Round 10	(Ukraine) Ihor Buka	Hirnyk Kryvyi Rih		(Ukraine) Anatoliy Bezsmertnyi	Polissya Zhytomyr	
Round 11	(Ukraine) Yevhen Zarichnyuk	MFC Mykolaiv-2		(Ukraine) Yuriy Yaroshenko	Alians Lypova Dolyna	
Round 12	(Ukraine) Maryan Mysyk	Veres Rivne		(Ukraine) Taras Ilnytskyi	Chaika Petropavlivska Borshchahivka	
Round 13	(Ukraine) Serhiy Tsoi	Krystal Kherson		(Ukraine) Volodymyr Bondarenko	Dinaz Vyshhorod	
Round 14	(Ukraine) Yuriy Solomka	Veres Rivne		(Ukraine) Serhiy Solovyov	VPK-Ahro Shevchenkivka	
Round 15	(Ukraine) Maksym Bohdanov	FC Nikopol		(Ukraine) Hryhoriy Varzhelenko	FC Nikopol	
Round 16	(Ukraine) Serhiy Zuyevych	Podillya Khmelnytskyi		(Ukraine) Stepan Matviyiv	FC Kalush	
Round 17	(Ukraine) Volodymyr Tymenko	Chaika Petropavlivska Borshchahivka		(Ukraine) Oleh Mazurenko	Obolon-Brovar-2 Bucha	
Round 18	(Ukraine) Vladyslav Sharay	Alians Lypova Dolyna		(Ukraine) Serhiy Solovyov	VPK-Ahro Shevchenkivka	
Round 19	(Ukraine) Artur Zahorulko	Nyva Vinnytsia		(Ukraine) Stepan Makoviychuk	Bukovyna Chernivtsi	
Round 20	(Ukraine) Taras Syvka	Bukovyna Chernivtsi		(Ukraine) Oleh Fedorchuk	Enerhiya Nova Kakhovka	
Round 21	(Ukraine) Andriy Skakun	Nyva Ternopil		(Ukraine) Yuriy Virt	Veres Rivne	
Round 22	(Ukraine) Vladyslav Prylyopa	Chornomorets-2 Odesa		(Ukraine) Eduard Khavrov	Krystal Kherson	

== See also ==
- 2019–20 Ukrainian Premier League
- 2019–20 Ukrainian First League
- 2019–20 Ukrainian Football Amateur League
- 2019–20 Ukrainian Cup
