= Serhiy Mazur =

Ukrainian footballer and manager

Personal information
- Full name: Serhiy Mykolayovych Mazur
- Date of birth: 23 May 1970 (age 56)
- Place of birth: Hirnyk, Donetsk Oblast, Ukrainian SSR, Soviet Union (now Ukraine)
- Height: 1.75 m (5 ft 9 in)
- Position: Midfielder

Team information
- Current team: Kryvbas Kryvyi Rih (vice-president)

Youth career
- Voroshylovhrad boarding school of sports profile

Senior career*
Years	Team	Apps	(Gls)
1987–1991	Shakhtar Donetsk	2	(0)
1991–1993	Kryvbas Kryvyi Rih	70	(7)
1992	→ Zorya-MALS Luhansk (loan)	3	(0)
1994	Sirius Zhovti Vody	2	(0)
1994	Sportinvest Kryvyi Rih	12	(0)
1994	→ Metalurh Kryvyi Rih (loan)	?	(?)
1995	Zakarpattia Uzhhorod	21	(4)
1996	Kryvbas Kryvyi Rih	14	(0)
1996–1997	Spartak Ryazan	11	(1)
1999–2000	Aksess-Golden Greyn Petropavlovsk	30	(4)
2001	Irtysh Pavlodar	6	(0)

Managerial career
- 2008–2012: Kryvbas Kryvyi Rih (U21)
- 2015–2020: Kryvbas Kryvyi Rih
- * Club domestic league appearances and goals

Serhiy Mykolayovych Mazur (Ukrainian: Сергій Миколайович Мазур; born 23 May 1970) is a Ukrainian former footballer and football manager. Currently he is a vice-president of Kryvbas Kryvyi Rih in the Ukrainian Premier League.

== Career ==
He started his football career in the Soviet Union, played for FC Shakhtar Donetsk reserves in 1987 debuting for senior squad in 1990. Having difficult time to make the senior squad, in 1991 Mazur left for FC Kryvbas Kryvyi Rih that played in the Soviet Lower Second League. Following dissolution of the Soviet Union, he played in the very first championship of Ukraine and as a player of Kryvbas was promoted to the Ukrainian Premier League. In 1994 Mazur joined a team from Zhovti Vody for which he played until it went bankrupt. Later for a half a season Mazur played for a team from Carpathian region, but soon return to Kryvbas again. In 1996 he left Ukraine and played abroad in Russia and Kazakhstan.

After retirement in early 2000s, Mazur returned to Kryvbas where he was appointed as a senior coach of its youth team. After Kryvbas went bankrupt, he stayed with the team and in 2015 was appointed as its head coach competing at the Dnipropetrovsk Oblast championship. In fall of 2011 Mazur survived a mass heart attack.

== Personal life ==
He is the twin brother of another professional footballer Vasyl Mazur.
