= Hirnyk Stadium (Kryvyi Rih) =

Stadium in Ukraine

- Hirnyk
- Interactive map of Hirnyk Stadium
- Former names: October Mine Stadium
- Location: Kryvyi Rih, Ukraine
- Coordinates: 47.993864°N 33.43601°E
- Capacity: 3,219
- Surface: Grass
- Field size: 105 m × 67 m (344 ft × 220 ft)

Construction
- Opened: 1956

Tenant
- Kryvbas Kryvyi Rih

Hirnyk Stadium (formerly the October Mine Stadium) is a football stadium in Kryvyi Rih, Ukraine. Until 2020, it was the home arena of the FC Hirnyk Kryvyi Rih. On August 20, 2020, FC Hirnyk was renamed FC Kryvbas, which continues to play at this stadium.

The stadium covers an area of 2.5 hectares, and has a grass pitch with a dimension of 105 m × 67 m. It currently has two stands with a capacity of 3,219.

== History ==
The stadium was first constructed as a multipurpose stadium named October Mine Stadium which opened in 1956. It served as the home ground of FC Hirnyk Kryvyi Rih until 2020, when it became FC Kryvbas Kryvyi Rih. The first of the four floodlight towers was installed in 2021, which provide 400 lux of illumination. The east stand was reconstructed in 2023, another stand was also planned, but it has been frozen due to the ongoing war. A stand behind the goal that can double as a bomb shelter has been proposed. A plan to upgrade the pitch has been delayed, which led to issues of its readiness for use.

== See also ==
- Pokrovska Mine
- Metalurh Stadium (Kryvyi Rih)
