= Kostyantyn Yaroshenko =

Ukrainian footballer (born 1986)

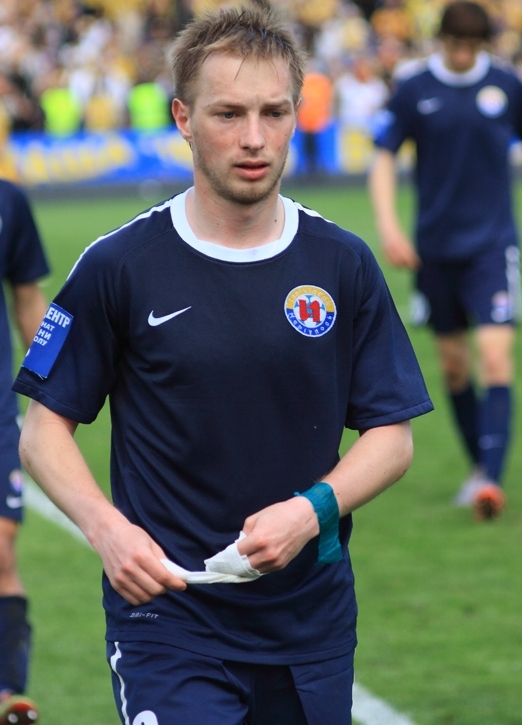

Personal information
- Full name: Kostyantyn Yuriyovych Yaroshenko
- Date of birth: 12 September 1986 (age 40)
- Place of birth: Voroshylovhrad, Ukrainian SSR, Soviet Union
- Height: 1.76 m (5 ft 9 1/2 in)
- Position: Midfielder

Team information
- Current team: Haukar

Youth career
- 1999–2000: Zorya Luhansk
- 2000–2002: Shakhtar Donetsk

Senior career*
Years	Team	Apps	(Gls)
2002–2012	Shakhtar Donetsk	0	(0)
2002–2003	→ Shakhtar-3 Donetsk	14	(1)
2003–2005	→ Shakhtar-2 Donetsk	32	(3)
2005	→ Metalist Kharkiv (loan)	21	(1)
2006–2007	→ Arsenal Kyiv (loan)	34	(4)
2007	→ Chornomorets Odesa (loan)	3	(0)
2008	→ Illichivets Mariupol (loan)	35	(9)
2009	→ Vorskla Poltava (loan)	4	(1)
2009–2012	→ Illichivets Mariupol (loan)	85	(21)
2012–2013	Illichivets Mariupol	23	(3)
2013–2014	Sevastopol	22	(2)
2014–2016	Ural Sverdlovsk Oblast	28	(1)
2016	Karpaty Lviv	5	(0)
2017	Illichivets Mariupol	7	(0)
2017–2018	Kokkolan Palloveikot	29	(7)
2019	Chornomorets Odesa	14	(3)
2020–2022	Alians Lypova Dolyna	42	(9)
2022–2024	Þróttur	56	(8)
2025–	Haukar	18	(2)

International career^{‡}
2001	Ukraine U15	8	(3)
2001–2002	Ukraine U16	9	(3)
2002–2003	Ukraine U17	12	(5)
2004	Ukraine U18	5	(1)
2004–2005	Ukraine U19	11	(3)
2006–2008	Ukraine U21	18	(4)
- * Club domestic league appearances and goals as of 14 October 2026 ‡ National team caps and goals as of 9 March 2018

Kostyantyn Yuriyovych Yaroshenko (Ukrainian: Костянтин Юрійович Ярошенко; born 12 September 1986) is a Ukrainian professional football midfielder who plays for Haukar Hafnarfjörður.

== Career ==
Yaroshenko also played on the Ukraine national under-21 football team where he has scored two goals in the qualification for the under-21 championship in Sweden.

His father Yuriy Yaroshenko also played football.
