= Skidan =

Skidan or Skydan is a surname. Notable people with the surname include:

- Aleksandr Skidan (born 1965), Russian poet and translator
- Hanna Skydan (born 1992), Ukrainian-Azerbaijani hammer thrower
- Hennadiy Skidan (born 1973), retired Ukrainian footballer
- Ruslan Skydan (born 2001), Ukrainian professional footballer
