= Oleh Maik =

Ukrainian footballer

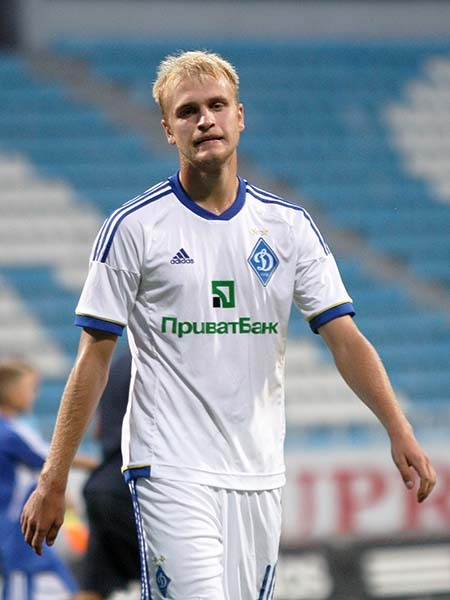
- Oleh Maik with Dynamo Kyiv against - "Chernomorets" 0-1 match. Youth championship. August 24, 2012

Personal information
- Full name: Oleh Vasylyovych Maik
- Date of birth: 23 October 1994 (age 32)
- Place of birth: Dobrotvir, Ukraine
- Height: 1.82 m (6 ft 0 in)
- Position: Striker

Youth career
- 2007–2008: UFK Lviv
- 2009–2010: Lviv

Senior career*
Years	Team	Apps	(Gls)
2011	Lviv	6	(0)
2011–2016	Dynamo Kyiv	0	(0)
2013–2016	→ Dynamo-2 Kyiv	69	(2)
2016–2017	Cherkaskyi Dnipro	12	(0)
2017–2018	Drwęca Nowe Miasto Lubawskie	16	(4)
2018	Kotwica Kołobrzeg	14	(5)
2018–2019	Veres Rivne	24	(4)
2019–2020	Mynai	17	(2)
2021	Kulykiv		
2022–2024	Temp-Dumna Vidnyky		

International career
2011–2012	Ukraine U18	7	(0)
2012	Ukraine U19	3	(0)
2014	Ukraine U20	1	(0)
- * Club domestic league appearances and goals as of 24 October 2024

Oleh Vasylyovych Maik (Ukrainian: Олег Васильович Маїк; born 23 October 1994) is a Ukrainian professional footballer who plays as a striker.

== Career ==
Maik is the product of the Lviv Sportive School. His first coach was Mykola Dudarenko.

He made his debut for the first team in a Ukrainian First League match against Krymteplytsia Molodizhne on 20 March 2011.
