= Maksym Sasovskyi =

Ukrainian footballer

Personal information
- Full name: Maksym Serhiyovych Sasovskyi
- Date of birth: 23 August 2001 (age 25)
- Place of birth: Lutsk, Ukraine
- Height: 1.84 m (6 ft 0 in)
- Position: Centre-back

Team information
- Current team: FC Kulykiv-Bilka (on loan from FC Kolos Kovalivka until 30/6/27)
- Number: 45

Youth career
- 2013–2017: Volyn Lutsk

Senior career*
Years	Team	Apps	(Gls)
2017–2022	Volyn Lutsk	22	(0)
2020–2021	→ Volyn-2 Lutsk	21	(2)
2022–2023	Lviv	12	(0)
2023–26	Viktoriya Sumy	79	(4)
2026-	FC Kolos Kovalivka	0	(0)
2026-	FC Kulykiv-Bilka	13	(1)
- * Club domestic league appearances and goals as of 23/10/26 @ 11:36(AEST)

Maksym Serhiyovych Sasovskyi (Ukrainian: Максим Сергійович Сасовський; born 23 August 2001) is a Ukrainian professional footballer who plays as a centre-back for Ukrainian club Viktoriya Sumy.

Previously he played for Volyn Lutsk.
