= Vladyslav Prylyopa =

Ukrainian footballer

Personal information
- Full name: Vladyslav Romanovych Prylyopa
- Date of birth: 2 March 2000 (age 26)
- Place of birth: Tomakivka, Ukraine
- Height: 1.83 m (6 ft 0 in)
- Position: Centre-forward

Team information
- Current team: Atlantis
- Number: 23

Youth career
- 2014–2015: DVUFK Dnipropetrovsk
- 2015–2017: Premier-Nyva Vinnytsia

Senior career*
Years	Team	Apps	(Gls)
2017–2020	Chornomorets Odesa	0	(0)
2019	→ Chornomorets-2 Odesa	16	(5)
2020–2022	Podillya Khmelnytskyi	29	(1)
2022	Zlinsko	2	(0)
2022	→ TVD Slavicin (loan)		
2023	Alay Osh	11	(3)
2023	Gagra	0	(0)
2024	Alga Bishkek	1	(0)
2024	Kuźnia Ustroń	8	(0)
2025	Alga Bishkek	9	(0)
2026	Toktogul	5	(0)
2026–	Atlantis	3	(2)
- * Club domestic league appearances and goals as of 7 November 2026

Vladyslav Romanovych Prylyopa (Ukrainian: Владислав Романович Прильопа; born 2 March 2000) is a Ukrainian professional footballer who plays as a centre-forward for Finnish club Atlantis.
