= Oleh Rypan =

Ukrainian footballer (born 1972)

Personal information
- Full name: Oleh Pavlovych Rypan
- Date of birth: 28 July 1972 (age 54)
- Height: 1.89 m (6 ft 2 1/2 in)
- Position: Goalkeeper

Team information
- Current team: Prykarpattia Ivano-Frankivsk (manager)

Senior career*
Years	Team	Apps	(Gls)
1992	Beskyd Nadvirna		
1993	Ros Bila Tserkva	19	(0)
1993–1996	Prykarpattia Ivano-Frankivsk	52	(0)
1993	→ Karpaty Mukacheve (loan)	6	(0)
1993	→ Khutrovyk Tysmenytsia (loan)	4	(0)
1996–1997	Rostselmash Rostov-on-Don	11	(0)
1996–1997	→ Rostselmash-2 Rostov-on-Don	11	(0)
1997–1998	Prykarpattia Ivano-Frankivsk	5	(0)
1998–1999	Rostselmash Rostov-on-Don	0	(0)
1998–1999	→ Rostselmash-2 Rostov-on-Don	27	(0)
1999	Dynamo Stavropol	1	(0)
1999–2000	Kremin Kremenchuk	10	(0)
2000	Prykarpattia Ivano-Frankivsk	8	(0)
2000	Chornohora Ivano-Frankivsk	2	(0)
2001–2002	Vorskla Poltava	5	(0)
2001–2002	→ Vorskla-2 Poltava	15	(0)
2002	MFC Mykolaiv	2	(0)
2002–2003	Teplovyk Ivano-Frankivsk		
2003–2004	Tekhno-Center Rohatyn	14	(0)
2004	Podillya Khmelnytskyi	9	(0)
2004–2005	Enerhetyk Burshtyn	11	(0)
2011	Khutrovyk Tysmenytsia		
2012	FC Yaspil Yaseniv-Pilnyi		

Managerial career
- 2008: FC CSCA-Rapid Ghidighici (GK coach)
- 2016–2021: Prykarpattia Ivano-Frankivsk (GK coach)
- 2021–: Prykarpattia Ivano-Frankivsk
- * Club domestic league appearances and goals

Oleh Pavlovych Rypan (Ukrainian: Олег Павлович Рипан; born 28 July 1972) is a former Ukrainian football player.
