= Roman Barchuk =

Ukrainian footballer

Personal information
- Full name: Roman Bohdanovych Barchuk
- Date of birth: 30 January 1990 (age 36)
- Place of birth: Ivano-Frankivsk, Ukraine
- Height: 1.84 m (6 ft 0 in)
- Position: Forward

Team information
- Current team: Prykarpattia Ivano-Frankivsk
- Number: 90

Youth career
- 2002–2003: SDYuSShOR Prykarpattia Ivano-Frankivsk
- 2003–2005: Spartak Ivano-Frankivsk
- 2005: DYuSSh Naftovyk Dolyna
- 2005–2006: Spartak Ivano-Frankivsk
- 2006–2007: SDYuSShOR Prykarpattia Ivano-Frankivsk

Senior career*
Years	Team	Apps	(Gls)
2007	Sokil-Enerhetyk Berezhany (amateurs)	4	(1)
2007–2012	Enerhetyk Burshtyn	81	(11)
2012	Kisva Kosivska Polyana (amateurs)	0	(0)
2012–2013	Hazovyk Bohorodchany (amateurs)	32	(26)
2014	Nika Ivano-Frankivsk (amateurs)	14	(5)
2015	Halychyna-Beskyd Ivano-Frankivsk (amateurs)	10	(6)
2015	Karpaty Halych (amateurs)	10	(8)
2016	Teplovyk Ivano-Frankivsk (amateurs)	18	(14)
2016–2018	Karpaty Halych (amateurs)	42	(41)
2018–	Prykarpattia Ivano-Frankivsk	153	(35)
- * Club domestic league appearances and goals as of 4 June 2026

Roman Bohdanovych Barchuk (Ukrainian: Роман Богданович Барчук; born 30 January 1990) is a Ukrainian professional footballer who plays as a forward for Ukrainian club Prykarpattia Ivano-Frankivsk.
