= Yuriy Yaroshenko =

Ukrainian association football player

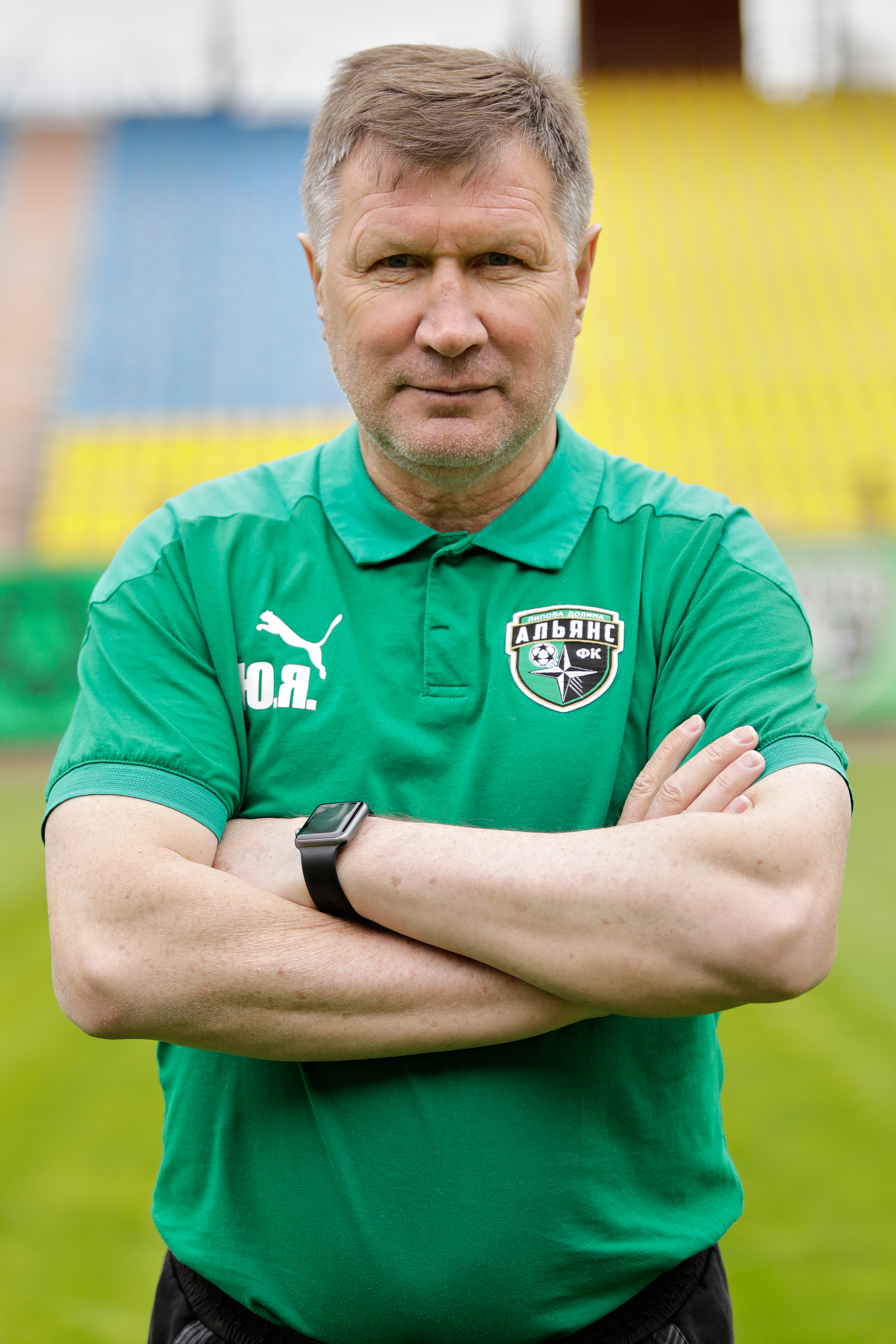

Personal information
- Full name: Yuriy Mykolayovych Yaroshenko
- Date of birth: 5 January 1961 (age 65)
- Place of birth: Frunze, Kyrgyz SSR
- Height: 1.77 m (5 ft 9 1/2 in)
- Positions: Midfielder; forward

Youth career
- Frunze sports school of Olympic reserve
- 1977–1979: Kiev republican sports school

Senior career*
Years	Team	Apps	(Gls)
1982–1990	Zorya Luhansk	316	(47)
1990	Zaria Bălți	22	(0)
1991	Krystal Kherson	24	(0)
1991–1992	Khimik Sieverodonetsk	47	(5)
1992–1993	Tavriya Kherson	19	(2)
1993	Navbahor Namangan	21	(8)
1994	SKA Rostov-on-Don	21	(2)
1994	Dynamo Luhansk	5	(1)
1995	Avia Świdnik		
1995–1996	Avanhard-Industriya Rovenky	1	(0)
1996	→FC Avanhard-Industriya-2 Rovenky (loan)		
1996–1997	Shakhtar Krasnodon	4	(0)
1999	Ellada-Enerhiya Luhansk	3	(0)

Managerial career
- 2001–2003: Shakhtar Donetsk (academy scout)
- 2003–2005: Shakhtar Donetsk (academy coach)
- 2005–2008: Metalurh Donetsk (academy coach)
- 2009–2013: Illichivets Mariupol (academy coach)
- 2013–2014: Barsa Sumy (assistant)
- 2014–2016: Sumy
- 2016–2017: Poltava
- 2017–2018: Mykolaiv (assistant)
- 2018–2022: Alians Lypova Dolyna
- 2023–: Nyva Vinnytsia
- * Club domestic league appearances and goals

Yuriy Yaroshenko (Ukrainian: Юрій Миколайович Ярошенко; born 5 January 1961, in Frunze (today Bishkek), Kyrgyz SSR) is a former Soviet and Ukrainian footballer and Ukrainian football coach.

He has a son Kostyantyn Yaroshenko who plays football.

== Coach career ==
He has been elected * Best Coach of Round 4, Best Coach of Round 7, and Best Coach of Round 8 of Ukrainian First League in the season 2021-22.

== Honours ==
=== As Player ===
Zorya Luhansk

- Soviet Second League: 1986
- Ukrainian SSR: 1986

=== As Coach ===
Individual

- Best Coach of Round 4 of Ukrainian First League: 2021-22
- Best Coach of Round 7 of Ukrainian First League: 2021-22
- Best Coach of Round 8 of Ukrainian First League: 2021-22
