= FC Alians Lypova Dolyna =

Alians Lypova Dolyna
- Full name: Football Club Alians
- Nickname: Alliance
- Founded: 2016
- Dissolved: 2023
- Ground: Alians-Arena, Bairak; Yuvileiny Stadium, Sumy
- Capacity: 520; 25,830
- League: none
- 2021–22: Ukrainian First League, 3rd of 16 (withdrew)
- Website: http://fc-alliance.com.ua/
Home colours	Away colours

Football Club Alians was a Ukrainian football club based in Lypova Dolyna, Sumy Oblast, in north-eastern Ukraine, founded in 2016. The club last competed in the Ukrainian First League following promotion from the 2019–20 Ukrainian Second League. Alians's home field is Yuvileiny Stadium in Sumy.

== History ==
Alians Lypova Dolyna was founded in 2016. The team played its first match on May 21 of the same year within the framework of the Sumy Oblast Championship against Lebedynets from Lebedyn. According to the results of the 2016 season, Alians won gold medals in the championship, ahead of Yavir and Trostianets. Since 2017, the team participated in the highest league of the championship of Sumy Oblast. Alians finished the first draw in third place, and a year later became the champion.

In 2018, Alians was admitted into the Amateur Championship of Ukraine. In its group, the team took third place, skipping ahead of Victoria and LNZ Cherkasy, and in the quarterfinals of the playoffs lost to the future champion VPK Ahro.

In 2019, the club won the Hennady Svirsky Cup and the Super Cup of Sumy Oblast, and in the summer season Alians received the status of a professional club and began playing in the Ukrainian Second League. In the early completed draw of the 2019/20 season, the team took third place in Group B and in the play-offs with Metalurh Zaporizhzhia won addmitance to play in the Ukrainian First League of the 2020/21 season. In its first draw of the Ukrainian Cup, Alliance lost in the quarterfinals to premier league club FC Mariupol with a score of 2:4.

== Honors ==
- Winners (1): 2018

== League and cup history ==
Season	Div.	Pos.	Pl.	W	D	L	GS	GA	P	Domestic Cup	Other	Notes
2018–19	4th "B"	3_{/12}	22	14	4	4	54	22	46			Promoted
2019–20	3rd "B"	3_{/11}	22	17	2	3	54	12	53	1/4 finals		Promoted as play-off winner
2020–21	2nd	6_{/16}	30	14	9	7	46	31	51	1/32 finals		
2021–22	2nd	3_{/16}	19	10	3	6	33	24	33	1/16 finals		Merged with Viktoriya Mykolaivka

== Head coaches ==
- 2018–2022 Yuriy Yaroshenko
- 2022 Anatoliy Bezsmertnyi (came in winter break as part of the upcoming merger and didn't play any competitive games)
