= Hennadiy Prykhodko =

Ukrainian footballer (born 1973)

Personal information
- Full name: Hennadiy Mykolayovych Prykhodko
- Date of birth: 14 August 1973 (age 53)
- Place of birth: Inhulets, Ukrainian SSR, Soviet Union (now part of Kryvyi Rih, Ukraine)
- Height: 1.77 m (5 ft 10 in)
- Position: Midfielder

Senior career*
Years	Team	Apps	(Gls)
1990–1993	Ros Bila Tserkva	81	(2)
1993–1998	Kryvbas Kryvyi Rih	128	(5)
1998–1999	Torpedo Zaporizhzhia	34	(2)
1999	Dnipro Dnipropetrovsk	14	(0)
1999	→ Dnipro-2 Dnipropetrovsk	2	(0)
2000	Zirka Kirovohrad	8	(0)
2000	→ Zirka-2 Kirovohrad	1	(0)
2002–2003	Polihraftekhnika Oleksandriya	13	(0)
2003–2004	Nyva Vinnytsia	33	(3)
2004	Hirnyk Kryvyi Rih	13	(3)
2005	Oleksandria	7	(0)
2007	FC Alhofabryka Kryvyi Rih	4	(2)
2007	FC Sevash Dnipropetrovsk	10	(8)
2008	FC Mittal Kryvyi Rih	2	(0)
Total		350	(25)

Managerial career
- 2010–2020: Hirnyk Kryvyi Rih
- 2020–2021: Kryvbas Kryvyi Rih
- * Club domestic league appearances and goals

Hennadiy Prykhodko (Ukrainian: Геннадій Миколайович Приходько; born 14 August 1973) is a Ukrainian football manager and former player.

== Career ==
A midfielder, Prykhodko started his football career in the Soviet Union, played for Ros Bila Tserkva in 1990 in the Soviet Second League B, then played in some Ukrainian teams of different leagues. He retired in 2005 as a professional and in 2008 as an amateur player.

== Personal life ==
Prykhodko is the father of the Ukrainian footballer Klim Prykhodko.
