= 2016–17 FC Volyn Lutsk season =

Volyn Lutsk
2016-17 season
- President: Vitaliy Kvartsyanyi
- Manager: Vitaliy Kvartsyanyi
- Stadium: Avanhard Stadium
- Ukrainian Premier League: 12th (relegated)
- Ukrainian Cup: Round of 16 (1/8)
- Top goalscorer: League: Serhiy Petrov (4); All: Serhiy Petrov (4)
Home colours	Away colours

The 2016–17 season was 16th season in the top Ukrainian football league for Volyn Lutsk. Volyn competed in Premier League and in the Ukrainian Cup. On May 12, 2017 Football Federation of Ukraine deducted six points from Volyn in order to implement the decision of FIFA Disciplinary Committee of 15 March 2017. The club was penalized for failing to clear their debts with former player Saša Stević. As a result, club lost all chances to stay in Premier League three matchdays ahead of season finish and was relegated to Ukrainian First League.

== Players ==
=== Squad information ===
Squad no.	Name	Nationality	Position	Date of birth (age)
Goalkeepers
1	Artem Kychak	(Ukraine)	GK	16 May 1989 (age 37)
42	Vitaliy Nedilko	(Ukraine)	GK	21 August 1982 (age 44)
73	Andriy Marchuk ^{List B}	(Ukraine)	GK	25 June 1997 (age 29)
84	Roman Zhmurko ^{List B}	(Ukraine)	GK	27 July 1997 (age 29)
Defenders
18	Serhiy Lohinov	(Ukraine)	DF	7 March 1992 (age 34)
22	Vladyslav Shapoval ^{List B}	(Ukraine)	DF	5 August 1995 (age 31)
24	Miha Goropevšek	(Slovenia)	DF	12 March 1991 (age 35)
26	Roman Nykytyuk	(Ukraine)	DF	9 September 1993 (age 32)
58	Oleh Trakalo ^{List B}	(Ukraine)	DF	14 February 1998 (age 28)
61	Roman Babyak ^{List B}	(Ukraine)	DF	28 February 1998 (age 28)
67	Serhiy Melinyshyn ^{List B}	(Ukraine)	DF	23 August 1998 (age 28)
80	Ruslan Marushka ^{List B}	(Ukraine)	DF	26 May 1997 (age 29)
92	Denys Omelchuk ^{List B}	(Ukraine)	DF	18 December 1996 (age 29)
Midfielders
7	Oleh Herasymyuk	(Ukraine)	MF	25 September 1986 (age 39)
20	Dmytro Zaderetskyi	(Ukraine)	MF	3 August 1994 (age 32)
25	Andriy Nykytyuk	(Ukraine)	MF	16 August 1994 (age 32)
47	Yuriy Romanyuk ^{List B}	(Ukraine)	MF	6 May 1997 (age 29)
48	Oleksandr Chepelyuk ^{List B}	(Ukraine)	MF	5 September 1997 (age 29)
50	Roman Shandruk ^{List B}	(Ukraine)	MF	29 May 1998 (age 28)
51	Dmytro Lozin ^{List B}	(Ukraine)	MF	20 January 1997 (age 29)
54	Serhiy Trykosh ^{List B}	(Ukraine)	MF	12 October 1998 (age 27)
65	Roman Ilnytskyi ^{List B}	(Ukraine)	MF	30 January 1998 (age 28)
65	Yuriy Teterenko ^{List B}	(Ukraine)	MF	22 January 1997 (age 29)
72	Myroslav Deda ^{List B}	(Ukraine)	MF	28 May 1999 (age 27)
76	Andriy Lyashenko ^{List B}	(Ukraine)	MF	11 June 1998 (age 28)
86	Yevhen Kotyun ^{List B}	(Ukraine)	MF	31 July 1996 (age 30)
Forwards
9	Redvan Memeshev	(Ukraine)	FW	15 August 1993 (age 33)
38	Serhiy Petrov ^{List B}	(Ukraine)	FW	21 May 1997 (age 29)
59	Yaroslav Deda ^{List B}	(Ukraine)	FW	28 May 1999 (age 27)
78	Vladyslav Dmytrenko ^{List B}	(Ukraine)	FW	24 May 2000 (age 26)
79	Bohdan Hladun ^{List B}	(Ukraine)	FW	10 June 1999 (age 27)
97	Artem Dudik ^{List B}	(Ukraine)	FW	2 January 1997 (age 29)
99	Anatoliy Didenko (Captain)	(Ukraine)	FW	9 June 1982 (age 44)

== Transfers ==
=== In ===
Date	Pos.	Player	Age	Moving from	Type	Fee	Source
31 May 2016	MF	(Ukraine) Dmytro Zaderetskyi	22	(Ukraine) Desna Chernihiv	Loan return		

=== Out ===
Date	Pos.	Player	Age	Moving to	Type	Fee	Source
Summer
11 June 2016	DF	(Ukraine) Vitaliy Pryndeta	23	(Greece) Platanias	Transfer	Undisclosed	
6 July 2016	DF	(Croatia) Ivica Žunić	28	(Russia) FC Orenburg	Transfer	Free	
21 July 2016	GK	(Ukraine) Bohdan Shust	30	(Ukraine) Vorskla Poltava	Transfer	Undisclosed	
18 August 2016	MF	(Ukraine) Oleh Humenyuk	33	(Autonomous Republic of Crimea) TSK-Tavriya Simferopol	Transfer	Free	
18 August 2016	MF	(Ukraine) Andriy Bohdanov	26	(Ukraine) Olimpik Donetsk	Transfer	Undisclosed	
18 August 2016	FW	(Ukraine) Dmytro Kozban	27	(Ukraine) Veres Rivne	Transfer	Undisclosed	
31 May 2016	DF	(Ukraine) Volodymyr Polyovyi	31	(Ukraine) Dnipro	Loan return		
31 May 2016	MF	(Ukraine) Serhiy Kravchenko	33	(Ukraine) Dnipro	Loan return		
Winter
27 January 2017	DF	(Ukraine) Artem Shabanov	24	(Ukraine) Stal Kamianske	Transfer	Undisclosed	
31 January 2017	FW	(Ukraine) Viktor Khomchenko	22	(Ukraine) Karpaty Lviv	Transfer	Undisclosed	

== Pre-season and friendlies ==
29 June 2016 Friendly	Karpaty Lviv (Ukraine)	0–1	(Ukraine) Volyn Lutsk	Lviv
17:00 EEST (UTC+03:00)		Report	Didenko 24'	Stadium: Ukraina Stadium

5 July 2016 Friendly	NK Maribor (Slovenia)	0–2	(Ukraine) Volyn Lutsk	Maribor, Slovenia
17:00 EEST (UTC+03:00)		Report	Memeshev 14'; Dovbyk 56'	Stadium: NK Maribor train base

6 July 2016 Friendly	Sturm Graz (Austria)	2–1	(Ukraine) Volyn Lutsk	Graz, Austria
18:00 EEST (UTC+03:00)		Report		Stadium: Messendorf train base

11 July 2016 Friendly	Volyn Lutsk (Ukraine)	3–2	(Czech Republic) Slovan Liberec	Windischgarsten, Austria
17:30 EEST (UTC+03:00)		Report		Stadium: Windischgarsten train base

12 July 2016 Friendly	Volyn Lutsk (Ukraine)	3–1	(Saudi Arabia) Al-Nassr FC	Sveti Martin na Muri, Croatia
19:00 EEST (UTC+03:00)		Report		Stadium: SPA Golfer hotel

14 July 2016 Friendly	Volyn Lutsk (Ukraine)	0–4	(Romania) Viitorul Constanța	Radenci, Slovenia
17:30 EEST (UTC+03:00)		Report		Stadium: Radein hotel

18 July 2016 Friendly	Veres Rivne (Ukraine)	1–1	(Ukraine) Volyn Lutsk	Rivne
18:00 EEST (UTC+03:00)	Ralyuchenko 74'	Report	Goropevšek 67'	Stadium: Avanhard Stadium

4 September 2016 Friendly	ODEK Orzhiv (Ukraine)	1–2	(Ukraine) Volyn Lutsk	Orzhiv
15:00 EEST (UTC+03:00)		Report		Stadium: ODEK

25 January 2017 Friendly	Volyn Lutsk (Ukraine)	2–0	(Ukraine) MFC Mykolaiv	Kamianytsia
13:30 EET (UTC+02:00)	Petrov 62'; Didenko 82'	Report		Stadium: SGK "Kmelot"

28 January 2017 Friendly	Volyn Lutsk (Ukraine)	4–0	(Slovenia) Zemplín Michalovce	Kamianytsia
13:00 EET (UTC+02:00)	Didenko 33', 84'; Dudik 78'; Mohil 85'	Report		Stadium: SGK "Kmelot"

29 January 2017 Friendly	Volyn Lutsk (Ukraine)	3–0	(Ukraine) Syvlyush Vynohradiv	Kamianytsia
13:00 EET (UTC+02:00)	Goropevšek 15'; Shandruk 82'; Mohil 90'	Report		Stadium: SGK "Kmelot"

31 January 2017 Friendly	Volyn Lutsk (Ukraine)	Cancelled	(Ukraine) FC Lviv
EET (UTC+02:00)		[ Report]

8 February 2017 Friendly	Volyn Lutsk (Ukraine)	Cancelled	(North Macedonia) Akademija Pandev	Turkey
EET (UTC+02:00)		Report

8 February 2017 Friendly	Volyn Lutsk (Ukraine)	1–2	(Uzbekistan) Olmaliq FK	Antalya, Turkey
16:00 EET (UTC+02:00)	Goropevšek 75'	Report	Klishin 15'; Isaev 73'	Stadium: Topkani palace

11 February 2017 Friendly	Volyn Lutsk (Ukraine)	2–1	(Uzbekistan) Metallurg Bekabad	Antalya, Turkey
16:00 EET (UTC+02:00)	Dudik 58'; Oleh Marchuk 81'	Report	Goal	Stadium: Topkani palace

12 February 2017 Friendly	Volyn Lutsk (Ukraine)	1–4	(Ukraine) Desna Chernihiv	Antalya, Turkey
16:00 EET (UTC+02:00)	Mohil	Report	Bovtruk; Halenkov	Stadium: Topkani palace

14 February 2017 Friendly	Volyn Lutsk (Ukraine)	0–4	(Georgia (country)) Dinamo Tbilisi	Antalya, Turkey
16:00 EET (UTC+02:00)		Report	Papunashvili 9'; Kvernadze 65', 66'; Mikeltadze 73'	Stadium: Kanya resort

16 February 2017 Friendly	Volyn Lutsk (Ukraine)	2–1	(Denmark) Vejle Boldklub	Antalya, Turkey
16:00 EET (UTC+02:00)	Dudik 31'; Didenko 53'	Report	58'	Stadium: Topkani Palace

18 February 2017 Friendly	Volyn Lutsk (Ukraine)	0–2	(Poland) GKS Katowice	Antalya, Turkey
15:30 EET (UTC+02:00)		Report	Zejdler 54'; Prokić 74'	Stadium: Topkani Palace

19 February 2017 Friendly	Volyn Lutsk (Ukraine)	1–2	(Kazakhstan) Irtysh Pavlodar	Belek, Turkey
16:00 EET (UTC+02:00)	Dudik 26'	Report	37'; 57'	Stadium: Bellis Deluxe

== Competitions ==
=== Overall ===
Competition	Started round	Final position	First match	Last match
Premier League	Matchday 1	12th	24 July 2016	31 May 2017
Cup	Round of 20	Round of 16	21 September 2016	26 October 2016

Last updated:

=== Premier League ===
==== League table ====
Pos	Team	Pld	W	D	L	GF	GA	GD	Pts	Qualification or relegation
7	Vorskla Poltava (Note: Vorskla Poltava was awarded the UPL Prestige Trophy for winning the consolation tournament.)	32	11	9	12	32	32	0	42	
8	Stal Kamianske	32	11	8	13	27	31	−4	41	
9	Zirka Kropyvnytskyi	32	9	7	16	29	43	−14	34	
10	Karpaty Lviv (Note: Karpaty Lviv was deducted six points according to a decision by FIFA Disciplinary Committee on 4 March 2016.)	32	9	9	14	35	41	−6	30	
11	FC Dnipro (Note: FC Dnipro was deducted a total of 24 points (six points by the FIFA Disciplinary Committee for failing to clear their debts with former coach Juande Ramos and his assistants, six points by the Ukrainian Premier League for failing to comply with the decision of FIFA Disciplinary Committee to pay debts to former player Danilo Sousa Campos, three more points by the FFU Control and Disciplinary Committee for failing execute one of the decisions of the committee, and 9 more points on 9 June 2017, after the end of the tournament.). On the decision of FIFA, FFU enforced relegation of FC Dnipro straight to the Second League, skipping the First League. In a near future FFU will adopt a decision which team will be replacing Dnipro in the First League.) (R)	32	8	13	11	31	40	−9	13	Relegation to Ukrainian Second League
12	Volyn Lutsk (Note: Volyn Lutsk was deducted six points on the request of Football Federation of Ukraine which received a letter from the FIFA Disciplinary Committee on 11 May 2017 urging to implement its decision of 15 March 2017, due to debts with former player Saša Stević.) (R)	32	4	4	24	17	51	−34	10	Relegation to Ukrainian First League

Source: UEFA, Ukrainian Premier League, Soccerway
Rules for classification: 1) Points; 2) Goal difference; 3) Goals scored; 4) Head-to-head points; 5) Head-to-head goal difference; 6) Head-to-head goals scored; 7) Draw.
(R) Relegated

==== Results summary ====
Overall								Home						Away					
Pld	W	D	L	GF	GA	GD	Pts	W	D	L	GF	GA	GD	W	D	L	GF	GA	GD
31	3	4	24	14	51	−37	13	3	3	10	10	17	−7	0	1	14	4	34	−30

Last updated: 27 May 2017.
Source: Competitive matches

==== Results by round ====
Round	1	2	3	4	5	6	7	8	9	10	11	12	13	14	15	16	17	18	19	20	21	22	23	24	25	26	27	28	29	30	31	32
Ground	A	H	A	H	A	H	A	H	A	H	A	H	A	H	A	H	A	H	A	H	A	H	A	A	H	A	H	H	H	A	H	A
Result	L	D	L	W	L	L	L	D	L	D	L	W	L	L	L	L	D	L	L	L	L	L	L	L	W	L	L	L	L	L	L	P
Position	11	10	10	8	10	10	10	11	11	11	11	11	10	10	10	10	11	10	10	10	11	12	12	12	11	12	12	12	12	12	12	12

Updated to match(es) played on 31 May 2017. Source: Competitive matches
A = Away; H = Home; W = Win; D = Draw; L = Loss

==== Matches ====
24 July 2016 1	Dnipro	5–0	Volyn Lutsk	Dnipro
19:30 EEST (UTC+03:00)	Balanyuk 5', 21'; Kohut 15', (yellow card) 22'; Vakulko 85'; Kocherhin 90'	Report	Shapoval (yellow card) 41'; Lyashenko (yellow card) 90'	Stadium: Dnipro-Arena; Attendance: 7,163; Referee: Olexandr Derdo

30 July 2016 2	Volyn Lutsk	2–2	Olimpik Donetsk	Lutsk
17:00 EEST (UTC+03:00)	Khomchenko 19'; Goropevšek (yellow card) 28'; Herasymyuk 57'; Shapoval (yellow card) 63'; Chepelyuk (yellow card) 90+4'	Report	Partsvania (yellow card) 6'; Postupalenko 72', (yellow card) 90+5'; Petrov 90+6', (yellow card) 90+6'	Stadium: Avanhard Stadium; Attendance: 3,400; Referee: Yuriy Hryso

6 August 2016 3	Stal Kamianske	1–0	Volyn Lutsk	Dnipro
17:00 EEST (UTC+03:00)	Deul 12'	Report	Zaderetskyi (yellow card) 45'; Shabanov (yellow card) (yellow-red card) 65'; Shapoval (yellow card) 68'; Bohdanov (yellow card) 78'	Stadium: Meteor Stadium; Attendance: 700; Referee: Olexandr Holovkov

13 August 2016 4	Volyn Lutsk	1–0	Zirka Kropyvnytskyi	Lutsk
17:00 EEST (UTC+03:00)	Khomchenko (yellow card) 40'; Bayenko 73' (o.g.)	Report	Havrysh (yellow card) 49'; Batsula (yellow card) 90+2'	Stadium: Avanhard Stadium; Attendance: 2,100; Referee: Yuriy Mozharovsky

20 August 2016 5	Dynamo Kyiv	2–1	Volyn Lutsk	Kyiv
19:30 EEST (UTC+03:00)	Sydorchuk (yellow card) 6'; Antunes (yellow card) 39'; Morozyuk 53'; Harmash 61', (yellow card) 64'	Report	Goropevšek (yellow card) 15'; Herasymyuk (yellow card) 39'; Petrov 38'; Zaderetskyi (yellow card) 41'; Chepelyuk (yellow card) 69'	Stadium: NSC Olimpiyskiy; Attendance: 8,246; Referee: Ihor Paskhal

27 August 2016 6	Volyn Lutsk	0–1	Chornomorets Odesa	Lutsk
17:00 EEST (UTC+03:00)	Romanyuk (yellow card) 37' (yellow-red card) 47'	Report	Smirnov (yellow card) 24'; Korkishko (yellow card) 33'; Tatarkov (yellow card) 66'; Kabayev 90+1'	Stadium: Avanhard Stadium; Attendance: 1,750; Referee: Ivan Bondar

11 September 2016 7	Vorskla Poltava	2–1	Volyn Lutsk	Poltava
17:00 EEST (UTC+03:00)	Khlyobas 20'; Chesnakov (yellow card) 36'; Tursunov 74'	Report	Didenko 26'; Khomchenko (yellow card) 35'; Goropevšek (yellow card) 72'; Shabanov (yellow card) 85'	Stadium: Vorskla Stadium; Attendance: 5,700; Referee: Serhiy Boyko

18 September 2016 8	Volyn Lutsk	1–1	FC Oleksandriya	Lutsk
14:00 EEST (UTC+03:00)	Petrov 28'; Herasymyuk (yellow card) 45+1'; Goropevšek (yellow card) 67'; Khomchenko (yellow card) 72'; Andriy Nykytyuk (yellow card) 90+5'	Report	Ohirya (yellow card) 39'; Polyarus 90+1'	Stadium: Avanhard Stadium; Attendance: 2,100; Referee: Serhiy Berezka

24 September 2016 9	Shakhtar Donetsk	3–0	Volyn Lutsk	Lviv
17:00 EEST (UTC+03:00)	Kychak 41' (o.g.); Ordets 60'; Boryachuk 78'	Report	Herasymyuk (yellow card) 57'	Stadium: Arena Lviv; Attendance: 1,678; Referee: Kateryna Monzul

2 October 2016 10	Volyn Lutsk	1–1	Karpaty Lviv	Lutsk
14:00 EEST (UTC+03:00)	Memeshev (yellow card) 33'; Petrov 45+2'; Goropevšek (yellow card) 48'; Didenko (yellow card) 56'; Herasymyuk (yellow card) 83'; Chepelyuk (yellow card) 89'	Report	Yaroshenko (yellow card) 18'; Khudobyak 60'	Stadium: Avanhard Stadium; Attendance: 4,600; Referee: Oleksandr Holovkov

15 October 2016 11	Zorya Luhansk	2–0	Volyn Lutsk	Zaporizhia
17:00 EEST (UTC+03:00)	Kulach 39'; Rafael Forster 42' (pen.)	Report	Roman Nykytyuk (yellow card) 19'; Chepelyuk (yellow card) 45'; Romanyuk (yellow card) 59'	Stadium: Slavutych-Arena; Attendance: 950; Referee: Yuriy Hryso

22 October 2016 12	Volyn Lutsk	3–0	Dnipro	Lutsk
19:30 EEST (UTC+03:00)	Memeshev 26'; Dudik 55'; Petrov (yellow card) 65'; Shabanov (yellow card) 71'; Shapoval 86'; Marushka (yellow card) 90+4'	Report	Kohut (yellow card) 54'	Stadium: Avanhard Stadium; Attendance: 1,280; Referee: Olexandr Ivanov

29 October 2016 13	Olimpik Donetsk	2–1	Volyn Lutsk	Sumy
14:00 EEST (UTC+03:00)	Postupalenko 32'; Hryshko 52'; Tanchyk (yellow card) 77'; Partsvania (yellow card) 90+3'	Report	Dudik 27'; Lohinov (yellow card) 58'; Romanyuk (yellow card) 67'; Melinyshyn (yellow card) 90+4'	Stadium: Yuvileiny Stadium; Attendance: 560; Referee: Mykola Balakin

5 November 2016 14	Volyn Lutsk	0–1	Stal Kamianske	Lutsk
17:00 EET (UTC+02:00)	Romanyuk (red card) 52'; Khomchenko (yellow card) 55'	Report	Comvalius 22'; Mysyk (yellow card) 32'; Voronin (yellow card) 73'	Stadium: Avanhard Stadium; Attendance: 0 Referee: Olexandr Derdo

20 November 2016 15	Zirka Kropyvnytskyi	2–0	Volyn Lutsk	Kropyvnytskyi
17:00 EET (UTC+02:00)	Favorov 59'; Bilonoh 73'	Report	Petrov (yellow card) 2'; Didenko (yellow card) 36'; Shapoval (yellow card) 70'; Shandruk (yellow card) 83'	Stadium: Zirka Stadium; Attendance: 1,554; Referee: Yaroslav Kozyk

26 November 2016 16	Volyn Lutsk	1–4	Dynamo Kyiv	Lutsk
19:30 EEST (UTC+03:00)	Didenko 6'; Chepelyuk (yellow card) 12'; Roman Nykytyuk (yellow card) 89'	Report	Moraes 20', 71', 90+3'; Yarmolenko 45'	Stadium: Avanhard Stadium; Attendance: 0 Referee: Yuriy Hryso

3 December 2016 17	Chornomorets Odesa	0–0	Volyn Lutsk	Odesa
14:00 EET (UTC+02:00)	Khocholava (yellow card) 30'; Kalitvintsev (yellow card) 33'	Report	Melinyshyn (yellow card) 16'; Romanyuk (yellow card) 37'; Memeshev (yellow card) 73'	Stadium: Chornomorets Stadium; Attendance: 2,282; Referee: Kateryna Monzul

10 December 2016 18	Volyn Lutsk	0–1	Vorskla Poltava	Lutsk
14:00 EEST (UTC+03:00)	Memeshev (yellow card) 53'; Andriy Nykytyuk (yellow card) 90'	Report	Sapay (yellow card) 41'; Odaryuk 50'; Kravchenko (yellow card) 59'	Stadium: Avanhard Stadium; Attendance: 870; Referee: Serhiy Berezka

25 February 2017 19	FC Oleksandriya	6–0	Volyn Lutsk	Oleksandriya
17:00 EET (UTC+02:00)	Hrytsuk 15' (pen.); Kulish 27', 70', 88', 90+2'; Zaderetskyi 45+2' (o.g.)	Report	Didenko (yellow card) 44' (yellow-red card) 75'; Chepelyuk (yellow card) 45+1'; Zaderetskyi (yellow card) 79'	Stadium: CSC Nika; Attendance: 2,114; Referee: Mykola Kryvonosov

4 March 2017 20	Volyn Lutsk	0–1	Shakhtar Donetsk	Lutsk
19:30 EEST (UTC+03:00)	Lyashenko (yellow card) 32'; Shapoval (yellow card) 37'	Report	Kovalenko 66'; Rakitskiy (yellow card) 71'	Stadium: Avanhard Stadium; Attendance: 7,450; Referee: Serhiy Berezka

11 March 2017 21	Karpaty Lviv	2–1	Volyn Lutsk	Lviv
17:00 EEST (UTC+03:00)	Klyots (yellow card) 13'; Hladkyi 18'; Khudobyak 53'; Borovyk (yellow card) 90+5'	Report	Romanyuk (yellow card) 24'; Didenko (yellow card) 25'; Shapoval (yellow card) 41'; Dudik 87'	Stadium: Arena Lviv; Attendance: 3,522; Referee: Oleksandr Ivanov

19 March 2017 22	Volyn Lutsk	0–1	Zorya Luhansk	Lutsk
14:00 EEST (UTC+03:00)	Shapoval (yellow card) 6'; Goropevšek (yellow card) 8'; Teterenko (yellow card) 45'; Roman Nykytyuk (yellow card) 90'	Report	Sobol (yellow card) 59'; Rafael Forster 90' (pen.)	Stadium: Avanhard Stadium; Attendance: 1,200; Referee: Anatoliy Zhabchenko

1 April 2017 23	Vorskla Poltava	2–0	Volyn Lutsk	Poltava
17:00 EEST (UTC+03:00)	Rebenok (yellow card) 18'; Chyzhov (yellow card) 27'; Sharpar 34', (yellow card) 45'; Khlyobas 62'	Report	Goropevšek (yellow card) 9'; Roman Nykytyuk (yellow card) 90+2'	Stadium: Vorskla Stadium; Attendance: 1,029; Referee: Ihor Kaskhal

8 April 2017 24	Stal Kamianske	2–0	Volyn Lutsk	Dnipro
14:00 EEST (UTC+03:00)	Kalenchuk (yellow card) 83'; Karikari 87', 90+4'	Report	Memeshev (yellow card) 29'; Petrov (yellow card) 38'; Zaderetskyi (yellow card) 82'	Stadium: Meteor Stadium; Attendance: 350; Referee: Yehven Aranovsky

16 April 2017 25	Volyn Lutsk	1–0	Zirka Kropyvnytskyi	Lutsk
14:00 EEST (UTC+03:00)	Roman Nykytyuk (yellow card) 2'; Petrov 32'; Didenko (yellow card) 40'; Zaderetskyi (yellow card) 75'; Chepelyuk (yellow card) 82'; Kychak (yellow card) 90+4'	Report	Bilonoh (yellow card) 48' (yellow-red card) 67'; Zahalskyi (yellow card) 50'; Fatyeyev (yellow card) 90+3'	Stadium: Avanhard Stadium; Attendance: 1,506; Referee: Vitaliy Romanov

22 April 2017 26	Karpaty Lviv	1–0	Volyn Lutsk	Lviv
17:00 EEST (UTC+03:00)	Hutsulyak 17'; Dytyatev (yellow card) 90'	Report	Lohinov (yellow card) 22'; Kychak (yellow card) 27'; Herasymyuk (yellow card) 45'; Roman Nykytyuk (yellow card) 56'; Teterenko (yellow card) 87'; Romanyuk (yellow card) 90+1'; Melinyshyn (yellow card) 90+3'; Shapoval (yellow card) 90+5'	Stadium: Arena Lviv; Attendance: 3.246; Referee: Anatoliy Zhabchenko

30 April 2017 27	Volyn Lutsk	0–1	Dnipro	Lutsk
14:00 EEST (UTC+03:00)	Goropevšek (yellow card) 11'; Memeshev (yellow card) 54'; Teterenko (yellow card) 83'; Shapoval (yellow card) 90+3'	Report	Polyovyi (yellow card) 32'; Kohut (yellow card) 42'; Adamyuk (yellow card) 67'; Cheberko 90' (pen.)	Stadium: Avanhard Stadium; Attendance: 1,222; Referee: Kostyantyn Truhanov

5 May 2017 28	Volyn Lutsk	0–1	Vorskla Poltava	Lutsk
19:00 EEST (UTC+03:00)	Roman Nykytyuk (yellow card) 45+1'; Herasymyuk (yellow card) 58'	Report	Sklyar (yellow card) 21'; Myakushko 24'; Chyzhov (yellow card) 40'; Dallku (yellow card) 78'; Khlyobas (yellow card) 86'; Sakiv (yellow card) 90+3'	Stadium: Avanhard Stadium; Attendance: 1,123; Referee: Oleksandr Ivanov

12 May 2017 29	Volyn Lutsk	0–1	Stal Kamianske	Lutsk
19:00 EEST (UTC+03:00)	Lohinov (yellow card) 24' (yellow-red card); Goropevšek (yellow card) 35'; Chepelyuk (yellow card) 71'; Romanyuk (yellow card) 87'	Report	Debelko 18'; Kalenchuk (yellow card) 43'; Shabanov (yellow card) 47'; Stamenković (yellow card) 60'; Ischenko (yellow card) 90+4'	Stadium: Avanhard Stadium; Attendance: 1,120; Referee: Ihor Paskhal

20 May 2017 30	Zirka Kropyvnytskyi	2–0	Volyn Lutsk	Kropyvnytskyi
14:00 EEST (UTC+03:00)	Eseola (yellow card) 21', (goal) 68'; Drachenko (yellow card) 77'; Sitalo 82'	Report	Marushka (yellow card) 42'; Goropevšek (yellow card) 45+1'; Kotyun (yellow card) 45+3'; Ilnytskyi (yellow card) 48'; Lyashenko (yellow card) 56'	Stadium: Zirka Stadium; Attendance: 1,966; Referee: Oleksandr Ivanov

27 May 2017 31	Volyn Lutsk	0–1	Karpaty Lviv	Lviv
17:00 EEST (UTC+03:00)	Marchuk (yellow card) 28'; Melinyshyn (yellow card) 30'	Report	Khudobyak (yellow card) 29'; Verbnyi (yellow card) 32'; Hutsulyak 37'; Chachua (yellow card) 45+4'; Holodyuk (yellow card) 53'	Stadium: Ukraina Stadium; Attendance: 4,500; Referee: Yevhen Aranovskyi

31 May 2017 32	Dnipro	1–0 ^{(1)}	Volyn Lutsk	Dnipro
17:00 EEST (UTC+03:00)	Dovbyk 32'	Report		Stadium: Dnipro-Arena; Referee: Ivan Bondar

Notes:

- ^(1) Match was not finished due to the fans behavior after fire landed near the referee.

=== Ukrainian Cup ===
20 September 2016 Round of 20 (1/16)	Volyn Lutsk	2–1	Olimpik Donetsk	Lutsk
19:00 EEST (UTC+03:00)	Romanyuk (yellow card) 36'; Herasymyuk (yellow card) 38'; Lohinov 65'; Deda 82'; Shabanov (yellow card) 83'; Kychak (yellow card) 90+3'	Report	Partsvania (yellow card) 31'; Fedoriv (yellow card) 54'; Doronin (yellow card) 64'; Hryn 67'	Stadium: Avanhard Stadium; Attendance: 1,280; Referee: Serhiy Skrypak

26 October 2016 Round of 16 (1/8)	Naftovyk-Ukrnafta Okhtyrka	2–1	Volyn Lutsk	Okhtyrka
18:00 EEST (UTC+03:00)	Yevhen Pasich 17'; Hennadiy Pasich 67'	Report	Lohinov (yellow card) 36'; Dudik (yellow card) 45'; Zaderetskyi (yellow card) 57'; Memeshev 86' (pen.); Romanyuk (yellow card) 90+5'	Stadium: Naftovyk Stadium; Attendance: 3,150; Referee: Anatoliy Abdula

== Statistics ==
=== Appearances and goals ===
No.	Pos	Nat	Player	Total		Premier League		Cup	
No.	Pos	Nat	Player	Apps	Goals	Apps	Goals	Apps	Goals
Goalkeepers
1	GK	(Ukraine) UKR	Artem Kychak	18	0	17	0	1	0
42	GK	(Ukraine) UKR	Vitaliy Nedilko	8	0	7	0	1	0
73	GK	(Ukraine) UKR	Andriy Marchuk	7	0	7	0	0	0
84	GK	(Ukraine) UKR	Roman Zhmurko	1	0	1	0	0	0
Defenders
18	DF	(Ukraine) UKR	Serhiy Lohinov	24	1	22	0	2	1
22	DF	(Ukraine) UKR	Vladyslav Shapoval	27	1	23+2	1	1+1	0
24	DF	(Slovenia) SVN	Miha Goropevšek	24	0	18+4	0	2	0
26	DF	(Ukraine) UKR	Roman Nykytyuk	21	0	21	0	0	0
58	DF	(Ukraine) UKR	Oleh Trakalo	2	0	1+1	0	0	0
61	DF	(Ukraine) UKR	Roman Babyak	2	0	1+1	0	0	0
67	DF	(Ukraine) UKR	Serhiy Melinyshyn	10	0	6+4	0	0	0
80	DF	(Ukraine) UKR	Ruslan Marushka	5	0	4+1	0	0	0
Midfielders
7	MF	(Ukraine) UKR	Oleh Herasymyuk	23	0	21	0	2	0
20	MF	(Ukraine) UKR	Dmytro Zaderetskyi	28	1	16+10	1	1+1	0
25	MF	(Ukraine) UKR	Andriy Nykytyuk	13	0	2+10	0	0+1	0
47	MF	(Ukraine) UKR	Yuriy Romanyuk	30	0	26+2	0	2	0
48	MF	(Ukraine) UKR	Oleksandr Chepelyuk	25	0	14+10	0	0+1	0
50	MF	(Ukraine) UKR	Roman Shandruk	2	0	1+1	0	0	0
54	MF	(Ukraine) UKR	Serhiy Trykosh	2	0	1+1	0	0	0
60	MF	(Ukraine) UKR	Roman Ilnytskyi	4	0	1+3	0	0	0
65	MF	(Ukraine) UKR	Yuriy Teterenko	20	0	14+6	0	0	0
76	MF	(Ukraine) UKR	Andriy Lyashenko	16	0	5+11	0	0	0
86	MF	(Ukraine) UKR	Yevhen Kotyun	2	0	2	0	0	0
Forwards
9	FW	(Ukraine) UKR	Redvan Memeshev	28	2	26	1	2	1
38	FW	(Ukraine) UKR	Serhiy Petrov	31	4	26+3	4	2	0
59	FW	(Ukraine) UKR	Yaroslav Deda	12	1	7+3	0	0+2	1
78	FW	(Ukraine) UKR	Vladyslav Dmytrenko	5	0	2+3	0	0	0
79	FW	(Ukraine) UKR	Bohdan Hladun	1	0	0+1	0	0	0
97	FW	(Ukraine) UKR	Artem Dudik	26	3	16+8	3	2	0
99	FW	(Ukraine) UKR	Anatoliy Didenko	17	2	16+1	2	0	0
Players transferred out during the season
13	DF	(Ukraine) UKR	Artem Shabanov	16	0	14	0	2	0
17	MF	(Ukraine) UKR	Andriy Bohdanov	1	0	1	0	0	0
30	MF	(Ukraine) UKR	Oleh Humenyuk	1	0	1	0	0	0
89	FW	(Ukraine) UKR	Dmytro Kozban	2	0	2	0	0	0
94	FW	(Ukraine) UKR	Viktor Khomchenko	11	1	9	1	2	0

Source: Competitions

Last updated: 31 May 2017

=== Goalscorers ===
Rank	No.	Pos	Nat	Name	Premier League	Cup	Total
1	38	MF	(Ukraine)	Serhiy Petrov	4	0	4
2	97	FW	(Ukraine)	Artem Dudik	3	0	3
3	9	FW	(Ukraine)	Redvan Memeshev	1	1	2
3	99	FW	(Ukraine)	Anatoliy Didenko	2	0	2
5	18	DF	(Ukraine)	Serhiy Lohinov	0	1	1
5	20	MF	(Ukraine)	Dmytro Zaderetskyi	1	0	1
5	22	DF	(Ukraine)	Vladyslav Shapoval	1	0	1
5	59	FW	(Ukraine)	Yaroslav Deda	0	1	1
				Own goal	1	0	1

Last updated: 16 April 2017

=== Clean sheets ===
Rank	No.	Pos	Nat	Name	Premier League	Cup	Total
1	1	GK	(Ukraine)	Artem Kychak	3	0	3
2	73	GK	(Ukraine)	Andriy Marchuk	1	0	1

Last updated: 3 December 2016

=== Disciplinary record ===
No.	Pos	Nat	Player	Premier League			Cup			Total		
No.	Pos	Nat	Player	Booked	(yellow card) (yellow-red card)	Sent off (straight red)	Booked	(yellow card) (yellow-red card)	Sent off (straight red)	Booked	(yellow card) (yellow-red card)	Sent off (straight red)
1	GK	(Ukraine)	Artem Kychak	2	0	0	1	0	0	3	0	0
7	MF	(Ukraine)	Oleh Herasymyuk	6	0	0	1	0	0	7	0	0
9	FW	(Ukraine)	Redvan Memeshev	5	0	0	0	0	0	5	0	0
13	DF	(Ukraine)	Artem Shabanov	2	1	0	1	0	0	3	1	0
17	MF	(Ukraine)	Andriy Bohdanov	1	0	0	0	0	0	1	0	0
18	DF	(Ukraine)	Serhiy Lohinov	2	1	0	1	0	0	3	1	0
20	MF	(Ukraine)	Dmytro Zaderetskyi	5	0	0	1	0	0	6	0	0
22	DF	(Ukraine)	Vladyslav Shapoval	9	0	0	0	0	0	9	0	0
24	DF	(Slovenia)	Miha Goropevšek	10	0	0	0	0	0	10	0	0
25	MF	(Ukraine)	Andriy Nykytyuk	2	0	0	0	0	0	2	0	0
26	DF	(Ukraine)	Roman Nykytyuk	7	0	0	0	0	0	7	0	0
38	FW	(Ukraine)	Serhiy Petrov	3	0	0	0	0	0	3	0	0
47	MF	(Ukraine)	Yuriy Romanyuk	6	1	1	2	0	0	8	1	1
48	MF	(Ukraine)	Oleksandr Chepelyuk	8	0	0	0	0	0	8	0	0
50	MF	(Ukraine)	Roman Shandruk	1	0	0	0	0	0	1	0	0
60	MF	(Ukraine)	Roman Ilnytskyi	1	0	0	0	0	0	1	0	0
65	MF	(Ukraine)	Yuriy Teterenko	3	0	0	0	0	0	3	0	0
67	DF	(Ukraine)	Serhiy Melinyshyn	4	0	0	0	0	0	4	0	0
73	GK	(Ukraine)	Andriy Marchuk	1	0	0	0	0	0	1	0	0
76	MF	(Ukraine)	Andriy Lyashenko	3	0	0	0	0	0	3	0	0
80	DF	(Ukraine)	Ruslan Marushka	2	0	0	0	0	0	2	0	0
86	MF	(Ukraine)	Yevhen Kotyun	1	0	0	0	0	0	1	0	0
94	FW	(Ukraine)	Viktor Khomchenko	4	0	0	0	0	0	4	0	0
97	FW	(Ukraine)	Artem Dudik	0	0	0	1	0	0	1	0	0
99	FW	(Ukraine)	Anatoliy Didenko	4	1	0	0	0	0	4	1	0

Last updated: 27 May 2017
