= 2016–17 FC Dynamo Kyiv season =

Dynamo Kyiv
2016–17 season
- President: Ihor Surkis
- Manager: Serhii Rebrov
- Stadium: NSC Olimpiyskiy
- Ukrainian Premier League: 2nd
- Ukrainian Cup: Runners-up
- Ukrainian Super Cup: Winners
- UEFA Champions League: Group stage
- Top goalscorer: League: Andriy Yarmolenko (15); All: Andriy Yarmolenko (19)
Home colours	Away colours	Third colours

The 2016–17 season was the 26th consecutive season in the top Ukrainian football league for Dynamo Kyiv. Dynamo won the 2016 Ukrainian Super Cup and competed in the Premier League, Ukrainian Cup and UEFA Champions League. Dynamo reached the final of the Ukrainian Cup, finished in second place in the Premier League, and qualified to the Champions League third qualifying round for next season.

== Players ==
=== Squad information ===
Squad no.	Name	Nationality	Position	Date of birth (age)
Goalkeepers
1	Heorhiy Bushchan	(Ukraine)	GK	31 May 1994 (aged 23)
33	Volodymyr Makhankov ^{List B}	(Ukraine)	GK	29 October 1997 (aged 19)
35	Maksym Koval	(Ukraine)	GK	9 December 1992 (aged 24)
72	Artur Rudko	(Ukraine)	GK	7 May 1992 (aged 25)
Defenders
4	Aleksandar Pantić	(Serbia)	DF	11 April 1992 (aged 25)
5	Vitorino Antunes	(Portugal)	DF	1 April 1987 (aged 30)
14	Zurab Ochigava ^{List B}	(Ukraine)	DF	18 May 1995 (aged 22)
24	Domagoj Vida	(Croatia)	DF	29 April 1989 (aged 28)
26	Mykyta Burda ^{List B}	(Ukraine)	DF	24 March 1995 (aged 22)
34	Yevhen Khacheridi	(Ukraine)	DF	28 July 1987 (aged 29)
40	Oleksandr Tymchyk ^{List B}	(Ukraine)	DF	20 January 1997 (aged 20)
42	Pavlo Lukyanchuk ^{List B}	(Ukraine)	DF	19 May 1996 (aged 21)
44	Tamás Kádár	(Hungary)	DF	14 March 1990 (aged 27)
Midfielders
8	Volodymyr Shepelyev ^{List B}	(Ukraine)	MF	1 June 1997 (aged 20)
9	Mykola Morozyuk	(Ukraine)	MF	17 January 1988 (aged 29)
15	Viktor Tsyhankov ^{List B}	(Ukraine)	MF	15 November 1997 (aged 19)
16	Serhiy Sydorchuk	(Ukraine)	MF	2 May 1991 (aged 26)
17	Serhiy Rybalka	(Ukraine)	MF	1 April 1990 (aged 27)
18	Nikita Korzun ^{List B}	(Belarus)	MF	6 March 1995 (aged 22)
19	Denys Harmash	(Ukraine)	MF	19 April 1990 (aged 27)
21	Mykyta Kravchenko ^{List B}	(Ukraine)	MF	14 June 1997 (aged 20)
25	Derlis González	(Paraguay)	MF	20 March 1994 (aged 23)
29	Vitaliy Buyalskyi	(Ukraine)	MF	6 January 1993 (aged 24)
32	Valeriy Fedorchuk	(Ukraine)	MF	5 October 1988 (aged 28)
44	Bohdan Mykhaylychenko ^{List B}	(Ukraine)	MF	21 March 1997 (aged 20)
48	Pavlo Orikhovskyi ^{List B}	(Ukraine)	MF	13 May 1996 (aged 21)
Forwards
10	Andriy Yarmolenko	(Ukraine)	FW	23 October 1989 (aged 27)
20	Roman Yaremchuk	(Ukraine)	FW	27 November 1995 (aged 21)
41	Artem Besyedin ^{List B}	(Ukraine)	FW	31 March 1996 (aged 21)

== Transfers ==
=== In ===
Date	Pos.	Player	Age	Moving from	Type	Fee	Source
Summer
23 May 2016	MF	(Ukraine) Oleksandr Hladkyy	28	(Ukraine) Shakhtar Donetsk	Transfer	Undisclosed	
31 May 2016	MF	(Ukraine) Artem Hromov	26	(Ukraine) Vorskla Poltava	Transfer	Undisclosed	
29 July 2016	MF	(Ivory Coast) Junior Ahissan	19	(Russia) Krylia Sovetov	Transfer	Undisclosed	
30 June 2016	GK	(Ukraine) Maksym Koval	23	(Denmark) Odense Boldklub	Loan return		
30 June 2016	DF	(Ukraine) Andriy Tsurikov	24	(Greece) Levadiakos	Loan return		
30 June 2016	DF	(Ukraine) Yevhen Selin	28	(Greece) Platanias	Loan return		
30 June 2016	DF	(Latvia) Vitālijs Jagodinskis	24	(Ukraine) Hoverla Uzhhorod	Loan return		
30 June 2016	DF	(Ukraine) Dmytro Ryzhuk	24	(Ukraine) Metalist Kharkiv	Loan return		
30 June 2016	MF	(Morocco) Younès Belhanda	26	(Germany) Schalke	Loan return		
30 June 2016	MF	(Ukraine) Vitaliy Hemeha	22	(Ukraine) Hoverla Uzhhorod	Loan return		
30 June 2016	MF	(Ukraine) Yevhen Chumak	21	(Belarus) Torpedo-BelAZ	Loan return		
30 June 2016	MF	(Argentina) Facundo Bertoglio	26	(Greece) Asteras Tripolis	Loan return		
30 June 2016	MF	(Ukraine) Vitaliy Kaverin	26	(Ukraine) Hoverla Uzhhorod	Loan return		
30 June 2016	MF	(Ukraine) Ihor Kharatin	21	(Ukraine) Metalist Kharkiv	Loan return		
30 June 2016	MF	(Ukraine) Orest Kuzyk	21	(Ukraine) Hoverla Uzhhorod	Loan return		
30 June 2016	MF	(Ukraine) Oleksiy Savchenko	23	(Ukraine) Hoverla Uzhhorod	Loan return		
30 June 2016	FW	(Nigeria) Lukman Haruna	25	(Kazakhstan) FC Astana	Loan return		
30 June 2016	FW	(Democratic Republic of the Congo) Dieumerci Mbokani	30	(England) Norwich	Loan return		
30 June 2016	FW	(Ukraine) Artem Kravets	27	(Germany) VfB Stuttgart	Loan return		
30 June 2016	FW	(Ukraine) Oleksiy Khoblenko	22	(Ukraine) Chornomorets	Loan return		
30 June 2016	FW	(Ukraine) Artem Besyedin	20	(Ukraine) Metalist Kharkiv	Loan return		
31 August 2016	MF	(Ukraine) Yevhen Chumak	21	(Ukraine) Zirka Kropyvnytskyi	Loan return		
Winter
1 February 2017	DF	(Serbia) Aleksandar Pantić	24	(Spain) Villarreal	Transfer	Free	
10 February 2017	DF	(Hungary) Tamás Kádár	26	(Poland) Lech Poznań	Transfer	Undisclosed	
28 December 2016	MF	(Ukraine) Vitaliy Hemeha	22	(Poland) Wisła Płock	Loan return		
1 January 2017	FW	(Ukraine) Roman Yaremchuk	20	(Ukraine) FC Oleksandriya	Loan return		
1 January 2017	MF	(Ukraine) Vladyslav Kalitvintsev	23	(Ukraine) Chornomorets	Loan return		
1 January 2017	FW	(Colombia) Andrés Ramiro Escobar	25	(Colombia) Millonarios F.C.	Loan return		
30 March 2017	FW	(Poland) Łukasz Teodorczyk	25	(Belgium) R.S.C. Anderlecht	Loan return		

=== Out ===
Date	Pos.	Player	Age	Moving to	Type	Fee	Source
Summer
30 May 2016	FW	(Ukraine) Oleksandr Yakovenko	29	Unattached	Transfer	Free	
14 June 2016	MF	(Serbia) Radosav Petrović	27	(Portugal) Sporting CP	Transfer	£1.7 million	
1 July 2016	FW	(Ukraine) Oleksiy Khoblenko	22	(Ukraine) Chornomorets	Transfer	Undisclosed	
20 July 2016	MF	(Ukraine) Oleksiy Savchenko	23	(Ukraine) Cherkaskyi Dnipro	Transfer	Undisclosed	
31 July 2016	MF	(Portugal) Miguel Veloso	30	(Italy) Genoa	Transfer	Undisclosed	
16 August 2016	DF	(Ukraine) Dmytro Ryzhuk	24	(Israel) Hapoel Acre	Transfer	Undisclosed	
23 August 2016	DF	(Austria) Aleksandar Dragović	25	(Germany) Bayer Leverkusen	Transfer	£15.5 million	
23 August 2016	MF	(Argentina) Facundo Bertoglio	26	(Cyprus) APOEL	Transfer	Undisclosed	
25 August 2016	MF	(Ukraine) Ihor Kharatin	21	(Ukraine) Zorya Luhansk	Transfer	Undisclosed	
4 September 2016	MF	(Ukraine) Artem Kozak	18	(Greece) PAOK	Transfer	Free	
15 September 2016	MF	(Ukraine) Yevhen Chumak	21	(Ukraine) Karpaty Lviv	Transfer	Free	
16 September 2016	DF	(Ukraine) Pavlo Polehenko	21	(Ukraine) Zirka Kropyvnytskyi	Transfer	Free	
21 September 2016	MF	(Ukraine) Yevhen Troyanovskyi	21	(Ukraine) FC Poltava	Transfer	Free	
21 October 2016	DF	(Latvia) Vitālijs Jagodinskis	24	(Hungary) Diósgyőri VTK	Transfer	Free	
22 October 2016	MF	(Ukraine) Orest Kuzyk	21	(Ukraine) Stal Kamianske	Transfer	Free	
12 July 2016	MF	(Ukraine) Vitaliy Hemeha	22	(Poland) Wisła Płock	Loan		
15 July 2016	MF	(Ukraine) Oleksandr Andriyevskyi	22	(Ukraine) Chornomorets	Loan		
20 July 2016	MF	(Ukraine) Yevhen Chumak	21	(Ukraine) Zirka Kropyvnytskyi	Loan		
22 July 2016	DF	(Ukraine) Andriy Tsurikov	24	(Ukraine) FC Oleksandriya	Loan		
22 July 2016	FW	(Ukraine) Roman Yaremchuk	20	(Ukraine) FC Oleksandriya	Loan		
4 August 2016	WF	(Poland) Łukasz Teodorczyk	25	(Belgium) Anderlecht	Loan		
30 August 2016	FW	(Ukraine) Artem Kravets	27	(Spain) Granada	Loan		
31 August 2016	MF	(Morocco) Younès Belhanda	26	(France) Nice	Loan		
31 August 2016	FW	(Democratic Republic of the Congo) Dieumerci Mbokani	30	(England) Hull City	Loan		
Winter
12 December 2016	GK	(Ukraine) Oleksandr Shovkovskyi	41	Retired	Transfer	Free	
17 December 2016	MF	(Ukraine) Oleh Husyev	33	Unattached	Transfer	Free	
20 December 2016	DF	(Ukraine) Yevhen Selin	28	(Greece) Asteras Tripolis	Transfer	Free	
1 January 2017	GK	(Ukraine) Oleksandr Rybka	29	(Turkey) Karabükspor	Transfer	Free	
1 January 2017	FW	(Nigeria) Lukman Haruna	26	Unattached	Transfer	Free	
1 January 2017	MF	(Ukraine) Renat Mochulyak	18	(Greece) Platanias	Transfer	Undisclosed	
1 January 2017	DF	(Ukraine) Yevhen Makarenko	25	Unattached	Transfer	Free	
8 February 2017	MF	(Ukraine) Oleksiy Khakhliov	18	(Spain) Deportivo Alavés	Transfer	Free	
8 February 2017	FW	(Ukraine) Mykhaylo Udod	19	(Ukraine) Vorskla Poltava	Transfer	Free	
3 March 2017	MF	(Ukraine) Vitaliy Hemeha	23	(Ukraine) Olimpik Donetsk	Transfer	Free	
16 March 2017	MF	(Ukraine) Artem Hromov	27	(Russia) Krylia Sovetov	Transfer	Free	
30 March 2017	FW	(Poland) Łukasz Teodorczyk	25	(Belgium) R.S.C. Anderlecht	Transfer	Undisclosed	
5 April 2017	DF	(Brazil) Danilo Silva	30	(Brazil) Internacional	Transfer	Free	
25 January 2017	MF	(Ukraine) Serhiy Myakushko	23	(Ukraine) Vorskla Poltava	Loan		
31 January 2017	MF	(Ukraine) Vladyslav Kalitvintsev	24	(Ukraine) Zorya Luhansk	Loan		
9 February 2017	FW	(Colombia) Andrés Ramiro Escobar	25	(Brazil) Vasco da Gama	Loan		
28 February 2017	FW	(Brazil) Júnior Moraes	29	(China) Tianjin Quanjian	Loan		
1 March 2017	FW	(Ukraine) Oleksandr Hladkyy	29	(Ukraine) Karpaty Lviv	Loan		

== Pre-season and friendlies ==
20 June 2016 Friendly	Dynamo Kyiv (Ukraine)	3–0	(Ukraine) Kolos Kovalivka	Kyiv
17:00 EEST (UTC+03:00)	Hladkyy 6'; Morozyuk 15'; Besyedin 62'	Report		Stadium: Dynamo Training Center

25 June 2016 Friendly	Dynamo Kyiv (Ukraine)	1–0	(Ukraine) Olimpik Donetsk	Kyiv
18:00 EEST (UTC+03:00)	Teodorczyk 90'	Report		Stadium: Dynamo Training Center; Attendance: 100; Referee: Ivan Bondar

30 June 2016 Friendly	Dynamo Kyiv (Ukraine)	1–0	(Germany) Würzburger Kickers	Schwaz, Austria
17:30 EEST (UTC+03:00)	Hladkyy 59'	Report		Stadium: Silberstadt Arena; Attendance: 50

3 July 2016 Friendly	Dynamo Kyiv (Ukraine)	2–1	(Bulgaria) Ludogorets	Schwaz, Austria
19:00 EEST (UTC+03:00)	Buyalskyi 2'; Besyedin 72'	Report	Cafu 3'	Stadium: Silberstadt Arena; Attendance: 50

4 July 2016 Friendly	Dynamo Kyiv (Ukraine)	2–0	(Georgia (country)) Dinamo Tbilisi	Jenbach, Austria
19:00 EEST (UTC+03:00)	Yarmolenko 21'; Moraes 76'	Report		Stadium: Jenbach stadion Attendance: 100

7 July 2016 Friendly	Dynamo Kyiv (Ukraine)	1–1	(Romania) FC Botoșani	Schwaz, Austria
19:00 EEST (UTC+03:00)	Rybalka 71'	Report	Vașvari 6' (pen.)	Stadium: Silberstadt Arena; Attendance: 50

8 July 2016 Friendly	Dynamo Kyiv (Ukraine)	8–2	(Croatia) RNK Split	Jenbach, Austria
19:00 EEST (UTC+03:00)	Harmash 2', 16', 34', 63'; Yarmolenko 4', 55'; González 39'; Morozyuk 15' (pen.)	Report	Samac 60'; Vojnović 76'	Stadium: Jenbach stadion Attendance: 100

10 June 2016 Friendly	Dynamo Kyiv (Ukraine)	3–0	(Bulgaria) CSKA Sofia	Schwaz, Austria
18:00 EEST (UTC+03:00)	González 47'; Sydorchuk 58'; Yarmolenko 76'	Report		Stadium: Silberstadt Arena; Attendance: 50

8 October 2016 Friendly	Dynamo Kyiv (Ukraine)	3–3	(Ukraine) Olimpik Donetsk	Kyiv
13:00 EEST (UTC+03:00)	Ochigava 45'; Harmash 67'; Danilo Silva 83'	Report	Lysenko 2' (pen.), 29', 35'	Stadium: Lobanovskyi Dynamo Stadium; Attendance: 500; Referee: Yevhen Aranovsky

12 November 2016 Friendly	Dynamo Kyiv (Ukraine)	6–0	(Moldova) Milsami Orhei	Kyiv
13:00 EET (UTC+03:00)	Harmash 20'; Husyev 28'; Buyalskyi 36', 71'; Hladkyy 72'; Myakushko 90+3'	Report		Stadium: Lobanovskyi Dynamo Stadium; Referee: Yevhen Aranovsky

21 January 2017 Friendly	Dynamo Kyiv (Ukraine)	3–1	(Germany) FC St. Pauli	Marbella, Spain
19:00 EET (UTC+02:00)	Besyedin 56'; Harmash 58'; Morozyuk 72'	Report	Dudziak 87'	Stadium: Estadio Municipal de Marbella

22 January 2017 Friendly	Dynamo Kyiv (Ukraine)	3–0	(China) Tianjin TEDA	Marbella, Spain
17:00 EET (UTC+02:00)	Harmash 27'; Yarmolenko 54'; Hromov 87'	Report		Stadium: Football Center

25 January 2017 Friendly	Dynamo Kyiv (Ukraine)	1–3	(Austria) FC Liefering	Marbella, Spain
17:00 EET (UTC+02:00)	Yarmolenko 27' (pen.)	Report	Haidara 47'; Sturm 78'; Grabovac 90'	Stadium: Estadio Municipal de Marbella

29 January 2017 Friendly	Dynamo Kyiv (Ukraine)	1–1	(South Korea) Suwon Bluewings	Marbella, Spain
17:00 EET (UTC+02:00)	Yaremchuk 67'	Report	Lee Jong-sung 51'	Stadium: Football Center

30 January 2017 Friendly	Dynamo Kyiv (Ukraine)	2–2	(Bulgaria) CSKA Sofia	Marbella, Spain
13:00 EET (UTC+02:00)	Buyalskyi 36'; González 38'	Report	Rui Pedro 4'; Despodov 90' (pen.)	Stadium: Football Center

7 February 2017 Friendly	Dynamo Kyiv (Ukraine)	2–1	(Croatia) NK Osijek	Marbella, Spain
17:30 EET (UTC+02:00)	Tsyhankov 19'; Orikhovskyi 89'	Report	Knežević 77'	Stadium: Football Center

10 February 2017 Friendly	Dynamo Kyiv (Ukraine)	1–1	(China) Shandong Luneng	Algeciras, Spain
18:00 EET (UTC+02:00)	Yaremchuk 55'	Report	Pellè 30'	Stadium: Estadio Nuevo Mirador

11 February 2017 Friendly	Dynamo Kyiv (Ukraine)	5–0	Hebei China Fortune	Málaga, Spain
17:00 EET (UTC+02:00)	Yaremchuk 1', 53'; Buyalskyi 41'; Lu Yang 57' (o.g.); Moraes 62'	Report		Stadium: Football Center

13 February 2017 Friendly	Dynamo Kyiv (Ukraine)	Cancelled	(Spain) Marbella FC	Marbella, Spain
17:00 EET (UTC+02:00)		[ Report]		Stadium: Football Center

13 February 2017 Friendly	Dynamo Kyiv (Ukraine)	0–0	(Switzerland) FC Köniz	Marbella, Spain
17:00 EET (UTC+02:00)		Report		Stadium: Football Center

14 February 2017 Friendly	Dynamo Kyiv (Ukraine)	1–0	(China) Beijing Sinobo Guoan	Marbella, Spain
17:00 EET (UTC+02:00)	Yarmolenko 23'	Report		Stadium: Football Center

16 February 2017 Friendly	Dynamo Kyiv (Ukraine)	2–1	(Denmark) Hobro IK	Marbella, Spain
17:00 EET (UTC+02:00)	Fedorchuk 82'; Besyedin 88'	Report	Jessen 90+1'	Stadium: Football Center

17 February 2017 Friendly	Dynamo Kyiv (Ukraine)	2–0	(Norway) Strømsgodset	Marbella, Spain
17:00 EET (UTC+02:00)	Besyedin 75'; Yarmolenko 90+2'	Report		Stadium: Football Center

25 March 2017 Friendly	Dynamo Kyiv (Ukraine)	4–0	(Ukraine) Vorskla Poltava	Kyiv
14:00 EET (UTC+02:00)	Harmash 4', 27', 40'; Yaremchuk 63'	Report		Stadium: Lobanovskyi Dynamo Stadium; Referee: Yevhen Aranovsky

== Competitions ==
=== Overall ===
Competition	Started round	Final position	First match	Last match
Premier League	Matchday 1	2nd	23 July 2016	31 May 2017
Cup	Round of 16	Final	26 October 2016	17 May 2017
Super Cup	Final	Winner	16 July 2016	16 July 2016
Champions League	Group stage	Group stage	13 September 2016	6 December 2016

Last updated:

=== Premier League ===
==== League table ====
Pos	Team	Pld	W	D	L	GF	GA	GD	Pts	Qualification or relegation
1	Shakhtar Donetsk (C)	32	25	5	2	66	24	+42	80	Qualification for the Champions League group stage
2	Dynamo Kyiv	32	21	4	7	69	33	+36	67	Qualification for the Champions League third qualifying round
3	Zorya Luhansk	32	16	6	10	45	31	+14	54	Qualification for the Europa League group stage (Note: Since winners of 2016–17 Ukrainian Cup, Shakhtar Donetsk, qualified for European competition based on their league position, the spot awarded to the cup winner (Europa League group stage) was passed to the third-placed team and the spot for the third-placed team (Europa League third qualifying round) was passed to the fifth-placed team.)
4	Olimpik Donetsk	32	11	11	10	33	44	−11	44	Qualification for the Europa League third qualifying round
5	FC Oleksandriya	32	10	10	12	41	43	−2	40	Qualification for the Europa League third qualifying round
6	Chornomorets Odesa	32	10	8	14	25	37	−12	38	

Source: UEFA, Ukrainian Premier League, Soccerway
Rules for classification: 1) Points; 2) Goal difference; 3) Goals scored; 4) Head-to-head points; 5) Head-to-head goal difference; 6) Head-to-head goals scored; 7) Draw.
(C) Champions

==== Results summary ====
Overall								Home						Away					
Pld	W	D	L	GF	GA	GD	Pts	W	D	L	GF	GA	GD	W	D	L	GF	GA	GD
32	21	4	7	69	33	+36	67	11	0	5	35	16	+19	10	4	2	34	17	+17

Last updated: 31 May 2017.
Source: Competitive matches

==== Results by round ====
Round	1	2	3	4	5	6	7	8	9	10	11	12	13	14	15	16	17	18	19	20	21	22	23	24	25	26	27	28	29	30	31	32
Ground	H	A	H	A	H	H	A	H	A	H	A	A	H	A	H	A	A	H	A	H	A	H	A	H	A	H	A	H	A	H	A	H
Result	W	W	W	W	W	L	D	L	W	W	D	D	W	W	W	W	D	L	W	W	L	W	W	W	W	L	W	W	L	L	W	W
Position	2	2	2	2	2	2	2	3	3	2	2	3	3	2	2	2	2	2	2	2	2	2	2	2	2	2	2	2	2	2	2	2

Updated to match(es) played on 31 May 2017. Source: Competitive matches
A = Away; H = Home; W = Win; D = Draw; L = Loss

==== Matches ====
23 July 2016 1	Dynamo Kyiv	5–1	FC Oleksandriya	Kyiv
19:30 EEST (UTC+03:00)	Sydorchuk (yellow card) 11'; Moraes 26', 56', 62'; Khacheridi (yellow card) 44'; Buyalskyi 70'; Vida 79'	Report	Leonov (yellow card) 19'; Starenkyi (yellow card) 51'; Mykytsey (yellow card) 51'; Myahkov (yellow card) 66'; Banada 86'	Stadium: NSC Olimpiyskiy; Attendance: 10,139; Referee: Kostyantyn Truhanov

31 July 2016 2	Karpaty Lviv	0–2	Dynamo Kyiv	Lviv
19:30 EEST (UTC+03:00)	Kostevych (yellow card) 66'; Ksyonz (yellow card) 70'; Novotryasov (yellow card) 77'; Lobay (yellow card) 78'	Report	Yarmolenko 31', 84', (yellow card) 75'	Stadium: Arena Lviv; Attendance: 10,044; Referee: Anatoliy Zhabchenko

6 August 2016 3	Dynamo Kyiv	1–0	Dnipro	Kyiv
19:30 EEST (UTC+03:00)	Moraes 62'; Buyalskyi (yellow card) 65'	Report	Cheberyachko (yellow card) 36'; Luchkevych (yellow card) 54'; Politylo (yellow card) 67'	Stadium: NSC Olimpiyskiy; Attendance: 17,286; Referee: Yuriy Vaks

14 August 2016 4	Stal Kamianske	1–2	Dynamo Kyiv	Dnipro
19:30 EEST (UTC+03:00)	Stamenković (yellow card) 19'; Ischenko 26'; Edgar Malakyan (yellow card) 54' (yellow-red card) 72'; Vasin (yellow card) 56'; Dovhyi (yellow card) 90+2'	Report	Harmash 79', (yellow card) 82'; Antunes 88'; Moraes (yellow card) 89'	Stadium: Meteor Stadium; Attendance: 1,350; Referee: Olexandr Derdo

20 August 2016 5	Dynamo Kyiv	2–1	Volyn Lutsk	Kyiv
19:30 EEST (UTC+03:00)	Sydorchuk (yellow card) 6'; Antunes (yellow card) 39'; Morozyuk 53'; Harmash 61', (yellow card) 64'	Report	Goropevšek (yellow card) 15'; Herasymyuk (yellow card) 39'; Petrov 38'; Zaderetskyi (yellow card) 41'; Chepelyuk (yellow card) 69'	Stadium: NSC Olimpiyskiy; Attendance: 8,246; Referee: Ihor Paskhal

27 August 2016 6	Dynamo Kyiv	0–2	Vorskla Poltava	Kyiv
19:30 EEST (UTC+03:00)	Moraes (yellow card) 29'; Yarmolenko (yellow card) 64'	Report	Kolomoyets 15'; Kravchenko (yellow card) 36'; Chesnakov (yellow card) 63'	Stadium: NSC Olimpiyskiy; Attendance: 8,837; Referee: Kostyantyn Truhanov

9 September 2016 7	Shakhtar Donetsk	1–1	Dynamo Kyiv	Kharkiv
21:00 EEST (UTC+03:00)	Stepanenko (yellow card) 43'; Fred (yellow card) 60'; Rakitskiy (yellow card) 63'; Dentinho 75'; Ferreyra (yellow card) 90+7'	Report	Sydorchuk (yellow card) 21'; Husyev 24' (pen.); Yarmolenko (yellow card) 72'; Harmash (yellow card) 73'; Fedorchuk (yellow card) 88'; Morozyuk (yellow card) 89'; Moraes (yellow card) 90+5'; Khacheridi (yellow card) 90+7'	Stadium: OSC Metalist; Attendance: 39,677; Referee: Anatoliy Abdula

18 September 2016 8	Dynamo Kyiv	0–1	Zorya Luhansk	Kyiv
19:30 EEST (UTC+03:00)		Report	Sobol (yellow card) 88'; Kulach (yellow card) 90+2'; Opanasenko 90+3'	Stadium: NSC Olimpiyskiy; Attendance: 11,024; Referee: Yuriy Vaks

24 September 2016 9	Olimpik Donetsk	0–4	Dynamo Kyiv	Sumy
14:00 EEST (UTC+03:00)		Report	Tsyhankov 9'; Moraes 26'; Fedorchuk (yellow card) 46', (goal) 78'; Morozyuk (yellow card) 58'; González 59'	Stadium: Yuvileiny Stadium; Attendance: 13,850; Referee: Anatoliy Zhabchenko

2 October 2016 10	Dynamo Kyiv	2–0	Zirka Kropyvnytskyi	Kyiv
19:30 EEST (UTC+03:00)	Sydorchuk 20'; Tsyhankov 57'	Report	Pereyra (yellow card) 20'; Moya (yellow card) 25'; Kochura (yellow card) 54'; Bayenko (yellow card) 55'; Borja Ekiza (yellow card) 56'; Favorov (yellow card) 71'	Stadium: NSC Olimpiyskiy; Attendance: 7,025; Referee: Olexandr Ivanov

15 October 2016 11	Chornomorets Odesa	1–1	Dynamo Kyiv	Odesa
19:30 EEST (UTC+03:00)	Lyulka (yellow card) 22'; Korkishko (yellow card) 38'; Martynenko (yellow card) 53'; Filimonov (yellow card) 78'; Khacheridi 90+4' (o.g.)	Report	Khacheridi (yellow card) 30'; Moraes 30'; Sydorchuk (yellow card) 80'	Stadium: Chornomorets Stadium; Attendance: 9,102; Referee: Ihor Paskhal

23 October 2016 12	FC Oleksandriya	1–1	Dynamo Kyiv	Oleksandriya
14:00 EEST (UTC+03:00)	Mykytsey (yellow card) 59'; Ponomar 79', (yellow card) 80'; Shendrik (yellow card) 90+1'; Leonov (yellow card) 90+3'	Report	González 52'; Hladkyy (yellow card) 71'; Yarmolenko (yellow card) 75'; Vida (yellow card) 90+3'	Stadium: CSC Nika Stadium; Attendance: 3,692; Referee: Yuriy Hryso

29 October 2016 13	Dynamo Kyiv	4–1	Karpaty Lviv	Kyiv
19:30 EEST (UTC+03:00)	Besyedin 16'; Vida 28'; Husyev (yellow card) 53'; Morozyuk 81'; Orikhovskyi 84'	Report	Kravets (yellow card) 34'; Mysak (yellow card) 41'; Zaviyskyi 86'	Stadium: NSC Olimpiyskiy; Attendance: 5,118; Referee: Yuriy Vaks

6 November 2016 14	Dnipro	1–2	Dynamo Kyiv	Dnipro
19:30 EEST (UTC+03:00)	Rotan 25' (pen.), (yellow card) 63'; Lunin (yellow card) 72'; Bliznichenko (yellow card) 84'	Report	Besyedin 21'; Sydorchuk 69'	Stadium: Dnipro-Arena; Referee: Kateryna Monzul

19 November 2016 15	Dynamo Kyiv	2–1	Stal Kamianske	Kyiv
17:00 EEST (UTC+03:00)	Khacheridi 18'; Vida (yellow card) 33'; Makarenko 50'; Rybalka (yellow card) 55'; Harmash (yellow card) 68'	Report	Comvalius 56'; Mysyk (yellow card) 60'	Stadium: NSC Olimpiyskiy; Attendance: 4,186; Referee: Olexandr Holovkov

26 November 2016 16	Volyn Lutsk	1–4	Dynamo Kyiv	Lutsk
19:30 EEST (UTC+03:00)	Didenko 6'; Chepelyuk (yellow card) 12'; Roman Nykytyuk (yellow card) 89'	Report	Moraes 20', 71', 90+3'; Yarmolenko 45'	Stadium: Avanhard Stadium; Attendance: 0 Referee: Yuriy Hryso

3 December 2016 17	Vorskla Poltava	2–2	Dynamo Kyiv	Poltava
14:00 EEST (UTC+03:00)	Dytyatev (yellow card) 10'; Chesnakov (yellow card) 14'; Tursunov 15'; Odaryuk (yellow card) 25'; Rebenok 33'; Bartulović (yellow card) 65'; Siminin (yellow card) 72'	Report	Sydorchuk 4'; Yarmolenko 14' (pen.); Besyedin (yellow card) 70'	Stadium: Vorskla Stadium; Attendance: 1,200; Referee: Yuriy Vaks

12 December 2016 18	Dynamo Kyiv	3–4	Shakhtar Donetsk	Kyiv
19:00 EEST (UTC+03:00)	Moraes 1', (red card) 60'; Rybalka 30', (yellow card) 56' (yellow-red card) 90+5'; Burda (yellow card) 53'; González (yellow card) 64'	Report	Khacheridi 3', 88' (o.g.); Stepanenko (yellow card) 28'; Fred 50', (yellow card) 87'; Ferreyra 58'; Rakitskiy (yellow card) 61'; Srna (yellow card) 65'; Dentinho (yellow card) 90+5'	Stadium: NSC Olimpiyskiy; Attendance: 21,318; Referee: Anatoliy Zhabchenko

25 February 2017 19	Zorya Luhansk	1–2	Dynamo Kyiv	Zaporizhia
14:00 EEST (UTC+03:00)	Bonaventure 4'; Opanasenko (yellow card) 50' (yellow-red card) 87'; Ljubenović (yellow card) 60'	Report	Harmash 14'; Vida (yellow card) 25'; Besyedin 30'	Stadium: Slavutych-Arena; Attendance: 3,800; Referee: Kostyantyn Trukhanov

4 March 2017 20	Dynamo Kyiv	1–0	Olimpik Donetsk	Kyiv
17:00 EEST (UTC+03:00)	Harmash (yellow card) 45'; Yarmolenko (yellow card) 68'; Besyedin 90+2'	Report	Tsymbalyuk (yellow card) 71'; Illoy-Ayyet (yellow card) 78'; Fedoriv (yellow card) 84'	Stadium: NSC Olimpiyskiy; Attendance: 10,130; Referee: Yuriy Hryso

12 March 2017 21	Zirka Kropyvnytskyi	2–0	Dynamo Kyiv	Kropyvnytskyi
14:00 EEST (UTC+03:00)	Eseola (yellow card) 6'; Batsula 33'; Polehenko 71'; Bilonoh (yellow card) 90'	Report	Rybalka (yellow card) 26'; Kádár (yellow card) 33'; Harmash (yellow card) 60'	Stadium: Zirka Stadium; Attendance: 7,933; Referee: Yaroslav Kozyk

18 March 2017 22	Dynamo Kyiv	2–1	Chornomorets Odesa	Kyiv
19:00 EEST (UTC+03:00)	Yarmolenko 7', (yellow card) 90'; Sydorchuk 45'; Fedorchuk (yellow card) 88'	Report	Smirnov (yellow card) 65'; Khocholava 72', (yellow card) 75'; Korkishko (yellow card) 73'	Stadium: NSC Olimpiyskiy; Attendance: 7,046; Referee: Kateryna Monzul

2 April 2017 23	FC Oleksandriya	1–4	Dynamo Kyiv	Oleksandriya
14:00 EEST (UTC+03:00)	Ohirya 7', (yellow card) 90'; Shendrik (yellow card) 26'; Starenkyi (yellow card) 33'; Chanturishvili (yellow card) 60'	Report	Besyedin 60', (yellow card) 71'; Harmash 66'; Yarmolenko 84', 90+3' (pen.)	Stadium: CSC Nika Stadium; Attendance: 5,500; Referee: Yuriy Mozharovsky

9 April 2017 24	Dynamo Kyiv	4–0	Olimpik Donetsk	Kyiv
19:30 EEST (UTC+03:00)	Besyedin 21'; Yarmolenko 26', 65'; Harmash 51'; Morozyuk (yellow card) 58'	Report	Illoy-Ayyet (yellow card) 60'; Hryshko (yellow card) 90'	Stadium: NSC Olimpiyskiy; Attendance: 8,361; Referee: Anatoliy Abdula

14 April 2017 25	Zorya Luhansk	0–1	Dynamo Kyiv	Zaporizhia
19:00 EEST (UTC+03:00)	Rafael Forster (yellow card) 60'	Report	Harmash 39'; Shepelyev (yellow card) 69'; Pantić (yellow card) 70'	Stadium: Slavutych-Arena; Attendance: 7,497; Referee: Anatoliy Zhabchenko

22 April 2017 26	Dynamo Kyiv	0–1	Shakhtar Donetsk	Kyiv
19:30 EEST (UTC+03:00)	Morozyuk (yellow card) 49'; Sydorchuk (yellow card) 54'; Harmash (yellow card) 55'	Report	Ferreyra 12', (yellow card) 90+3'; Marlos (yellow card) 74'	Stadium: NSC Olimpiyskiy; Attendance: 51,730; Referee: Kostyantyn Trukhanov

30 April 2017 27	Chornomorets Odesa	1–4	Dynamo Kyiv	Kyiv
19:30 EEST (UTC+03:00)	Kabayev (yellow card) 51'; Murashov (yellow card) 53'; Tatarkov 84'	Report	Yarmolenko 2', 80' (pen.), (yellow card) 17'; Besyedin (yellow card) 39', (goal) 40'; Vida 45'	Stadium: NSC Olimpiyskiy; Attendance: 5,431; Referee: Yuriy Mozharovsky

7 May 2017 28	Dynamo Kyiv	6–0	FC Oleksandriya	Kyiv
19:30 EEST (UTC+03:00)	Yarmolenko 7' (pen.); Besyedin 12'; Pantić (yellow card) 41'; Harmash 45+2', 57'; Morozyuk 73'; Tsyhankov 80'	Report	Siminin (red card) 5'	Stadium: NSC Olimpiyskiy; Attendance: 7,896; Referee: Oleksandr Derdo

13 May 2017 29	Olimpik Donetsk	2–1	Dynamo Kyiv	Kyiv
17:00 EEST (UTC+03:00)	Serhiychuk 8'; Bohdanov (yellow card) 37'; Postupalenko 63'; Brikner (yellow card) 87'; Tsymbalyuk (yellow card) 90+2'	Report	Kádár (yellow card) 80'; Burda 90+4'	Stadium: Dynamo Stadium; Attendance: 3,531; Referee: Yuriy Mozharovsky

21 May 2017 30	Dynamo Kyiv	1–2	Zorya Luhansk	Kyiv
19:30 EEST (UTC+03:00)	Ochigava (yellow card) 14'; Morozyuk 17'; Koval (yellow card) 58'	Report	Rafael Forster (yellow card) 17'; Checher 36'; Bonaventure 57'; Hrechyshkin (yellow card) 60'; Petryak (yellow card) 69'; Ljubenović (yellow card) 71'; Babenko (yellow card) 86'	Stadium: NSC Olimpiyskiy; Attendance: 8,193; Referee: Kateryna Monzul

26 May 2017 31	Shakhtar Donetsk	2–3	Dynamo Kyiv	Kharkiv
19:30 EEST (UTC+03:00)	Alan Patrick 23'; Dentinho 58'; Tankovskyi (yellow card) 63'; Marlos (yellow card) 90+3'	Report	Harmash 20', (yellow card) 34'; Yarmolenko 52' (pen.), 71'; Antunes (yellow card) 87'	Stadium: Metalist OSC; Attendance: 12,664; Referee: Oleksandr Derdo

31 May 2017 32	Dynamo Kyiv	2–1	Chornomorets Odesa	Odesa
19:00 EEST (UTC+03:00)	González 29'; Shepelyev (yellow card) 32'; Yarmolenko 64'; Burda (yellow card) 66'; Morozyuk (yellow card) 81'	Report	Khocholava (yellow card) 33'; Andriyevskyi 53' (pen.), (yellow card) 55'; Musolitin (yellow card) 84'; Danchenko (yellow card) 90'	Stadium: Chornomorets Stadium; Attendance: 6,123; Referee: Yaroslav Kozyk

=== Ukrainian Cup ===
26 October 2016 Round of 16 (1/8)	Dynamo Kyiv	5–2 (a.e.t.)	Zorya Luhansk	Kyiv
19:00 EEST (UTC+03:00)	González 14', 97'; Khacheridi (yellow card) 59'; Ochigava (yellow card) 64'; Tsyhankov 65'; Antunes (yellow card) 84'; Moraes 100' (pen.), 119'	Report	Lipartia (yellow card) 5'; Rafael Forster 22' (pen.); Sobol (yellow card) 32'; Kharatin (yellow card) 45+2'; Dennis (yellow card) 56'; Sivakov (yellow card) 57', (goal) 89'; Hrechyshkin (yellow card) 85'	Stadium: NSC Olimpiyskiy; Attendance: 5,375; Referee: Anatoliy Zhabchenko

30 November 2016 Quarterfinal	Naftovyk-Ukrnafta Okhtyrka	Postponed^{(1)}	Dynamo Kyiv	Okhtyrka
EEST (UTC+03:00)		[ Report]		Stadium: Naftovyk Stadium

5 April 2017 Quarterfinal	Naftovyk-Ukrnafta Okhtyrka	0–1	Dynamo Kyiv	Okhtyrka
17:00 EEST (UTC+03:00)	Bilyk (yellow card) 84'	Report	Harmash 44'; Sydorchuk (yellow card) 62'; Pantić (yellow card) 66'	Stadium: Naftovyk Stadium; Attendance: 4,930; Referee: Yaroslav Hryso

26 April 2017 Semifinal	MFC Mykolaiv	0–4	Dynamo Kyiv	Mykolaiv
18:00 EEST (UTC+03:00)		Report	Yarmolenko 45', 81' (pen.), 90+1'; Kádár 62'	Stadium: Central City Stadium; Attendance: 14,100; Referee: Kateryna Monzul

17 May 2017 Final	Shakhtar Donetsk	1–0	Dynamo Kyiv	Kharkiv
21:00 EEST (UTC+03:00)	Srna (yellow card) 55'; Ferreyra (yellow card) 76'; Marlos 80'; Pyatov (yellow card) 90+4'	Report	Sydorchuk (yellow card) 54'; Kádár (yellow card) 76'; Harmash (yellow card) 90+2'	Stadium: OSC Metalist; Referee: Kostyantyn Trukhanov

Notes:

- ^(1) Match postponed due to the frozen pitch at Naftovyk Stadium being unplayable.

=== Ukrainian Super Cup ===
16 July 2016 Final	Shakhtar Donetsk	1–1 (3 – 4 p)	Dynamo Kyiv	Odesa
21:00 EEST (UTC+03:00)	Kryvtsov (yellow card) 50'; Srna (yellow card) 54'; Fred 58'; Stepanenko (yellow card) 59'	Report	Sydorchuk (yellow card) 69'; Khacheridi (yellow card) 73'; Vida 80'; Moraes (yellow card) 89'	Stadium: Chornomorets Stadium; Attendance: 26,109; Referee: Anatoliy Abdula
	Penalties
	Srna (penalty scored); Bernard (penalty missed); Ismaily (penalty scored); Fred (penalty scored); Seleznyov (penalty missed)		Antunes (penalty scored); Morozyuk (penalty scored); Harmash (penalty missed); Khacheridi (penalty scored); Moraes (penalty scored)

=== UEFA Champions League ===
==== Group stage ====
Pos	Team	Pld	W	D	L	GF	GA	GD	Pts	Qualification	NAP	BEN	BES	DKV
1	(Italy) Napoli	6	3	2	1	11	8	+3	11	Advance to knockout phase	—	4–2	2–3	0–0
2	(Portugal) Benfica	6	2	2	2	10	10	0	8	Advance to knockout phase	1–2	—	1–1	1–0
3	(Turkey) Beşiktaş	6	1	4	1	9	14	−5	7	Transfer to Europa League	1–1	3–3	—	1–1
4	(Ukraine) Dynamo Kyiv	6	1	2	3	8	6	+2	5		1–2	0–2	6–0	—

Source: UEFA
Rules for classification: Group stage tiebreakers

Win Draw Loss Fixtures

13 September 2016 1	Dynamo Kyiv (Ukraine)	1–2	(Italy) Napoli	Kyiv
20:45 CEST (UTC+02:00)	Sydorchuk (yellow card) 9' (yellow-red card) 68'; Harmash 26', (yellow card) 56'	Report	Milik 36', 45+2', (yellow card) 65'	Stadium: Olympic Stadium; Attendance: 35,137; Referee: Willie Collum

28 September 2016 2	Beşiktaş (Turkey)	1–1	(Ukraine) Dynamo Kyiv	Istanbul, Turkey
20:45 CEST (UTC+02:00)	Quaresma 29'; Adriano (yellow card) 40'; Arslan (yellow card) 54'	Report	Korzun (yellow card) 27'; Tsyhankov 65'; Harmash (yellow card) 65'; Vida (yellow card) 54'	Stadium: Vodafone Arena; Attendance: 33,938; Referee: Felix Zwayer

19 October 2016 3	Dynamo Kyiv (Ukraine)	0–2	(Portugal) Benfica	Kyiv
20:45 CEST (UTC+02:00)	Korzun (yellow card) 34'	Report	Salvio 9' (pen.); Mitroglou (yellow card) 45'; Cervi 55'	Stadium: Olympic Stadium; Attendance: 25,991; Referee: David Fernández Borbalán

1 November 2016 4	Benfica (Portugal)	1–0	(Ukraine) Dynamo Kyiv	Lisbon, Portugal
20:45 CET (UTC+01:00)	Salvio 45+2' (pen.); Samaris (yellow card) 79'	Report	González (yellow card) 11'; Morozyuk (yellow card) 15'; Makarenko (yellow card) 44'; Vida (yellow card) 45'; Rybalka (yellow card) 56'; Khacheridi (yellow card) 90+4'	Stadium: Estádio da Luz; Attendance: 51,641; Referee: Clément Turpin

23 November 2016 5	Napoli (Italy)	0–0	(Ukraine) Dynamo Kyiv	Naples, Italy
20:45 CET (UTC+01:00)	Koulibaly (yellow card) 75'	Report	Sydorchuk (yellow card) 19'	Stadium: Stadio San Paolo; Attendance: 33,736; Referee: Ovidiu Hațegan

6 December 2016 6	Dynamo Kyiv (Ukraine)	6–0	(Turkey) Beşiktaş	Kyiv
20:45 CET (UTC+01:00)	Besyedin 9'; Yarmolenko 30' (pen.); Buyalskyi 32'; Burda (yellow card) 43'; González 45+3'; Sydorchuk 60'; Moraes 77'	Report	Özyakup (yellow card) 20'; Beck (red card) 29'; Aboubakar (yellow card) 30' (yellow-red card) 56'; Adriano (yellow card) 49'	Stadium: Olympic Stadium; Attendance: 14,036; Referee: Craig Thomson

== Statistics ==
=== Appearances and goals ===
No.	Pos	Nat	Player	Total		Premier League		Cup		Super Cup		CL	
No.	Pos	Nat	Player	Apps	Goals	Apps	Goals	Apps	Goals	Apps	Goals	Apps	Goals
Goalkeepers
35	GK	(Ukraine) UKR	Maksym Koval	9	0	7	0	2	0	0	0	0	0
72	GK	(Ukraine) UKR	Artur Rudko	24	0	17	0	2	0	0	0	5	0
Defenders
4	DF	(Serbia) SRB	Aleksandar Pantić	16	0	14	0	2	0	0	0	0	0
5	DF	(Portugal) POR	Vitorino Antunes	27	1	20	1	2	0	1	0	4	0
14	DF	(Ukraine) UKR	Zurab Ochigava	11	0	4+4	0	2+1	0	0	0	0	0
24	DF	(Croatia) CRO	Domagoj Vida	39	4	28	3	3+1	0	1	1	6	0
26	DF	(Ukraine) UKR	Mykyta Burda	6	1	5	1	0	0	0	0	1	0
34	DF	(Ukraine) UKR	Yevhen Khacheridi	20	1	12	1	1	0	0+1	0	6	0
40	DF	(Ukraine) UKR	Oleksandr Tymchyk	3	0	2	0	1	0	0	0	0	0
44	DF	(Hungary) HUN	Tamás Kádár	13	1	11	0	2	1	0	0	0	0
Midfielders
8	MF	(Ukraine) UKR	Volodymyr Shepelyev	14	0	11+2	0	1	0	0	0	0	0
9	MF	(Ukraine) UKR	Mykola Morozyuk	35	4	26+3	4	2	0	1	0	3	0
15	MF	(Ukraine) UKR	Viktor Tsyhankov	30	5	12+10	3	2	1	0	0	3+3	1
16	MF	(Ukraine) UKR	Serhiy Sydorchuk	37	5	25+3	4	2+1	0	1	0	5	1
17	MF	(Ukraine) UKR	Serhiy Rybalka	34	1	17+10	1	2	0	0	0	5	0
18	MF	(Belarus) BLR	Nikita Korzun	16	0	5+6	0	0	0	1	0	1+3	0
19	MF	(Ukraine) UKR	Denys Harmash	32	11	18+8	9	1+1	1	0+1	0	3	1
21	MF	(Ukraine) UKR	Mykyta Kravchenko	2	0	1	0	0+1	0	0	0	0	0
25	MF	(Paraguay) PAR	Derlis González	26	6	15+3	3	1+1	2	1	0	4+1	1
29	MF	(Ukraine) UKR	Vitaliy Buyalskyi	28	2	17+4	1	1+1	0	1	0	3+1	1
32	MF	(Ukraine) UKR	Valeriy Fedorchuk	11	1	2+6	1	0+1	0	0+1	0	1	0
48	MF	(Ukraine) UKR	Pavlo Orikhovskyi	6	1	2+1	1	1	0	0	0	0+2	0
Forwards
10	FW	(Ukraine) UKR	Andriy Yarmolenko	36	19	24+5	15	2	3	0	0	5	1
20	FW	(Ukraine) UKR	Roman Yaremchuk	9	0	5+3	0	1	0	0	0	0	0
41	FW	(Ukraine) UKR	Artem Besyedin	27	10	13+10	9	1	0	0	0	2+1	1
Players transferred out during the season
1	GK	(Ukraine) UKR	Oleksandr Shovkovskyi	10	0	8	0	0	0	1	0	1	0
2	DF	(Brazil) BRA	Danilo Silva	6	0	5	0	0	0	0	0	1	0
6	DF	(Austria) AUT	Aleksandar Dragović	5	0	4	0	0	0	1	0	0	0
7	FW	(Ukraine) UKR	Oleksandr Hladkyy	11	0	4+4	0	0	0	0	0	0+3	0
11	FW	(Brazil) BRA	Júnior Moraes	24	13	11+5	10	1	2	1	0	4+2	1
20	MF	(Ukraine) UKR	Oleh Husyev	7	1	2+4	1	0	0	0	0	0+1	0
27	DF	(Ukraine) UKR	Yevhen Makarenko	13	1	10	1	0	0	0	0	3	0
77	MF	(Ukraine) UKR	Artem Hromov	12	0	5+4	0	0+1	0	1	0	0+1	0

Source: Competitions

Last updated: 31 May 2017

=== Goalscorers ===
Rank	No.	Pos	Nat	Name	Premier League	Cup	Super Cup	CL	Total
1	10	FW	(Ukraine)	Andriy Yarmolenko	15	3	0	1	19
2	11	FW	(Brazil)	Júnior Moraes	10	2	0	1	13
3	19	MF	(Ukraine)	Denys Harmash	9	1	0	1	11
4	41	FW	(Ukraine)	Artem Besyedin	9	0	0	1	10
5	25	MF	(Paraguay)	Derlis González	3	2	0	1	6
6	15	MF	(Ukraine)	Viktor Tsyhankov	3	1	0	1	5
6	16	MF	(Ukraine)	Serhiy Sydorchuk	4	0	0	1	5
8	9	MF	(Ukraine)	Mykola Morozyuk	4	0	0	0	4
8	24	DF	(Croatia)	Domagoj Vida	3	0	1	0	4
10	29	MF	(Ukraine)	Vitaliy Buyalskyi	1	0	0	1	2
11	5	DF	(Portugal)	Vitorino Antunes	1	0	0	0	1
11	17	MF	(Ukraine)	Serhiy Rybalka	1	0	0	0	1
11	20	MF	(Ukraine)	Oleh Husyev	1	0	0	0	1
11	26	DF	(Ukraine)	Mykyta Burda	1	0	0	0	1
11	27	DF	(Ukraine)	Yevhen Makarenko	1	0	0	0	1
11	32	MF	(Ukraine)	Valeriy Fedorchuk	1	0	0	0	1
11	34	DF	(Ukraine)	Yevhen Khacheridi	1	0	0	0	1
11	44	DF	(Hungary)	Tamás Kádár	0	1	0	0	1
11	48	MF	(Ukraine)	Pavlo Orikhovskyi	1	0	0	0	1

Last updated: 31 May 2017

=== Clean sheets ===
Rank	No.	Pos	Nat	Name	Premier League	Cup	Super Cup	CL	Total
1	72	GK	(Ukraine)	Artur Rudko	4	1	0	2	7
2	35	GK	(Ukraine)	Maksym Koval	2	1	0	0	3
3	1	GK	(Ukraine)	Oleksandr Shovkovskyi	2	0	0	0	2

Last updated: 7 May 2017

=== Disciplinary record ===
No.	Pos	Nat	Player	Premier League			Cup			Super Cup			CL			Total		
No.	Pos	Nat	Player	Booked	(yellow card) (yellow-red card)	Sent off (straight red)	Booked	(yellow card) (yellow-red card)	Sent off (straight red)	Booked	(yellow card) (yellow-red card)	Sent off (straight red)	Booked	(yellow card) (yellow-red card)	Sent off (straight red)	Booked	(yellow card) (yellow-red card)	Sent off (straight red)
4	DF	(Serbia)	Aleksandar Pantić	2	0	0	1	0	0	0	0	0	0	0	0	3	0	0
5	DF	(Portugal)	Vitorino Antunes	2	0	0	1	0	0	0	0	0	0	0	0	3	0	0
7	FW	(Ukraine)	Oleksandr Hladkyy	1	0	0	0	0	0	0	0	0	0	0	0	1	0	0
8	MF	(Ukraine)	Volodymyr Shepelyev	3	0	0	0	0	0	0	0	0	0	0	0	3	0	0
9	MF	(Ukraine)	Mykola Morozyuk	4	0	0	0	0	0	0	0	0	1	0	0	5	0	0
10	FW	(Ukraine)	Andriy Yarmolenko	7	0	0	0	0	0	0	0	0	0	0	0	7	0	0
11	FW	(Brazil)	Júnior Moraes	3	0	1	0	0	0	1	0	0	0	0	0	4	0	1
14	DF	(Ukraine)	Zurab Ochigava	1	0	0	1	0	0	0	0	0	0	0	0	2	0	0
16	MF	(Ukraine)	Serhiy Sydorchuk	5	0	0	2	0	0	1	0	0	1	1	0	9	1	0
17	MF	(Ukraine)	Serhiy Rybalka	2	1	0	0	0	0	0	0	0	1	0	0	3	1	0
18	MF	(Belarus)	Nikita Korzun	0	0	0	0	0	0	0	0	0	2	0	0	2	0	0
19	MF	(Ukraine)	Denys Harmash	8	0	0	1	0	0	0	0	0	2	0	0	11	0	0
20	MF	(Ukraine)	Oleh Husyev	1	0	0	0	0	0	0	0	0	0	0	0	1	0	0
24	DF	(Croatia)	Domagoj Vida	3	0	0	0	0	0	0	0	0	2	0	0	5	0	0
25	MF	(Paraguay)	Derlis González	1	0	0	0	0	0	0	0	0	1	0	0	2	0	0
26	DF	(Ukraine)	Mykyta Burda	2	0	0	0	0	0	0	0	0	1	0	0	3	0	0
27	DF	(Ukraine)	Yevhen Makarenko	0	0	0	0	0	0	0	0	0	1	0	0	1	0	0
29	MF	(Ukraine)	Vitaliy Buyalskyi	1	0	0	0	0	0	0	0	0	0	0	0	1	0	0
32	MF	(Ukraine)	Valeriy Fedorchuk	3	0	0	0	0	0	0	0	0	0	0	0	3	0	0
34	DF	(Ukraine)	Yevhen Khacheridi	3	0	0	1	0	0	1	0	0	1	0	0	6	0	0
35	GK	(Ukraine)	Maksym Koval	1	0	0	0	0	0	0	0	0	0	0	0	0	0	0
41	MF	(Ukraine)	Artem Besyedin	3	0	0	0	0	0	0	0	0	0	0	0	3	0	0
44	DF	(Hungary)	Tamás Kádár	2	0	0	1	0	0	0	0	0	0	0	0	3	0	0

Last updated: 31 May 2017
