= Shandruk =

Shandruk is a surname. Notable people with the surname include:

- Oleh Shandruk (born 1983), Ukrainian footballer and manager
- Pavlo Shandruk, Ukrainian general
- Roman Shandruk, Ukrainian footballer
