= Nedelko =

Nedelko or Nedilko (Russian: Неделько, Ukrainian: Неділько) is a gender-neutral Slavic surname that may refer to

- Danny Nedelko, song about Danny, Nedelko, Ukrainian immigrant to the United Kingdom, by the British punk rock band Idles
- Ivan Nedelko (born 1986), Russian tennis player
- Vitaliy Nedilko (born 1982), Ukrainian football goalkeeper
