= Marchuk =

Marchuk is a Ukrainian patronymic surname from the personal name Marko, a variant of Marcus. Polish-language version: Marczuk. Notable people with the surname include:

- Andriy Marchuk (born 1997), Ukrainian goalkeeper
- Gury Marchuk (1925–2013), Russian mathematician
- Ihor Marchuk (born 1969), Ukrainian politician
- Ivan Marchuk (born 1936), Ukrainian painter
- Russ Marchuk (born 1946), Canadian politician
- Sergey Marchuk (1952–2016), Russian speed skater
- Volodymyr Marchuk (born 1953), Ukrainian painter
- Yevhen Marchuk (1941–2021), Ukrainian politician, Prime Minister (1995–1996)

== See also ==
- Surnames derived from the name Mark
