= Ilnytskyi =

Ilnytskyi (Ukrainian: Ільницький), feminine Ilnytska, is a Ukrainian surname. Notable people with this surname include:

- Roman Ilnytskyi (born 1998), Ukrainian footballer
- Taras Ilnytskyi (born 1983), Ukrainian footballer
- Luka Ilnytskyi (born 1844), Ukrainian community leader

== See also ==
- Ilnicki, a related surname
