= Vladyslav Shapoval =

Ukrainian footballer

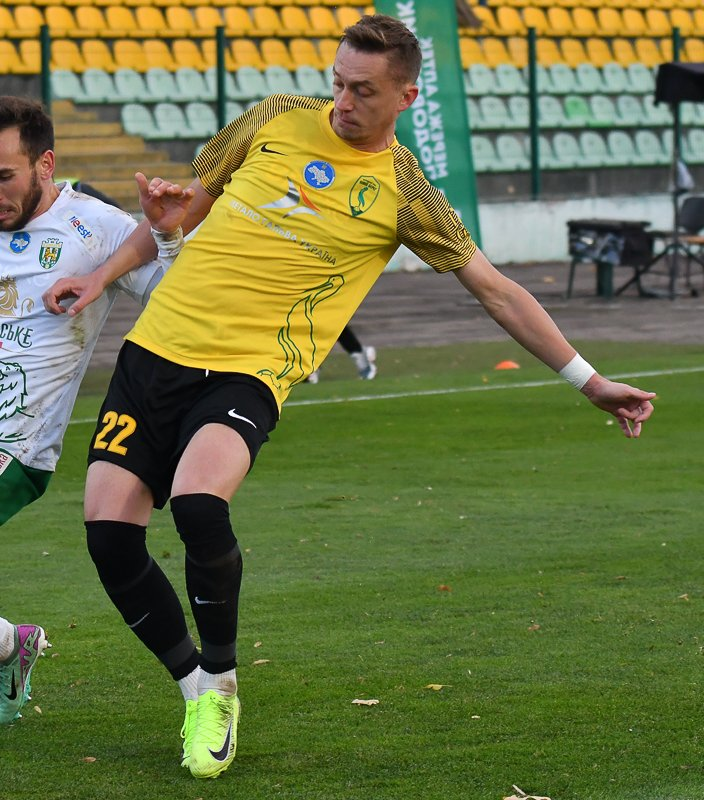

Personal information
- Full name: Vladyslav Fedorovych Shapoval
- Date of birth: 8 May 1995 (age 31)
- Place of birth: Chernihiv, Ukraine
- Height: 1.89 m (6 ft 2 1/2 in)
- Position: Defender

Youth career
- 2008–2012: Yunist Chernihiv
- 2012: Polissya Dobryanka

Senior career*
Years	Team	Apps	(Gls)
2012	Budivel-Enerhiya Ripky	4	(1)
2012–2018	Volyn Lutsk	52	(9)
2018–2020	Dnipro-1	32	(1)
2020	Volyn Lutsk	1	(0)
2021	Ahrobiznes Volochysk	13	(2)
2021–2023	Polissya Zhytomyr	37	(2)
2024	Chornomorets Odesa	2	(0)
2024–2025	Livyi Bereh Kyiv	21	(0)
2025–2026	Kudrivka	7	(2)
2026	→ Chernihiv (loan)	6	(0)
- * Club domestic league appearances and goals as of 9 May 2026

Vladyslav Fedorovych Shapoval (Ukrainian: Владислав Федорович Шаповал; born 8 May 1995) is a Ukrainian professional footballer who plays as a defender.

== Career ==
=== Yunist Chernihiv ===
Shapoval attended the Sportive youth school of FC Yunist Chernihiv in his native city of Chernihiv.

=== Volyn Lutsk ===
He made his debut for FC Volyn Lutsk played as substituted in the game against FC Shakhtar Donetsk on 21 November 2015 in the Ukrainian Premier League.

=== Dnipro-1 ===
In 2018 he moved to Dnipro-1 for two season where he won the Ukrainian First League in the season 2018–19.

=== Ahrobiznes Volochysk ===
On 19 April 2021 he scored his first goal with the new club against Krystal Kherson in Ukrainian First League. On 25 April 2021 he scored against Obolon Kyiv in Ukrainian First League in 2020-21 giving the victory for Ahrobiznes Volochysk.

=== Polissya Zhytomyr ===
In summer 2021 he moved to Polissya Zhytomyr in Ukrainian Second League and on 7 August 2021 he scored his first goal with the new club against Kremin. On 31 August he played in the Ukrainian Cup in the season 2021–22 against Obolon Kyiv for the third preliminary round.

=== Livyi Bereh Kyiv ===
In summer 2024 he moved to Livyi Bereh Kyiv in Ukrainian Premier League. In summer 2025 his contract was ended and it wasn't extended.

=== Kudrivka ===
On 30 June 2025 he signed for Kudrivka just promoted in Ukrainian Premier League. On 17 August 2025 he scored two goals by penalty against Poltava at the Obolon Arena. On 19 August 2025, he was included in the Best XI of Round 3 of the 2025–26 Ukrainian Premier League.

==== Chernihiv ====
On 11 March 2026, he was loaned to Chernihiv until the end of the season. On 22 May 2026, he was selected in the lineup for the 2026 Ukrainian Cup final against Dynamo Kyiv. On 26 June 2026 his loan was ended and he was released by the club.

== Career statistics ==
=== Club ===
As of match played 9 May 2026

Appearances and goals by club, season and competition
Club	Season	League			Cup		Europe		Other		Total	
Club	Season	Division	Apps	Goals	Apps	Goals	Apps	Goals	Apps	Goals	Apps	Goals
Volyn Lutsk	2012–13	Ukrainian Premier League	0	0	0	0	0	0	0	0	0	0
Volyn Lutsk	2013–14	Ukrainian Premier League	0	0	0	0	0	0	0	0	0	0
Volyn Lutsk	2014–15	Ukrainian Premier League	0	0	0	0	0	0	0	0	0	0
Volyn Lutsk	2015–16	Ukrainian Premier League	6	0	0	0	0	0	0	0	6	0
Volyn Lutsk	2016–17	Ukrainian Premier League	25	1	2	0	0	0	0	0	27	1
Volyn Lutsk	2017–18	Ukrainian Premier League	21	8	1	0	0	0	0	0	22	8
Dnipro-1	2018–19	Ukrainian First League	18	0	3	0	0	0	0	0	21	0
Dnipro-1	2019–20	Ukrainian Premier League	14	1	2	0	0	0	0	0	16	1
Volyn Lutsk	2020–21	Ukrainian First League	1	0	1	0	0	0	0	0	2	0
Ahrobiznes Volochysk	2020–21	Ukrainian First League	12	2	1	0	0	0	0	0	13	2
Polissya Zhytomyr	2021–22	Ukrainian First League	14	1	1	0	0	0	0	0	15	1
Polissya Zhytomyr	2022–23	Ukrainian First League	20	0	0	0	0	0	0	0	20	0
Polissya Zhytomyr	2023–24	Ukrainian Premier League	3	0	2	0	0	0	0	0	5	0
Chornomorets Odesa	2023–24	Ukrainian Premier League	2	0	1	0	0	0	0	0	3	0
Livyi Bereh Kyiv	2024–25	Ukrainian Premier League	21	0	0	0	0	0	1	0	22	0
Kudrivka	2025–26	Ukrainian Premier League	7	2	0	0	0	0	0	0	7	2
Chernihiv (loan)	2025–26	Ukrainian First League	6	0	2	0	0	0	—		8	0
Chernihiv (loan)	Total		6	0	2	0	0	0	0	0	8	0
Career total			170	15	16	0	0	0	1	0	187	15

== Honours ==
Dnipro-1

- Ukrainian First League: 2018–19

Polissya Zhytomyr

- Ukrainian First League: 2022–23

Chernihiv

- Ukrainian Cup runner-up: 2025–26
