= Artem Dudik =

Ukrainian footballer

Personal information
- Full name: Artem Rostyslavovych Dudik
- Date of birth: 2 January 1997 (age 29)
- Place of birth: Kamin-Kashyrskyi, Ukraine
- Height: 1.73 m (5 ft 8 in)
- Position: Forward

Youth career
- 2003–2015: Volyn Lutsk

Senior career*
Years	Team	Apps	(Gls)
2015–2017	Volyn Lutsk	30	(4)
2017–2020	Shakhtar Donetsk	0	(0)
2019	→ Slutsk (loan)	27	(4)
2020	→ Mariupol (loan)	1	(0)
2020	Sandecja Nowy Sącz	6	(1)
2021	Ahrobiznes Volochysk	9	(0)
2021–2022	VPK-Ahro Shevchenkivka	14	(0)
2022	Metalist 1925 Kharkiv	3	(0)
2023	Barycz Sułów	14	(2)

International career
2017	Ukraine U21	1	(0)
- * Club domestic league appearances and goals as of 28 July 2024

Artem Rostyslavovych Dudik (Ukrainian: Артем Ростиславович Дудік; born 2 January 1997) is a Ukrainian professional footballer who plays as a forward.

== Club career ==
=== Youth years ===
Dudik is the product of the FC Volyn Lutsk School Systems. His first trainer was Mykola Klyots.

=== Volyn Lutsk ===
He made his debut in the Ukrainian Premier League for FC Volyn Lutsk in a game against FC Metalist Kharkiv on 6 March 2016.

=== Sandecja Nowy Sącz ===
On 26 August 2020, he signed a two-year contract with Polish I liga club Sandecja Nowy Sącz.

== Career statistics ==
As of 20 December 2018

Club	Season	League			Ukrainian Cup		Champions League		Europa League		Ukrainian Super Cup		Total	
Club	Season	Division	Apps	Goals	Apps	Goals	Apps	Goals	Apps	Goals	Apps	Goals	Apps	Goals
Volyn Lutsk	2015–16	Ukrainian Premier League	4	1	2	0	0	0	0	0	0	0	6	1
Volyn Lutsk	2016–17	Ukrainian Premier League	24	3	2	0	0	0	0	0	0	0	24	3
Volyn Lutsk	2017–18	Ukrainian First League	2	0	0	0	0	0	0	0	0	0	2	0
Volyn Lutsk	Total		30	4	4	0	0	0	0	0	0	0	34	4
Shakhtar Donetsk	2017–18	Ukrainian Premier League	0	0	0	0	0	0	0	0	0	0	0	0
Shakhtar Donetsk	2018–19	Ukrainian Premier League	0	0	0	0	0	0	0	0	0	0	0	0
Shakhtar Donetsk	Total		0	0	0	0	0	0	0	0	0	0	0	0
Career total			30	4	4	0	0	0	0	0	0	0	34	4
