= Ilnicki =

Ilnicki (feminine: Ilnicka; plural: Ilniccy) is a Polish surname. Notable people with this surname include:

- Ed Ilnicki (born 1995), Canadian football player
- Jake Ilnicki (born 1992), Canadian rugby player
- Maria Ilnicka (1825–1897), Polish writer and activist
- Maria Ilnicka-Mądry (1946–2023), Polish politician

== See also ==
- Ilnytskyi, a related Ukrainian surname
