= Marczuk =

Marczuk is a Polish surname. Its East Slavic counterpart is Marchuk. Notable people with the surname include:

- Dominik Marczuk (born 2003), Polish footballer
- Weronika Marczuk (born 1971), Polish actress

== See also ==
- Surnames derived from the name Mark
