= Andriy Nykytyuk =

Ukrainian footballer

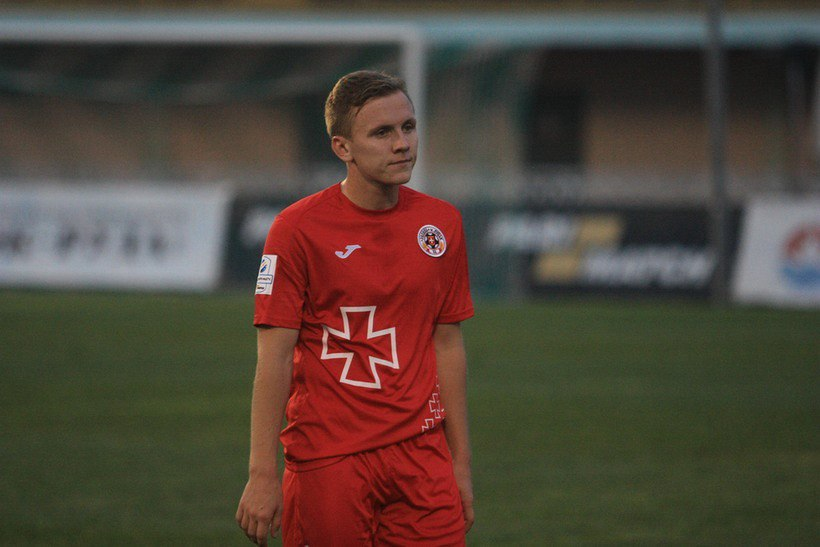

Personal information
- Full name: Andriy Oleksandrovych Nykytyuk
- Date of birth: 16 August 1994 (age 32)
- Place of birth: Volodymyr, Ukraine
- Height: 1.72 m (5 ft 8 in)
- Position: Midfielder

Team information
- Current team: Zviahel
- Number: 21

Youth career
- 2007–2011: BRW-WIK Volodymyr-Volynskyi

Senior career*
Years	Team	Apps	(Gls)
2012–2013	Dynamo Kyiv	0	(0)
2013–2017	Volyn Lutsk	12	(0)
2023–	Zviahel	11	(0)
- * Club domestic league appearances and goals as of 15 June 2024

Andriy Oleksandrovych Nykytyuk (Ukrainian: Андрій Олександрович Никитюк; born 16 August 1994) is a Ukrainian professional football midfielder who plays for Zviahel.

== Career ==
Nykytyuk is a product of the BRW-WIK Volodymyr-Volynskyi Sportive School System. Then he signed a professional contract with FC Dynamo Kyiv and afterwards with FC Volyn Lutsk in the Ukrainian Premier League.

He made his debut in the Ukrainian Premier League for FC Volyn on 14 May 2016, playing in the match against FC Hoverla Uzhhorod.
