= Andriy Lyashenko =

Ukrainian footballer

Personal information
- Full name: Andriy Yuriyovych Lyashenko
- Date of birth: 11 June 1998 (age 28)
- Place of birth: Brody, Ukraine
- Height: 1.75 m (5 ft 9 in)
- Position: Midfielder

Team information
- Current team: Probiy Horodenka
- Number: 11

Youth career
- 2012: Bohun Brody
- 2012–2013: Veres KOLIFKS Kostopil
- 2013–2015: Volyn Lutsk

Senior career*
Years	Team	Apps	(Gls)
2015–2018	Volyn Lutsk	36	(2)
2018	DAC Dunajská Streda	0	(0)
2018–2019	Rukh Vynnyky	4	(1)
2020	Kaganat	1	(0)
2020–2022	Volyn Lutsk	43	(2)
2021	→ Volyn-2 Lutsk	2	(0)
2022–2023	LNZ Cherkasy	13	(0)
2023–2025	Epitsentr Kamianets-Podilskyi	48	(2)
2026–	Probiy Horodenka	2	(0)
- * Club domestic league appearances and goals as of 4 June 2026

Andriy Yuriyovych Lyashenko (Ukrainian: Андрій Юрійович Ляшенко; born 11 June 1998) is a Ukrainian professional footballer who plays as a midfielder for Probiy Horodenka.

Lyashenko is a product of the FC Volyn Youth Sportive School System. Then he signed a professional contract with Volyn Lutsk in the Ukrainian Premier League.

He made his debut in the Ukrainian Premier League for Volyn on 24 July 2016, playing in the match against Dnipro.

On 11 July 2022 he signed for LNZ Cherkasy.

In February 2023 he moved to Epitsentr Dunaivtsi.
