= Serhiy Melinyshyn =

Ukrainian footballer

Personal information
- Full name: Serhiy Vitaliyovych Melinyshyn
- Date of birth: 26 May 1997 (age 29)
- Place of birth: Lviv, Ukraine
- Height: 1.91 m (6 ft 3 in)
- Position: Defender

Team information
- Current team: SC Hermaringen
- Number: 17

Youth career
- 2010–2014: Karpaty Lviv

Senior career*
Years	Team	Apps	(Gls)
2014–2018	Volyn Lutsk	16	(0)
2018	Olimpik Donetsk	1	(0)
2020	Kaganat	1	(0)
2020–2021	Prykarpattia Ivano-Frankivsk	18	(0)
2021–2022	Karpaty Halych	16	(0)
2022	ŁKS Łagów	20	(1)
2022–2024	KS Wiązownica	35	(0)
2024–	SC Hermaringen	29	(20)
- * Club domestic league appearances and goals as of 19:58, 18 June 2025 (UTC)

Serhiy Melinyshyn (Ukrainian: Сергій Віталійович Мелінишин; born 26 May 1997) is a Ukrainian professional footballer who plays as a defender for German club SC Hermaringen.

== Career ==
Melinyshyn is a product of the Sportive youth school of FC Karpaty Lviv.

He made his debut for FC Volyn Lutsk played as a main-squad player in the game against FC Shakhtar Donetsk on 24 September 2016 in the Ukrainian Premier League.
