= Bohdan Hladun =

Ukrainian footballer

Personal information
- Full name: Bohdan Ihorovych Hladun
- Date of birth: 10 June 1999 (age 27)
- Place of birth: Skirche, Volyn Oblast, Ukraine
- Height: 1.82 m (5 ft 11 1/2 in)
- Position: Forward

Team information
- Current team: FC Volyn Lutsk
- Number: 79

Youth career
- 2005–2015: FC Volyn Lutsk

Senior career*
Years	Team	Apps	(Gls)
2015–	FC Volyn Lutsk	1	(0)
- * Club domestic league appearances and goals as of 10 December 2016

Bohdan Hladun (Ukrainian: Богдан Ігорович Гладун; born 10 June 1999) is a professional Ukrainian football striker who currently plays for the Ukrainian Premier League club Volyn Lutsk.

== Career ==
Hladun is a product of the FC Volyn Sportive youth school system from age 6. His first trainer was Valeriy Nazaruk. He made his debut for FC Volyn Lutsk as a substituted player in the game against FC Vorskla Poltava on 10 December 2016 in the Ukrainian Premier League.
