= Viktor Khomchenko =

Ukrainian footballer

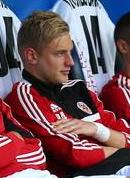

Personal information
- Full name: Viktor Viktorovych Khomchenko
- Date of birth: 11 November 1994 (age 31)
- Place of birth: Lutsk, Ukraine
- Height: 1.88 m (6 ft 2 in)
- Position: Forward

Team information
- Current team: Narew Ostrołęka
- Number: 17

Youth career
- 2007: Kovel
- 2007–2011: Volyn Lutsk

Senior career*
Years	Team	Apps	(Gls)
2011–2016	Volyn Lutsk	26	(2)
2017–2018	Karpaty Lviv	3	(0)
2017–2018	→ Rukh Vynnyky (loan)	26	(6)
2018	Avanhard Kramatorsk	0	(0)
2019	Karpaty Lviv	0	(0)
2019–2020	Hirnyk-Sport Horishni Plavni	21	(4)
2020	Volyn Lutsk	5	(1)
2021	Karpaty Halych	13	(3)
2021	Uzhhorod	19	(4)
2022	Star Starachowice	10	(8)
2022–2024	Cosmos Nowotaniec	53	(24)
2024–	Narew Ostrołęka	21	(9)

International career
2016	Ukraine U21	2	(0)
- * Club domestic league appearances and goals as of 20:16, 24 June 2025 (UTC)

Viktor Viktorovych Khomchenko (Ukrainian: Віктор Вікторович Хомченко; born 11 November 1994) is a Ukrainian professional footballer who plays as a striker for Polish V liga club Narew Ostrołęka.

== Career ==
Khomchenko attended the different Sportive youth schools in Volyn Oblast. He made his debut for FC Volyn Lutsk played as substituted in the game against FC Metalist Kharkiv on 6 April 2013 in the Ukrainian Premier League.

== Honours ==
Cosmos Nowotaniec

- IV liga Subcarpathia: 2022–23
- Polish Cup (Krosno regionals): 2022–23
