= Yuriy Teterenko =

Ukrainian footballer

Personal information
- Full name: Yuriy Ihorovych Teterenko
- Date of birth: 22 January 1997 (age 29)
- Place of birth: Lutsk, Ukraine
- Height: 1.80 m (5 ft 11 in)
- Position: Midfielder

Youth career
- 2003–2012: Youth Sport School #2 Lutsk
- 2012–2013: Volyn Lutsk

Senior career*
Years	Team	Apps	(Gls)
2013–2017	Volyn Lutsk	41	(0)
2018	Atlantas Klaipėda	12	(1)
2019–2020	Slutsk	39	(0)
2020	Volyn Lutsk	8	(0)
2021	Tavriya Simferopol	11	(0)
2023	FC Kovel (amateur)		
2024–	Lutsksantekhmontazh-536 (amateur)		
- * Club domestic league appearances and goals as of 16 June 2021

Yuriy Teterenko (Ukrainian: Юрій Ігорович Тетеренко; born 22 January 1997) is a professional Ukrainian football midfielder.

== Career ==
Teterenko is a product of Youth Sport School #2 and FC Volyn Youth Sportive School Systems. In 2012 he signed a professional contract with FC Volyn Lutsk in the Ukrainian Premier League.

He made his debut in the Ukrainian Premier League for FC Volyn on 13 August 2016, playing in a match against FC Zirka Kropyvnytskyi.

In August 2018 he became member of Lithuanian FK Atlantas Klaipėda and play in A lyga.
