= Serhiy Trykosh =

Ukrainian footballer

Personal information
- Full name: Serhiy Valeriyovych Trykosh
- Date of birth: 12 October 1998 (age 28)
- Place of birth: Ratne, Ukraine
- Height: 1.78 m (5 ft 10 in)
- Position: Midfielder

Team information
- Current team: Nyva Terebovlya

Youth career
- 2013–2014: BRW-BIK Volodymyr-Volynskyi
- 2014–2015: FC Volyn Lutsk

Senior career*
Years	Team	Apps	(Gls)
2015–2017	Volyn Lutsk	3	(0)
2017–2018	Rochyn Sosnivka	4	(0)
2018	Sparta Brodnica		
2019–2020	ODEK Orzhiv	4	(0)
2020	NFK Boratyn	0	(0)
2021–	Nyva Terebovlya	4	(0)
- * Club domestic league appearances and goals as of 17 September 2021

Serhiy Valeriyovych Trykosh (Ukrainian: Сергій Валерійович Трикош; born 12 October 1998) is a Ukrainian professional football midfielder who plays for the Ukrainian amateur club Nyva Terebovlya.

Trykosh is a product of the BRW-BIK Volodymyr-Volynskyi and FC Volyn Youth Sportive School Systems. Then he signed a professional contract with FC Volyn Lutsk in the Ukrainian Premier League.

He made his debut in the Ukrainian Premier League for FC Volyn on 20 May 2017, played in the match against FC Zirka Kropyvnytskyi.
