= Vitaliy Hemeha =

Ukrainian footballer

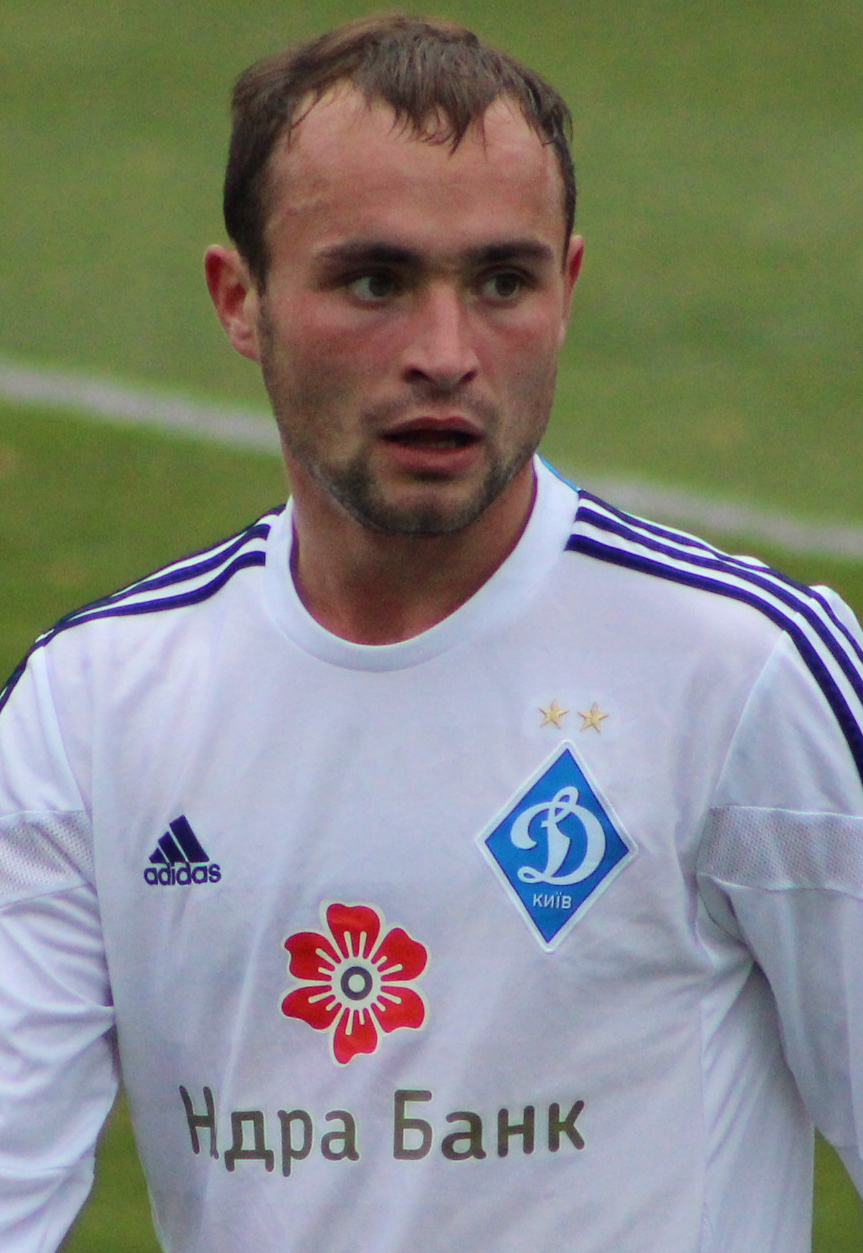
- 2014,

Personal information
- Full name: Vitaliy Anatoliyovych Hemeha
- Date of birth: 10 January 1994 (age 32)
- Place of birth: Stepanky, Vinnytsia Oblast, Ukraine
- Height: 1.76 m (5 ft 9 in)
- Position: Midfielder

Team information
- Current team: Nyva Vinnytsia
- Number: 21

Youth career
- 2001–2005: Nyva Vinnytsia
- 2005–2011: Dynamo Kyiv

Senior career*
Years	Team	Apps	(Gls)
2011–2016	Dynamo Kyiv	0	(0)
2011–2015	→ Dynamo-2 Kyiv	99	(11)
2015–2016	→ Hoverla Uzhhorod (loan)	23	(1)
2016	→ Wisła Płock (loan)	8	(0)
2017	Olimpik Donetsk	4	(0)
2017–2018	Rukh Vynnyky	0	(0)
2018	Nyva Vinnytsia	1	(0)
2020–2022	Nyva Vinnytsia	21	(1)
2023	Dinaz Vyshhorod	9	(0)
2024–2025	Podillya Khmelnytskyi	44	(1)
2026–	Nyva Vinnytsia	0	(0)

International career
2010	Ukraine U16	7	(1)
2009–2011	Ukraine U17	18	(0)
2011–2012	Ukraine U18	12	(0)
2014–2015	Ukraine U21	5	(0)
- * Club domestic league appearances and goals as of 4 June 2026

Vitaliy Anatoliyovych Hemeha (Ukrainian: Віталій Анатолійович Гемега; born 10 January 1994) is a Ukrainian professional footballer who plays as a midfielder for Ukrainian Second League club Nyva Vinnytsia.

== Career ==
Born in Stepanky, a tiny village in Vinnytsia Oblast, Vitaliy began playing football in Vinnytsia, where he attended PFC Nyva Vinnytsia football school. When he was eleven, Hemeha moved to Kyiv, where he began playing for FC Dynamo Kyiv youth and reserve squads.
