= Redvan Memeshev =

Ukrainian footballer

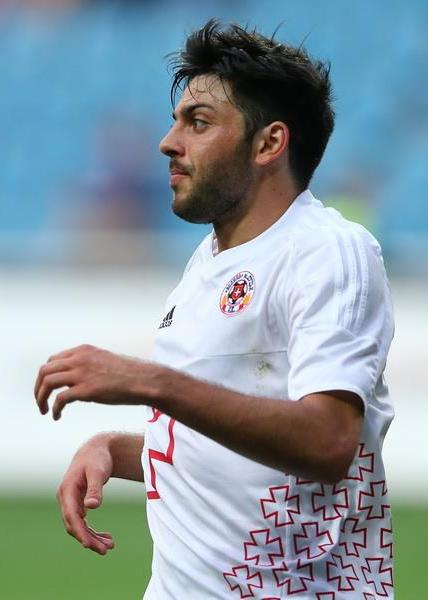

Personal information
- Full name: Redvan Rayimovych Memeshev
- Date of birth: 15 August 1993 (age 33)
- Place of birth: Dzhankoy, Crimea, Ukraine
- Height: 1.84 m (6 ft 1/2 in)
- Position: Forward

Team information
- Current team: Kyzyltash Bakhchisaray
- Number: 7

Youth career
- 2008–2011: Krymteplytsia Molodizhne

Senior career*
| Years | Team | Apps | (Gls) |
| 2011–2013 | Krymteplytsia Molodizhne | 49 | (8) |
| 2013–2017 | Volyn Lutsk | 92 | (19) |
| 2017 | Karpaty Lviv | 2 | (0) |
| 2018 | Dnipro-1 | 11 | (2) |
| 2019 | Slavia Mozyr | 8 | (1) |
| 2019–2020 | Krymteplytsia Molodizhne | 37 | (7) |
| 2021 | Kyran | 19 | (6) |
| 2022 | Yevpatoria | 11 | (1) |
| 2022– | Kyzyltash Bakhchisaray | 61 | (32) |

International career
| 2013–2014 | Ukraine U21 | 13 | (2) |
- * Club domestic league appearances and goals as of 31 December 2024

Redvan Memeshev (Ukrainian: Редван Раїмович Мемешев; born 15 August 1993) is a professional Ukrainian football forward of Crimean Tatar origin who plays for Kyzyltash Bakhchisaray.

== Career ==
Memeshev attended the Sport school of FC Krymteplytsia Molodizhne. He played for the senior FC Krymteplytsia's team in the Ukrainian Premier League and in summer 2013 signed a contract with FC Volyn. Memeshev made his debut for FC Volyn Lutsk played the full-time in the game against FC Dynamo Kyiv on 14 July 2013 in Ukrainian Premier League.
