= Antonio Samac =

Croatian footballer (born 1997)

Personal information
- Full name: Antonio Samac
- Date of birth: 30 July 1997 (age 29)
- Place of birth: Split, Croatia
- Height: 1.80 m (5 ft 11 in)
- Position: Forward

Team information
- Current team: HNK Sloga Mravince

Youth career
- 2007: Dugopolje
- 2007–2011: Hajduk Split
- 2012–2015: RNK Split

Senior career*
| Years | Team | Apps | (Gls) |
| 2016–2017 | RNK Split | 5 | (0) |
| 2016 | → Junak Sinj (loan) | 14 | (2) |
| 2017–2018 | NK Novigrad | 11 | (1) |
| 2018–2019 | Primorac Stobreč | | |
| 2019–2020 | RNK Split | | |
| 2020- | HNK Sloga Mravince | | |
- * Club domestic league appearances and goals as of 25 October 2017

Antonio Samac (born 30 July 1997) is a Croatian footballer currently playing for HNK Sloga Mravince.

== Career ==
Samac, the nephew of the former HNK Hajduk Split and FC Barcelona player Goran Vučević, started his career with NK Dugopolje before moving to the HNK Hajduk Split youth setup aged 10 He moved on to RNK Split aged 14, and featured in the team that won the Croatian U19 title in the 2014/15 season. In early 2016, he was sent on loan to the third-tier NK Junak Sinj until the end of the season along with teammates Marin Roglić and Toni Glavaš. He rejoined the RNK Split senior team the following summer.

In August 2019, Samac returned to RNK Split.
