= Ruslan Marushka =

Ukrainian footballer

Personal information
- Full name: Ruslan Volodymyrovych Marushka
- Date of birth: 23 August 1998 (age 28)
- Place of birth: Lviv, Ukraine
- Height: 1.93 m (6 ft 4 in)
- Position: Defender

Youth career
- 2010–2014: Lviv
- 2014: SKK Demnya
- 2014–2015: Lviv

Senior career*
Years	Team	Apps	(Gls)
2015–2018	Volyn Lutsk	19	(1)
2018	Atlantas Klaipėda	12	(0)
2019–2020	Rukh Vynnyky	18	(0)
2020–2021	Karpaty Halych	11	(0)
2021–2022	Wólczanka Wólka Pełkińska	15	(3)
2022	Bałtyk Koszalin	15	(0)
2022–2023	Wandsbeker TSV Concordia	15	(0)
2024	ETSV Hamburg	14	(2)

International career
2015	Ukraine U18	3	(0)
- * Club domestic league appearances and goals as of 23 August 2024

Ruslan Marushka (Ukrainian: Руслан Володимирович Марушка; born 23 August 1998) is a Ukrainian professional footballer who plays as a defender.

== Career ==
Marushka is a product of the Sportive youth school of FC Lviv.

He made his debut for FC Volyn Lutsk played as a second-time substituted player in the game against FC Dnipro on 22 October 2016 in the Ukrainian Premier League.
