= Roman Zhmurko =

Ukrainian footballer

Personal information
- Full name: Roman Vadymovych Zhmurko
- Date of birth: 27 July 1997 (age 29)
- Place of birth: Ternopil, Ukraine
- Height: 1.94 m (6 ft 4 in)
- Position: Goalkeeper

Team information
- Current team: Livyi Bereh Kyiv
- Number: 12

Youth career
- 2010–2014: UFK-Karpaty Lviv

Senior career*
Years	Team	Apps	(Gls)
2014–2017	Volyn Lutsk	4	(0)
2018	Nyva Ternopil	8	(0)
2019	Anderstorps IF	20	(0)
2020	Kalush	0	(0)
2020–2022	Hirnyk-Sport Horishni Plavni	17	(0)
2022–2025	Epitsentr Kamianets-Podilskyi	25	(0)
2025–	Livyi Bereh Kyiv	24	(0)
- * Club domestic league appearances and goals as of 3 June 2026

Roman Vadymovych Zhmurko (Ukrainian: Роман Вадимович Жмурко; born 27 July 1997) is a Ukrainian professional footballer who plays as a goalkeeper for Livyi Bereh Kyiv.

== Career ==
Zhmurko is a product of UFK-Karpaty Lviv youth sportive systems.

He spent his career in the Ukrainian Premier League Reserves club Volyn Lutsk. In December 2016 Zhmurko was promoted to the main-squad team of Volyn in the Ukrainian Premier League, but only made his debut in the match against Dnipro on 31 May 2017. Volyn lost the match 0:3.

On 19 February 2018 he signed contract with the Ukrainian Second League club Nyva Ternopil. In 2019, Zhmurko joined Swedish 3rd Division club Anderstorps IF. He returned to Ukraine in 2020, joining Kalush, before later moving to Hirnyk-Sport Horishni Plavni at the end of August 2020.
