= Yevhen Kotyun =

Ukrainian footballer

Personal information
- Full name: Yevhen Viktorovych Kotyun
- Date of birth: 31 July 1996 (age 30)
- Place of birth: Lutsk, Ukraine
- Height: 1.86 m (6 ft 1 in)
- Position: Midfielder

Team information
- Current team: Bohun Brody

Youth career
- 2009–2013: Volyn Lutsk

Senior career*
Years	Team	Apps	(Gls)
2014	Laska Boratyn	9	(1)
2015–2017	Volyn Lutsk	5	(0)
2017	→ Podillya Khmelnytskyi (loan)	10	(0)
2018–2021	Votrans Lutsk	14	(0)
2021–	Bohun Brody	2	(0)
- * Club domestic league appearances and goals as of 17 September 2021

Yevhen Viktorovych Kotyun (Ukrainian: Євген Вікторович Котюн; born 31 July 1996) is a Ukrainian professional football midfielder who plays for the amateur Ukrainian club Bohun Brody.

== Career ==
Kotyun is a product of the FC Volyn Youth Sportive School System. Then he signed a professional contract with FC Volyn Lutsk in the Ukrainian Premier League, spent before some time as player in FC Laska Boratyn amateur team.

He made his debut in the Ukrainian Premier League for FC Volyn on 26 November 2016, playing in the match against FC Dynamo Kyiv.
