= Vladyslav Dmytrenko =

Ukrainian footballer

Personal information
- Full name: Vladyslav Mykolayovych Dmytrenko
- Date of birth: 24 May 2000 (age 26)
- Place of birth: Lutsk, Ukraine
- Height: 1.70 m (5 ft 7 in)
- Position: Forward

Team information
- Current team: Metalist 1925 Kharkiv
- Number: 22

Youth career
- 2013–2015: Volyn Lutsk

Senior career*
| Years | Team | Apps | (Gls) |
| 2015–2017 | Volyn Lutsk | 20 | (1) |
| 2018–2019 | Viktoria Köln | 0 | (0) |
| 2019– | Metalist 1925 Kharkiv | 76 | (7) |

International career^{‡}
| 2016 | Ukraine U16 | 7 | (0) |
| 2019 | Ukraine U19 | 1 | (0) |
- * Club domestic league appearances and goals as of 20 June 2024 ‡ National team caps and goals as of 1 September 2022

Vladyslav Dmytrenko (Ukrainian: Владислав Миколайович Дмитренко; born 24 May 2000) is a Ukrainian professional footballer who plays as a striker for Metalist 1925 Kharkiv.

== Career ==
Dmytrenko is a product of the FC Volyn Sportive youth school system. He made his debut for FC Volyn Lutsk played as a substituted player in the game against FC Shakhtar Donetsk on 24 September 2016 in the Ukrainian Premier League.

He is also a member of the different Ukrainian youth representations.
