= Oleksandr Chepelyuk =

Ukrainian footballer (born 1997)

Personal information
- Full name: Oleksandr Ihorovych Chepelyuk
- Date of birth: 5 September 1997 (age 29)
- Place of birth: Lutsk, Ukraine
- Height: 1.85 m (6 ft 1 in)
- Position: Midfielder

Youth career
- 2003–2014: Volyn Lutsk

Senior career*
Years	Team	Apps	(Gls)
2014–2017	Volyn Lutsk	30	(0)
2017–2020	Rukh Lviv	36	(0)
2019–2020	→ Hirnyk-Sport Horishni Plavni (loan)	26	(1)
2020–2021	Hirnyk-Sport Horishni Plavni	24	(2)
2021–2022	Volyn Lutsk	12	(0)
2022–2023	Epitsentr Kamianets-Podilskyi	19	(2)
2023–2024	Skala 1911 Stryi	10	(0)
- * Club domestic league appearances and goals as of 5 July 2024

Oleksandr Chepelyuk (Ukrainian: Олександр Ігорович Чепелюк; born 5 September 1997) is a professional Ukrainian footballer who plays as a midfielder.

Chepelyuk is a product of FC Volyn Youth Sportive School System. His first trainer was Mykola Klyots. Then he signed a professional contract with FC Volyn Lutsk in the Ukrainian Premier League.

He made his debut in the Ukrainian Premier League for FC Volyn on 29 November 2015, playing in a match against FC Metalurh Zaporizhya.
