= Oleh Herasymyuk =

Ukrainian footballer (born 1986)

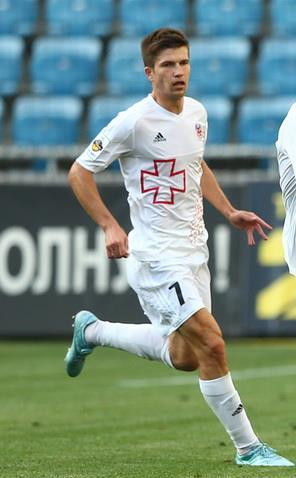

Personal information
- Full name: Oleh Vіktorovych Herasymyuk
- Date of birth: 22 September 1986 (age 40)
- Place of birth: Volodymyr-Volynskyi, Ukrainian SSR
- Height: 1.75 m (5 ft 9 in)
- Position: Midfielder

Youth career
- –2003: Volyn Lutsk

Senior career*
Years	Team	Apps	(Gls)
2003–2004	Volyn Lutsk	6	(2)
2003	→ Kovel-Volyn Kovel	9	(0)
2004	→ Ikva Mlyniv (loan)	8	(1)
2005–2009	Dynamo Kyiv	2	(0)
2005	→ Dynamo-2 Kyiv	1	(0)
2005–2006	→ Volyn Lutsk (loan)	19	(0)
2006–2007	→ Arsenal Kyiv (loan)	16	(0)
2007–2008	→ Dynamo-2 Kyiv	23	(2)
2008	→ Neftchi Baku (loan)	6	(1)
2009	→ Dynamo-2 Kyiv	21	(1)
2010–2012	Volyn Lutsk	55	(4)
2013	Arsenal Kyiv	20	(1)
2014–2015	Hoverla Uzhhorod	21	(0)
2015–2019	Volyn Lutsk	60	(4)

International career
2007	Ukraine (students)		
Medal record
Men's football
Representing Ukraine
Summer Universiade
Gold medal – first place	2007 Bangkok	Team competition
- * Club domestic league appearances and goals as of 27 July 2019

Oleh Vіktorovych Herasymyuk (Ukrainian: Олег Вікторович Герасимюк; born 22 September 1986) is a Ukrainian retired professional footballer who played as a midfielder.

== Career ==
=== Dynamo Kyiv ===
Herasymyuk has been in Dynamo since 2005. He has played in 43 matches in the Vyscha Liha and scored 2 goals. He has also played in 14 in the Persha Liha and scored 1 goal.

=== Neftchi Baku ===
In the summer of 2008, Herasymyuk was bought by Neftchi Baku who recently got Ukrainian coach Anatoliy Demyanenko.

On 19 July 2008, he scored the opening goal in 2–1 win against FC Vaslui in the UEFA Intertoto Cup 2008.

=== National ===
Herasymyuk has been capped for Ukraine's under-17 and under-19 national football teams.

== See also ==
- 2005 FIFA World Youth Championship squads § Ukraine
