= Andriy Marchuk =

Ukrainian footballer

Personal information
- Full name: Andriy Mykolayovych Marchuk
- Date of birth: 25 June 1997 (age 29)
- Place of birth: Lviv, Ukraine
- Height: 1.91 m (6 ft 3 in)
- Position: Goalkeeper

Team information
- Current team: Kulykiv

Youth career
- 2011–2012: Youth Sportive School #4 Lviv
- 2013–2014: Volyn Lutsk

Senior career*
Years	Team	Apps	(Gls)
2014–2018	Volyn Lutsk	15	(0)
2018–2020	Lehin Bryukhovychi	35	(1)
2021	Kulykiv	10	(0)
2021	Halychyna Velykyi Doroshiv	3	(0)
2021–	Kulykiv	1	(0)

International career^{‡}
2014–2015	Ukraine U18	4	(0)
2015–	Ukraine U19	3	(0)
- * Club domestic league appearances and goals as of 17 September 2021 ‡ National team caps and goals as of 22 October 2016

Andriy Mykolayovych Marchuk (Ukrainian: Андрій Миколайович Марчук; born 25 June 1997) is a Ukrainian professional football goalkeeper who plays for the amateur Ukrainian club Kulykiv.

== Career ==
Marchuk is a product of Youth Sportive School #4 in his native Lviv and FC Volyn youth sportive systems.

He spent his career in the Ukrainian Premier League Reserves club FC Volyn Lutsk. And in summer 2016 Marchuk was promoted to the main-squad team of the FC Volyn in the Ukrainian Premier League. He made his debut for Volyn Lutsk in the Ukrainian Premier League in a match against FC Zorya Luhansk on 15 October 2016.
