= Roman Shandruk =

Ukrainian footballer

Personal information
- Full name: Roman Valeriyovych Shandruk
- Date of birth: 29 May 1998 (age 28)
- Place of birth: Ukraine
- Height: 1.79 m (5 ft 10 1/2 in)
- Position: Midfielder

Team information
- Current team: Votrans Lutsk

Youth career
- 2011–2015: FC Volyn Lutsk

Senior career*
Years	Team	Apps	(Gls)
2015–2018	Volyn Lutsk	10	(0)
2018–	Votrans Lutsk	8	(0)
- * Club domestic league appearances and goals as of 17 September 2021

Roman Valeriyovych Shandruk (Ukrainian: Роман Валерійович Шандрук; born 29 May 1998) is a Ukrainian professional football midfielder who plays for the Ukrainian amateur club Votrans Lutsk.

Shandruk is a product of the FC Volyn Youth Sportive School System. Then he signed a professional contract with FC Volyn Lutsk in the Ukrainian Premier League.

He made his debut in the Ukrainian Premier League for FC Volyn on 20 November 2016, playing in the match against FC Zirka Kropyvnytskyi.
