= Miha Goropevšek =

Slovenian footballer

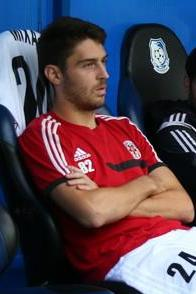

Personal information
- Full name: Miha Goropevšek
- Date of birth: 12 March 1991 (age 35)
- Place of birth: Celje, Slovenia
- Height: 1.93 m (6 ft 4 in)
- Position: Defender

Youth career
- 200?–2011: NK Šampion

Senior career*
Years	Team	Apps	(Gls)
2011–2014	Šampion	66	(3)
2014–2015	Legionovia Legionowo	17	(1)
2015–2017	Volyn Lutsk	35	(1)
2017–2018	Olimpia Grudziądz	17	(1)
2018–2019	Volyn Lutsk	42	(9)
2020	Dinamo Minsk	22	(2)
2021	Chornomorets Odesa	9	(0)
2022–2023	Ethnikos Achna	21	(1)
2023–2024	ASIL Lysi	7	(0)
- * Club domestic league appearances and goals as of 12 March 2024

Miha Goropevšek (born 12 March 1991) is a Slovenian professional footballer who plays as a defender.

== Career ==
Goropevšek began his playing career with Šampion in the Slovenian Third League. He joined Polish club Legionovia Legionowo and in August 2015 signed a contract with the Ukrainian Premier League club FC Volyn.
