= Vitaliy Nedilko =

Ukrainian footballer

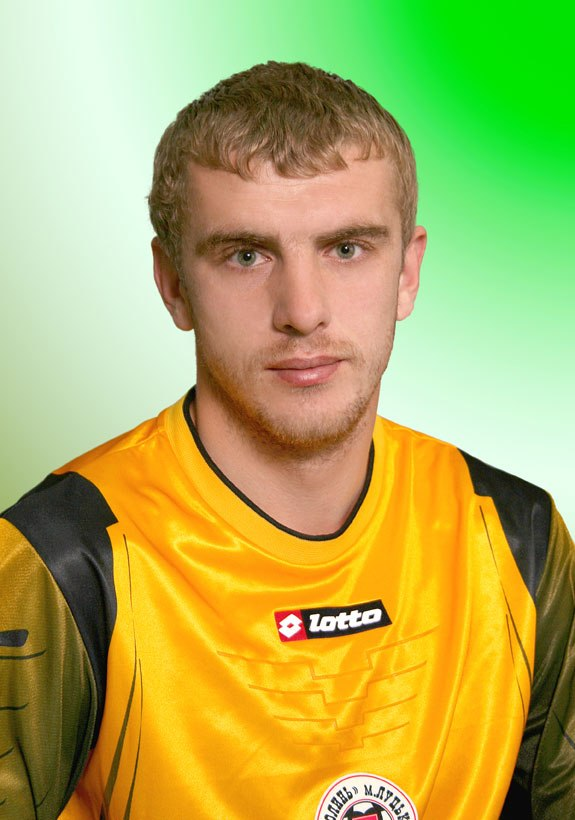

Personal information
- Full name: Vitaliy Mykhaylovych Nedilko
- Date of birth: 21 August 1982 (age 44)
- Place of birth: Sakhnovshchyna, Ukrainian SSR
- Height: 1.90 m (6 ft 3 in)
- Position: Goalkeeper

Senior career*
Years	Team	Apps	(Gls)
2002	Slovkhlib Slovyansk	4	(0)
2003–2021	Volyn Lutsk	214	(0)
2003	→ Kovel-Volyn-2 Kovel (loan)	6	(0)
2004	→ Ikva Mlyniv (loan)	3	(0)
2006	→ Tavriya Simferopol (loan)	0	(0)
- * Club domestic league appearances and goals

Vitaliy Nedilko (Ukrainian: Віталій Михайлович Неділько; born 21 August 1982) is a Ukrainian former professional football goalkeeper.

== Career ==
He made his debut for Volyn Lutsk in the Ukrainian Premier League in a match against FC Metalurh Zaporizhia on 24 May 2003.
