= Roman Ilnytskyi =

Ukrainian footballer

Personal information
- Full name: Roman Andriyovych Ilnytskyi
- Date of birth: 30 January 1998 (age 28)
- Place of birth: Ukraine
- Height: 1.82 m (5 ft 11 1/2 in)
- Position: Midfielder

Team information
- Current team: Orzeł Przeworsk

Youth career
- 2012–2015: Volyn Lutsk

Senior career*
Years	Team	Apps	(Gls)
2015–2018	Volyn Lutsk	9	(0)
2018	Polissya Zhytomyr	0	(0)
2019–2022	Sokół Kolbuszowa Dolna	89	(6)
2025	Sokół Sokołów Małopolski	11	(3)
2025–2026	ŁKS Łowisko	15	(1)
2026–	Orzeł Przeworsk	0	(0)
- * Club domestic league appearances and goals as of 11:32, 5 February 2026 (UTC)

Roman Andriyovych Ilnytskyi (Ukrainian: Роман Андрійович Ільницький; born 30 January 1998) is a Ukrainian professional footballer who plays as a midfielder for Polish club Orzeł Przeworsk.

Ilnytskyi is a product of the Volyn Lutsk youth system. He signed a professional contract with Volyn in the Ukrainian Premier League.

He made his league debut for Volyn on 16 April 2017, in a win against Zirka Kropyvnytskyi.
