= Roman Nykytyuk =

Ukrainian footballer

Personal information
- Full name: Roman Fedorovych Nykytyuk
- Date of birth: 9 September 1993 (age 33)
- Place of birth: Lutsk, Ukraine
- Height: 1.91 m (6 ft 3 in)
- Position: Defender

Team information
- Current team: Votrans Lutsk

Youth career
- 2006–2010: Volyn Lutsk

Senior career*
Years	Team	Apps	(Gls)
2010–2017	Volyn Lutsk	48	(1)
2018–2019	Rukh Lviv	29	(5)
2020	Mynai	9	(0)
2020	Volyn Lutsk	4	(0)
2021	Karpaty Halych	10	(0)
2021–2022	Hirnyk-Sport Horishni Plavni	7	(0)
2022–2023	Lviv	23	(0)
2023	Nyva Vinnytsia	16	(2)
2024	Kolos Polonne	16	(3)
2024	Trostianets	6	(0)
2024–	Votrans Lutsk	0	(0)
- * Club domestic league appearances and goals as of 17 March 2025

Roman Fedorovych Nykytyuk (Ukrainian: Роман Федорович Никитюк; born 9 September 1993) is a Ukrainian professional footballer who plays as a defender for amateur club Votrans Lutsk.

== Career ==
Nykytyuk attended the Sportive youth school of FC Volyn Lutsk. He made his debut for FC Volyn Lutsk played as substituted in the game against FC Zorya Luhansk on 20 April 2014 in Ukrainian Premier League.
