= Naftovyk Stadium =

Stadium in Sumy Oblast, Ukraine

Coordinates: 50°17′55″N 34°53′23″E

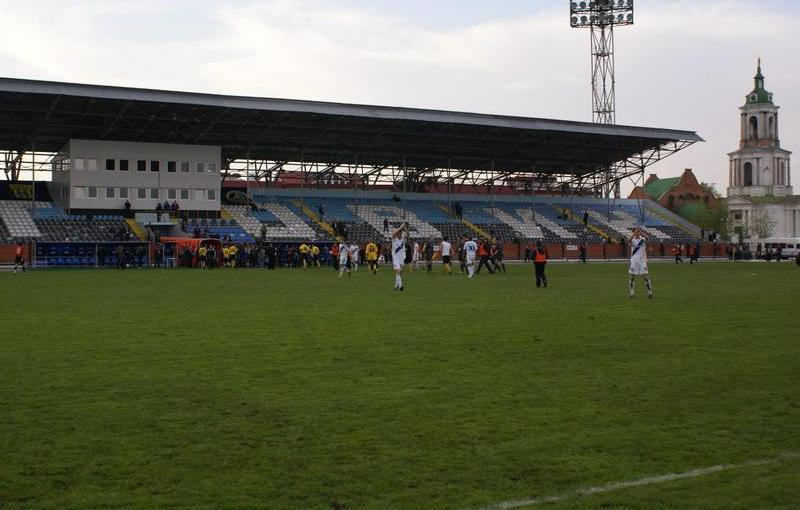
- Interactive map of Naftovyk Stadium
- Location: Okhtyrka, Ukraine
- Owner: FC Naftovyk-Ukrnafta Okhtyrka
- Capacity: 5,256 (football)
- Surface: Grass

Tenant
- FC Naftovyk-Ukrnafta Okhtyrka

Naftovyk Stadium is a multi-use stadium in Okhtyrka, Ukraine. It is currently used mostly for football matches, and is the home of FC Naftovyk-Ukrnafta Okhtyrka. The stadium holds 5,256 people.
