= Dmytro Zaderetskyi =

Ukrainian footballer

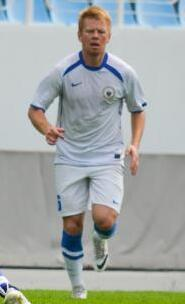

Personal information
- Full name: Dmytro Vadymovych Zaderetskyi
- Date of birth: 3 August 1994 (age 32)
- Place of birth: Chernihiv, Ukraine
- Height: 1.77 m (5 ft 9 1/2 in)
- Position: Defender

Youth career
- 2007–2008: SDYuShOR Desna
- 2009–2011: UFK Kharkiv

Senior career*
Years	Team	Apps	(Gls)
2012	LKT Slavutych (amateurs)	7	(0)
2012–2017	Volyn Lutsk	44	(0)
2015–2016	→ Desna Chernihiv (loan)	20	(1)
2017–2018	Polissya Zhytomyr	8	(0)
2018	Avanhard Kramatorsk	11	(1)
2019	Kremin Kremenchuk	8	(1)
2019–2020	Polissya Zhytomyr	17	(2)
2020–2021	Podillya Khmelnytskyi	10	(0)

International career^{‡}
2015	Ukraine-21	4	(1)
- * Club domestic league appearances and goals as of 3 August 2019 ‡ National team caps and goals as of 23:56, 25 July 2021 (UTC)

Dmytro Zaderetskyi (Ukrainian: Дмитро Вадимович Задерецький; born 3 August 1994) is a professional Ukrainian football defender.

== Career ==
Zaderetskyi attended the Sportive youth school of Desna Chernihiv and UKF Kharkiv. He made his debut for FC Volyn Lutsk and played as a substitute in the game against FC Dynamo Kyiv on 14 July 2013 in the Ukrainian Premier League.

In 2015 he moved to Desna Chernihiv, the main club of Chernihiv his home city. On 15 May 2016 he scored against Sumy in Ukrainian First League at the Yuvileiny Stadium in Sumy.

== International career ==
He was called up for Ukraine-21 national team in 2014 by Volodymyr Horilyi.

== Outside of professional football ==
According to the YouTube channel Bombardyr, during the Siege of Chernihiv, Dmytro Zaderetskyi, a former player of Desna Chernihiv and Volyn, is defending his hometown with weapons in his hands. According to the football player, all his relatives are currently in Chernihiv, in particular, his father works as a firefighter.

== Career statistics ==
=== Club ===
As of match played 3 April 2022

Appearances and goals by club, season and competition
Club	Season	League			Cup		Europe		Other		Total	
Club	Season	Division	Apps	Goals	Apps	Goals	Apps	Goals	Apps	Goals	Apps	Goals
Volyn Lutsk	2012–13	Ukrainian Premier League	0	0	0	0	0	0	0	0	0	0
Volyn Lutsk	2013–14	Ukrainian Premier League	16	0	0	0	0	0	0	0	16	0
Volyn Lutsk	2014–15	Ukrainian Premier League	3	0	1	0	0	0	0	0	4	0
Volyn Lutsk	2015–16	Ukrainian Premier League	0	0	2	0	0	0	0	0	2	0
Desna Chernihiv (loan)	2015–16	Ukrainian First League	20	1	0	0	0	0	0	0	20	1
Volyn Lutsk	2016–17	Ukrainian Premier League	26	0	2	0	0	0	0	0	28	0
Polissya Zhytomyr	2017–18	Ukrainian Second League	8	0	0	0	0	0	0	0	8	0
Avanhard Kramatorsk	2018–19	Ukrainian First League	11	1	0	0	0	0	0	0	11	1
Kremin Kremenchuk	2018–19	Ukrainian Second League	8	1	1	0	0	0	0	0	9	1
Polissya Zhytomyr	2019–20	Ukrainian Second League	17	2	0	0	0	0	0	0	17	2
Podillya Khmelnytskyi	2020–21	Ukrainian Second League	10	0	1	0	0	0	0	0	11	0
Career total			119	5	7	0	0	0	0	0	126	5

=== International ===
As of match played 3 April 2022

Ukraine Under 21
Year	Apps	Goals
2015	4	1
Total	4	1

== Honours ==
Podillya Khmelnytskyi

- Ukrainian Second League: 2020–21

Polissya Zhytomyr

- Ukrainian Second League: 2019–20

Kremin Kremenchuk

- Ukrainian Second League: 2018–19
