= 2018–19 FC Oleksandriya season =

FC Oleksandriya
2018–19 season
- President: Serhiy Kuzmenko
- Manager: Volodymyr Sharan
- Stadium: CSC Nika
- Ukrainian Premier League: 3rd
- Ukrainian Cup: Round of 32 (1/16)
- Top goalscorer: League: Yevhen Banada (9); All: Yevhen Banada (9)
| Home colours | Away colours | Third colours |

The 2018–19 season was 7th season in the top Ukrainian football league for FC Oleksandriya. Oleksandriya competed in Premier League, Ukrainian Cup.

== Players ==
=== Squad information ===
As of 31 May 2019

| Squad no. | Name | Nationality | Position | Date of birth (age) |
Goalkeepers
| 21 | Dmytro Rudyk | (Ukraine) | GK | 26 August 1992 (aged 26) |
| 24 | Vladyslav Levanidov | (Ukraine) | GK | 23 February 1993 (aged 26) |
| 79 | Yuriy Pankiv | (Ukraine) | GK | 3 November 1984 (aged 34) |
Defenders
| 2 | Dmytro Semenov | (Ukraine) | DF | 4 November 1999 (aged 19) |
| 3 | Stanislav Mykytsey | (Ukraine) | DF | 7 September 1989 (aged 29) |
| 4 | Vladyslav Babohlo ^{List B} | (Ukraine) | DF | 14 November 1998 (aged 20) |
| 11 | Andriy Tsurikov | (Ukraine) | DF | 12 November 1995 (aged 23) |
| 20 | Pavel Pashayev | (Azerbaijan) (Ukraine) | DF | 4 January 1988 (aged 31) |
| 26 | Anton Shendrik | (Ukraine) | DF | 26 May 1986 (aged 33) |
| 55 | Kyrylo Prokopchuk ^{List B} | (Ukraine) | DF | 14 February 1998 (aged 21) |
| 98 | Tymur Stetskov ^{List B} | (Ukraine) | DF | 27 January 1998 (aged 21) |
| | Vladyslav Shkinder ^{List B} | (Ukraine) | DF | 29 December 1998 (aged 20) |
Midfielders
| 6 | Kyrylo Kovalets | (Ukraine) | MF | 2 July 1993 (aged 25) |
| 7 | Yevhen Protasov ^{List B} | (Ukraine) | MF | 23 July 1997 (aged 21) |
| 8 | Oleksiy Dovhyi | (Ukraine) | MF | 2 November 1989 (aged 29) |
| 13 | Hlib Bukhal | (Ukraine) | MF | 12 November 1995 (aged 23) |
| 14 | Artem Polyarus | (Ukraine) | MF | 5 July 1992 (aged 26) |
| 15 | Andriy Zaporozhan (Captain) | (Ukraine) | MF | 21 March 1983 (aged 36) |
| 16 | Kyrylo Dryshlyuk ^{List B} | (Ukraine) | MF | 16 September 1999 (aged 19) |
| 17 | Valeriy Luchkevych (on loan from Standard Liège) | (Ukraine) | MF | 11 January 1996 (aged 23) |
| 22 | Vasyl Hrytsuk | (Ukraine) | MF | 21 November 1987 (aged 31) |
| 23 | Dmytro Shastal | (Ukraine) | MF | 30 December 1995 (aged 23) |
| 27 | Dmytro Hrechyshkin | (Ukraine) | MF | 22 September 1991 (aged 27) |
| 44 | Yevhen Banada | (Ukraine) | MF | 29 February 1992 (aged 27) |
| 69 | Denys Dedechko | (Ukraine) | MF | 2 July 1987 (aged 31) |
| 94 | Maksym Zaderaka | (Ukraine) | MF | 7 September 1994 (aged 24) |
| | Maksym Kulish ^{List B} | (Ukraine) | MF | 31 January 1999 (aged 20) |
| | Serhiy Rusyan ^{List B} | (Ukraine) | MF | 5 August 1999 (aged 19) |
Forwards
| 9 | Vitaliy Ponomar | (Ukraine) | FW | 31 May 1990 (aged 29) |
| 10 | Denys Ustymenko ^{List B} | (Ukraine) | FW | 12 April 1999 (aged 20) |
| 18 | Artem Sitalo | (Ukraine) | FW | 1 August 1989 (aged 29) |
| 19 | Vadym Hranchar ^{List B} | (Ukraine) | FW | 7 March 1998 (aged 21) |
| 39 | Vladyslav Kulach (on loan from Shakhtar Donetsk) | (Ukraine) | MF | 7 May 1993 (aged 26) |
| 74 | Victor César ^{List B} | (Brazil) | FW | 30 March 2000 (aged 19) |
| | Orest Tkachuk ^{List B} | (Ukraine) | FW | 6 January 1998 (aged 21) |
| | Yevhen Verkholantsev ^{List B} | (Ukraine) | FW | 28 January 1998 (aged 21) |

== Transfers ==
=== In ===
| Date | Pos. | Player | Age | Moving from | Type | Fee | Source |
Summer
| 15 June 2018 | MF | (Ukraine) Maksym Zaderaka | 23 | (Ukraine) Stal Kamianske | Transfer | Undisclosed | |
| 20 June 2018 | MF | (Ukraine) Kyrylo Kovalets | 24 | (Ukraine) Chornomorets Odesa | Transfer | Undisclosed | |
| 18 July 2018 | DF | (Ukraine) Hlib Bukhal | 22 | (Ukraine) FC Lviv | Transfer | Undisclosed | |
| 20 July 2018 | DF | (Ukraine) Dmytro Semenov | 18 | (Ukraine) FC Dnipro | Transfer | Undisclosed | |
| 29 August 2018 | MF | (Ukraine) Kyrylo Kostenko | 19 | (Ukraine) Stal Kamianske | Transfer | Undisclosed | |
| 3 September 2018 | MF | (Ukraine) Kyrylo Dryshlyuk | 18 | (Ukraine) Zirka Kropyvnytskyi | Transfer | Undisclosed | |
| 3 September 2018 | FW | (Brazil) Victor César | 18 | Unknown | Transfer | Undisclosed | |
| 25 September 2018 | MF | (Ukraine) Dmytro Hrechyshkin | 27 | (Ukraine) Shakhtar Donetsk | Transfer | Free | |
Winter
| 1 January 2019 | MF | (Ukraine) Denys Dedechko | 31 | (Russia) SKA-Khabarovsk | Transfer | Free | |
| 4 January 2019 | MF | (Ukraine) Valeriy Luchkevych | 22 | (Belgium) Standard Liège | Loan | | |
| 20 February 2019 | FW | (Ukraine) Vladyslav Kulach | 22 | (Ukraine) Shakhtar Donetsk | Loan | | |

=== Out ===
| Date | Pos. | Player | Age | Moving to | Type | Fee | Source |
Summer
| 12 June 2018 | DF | (Ukraine) Andriy Hitchenko | 33 | (Ukraine) Desna Chernihiv | Transfer | Undisclosed | |
| 18 June 2018 | DF | (Ukraine) Serhiy Chebotayev | 30 | (Ukraine) SC Dnipro-1 | Transfer | Undisclosed | |
| 23 June 2018 | MF | (Ukraine) Serhiy Starenkyi | 33 | (Ukraine) Desna Chernihiv | Transfer | Free | |
| 10 July 2018 | MF | (Ukraine) Vitaliy Koltsov | 24 | (Ukraine) Olimpik Donetsk | Transfer | Undisclosed | |
| 2 August 2018 | MF | (Ukraine) Andriy Batsula | 26 | (Belgium) Kortrijk | Transfer | Undisclosed | |
| 31 May 2018 | DF | (Ukraine) Hlib Bukhal | 22 | (Ukraine) FC Lviv | Loan return | | |
| 31 May 2018 | MF | (Ukraine) Oleksiy Zinkevych | 21 | (Ukraine) Shakhtar Donetsk | Loan return | | |
Winter
| 23 January 2019 | DF | (Ukraine) Valeriy Bondarenko | 24 | (Ukraine) Shakhtar Donetsk | Transfer | Undisclosed | |
| 20 February 2019 | MF | (Ukraine) Vadym Vitenchuk | 22 | (Ukraine) MFC Mykolaiv | Transfer | Undisclosed | |

== Pre-season and friendlies ==
| 27 June 2018 Friendly | Beroe Stara Zagora (Bulgaria) | 1–0 | (Ukraine) FC Oleksandriya | Razlog, Bulgaria |
| 17:00 EEST (UTC+03:00) | Tsonev 34' | Report | | Stadium: Septemvri Stadium |

| 29 June 2018 Friendly | Cherno More Varna (Bulgaria) | 1–1 | (Ukraine) FC Oleksandriya | Bansko, Bulgaria |
| 17:00 EEST (UTC+03:00) | Jorginho 51' | Report | Protasov 19' | Stadium: Evima Football Agency field |

| 1 July 2018 Friendly | FC Oleksandriya (Ukraine) | Cancelled | (Armenia) Banants Yerevan | Bulgaria |
| EEST (UTC+03:00) | | Report |

| 1 July 2018 Friendly | FC Oleksandriya (Ukraine) | 5–0 | (Serbia) Dinamo Vranje | Bansko, Bulgaria |
| 15:00 EEST (UTC+03:00) | Sitalo 16', 18'; Shastal 26'; Mykytsey 62'; Prokopchuk 68' | Report | | Stadium: Evima Football Agency field |

| 2 July 2018 Friendly | FC Oleksandriya (Ukraine) | 1–1 | (Cyprus) Anorthosis Famagusta | Bansko, Bulgaria |
| 17:00 EEST (UTC+03:00) | Sitalo 61' | Report | Kacharava 65' | Stadium: Evima Football Agency field |

| 5 July 2018 Friendly | Levski Sofia (Bulgaria) | 1–0 | (Ukraine) FC Oleksandriya | Sofia, Bulgaria |
| 18:30 EEST (UTC+03:00) | Obertan 20' | Report | | Stadium: Georgi Asparuhov Stadium |

| 7 July 2018 Friendly | Lokomotiv Plovdiv (Bulgaria) | Cancelled | (Ukraine) FC Oleksandriya | Bulgaria |
| EEST (UTC+03:00) | | Report |

| 15 July 2018 Friendly | FC Oleksandriya (Ukraine) | 2–1 | (Ukraine) Kremin Kremenchuk | Oleksandriya |
| 14:00 EEST (UTC+03:00) | Banada 39', 45+2' | Report | Sydorenko 35' | Stadium: CSC Nika Stadium |

| 8 August 2018 Friendly | FC Oleksandriya (Ukraine) | 3–0 | (Ukraine) Kremin Kremenchuk | Oleksandriya |
| 17:00 EEST (UTC+03:00) | Ponomar 11'; Semenov 57' (pen.); Hloba 90' | Report | | Stadium: CSC Nika Stadium |

| 8 September 2018 Friendly | Vorskla Poltava (Ukraine) | 5–4 | (Ukraine) FC Oleksandriya | Poltava |
| 16:00 EEST (UTC+03:00) | Kulach 21'; Careca 25'; Odaryuk 55'; Kolomoyets 75'; Mysyk 84' | Report | Kovalets 4'; Shastal 17', 23'; Hrytsuk 45' | Stadium: Ltava Stadium |

| 26 January 2019 Friendly | FC Oleksandriya (Ukraine) | 0–2 | (Bulgaria) Botev Vratsa | Alanya, Turkay |
| 16:00 EET (UTC+02:00) | | Report | Domovchiyski 5'; Bojinov 71' | Stadium: Goldcity |

| 28 January 2019 Friendly | FC Oleksandriya (Ukraine) | 0–2 | (Poland) Arka Gdynia | Alanya, Turkay |
| 16:00 EET (UTC+02:00) | | Report | Zarandia 60'; Siemaszko 83' | Stadium: Goldcity |

| 30 January 2019 Friendly | FC Oleksandriya (Ukraine) | Cancelled | (Bulgaria) Cherno More Varna | Turkay |
| EET (UTC+02:00) | | Report |

| 1 February 2019 Friendly | FC Oleksandriya (Ukraine) | 2–0 | (Armenia) Pyunik Yerevan | Alanya, Turkay |
| 16:30 EET (UTC+02:00) | Ponomar 29'; Dedechko 45' | Report | | Stadium: Goldcity |

| 2 February 2019 Friendly | FC Oleksandriya (Ukraine) | 3–2 | (North Macedonia) Vardar Skopje | Alanya, Turkay |
| 16:00 EET (UTC+02:00) | Shastal 4'; Sitalo 47'; Polyarus 83' | Report | Micevski 53'; Willian Lira 67' | Stadium: Goldcity |

| 11 February 2019 Friendly | FC Oleksandriya (Ukraine) | 1–2 | (Bosnia and Herzegovina) Željezničar Sarajevo | Belek, Turkay |
| 18:00 EET (UTC+02:00) | Ponomar 90' | Report | Krpić 80'; Zajmović 86' | Stadium: Susesi |

| 14 February 2019 Friendly | FC Oleksandriya (Ukraine) | 2–1 | (Uzbekistan) Navbahor Namangan | Belek, Turkay |
| 15:00 EET (UTC+02:00) | Banada 11'; Ponomar 70' | Report | Turayev 25' | Stadium: Susesi |

| 17 February 2019 Friendly | FC Oleksandriya (Ukraine) | 0–1 | (Belarus) Shakhtyor Soligorsk | Belek, Turkay |
| 16:00 EET (UTC+02:00) | | Report | Balanovich 25' | Stadium: Susesi |

| 20 February 2019 Friendly | FC Oleksandriya (Ukraine) | 4–0 | (Ukraine) Obolon-Brovar Kyiv | Belek, Turkay |
| 18:00 EET (UTC+02:00) | Ponomar 14'; Sitalo 21'; Kulach 28'; Luchkevych 90' | Report | | Stadium: Susesi |

| 27 March 2019 Friendly | FC Oleksandriya (Ukraine) | 3–1 | (Ukraine) Kremin Kremenchuk | Oleksandriya |
| 15:00 EET (UTC+02:00) | Hrechyshkin 22' (pen.); Kovalets 59'; Zaporozhan 72' (pen.) | Report | Stepanchuk 84' | Stadium: CSC Nika Stadium |

== Competitions ==
=== Overall ===
| Competition | First match | Last match | Starting round | Final position | Record | | | | | | | |
| Competition | First match | Last match | Starting round | Final position | Pld | W | D | L | GF | GA | GD | Win % |
|---|---|---|---|---|---|---|---|---|---|---|---|---|
| Premier League | 22 July 2018 | 30 May 2019 | Matchday 1 | 3rd | 32 | 14 | 7 | 11 | 39 | 34 | +5 | 43.75 |
| Cup | 26 September 2018 | 26 September 2018 | Round of 32 (1/16) | Round of 32 (1/16) | 1 | 0 | 0 | 1 | 0 | 3 | −3 | 0.00 |
| Total | | | | | 33 | 14 | 7 | 12 | 39 | 37 | +2 | 42.42 |

Last updated: 31 May 2019
Source: Competitions

=== Premier League ===
==== League table ====
| Pos | Team | Pld | W | D | L | GF | GA | GD | Pts | Qualification or relegation |
|---|---|---|---|---|---|---|---|---|---|---|
| 1 | Shakhtar Donetsk (C) | 32 | 26 | 5 | 1 | 73 | 11 | +62 | 83 | Qualification for the Champions League group stage |
| 2 | Dynamo Kyiv | 32 | 22 | 6 | 4 | 54 | 18 | +36 | 72 | Qualification for the Champions League third qualifying round |
| 3 | FC Oleksandriya | 32 | 14 | 7 | 11 | 39 | 34 | +5 | 49 | Qualification for the Europa League group stage (Note: Since the winners of the 2018–19 Ukrainian Cup, Shakhtar Donetsk, qualified for European competition based on league position, the spot awarded to the cup winners (Europa League group stage) was passed to the third-placed team, the spot awarded to the third-placed team (Europa League third qualifying round) was passed to the fourth-placed team, and the spot awarded to the fourth-placed team (Europa League second qualifying round) was passed to the fifth-placed team.) |
| 4 | FC Mariupol | 32 | 12 | 7 | 13 | 36 | 47 | −11 | 43 (Note: Head to Head: Mariupol – Zorya +3=0-1, advantage Mariupol.) | Qualification for the Europa League third qualifying round |
| 5 | Zorya Luhansk | 32 | 11 | 10 | 11 | 39 | 34 | +5 | 43 | Qualification for the Europa League second qualifying round |

Source: Ukrainian Premier League (in Ukrainian), UEFA, Soccerway
Rules for classification: 1) Points; 2) Head-to-head points; 3) Head-to-head goal difference; 4) Head-to-head higher number of goals scored; 5) Goal difference; 6) Higher number of goals scored; 7) Draw or "golden match" if tied for title (Article 22, paragraph 3).
(C) Champions
Notes:

Teams that placed 10th and 11th in the 2018–19 Ukrainian Premier League play two-leg play-off with the second and third teams of the 2018–19 Ukrainian First League. The draw for play-offs took place on 24 May 2019 and the games will be played on 4 and 8 June 2019.

| Team 1 | Agg. | Team 2 | 1st leg | 2nd leg |
|---|---|---|---|---|
| Chornomorets Odesa | 0 – 2 | Kolos Kovalivka | 0 – 0 | 0 – 2 |
| Karpaty Lviv | 3 – 1 | Volyn Lutsk | 0 – 0 | 3 – 1 |

=== First leg ===
4 June 2019
19:00 UTC+3

| Chornomorets Odesa | 0 – 0 | Kolos Kovalivka |
|---|---|---|
| | Report |

Chornomorets Stadium, Odesa
Attendance: 5,435
Referee: Anatoliy Abdula (Kharkiv)

4 June 2019
19:00 UTC+3

| Karpaty Lviv | 0 – 0 | Volyn Lutsk |
|---|---|---|
| | Report |

Ukraina Stadium, Lviv
Attendance: 10,104
Referee: Denys Shurman (Vyshneve)

=== Second leg ===
8 June 2019
17:00 UTC+3

| Kolos Kovalivka | 2 – 0 | Chornomorets Odesa |
|---|---|---|
| Havrysh 57', 63' (pen.) | Report |

Kolos Stadium, Kovalivka
Attendance: 2,500
Referee: Vitaliy Romanov

Kolos Kovalivka won 2–0 on aggregate and were promoted to the 2019–20 Ukrainian Premier League. Chornomorets Odesa were relegated to the 2019–20 Ukrainian First League

8 June 2019
19:00 UTC+3

| Volyn Lutsk | 0 – 3 ~~1 – 3~~ | Karpaty Lviv |
|---|---|---|
| Kozhanov 42' | Report | Klyots 37'; Ponde 82' (pen.); Miroshnichenko 90+5' |

Avanhard Stadium, Lutsk
Attendance: 5,200
Referee: Maksym Kozyryatskyi

Karpaty Lviv won 3–0 on aggregate and retained their spot in the 2019–20 Ukrainian Premier League. Volyn Lutsk remained in the 2019–20 Ukrainian First League

Due to fan violence at the game and attack on referee, the original score 1–3 was scratched and replaced with technical score 0–3 loss to Volyn and win for Karpaty. Additionally, the Lutsk department of police started criminal proceedings on the fact of intentional damage to property during the game by the Karpaty fans.

==== Results summary ====
| Overall | | | | | | | | Home | | | | | | Away | | | | | |
| Pld | W | D | L | GF | GA | GD | Pts | W | D | L | GF | GA | GD | W | D | L | GF | GA | GD |
|---|---|---|---|---|---|---|---|---|---|---|---|---|---|---|---|---|---|---|---|
| 32 | 14 | 7 | 11 | 39 | 34 | +5 | 49 | 7 | 3 | 6 | 17 | 18 | −1 | 7 | 4 | 5 | 22 | 16 | +6 |

Last updated: 31 May 2019.
Source: Competitive matches

==== Results by round ====
| Round | 1 | 2 | 3 | 4 | 5 | 6 | 7 | 8 | 9 | 10 | 11 | 12 | 13 | 14 | 15 | 16 | 17 | 18 | 19 | 20 | 21 | 22 | 23 | 24 | 25 | 26 | 27 | 28 | 29 | 30 | 31 | 32 |
|---|---|---|---|---|---|---|---|---|---|---|---|---|---|---|---|---|---|---|---|---|---|---|---|---|---|---|---|---|---|---|---|---|
| Ground | A | H | A | H | A | H | A | H | A | A | H | H | A | H | A | H | A | H | A | H | H | A | H | A | H | H | A | A | H | A | A | H |
| Result | W | W | W | W | L | W | D | L | L | W | W | W | D | D | W | W | W | L | L | D | D | W | L | W | W | L | D | L | L | D | L | L |
| Position | 2 | 2 | 1 | 1 | 2 | 2 | 2 | 2 | 3 | 3 | 3 | 3 | 3 | 3 | 3 | 2 | 2 | 3 | 3 | 3 | 3 | 3 | 3 | 3 | 3 | 3 | 3 | 3 | 3 | 3 | 3 | 3 |

Updated to match(es) played on 31 May 2019. Source: Competitive matches
A = Away; H = Home; W = Win; D = Draw; L = Loss

==== Matches ====
| 22 July 2018 1 | Karpaty Lviv | 0–2 | FC Oleksandriya | Lviv |
| 17:00 EEST (UTC+03:00) | Carrascal (yellow card) 16'; Holodyuk (yellow card) 40' | Report | Banada (yellow card) 18'; Tsurikov 72'; Ponomar 81'; Zaderaka (yellow card) 82' | Stadium: Ukraina Stadium; Attendance: 6,796; Referee: Dmytro Kutakov |

| 28 July 2018 2 | FC Oleksandriya | 1–0 | Zorya Luhansk | Oleksandriya |
| 17:00 EEST (UTC+03:00) | Banada 85' | Report | | Stadium: CSC Nika Stadium; Attendance: 2,110; Referee: Ievgenii Aranovskyi |

| 5 August 2018 3 | Desna Chernihiv | 0–2 | FC Oleksandriya | Chernihiv |
| 19:30 EEST (UTC+03:00) | Mostovyi (yellow card) 41'; Lyulka (yellow card) 48'; Ohirya (yellow card) 76'; Khlyobas (yellow card) 84'; Starenkyi (yellow card) 90+1' | Report | Banada 6'; Bondarenko 53'; Polyarus (yellow card) 61' | Stadium: Chernihiv Stadium; Attendance: 4,080; Referee: Maksym Kozyryatskyi |

| 12 August 2018 4 | FC Oleksandriya | 1–0 | Arsenal Kyiv | Oleksandriya |
| 17:00 EEST (UTC+03:00) | Zaporozhan (yellow card) 26'; Shendrik (yellow card) 34'; Tsurikov 58'; Ponomar (yellow card) 84'; Dovhyi (yellow card) 89' | Report | Yebli (yellow card) 48'; Orikhovskyi (yellow card) 66'; Piris (yellow card) 89' | Stadium: CSC Nika Stadium; Attendance: 2,460; Referee: Dmytro Kryvushkin |

| 18 August 2018 5 | Dynamo Kyiv | 1–0 | FC Oleksandriya | Kyiv |
| 19:30 EEST (UTC+03:00) | Morozyuk (yellow card) 42'; Tsyhankov 68'; Pivarić (yellow card) 86' | Report | Bondarenko (yellow card) 15'; Dovhyi (yellow card) 62' | Stadium: NSC Olimpiyskiy; Attendance: 11,635; Referee: Vitaliy Romanov |

| 25 August 2018 6 | FC Oleksandriya | 2–0 | Vorskla Poltava | Oleksandriya |
| 17:00 EEST (UTC+03:00) | Banada 15', 17'; Protasov (yellow card) 50' | Report | Artur (yellow card) 24'; Sharpar (yellow card) 32'; Rebenok (yellow card) 40'; Chyzhov (yellow card) 60'; Kravchenko (yellow card) 62' | Stadium: CSC Nika Stadium; Attendance: 2,260; Referee: Maksym Kozyryanskyi |

| 2 September 2018 7 | FC Lviv | 2–2 | FC Oleksandriya | Lviv |
| 17:00 EEST (UTC+03:00) | Bruno Duarte 8', (yellow card) 9'; Lucas Taylor 21'; Holikov (yellow card) 47'; Kalenchuk (yellow card) 88' | Report | Hrytsuk 54'; Sitalo (yellow card) 75', (goal) 83' | Stadium: Arena Lviv; Attendance: 2,748; Referee: Mykola Kryvonosov |

| 15 September 2018 8 | FC Oleksandriya | 0–2 | Shakhtar Donetsk | Oleksandriya |
| 14:00 EEST (UTC+03:00) | Tsurikov (yellow card) 17' | Report | Marlos 26'; Stepanenko (yellow card) 37'; Rakitskiy (yellow card) 67'; Kovalenko 87' | Stadium: CSC Nika Stadium; Attendance: 5,010; Referee: Yaroslav Kozyk |

| 22 September 2018 9 | FC Mariupol | 1–0 | FC Oleksandriya | Mariupol |
| 14:00 EEST (UTC+03:00) | Fomin 8', (yellow card) 24'; Ihnatenko (yellow card) 21'; Bykov (yellow card) 90+3' | Report | Zaporozhan (yellow card) 84' | Stadium: Volodymyr Boiko Stadium; Attendance: 25; Referee: Mykola Kryvonosov |

| 29 September 2018 10 | Olimpik Donetsk | 2–3 | FC Oleksandriya | Kyiv |
| 14:00 EEST (UTC+03:00) | Koltsov 11'; Politylo 29'; Zubeyko (yellow card) 72'; Snurnitsyn (yellow card) 87' | Report | Shastal 25', (yellow card) 52'; Stetskov (yellow card) 28'; Bondarenko (yellow card) 70'; Banada 74'; Hrytsuk 88' (pen.) | Stadium: Dynamo Stadium; Attendance: 191; Referee: Anatoliy Abdula |

| 6 October 2018 11 | FC Oleksandriya | 3–2 | Chornomorets Odesa | Oleksandriya |
| 17:00 EEST (UTC+03:00) | Banada (yellow card) 24', (goal) 70'; Pashayev (yellow card) 41'; Kovalets 44', (yellow card) 77'; Bondarenko (yellow card) 47'; Shastal 56' | Report | Hrachov 18', (yellow card) 54'; Savchenko (yellow card) 28'; Leonov (yellow card) 51'; Musolitin (yellow card) 55'; Tatarkov 80' | Stadium: CSC Nika Stadium; Attendance: 1,501; Referee: Ihor Paskhal |

| 21 October 2018 12 | FC Oleksandriya | 2–1 | Karpaty Lviv | Oleksandriya |
| 19:30 EEST (UTC+03:00) | Shastal 11'; Kovalets 41'; Zaporozhan (yellow card) 74'; Shendrik (yellow card) 90+4' | Report | Carrascal (yellow card) 18'; Boroday (yellow card) 23'; Hutsulyak 54', (yellow card) 68'; Fedetskyi (yellow card) 90+3'; Di Franco (yellow card) 90+3' | Stadium: CSC Nika Stadium; Attendance: 1,606; Referee: Kateryna Monzul |

| 27 October 2018 13 | Zorya Luhansk | 0–0 | FC Oleksandriya | Zaporizhia |
| 17:00 EEST (UTC+03:00) | Mayboroda (yellow card) 84' | Report | | Stadium: Slavutych-Arena; Attendance: 1,829; Referee: Yuriy Mozharovskyi |

| 4 November 2018 14 | FC Oleksandriya | 1–1 | Desna Chernihiv | Oleksandriya |
| 14:00 EET (UTC+02:00) | Banada (yellow card) 31'; Zaporozhan 53' (pen.), (yellow card) 65'; Shendrik (yellow card) 67'; Ponomar (yellow card) 70'; Dovhyi (yellow card) 79' | Report | Koberidze (yellow card) 50'; Artem Favorov (yellow card) 71'; Hitchenko 87' | Stadium: CSC Nika Stadium; Attendance: 1,378; Referee: Volodymyr Novokhatniy |

| 10 November 2018 15 | Arsenal Kyiv | 0–3 | FC Oleksandriya | Kyiv |
| 19:30 EET (UTC+02:00) | Dubinchak (yellow card) 23'; Jevtoski (yellow card) 38' | Report | Shastal 33'; Shendrik (yellow card) 61'; Sitalo 82'; Kovalets 90+1' | Stadium: Dynamo Stadium; Attendance: 632; Referee: Anatoliy Abdula |

| 25 November 2018 16 | FC Oleksandriya | 2–1 | Dynamo Kyiv | Oleksandriya |
| 19:30 EET (UTC+02:00) | Tsurikov 3'; Zaderaka (yellow card) 31'; Zaporozhan 57' (pen.), (yellow card) 90+1'; Sitalo (yellow card) 59'; Kovalets (yellow card) 68' | Report | Shaparenko (yellow card) 4'; Shepelyev (yellow card) 21'; Verbič 33'; Kędziora (yellow card) 39'; Sydorchuk (yellow card) 54'; Boyko (yellow card) 56'; Kádár (yellow card) 69' | Stadium: CSC Nika Stadium; Attendance: 2,478; Referee: Ihor Paskhal |

| 3 December 2018 17 | Vorskla Poltava | 0–1 | FC Oleksandriya | Poltava |
| 17:00 EET (UTC+02:00) | Artur (yellow card) 14'; Chesnakov (yellow card) 19'; Sapay (yellow card) 51'; Perduta (yellow card) 74'; Sklyar (yellow card) 78'; Kulach (yellow card) 81' | Report | Kovalets 4', (yellow card) 73'; Mykytsey (yellow card) 17'; Banada (yellow card) 55' | Stadium: Vorskla Stadium; Attendance: 951; Referee: Vitaliy Romanov |

| 9 December 2018 18 | FC Oleksandriya | 1–2 | FC Lviv | Oleksandriya |
| 17:00 EET (UTC+02:00) | Bondarenko (yellow card) 51'; Shendrik 84', (yellow card) 85'; Shastal (yellow card) 90+4' | Report | Adamyuk 2', 30'; Voronin (yellow card) 7'; Sabino (yellow card) 55'; Marthã (yellow card) 57'; Borzenko (yellow card) 90+4'; Bandura (yellow card) 90+5' | Stadium: CSC Nika Stadium; Attendance: 1,400; Referee: Maksym Kozyryatskyi |

| 25 February 2019 19 | Shakhtar Donetsk | 2–0 | FC Oleksandriya | Kharkiv |
| 19:00 EET (UTC+02:00) | Kryvtsov (yellow card) 11'; Marlos 14'; Moraes 35' | Report | Stetskov (yellow card) 25'; Dedechko (yellow card) 55'; Sitalo (yellow card) 88' | Stadium: OSC Metalist; Attendance: 2,899; Referee: Yaroslav Kozyk |

| 3 March 2019 20 | FC Oleksandriya | 1–1 | FC Mariupol | Oleksandriya |
| 17:00 EET (UTC+02:00) | Zaporozhan (yellow card) 25'; Banada 90' | Report | Zubkov 14', (yellow card) 19'; Demiri (yellow card) 40'; Ihnatenko (yellow card) 74' | Stadium: CSC Nika Stadium; Attendance: 1,405; Referee: Dmytro Kutakov |

| 10 March 2019 21 | FC Oleksandriya | 1–1 | Olimpik Donetsk | Oleksandriya |
| 19:30 EET (UTC+02:00) | Dedechko (yellow card) 41'; Kovalets (yellow card) 54', (goal) 69'; Zaderaka (yellow card) 59'; Banada (yellow card) 80'; Polyarus (yellow card) 90+2' | Report | Do Couto (yellow card) 79' (yellow-red card) 83'; Dieye 88' | Stadium: CSC Nika Stadium; Attendance: 1,063; Referee: Serhiy Boyko |

| 16 March 2018 22 | Chornomorets Odesa | 0–3 | FC Oleksandriya | Odesa |
| 14:00 EET (UTC+02:00) | Arzhanov (yellow card) 44'; Koval (red card) 54'; Musolitin (yellow card) 76'; Babenko (yellow card) 81' | Report | Sitalo 5', 39'; Babohlo (yellow card) 10', (goal) 32'; Luchkevych (yellow card) 11'; Hrechyshkin (yellow card) 86' | Stadium: Chornomorets Odesa; Attendance: 4,285; Referee: Mykola Balakin |

| 3 April 2019 23 | FC Oleksandriya | 0–1 | Shakhtar Donetsk | Oleksandriya |
| 17:00 EEST (UTC+03:00) | Tsurikov (yellow card) 11'; Hrechyshkin (yellow card) 37'; Shendrik (yellow card) 81'; Sitalo (yellow card) 90+4' | Report | Moraes 12' (pen.), (yellow card) 37'; Alan Patrick (yellow card) 30'; Kovalenko (yellow card) 35'; Stepanenko (yellow card) 60'; Taison (yellow card) 90+4' | Stadium: CSC Nika Stadium; Attendance: 3,278; Referee: Denys Shurman |

| 13 April 2019 24 | FC Lviv | 1–2 | FC Oleksandriya | Lviv |
| 19:30 EEST (UTC+03:00) | Bruno Duarte (yellow card) 31', (goal) 72'; Lipe Veloso (yellow card) 37' (yellow-red card) 73'; Pryimak (red card) 90+4' | Report | Polyarus (yellow card) 21', (goal) 49'; Luchkevych 58'; Ponomar (yellow card) 90+4' | Stadium: Ukraina Stadium; Attendance: 949; Referee: Oleksandr Derdro |

| 24 April 2019 25 | FC Oleksandriya | 2–1 | FC Mariupol | Oleksandriya |
| 17:00 EEST (UTC+03:00) | Banada 20'; Hrechyshkin 32' (pen.); Zaporozhan (yellow card) 65' | Report | Yavorskyi (yellow card) 19'; Vakula 23'; Zubkov (yellow card) 62'; Bykov (yellow card) 65'; Pikhalyonok (yellow card) 82'; Boryachuk (yellow card) 84'; Fomin (yellow card) 86' | Stadium: CSC Nika Stadium; Attendance: 1,402; Referee: Anatoliy Abdula |

| 28 April 2019 26 | FC Oleksandriya | 0–2 | Zorya Luhansk | Oleksandriya |
| 17:00 EEST (UTC+03:00) | Babohlo (yellow card) 39' | Report | Mykhaylychenko (yellow card) 36'; Hromov 41', 62'; Chaykovskyi (yellow card) 50'; Vernydub (yellow card) 82' | Stadium: CSC Nika Stadium; Attendance: 1,900; Referee: Yuriy Ivanov |

| 4 May 2019 27 | Dynamo Kyiv | 1–1 | FC Oleksandriya | Kyiv |
| 17:00 EEST (UTC+03:00) | Kravchenko (yellow card) 45'; Rusyn 65' | Report | Luchkevych 8'; Babohlo (yellow card) 36'; Hrechyshkin (yellow card) 89' | Stadium: NSC Olimpiyskiy; Attendance: 14,671; Referee: Maksym Kozyruatskyi |

| 11 May 2019 28 | Shakhtar Donetsk | 2–1 | FC Oleksandriya | Kharkiv |
| 19:30 EEST (UTC+03:00) | Khocholava 4'; Bolbat (yellow card) 13'; Moraes 59'; Stepanenko (yellow card) 87' | Report | Banada 32'; Sitalo (yellow card) 46'; Stetskov (yellow card) 54'; Bukhal (yellow card) 90+1' | Stadium: OSC Metalist; Attendance: 5,174; Referee: Yuriy Mozharovskyi |

| 19 May 2019 29 | FC Oleksandriya | 0–1 | FC Lviv | Oleksandriya |
| 14:00 EEST (UTC+03:00) | Babohlo (yellow card) 36'; Banada (yellow card) 73' | Report | Nasonov (yellow card) 49'; Pedro Vitor 58', (yellow card) 61'; Bruno Duarte (yellow card) 62'; Pernambuco (yellow card) 74' | Stadium: CSC Nika Stadium; Attendance: 1,656; Referee: Denys Shurman |

| 22 May 2019 30 | FC Mariupol | 1–1 | FC Oleksandriya | Mariupol |
| 17:00 EEST (UTC+03:00) | Polehenko (yellow card) 10'; Pikhalyonok 28'; Yavorskyi (red card) 44' | Report | Zaporozhan 45' (pen.); Zaderaka (yellow card) 54' | Stadium: Volodymyr Boiko Stadium; Attendance: 1,987; Referee: Yevhen Aranovskyi |

| 26 May 2019 31 | Zorya Luhansk | 3–1 | FC Oleksandriya | Zaporizhia |
| 19:30 EEST (UTC+03:00) | Vernydub (yellow card) 22'; Hromov 30', (yellow card) 58'; Lunyov 44'; Khomchenovskyi 68'; Chaykovskyi (yellow card) 74'; Silas (yellow card) 83' | Report | Hrechyshkin (yellow card) 6'; Dovhyi 12'; Luchkevych (yellow card) 20'; Bukhal (yellow card) 49'; Babohlo (yellow card) 58' | Stadium: Slavutych-Arena; Attendance: 1,985; Referee: Dmytro Bondarenko |

| 30 May 2019 32 | FC Oleksandriya | 0–2 | Dynamo Kyiv | Oleksandriya |
| 19:30 EEST (UTC+03:00) | Bukhal (yellow card) 20'; Babohlo (yellow card) 26'; Ponomar (yellow card) 85' | Report | Tsyhankov 21', 69'; Alibekov (yellow card) 24' (yellow-red card) 32' | Stadium: CSC Nika Stadium; Attendance: 3,517; Referee: Yuriy Mozharovskyi |

=== Ukrainian Cup ===
| 26 September 2018 Round of 32 | Chornomorets Odesa | 3–0 | FC Oleksandriya | Odesa |
| 19:00 EEST (UTC+03:00) | Chorniy 43' (pen.), 83'; Smirnov (yellow card) 62'; Koval 74' | Report | Vitenchuk (yellow card) 45+2'; Semenov (yellow card) 59'; Hrechyshkin (yellow card) 80' | Stadium: Chornomorets Odesa; Attendance: 3,200; Referee: Oleksandr Omelchenko |

== Statistics ==
=== Appearances and goals ===
| No. | Pos | Nat | Player | Total | | Premier League | | Cup | |
| No. | Pos | Nat | Player | Apps | Goals | Apps | Goals | Apps | Goals |
Goalkeepers
| 21 | GK | (Ukraine) UKR | Dmytro Rudyk | 1 | 0 | 1 | 0 | 0 | 0 |
| 24 | GK | (Ukraine) UKR | Vladyslav Levanidov | 1 | 0 | 0 | 0 | 1 | 0 |
| 79 | GK | (Ukraine) UKR | Yuriy Pankiv | 31 | 0 | 31 | 0 | 0 | 0 |
Defenders
| 2 | DF | (Ukraine) UKR | Dmytro Semenov | 1 | 0 | 0 | 0 | 1 | 0 |
| 3 | DF | (Ukraine) UKR | Stanislav Mykytsey | 16 | 0 | 11+4 | 0 | 1 | 0 |
| 4 | DF | (Ukraine) UKR | Vladyslav Babohlo | 13 | 1 | 12 | 1 | 1 | 0 |
| 11 | DF | (Ukraine) UKR | Andriy Tsurikov | 24 | 3 | 22+2 | 3 | 0 | 0 |
| 20 | DF | (Azerbaijan) AZE | Pavel Pashayev | 22 | 0 | 21+1 | 0 | 0 | 0 |
| 26 | DF | (Ukraine) UKR | Anton Shendrik | 26 | 1 | 26 | 1 | 0 | 0 |
| 98 | DF | (Ukraine) UKR | Tymur Stetskov | 7 | 0 | 5+2 | 0 | 0 | 0 |
Midfielders
| 6 | MF | (Ukraine) UKR | Kyrylo Kovalets | 26 | 5 | 22+4 | 5 | 0 | 0 |
| 7 | MF | (Ukraine) UKR | Yevhen Protasov | 20 | 0 | 10+10 | 0 | 0 | 0 |
| 8 | MF | (Ukraine) UKR | Oleksiy Dovhyi | 15 | 1 | 6+8 | 1 | 1 | 0 |
| 13 | MF | (Ukraine) UKR | Hlib Bukhal | 6 | 0 | 5 | 0 | 1 | 0 |
| 14 | MF | (Ukraine) UKR | Artem Polyarus | 22 | 1 | 19+3 | 1 | 0 | 0 |
| 15 | MF | (Ukraine) UKR | Andriy Zaporozhan | 24 | 3 | 23+1 | 3 | 0 | 0 |
| 17 | MF | (Ukraine) UKR | Valeriy Luchkevych | 13 | 2 | 13 | 2 | 0 | 0 |
| 22 | MF | (Ukraine) UKR | Vasyl Hrytsuk | 7 | 2 | 3+4 | 2 | 0 | 0 |
| 23 | MF | (Ukraine) UKR | Dmytro Shastal | 22 | 4 | 11+11 | 4 | 0 | 0 |
| 27 | MF | (Ukraine) UKR | Dmytro Hrechyshkin | 20 | 1 | 15+4 | 1 | 1 | 0 |
| 44 | MF | (Ukraine) UKR | Yevhen Banada | 30 | 9 | 27+3 | 9 | 0 | 0 |
| 69 | MF | (Ukraine) UKR | Denys Dedechko | 8 | 0 | 4+4 | 0 | 0 | 0 |
| 94 | MF | (Ukraine) UKR | Maksym Zaderaka | 26 | 0 | 16+10 | 0 | 0 | 0 |
| | MF | (Ukraine) UKR | Maksym Kulish | 1 | 0 | 0 | 0 | 1 | 0 |
Forwards
| 9 | FW | (Ukraine) UKR | Vitaliy Ponomar | 25 | 1 | 8+16 | 1 | 1 | 0 |
| 10 | FW | (Ukraine) UKR | Denys Ustymenko | 3 | 0 | 0+2 | 0 | 1 | 0 |
| 18 | FW | (Ukraine) UKR | Artem Sitalo | 29 | 4 | 22+7 | 4 | 0 | 0 |
| 19 | FW | (Ukraine) UKR | Vadym Hranchar | 1 | 0 | 0 | 0 | 1 | 0 |
| | FW | (Ukraine) UKR | Orest Tkachuk | 1 | 0 | 0 | 0 | 0+1 | 0 |
| | FW | (Ukraine) UKR | Yevhen Verkholantsev | 1 | 0 | 0 | 0 | 0+1 | 0 |
Players transferred out during the season
| 5 | DF | (Ukraine) UKR | Valeriy Bondarenko | 18 | 1 | 18 | 1 | 0 | 0 |
| 29 | DF | (Ukraine) UKR | Andriy Batsula | 1 | 0 | 1 | 0 | 0 | 0 |
| | MF | (Ukraine) UKR | Vadym Vitenchuk | 1 | 0 | 0 | 0 | 1 | 0 |

Source: Competitions

Last updated: 31 May 2019

=== Goalscorers ===
| Rank | No. | Pos | Nat | Name | Premier League | Cup | Total |
|---|---|---|---|---|---|---|---|
| 1 | 44 | MF | (Ukraine) | Yevhen Banada | 9 | 0 | 9 |
| 2 | 6 | MF | (Ukraine) | Kyrylo Kovalets | 5 | 0 | 5 |
| 3 | 18 | FW | (Ukraine) | Artem Sitalo | 4 | 0 | 4 |
| 3 | 23 | MF | (Ukraine) | Dmytro Shastal | 4 | 0 | 4 |
| 5 | 11 | DF | (Ukraine) | Andriy Tsurikov | 3 | 0 | 3 |
| 5 | 15 | MF | (Ukraine) | Andriy Zaporozhan | 3 | 0 | 3 |
| 7 | 17 | MF | (Ukraine) | Valeriy Luchkevych | 2 | 0 | 2 |
| 7 | 22 | MF | (Ukraine) | Vasyl Hrytsuk | 2 | 0 | 2 |
| 9 | 4 | DF | (Ukraine) | Vladyslav Babohlo | 1 | 0 | 1 |
| 9 | 5 | DF | (Ukraine) | Valeriy Bondarenko | 1 | 0 | 1 |
| 9 | 8 | MF | (Ukraine) | Oleksiy Dovhyi | 1 | 0 | 1 |
| 9 | 9 | FW | (Ukraine) | Vitaliy Ponomar | 1 | 0 | 1 |
| 9 | 14 | MF | (Ukraine) | Artem Polyarus | 1 | 0 | 1 |
| 9 | 26 | DF | (Ukraine) | Anton Shendrik | 1 | 0 | 1 |
| 9 | 27 | MF | (Ukraine) | Dmytro Hrechyshkin | 1 | 0 | 1 |
| | | | | Own goal | 0 | 0 | 0 |
| | | | | Total | 39 | 0 | 39 |

Last updated: 26 May 2019

=== Clean sheets ===
| Rank | No. | Pos | Nat | Name | Premier League | Cup | Total |
|---|---|---|---|---|---|---|---|
| 1 | 79 | GK | (Ukraine) | Yuriy Pankiv | 9 | 0 | 9 |
| | | | | Total | 9 | 0 | 9 |

Last updated: 31 May 2019

=== Disciplinary record ===
| No. | Pos | Nat | Player | Premier League | | | Cup | | | Total | | |
| No. | Pos | Nat | Player | Booked | (yellow card) (yellow-red card) | Sent off (straight red) | Booked | (yellow card) (yellow-red card) | Sent off (straight red) | Booked | (yellow card) (yellow-red card) | Sent off (straight red) |
| 2 | DF | (Ukraine) | Dmytro Semenov | 0 | 0 | 0 | 1 | 0 | 0 | 1 | 0 | 0 |
| 3 | DF | (Ukraine) | Stanislav Mykytsey | 1 | 0 | 0 | 0 | 0 | 0 | 1 | 0 | 0 |
| 4 | DF | (Ukraine) | Vladyslav Babohlo | 6 | 0 | 0 | 0 | 0 | 0 | 6 | 0 | 0 |
| 5 | DF | (Ukraine) | Valeriy Bondarenko | 4 | 0 | 0 | 0 | 0 | 0 | 4 | 0 | 0 |
| 6 | MF | (Ukraine) | Kyrylo Kovalets | 4 | 0 | 0 | 0 | 0 | 0 | 4 | 0 | 0 |
| 7 | MF | (Ukraine) | Yevhen Protasov | 1 | 0 | 0 | 0 | 0 | 0 | 1 | 0 | 0 |
| 8 | MF | (Ukraine) | Oleksiy Dovhyi | 3 | 0 | 0 | 0 | 0 | 0 | 3 | 0 | 0 |
| 9 | FW | (Ukraine) | Vitaliy Ponomar | 4 | 0 | 0 | 0 | 0 | 0 | 4 | 0 | 0 |
| 11 | DF | (Ukraine) | Andriy Tsurikov | 2 | 0 | 0 | 0 | 0 | 0 | 2 | 0 | 0 |
| 13 | MF | (Ukraine) | Hlib Bukhal | 3 | 0 | 0 | 0 | 0 | 0 | 3 | 0 | 0 |
| 14 | MF | (Ukraine) | Artem Polyarus | 3 | 0 | 0 | 0 | 0 | 0 | 3 | 0 | 0 |
| 15 | MF | (Ukraine) | Andriy Zaporozhan | 7 | 0 | 0 | 0 | 0 | 0 | 7 | 0 | 0 |
| 17 | MF | (Ukraine) | Valeriy Luchkevych | 2 | 0 | 0 | 0 | 0 | 0 | 2 | 0 | 0 |
| 18 | FW | (Ukraine) | Artem Sitalo | 5 | 0 | 0 | 0 | 0 | 0 | 5 | 0 | 0 |
| 20 | DF | (Azerbaijan) | Pavel Pashayev | 1 | 0 | 0 | 0 | 0 | 0 | 1 | 0 | 0 |
| 23 | MF | (Ukraine) | Dmytro Shastal | 2 | 0 | 0 | 0 | 0 | 0 | 2 | 0 | 0 |
| 26 | DF | (Ukraine) | Anton Shendrik | 6 | 0 | 0 | 0 | 0 | 0 | 6 | 0 | 0 |
| 27 | MF | (Ukraine) | Dmytro Hrechyshkin | 4 | 0 | 0 | 1 | 0 | 0 | 5 | 0 | 0 |
| 44 | MF | (Ukraine) | Yevhen Banada | 6 | 0 | 0 | 0 | 0 | 0 | 6 | 0 | 0 |
| 69 | MF | (Ukraine) | Denys Dedechko | 2 | 0 | 0 | 0 | 0 | 0 | 2 | 0 | 0 |
| 94 | MF | (Ukraine) | Maksym Zaderaka | 4 | 0 | 0 | 0 | 0 | 0 | 4 | 0 | 0 |
| 98 | DF | (Ukraine) | Tymur Stetskov | 3 | 0 | 0 | 0 | 0 | 0 | 3 | 0 | 0 |
| | MF | (Ukraine) | Vadym Vitenchuk | 0 | 0 | 0 | 1 | 0 | 0 | 1 | 0 | 0 |
| | | | Total | 73 | 0 | 0 | 3 | 0 | 0 | 76 | 0 | 0 |

Last updated: 31 May 2019
