= 2017–18 FC Oleksandriya season =

FC Oleksandriya
2017-18 season
- President: Serhiy Kuzmenko
- Manager: Volodymyr Sharan
- Stadium: CSC Nika
- Ukrainian Premier League: 7th
- Ukrainian Cup: Round of 16 (1/8)
- UEFA Europa League: Play off round
- Top goalscorer: League: Serhiy Starenkyi (7); All: Serhiy Starenkyi (8)
Home colours	Away colours	Third colours

The 2017–18 season was 6th season in the top Ukrainian football league for FC Oleksandriya. Oleksandriya competed in Premier League, Ukrainian Cup and UEFA Europa League.

== Players ==
=== Squad information ===
As of 31 May 2018

Squad no.	Name	Nationality	Position	Date of birth (age)
Goalkeepers
21	Dmytro Rudyk	(Ukraine)	GK	26 August 1992 (aged 25)
24	Vladyslav Levanidov	(Ukraine)	GK	23 February 1993 (aged 25)
79	Yuriy Pankiv	(Ukraine)	GK	3 November 1984 (aged 33)
Defenders
2	Serhiy Chebotayev	(Ukraine)	DF	7 March 1988 (aged 30)
4	Vladyslav Babohlo ^{List B}	(Ukraine)	DF	14 November 1998 (aged 19)
5	Valeriy Bondarenko	(Ukraine)	DF	3 February 1994 (aged 24)
11	Andriy Tsurikov	(Ukraine)	DF	12 November 1995 (aged 22)
13	Hlib Bukhal (on loan from FC Lviv)	(Ukraine)	DF	5 October 1992 (aged 25)
17	Andriy Hitchenko	(Ukraine)	DF	2 October 1984 (aged 33)
20	Pavlo Pashayev	(Azerbaijan) (Ukraine)	DF	4 January 1988 (aged 30)
23	Vladyslav Shkinder ^{List B}	(Ukraine)	DF	29 December 1998 (aged 19)
26	Anton Shendrik	(Ukraine)	DF	26 May 1986 (aged 32)
29	Andriy Batsula	(Ukraine)	DF	6 February 1992 (aged 26)
98	Tymur Stetskov ^{List B}	(Ukraine)	DF	27 January 1998 (aged 20)
	Ivan Havrushko ^{List B}	(Ukraine)	DF	7 July 1998 (aged 19)
	Kyrylo Prokopchuk ^{List B}	(Ukraine)	DF	14 February 1998 (aged 20)
Midfielders
7	Yevhen Protasov ^{List B}	(Ukraine)	MF	23 July 1997 (aged 20)
8	Oleksiy Dovhyi	(Ukraine)	MF	2 November 1989 (aged 28)
10	Vitaliy Koltsov	(Ukraine)	MF	20 March 1994 (aged 24)
12	Dmytro Shastal	(Ukraine)	MF	30 December 1995 (aged 22)
14	Artem Polyarus	(Ukraine)	MF	5 July 1992 (aged 25)
15	Andriy Zaporozhan (Captain)	(Ukraine)	MF	21 March 1983 (aged 35)
22	Vasyl Hrytsuk	(Ukraine)	MF	21 November 1987 (aged 30)
25	Serhiy Rusyan ^{List B}	(Ukraine)	MF	5 August 1999 (aged 18)
27	Serhiy Starenkyi	(Ukraine)	MF	20 September 1984 (aged 33)
44	Yevhen Banada	(Ukraine)	MF	29 February 1992 (aged 26)
Forwards
9	Vitaliy Ponomar	(Ukraine)	FW	31 May 1990 (aged 28)
18	Artem Sitalo	(Ukraine)	FW	1 August 1989 (aged 28)
19	Vadym Hranchar ^{List B}	(Ukraine)	FW	7 March 1998 (aged 20)

== Transfers ==
=== In ===
Date	Pos.	Player	Age	Moving from	Type	Fee	Source
Summer
7 June 2017	DF	(Ukraine) Andriy Batsula	25	(Ukraine) Zirka Kropyvnytskyi	Transfer	Undisclosed	
19 June 2017	DF	(Ukraine) Andriy Tsurikov	24	(Ukraine) Dynamo Kyiv	Transfer	Free	
20 June 2017	MF	(Ukraine) Artem Schedryi	24	(Ukraine) Zirka Kropyvnytskyi	Transfer	Undisclosed	
20 June 2017	FW	(Ukraine) Artem Sitalo	27	(Ukraine) Zirka Kropyvnytskyi	Transfer	Undisclosed	
23 June 2017	GK	(Ukraine) Yuriy Pankiv	32	(Ukraine) Stal Kamianske	Transfer	Free	
23 June 2017	MF	(Ukraine) Maksym Kalenchuk	27	(Ukraine) Stal Kamianske	Transfer	Free	
17 July 2017	DF	(Azerbaijan) Pavlo Pashayev	29	(Ukraine) Stal Kamianske	Transfer	Free	
5 September 2017	MF	(Ukraine) Oleksiy Dovhyi	27	(Ukraine) Stal Kamianske	Transfer	Free	
1 June 2017	MF	(Ukraine) Bohdan Borovskyi	24	(Ukraine) Inhulets Petrove	Loan return		
Winter
2 February 2018	FW	(Ukraine) Dmytro Shastal	22	(Ukraine) Enerhiya Nova Kakhovka	Transfer	Free	
12 January 2018	DF	(Ukraine) Denys Sotnikov	18	Unattached	Transfer	Free	
12 January 2018	MF	(Ukraine) Serhiy Rusyan	18	(Ukraine) Olimpik Donetsk	Transfer	Free	
12 April 2018	DF	(Ukraine) Anton Shendrik	31	Unattached	Transfer	Free	
14 February 2018	MF	(Ukraine) Oleksiy Zinkevych	20	(Ukraine) Shakhtar Donetsk	Loan	Undisclosed	
16 February 2018	DF	(Ukraine) Hlib Bukhal	22	(Ukraine) FC Lviv	Loan		

=== Out ===
Date	Pos.	Player	Age	Moving to	Type	Fee	Source
Summer
31 May 2017	DF	(Ukraine) Yuriy Putrash	27	Unattached	Transfer	Free	
15 June 2017	MF	(Georgia (country)) Vakhtang Chanturishvili	23	(Slovakia) Spartak Trnava	Transfer	Undisclosed	
24 June 2017	GK	(Ukraine) Andriy Novak	28	(Cyprus) Ermis Aradippou	Transfer	Free	
25 June 2017	DF	(Ukraine) Serhiy Siminin	29	(Ukraine) Veres Rivne	Transfer	Free	
28 June 2017	DF	(Ukraine) Pavlo Myahkov	24	(Belarus) FC Minsk	Transfer	Free	
9 July 2017	MF	(Ukraine) Vladyslav Ohirya	27	(Kazakhstan) Irtysh Pavlodar	Transfer	Free	
13 July 2017	DF	(Ukraine) Dmytro Leonov	28	(Ukraine) Kolos Kovalivka	Transfer	Free	
17 July 2017	MF	(Ukraine) Bohdan Borovskyi	24	(Ukraine) Kremin Kremenchuk	Transfer	Undisclosed	
13 October 2017	MF	(Ukraine) Volodymyr Pryyomov	31	(Ukraine) Olimpik Donetsk	Transfer	Free	
31 May 2017	DF	(Ukraine) Andriy Tsurikov	24	(Ukraine) Dynamo Kyiv	Loan return		
Winter
1 January 2018	MF	(Ukraine) Maksym Kalenchuk	28	(Ukraine) Veres Rivne	Transfer	Free	
13 January 2018	MF	(Ukraine) Mykhaylo Kozak	26	(Ukraine) Rukh Vynnyky	Transfer	Free	
20 January 2018	FW	(Ukraine) Stanislav Kulish	28	(Ukraine) Veres Rivne	Transfer	Free	
28 January 2018	DF	(Ukraine) Serhiy Basov	30	(Kazakhstan) Akzhayik	Transfer	Free	
5 February 2018	MF	(Ukraine) Artem Chorniy	28	(Ukraine) Chornomorets Odesa	Transfer	Free	
9 February 2018	FW	(Ukraine) Yaroslav Dovhyi	19	(Ukraine) Zirka Kropyvnytskyi	Transfer	Free	
14 February 2018	MF	(Ukraine) Artem Schedryi	25	(Ukraine) Olimpik Donetsk	Transfer	Free	

== Pre-season and friendlies ==
23 June 2017 Friendly	FC Oleksandriya (Ukraine)	2–0	(Ukraine) Kremin Kremenchuk	Oleksandriya
17:00 EEST (UTC+03:00)	Sitalo 15'; Tsurikov 86'	Report		Stadium: CSC Nika Stadium

28 June 2017 Friendly	Silvolde (Netherlands)	0–7	(Ukraine) FC Oleksandriya	Netherlands
20:30 EEST (UTC+03:00)		Report	Kulish 20'; Ponomar 22'; Kalenchuk 50'; Starenkyi 55'; Banada 70'; Sitalo 74'; Bondarenko 81'

1 July 2017 Friendly	FC Oleksandriya (Ukraine)	Cancelled	(Netherlands) SC Heerenveen	Netherlands
EEST (UTC+03:00)		Report

1 July 2017 Friendly	Vitesse (Netherlands)	0–2	(Ukraine) FC Oleksandriya	Arnhem, Netherlands
18:00 EEST (UTC+03:00)		Report	Tsurikov 61'; Kulish 90'	Attendance: 700

2 July 2017 Friendly	FC Oleksandriya (Ukraine)	1–1	(Romania) Steaua București	Apeldoorn, Netherlands
19:00 EEST (UTC+03:00)	Ohirya 76'	Report	Gnohéré 44'	Stadium: WWNA Stadium

5 July 2017 Friendly	Club Brugge (Belgium)	3–0	(Ukraine) FC Oleksandriya	Garderen, Netherlands
20:00 EEST (UTC+03:00)	Bonaventure Dennis 19', 58'; Vossen 33'	Report		Stadium: De Veluwse Boys Stadium

6 July 2017 Friendly	FC Oleksandriya (Ukraine)	1–3	(Netherlands) AZ Alkmaar	Dirkshorn, Netherlands
20:00 EEST (UTC+03:00)	Polyarus 53'	Report	Helmer 38'; Weghorst 45' (pen.); Haps 78'

8 July 2017 Friendly	Panathinaikos (Greece)	0–0	(Ukraine) FC Oleksandriya	Venlo, Netherlands
19:00 EEST (UTC+03:00)		Report		Stadium: Sportclub Irene stadium

8 October 2017 Friendly	Vorskla Poltava (Ukraine)	2–3	(Ukraine) FC Oleksandriya	Poltava
15:00 EEST (UTC+03:00)	Sharpar 59'; Tkachuk 75'	Report	Sitalo 48', 62'; Kozak 50'	Stadium: Ltava Stadium

17 January 2018 Friendly	FC Oleksandriya (Ukraine)	4–0	(Bulgaria) Slavia Sofia	Turkey
15:30 EET (UTC+02:00)	Dovhyi 16'; Batsula 40'; Sitalo 72'; Tsurikov 80'	Report		Stadium: Gold City

20 January 2018 Friendly	Sepsi Sfântu Gheorghe (Romania)	1–1	(Ukraine) FC Oleksandriya	Turkey
14:00 EET (UTC+02:00)	Filipe Oliveira 29'	Report	Ilić 2'	Stadium: Kamelya Collection Fulya Hotel

22 January 2018 Friendly	Zhetysu Taldykorgan (Kazakhstan)	3–2	(Ukraine) FC Oleksandriya	Turkey
15:00 EET (UTC+02:00)	Hromțov 1', 43'; 80'	Report	Ilić 5'; Zaporozhan 60'	Stadium: Star Light hotel

25 January 2018 Friendly	FC Oleksandriya (Ukraine)	6–0	(Armenia) Pyunik Yerevan	Turkey
16:00 EET (UTC+02:00)	Zaporozhan 29'; Starenkyi 37'; Banada 47'; Stetskov 60'; Protasov 63'; Hrytsuk 75' (pen.)	Report		Stadium: Gold City

26 January 2018 Friendly	FC Oleksandriya (Ukraine)	0–1	(Bulgaria) Botev Plovdiv	Turkey
16:00 EET (UTC+02:00)		Report	Diogo Campos 35'	Stadium: Gold City

8 February 2018 Friendly	Maribor (Slovenia)	0–2	(Ukraine) FC Oleksandriya	Turkey
16:00 EET (UTC+02:00)		Report	Hrytsuk 70' (pen.); Hitchenko 90+3'

10 February 2018 Friendly	Torpedo Kutaisi (Georgia (country))	1–0	(Ukraine) FC Oleksandriya	Belek, Turkey
16:30 EET (UTC+02:00)	Dolidze 44'	Report		Stadium: Susesi hotel stadium Referee: Aleksei Eskov

11 February 2018 Friendly	Ordabasy Shymkent (Kazakhstan)	1–1	(Ukraine) FC Oleksandriya	Belek, Turkey
16:30 EET (UTC+02:00)	Nagaev 40'	Report	Protasov 26'	Stadium: Susesi hotel stadium Referee: Akobirhudja Shukulaev

25 March 2018 Friendly	Zorya Luhansk (Ukraine)	1–1	(Ukraine) FC Oleksandriya	Zaporizhia
14:00 EEST (UTC+03:00)	Hordiyenko 38'	Report	Bondarenko 90+1' (pen.)	Stadium: Torpedo Stadium

== Competitions ==
=== Overall ===
Competition	First match	Last match	Starting round	Final position	Record							
Competition	First match	Last match	Starting round	Final position	Pld	W	D	L	GF	GA	GD	Win %
Premier League	16 July 2017	19 May 2018	Matchday 1	7th	32	10	15	7	32	27	+5	31.25
Cup	25 October 2017	25 October 2017	Round of 16 (1/8)	Round of 16 (1/8)	1	0	0	1	2	3	−1	0.00
Europa League	27 July 2017	24 August 2017	3Q	Play off	4	1	2	1	3	3	+0	25.00
Total					37	11	17	9	37	33	+4	29.73

Last updated: 19 May 2018
Source: Competitions

=== Premier League ===
==== League table ====
Pos	Team	Pld	W	D	L	GF	GA	GD	Pts	Qualification or relegation
7	FC Oleksandriya	32	10	15	7	32	27	+5	45	
8	Karpaty Lviv	32	8	13	11	28	45	−17	37	
9	Olimpik Donetsk	32	9	9	14	29	38	−9	36	
10	Zirka Kropyvnytskyi (R)	32	7	10	15	22	40	−18	31	Qualification for the Relegation play-offs
11	Chornomorets Odesa (Z)	32	6	11	15	26	49	−23	29	Qualification for the Relegation play-offs

Source: Ukrainian Premier League (in Ukrainian), UEFA, Soccerway
Rules for classification: 1) Points; 2) Goal difference; 3) Goals scored; 4) Head-to-head points; 5) Head-to-head goal difference; 6) Head-to-head goals scored; 7) Draw.
(R) Relegated; (Z) Readmitted in after withdrawal of FC Poltava. see 2017–18 Ukrainian Premier League #Relegation play-offs for more information.

Team 1	Agg.	Team 2	1st leg	2nd leg
Zirka Kropyvnytskyi	1–5	Desna Chernihiv	1–1	0–4
Chornomorets Odesa	1–3	FC Poltava	1–0	0–3 (a.e.t.)

==== Results summary ====
Overall								Home						Away					
Pld	W	D	L	GF	GA	GD	Pts	W	D	L	GF	GA	GD	W	D	L	GF	GA	GD
32	10	15	7	32	27	+5	45	6	7	3	17	9	+8	4	8	4	15	18	−3

Last updated: 19 May 2018.
Source: Competitive matches

==== Results by round ====
Round	1	2	3	4	5	6	7	8	9	10	11	12	13	14	15	16	17	18	19	20	21	22	23	24	25	26	27	28	29	30	31	32
Ground	H	A	H	A	H	A	H	A	H	A	H	A	H	A	H	A	H	A	H	A	H	A	H	H	A	H	A	A	A	H	A	H
Result	L	D	D	D	L	D	L	L	W	D	D	L	D	D	D	W	W	L	D	L	W	D	D	D	D	W	D	W	W	W	W	W
Position	11	11	10	9	10	11	11	11	9	8	8	9	9	10	10	8	8	8	8	8	8	8	8	8	8	8	8	7	7	7	7	7

Updated to match(es) played on 19 May 2018. Source: Competitive matches
A = Away; H = Home; W = Win; D = Draw; L = Loss

==== Matches ====
16 July 2017 1	FC Oleksandriya	0–2	Olimpik Donetsk	Oleksandriya
19:30 EEST (UTC+03:00)	Hitchenko (yellow card) 43'; Kalenchuk (yellow card) 49'; Sitalo (yellow card) 56'; Tsurikov (yellow card) 71'; Chebotayev (yellow card) 76'; Batsula (yellow card) 85'	Report	Khomutov 16'; Nyemchaninov 36', (yellow card) 75'; Bilenkyi (yellow card) 49'; Moha (yellow card) 90+3'	Stadium: CSC Nika Stadium; Attendance: 2,400; Referee: Yevhen Aranovsky

22 July 2017 2	Veres Rivne	0–0	FC Oleksandriya	Lviv
17:00 EEST (UTC+03:00)	Yevhen Pasich (yellow card) 71'	Report	Chebotayev (yellow card) 60'	Stadium: Arena Lviv; Attendance: 1,715; Referee: Mykola Balakin

30 July 2017 3	FC Oleksandriya	1–1	Zorya Luhansk	Oleksandriya
19:30 EEST (UTC+03:00)	Kulish 6'; Hitchenko (yellow card) 48'; Chebotayev (yellow card) 69'	Report	Pryima (yellow card) 45'; Hrechyshkin 49' (pen.); Iury (yellow card) 57'	Stadium: CSC Nika Stadium; Attendance: 1,400; Referee: Kostyantyn Trukhanov

6 August 2017 4	Chornomorets Odesa	2–2	FC Oleksandriya	Odesa
19:30 EEST (UTC+03:00)	Tretyakov 26', (yellow card) 62' (yellow-red card) 70'; Khoblenko 48'; Kaverin (yellow card) 67'; Rakhmanaw (yellow card) 74'; Bobko (yellow card) 90+1'	Report	Kozak (yellow card) 19'; Pashayev (yellow card) 26'; Basov (yellow card) 31'; Chorniy (yellow card) 33' (yellow-red card) 45'; Hitchenko (yellow card) 45'; Tsurikov (yellow card) 57'; Bondarenko (yellow card) 75'; Hrytsuk 80' (pen.); Sitalo 87'	Stadium: Chornomorets Stadium; Attendance: 5,154; Referee: Vitaliy Romanov

12 August 2017 5	FC Oleksandriya	1–2	Shakhtar Donetsk	Oleksandriya
19:30 EEST (UTC+03:00)	Banada 38'; Zaporozhan (yellow card) 60'; Batsula (yellow card) 63'	Report	Stepanenko (yellow card) 29'; Fred 41', (yellow card) 59'; Kryvtsov (yellow card) 45+2'; Srna (yellow card) 54'; Marlos (yellow card) 57'; Kovalenko (yellow card) 59'; Ferreyra 60'	Stadium: CSC Nika Stadium; Attendance: 3,816; Referee: Yevhen Aranovsky

20 August 2017 6	Karpaty Lviv	0–0	FC Oleksandriya	Lviv
17:00 EEST (UTC+03:00)	Lobay (yellow card) 60'; Pidkivka (yellow card) 60'; Holodyuk (yellow card) 60'; Chachua (yellow card) 60'; Lebedenko (yellow card) 60'	Report	Banada (yellow card) 60'	Stadium: Ukraina Stadium; Attendance: 4,220; Referee: Dmytro Kutakov

27 August 2017 7	FC Oleksandriya	0–1	Vorskla Poltava	Oleksandriya
19:30 EEST (UTC+03:00)	Kalenchuk (yellow card) 76'	Report	Rebenok 28'; Dallku (yellow card) 72'; Sharpar (yellow card) 74'; Tkachenko (yellow card) 90+3'	Stadium: CSC Nika Stadium; Attendance: 1,200; Referee: Mykola Kryvonosov

10 September 2017 8	Dynamo Kyiv	3–0	FC Oleksandriya	Kyiv
19:30 EEST (UTC+03:00)	González (yellow card) 42'; Khacheridi 54'; Mbokani 54'; Tsyhankov 54'; Sydorchuk (yellow card) 55'	Report	Banada (yellow card) 42'	Stadium: NSC Olimpiyskiy; Attendance: 8,439; Referee: Oleksandr Derdo

16 September 2017 9	FC Oleksandriya	4–1	Stal Kamianske	Oleksandriya
14:00 EEST (UTC+03:00)	Mykhaylychenko 14' (o.g.); Starenkyi 31', 38', 51', (yellow card) 78'	Report	Mykhaylychenko (yellow card) 9'; Obradović 18'; Klymchuk (yellow card) 84'; Knysh (yellow card) 86'	Stadium: CSC Nika Stadium; Attendance: 1,150; Referee: Serhiy Berezka

24 September 2017 10	FC Mariupol	1–1	FC Oleksandriya	Mariupol
17:00 EEST (UTC+03:00)	Bolbat (yellow card) 56'; Tankovskyi (yellow card) 62'; Kisil (yellow card) 79'; Yavorskyi 86'	Report	Hrytsuk 28'; Polyarus (yellow card) 30'; Zaporozhan (yellow card) 34'; Levanidov (yellow card) 61'	Stadium: Illichivets Stadium; Attendance: 8,810; Referee: Yuriy Hrysyo

30 September 2017 11	Oleksandriya	0–0	Zirka Kropyvnytskyi	Oleksandriya
17:00 EEST (UTC+03:00)		Report	Kacharaba (yellow card) 18'; Guedj (yellow card) 67'; Tsyupa (yellow card) 72'	Stadium: CSC Nika Stadium; Attendance: 1,810; Referee: Dmytro Bondarenko

14 October 2017 12	Olimpik Donetsk	1–0	FC Oleksandriya	Kyiv
17:00 EEST (UTC+03:00)	Shestakov (yellow card) 73'; Brikner 88'	Report	Sitalo (yellow card) 7'; Pashayev (yellow card) 83'	Stadium: Dynamo Stadium; Attendance: 325; Referee: Serhiy Berezka

21 October 2017 13	FC Oleksandriya	1–1	Veres Rivne	Oleksandriya
17:00 EEST (UTC+03:00)	Sitalo (yellow card) 15'; Polyarus (yellow card) 31' (yellow-red card) 86'; Starenkyi (yellow card) 60', (goal) 77'; Zaporozhan (yellow card) 79'; Tsurikov (yellow card) 83'	Report	Morozenko (yellow card) 52', (goal) 63'; Serhiychuk (yellow card) 84'; Kobin (yellow card) 90+4'	Stadium: CSC Nika Stadium; Attendance: 1,100; Referee: Kateryna Monzul

29 October 2017 14	Zorya Luhansk	2–2	FC Oleksandriya	Zaporizhia
17:00 EET (UTC+02:00)	Iury 11', (yellow card) 44'; Hromov 34'; Kharatin (yellow card) 45+1'	Report	Ponomar (yellow card) 17' (yellow-red card) 80'; Chebotayev (yellow card) 40'; Starenkyi 54'; Zaporozhan (yellow card) 65'; Bondarenko 70'; Batsula (yellow card) 72'	Stadium: Slavutych-Arena; Attendance: 1,200; Referee: Dmytro Kutakov

4 November 2017 15	FC Oleksandriya	0–0	Chornomorets Odesa	Oleksandriya
17:00 EET (UTC+02:00)	Banada (yellow card) 33'; Chorniy (yellow card) 84'	Report	Politylo (yellow card) 11'; Tatarkov (yellow card) 15'; Lyulka (yellow card) 52'; N'Diaye (yellow card) 90+1'	Stadium: CSC Nika Stadium; Attendance: 1,608; Referee: Yuriy Hrysyo

17 November 2017 16	Shakhtar Donetsk	1–2	FC Oleksandriya	Kharkiv
19:00 EET (UTC+02:00)	Bernard 18'; Fred (yellow card) 65'	Report	Polyarus 15', 27', (yellow card) 65'; Dovhyi (yellow card) 53'; Pankiv (yellow card) 79'	Stadium: Metalist OSC; Attendance: 4,037; Referee: Oleksandr Balakin

26 November 2017 17	FC Oleksandriya	3–0	Karpaty Lviv	Oleksandriya
17:00 EET (UTC+02:00)	Polyarus 60', (yellow card) 62'; Starenkyi 66'; Dovhyi (yellow card) 76'; Ponomar 79'	Report	Tissone (yellow card) 29'; Khudobyak (yellow card) 75'	Stadium: CSC Nika Stadium; Attendance: 1,007; Referee: Serhiy Boyko

3 December 2017 18	Vorskla Poltava	3–1	FC Oleksandriya	Poltava
17:00 EET (UTC+02:00)	Kulach 20'; Kolomoyets 42'; Kobakhidze 49'; Chesnakov (yellow card) 74'; Giorgadze (yellow card) 78'	Report	Zaporozhan (yellow card) 52'; Polyarus (yellow card) 88'; Hitchenko 90+2'	Stadium: Vorskla Stadium; Attendance: 400; Referee: Ivan Bondar

10 December 2017 19	FC Oleksandriya	0–0	Dynamo Kyiv	Oleksandriya
14:00 EET (UTC+02:00)	Banada (yellow card) 15'; Hitchenko (yellow card) 67'; Pashayev (yellow card) 83'	Report	Pantić (yellow card) 47'; Besyedin (yellow card) 67' (yellow-red card) 78'; Buyalskyi (yellow card) 67'; Shepelyev (yellow card) 83'	Stadium: CSC Nika Stadium; Attendance: 2,228; Referee: Yuriy Mozharovsky

17 February 2018 20	Stal Kamianske	2–0	FC Oleksandriya	Kyiv
14:00 EET (UTC+03:00)	Zaderaka (yellow card) 16'; Meskhi (yellow card) 55'; Kopytov 71'; Klymchuk 76'	Report	Bukhal 17'; Babohlo (yellow card) 60'; Batsula (yellow card) 84'	Stadium: Obolon Arena; Attendance: 512; Referee: Ievgenii Aranovskyi

24 February 2018 21	FC Oleksandriya	1–0	FC Mariupol	Oleksandriya
14:00 EET (UTC+02:00)	Bukhal (yellow card) 14', (goal) 88'; Tsurikov (yellow card) 41'	Report	Dedechko (yellow card) 45'; Churko (yellow card) 50'; Totovytskyi (yellow card) 90+2'	Stadium: CSC Nika Stadium; Attendance: 613; Referee: Ihor Paskhal

6 March 2018 22	Zirka Kropyvnytskyi	0–0	FC Oleksandriya	Kropyvnytskyi
14:00 EET (UTC+02:00)	Drachenko (yellow card) 44'; Bilonoh (yellow card) 66'	Report	Hrytsuk (yellow card) 9'; Bukhal (yellow card) 82'; Banada (yellow card) 90+3'	Stadium: Zirka Stadium; Attendance: 1,141; Referee: Maksym Kozyryatskyi

10 March 2018 23	FC Oleksandriya	0–0	Chornomorets Odesa	Oleksandriya
17:00 EET (UTC+02:00)	Banada (yellow card) 5'; Hitchenko (yellow card) 45+1'; Sitalo (red card) 74'	Report	Wagué (yellow card) 36'; Sílvio (yellow card) 41'; Tretyakov (yellow card) 90+4'	Stadium: CSC Nika Stadium; Attendance: 700; Referee: Serhiy Boyko

18 March 2018 24	FC Oleksandriya	1–1	Karpaty Lviv	Oleksandriya
14:00 EET (UTC+02:00)	Ponomar 71'; Hitchenko (yellow card) 90+4'	Report	Nesterov (yellow card) 39'; Erbes (yellow card) 42'; Lobay (yellow card) 66'; Shved 77'	Stadium: CSC Nika Stadium; Attendance: 330; Referee: Volodymyr Novokhatniyi

31 March 2018 25	Zirka Kropyvnytskyi	0–0	FC Oleksandriya	Kropyvnytskyi
14:00 EEST (UTC+03:00)	Zahalskyi (yellow card) 5'; Averyanov (yellow card) 57'	Report	Dovhyi (yellow card) 63'	Stadium: Zirka Stadium; Attendance: 1,585; Referee: Denys Shurman

7 April 2018 26	FC Oleksandriya	2–0	Stal Kamianske	Oleksandriya
17:00 EEST (UTC+03:00)	Protasov 14'; Dovhyi (yellow card) 28'; Hrytsuk 36' (pen.); Bondarenko (yellow card) 80'	Report	Danielyan (yellow card) 36'; Ebert (yellow card) 51'	Stadium: CSC Nika Stadium; Attendance: 1,188; Referee: Maksym Kozyryatskyi

15 April 2018 27	Olimpik Donetsk	0–0	FC Oleksandriya	Kyiv
14:00 EEST (UTC+03:00)	Kulynych (yellow card) 84'	Report	Stetskov (yellow card) 77'	Stadium: Dynamo Stadium; Attendance: 575; Referee: Volodymyr Novokhatniy

21 April 2018 28	Chornomorets Odesa	1–3	FC Oleksandriya	Odesa
14:00 EEST (UTC+03:00)	Hladkyy (yellow card) 48'; Bobko 50'	Report	Starenkyi 7'; Hrytsuk 24' (pen.), (yellow card) 64'; Dovhyi (yellow card) 59'; Polyarus 77'; Zaporozhan (yellow card) 90+3'	Stadium: Chornomorets Stadium; Attendance: 5,321; Referee: Mykola Balakin

28 April 2018 29	Karpaty Lviv	1–2	FC Oleksandriya	Lviv
14:00 EEST (UTC+03:00)	Nesterov 5'; Lobay (yellow card) 40'; Hutsulyak (yellow card) 81'; Carrascal (yellow card) 89'	Report	Banada 32'; Sitalo 52', (yellow card) 59'; Dovhyi (yellow card) 58'	Stadium: Ukraina Stadium; Attendance: 6,725; Referee: Yaroslav Kozyk

6 May 2018 30	FC Oleksandriya	1–0	Zirka Kropyvnytskyi	Oleksandriya
19:30 EEST (UTC+03:00)	Zaporozhan 37'; Dovhyi (yellow card) 45'	Report	Bilonoh (yellow card) 42'; Khodakovskyi (yellow card) 85'; Petrov (yellow card) 90'	Stadium: CSC Nika Stadium; Attendance: 1,850; Referee: Kateryna Monzul

12 May 2018 31	Stal Kamianske	1–2	FC Oleksandriya	Kyiv
17:00 EEST (UTC+03:00)	Gor Malakyan (yellow card) 67'; Khotsyanovskyi (yellow card) 71'; Mysyk 90+1' (pen.)	Report	Banada (yellow card) 26'; Batsula 76'; Tsurikov 78'; Shendrik (yellow card) 85'; Chebotayev (yellow card) 89'	Stadium: Obolon Arena; Attendance: 450; Referee: Anatoliy Abdula

19 May 2018 32	FC Oleksandriya	2–0	Olimpik Donetsk	Oleksandriya
17:00 EEST (UTC+03:00)	Pashayev (yellow card) 18'; Protasov (yellow card) 26'; Shendrik (yellow card) 35'; Hrytsuk 55' (pen.); Stetskov 80'	Report	Kychak (yellow card) 54'; Pasich (yellow card) 58'; Apostoliuk (yellow card) 65'; Schastlyvtsev (yellow card) 75'	Stadium: CSC Nika Stadium; Attendance: 1,300; Referee: Mykola Balakin

=== Ukrainian Cup ===
25 October 2017. Round of 16 (1/8)	FC Oleksandriya	2–3	Dynamo Kyiv	Oleksandriya
19:30 EEST (UTC+03:00)	Basov (yellow card) 31'; Starenkyi 77'; Polyarus (yellow card) 118'; Hrytsuk 120+5' (pen.)	Report	Kravets 36', 116', (yellow card) 62'; Harmash (yellow card) 90+2'; Besyedin 107'; Khacheridi (yellow card) 120+4'	Stadium: CSC Nika Stadium; Referee: Yuriy Mozharovsky

=== Europa League ===
27 July 2017 3rd qualifying	Astra Giurgiu (Romania)	0–0	(Ukraine) FC Oleksandriya	Giurgiu, Romania
20:30 EEST (UTC+3)	Chipirliu (yellow card) 50'; Dandea (yellow card) 57'; Polczak (yellow card) 79'	Report	Basov (yellow card) 39' (yellow-red card) 78'; Batsula (yellow card) 49'	Stadium: Stadionul Marin Anastasovici; Attendance: 1,482; Referee: Dimitar Meckarovski

3 August 2017 3rd qualifying	FC Oleksandriya (Ukraine)	1–0 (1–0 agg.)	(Romania) Astra Giurgiu	Oleksandriya
20:00 EEST (UTC+3)	Sitalo (yellow card) 19'; Zaporozhan 43' (pen.); Batsula (yellow card) 50'	Report	Polczak (yellow card) 41'; Stan (yellow card) 43'; Ioniță (yellow card) 45+2'	Stadium: CSC Nika Stadium; Referee: Oliver Drachta

17 August 2017 Play-off	BATE Borisov (Belarus)	1–1	(Ukraine) FC Oleksandriya	Barysaw, Belarus
20:00 EEST (UTC+3)	Ivanić 8'; Stasevich (yellow card) 66'; Milunović (yellow card) 72'	Report	Basov (yellow card) 3'; Banada 19'; Hrytsuk (yellow card) 65'	Stadium: Borisov Arena; Referee: Tamás Bognár

24 August 2017 Play off	FC Oleksandriya (Ukraine)	1–2 (2–3 agg.)	(Belarus) BATE Borisov	Oleksandriya
20:00 EEST (UTC+3)	Hrytsuk 34' (pen.)	Report	Ivanić 70', 73'	Stadium: CSC Nika Stadium; Referee: Miroslav Zelinka

== Statistics ==
=== Appearances and goals ===
No.	Pos	Nat	Player	Total		Premier League		Cup		Europa League	
No.	Pos	Nat	Player	Apps	Goals	Apps	Goals	Apps	Goals	Apps	Goals
Goalkeepers
21	GK	(Ukraine) UKR	Dmytro Rudyk	1	0	1	0	0	0	0	0
24	GK	(Ukraine) UKR	Vladyslav Levanidov	6	0	6	0	0	0	0	0
79	GK	(Ukraine) UKR	Yuriy Pankiv	30	0	25	0	1	0	4	0
Defenders
2	DF	(Ukraine) UKR	Serhiy Chebotayev	17	0	11+1	0	1	0	4	0
4	DF	(Ukraine) UKR	Vladyslav Babohlo	4	0	3+1	0	0	0	0	0
5	DF	(Ukraine) UKR	Valeriy Bondarenko	25	1	22	1	0	0	2+1	0
11	DF	(Ukraine) UKR	Andriy Tsurikov	28	1	19+4	1	1	0	3+1	0
13	DF	(Ukraine) UKR	Hlib Bukhal	7	1	7	1	0	0	0	0
17	DF	(Ukraine) UKR	Andriy Hitchenko	30	1	25	1	1	0	4	0
20	DF	(Azerbaijan) AZE	Pavlo Pashayev	25	0	24+1	0	0	0	0	0
26	DF	(Ukraine) UKR	Anton Shendrik	4	0	2+2	0	0	0	0	0
29	DF	(Ukraine) UKR	Andriy Batsula	31	1	25+1	1	0+1	0	4	0
98	DF	(Ukraine) UKR	Tymur Stetskov	4	1	1+3	1	0	0	0	0
Midfielders
7	MF	(Ukraine) UKR	Yevhen Protasov	13	1	8+5	1	0	0	0	0
8	MF	(Ukraine) UKR	Oleksiy Dovhyi	13	0	13	0	0	0	0	0
10	MF	(Ukraine) UKR	Vitaliy Koltsov	2	0	1+1	0	0	0	0	0
12	MF	(Ukraine) UKR	Dmytro Shastal	5	0	0+5	0	0	0	0	0
14	MF	(Ukraine) UKR	Artem Polyarus	28	4	20+5	4	1	0	2	0
15	MF	(Ukraine) UKR	Andriy Zaporozhan	25	2	19+2	1	1	0	3	1
22	MF	(Ukraine) UKR	Vasyl Hrytsuk	34	7	26+3	5	0+1	1	4	1
25	MF	(Ukraine) UKR	Serhiy Rusyan	1	0	0+1	0	0	0	0	0
27	MF	(Ukraine) UKR	Serhiy Starenkyi	30	8	15+10	7	1	1	3+1	0
44	MF	(Ukraine) UKR	Yevhen Banada	33	3	24+4	2	1	0	4	1
Forwards
9	FW	(Ukraine) UKR	Vitaliy Ponomar	35	2	17+13	2	0+1	0	0+4	0
18	FW	(Ukraine) UKR	Artem Sitalo	31	2	20+6	2	1	0	4	0
19	FW	(Ukraine) UKR	Vadym Hranchar	1	0	0+1	0	0	0	0	0
Players transferred out during the season
6	MF	(Ukraine) UKR	Maksym Kalenchuk	17	0	5+8	0	1	0	1+2	0
7	FW	(Ukraine) UKR	Stanislav Kulish	13	1	5+6	1	0	0	0+2	0
13	MF	(Ukraine) UKR	Artem Chorniy	5	0	2+2	0	0	0	0+1	0
72	MF	(Ukraine) UKR	Mykhaylo Kozak	8	0	3+5	0	0	0	0	0
87	DF	(Ukraine) UKR	Serhiy Basov	8	0	3+2	0	1	0	2	0

Source: Competitions

Last updated: 19 May 2018

=== Goalscorers ===
Rank	No.	Pos	Nat	Name	Premier League	Cup	Europa League	Total
1	27	MF	(Ukraine)	Serhiy Starenkyi	7	1	0	8
2	22	MF	(Ukraine)	Vasyl Hrytsuk	5	1	1	7
3	14	MF	(Ukraine)	Artem Polyarus	4	0	0	4
4	44	MF	(Ukraine)	Yevhen Banada	2	0	1	3
5	9	FW	(Ukraine)	Vitaliy Ponomar	2	0	0	2
5	15	MF	(Ukraine)	Andriy Zaporozhan	1	0	1	2
5	18	FW	(Ukraine)	Artem Sitalo	2	0	0	2
8	7	FW	(Ukraine)	Stanislav Kulish	1	0	0	1
8	7	MF	(Ukraine)	Yevhen Protasov	1	0	0	1
8	5	DF	(Ukraine)	Valeriy Bondarenko	1	0	0	1
8	11	DF	(Ukraine)	Andriy Tsurikov	1	0	0	1
8	13	DF	(Ukraine)	Hlib Bukhal	1	0	0	1
8	17	DF	(Ukraine)	Andriy Hitchenko	1	0	0	1
8	29	DF	(Ukraine)	Andriy Batsula	1	0	0	1
8	98	DF	(Ukraine)	Tymur Stetskov	1	0	0	1
				Own goal	1	0	0	1
				Total	32	2	3	37

Last updated: 19 May 2018

=== Clean sheets ===
Rank	No.	Pos	Nat	Name	Premier League	Cup	Europa League	Total
1	79	GK	(Ukraine)	Yuriy Pankiv	11	0	2	13
2	24	GK	(Ukraine)	Vladyslav Levanidov	2	0	0	2
3	21	GK	(Ukraine)	Dmytro Rudyk	1	0	0	1
				Total	14	0	2	16

Last updated: 6 May 2018

=== Disciplinary record ===
No.	Pos	Nat	Player	Premier League			Cup			Europa League			Total		
No.	Pos	Nat	Player	Booked	(yellow card) (yellow-red card)	Sent off (straight red)	Booked	(yellow card) (yellow-red card)	Sent off (straight red)	Booked	(yellow card) (yellow-red card)	Sent off (straight red)	Booked	(yellow card) (yellow-red card)	Sent off (straight red)
2	DF	(Ukraine)	Serhiy Chebotayev	5	0	0	0	0	0	0	0	0	5	0	0
4	DF	(Ukraine)	Vladyslav Babohlo	1	0	0	0	0	0	0	0	0	1	0	0
5	DF	(Ukraine)	Valeriy Bondarenko	2	0	0	0	0	0	0	0	0	2	0	0
6	MF	(Ukraine)	Maksym Kalenchuk	2	0	0	0	0	0	0	0	0	2	0	0
7	MF	(Ukraine)	Yevhen Protasov	1	0	0	0	0	0	0	0	0	1	0	0
8	MF	(Ukraine)	Oleksiy Dovhyi	6	0	0	0	0	0	0	0	0	6	0	0
9	FW	(Ukraine)	Vitaliy Ponomar	0	1	0	0	0	0	0	0	0	0	1	0
11	DF	(Ukraine)	Andriy Tsurikov	4	0	0	0	0	0	0	0	0	4	0	0
13	MF	(Ukraine)	Hlib Bukhal	3	0	0	0	0	0	0	0	0	3	0	0
13	MF	(Ukraine)	Artem Chorniy	1	1	0	0	0	0	0	0	0	1	1	0
14	MF	(Ukraine)	Artem Polyarus	4	1	0	1	0	0	0	0	0	5	1	0
15	MF	(Ukraine)	Andriy Zaporozhan	6	0	0	0	0	0	0	0	0	6	0	0
17	DF	(Ukraine)	Andriy Hitchenko	5	0	0	0	0	0	0	0	0	5	0	0
18	FW	(Ukraine)	Artem Sitalo	3	0	1	0	0	0	1	0	0	4	0	1
20	DF	(Azerbaijan)	Pavlo Pashayev	4	0	0	0	0	0	0	0	0	4	0	0
22	MF	(Ukraine)	Vasyl Hrytsuk	2	0	0	0	0	0	1	0	0	3	0	0
24	GK	(Ukraine)	Vladyslav Levanidov	1	0	0	0	0	0	0	0	0	1	0	0
26	DF	(Ukraine)	Anton Shendrik	2	0	0	0	0	0	0	0	0	2	0	0
27	MF	(Ukraine)	Serhiy Starenkyi	2	0	0	0	0	0	0	0	0	2	0	0
29	DF	(Ukraine)	Andriy Batsula	4	0	0	0	0	0	2	0	0	6	0	0
44	MF	(Ukraine)	Yevhen Banada	8	0	0	0	0	0	0	0	0	8	0	0
72	MF	(Ukraine)	Mykhaylo Kozak	1	0	0	0	0	0	0	0	0	1	0	0
79	GK	(Ukraine)	Yuriy Pankiv	2	0	0	0	0	0	0	0	0	2	0	0
87	DF	(Ukraine)	Serhiy Basov	1	0	0	1	0	0	1	1	0	3	1	0
98	DF	(Ukraine)	Tymur Stetskov	1	0	0	0	0	0	0	0	0	1	0	0
			Total	71	3	1	2	0	0	5	1	0	78	4	1

Last updated: 19 May 2018
