= Valeriy Bondarenko =

Ukrainian footballer

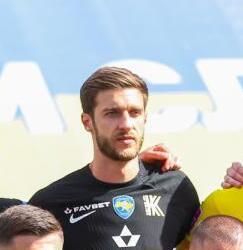

Personal information
- Full name: Valeriy Serhiyovych Bondarenko
- Date of birth: 3 February 1994 (age 32)
- Place of birth: Kyiv, Ukraine
- Height: 1.94 m (6 ft 4 in)
- Position: Defender

Team information
- Current team: FC Livyi Bereh Kyiv
- Number: 5

Youth career
- 2007–2008: Obolon Kyiv
- 2008–2011: Arsenal Kyiv

Senior career*
Years	Team	Apps	(Gls)
2011–2014	Arsenal Kyiv	0	(0)
2014–2015	Torpedo Kutaisi	12	(1)
2015–2017	Skala Stryi	53	(4)
2017–2019	Oleksandriya	48	(2)
2019–2024	Shakhtar Donetsk	1	(0)
2019–2020	→ Vitória Guimarães (loan)	8	(0)
2020–2021	→ Oleksandriya (loan)	18	(3)
2021	→ Vorskla Poltava (loan)	4	(0)
2022–2023	→ Oleksandriya (loan)	15	(0)
2023–2024	→ Kolos Kovalivka (loan)	26	(1)
2024–26	Kolos Kovalivka	68	(1)
2026-	FC Livyi Bereh Kyiv	4	(0)
- * Club domestic league appearances and goals as of 27/9/26 @ 04:53(AEST)

Valeriy Serhiyovych Bondarenko (Ukrainian: Валерій Сергійович Бондаренко; born 3 February 1994) is a Ukrainian professional footballer who plays as a defender for Kolos Kovalivka.

== Career ==
Bondarenko is a product of the Obolon Kyiv and Arsenal Kyiv Youth Sportive School Systems. He spent time as player in the Ukrainian Premier League Reserves, but in August 2014 signed a contract with FC Torpedo Kutaisi in the Umaglesi Liga.

== Honours ==
=== Club ===
Shakhtar Donetsk

- Ukrainian Premier League

Winner (1): 2018–19

- Ukrainian Cup

Winner (1): 2018–19

== Career statistics ==
=== Club ===
As of 4 June 2019

Club	Season	League			Cup		Champions League		Europa League		Super Cup		Total	
Club	Season	Division	Apps	Goals	Apps	Goals	Apps	Goals	Apps	Goals	Apps	Goals	Apps	Goals
Torpedo Kutaisi	2014–15	Umaglesi Liga	12	1	2	0	0	0	0	0	0	0	14	1
Total			12	1	2	0	0	0	0	0	0	0	14	1
Skala Stryi	2014–15	Ukrainian Second League	10	0	0	0	0	0	0	0	0	0	10	0
Skala Stryi	2015–16	Ukrainian Second League	24	2	1	0	0	0	0	0	0	0	25	2
Skala Stryi	2016–17	Ukrainian First League	19	2	0	0	0	0	0	0	0	0	19	2
Total			53	4	1	0	0	0	0	0	0	0	54	4
Oleksandriya	2016–17	Ukrainian Premier League	7	0	0	0	0	0	0	0	0	0	7	0
Oleksandriya	2017–18	Ukrainian Premier League	23	1	0	0	0	0	3	0	0	0	26	1
Oleksandriya	2018–19	Ukrainian Premier League	18	1	0	0	0	0	0	0	0	0	18	1
Total			48	2	0	0	0	0	3	0	0	0	51	2
Shakhtar Donetsk	2018–19	Ukrainian Premier League	1	0	0	0	0	0	0	0	0	0	1	0
Total			1	0	0	0	0	0	0	0	0	0	1	0
Career total			114	7	3	0	0	0	3	0	0	0	120	7
