= Tymur Stetskov =

Ukrainian footballer

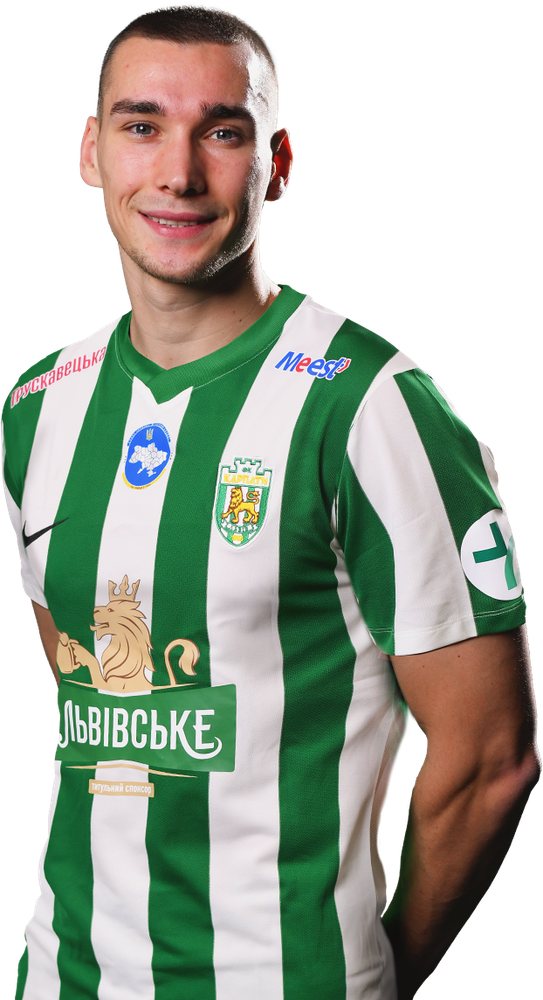

Personal information
- Full name: Tymur Vadymovych Stetskov
- Date of birth: 27 January 1998 (age 28)
- Place of birth: Kryvyi Rih, Ukraine
- Height: 1.84 m (6 ft 0 in)
- Position: Defender

Team information
- Current team: Karpaty Lviv
- Number: 55

Youth career
- 2011–2015: Dnipro Dnipropetrovsk

Senior career*
Years	Team	Apps	(Gls)
2015	Hirnyk Kryvyi Rih	2	(0)
2015	Kryvbas Kryvyi Rih	1	(0)
2016–2022	Oleksandriya	45	(2)
2022–2025	Kryvbas Kryvyi Rih	61	(4)
2025–	Karpaty Lviv	9	(0)

International career^{‡}
2019–2020	Ukraine U21	7	(0)
- * Club domestic league appearances and goals as of 1 June 2026 ‡ National team caps and goals as of 19 September 2023

Tymur Vadymovych Stetskov (Ukrainian: Тимур Вадимович Стецьков; born 27 January 1998) is a Ukrainian professional footballer who plays as a defender for Karpaty Lviv in the Ukrainian Premier League.

== Career ==
Stetskov is a product of the FC Dnipro youth sportive school system. His first trainer was Oleksiy Chystyakov.

He played at the Ukrainian amateurs level for some time, when he signed a contract with the Ukrainian Premier League club Oleksandriya.

== Career statistics ==
As of 22 October 2021

Appearances and goals by club, season and competition
Club	Season	League			Cup		Continental		Other		Total	
Club	Season	Division	Apps	Goals	Apps	Goals	Apps	Goals	Apps	Goals	Apps	Goals
Hirnyk Kryvyi Rih	2015	Kryvyi Rih City Championship	2	0	0	0	—		0	0	2	0
Hirnyk Kryvyi Rih	Total		2	0	0	0	—		0	0	2	0
Kryvbas Kryvyi Rih	2015	Dnipropetrovsk Oblast Championship	1	0	0	0	—		0	0	1	0
Kryvbas Kryvyi Rih	Total		1	0	0	0	—		0	0	1	0
Oleksandriya	2017–18	Ukrainian Premier League	4	1	0	0	0	0	—		4	1
Oleksandriya	2018–19	Ukrainian Premier League	7	0	0	0	—		—		7	0
Oleksandriya	2019–20	Ukrainian Premier League	13	0	2	0	1 (Note: Appearance(s) in UEFA Europa League)	0	—		16	0
Oleksandriya	2020–21	Ukrainian Premier League	18	1	4	0	—		—		22	1
Oleksandriya	2021–22	Ukrainian Premier League	3	0	1	0	—		—		4	0
Oleksandriya	Total		45	2	7	0	1	0	—		53	2
Career total			48	2	7	0	1	0	0	0	56	2
