= Türkay =

Türkay (pronounced [ˈtyɾkaj]) is a Turkish name and surname. Notable people with the surname include:

- İnci Türkay (born 1972), Turkish actress
- Osman Türkay (1927–2001), Turkish Cypriot poet
- Tuvana Türkay (born 1990), Turkish actress
