= Vasyl Hrytsuk =

Ukrainian footballer

Personal information
- Full name: Vasyl Vasylyovych Hrytsuk
- Date of birth: 21 November 1987 (age 38)
- Place of birth: Kryvyi Rih, Ukrainian SSR
- Height: 1.80 m (5 ft 11 in)
- Position: Midfielder

Team information
- Current team: Polissya Zhytomyr
- Number: 22

Youth career
- 2000–2004: Kryvbas Kryvyi Rih

Senior career*
Years	Team	Apps	(Gls)
2004–2009	Kryvbas Kryvyi Rih	10	(0)
2009	→ Naftovyk-Ukrnafta Okhtyrka (loan)	9	(1)
2010–2011	Oleksandriya	41	(5)
2011–2012	Naftovyk-Ukrnafta Okhtyrka	32	(8)
2012–2020	Oleksandriya	186	(35)
2021–	Polissya Zhytomyr	70	(14)
- * Club domestic league appearances and goals as of 15 June 2024

Vasyl Hrytsuk (Ukrainian: Василь Васильович Грицук; born 21 November 1987) is a Ukrainian professional footballer who plays as a midfielder for Polissya Zhytomyr.

He is the product of the Kryvbas Kryvyi Rih Youth school system and played for the club's senior side until 2008.
