= Vladyslav Levanidov =

Ukrainian footballer (born 1993)

Personal information
- Full name: Vladyslav Oleksandrovych Levanidov
- Date of birth: 23 February 1993 (age 33)
- Place of birth: Kryvyi Rih, Dnipropetrovsk Oblast, Ukraine
- Height: 1.83 m (6 ft 0 in)
- Position: Goalkeeper

Team information
- Current team: Poprad Muszyna
- Number: 1

Youth career
- 2006–2009: RVUFK Kyiv
- 2009–2011: Dynamo Kyiv
- 2011–2012: Oleksandriya

Senior career*
Years	Team	Apps	(Gls)
2009	CSKA Kyiv	3	(0)
2009–2011	Dynamo Kyiv	0	(0)
2011–2019	Oleksandriya	62	(0)
2019–2021	Volyn Lutsk	29	(0)
2021–2022	Dinaz Vyshhorod	11	(0)
2022–2023	Khust	7	(0)
2024–	Poprad Muszyna	46	(0)

International career
2009	Ukraine U17	0	(0)
- * Club domestic league appearances and goals as of 08:53, 19 June 2025 (UTC)

Vladyslav Levanidov (Ukrainian: Владислав Олександрович Леванідов; born 23 February 1993) is a Ukrainian professional footballer who plays as a goalkeeper for Polish club Poprad Muszyna.

He is the product of the RVUFK Kyiv sportive school. In the summer of 2011 he signed a contract with PFC Oleksandria. In 2009, he was called up for the Ukraine national under-17 football team, but did not play any games for this youth representation.
