= Yevhen Protasov =

Ukrainian footballer

Personal information
- Full name: Yevhen Yevhenovych Protasov
- Date of birth: 23 July 1997 (age 29)
- Place of birth: Melitopol, Ukraine
- Height: 1.68 m (5 ft 6 in)
- Position: Midfielder

Team information
- Current team: Vitebsk
- Number: 10

Youth career
- 2011–2012: Melitopol

Senior career*
Years	Team	Apps	(Gls)
2015	Melitopolska Chereshnya	3	(0)
2015–2016	Zorya Luhansk	0	(0)
2016–2020	Oleksandriya	38	(1)
2020–2021	Volyn Lutsk	30	(2)
2021	Metalist 1925 Kharkiv	15	(0)
2022–2023	Sūduva	47	(3)
2023–2024	Telavi	8	(1)
2024	Neftchi Kochkor-Ata	3	(0)
2024	Stilon Gorzów Wielkopolski	14	(2)
2025	Naftan Novopolotsk	28	(4)
2026–	Vitebsk	13	(1)

International career
2018	Ukraine U21	1	(0)
- * Club domestic league appearances and goals as of 3 July 2026

Yevhen Yevhenovych Protasov (Ukrainian: Євген Євгенович Протасов; born 23 July 1997) is a Ukrainian professional footballer who plays as a midfielder for Belarusian Premier League club Vitebsk.

== Club career ==
Protasov made his Ukrainian Premier League debut for Oleksandriya in a game against Stal Kamianske on 17 February 2018.

On 17 January 2022, he signed with Lithuanian side Sūduva Club.

== Honours ==
Sūduva

- Lithuanian Supercup: 2022
