= Serhii Chebotaiev =

Ukrainian footballer

Serhiyi Chebotaiev
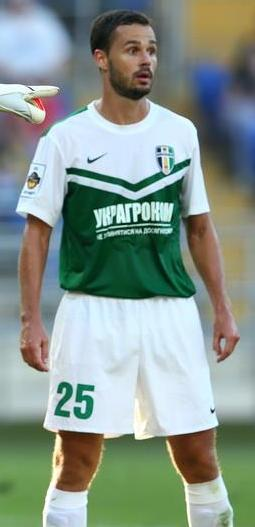
- Chebotaiev with Oleksandriia in 2015

Personal information
- Full name: Serhii Yevhenovych Chebotaiev
- Date of birth: 7 March 1988 (age 38)
- Place of birth: Zaporizhzhia, Ukrainian SSR
- Height: 1.77 m (5 ft 9 1/2 in)
- Position: Defender

Youth career
- 2000–2001: FC Dynamo Zaporizhzhia
- 2001–2002: Metalurh Zaporizhzhia
- 2002–2005: FC Dynamo Zaporizhzhia
- 2005: Shakhtar Donetsk

Senior career*
Years	Team	Apps	(Gls)
2007	Volyn Lutsk	8	(0)
2008	Stal Alchevsk	1	(0)
2008	FC Nikopol	3	(0)
2009–2012	Stal Alchevsk	104	(2)
2013	Helios Kharkiv	6	(0)
2013–2014	Poltava	24	(0)
2014–2015	Hirnyk-Sport Komsomolsk	26	(0)
2015–2018	Oleksandriya	45	(0)
2018–2019	Dnipro-1	25	(0)
2019	Veres Rivne	19	(0)
2020	Slutsk	15	(0)
2020	Kremin Kremenchuk	15	(0)
2021	Tavriya Simferopol	25	(0)
2022	Motor Zaporizhzhia	5	(0)

Managerial career
- 2024–: Livyi Bereh Kyiv (youth coach)
- * Club domestic league appearances and goals

Serhii Chebotaiev (Ukrainian: Сергій Євгенович Чеботаєв; born 7 March 1988) is a Ukrainian former professional football defender.

== Playing career ==
Chebotaiev began playing for Volyn Lutsk. He later played for Stal Alchevsk, Nikopol, Stal Alchevsk, Helios Kharkiv, Poltava and Hirnyk-Sport Komsomolsk. During the 2016–17 season, Chebotaiev was the first choice right full-back Oleksandriia until his injury in spring. During his time with Oleksandriia, he played in forty-five matches. During 2018–19 he played for Dnipro-1 and helped them earn promotion to Premier League. Next season he spent with Veres Rivne where he started in all his nineteen matches. In February 2020 Chebotaiev joined Slutsk in Belarus. He left Slutsk after making fifteen appearances. Chebotaiev joined Kremin Kremenchuk before the start of the 2020–21 season. He made his debut on 5 September against his former club Volyn Lutsk. During early part of December 2020, Chebotaiev left Kremin after playing in fifteen matches. In December 2021 signed for Tavriya Simferopol. His last club was Motor Zaporizhzhia.
