= Andriy Batsula =

Ukrainian footballer

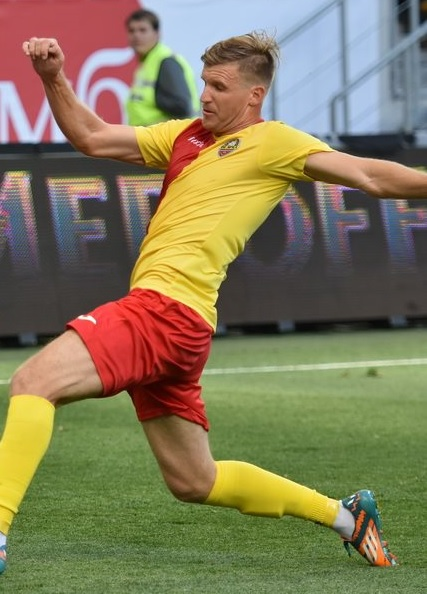

Personal information
- Full name: Andriy Serhiyovych Batsula
- Date of birth: 6 February 1992 (age 34)
- Place of birth: Kremenchuk, Ukraine
- Height: 1.84 m (6 ft 1/2 in)
- Position: Left-back

Team information
- Current team: Vorskla Poltava
- Number: 29

Youth career
- 2005–2007: Kremin Kremenchuk
- 2007: BRV-VIK Volodymyr-Volynskyi
- 2007–2009: Kremin Kremenchuk

Senior career*
| Years | Team | Apps | (Gls) |
| 2009–2014 | Vorskla Poltava | 0 | (0) |
| 2012–2013 | → Kremin Kremenchuk (loan) | 25 | (7) |
| 2013–2014 | → Kremin Kremenchuk (loan) | 16 | (1) |
| 2014–2017 | Zirka Kropyvnytskyi | 83 | (8) |
| 2017–2018 | Oleksandriya | 27 | (1) |
| 2018–2020 | Kortrijk | 24 | (0) |
| 2020 | → Dinamo Minsk (loan) | 13 | (0) |
| 2021 | Dinamo Minsk | 27 | (2) |
| 2022– | Vorskla Poltava | 69 | (1) |

International career
| 2008 | Ukraine U16 | 4 | (1) |
| 2009 | Ukraine U17 | 2 | (0) |
- * Club domestic league appearances and goals as of 14 June 2025

Andriy Batsula (Ukrainian: Андрій Сергійович Бацула; born 6 February 1992) is a Ukrainian professional footballer who plays as a left-back for Vorskla Poltava.

== Career ==
Batsula is the product of the Youth Sportive School FC Kremin Kremenchuk, but in July 2009 he signed a contract with FC Vorskla Poltava.

Batsula's professional career continued, when he was promoted on loan again to FC Kremin Kremenchuk and in January 2014 he went on loan to the Ukrainian First League club FC Tytan Armyansk.
