= Vitaliy Ponomar =

Ukrainian footballer

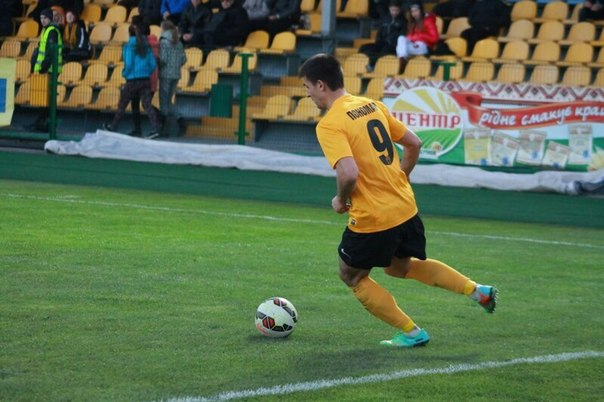

Personal information
- Full name: Vitaliy Vadymovych Ponomar
- Date of birth: 31 May 1990 (age 36)
- Place of birth: Kupiansk, Ukrainian SSR
- Height: 1.82 m (5 ft 11 1/2 in)
- Position: Forward

Youth career
- 2002–2007: Mriya Kupiansk
- 2007: Youth Sportive School Cherkasy

Senior career*
Years	Team	Apps	(Gls)
2007–2010	Shakhtar Donetsk	0	(0)
2007	→ Komunalnyk Luhansk (loan)	12	(0)
2008–2009	→ Shakhtar-3 Donetsk	40	(19)
2009	→ Oleksandriya (loan)	9	(0)
2009	→ FC Oleksandriya-2 (amateur)	3	(1)
2010	Poltava	7	(1)
2010–2013	Shakhtar Sverdlovsk	79	(14)
2013–2014	UkrAhroKom Holovkivka	28	(8)
2014–2019	Oleksandriya	135	(25)
2019	Volyn Lutsk	15	(3)
2020	Torpedo Kutaisi	8	(2)
2021–2022	Metalist 1925 Kharkiv	12	(6)
2023	Dinaz Vyshhorod	1	(0)
- * Club domestic league appearances and goals as of 31 December 2023

Vitaliy Ponomar (Ukrainian: Віталій Вадимович Пономар; born 31 May 1990) is a Ukrainian footballer playing as a forward.

He is a product of the Kupiansk sports school system, and later played for clubs from East and Central Ukraine.
