= Andriy Tsurikov =

Ukrainian footballer

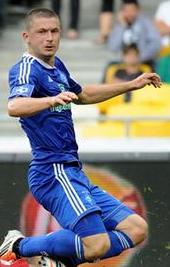

Personal information
- Full name: Andriy Volodymyrovych Tsurikov
- Date of birth: 5 October 1992 (age 34)
- Place of birth: Zaporizhzhia, Ukraine
- Height: 1.85 m (6 ft 1 in)
- Position: Left back

Team information
- Current team: Kolos Kovalivka
- Number: 9

Youth career
- 2005–2009: Metalurh Zaporizhzhia

Senior career*
Years	Team	Apps	(Gls)
2009–2012	Metalurh Zaporizhzhia	52	(4)
2009	→ Metalurh-2 Zaporizhzhia	6	(1)
2013–2017	Dynamo Kyiv	6	(0)
2015	→ Metalurh Zaporizhzhia (loan)	7	(1)
2015–2016	→ Hoverla Uzhhorod (loan)	15	(1)
2016	→ Levadiakos (loan)	9	(0)
2016–2017	→ Oleksandriya (loan)	23	(0)
2017–2019	Oleksandriya	48	(4)
2019	Jablonec	0	(0)
2020–2021	Dnipro-1	26	(2)
2021–2022	Metalist Kharkiv	0	(0)
2021–2022	→ Oleksandriya (loan)	18	(0)
2022–2023	Oleksandriya	22	(5)
2023–	Kolos Kovalivka	77	(11)

International career^{‡}
2008	Ukraine U16	4	(0)
2008	Ukraine U17	1	(0)
2010	Ukraine U18	4	(0)
2010	Ukraine U19	3	(0)
2012–2014	Ukraine U21	17	(1)
- * Club domestic league appearances and goals as of 3 June 2026 ‡ National team caps and goals as of 14 June 2014

Andriy Volodymyrovych Tsurikov (Ukrainian: Андрій Володимирович Цуріков; born 5 October 1992) is a Ukrainian professional footballer who plays as a defender for Kolos Kovalivka.

== Career ==
Tsurikov is product of youth team system FC Metalurh Zaporizhzhia. His first coach was Volodymyr Shapovalov Made his debut for FC Metalurh entering as a full-time playing against FC Karpaty Lviv on 25 July 2010 in Ukrainian Premier League.

== Honours ==
- Ukrainian Cup: 2013–14
