= Dmytro Shastal =

Ukrainian footballer

Personal information
- Full name: Dmytro Volodymyrovych Shastal
- Date of birth: 30 December 1995 (age 30)
- Place of birth: Kyiv, Ukraine
- Height: 1.78 m (5 ft 10 in)
- Position: Forward

Team information
- Current team: Livyi Bereh Kyiv
- Number: 7

Youth career
- 2008–2010: Zmina-Obolon Kyiv
- 2010–2012: Zirka Kyiv
- 2013: RVUFK Kyiv

Senior career*
Years	Team	Apps	(Gls)
2014	Kolos Kovalivka	4	(1)
2015	Poltava	21	(1)
2016–2017	Enerhiya Nova Kakhovka	47	(28)
2018–2021	Oleksandriya	63	(9)
2021–2025	Polissya Zhytomyr	45	(10)
2024	→ Veres Rivne (loan)	14	(1)
2024	→ Polissya-2 Zhytomyr	5	(4)
2025–	Livyi Bereh Kyiv	42	(10)
- * Club domestic league appearances and goals as of 3 June 2026

Dmytro Volodymyrovych Shastal (Ukrainian: Дмитро Володимирович Шастал; born 30 December 1995) is a Ukrainian professional footballer who plays as a forward for Livyi Bereh Kyiv.

== Career ==
Shastal is a product of several sports schools in Kyiv including Sports School Zmina Kyiv and Piddubny Olympic College. In 2014 Shastal started to play for the Kolos Kovalivka in the national amateur competitions. He made his professional debut for Poltava in the away match against Dynamo-2 Kyiv on 21 March 2015 in the Ukrainian First League in a 0-2 loss.
