= CSC Nika Stadium =

Football stadium in Oleksandria, Ukraine

Cultural Sports Complex Nika Stadium
- Nika Stadium
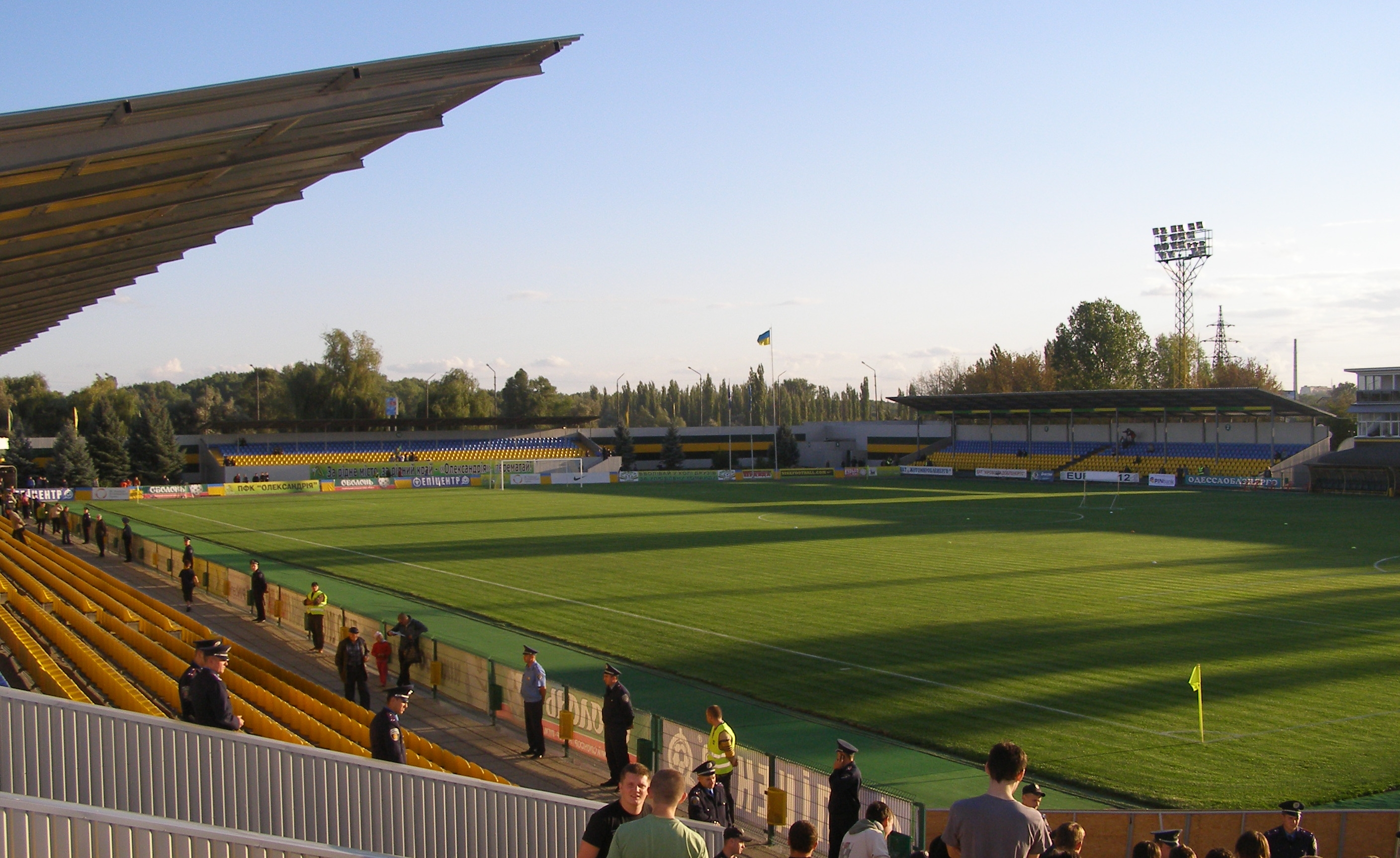
- Interactive map of Cultural Sports Complex Nika Stadium
- Former names: Shakhtar Stadium
- Location: Oleksandria, Ukraine
- Coordinates: 48°40′29″N 33°06′13″E
- Capacity: 7,000
- Surface: Grass
- Field size: 105 m × 68 m (344 ft × 223 ft)

Construction
- Renovated: 30 May 1998 (completely rebuilt)

Tenants
- Shakhtar Oleksandria (?-1992); MFK Oleksandria (2004-2006); UkrAhroKom Holovkivka (2013-2014); PFC Oleksandria (1991-1992, 1998-present)

Cultural Sports Complex Nika Stadium is a football stadium in the city of Oleksandria, Ukraine. The stadium was rebuilt in 1998 in place of Shakhtar Stadium under a new name Nika.

The stadium is the home ground of Ukrainian Premier League club PFC Oleksandria and has a capacity of 7,000 spectators.

Before 1992 as Shakhtar Stadium, it was a home ground of another football club Shakhtar Oleksandriya. FC Oleksandriya that in 1991-2003 was known as FC Polihraftekhnika played about four games in the 1992 Ukrainian First League before it was forced to move to its newly built Olimp Stadium (25 May 1991). After Shakhtar Oleksandriya became defunct in the 1990s, the stadium was rebuilt into the Cultural Sports Complex "Nika" and reopened in 1998. In 1998, Polihraftekhnika returned to the stadium.

Between 2004–2006, MFK Oleksandria played their home games also at the stadium.

Seventy percent of the seating is under cover. The main stadium has administration offices as well as a conference hall.
