= Vadym Hranchar =

Ukrainian footballer

Personal information
- Full name: Vadym Dmytrovych Hranchar
- Date of birth: 7 March 1998 (age 28)
- Place of birth: Piskivka, Ukraine
- Height: 1.83 m (6 ft 0 in)
- Position: Attacking midfielder

Team information
- Current team: Real Pharma Odesa
- Number: 25

Youth career
- 2011–2015: Chornomorets Odesa

Senior career*
Years	Team	Apps	(Gls)
2014–2016	Chornomorets Odesa	0	(0)
2016–2019	Oleksandriya	2	(0)
2019	Balkany Zorya	14	(1)
2021–	Real Pharma Odesa	77	(4)

International career^{‡}
2015	Ukraine U17	7	(2)
- * Club domestic league appearances and goals as of 31 December 2024 ‡ National team caps and goals as of 11 February 2022

Vadym Dmytrovych Hranchar (Ukrainian: Вадим Дмитрович Гранчар; born 7 March 1998) is a Ukrainian professional footballer who plays as an attacking midfielder for Ukrainian club Real Pharma Odesa.
