= Artem Sitalo =

Ukrainian footballer

Personal information
- Full name: Artem Serhiyovych Sitalo
- Date of birth: 1 August 1989 (age 37)
- Place of birth: Kherson, Ukrainian SSR
- Height: 1.89 m (6 ft 2 in)
- Position: Midfielder

Team information
- Current team: Metalurh Zaporizhzhia
- Number: 14

Youth career
- 2002–2006: Osvita Kherson

Senior career*
Years	Team	Apps	(Gls)
2009–2014	Krystal Kherson	91	(26)
2010	→ Kolos Khlibodarivka (loan)	7	(6)
2014–2016	Hirnyk Kryvyi Rih	44	(15)
2016–2017	Zirka Kropyvnytskyi	30	(3)
2017–2021	Oleksandriya	98	(14)
2021–2025	Inhulets Petrove	60	(17)
2025–2026	Podillya Khmelnytskyi	10	(1)
2026–	Metalurh Zaporizhzhia	13	(4)
- * Club domestic league appearances and goals as of 8 October 2026

Artem Serhiyovych Sitalo (Ukrainian: Артем Сергійович Сітало; born 1 August 1989) is a Ukrainian professional footballer who plays as a midfielder for Ukrainian First League club Metalurh Zaporizhzhia.

Sitalo is a product of the FC Osvita Kherson youth system. In 2009, he joined FC Krystal Kherson before the club's return to professional football. In Krystal, Sitalo was a captain and a leading attacking player. In 2014 he moved to FC Hirnyk Kryvyi Rih.
