= Kyrylo Prokopchuk =

Ukrainian footballer

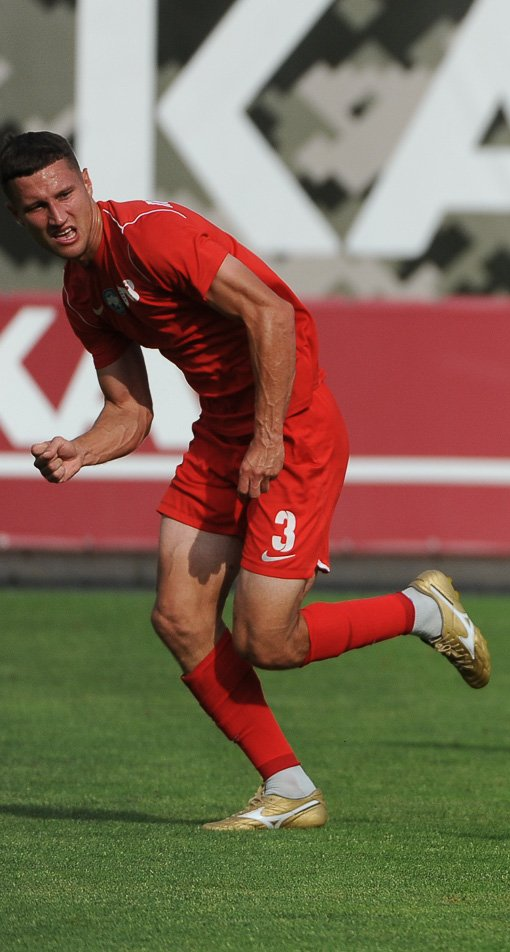

Personal information
- Full name: Kyrylo Oleksandrovych Prokopchuk
- Date of birth: 14 February 1998 (age 28)
- Place of birth: Dnipropetrovsk, Ukraine
- Height: 1.87 m (6 ft 2 in)
- Position: Centre-back

Team information
- Current team: FC Obolon Kyiv

Youth career
- 2008–2009: DYuSK Olimpik Dnipro
- 2009–2010: DYuSSh-12 Dnipropetrovsk
- 2011–2015: Dnipro Dnipropetrovsk

Senior career*
Years	Team	Apps	(Gls)
2015–2020	Oleksandriya	1	(0)
2020–2021	Polissya Zhytomyr	28	(0)
2021–2022	Kramatorsk	16	(1)
2022–2023	Bukovyna Chernivtsi	19	(1)
2023	Nyva Buzova	17	(2)
2024	Mynai	22	(0)
2025–2026	Bukovyna Chernivtsi	9	(0)
2025	→ Bukovyna-2 Chernivtsi	4	(0)
2026 -	FC Obolon Kyiv	7	(0)
- * Club domestic league appearances and goals as of 6 October 2026 @ 14:22(AEST)

Kyrylo Oleksandrovych Prokopchuk (Ukrainian: Кирило Олександрович Прокопчук; born 14 February 1998) is a Ukrainian professional footballer who plays as a centre-back.

== Career ==
In March 2023 he signed for Bukovyna Chernivtsi. On 14 April 2023 he scored against Chernihiv in Ukrainian First League.
