= Pavel Pashayev =

Azerbaijani footballer (born 1988)

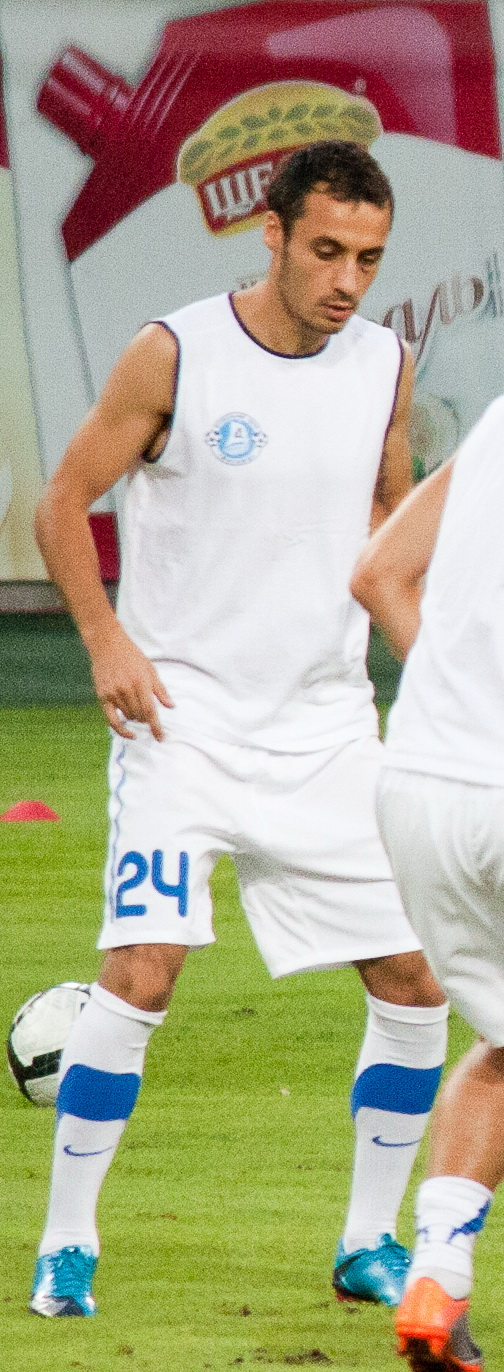

Personal information
- Full name: Pavel Vaqif oglu Pashayev
- Date of birth: 4 January 1988 (age 38)
- Place of birth: Krasnyi Luch, Soviet Union (now Ukraine)
- Height: 1.75 m (5 ft 9 in)
- Position: Right-back

Youth career
- 2001–2004: Kremin Kremenchuk
- 2004–2008: Dnipro Dnipropetrovsk

Senior career*
| Years | Team | Apps | (Gls) |
| 2008–2014 | Dnipro Dnipropetrovsk | 24 | (0) |
| 2008 | → Kryvbas Kryvyi Rih (loan) | 10 | (0) |
| 2012–2013 | → Kryvbas Kryvyi Rih (loan) | 24 | (0) |
| 2013–2014 | → Karpaty Lviv (loan) | 23 | (0) |
| 2014–2015 | Metalurh Zaporizhzhia | 29 | (0) |
| 2016 | Gabala | 1 | (0) |
| 2016–2017 | Stal Kamianske | 29 | (0) |
| 2017–2021 | Oleksandriya | 88 | (0) |
| 2021 | VPK-Ahro Shevchenkivka | 11 | (0) |

International career^{‡}
| 2003 | Ukraine U15 | 5 | (0) |
| 2003–2004 | Ukraine U16 | 17 | (0) |
| 2004–2005 | Ukraine U17 | 17 | (1) |
| 2005 | Ukraine U18 | 4 | (0) |
| 2006 | Ukraine U19 | 5 | (0) |
| 2006–2011 | Ukraine U21 | 18 | (0) |
| 2009 | Ukraine | 2 | (0) |
| 2015–2020 | Azerbaijan | 21 | (0) |
- * Club domestic league appearances and goals as of 12 February 2022 ‡ National team caps and goals as of 20 November 2019

Pavel Vaqif oglu Pashayev (Azerbaijani: Pavel Vaqif oğlu Paşayev, Ukrainian: Павло Вагіфович Пашаєв; born 4 January 1988) is a professional footballer who plays as a right-back. Born in Ukraine, he originally represented Ukraine internationally before switching to represent the Azerbaijan national team.

== Career ==
Pashayev was the product of the Dnipro Dnipropetrovsk Youth school system. He was loaned from Dnipro Dnipropetrovsk to Kryvbas at the end of the 2008–09 summer transfer window until the end of 2008. He was recalled to Dnipro in January 2009. On 25 July 2014 Pashayev signed with Metalurh Zaporizhya. On 18 February 2016 Pashayev signed with Gabala FK. On 17 July 2017 Pashayev signed with FC Oleksandriya.

== International career ==
On 2 February 2009, Pavel Pashayev was called up to the Ukraine team for the first time in his career, for friendlies against Slovakia and Serbia. He debuted on 10 February against Slovakia.

Since he only played for Ukraine in friendlies, he was still eligible to join the Azerbaijan national football team. He made his first appearance for Azerbaijan in a 2–1 friendly win over Moldova on 17 November 2015.

== Personal life ==
His twin brother, Maksym Pashayev played as a defender for Dnipro Dnipropetrovsk, but died after a car accident in December 2008.

== Club statistics ==
As of match played 1 May 2016

| Club performance | | | League | | Cup | | Continental | | Total | |
| Season | Club | League | Apps | Goals | Apps | Goals | Apps | Goals | Apps | Goals |
| Ukraine | | | League | | Ukrainian Cup | | Europe | | Total | |
|---|---|---|---|---|---|---|---|---|---|---|
| 2008–09 | Kryvbas Kryvyi Rih | Premier League | 10 | 0 | 1 | 0 | - | | 11 | 0 |
| 2009–10 | Dnipro Dnipropetrovsk | Premier League | 22 | 0 | 1 | 0 | - | | 23 | 0 |
| 2010–11 | Dnipro Dnipropetrovsk | Premier League | 2 | 0 | 0 | 0 | 2 | 0 | 4 | 0 |
| 2011–12 | Dnipro Dnipropetrovsk | Premier League | 0 | 0 | 0 | 0 | - | | 0 | 0 |
| 2012–13 | Kryvbas Kryvyi Rih | Premier League | 24 | 0 | 1 | 0 | - | | 25 | 0 |
| 2013–14 | Karpaty Lviv | Premier League | 23 | 0 | 1 | 0 | - | | 24 | 0 |
| 2014–15 | Metalurh Zaporizhya | Premier League | 22 | 0 | 3 | 0 | - | | 25 | 0 |
| 2015–16 | Metalurh Zaporizhya | Premier League | 7 | 0 | 1 | 0 | - | | 8 | 0 |
| 2015–16 | Gabala | Azerbaijan Premier League | 1 | 0 | 1 | 0 | - | | 2 | 0 |
| Career Total | | | 109 | 0 | 9 | 0 | 2 | 0 | 120 | 0 |

=== International ===
Azerbaijan national team
| Year | Apps | Goals |
|---|---|---|
| 2015 | 1 | 0 |
| 2016 | 2 | 0 |
| 2017 | 4 | 0 |
| 2018 | 10 | 0 |
| 2019 | 4 | 0 |
| Total | 21 | 0 |

Statistics accurate as of match played 16 November 2019
