= Serhiy Starenkyi =

Ukrainian footballer

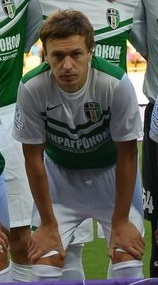

Personal information
- Full name: Serhiy Mykolayovych Starenkyi
- Date of birth: 20 September 1984 (age 42)
- Place of birth: Novi Petrivtsi, Ukrainian SSR
- Height: 1.77 m (5 ft 10 in)
- Position: Midfielder

Youth career
- 1994–2002: Chaika Vyshhorod
- 2002–2005: Dinaz Vyshhorod

Senior career*
Years	Team	Apps	(Gls)
2005–2006	Torpedo Zhodino	25	(2)
2007	Smorgon	17	(0)
2008–2010	Desna Chernihiv	73	(10)
2010	Lviv	20	(5)
2011–2012	Oleksandriya	57	(6)
2013	Arsenal Kyiv	7	(0)
2013–2018	Oleksandriya	111	(28)
2018–2020	Desna Chernihiv	34	(4)
2021–2025	Dinaz Vyshhorod	83	(7)

Managerial career
- 2022–: Dinaz Vyshhorod (director)
- * Club domestic league appearances and goals as of 24 June 2025

Serhiy Mykolayovych Starenkyi (Ukrainian: Сергій Миколайович Старенький; born 20 September 1984) is a Ukrainian professional footballer who plays as a midfielder.

== Career ==
Starenkyi is a product of the youth systems of Chaika Vyshhorod and Dinaz Vyshhorod.

=== Desna Chernihiv ===
On 23 June 2018 he signed with Desna Chernihiv. In his third season with the club, he helped them qualify for the Europa League third qualifying round for the first time.

=== Dinaz Vyshhorod ===
On 16 January 2021, Starenkyi signed for Dinaz Vyshhorod in the Ukrainian Second League. On 19 March, he made his league debut for the club against Chaika. On 22 May, he scored his first goal for the club against Karpaty Lviv.

In January 2022, while still under contract as a player, he became the director of the club. In June 2025, he retired as professional football.

== Outside of professional football ==
On 15 June 2025, on the occasion of the 65th anniversary of the foundation of Desna Chernihiv, he accepted to be part in the match of Desna Chernihiv stars against the football stars of the Chernihiv's region at the Chernihiv Arena, with the specific goal of raising 1,000,000 hryvnias to support the public organization EVUM, which has been working with children with cancer for over 12 years.

== Honours ==
Oleksandriya

- Ukrainian First League: 2014–15
