= Yuriy Pankiv =

Ukrainian footballer (born 1984)

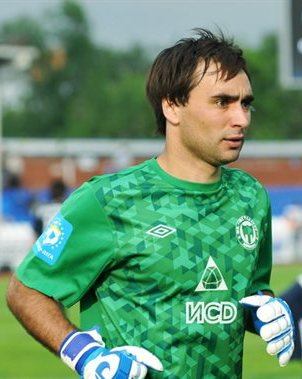

Personal information
- Full name: Yuriy Mykhaylovych Pankiv
- Date of birth: 3 November 1984 (age 42)
- Place of birth: Lviv, Ukrainian SSR, Soviet Union
- Height: 1.86 m (6 ft 1 in)
- Position: Goalkeeper

Youth career
- 1998–1999: Karpaty Lviv
- 1999: UFK Lviv
- 1999–2001: Karpaty Lviv
- 2001: Volyn Lutsk

Senior career*
Years	Team	Apps	(Gls)
2001–2006	Karpaty Lviv	0	(0)
2001–2005	→ Karpaty-2 Lviv	28	(0)
2001–2004	→ Halychyna-Karpaty Lviv	40	(0)
2005	→ Enerhetyk Burshtyn (loan)	8	(0)
2006	→ Hazovyk-Skala Stryi (loan)	4	(0)
2006	→ Lviv (loan)	11	(0)
2007	Desna Chernihiv	1	(0)
2007–2008	Nyva Ternopil	34	(0)
2009–2012	Oleksandriya	74	(0)
2012–2013	Arsenal Kyiv	11	(0)
2013–2015	Metalurh Donetsk	37	(0)
2015–2017	Stal Kamianske	49	(0)
2017–2021	Oleksandriya	101	(0)
2021–2024	Rukh Lviv	41	(0)

International career
2001	Ukraine U16	1	(0)
- * Club domestic league appearances and goals

Yuriy Mykhaylovych Pankiv (Ukrainian: Юрій Михайлович Паньків; born 3 November 1984) is a Ukrainian former professional footballer who played as a goalkeeper.

== Career ==
=== Clubs career ===
Born in Lviv, Pankiv is the product of FC Karpaty Lviv sportive school in his native city, but not made debut for the main team. During some years he played for different Ukrainian clubs, but never in the Ukrainian Premier League. In 2009, he signed a contract with PFC Oleksandria in the Ukrainian First League, and in 2011 made debut in Premier League together with his team against FC Vorskla Poltava on 8 July.

On 9 August 2012, Pankiv made his UEFA Europa League debut as a member of FC Arsenal Kyiv, at Ljudski vrt in Maribor, against Slovenian side Mura 05. He kept a clean sheet as Arsenal won 2–0.

In November 2018, Molod Ukrayiny named Pankiv as Ukrainian Goalkeeper of the Year in their annual football awards edition.

=== National representation ===
On 27 May 2019, at the age of 34, Pankiv was called up to the Ukraine national team for the first time in his career, due to Denys Boyko's injury.
