= Anton Shendrik =

Ukrainian footballer

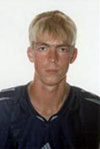

Personal information
- Full name: Anton Serhiyovych Shendrik
- Date of birth: 26 May 1986 (age 40)
- Place of birth: Simferopol, Krym Oblast, Ukrainian SSR
- Height: 1.91 m (6 ft 3 in)
- Position: Defender

Team information
- Current team: Krymteplytsia Molodizhne

Youth career
- 2000–2004: Tavriya Simferopol

Senior career*
Years	Team	Apps	(Gls)
2004–2005	Tavriya Simferopol	0	(0)
2005–2006	Yalos Yalta	18	(1)
2006	Khimik Krasnoperekopsk	10	(0)
2007	Stal Dniprodzerzhynsk	4	(0)
2008	Volyn Lutsk	0	(0)
2008	Chornomornaftohaz Simferopol (amateur)	2	(0)
2008	Ihroservice Simferopol	17	(0)
2009–2011	Zakarpattia Uzhhorod	44	(1)
2011–2012	Obolon Kyiv	12	(0)
2012–2017	Oleksandriya	102	(2)
2018–2020	Oleksandriya	38	(2)
2020–	Krymteplytsia Molodizhne	0	(0)
- * Club domestic league appearances and goals as of 31 July 2020

Anton Shendrik (Ukrainian: Антон Сергійович Шендрік; born 26 May 1986) is a Ukrainian football defender. He plays for Krymteplytsia Molodizhne in the Crimean Premier League.

== Career ==
Shendrik is a product of his native city SC Tavriya Simferopol youth sportive school system.

He played in different Ukrainian amateur, Second League and First League clubs. In June 2012 Shendrik signed a contract with FC Oleksandriya. In summer 2015 he was promoted to the Ukrainian Premier League together with his club FC Oleksandriya.
