= Vladyslav Shkinder =

Ukrainian footballer

Personal information
- Full name: Vladyslav Petrovych Shkinder
- Date of birth: 29 December 1998 (age 27)
- Place of birth: Rivne, Ukraine
- Height: 1.84 m (6 ft 0 in)
- Position: Centre-back

Team information
- Current team: Podillya Khmelnytskyi
- Number: 19

Youth career
- 2011: Veres Rivne
- 2011–2015: VIK-Volyn Volodymyr-Volynskyi

Senior career*
Years	Team	Apps	(Gls)
2015–2019	Oleksandriya	0	(0)
2019–2022	Uzhhorod	47	(1)
2022–2023	Vast Mykolaiv	17	(2)
2023–2024	Druzhba Myrivka	22	(0)
2024–	Podillya Khmelnytskyi	42	(1)

International career^{‡}
2014–2015	Ukraine U17	14	(0)
2015–2016	Ukraine U18	6	(0)
2015–2016	Ukraine U19	14	(0)
- * Club domestic league appearances and goals as of 4 June 2026 ‡ National team caps and goals as of 19 November 2021

Vladyslav Petrovych Shkinder (Ukrainian: Владислав Петрович Шкіндер; born 29 December 1998) is a Ukrainian professional footballer who plays as a centre-back for Ukrainian club Podillya Khmelnytskyi.
