= Hlib Bukhal =

Ukrainian footballer

Personal information
- Full name: Hlib Hennadiyovych Bukhal
- Date of birth: 12 November 1995 (age 31)
- Place of birth: Kyiv, Ukraine
- Height: 1.90 m (6 ft 3 in)
- Position: Centre-back

Team information
- Current team: Ulytau
- Number: 25

Youth career
- 2008–2010: Zmina-Obolon Kyiv
- 2010: Zirka Kyiv
- 2011–2012: Arsenal Kyiv

Senior career*
Years	Team	Apps	(Gls)
2012–2013	Arsenal Kyiv	0	(0)
2014	Metalist Kharkiv	0	(0)
2015	Arsenal Kyiv	10	(1)
2016	Metalist Kharkiv	0	(0)
2017	Chaika Kyiv-Sviatoshyn Raion	9	(2)
2017–2018	Lviv	15	(2)
2018	→ Oleksandriya (loan)	7	(1)
2018–2021	Oleksandriya	30	(0)
2022	Kryvbas Kryvyi Rih	0	(0)
2022	→ Sigma Olomouc B (loan)	10	(1)
2022	Hebar Pazardzhik	14	(1)
2023	Chojniczanka Chojnice	14	(0)
2023–2025	Resovia	48	(1)
2025–2026	Van	10	(0)
2026–	Ulytau	26	(1)

International career
2017	Ukraine (students)		
- * Club domestic league appearances and goals as of 1 November 2026

Hlib Hennadiyovych Bukhal (Ukrainian: Гліб Геннадійович Бухал; born 12 November 1995) is a Ukrainian professional footballer who plays as a centre-back for Kazakhstan Premier League club Ulytau.

== Career ==
Bukhal is a product of the different Kyivan Youth Sportive Schools.

He spent his early career playing in the Ukrainian Premier League Reserves for Arsenal Kyiv and Metalist Kharkiv, before appearing for Arsenal and Lviv in the Ukrainian Second League.

He was the member of the Ukraine student football team at the 2017 Summer Universiade in Taipei. In January 2022, he moved to Kryvbas Kryvyi Rih in Ukrainian First League.

In July 2022, Bukhal joined Bulgarian team Hebar Pazardzhik.

On 16 January 2023, Bukhal joined Polish I liga side Chojniczanka Chojnice on a half-a-year contract, with an option for another year.

On 1 July 2023, Resovia announced the signing of Bukhal on a two-year deal.

On 3 September 2025, Bukhal signed for Armenian Premier League side Van.
