= Dmytro Rudyk =

Ukrainian footballer

Personal information
- Full name: Dmytro Petrovych Rudyk
- Date of birth: 26 August 1992 (age 34)
- Place of birth: Oleksandriya, Ukraine
- Height: 1.90 m (6 ft 3 in)
- Position: Goalkeeper

Youth career
- 2005–2009: FC Ametyst Oleksandria

Senior career*
Years	Team	Apps	(Gls)
2009–2010	FC Ametyst Oleksandria	23	(0)
2009	→PFC Oleksandria-2	2	(0)
2011–2020	FC Oleksandriya	4	(0)
- * Club domestic league appearances and goals as of 14 January 2021

Dmytro Rudyk (Ukrainian: Дмитро Петрович Рудик; born 26 August 1992), is a professional Ukrainian football goalkeeper who played for FC Oleksandriya in the Ukrainian Premier League.

He is the product of FC Ametyst Oleksandria sportive school and was born in the teachers family. From 2011 he plays in FC Olekdandriya and was promoted to the Ukrainian Premier League together with team.
