= Serhiy Rusyan =

Ukrainian footballer

Personal information
- Full name: Serhiy Serhiyovych Rusyan
- Date of birth: 5 August 1999 (age 27)
- Place of birth: Makiivka, Ukraine
- Height: 1.79 m (5 ft 10 in)
- Position: Right midfielder

Team information
- Current team: Świt Nowy Dwór Mazowiecki
- Number: 9

Youth career
- 2012–2014: Metalurh Donetsk
- 2015–2016: Arsenal Kyiv

Senior career*
Years	Team	Apps	(Gls)
2016–2017	Arsenal Kyiv	0	(0)
2017–2018	Olimpik Donetsk	0	(0)
2018–2019	Oleksandriya	1	(0)
2019–2021	Dinaz Vyshhorod	10	(0)
2021	Chaika Petropavlivska Borshchahivka	18	(1)
2022	Ahrobiznes Volochysk	0	(0)
2022–2023	Eintracht Hohkeppel	11	(1)
2024	Podhale Nowy Targ	15	(6)
2024–2026	Pogoń-Sokół Lubaczów	48	(4)
2026–	Świt Nowy Dwór Mazowiecki	13	(0)
- * Club domestic league appearances and goals as of 22:20, 3 June 2026 (UTC)

Serhiy Serhiyovych Rusyan (Ukrainian: Сергій Сергійович Русьян; born 5 August 1999) is a Ukrainian professional footballer who plays as a right midfielder for Polish club Świt Nowy Dwór Mazowiecki.
