= Yevhen Banada =

Ukrainian footballer (born 1992)

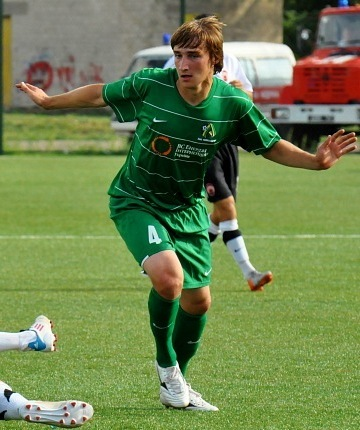

Personal information
- Full name: Yevhen Volodymyrovych Banada
- Date of birth: 29 February 1992 (age 34)
- Place of birth: Nikopol, Ukraine
- Height: 1.82 m (6 ft 0 in)
- Position: Midfielder

Team information
- Current team: Livyi Bereh Kyiv
- Number: 44

Youth career
- 2005: UFK Dnipropetrovsk
- 2006–2008: UOR Donetsk
- 2008–2009: Olimpik Donetsk

Senior career*
Years	Team	Apps	(Gls)
2011–2021	Oleksandriya	215	(23)
2021–2022	Metalist Kharkiv	13	(6)
2022–2023	Kryvbas Kryvyi Rih	18	(0)
2023	LNZ Cherkasy	1	(0)
2024	Veres Rivne	9	(0)
2024–	Livyi Bereh Kyiv	44	(3)

International career^{‡}
2013	Ukraine U21	2	(0)
- * Club domestic league appearances and goals as of 3 June 2026 ‡ National team caps and goals as of 31 May 2014

Yevhen Volodymyrovych Banada (Ukrainian: Євген Володимирович Банада; born 29 February 1992) is a Ukrainian professional footballer who plays as a midfielder for Livyi Bereh Kyiv.

== Club career ==
=== Early years ===
Bananda is a product of the Donetsk city youth football system and Olimpik Donetsk.

=== Oleksandriya ===
His debut at professional level he made in 2011 for Oleksandriya.

=== Kryvbas Kryvyi Rih ===
On 14 July 2022 he signed for Kryvbas Kryvyi Rih.

== International career ==
He was called up by manager Serhiy Kovalets for the squad of the Ukraine national under-21 football team to participate in the 2013 Commonwealth of Independent States Cup in Russia.
