= Oleksiy Dovhyi =

Ukrainian footballer

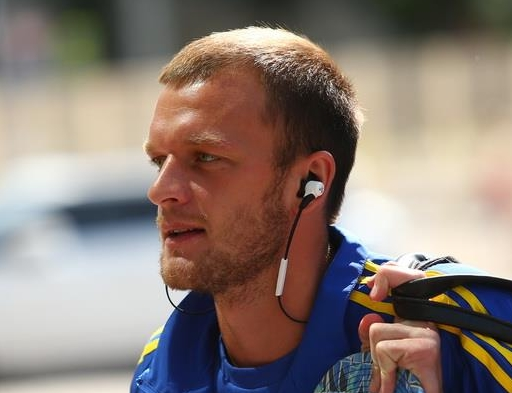
- Oleksiy Dovhyi

Personal information
- Full name: Oleksiy Volodymyrovych Dovhyi
- Date of birth: 2 November 1989 (age 37)
- Place of birth: Kyiv, Soviet Union (now Ukraine)
- Height: 1.86 m (6 ft 1 in)
- Position: Defensive midfielder

Youth career
- 2003: Lokomotyv Kyiv
- 2003–2006: Dynamo Kyiv

Senior career*
Years	Team	Apps	(Gls)
2006–2011	Dynamo Kyiv	0	(0)
2006–2009	Dynamo-2 Kyiv	45	(1)
2008	→ CSKA Kyiv (loan)	13	(0)
2010	→ Volyn Lutsk (loan)	11	(0)
2010–2011	→ Oleksandriya (loan)	26	(2)
2011–2012	Oleksandriya	26	(2)
2012–2014	Illichivets Mariupol	23	(3)
2015	Metalist Kharkiv	24	(2)
2016	Vorskla Poltava	5	(0)
2016–2017	Stal Kamianske	6	(0)
2017–2020	Oleksandriya	48	(3)
2021–2022	Lviv	27	(3)
2022–2024	Rukh Lviv	22	(4)
2024	Zagłębie Sosnowiec	5	(0)

International career
2004–2005	Ukraine U16	17	(0)
2005–2006	Ukraine U17	10	(1)
2007	Ukraine U18	6	(0)
2008	Ukraine U19	8	(1)
- * Club domestic league appearances and goals as of 4 April 2024

Oleksiy Volodymyrovych Dovhyi (Ukrainian: Олексій Володимирович Довгий; born 2 November 1989) is a Ukrainian professional footballer who plays as a defensive midfielder.

== Club career ==
He is product of Dynamo Kyiv academy.

He spent time with different Ukrainian teams that play in the Ukrainian First League and was promoted to the Ukrainian Premier League together with Oleksandriya in 2011.

On 15 February 2024, Dovhyi made his first career move abroad, joining Polish second division club Zagłębie Sosnowiec on a deal until the end of the season. His contract was not extended and he left Zagłębie at the end of June 2024.
