= 2016–17 FC Vorskla Poltava season =

Vorskla Poltava
2016-17 season
- President: vacant
- Manager: Vasyl Sachko
- Stadium: Oleksiy Butovskyi Vorskla Stadium
- Ukrainian Premier League: 7th
- Ukrainian Cup: Quarterfinal
- UEFA Europa League: 3Q
- Top goalscorer: League: Dmytro Khlyobas (8); All: Dmytro Khlyobas (8)
Home colours	Away colours

The 2016–17 season was 21st consecutive season in the top Ukrainian football league for Vorskla Poltava. Vorskla competed in Premier League, Ukrainian Cup and UEFA Europa League.

== Players ==
=== Squad information ===
Squad no.	Name	Nationality	Position	Date of birth (age)
Goalkeepers
1	Bohdan Shust	(Ukraine)	GK	4 March 1986 (aged 31)
12	Bohdan Sarnavskyi	(Ukraine)	GK	29 January 1995 (aged 22)
Defenders
3	Roman Kunyev	(Ukraine)	DF	20 September 1990 (aged 26)
5	Oleh Ostapenko ^{List B}	(Ukraine)	DF	11 June 1997 (aged 20)
17	Volodymyr Chesnakov (Captain)	(Ukraine)	DF	12 February 1988 (aged 29)
20	Mykola Kvasnyi ^{List B}	(Ukraine)	DF	4 January 1995 (aged 22)
23	Vadym Sapay	(Ukraine)	DF	7 February 1986 (aged 31)
28	Vladyslav Bobrov ^{List B}	(Ukraine)	DF	10 May 1996 (aged 21)
33	Oleksandr Chyzhov	(Ukraine)	DF	10 August 1986 (aged 30)
40	Taras Sakiv ^{List B}	(Ukraine)	DF	19 November 1997 (aged 19)
44	Ardin Dallku	(Kosovo)	DF	1 November 1994 (aged 22)
Midfielders
4	Ihor Perduta	(Ukraine)	MF	15 November 1990 (aged 26)
6	Oleksandr Sklyar	(Ukraine)	MF	26 February 1991 (aged 26)
8	Andriy Tkachuk	(Ukraine)	MF	18 November 1987 (aged 29)
10	Serhiy Myakushko (on loan from Dynamo Kyiv)	(Ukraine)	MF	15 April 1993 (aged 24)
11	Vyacheslav Sharpar	(Ukraine)	MF	2 June 1987 (aged 30)
16	Serhiy Ichanskyi ^{List B}	(Ukraine)	MF	1 September 1995 (aged 21)
19	Volodymyr Odaryuk	(Ukraine)	MF	13 February 1994 (aged 23)
29	Dmytro Kravchenko ^{List B}	(Ukraine)	MF	25 February 1995 (aged 22)
35	Oleksandr Maksymenko ^{List B}	(Ukraine)	MF	17 February 1997 (aged 20)
39	Bohdan Melnyk ^{List B}	(Ukraine)	MF	4 January 1997 (aged 20)
82	Pavlo Rebenok	(Ukraine)	MF	23 July 1985 (aged 31)
99	Yevhen Zarichnyuk	(Ukraine)	MF	3 February 1989 (aged 28)
Forwards
7	Mykhaylo Udod ^{List B}	(Ukraine)	FW	17 February 1997 (aged 20)
9	Artur Zahorulko (on loan from Shakhtar Donetsk)	(Ukraine)	FW	13 February 1993 (aged 24)
13	Dmytro Khlyobas (on loan from Dynamo Kyiv)	(Ukraine)	FW	9 May 1994 (aged 23)
24	Oleh Barannik	(Ukraine)	FW	20 March 1992 (aged 25)
25	Dmytro Shapoval ^{List B}	(Ukraine)	FW	17 June 1996 (aged 21)

== Transfers ==
=== In ===
Date	Pos.	Player	Age	Moving from	Type	Fee	Source
Summer
21 July 2016	GM	(Ukraine) Bohdan Shust	30	(Ukraine) Volyn Lutsk	Transfer	Undisclosed	
21 July 2016	MF	(Ukraine) Oleh Holodyuk	28	(Ukraine) Karpaty Lviv	Transfer	Undisclosed	
21 July 2016	MF	(Georgia (country)) Aleksandre Kobakhidze	29	(Ukraine) Dnipro	Transfer	Undisclosed	
21 July 2016	MF	(Ukraine) Yevhen Zarichnyuk	27	(Moldova) FC Milsami Orhei	Transfer	Undisclosed	
25 August 2016	MF	(Uzbekistan) Sanzhar Tursunov	29	(Qatar) Umm Salal SC	Transfer	Undisclosed	
15 September 2016	MF	(Ukraine) Petro Namuilyk	20	(Slovenia) NK Zavrč	Transfer	Free	
30 July 2016	DF	(Ukraine) Andriy Pylyavskyi	27	(Russia) Rubin Kazan	Loan		
5 August 2016	FW	(Ukraine) Artur Zahorulko	23	(Ukraine) Shakhtar Donetsk	Loan		
31 May 2016	FW	(Ukraine) Yevhen Budnik	26	(Ukraine) Stal Kamianske	Loan return		
Winter
19 January 2017	GK	(Ukraine) Bohdan Sarnavskyi	21	(Russia) FC Ufa	Transfer	Free	
22 January 2017	FW	(Ukraine) Roman Kunyev	26	(Ukraine) Kremin Kremenchuk	Transfer	Undisclosed	
6 February 2017	MF	(Ukraine) Vyacheslav Sharpar	29	(Kazakhstan) Atyrau	Transfer	Undisclosed	
8 February 2017	FW	(Ukraine) Mykhaylo Udod	19	(Ukraine) Dynamo Kyiv	Transfer	Free	
1 March 2017	DF	(Ukraine) Oleksandr Chyzhov	30	(Kazakhstan) Okzhetpes	Transfer	Undisclosed	
1 January 2017	FW	(Ukraine) Yevhen Budnik	26	(Belarus) Dinamo Minsk	Loan return		
25 January 2017	DF	(Ukraine) Serhiy Myakushko	23	(Ukraine) Dynamo Kyiv	Loan		

=== Out ===
Date	Pos.	Player	Age	Moving to	Type	Fee	Source
Summer
31 May 2016	GK	(Ukraine) Stanislav Bohush	32	Unattached	Transfer	Free	
31 May 2016	MF	(Ukraine) Artem Hromov	26	(Ukraine) Dynamo Kyiv	Transfer	Undisclosed	
22 June 2016	DF	(Albania) Armend Dallku	33	(Kosovo) FC Prishtina	Transfer	Undisclosed	
20 July 2016	FW	(Ukraine) Oleksandr Kovpak	33	(Ukraine) Cherkaskyi Dnipro	Transfer	Undisclosed	
30 July 2016	MF	(Ukraine) Oleksiy Dovhyi	26	(Ukraine) Stal Kamianske	Transfer	Undisclosed	
31 May 2016	FW	(Ukraine) Anton Shynder	29	(Ukraine) Shakhtar Donetsk	Loan return		
22 July 2016	FW	(Ukraine) Yevhen Budnik	26	(Belarus) Dinamo Minsk	Loan		
31 August 2016	FW	(Ukraine) Oleh Barannik	24	(Ukraine) Hirnyk-Sport	Loan		
Winter
23 November 2016	MF	(Ukraine) Petro Namuilyk	20	Unattached	Transfer	Free	
25 December 2016	MF	(Uzbekistan) Sanzhar Tursunov	29	(Qatar) Al Kharaitiyat SC	Transfer	Undisclosed	
12 January 2017	MF	(Georgia (country)) Aleksandre Kobakhidze	29	(Turkey) Göztepe S.K.	Transfer	Undisclosed	
13 January 2017	FW	(Ukraine) Yuriy Kolomoyets	26	(Hungary) MTK Budapest	Transfer	Free	
31 January 2017	DF	(Ukraine) Oleksiy Dytyatev	28	(Ukraine) Karpaty Lviv	Transfer	Free	
January 2017	GK	(Ukraine) Dmytro Nepohodov	28	(Kazakhstan) Tobol	Transfer	Free	
10 February 2017	FW	(Ukraine) Yevhen Budnik	26	(Austria) Kapfenberger SV	Transfer	Free	
22 February 2017	DF	(Ukraine) Serhiy Siminin	29	(Ukraine) FC Oleksandriya	Transfer	Free	
27 February 2017	MF	(Ukraine) Oleh Holodyuk	29	(Ukraine) Karpaty Lviv	Transfer	Free	
28 February 2017	MF	(Croatia) Mladen Bartulović	30	(Poland) Miedź Legnica	Transfer	Free	
1 January 2017	DF	(Ukraine) Andriy Pylyavskyi	27	(Russia) Rubin Kazan	Loan return		
12 February 2017	GK	(Ukraine) Oleksandr Tkachenko	23	(Ukraine) Hirnyk-Sport	Loan		

== Pre-season and friendlies ==
20 June 2016 Friendly	Vorskla Poltava (Ukraine)	2–0	(Ukraine) Stal Kamianske	Poltava
17:30 EEST (UTC+03:00)	Khlyobas 21'; Budnik 57'	Report		Stadium: Ltava Stadium

26 June 2016 Friendly	Vorskla Poltava (Ukraine)	0–1	(Ukraine) FC Oleksandriya	Poltava
16:00 EEST (UTC+03:00)		Report	Kulish 77'	Stadium: Ltava Stadium

3 July 2016 Friendly	Vorskla Poltava (Ukraine)	0–2	(Romania) CFR Cluj	Rogatec, Slovenia
18:00 EEST (UTC+03:00)		Report	31'; 52'	Attendance: 50

6 July 2016 Friendly	Vorskla Poltava (Ukraine)	2–2	(Serbia) FK Voždovac	Rogatec, Slovenia
18:00 EEST (UTC+03:00)	Dytyatev 36',	Report	Stojanović 43', pen.'	Attendance: 30

10 July 2016 Friendly	Vorskla Poltava (Ukraine)	1–0	(Croatia) HNK Cibalia	Rogatec, Slovenia
18:00 EEST (UTC+03:00)	Kolomoyets 90'	Report

13 July 2016 Friendly	Vorskla Poltava (Ukraine)	4–0	(Hungary) Zalaegerszegi TE
18:00 EEST (UTC+03:00)	Kobakhidze 1'; Khlyobas 37'; Dytyatev 52'; Sapay 66'	Report

4 September 2016 Friendly	Vorskla Poltava (Ukraine)	2–1	(Ukraine) FC Oleksandriya	Poltava
16:00 EEST (UTC+03:00)	Chesnakov 10'; Pylyavskyi 70'	Report	Shendrik 75'	Stadium: Vorskla Stadium

8 October 2016 Friendly	Dnipro (Ukraine)	1–2	(Ukraine) Vorskla Poltava	Horishni Plavni
14:00 EEST (UTC+03:00)	Bokhashvili 6'	Report	Khlyobas 2'; Bartulović 9'

12 November 2016 Friendly	Vorskla Poltava (Ukraine)	2–2	(Ukraine) Dynamo Reshetylivka	Poltava
12:00 EEST (UTC+03:00)	Bartulović 25'; Zarichnyuk 86'	Report	Hrebeniyuk 66'; Romanchuk 90' (pen.)	Stadium: Vorskla train base

16 January 2017 Friendly	Vorskla Poltava (Ukraine)	3–0	(Ukraine) Helios Kharkiv	Kopyly
12:00 EET (UTC+02:00)	Nasibulin 8'; Zahorulko 27'; Zarichnyuk 44'	Report		Stadium: FC Poltava train base

22 January 2017 Friendly	Vorskla Poltava (Ukraine)	1–5	(Bulgaria) Dunav Ruse	Antalya, Turkey
14:30 EET (UTC+02:00)	Dehtyarev 52' (pen.)	Report	Dimov 16'; Chesnakov 18' (o.g.); Shopov 28'; Karagaren 58'; Budinov 74' (pen.)	Stadium: Selin hotel stadium

25 January 2017 Friendly	Vorskla Poltava (Ukraine)	0–1	(Poland) Termalica Nieciecza	Antalya, Turkey
16:00 EET (UTC+02:00)		Report	Kędziora 63'	Stadium: WOW Topkapi Palace

30 January 2017 Friendly	Vorskla Poltava (Ukraine)	2–1	(Bulgaria) Pirin Blagoevgrad	Çolaklı, Turkey
14:30 EET (UTC+02:00)	Zahorulko 41'; Khlyobas 45'	Report	Goal

1 February 2017 Friendly	Vorskla Poltava (Ukraine)	0–0	(Czech Republic) MFK Karviná	Antalya, Turkey
15:30 EET (UTC+02:00)		Report		Stadium: Topkapi WOW Football center Attendance: 100

8 February 2017 Friendly	Vorskla Poltava (Ukraine)	1–1	(Montenegro) Budućnost Podgorica	Antalya, Turkey
15:99 EET (UTC+02:00)	Zahorulko 58'	Report	Raičević 38'

11 February 2017 Friendly	Vorskla Poltava (Ukraine)	2–1	(Belarus) Shakhtyor Soligorsk	Turkey
EET (UTC+02:00)	Odaryuk 58'; Khlyobas 84'	[ Report]	Yanush 29'

14 February 2017 Friendly	Vorskla Poltava (Ukraine)	1–1	(Uzbekistan) Olmaliq FK	Turkey
EET (UTC+02:00)	Sharpar 30'	Report	Urinboev 44' (pen.)

18 February 2017 Friendly	Vorskla Poltava (Ukraine)	0–0	(Slovenia) Olimpija Ljubljana	Turkey
EET (UTC+02:00)		[ Report]

25 March 2017 Friendly	Dynamo Kyiv (Ukraine)	4–0	(Ukraine) Vorskla Poltava	Kyiv
14:00 EET (UTC+02:00)	Harmash 4', 27', 40'; Yaremchuk 63'	Report		Stadium: Lobanovskyi Dynamo Stadium; Referee: Yevhen Aranovsky

== Competitions ==
=== Overall ===
Competition	Started round	Final position	First match	Last match
Premier League	Matchday 1	7th	23 July 2016	31 May 2017
Cup	Round of 16	Quarterfinal	26 October 2016	30 November 2016
Europa League	3Q	3Q	26 July 2016	4 August 2016

Last updated:

=== Premier League ===
==== League table ====
Pos	Team	Pld	W	D	L	GF	GA	GD	Pts	Qualification or relegation
7	Vorskla Poltava (Note: Vorskla Poltava was awarded the UPL Prestige Trophy for winning the consolation tournament.)	32	11	9	12	32	32	0	42	
8	Stal Kamianske	32	11	8	13	27	31	−4	41	
9	Zirka Kropyvnytskyi	32	9	7	16	29	43	−14	34	
10	Karpaty Lviv (Note: Karpaty Lviv was deducted six points according to a decision by FIFA Disciplinary Committee on 4 March 2016.)	32	9	9	14	35	41	−6	30	
11	FC Dnipro (Note: FC Dnipro was deducted a total of 24 points (six points by the FIFA Disciplinary Committee for failing to clear their debts with former coach Juande Ramos and his assistants, six points by the Ukrainian Premier League for failing to comply with the decision of FIFA Disciplinary Committee to pay debts to former player Danilo Sousa Campos, three more points by the FFU Control and Disciplinary Committee for failing execute one of the decisions of the committee, and 9 more points on 9 June 2017, after the end of the tournament.). On the decision of FIFA, FFU enforced relegation of FC Dnipro straight to the Second League, skipping the First League. In a near future FFU will adopt a decision which team will be replacing Dnipro in the First League.) (R)	32	8	13	11	31	40	−9	13	Relegation to Ukrainian Second League
12	Volyn Lutsk (Note: Volyn Lutsk was deducted six points on the request of Football Federation of Ukraine which received a letter from the FIFA Disciplinary Committee on 11 May 2017 urging to implement its decision of 15 March 2017, due to debts with former player Saša Stević.) (R)	32	4	4	24	17	51	−34	10	Relegation to Ukrainian First League

Source: UEFA, Ukrainian Premier League, Soccerway
Rules for classification: 1) Points; 2) Goal difference; 3) Goals scored; 4) Head-to-head points; 5) Head-to-head goal difference; 6) Head-to-head goals scored; 7) Draw.
(R) Relegated

==== Results summary ====
Overall								Home						Away					
Pld	W	D	L	GF	GA	GD	Pts	W	D	L	GF	GA	GD	W	D	L	GF	GA	GD
32	11	9	12	32	32	0	42	5	7	4	17	14	+3	6	2	8	15	18	−3

Last updated: 31 May 2017.
Source: Competitive matches

==== Results by round ====
Round	1	2	3	4	5	6	7	8	9	10	11	12	13	14	15	16	17	18	19	20	21	22	23	24	25	26	27	28	29	30	31	32
Ground	H	A	H	A	H	A	H	H	A	H	A	A	H	A	H	A	H	A	A	H	A	H	H	A	H	A	H	A	H	A	H	A
Result	W	L	D	D	D	W	W	L	L	L	L	W	D	L	L	W	D	W	L	L	L	D	W	L	D	L	W	W	D	W	W	D
Position	5	5	5	5	4	4	4	6	7	7	7	7	7	7	7	7	7	6	7	7	7	7	7	7	7	8	7	7	8	7	7	7

Updated to match(es) played on 31 May 2017. Source: Competitive matches
A = Away; H = Home; W = Win; D = Draw; L = Loss

==== Matches ====
23 July 2016 1	Vorskla Poltava	1–0	Chornomorets Odesa	Poltava
19:30 EEST (UTC+03:00)	Khlyobas 18'; Sklyar (yellow card) 55'	Report	Kutsenko (yellow card) 63'; Khocholava (yellow card) 77'; Korkishko (yellow card) 88'	Stadium: Vorskla Stadium; Attendance: 3,000; Referee: Serhiy Boyko

31 July 2016 2	FC Oleksandriya	3–2	Vorskla Poltava	Oleksandriya
19:30 EEST (UTC+03:00)	Starenkyi 14', (yellow card) 51'; Zaporozhan 16' (pen.); Putrash (yellow card) 24'; Hrytsuk 37'; Novak (yellow card) 90+2'	Report	Sklyar (yellow card) 15'; Kolomoyets 25'; Dytyatev (yellow card) 50'; Khlyobas 57'; Bartulović (yellow card) 86'	Stadium: CSC Nika; Attendance: 1,500; Referee: Mykola Balakin

7 August 2016 3	Vorskla Poltava	1–1	Karpaty Lviv	Poltava
19:30 EEST (UTC+03:00)	Sapay (yellow card) 37'; Zarichnyuk (yellow card) 59'; Kolomoyets 77'	Report	Hrysyo 25'; Ksyonz (yellow card) 56'	Stadium: Vorskla Stadium; Attendance: 1,200; Referee: Anatoliy Abdula

13 August 2016 4	Dnipro	1–1	Vorskla Poltava	Dnipro
19:30 EEST (UTC+03:00)	Cheberyachko (yellow card) 18'; Bliznichenko 53'; Kohut (yellow card) 70'; Polyovyi (yellow card) 72'; Kravchenko (yellow card) 90'	Report	Khlyobas 67'; Chesnakov (yellow card) 71'; Sklyar (yellow card) 77'; Kolomoyets (yellow card) 87'	Stadium: Dnipro-Arena; Attendance: 7,005; Referee: Yevhen Aranovsky

21 August 2016 5	Vorskla Poltava	0–0	Stal Kamianske	Poltava
19:30 EEST (UTC+03:00)	Dytyatev (yellow card) 44'	Report		Stadium: Vorskla Stadium; Attendance: 2,500; Referee: Yuriy Hryso

27 August 2016 6	Dynamo Kyiv	0–2	Vorskla Poltava	Kyiv
19:30 EEST (UTC+03:00)	Moraes (yellow card) 29'; Yarmolenko (yellow card) 64'	Report	Kolomoyets 15'; Kravchenko (yellow card) 36'; Chesnakov (yellow card) 63'	Stadium: NSC Olimpiyskiy; Attendance: 8,837; Referee: Kostyantyn Truhanov

11 September 2016 7	Vorskla Poltava	2–1	Volyn Lutsk	Poltava
17:00 EEST (UTC+03:00)	Khlyobas 20'; Chesnakov (yellow card) 36'; Tursunov 74'	Report	Didenko 26'; Khomchenko (yellow card) 35'; Goropevšek (yellow card) 72'; Shabanov (yellow card) 85'	Stadium: Vorskla Stadium; Attendance: 5,700; Referee: Serhiy Boyko

18 September 2016 8	Vorskla Poltava	0–1	Shakhtar Donetsk	Poltava
19:30 EEST (UTC+3)	Dytyatev (yellow card) 28'; Perduta (yellow card) 90+5'; Sklyar (yellow card) 90+5'	Summary	Fred (yellow card) 32'; Taison 54'; Kobin (yellow card) 90+4'; Dentinho (yellow card) 90+6'	Stadium: Vorskla Stadium; Attendance: 11,000; Referee: Ihor Paskhal

24 September 2016 9	Zorya Luhansk	2–1	Vorskla Poltava	Zaporizhia
19:30 EEST (UTC+03:00)	Ljubenović 42'; Paulinho 83'	Report	Kravchenko (yellow card) 42'; Siminin (yellow card) 70'; Dytyatev 90+4'	Stadium: Slavutych-Arena; Attendance: 3,000; Referee: Kostyantyn Truhanov

1 October 2016 10	Vorskla Poltava	1–2	Olimpik Donetsk	Poltava
19:30 EEST (UTC+03:00)	Holodyuk (yellow card) 24'; Chesnakov 45', (yellow card) 72'; Kobakhidze (yellow card) 47'; Perduta (yellow card) 76'; Siminin (yellow card) 77'; Bartulović (yellow card) 90+1'; Sklyar (yellow card) 90+2'	Report	Doronin (yellow card) 12'; Tanchyk (yellow card) 31'; Hryn 40'; Shestakov 83'; Hoshkoderya (yellow card) 85'; Baranovskyi (yellow card) 90+4'; Khomutov (yellow card) 90+5'	Stadium: Vorskla Stadium; Attendance: 2,500; Referee: Oleksandr Derdo

16 October 2016 11	Zirka Kropyvnytskyi	2–0	Vorskla Poltava	Kropyvnytskyi
17:00 EEST (UTC+03:00)	Pereyra (yellow card) 26'; Moya 51', (yellow card) 62'; Popov 79', (yellow card) 79'	Report	Bartulović (yellow card) 37'; Dytyatev (yellow card) 55'; Perduta (yellow card) 59'; Holodyuk (yellow card) 90+3'	Stadium: Zirka Stadium; Attendance: 2,775; Referee: Serhiy Berezka

22 October 2016 12	Chornomorets Odesa	1–2	Vorskla Poltava	Odesa
19:30 EEST (UTC+03:00)	Khoblenko (yellow card) 6'; Smirnov (yellow card) 41'; Korkishko 48'; Andriyevskyi (yellow card) 79'	Report	Bartulović (yellow card) 39'; Kolomoyets 54', 80'; Holodyuk (yellow card) 81'; Nepohodov (yellow card) 90+1'	Stadium: Chornomorets Stadium; Attendance: 4,012; Referee: Dmytro Kutakov

30 October 2016 13	Vorskla Poltava	2–2	FC Oleksandriya	Poltava
17:00 EET (UTC+02:00)	Chesnakov (yellow card) 28'; Dytyatev (yellow card) 61'; Kobakhidze 90' (pen.); Odaryuk 90+2'	Report	Yaremchuk 1', 21'; Kozak (yellow card) 74'; Ponomar (yellow card) 85'; Basov (yellow card) 89'; Chorniy (yellow card) 90+2'	Stadium: Vorskla Stadium; Attendance: 500; Referee: Yevhen Aranovsky

5 November 2016 14	Karpaty Lviv	1–0	Vorskla Poltava	Lviv
EET (UTC+02:00)	Blanco Leschuk 23'; Nesterov (yellow card) 54'	Report	Dytyatev (yellow card) 47'; Bartulović (yellow card) 51'; Sklyar (yellow card) 59'	Stadium: Arena Lviv; Referee: Serhiy Berezka

20 November 2016 15	Vorskla Poltava	1–2	Dnipro	Poltava
19:30 EET (UTC+02:00)	Tursunov 26'; Bartulović (yellow card) 78'	Report	Rotan 28'; Kozhushko (yellow card) 76'; Luchkevych 77'	Stadium: Vorskla Stadium; Attendance: 1,100; Referee: Oleksandr Ivanov

26 November 2016 16	Stal Kamianske	0–1	Vorskla Poltava	Dnipro
14:00 EET (UTC+02:00)	Zaderaka (yellow card) 21'	Report	Bartulović (yellow card) 28'; Siminin (yellow card) 33'; Dytyatev (yellow card) 35'; Kobakhidze (yellow card) 60'; Chesnakov (yellow card) 69'; Odaryuk (yellow card) 88'; Rebenok 89'	Stadium: Meteor Stadium; Attendance: 700; Referee: Ivan Bondar

3 December 2016 17	Vorskla Poltava	2–2	Dynamo Kyiv	Poltava
14:00 EEST (UTC+03:00)	Dytyatev (yellow card) 10'; Chesnakov (yellow card) 14'; Tursunov 15'; Odaryuk (yellow card) 25'; Rebenok 33'; Bartulović (yellow card) 65'; Siminin (yellow card) 72'	Report	Sydorchuk 4'; Yarmolenko 14' (pen.); Besyedin (yellow card) 70'	Stadium: Vorskla Stadium; Attendance: 1,200; Referee: Yuriy Vaks

10 December 2016 18	Volyn Lutsk	0–1	Vorskla Poltava	Lutsk
14:00 EEST (UTC+03:00)	Memeshev (yellow card) 53'; Andriy Nykytyuk (yellow card) 90'	Report	Sapay (yellow card) 41'; Odaryuk 50'; Kravchenko (yellow card) 59'	Stadium: Avanhard Stadium; Attendance: 870; Referee: Serhiy Berezka

25 February 2017 19	Shakhtar Donetsk	2–1	Vorskla Poltava	Kharkiv
17:00 EET (UTC+02:00)	Bernard (yellow card) 38'; Kovalenko (yellow card) 60' (goal) 63'; Ferreyra 90+1' (yellow card) 90+2'	Report	Khlyobas 27'; Shust (yellow card) 74'; Zarichnyuk (yellow card) 83' (yellow-red card) 90+3'; Odaryuk (yellow card) 85'	Stadium: OSC Metalist; Attendance: 5,058; Referee: Dmytro Kutakov

4 March 2017 20	Vorskla Poltava	1–2	Zorya Luhansk	Poltava
17:00 EET (UTC+02:00)	Chyzhov (yellow card) 23'; Tkachuk (yellow card) 55'; Sharpar 73' (pen.)	Report	Hrechyshkin 24'; Kalitvintsev 45' (pen.); Chaykovskyi (yellow card) 56'	Stadium: Vorskla Stadium; Attendance: 2,532; Referee: Anatoliy Abdula

11 March 2017 21	Olimpik Donetsk	3–2	Vorskla Poltava	Poltava
14:00 EET (UTC+02:00)	Moha 65'; Hryshko 70'; Matyazh 72', (yellow card) 90'; Bohdanov (yellow card) 79'; Khomutov (yellow card) 86'	Report	Khlyobas 21', (yellow card) 21'; Sharpar (yellow card) 45'; Zahorulko 60'	Stadium: Vorskla Stadium; Attendance: 1,000; Referee: Yuriy Mozharovsky

18 March 2017 22	Vorskla Poltava	0–0	Zirka Kropyvnytskyi	Poltava
19:00 EET (UTC+02:00)	Chesnakov (yellow card) 24'; Zahorulko (yellow card) 49'; Perduta (yellow card) 59'; Chyzhov (yellow card) 69'	Report	Drachenko (yellow card) 54'; Chychykov (yellow card) 60'	Stadium: Vorskla Stadium; Attendance: 1,030; Referee: Vitaliy Romanov

1 April 2017 23	Vorskla Poltava	2–0	Volyn Lutsk	Poltava
17:00 EEST (UTC+03:00)	Rebenok (yellow card) 18'; Chyzhov (yellow card) 27'; Sharpar 34', (yellow card) 45'; Khlyobas 62'	Report	Goropevšek (yellow card) 9'; Roman Nykytyuk (yellow card) 90+2'	Stadium: Vorskla Stadium; Attendance: 1,029; Referee: Ihor Kaskhal

8 April 2017 24	Zirka Kropyvnytskyi	1–0	Vorskla Poltava	Kropyvnytskyi
17:00 EEST (UTC+03:00)	Borja Ekiza 33'	Report	Sapay (yellow card) 38'; Odaryuk (yellow card) 69'; Sakiv (yellow card) 85'; Perduta (yellow card) 90+1'	Stadium: Zirka Stadium; Attendance: 1,330; Referee: Ivan Bondar

15 April 2017 25	Vorskla Poltava	0–0	Karpaty Lviv	Poltava
14:00 EEST (UTC+03:00)	Chyzhov (yellow card) 31'	Report	Nesterov (yellow card) 79'	Stadium: Vorskla Stadium; Attendance: 600; Referee: Yaroslav Kozyk

22 April 2017 26	Dnipro	2–0	Vorskla Poltava	Dnipro
17:00 EEST (UTC+03:00)	Kocherhin 15', (yellow card) 86'; Dovbyk 54'	Report	Odaryuk (yellow card) 66'	Stadium: Dnipro-Arena; Attendance: 2,231; Referee: Mykola Kryvonosov

29 April 2017 27	Vorskla Poltava	2–0	Stal Kamianske	Poltava
17:00 EEST (UTC+03:00)	Sharpar 30' (pen.); Rebenok 39'; Tkachuk (yellow card) 65'	Report	Pankiv (yellow card) 28'; Stamenković (yellow card) 66'; Kalenchuk (yellow card) 89'	Stadium: Vorskla Stadium; Attendance: 1,500; Referee: Ivan Bondar

5 May 2017 28	Volyn Lutsk	0–1	Vorskla Poltava	Lutsk
19:00 EEST (UTC+03:00)	Roman Nykytyuk (yellow card) 45+1'; Herasymyuk (yellow card) 58'	Report	Sklyar (yellow card) 21'; Myakushko 24'; Chyzhov (yellow card) 40'; Dallku (yellow card) 78'; Khlyobas (yellow card) 86'; Sakiv (yellow card) 90+3'	Stadium: Avanhard Stadium; Attendance: 1,123; Referee: Oleksandr Ivanov

14 May 2017 29	Vorskla Poltava	1–1	Zirka Kropyvnytskyi	Poltava
14:00 EEST (UTC+03:00)	Chyzhov (yellow card) 18'; Khlyobas 31'; Chesnakov (yellow card) 36'; Myakushko (yellow card) 47'	Report	Pereyra (yellow card) 2'; Dryshlyuk (yellow card) 45+2'; Zahalskyi 73'	Stadium: Vorskla Stadium; Attendance: 725; Referee: Yuriy Hryso

21 May 2017 30	Karpaty Lviv	0–1	Vorskla Poltava	Lviv
14:00 EEST (UTC+03:00)	Hutsulyak (yellow card) 52'; Klyots (yellow card) 76'	Report	Sklyar (yellow card) 32'; Sharpar (yellow card) 43', (goal) 57'; Perduta (yellow card) 88'	Stadium: Arena Lviv; Attendance: 3,750; Referee: Mykola Kryvonosov

27 May 2017 31	Vorskla Poltava	1–0	Dnipro	Poltava
17:00 EEST (UTC+03:00)	Chyzhov (yellow card) 24'; Sharpar 49'; Kravchenko (yellow card) 76'	Report	Rotan (yellow card) 72'	Stadium: Vorskla Stadium; Attendance: 1,700; Referee: Yaroslav Kozyk

31 May 2017 32	Stal Kamianske	0–0	Vorskla Poltava	Dnipro
17:00 EEST (UTC+03:00)	Karasyuk (yellow card) 42'; Kalenchuk (yellow card) 77'; Kravchenko (yellow card) 78'	Report	Sapay (yellow card) 39'; Perduta (yellow card) 70'; Dallku (yellow card) 75'; Shust (yellow card) 77'; Chesnakov (yellow card) 81'	Stadium: Meteor Stadium; Attendance: 420; Referee: Ihor Pashkal

=== Ukrainian Cup ===
26 October 2016 Round of 16 (1/8)	Veres Rivne	0–1	Vorskla Poltava	Rivne
15:00 EEST (UTC+3)	Orlovskyi (yellow card) 16'; Zapadnya (yellow card) 30'	Report	Kolomoyets 25'; Dytyatev (yellow card) 36'; Sklyar (yellow card) 39'; Rebenok (yellow card) 52'; Shust (yellow card) 90+4'	Stadium: Avanhard Stadium; Attendance: 5,436; Referee: Ivan Bondar

30 November 2016 Quarterfinal	Dnipro	1–0	Vorskla Poltava	Dnipro
19:00 EET (UTC+02:00)	Balanyuk 73'	Report	Siminin (yellow card) 62'; Tursunov (yellow card) 81' (yellow-red card) 82'	Stadium: Dnipro-Arena; Attendance: 1,401; Referee: Anatoliy Zhabchenko

=== Europa League ===
28 July 2016 3rd qualifying	Lokomotiva (Croatia)	0–0	(Ukraine) Vorskla Poltava	Zagreb, Croatia
20:00 EEST (UTC+3)	Grezda (yellow card) 57'; Radonjić (yellow card) 84'	Report		Stadium: Stadion Maksimir; Attendance: 328; Referee: Harald Lechner

4 August 2016 3rd qualifying	Vorskla Poltava (Ukraine)	2–3 (2–3 agg.)	(Croatia) Lokomotiva	Poltava
20:00 EEST (UTC+3)	Perić 49' (o.g.); Perduta (yellow card) 60'; Sklyar (yellow card) 64'; Chesnakov 74'	Report	Bočkaj 1'; Fiolić 53'; Capan (yellow card) 60'; Perić 64'	Stadium: Vorskla Stadium; Attendance: 12,000; Referee: Orel Grinfeeld

== Statistics ==
=== Appearances and goals ===
No.	Pos	Nat	Player	Total		Premier League		Cup		Europa League	
No.	Pos	Nat	Player	Apps	Goals	Apps	Goals	Apps	Goals	Apps	Goals
Goalkeepers
1	GK	(Ukraine) UKR	Bohdan Shust	19	0	16	0	1	0	2	0
12	GK	(Ukraine) UKR	Bohdan Sarnavskyi	3	0	3	0	0	0	0	0
Defenders
3	DF	(Ukraine) UKR	Roman Kunyev	5	0	0+5	0	0	0	0	0
5	DF	(Ukraine) UKR	Oleh Ostapenko	1	0	0+1	0	0	0	0	0
17	DF	(Ukraine) UKR	Volodymyr Chesnakov	32	2	28	1	2	0	2	1
23	DF	(Ukraine) UKR	Vadym Sapay	14	0	11+1	0	0	0	1+1	0
33	DF	(Ukraine) UKR	Oleksandr Chyzhov	12	0	12	0	0	0	0	0
40	DF	(Ukraine) UKR	Taras Sakiv	7	0	2+5	0	0	0	0	0
44	DF	(Kosovo) KOS	Ardin Dallku	11	0	10+1	0	0	0	0	0
Midfielders
4	MF	(Ukraine) UKR	Ihor Perduta	32	0	27+1	0	1+1	0	2	0
6	MF	(Ukraine) UKR	Oleksandr Sklyar	18	0	8+7	0	1	0	2	0
8	MF	(Ukraine) UKR	Andriy Tkachuk	26	0	21+2	0	1	0	2	0
10	MF	(Ukraine) UKR	Serhiy Myakushko	14	1	10+4	1	0	0	0	0
11	MF	(Ukraine) UKR	Vyacheslav Sharpar	13	5	13	5	0	0	0	0
16	MF	(Ukraine) UKR	Serhiy Ichanskyi	1	0	0+1	0	0	0	0	0
19	MF	(Ukraine) UKR	Volodymyr Odaryuk	19	2	15+3	2	0+1	0	0	0
29	MF	(Ukraine) UKR	Dmytro Kravchenko	24	0	21+2	0	1	0	0	0
82	MF	(Ukraine) UKR	Pavlo Rebenok	33	3	24+5	3	2	0	1+1	0
99	MF	(Ukraine) UKR	Yevhen Zarichnyuk	12	0	3+6	0	0+1	0	1+1	0
Forwards
9	FW	(Ukraine) UKR	Artur Zahorulko	25	1	6+18	1	0+1	0	0	0
13	FW	(Ukraine) UKR	Dmytro Khlyobas	33	8	23+6	8	1+1	0	2	0
24	FW	(Ukraine) UKR	Oleh Barannik	1	0	0+1	0	0	0	0	0
25	FW	(Ukraine) UKR	Dmytro Shapoval	1	0	0+1	0	0	0	0	0
Players transferred out during the season
3	DF	(Ukraine) UKR	Serhiy Siminin	15	0	12	0	2	0	1	0
7	MF	(Georgia (country)) GEO	Aleksandre Kobakhidze	21	1	16+1	1	2	0	2	0
10	MF	(Uzbekistan) UZB	Sanzhar Tursunov	14	3	9+3	3	2	0	0	0
11	MF	(Croatia) CRO	Mladen Bartulović	20	0	8+8	0	1+1	0	1+1	0
12	GK	(Ukraine) UKR	Dmytro Nepohodov	14	0	13	0	1	0	0	0
26	FW	(Ukraine) UKR	Yuriy Kolomoyets	16	7	11+2	6	1	1	1+1	0
27	MF	(Ukraine) UKR	Oleh Holodyuk	9	0	7	0	1	0	0+1	0
54	DF	(Ukraine) UKR	Oleksiy Dytyatev	20	1	16	1	2	0	2	0
79	DF	(Ukraine) UKR	Andriy Pylyavskyi	8	0	7+1	0	0	0	0	0

Source: Competitions

Last updated: 31 May 2017

=== Goalscorers ===
Rank	No.	Pos	Nat	Name	Premier League	Cup	Europa League	Total
1	13	FW	(Ukraine)	Dmytro Khlyobas	8	0	0	8
2	26	FW	(Ukraine)	Yuriy Kolomoyets	6	1	0	7
3	11	MF	(Ukraine)	Vyacheslav Sharpar	5	0	0	5
4	10	MF	(Uzbekistan)	Sanzhar Tursunov	3	0	0	3
4	52	MF	(Ukraine)	Pavlo Rebenok	3	0	0	3
6	17	DF	(Ukraine)	Volodymyr Chesnakov	1	0	1	2
6	19	MF	(Ukraine)	Volodymyr Odaryuk	2	0	0	2
8	7	MF	(Georgia (country))	Aleksandre Kobakhidze	1	0	0	1
8	9	FW	(Ukraine)	Artur Zahorulko	1	0	0	1
8	10	MF	(Ukraine)	Serhiy Myakushko	1	0	0	1
8	54	DF	(Ukraine)	Oleksiy Dytyatev	1	0	0	1
				Own goal	0	0	1	1

Last updated: 27 May 2017

=== Clean sheets ===
Rank	No.	Pos	Nat	Name	Premier League	Cup	Europa League	Total
1	1	GK	(Ukraine)	Bohdan Shust	8	1	1	10
2	12	GK	(Ukraine)	Dmytro Nepohodov	4	0	0	4
3	12	GK	(Ukraine)	Bohdan Sarnavskyi	1	0	0	1

Last updated: 31 May 2017

=== Disciplinary record ===
No.	Pos	Nat	Player	Premier League			Cup			Europa League			Total		
No.	Pos	Nat	Player	Booked	(yellow card) (yellow-red card)	Sent off (straight red)	Booked	(yellow card) (yellow-red card)	Sent off (straight red)	Booked	(yellow card) (yellow-red card)	Sent off (straight red)	Booked	(yellow card) (yellow-red card)	Sent off (straight red)
1	GK	(Ukraine)	Bohdan Shust	2	0	0	1	0	0	0	0	0	3	0	0
3	DF	(Ukraine)	Serhiy Siminin	4	0	0	1	0	0	0	0	0	5	0	0
4	MF	(Ukraine)	Ihor Perduta	7	0	0	0	0	0	1	0	0	8	0	0
6	MF	(Ukraine)	Oleksandr Sklyar	8	0	0	1	0	0	1	0	0	10	0	0
7	MF	(Georgia (country))	Aleksandre Kobakhidze	2	0	0	0	0	0	0	0	0	2	0	0
8	MF	(Ukraine)	Andriy Tkachuk	2	0	0	0	0	0	0	0	0	2	0	0
9	FW	(Ukraine)	Artur Zahorulko	1	0	0	0	0	0	0	0	0	1	0	0
10	MF	(Uzbekistan)	Sanzhar Tursunov	0	0	0	0	1	0	0	0	0	0	1	0
10	MF	(Ukraine)	Serhiy Myakushko	1	0	0	0	0	0	0	0	0	1	0	0
11	MF	(Croatia)	Mladen Bartulović	7	0	0	0	0	0	0	0	0	7	0	0
11	MF	(Ukraine)	Vyacheslav Sharpar	3	0	0	0	0	0	0	0	0	3	0	0
12	GK	(Ukraine)	Dmytro Nepohodov	1	0	0	0	0	0	0	0	0	1	0	0
13	FW	(Ukraine)	Dmytro Khlyobas	2	0	0	0	0	0	0	0	0	2	0	0
17	DF	(Ukraine)	Volodymyr Chesnakov	10	0	0	0	0	0	0	0	0	10	0	0
19	MF	(Ukraine)	Volodymyr Odaryuk	5	0	0	0	0	0	0	0	0	5	0	0
23	DF	(Ukraine)	Vadym Sapay	4	0	0	0	0	0	0	0	0	4	0	0
26	FW	(Ukraine)	Yuriy Kolomoyets	1	0	0	0	0	0	0	0	0	1	0	0
27	MF	(Ukraine)	Oleh Holodyuk	3	0	0	0	0	0	0	0	0	3	0	0
29	MF	(Ukraine)	Dmytro Kravchenko	4	0	0	0	0	0	0	0	0	4	0	0
33	DF	(Ukraine)	Oleksandr Chyzhov	7	0	0	0	0	0	0	0	0	7	0	0
40	DF	(Ukraine)	Taras Sakiv	2	0	0	0	0	0	0	0	0	2	0	0
44	DF	(Kosovo)	Ardin Dallku	2	0	0	0	0	0	0	0	0	2	0	0
54	DF	(Ukraine)	Oleksiy Dytyatev	8	0	0	1	0	0	0	0	0	9	0	0
82	MF	(Ukraine)	Pavlo Rebenok	1	0	0	1	0	0	0	0	0	2	0	0
99	MF	(Ukraine)	Yevhen Zarichnyuk	1	1	0	0	0	0	0	0	0	1	1	0

Last updated: 31 May 2017
