= 2016–17 FC Oleksandriya season =

FC Oleksandriya
2016-17 season
- President: Serhiy Kuzmenko
- Manager: Volodymyr Sharan
- Stadium: CSC Nika
- Ukrainian Premier League: 5th
- Ukrainian Cup: Round of 16 (1/8)
- UEFA Europa League: 3Q
- Top goalscorer: League: Stanislav Kulish (6); All: Stanislav Kulish (6); Roman Yaremchuk (6)
Home colours	Away colours	Third colours

The 2016–17 season was 5th season in the top Ukrainian football league for FC Oleksandriya. Oleksandriya competed in Premier League and Ukrainian Cup. This was the first season in history of Oleksandriya it took part in European club tournament, representing Ukraine in UEFA Europa League.

== Players ==
=== Squad information ===
Squad no.	Name	Nationality	Position	Date of birth (age)
Goalkeepers
21	Dmytro Rudyk	(Ukraine)	GK	26 August 1992 (aged 24)
24	Vladyslav Levanidov	(Ukraine)	GK	23 February 1993 (aged 24)
54	Andriy Novak	(Ukraine)	GK	6 December 1988 (aged 28)
Defenders
3	Serhiy Siminin	(Ukraine)	DF	9 October 1987 (aged 29)
5	Valeriy Bondarenko	(Ukraine)	DF	3 February 1994 (aged 23)
8	Pavlo Myahkov	(Ukraine)	DF	30 December 1992 (aged 24)
11	Andriy Tsurikov (on loan from Dynamo Kyiv)	(Ukraine)	DF	5 October 1992 (aged 24)
17	Andriy Hitchenko	(Ukraine)	DF	2 October 1984 (aged 32)
25	Serhiy Chebotayev	(Ukraine)	DF	7 March 1988 (aged 29)
26	Anton Shendrik	(Ukraine)	DF	26 May 1986 (aged 31)
40	Yuriy Putrash	(Ukraine)	DF	29 January 1990 (aged 27)
87	Serhiy Basov	(Ukraine)	DF	19 January 1987 (aged 30)
	Ivan Havrushko ^{List B}	(Ukraine)	DF	7 July 1998 (aged 18)
	Kyrylo Prokopchuk ^{List B}	(Ukraine)	DF	14 February 1998 (aged 19)
	Vladyslav Shkinder ^{List B}	(Ukraine)	DF	29 December 1998 (aged 18)
Midfielders
4	Vladyslav Ohirya	(Ukraine)	MF	3 April 1990 (aged 27)
6	Dmytro Leonov	(Ukraine)	MF	6 November 1988 (aged 28)
13	Artem Chorniy	(Ukraine)	MF	23 October 1989 (aged 27)
14	Artem Polyarus	(Ukraine)	MF	5 July 1992 (aged 24)
15	Andriy Zaporozhan (Captain)	(Ukraine)	MF	21 March 1983 (aged 34)
22	Vasyl Hrytsuk	(Ukraine)	MF	21 November 1987 (aged 29)
27	Serhiy Starenkyi	(Ukraine)	MF	20 September 1984 (aged 32)
44	Yevhen Banada	(Ukraine)	MF	29 February 1992 (aged 25)
72	Mykhaylo Kozak	(Ukraine)	MF	20 January 1991 (aged 26)
77	Vakhtang Chanturishvili	(Georgia (country))	MF	5 August 1993 (aged 23)
Forwards
7	Stanislav Kulish	(Ukraine)	FW	8 February 1989 (aged 28)
9	Vitaliy Ponomar	(Ukraine)	FW	31 May 1990 (aged 27)
10	Volodymyr Pryyomov	(Ukraine)	FW	2 January 1986 (aged 31)
	Yaroslav Dovhyi ^{List B}	(Ukraine)	FW	20 February 1998 (aged 19)

== Transfers ==
=== In ===
Date	Pos.	Player	Age	Moving from	Type	Fee	Source
Summer
14 July 2016	MF	(Ukraine) Bohdan Borovskyi	24	(Ukraine) Hirnyk Kryvyi Rih	Transfer	Undisclosed	
24 July 2016	DF	(Ukraine) Andriy Hitchenko	32	(Ukraine) Karpaty Lviv	Transfer	Undisclosed	
29 July 2016	MF	(Ukraine) Vladyslav Ohirya	26	(Ukraine) Olimpik Donetsk	Transfer	Undisclosed	
July 2016	DF	(Ukraine) Maksym Zhychykov	23	(Ukraine) Shakhtar Donetsk	Loan		
14 July 2016	DF	(Ukraine) Andriy Tsurikov	24	(Ukraine) Dynamo Kyiv	Loan		
22 July 2016	FW	(Ukraine) Roman Yaremchuk	20	(Ukraine) Dynamo Kyiv	Loan		
Winter
2 February 2017	MF	(Ukraine) Valeriy Bondarenko	22	(Ukraine) Skala Stryi	Transfer	Undisclosed	
22 February 2017	MF	(Ukraine) Serhiy Siminin	29	(Ukraine) Vorskla Poltava	Transfer	Free	
10 March 2017	MF	(Ukraine) Volodymyr Pryyomov	31	(Iran) Persepolis	Transfer	Free	
16 March 2017	MF	(Georgia (country)) Vakhtang Chanturishvili	23	(Georgia (country)) Dinamo Tbilisi	Transfer	Free	

=== Out ===
Date	Pos.	Player	Age	Moving to	Type	Fee	Source
Summer
29 June 2016	MF	(Ukraine) Denys Dedechko	29	(Russia) FC SKA-Khabarovsk	Transfer	Undisclosed	
12 July 2016	MF	(Ukraine) Oleksandr Huskov	22	(Ukraine) FC Poltava	Transfer	Undisclosed	
26 July 2016	DF	(Ukraine) Maksym Imerekov	25	(Belarus) Torpedo-BelAZ	Transfer	Undisclosed	
August 2016	FW	(Ukraine) Aderinsola Habib Eseola	25	(Ukraine) Arsenal Kyiv	Transfer	Free	
31 May 2016	MF	(Georgia (country)) David Targamadze	27	(Ukraine) Shakhtar	Loan return		
Winter
14 March 2017	DF	(Ukraine) Oleksandr Matvyeyev	28	(Ukraine) Kolos Kovalivka	Transfer	Free	
31 December 2016	DF	(Ukraine) Maksym Zhychykov	23	(Ukraine) Shakhtar Donetsk	Loan return		
31 December 2016	FW	(Ukraine) Roman Yaremchuk	20	(Ukraine) Dynamo Kyiv	Loan return		
24 January 2017	MF	(Ukraine) Bohdan Borovskyi	24	(Ukraine) Inhulets Petrove	Loan		

== Pre-season and friendlies ==
22 June 2016 Friendly	FC Oleksandriya (Ukraine)	1–0	(Ukraine) Olimpik Donetsk	Oleksandriya
17:00 EEST (UTC+03:00)	21'	Report		Stadium: CSC Nika; Attendance: 50; Referee: Andriy Skrypka

26 June 2016 Friendly	Vorskla Poltava (Ukraine)	0–1	(Ukraine) FC Oleksandriya	Poltava
16:00 EEST (UTC+03:00)		Report	Kulish	Stadium: Ltava Stadium

30 June 2016 Friendly	FC Oleksandriya (Ukraine)	2–2	(Slovenia) FC Koper	Slovenia
19:00 EEST (UTC+03:00)	Zaporozhan 28'; Shendrik 28'	Report	Muslimović 52', 75'

3 July 2016 Friendly	FC Oleksandriya (Ukraine)	2–0	(Lithuania) FK Žalgiris	Slovenia
19:00 EEST (UTC+03:00)	Kulish 8'; 33' (o.g.)	Report

6 July 2016 Friendly	FC Oleksandriya (Ukraine)	0–1	(Poland) Jagiellonia Białystok	Slovenia
18:00 EEST (UTC+03:00)		Report	Runje 83'

9 July 2016 Friendly	NK Aluminij (Slovenia)	1–2	(Ukraine) FC Oleksandriya	Slovenia
19:00 EEST (UTC+03:00)	Goal	Report	Chorniy; Imerekov (pen.)

10 July 2016 Friendly	Viitorul Constanța (Romania)	1–1	(Ukraine) FC Oleksandriya	Slovenia
18:30 EEST (UTC+03:00)	Iancu 64'	Report	Shendrik 90+1'

4 September 2016 Friendly	Vorskla Poltava (Ukraine)	2–1	(Ukraine) FC Oleksandriya	Poltava
16:00 EEST (UTC+03:00)	Chesnakov; Pylyavskyi	Report	Shendrik	Stadium: Vorskla Stadium

9 October 2016 Friendly	Zorya Luhansk (Ukraine)	3–1	(Ukraine) FC Oleksandriya	Zaporizhia
15:00 EEST (UTC+03:00)	Matvyeyev 10' (o.g.); Bonaventure 27'; Hrechyshkin 37'	Report	Matvyeyev 32'	Stadium: Torpedo Stadium

13 November 2016 Friendly	Dnipro (Ukraine)	2–2	(Ukraine) FC Oleksandriya	Dnipro
EEST (UTC+02:00)	Lunyov 8'; Svatok 80'	Report	Starenkyi 36'; Hrytsuk 90'	Stadium: Dnipro train base

19 January 2017 Friendly	FC Oleksandriya (Ukraine)	1–1	(Kazakhstan) Altai Semey	Turkey
15:30 EEST (UTC+02:00)	Ponomar 57'	Report	Ersalimov 67'	Stadium: GOLD CITY hotel stadium

22 January 2017 Friendly	FC Oleksandriya (Ukraine)	1–0	(Bulgaria) Slavia Sofia	Turkey
15:30 EEST (UTC+02:00)	Zaporozhan 23'	Report		Stadium: GOLD CITY hotel stadium

25 January 2017 Friendly	Gaz Metan Mediaș (Romania)	0–1	(Ukraine) FC Oleksandriya	Turkey
15:00 EEST (UTC+02:00)		Report	Chorniy 64'	Stadium: GOLD CITY hotel stadium

27 January 2017 Friendly	FC Oleksandriya (Ukraine)	2–0	(Moldova) Zaria Bălți	Turkey
15:00 EEST (UTC+02:00)	Dubajić; Starenkyi	Report		Stadium: GOLD CITY hotel stadium

6 February 2017 Friendly	FC Oleksandriya (Ukraine)	1–1	(Slovenia) NK Maribor	Turkey
16:00 EEST (UTC+02:00)	Uskoković 15' (o.g.)	Report	Bohar 5'

8 February 2017 Friendly	FC Oleksandriya (Ukraine)	2–2	(Kazakhstan) FC Astana	Turkey
16:00 EEST (UTC+02:00)	Habovda 21'; Chorniy 65'	Report	Llullaku 10'; Twumasi 40'

10 February 2017 Friendly	FC Oleksandriya (Ukraine)	1–1	(Czech Republic) Bohemians 1905	Turkey
16:00 EEST (UTC+02:00)	Shendrik 65'	Report	Havel 62'

14 February 2017 Friendly	FC Oleksandriya (Ukraine)	1–0	(Georgia (country)) FC Samtredia	Turkey
17:00 EEST (UTC+02:00)	Zaporozhan 86'	Report

15 February 2017 Friendly	FC Oleksandriya (Ukraine)	Cancelled	(Latvia) Spartaks Jūrmala	Turkey
EEST (UTC+02:00)		[ Report]

15 February 2017 Friendly	FC Oleksandriya (Ukraine)	1–0	(Armenia) Shirak Gyumri	Turkey
16:00 EEST (UTC+02:00)	Basov 36'	Report

25 March 2017 Friendly	Dnipro (Ukraine)	1–0	(Ukraine) FC Oleksandriya	Dnipro
EEST (UTC+02:00)	Adamyuk 15'	Report		Stadium: Dnipro train base

== Competitions ==
=== Overall ===
Competition	Started round	Final position	First match	Last match
Premier League	Matchday 1	5th	23 July 2016	31 May 2017
Cup	Round of 16	Round of 16	26 October 2016	26 October 2016
Europa League	3Q	3Q	26 July 2016	4 August 2016

Last updated:

=== Premier League ===
==== League table ====
Pos	Team	Pld	W	D	L	GF	GA	GD	Pts	Qualification or relegation
1	Shakhtar Donetsk (C)	32	25	5	2	66	24	+42	80	Qualification for the Champions League group stage
2	Dynamo Kyiv	32	21	4	7	69	33	+36	67	Qualification for the Champions League third qualifying round
3	Zorya Luhansk	32	16	6	10	45	31	+14	54	Qualification for the Europa League group stage (Note: Since winners of 2016–17 Ukrainian Cup, Shakhtar Donetsk, qualified for European competition based on their league position, the spot awarded to the cup winner (Europa League group stage) was passed to the third-placed team and the spot for the third-placed team (Europa League third qualifying round) was passed to the fifth-placed team.)
4	Olimpik Donetsk	32	11	11	10	33	44	−11	44	Qualification for the Europa League third qualifying round
5	FC Oleksandriya	32	10	10	12	41	43	−2	40	Qualification for the Europa League third qualifying round
6	Chornomorets Odesa	32	10	8	14	25	37	−12	38	

Source: UEFA, Ukrainian Premier League, Soccerway
Rules for classification: 1) Points; 2) Goal difference; 3) Goals scored; 4) Head-to-head points; 5) Head-to-head goal difference; 6) Head-to-head goals scored; 7) Draw.
(C) Champions

==== Results summary ====
Overall								Home						Away					
Pld	W	D	L	GF	GA	GD	Pts	W	D	L	GF	GA	GD	W	D	L	GF	GA	GD
32	10	10	12	41	43	−2	40	7	6	3	27	16	+11	3	4	9	14	27	−13

Last updated: 31 May 2017.
Source: Competitive matches

==== Results by round ====
Round	1	2	3	4	5	6	7	8	9	10	11	12	13	14	15	16	17	18	19	20	21	22	23	24	25	26	27	28	29	30	31	32
Ground	A	H	A	H	A	H	A	A	H	A	H	H	A	H	A	H	A	H	H	A	H	A	H	H	A	H	A	A	A	H	A	H
Result	L	W	L	L	W	W	L	D	W	W	W	D	D	L	W	D	D	W	W	L	D	L	L	D	L	W	L	L	L	D	D	D
Position	10	6	8	10	5	5	7	7	5	5	4	4	5	5	5	5	5	4	4	4	4	4	5	5	5	4	4	5	5	5	5	5

Updated to match(es) played on 31 May 2017. Source: Competitive matches
A = Away; H = Home; W = Win; D = Draw; L = Loss

==== Matches ====
23 July 2016 1	Dynamo Kyiv	5–1	FC Oleksandriya	Kyiv
19:30 EEST (UTC+03:00)	Sydorchuk (yellow card) 11'; Moraes 26', 56', 62'; Khacheridi (yellow card) 44'; Buyalskyi 70'; Vida 79'	Report	Leonov (yellow card) 19'; Starenkyi (yellow card) 51'; Mykytsey (yellow card) 51'; Myahkov (yellow card) 66'; Banada 86'	Stadium: NSC Olimpiyskiy; Attendance: 10,139; Referee: Kostyantyn Truhanov

31 July 2016 2	FC Oleksandriya	3–2	Vorskla Poltava	Oleksandriya
19:30 EEST (UTC+03:00)	Starenkyi 14', (yellow card) 51'; Zaporozhan 16' (pen.); Putrash (yellow card) 24'; Hrytsuk 37'; Novak (yellow card) 90+2'	Report	Sklyar (yellow card) 15'; Kolomoyets 25'; Dytyatev (yellow card) 50'; Khlyobas 57'; Bartulović (yellow card) 86'	Stadium: CSC Nika; Attendance: 1,500; Referee: Mykola Balakin

7 August 2016 3	Shakhtar Donetsk	1–0	FC Oleksandriya	Lviv
19:30 EEST (UTC+03:00)	Viktor Kovalenko (yellow card) 20'; Ismaily 36'	Report	Starenkyi (yellow card) 12'; Basov (yellow card) 69'	Stadium: Arena Lviv; Attendance: 1,436; Referee: Serhiy Berezka

13 August 2016 4	FC Oleksandriya	0–1	Zorya Luhansk	Oleksandriya
19:30 EEST (UTC+03:00)	Putrash (yellow card) 34'; Tsurikov (yellow card) 39'; Banada (yellow card) 69'; Ponomar (yellow card) 71'; Shendrik (yellow card) 77'	Report	Petryak 17'; Sivakov (yellow card) 63'; Checher (yellow card) 84'	Stadium: CSC Nika; Attendance: 1,641; Referee: Serhiy Boyko

20 August 2016 5	Olimpik Donetsk	0–2	FC Oleksandriya	Sumy
17:00 EEST (UTC+03:00)	Lysenko (yellow card) 31'; Khomutov (yellow card) 38'; Nyemchaninov (yellow card) 45'; Baranovskyi (yellow card) 47'	Report	Chorniy 28', (yellow card) 28'; Hrytsuk (yellow card) 58'; Zaporozhan (yellow card) 66', (goal) 78' (pen.); Hitchenko (yellow card) 67'	Stadium: Yuvileiny Stadium; Attendance: 1,920; Referee: Yaroslav Kozyk

28 August 2016 6	FC Oleksandriya	4–0	Zirka Kropyvnytskyi	Oleksandriya
17:00 EEST (UTC+03:00)	Chorniy 15', (yellow card) 38'; Hitchenko (yellow card) 45+1', (goal) 63'; Hrytsuk 70'; Tsurikov (yellow card) 82'; Ponomar 90'	Report	Lupashko (yellow card) 14'; Zubkov (yellow card) 82'	Stadium: CSC Nika; Attendance: 2,552; Referee: Oleksandr Holovkov

11 September 2016 7	Chornomorets Odesa	1–0	FC Oleksandriya	Odesa
17:00 EEST (UTC+03:00)	Khocholava (yellow card) 48'; Filimonov (yellow card) 56'; Hitchenko 57' (o.g.)	Report	Shendrik (yellow card) 50'; Mykytsey (yellow card) 82'; Hrytsuk (yellow card) 88'	Stadium: Chornomorets Stadium; Attendance: 6,022; Referee: Kateryna Monzul

18 September 2016 8	Volyn Lutsk	1–1	FC Oleksandriya	Lutsk
14:00 EEST (UTC+03:00)	Petrov 28'; Herasymyuk (yellow card) 45+1'; Goropevšek (yellow card) 67'; Khomchenko (yellow card) 72'; Andriy Nykytyuk (yellow card) 90+5'	Report	Ohirya (yellow card) 39'; Polyarus 90+1'	Stadium: Avanhard Stadium; Attendance: 2,100; Referee: Serhiy Berezka

25 September 2016 9	FC Oleksandriya	3–2	Karpaty Lviv	Oleksandriya
19:30 EEST (UTC+03:00)	Zaporozhan 13' (pen.), (yellow card) 79'; Starenkyi (yellow card) 16'; Hrytsuk (yellow card) 57'; Ponomar 71'; Leonov (yellow card) 74'; Basov (yellow card) 76'; Lobay 81' (o.g.)	Report	Ksyonz 10'; Khudobyak (yellow card) 21'; Novotryasov (yellow card) 24'; Chachua 45', (yellow card) 53' (yellow-red card) 77'	Stadium: CSC Nika; Attendance: 1,522; Referee: Yevhen Aranovsky

1 October 2016 10	Dnipro	1–4	FC Oleksandriya	Dnipro
19:30 EEST (UTC+03:00)	Kocherhin (yellow card) 53', (goal) 85'; Rotan (yellow card) 76'	Report	Ponomar 11'; Yaremchuk 16', 61'; Mykytsey 37'	Stadium: Dnipro-Arena; Attendance: 4,825; Referee: Dmytro Kulakov

16 October 2016 11	FC Oleksandriya	2–0	Stal Kamianske	Oleksandriya
14:00 EEST (UTC+03:00)	Starenkyi 55', (yellow card) 79'; Kulish 85'	Report	Kalenchuk (yellow card) 26'; Zaderaka (yellow card) 57'; Ischenko (yellow card) 76'	Stadium: CSC Nika; Attendance: 1,267; Referee: Yaroslav Kozyk

23 October 2016 12	FC Oleksandriya	1–1	Dynamo Kyiv	Oleksandriya
14:00 EEST (UTC+03:00)	Mykytsey (yellow card) 59'; Ponomar 79', (yellow card) 80'; Shendrik (yellow card) 90+1'; Leonov (yellow card) 90+3'	Report	González 52'; Hladkyy (yellow card) 71'; Yarmolenko (yellow card) 75'; Vida (yellow card) 90+3'	Stadium: CSC Nika Stadium; Attendance: 3,692; Referee: Yuriy Hryso

30 October 2016 13	Vorskla Poltava	2–2	FC Oleksandriya	Poltava
17:00 EET (UTC+02:00)	Chesnakov (yellow card) 28'; Dytyatev (yellow card) 61'; Kobakhidze 90' (pen.); Odaryuk 90+2'	Report	Yaremchuk 1', 21'; Kozak (yellow card) 74'; Ponomar (yellow card) 85'; Basov (yellow card) 89'; Chorniy (yellow card) 90+2'	Stadium: Vorskla Stadium; Attendance: 500; Referee: Yevhen Aranovsky

6 November 2016 14	FC Oleksandriya	1–2	Shakhtar Donetsk	Oleksandriya
19:30 EET (UTC+02:00)	Tsurikov (yellow card) 27'; Yaremchuk (yellow card) 31', (goal) 46'; Shendrik (yellow card) 61'; Polyarus (yellow card) 78'	Report	Dentinho 12'; Ferreyra 39'; Srna (yellow card) 45+1'; Fred (yellow card) 70'; Bernard (yellow card) 80'; Ismaily (yellow card) 90+2'	Stadium: CSC Nika; Attendance: 2,987; Referee: Yuriy Hryso

19 November 2016 15	Zorya Luhansk	1–2	FC Oleksandriya	Zaporizhia
14:00 EET (UTC+02:00)	Hrechyshkin (yellow card) 27' (yellow-red card) 67'; Petryak 66'; Karavayev (yellow card) 78'; Rafael Forster (yellow card) 80'	Report	Ohirya (yellow card) 32' (yellow-red card) 77'; Kulish (yellow card) 69', (goal) 90+2'; Mykytsey 70'; Zaporozhan (yellow card) 78'	Stadium: Slavutych-Arena; Attendance: 900; Referee: Anatoliy Zhabchenko

27 November 2016 16	FC Oleksandriya	1–1	Olimpik Donetsk	Oleksandriya
14:00 EET (UTC+02:00)	Zaporozhan (yellow card) 35'; Zaporozhan (red card) HT; Ponomar 78'; Leonov (yellow card) 83'	Report	Postupalenko (red card) HT; Matyazh 50' (pen.)	Stadium: CSC Nika; Attendance: 2,346; Referee: Yuriy Mozharovsky

3 December 2016 17	Zirka Kropyvnytskyi	1–1	FC Oleksandriya	Zaporizhia
19:30 EET (UTC+02:00)	Pereyra (yellow card) 21'; Borja Ekiza (yellow card) 35'; Batsula 90+3'	Report	Shendrik 26'; Kozak (yellow card) 45+1'; Novak (yellow card) 62'; Chebotayev (yellow card) 86'	Stadium: Slavutych-Arena; Attendance: 253; Referee: Anatoliy Abdula

11 December 2016 18	FC Oleksandriya	2–1	Chornomorets Odesa	Oleksandriya
17:00 EET (UTC+02:00)	Mykytsey 17', (yellow card) 21'; Chebotayev (yellow card) 40'; Kozak (yellow card) 65'; Leonov (yellow card) 68'; Hrytsuk 79'; Ponomar (yellow card) 83'; Hitchenko (yellow card) 85' (yellow-red card) 90'; Novak (yellow card) 90+2'	Report	Filimonov (yellow card) 16'; Kovalets 22', (yellow card) 56'; Andriyevskyi (yellow card) 32'; Khocholava (yellow card) 41'; Borovyk (yellow card) 71'; Kalitvintsev (yellow card) 78'; Khoblenko (yellow card) 90+3'; Martynenko (yellow card) 90+3'; Danchenko (red card) 90+3'	Stadium: CSC Nika Stadium; Attendance: 1,951; Referee: Yuriy Vaks

25 February 2017 19	FC Oleksandriya	6–0	Volyn Lutsk	Oleksandriya
17:00 EET (UTC+02:00)	Hrytsuk 15' (pen.); Kulish 27', 70', 88', 90+2'; Zaderetskyi 45+2' (o.g.)	Report	Didenko (yellow card) 44' (yellow-red card) 75'; Chepelyuk (yellow card) 45+1'; Zaderetskyi (yellow card) 79'	Stadium: CSC Nika; Attendance: 2,114; Referee: Mykola Kryvonosov

5 March 2017 20	Karpaty Lviv	1–0	FC Oleksandriya	Lviv
14:00 EET (UTC+02:00)	Khudobyak 39'; Verbnyi (yellow card) 43'; Dytyatev (yellow card) 62'; Zubeyko (yellow card) 78'	Report	Kozak (yellow card) 38'; Basov (yellow card) 61' (yellow-red card) 71'; Tsurikov (yellow card) 69'	Stadium: Arena Lviv; Attendance: 4,143; Referee: Yevhen Aranovskyi

11 March 2017 21	FC Oleksandriya	0–0	Dnipro	Oleksandriya
17:00 EET (UTC+02:00)		Report	Lopyryonok (yellow card) 28'; Kocherhin (yellow card) 56'; Kohut (yellow card) 62'; Balanyuk (yellow card) 83'	Stadium: CSC Nika Stadium; Attendance: 3,520; Referee: Ivan Bondar

18 March 2017 22	Stal Kamianske	4–1	FC Oleksandriya	Dnipro
19:00 EET (UTC+02:00)	Karikari 40' (pen.), 48', 90'; Dovhyi (yellow card) 64'; Pankiv (yellow card) 73'; Deul 86' (pen.)	Report	Starenkyi 19'; Siminin (yellow card) 39' (yellow-red card) 85'; Bondarenko (yellow card) 45'; Basov (yellow card) 57'; Tsurikov (yellow card) 75'; Pryyomov (yellow card) 90'	Stadium: Meteor Stadium; Attendance: 730; Referee: Oleksandr Holovkov

2 April 2017 23	FC Oleksandriya	1–4	Dynamo Kyiv	Oleksandriya
14:00 EEST (UTC+03:00)	Ohirya 7', (yellow card) 90'; Shendrik (yellow card) 26'; Starenkyi (yellow card) 33'; Chanturishvili (yellow card) 60'	Report	Besyedin 60', (yellow card) 71'; Harmash 66'; Yarmolenko 84', 90+3' (pen.)	Stadium: CSC Nika Stadium; Attendance: 5,500; Referee: Yuriy Mozharovsky

9 April 2017 24	FC Oleksandriya	0–0	Zorya Luhansk	Oleksandriya
14:00 EEST (UTC+03:00)	Siminin (yellow card) 60'; Hrytsuk (yellow card) 68'; Levanidov (yellow card) 69'	Report	Hordiyenko (yellow card) 36'; Pylyavskyi (yellow card) 68'; Rafael Forster (yellow card) 90+2'	Stadium: CSC Nika; Attendance: 2,089; Referee: Oleksandr Derdo

15 April 2017 25	Chornomorets Odesa	1–0	FC Oleksandriya	Oleksandriya
17:00 EEST (UTC+03:00)	Khoblenko (yellow card) 14' (yellow-red card) 90+3'; Kapliyenko (yellow card) 24'; Jorge Elias (yellow card) 51'; Andriyevskyi (yellow card) 53'; Korkishko 84', (yellow card) 84'	Report	Banada (yellow card) 40'; Leonov (yellow card) 46'; Ohirya (yellow card) 90+1'	Stadium: CSC Nika Stadium; Attendance: 3,228; Referee: Dmytro Kutakov

22 April 2017 26	FC Oleksandriya	1–0	Olimpik Donetsk	Oleksandriya
17:00 EEST (UTC+03:00)	Shendrik (yellow card) 42'; Polyarus 48', (yellow card) 55'; Levanidov (yellow card) 90+2'; Pryyomov (yellow card) 90+4'	Report	Nyemchaninov (yellow card) 90'	Stadium: CSC Nika; Attendance: 2,100; Referee: Yuriy Hryso

30 April 2017 27	Shakhtar Donetsk	1–0	FC Oleksandriya	Kharkiv
17:00 EEST (UTC+03:00)	Rakitskiy (yellow card) 15'; Kucher (yellow card) 31'; Dentinho (yellow card) 64'; Taison (yellow card) 67'; Ferreyra 81', (yellow card) 87'	Report	Polyarus (yellow card) 33'; Tsurikov (yellow card) 38'; Basov (yellow card) 46'; Chebotayev (yellow card) 57'; Siminin (yellow card) 67'	Stadium: Metalist OSC; Attendance: 6,114; Referee: Yaroslav Kozyk

7 May 2017 28	Dynamo Kyiv	6–0	FC Oleksandriya	Kyiv
19:30 EEST (UTC+03:00)	Yarmolenko 7' (pen.); Besyedin 12'; Pantić (yellow card) 41'; Harmash 45+2', 57'; Morozyuk 73'; Tsyhankov 80'	Report	Siminin (red card) 5'	Stadium: NSC Olimpiyskiy; Attendance: 7,896; Referee: Oleksandr Derdo

13 May 2017 29	Zorya Luhansk	1–0	FC Oleksandriya	Zaporizhia
17:00 EEST (UTC+03:00)	Rafael Forster 51' (pen.); Sobol (yellow card) 84'; Petryak (yellow card) 89'	Report	Kulish (yellow card) 10'; Banada (yellow card) 24'; Novak (red card) 40'; Myahkov (yellow card) 50'; Hitchenko (yellow card) 51'	Stadium: Slavutych-Arena; Attendance: 1,400; Referee: Dmytro Kutakov

21 May 2017 30	FC Oleksandriya	1–1	Chornomorets Odesa	Oleksandriya
19:30 EEST (UTC+03:00)	Zaporozhan (yellow card) 54'; Hitchenko (yellow card) 71'; Hrytsuk 76' (pen.)	Report	Kapliyenko (yellow card) 18' (yellow-red card) 25'; Korkishko 73'; Lyulka (yellow card) 76'	Stadium: CSC Nika Stadium; Attendance: 3,280; Referee: Anatoliy Abdula

26 May 2017 31	Olimpik Donetsk	0–0	FC Oleksandriya	Kyiv
19:00 EEST (UTC+03:00)	Postupalenko (yellow card) 14'	Report	Kulish (yellow card) 26'; Tsurikov (yellow card) 51'; Chebotayev (yellow card) 62'	Stadium: Dynamo Stadium; Attendance: 830; Referee: Kostyantyn Trukhanov

31 May 2017 32	FC Oleksandriya	1–1	Shakhtar Donetsk	Oleksandriya
19:00 EEST (UTC+03:00)	Starenkyi 73'	Report	Boryachuk 73'	Stadium: CSC Nika; Attendance: 5,826; Referee: Yuriy Mozharovsky

=== Ukrainian Cup ===
26 October 2016 Round of 16 (1/8)	Shakhtar Donetsk	2–1	FC Oleksandriya	Lviv
13:30 EEST (UTC+3)	Stepanenko 13'; Dentinho (yellow card) 88'; Marlos 90+2'	Report	Leonov (yellow card) 15'; Chorniy (yellow card) 62'; Basov (yellow card) 88'; Yaremchuk 90+4'	Stadium: Arena Lviv; Attendance: 1,210; Referee: Oleksandr Derdo

=== Europa League ===
28 July 2016 3rd qualifying	FC Oleksandriya (Ukraine)	0–3	(Croatia) Hajduk Split	Oleksandriya
19:30 EEST (UTC+3)	Basov (yellow card) 37'; Banada (yellow card) 37'; Leonov (yellow card) 86'	Report	Kožulj (yellow card) 25'; Nižić (yellow card) 37'; Ćosić 53'; Jefferson (yellow card) 75'; Erceg 82'; Ohandza 90'	Stadium: CSC Nika Stadium; Attendance: 6,800; Referee: Gediminas Mažeika

4 August 2016 3rd qualifying	Hajduk Split (Croatia)	3–1 (6–1 agg.)	(Ukraine) FC Oleksandriya	Split
21:30 EEST (UTC+3)	Nižić 21'; Sušić 52' (pen.), 56'; Vlašić (yellow card) 84'; Bašić (yellow card) 90'; Milić (yellow card) 90+3'	Report	Starenkyi 13'; Mykytsey (yellow card) 24'; Hitchenko (yellow card) 52'; Shendrik (yellow card) 55'	Stadium: Stadion Poljud; Attendance: 25,000; Referee: John Beaton

== Statistics ==
=== Appearances and goals ===
No.	Pos	Nat	Player	Total		Premier League		Cup		Europa League	
No.	Pos	Nat	Player	Apps	Goals	Apps	Goals	Apps	Goals	Apps	Goals
Goalkeepers
24	GK	(Ukraine) UKR	Vladyslav Levanidov	17	0	15+1	0	0	0	1	0
54	GK	(Ukraine) UKR	Andriy Novak	19	0	17	0	1	0	1	0
Defenders
3	DF	(Ukraine) UKR	Serhiy Siminin	9	0	9	0	0	0	0	0
5	DF	(Ukraine) UKR	Valeriy Bondarenko	7	0	4+3	0	0	0	0	0
8	DF	(Ukraine) UKR	Pavlo Myahkov	10	0	3+6	0	0	0	1	0
11	DF	(Ukraine) UKR	Andriy Tsurikov	25	0	23	0	1	0	1	0
17	DF	(Ukraine) UKR	Andriy Hitchenko	21	1	17+1	1	1	0	2	0
25	DF	(Ukraine) UKR	Serhiy Chebotayev	20	0	19	0	1	0	0	0
26	DF	(Ukraine) UKR	Anton Shendrik	26	1	23	1	1	0	2	0
40	DF	(Ukraine) UKR	Yuriy Putrash	7	0	4+2	0	0	0	0+1	0
87	DF	(Ukraine) UKR	Serhiy Basov	25	0	22+1	0	1	0	1	0
Midfielders
4	MF	(Ukraine) UKR	Vladyslav Ohirya	22	1	18+3	1	1	0	0	0
6	MF	(Ukraine) UKR	Dmytro Leonov	20	0	5+13	0	1	0	0+1	0
13	MF	(Ukraine) UKR	Artem Chorniy	16	2	8+7	2	1	0	0	0
14	MF	(Ukraine) UKR	Artem Polyarus	20	2	15+5	2	0	0	0	0
15	MF	(Ukraine) UKR	Andriy Zaporozhan	26	3	23+1	3	0+1	0	1	0
22	MF	(Ukraine) UKR	Vasyl Hrytsuk	28	5	20+5	5	0+1	0	0+2	0
27	MF	(Ukraine) UKR	Serhiy Starenkyi	25	5	16+7	4	1	0	1	1
44	MF	(Ukraine) UKR	Yevhen Banada	26	1	23+1	1	0	0	2	0
72	MF	(Ukraine) UKR	Mykhaylo Kozak	15	0	8+5	0	0	0	2	0
77	MF	(Georgia (country)) GEO	Vakhtang Chanturishvili	4	0	0+4	0	0	0	0	0
Forwards
7	FW	(Ukraine) UKR	Stanislav Kulish	23	6	8+12	6	0+1	0	1+1	0
9	FW	(Ukraine) UKR	Vitaliy Ponomar	33	5	26+5	5	0	0	2	0
10	FW	(Ukraine) UKR	Volodymyr Pryyomov	7	0	1+6	0	0	0	0	0
Disqualified
3	DF	(Ukraine) UKR	Stanislav Mykytsey	14	3	12	3	0	0	2	0
Players transferred out during the season
10	FW	(Ukraine) UKR	Roman Yaremchuk	17	6	11+3	5	1	1	1+1	0
12	DF	(Ukraine) UKR	Maksym Zhychykov	4	0	1+2	0	0	0	1	0

Source: Competitions

Last updated: 31 May 2017

=== Goalscorers ===
Rank	No.	Pos	Nat	Name	Premier League	Cup	Europa League	Total
1	7	FW	(Ukraine)	Stanislav Kulish	6	0	0	6
1	10	FW	(Ukraine)	Roman Yaremchuk	5	1	0	6
3	9	FW	(Ukraine)	Vitaliy Ponomar	5	0	0	5
3	22	MF	(Ukraine)	Vasyl Hrytsuk	5	0	0	5
3	27	MF	(Ukraine)	Serhiy Starenkyi	4	0	1	5
6	3	DF	(Ukraine)	Stanislav Mykytsey	3	0	0	3
6	15	MF	(Ukraine)	Andriy Zaporozhan	3	0	0	3
8	13	MF	(Ukraine)	Artem Chorniy	2	0	0	2
8	14	MF	(Ukraine)	Artem Polyarus	2	0	0	2
10	4	MF	(Ukraine)	Vladyslav Ohirya	1	0	0	1
10	17	DF	(Ukraine)	Andriy Hitchenko	1	0	0	1
10	26	DF	(Ukraine)	Anton Shendrik	1	0	0	1
10	44	MF	(Ukraine)	Yevhen Banada	1	0	0	1
				Own goal	2	0	0	2

Last updated: 31 May 2017

=== Clean sheets ===
Rank	No.	Pos	Nat	Name	Premier League	Cup	Europa League	Total
1	24	GK	(Ukraine)	Vladyslav Levanidov	5	0	0	5
2	54	GK	(Ukraine)	Andriy Novak	3	0	0	3

Last updated: 26 May 2017

=== Disciplinary record ===
No.	Pos	Nat	Player	Premier League			Cup			Europa League			Total		
No.	Pos	Nat	Player	Booked	(yellow card) (yellow-red card)	Sent off (straight red)	Booked	(yellow card) (yellow-red card)	Sent off (straight red)	Booked	(yellow card) (yellow-red card)	Sent off (straight red)	Booked	(yellow card) (yellow-red card)	Sent off (straight red)
3	DF	(Ukraine)	Stanislav Mykytsey	4	0	0	0	0	0	1	0	0	5	0	0
3	DF	(Ukraine)	Serhiy Siminin	2	1	1	0	0	0	0	0	0	2	1	1
4	MF	(Ukraine)	Vladyslav Ohirya	3	1	0	0	0	0	0	0	0	3	1	0
5	DF	(Ukraine)	Valeriy Bondarenko	1	0	0	0	0	0	0	0	0	1	0	0
6	MF	(Ukraine)	Dmytro Leonov	5	0	0	1	0	0	1	0	0	7	0	0
7	FW	(Ukraine)	Stanislav Kulish	3	0	0	0	0	0	0	0	0	3	0	0
8	DF	(Ukraine)	Pavlo Myahkov	2	0	0	0	0	0	0	0	0	2	0	0
9	FW	(Ukraine)	Vitaliy Ponomar	4	0	0	0	0	0	0	0	0	4	0	0
10	FW	(Ukraine)	Roman Yaremchuk	1	0	0	0	0	0	0	0	0	1	0	0
10	FW	(Ukraine)	Volodymyr Pryyomov	2	0	0	0	0	0	0	0	0	2	0	0
11	DF	(Ukraine)	Andriy Tsurikov	7	0	0	0	0	0	0	0	0	7	0	0
13	MF	(Ukraine)	Artem Chorniy	3	0	0	1	0	0	0	0	0	4	0	0
14	MF	(Ukraine)	Artem Polyarus	3	0	0	0	0	0	0	0	0	3	0	0
15	MF	(Ukraine)	Andriy Zaporozhan	5	0	1	0	0	0	0	0	0	5	0	1
17	DF	(Ukraine)	Andriy Hitchenko	4	1	0	0	0	0	1	0	0	5	1	0
22	MF	(Ukraine)	Vasyl Hrytsuk	4	0	0	0	0	0	0	0	0	4	0	0
24	GK	(Ukraine)	Vladyslav Levanidov	2	0	0	0	0	0	0	0	0	2	0	0
25	DF	(Ukraine)	Serhiy Chebotayev	4	0	0	0	0	0	0	0	0	4	0	0
26	DF	(Ukraine)	Anton Shendrik	6	0	0	0	0	0	1	0	0	7	0	0
27	MF	(Ukraine)	Serhiy Starenkyi	6	0	0	0	0	0	0	0	0	6	0	0
40	DF	(Ukraine)	Yuriy Putrash	2	0	0	0	0	0	0	0	0	2	0	0
44	MF	(Ukraine)	Yevhen Banada	3	0	0	0	0	0	1	0	0	4	0	0
54	DF	(Ukraine)	Andriy Novak	3	0	1	0	0	0	0	0	0	3	0	1
72	MF	(Ukraine)	Mykhaylo Kozak	4	0	0	0	0	0	0	0	0	4	0	0
77	MF	(Georgia (country))	Vakhtang Chanturishvili	1	0	0	0	0	0	0	0	0	1	0	0
87	DF	(Ukraine)	Serhiy Basov	5	1	0	1	0	0	1	0	0	7	1	0

Last updated: 26 May 2017
