= Shust =

Shust can refer to:

- Aaron Shust (b. 1975), American musician
- Bohdan Shust (b. 1986), Ukrainian football player
