= Oleksandr Chyzhov =

Ukrainian footballer (born 1986)

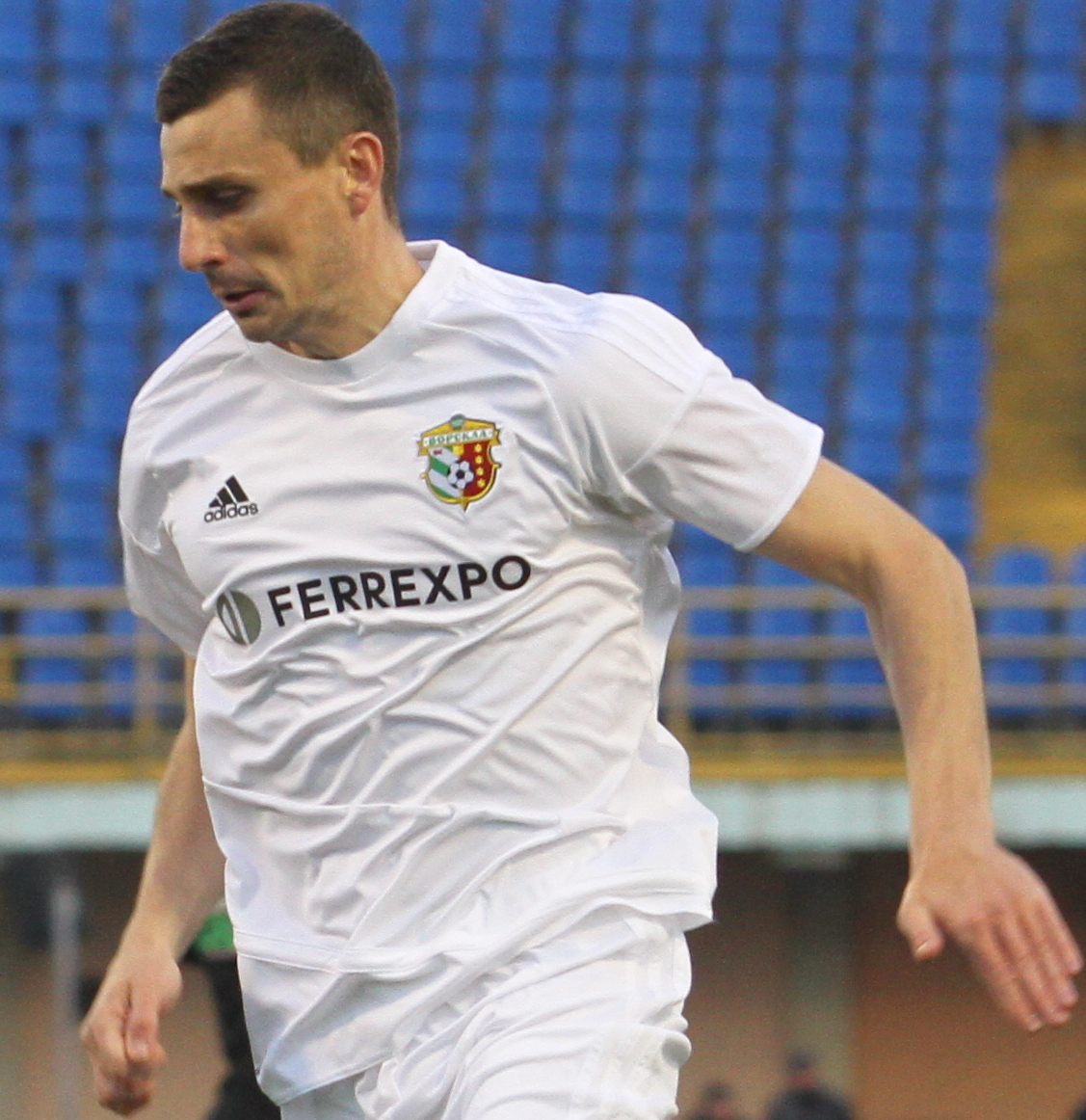

Personal information
- Full name: Oleksandr Oleksandrovych Chyzhov
- Date of birth: 10 August 1986 (age 40)
- Place of birth: Poltava, Ukrainian SSR
- Height: 1.89 m (6 ft 2 in)
- Position: Defender

Youth career
- 1999–2002: Horpynko Youth Sportive School Poltava
- 2002–2003: Molod Poltava
- 2004–2006: Vorskla Poltava

Senior career*
| Years | Team | Apps | (Gls) |
| 2004–2008 | Vorskla Poltava | 57 | (2) |
| 2004–2005 | → Vorskla-2 Poltava | 17 | (1) |
| 2008–2013 | Shakhtar Donetsk | 27 | (0) |
| 2012–2013 | → Illichivets Mariupol (loan) | 21 | (1) |
| 2013 | → Sevastopol (loan) | 6 | (0) |
| 2014 | Illichivets Mariupol | 5 | (0) |
| 2015–2016 | Okzhetpes | 56 | (2) |
| 2017–2019 | Vorskla Poltava | 47 | (3) |
| Total | | 236 | (9) |

International career
| 2007 | Ukraine U21 | 6 | (0) |

Managerial career
- 2019: Vorskla Poltava (U19)
- 2019–2020: Vorskla Poltava (U19 assistant)
- 2022–2023: Zorya Luhansk (assistant)
- 2023: Shakhtar Donetsk (assistant)
- 2024–2025: Metalist 1925 Kharkiv (assistant)
- 2025: Metalist 1925 Kharkiv (caretaker)
- * Club domestic league appearances and goals

Oleksandr Oleksandrovych Chyzhov (Ukrainian: Олександр Олександрович Чижов; born 10 August 1986) is a Ukrainian retired footballer who played as a defender. On August 20, 2024, he became the assistant head coach of Metalist 1925 Kharkiv in Patrick van Leeuwen's coaching staff. On May 20, 2025, after van Leeuwen was removed from his position, Chizhov became the caretaker of Metalist 1925.

== Career statistics ==
As of match played 2 March 2017

Appearances and goals by club, season and competition
| Club | Season | League | | National Cup | | Continental | | Super Cup | | Total | |
| Club | Season | Apps | Goals | Apps | Goals | Apps | Goals | Apps | Goals | Apps | Goals |
|---|---|---|---|---|---|---|---|---|---|---|---|
| Vorskla | 2005–06 | 9 | 1 | 0 | 0 | 0 | 0 | 0 | 0 | 9 | 1 |
| Vorskla | 2006–07 | 21 | 1 | 0 | 0 | 0 | 0 | 0 | 0 | 21 | 1 |
| Vorskla | 2007–08 | 24 | 0 | 1 | 0 | 0 | 0 | 0 | 0 | 25 | 0 |
| Total | | 54 | 2 | 1 | 0 | 0 | 0 | 0 | 0 | 55 | 2 |
| Shakhtar | 2008–09 | 9 | 0 | 0 | 0 | 0 | 0 | 0 | 0 | 9 | 0 |
| Shakhtar | 2009–10 | 9 | 0 | 1 | 0 | 1 | 0 | 0 | 0 | 11 | 0 |
| Shakhtar | 2010–11 | 6 | 0 | 2 | 0 | 0 | 0 | 1 | 0 | 9 | 0 |
| Shakhtar | 2011–12 | 3 | 0 | 2 | 0 | 2 | 0 | 0 | 0 | 7 | 0 |
| Total for Shakhtar | | 27 | 0 | 5 | 0 | 3 | 0 | 1 | 0 | 36 | 0 |
| Illichivets (loan) | 2012–13 | 20 | 1 | 2 | 0 | 0 | 0 | 0 | 0 | 22 | 1 |
| Illichivets (loan) | 2013–14 | 1 | 0 | 0 | 0 | 0 | 0 | 0 | 0 | 1 | 0 |
| Total | | 21 | 1 | 2 | 0 | 0 | 0 | 0 | 0 | 23 | 1 |
| Sevastopol (loan) | 2013–14 | 6 | 0 | 0 | 0 | 0 | 0 | 0 | 0 | 6 | 0 |
| Total for Sevastopol | | 6 | 0 | 0 | 0 | 0 | 0 | 0 | 0 | 6 | 0 |
| Illichivets | 2014–15 | 5 | 0 | 0 | 0 | 0 | 0 | 0 | 0 | 5 | 0 |
| Total for Illichivets | | 26 | 1 | 2 | 0 | 0 | 0 | 0 | 0 | 28 | 1 |
| Okzhetpes | 2015 | 30 | 0 | 1 | 0 | 0 | 0 | 0 | 0 | 31 | 0 |
| Okzhetpes | 2016 | 26 | 2 | 2 | 0 | 0 | 0 | 0 | 0 | 28 | 2 |
| Total for Okzhetpes | | 56 | 2 | 3 | 0 | 0 | 0 | 0 | 0 | 59 | 2 |
| Vorskla | 2016–17 | 0 | 0 | 0 | 0 | 0 | 0 | 0 | 0 | 0 | 0 |
| Career total | | 169 | 5 | 11 | 0 | 3 | 0 | 1 | 0 | 184 | 5 |

== Honours ==
=== Club ===
Shakhtar Donetsk

- Ukrainian Premier League (3) : 2009–10, 2010–11, 2011–12
- Ukrainian Cup (2) : 2010–11, 2011–12
- Ukrainian Super Cup (2) : 2008, 2010
- UEFA Cup: 2008–09
