= Serhiy Ichanskyi =

Ukrainian footballer

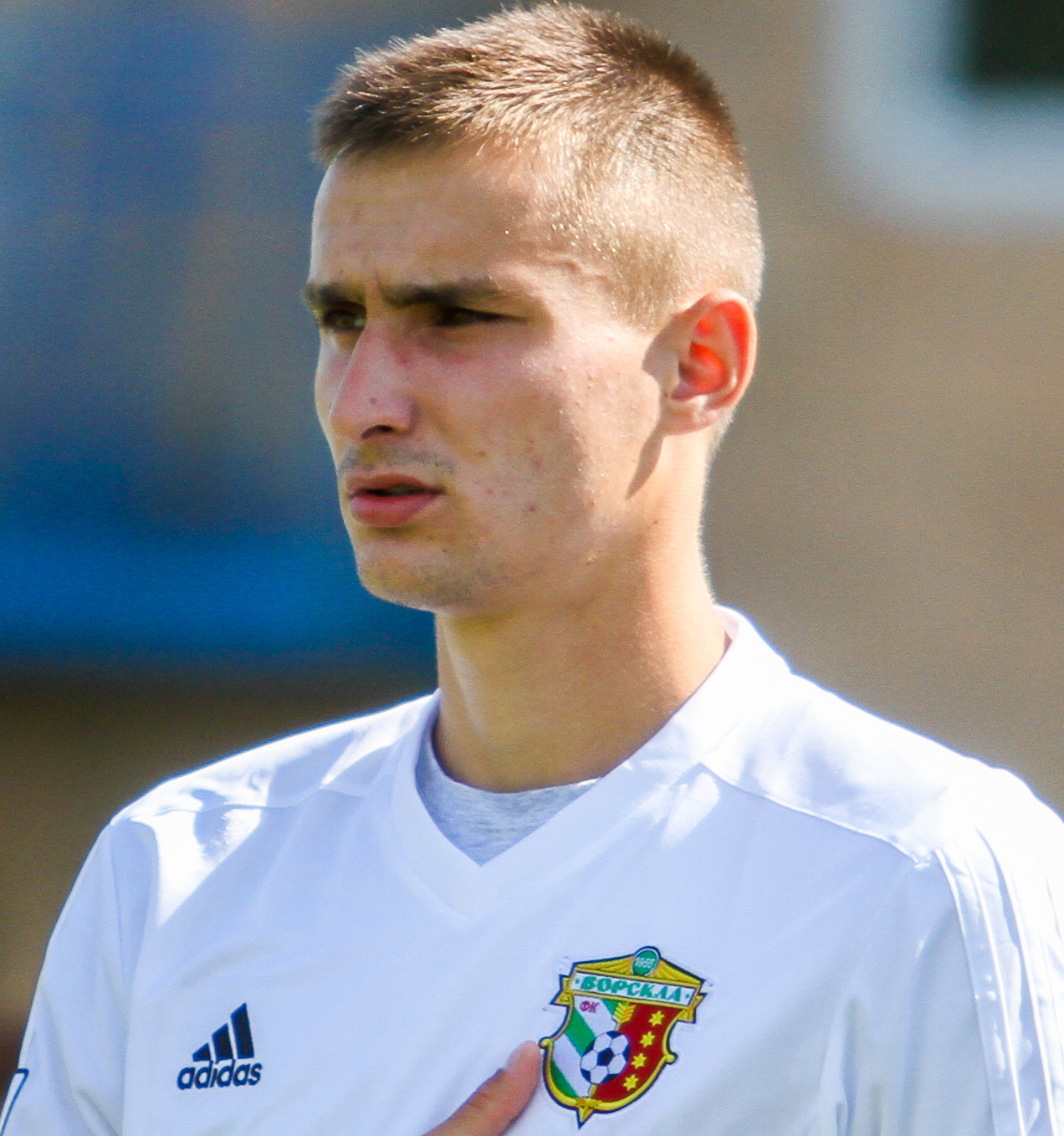

Personal information
- Full name: Serhiy Mykolayovych Ichanskyi
- Date of birth: 1 September 1995 (age 31)
- Place of birth: Ukraine
- Height: 1.80 m (5 ft 11 in)
- Position: Midfielder

Team information
- Current team: Dinaz Vyshhorod
- Number: 5

Youth career
- –2012: Vorskla Poltava

Senior career*
Years	Team	Apps	(Gls)
2012–2017	Vorskla Poltava	1	(0)
2017	Cherkaskyi Dnipro	15	(0)
2018	Kobra Kharkiv	3	(0)
2019–	Dinaz Vyshhorod	38	(4)
- * Club domestic league appearances and goals as of 31 August 2021

Serhiy Ichanskyi (Ukrainian: Сергій Миколайович Ічанський; born 1 September 1995) is a Ukrainian professional footballer who plays as a midfielder for Dinaz Vyshhorod.

== Career ==
Ichanskyi spent his career in the Ukrainian Premier League Reserves with FC Vorskla Poltava. In summer 2015, he was promoted to the senior squad in the Ukrainian Premier League. He made his senior debut against FC Volyn Lutsk on 10 December 2016.
