= Yevhen Zarichnyuk =

Ukrainian footballer

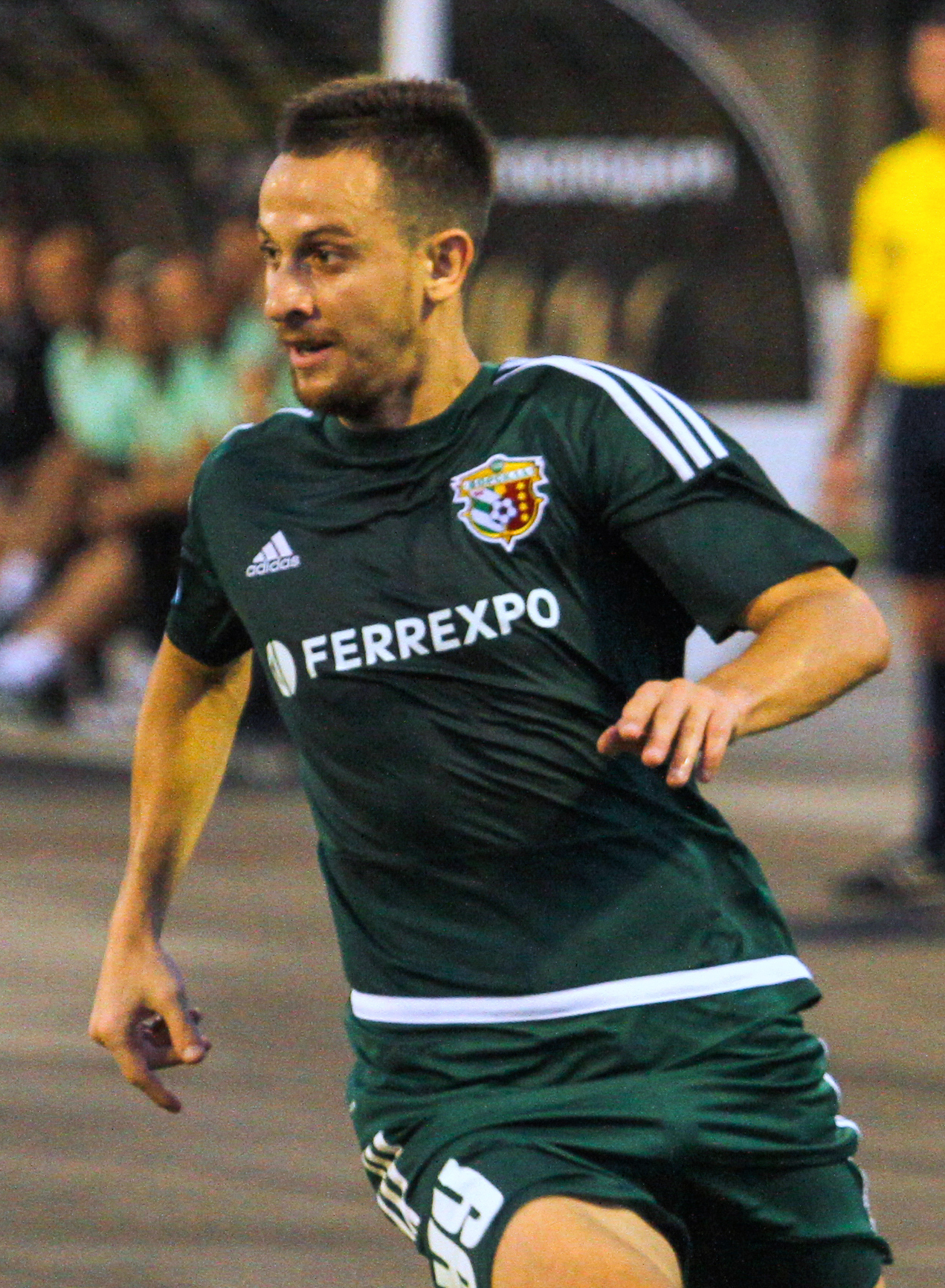

Personal information
- Full name: Yevhen Mykolayovych Zarichnyuk
- Date of birth: 3 February 1989 (age 37)
- Place of birth: Kyiv, Soviet Union (now Ukraine)
- Height: 1.78 m (5 ft 10 in)
- Position: Left midfielder

Youth career
- 2004: Arsenal Kyiv
- 2005–2006: BVUFK Brovary
- 2006: Kosmos Zaporizhzhia

Senior career*
Years	Team	Apps	(Gls)
2006	Nafkom Brovary	11	(0)
2007	Lviv	20	(1)
2008	Stal Alchevsk	2	(0)
2009	Irpin Horenychi	2	(0)
2009–2012	Obolon Kyiv	5	(0)
2011	→ Desna Chernihiv (loan)	5	(1)
2011	→ Mykolaiv (loan)	20	(2)
2012	→ Tiraspol (loan)	13	(5)
2012–2015	Tiraspol	76	(15)
2015–2016	Milsami Orhei	20	(1)
2016–2017	Vorskla Poltava	9	(0)
2017	Mykolaiv	10	(1)
2018	Volyn Lutsk	7	(0)
2018	Ahrobiznes Volochysk	8	(0)
2019–2020	Mykolaiv	16	(1)
2019	→ Mykolaiv-2	11	(7)
2020–2021	Rubikon Kyiv	19	(1)
2021–2022	Olimpik Donetsk	13	(0)
- * Club domestic league appearances and goals as of 12 February 2022

Yevhen Mykolayovych Zarichnyuk (Ukrainian: Євген Миколайович Зарічнюк; born 3 February 1989) is a Ukrainian professional footballer who plays as a left midfielder.
