= Oleksandr Huskov =

Ukrainian footballer (born 1994)

Personal information
- Full name: Oleksandr Volodymyrovych Huskov
- Date of birth: 22 January 1994 (age 32)
- Place of birth: Znamianka, Ukraine
- Height: 1.75 m (5 ft 9 in)
- Position: Midfielder

Youth career
- 200?–2008: Youth Sportive School Znamianka
- 2008–2011: Ametyst Oleksandria

Senior career*
Years	Team	Apps	(Gls)
2011–2016	Oleksandriya	7	(1)
2016	Poltava	10	(1)
2017	Bukovyna Chernivtsi	15	(2)
2017–2020	Obolon-Brovar Kyiv	84	(3)
2020–2021	Kryvbas Kryvyi Rih	11	(0)
2021	Livyi Bereh Kyiv	11	(2)
2022–	Chaika Petropavlivska Borshchahivka		
- * Club domestic league appearances and goals as of 9 December 2021

Oleksandr Volodymyrovych Huskov (Ukrainian: Олександр Володимирович Гуськов; born 22 January 1994) is a professional Ukrainian football midfielder who last played for Livyi Bereh Kyiv.

He is the product of Youth Sportive School Znamianka and FC Ametyst Oleksandria sportive school and his first trainer was Serhiy Hrinkevych.
