= Pavlo Myahkov =

Ukrainian footballer (born 1992)

Personal information
- Full name: Pavlo Serhiyovych Myahkov
- Date of birth: 30 December 1992 (age 33)
- Place of birth: Melitopol, Ukraine
- Height: 1.78 m (5 ft 10 in)
- Position: Midfielder

Youth career
- 2006–2007: FC Melitopol
- 2007: Metalurh Zaporizhia
- 2008: FC Melitopol

Senior career*
Years	Team	Apps	(Gls)
2009–2010	Olkom Melitopol	33	(2)
2011–2015	Zorya Luhansk	4	(0)
2015–2017	Oleksandriya	29	(2)
2017	Minsk	15	(0)
2018	Veres Rivne	10	(0)
2018–2019	Ruch Chorzów	12	(0)
2019–2020	Metalurh Zaporizhya	14	(0)
2020–2021	Kremin Kremenchuk	24	(0)
2021	Kramatorsk	15	(0)
2022	FC Yalta		
2023	NovAvtoTrans Novovasylivka		

International career
2012–2013	Ukraine U21	3	(0)
- * Club domestic league appearances and goals as of 31 December 2021

Pavlo Myahkov (Ukrainian: Павло Сергійович М`ягков; born 30 December 1992) is a Ukrainian professional footballer who plays as a midfielder.

== Career ==
Myahkov is a product of the youth team systems of FC Melitopol. After playing for the Ukrainian Second League club Olkom Melitopol, he signed a contract with Zorya Luhansk in February 2011.

He was called up by Pavlo Yakovenko to play for the Ukraine U21 team in the 2012 Commonwealth Cup.
