= Petro Namuilyk =

Ukrainian footballer

Personal information
- Full name: Petro Petrovych Namuilyk
- Date of birth: 13 March 1996 (age 30)
- Place of birth: Kuznetsovsk, Ukraine
- Height: 1.81 m (5 ft 11 1/2 in)
- Position: Midfielder

Youth career
- Karpaty Lviv

Senior career*
Years	Team	Apps	(Gls)
2013–2015	Karpaty Lviv	0	(0)
2016	Zavrč	0	(0)
2016–2017	Vorskla Poltava	0	(0)
2017–2018	Skala Stryi	25	(3)
2018–2019	Podillya Khmelnytskyi	4	(0)
2020–2021	Pärnu JK Vaprus	17	(5)
- * Club domestic league appearances and goals as of 22 September 2021

Petro Namuilyk (Ukrainian: Петро Петрович Намуйлик; born 13 March 1996) is a Ukrainian professional footballer.
