= Roman Kunyev =

Ukrainian footballer

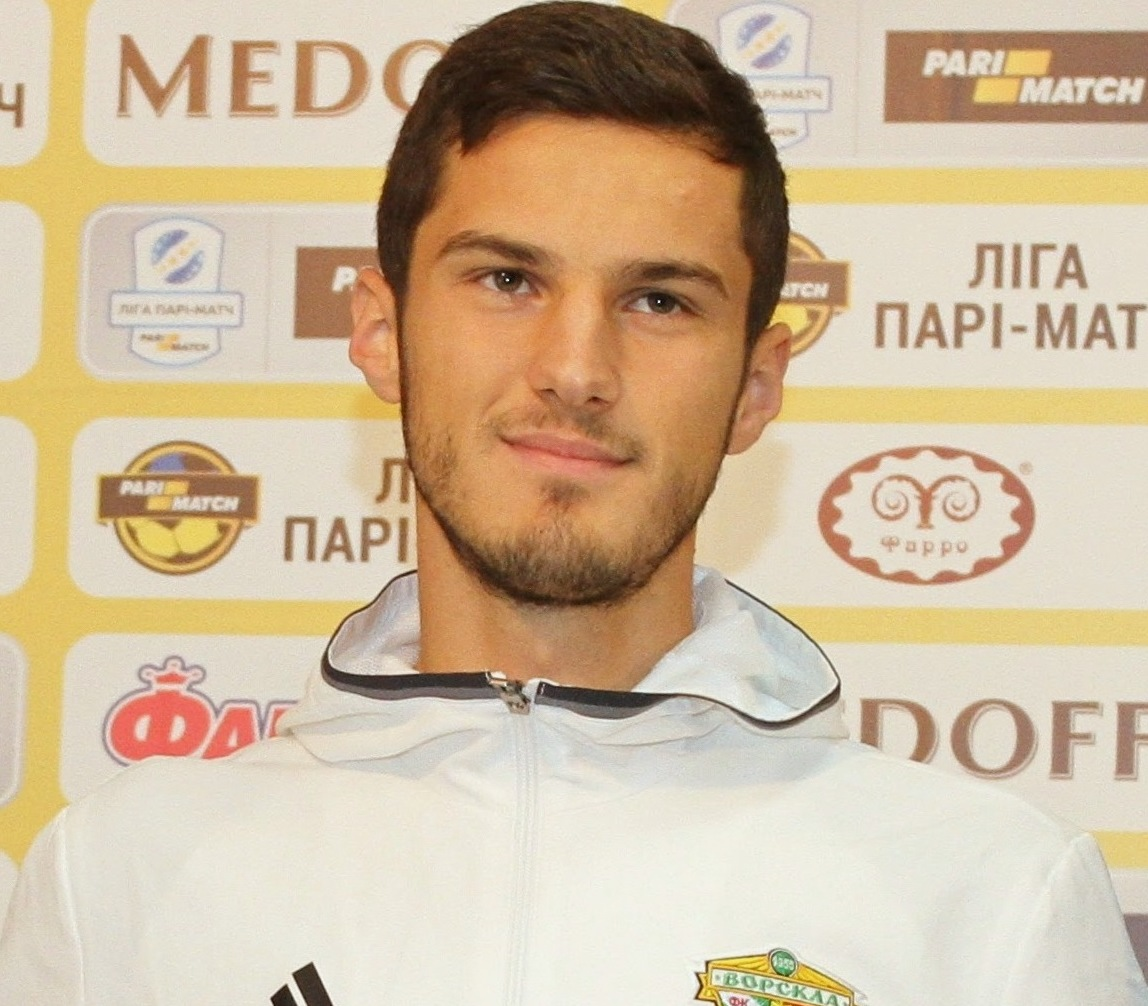

Personal information
- Full name: Roman Petrovych Kunyev
- Date of birth: 20 September 1990 (age 36)
- Place of birth: Kremenchuk, Ukrainian SSR
- Height: 1.84 m (6 ft 1/2 in)
- Position: Attacking midfielder

Team information
- Current team: Olimpiya Savyntsi
- Number: 25

Youth career
- 2003–2007: Kremin Kremenchuk

Senior career*
Years	Team	Apps	(Gls)
2007–2008	Kremin Kremenchuk	57	(13)
2009–2012	Vorskla Poltava	0	(0)
2011–2012	→ Kremin Kremenchuk (loan)	25	(1)
2012–2013	Kremin Kremenchuk	17	(7)
2013–2015	Vorskla Poltava	4	(0)
2013–2015	→ Kremin Kremenchuk (loan)	45	(1)
2015–2016	Kremin Kremenchuk	34	(0)
2017–2018	Vorskla Poltava	5	(0)
2018	Hirnyk-Sport Horishni Plavni	10	(1)
2020–	Olimpiya Savyntsi	11	(6)
- * Club domestic league appearances and goals as of 14:55, 23 January 2021 (UTC)

Roman Kunyev (Ukrainian: Роман Петрович Кунєв; born September 20, 1990, in Kremenchuk, Poltava Oblast, Ukrainian SSR) is a Ukrainian defender who plays for FC Olimpiya Savyntsi.

== Career ==
Kunyev is the product of the Youth Sportive School FC Kremin Kremenchuk, but in January 2009 he signed a contract with FC Vorskla Poltava.

Sklyar's professional career continued, when he was promoted on loan again to FC Kremin Kremenchuk and in July 2012 signed a one-year contract. Half a year later, in January 2013 he again signed a contract with FC Vorskla.
