= Stanislav Mykytsey =

Ukrainian footballer (born 1989)

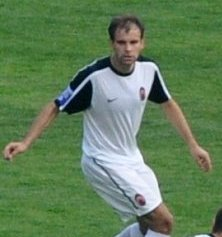

Personal information
- Full name: Stanislav Ihorovych Mykytsey
- Date of birth: 7 September 1989 (age 37)
- Place of birth: Donetsk, Ukrainian SSR
- Height: 1.82 m (5 ft 11 1/2 in)
- Position: Right back

Team information
- Current team: Stal Sanok

Youth career
- 2002–2005: Shakhtar Donetsk

Senior career*
Years	Team	Apps	(Gls)
2005–2012	Shakhtar Donetsk	1	(0)
2005–2008	→ Shakhtar-3 Donetsk	33	(1)
2009–2010	→ Illichivets Mariupol (loan)	27	(0)
2010–2011	→ Zorya Luhansk (loan)	13	(0)
2012–2019	Oleksandriya	112	(7)
2019	Jelgava	14	(1)
2020–2021	Chornomorets Odesa	28	(1)
2021–2022	Mariupol	7	(0)
2022	Polonia Przemyśl	14	(1)
2022–2024	Cosmos Nowotaniec	59	(15)
2024–2025	JKS Jarosław	31	(6)
2025–2026	Cosmos Nowotaniec	27	(4)
2026–	Stal Sanok	0	(0)

International career
2005	Ukraine U17	8	(0)
2007–2008	Ukraine U19	15	(0)
2008–2009	Ukraine U21	2	(0)
- * Club domestic league appearances and goals as of 14:49, 23 June 2025 (UTC)

Stanislav Mykytsey (Ukrainian: Станіслав Ігорович Микицей, born 7 September 1989) is a Ukrainian professional footballer who plays as a defender for Polish IV liga Subcarpathia club Stal Sanok.

== Career ==
Mykytsey is a product of FC Shakhtar Donetsk sportive school. He became on loan for FC Zorya Luhansk in Ukrainian Premier League from Summer 2010.

In January 2017, it was announced he was being investigated in a doping case. In March 2017, he was disqualified for one and a half of year.

== Career statistics ==
As of 14 March 2017

Appearances and goals by club, season and competition
Club	Season	League			Ukrainian Cup		Europe		Other		Total	
Club	Season	Division	Apps	Goals	Apps	Goals	Apps	Goals	Apps	Goals	Apps	Goals
Shakhtar-3 Donetsk	2005–06	Ukrainian Second League	16	0	0	0	—		—		16	0
Shakhtar-3 Donetsk	2006–07	Ukrainian Second League	15	1	0	0	—		—		15	1
Shakhtar-3 Donetsk	2007–08	Ukrainian Second League	2	0	0	0	—		—		2	0
Shakhtar-3 Donetsk	Total		33	1	0	0	—		—		33	1
Shakhtar Donetsk	2006–07	Ukrainian Premier League	1	0	0	0	0	0	0	0	1	0
Shakhtar Donetsk	2007–08	Ukrainian Premier League	0	0	0	0	0	0	0	0	0	0
Shakhtar Donetsk	2008–09	Ukrainian Premier League	0	0	0	0	0	0	0	0	0	0
Shakhtar Donetsk	2011–12	Ukrainian Premier League	0	0	0	0	0	0	0	0	0	0
Shakhtar Donetsk	Total		1	0	0	0	0	0	0	0	1	0
Illichivets (loan)	2009–10	Ukrainian Premier League	24	0	1	0	—		0	0	25	0
Illichivets (loan)	2010–11	Ukrainian Premier League	3	0	0	0	—		0	0	3	0
Illichivets (loan)	Total		27	0	1	0	—		0	0	28	0
Zorya Luhansk (loan)	2010–11	Ukrainian Premier League	13	0	0	0	—		0	0	13	0
Oleksandriya	2012–13	Ukrainian First League	12	1	0	0	—		0	0	12	1
Oleksandriya	2013–14	Ukrainian First League	28	1	1	0	—		0	0	29	1
Oleksandriya	2014–15	Ukrainian First League	14	0	2	0	—		0	0	16	0
Oleksandriya	2015–16	Ukrainian Premier League	16	2	5	0	—		0	0	21	2
Oleksandriya	2016–17	Ukrainian Premier League	12	3	0	0	2 (Note: Appearances in UEFA Europa League)	0	0	0	14	3
Oleksandriya	Total		82	7	8	0	2	0	0	0	92	7
Career total			156	8	9	0	2	0	0	0	167	8

== Honours ==
Cosmos Nowotaniec

- IV liga Subcarpathia: 2022–23
- Polish Cup (Krosno regionals): 2022–23
