= Dmytro Leonov =

Ukrainian footballer

Personal information
- Full name: Dmytro Valeriyovych Leonov
- Date of birth: 6 November 1988 (age 38)
- Place of birth: Yevpatoria, Ukrainian SSR
- Height: 1.66 m (5 ft 5 1/2 in)
- Position: Midfielder

Team information
- Current team: Oleksandriya (assistant manager)

Youth career
- 2001–2005: UOR Simferopol

Senior career*
Years	Team	Apps	(Gls)
2006	Yalos Yalta	14	(1)
2006–2007	Krymteplytsia Molodizhne	28	(3)
2007–2008	Khimik Krasnoperekopsk	31	(4)
2008–2009	Dnister Ovidiopol	20	(0)
2009	Yednist' Plysky	10	(0)
2010	Mykolaiv	5	(0)
2010	Feniks-Illichovets Kalinine	16	(5)
2011–2013	Arsenal Bila Tserkva	58	(20)
2013–2014	Stal Alchevsk	38	(7)
2014–2017	Oleksandriya	52	(3)
2017–2018	Kolos Kovalivka	20	(1)
2018	Chornomorets Odesa	11	(0)
2020–2021	Krymteplytsia Molodizhne	7	(0)

International career^{‡}
2006	Ukraine-18	1	(0)
2006–2007	Ukraine-19	4	(1)
2011	Ukraine (students)		

Managerial career
- 2021–2024: Oleksandriya (U19 assistant)
- 2024: Oleksandriya-2 (assistant)
- 2025–2026: Oleksandriya-2 (assistant)
- 2026–: Oleksandriya (assistant)
- * Club domestic league appearances and goals as of 27 February 2019 ‡ National team caps and goals as of 27 February 2019

Dmytro Valeriyovych Leonov (Ukrainian: Дмитро Валерійович Леонов; born 6 November 1988) is a Ukrainian former professional footballer who played as a midfielder and current assistant manager at Oleksandriya.

Leonov is the product of the UOR Simferopol School System. He spent all his career as a player in different clubs of the Ukrainian First League and the Ukrainian Second League.
