= Dmytro Shapoval =

Ukrainian footballer

Personal information
- Full name: Dmytro Bohdanovych Shapoval
- Date of birth: 17 June 1996 (age 30)
- Place of birth: Ukraine
- Height: 1.89 m (6 ft 2 1/2 in)
- Position: Striker

Team information
- Current team: Vorskla Poltava
- Number: 22

Youth career
- 2011–2013: Horpynko Youth Sportive School Poltava

Senior career*
Years	Team	Apps	(Gls)
2013–2014	Karlivka	10	(0)
2015–	Vorskla Poltava	1	(0)
- * Club domestic league appearances and goals as of 10 December 2016

Dmytro Shapoval (Ukrainian: Дмитро Богданович Шаповал; born 17 June 1996) is a professional Ukrainian football striker who played for FC Vorskla Poltava in the Ukrainian Premier League.

== Career ==
Shapoval is a product of Horpynko Poltava youth sportive system.

He spent his career in FC Karlivka in the Ukrainian Second League and in the Ukrainian Premier League Reserves club FC Vorskla Poltava. And in summer 2016 Shapoval was promoted to the main-squad team of the FC Vorskla in the Ukrainian Premier League. He made his debut for Vorskla Poltava in the Ukrainian Premier League in a match against FC Volyn Lutsk on 10 December 2016.
