= Bohdan Shust =

Ukrainian footballer (born 1986)

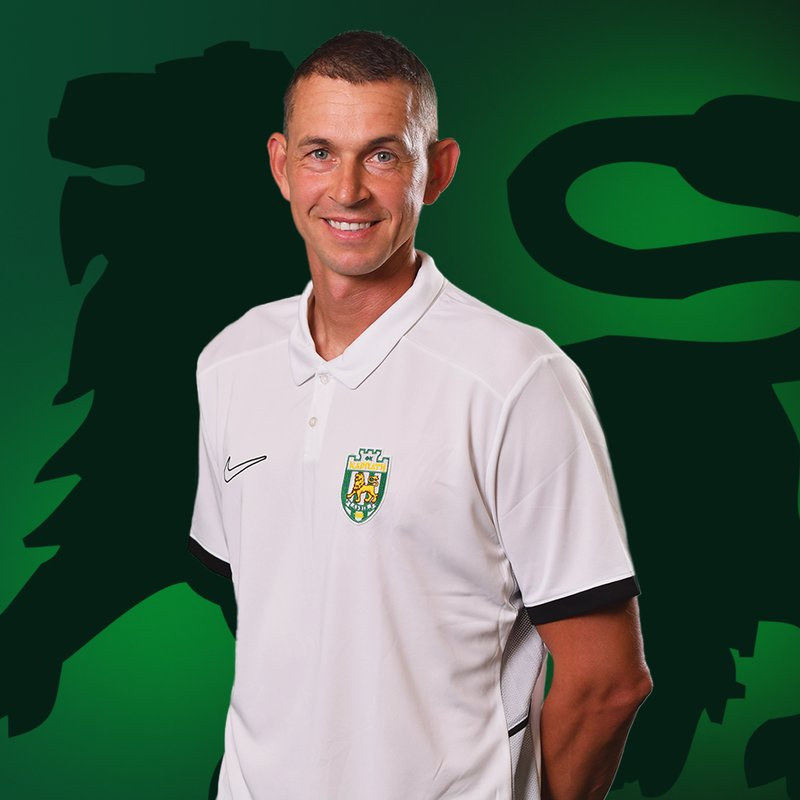

Personal information
- Full name: Bohdan Romanovych Shust
- Date of birth: 4 March 1986 (age 40)
- Place of birth: Sudova Vyshnia, Soviet Union (now Ukraine)
- Height: 1.89 m (6 ft 2 in)
- Position: Goalkeeper

Team information
- Current team: Inhulets Petrove (goalkeeping coach)

Youth career
- 2000–2003: Karpaty Lviv

Senior career*
| Years | Team | Apps | (Gls) |
| 2003–2005 | Karpaty Lviv | 19 | (0) |
| 2003–2004 | → Halychyna-Karpaty Lviv | 14 | (0) |
| 2004 | → Karpaty-2 Lviv | 4 | (0) |
| 2005–2012 | Shakhtar Donetsk | 29 | (0) |
| 2009 | → Metalurh Donetsk (loan) | 5 | (0) |
| 2010–2011 | → Zorya Luhansk (loan) | 14 | (0) |
| 2011–2012 | → Illichivets Mariupol (loan) | 21 | (0) |
| 2013–2015 | Metalist Kharkiv | 10 | (0) |
| 2015–2016 | Volyn Lutsk | 30 | (0) |
| 2016–2019 | Vorskla Poltava | 58 | (0) |
| 2019–2022 | Inhulets Petrove | 42 | (0) |
| Total | | 246 | (0) |

International career
| 2003–2004 | Ukraine U18 | 5 | (0) |
| 2004–2005 | Ukraine U19 | 7 | (0) |
| 2004–2008 | Ukraine U21 | 9 | (0) |
| 2006–2007 | Ukraine | 4 | (0) |

Managerial career
- 2022–: Inhulets Petrove (goalkeeping coach)
Medal record
Men's football
Representing Ukraine
UEFA European Under-19 Championship
| Bronze medal – third place | 2004 Switzerland |
- * Club domestic league appearances and goals

Bohdan Romanovych Shust (Ukrainian: Богдан Романович Шуст; born 4 March 1986) is a professional Ukrainian retired footballer.

== Club career ==
=== Karpaty Lviv ===
Shust started his professional career in Karpaty Lviv in 2004. By the end of his time there, he had played 19 league matches for the club.

=== Shakhtar Donetsk ===
Halfway through the 2004–05 season Shust transferred to Ukrainian giants Shakhtar Donetsk. Following the 2007–08 season, he only made five appearances and conceded six goals. In the 2008–09 season he only played one game for the team as a second-half substitute.

=== Metalurh Donetsk ===
In the summer of 2009 Shust transferred on a loan deal to Metalurh Donetsk.

== International career ==
He was a part of Ukraine's 2006 World Cup Squad as well as a member of the Ukraine national under-21 football team.

== Honours ==
Shakhtar Donetsk

- Ukrainian Premier League: 2004–05, 2005–06, 2007–08
- Ukrainian Cup: 2007–08
- Ukrainian Super Cup: 2008
- UEFA Cup: 2008–09

== See also ==
- 2005 FIFA World Youth Championship squads § Ukraine
