= Oleksiy Dytyatyev =

Ukrainian football defender

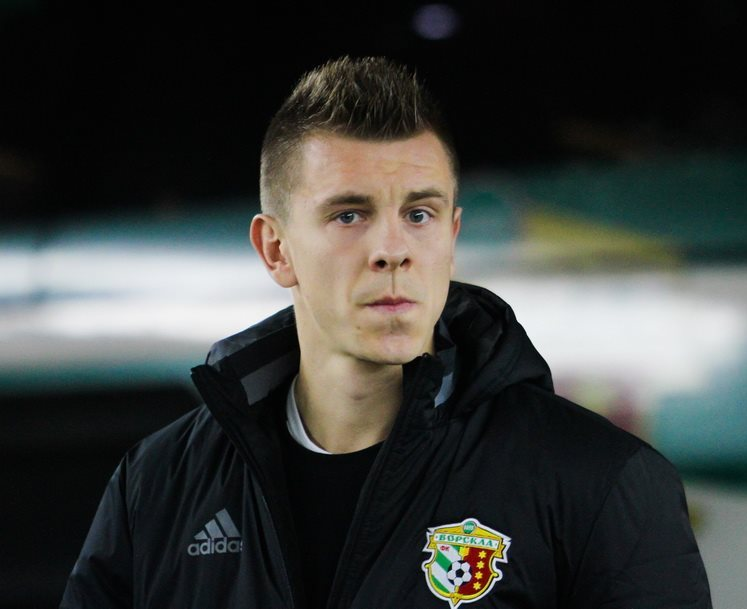

Personal information
- Full name: Oleksiy Oleksiyovych Dytyatyev
- Date of birth: 7 November 1988 (age 38)
- Place of birth: Nova Kakhovka, Ukrainian SSR
- Height: 1.96 m (6 ft 5 in)
- Position: Centre-back

Team information
- Current team: FC Rukh Lviv (coach analytic)

Youth career
- 2004–2005: Enerhiya Nova Kakhovka

Senior career*
| Years | Team | Apps | (Gls) |
| 2010–2012 | Enerhiya Nova Kakhovka | 52 | (9) |
| 2012–2013 | Krymteplytsia Molodizhne | 27 | (1) |
| 2013 | Bukovyna Chernivtsi | 3 | (0) |
| 2013–2015 | Olimpik Donetsk | 43 | (3) |
| 2015–2016 | Vorskla Poltava | 36 | (4) |
| 2017 | Karpaty Lviv | 13 | (0) |
| 2017–2021 | Cracovia | 75 | (3) |
| 2019–2022 | Cracovia II | 7 | (0) |
| 2021 | → Puszcza Niepołomice (loan) | 12 | (0) |
| 2022 | Aksu | 3 | (0) |
| 2023 | Lviv | 9 | (0) |
| 2023–2024 | Shturm Ivankiv | 16 | (3) |
| 2024 | Kolos-2 Kovalivka | 6 | (0) |
| Total | | 302 | (23) |

Managerial career
- 2026–: Rukh Lviv (assistant)
- * Club domestic league appearances and goals

Oleksiy Oleksiyovych Dytyatyev (Ukrainian: Олексій Олексійович Дитятьєв; born 7 November 1988) is a Ukrainian former professional footballer who played as a defender.

== Career ==
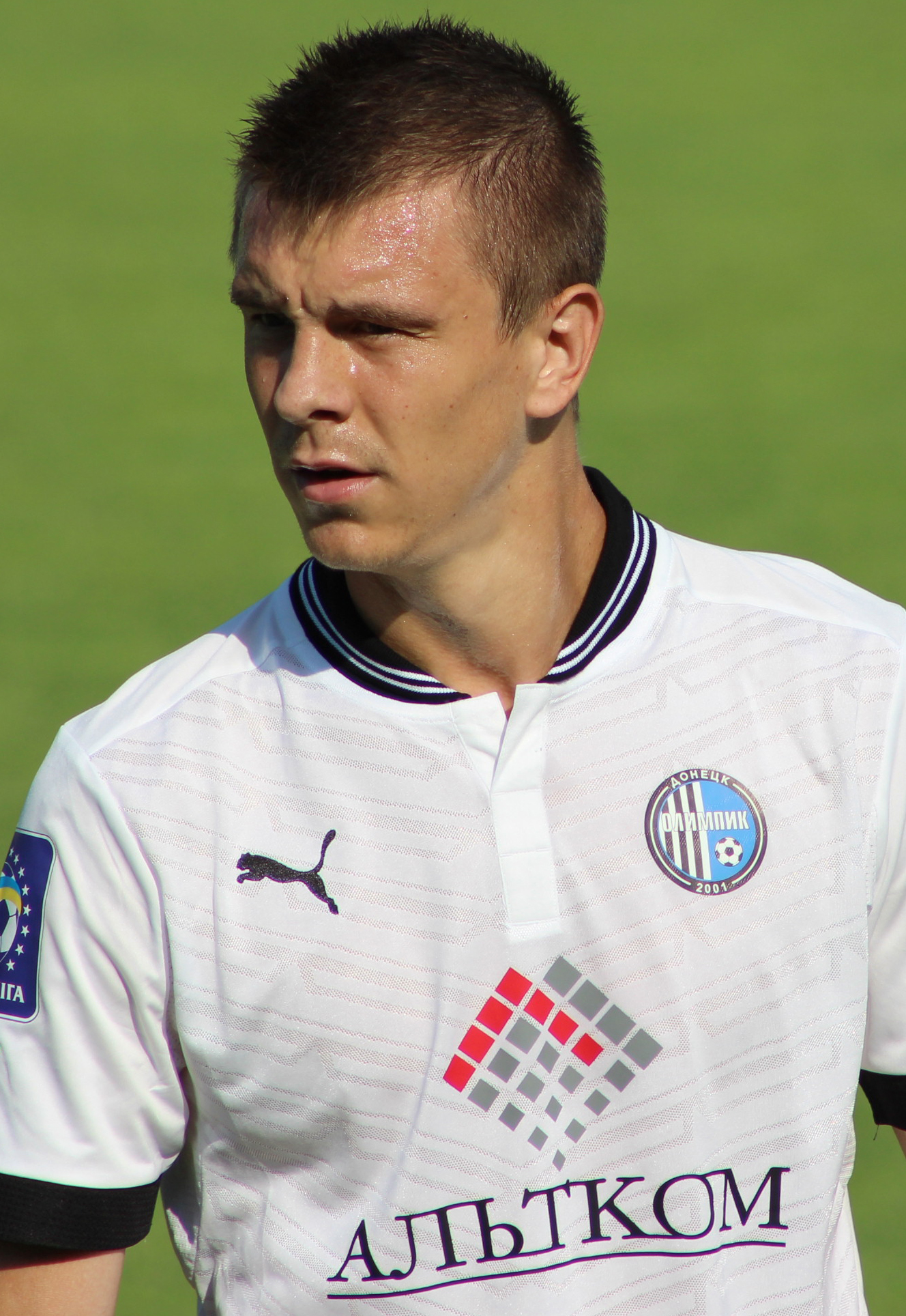
Playing for Olimpik Donetsk

Dytyatyev is a product of the Enerhiya Nova Kakhovka's youth sportive school and spent time playing for different Ukrainian First League teams. In 2013, he signed a contract with Olimpik Donetsk.

On 14 July 2017, he signed a contract with Polish side Cracovia.

== Personal life ==
He is married with one daughter Anna, born in 2013.

== Honours ==
Cracovia

- Polish Cup: 2019–20

Cracovia II

- IV liga Lesser Poland West: 2019–20
