= Mykhaylo Kozak =

Ukrainian footballer

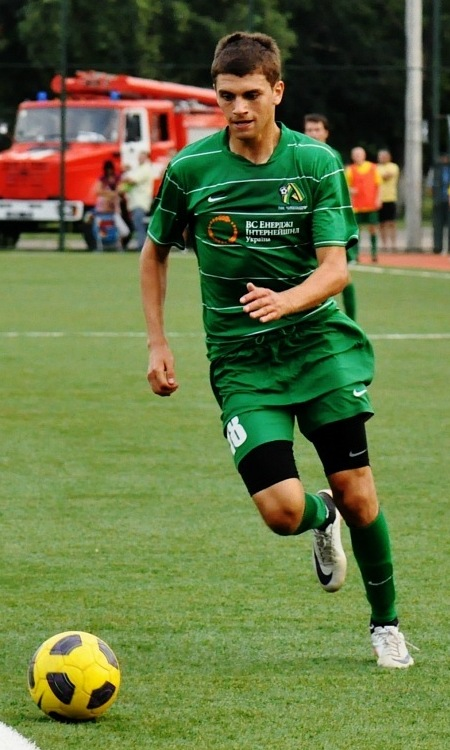

Personal information
- Full name: Mykhaylo Stepanovych Kozak
- Date of birth: 20 January 1991 (age 35)
- Place of birth: Milovice, Czechoslovakia
- Height: 1.80 m (5 ft 11 in)
- Position: Midfielder

Youth career
- 2004–2007: Karpaty Lviv
- 2008: FC Vodokanal Lviv

Senior career*
Years	Team	Apps	(Gls)
2008–2010	Lviv	53	(4)
2010–2011	Oleksandriya	13	(1)
2012	Vorskla Poltava	0	(0)
2012	→ Stal Alchevsk (loan)	6	(0)
2013–2015	Desna Chernihiv	38	(4)
2015–2017	Oleksandriya	42	(0)
2018	Rukh Vynnyky	24	(4)
2018–2019	Desna Chernihiv	4	(0)
2019	Shevardeni-1906 Tbilisi	13	(3)
2020–2021	Karpaty Halych	22	(5)

International career^{‡}
2009	Ukraine-17	1	(0)
2009	Ukraine-18	7	(0)
2010	Ukraine-19	3	(0)
2011	Ukraine (students)		
- * Club domestic league appearances and goals as of 11 September 2020 ‡ National team caps and goals as of 9 February 2019

Mykhaylo Stepanovych Kozak (Ukrainian: Михайло Степанович Козак; born 20 January 1991) is a professional Ukrainian football midfielder who plays for Karpaty Halych.

== Honours ==
Stal Alchevsk

- Ukrainian First League: Runner Up 2012–13

Oleksandriya

- Ukrainian First League: 2010–11
