= Volodymyr Odaryuk =

Ukrainian footballer

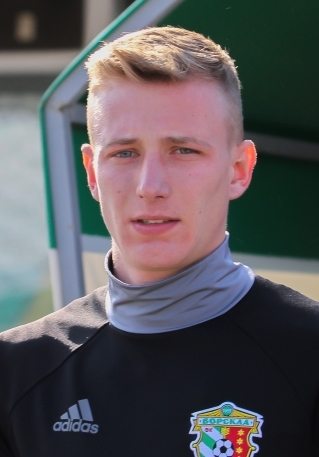

Personal information
- Full name: Volodymyr Serhiyovych Odaryuk
- Date of birth: 13 February 1994 (age 32)
- Place of birth: Poltava, Ukraine
- Height: 1.83 m (6 ft 0 in)
- Position: Striker

Team information
- Current team: Poltava
- Number: 8

Youth career
- 2008–2011: Vorskla Poltava

Senior career*
Years	Team	Apps	(Gls)
2012–2020	Vorskla Poltava	48	(3)
2019	→ Hirnyk-Sport Horishni Plavni (loan)	29	(0)
2020–2021	Mykolaiv	28	(7)
2021–2022	Oleksandriya	16	(0)
2022–2023	Inhulets Petrove	24	(3)
2023	Mynai	15	(0)
2024–	Poltava	63	(10)
- * Club domestic league appearances and goals as of 3 June 2026

Volodymyr Serhiyovych Odaryuk (Ukrainian: Володимир Сергійович Одарюк; born 13 February 1994) is a Ukrainian professional footballer who plays as a striker for Poltava.

== Career ==
Odaryuk is a product of FC Vorskla Poltava youth system where he played in the Ukrainian Premier League Reserves club FC Vorskla Poltava.

In summer 2015 Odaryuk was promoted to the main squad in the Ukrainian Premier League. He made his debut against FC Karpaty Lviv on 18 October 2015.

On 2 July 2022 he moved to Inhulets Petrove.
