= 2020–21 FC Dynamo Kyiv season =

FC Dynamo Kyiv
2020–21 season
- Owner: Ihor Surkis
- President: Ihor Surkis
- Head coach: Mircea Lucescu
- Stadium: Olimpiyskiy National Sports Complex
- Ukrainian Premier League: 1st (champions)
- Ukrainian Cup: Winners
- Ukrainian Super Cup: Winners
- UEFA Champions League: Group stage
- UEFA Europa League: Round of 16
- Top goalscorer: League: Viktor Tsyhankov (12); All: Viktor Tsyhankov (15)
- Highest home attendance: 14,850 (vs Juventus, 20 October 2020)
- Lowest home attendance: 0
- Average home league attendance: 342
Home colours	Away colours	Third colours

The 2020–21 FC Dynamo Kyiv season was the club's 94th season in existence and the club's 30th consecutive season in the top flight of Ukrainian football. In addition to the domestic league, Dynamo Kyiv participated in this season's editions of the Ukrainian Cup, the Ukrainian Super Cup, the UEFA Champions League and the UEFA Europa League. The season covers the period from August 2020 to 30 June 2021.

== Players ==
=== Squad information ===
As of 30 June 2021

Squad no.	Name	Nationality	Position	Date of birth (age)
Goalkeepers
1	Heorhiy Bushchan	(Ukraine)	GK	31 May 1994 (aged 27)
35	Ruslan Neshcheret ^{List B}	(Ukraine)	GK	22 January 2002 (aged 19)
71	Denys Boyko	(Ukraine)	GK	29 January 1988 (aged 33)
Defenders
4	Denys Popov ^{List B}	(Ukraine)	DF	17 February 1999 (aged 22)
16	Vitalii Mykolenko ^{List B}	(Ukraine)	DF	29 May 1999 (aged 22)
21	Volodymyr Kostevych	(Ukraine)	DF	23 October 1992 (aged 28)
24	Oleksandr Tymchyk	(Ukraine)	DF	20 January 1997 (aged 24)
25	Illya Zabarnyi ^{List B}	(Ukraine)	DF	1 September 2002 (aged 18)
26	Mykyta Burda	(Ukraine)	DF	24 March 1995 (aged 26)
34	Oleksandr Syrota ^{List B}	(Ukraine)	DF	11 June 2000 (aged 21)
47	Roman Vantukh	(Ukraine)	DF	29 May 1998 (aged 23)
94	Tomasz Kędziora	(Poland)	DF	11 June 1994 (aged 27)
Midfielders
5	Serhiy Sydorchuk (Captain)	(Ukraine)	MF	2 May 1991 (aged 30)
6	Tudor Băluță (on loan from Brighton & Hove Albion)	(Romania)	MF	27 March 1999 (aged 22)
7	Benjamin Verbič	(Slovenia)	MF	27 November 1993 (aged 27)
8	Volodymyr Shepelyev	(Ukraine)	MF	1 June 1997 (aged 24)
14	Carlos de Pena	(Uruguay) (Italy)	MF	11 March 1992 (aged 29)
15	Viktor Tsyhankov	(Ukraine)	MF	15 November 1997 (aged 23)
17	Bohdan Lyednyev	(Ukraine)	MF	7 April 1998 (aged 23)
18	Oleksandr Andriyevskyi	(Ukraine)	MF	24 June 1994 (aged 27)
19	Denys Harmash	(Ukraine)	MF	19 April 1990 (aged 31)
20	Oleksandr Karavayev	(Ukraine)	MF	2 June 1992 (aged 29)
22	Gerson Rodrigues	(Luxembourg)	MF	20 June 1995 (aged 26)
23	Sidcley	(Brazil)	MF	13 May 1993 (aged 28)
29	Vitaliy Buyalskyi	(Ukraine)	MF	6 January 1993 (aged 28)
99	Mikkel Duelund	(Denmark)	MF	29 June 1997 (aged 24)
Forwards
10	Mykola Shaparenko	(Ukraine)	FW	4 October 1998 (aged 22)
27	Clayton	(Brazil)	FW	23 October 1995 (aged 25)
30	Vladyslav Vanat ^{List B}	(Ukraine)	FW	4 January 2002 (aged 19)
41	Artem Besyedin	(Ukraine)	FW	31 March 1996 (aged 25)
89	Vladyslav Supriaha ^{List B}	(Ukraine)	FW	15 February 2000 (aged 21)

== Transfers ==
=== In ===
Date	Pos.	Player	Age	Moving from	Type	Fee	Source
Summer
15 August 2020	MF	(Ukraine) Yuriy Tlumak	18	(Ukraine) Karpaty Lviv	Transfer	Free	
20 August 2020	FW	(Ukraine) Artem Kravets	31	(Turkey) Kayserispor	Transfer	Free	
6 October 2020	DF	(Ukraine) Volodymyr Kostevych	27	(Poland) Lech Poznań	Transfer	Undisclosed	
6 October 2020	FW	(Brazil) Clayton	24	(Brazil) Atlético Mineiro	Transfer	Free	
31 July 2020	DF	(Ukraine) Akhmed Alibekov	22	(Czech Republic) Slovan Liberec	Loan return		
31 July 2020	DF	(Ukraine) Alan Aussi	19	(Czech Republic) Slovan Liberec	Loan return		
31 July 2020	DF	(Ukraine) Mykyta Kravchenko	23	(Ukraine) Olimpik Donetsk	Loan return		
31 July 2020	DF	(Ukraine) Oleksandr Tymchyk	23	(Ukraine) Zorya Luhansk	Loan return		
31 July 2020	DF	(Ukraine) Roman Vantukh	22	(Ukraine) FC Oleksandriya	Loan return		
31 July 2020	MF	(Belarus) Nikita Korzun	25	(Portugal) Vilafranquense	Loan return		
31 July 2020	MF	(Ukraine) Bohdan Lyednyev	22	(Ukraine) Zorya Luhansk	Loan return		
31 July 2020	MF	(Ukraine) Denys Yanakov	21	(Ukraine) Chornomorets Odesa	Loan return		
31 July 2020	FW	(Luxembourg) Gerson Rodrigues	25	(Turkey) Ankaragücü	Loan return		
31 July 2020	FW	(Ukraine) Vladyslav Supriaha	20	(Ukraine) SC Dnipro-1	Loan return		
3 August 2020	MF	(Ukraine) Denys Harmash	30	(Turkey) Çaykur Rizespor	Loan return		
14 August 2020	MF	(Ukraine) Yuriy Shpyrka	22	(Ukraine) Prykarpattia Ivano-Frankivsk	Loan return		
22 August 2020	MF	(Ukraine) Oleksandr Osman	24	(Ukraine) Metalist 1925 Kharkiv	Loan return		
6 October 2020	MF	(Romania) Tudor Băluță	21	(England) Brighton	Loan		
Winter
31 December 2020	DF	(Brazil) Sidcley	27	(Brazil) Corinthians	Loan return		
31 December 2020	MF	(Ghana) Mohammed Kadiri	24	(Russia) Arsenal Tula	Loan return		
31 December 2020	MF	(Ukraine) Ivan Kalyuzhnyi	22	(Ukraine) Rukh Lviv	Loan return		

=== Out ===
Date	Pos.	Player	Age	Moving to	Type	Fee	Source
Summer
5 August 2020	MF	(Ukraine) Denys Yanakov	21	(Ukraine) Zorya Luhansk	Transfer	Undisclosed	
2 September 2020	MF	(Belarus) Nikita Korzun	25	(Belarus) Shakhtyor Soligorsk	Transfer	Undisclosed	
2 September 2020	MF	(Ukraine) Oleksandr Osman	24	(Ukraine) Obolon Kyiv	Transfer	Undisclosed	
18 September 2020	MF	(Ukraine) Yuriy Shpyrka	22	(Ukraine) Prykarpattia Ivano-Frankivsk	Transfer	Undisclosed	
22 September 2020	FW	(Ukraine) Artem Kravets	31	(Turkey) Konyaspor	Transfer	Free	
2 October 2020	DF	(Croatia) Josip Pivarić	31	(Croatia) Lokomotiva	Transfer	Free	
1 August 2020	DF	(Ukraine) Vladyslav Dubinchak	22	(Ukraine) SC Dnipro-1	Loan		
4 August 2020	DF	(Ukraine) Mykyta Kravchenko	23	(Ukraine) Kolos Kovalivka	Loan		
29 August 2020	MF	(Nigeria) Olabiran Muyiwa	21	(Ukraine) Olimpik Donetsk	Loan		
29 August 2020	FW	(Belgium) Ibrahim Kargbo Jr.	20	(Ukraine) Olimpik Donetsk	Loan		
1 September 2020	GK	(Ukraine) Vladyslav Kucheruk	21	(Ukraine) Kolos Kovalivka	Loan		
1 September 2020	FW	(Ukraine) Yevhen Isayenko	20	(Ukraine) Kolos Kovalivka	Loan		
4 September 2020	DF	(Ukraine) Alan Aussi	19	(Belarus) Torpedo-BelAZ Zhodino	Loan		
16 September 2020	MF	(Ghana) Mohammed Kadiri	24	(Russia) Arsenal Tula	Loan		
24 September 2020	DF	(Ukraine) Akhmed Alibekov	22	(Russia) FC Ufa	Loan		
2 October 2020	FW	(Spain) Fran Sol	28	(Spain) Tenerife	Loan		
Winter
12 February 2021	MF	(Ukraine) Ivan Kalyuzhnyi	23	(Ukraine) FC Oleksandriya	Transfer	Undisclosed	
1 January 2021	FW	(Ukraine) Heorhiy Tsitaishvili	20	(Ukraine) Vorskla Poltava	Loan		
25 January 2021	DF	(Ukraine) Bohdan Biloshevskyi	21	(Ukraine) Desna Chernihiv	Loan		
5 February 2021	MF	(Ukraine) Roman Bodnya	19	(Ukraine) Chornomorets Odesa	Loan		
5 February 2021	MF	(Ukraine) Vadym Mashchenko	20	(Ukraine) Chornomorets Odesa	Loan		
5 February 2021	MF	(Ukraine) Artur Vashchyshyn	20	(Ukraine) Chornomorets Odesa	Loan		
5 February 2021	FW	(Ukraine) Danyil Sukhoruchko	20	(Ukraine) Chornomorets Odesa	Loan		
17 February 2021	DF	(Ukraine) Artem Shabanov	28	(Poland) Legia Warsaw	Loan		
23 February 2021	FW	(Ukraine) Nazariy Rusyn	22	(Poland) Legia Warsaw	Loan		

== Pre-season and friendlies ==
Win Draw Loss

7 August 2020 Friendly	Dynamo Kyiv (Ukraine)	3–0	(Ukraine) Veres Rivne	Kyiv
18:00 EEST (UTC+03:00)	Duelund 6'; Supriaha 16' de Pena 52'	Report		Stadium: Dynamo Training Center

11 August 2020 Friendly	Dynamo Kyiv (Ukraine)	1–2	(Ukraine) Desna Chernihiv	Kyiv
18:00 EEST (UTC+03:00)	Tsyhankov 80'	Report	Filippov 32'; Shevtsov 82'	Stadium: Dynamo Training Center

15 August 2020 Friendly	Dynamo Kyiv (Ukraine)	5–1	(Ukraine) Polissya Zhytomyr	Kyiv
17:00 EEST (UTC+03:00)	Supriaha 12', 37'; Buyalskyi 24'; Shaparenko 45'; Duelund 78'	Report	Halenko 52'	Stadium: Dynamo Stadium

5 September 2020 Friendly	Kolos Kovalivka (Ukraine)	0–1	(Ukraine) Dynamo Kyiv	Kovalivka
17:30 EEST (UTC+03:00)		Report	Kravets 49'	Stadium: Kolos Stadium

18 January 2021 Friendly	Dynamo Kyiv (Ukraine)	0–2	(Poland) Legia Warsaw	United Arab Emirates
15:00 EET (UTC+02:00)		Report	Pekhart 29', 33' (pen.)

21 January 2021 Friendly	Dynamo Kyiv (Ukraine)	2–0	(Belarus) Shakhtyor Soligorsk	United Arab Emirates
15:00 EET (UTC+02:00)	Clayton 51'; Tsyhankov 78'	Report

22 January 2021 Friendly	Dynamo Kyiv (Ukraine)	Cancelled	(United Arab Emirates) Ajman Club	United Arab Emirates
EET (UTC+02:00)		Report

24 January 2021 Friendly	Dynamo Kyiv (Ukraine)	0–0	Jordan	Dubai, United Arab Emirates
15:30 EET (UTC+02:00)		Report		Stadium: The Sevens Stadium

30 January 2021 Friendly	Dynamo Kyiv (Ukraine)	1–2	(Bulgaria) Ludogorets Razgrad	Turkey
16:00 EET (UTC+02:00)	Verdon 21' (o.g.)	Report	Cauly 39'; Josué Sá 56'

1 February 2021 Friendly	Dynamo Kyiv (Ukraine)	1–0	(Georgia (country)) Dinamo Tbilisi	Turkey
16:15 EET (UTC+02:00)	Buyalskyi 90+2' (pen.)	Report

4 February 2021 Friendly	Dynamo Kyiv (Ukraine)	2–2	(Bulgaria) CSKA 1948 Sofia	Turkey
16:00 EET (UTC+02:00)	Tsyhankov 30' de Pena 62' (pen.)	Report	Topuzov 46'; Bastunov 82'

7 February 2021 Friendly	Dynamo Kyiv (Ukraine)	1–0	(North Macedonia) Shkëndija Tetovo	Turkey
16:10 EET (UTC+02:00)	Lyednyev 85'	Report

8 February 2021 Friendly	Dynamo Kyiv (Ukraine)	5–2	(Belarus) BATE Borisov	Turkey
16:00 EET (UTC+02:00)	Tsyhankov 7' de Pena 20'; Kopitović 24' (o.g.); Duelund 85'; Rodrigues 88'	Report	Umarov 78'; Saroka 86'

23 March 2021 Friendly	Dynamo Kyiv (Ukraine)	3–0	(Romania) Dinamo București	Kyiv
17:00 EET (UTC+02:00)	Clayton 22'; Lyednyev 41'; Khondak 91'	Report		Stadium: Dynamo Stadium; Attendance: 0

== Competitions ==
=== Overview ===
Competition	First match	Last match	Starting round	Final position	Record							
Competition	First match	Last match	Starting round	Final position	Pld	W	D	L	GF	GA	GD	Win %
Ukrainian Premier League	21 August 2020	9 May 2021	Matchday 1	Winners	26	20	5	1	59	15	+44	76.92
Ukrainian Cup	3 March 2021	13 May 2021	Quarterfinal	Winners	3	2	1	0	4	0	+4	66.67
Super Cup	25 August 2020		Final	Winners	1	1	0	0	3	1	+2	100.00
Champions League	15 September 2020	8 December 2020	3Q	Group stage (3rd)	9	4	1	4	11	14	−3	44.44
Europa League	18 February 2021	18 March 2021	Round of 32	Round of 16	4	1	1	2	2	5	−3	25.00
Total					43	28	8	7	79	35	+44	65.12

Last updated: 13 May 2021
Source: Competitions

=== Ukrainian Premier League ===
==== League table ====
Pos	Team	Pld	W	D	L	GF	GA	GD	Pts	Qualification or relegation
1	Dynamo Kyiv (C)	26	20	5	1	59	15	+44	65	Qualification for the Champions League group stage
2	Shakhtar Donetsk	26	16	6	4	54	19	+35	54	Qualification for the Champions League third qualifying round
3	Zorya Luhansk	26	15	5	6	44	22	+22	50	Qualification for the Europa League play-off round
4	Kolos Kovalivka	26	10	11	5	36	26	+10	41	Qualification for the Europa Conference League third qualifying round
5	Vorskla Poltava	26	11	8	7	37	30	+7	41	Qualification for the Europa Conference League second qualifying round

Source: Ukrainian Premier League
Rules for classification: 1) Points; 2) Head-to-head points; 3) Head-to-head goal difference; 4) Head-to-head higher number of goals scored; 5) Goal difference; 6) Higher number of goals scored; 7) Draw or "Golden match" if two teams tied for title (Article 22, paragraph 3).
(C) Champions

==== Results summary ====
Overall								Home						Away					
Pld	W	D	L	GF	GA	GD	Pts	W	D	L	GF	GA	GD	W	D	L	GF	GA	GD
26	20	5	1	59	15	+44	65	8	4	1	25	8	+17	12	1	0	34	7	+27

Last updated: 9 May 2021.

==== Results by round ====
Round	1	2	3	4	5	6	7	8	9	10	11	12	13	14	15	16	17	18	19	20	21	22	23	24	25	26
Ground	A	H	H	A	H	A	H	A	H	A	H	A	H	H	A	A	H	A	H	A	H	A	H	A	H	A
Result	W	D	W	W	D	W	W	W	L	W	W	W	D	W	D	W	W	W	W	W	W	W	W	W	D	W
Position	2	2	2	1	1	1	1	1	1	1	1	1	1	1	1	1	1	1	1	1	1	1	1	1	1	1

Updated to match(es) played on 9 May 2021. Source:
A = Away; H = Home; W = Win; D = Draw; L = Loss

==== Matches ====
21 August 2020 1	Olimpik Donetsk	1–4	Dynamo Kyiv	Kyiv
17:00 EEST (UTC+03:00)	Politylo 23'; Kychak (yellow card) 57'	Report	Buyalskyi 8'; Zaviyskyi 16' (o.g.); Supriaha 56' de Pena (yellow card) 65'; Tsyhankov 87'	Stadium: Dynamo Stadium; Attendance: 0 Referee: Maksym Kozyryatskyi
Note: Match was played behind closed doors due to quarantine in Ukraine during COVID-19 pandemic.

11 September 2020 2	Dynamo Kyiv	0–0	Desna Chernihiv	Kyiv
19:00 EEST (UTC+03:00)	Zabarnyi (yellow card) 67'	Report	Kalitvintsev (yellow card) 55'; Dombrovskyi (yellow card) 64'; Hitchenko (yellow card) 74'	Stadium: NSC Olimpiyskiy; Attendance: 0 Referee: Ihor Paskhal
Note: Match was played behind closed doors due to quarantine in Ukraine during COVID-19 pandemic.

19 September 2020 3	Dynamo Kyiv	3–1	FC Lviv	Kyiv
19:30 EEST (UTC+03:00)	Tsyhankov 48' (pen.); Shaparenko (yellow card) 71', (goal) 87'; Supriaha (yellow card) 80', (goal) 90+5'	Report	Hrysyo (yellow card) 21'; Ainsalu (yellow card) 25'; Klymenchuk (yellow card) 47'; Kravchuk (yellow card) 59'; Čelić 62'; Mihoubi (yellow card) 73' (yellow-red card) 83'	Stadium: NSC Olimpiyskiy; Attendance: 0 Referee: Viktor Kopiyevskyi
Note: Match was played behind closed doors due to quarantine in Ukraine during COVID-19 pandemic.

26 September 2020 4	FC Mynai	0–4	Dynamo Kyiv	Kyiv
14:00 EEST (UTC+03:00)	Pavlish (yellow card) 6' (yellow-red card) 14'; Melichenko (yellow card) 65'; Lopyryonok (yellow card) 77'; Akhmedzade (yellow card) 85'	Report	Andriyevskyi 36'; Tsyhankov 41'; Zabarnyi (yellow card) 51'; Verbič 59'; Matić 71' (o.g.)	Stadium: NSC Olimpiyskiy; Attendance: 5 Referee: Vitaliy Romanov

4 October 2020 5	Dynamo Kyiv	1–1	Zorya Luhansk	Kyiv
17:00 EEST (UTC+03:00)	Sydorchuk (yellow card) 22'; Verbič 74'	Report	Kabayev (yellow card) 16'; Vernydub (yellow card) 20'; Kocherhin 65'	Stadium: NSC Olimpiyskiy; Attendance: 0 Referee: Kateryna Monzul
Note: Match was played behind closed doors due to quarantine in Ukraine during COVID-19 pandemic.

17 October 2020 6	Rukh Lviv	0–2	Dynamo Kyiv	Lviv
17:00 EEST (UTC+03:00)	Klymchuk (yellow card) 7'; Martynyuk (yellow card) 59'	Report	de Pena 30'; Rodrigues 90'	Stadium: Arena Lviv; Attendance: 0 Referee: Ihor Paskhal
Note: Match was played behind closed doors due to quarantine in Ukraine during COVID-19 pandemic.

24 October 2020 7	Dynamo Kyiv	1–0	FC Oleksandriya	Kyiv
17:00 EEST (UTC+03:00)	Popov 1', (yellow card) 51' de Pena (yellow card) 21'; Rodrigues (yellow card) 33'; Kędziora (yellow card) 41'; Sydorchuk (yellow card) 82'; Shaparenko (red card) 89'	Report	Hrytsuk (yellow card) 48'; Stetskov (yellow card) 57'; Melnyk (yellow card) 77'; Bondarenko (yellow card) 90+3'	Stadium: NSC Olimpiyskiy; Attendance: 0 Referee: Maksym Kozyryatskyi
Note: Match was played behind closed doors due to quarantine in Ukraine during COVID-19 pandemic.

31 October 2020 8	SC Dnipro-1	1–2	Dynamo Kyiv	Kyiv
19:30 EET (UTC+02:00)	Nazarenko 22', (yellow card) 77'; Ihnatenko (yellow card) 50'; Pikhalyonok (yellow card) 90+3'	Report	Adamyuk 35' (o.g.); Tsyhankov 44'; Buyalskyi (yellow card) 55'; Kędziora (yellow card) 86'; Popov (yellow card) 90+1'	Stadium: NSC Olimpiyskiy; Attendance: 0 Referee: Dmytro Kryvushkin
Note: Match was played behind closed doors due to quarantine in Ukraine during COVID-19 pandemic.

8 November 2020 9	Dynamo Kyiv	0–3	Shakhtar Donetsk	Kyiv
17:00 EET (UTC+02:00)	Andriyevskyi (yellow card) 17'; Verbič (yellow card) 37'; Sydorchuk (red card) 45+1'	Report	Tetê (yellow card) 14'; Moraes 34'; Marlos (yellow card) 44'; Marcos Antônio (yellow card) 51', (goal) 66'; Alan Patrick 73'	Stadium: NSC Olimpiyskiy; Attendance: 0 Referee: Kateryna Monzul
Note: Match was played behind closed doors due to quarantine in Ukraine during COVID-19 pandemic.

21 November 2020 10	Inhulets Petrove	0–2	Dynamo Kyiv	Kropyvnytskyi
14:00 EET (UTC+02:00)	Semenko (yellow card) 14'; Kozak (yellow card) 38'; Balan (yellow card) 43'	Report	Harmash 15', (yellow card) 20'; Kędziora (yellow card) 52'; Zabarnyi (yellow card) 64'; Shaparenko 80'	Stadium: Zirka Stadium; Attendance: 0 Referee: Maksym Kozyryatskyi
Note: Match was played behind closed doors due to quarantine in Ukraine during COVID-19 pandemic.

28 November 2020 11	Dynamo Kyiv	2–0	Vorskla Poltava	Kyiv
17:00 EET (UTC+02:00)	Tsyhankov 13'; Verbič 36'; Zabarnyi (red card) 82'	Report	Perduta (yellow card) 3'; Chelyadin (yellow card) 72'; Sklyar (yellow card) 76'; Yavorskyi (yellow card) 87'; Kane (red card) 90'	Stadium: NSC Olimpiyskiy; Attendance: 0 Referee: Yuriy Ivanov
Note: Match was played behind closed doors due to quarantine in Ukraine during COVID-19 pandemic.

5 December 2020 12	FC Mariupol	1–2	Dynamo Kyiv	Kyiv
19:30 EET (UTC+02:00)	Sikan (yellow card) 16'; Peterman (yellow card) 50'; Myshnyov (yellow card) 50'; Dobrokhotov (yellow card) 64'; Topalov 90+4'	Report	Harmash 6'; Neshcheret (red card) 39'; Tsyhankov 77'	Stadium: Dynamo Stadium; Attendance: 0 Referee: Andriy Kovalenko
Note: Match was played behind closed doors due to quarantine in Ukraine during COVID-19 pandemic.

12 December 2020 13	Dynamo Kyiv	2–2	Kolos Kovalivka	Kyiv
17:00 EET (UTC+02:00)	Mykolenko (yellow card) 48'; Shepelyev (red card) 53'; Shaparenko (yellow card) 62'; Tsyhankov 74' (pen.), 84'; Boyko (yellow card) 90+3'	Report	Kostyshyn (yellow card) 27'; Seleznyov (yellow card) 31', (goal) 48' (pen.); Ilyin (yellow card) 50'; Chornomorets (yellow card) 67'; Milko (yellow card) 68'; Maksymenko (red card) 73'; Antyukh 88'; Volynets (yellow card) 89'	Stadium: Dynamo Stadium; Attendance: 0 Referee: Ihor Paskhal
Note: Match was played behind closed doors due to quarantine in Ukraine during COVID-19 pandemic.

13 February 2021 14	Dynamo Kyiv	3–1	Olimpik Donetsk	Kyiv
17:00 EET (UTC+02:00)	Besyedin (yellow card) 14', (goal) 30', 90' de Pena (yellow card) 45'; Buyalskyi 77'; Popov (yellow card) 90+3'	Report	Nkeng (yellow card) 9' (yellow-red card) 76'; Alvarenga 20'; Khamelyuk (yellow card) 45+1'; Lebedenko (red card) 89'	Stadium: Dynamo Stadium; Attendance: 0 Referee: Maksym Kozyryatskyi
Note: Match was played behind closed doors due to quarantine in Ukraine during COVID-19 pandemic.

21 February 2021 15	Desna Chernihiv	1–1	Dynamo Kyiv	Kyiv
19:30 EET (UTC+02:00)	Yermakov (yellow card) 9'; Budkivskyi 53'; Imerekov (yellow card) 57'; Arveladze (yellow card) 69'; Bezborodko (yellow card) 84' (yellow-red card) 86'	Report	Besyedin (yellow card) 45+1'; Rodrigues (yellow card) 69'; Tsyhankov (yellow card) 80', (goal) 90+2' (pen.); Mykolenko (yellow card) 89'	Stadium: Dynamo Stadium; Attendance: 2,983; Referee: Ihor Paskhal

28 February 2021 16	FC Lviv	1–4	Dynamo Kyiv	Lviv
19:30 EET (UTC+02:00)	Mahmutovic (yellow card) 33'; Brikner (yellow card) 36'; Nych 69'	Report	Besyedin 1'; Tsyhankov 36' (pen.); Kędziora 52'; Lyednyev 90'	Stadium: Arena Lviv; Attendance: 6,973; Referee: Dmytro Kryvushkin

7 March 2021 17	Dynamo Kyiv	3–0	FC Mynai	Kyiv
14:00 EET (UTC+02:00)	Sydorchuk 52' de Pena 56'; Rodrigues 90' (pen.)	Report	Matić (yellow card) 3'; Lopyryonok (yellow card) 19'; Milevskyi (yellow card) 25'; Malepe (red card) 54'	Stadium: NSC Olimpiyskiy; Attendance: 3,238; Referee: Kateryna Monzul

14 March 2021 18	Zorya Luhansk	0–2	Dynamo Kyiv	Zaporizhia
17:00 EET (UTC+02:00)	Leovigildo (yellow card) 36'; Ivanisenya (yellow card) 72'; Abu Hanna (yellow card) 83'	Report	Buyalskyi (yellow card) 28'; Besyedin 55'; Sydorchuk 59'; Shepelyev (yellow card) 89'	Stadium: Slavutych-Arena; Attendance: 4,127; Referee: Yuriy Ivanov

21 March 2021 19	Dynamo Kyiv	3–0	Rukh Lviv	Kyiv
17:00 EET (UTC+02:00)	Sydorchuk (yellow card) 27'; Karavayev 59', 90'; Sidcley 86'	Report	Karasyuk (yellow card) 10'; Boryachuk (yellow card) 19'; Boychuk (yellow card) 54'	Stadium: NSC Olimpiyskiy; Attendance: 0 Referee: Maksym Kozyryatskyi
Note: Match was played behind closed doors due to quarantine in Ukraine during COVID-19 pandemic.

3 April 2021 20	FC Oleksandriya	1–2	Dynamo Kyiv	Oleksandriya
19:30 EEST (UTC+03:00)	Sitalo 14'; Tretyakov (yellow card) 37'	Report	Shaparenko 35' (pen.); Popov (yellow card) 55'; Kędziora (yellow card) 60'; Rodrigues (yellow card) 75', (goal) 90'	Stadium: CSC Nika Stadium; Attendance: 2,012; Referee: Dmytro Kryvushkin

10 April 2021 21	Dynamo Kyiv	2–0	SC Dnipro-1	Dnipro
17:00 EET (UTC+02:00)	Sydorchuk (yellow card) 40', (goal) 68'; Mykolenko 58'; Besyedin (yellow card) 63'; Karavayev (yellow card) 75'	Report	Dovbyk (yellow card) 24' (yellow-red card) 61'; Ćuže (yellow card) 35'; Kohut (yellow card) 44'; Di Franco (yellow card) 47'; Yarmolyuk (yellow card) 90+1'	Stadium: Dnipro-Arena; Attendance: 0 Referee: Ihor Paskhal
Note: Match was played behind closed doors due to quarantine in Ukraine during COVID-19 pandemic.

17 April 2021 22	Shakhtar Donetsk	0–1	Dynamo Kyiv	Kyiv
19:30 EET (UTC+02:00)	Matviyenko (yellow card) 25'; Bondar (yellow card) 27'; Maycon (yellow card) 41'; Kryvtsov (yellow card) 90+1'	Report	Kędziora (yellow card) 31' de Pena 34' (pen.); Buyalskyi (yellow card) 65'	Stadium: NSC Olimpiyskiy; Attendance: 0 Referee: Kateryna Monzul
Note: Match was played behind closed doors due to quarantine in Ukraine during COVID-19 pandemic.

25 April 2021 23	Dynamo Kyiv	5–0	Inhulets Petrove	Kyiv
17:00 EET (UTC+02:00)	Zabarnyi 4'; Besyedin 14'; Tsyhankov 48', 70'; Popov 82'	Report	Krynskyi (yellow card) 23'; Synyohub (yellow card) 29'; Bartulović (yellow card) 45+1'	Stadium: NSC Olimpiyskiy; Attendance: 0 Referee: Mykola Balakin
Note: Match was played behind closed doors due to quarantine in Ukraine during COVID-19 pandemic.

1 May 2021 24	Vorskla Poltava	1–5	Dynamo Kyiv	Poltava
19:30 EEST (UTC+03:00)	Kulach 24' (pen.); Sapay (yellow card) 55'; Stepanyuk (yellow card) 62'; Thill (yellow card) 71'; Kravchuk (yellow card) 87'	Report	Buyalskyi 6', 15', 32'; Kędziora (yellow card) 26'; Rodrigues 65'; Sidcley 84'	Stadium: Vorskla Stadium; Attendance: 0 Referee: Viktor Kopiyevskyi
Note: Match was played behind closed doors due to quarantine in Ukraine during COVID-19 pandemic.

5 May 2021 25	Dynamo Kyiv	0–0	FC Mariupol	Mariupol
14:00 EEST (UTC+03:00)	de Pena (yellow card) 12' (yellow-red card) 51'; Buyalskyi (yellow card) 71'	Report	Horbunov (yellow card) 20'; Tankovskyi (yellow card) 30'; Topalov (yellow card) 55'; Myshnyov (yellow card) 68'; Chekh (yellow card) 73'; Mampassi (yellow card) 80'	Stadium: Volodymyr Boiko Stadium; Attendance: 869; Referee: Andriy Kovalenko

9 May 2021 26	Kolos Kovalivka	0–3	Dynamo Kyiv	Kovalivka
14:00 EEST (UTC+03:00)	Havrysh (yellow card) 56'; Ngamba (yellow card) 66'; Zolotov (yellow card) 87'	Report	Sydorchuk (yellow card) 44'; Harmash 45'; Shaparenko 57'; Mykolenko 64'; Popov (yellow card) 87'	Stadium: Kolos Stadium; Attendance: 2,463; Referee: Oleksandr Omelchenko

=== Ukrainian Cup ===
3 March 2021 Quarter-final	Dynamo Kyiv	0–0 (4–3 p)	Kolos Kovalivka	Kyiv
17:00 EET (UTC+02:00)	de Pena (yellow card) 63'; Rodrigues (yellow card) 75'	Report	Zolotov (yellow card) 54'; Kostyshyn (yellow card) 72'; Bohdanov (yellow card) 90+2'; Chornomorets (yellow card) 100'	Stadium: NSC Olimpiyskiy; Attendance: 3,421; Referee: Denys Shurman
	Penalties
	Shaparenko (penalty scored); Supriaha (penalty scored); Rodrigues (penalty scored); Lyednyev (penalty missed); Karavayev (penalty missed); Andriyevskyi (penalty scored)		Orikhovskyi (penalty scored); Petrov (penalty scored); Milko (penalty scored); Zadoya (penalty missed); Havrysh (penalty missed); Ilyin (penalty missed)

21 April 2021 Semi-final	Ahrobiznes Volochysk	0–3	Dynamo Kyiv	Ternopil
16:00 EEST (UTC+03:00)	Hrusha (yellow card) 61'; Boychuk (yellow card) 73'	Report	Popov (yellow card) 12'; Lyednyev 45'; Syrota (yellow card) 54'; Besyedin 68'; Buyalskyi 81'	Stadium: Ternopil city stadium Attendance: 4,020; Referee: Maksym Kozyryatskyi

13 May 2021 Final	Dynamo Kyiv	1–0	Zorya Luhansk	Ternopil
19:00 EEST (UTC+03:00)	Shaparenko (yellow card) 35'; Kędziora (yellow card) 67'; Sydorchuk (yellow card) 90+3'; Tsyhankov 98'	Report	Vernydub (yellow card) 14'; Yurchenko (yellow card) 52'; Kocherhin (yellow card) 76'; Sayyadmanesh (yellow card) 90+3'; Leovigildo (yellow card) 90+4'; Ivanisenya (yellow card) 111'	Stadium: Ternopil city stadium Attendance: 3,000; Referee: Yuriy Ivanov

=== Ukrainian Super Cup ===
25 August 2020 Final	Shakhtar Donetsk	1–3	Dynamo Kyiv	Kyiv
21:00 EEST (UTC+03:00)	Moraes 37'	Report	De Pena 20'; Rodrigues 31'; Shaparenko (yellow card) 49'; Karavayev (yellow card) 59'; Fran Sol 83'	Stadium: NSC Olimpiyskiy; Attendance: 0 Referee: Vitaliy Romanov
Note: Match was played behind closed doors due to quarantine in Ukraine during COVID-19 pandemic.

=== UEFA Champions League ===
==== Qualifying phase and play-off round ====
15 September 2020 Third qualifying round	Dynamo Kyiv (Ukraine)	2–0	(Netherlands) AZ Alkmaar	Kyiv
20:00 EEST (UTC+03:00)	Buyalskyi (yellow card) 15'; Rodrigues (yellow card) 19', (goal) 49'; Kędziora (yellow card) 85'; Shaparenko 86'	Report	Stengs (yellow card) 33'; Clasie (yellow card) 83'; Idrissi (yellow card) 85'	Stadium: NSC Olimpiyskiy; Attendance: 0 Referee: Orel Grinfeld (Israel)
Note: Match was played behind closed doors due to quarantine in Ukraine during COVID-19 pandemic.

23 September 2020 Play-off round 1st leg	Gent (Belgium)	1–2	(Ukraine) Dynamo Kyiv	Ghent
22:00 EEST (UTC+03:00)	Fortuna (yellow card) 13'; Kleindienst 41'; Bezus (yellow card) 50' (yellow-red card) 53'; Odjidja-Ofoe (yellow card) 56'	Report	Supriaha 9'; Rodrigues (yellow card) 31' de Pena 79'; Shepelyev (yellow card) 87'	Stadium: Ghelamco Arena; Attendance: 0 Referee: Ovidiu Hațegan (Romania)
Note: Match was played behind closed doors.

29 September 2020 Play-off round 2nd leg	Dynamo Kyiv (Ukraine)	3–0 (5–1 agg.)	(Belgium) Gent	Kyiv
22:00 EEST (UTC+03:00)	Buyalskyi 9' de Pena 36' (pen.); Rodrigues 49' (pen.)	Report	Castro-Montes (yellow card) 29'; Plastun (yellow card) 42'; Fortuna (yellow card) 49'	Stadium: NSC Olimpiyskiy; Attendance: 0 Referee: Szymon Marciniak (Poland)
Note: Match was played behind closed doors.

==== Group stage ====
The group stage draw was held on 1 October 2020.

Pos	Team	Pld	W	D	L	GF	GA	GD	Pts	Qualification	JUV	BAR	DKV	FER
1	(Italy) Juventus	6	5	0	1	14	4	+10	15 (Note: Tied on head-to-head points (3). Head-to-head goal difference: Juventus +1, Barcelona –1.)	Advance to knockout phase	—	0–2	3–0	2–1
2	(Spain) Barcelona	6	5	0	1	16	5	+11	15	Advance to knockout phase	0–3	—	2–1	5–1
3	(Ukraine) Dynamo Kyiv	6	1	1	4	4	13	−9	4	Transfer to Europa League	0–2	0–4	—	1–0
4	(Hungary) Ferencváros	6	0	1	5	5	17	−12	1		1–4	0–3	2–2	—

Source: UEFA
Rules for classification: Group stage tiebreakers
Notes:

20 October 2020 1	Dynamo Kyiv (Ukraine)	0–2	(Italy) Juventus	Kyiv
19:55 EEST (UTC+03:00)		Report	Bentancur (yellow card) 45'; Morata 46', 84'; Cuadrado (yellow card) 50'; Demiral (yellow card) 59'	Stadium: NSC Olimpiyskiy; Attendance: 14,850; Referee: Ovidiu Hațegan (Romania)

28 October 2020 2	Ferencváros (Hungary)	2–2	(Ukraine) Dynamo Kyiv	Budapest
20:00 EET (UTC+02:00)	Somália (yellow card) 12'; Heister (yellow card) 21'; Kharatin (yellow card) 26'; Nguen 59', (yellow card) 72'; Laïdouni (yellow card) 71'; Boli 90'	Report	Tsyhankov 28' (pen.); De Pena 41'; Sydorchuk (yellow card) 52' (yellow-red card) 86'; Buyalskyi (yellow card) 76'	Stadium: Groupama Arena; Attendance: 6,171; Referee: Ivan Kružliak (Slovakia)

4 November 2020 3	Barcelona (Spain)	2–1	(Ukraine) Dynamo Kyiv	Barcelona
20:00 EET (UTC+02:00)	Messi 5' (pen.); Piqué 65'	Report	Buyalskyi (yellow card) 70'; Tsyhankov 75'	Stadium: Camp Nou; Attendance: 0 Referee: Michael Oliver (England)

24 November 2020 4	Dynamo Kyiv (Ukraine)	0–4	(Spain) Barcelona	Kyiv
20:00 EET (UTC+02:00)	Popov (yellow card) 69'	Report	Pjanić (yellow card) 16'; Dest 52'; Braithwaite 57', 70' (pen.); Griezmann 90+2'	Stadium: NSC Olimpiyskiy; Attendance: 0 Referee: Matej Jug (Slovenia)

2 December 2020 5	Juventus (Italy)	3–0	(Ukraine) Dynamo Kyiv	Turin
20:00 EET (UTC+02:00)	Bentancur (yellow card) 10'; Chiesa 21'; Ronaldo 57'; Morata 66'	Report	Zabarnyi (yellow card) 27'; Shaparenko (yellow card) 81'	Stadium: Juventus Stadium; Attendance: 0 Referee: Stéphanie Frappart (France)

8 December 2020 6	Dynamo Kyiv (Ukraine)	1–0	(Hungary) Ferencváros	Kyiv
20:00 EET (UTC+02:00)	De Pena (yellow card) 27'; Harmash (yellow card) 37'; Popov 60'	Report	Laïdouni (yellow card) 45'; Kharatin (yellow card) 47'; Blažič (yellow card) 59'; Isael (yellow card) 85'	Stadium: NSC Olimpiyskiy; Attendance: 0 Referee: Andreas Ekberg (Sweden)

=== UEFA Europa League ===
==== Knockout phase ====
===== Round of 32 =====
The round of 32 draw was held on 14 December 2020.

18 February 2021 First leg	Dynamo Kyiv (Ukraine)	1–1	(Belgium) Club Brugge	Kyiv
17:00 EET (UTC+02:00) (Note: The Dynamo Kyiv v Club Brugge match, originally scheduled at 18:55 CET (19:55 EET), was moved to 16:00 CET (17:00 EET), due to the very cold temperatures.)	Shaparenko (yellow card) 28'; Buyalskyi 62'; Mykolenko (yellow card) 90+3'	Report	Ricca (yellow card) 32'; Mechele 67'	Stadium: NSC Olimpiyskiy Stadium; Attendance: 3,284; Referee: Mattias Gestranius (Finland)

25 February 2021 Second leg	Club Brugge (Belgium)	0–1 (1–2 agg.)	(Ukraine) Dynamo Kyiv	Bruges
22:00 EET (UTC+02:00)	Van den Keybus (yellow card) 19'	Report	Besyedin (yellow card) 49'; Buyalskyi 83'	Stadium: Jan Breydel Stadium; Attendance: 0 Referee: Srđan Jovanović (Serbia)

===== Round of 16 =====
The round of 16 draw was held on 26 February 2021.

11 March 2021 First leg	Dynamo Kyiv (Ukraine)	0–2	(Spain) Villarreal	Kyiv
19:55 EET (UTC+02:00)	Sydorchuk (yellow card) 9'	Report	Pedraza (yellow card) 24'; Torres 30'; Albiol 52'; Capoue (yellow card) 65'	Stadium: NSC Olimpiyskiy Stadium; Attendance: 12,751; Referee: Michael Oliver (England)

18 March 2021 Second leg	Villarreal (Spain)	2–0 (4–0 agg.)	(Ukraine) Dynamo Kyiv	Villarreal
22:00 EET (UTC+02:00)	Gerard 13', 36'; Trigueros (yellow card) 17'; Parejo (yellow card) 43'	Report		Stadium: Estadio de la Cerámica; Attendance: 0 Referee: Andreas Ekberg (Sweden)

== Statistics ==
=== Appearances and goals ===
No.	Pos	Nat	Player	Total		Premier League		Cup		Super Cup		UEFA CL		UEFA EL	
No.	Pos	Nat	Player	Apps	Goals	Apps	Goals	Apps	Goals	Apps	Goals	Apps	Goals	Apps	Goals
Goalkeepers
1	GK	(Ukraine) UKR	Heorhiy Bushchan	35	0	22+1	0	0	0	1	0	7	0	4	0
35	GK	(Ukraine) UKR	Ruslan Neshcheret	4	0	3	0	0	0	0	0	1	0	0	0
71	GK	(Ukraine) UKR	Denys Boyko	5	0	1	0	3	0	0	0	1	0	0	0
Defenders
4	DF	(Ukraine) UKR	Denys Popov	25	3	14+1	2	2	0	0	0	4+2	1	1+1	0
16	DF	(Ukraine) UKR	Vitaliy Mykolenko	36	2	22	2	3	0	0	0	7	0	4	0
24	DF	(Ukraine) UKR	Oleksandr Tymchyk	7	0	4	0	1+1	0	1	0	0	0	0	0
25	DF	(Ukraine) UKR	Illya Zabarnyi	36	1	20+1	1	2	0	0	0	9	0	4	0
34	DF	(Ukraine) UKR	Oleksandr Syrota	16	0	10	0	2	0	1	0	0	0	3	0
94	DF	(Poland) POL	Tomasz Kędziora	40	1	23+2	1	1	0	1	0	9	0	4	0
Midfielders
5	MF	(Ukraine) UKR	Serhiy Sydorchuk	36	3	17+4	3	3	0	1	0	7	0	4	0
6	MF	(Romania) ROU	Tudor Băluță	3	0	0+1	0	0	0	0	0	0+2	0	0	0
7	MF	(Slovenia) SLO	Benjamin Verbič	21	3	6+6	3	0	0	0	0	3+6	0	0	0
8	MF	(Ukraine) UKR	Volodymyr Shepelyev	29	0	9+10	0	0+1	0	0	0	3+2	0	1+3	0
14	MF	(Uruguay) URU	Carlos de Pena	33	7	17+2	3	1+1	0	1	1	7+2	3	2	0
15	MF	(Ukraine) UKR	Viktor Tsyhankov	34	15	15+5	12	3	1	0	0	5+2	2	4	0
17	MF	(Ukraine) UKR	Bohdan Lyednyev	21	2	1+11	1	1+1	1	0+1	0	0+5	0	0+1	0
18	MF	(Ukraine) UKR	Oleksandr Andriyevskyi	24	1	9+5	1	0+1	0	0+1	0	1+4	0	1+2	0
19	MF	(Ukraine) UKR	Denys Harmash	18	3	4+8	3	0+1	0	0	0	2+3	0	0	0
20	MF	(Ukraine) UKR	Oleksandr Karavayev	37	2	16+7	2	1+2	0	1	0	6+1	0	0+3	0
22	MF	(Luxembourg) LUX	Gerson Rodrigues	38	7	9+13	4	2+1	0	1	1	5+3	2	3+1	0
23	MF	(Brazil) BRA	Sidcley	9	2	0+7	2	0+1	0	0	0	0	0	0+1	0
29	MF	(Ukraine) UKR	Vitaliy Buyalskyi	35	9	19+1	5	2+1	1	1	0	7	1	4	2
99	MF	(Denmark) DEN	Mikkel Duelund	4	0	1+3	0	0	0	0	0	0	0	0	0
Forwards
10	FW	(Ukraine) UKR	Mykola Shaparenko	39	5	19+5	4	3	0	1	0	8	1	2+1	0
27	FW	(Brazil) BRA	Clayton	1	0	0+1	0	0	0	0	0	0	0	0	0
30	FW	(Ukraine) UKR	Vladyslav Vanat	1	0	0+1	0	0	0	0	0	0	0	0	0
41	FW	(Ukraine) UKR	Artem Besyedin	18	6	12	5	3	1	0	0	0	0	3	0
89	FW	(Ukraine) UKR	Vladyslav Supriaha	31	3	10+7	2	0+2	0	1	0	6+3	1	0+2	0
Players transferred out during the season
9	FW	(Spain) ESP	Fran Sol	3	1	0+2	0	0	0	0+1	1	0	0	0	0
11	FW	(Ukraine) UKR	Heorhiy Tsitaishvili	4	0	2+2	0	0	0	0	0	0	0	0	0
13	DF	(Ukraine) UKR	Artem Shabanov	2	0	1	0	0	0	0	0	1	0	0	0
21	FW	(Ukraine) UKR	Artem Kravets	1	0	0+1	0	0	0	0	0	0	0	0	0
31	FW	(Ukraine) UKR	Nazariy Rusyn	1	0	0+1	0	0	0	0	0	0	0	0	0

Source: Competitions

Last updated: 13 May 2021

=== Goalscorers ===
Rank	No.	Pos	Nat	Name	Ukrainian Premier League	Ukrainian Cup	Ukrainian Super Cup	UEFA CL	UEFA EL	Total
1	15	MF	(Ukraine)	Viktor Tsyhankov	12	1	0	2	0	15
2	29	MF	(Ukraine)	Vitaliy Buyalskyi	5	1	0	1	2	8
3	14	MF	(Uruguay)	Carlos de Pena	3	0	1	3	0	7
3	22	MF	(Luxembourg)	Gerson Rodrigues	4	0	1	2	0	7
5	41	FW	(Ukraine)	Artem Besyedin	5	1	0	0	0	6
6	10	FW	(Ukraine)	Mykola Shaparenko	4	0	0	1	0	5
7	4	DF	(Ukraine)	Denys Popov	2	0	0	1	0	3
7	5	MF	(Ukraine)	Serhiy Sydorchuk	3	0	0	0	0	3
7	7	MF	(Slovenia)	Benjamin Verbič	3	0	0	0	0	3
7	19	MF	(Ukraine)	Denys Harmash	3	0	0	0	0	3
7	89	FW	(Ukraine)	Vladyslav Supriaha	2	0	0	1	0	3
12	16	DF	(Ukraine)	Vitalii Mykolenko	2	0	0	0	0	2
12	17	MF	(Ukraine)	Bohdan Lyednyev	1	1	0	0	0	2
12	20	MF	(Ukraine)	Oleksandr Karavayev	2	0	0	0	0	2
12	23	MF	(Brazil)	Sidcley	2	0	0	0	0	2
16	9	FW	(Spain)	Fran Sol	0	0	1	0	0	1
16	18	MF	(Ukraine)	Oleksandr Andriyevskyi	1	0	0	0	0	1
16	25	DF	(Ukraine)	Illya Zabarnyi	1	0	0	0	0	1
16	94	DF	(Poland)	Tomasz Kędziora	1	0	0	0	0	1
				Own goal	3	0	0	0	0	3
				Total	59	4	3	11	2	79

Last updated: 13 May 2021

=== Clean sheets ===
Rank	No.	Pos	Nat	Name	Premier League	Cup	Super Cup	UEFA CL	UEFA EL	Total
1	1	GK	(Ukraine)	Heorhiy Bushchan	14	0	0	3	1	18
2	71	GK	(Ukraine)	Denys Boyko	1	3	0	0	0	4
				Total	15	3	0	3	1	22

Last updated: 13 May 2021

=== Disciplinary record ===
No.	Pos	Nat	Player	Premier League			Cup			Super Cup			UEFA CL			UEFA EL			Total		
No.	Pos	Nat	Player	Booked	(yellow card) (yellow-red card)	Sent off (straight red)	Booked	(yellow card) (yellow-red card)	Sent off (straight red)	Booked	(yellow card) (yellow-red card)	Sent off (straight red)	Booked	(yellow card) (yellow-red card)	Sent off (straight red)	Booked	(yellow card) (yellow-red card)	Sent off (straight red)	Booked	(yellow card) (yellow-red card)	Sent off (straight red)
4	DF	(Ukraine)	Denys Popov	5	0	0	1	0	0	0	0	0	1	0	0	0	0	0	7	0	0
5	MF	(Ukraine)	Serhiy Sydorchuk	5	0	1	1	0	0	0	0	0	0	1	0	1	0	0	7	1	1
7	MF	(Slovenia)	Benjamin Verbič	1	0	0	0	0	0	0	0	0	0	0	0	0	0	0	1	0	0
8	MF	(Ukraine)	Volodymyr Shepelyev	1	0	1	0	0	0	0	0	0	1	0	0	0	0	0	2	0	1
10	FW	(Ukraine)	Mykola Shaparenko	2	0	1	1	0	0	1	0	0	1	0	0	1	0	0	5	0	1
14	MF	(Uruguay)	Carlos de Pena	3	1	0	1	0	0	0	0	0	1	0	0	0	0	0	5	1	0
15	MF	(Ukraine)	Viktor Tsyhankov	1	0	0	0	0	0	0	0	0	0	0	0	0	0	0	1	0	0
16	DF	(Ukraine)	Vitalii Mykolenko	2	0	0	0	0	0	0	0	0	0	0	0	1	0	0	3	0	0
18	MF	(Ukraine)	Oleksandr Andriyevskyi	1	0	0	0	0	0	0	0	0	0	0	0	0	0	0	1	0	0
19	MF	(Ukraine)	Denys Harmash	1	0	0	0	0	0	0	0	0	1	0	0	0	0	0	2	0	0
20	MF	(Ukraine)	Oleksandr Karavayev	1	0	0	0	0	0	1	0	0	0	0	0	0	0	0	2	0	0
22	MF	(Luxembourg)	Gerson Rodrigues	3	0	0	1	0	0	0	0	0	2	0	0	0	0	0	6	0	0
25	DF	(Ukraine)	Illya Zabarnyi	3	0	1	0	0	0	0	0	0	1	0	0	0	0	0	4	0	1
29	MF	(Ukraine)	Vitaliy Buyalskyi	4	0	0	0	0	0	0	0	0	3	0	0	0	0	0	7	0	0
34	DF	(Ukraine)	Oleksandr Syrota	0	0	0	1	0	0	0	0	0	0	0	0	1	0	0	1	0	0
35	GK	(Ukraine)	Ruslan Neshcheret	0	0	1	0	0	0	0	0	0	0	0	0	0	0	0	0	0	1
41	FW	(Ukraine)	Artem Besyedin	3	0	0	0	0	0	0	0	0	0	0	0	1	0	0	4	0	0
71	GK	(Ukraine)	Denys Boyko	1	0	0	0	0	0	0	0	0	0	0	0	0	0	0	1	0	0
89	FW	(Ukraine)	Vladyslav Supriaha	1	0	0	0	0	0	0	0	0	0	0	0	0	0	0	1	0	0
94	DF	(Poland)	Tomasz Kędziora	6	0	0	1	0	0	0	0	0	1	0	0	0	0	0	8	0	0
			Total	44	1	5	7	0	0	2	0	0	12	1	0	4	0	0	69	2	5

Last updated: 13 May 2021

=== Attendances ===
	Matches	Attendances	Average	High	Low
Premier League	12	4,107	342	3,238	0
Cup	1	3,421	3,421	3,421	3,421
Champions League	5	14,850	2,968	14,850	0
Europa League	2	16,035	8,017	12,751	3,284
Total	20	38,413	1,920	14,850	0

Last updated: 5 May 2021
