= 2020–21 FC Oleksandriya season =

FC Oleksandriya
2020–21 season
- President: Serhiy Kuzmenko
- Manager: Volodymyr Sharan
- Stadium: CSC Nika Stadium
- Ukrainian Premier League: 9th
- Ukrainian Cup: Semifinal
- Top goalscorer: League: Artem Sitalo (4); All: Artem Sitalo, Valeriy Bondarenko (5)
- Highest home attendance: 2,138 (vs Shakhtar Donetsk, 25 April 2021)
- Lowest home attendance: 0
- Average home league attendance: 622
Home colours	Away colours	Third colours

The 2020–21 season was 9th season in the top Ukrainian football league for FC Oleksandriya. Oleksandriya competed in Premier League and Ukrainian Cup.

== Players ==
=== Squad information ===
As of 30 June 2021

Squad no.	Name	Nationality	Position	Date of birth (age)
Goalkeepers
26	Vyacheslav Borysenko ^{List B}	(Ukraine)	GK	24 March 2002 (aged 19)
31	Oleh Bilyk	(Ukraine)	GK	11 January 1998 (aged 23)
79	Yuriy Pankiv (Captain)	(Ukraine)	GK	3 November 1984 (aged 36)
Defenders
2	Oleksandr Melnyk ^{List B}	(Ukraine)	DF	10 February 2000 (aged 21)
3	Artem Hordiyenko	(Ukraine)	DF	4 March 1991 (aged 30)
4	Vladyslav Babohlo	(Ukraine)	DF	14 November 1998 (aged 22)
5	Tymur Stetskov	(Ukraine)	DF	27 January 1998 (aged 23)
11	Denys Miroshnichenko	(Ukraine)	DF	11 October 1994 (aged 26)
13	Hlib Bukhal	(Ukraine)	DF	12 November 1995 (aged 25)
20	Pavel Pashayev	(Azerbaijan) (Ukraine)	DF	4 January 1988 (aged 33)
47	Roman Vantukh (on loan from Dynamo Kyiv)	(Ukraine)	DF	4 July 1998 (aged 22)
55	Valeriy Bondarenko (on loan from Shakhtar Donetsk)	(Ukraine)	DF	3 February 1994 (aged 27)
90	Kaspars Dubra	(Latvia)	DF	20 December 1990 (aged 30)
Midfielders
6	Kyrylo Kovalets	(Ukraine)	MF	2 July 1993 (aged 27)
7	Bohdan Myshenko	(Ukraine)	MF	29 December 1994 (aged 26)
8	Ivan Kalyuzhnyi	(Ukraine)	MF	21 January 1998 (aged 23)
10	Maksym Tretyakov	(Ukraine)	MF	6 March 1996 (aged 25)
16	Kyrylo Dryshlyuk ^{List B}	(Ukraine)	MF	16 September 1999 (aged 21)
17	Valeriy Luchkevych	(Ukraine)	MF	11 January 1996 (aged 25)
19	Andriy Hloba ^{List B}	(Ukraine)	MF	24 January 1999 (aged 22)
22	Emil Mustafayev ^{List B}	(Ukraine)	MF	24 September 2001 (aged 19)
23	Dmytro Shastal	(Ukraine)	MF	30 December 1995 (aged 25)
27	Dmytro Hrechyshkin	(Ukraine)	MF	22 September 1991 (aged 29)
44	Yevhen Banada	(Ukraine)	MF	29 February 1992 (aged 29)
71	Vadym Yanchak ^{List B}	(Ukraine)	MF	7 February 1999 (aged 22)
Forwards
18	Artem Sitalo	(Ukraine)	FW	1 August 1989 (aged 31)
70	Andriy Novikov ^{List B}	(Ukraine)	FW	20 April 1999 (aged 22)
74	Victor César ^{List B}	(Brazil)	FW	30 March 2000 (aged 21)
99	Denys Ustymenko ^{List B}	(Ukraine)	FW	12 April 1999 (aged 22)

== Transfers ==
=== In ===
Date	Pos.	Player	Age	Moving from	Type	Fee	Source
Summer
19 August 2020	MF	(Ukraine) Maksym Tretyakov	24	(Slovakia) Dunajská Streda	Transfer	Undisclosed	
8 September 2020	MF	(Ukraine) Vadym Yanchak	21	(Slovakia) Lokomotíva Košice	Transfer	Free	
6 October 2020	DF	(Ukraine) Valeriy Bondarenko	26	(Ukraine) Shakhtar Donetsk	Transfer	Free	
Summer
12 February 2021	MF	(Ukraine) Ivan Kalyuzhnyi	23	(Ukraine) Dynamo Kyiv	Transfer	Undisclosed	
31 December 2020	DF	(Ukraine) Dmytro Semenov	21	(Latvia) Jelgava	Loan return		
31 December 2020	MF	(Ukraine) Kyrylo Dryshlyuk	21	(Latvia) Spartaks Jūrmala	Loan return		

=== Out ===
Date	Pos.	Player	Age	Moving to	Type	Fee	Source
Summer
31 July 2020	DF	(Ukraine) Anton Shendrik	34	(Autonomous Republic of Crimea) Krymteplytsia Molodizhne	Transfer	Free	
31 July 2020	MF	(Portugal) João Teixeira	24	Unattached	Transfer	Free	
20 August 2020	DF	(Ukraine) Kyrylo Prokopchuk	22	(Ukraine) Polissya Zhytomyr	Transfer	Undisclosed	
3 September 2020	MF	(Ukraine) Yevhen Protasov	23	(Ukraine) Volyn Lutsk	Transfer	Undisclosed	
31 July 2020	MF	(Ukraine) Maksym Tretyakov	24	(Slovakia) Dunajská Streda	Loan return		
Winter
31 December 2020	GK	(Ukraine) Dmytro Rudyk	28	Unattached	Transfer	Free	
16 January 2021	MF	(Ukraine) Denys Bezborodko	26	(Ukraine) Desna Chernihiv	Transfer	Free	
26 January 2021	MF	(Ukraine) Oleksiy Dovhyi	31	(Ukraine) FC Lviv	Transfer	Free	
3 February 2021	MF	(Ukraine) Maksym Zaderaka	26	(Armenia) Ararat Yerevan	Transfer	Free	
5 February 2021	MF	(Ukraine) Vasyl Hrytsuk	33	(Ukraine) Polissya Zhytomyr	Transfer	Free	
27 February 2021	MF	(Ukraine) Mykyta Dudka	20	(Ukraine) Kremin Kremenchuk	Loan		
27 February 2021	MF	(Ukraine) Maksym Ivakhno	21	(Ukraine) Kremin Kremenchuk	Loan		
2 March 2021	DF	(Ukraine) Dmytro Semenov	21	(Ukraine) Kremin Kremenchuk	Loan		

== Pre-season and friendlies ==
12 August 2020 Friendly	FC Oleksandriya (Ukraine)	3–1	(Ukraine) Hirnyk Kryvyi Rih	Oleksandriya
17:30 EEST (UTC+03:00)	Banada 33'; Bezborodko 78' (pen.), 80'	Report	Berko 17'	Stadium: CSC Nika Stadium

15 August 2020 Friendly	SC Dnipro-1 (Ukraine)	0–0	(Ukraine) FC Oleksandriya	Dnipro
15:00 EEST (UTC+03:00)		Report		Stadium: Dnipro-Arena

30 August 2020 Friendly	FC Oleksandriya (Ukraine)	4–2	(Ukraine) Kryvbas Kryvyi Rih (2020)	Oleksandriya
18:00 EEST (UTC+03:00)	Banada 54', 72'; Bezborodko 78'; Kovalets 86'	Report	Yarovoy 15'; Buka 56' (pen.)	Stadium: CSC Nika Stadium

5 September 2020 Friendly	Zorya Luhansk (Ukraine)	4–0	(Ukraine) FC Oleksandriya	Zaporizhia
17:00 EEST (UTC+03:00)	Hladkyy 17'; Hromov 25'; Kabayev 32'; Yurchenko 74'	Report		Stadium: Torpedo Stadium

24 January 2021 Friendly	FC Oleksandriya (Ukraine)	4–1	(North Macedonia) Makedonija Gjorče Petrov	Alanya, Turkey
16:00 EET (UTC+02:00)	Tretyakov; Novikov; Hrechyshkin; Sitalo	Report	Goal	Stadium: Goldcity

26 January 2021 Friendly	FC Oleksandriya (Ukraine)	1–1	(Bulgaria) CSKA 1948 Sofia	Alanya, Turkey
16:00 EET (UTC+02:00)	Yusein (o.g.)	Report	Aleksandrov	Stadium: Goldcity

29 January 2021 Friendly	FC Oleksandriya (Ukraine)	1–0	(Turkey) Alanyaspor U-19	Alanya, Turkey
10:00 EET (UTC+02:00)	Tretyakov (pen.)	Report		Stadium: Goldcity

29 January 2021 Friendly	FC Oleksandriya (Ukraine)	1–3	(Bulgaria) Arda Kardzhali	Alanya, Turkey
16:00 EET (UTC+02:00)	Dubra 26'	Report	Juninho 45', 88'; Delev 72' (pen.)	Stadium: Goldcity

3 February 2021 Friendly	FC Oleksandriya (Ukraine)	0–0	(Poland) ŁKS Łódź	Belek, Turkey
16:30 EET (UTC+02:00)		Report		Stadium: Sueno complex

6 February 2021 Friendly	FC Oleksandriya (Ukraine)	4–1	(Kazakhstan) Kairat Almaty	Belek, Turkey
16:00 EET (UTC+02:00)	Shastal; Sitalo; Novikov; Ustymenko	Report	Goal	Stadium: Gloria sports arena

8 February 2021 Friendly	FC Oleksandriya (Ukraine)	1–1	(Georgia (country)) Saburtalo Tbilisi	Belek, Turkey
16:30 EET (UTC+02:00)	Myshenko 18' (pen.)	Report	78'	Stadium: Sueno

9 February 2021 Friendly	FC Oleksandriya (Ukraine)	3–1	(Latvia) Valmiera	Belek, Turkey
EET (UTC+02:00)	Hrechyshkin (pen.); Vantukh; Banada	Report	Goal	Stadium: Sueno

== Competitions ==
=== Overall ===
Competition	First match	Last match	Starting round	Final position	Record							
Competition	First match	Last match	Starting round	Final position	Pld	W	D	L	GF	GA	GD	Win %
Ukrainian Premier League	22 August 2020	9 May 2021	Matchday 1	9th	26	8	5	13	33	37	−4	30.77
Ukrainian Cup	30 September 2020	21 April 2021	Round of 32 (1/16)	Semi-final	4	2	2	0	9	3	+6	50.00
Total					30	10	7	13	42	40	+2	33.33

Last updated: 9 May 2021
Source: Competitions

=== Premier League ===
==== League table ====
Pos	Team	Pld	W	D	L	GF	GA	GD	Pts
7	SC Dnipro-1	26	8	6	12	36	38	−2	30
8	FC Lviv	26	8	5	13	25	51	−26	29 (Note: Head-to-head goal difference: Lviv +1, Oleksandriya -1)
9	FC Oleksandriya	26	8	5	13	33	37	−4	29
10	Rukh Lviv	26	6	10	10	27	39	−12	28
11	FC Mariupol	26	6	8	12	27	41	−14	26 (Note: Head-to-head points: Mariupol 4, Inhulets 1)

Source: Ukrainian Premier League
Rules for classification: 1) Points; 2) Head-to-head points; 3) Head-to-head goal difference; 4) Head-to-head higher number of goals scored; 5) Goal difference; 6) Higher number of goals scored; 7) Draw or "Golden match" if two teams tied for title (Article 22, paragraph 3).

==== Results summary ====
Overall								Home						Away					
Pld	W	D	L	GF	GA	GD	Pts	W	D	L	GF	GA	GD	W	D	L	GF	GA	GD
26	8	5	13	33	37	−4	29	7	2	4	23	15	+8	1	3	9	10	22	−12

Last updated: 9 May 2021.
Source: Competitive matches

==== Results by round ====
Round	1	2	3	4	5	6	7	8	9	10	11	12	13	14	15	16	17	18	19	20	21	22	23	24	25	26
Ground	H	A	H	H	A	H	A	H	H	A	H	A	H	A	H	A	A	H	A	H	A	A	H	A	H	A
Result	W	L	L	W	L	W	L	D	W	D	D	D	L	W	W	L	D	W	L	L	L	L	W	L	L	L
Position	3	4	9	7	8	8	9	9	7	6	7	8	8	6	6	6	6	7	7	7	7	7	7	7	7	9

Updated to match(es) played on 9 May 2021. Source: Competitive matches
A = Away; H = Home; W = Win; D = Draw; L = Loss

==== Matches ====
22 August 2020 1	FC Oleksandriya	4–1	FC Mariupol	Oleksandriya
19:30 EEST (UTC+03:00)	Pashayev (yellow card) 18'; Shastal 45'; Hordiyenko 47'; Myshenko 49'; Bezborodko 90+2'	Report	Kashchuk (yellow card) 4'; Tyschenko (yellow card) 7'; Bykov (yellow card) 11'; Topalov (yellow card) 33'; Ihnatenko (yellow card) 62'; Sahutkin (yellow card) 64'; Myshnyov (yellow card) 74'; Kulakov 82'	Stadium: CSC Nika Stadium; Attendance: 0 Referee: Dmytro Kutakov
Note: Match was played behind closed doors due to quarantine in Ukraine during COVID-19 pandemic.

13 September 2020 2	FC Mynai	1–0	FC Oleksandriya	Uzhhorod
14:00 EEST (UTC+03:00)	Shynder 34', (yellow card) 43'; Popovich (yellow card) 90+3'	Report	Pankiv (yellow card) 27'; Hrechyshkin (yellow card) 49'; Dubra (yellow card) 68'; Hordiyenko (yellow card) 74'	Stadium: Avanhard Stadium; Attendance: 2,106; Referee: Mykola Balakin

19 September 2020 3	FC Oleksandriya	0–2	Vorskla Poltava	Oleksandriya
14:00 EEST (UTC+03:00)	Myshenko (yellow card) 13'; Miroshnichenko (yellow card) 22'; Pashayev (yellow card) 56'; Banada (yellow card) 75'	Report	Puclin (yellow card) 16', (goal) 52'; Stepanyuk 25'; Kane (yellow card) 38'; Kulach (yellow card) 46'; Pešić (yellow card) 90'	Stadium: CSC Nika Stadium; Attendance: 1,800; Referee: Kateryna Monzul

26 September 2020 4	FC Oleksandriya	4–1	SC Dnipro-1	Oleksandriya
19:30 EEST (UTC+03:00)	Bezborodko 3'; Sitalo (yellow card) 26'; Tretyakov 37'; Svatok 60' (o.g.); Luchkevych 69'; Banada (yellow card) 79'	Report	Dubinchak (yellow card) 19'; Adamyuk (yellow card) 25', (goal) 78'; Tsurikov (yellow card) 56'; Svatok (yellow card) 63'	Stadium: CSC Nika Stadium; Attendance: 825; Referee: Ihor Paskhal

4 October 2020 5	Olimpik Donetsk	3–2	FC Oleksandriya	Kyiv
14:00 EEST (UTC+03:00)	Zahedi 8'; Babohlo 25' (o.g.); Zotko 44' (pen.); Politylo (yellow card) 45+1'; Do Couto (yellow card) 60'; Snurnitsyn (yellow card) 73'	Report	Babohlo (yellow card) 44'; Banada (red card) 45+1'; Sitalo 62'; Hrechyshkin 90+2' (pen.), (yellow card) 90+3'	Stadium: Dynamo Stadium; Attendance: 0 Referee: Maksym Kozyryatskyi
Note: Match was played behind closed doors due to quarantine in Ukraine during COVID-19 pandemic.

18 October 2020 6	FC Oleksandriya	4–3	Inhulets Petrove	Oleksandriya
17:00 EEST (UTC+03:00)	Hrytsuk 7'; Ustymenko 10'; Luchkevych (yellow card) 28' (yellow-red card) 45'; Pashayev (yellow card) 34'; Bondarenko 35'; Dudka 41'; Myshenko (yellow card) 58'; Melnyk (yellow card) 74'	Report	Yanakov (yellow card) 24', (goal) 74' (pen.); Kovalenko 44', (yellow card) 45'; Kucherenko (yellow card) 48'; Balan (yellow card) 52'; Bartulović 67' (pen.); Pavlov (red card) 69'	Stadium: CSC Nika Stadium; Attendance: 0 Referee: Serhiy Boyko
Note: Match was played behind closed doors due to quarantine in Ukraine during COVID-19 pandemic.

24 October 2020 7	Dynamo Kyiv	1–0	FC Oleksandriya	Kyiv
17:00 EEST (UTC+03:00)	Popov 1', (yellow card) 51' de Pena (yellow card) 21'; Rodrigues (yellow card) 33'; Kędziora (yellow card) 41'; Sydorchuk (yellow card) 82'; Shaparenko (red card) 89'	Report	Hrytsuk (yellow card) 48'; Stetskov (yellow card) 57'; Melnyk (yellow card) 77'; Bondarenko (yellow card) 90+3'	Stadium: NSC Olimpiyskiy; Attendance: 0 Referee: Maksym Kozyryatskyi
Note: Match was played behind closed doors due to quarantine in Ukraine during COVID-19 pandemic.

31 October 2020 8	FC Oleksandriya	2–2	Desna Chernihiv	Oleksandriya
17:00 EET (UTC+02:00)	Myshenko (yellow card) 44'; Tretyakov (yellow card) 50'; Pashayev (yellow card) 70'; Banada 72'; Sitalo 82', (yellow card) 83'	Report	Mostovyi (yellow card) 25'; Hitchenko (yellow card) 28'; Ohirya (yellow card) 34'; Totovytskyi 40' (pen.); Imerekov (yellow card) 65' (yellow-red card) 89'; Budkivskyi 84'	Stadium: CSC Nika Stadium; Attendance: 0 Referee: Yaroslav Kozyk
Note: Match was played behind closed doors due to quarantine in Ukraine during COVID-19 pandemic.

7 November 2020 9	FC Oleksandriya	1–0	FC Lviv	Oleksandriya
17:00 EET (UTC+02:00)	Bezborodko (yellow card) 48'; Tretyakov 70' (pen.); Hrechyshkin (yellow card) 89'	Report	Kazlauskas (yellow card) 4'; Rafael Sabino (yellow card) 62'	Stadium: CSC Nika Stadium; Attendance: 0 Referee: Yuriy Ivanov
Note: Match was played behind closed doors due to quarantine in Ukraine during COVID-19 pandemic.

21 November 2020 10	Shakhtar Donetsk	1–1	FC Oleksandriya	Kyiv
17:00 EET (UTC+02:00)	Cipriano (yellow card) 5'; Moraes (red card) 31'; Dodô 47'; Matviyenko (yellow card) 83'	Report	Tretyakov (yellow card) 45+1'; Banada 53'; Kovalets (yellow card) 76'	Stadium: NSC Olimpiyskiy; Attendance: 0 Referee: Kateryna Monzul
Note: Match was played behind closed doors due to quarantine in Ukraine during COVID-19 pandemic.

28 November 2020 11	FC Oleksandriya	0–0	Rukh Lviv	Oleksandriya
14:00 EET (UTC+02:00)	Bondarenko (yellow card) 58' (yellow-red card) 59'; Zaderaka (yellow card) 76'; Pashayev (yellow card) 83'	Report	Martynyuk (yellow card) 26'; Paramonov (yellow card) 39'; Fedorchuk (yellow card) 64'; Mysyk (yellow card) 66'; Kukharevych (yellow card) 74'	Stadium: CSC Nika Stadium; Attendance: 0 Referee: Anatoliy Abdula
Note: Match was played behind closed doors due to quarantine in Ukraine during COVID-19 pandemic.

6 December 2020 12	Kolos Kovalivka	1–1	FC Oleksandriya	Kovalivka
19:30 EET (UTC+02:00)	Seleznyov (yellow card) 8', (goal) 26' (pen.); Antyukh (yellow card) 83'	Report	Hrechyshkin (yellow card) 16'; Pashayev (yellow card) 52'; Shastal 54'; Myshenko (yellow card) 57'; Babohlo (yellow card) 69'	Stadium: Kolos Stadium; Attendance: 0 Referee: Yuriy Mozharovskyi
Note: Match was played behind closed doors due to quarantine in Ukraine during COVID-19 pandemic.

13 December 2020 13	FC Oleksandriya	0–2	Zorya Luhansk	Oleksandriya
19:30 EET (UTC+02:00)	Dovhyi (yellow card) 35'; Sitalo (yellow card) 60'; Bezborodko (yellow card) 82' (yellow-red card) 83'	Report	Kabayev (yellow card) 3' (yellow-red card) 50'; Hladkyy (yellow card) 4'; Abu Hanna (yellow card) 8'; Ivanisenya 31', (yellow card) 83'; Shevchenko (yellow card) 64'; Sayyadmanesh 90+4'	Stadium: CSC Nika Stadium; Attendance: 0 Referee: Vitaliy Romanov
Note: Match was played behind closed doors due to quarantine in Ukraine during COVID-19 pandemic.

14 February 2021 14	FC Mariupol	0–1	FC Oleksandriya	Zaporizhia
14:00 EET (UTC+02:00)	Ocheretko (yellow card) 47'; Kyryukhantsev (yellow card) 52'; Bykov (yellow card) 64'; Chobotenko (yellow card) 73'	Report	Sitalo (yellow card) 5', (goal) 38'; Pashayev (yellow card) 65'; Miroshnichenko (yellow card) 90+4'	Stadium: Slavutych-Arena; Attendance: 0 Referee: Oleksandr Shandor
Note: Match was played behind closed doors due to quarantine in Ukraine during COVID-19 pandemic.

20 February 2021 15	FC Oleksandriya	3–0	FC Mynai	Oleksandriya
17:00 EET (UTC+02:00)	Pashayev (yellow card) 14'; Luchkevych 40'; Bondarenko 52'; Vantukh 57'	Report	Tkachuk (yellow card) 5'	Stadium: CSC Nika Stadium; Attendance: 0 Referee: Anatoliy Abdula
Note: Match was played behind closed doors due to quarantine in Ukraine during COVID-19 pandemic.

27 February 2021 16	Vorskla Poltava	3–1	FC Oleksandriya	Poltava
17:00 EET (UTC+02:00)	Kulach 39', 77' (pen.); Thill 70' de Nooijer (yellow card) 89'	Report	Hrechyshkin (yellow card) 2'; Vantukh (yellow card) 52'; Babohlo 55'; Shastal (yellow card) 57'; Banada (yellow card) 76'; Sitalo (yellow card) 79'	Stadium: Vorskla Stadium; Attendance: 1,050; Referee: Dmytro Shurman

8 March 2021 17	SC Dnipro-1	0–0	FC Oleksandriya	Dnipro
14:00 EET (UTC+02:00)	Lohinov (yellow card) 18'; Ihnatenko (yellow card) 31'; Nazarenko (yellow card) 58'	Report	Vantukh (yellow card) 55'; Pashayev (yellow card) 84'; Miroshnichenko (yellow card) 90'	Stadium: Dnipro-Arena; Attendance: 2,139; Referee: Andriy Kovalenko

14 March 2021 18	FC Oleksandriya	2–0	Olimpik Donetsk	Oleksandriya
19:30 EET (UTC+02:00)	Bondarenko 28'; Sitalo (yellow card) 39'; Banada (yellow card) 73'; Stetskov 90'	Report	Dramé (yellow card) 45'; Romanovskij (yellow card) 56'	Stadium: CSC Nika Stadium; Attendance: 689; Referee: Oleksiy Derevinskyi

21 March 2021 19	Inhulets Petrove	1–0	FC Oleksandriya	Kropyvnytskyi
14:00 EET (UTC+02:00)	Sichinava 45+1'; Shyshka (yellow card) 53'; Zaporozhets (yellow card) 59'; Kovalenko (yellow card) 62'; Malysh (yellow card) 90+1'	Report	Babohlo (yellow card) 72'; Myshenko (yellow card) 77'; Sitalo (yellow card) 79'	Stadium: Zirka Stadium; Attendance: 519; Referee: Volodymyr Novokhatniy

3 April 2021 20	FC Oleksandriya	1–2	Dynamo Kyiv	Oleksandriya
19:30 EEST (UTC+03:00)	Sitalo 14'; Tretyakov (yellow card) 37'	Report	Shaparenko 35' (pen.); Popov (yellow card) 55'; Kędziora (yellow card) 60'; Rodrigues (yellow card) 75', (goal) 90'	Stadium: CSC Nika Stadium; Attendance: 2,012; Referee: Dmytro Kryvushkin

10 April 2020 21	Desna Chernihiv	4–1	FC Oleksandriya	Chernihiv
19:30 EEST (UTC+03:00)	Imerekov 32'; Konoplya (yellow card) 50'; Totovytskyi 54', 90+2'; Bezborodko (yellow card) 58'; Hutsulyak 78'; Ohirya (yellow card) 80'	Report	Kovalets 29'	Stadium: Chernihiv Stadium; Attendance: 0 Referee: Denys Shurman
Note: Match was played behind closed doors due to quarantine in Ukraine during COVID-19 pandemic.

16 April 2021 22	FC Lviv	3–1	FC Oleksandriya	Lviv
17:00 EEST (UTC+03:00)	Antwi 39', (yellow card) 61'; Brikner 43'; Nych 56'; Rafael Sabino (yellow card) 89'	Report	Ustymenko 30'; Dubra (yellow card) 74'; Hrechyshkin (yellow card) 85'	Stadium: Arena Lviv; Attendance: 0 Referee: Oleksiy Derevinskyi

25 April 2021 23	FC Oleksandriya	2–0	Shakhtar Donetsk	Oleksandriya
17:00 EET (UTC+02:00)	Banada (yellow card) 11'; Hrechyshkin 44' (pen.); Dubra (yellow card) 47'; Shastal 54'	Report	Solomon (yellow card) 20'; Khocholava (yellow card) 73'; Korniyenko (yellow card) 76'	Stadium: CSC Nika Stadium; Attendance: 2,138; Referee: Serhiy Boyko

2 May 2021 24	Rukh Lviv	2–1	FC Oleksandriya	Lviv
14:00 EET (UTC+02:00)	Martynyuk (yellow card) 38'; Prytula 52'; Boychuk 54'	Report	Tretyakov 15'	Stadium: Arena Lviv; Attendance: 808; Referee: Kateryna Monzul

5 May 2021 25	FC Oleksandriya	0–2	Kolos Kovalivka	Oleksandriya
19:00 EET (UTC+02:00)	Shastal (yellow card) 23'; Dryshlyuk (yellow card) 44'; Ustymenko (yellow card) 45'; Stetskov (yellow card) 55'; Banada (yellow card) 66'; Bondarenko (yellow card) 90+3'	Report	Petrov 42' (pen.); Milko (yellow card) 49'; Orikhovskyi 57', (yellow card) 60'; Bohdanov (yellow card) 66'	Stadium: CSC Nika Stadium; Attendance: 630; Referee: Oleksandr Shandor

9 May 2021 26	Zorya Luhansk	2–1	FC Oleksandriya	Zaporizhia
14:00 EEST (UTC+03:00)	Rufati (yellow card) 33'; Hladkyy 63'; Alefirenko 73'; Zahedi (yellow card) 80'	Report	Kovalets (yellow card) 27'; Hrechyshkin (yellow card) 45'; Melnyk (yellow card) 50'; Novikov 86'	Stadium: Slavutych-Arena; Attendance: 762; Referee: Oleksandr Solovyan

=== Ukrainian Cup ===
30 September 2020 Round of 32 (1/16)	FC Oleksandriya	4–1	Inhulets Petrove	Oleksandriya
18:30 EEST (UTC+03:00)	Babohlo (yellow card) 41'; Sitalo 57'; Banada 62'; Luchkevych 69'; Zaderaka 75'	Report	Mkomola (yellow card) 40'; Fatyeyev (yellow card) 60'; Zaporozhets (yellow card) 71'; Lytvyak 83'	Stadium: CSC Nika Stadium; Attendance: 726; Referee: Dmytro Bondarenko

2 December 2020 Round of 32 (1/16)	FC Oleksandriya	3–0	FC Mynai	Oleksandriya
16:30 EET (UTC+02:00)	Vantukh 6'; Shastal (yellow card) 33'; Bondarenko 62' (pen.); Dovhyi 90+4'	Report	Lopyryonok (yellow card) 29'; Holodyuk (yellow card) 50'; Kozhanov (yellow card) 57'	Stadium: CSC Nika Stadium; Attendance: 0 Referee: Yevhen Aranovskyi

3 March 2021 Quarter-final	SC Dnipro-1	1–1 (3 – 4 p)	FC Oleksandriya	Dnipro
19:00 EET (UTC+02:00)	Di Franco (yellow card) 18'; Adamyuk (yellow card) 74'; Buletsa 79'; Pikhalyonok (yellow card) 116'	Report	Hrechyshkin (yellow card) 47' (yellow-red card) 75'; Tretyakov 62'; Sitalo (yellow card) 90+2'	Stadium: Dnipro-Arena; Attendance: 2,367; Referee: Oleksnadr Shandor
	Penalties
	Dovbyk (penalty missed); Douglas (penalty scored); Pikhalyonok (penalty scored); Khoblenko (penalty scored); Buletsa (penalty missed)		Melnyk (penalty scored); Babohlo (penalty scored); Bondarenko (penalty scored); Stetskov (penalty scored)

21 April 2021 Semifinal	FC Oleksandriya	1–1 (3 – 4 p)	Zorya Luhansk	Oleksandriya
18:30 EEST (UTC+03:00)	Bondarenko (yellow card) 63', (goal) 90+2' (pen.)	Report	Kocherhin (yellow card) 7', (goal) 20'; Ivanisenya (yellow card) 60'; Hladkyy (yellow card) 62'; Cigaņiks (yellow card) 79'; Vernydub (yellow card) 111'	Stadium: CSC Nika Stadium; Attendance: 0 Referee: Ihor Paskhal
	Penalties
	Shastal (penalty scored); Bondarenko (penalty scored); Myshenko (penalty scored); Dubra (penalty missed); Stetskov (penalty missed)		Nazaryna (penalty scored); Zahedi (penalty scored); Ivanisenya (penalty missed); Yurchenko (penalty scored); Favorov (penalty scored)

== Statistics ==
=== Appearances and goals ===
No.	Pos	Nat	Player	Total		Premier League		Cup	
No.	Pos	Nat	Player	Apps	Goals	Apps	Goals	Apps	Goals
Goalkeepers
26	GK	(Ukraine) UKR	Vyacheslav Borysenko	1	0	1	0	0	0
31	GK	(Ukraine) UKR	Oleh Bilyk	8	0	7	0	1	0
79	GK	(Ukraine) UKR	Yuriy Pankiv	21	0	18	0	3	0
Defenders
2	DF	(Ukraine) UKR	Oleksandr Melnyk	10	0	7+2	0	0+1	0
3	DF	(Ukraine) UKR	Artem Hordiyenko	5	1	4+1	1	0	0
4	DF	(Ukraine) UKR	Vladyslav Babohlo	24	1	15+6	1	3	0
5	DF	(Ukraine) UKR	Tymur Stetskov	22	1	4+14	1	1+3	0
11	DF	(Ukraine) UKR	Denys Miroshnichenko	17	0	12+3	0	1+1	0
13	DF	(Ukraine) UKR	Hlib Bukhal	1	0	1	0	0	0
20	DF	(Azerbaijan) AZE	Pavel Pashayev	23	0	20	0	2+1	0
47	DF	(Ukraine) UKR	Roman Vantukh	20	2	16+1	1	3	1
55	DF	(Ukraine) UKR	Valeriy Bondarenko	21	5	17+1	3	3	2
90	DF	(Latvia) LAT	Kaspars Dubra	18	0	15+1	0	2	0
Midfielders
6	MF	(Ukraine) UKR	Kyrylo Kovalets	21	1	16+2	1	2+1	0
7	MF	(Ukraine) UKR	Bohdan Myshenko	18	1	6+9	1	0+3	0
8	MF	(Ukraine) UKR	Ivan Kalyuzhnyi	6	0	1+4	0	0+1	0
10	MF	(Ukraine) UKR	Maksym Tretyakov	25	4	16+6	3	3	1
16	MF	(Ukraine) UKR	Kyrylo Dryshlyuk	5	0	3+1	0	1	0
17	MF	(Ukraine) UKR	Valeriy Luchkevych	25	3	20+1	2	4	1
19	MF	(Ukraine) UKR	Andriy Hloba	3	0	1+2	0	0	0
22	MF	(Ukraine) UKR	Emil Mustafayev	1	0	0+1	0	0	0
23	MF	(Ukraine) UKR	Dmytro Shastal	18	3	11+4	3	2+1	0
27	MF	(Ukraine) UKR	Dmytro Hrechyshkin	27	2	22+2	2	3	0
44	MF	(Ukraine) UKR	Yevhen Banada	23	3	18+2	2	3	1
71	MF	(Ukraine) UKR	Vadym Yanchak	1	0	0+1	0	0	0
Forwards
18	FW	(Ukraine) UKR	Artem Sitalo	24	5	17+3	4	4	1
70	FW	(Ukraine) UKR	Andriy Novikov	8	1	0+8	1	0	0
99	FW	(Ukraine) UKR	Denys Ustymenko	22	2	7+12	2	0+3	0
Players transferred out during the season
8	MF	(Ukraine) UKR	Oleksiy Dovhyi	7	1	2+3	0	2	1
9	FW	(Ukraine) UKR	Denys Bezborodko	11	2	3+8	2	0	0
22	MF	(Ukraine) UKR	Vasyl Hrytsuk	10	1	3+5	1	1+1	0
30	MF	(Ukraine) UKR	Mykyta Dudka	2	1	2	1	0	0
94	MF	(Ukraine) UKR	Maksym Zaderaka	10	1	1+7	0	0+2	1

Source: Competitions

Last updated: 9 May 2021

=== Goalscorers ===
Rank	No.	Pos	Nat	Name	Premier League	Cup	Total
1	18	FW	(Ukraine)	Artem Sitalo	4	1	5
1	55	DF	(Ukraine)	Valeriy Bondarenko	3	2	5
3	10	MF	(Ukraine)	Maksym Tretyakov	3	1	4
4	17	MF	(Ukraine)	Valeriy Luchkevych	2	1	3
4	23	MF	(Ukraine)	Dmytro Shastal	3	0	3
4	44	MF	(Ukraine)	Yevhen Banada	2	1	3
7	9	FW	(Ukraine)	Denys Bezborodko	2	0	2
7	27	MF	(Ukraine)	Dmytro Hrechyshkin	2	0	2
7	47	DF	(Ukraine)	Roman Vantukh	1	1	2
7	99	FW	(Ukraine)	Denys Ustymenko	2	0	2
11	3	DF	(Ukraine)	Artem Hordiyenko	1	0	1
11	4	DF	(Ukraine)	Vladyslav Babohlo	1	0	1
11	5	DF	(Ukraine)	Tymur Stetskov	1	0	1
11	6	MF	(Ukraine)	Kyrylo Kovalets	1	0	1
11	7	MF	(Ukraine)	Bohdan Myshenko	1	0	1
11	8	MF	(Ukraine)	Oleksiy Dovhyi	0	1	1
11	22	MF	(Ukraine)	Vasyl Hrytsuk	1	0	1
11	30	MF	(Ukraine)	Mykyta Dudka	1	0	1
11	70	FW	(Ukraine)	Andriy Novikov	1	0	1
11	94	MF	(Ukraine)	Maksym Zaderaka	0	1	1
				Own goal	1	0	1
				Total	34	8	42

Last updated: 9 May 2021

=== Clean sheets ===
Rank	No.	Pos	Nat	Name	Premier League	Cup	Total
1	79	GK	(Ukraine)	Yuriy Pankiv	5	1	6
2	31	GK	(Ukraine)	Oleh Bilyk	2	0	2
				Total	7	1	8

Last updated: 9 May 2021

=== Disciplinary record ===
No.	Pos	Nat	Player	Premier League			Cup			Total		
No.	Pos	Nat	Player	Booked	(yellow card) (yellow-red card)	Sent off (straight red)	Booked	(yellow card) (yellow-red card)	Sent off (straight red)	Booked	(yellow card) (yellow-red card)	Sent off (straight red)
2	DF	(Ukraine)	Oleksandr Melnyk	3	0	0	0	0	0	3	0	0
3	DF	(Ukraine)	Artem Hordiyenko	1	0	0	0	0	0	1	0	0
4	DF	(Ukraine)	Vladyslav Babohlo	3	0	0	1	0	0	4	0	0
5	DF	(Ukraine)	Tymur Stetskov	2	0	0	0	0	0	2	0	0
6	MF	(Ukraine)	Kyrylo Kovalets	2	0	0	0	0	0	2	0	0
7	MF	(Ukraine)	Bohdan Myshenko	5	0	0	0	0	0	5	0	0
8	MF	(Ukraine)	Oleksiy Dovhyi	1	0	0	0	0	0	1	0	0
9	FW	(Ukraine)	Denys Bezborodko	1	1	0	0	0	0	1	1	0
10	MF	(Ukraine)	Maksym Tretyakov	3	0	0	0	0	0	3	0	0
11	DF	(Ukraine)	Denys Miroshnichenko	3	0	0	0	0	0	3	0	0
16	MF	(Ukraine)	Kyrylo Dryshlyuk	1	0	0	0	0	0	1	0	0
17	MF	(Ukraine)	Valeriy Luchkevych	1	1	0	0	0	0	1	1	0
18	FW	(Ukraine)	Artem Sitalo	7	0	0	1	0	0	8	0	0
20	DF	(Azerbaijan)	Pavel Pashayev	9	0	0	0	0	0	9	0	0
22	MF	(Ukraine)	Vasyl Hrytsuk	1	0	0	0	0	0	1	0	0
23	MF	(Ukraine)	Dmytro Shastal	2	0	0	1	0	0	3	0	0
27	MF	(Ukraine)	Dmytro Hrechyshkin	6	0	0	0	1	0	6	1	0
44	MF	(Ukraine)	Yevhen Banada	6	0	1	0	0	0	6	0	1
47	DF	(Ukraine)	Roman Vantukh	2	0	0	0	0	0	2	0	0
55	DF	(Ukraine)	Valeriy Bondarenko	2	1	0	1	0	0	3	1	0
79	GK	(Ukraine)	Yuriy Pankiv	1	0	0	0	0	0	1	0	0
90	DF	(Latvia)	Kaspars Dubra	3	0	0	0	0	0	3	0	0
94	MF	(Ukraine)	Maksym Zaderaka	1	0	0	0	0	0	1	0	0
99	FW	(Ukraine)	Denys Ustymenko	1	0	0	0	0	0	1	0	0
			Total	67	3	1	4	1	0	71	4	1

Last updated: 9 May 2021

=== Attendances ===
	Matches	Attendances	Average	High	Low
Premier League	13	8,094	622	2,138	0
Cup	2	726	363	726	0
Total	15	8,820	588	2,138	0

Last updated: 9 May 2021
