= Nicolás Arévalo =

Footballer (born 2003)

Personal information
- Full name: Joseph Nicolás Arévalo Chaparro
- Date of birth: 13 January 2003 (age 23)
- Place of birth: Bogota, Colombia
- Height: 1.76 m (5 ft 9 in)
- Position: Winger

Team information
- Current team: FC Kharkiv
- Number: 16

Youth career
- 2021–2023: Millonarios

Senior career*
Years	Team	Apps	(Gls)
2023–2026	Millonarios	46	(1)
2026–	Kharkiv	12	(0)

International career
2023	Colombia U-20	0	(0)
- * Club domestic league appearances and goals

Joseph Nicolás Arévalo Chaparro, for short Nicolás Arévalo (born 13 January 2003) is a professional Colombian footballer who plays as a defensive midfielder for Ukrainian Premier League club FC Kharkiv.

After spending about two years competing in the Millonarios grassroots divisions; finally, on 28 January 2023, he received his first call-up to the first team, summoned by Alberto Gamero, then coach of the team, for a match against Deportivo Pereira for the Apertura 2023 Tournament.

His professional debut came almost a month after his first call-up, on February 18, 2023, in a match for the same competition against Jaguares de Córdoba, entering in the 88th minute of play, replacing Óscar Cortés.

On August 23, 2025, he scored his first goal as a professional, in a 3–0 victory against Junior de Barranquilla in the 2025 Finalization Tournament.

On January 15, 2026, his transfer to FC Metalist 1925 Kharkiv of the Ukrainian Premier League was confirmed.

His first approach to his national team took place in April 2023 when he was summoned along with his teammate at Millonarios, Samuel Asprilla, for a preparatory microcycle by Héctor Cárdenas, who was the head coach of the Colombia national under-20 football team.
