= Ivan Kalyuzhnyi =

Ukrainian footballer

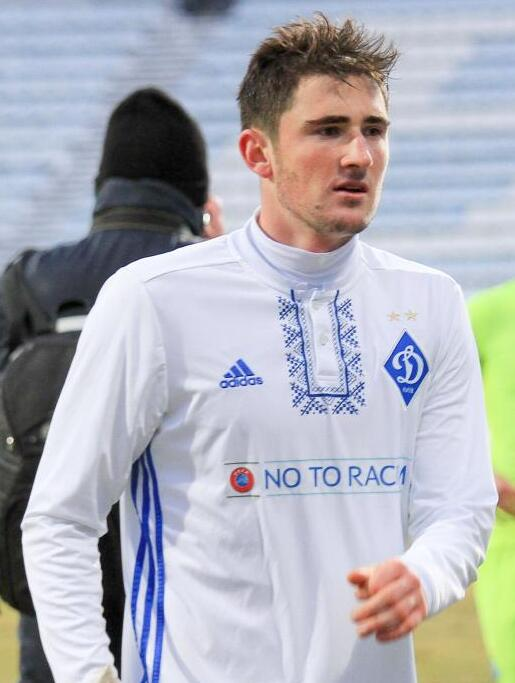
- Kalyuzhnyi with Dynamo Kyiv in 2016

Personal information
- Full name: Ivan Volodymyrovych Kalyuzhnyi
- Date of birth: 21 January 1998 (age 28)
- Place of birth: Dovzhyk, Zolochiv Raion, Kharkiv Oblast, Ukraine
- Height: 1.91 m (6 ft 3 in)
- Position: Central midfielder

Team information
- Current team: Kharkiv
- Number: 5

Youth career
- 2005–2008: Arsenal Kharkiv
- 2008–2015: Metalist Kharkiv
- 2015: Dynamo Kyiv

Senior career*
| Years | Team | Apps | (Gls) |
| 2015–2020 | Dynamo Kyiv | 0 | (0) |
| 2018–2019 | → Metalist 1925 Kharkiv (loan) | 26 | (1) |
| 2019–2020 | → Rukh Lviv (loan) | 30 | (2) |
| 2021–2025 | Oleksandriya | 64 | (4) |
| 2022 | → Keflavík (loan) | 6 | (0) |
| 2022–2023 | → Kerala Blasters (loan) | 18 | (4) |
| 2023 | → LNZ Cherkasy (loan) | 8 | (0) |
| 2025– | Kharkiv | 27 | (2) |

International career^{‡}
| 2013–2015 | Ukraine U17 | 24 | (0) |
| 2024– | Ukraine | 14 | (1) |
- * Club domestic league appearances and goals as of 3 June 2026 ‡ National team caps and goals as of 31 March 2026 (UTC)

Ivan Volodymyrovych Kalyuzhnyi (Ukrainian: Іван Володимирович Калюжний; born 21 January 1998) is a Ukrainian professional footballer who plays as a central midfielder for Ukrainian Premier League club Kharkiv, which he captains, and the Ukraine national team.

== Club career ==
=== Youth and early career ===
Born in Zolochiv Raion, Kharkiv Oblast, Kalyuzhnyi started his youth career from FC Arsenal Kharkiv after which he moved to Metalist Kharkhiv. His first trainers in Metalist were Volodymyr Linke and Oleh Kramarenko. Later he moved from Kharkiv to Dynamo Kyiv. He played for Dynamo Kyiv U19 team from 2015 to 2018. Kalyuzhnyi managed to score one goal from 12 matches in the UEFA Youth League.

In 2018, Kaliushny was loaned to Metalist 1925 Kharkiv. He made his professional debut with them in the 2018-2019 season and scored one goal in 27 appearances. He was loaned to Rukh in 2019. Kaliushny made his debut in the Ukrainian Premier League for Rukh on 23 August 2020, playing in a losing away match against FC Vorskla Poltava.

In February 2021, Kaliushny made a permanent move to FK Oleksandria. In 23 games total, he scored two goals and provided four assists. Two of these goals were in the Ukrainian Premier League. Kaliuahny made the third loan spell in his career by playing for the Icelandic top division club Keflavik. He arrived at the start of 2022 and made seven appearances.

=== Kerala Blasters (loan) ===
On 18 July 2022, Indian Super League club Kerala Blasters announced the signing of Kalyuzhnyi, on a season-long loan deal from Oleksandriya for the 2022–23 season. He made his Kerala Blasters debut on 7 October against East Bengal, coming on as a substitute for Apostolos Giannou in the 79th minute. Kalyuzhnyi scored his debut goal two minutes later in the 81st minute, and doubled his tally in the 89th minute with a left-footed volley from long range. His two goals helped the Blasters to seal a 3–1 win, and he won the Hero of the Match Award.

Kalyuzhnyi scored again in their next match against ATK Mohun Bagan on 16 October. His goal in the 8th minute put the Blasters 1-0 up, but the side went on to lose the match 2–5 at full-time. On 13 November, Kalyuzhnyi went top of the ISL goals chart with a long-range goal in the 52nd minute in a 3–1 win against FC Goa. This helped the Blasters' to win their first match against Goa since 2016, and Kalyuzhnyi was also chosen as the man of the match. He won his third MOTM award in their next match versus Hyderabad FC, which they won 0–1.

== International career ==
On 11 October 2024, in the game against Georgia, he made his first senior appearance for Ukraine.

== Career statistics ==
=== Club ===
As of match played 29 March 2025

Appearances and goals by club, season and competition
| Club | Season | League | | | National cup (Note: Includes Ukrainian Cup, Icelandic Men's Cup) | | Continental | | Total | |
| Club | Season | Division | Apps | Goals | Apps | Goals | Apps | Goals | Apps | Goals |
|---|---|---|---|---|---|---|---|---|---|---|
| Metalist 1925 Kharkiv (loan) | 2018–19 | Ukrainian First League | 26 | 1 | 1 | 0 | — | | 27 | 1 |
| Rukh Lviv (loan) | 2019–20 | Ukrainian First League | 27 | 2 | 1 | 0 | — | | 28 | 2 |
| Rukh Lviv (loan) | 2020–21 | Ukrainian Premier League | 3 | 0 | 1 | 0 | — | | 4 | 0 |
| Rukh Lviv (loan) | Total | | 30 | 2 | 2 | 0 | 0 | 0 | 32 | 2 |
| Oleksandriya | 2020–21 | Ukrainian Premier League | 5 | 0 | 1 | 0 | — | | 6 | 0 |
| Oleksandriya | 2021–22 | Ukrainian Premier League | 16 | 2 | 1 | 0 | — | | 17 | 2 |
| Oleksandriya | 2023–24 | Ukrainian Premier League | 16 | 0 | 0 | 0 | — | | 16 | 0 |
| Oleksandriya | 2024–25 | Ukrainian Premier League | 21 | 1 | 0 | 0 | — | | 21 | 1 |
| Oleksandriya | Total | | 58 | 3 | 2 | 0 | 0 | 0 | 60 | 3 |
| Keflavík (loan) | 2022 | Icelandic Men's Division | 6 | 0 | 1 | 0 | — | | 7 | 0 |
| Kerala Blasters (loan) | 2022–23 | Indian Super League | 18 | 4 | 0 | 0 | — | | 18 | 4 |
| LNZ Cherkasy (loan) | 2023–24 | Ukrainian Premier League | 8 | 0 | 0 | 0 | — | | 8 | 0 |
| Career total | | | 146 | 10 | 6 | 0 | 0 | 0 | 152 | 10 |

=== International ===
As of match played 31 March 2026

Appearances and goals by national team and year
| National team | Year | Apps | Goals |
|---|---|---|---|
| Ukraine | 2024 | 4 | 0 |
| Ukraine | 2025 | 8 | 1 |
| Ukraine | 2026 | 2 | 0 |
| Total | | 14 | 1 |
