= Mykyta Dudka =

Ukrainian footballer

Personal information
- Full name: Mykyta Yuriyovych Dudka
- Date of birth: 18 December 2000 (age 25)
- Place of birth: Kremenchuk, Ukraine
- Height: 1.75 m (5 ft 9 in)
- Position: Midfielder

Team information
- Current team: Hirnyk-Sport Horishni Plavni
- Number: 8

Youth career
- 2007–2017: Kremin Kremenchuk

Senior career*
Years	Team	Apps	(Gls)
2017–2018	Vorskla Poltava	0	(0)
2018–2021	Oleksandriya	2	(1)
2021	→ Kremin Kremenchuk (loan)	8	(0)
2023–2024	Rokyta	11	(0)
2024–	Hirnyk-Sport Horishni Plavni	19	(0)
- * Club domestic league appearances and goals as of 5 May 2025

Mykyta Yuriyovych Dudka (Ukrainian: Микита Юрійович Дудка; born 18 December 2000) is a Ukrainian professional footballer who plays as a midfielder for Hirnyk-Sport Horishni Plavni.

== Career ==
Born in Kremenchuk, Dudka is a product of the Kremin Kremenchuk youth sportive school in his native city.

He played for Vorskla Poltava and after that for FC Oleksandriya in the Ukrainian Premier League Reserves competition. Dudka made his debut in the Ukrainian Premier League for Oleksandriya on 18 October 2020, playing as a start squad player in a winning home match against FC Inhulets Petrove and scored one goal.
