= Ihor Boychuk =

Ukrainian footballer

Personal information
- Full name: Ihor Vasylyovych Boychuk
- Date of birth: 10 January 1994 (age 32)
- Place of birth: Chernivtsi, Ukraine
- Height: 1.81 m (5 ft 11 1/2 in)
- Position: Midfielder

Team information
- Current team: Ahrobiznes Volochysk
- Number: 21

Youth career
- 2008–2011: Bukovyna Chernivtsi

Senior career*
Years	Team	Apps	(Gls)
2011–2012	Pokuttya Snyatyn (amateurs)	11	(2)
2012–2013	Banyliv (amateurs)	0	(0)
2013–2015	Mayak Velykyi Kuchuriv (amateurs)	0	(0)
2015–2016	Voloka (amateurs)	12	(5)
2016–2018	Bukovyna Chernivtsi	67	(4)
2018–2020	Ahrobiznes Volochysk	51	(2)
2020	Rukh Lviv	2	(1)
2021–	Ahrobiznes Volochysk	26	(0)
- * Club domestic league appearances and goals as of 16 October 2021

Ihor Vasylyovych Boychuk (Ukrainian: Ігор Васильович Бойчук; born 10 January 1994) is a professional Ukrainian football midfielder who plays for Ahrobiznes Volochysk.

== Career ==
Boychuk is a product of the Bukovyna Chernivtsi youth sportive school system in his native Chernivtsi.

After playing in the different amateur teams and spent some seasons in the lower Ukrainian professional leagues, he signed a contract with Rukh Lviv in August 2020 and made his debut for this team as a second half-time substituted player in the losing away match against FC Vorskla Poltava on 23 August 2020 in the Ukrainian Premier League.
