= FC Kharkiv =

Kharkiv
- Full name: Футбольний клуб Харків; Football Club Kharkiv
- Nickname: Bahriano-zoloti (Burgundy-goldens)
- Founded: 2016; 10 years ago
- Ground: OSC Metalist (pre-war); Arena Livyi Bereh (currently)
- Capacity: 41,307 (pre-war); 4,700 (currently)
- Owner: Volodymyr Nosov
- Chairman: Anton Ivanov
- Head coach: Mladen Bartulović
- League: Ukrainian Premier League
- 2025–26: Ukrainian Premier League, 5th of 16
- Website: https://fckharkiv.com/
Home colours	Away colours	Third colours

Football Club Kharkiv (Ukrainian: Футбольний клуб Харків), formerly FC Metalist 1925 Kharkiv (Ukrainian: ФК Металіст 1925 Харків) is a professional football club from Kharkiv, Ukraine. Founded in 2016, the club plays in the Ukrainian Premier League, the top tier of Ukrainian football after promotion from the Ukrainian First League in 2024–25. Their home stadium is the Metalist State Sports Complex, with 40,003 capacity.

Metalist Kharkiv was promoted to the Ukrainian Premier League after finishing in third place in the 2020–21 Ukrainian First League. They earned promotion on two previous occasions: placing second in the 2016–17 Ukrainian Football Amateur League and placing third in the 2017–18 Ukrainian Second League.

== History ==
The club was established in the summer of 2016 after the original club, FC Metalist Kharkiv, was refused a license by the Football Federation of Ukraine and expelled from national competitions. The process of creation of the club started the former first vice-president of the Football Federation of Ukraine, Serhiy Storozhenko. In his interview in May of 2017, Storozhenko emphasized that the club is created to be governed by local fans, for whom was created the Metalist 1925 fan club. The members of the club could be part of the governing body and governing committees of the FC Metalist 1925 Kharkiv. Storozhenko said straightforwardly that the new club has no relations to FC Metalist Kharkiv.

At first, the club was registered as Avanhard Kharkiv and had two teams, Metalist 1925 participating in the national amateur championship and Metalist Yunior in the Kharkiv Oblast championship. During the certification with the Professional Football League of Ukraine, on May 15, 2017, the club was re-registered as FC Metalist 1925 Kharkiv. Concerning naming, Serhiy Storozhenko stated that the name of Metalist is a tribute to Kharkiv as a city of workers, while the number of 1925 has two versions of how they came up with it. The first version is that 19 participants created FC Avanhard Kharkiv, while 25 is the number of footballers who can be listed for the team. The second version is that until 1925 there was a championship of cities in Ukraine, and Kharkiv was among the first champions of the Soviet Union. And it is in 1925 that the first football clubs appeared in Ukraine.

Former Metalist player like Volodymyr Linke, who is one of the founders of FC Metalist 1925 Kharkiv, became the club's general director.

In 2016, FC Metalist 1925 entered the Ukrainian Football Amateur League for the 2016–17 season where it reached the league's final. Later in the summer of 2017, it was admitted to the Ukrainian Second League.

In 2018, the club was promoted to the Ukrainian First League and, from 2021, it has played in the highest tier of Ukrainian association football – the Ukrainian Premier League.

On 1 June 2025, Metalist 1925 secured promotion to the Ukrainian Premier League from next season after a win against Livyi Bereh Kyiv on a 2–0 aggregate in the promotion-relegation play-off, and returned to the top tier after a one-year absence.

On 15 June 2026, Metalist 1925 announced an official rebranding and renaming to FC Kharkiv, starting the following season.

== Crest and colour ==
Club logo used from 2016 to 2026

FC Kharkiv colour is Maroon and Yellow previously Yellow and Dark Blue.

== Infrastructure ==
FC Kharkiv plays its games at Metalist Stadium. It has its own training site in the town of Vysokyi.

== Squad ==
=== Players ===
As of 12 September 2026

Note: Flags indicate national team as defined under FIFA eligibility rules; some limited exceptions apply. Players may hold more than one non-FIFA nationality.

No.	Pos.	Nation	Player
1	GK	UKR	Heorhiy Yermakov
5	MF	UKR	Ivan Kalyuzhnyi (captain)
6	MF	ARG	Rafael Profini
7	FW	KOS	Baton Zabërgja
8	MF	UKR	Oleksandr Yatsyk
9	FW	UKR	Denys Antyukh
10	FW	VEN	Carlos Paraco
11	FW	VEN	Sebastián Castillo (on loan from Deportivo La Guaira)
13	DF	UKR	Volodymyr Salyuk
14	FW	UKR	Ramik Hadzhyiev
16	MF	COL	Nicolás Arévalo
17	MF	UKR	Ihor Kohut

No.	Pos.	Nation	Player
18	DF	UKR	Yevhen Pavlyuk
19	MF	ALB	Ermir Rashica
23	GK	UKR	Yaroslav Protsenko
24	DF	UKR	Oleksandr Martynyuk
27	DF	UKR	Illya Krupskyi
29	DF	UKR	Artem Smolyakov (on loan from Los Angeles)
30	GK	UKR	Danylo Varakuta
31	DF	UKR	Artem Shabanov
37	DF	UKR	Valeriy Dubko
77	MF	ITA	Cauan Baptistella
91	MF	UKR	Matviy Panchenko
98	FW	NGR	Peter Itodo

=== Other players under contract ===
Note: Flags indicate national team as defined under FIFA eligibility rules; some limited exceptions apply. Players may hold more than one non-FIFA nationality.

No.	Pos.	Nation	Player

=== Out on loan ===
Note: Flags indicate national team as defined under FIFA eligibility rules; some limited exceptions apply. Players may hold more than one non-FIFA nationality.

No.	Pos.	Nation	Player
—	GK	UKR	Maksym Kovalenko (at Probiy Horodenka until 30 June 2026)
—	MF	UKR	Oleksandr Smityukh (at Dinaz Vyshhorod until 30 June 2026)

No.	Pos.	Nation	Player
—	MF	UKR	Denys Nahnoynyi (at Kudrivka until 30 June 2026)
—	FW	GHA	Raymond Owusu (at Kudrivka until 31 December 2026)

== International players ==
Had international caps for their respective countries. Players whose name is listed in bold represented their countries while playing for Kharkiv.

Ukraine

- (Ukraine) Andriy Boryachuk
- (Ukraine) Edmar
- (Ukraine) Denys Harmash
- (Ukraine) Oleksandr Horyainov
- (Ukraine) **Ivan Kalyuzhnyi**
- (Ukraine) Dmytro Kryskiv
- (Ukraine) Oleksandr Martynyuk
- (Ukraine) Artem Shabanov

Africa

- (Zambia) **Golden Mafwenta**

Europe

- (Georgia (country)) **Solomon Kvirkvelia**
- (Kosovo) **Baton Zabërgja**

== Administration and coaches ==
=== Administration ===
- Owner – LLC FC Metalist 1925 Kharkiv

=== Current staff (senior team) ===
- Head coach – (Croatia) Mladen Bartulović
- Assistant coach – (Ukraine) Maksym Tsvirenko
- Assistant coach – (Ukraine) Andriy Polunin
- Assistant coach – (Ukraine) Oleksandr Chyzhov
- Assistant coach – (Ukraine) Yevhen Shakhov
- Goalkeeping coach – (Ukraine) Serhiy Dolhanskyi
- Analysts – (Ukraine) Valentyn Yermak
- Fitness Coach – (Ukraine) Andriy Shabalin
- Fitness Coach – (Croatia) Dragan Todorovic

=== General Directors ===
- 2016–2020 Volodymyr Linke
- 2020–2023 Yaroslav Vdovenko
- 2023–2024 Andriy Niedielin
- 2024–present Anton Ivanov

=== Presidents and vice-presidents ===
- 2023–present Volodymyr Nosov
  - 2023–present Yuriy Korotun

=== Managers ===
- Oleksandr Pryzetko (16 Aug 2016 – 26 September 2017)
- Vyacheslav Khruslov (caretaker) (26 September 2017 – 28 September 2017)
- Oleksandr Ivanov (28 September 2017 – 3 May 2018)
- Serhiy Ralyuchenko (caretaker) (3 May 2018 – 8 May 2018)
- Serhiy Valyayev (8 May 2018 – 11 September 2018)
- Oleksandr Horyainov (caretaker) (11 September 2018 – 10 December 2018)
- Oleksandr Horyainov (10 December 2018 – 4 June 2019)
- Andriy Demchenko (4 June 2019 – 21 July 2020)
- Vyacheslav Khruslov (caretaker) (21 July 2020 – 21 August 2020)
- Valeriy Kriventsov (21 August 2020 – 22 October 2022)
- Edmar (caretaker) (23 October 2022 – 5 November 2023)
- Oleh Holodyuk (caretaker) (5 November 2023 – 20 December 2023)
- Viktor Skrypnyk (20 December 2023 – 28 July 2024)
- Serhiy Karpenko (caretaker) (28 July 2024 – 20 August 2024)
- (Netherlands) Patrick van Leeuwen (20 August 2024 – 18 May 2025)
- Oleksandr Chyzhov (caretaker) (20 May 2025 – 20 June 2025)
- (Croatia) Mladen Bartulović (20 June 2025 – present)

== Honours ==
- **Ukrainian First League**
  - Third place (1): 2020–21
- **Ukrainian Second League**
  - Third place (1): 2017–18
- **Ukrainian Amateur Football Championship**
  - Runners-up (1): 2016–17

== Seasons ==
Season	Div.	Pos.	Pl.	W	D	L	GS	GA	P	Domestic Cup	Other		Notes
2016–17	**4th** (Championship among amateurs)	**1**	20	13	4	3	46	18	**43**	-	LF	Lost final	Group winner, **Promoted**
2017–18	**3rd** "B" (Second League)	**2**	33	21	4	8	77	27	**67**	1/64 finals	-	-	**Promoted**
2018–19	**2nd** (First League)	**4**	28	15	6	7	35	20	**51**	1/16 finals	-	-	-
2019–20	**2nd** (First League)	**7**	30	15	6	9	44	34	**51**	1/32 finals	-	-	-
2020–21	**2nd** (First League)	**3**	30	16	8	6	36	22	**56**	1/64 finals	-	-	**Promoted**
2021–22was terminated	**1st** (Premier League)	**10**	18/30	6	1	11	17	29	**19**	1/8 finals	-	-	began on 24.02.2022 Russian invasion of Ukraine
2022–23	**1st** (Premier League)	**12**	30	6	14	10	23	42	**32**	Not played	-	-	-
2023–24	**1st** (Premier League)	**16**	30	5	8	17	32	57	**23**	1/8 finals	-	-	**Relegated to FL**
2024–25	**2nd** Gr"B" (First League)	2 /8	16	8	5	3	21	10	**29**	3rd round	-	-	Admitted to Promotion Group
2024–25	**2nd** "Promotion" (First League)	**3**/8	22	10	6	6	29	20	**36**	3rd round	-	-	**Promoted to PL** win play-off Livyi Bereh Kyiv 1:0 1:0
2025–26	**1st** (Premier League)	**5**	30	13	12	5	36	19	**51**	1/2 finals	-	-	-
2026–27	**1st** (Premier League)	9	3	1	0	2	2	4	3	1/4 finals	-	-	Rename from **Metalist 1925 Kharkiv**

== Women, reserves teams and academy ==
=== Metalist 1925-2 ===
The club created their second squad as early as 2016. At first, they were competing as Metalist Yunior.

It was announced that Metalist 1925 will be fielding its second squad in the 2024–25 Ukrainian Second League. Metalist 1925-2 would be formed based on Metalist 1925 under-19 team that competed at the UPL U-19 competitions.

=== Metalist 1925 (women) ===
Created in 2006 as Zhilstroi-1 Kharkiv (Zhytlobud-1), in 2024 the women's team from Kharkiv was fully integrated by Metalist 1925 as their women's team. Zhilstroi-1/Zhytlobud-1 is a leader of the women club's football in Ukraine.
