= Volodymyr Linke =

Ukrainian footballer (born 1958)

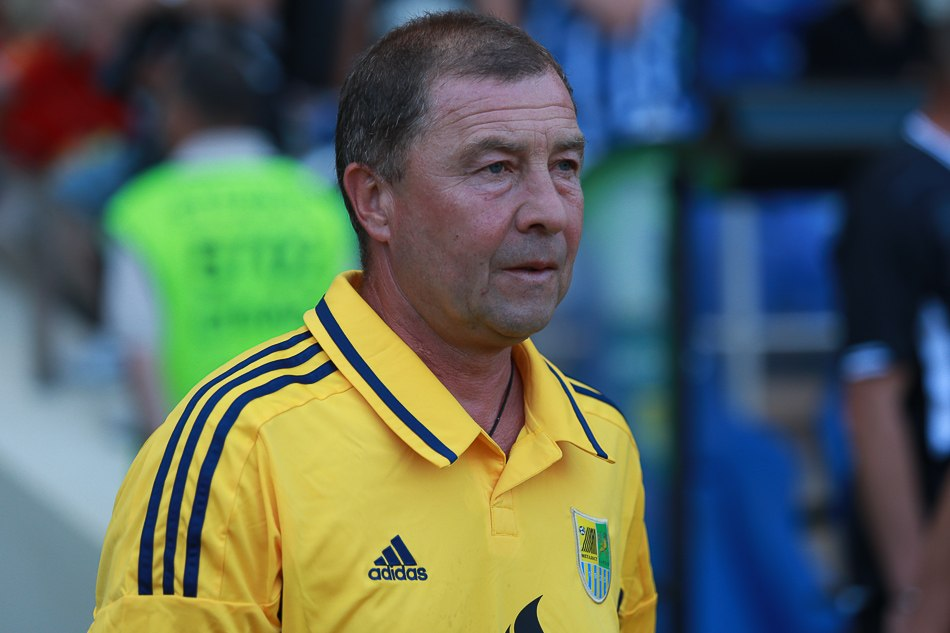
- Linke in 2013

Personal information
- Full name: Volodymyr Ivanovych Linke
- Date of birth: 27 March 1958 (age 68)
- Place of birth: Kharkiv, Ukrainian SSR
- Height: 1.70 m (5 ft 7 in)
- Position: Forward

Youth career
- 1967–1972: Metalist Kharkiv
- 1972–1976: Sports boarding school Kharkiv

Senior career*
Years	Team	Apps	(Gls)
1976–1985	Metalist Kharkiv	315	(74)
1984–1985	→ Mayak Kharkiv (loan)	8	(2)
1985–1987	Naftovyk Okhtyrka	30	(2)
1987–1991	Mayak Kharkiv	18	(2)
1991–1992	Avanhard Merefa	15	(14)
1992–1993	Mayak Kharkiv	4	(2)
1993–1994	APK Morozovsk	26	(8)
1994–1996	Metalist Kharkiv	36	(3)
1996–1997	Spartak-Bratskiy Yuzhny	32	(8)

Managerial career
- 2015–2016: Metalist Kharkiv (assistant)
- 2016–2020: Metalist 1925 Kharkiv (general director)
- * Club domestic league appearances and goals

Volodymyr Ivanovych Linke (born 27 March 1958) is a Ukrainian former professional footballer who played as a forward in his native city for Metalist Kharkiv and Mayak Kharkiv.

In 2016, he became one of the initiators of Avanhard Kharkiv that registered the revived FC Metalist 1925 Kharkiv.
