= Vyacheslav Borysenko =

Ukrainian footballer (born 2002)

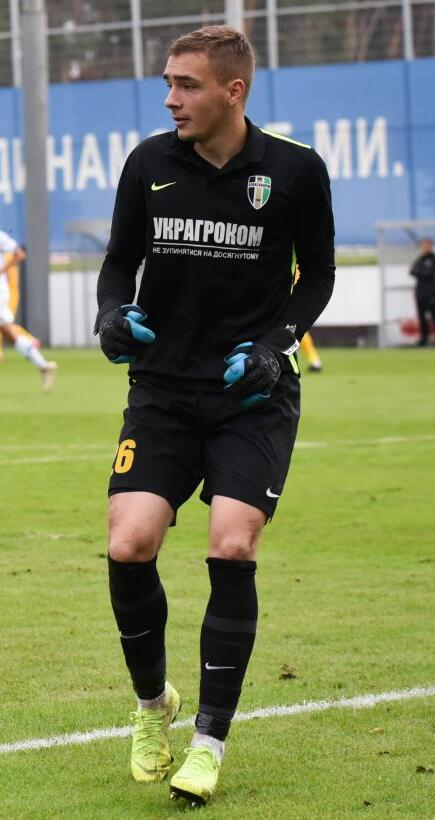
- Borysenko playing for Oleksandriya U-21 in 2020

Personal information
- Full name: Vyacheslav Vadymovych Borysenko
- Date of birth: 24 March 2002 (age 24)
- Place of birth: Zhytomyr, Ukraine
- Height: 1.91 m (6 ft 3 in)
- Position: Goalkeeper

Youth career
- 2010–2013: Feniks Zhytomyr
- 2013–2014: Dobro-Voskhod Kyiv
- 2014–2019: UFK-Karpaty Lviv

Senior career*
| Years | Team | Apps | (Gls) |
| 2019–2021 | Oleksandriya | 1 | (0) |
| 2021–2022 | FC Enerhiya Nova Kakhovka | 6 | (0) |
| 2023 | Dinaz Vyshhorod | 4 | (0) |
- * Club domestic league appearances and goals as of 1 April 2024

Vyacheslav Vadymovych Borysenko (Ukrainian: В'ячеслав Вадимович Борисенко; born 24 March 2002) is a Ukrainian professional football goalkeeper.

== Career ==
Borysenko is a product of the Feniks Zhytomyr and UFK-Karpaty Lviv academies.

From August 2019 he played for the side Oleksandriya in the Ukrainian Premier League Reserves and Under 19 Championship during four seasons. In July 2020 he was promoted to the main squad to play in the Ukrainian Premier League. Borysenko made his debut in the Ukrainian Premier League for Oleksandriya as a start squad player on 18 October 2020, playing in a winning home match against Inhulets Petrove.
