= Bohdan Myshenko =

Ukrainian footballer

Personal information
- Full name: Bohdan Oleksiyovych Myshenko
- Date of birth: 29 December 1994 (age 31)
- Place of birth: Heronymivka, Ukraine
- Height: 1.77 m (5 ft 10 in)
- Position: Midfielder

Youth career
- 2007–2012: Molod Poltava
- 2012–2014: Metalurh Donetsk

Senior career*
Years	Team	Apps	(Gls)
2014–2015	Metalurh Donetsk	9	(0)
2015–2016	Milsami Orhei	8	(0)
2016–2017	Desna Chernihiv	11	(0)
2017	Dinamo Tbilisi	14	(0)
2018–2019	Torpedo-BelAZ Zhodino	54	(12)
2020–2021	Oleksandriya	22	(3)
2021	Gomel	11	(1)
2022–2023	Lviv	19	(0)
2023	Viktoriya Sumy	14	(3)
2024–2025	UCSA Tarasivka	9	(1)
2025	ŁKS Łomża	6	(0)

International career
2015	Ukraine U21	1	(1)
- * Club domestic league appearances and goals as of 18:04, 18 June 2025 (UTC)

Bohdan Oleksiyovych Myshenko (Ukrainian: Богдан Олексійович Мишенко; born 29 December 1994) is a Ukrainian professional footballer who plays as a midfielder.

== Career ==
Myshenko is a product of the youth team systems of FC Molod Poltava. He signed a contract with FC Metalurh Donetsk in 2012. He made his debut for FC Metalurh Donetsk in a game against FC Karpaty Lviv on 3 August 2014 in the Ukrainian Premier League.

== Honours ==
ŁKS Łomża

- Polish Cup (Podlasie regionals): 2024–25
