= Oleksandr Melnyk =

Ukrainian footballer

Personal information
- Full name: Oleksandr Serhiyovych Melnyk
- Date of birth: 10 February 2000 (age 26)
- Place of birth: Kyiv, Ukraine
- Height: 1.94 m (6 ft 4 in)
- Position: Centre-back

Youth career
- 2008–2018: Dynamo Kyiv

Senior career*
Years	Team	Apps	(Gls)
2018–2019	Dynamo Kyiv	0	(0)
2018	→ Arsenal Kyiv (loan)	0	(0)
2019	→ Oleksandriya (loan)	0	(0)
2019–2023	Oleksandriya	19	(0)
2023	→ Mynai (loan)	13	(0)
2023-24	Mynai	8	(0)
2024-25	NK Veres Rivne	2	(0)
2025-26	UCSA Tarasivka	0	(0)
2026-	FC Oleksandriya	2	(0)

International career^{‡}
2016	Ukraine U17	2	(0)
- * Club domestic league appearances and goals as of 28/10/26 @ 13:53(AEST) ‡ National team caps and goals as of 7 December 2023

Oleksandr Serhiyovych Melnyk (Ukrainian: Олександр Сергійович Мельник; born 10 February 2000) is a Ukrainian professional footballer who plays as a centre-back.

== Career ==
Born in Kyiv, Melnyk is a product of his native Dynamo Kyiv academy. His first coaches were Yuriy Yeskin and Valeriy Shabelnikov.

He signed a contract with Ukrainian Premier League club Oleksandriya in July 2019 made his debut in the Ukrainian Premier League for Oleksandriya on 16 July 2020, playing as a start squad player in the winning away match against Desna Chernihiv.
