= List of Ukrainian football transfers winter 2021–22 =

This is a list of Ukrainian football transfers winter 2021–22. Only clubs in 2021–22 Ukrainian Premier League are included. Due to the Russian invasion of Ukraine FIFA allowed players from Ukrainian clubs to sign deals with the teams outside of the country until 30 June 2022. Such transfers must be registered until 7 April 2022, thus extending transfer window until this date.

== Ukrainian Premier League ==
=== Chornomorets Odesa ===
In:

No.	Pos.	Nation	Player
—	GK	UKR	Yevhen Past (from Dnipro-1)
—	DF	SWE	Doug Bergqvist (from (Sweden) Kalmar)
—	DF	UKR	Dmytro Heyko (loan return from Balkany Zorya)
—	DF	CAN	Manjrekar James (on loan from (Denmark) Vejle)
—	DF	MNE	Ilija Martinović (from (Slovenia) Maribor)
—	DF	UKR	Artem Sukhotskyi (free agent)
—	MF	UKR	Ivan Bobko (from LNZ Cherkasy)
—	MF	USA	Jorge Hernandez (from (United States) LA Galaxy II)
—	MF	UKR	Orest Kuzyk (from Rukh Lviv)
—	MF	UKR	Mykola Morozyuk (free agent)
—	MF	SLO	Rudi Požeg Vancaš (from (Slovenia) Maribor)
—	MF	BUL	Borislav Tsonev (from (Bulgaria) Levski Sofia)
—	MF	UKR	Dmytro Yusov (from (Belarus) BATE Borisov)
—	MF	BRA	Wanderson Maranhão (from (Belarus) FC Vitebsk)
—	FW	UKR	Nazariy Rusyn (loan from Dynamo Kyiv)
—	FW	BUL	Martin Petkov (from (Bulgaria) Levski Sofia)

Out:

No.	Pos.	Nation	Player
—	GK	UKR	Vladyslav Kucheruk (loan return to Dynamo Kyiv)
—	GK	UKR	Oleksiy Palamarchuk (to Hirnyk-Sport H. Plavni)
—	DF	SWE	Doug Bergqvist (on loan to (Sweden) Kalmar)
—	DF	UKR	Valeriy Dubko (loan return to Vorskla Poltava)
—	DF	UKR	Denys Kuzyk (loan return to Dynamo Kyiv)
—	DF	MNE	Ilija Martinović (on loan to (Montenegro) Dečić Tuzi)
—	DF	UKR	Danil Skorko (loan return to Dynamo Kyiv)
—	DF	UKR	Roman Vantukh (loan return to Dynamo Kyiv)
—	MF	UKR	Artur Avahimyan (to Oleksandriya)
—	MF	UKR	Bohdan Biloshevskyi (loan return to Dynamo Kyiv)
—	MF	USA	Jorge Hernandez (to (Belgium) Mechelen)
—	MF	GHA	Mohammed Kadiri (loan return to Dynamo Kyiv)
—	MF	UKR	Vadym Mashchenko (loan return to Dynamo Kyiv)
—	MF	UKR	Yaroslav Nadolskyi (loan return to Dynamo Kyiv)
—	MF	SLO	Rudi Požeg Vancaš (on loan to (Kazakhstan) FC Tobol)
—	MF	UKR	Yuriy Tlumak (loan return to Dynamo Kyiv)
—	MF	BUL	Borislav Tsonev (on loan to (Bulgaria) Slavia Sofia)
—	MF	GEO	Heorhiy Tsitaishvili (loan return to Dynamo Kyiv)
—	MF	UKR	Yevhen Smyrnyi (loan return to Dynamo Kyiv)
—	MF	GEO	Beka Vachiberadze (on loan to (Georgia (country)) Torpedo Kutaisi)
—	MF	BRA	Wanderson Maranhão (on loan to (Lithuania) FK Panevėžys)
—	FW	UKR	Vladyslav Buhay (to FC Lviv)
—	FW	UKR	Yevhen Isayenko (loan return to Dynamo Kyiv)
—	FW	BUL	Martin Petkov (to (Bulgaria) Slavia Sofia)
—	FW	UKR	Danyil Sukhoruchko (loan return to Dynamo Kyiv)
—	FW	UKR	Vladyslav Vanat (loan return to Dynamo Kyiv)

=== Desna Chernihiv ===
In:

No.	Pos.	Nation	Player
—	DF	UKR	Danyil Pus (from Desna-3 Chernihiv)
—	DF	BLR	Artem Khatskevich (from Desna-3 Chernihiv)
—	MF	UKR	Denys Demyanenko (from Desna-3 Chernihiv)
—	MF	GRE	Georgios Ermidis (from Desna-2 Chernihiv)
—	MF	UKR	Dzhilindo Bezghubchenko (from Desna-2 Chernihiv)
—	MF	UKR	Bohdan Sheiko (from Desna-2 Chernihiv)
—	MF	UKR	Serhiy Makarenko (from Desna-3 Chernihiv)
—	FW	UKR	Oleksiy Pashchenko (from Desna-2 Chernihiv)

Out:

No.	Pos.	Nation	Player
—	GK	UKR	Dmytro Sydorenko (on loan to (Poland) Izolator Boguchwała)
—	DF	UKR	Oleksiy Kovtun (to (Belarus) Rukh Brest)
—	DF	UKR	Oleksandr Safronov (on loan to (Slovenia) Nafta 1903)
—	MF	UKR	Serhiy Makarenko (to (Poland) Piast Nowa Ruda)
—	MF	UKR	Yevheniy Belych (to (Poland) Piast Nowa Ruda)
—	MF	UKR	Levan Arveladze (to (Georgia (country)) Torpedo Kutaisi)
—	MF	UKR	Serhiy Bolbat (loan return to Shakhtar Donetsk)
—	MF	UKR	Andriy Dombrovskyi (on loan to (Poland) Termalica Nieciecza)
—	MF	UKR	Vladyslav Kalitvintsev (to Oleksandriya)
—	MF	UKR	Yehor Kartushov (to Metalist Kharkiv)
—	MF	UKR	Andriy Totovytskyi (to Kolos Kovalivka)
—	MF	UKR	Vladlen Yurchenko (to (Latvia) Riga FC)
—	MF	UKR	Denys Demyanenko (to (Poland) Cosmos Nowotaniec)
—	FW	UKR	Denys Bezborodko (on loan to (Hungary) Gyirmót)
—	FW	UKR	Pylyp Budkivskyi (to Polissya Zhytomyr)

=== Dnipro-1 ===
In:

No.	Pos.	Nation	Player
—	GK	UKR	Bohdan Sarnavskyi (loan return from Kryvbas Kryvyi Rih (2020))
—	GK	UKR	Myroslav Znovenko (loan return from Nikopol)
—	DF	BRA	Gabriel Busanello (on loan from (Brazil) Chapecoense)
—	DF	UKR	Roman Vantukh (on loan from Dynamo Kyiv)
—	MF	BRA	Vagner Gonçalves (loan return from Kryvbas Kryvyi Rih (2020))
—	FW	BRA	Bill (from (Brazil) Flamengo)
—	FW	ESP	Marc Gual (from (Spain) Alcorcón)
—	FW	BRA	Felipe Pires (from (Portugal) Moreirense)
—	FW	UKR	Oleksiy Khoblenko (loan return from Kryvbas Kryvyi Rih)

Out:

No.	Pos.	Nation	Player
—	GK	ROU	Valentin Cojocaru (on loan to (Netherlands) Feyenoord)
—	GK	UKR	Yevhen Past (to Chornomorets Odesa)
—	GK	UKR	Bohdan Sarnavskyi (on loan to (Israel) Hapoel Tel Aviv)
—	GK	UKR	Myroslav Znovenko (on loan to VPK-Ahro Shevchenkivka)
—	DF	BRA	Gabriel Busanello (loan return to (Brazil) Chapecoense)
—	DF	UKR	Vladyslav Dubinchak (loan return to Dynamo Kyiv)
—	DF	POR	Nélson Monte (on loan to (Spain) Almería)
—	MF	UKR	Arseniy Batahov (on loan to Polissya Zhytomyr)
—	MF	ARG	Francisco Di Franco (on loan to (Argentina) Atlético Tucumán)
—	MF	CRO	Neven Đurasek (loan return to (Croatia) Dinamo Zagreb)
—	MF	UKR	Danylo Ihnatenko (loan return to Shakhtar Donetsk)
—	MF	BRA	Vagner Gonçalves (to (Georgia (country)) Dila Gori)
—	FW	BRA	Bill (loan return to (Brazil) Flamengo)
—	FW	BRA	Bill (on loan to (Brazil) Sport Recife)
—	FW	CRO	Mario Ćuže (loan return to (Croatia) Dinamo Zagreb)
—	FW	ESP	Marc Gual (on loan to (Poland) Jagiellonia Białystok)
—	FW	UKR	Oleksiy Khoblenko (to Kryvbas Kryvyi Rih)
—	FW	BRA	Felipe Pires (on loan to (Netherlands) ADO Den Haag)
—	FW	UKR	Nazariy Rusyn (loan return to Dynamo Kyiv)

=== Dynamo Kyiv ===
In:

No.	Pos.	Nation	Player
—	GK	UKR	Vladyslav Kucheruk (loan return from Chornomorets Odesa)
—	DF	UKR	Alan Aussi (loan return from (Belarus) Torpedo-BelAZ Zhodino)
—	DF	UKR	Vladyslav Dubinchak (loan return from SC Dnipro-1)
—	DF	UKR	Volodymyr Kostevych (loan return from Rukh Lviv)
—	DF	UKR	Denys Kuzyk (loan return from Chornomorets Odesa)
—	DF	UKR	Danil Skorko (loan return from Chornomorets Odesa)
—	DF	UKR	Roman Vantukh (loan return from Chornomorets Odesa)
—	MF	UKR	Bohdan Biloshevskyi (loan return from Chornomorets Odesa)
—	MF	GHA	Mohammed Kadiri (loan return from Chornomorets Odesa)
—	MF	UKR	Vadym Mashchenko (loan return from Chornomorets Odesa)
—	MF	UKR	Yaroslav Nadolskyi (loan return from Chornomorets Odesa)
—	MF	LUX	Gerson Rodrigues (loan return from (France) Troyes)
—	MF	UKR	Yevhen Smyrnyi (loan return from Chornomorets Odesa)
—	MF	UKR	Yuriy Tlumak (loan return from Chornomorets Odesa)
—	MF	GEO	Heorhiy Tsitaishvili (loan return from Chornomorets Odesa)
—	FW	UKR	Yevhen Isayenko (loan return from Chornomorets Odesa)
—	FW	UKR	Nazariy Rusyn (loan return from SC Dnipro-1)
—	FW	UKR	Danyil Sukhoruchko (loan return from Chornomorets Odesa)
—	FW	UKR	Vladyslav Vanat (loan return from Chornomorets Odesa)

Out:

No.	Pos.	Nation	Player
—	DF	UKR	Alan Aussi (on loan to Veres Rivne)
—	DF	POL	Tomasz Kędziora (on loan to (Poland) Lech Poznań)
—	DF	UKR	Denys Kuzyk (on loan to Kolos Kovalivka)
—	DF	UKR	Vitaliy Mykolenko (to (England) Everton)
—	DF	UKR	Artem Shabanov (to (Hungary) Fehérvár)
—	DF	UKR	Danil Skorko (to Zorya Luhansk)
—	DF	UKR	Roman Vantukh (on loan to Dnipro-1)
—	MF	UKR	Bohdan Biloshevskyi (on loan to Oleksandriya)
—	MF	URU	Carlos de Pena (to (Brazil) Internacional)
—	MF	GHA	Mohammed Kadiri (on loan to (Hungary) Budapest Honvéd)
—	MF	UKR	Bohdan Lyednyev (on loan to (Hungary) Fehérvár)
—	MF	LUX	Gerson Rodrigues (on loan to (Turkey) Eyüpspor)
—	MF	UKR	Yuriy Tlumak (to Zorya Luhansk)
—	MF	GEO	Heorhiy Tsitaishvili (on loan to (Poland) Wisła Kraków)
—	MF	SLO	Benjamin Verbič (on loan to (Poland) Legia Warsaw)
—	FW	UKR	Yevhen Isayenko (on loan to Kolos Kovalivka)
—	FW	BEL	Ibrahim Kargbo Jr. (on loan to (Slovenia) Celje)
—	FW	VEN	Eric Ramírez (on loan to (Spain) Sporting de Gijón)
—	FW	UKR	Nazariy Rusyn (loan to Chornomorets Odesa)
—	FW	BLR	Ilya Shkurin (loan return to (Russia) CSKA Moscow)
—	FW	UKR	Vladyslav Supryaha (on loan to (Italy) Sampdoria)
—	FW	BRA	Vitinho (on loan to (Brazil) Athletico Paranaense)

=== Inhulets Petrove ===
In:

No.	Pos.	Nation	Player
—	GK	UKR	Andriy Klishchuk (from Hirnyk-Sport H. Plavni)
—	GK	UKR	Danylo Kucher (from FC Mynai)
—	DF	MDA	Oleksandr Kucherenko (from Volyn Lutsk)
—	DF	UKR	Taras Sakiv (from Kolos Kovalivka)
—	DF	BRA	William (from (Belarus) Rukh Brest)
—	MF	NED	Rodney Antwi (free agent)
—	MF	UKR	Andriy Bliznichenko (free agent)
—	MF	MDA	Dmitri Mandrîcenco (from (Georgia (country)) Saburtalo Tbilisi)
—	MF	UKR	Vladyslav Klymenko (from FC Mariupol)
—	MF	UKR	Suleyman Seytkhalilov (loan return from Kremin Kremenchuk)

Out:

No.	Pos.	Nation	Player
—	GK	UKR	Bohdan Shust (retired)
—	GK	UKR	Yevhen Halchuk (to FC Mariupol)
—	DF	BRA	William (on loan to (Belarus) Dinamo Minsk)
—	MF	NED	Rodney Antwi (on loan to (Norway) Jerv)
—	MF	CRO	Mladen Bartulović (retired)
—	MF	UKR	Illya Kovalenko (to LNZ Cherkasy)
—	MF	UKR	Vladyslav Lupashko (retired)
—	MF	MDA	Dmitri Mandrîcenco (on loan to (Poland) Motor Lublin)
—	MF	UKR	Vladyslav Sharay (to Alians Lypova Dolyna)
—	MF	UKR	Andriy Yakymiv
—	FW	NGR	Stephen Gopey (to (Kuwait) Al-Arabi)
—	FW	UKR	Mykhaylo Plokhotnyuk (to (Romania) Politehnica Iași)

=== Kolos Kovalivka ===
In:

No.	Pos.	Nation	Player
—	GK	UKR	Yevhen Kucherenko (loan return from Podillya Khmelnytskyi)
—	FW	UKR	Denys Kuzyk (on loan from Dynamo Kyiv)
—	MF	UKR	Stanislav Morarenko (loan return from Podillya Khmelnytskyi)
—	MF	UKR	Yevhen Morozko (loan return from Polissya Zhytomyr)
—	MF	UKR	Serhiy Myakushko (from FC Mynai)
—	MF	UKR	Pavlo Orikhovskyi (from Rukh Lviv)
—	MF	UKR	Stanislav Sorokin (loan return from Lviv)
—	MF	UKR	Andriy Totovytskyi (from Desna Chernihiv)
—	FW	UKR	Yevhen Isayenko (on loan from Dynamo Kyiv)
—	FW	UKR	Stanislav Koval (loan return from Podillya Khmelnytskyi)

Out:

No.	Pos.	Nation	Player
—	GK	UKR	Yevhen Kucherenko (on loan to (Kazakhstan) FC Aksu)
—	DF	UKR	Vitaliy Havrysh (retired)
—	DF	BLR	Aleksandr Pavlovets (loan return to (Russia) FC Rostov)
—	DF	UKR	Kyrylo Petrov (on loan to (Poland) Korona Kielce)
—	DF	UKR	Oleksiy Malaki (on loan to Hirnyk-Sport H. Plavni)
—	DF	UKR	Taras Sakiv (to Inhulets Petrove)
—	DF	BLR	Nikolay Zolotov (on loan to (France) Bastia)
—	MF	BRA	Diego Carioca (on loan to (Poland) Jagiellonia Białystok)
—	MF	SEN	Mamadou Danfa (to (North Macedonia) Shkupi)
—	MF	UKR	Denys Kostyshyn (to Oleksandriya)
—	MF	UKR	Vyacheslav Churko (on loan to (Hungary) Mezőkövesd)
—	MF	CMR	Alvaro Ngamba (on loan to (Finland) Mariehamn)
—	MF	UKR	Yevhen Zadoya
—	MF	UKR	Stanislav Sorokin (Loan to (Georgia (country)) Shevardeni-1906 Tbilisi)
—	FW	AZE	Anatoliy Nuriyev (on loan to (Azerbaijan) Sumgayit)
—	FW	BRA	Renan Oliveira (on loan to (Lithuania) Žalgiris)
—	FW	GEO	Nika Sichinava (on loan to (Finland) KuPS)

=== Lviv ===
In:

No.	Pos.	Nation	Player
—	GK	UKR	Ivan Ponomarenko (from Bukovyna Chernivtsi)
—	DF	FRA	Issiar Dramé (from (United States) New York Red Bulls)
—	DF	UKR	Nazariy Muravskyi (from Shakhtar Donetsk)
—	MF	UGA	Farouk Miya (free agent)
—	MF	UKR	Bohdan Myshenko (from (Belarus) Gomel)
—	MF	UKR	Oleksandr Vasylyev (from (Belarus) Gomel)
—	MF	BRA	Welves (loan return from (Azerbaijan) Zira)
—	FW	UKR	Vladyslav Buhay (from Chornomorets Odesa)
—	FW	BRA	Pernambuco (loan return from (Norway) Bodø/Glimt)
—	FW	BRA	Filipe Pachtmann (loan return from (Azerbaijan) Zira)

Out:

No.	Pos.	Nation	Player
—	GK	UKR	Orest Kostyk (on loan to (Lithuania) FK Jonava)
—	DF	LUX	Enes Mahmutovic (to (Bulgaria) CSKA Sofia)
—	MF	CRO	Frane Čirjak (to (Bulgaria) Lokomotiv 1929 Sofia)
—	MF	UKR	Vladyslav Khamelyuk (to (Belarus) Dynamo Brest)
—	MF	UKR	Stanislav Sorokin (loan return to Kolos Kovalivka)
—	MF	UKR	Ivan Brikner (to Alians Lypova Dolyna)
—	MF	BRA	Alvaro (on loan to (Georgia (country)) Dila Gori)
—	MF	BRA	Welves (on loan to (Estonia) Nõmme Kalju)
—	MF	UKR	Ivan Brikner (to (Kazakhstan) Zhetysu)
—	FW	GHA	Ernest Antwi (on loan to (Saudi Arabia) Najran SC)
—	FW	BRA	China (on loan to (Kazakhstan) Aktobe)
—	FW	BRA	Pernambuco (on loan to (Moldova) Sheriff Tiraspol)

=== Mariupol ===
In:

No.	Pos.	Nation	Player
—	GK	UKR	Yevhen Halchuk (from Inhulets Petrove)
—	DF	UKR	Oleksiy Bykov (loan return from (Bulgaria) Lokomotiv Plovdiv)
—	DF	UKR	Eduard Kozik (on loan from Shakhtar Donetsk)
—	MF	UKR	Illya Hulko (on loan from Shakhtar Donetsk)
—	MF	UKR	Danylo Litovchenko (from Yarud Mariupol)
—	MF	UKR	Andriy Vyskrebentsev (loan return from Uzhhorod)
—	FW	UKR	Danylo Honcharuk (on loan from Shakhtar Donetsk)

Out:

No.	Pos.	Nation	Player
—	GK	UKR	Mykyta Turbayevskyi (loan return to Shakhtar Donetsk)
—	GK	UKR	Oleh Kudryk (to Polissya Zhytomyr)
—	DF	CRO	Petar Bosančić (to (Bosnia and Herzegovina) Široki Brijeg)
—	DF	UKR	Oleksiy Bykov (on loan to (Iceland) KA)
—	DF	UKR	Oleksandr Drambayev (loan return to Shakhtar Donetsk)
—	DF	UKR	Mark Mampassi (loan return to Shakhtar Donetsk)
—	DF	UKR	Stanislav Mykytsey
—	DF	UKR	Oleh Ocheretko (loan return to Shakhtar Donetsk)
—	DF	UKR	Danylo Udod (loan return to Shakhtar Donetsk)
—	MF	UKR	Maksym Chekh (loan return to Shakhtar Donetsk)
—	MF	UKR	Illya Hulko (loan return to Shakhtar Donetsk)
—	MF	UKR	Oleksiy Kashchuk (loan return to Shakhtar Donetsk)
—	MF	UKR	Mykhaylo Khromey (loan return to Shakhtar Donetsk)
—	MF	UKR	Vladyslav Klymenko (to Inhulets Petrove)
—	MF	UKR	Artur Mykytyshyn (loan return to Shakhtar Donetsk)
—	MF	UKR	Mykyta Peterman (on loan to (Poland) Zagłębie Sosnowiec)
—	MF	UKR	Dmytro Topalov (loan return to Shakhtar Donetsk)
—	MF	UKR	Denys Shostak (loan return to Shakhtar Donetsk)
—	MF	MKD	Stefan Spirovski (to (Hungary) MTK Budapest)
—	MF	UKR	Andriy Vyskrebentsev (to (Belarus) FC Slutsk)
—	FW	UKR	Andriy Kulakov (loan return to Shakhtar Donetsk)
—	FW	UKR	Bohdan Viunnyk (loan return from Shakhtar Donetsk)

=== Metalist 1925 Kharkiv ===
In:

No.	Pos.	Nation	Player
—	DF	UKR	Mykyta Bezuhlyi (from Obolon Kyiv)
—	MF	UKR	Denys Ndukve (loan return from Kramatorsk)
—	MF	UKR	Dmytro Kapinus (on loan from Shakhtar Donetsk)
—	FW	UKR	Valeriy Blazhko (loan return from Kramatorsk)

Out:

No.	Pos.	Nation	Player
—	DF	BIH	Amar Kvakić (on loan to (Austria) Floridsdorfer AC)
—	DF	GEO	Solomon Kvirkvelia (to (Georgia (country)) FC Gagra)
—	DF	UKR	Artur Zapadnya (to (Kazakhstan) Maktaaral)
—	MF	BRA	Derek (to (Brazil) Chapecoense)
—	MF	BRA	Fabinho (on loan to (Brazil) Ponte Preta)
—	MF	UKR	Oleh Holodyuk
—	MF	UKR	Dmytro Kapinus (loan return to Shakhtar Donetsk)
—	MF	UKR	Dmytro Kryskiv (loan return to Shakhtar Donetsk)
—	MF	UKR	Yevhen Protasov (to (Lithuania) Sūduva)
—	FW	BRA	Marlyson (loan return to (Brazil) Figueirense)
—	FW	UKR	Vladyslav Ostrovskyi (to (Spain) CD Lugo)

=== Mynai ===
In:

No.	Pos.	Nation	Player
—	GK	UKR	Oleksandr Bandura (from Rukh Lviv)
—	DF	UKR	Oleksandr Aksyonov (from FC Uzhhorod)
—	DF	UKR	Ihor Duts (from (Kazakhstan) Okzhetpes)
—	DF	CRO	Dominik Mihaljević (from (Slovenia) Tabor Sežana)
—	DF	UKR	Yevhen Yefremov (from (Lithuania) Sūduva)
—	MF	SLO	Lovro Grajfoner (from (Cyprus) Akritas Chlorakas)
—	MF	UKR	Dmytro Kasimov (from Obolon Kyiv)
—	MF	UKR	Vladyslav Naumets (from (Greece) PAS Giannina)
—	FW	UKR	Yuriy Kolomoyets (from Polissya Zhytomyr)

Out:

No.	Pos.	Nation	Player
—	GK	UKR	Danylo Kucher (to Inhulets Petrove)
—	DF	CRO	Dominik Mihaljević ((on loan?) to (Croatia) Jarun Zagreb)
—	DF	UKR	Andriy Semenko
—	DF	UKR	Bohdan Veklyak (to Metalurh Zaporizhzhia)
—	MF	UKR	Dmytro Bilonoh (loan return to Metalist Kharkiv)
—	MF	UKR	Roman Bodnya
—	MF	UKR	Serhiy Myakushko (to Kolos Kovalivka)
—	MF	UKR	Oleksandr Petrusenko (to (Hungary) Budapest Honvéd)
—	FW	AZE	Rustam Akhmedzade (to (Azerbaijan) Qarabağ)
—	FW	UKR	Edvard Kobak (loan return to Shakhtar Donetsk)
—	FW	UKR	Ivan Stankovych (on loan to FC Uzhhorod)

=== Oleksandriya ===
In:

No.	Pos.	Nation	Player
—	DF	UKR	Valeriy Bondarenko (on loan from Shakhtar Donetsk)
—	MF	UKR	Denys Pidruchnyi (loan return from Kramatorsk)
—	MF	UKR	Artur Avahimyan (from Chornomorets Odesa)
—	MF	UKR	Bohdan Biloshevskyi (on loan from Dynamo Kyiv)
—	MF	UKR	Vladyslav Kalitvintsev (from Desna Chernihiv)
—	MF	UKR	Denys Kostyshyn (from Kolos Kovalivka)

Out:

No.	Pos.	Nation	Player
—	DF	UKR	Hlib Bukhal (to Kryvbas Kryvyi Rih)
—	DF	LAT	Kaspars Dubra (to (Latvia) RFS)
—	DF	MLI	Bourama Fomba (to (Belarus) FC Minsk)
—	DF	UKR	Ihor Kyryukhantsev (loan return to Shakhtar Donetsk)
—	MF	UKR	Ivan Kalyuzhnyi (on loan to (Iceland) Keflavík)
—	MF	UKR	Maksym Radchenko (on loan to (Hungary) MTK Budapest)
—	FW	UKR	Andriy Novikov (to LNZ Cherkasy)
—	FW	ARG	Claudio Spinelli (loan return to (Italy) Genoa)

=== Rukh Lviv ===
In:

No.	Pos.	Nation	Player
—	GK	UKR	Viktor Babichyn (loan return from VPK-Ahro Shevchenkivka)
—	DF	SEN	Elhadji Pape Diaw (from (Lithuania) Žalgiris)
—	DF	NED	Lassana Faye (free agent)
—	MF	BRA	Edson (from (Brazil) Bahia)
—	MF	UKR	Ivan Lytvynenko (loan return from VPK-Ahro Shevchenkivka)
—	MF	FRA	Ange-Freddy Plumain (from (Turkey) Samsunspor)
—	MF	ENG	Viv Solomon-Otabor (from (Scotland) St Johnstone)

Out:

No.	Pos.	Nation	Player
—	GK	UKR	Oleksandr Bandura (to FC Mynai)
—	DF	SEN	Elhadji Pape Diaw (on loan to (Poland) Arka Gdynia)
—	DF	UKR	Roman Hahun
—	DF	UKR	Volodymyr Kostevych (loan return to Dynamo Kyiv)
—	DF	SRB	Miloš Stamenković (to (Kazakhstan) Akzhayik)
—	MF	BRA	Edson (on loan to (Brazil) Atlético Goianiense)
—	MF	UKR	Andriy Kukharuk
—	MF	UKR	Orest Kuzyk (to Chornomorets Odesa)
—	MF	UKR	Pavlo Orikhovskyi (to Kolos Kovalivka)
—	MF	FRA	Ange-Freddy Plumain (on loan to (Israel) Hapoel Tel Aviv)
—	MF	BRA	Talles (on loan to (Finland) KuPS)
—	FW	UKR	Andriy Boryachuk (loan return to Shakhtar Donetsk)
—	FW	CAN	Osaze De Rosario

=== Shakhtar Donetsk ===
In:

No.	Pos.	Nation	Player
—	GK	UKR	Mykyta Turbayevskyi (loan return from Mariupol)
—	DF	UKR	Valeriy Bondarenko (loan return from Vorskla Poltava)
—	DF	UKR	Oleksandr Drambayev (loan return from FC Mariupol)
—	DF	UKR	Ihor Kyryukhantsev (loan return from Oleksandriya)
—	DF	UKR	Mark Mampassi (loan return from Mariupol)
—	DF	BRA	Vinicius Tobias (from (Brazil) Internacional)
—	DF	UKR	Danylo Udod (loan return from FC Mariupol)
—	MF	UKR	Maksym Chekh (loan return from FC Mariupol)
—	MF	UKR	Illya Hulko (loan return from Mariupol)
—	MF	UKR	Danylo Ihnatenko (loan return from SC Dnipro-1)
—	MF	UKR	Oleksiy Kashchuk (loan return from Mariupol)
—	MF	UKR	Dmytro Kapinus (loan return from Metalist 1925 Kharkiv)
—	MF	UKR	Mykhaylo Khromey (loan return from Mariupol)
—	MF	UKR	Dmytro Kryskiv (loan return from Metalist 1925 Kharkiv)
—	MF	UKR	Andriy Kulakov (loan return from Mariupol)
—	MF	UKR	Artur Mykytyshyn (loan return from Mariupol)
—	MF	UKR	Dmytro Topalov (loan return from Mariupol)
—	MF	UKR	Serhiy Bolbat (loan return from Desna Chernihiv)
—	MF	UKR	Oleh Ocheretko (loan return from Mariupol)
—	MF	UKR	Denys Shostak (loan return from FC Mariupol)
—	FW	UKR	Andriy Boryachuk (loan return from Rukh Lviv)
—	FW	UKR	Edvard Kobak (loan return from FC Mynai)
—	FW	BRA	David Neres (from (Netherlands) Ajax)
—	MF	UKR	Denys Svityukha (loan return from Mariupol)
—	FW	UKR	Vladyslav Vakula (loan return from Vorskla Poltava)
—	FW	UKR	Bohdan Viunnyk (loan return from FC Mariupol)

Out:

No.	Pos.	Nation	Player
—	GK	UKR	Mykyta Turbayevskyi (on loan to (Croatia) Lokomotiva Zagreb)
—	DF	UKR	Mark Mampassi (to (Russia) Lokomotiv Moscow)
—	DF	UKR	Valeriy Bondarenko (on loan to Oleksandriya)
—	DF	UKR	Eduard Kozik (on loan to FC Mariupol)
—	DF	UKR	Nazariy Muravskyi (to FC Lviv)
—	DF	BRA	Vinicius Tobias (on loan to (Spain) Real Madrid Castilla)
—	DF	BRA	Vitão (on loan to (Brazil) Internacional)
—	MF	BRA	Alan Patrick (to (Brazil) Internacional)
—	MF	UKR	Oleksiy Kashchuk (loan to (Azerbaijan) Sabah FC)
—	MF	UKR	Danylo Ihnatenko (on loan to (France) Bordeaux)
—	MF	UKR	Illya Hulko (on loan to FC Mariupol)
—	MF	UKR	Illya Hulko (on loan to (Croatia) Lokomotiva Zagreb)
—	MF	UKR	Dmytro Kapinus (on loan to Metalist 1925 Kharkiv)
—	MF	UKR	Oleksiy Kashchuk (on loan to (Azerbaijan) Sabah)
—	MF	UKR	Yevhen Konoplyanka (to (Poland) Cracovia)
—	MF	UKR	Andriy Kulakov (ot loan to (Poland) Tuzlaspor)
—	MF	UKR	Marlos (to (Brazil) Athletico Paranaense)
—	MF	BRA	Maycon (on loan to (Brazil) Corinthians)
—	MF	UKR	Artur Mykytyshyn (on loan to (Hungary) III. Kerületi)
—	MF	BRA	Tetê (on loan to (France) Lyon)
—	FW	BRA	Dentinho (to (Brazil) Ceará)
—	FW	UKR	Danylo Honcharuk (on loan to FC Mariupol)
—	FW	UKR	Edvard Kobak (on loan to (Croatia) Dubrava Zagreb)
—	FW	UKR	Júnior Moraes (to (Brazil) Corinthians)
—	FW	UKR	Danylo Sikan (on loan to (Germany) Hansa Rostock)
—	MF	UKR	Denys Svityukha (on loan to (Spain) Lleida Esportiu)
—	FW	UKR	Vladyslav Vakula (on loan to Polissya Zhytomyr)
—	FW	UKR	Bohdan Viunnyk (on loan to (Switzerland) FC Zürich)

=== Veres Rivne ===
In:

No.	Pos.	Nation	Player
—	GK	UKR	Vadym Yushchyshyn (loan return from Uzhhorod)
—	DF	UKR	Alan Aussi (on loan from Dynamo Kyiv)
—	DF	ARM	Zhirayr Margaryan (from (Armenia) Ararat Yerevan)
—	MF	EST	Vladislav Kreida (on loan from (Estonia) Flora)
—	FW	UKR	Mykola Hayduchyk (loan return from Uzhhorod)
—	FW	UKR	Dmytro Povoroznyuk

Out:

No.	Pos.	Nation	Player
—	GK	UKR	Maksym Babiychuk (to FC Kramatorsk)
—	DF	ARM	Zhirayr Margaryan (on loan to (Armenia) Urartu Yerevan)
—	DF	UKR	Dmytro Nyemchaninov (to Peremoha Dnipro)
—	MF	MDA	Mihail Ghecev (on loan to (Moldova) Sfîntul Gheorghe)
—	MF	EST	Vladislav Kreida (loan return to (Estonia) Flora)
—	MF	UKR	Vitaliy Tymofiyenko (to Peremoha Dnipro)
—	FW	UKR	Robert Hehedosh (to Peremoha Dnipro)

=== Vorskla Poltava ===
In:

No.	Pos.	Nation	Player
—	DF	UKR	Andriy Batsula (from (Belarus) Dinamo Minsk)
—	DF	UKR	Valeriy Dubko (loan return from Chornomorets Odesa)
—	DF	MKD	Gjoko Zajkov (from (Bulgaria) Levski Sofia)
—	MF	BRA	Luizão (loan return from (Brazil) Bahia)
—	MF	EST	Bogdan Vaštšuk (on loan from (Estonia) Levadia Tallinn)
—	FW	UKR	Oleksandr Kozhevnikov (loan return from Hirnyk-Sport Horishni Plavni)

Out:

No.	Pos.	Nation	Player
—	DF	UKR	Valeriy Bondarenko (loan return to Shakhtar Donetsk)
—	DF	UKR	Valeriy Dubko (to Zorya Luhansk)
—	DF	MLI	Ibrahim Kane (on loan to (China) Qingdao Hainiu)
—	DF	UKR	Bohdan Kushnirenko (to Polissya Zhytomyr)
—	DF	UKR	Yevhen Pavlyuk (on loan to Kryvbas Kryvyi Rih (2020))
—	DF	EST	Joonas Tamm (on loan to (Estonia) Flora Tallinn)
—	DF	GHA	Najeeb Yakubu (on loan to (Spain) CD Lugo)
—	DF	MKD	Gjoko Zajkov (on loan to (Bulgaria) Slavia Sofia)
—	MF	BRA	Luizão (to (Poland) Radomiak Radom)
—	MF	CRO	David Puclin (on loan to (Netherlands) ADO Den Haag)
—	MF	LUX	Olivier Thill (on loan to (Turkey) Eyüpspor)
—	MF	LUX	Vincent Thill (on loan to (Sweden) Örebro)
—	MF	EST	Bogdan Vaštšuk (loan return to (Estonia) Levadia Tallinn)
—	FW	UKR	Aderinsola Eseola
—	FW	UKR	Oleksandr Kozhevnikov (to (Estonia) Narva Trans)
—	FW	TAN	Yohana Mkomola (on loan to Hirnyk-Sport H. Plavni)
—	FW	CRO	Ivan Pešić (to (Belarus) Dinamo Minsk)
—	FW	BRA	Lucas Rangel (on loan to (Azerbaijan) Sabah)
—	FW	UKR	Vladyslav Vakula (loan return to Shakhtar Donetsk)

=== Zorya Luhansk ===
In:

No.	Pos.	Nation	Player
—	DF	UKR	Oleh Danchenko (on loan from (Greece) AEK Athens)
—	DF	UKR	Valeriy Dubko (from Vorskla Poltava)
—	DF	UKR	Tymofiy Sukhar (loan return from VPK-Ahro Shevchenkivka)
—	DF	UKR	Danil Skorko (from Dynamo Kyiv)
—	MF	UKR	Yuriy Tlumak (from Dynamo Kyiv)
—	FW	UKR	Abdulla Abdullayev (free agent)

Out:

No.	Pos.	Nation	Player
—	DF	CRO	Lovro Cvek (to (Romania) CFR Cluj)
—	DF	MKD	Agron Rufati (to (Romania) Academica Clinceni)
—	MF	UKR	Vladyslav Kocherhin (to (Poland) Raków Częstochowa)
—	FW	BRA	Cristian (on loan to (Brazil) Caxias)
—	FW	BRA	Guilherme Smith (on loan to (Portugal) Braga)
—	FW	IRI	Allahyar Sayyadmanesh (loan return to (Turkey) Fenerbahçe)
—	FW	IRI	Shahab Zahedi (on loan to (Hungary) Puskás Akadémia)

== Ukrainian First League ==
=== Ahrobiznes Volochysk ===
In:

No.	Pos.	Nation	Player
—	MF	UKR	Serhiy Rusyan (from Chaika)
—	MF	UKR	Denys Byelousov (from Kremin Kremenchuk)
—	MF	UKR	Renat Mochulyak (from Livyi Bereh Kyiv)
—	FW	UKR	Oleksandr Apanchuk (from Dinaz Vyshhorod)

Out:

No.	Pos.	Nation	Player
—	DF	UKR	Arsen Slotyuk
—	MF	UKR	Ruslan Zubkov (on loan to (Poland) Ruch Chorzów)
—	FW	UKR	Serhiy Petrov
—	FW	UKR	Bohdan Semenets
—	FW	UKR	Yuriy Zakharkiv

=== Alians Lypova Dolyna ===
In:

No.	Pos.	Nation	Player
—	MF	UKR	Ivan Brikner (from Lviv)
—	FW	UKR	Vladyslav Sharay (from Inhulets Petrove)

Out:

No.	Pos.	Nation	Player

=== Hirnyk-Sport Horishni Plavni ===
In:

No.	Pos.	Nation	Player
—	GK	UKR	Oleksiy Palamarchuk (from Chornomorets Odesa)
—	DF	UKR	Oleksiy Malaki
—	MF	UKR	Vladyslav Roslyakov (from Mykolaiv)
—	FW	UKR	Vladyslav Hromenko (from to Rubikon Kyiv)
—	FW	TAN	Yohana Mkomola (on loan from Vorskla Poltava)

Out:

No.	Pos.	Nation	Player Andriy Klishchuk
—	GK	UKR	Andriy Klishchuk (to Inhulets Petrove)
—	FW	UKR	Oleksandr Kozhevnikov (loan return to Vorskla Poltava)

=== Kramatorsk ===
In:

No.	Pos.	Nation	Player

Out:

No.	Pos.	Nation	Player
—	DF	UKR	Artem Kozlov (to Chaika Petropavlivska Borshchahivka)
—	DF	UKR	Oleksandr Medvedyev
—	DF	UKR	Ruslan Zubkov (to Ahrobiznes Volochysk)
—	MF	UKR	Marat Daudov
—	MF	UKR	Oleksiy Helovani
—	MF	UKR	Denys Ndukve (loan return to Metalist 1925 Kharkiv)
—	MF	UKR	Denys Pidruchnyi (loan return to Oleksandriya)
—	MF	UKR	Yevhen Troyanovskyi
—	FW	UKR	Valeriy Blazhko (loan return to Metalist 1925 Kharkiv)

=== Kremin Kremenchuk ===
In:

No.	Pos.	Nation	Player

Out:

No.	Pos.	Nation	Player
—	GK	UKR	Vitaliy Myrnyi
—	GK	UKR	Denys Starchenko
—	DF	UKR	Bohdan Bychkov
—	DF	UKR	Oleksandr Holovko
—	DF	UKR	Valeriy Kureliekh
—	DF	UKR	Vladyslav Sydorenko
—	MF	UKR	Maksym Averyanov
—	MF	UKR	Vitaliy Boyko
—	MF	UKR	Ihor Koshman
—	MF	UKR	Vyacheslav Orel
—	MF	UKR	Suleyman Seytkhalilov (loan return to Inhulets Petrove)
—	FW	UKR	Serhiy Bilous
—	FW	UKR	Denys Byelousov (to Ahrobiznes Volochysk)
—	FW	UKR	Yevhen Murashov

=== Kryvbas Kryvyi Rih ===
In:

No.	Pos.	Nation	Player
—	GK	UKR	Dmytro Chernysh (loan return from Lyubomyr Stavyshche)
—	DF	UKR	Hlib Bukhal (from Oleksandriya)
—	DF	UKR	Yevhen Pavlyuk (on loan from Vorskla Poltava)
—	DF	UKR	Ihor Kotsyumaka (loan return from Peremoha Dnipro)
—	DF	UKR	Ivan Semenikhin (loan return from Vovchansk)
—	MF	UKR	Maksym Pyrohov (loan return from (Moldova) Sfîntul Gheorghe)
—	FW	UKR	Oleksiy Khoblenko (from Dnipro-1)
—	FW	UKR	Yevheniy Nikolashyn (loan return from Lyubomyr Stavyshche)

Out:

No.	Pos.	Nation	Player
—	GK	UKR	Bohdan Sarnavskyi (loan return to Dnipro-1)
—	DF	UKR	Dmytro Fatyeyev (to Livyi Bereh Kyiv)
—	DF	GEO	Zurab Gigashvili (to (Georgia (country)) Telavi)
—	DF	UKR	Andriy Mostovyi (on loan to (Georgia (country)) Shevardeni-1906 Tbilisi)
—	MF	UKR	Artem Schedryi (loan to (Estonia) FCI Levadia)
—	MF	BRA	Vagner Gonçalves (loan return to Dnipro-1)
—	FW	UKR	Oleksiy Khoblenko (loan to (Estonia) FCI Levadia)

=== Metalist Kharkiv ===
In:

No.	Pos.	Nation	Player
—	GK	UKR	Vladyslav Rybak (from Olimpik Donetsk)
—	MF	UKR	Aleks Chidomere (from Obolon Kyiv)
—	MF	UKR	Andriy Stryzhak (from Olimpik Donetsk)
—	MF	UKR	Artur Murza (from Obolon Kyiv)
—	MF	ECU	Juan Cazares (from (Brazil) Corinthians)
—	MF	UKR	Yehor Kartushov (from Desna Chernihiv)
—	FW	KAZ	Matvey Gerasimov (loan return from (Belarus) Isloch)
—	FW	BRA	Paulinho Bóia (from (Brazil) São Paulo)

Out:

No.	Pos.	Nation	Player
—	GK	UKR	Danylo Kanevtsev (to (Georgia (country)) Dila Gori)
—	GK	UKR	Andriy Bubentsov (to Polissya Zhytomyr)
—	FW	BRA	David (to (Brazil) Fortaleza)
—	FW	KAZ	Matvey Gerasimov
—	FW	COL	Brayan Riascos (on loan to (Switzerland) Grasshoppers)

=== Nyva Ternopil ===
In:

No.	Pos.	Nation	Player

Out:

No.	Pos.	Nation	Player
—	DF	UKR	Artem Vasko
—	MF	UKR	Ihor Semenyna (to Karpaty Lviv)
—	FW	UKR	Andriy Skakun

=== Obolon Kyiv ===
In:

No.	Pos.	Nation	Player
—	DF	UKR	Maksym Potopalskyi (loan return from Chaika Petropavlivska Borshchahivka)
—	MF	UKR	Dmytriy Sychevskyi (loan return from Chaika Petropavlivska Borshchahivka)
—	FW	UKR	Stanislav Vasylenko (loan return from Chaika Petropavlivska Borshchahivka)

Out:

No.	Pos.	Nation	Player
—	DF	UKR	Mykyta Bezuhlyi (to Metalist Kharkiv)
—	MF	UKR	Dmytro Kasimov (to Mynai)
—	MF	UKR	Artur Murza (to Metalist Kharkiv)
—	MF	UKR	Aleks Chidomere (to Metalist Kharkiv)

=== Olimpik Donetsk ===
In:

No.	Pos.	Nation	Player
—	DF	UKR	Rudolf Sukhomlynov (loan return from Rubikon Kyiv)
—	MF	UKR	Vladyslav Ulyanchenko (loan return from Rubikon Kyiv)
—	FW	NGR	Geoffrey Chinedu (loan return from (Finland) Lahti)

Out:

No.	Pos.	Nation	Player
—	GK	UKR	Vladyslav Rybak (to Metalist Kharkiv)
—	GK	UKR	Tymofiy Sheremeta (to VPK-Ahro Shevchenkivka)
—	GK	UKR	Vadym Prokopenko
—	DF	UKR	Ivan Bilyi
—	MF	UKR	Andriy Stryzhak (loan return Metalist Kharkiv)
—	MF	UKR	Vyacheslav Koydan (to FC Chernihiv)
—	MF	CIV	Gbamblé Bi Néné Junior
—	MF	UKR	Yuriy Hlushchuk
—	FW	NGR	Geoffrey Chinedu (to (Finland) Lahti)
—	FW	UKR	Artem Kovbasa
—	FW	UKR	Vladyslav Mudryk
—	FW	UKR	Ihor Kirienko (to (Georgia (country)) Shevardeni-1906 Tbilisi)

=== Podillya Khmelnytskyi ===
In:

No.	Pos.	Nation	Player

Out:

No.	Pos.	Nation	Player
—	GK	UKR	Yevhen Kucherenko (loan return to Kolos Kovalivka)
—	MF	UKR	Stanislav Morarenko (loan return to Kolos Kovalivka)
—	FW	UKR	Stanislav Koval (loan return to Kolos Kovalivka)
—	FW	UKR	Ihor Karpenko (to (Kazakhstan) Akzhayik)

=== Polissya Zhytomyr ===
In:

No.	Pos.	Nation	Player
—	GK	UKR	Andriy Bubentsov (from Metalist Kharkiv)
—	DF	UKR	Bohdan Kushnirenko (from Vorskla Poltava)
—	MF	UKR	Arseniy Batahov (on loan from Dnipro-1)
—	FW	UKR	Vladyslav Vakula (on loan from Shakhtar Donetsk)
—	FW	UKR	Pylyp Budkivskyi (from Desna Chernihiv)

Out:

No.	Pos.	Nation	Player
—	GK	GEO	Zauri Makharadze
—	GK	UKR	Anatoliy Tymofeyev (to VPK-Ahro Shevchenkivka)
—	DF	UKR	Badri Akubardia (to (Georgia (country)) Shevardeni-1906 Tbilisi)
—	DF	UKR	Serhiy Shvets (to Kramatorsk)
—	DF	UKR	Artem Terekhov
—	MF	UKR	Ihor Chaykovskyi
—	MF	UKR	Oleksandr Hlahola (to Uzhhorod)
—	MF	UKR	Yevhen Morozko (loan return to Kolos Kovalivka)
—	FW	UKR	Yuriy Kolomoyets (to Mynai)
—	FW	UKR	Bohdan Orynchak (to Prykarpattia Ivano-Frankivsk)
—	FW	UKR	Ihor Karpenko (to (Kazakhstan) Akzhayik)

=== Prykarpattia Ivano-Frankivsk ===
In:

No.	Pos.	Nation	Player
—	GK	UKR	Andriy Novak (retired)
—	DF	UKR	Oleksandr Holovko (from Kremin Kremenchuk)
—	MF	UKR	Andriy Kokhman (loan return from Uzhhorod)

Out:

No.	Pos.	Nation	Player
—	DF	UKR	Mykola Kvasnyi
—	DF	UKR	Bohdan Mytsyk
—	DF	UKR	Ivan Pastukh
—	MF	UKR	Roman Tolochko

=== Uzhhorod ===
In:

No.	Pos.	Nation	Player
—	MF	UKR	Oleksandr Hlahola (from Polissya Zhytomyr)
—	FW	UKR	Illya Kornyev (from Peremoha Dnipro)

Out:

No.	Pos.	Nation	Player
—	GK	UKR	Vadym Yushchyshyn (loan return to Veres Rivne)
—	DF	UKR	Oleksandr Aksyonov (to Mynai)
—	DF	UKR	Vasyl Betsa
—	MF	UKR	Andriy Kokhman (loan return to Prykarpattia Ivano-Frankivsk)
—	MF	UKR	Vasyl Pynyashko (to (Hungary) Kazincbarcikai)
—	MF	UKR	Viktor Ryashko (to (Hungary) Kazincbarcikai)
—	MF	UKR	Andriy Vyskrebentsev (loan return to Mariupol)
—	FW	UKR	Vadym Ferentsyk
—	FW	UKR	Mykola Hayduchyk (loan return to Veres Rivne)
—	FW	UKR	Viktor Khomchenko
—	FW	UKR	Pavlo Tyshchuk

=== VPK-Ahro Shevchenkivka ===
In: Note: Flags indicate national team as defined under FIFA eligibility rules; some limited exceptions apply. Players may hold more than one non-FIFA nationality.

No.	Pos.	Nation	Player
—	GK	UKR	Anatoliy Tymofeyev (from Polissya Zhytomyr)
—	GK	UKR	Tymofiy Sheremeta (from Olimpik Donetsk)
—	GK	UKR	Myroslav Znovenko (on loan from Dnipro-1)

Out: Note: Flags indicate national team as defined under FIFA eligibility rules; some limited exceptions apply. Players may hold more than one non-FIFA nationality.

No.	Pos.	Nation	Player
—	GK	UKR	Kostyantyn Makhnovskyi (to (Kazakhstan) Akzhayik)
—	GK	UKR	Viktor Babichyn (loan return to Rukh Lviv)
—	DF	GEO	Akaki Khubutia
—	DF	UKR	Serhiy Palyukh (to Metalurh Zaporizhzhia)
—	DF	UKR	Dmytro Zozulya (to (Georgia (country)) Shevardeni-1906 Tbilisi)
—	DF	UKR	Tymofiy Sukhar (loan return to Zorya Luhansk)
—	MF	GEO	Luka Koberidze (to (Georgia (country)) Sioni Bolnisi)
—	MF	UKR	Ivan Lytvynenko (loan return to Rukh Lviv)
—	FW	UKR	Ivan Budnyak (to Peremoha Dnipro)
—	FW	KAZ	Oleksandr Yarovenko

== Ukrainian Second League ==
=== AFSC Kyiv ===
In:

No.	Pos.	Nation	Player
—			

Out:

No.	Pos.	Nation	Player
—	DF	UKR	Dmytro Zelenko
—	MF	UKR	Mykyta Nagornyi
—	MF	UKR	Bogdan Nagayskyi
—	MF	UKR	Vladyslav Garnaga

=== Balkany Zorya ===
In:

No.	Pos.	Nation	Player

Out:

No.	Pos.	Nation	Player
—	DF	UKR	Demyan Pyenov (retired)
—	DF	UKR	Volodymyr Malenkov
—	DF	UKR	Dmytro Heyko (loan return to Chornomorets Odesa)
—	DF	UKR	Volodymyr Havrylyuk (retired)
—	MF	UKR	Oleksandr Byelykh
—	MF	UKR	Maksym Vdovychenko
—	FW	UKR	Dmytro Bolokan
—	FW	UKR	Volodymyr Pryyomov (to Tavriya Simferopol)

=== Bukovyna Chernivtsi ===
In:

No.	Pos.	Nation	Player

Out:

No.	Pos.	Nation	Player
—	GK	UKR	Ivan Ponomarenko (to Lviv)

=== Chaika Petropavlivska Borshchahivka ===
In:

No.	Pos.	Nation	Player
—	DF	UKR	Artem Kozlov (from Kramatorsk)

Out:

No.	Pos.	Nation	Player
—	GK	UKR	Dmytro Ivanov
—	GK	UKR	Dmytro Mikhyeyev
—	DF	UKR	Maksym Potopalskyi (loan return to Obolon Kyiv)
—	MF	UKR	Dmytriy Sychevskyi (loan return to Obolon Kyiv)
—	MF	UKR	Artur Arakelyan
—	MF	UKR	Oleksandr Mosiyuk
—	MF	UKR	Kyrylo Kovalenko
—	MF	UKR	Serhiy Rusyan (to Ahrobiznes Volochysk)
—	MF	UKR	Oleksandr Dovhyi
—	MF	UKR	Andriy Kuznyetsov
—	MF	UKR	Volodymyr Tymenko
—	MF	UKR	Tymur Pohranichnyi
—	FW	UKR	Stanislav Vasylenko (loan return to Obolon Kyiv)

=== Chernihiv ===
In:

No.	Pos.	Nation	Player
—	MF	UKR	Vyacheslav Koydan (from Olimpik Donetsk)

Out:

No.	Pos.	Nation	Player
—	DF	UKR	Ihor Samoylenko (End of Contract)
—	MF	UKR	Bohdan Lazarenko (End of Contract)
—	FW	UKR	Vladyslav Kyryn (End of Contract)

=== Dinaz Vyshhorod ===
In:

No.	Pos.	Nation	Player
—			

Out:

No.	Pos.	Nation	Player
—	DF	UKR	Roman Pomazan
—	DF	UKR	Volodymyr Krokhmal
—	MF	UKR	Tamaz Avdalyan
—	MF	UKR	Maksym Banasevych (to Livyi Bereh Kyiv)
—	FW	UKR	Oleksandr Apanchuk (to Ahrobiznes Volochysk)
—	MF	UKR	Yevhen Chepurnenko (to (Kazakhstan) Zhetysu)

=== Dnipro Cherkasy ===
In:

No.	Pos.	Nation	Player
—			

Out:

No.	Pos.	Nation	Player
—	GK	UKR	Kiril Samoylenko
—	GK	UKR	Artem Deneha
—	GK	UKR	Andriy Lyenchikov
—	DF	UKR	Yevheniy Onyshchenko
—	DF	UKR	Yevhen Kuznetsov
—	DF	UKR	Vladyslav Barskyi
—	DF	UKR	Anatoliy Klyus
—	MF	UKR	Pavlo Shostka
—	MF	UKR	Serhiy Kopyl
—	MF	UKR	Maksym Chernenko
—	MF	UKR	Maksym Chernenko
—	MF	UKR	Ihor Duvnyak
—	MF	UKR	Kyrylo Bystrytskyi
—	MF	UKR	Danylo Chyzhyk
—	MF	UKR	Bohdan Vinichenko
—	MF	UKR	Yehor Pinchuk
—	MF	UKR	Markiyan Pyrih
—	MF	UKR	Serhiy Bida
—	FW	UKR	Yaroslav Savisko
—	FW	UKR	Viktor Martyan

=== Enerhiya Nova Kakhovka ===
In:

No.	Pos.	Nation	Player
—	MF	UKR	Viktor Okatyi (from Mykolaiv)
—	MF	UKR	Vladyslav Zhavko (from Mykolaiv)
—	MF	UKR	Maksym Krutin (to Krystal Kherson)

Out:

No.	Pos.	Nation	Player
—	DF	UKR	Oleksandr Nesteruk
—	DF	UKR	Yuriy Hezelo
—	DF	UKR	Ivan Kiriyenko
—	MF	UKR	Denys Shved
—	MF	UKR	Vladyslav Bondar

=== Epitsentr Dunaivtsi ===
In:

No.	Pos.	Nation	Player
—			

Out:

No.	Pos.	Nation	Player
—			

=== Karpaty Halych ===
In:

No.	Pos.	Nation	Player
—			

Out:

No.	Pos.	Nation	Player
—	DF	UKR	Andriy Malets

=== Karpaty Lviv ===
In:

No.	Pos.	Nation	Player
—	DF	UKR	Andriy Markovych (from (Estonia) Nõmme Kalju)
—	DF	UKR	Ivan Tsyupa (from Volyn Lutsk)
—	MF	UKR	Ihor Semenyna (from Nyva Ternopil)

Out:

No.	Pos.	Nation	Player
—	DF	UKR	Ivan Tsyupa (on loan to (Slovenia) Vranov)
—	FW	UKR	Yevhen Budnik (to (Greece) Asteras Vlachioti)

=== Krystal Kherson ===
In:

No.	Pos.	Nation	Player
—			

Out:

No.	Pos.	Nation	Player
—	MF	UKR	Maksym Krutin (to Enerhiya Nova Kakhovka)

=== Livyi Bereh Kyiv ===
In:

No.	Pos.	Nation	Player
—	DF	UKR	Dmytro Fatyeyev (from Kryvbas Kryvyi Rih)
—	MF	UKR	Maksym Banasevych (from Dinaz Vyshhorod)

Out:

No.	Pos.	Nation	Player
—	DF	UKR	Oleh Karamushka (Retired)
—	MF	UKR	Renat Mochulyak (to Ahrobiznes Volochysk)
—	MF	UKR	Yegor Vdovenko
—	MF	UKR	Volodymyr Tsolan
—	MF	UKR	Dmytro Bulyha
—	MF	UKR	Oleksandr Huskov
—	FW	UKR	Mykyta Komisar
—	FW	UKR	Viktor Berko
—	FW	UKR	Oleksandr Akymenko (Retired)

=== LNZ Cherkasy ===
In:

No.	Pos.	Nation	Player
—	MF	UKR	Illya Kovalenko (from Inhulets Petrove)
—	MF	UKR	Maksym Kalenchuk (from (Belarus) Vitebsk)
—	FW	UKR	Andriy Novikov (from Oleksandriya)

Out:

No.	Pos.	Nation	Player
—	GK	UKR	Yevhen Panchenko
—	MF	UKR	Oleksandr Volkov
—	MF	UKR	Oleksandr Snizhko
—	MF	UKR	Ivan Bobko (to Chornomorets Odesa)
—	MF	UKR	Maksym Kalenchuk (to (Kazakhstan) Akzhayik)

=== Lyubomyr Stavyshche ===
In:

No.	Pos.	Nation	Player
—			

Out:

No.	Pos.	Nation	Player
—	GK	UKR	Dmytro Chernysh (loan return to Kryvbas Kryvyi Rih)
—	GK	UKR	Mykyta Ovcharov
—	GK	UKR	Maksym Dyogtyar
—	DF	UKR	Illya Tymoshenko
—	DF	UKR	Orkhan Ibadov
—	MF	UKR	Mykyta Komisar
—	MF	UKR	Andriy Yurchenko
—	MF	UKR	Artem Marchenko
—	MF	UKR	Andriy Fayuk
—	FW	UKR	Yevheniy Nikolashyn (loan return to Kryvbas Kryvyi Rih)

=== Metalurh Zaporizhzhia ===
In:

No.	Pos.	Nation	Player
—	DF	UKR	Serhiy Palyukh (from VPK-Ahro Shevchenkivka)
—	DF	UKR	Bohdan Veklyak (from Mynai)

Out:

No.	Pos.	Nation	Player
—			

=== MFA Mukachevo ===
In:

No.	Pos.	Nation	Player
—			

Out:

No.	Pos.	Nation	Player
—	DF	UKR	Oleksandr Pyshchur (to (Hungary) Puskás Akadémia II)

=== Mykolaiv ===
In:

No.	Pos.	Nation	Player

Out:

No.	Pos.	Nation	Player
—	MF	UKR	Vladyslav Roslyakov (to Hirnyk-Sport Horishni Plavni)
—	MF	UKR	Viktor Okatyi (to Enerhiya Nova Kakhovka)
—	MF	UKR	Vladyslav Zhavko (to Enerhiya Nova Kakhovka)
—	FW	UKR	Serhiy Kravchenko (to Tavriya Simferopol)

=== Nikopol ===
In:

No.	Pos.	Nation	Player
—			

Out:

No.	Pos.	Nation	Player
—	GK	UKR	Myroslav Znovenko (loan return to Dnipro-1)

=== Nyva Vinnytsia ===
In:

No.	Pos.	Nation	Player
—			

Out:

No.	Pos.	Nation	Player
—	FW	UKR	Dmytro Kozban

=== Peremoha Dnipro ===
In:

No.	Pos.	Nation	Player
—	DF	UKR	Dmytro Nyemchaninov (from Veres Rivne)
—	FW	UKR	Ivan Budnyak (from VPK-Ahro Shevchenkivka)
—	FW	UKR	Robert Hehedosh (from Veres Rivne)

Out:

No.	Pos.	Nation	Player
—	GK	UKR	Vadym Soldatenko
—	DF	UKR	Bohdan Ponomarenko
—	MF	UKR	Mykyta Donhauzer
—	MF	UKR	Mykola Lyashenko
—	MF	UKR	Bohdan Lytvyak
—	MF	UKR	Mykyta Vyshnevskyi
—	MF	UKR	Andriy Slinkin (to (Georgia (country)) Shevardeni-1906 Tbilisi)

=== Poltava ===
In:

No.	Pos.	Nation	Player
—			

Out:

No.	Pos.	Nation	Player
—	GK	UKR	Oleksandr Popov
—	DF	UKR	Roman Zorya
—	MF	UKR	Oleksandr Ponomarenko

=== Real Pharma Odesa ===
In:

No.	Pos.	Nation	Player
—			

Out:

No.	Pos.	Nation	Player
—			

=== Rubikon Kyiv ===
In:

No.	Pos.	Nation	Player
—	MF	UKR	Vladyslav Hromenko (loan return from Rubikon Kyiv)

Out:

No.	Pos.	Nation	Player
—	DF	UKR	Rudolf Sukhomlynov (loan return to Olimpik Donetsk)
—	MF	UKR	Vladyslav Ulyanchenko (loan return to Olimpik Donetsk)
—	MF	UKR	Vladyslav Hromenko (to Hirnyk-Sport Horishni Plavni)

=== Skoruk Tomakivka ===
In:

No.	Pos.	Nation	Player
—			

Out:

No.	Pos.	Nation	Player
—			

=== Sumy ===
In:

No.	Pos.	Nation	Player
—			

Out:

No.	Pos.	Nation	Player
—			

=== Tavriya Simferopol ===
In:

No.	Pos.	Nation	Player
—	DF	UKR	Bohdan Khobta
—	FW	UKR	Volodymyr Pryyomov (from Balkany Zorya)
—	FW	UKR	Serhiy Kravchenko (from Mykolaiv)

Out:

No.	Pos.	Nation	Player
—	DF	UKR	Kostyantyn Yatsyk
—	MF	UKR	Yan Karanha
—	MF	UKR	Valeriy Dolya
—	MF	UKR	Vladyslav Vakulinskyi
—	MF	UKR	Maksym Bohdanov
—	FW	UKR	Volodymyr Pryyomov (to (Estonia) Narva Trans)

=== Trostianets ===
In:

No.	Pos.	Nation	Player
—			

Out:

No.	Pos.	Nation	Player
—			

=== Viktoriya Mykolaivka ===
In:

No.	Pos.	Nation	Player
—			

Out:

No.	Pos.	Nation	Player
—	MF	UKR	Yevhen Lozovyi (to (Georgia (country)) Shevardeni-1906 Tbilisi)

=== Vovchansk ===
In:

No.	Pos.	Nation	Player
—			

Out:

No.	Pos.	Nation	Player
—			

=== Yarud Mariupol ===
In:

No.	Pos.	Nation	Player
—			

Out:

No.	Pos.	Nation	Player
—			
