= List of Ukrainian football transfers summer 2021 =

This is a list of Ukrainian football transfers summer 2021. Only clubs in 2021–22 Ukrainian Premier League are included.

== Ukrainian Premier League ==
=== Chornomorets Odesa ===
In:

No.	Pos.	Nation	Player
—	GK	UKR	Vladyslav Kucheruk (on loan from Dynamo Kyiv)
—	DF	UKR	Kristian Bilovar (on loan from Dynamo Kyiv)
—	DF	UKR	Valeriy Dubko (on loan from Vorskla Poltava)
—	DF	UKR	Denys Kuzyk (on loan from Dynamo Kyiv)
—	DF	UKR	Danylo Skorko (on loan from Dynamo Kyiv)
—	DF	UKR	Roman Vantukh (on loan from Dynamo Kyiv)
—	MF	UKR	Bohdan Biloshevskyi (on loan from Dynamo Kyiv)
—	MF	GHA	Mohammed Kadiri (on loan from Dynamo Kyiv)
—	MF	UKR	Mykola Mykhaylenko (on loan from Dynamo Kyiv)
—	MF	UKR	Yaroslav Nadolskyi (on loan from Dynamo Kyiv)
—	MF	UKR	Yevhen Smyrnyi (on loan from Dynamo Kyiv)
—	MF	UKR	Yuriy Tlumak (on loan from Dynamo Kyiv)
—	MF	GEO	Heorhiy Tsitaishvili (on loan from Dynamo Kyiv)
—	FW	UKR	Yevhen Isayenko (on loan from Dynamo Kyiv)
—	FW	UKR	Vladyslav Vanat (on loan from Dynamo Kyiv)

Out:

No.	Pos.	Nation	Player
—	GK	UKR	Bohdan Kurilko
—	GK	UKR	Roman Pidkivka
—	DF	SLO	Miha Goropevšek
—	DF	UKR	Dmytro Heyko (on loan to Balkany Zorya)
—	DF	UKR	Maksym Melnychuk (loan return to Vorskla Poltava)
—	DF	UKR	Stanislav Mykytsey (to FC Mariupol)
—	DF	UKR	Dmytro Pospelov (to Inhulets Petrove)
—	DF	UKR	Yevhen Zubeyko (to Viktoriya Mykolaivka)
—	MF	UKR	Roman Bodnya (loan return to Dynamo Kyiv)
—	MF	UKR	Vladyslav Klymenko (to FC Mariupol)
—	MF	UKR	Dmytro Korkishko (to (Kazakhstan) FC Aktobe)
—	MF	UKR	Artem Kovbasa (to Olimpik Donetsk)
—	MF	UKR	Artem Kozak (to Polissya Zhytomyr)
—	MF	UKR	Viktor Lykhovydko (to FC Mynai)
—	MF	UKR	Rinar Valeyev (to Peremoha Dnipro)
—	MF	UKR	Artur Vashchyshyn (loan return to Dynamo Kyiv)
—	MF	UKR	Andriy Yakymiv (to Inhulets Petrove)
—	FW	UKR	Roman Yalovenko (to Olimpik Donetsk)

=== Desna Chernihiv ===
In:

No.	Pos.	Nation	Player
—	GK	UKR	Roman Mysak (from Rukh Lviv)
—	GK	UKR	Dmytro Sydorenko (from Desna-3 Chernihiv)
—	GK	UKR	Illya Karavashchenko (loan returned from VPK-Ahro)
—	DF	UKR	Kristian Bilovar (on loan from Dynamo Kyiv)
—	DF	UKR	Oleksiy Kovtun (from Mynai)
—	DF	UKR	Oleksandr Safronov (from SC Dnipro-1)
—	DF	UKR	Yevhen Selin (from (Cyprus) Anorthosis Famagusta)
—	DF	UKR	Yevhen Tsymbalyuk (from Olimpik Donetsk)
—	DF	UKR	Vadym Zhuk (from Hirnyk-Sport Horishni Plavni)
—	DF	UKR	Oleksandr Masalov (from (Moldova) Dinamo-Auto)
—	MF	UKR	Serhiy Bolbat (on loan from Shakhtar Donetsk)
—	MF	UKR	Pavlo Shostka (from Desna-3 Chernihiv)
—	MF	UKR	Yevheniy Belych (From Desna-2 Chernihiv)
—	MF	BLR	Artem Khatskevich (on loan from Dynamo Kyiv)
—	MF	UKR	Vladlen Yurchenko (from Zorya Luhansk)
—	MF	UKR	Taras Zaviyskyi (from Olimpik Donetsk)
—	MF	UKR	Vikentiy Voloshyn (on loan from Dynamo Kyiv)
—	MF	UKR	Renat Mochulyak (from Desna-2 Chernihiv)
—	MF	UKR	Denys Demyanenko (from Desna-2 Chernihiv)
—	FW	UKR	Illya Shevtsov (loan return from Inhulets Petrove)

Out:

No.	Pos.	Nation	Player
—	GK	UKR	Yevhen Past (to SC Dnipro-1)
—	GK	UKR	Illya Karavashchenko (on loan to VPK-Ahro Shevchenkivka)
—	DF	UKR	Kristian Bilovar (loan return to Dynamo Kyiv)
—	DF	UKR	Andriy Hitchenko (to Polissya Zhytomyr)
—	DF	UKR	Maksym Imerekov (to Zorya Luhansk)
—	DF	UKR	Pavlo Shostka (to Dnipro Cherkasy)
—	DF	UKR	Vitaliy Yermakov (to Metalist 1925 Kharkiv)
—	DF	UKR	Yukhym Konoplya (loan return to Shakhtar Donetsk)
—	DF	UKR	Andriy Mostovyi (to Kryvbas Kryvyi Rih)
—	DF	UKR	Pavlo Polehenko (to Inhulets Petrove)
—	DF	EST	Joonas Tamm (to Vorskla Poltava)
—	DF	ROU	Constantin Dima (to (Romania) UTA Arad)
—	DF	UKR	Artem Sukhotskyi
—	DF	UKR	Kristian Bilovar (on loan return to Dynamo Kyiv)
—	MF	UKR	Bohdan Biloshevskyi (loan return to Dynamo Kyiv)
—	MF	UKR	Yevhen Chepurnenko (to Dinaz Vyshhorod)
—	MF	UKR	Vladyslav Ohirya (to Polissya Zhytomyr)
—	MF	UKR	Oleksandr Volkov (to LNZ Cherkasy)
—	MF	UKR	Oleksiy Hutsulyak (to Dnipro-1)
—	MF	UKR	Renat Mochulyak (to Livyi Bereh Kyiv)

=== Dnipro-1 ===
In:

No.	Pos.	Nation	Player
—	GK	ROU	Valentin Cojocaru (from (Romania) Viitorul Constanța)
—	GK	UKR	Yevhen Past (from Desna Chernihiv)
—	DF	UKR	Mykyta Kravchenko (on loan from Dynamo Kyiv)
—	DF	POR	Nélson Monte (from (Portugal) Rio Ave)
—	MF	UKR	Oleksandr Byelyayev (loan return from VPK-Ahro Shevchenkivka)
—	MF	CRO	Neven Đurasek (on loan from (Croatia) Dinamo Zagreb)
—	MF	UKR	Oleksiy Hutsulyak (from Desna Chernihiv)
—	MF	UKR	Valeriy Luchkevych (from FC Oleksandriya)
—	MF	UKR	Oleksandr Pikhalyonok (from Shakhtar Donetsk)
—	MF	SUI	Griffin Sabatini (loan return from (Scotland) Airdrieonians)
—	FW	UKR	Oleksiy Khoblenko (loan return from (Norway) Stabæk)
—	FW	UKR	Nazariy Rusyn (on loan from Dynamo Kyiv)

Out:

No.	Pos.	Nation	Player
—	GK	UKR	Kyrylo Arkhypchuk (to FC Vovchansk)
—	GK	GEO	Zauri Makharadze (to Polissya Zhytomyr)
—	GK	UKR	Bohdan Sarnavskyi (on loan to Kryvbas Kryvyi Rih)
—	GK	UKR	Danylo Veklych (to Inhulets Petrove)
—	GK	UKR	Myroslav Znovenko (to FC Nikopol)
—	DF	BRA	Douglas (to (Turkey) Giresunspor)
—	DF	UKR	Taras Horilyi (to FC Nikopol)
—	DF	UKR	Oleksiy Khyzhnyak (to FC Nikopol)
—	DF	UKR	Oleksandr Safronov (to Desna Chernihiv)
—	DF	UKR	Nazar Sydorenko (to FC Nikopol)
—	DF	BRA	Lucas Taylor (to (Greece) PAOK)
—	DF	UKR	Andriy Tsurikov (to Metalist Kharkiv)
—	DF	UKR	Serhiy Zayets (to FC Nikopol)
—	MF	UKR	Oleksandr Byelyayev (on loan to (Turkey) Gençlerbirliği)
—	MF	UKR	Serhiy Buletsa (loan return to Dynamo Kyiv)
—	MF	UKR	Oleksandr Pikhalyonok (loan return to Shakhtar Donetsk)
—	MF	BRA	Vagner Gonçalves (on loan to Kryvbas Kryvyi Rih)
—	MF	SUI	Griffin Sabatini
—	MF	UKR	Yuriy Vakulko (to (Latvia) Riga FC)
—	DF	UKR	Bohdan Hora (to FC Nikopol)
—	FW	UKR	Oleksiy Khoblenko (on loan to (Norway) Stabæk)
—	FW	UKR	Oleksiy Khoblenko (on loan to Kryvbas Kryvyi Rih)

=== Dynamo Kyiv ===
In:

No.	Pos.	Nation	Player
—	GK	UKR	Vladyslav Kucheruk (loan return from Kolos Kovalivka)
—	DF	UKR	Kristian Bilovar (loan return from Desna Chernihiv)
—	DF	UKR	Mykyta Kravchenko (loan return from Kolos Kovalivka)
—	DF	UKR	Artem Shabanov (loan return from (Poland) Legia Warsaw)
—	DF	UKR	Roman Vantukh (loan return from FC Oleksandriya)
—	DF	UKR	Mykola Yarosh (loan return from Metal Kharkiv)
—	DF	UKR	Kristian Bilovar (loan return from Desna Chernihiv)
—	MF	UKR	Denys Antyukh (from Kolos Kovalivka)
—	MF	NGR	Benito (loan return from Olimpik Donetsk)
—	MF	UKR	Bohdan Biloshevskyi (loan return from Desna Chernihiv)
—	MF	UKR	Roman Bodnya (loan return from Chornomorets Odesa)
—	MF	UKR	Serhiy Buletsa (loan return from SC Dnipro-1)
—	MF	LTU	Titas Buzas (from (Lithuania) DFK Dainava)
—	MF	SEN	Samba Diallo (from (Senegal) Académie Darou Salam)
—	MF	MAR	Mehdi El Hamishli
—	MF	UKR	Yevhen Smyrnyi (loan return from Kolos Kovalivka)
—	MF	GEO	Heorhiy Tsitaishvili (loan return from Vorskla Poltava)
—	MF	UKR	Artur Vashchyshyn (loan return from Chornomorets Odesa)
—	FW	UKR	Yevhen Isayenko (loan return from Kolos Kovalivka)
—	FW	BEL	Ibrahim Kargbo Jr. (loan return from Olimpik Donetsk)
—	FW	UKR	Vladyslav Kulach (from Vorskla Poltava)
—	FW	VEN	Eric Ramírez (from (Slovakia) DAC 1904 Dunajská Streda)
—	FW	UKR	Nazariy Rusyn (loan return from (Poland) Legia Warsaw)
—	FW	BLR	Ilya Shkurin (on loan from (Russia) CSKA Moscow)
—	FW	ESP	Fran Sol (loan return from (Spain) Tenerife)
—	FW	BRA	Vitinho (from (Brazil) Athletico Paranaense)

Out:

No.	Pos.	Nation	Player
—	GK	UKR	Vladyslav Kucheruk (on loan to Chornomorets Odesa)
—	DF	UKR	Kristian Bilovar (on loan to Chornomorets Odesa)
—	DF	UKR	Kristian Bilovar (on loan to Desna Chernihiv)
—	DF	GHA	Mohammed Kadiri (on loan to Chornomorets Odesa)
—	DF	UKR	Volodymyr Kostevych (on loan to Rukh Lviv)
—	DF	UKR	Mykyta Kravchenko (on loan to SC Dnipro-1)
—	DF	UKR	Denys Kuzyk (on loan to Chornomorets Odesa)
—	DF	BRA	Sidcley (on loan to (Greece) PAOK)
—	DF	UKR	Danylo Skorko (on loan to Chornomorets Odesa)
—	DF	UKR	Roman Vantukh (on loan to Chornomorets Odesa)
—	MF	UKR	Akhmed Alibekov (on loan to Zorya Luhansk)
—	MF	ROU	Tudor Băluță (loan return to (England) Brighton & Hove Albion)
—	MF	NGR	Benito (on loan to (Croatia) HNK Gorica)
—	MF	UKR	Bohdan Biloshevskyi (on loan to Chornomorets Odesa)
—	MF	UKR	Roman Bodnya (to FC Mynai)
—	MF	UKR	Serhiy Buletsa (on loan to Zorya Luhansk)
—	MF	DEN	Mikkel Duelund (on loan to (Netherlands) NEC Nijmegen)
—	MF	BLR	Artyom Khatskevich (on loan to Desna Chernihiv)
—	MF	UKR	Mykola Mykhaylenko (on loan to Chornomorets Odesa)
—	MF	UKR	Roman Mykhayliv (on loan to Lviv)
—	MF	UKR	Yaroslav Nadolskyi (on loan to Chornomorets Odesa)
—	MF	UKR	Yevhen Smyrnyi (on loan to Chornomorets Odesa)
—	MF	UKR	Yuriy Tlumak (on loan to Chornomorets Odesa)
—	MF	GEO	Heorhiy Tsitaishvili (on loan to Chornomorets Odesa)
—	MF	UKR	Artur Vashchyshyn (on loan to Podillya Khmelnytskyi)
—	MF	UKR	Vikentiy Voloshyn (on loan to Desna Chernihiv)
—	FW	BRA	Clayton (to (Brazil) CS Alagoano)
—	FW	UKR	Yevhen Isayenko (on loan to Chornomorets Odesa)
—	FW	LUX	Gerson Rodrigues (on loan to (France) Troyes)
—	FW	UKR	Nazariy Rusyn (on loan to SC Dnipro-1)
—	FW	ESP	Fran Sol (on loan to (Spain) Eibar)
—	FW	UKR	Vladyslav Vanat (on loan to Chornomorets Odesa)

=== Inhulets Petrove ===
In:

No.	Pos.	Nation	Player
—	GK	UKR	Yevhen Halchuk (from FC Mariupol)
—	GK	UKR	Danylo Veklych (from SC Dnipro-1)
—	DF	UKR	Maksym Melnychuk (on loan from Vorskla Poltava)
—	DF	UKR	Yevhen Opanasenko (from Vorskla Poltava)
—	DF	UKR	Pavlo Polehenko (from Desna Chernihiv)
—	DF	UKR	Dmytro Pospelov (from Chornomorets Odesa)
—	MF	GEO	Temur Chogadze (from Olimpik Donetsk)
—	MF	UKR	Ivan Holovkin (from Krystal Kherson)
—	MF	UKR	Vladyslav Sharay (from Alians Lypova Dolyna)
—	MF	UKR	Andriy Yakymiv (from Chornomorets Odesa)
—	FW	NGR	Stephen Gopey (from (Nigeria) Wikki Tourists)
—	FW	UKR	Artem Sitalo (from FC Oleksandriya)

Out:

No.	Pos.	Nation	Player
—	GK	UKR	Volodymyr Krynskyi (to Volyn Lutsk)
—	DF	UKR	Denys Balan (to Kryvbas Kryvyi Rih)
—	DF	MDA	Oleksandr Kucherenko (to Volyn Lutsk)
—	DF	UKR	Mykola Kvasnyi (to Prykarpattia Ivano-Frankivsk)
—	DF	UKR	Stanislav Peredystyi (to Viktoriya Mykolaivka)
—	DF	UKR	Andriy Semenko (to FC Mynai)
—	DF	UKR	Oleh Synyohub (to FC Mynai)
—	MF	UKR	Volodymyr Bilotserkovets (loan return to Zorya Luhansk)
—	MF	UKR	Ihor Chaykovskyi (to Polissya Zhytomyr)
—	MF	GEO	Temur Chogadze (to (Georgia (country)) FC Telavi)
—	MF	TAN	Yohana Mkomola (loan return to Vorskla Poltava)
—	MF	UKR	Artem Schedryi (to Kryvbas Kryvyi Rih)
—	MF	UKR	Suleyman Seytkhalilov (on loan to Kremin Kremenchuk)
—	MF	UKR	Denys Yanakov (loan return to Zorya Luhansk)
—	FW	GEO	Nika Sichinava (to Kolos Kovalivka)
—	FW	UKR	Illya Shevtsov (loan return to Desna Chernihiv)
—	FW	UKR	Denys Vasin (loan return to Vorskla Poltava)

=== Kolos Kovalivka ===
In:

No.	Pos.	Nation	Player
—	GK	UKR	Volodymyr Makhankov (from Polissya Zhytomyr)
—	DF	BLR	Aleksandr Pavlovets (on loan from (Russia) FC Rostov)
—	DF	UKR	Taras Sakiv (from FC Mynai)
—	DF	UKR	Illya Ukhan (from Mariupol)
—	MF	BRA	Diego Carioca (from (Belarus) FC Vitebsk)
—	MF	UKR	Vyacheslav Churko (from Shakhtar Donetsk)
—	MF	UKR	Vladyslav Veleten (free agent)
—	FW	UKR	Stanislav Koval (loan return from Polissya Zhytomyr)
—	FW	AZE	Anatoliy Nuriyev (from FC Mynai)
—	FW	BRA	Renan de Oliveira (from FC Lviv)
—	FW	GEO	Nika Sichinava (from Inhulets Petrove)

Out:

No.	Pos.	Nation	Player
—	GK	UKR	Yevhen Kucherenko (on loan to Podillya Khmelnytskyi)
—	GK	UKR	Vladyslav Kucheruk (loan return to Dynamo Kyiv)
—	DF	UKR	Mykyta Kravchenko (loan return to Dynamo Kyiv)
—	DF	UKR	Vadym Konovalov (to Vorskla Poltava)
—	DF	UKR	Oleksiy Zozulya (on loan to Lviv)
—	MF	UKR	Denys Antyukh (to Dynamo Kyiv)
—	MF	UKR	Vyacheslav Churko (loan return to Shakhtar Donetsk)
—	MF	UKR	Yevhen Morozko (on loan to Polissya Zhytomyr)
—	MF	UKR	Pavlo Orikhovskyi (to Rukh Lviv)
—	MF	UKR	Yevhen Smyrnyi (loan return to Dynamo Kyiv)
—	MF	UKR	Stanislav Sorokin (on loan to FC Lviv)
—	FW	UKR	Yevhen Isayenko (loan return to Dynamo Kyiv)
—	FW	UKR	Dmytro Khlyobas (to (Kazakhstan) Ordabasy)
—	FW	UKR	Stanislav Koval (on loan to Podillya Khmelnytskyi)
—	FW	UKR	Yevhen Seleznyov (to FC Mynai)

=== Lviv ===
In:

No.	Pos.	Nation	Player
—	DF	ROU	Mihai Leca (from (Romania) Argeș Pitești)
—	DF	UKR	Oleksiy Zozulya (on loan from Kolos Kovalivka)
—	MF	UKR	Vladyslav Khamelyuk (from Olimpik Donetsk)
—	MF	UKR	Roman Mykhayliv (on loan from Dynamo Kyiv)
—	MF	UKR	Serhiy Politylo (from Olimpik Donetsk)
—	MF	UKR	Stanislav Sorokin (on loan from Kolos Kovalivka)

Out:

No.	Pos.	Nation	Player
—	DF	UKR	Maksym Brama
—	DF	UKR	Ivan Lobay (to Karpaty Lviv (2020))
—	DF	FRA	Maroine Mihoubi
—	MF	UKR	Stanislav Demkiv (on loan to FC Vovchansk)
—	MF	LTU	Donatas Kazlauskas (to (Romania) Academica Clinceni)
—	MF	ARG	Lautaro Novach
—	MF	UKR	Dmytro Penteleychuk (on loan to FC Vovchansk)
—	MF	BRA	Rafael Sabino
—	MF	UKR	Serhiy Topchiy
—	FW	UKR	Maksym Khimchak (on loan to FC Vovchansk)
—	FW	BRA	Renan de Oliveira (to Kolos Kovalivka)
—	FW	BRA	Welves (on loan to (Azerbaijan) Zira)
—	FW	UKR	Yuriy Zakharkiv (to (Kazakhstan) Zhetysu)

=== Mariupol ===
In:

No.	Pos.	Nation	Player
—	GK	UKR	Artem Pospyelov (loan return from Avanhard Kramatorsk)
—	GK	UKR	Mykyta Turbayevskyi (on loan from Shakhtar Donetsk)
—	DF	CRO	Petar Bosančić (from (Croatia) Istra 1961)
—	DF	UKR	Stanislav Mykytsey (from Chornomorets Odesa)
—	DF	UKR	Dmytro Shynkarenko (loan return from Avanhard Kramatorsk)
—	DF	UKR	Danylo Udod (on loan from Shakhtar Donetsk)
—	MF	UKR	Artem Kholod (on loan from Shakhtar Donetsk)
—	MF	UKR	Mykhaylo Khromey (on loan from Shakhtar Donetsk)
—	MF	UKR	Vladyslav Klymenko (from Chornomorets Odesa)
—	MF	UKR	Artur Mykytyshyn (on loan from Shakhtar Donetsk)
—	MF	UKR	Denys Shostak (on loan from Shakhtar Donetsk)
—	MF	MKD	Stefan Spirovski (from (Cyprus) AEK Larnaca)
—	FW	UKR	Denys Svityukha (on loan from Shakhtar Donetsk)
—	FW	UKR	Bohdan Viunnyk (on loan from Shakhtar Donetsk)

Out:

No.	Pos.	Nation	Player
—	GK	UKR	Yevhen Halchuk (to Inhulets Petrove)
—	GK	UKR	Pavlo Kravtsov (to Yarud Mariupol)
—	GK	UKR	Artem Pospyelov (to FC Kramatorsk)
—	DF	UKR	Oleksiy Bykov (on loan to (Bulgaria) Lokomotiv Plovdiv)
—	DF	UKR	Ihor Kyryukhantsev (loan return to Shakhtar Donetsk)
—	DF	UKR	Nazariy Muravskyi (loan return to Shakhtar Donetsk)
—	DF	UKR	Kyrylo Romaniuk (to Feniks Synelnykove (amateurs))
—	DF	UKR	Danylo Sahutkin (to (Russia) Akron Tolyatti)
—	DF	UKR	Dmytro Shynkarenko (to Hirnyk-Sport Horishni Plavni)
—	DF	UKR	Pavlo Shushko (on loan to FC Kramatorsk)
—	DF	UKR	Illya Ukhan (to Kolos Kovalivka)
—	MF	UKR	Anton Baidal (to FC Mynai)
—	MF	UKR	Artem Bondarenko (loan return to Shakhtar Donetsk)
—	MF	UKR	Yaroslav Dobrokhotov (to Yarud Mariupol)
—	MF	UKR	Serhiy Horbunov (to Metalist Kharkiv)
—	MF	UKR	Eldar Kuliyev (to FC Mynai)
—	MF	UKR	Vyacheslav Tankovskyi (loan return to Shakhtar Donetsk)
—	MF	UKR	Ihor Tyschenko (to Yarud Mariupol)
—	MF	UKR	Andriy Vyskrebentsev (to FC Uzhhorod)
—	FW	UKR	Danylo Sikan (loan return to Shakhtar Donetsk)

=== Metalist 1925 Kharkiv ===
In:

No.	Pos.	Nation	Player
—	GK	UKR	Denys Shelikhov (from VPK-Ahro Shevchenkivka)
—	DF	BIH	Amar Kvakić (from (Austria) Kapfenberger SV)
—	DF	GEO	Solomon Kvirkvelia (from (Russia) Lokomotiv Moscow)
—	DF	UKR	Yuriy Potimkov (from Avanhard Kharkiv (amateurs))
—	DF	UKR	Vitaliy Yermakov (from Desna Chernihiv)
—	MF	BRA	Fabinho (from (Latvia) Ventspils)
—	MF	UKR	Yevhen Protasov (from Volyn Lutsk)
—	MF	UKR	Rostyslav Rusyn (from Rukh Lviv)
—	MF	UKR	Maksym Zaderaka (from (Armenia) Ararat Yerevan)
—	FW	BRA	Marlyson (on loan from (Brazil) Figueirense)
—	FW	UKR	Andriy Remenyuk (from Kryvbas Kryvyi Rih)
—	FW	UKR	Illya Zubkov (from Alyans Lypova Dolyna)

Out:

No.	Pos.	Nation	Player
—	GK	UKR	Denys Dyakov (to FC Vovchansk)
—	DF	UKR	Ivan Pets (to FC Vovchansk)
—	DF	UKR	Maksym Tsvyrenko (to Hirnyk-Sport Horishni Plavni)
—	MF	UKR	Yaroslav Dekhtyarenko
—	MF	UKR	Artem Kholod (loan return to Shakhtar Donetsk)
—	MF	UKR	Vitaliy Koltsov (to (Russia) SKA-Khabarovsk)
—	MF	UKR	Denys Ndukve (on loan to FC Kramatorsk)
—	MF	UKR	Denys Rezepov (on loan to FC Vovchansk)
—	MF	UKR	Mykhaylo Storozhenko (retired)
—	MF	UKR	Yaroslav Yampol (to Hirnyk-Sport Horishni Plavni)
—	FW	UKR	Valeriy Blazhko (on loan to FC Kramatorsk)
—	FW	UKR	Andriy Savitskyi (to FC Vovchansk)

=== Mynai ===
In:

No.	Pos.	Nation	Player
—	GK	UKR	Oleksandr Kemkin (from Shakhtar Donetsk)
—	GK	UKR	Danylo Kucher (from (Latvia) RFS)
—	GK	UKR	Herman Penkov (from (Armenia) Pyunik)
—	DF	UKR	Ihor Honchar (from (Armenia) Pyunik)
—	DF	UKR	Oleh Horin (free agent)
—	DF	UKR	Andriy Semenko (from Inhulets Petrove)
—	DF	UKR	Oleh Synyohub (from Inhulets Petrove)
—	DF	UKR	Bohdan Veklyak (from Olimpik Donetsk)
—	MF	UKR	Anton Baidal (from FC Mariupol)
—	MF	UKR	Dmytro Bilonoh (from (Russia) Yenisey Krasnoyarsk)
—	MF	UKR	Roman Bodnya (from Dynamo Kyiv)
—	MF	UKR	Eldar Kuliyev (from FC Mariupol)
—	MF	UKR	Viktor Lykhovydko (from Chornomorets Odesa)
—	MF	UKR	Mykhaylo Meskhi (from (Hungary) Mezőkövesd)
—	MF	UKR	Serhiy Myakushko (from (Poland) Podbeskidzie Bielsko-Biała)
—	FW	UKR	Edvard Kobak (on loan from Shakhtar Donetsk)
—	FW	UKR	Bohdan Kovalenko (free agent)
—	FW	UKR	Yevhen Seleznyov (from Kolos Kovalivka)
—	FW	UKR	Oleh Vyshnevskyi (from FC Uzhhorod)

Out:

No.	Pos.	Nation	Player
—	GK	UKR	Anton Kanibolotskiy
—	GK	AZE	Andrey Popovich (to LNZ Cherkasy)
—	GK	UKR	Illya Taran
—	DF	UKR	Vladyslav Chushenko (on loan to Uzhhorod)
—	DF	UKR	Maksym Lopyryonok (to LNZ Cherkasy)
—	DF	UKR	Oleksiy Kovtun (to Desna Chernihiv)
—	DF	UKR	Oleksandr Matkobozhyk (to Karpaty Lviv)
—	DF	UKR	Taras Sakiv (to Kolos Kovalivka)
—	DF	UKR	Petro Lutsiv (to Munkacs Mukacheve)
—	DF	UKR	Vasyl Lutsiv (to Munkacs Mukacheve)
—	DF	RSA	Tercious Malepe (to (South Africa) AmaZulu)
—	DF	ZAM	Shemmy Mayembe
—	MF	UKR	Vitaliy Boyko (to Kremin Kremenchuk)
—	MF	UKR	Denys Kozhanov (to Karpaty Lviv)
—	MF	UKR	Orest Panchyshyn (to Kremin Kremenchuk)
—	MF	UKR	Vasyl Pynyashko (to FC Uzhhorod)
—	MF	UKR	Andriy Tkachuk (to Karpaty Lviv)
—	MF	UKR	Oleksandr Snizhko (to LNZ Cherkasy)
—	FW	UKR	Oleksiy Fedorov (to Hirnyk-Sport Horishni Plavni)
—	FW	NGR	Ugochukwu Oduenyi (to (Kazakhstan) FC Zhetysu)
—	FW	UKR	Artem Milevskyi (retired)
—	FW	AZE	Anatoliy Nuriyev (to Kolos Kovalivka)

=== Oleksandriya ===
In:

No.	Pos.	Nation	Player
—	DF	MLI	Bourama Fomba (from (Romania) Chindia Târgoviște)
—	DF	UKR	Ihor Kyryukhantsev (on loan from Shakhtar Donetsk)
—	DF	UKR	Dmytro Semenov (loan return from Kremin Kremenchuk)
—	DF	UKR	Andriy Tsurikov (on loan from Metalist Kharkiv)
—	MF	UKR	Oleksandr Demchenko (from Kremin Kremenchuk)
—	MF	UKR	Serhiy Hryn (from Zorya Luhansk)
—	MF	UKR	Yuriy Kopyna (from Rukh Lviv)
—	MF	UKR	Serhiy Rybalka (from (Turkey) Sivasspor)
—	FW	UKR	Andriy Andreychuk (from Prykarpattia Ivano-Frankivsk)
—	FW	UKR	Oleh Kozhushko (from (Armenia) Pyunik)
—	FW	UKR	Volodymyr Odaryuk (from MFC Mykolaiv)
—	FW	ARG	Claudio Spinelli (on loan from (Italy) Genoa)

Out:

No.	Pos.	Nation	Player
—	GK	UKR	Vyacheslav Borysenko (to Enerhiya Nova Kakhovka)
—	GK	UKR	Yuriy Pankiv (to Rukh Lviv)
—	DF	AZE	Pavel Pashayev (to VPK-Ahro Shevchenkivka)
—	DF	UKR	Dmytro Semenov (to Kryvbas Kryvyi Rih)
—	DF	UKR	Roman Vantukh (loan return to Dynamo Kyiv)
—	DF	UKR	Valeriy Bondarenko (loan return to Shakhtar Donetsk)
—	MF	UKR	Yevhen Banada (to Metalist Kharkiv)
—	MF	UKR	Andriy Hloba (to FC Sumy)
—	MF	UKR	Dmytro Hrechyshkin (to (Turkey) Gençlerbirliği)
—	MF	UKR	Artem Hordiyenko (to Kryvbas Kryvyi Rih)
—	MF	UKR	Valeriy Luchkevych (to SC Dnipro-1)
—	MF	UKR	Bohdan Myshenko (to (Belarus) FC Gomel)
—	MF	UKR	Dmytro Shastal (to Polissya Zhytomyr)
—	FW	UKR	Artem Sitalo (to Inhulets Petrove)

=== Rukh Lviv ===
In:

No.	Pos.	Nation	Player
—	GK	UKR	Yuriy Pankiv (from FC Oleksandriya)
—	DF	NGR	Richmond Chukwuemeka (from (Nigeria) Super Star International Academy)
—	DF	UKR	Roman Didyk (from Ahrobiznes Volochysk)
—	DF	UKR	Volodymyr Kostevych (on loan from Dynamo Kyiv)
—	MF	ARG	Fabricio Alvarenga (from Olimpik Donetsk)
—	MF	UKR	Orest Kuzyk (from (Cyprus) Pafos)
—	MF	NGR	Michael Obamina (from (Nigeria) Super Star International Academy)
—	MF	NGR	Chidozie Odoh (from (Nigeria) Super Star International Academy)
—	MF	UKR	Pavlo Orikhovskyi (from Kolos Kovalivka)
—	MF	BRA	Talles Brener (from Olimpik Donetsk)
—	FW	CAN	Osaze De Rosario (free agent)

Out:

No.	Pos.	Nation	Player
—	GK	UKR	Viktor Babichyn (on loan to VPK-Ahro Shevchenkivka)
—	GK	UKR	Roman Mysak (to Desna Chernihiv)
—	DF	SLO	Erik Gliha (to (Slovenia) Olimpija Ljubljana)
—	DF	UKR	Petro Kharzhevskyi
—	DF	ISL	Ragnar Sigurðsson (to (Iceland) Fylkir)
—	DF	UKR	Oleh Veremiyenko (on loan to Podillya Khmelnytskyi)
—	DF	SLO	David Zec (loan return to (Portugal) Benfica B)
—	MF	UKR	Yuriy Kopyna (to FC Oleksandriya)
—	MF	UKR	Oleh Len (on loan to Prykarpattia Ivano-Frankivsk)
—	MF	UKR	Ivan Lytvynenko (on loan to VPK-Ahro Shevchenkivka)
—	MF	UKR	Volodymyr Rudyuk (on loan to Prykarpattia Ivano-Frankivsk)
—	MF	UKR	Rostyslav Rusyn (to Metalist 1925 Kharkiv)
—	FW	UZB	Bobur Abdikholikov (to (Belarus) Energetik-BGU Minsk)
—	FW	UKR	Mykola Kukharevych (to (France) Troyes)

=== Shakhtar Donetsk ===
In:

No.	Pos.	Nation	Player
—	DF	UKR	Valeriy Bondarenko (loan return from FC Oleksandriya)
—	DF	UKR	Bohdan Butko (loan return from (Turkey) BB Erzurumspor)
—	DF	UKR	Yukhym Konoplya (loan return from Desna Chernihiv)
—	DF	UKR	Ihor Kyryukhantsev (loan return from FC Mariupol)
—	DF	BRA	Marlon Santos (from (Italy) Sassuolo)
—	DF	UKR	Nazariy Muravskyi (loan return from FC Mariupol)
—	DF	UKR	Eduard Sobol (loan return from (Belgium) Club Brugge)
—	MF	UKR	Artem Bondarenko (loan return from FC Mariupol)
—	MF	UKR	Vyacheslav Churko (loan return from Kolos Kovalivka)
—	MF	UKR	Artem Kholod (loan return from Metalist 1925 Kharkiv)
—	MF	UKR	Andriy Kulakov (loan return from FC Mariupol)
—	MF	BRA	Pedrinho (from (Portugal) Benfica)
—	MF	UKR	Oleksandr Pikhalyonok (loan return from SC Dnipro-1)
—	MF	UKR	Vyacheslav Tankovskyi (loan return from FC Mariupol)
—	FW	UKR	Danylo Sikan (loan return from FC Mariupol)
—	FW	BFA	Lassina Traoré (from (Netherlands) Ajax)

Out:

No.	Pos.	Nation	Player
—	GK	UKR	Oleksandr Kemkin (to FC Mynai)
—	GK	UKR	Mykyta Turbayevskyi (on loan to FC Mariupol)
—	DF	UKR	Valeriy Bondarenko (on loan to Vorskla Poltava)
—	DF	UKR	Bohdan Butko
—	DF	UKR	Daniel Ehbudzhuo (on loan to FC Vovchansk)
—	DF	GEO	Davit Khocholava (to (Denmark) F.C. Copenhagen)
—	DF	UKR	Ihor Kyryukhantsev (on loan to FC Oleksandriya)
—	DF	UKR	Dmytro Pavlish
—	DF	UKR	Eduard Sobol (to (Belgium) Club Brugge)
—	DF	UKR	Danylo Udod (on loan to FC Mariupol)
—	DF	UKR	Roman Yakuba (to (Latvia) Valmiera)
—	MF	UKR	Serhiy Bolbat (on loan to Desna Chernihiv)
—	MF	UKR	Vyacheslav Churko (to Kolos Kovalivka)
—	MF	UKR	Artem Kholod (on loan to FC Mariupol)
—	MF	UKR	Mykhaylo Khromey (on loan to FC Mariupol)
—	MF	UKR	Edvard Kobak (on loan to FC Mynai)
—	MF	UKR	Vladyslav Kobylyanskyi (to (Turkey) Gaziantep)
—	MF	UKR	Maksym Malyshev
—	MF	UKR	Artur Mykytyshyn (on loan to FC Mariupol)
—	MF	UKR	Oleksandr Pikhalyonok (to SC Dnipro-1)
—	MF	UKR	Klim Prykhodko (on loan to Kryvbas Kryvyi Rih (2020))
—	MF	UKR	Denys Shostak (on loan to FC Mariupol)
—	MF	UKR	Vyacheslav Tankovskyi (to Metalist Kharkiv)
—	FW	UKR	Stanislav Biblyk (on loan to (Russia) Akron Tolyatti)
—	FW	BRA	Marquinhos Cipriano (on loan to (Switzerland) FC Sion)
—	FW	UKR	Denys Svityukha (on loan to FC Mariupol)
—	FW	UKR	Vladyslav Vakula (on loan to Vorskla Poltava)
—	FW	UKR	Bohdan Viunnyk (on loan to FC Mariupol)

=== Veres Rivne ===
In:

No.	Pos.	Nation	Player
—	GK	UKR	Artem Kychak (from Olimpik Donetsk)
—	MF	MDA	Mihail Ghecev (from (Moldova) Sfîntul Gheorghe)
—	MF	UKR	Dmytro Klyots (from (Azerbaijan) Sabah)
—	MF	UKR	Yevhen Pasich (from Olimpik Donetsk)
—	MF	UKR	Serhiy Shestakov (from (Hungary) Diósgyőri)

Out:

No.	Pos.	Nation	Player
—	GK	UKR	Vadym Yushchyshyn (on loan to FC Uzhhorod)
—	DF	UKR	Oleksandr Savoshko (on loan to FC Uzhhorod)
—	FW	UKR	Mykola Hayduchyk (on loan to FC Uzhhorod)

=== Vorskla Poltava ===
In:

No.	Pos.	Nation	Player
—	DF	UKR	Valeriy Bondarenko (on loan from Shakhtar Donetsk)
—	DF	UKR	Vadym Konovalov (from Kolos Kovalivka)
—	DF	UKR	Bohdan Kushnirenko (from MFC Mykolaiv)
—	DF	UKR	Maksym Melnychuk (loan return from Chornomorets Odesa)
—	DF	EST	Joonas Tamm (from Desna Chernihiv)
—	MF	TAN	Yohana Mkomola (loan return from Inhulets Petrove)
—	MF	LUX	Vincent Thill (from (Portugal) C.D. Nacional)
—	FW	UKR	Aderinsola Habib Eseola (from (Kazakhstan) Kairat)
—	FW	CRO	Ivan Pešić (loan return from (Romania) Voluntari)
—	FW	BRA	Lucas Rangel (from (Finland) KuPS)
—	FW	UKR	Vladyslav Vakula (on loan from Shakhtar Donetsk)
—	FW	UKR	Denys Vasin (loan return from Inhulets Petrove)

Out:

No.	Pos.	Nation	Player
81	GK	UKR	Oleksii Slutskyi (to Obolon Kyiv)
—	DF	FRA	Pape-Alioune Ndiaye (to (Austria) SCR Altach)
—	DF	NED	Bradley de Nooijer (loan return to (Romania) Viitorul Constanța)
—	DF	UKR	Valeriy Dubko (on loan to Chornomorets Odesa)
—	DF	UKR	Maksym Melnychuk (on loan to Inhulets Petrove)
—	DF	UKR	Yevhen Opanasenko (to Inhulets Petrove)
—	DF	UKR	Vadym Sapay (retired)
—	MF	UKR	Yan Kostenko (to SC Poltava)
—	MF	UKR	Artem Kulakovskyi (on loan to Hirnyk-Sport Horishni Plavni)
—	MF	BRA	Luizão (on loan to (Brazil) Bahia)
—	MF	UKR	Pavlo Rebenok (retired)
—	MF	UKR	Heorhiy Tsitaishvili (loan return to Dynamo Kyiv)
—	FW	UKR	Leon Hladkovskyi (on loan to FC Vovchansk)
—	FW	UKR	Oleksandr Kozhevnikov (on loan to Hirnyk-Sport Horishni Plavni)
—	FW	UKR	Vladyslav Kulach (to Dynamo Kyiv)
—	FW	UKR	Denys Vasin (to Kryvbas Kryvyi Rih)

=== Zorya Luhansk ===
In:

No.	Pos.	Nation	Player
—	DF	UKR	Maksym Imerekov (from Desna Chernihiv)
—	DF	UKR	Ihor Snurnitsyn (from Olimpik Donetsk)
—	MF	UKR	Akhmed Alibekov (on loan from Dynamo Kyiv)
—	MF	UKR	Volodymyr Bilotserkovets (loan return from Inhulets Petrove)
—	MF	UKR	Serhiy Buletsa (on loan from Dynamo Kyiv)
—	MF	UKR	Dmytro Piddubnyi (loan return from VPK-Ahro Shevchenkivka)
—	MF	UKR	Denys Yanakov (loan return from Inhulets Petrove)
—	FW	BRA	Cristian (from (Brazil) Grêmio Esportivo Brasil)
—	FW	BRA	Guilherme Smith (from (Brazil) Botafogo)

Out:

No.	Pos.	Nation	Player
—	GK	UKR	Danylo Khmelovskyi (to FC Trostianets)
—	GK	BIH	Nikola Vasilj (to (Germany) FC St. Pauli)
—	DF	UKR	Maksym Ahapov (to FC Kramatorsk)
—	DF	ISR	Joel Abu Hanna (to (Poland) Legia Warsaw)
—	MF	UKR	Volodymyr Bilotserkovets (on loan to Metalurh Zaporizhya)
—	MF	LAT	Andrejs Cigaņiks (to (Slovakia) DAC 1904 Dunajská Streda)
—	MF	UKR	Serhiy Hryn (to FC Oleksandriya)
—	MF	UKR	Dmytro Ivanisenya (to (Russia) Krylia Sovetov Samara)
—	MF	UKR	Artem Mylchenko (to Hirnyk-Sport Horishni Plavni)
—	MF	UKR	Dmytro Piddubnyi (on loan to Metalurh Zaporizhya)
—	MF	UKR	Denys Yanakov (on loan to Polissya Zhytomyr)
—	MF	UKR	Vladlen Yurchenko (to Desna Chernihiv)

== Ukrainian First League ==
=== Alians Lypova Dolyna ===
In: Note: Flags indicate national team as defined under FIFA eligibility rules; some limited exceptions apply. Players may hold more than one non-FIFA nationality.

No.	Pos.	Nation	Player

Out: Note: Flags indicate national team as defined under FIFA eligibility rules; some limited exceptions apply. Players may hold more than one non-FIFA nationality.

No.	Pos.	Nation	Player
-	MF	UKR	Vladyslav Sharay (to FC Inhulets Petrove)
-	GK	UKR	Ivan Bohdan
-	DF	UKR	Oleksandr Medvedev
-	DF	UKR	Yevhen Mezhenskiy
-	DF	UKR	Dmytro Shevchenko
-	FW	UKR	Illia Zubkov

=== Kryvbas Kryvyi Rih ===
In: Note: Flags indicate national team as defined under FIFA eligibility rules; some limited exceptions apply. Players may hold more than one non-FIFA nationality.

No.	Pos.	Nation	Player
-	DF	UKR	Andriy Mostovyi (from Desna Chernihiv)
-	FW	UKR	Denys Vasin (from Vorskla Poltava)
-	MF	UKR	Artem Hordiyenko (from Oleksandriya)
-	DF	UKR	Ivan Zotko (from Olimpik Donetsk)
-	FW	UKR	Oleksiy Khoblenko (On loan from Dnipro-1)

Out: Note: Flags indicate national team as defined under FIFA eligibility rules; some limited exceptions apply. Players may hold more than one non-FIFA nationality.

No.	Pos.	Nation	Player
-	FW	UKR	Viktor Berko (to Livyi Bereh Kyiv)
-	MF	UKR	Oleksandr Huskov (to Livyi Bereh Kyiv)

=== Hirnyk-Sport Horishni Plavni ===
In: Note: Flags indicate national team as defined under FIFA eligibility rules; some limited exceptions apply. Players may hold more than one non-FIFA nationality.

No.	Pos.	Nation	Player

Out: Note: Flags indicate national team as defined under FIFA eligibility rules; some limited exceptions apply. Players may hold more than one non-FIFA nationality.

No.	Pos.	Nation	Player
-	MF	UKR	Vadym Zhuk (to Desna Chernihiv)
-	MF	UKR	Ruslan Dedukh (to Nyva Ternopil)

=== Metal Kharkiv ===
In: Note: Flags indicate national team as defined under FIFA eligibility rules; some limited exceptions apply. Players may hold more than one non-FIFA nationality.

No.	Pos.	Nation	Player

Out: Note: Flags indicate national team as defined under FIFA eligibility rules; some limited exceptions apply. Players may hold more than one non-FIFA nationality.

No.	Pos.	Nation	Player
-	MF	UKR	Andriy Slotyuk (loan return to Desna-2 Chernihiv)
-	MF	SEN	Papa Gueye (Retired)

=== Nyva Ternopil ===
In: Note: Flags indicate national team as defined under FIFA eligibility rules; some limited exceptions apply. Players may hold more than one non-FIFA nationality.

No.	Pos.	Nation	Player
-	MF	UKR	Ruslan Dedukh (from Hirnyk-Sport Horishni Plavni)

Out: Note: Flags indicate national team as defined under FIFA eligibility rules; some limited exceptions apply. Players may hold more than one non-FIFA nationality.

No.	Pos.	Nation	Player

=== Olimpik Donetsk ===
In: Note: Flags indicate national team as defined under FIFA eligibility rules; some limited exceptions apply. Players may hold more than one non-FIFA nationality.

No.	Pos.	Nation	Player
-	MF	UKR	Vyacheslav Koydan (from FC Chernihiv)
-	FW	UKR	Ihor Kirienko (from Dinaz Vyshhorod)

Out: Note: Flags indicate national team as defined under FIFA eligibility rules; some limited exceptions apply. Players may hold more than one non-FIFA nationality.

No.	Pos.	Nation	Player
-	MF	UKR	Yevhen Tsymbalyuk (to Desna Chernihiv)
-	MF	UKR	Taras Zaviyskyi (to Desna Chernihiv)

=== Polissya Zhytomyr ===
In: Note: Flags indicate national team as defined under FIFA eligibility rules; some limited exceptions apply. Players may hold more than one non-FIFA nationality.

No.	Pos.	Nation	Player
-	GK	UKR	Anatoliy Tymofeyev (from FC Chernihiv)
-	DF	UKR	Andriy Hitchenko (from Desna Chernihiv)
-	DF	UKR	Vladyslav Ohirya (from Desna Chernihiv)
-	DF	UKR	Vladyslav Shapoval (from Ahrobiznes Volochysk)
-	DF	UKR	Artem Kozak (from Chornomorets Odesa)
-	GK	UKR	Zauri Makharadze (from Dnipro-1)
-	MF	UKR	Andriy Sakhnevych (from (Latvia) Ventspils)
-	MF	UKR	Illya Cherednychenko (from Hirnyk-Sport Horishni Plavni)

Out: Note: Flags indicate national team as defined under FIFA eligibility rules; some limited exceptions apply. Players may hold more than one non-FIFA nationality.

No.	Pos.	Nation	Player
-	FW	UKR	Yaroslav Halenko (to LNZ Cherkasy)
-	FW	UKR	Denys Halenkov (to Karpaty Lviv)

=== Podillya Khmelnytskyi ===
In: Note: Flags indicate national team as defined under FIFA eligibility rules; some limited exceptions apply. Players may hold more than one non-FIFA nationality.

No.	Pos.	Nation	Player

Out: Note: Flags indicate national team as defined under FIFA eligibility rules; some limited exceptions apply. Players may hold more than one non-FIFA nationality.

No.	Pos.	Nation	Player
-	FW	UKR	Yuriy Maley (to Dinaz Vyshhorod)

=== VPK-Ahro Shevchenkivka ===
In: Note: Flags indicate national team as defined under FIFA eligibility rules; some limited exceptions apply. Players may hold more than one non-FIFA nationality.

No.	Pos.	Nation	Player
-	GK	UKR	Illya Karavashchenko (On Loan from Desna Chernihiv)
-	GK	UKR	Kostyantyn Makhnovskyi (from (Latvia) Ventspils)
-	GK	UKR	Viktor Babichyn (on loan from Rukh Lviv)
-	MF	UKR	Ivan Lytvynenko (on loan from Rukh Lviv)

Out: Note: Flags indicate national team as defined under FIFA eligibility rules; some limited exceptions apply. Players may hold more than one non-FIFA nationality.

No.	Pos.	Nation	Player
-	MF	GEO	Giorgi Gadrani (to (Georgia (country)) FC Samtredia)
-	DF	UKR	Ivan Bilyi (to Olimpik Donetsk)
-	GK	UKR	Illya Karavashchenko (Loan return to Desna Chernihiv)

== Ukrainian Second League ==
=== FC Chernihiv ===
In: Note: Flags indicate national team as defined under FIFA eligibility rules; some limited exceptions apply. Players may hold more than one non-FIFA nationality.

No.	Pos.	Nation	Player
-	GK	UKR	Artem Padun (from Avangard Korukivka)
-	DF	UKR	Igor Samoylenko (from Desna-2 Chernihiv)
-	DF	UKR	Maksym Shumylo (from Desna-3 Chernihiv)
-	MF	UKR	Andriy Porokhnya (from FC Kudrivka)
-	MF	UKR	Mykyta Hrebenshchykov (from Yunist Chernihiv)
-	FW	UKR	Bohdan Lytvynenko (from Desna-3 Chernihiv)
-	FW	UKR	Denys Kildiy (from Yunist Chernihiv)

Out: Note: Flags indicate national team as defined under FIFA eligibility rules; some limited exceptions apply. Players may hold more than one non-FIFA nationality.

No.	Pos.	Nation	Player
-	GK	UKR	Anatoliy Tymofeyev (to Polissya Zhytomyr)
-	GK	UKR	Artem Lutchenko (Retired)
-	DF	UKR	Denys Sadovyi
-	DF	UKR	Anatoliy Naumenko
-	DF	GEO	Teymuraz Mchedlishvili (Retired)
-	DF	UKR	Oleksandr Konopko (Retired)
-	MF	UKR	Vyacheslav Koydan (to Olimpik Donetsk)

=== Dinaz Vyshhorod ===
In:

No.	Pos.	Nation	Player
—	GK	UKR	Vladyslav Levanidov (from Volyn Lutsk)
—	MF	UKR	Yevhen Chepurnenko (from Desna Chernihiv)
—	FW	UKR	Yuriy Maley (from Podillya Khmelnytskyi)

Out: Note: Flags indicate national team as defined under FIFA eligibility rules; some limited exceptions apply. Players may hold more than one non-FIFA nationality.

No.	Pos.	Nation	Player
-	MF	UKR	Yevheniy Belych (loan return to Desna-2 Chernihiv)
-	MF	UKR	Ivan Trubochkin (to Olimpik Donetsk)
-	MF	UKR	Volodymyr Dmytrenko
-	FW	UKR	Ihor Kirienko (to Olimpik Donetsk)

=== Dnipro Cherkasy ===
In:

No.	Pos.	Nation	Player
—	DF	UKR	Pavlo Shostka (from Desna Chernihiv)

Out: Note: Flags indicate national team as defined under FIFA eligibility rules; some limited exceptions apply. Players may hold more than one non-FIFA nationality.

No.	Pos.	Nation	Player

=== SC Chaika ===
In:

No.	Pos.	Nation	Player
—	MF	BRA	Nivaldo Rodrigues Ferreira (from (Belarus) Isloch Minsk)

Out: Note: Flags indicate national team as defined under FIFA eligibility rules; some limited exceptions apply. Players may hold more than one non-FIFA nationality.

No.	Pos.	Nation	Player

=== LNZ Cherkasy ===
In: Note: Flags indicate national team as defined under FIFA eligibility rules; some limited exceptions apply. Players may hold more than one non-FIFA nationality.

No.	Pos.	Nation	Player
-	MF	UKR	Oleksandr Volkov (from Desna Chernihiv)
-	FW	UKR	Yaroslav Halenko (from Polissya Zhytomyr)

Out: Note: Flags indicate national team as defined under FIFA eligibility rules; some limited exceptions apply. Players may hold more than one non-FIFA nationality.

No.	Pos.	Nation	Player
-	MF	UKR	Ihor Buka
-	DF	UKR	Mykhaylo Kaluhin
-	FW	UKR	Bohdan Kovalenko

=== Karpaty Halych ===
In: Note: Flags indicate national team as defined under FIFA eligibility rules; some limited exceptions apply. Players may hold more than one non-FIFA nationality.

No.	Pos.	Nation	Player

Out: Note: Flags indicate national team as defined under FIFA eligibility rules; some limited exceptions apply. Players may hold more than one non-FIFA nationality.

No.	Pos.	Nation	Player
-	MF	UKR	Mykhaylo Kozak

=== MFC Mykolaiv ===
In: Note: Flags indicate national team as defined under FIFA eligibility rules; some limited exceptions apply. Players may hold more than one non-FIFA nationality.

No.	Pos.	Nation	Player

Out: Note: Flags indicate national team as defined under FIFA eligibility rules; some limited exceptions apply. Players may hold more than one non-FIFA nationality.

No.	Pos.	Nation	Player
-	DF	UKR	Temur Partsvania (to (Kazakhstan) Zhetysu)

=== Livyi Bereh Kyiv ===
In: Note: Flags indicate national team as defined under FIFA eligibility rules; some limited exceptions apply. Players may hold more than one non-FIFA nationality.

No.	Pos.	Nation	Player
-	MF	UKR	Renat Mochulyak (from Desna Chernihiv)

Out: Note: Flags indicate national team as defined under FIFA eligibility rules; some limited exceptions apply. Players may hold more than one non-FIFA nationality.

No.	Pos.	Nation	Player
