= Dmytro Chernysh =

Dmytro Chernysh is the name of two Ukrainian football players:

- Dmytro Chernysh (footballer, born 1998), Ukrainian football goalkeeper
- Dmytro Chernysh (footballer, born 2004), Ukrainian football midfielder
