= Sheremeta =

Sheremeta (Ukrainian: Шеремета) is a unisex Ukrainian surname that may refer to the following notable people:

- Liubov Sheremeta (born 1980), Ukrainian artistic gymnast
- Pavlo Sheremeta, Ukrainian economist
- Tymofiy Sheremeta (born 1995), Ukrainian football goalkeeper
