= Dmytro Povoroznyuk =

Ukrainian footballer (born 1987)

Personal information
- Full name: Dmytro Ihorovych Povoroznyuk
- Date of birth: 14 September 1987 (age 39)
- Place of birth: Rovno, Ukrainian SSR, Soviet Union (now Ukraine)
- Height: 1.80 m (5 ft 11 in)
- Position: Centre-forward

Youth career
- 2000–2001: Olimp Rivne
- 2001–2004: Veres Rivne

Senior career*
Years	Team	Apps	(Gls)
2005	Veres-2 Rivne		
2006	Khimik Rivne	2	(0)
2016	Prodtorhobladnannya Zaborol		
2018	Prodtorhobladnannya Zaborol	1	(0)
2020	Sokil Mykhaylivka-Rubezhivka		
2020–2021	Veres Rivne	5	(0)
2022–2023	Veres Rivne	0	(0)
- * Club domestic league appearances and goals as of 20 July 2023

Dmytro Ihorovych Povoroznyuk (Ukrainian: Дмитро Ігорович Поворознюк; born 14 September 1987) is a Ukrainian former football journalist, former futsal player, YouTuber, and former professional footballer who last played as a centre-forward for Ukrainian club Veres Rivne.
