= Yevheniy Nikolashyn =

Ukrainian footballer

Personal information
- Full name: Yevheniy Andriyovych Nikolashyn
- Date of birth: 2 April 2003 (age 23)
- Place of birth: Kryvyi Rih, Ukraine
- Height: 1.86 m (6 ft 1 in)
- Position: Right winger

Team information
- Current team: Kryvbas Kryvyi Rih

Youth career
- 2014–2016: Hirnyk Kryvyi Rih
- 2016–2018: Dnipro
- 2018–2020: Hirnyk Kryvyi Rih
- 2020–2021: Kryvbas Kryvyi Rih

Senior career*
Years	Team	Apps	(Gls)
2020	Hirnyk Kryvyi Rih	0	(0)
2021–	Kryvbas Kryvyi Rih	1	(0)
2021	→ Lyubomyr Stavyshche (loan)	15	(1)
- * Club domestic league appearances and goals as of 17 December 2021

Yevheniy Andriyovych Nikolashyn (Ukrainian: Євгеній Андрійович Ніколашин; born 2 April 2003) is a Ukrainian professional footballer who plays as a right winger for Ukrainian club Kryvbas Kryvyi Rih.
