= Aleks Chidomere =

Ukrainian footballer

Personal information
- Full name: Aleks Chidomere
- Date of birth: 12 August 2002 (age 24)
- Place of birth: Kyiv, Ukraine
- Height: 1.86 m (6 ft 1 in)
- Position: Centre-forward

Team information
- Current team: Vorskla Poltava
- Number: 77

Youth career
- 2015–2016: Dynamo Kyiv
- 2016: Mal Korosten
- 2016–2017: Piddubny Olympic College
- 2017–2019: Zmina-Obolon Kyiv

Senior career*
Years	Team	Apps	(Gls)
2019–2022	Obolon Kyiv	7	(0)
2019–2021	→ Obolon-2 Bucha	15	(0)
2022–2025	Metalist Kharkiv	41	(6)
2025–	Vorskla Poltava	24	(1)

International career^{‡}
2019	Ukraine U18	4	(1)
- * Club domestic league appearances and goals as of 3 June 2026 ‡ National team caps and goals as of 17 January 2022

Aleks Chidomere (Ukrainian: Алекс Чідомере; born 12 August 2002) is a Ukrainian professional footballer who plays as a centre-forward for Ukrainian club Vorskla Poltava.
