= Mykyta Bezuhlyi =

Ukrainian footballer

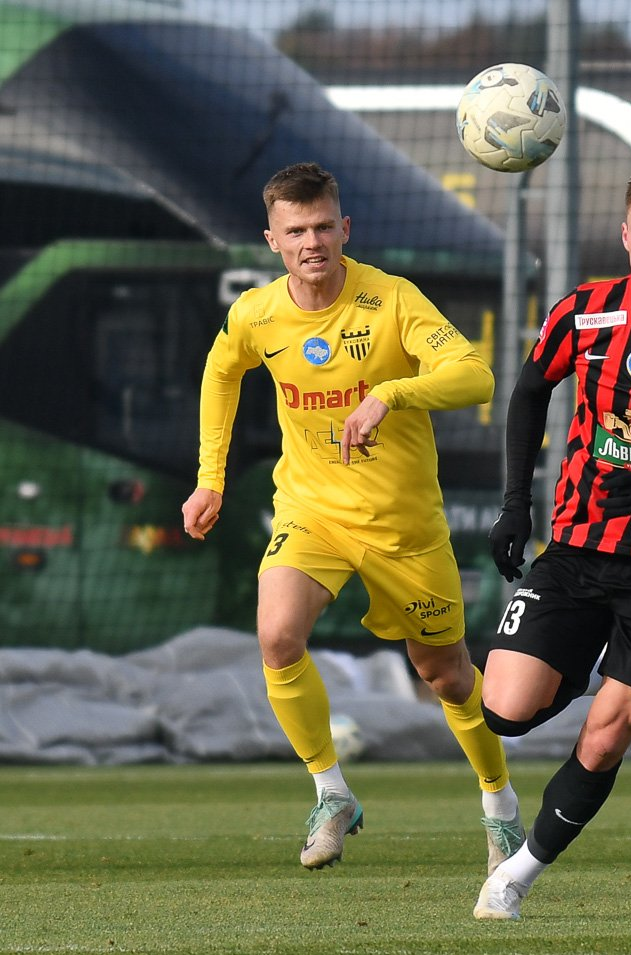

Personal information
- Full name: Mykyta Serhiyovych Bezuhlyi
- Date of birth: 1 August 1995 (age 31)
- Place of birth: Volnovakha, Ukraine
- Height: 1.86 m (6 ft 1 in)
- Position: Centre-back

Team information
- Current team: Bukovyna Chernivtsi
- Number: 3

Youth career
- 2009–2011: Olimpik Donetsk
- 2011–2012: Shakhtar Donetsk

Senior career*
| Years | Team | Apps | (Gls) |
| 2012–2017 | Shakhtar Donetsk | 0 | (0) |
| 2017–2021 | Obolon Kyiv | 107 | (6) |
| 2022–2024 | Metalist 1925 Kharkiv | 48 | (4) |
| 2024– | Bukovyna Chernivtsi | 40 | (4) |

International career^{‡}
| 2012 | Ukraine U18 | 5 | (0) |
| 2017 | Ukraine (student) | | |
- * Club domestic league appearances and goals as of 3 June 2026 ‡ National team caps and goals as of 17 January 2022

Mykyta Serhiyovych Bezuhlyi (Ukrainian: Микита Сергійович Безуглий; born 1 August 1995) is a Ukrainian professional footballer who plays as a centre-back for Bukovyna Chernivtsi.
