= Oleksiy Malaki =

Ukrainian footballer (born 2003)

Personal information
- Full name: Oleksiy Yuriyovych Malaki
- Date of birth: 28 February 2003 (age 23)
- Place of birth: Obukhiv, Ukraine
- Height: 1.82 m (6 ft 0 in)
- Position: Left-back

Team information
- Current team: Mynai
- Number: 22

Youth career
- 2015–2019: UFK-Karpaty Lviv
- 2019: DVUFK Dnipro
- 2019–2020: Kolos Kovalivka

Senior career*
Years	Team	Apps	(Gls)
2020–2023	Kolos Kovalivka	0	(0)
2022	→ Hirnyk-Sport Horishni Plavni (loan)	13	(0)
2023	→ Nyva Buzova (loan)	2	(0)
2023	Dinaz Vyshhorod	15	(1)
2024	FSC Mariupol	19	(1)
2025–	Mynai	9	(0)
- * Club domestic league appearances and goals as of 10 June 2025

Oleksiy Yuriyovych Malaki (Ukrainian: Олексій Юрійович Малакі; born 28 February 2003) is a Ukrainian professional footballer who plays as a left-back for Ukrainian First League club Mynai.
