= Denys Byelousov =

Ukrainian football striker

Personal information
- Full name: Denys Olehovych Byelousov
- Date of birth: 6 November 1996 (age 30)
- Place of birth: Luhansk, Ukraine
- Height: 1.79 m (5 ft 10 in)
- Position: Right winger

Youth career
- 2009–2013: LVUFK Luhansk

Senior career*
Years	Team	Apps	(Gls)
2013–2017	Zorya Luhansk	0	(0)
2017	Avanhard Kramatorsk	12	(0)
2018	Kremin Kremenchuk	28	(3)
2019	Myr Hornostayivka	10	(1)
2019–2020	Metalurh Zaporizhzhia	37	(4)
2021–2022	Kremin Kremenchuk	27	(0)
2022	Ahrobiznes Volochysk	0	(0)

International career
2015	Ukraine U19	2	(0)
- * Club domestic league appearances and goals as of 30 July 2023

Denys Olehovych Byelousov (Ukrainian: Денис Олегович Бєлоусов; born 6 November 1996) is a Ukrainian professional footballer who plays as a right winger.

== Career ==
=== Early years ===
Byelousov is a product of the LVUFK Luhansk youth sportive school.

=== Zorya Luhansk ===
In 2013 he signed a contract with Ukrainian Zorya Luhansk and played in the Ukrainian Premier League Reserves until 2017.

=== Avanhard Kramatorsk ===
In August 2017 he signed a one-year contract with Avanhard Kramatorsk in the Ukrainian First League. He made his debut as a start-squad player for Avanhard Kramatorsk in the Ukrainian First League in the match against Poltava on 5 August 2017.
