= Dmytro Kapinus =

Ukrainian footballer

Personal information
- Full name: Dmytro Ivanovych Kapinus
- Date of birth: 28 April 2003 (age 23)
- Place of birth: Cherkasy, Ukraine
- Height: 1.79 m (5 ft 10 in)
- Position: Right-back

Team information
- Current team: FC Obolon Kyiv (Loan from FC Kharkiv until 30/6/27)
- Number: 2

Youth career
- 2009–2016: Dnipro-80 Cherkasy
- 2016–2017: Metalist Kharkiv
- 2017–2019: Shakhtar Donetsk

Senior career*
Years	Team	Apps	(Gls)
2019–2024	Shakhtar Donetsk	0	(0)
2022–2024	→ Metalist 1925 Kharkiv (loan)	38	(1)
2024–	Metalist 1925 Kharkiv	24	(0)
2026-	FC Obolon Kyiv (Loan)	6	(0)

International career^{‡}
2020	Ukraine U17	3	(0)
2022–	Ukraine U21	1	(0)
- * Club domestic league appearances and goals as of 4 October 2026 @ 14:55(AEST) ‡ National team caps and goals as of 22 February 2024

Dmytro Ivanovych Kapinus (Ukrainian: Дмитро Іванович Капінус; born 28 April 2003) is a Ukrainian professional footballer who plays as a right-back for Metalist 1925 Kharkiv.

== Career ==
=== Early years ===
Born in Cherkasy, Kapinus began his career in the local Dnipro-80 from the age 6 and then continued in the Metalist Kharkiv and the Shakhtar Donetsk youth sportive school systems. He played in the Ukrainian Premier League Reserves and never made his debut for the senior Shakhtar Donetsk squad.

=== Metalist 1925 Kharkiv ===
In January 2022, he signed a on loan deal with the Ukrainian Premier League side Metalist 1925 Kharkiv and made his debut in the Ukrainian Premier League as a second half-time substituted player in a home match against Chornomorets Odesa on 27 August 2022.
