= Andriy Kokhman =

Ukrainian footballer

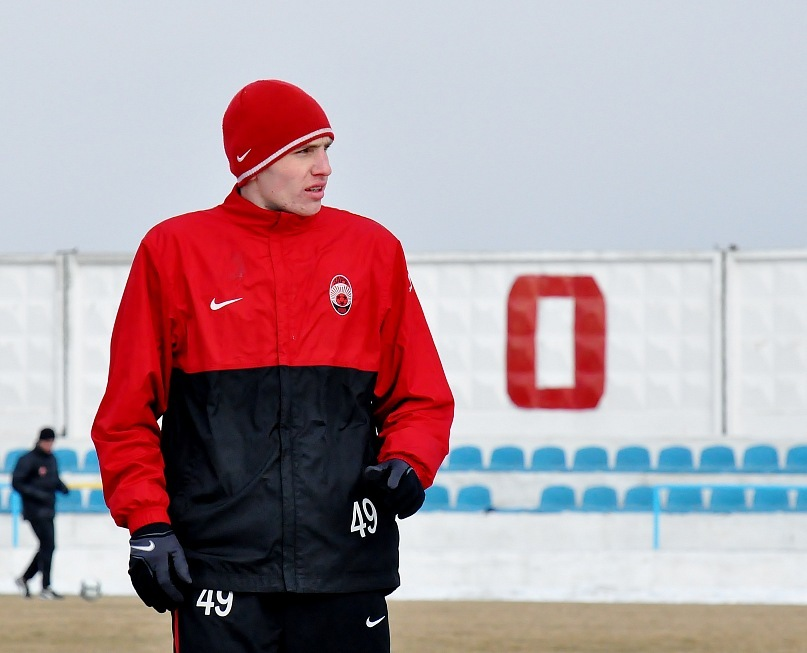

Personal information
- Full name: Andriy Volodymyrovych Kokhman
- Date of birth: 25 May 1990 (age 36)
- Place of birth: Zabuzhzhya, Lviv Oblast, Soviet Union (now Ukraine)
- Height: 1.87 m (6 ft 2 in)
- Position: Attacking midfielder

Team information
- Current team: Prykarpattia Ivano-Frankivsk
- Number: 29

Youth career
- 2004–2006: UFK-Karpaty Lviv
- 2006–2008: Sokil-Rukh Lviv

Senior career*
Years	Team	Apps	(Gls)
2008–2012	Zorya Luhansk	2	(0)
2010	→ Zorya-2 Luhansk	0	(0)
2013	Kremin Kremenchuk	0	(0)
2014	Enerhiya Nova Kakhovka	0	(0)
2014–2016	Skala Stryi	35	(6)
2016–2017	Bukovyna Chernivtsi	12	(0)
2017–2018	Rochyn Sosnivka	46	(10)
2018–2020	Kalush	38	(4)
2020	Yunist Verkhnya	0	(0)
2020–	Prykarpattia Ivano-Frankivsk	23	(0)
2021	→ Uzhhorod (loan)	3	(0)
- * Club domestic league appearances and goals as of 17 February 2022

Andriy Volodymyrovych Kokhman (Ukrainian: Андрій Володимирович Кохман; born 25 May 1990) is a Ukrainian professional footballer who plays as an attacking midfielder for Ukrainian club Prykarpattia Ivano-Frankivsk.
