= Illya Hulko =

Ukrainian footballer

Personal information
- Full name: Illya Serhiyovych Hulko
- Date of birth: 17 November 2002 (age 23)
- Place of birth: Luhansk, Ukraine
- Height: 1.83 m (6 ft 0 in)
- Position: Defensive midfielder

Team information
- Current team: Zorya Luhansk
- Number: 6

Youth career
- 2008–2015: Zorya Luhansk
- 2015–2018: Torpedo Mykolaiv
- 2018–2019: Shakhtar Donetsk

Senior career*
Years	Team	Apps	(Gls)
2019–2022	Shakhtar Donetsk	0	(0)
2022	→ Mariupol (loan)	0	(0)
2022	→ Lokomotiva Zagreb (loan)	0	(0)
2022–	Zorya Luhansk	2	(0)
2024	→ Nyva Buzova (loan)	8	(0)
2024	→ Mynai (loan)	4	(0)
- * Club domestic league appearances and goals as of 31 December 2024

Illya Serhiyovych Hulko (Ukrainian: Ілля Сергійович Гулько; born 17 November 2002) is a Ukrainian professional footballer who plays as a defensive midfielder for Zorya Luhansk.

== Career ==
=== Early years ===
Born in Luhansk, Hulko began his career in the Zorya Luhansk academy from his native city. Then he continued in the Torpedo Mykolaiv and Shakhtar Donetsk academies.

=== Shakhtar Donetsk ===
He played only in the Ukrainian Premier League Reserves and never made his debut for Shakhtar Donetsk in the Ukrainian Premier League.

=== Zorya Luhansk ===
In September 2022 he signed a contract with his native side Zorya Luhansk and made his debut in the Ukrainian Premier League as a second-half substitute in an away victory over Metalist 1925 Kharkiv on 28 October.
