= Ihor Semenyna =

Ukrainian footballer

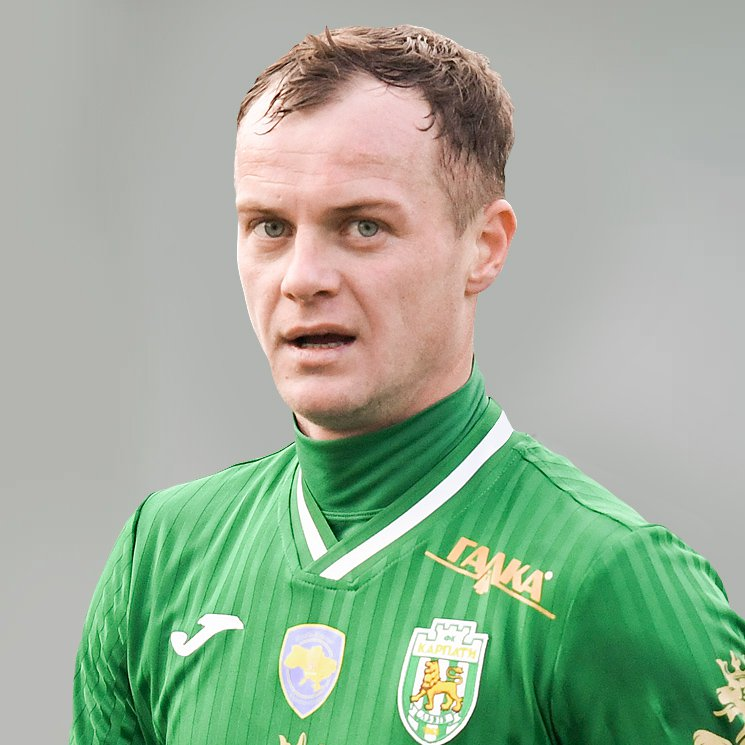

Personal information
- Full name: Ihor Bohdanovych Semenyna
- Date of birth: 1 January 1989 (age 37)
- Place of birth: Ternopil, Soviet Union (now Ukraine)
- Height: 1.77 m (5 ft 10 in)
- Position: Midfielder

Team information
- Current team: Holešov
- Number: 13

Youth career
- Youth Sportive School Ternopil

Senior career*
Years	Team	Apps	(Gls)
2007–2009	Nyva Ternopil	44	(3)
2010	Feniks-Illichovets Kalinine	17	(0)
2010	Naftovyk-Ukrnafta Okhtyrka	6	(0)
2011	Lviv	2	(0)
2011	Enerhetyk Burshtyn	20	(1)
2012	Mykolaiv	32	(7)
2013–2015	Olimpik Donetsk	57	(8)
2016–2017	Cherkaskyi Dnipro	24	(4)
2017	Helios Kharkiv	12	(0)
2018–2019	Mykolaiv	51	(9)
2019	→ Mykolaiv-2	3	(1)
2020	Krystal Kherson	14	(3)
2021–2021	Nyva Ternopil	31	(7)
2022	Karpaty Lviv	0	(0)
2022–	Holešov		
- * Club domestic league appearances and goals as of 7 June 2022

Ihor Bohdanovych Semenyna (Ukrainian: Ігор Богданович Семенина; born 1 January 1989) is a Ukrainian professional football midfielder who plays for Holešov.

== Career ==
Semenyna is a product of the Youth Sportive School Ternopil and spent time playing for different Ukrainian teams. His first trainers were Bohdan Buchynskyi and Andriy Yablonskyi. In 2013, he signed a contract with FC Olimpik Donetsk.
