= Denys Pidruchnyi =

Ukrainian footballer

Personal information
- Full name: Denys Vadymovych Pidruchnyi
- Date of birth: 10 July 2001 (age 25)
- Place of birth: Kyiv, Ukraine
- Height: 1.71 m (5 ft 7 1/2 in)
- Position: Midfielder

Team information
- Current team: Metalist Kharkiv
- Number: 5

Youth career
- 2010–2016: Obolon-Zmina Kyiv
- 2016–2017: Shakhtar Donetsk
- 2017–2018: Piddubny Olympic College

Senior career*
Years	Team	Apps	(Gls)
2018–2019	Stumbras	5	(0)
2018	→ Stumbras B	14	(1)
2020–2022	Oleksandriya	0	(0)
2021	→ Kramatorsk (loan)	20	(0)
2022–2023	Hirnyk-Sport Horishni Plavni	22	(2)
2023–	Metalist Kharkiv	56	(3)

International career^{‡}
2016	Ukraine U15	2	(0)
2016–2017	Ukraine U16	10	(0)
2017–2018	Ukraine U17	7	(0)
2018	Ukraine U18	4	(0)
2019	Ukraine U19	2	(0)
- * Club domestic league appearances and goals as of 4 June 2026 ‡ National team caps and goals as of 2 June 2022

Denys Pidruchnyi (Ukrainian: Денис Вадимович Підручний; born 10 July 2001) is a professional Ukrainian football midfielder who plays for Metalist Kharkiv.

== Career ==
Born in Kyiv, Pidruchnyi began to play football in his native city, where he joined local Obolon-Zmina youth sportive school.

After spent two years in Lithuania, he returned to Ukraine and in February 2020 signed contract with FC Oleksandriya and played in the Ukrainian Premier League Reserves competition.
