= Vladyslav Hromenko =

Ukrainian footballer

Personal information
- Full name: Vladyslav Anatoliyovych Hromenko
- Date of birth: 16 December 2002 (age 23)
- Place of birth: Pyriatyn, Ukraine
- Height: 1.74 m (5 ft 9 in)
- Position: Midfielder

Team information
- Current team: Khust
- Number: 77

Youth career
- 2014–2017: Youth Sportive School Pyriatyn
- 2017–2019: Vorskla Poltava

Senior career*
Years	Team	Apps	(Gls)
2019	DYuFSh Vorskla Poltava	9	(1)
2019–2021	Vorskla Poltava	0	(0)
2021	Rubikon Kyiv	3	(0)
2021	→ Olimpik Donetsk (loan)	0	(0)
2021–2024	Hirnyk-Sport Horishni Plavni	14	(1)
2024–	Khust	1	(0)
- * Club domestic league appearances and goals as of 3 July 2024

Vladyslav Anatoliyovych Hromenko (Ukrainian: Владислав Анатолійович Громенко; born 16 December 2002) is a Ukrainian football midfielder who plays for Khust.

== Career ==
Born in Pyriatyn, Hromenko is a product of the local youth sportive school and Vorskla Poltava system.

Hromenko was a member of Ukrainian Premier League clubs Vorskla and Olimpik Donetsk, but he not made his debut for Vorskla or Olimpik in the Ukrainian Premier League, but only played in the Ukrainian Premier League Reserves.
