= Myroslav Znovenko =

Ukrainian footballer

Personal information
- Full name: Myroslav Kostyantynovych Znovenko
- Date of birth: 26 February 2002 (age 24)
- Place of birth: Luhansk, Ukraine
- Height: 1.93 m (6 ft 4 in)
- Position: Goalkeeper

Team information
- Current team: Zarya Lugansk
- Number: 23

Youth career
- –2013: Zorya Luhansk
- 2013–2017: Metalist Kharkiv
- 2017–2018: Dnipro

Senior career*
Years	Team	Apps	(Gls)
2018–2019	Dnipro	17	(0)
2019–2023	Dnipro-1	0	(0)
2021–2022	→ Nikopol (loan)	13	(0)
2022–2023	→ Metalist Kharkiv (loan)	0	(0)
2024–2025	Zarya Lugansk		
2025	Kolkheti Poti	0	(0)
2025	Zarya Lugansk		
2026–	Zarya Lugansk	6	(0)

International career^{‡}
2020	Ukraine U18	4	(0)
2021	Ukraine U21	1	(0)
- * Club domestic league appearances and goals as of 31 October 2026 ‡ National team caps and goals as of 12 June 2023

Myroslav Kostyantynovych Znovenko (Ukrainian: Мирослав Костянтинович Зновенко; born 26 February 2002) is a Ukrainian and Russian professional footballer who plays for Zarya Lugansk.

== Career ==
Born in Luhansk, Znovenko is a product of the local Zorya Luhansk and also Metalist Kharkiv and Dnipro academies and in August 2019 he signed a contract with Ukrainian side Dnipro-1 and played for its in the Ukrainian Premier League Reserves and Under 19 Championship.

Starting from 2021, he played on loan first as a main choice goalkeeper of Nikopol in the Ukrainian Second League, and later in Metalist Kharkiv in the Ukrainian Premier League.
