= Oleksandr Kozhevnikov =

Ukrainian footballer

Personal information
- Full name: Oleksandr Dmytrovych Kozhevnikov
- Date of birth: 17 April 2000 (age 26)
- Place of birth: Poltava, Ukraine
- Height: 1.78 m (5 ft 10 in)
- Position: Right winger

Team information
- Current team: Nesebar
- Number: 19

Youth career
- 2013–2018: Vorskla Poltava

Senior career*
Years	Team	Apps	(Gls)
2018–2019	Vorskla Poltava	0	(0)
2019–2021	Mariupol	1	(0)
2021–2022	Vorskla Poltava	1	(0)
2021	→ Hirnyk-Sport Horishni Plavni (loan)	9	(0)
2022	Narva Trans	28	(6)
2024	Riteriai	13	(0)
2024–	Nesebar	10	(0)

International career^{‡}
2017	Ukraine U17	2	(0)
2018	Ukraine U18	1	(0)
- * Club domestic league appearances and goals as of 31 December 2024 ‡ National team caps and goals as of 8 April 2022

Oleksandr Dmytrovych Kozhevnikov (Ukrainian: Олександр Дмитрович Кожевніков; born 17 April 2000) is a Ukrainian professional footballer who plays as a right winger for Nesebar.

== Career ==
Kozhevnikov is a product of his native Vorskla Poltava youth sportive school system.

In July 2019 he was transferred to another Ukrainian Premier League side FC Mariupol and made his debut for in the Ukrainian Premier League as a second half-time substituted player in the drawing away match against FC Rukh Lviv on 20 November 2020. In March 2021 he returned to Vorskla Poltava.
