= Mykyta Turbayevskyi =

Ukrainian footballer

Personal information
- Full name: Mykyta Anatoliyovych Turbayevskyi
- Date of birth: 12 March 2002 (age 24)
- Place of birth: Donetsk, Ukraine
- Height: 1.93 m (6 ft 4 in)
- Position: Goalkeeper

Team information
- Current team: Zorya Luhansk
- Number: 12

Youth career
- 2014–2020: Shakhtar Donetsk

Senior career*
Years	Team	Apps	(Gls)
2020–2022	Shakhtar Donetsk	0	(0)
2021–2022	→ Mariupol (loan)	6	(0)
2022	→ Lokomotiva Zagreb (loan)	1	(0)
2022–	Zorya Luhansk	31	(0)

International career^{‡}
2017	Ukraine U15	1	(0)
2018	Ukraine U17	1	(0)
2021–	Ukraine U21	2	(0)
- * Club domestic league appearances and goals as of 3 June 2026 ‡ National team caps and goals as of 29 September 2022

Mykyta Anatoliyovych Turbayevskyi (Ukrainian: Микита Анатолійович Турбаєвський; born 12 March 2002) is a Ukrainian professional footballer who plays as a goalkeeper for Zorya Luhansk.

== Career ==
=== Shakhtar Donetsk ===
Born in Donetsk, Turbayevskyi is a product of the local Shakhtar Donetsk youth sportive school system. In 2019, Turbayevskyi was named "Goalkeeper of the Tournament" in the CEE Cup. He played in the Ukrainian Premier League Reserves and never made his debut for the senior Shakhtar Donetsk's squad.

==== Loan to Mariupol ====
In July 2021, Turbayevskyi signed one year loan contract with the Ukrainian Premier League's side Mariupol and made the debut for this team as the start squad player in the away winning match against FC Volyn Lutsk on 22 September 2021 in the Round of 32 of the Ukrainian Cup. One month later, he made his debut in the Ukrainian Premier League as the start squad player in the home match against FC Dynamo Kyiv on 30 October 2021.

== Career statistics ==
As of 29 December 2021

Appearances and goals by club, season and competition
Club	Season	League			Cup		Continental		Other		Total	
Club	Season	Division	Apps	Goals	Apps	Goals	Apps	Goals	Apps	Goals	Apps	Goals
Mariupol (loan)	2021–22	Ukrainian Premier League	6	0	2	0	—		—		8	0
Mariupol (loan)	Total		6	0	2	0	—		—		8	0
Career total			6	0	2	0	0	0	0	0	8	0
