= Tymofiy Sheremeta =

Ukrainian footballer

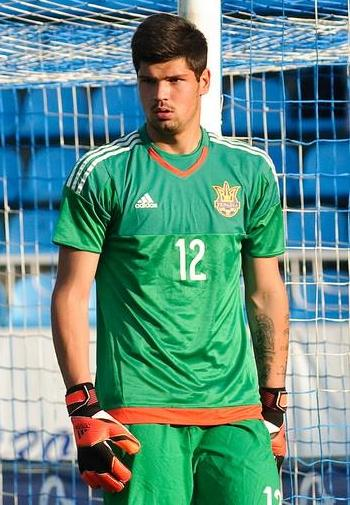

Personal information
- Full name: Tymofiy Oleksandrovych Sheremeta
- Date of birth: 6 October 1995 (age 31)
- Place of birth: Khmelnytskyi, Ukraine
- Height: 1.87 m (6 ft 2 in)
- Position: Goalkeeper

Youth career
- 2009–2011: Podillya Khmelnytskyi
- 2011–2012: Metalurh Zaporizhzhia

Senior career*
| Years | Team | Apps | (Gls) |
| 2012–2015 | Metalurh Zaporizhzhia | 6 | (0) |
| 2012 | → Metalurh-2 Zaporizhzhia | 2 | (0) |
| 2016 | Lutsk (amateurs) | 1 | (0) |
| 2016–2018 | Trakai | 18 | (0) |
| 2016–2018 | Trakai B | 27 | (0) |
| 2019 | Lokomotiv Yerevan | 19 | (0) |
| 2020–2021 | Uzhhorod | 0 | (0) |
| 2021 | Košice | 1 | (0) |
| 2021–2022 | Olimpik Donetsk | 7 | (0) |

International career^{‡}
| 2015 | Ukraine U21 | 7 | (0) |
- * Club domestic league appearances and goals as of 12 February 2022 ‡ National team caps and goals as of 1 September 2021

Tymofiy Oleksandrovych Sheremeta (Ukrainian: Тимофій Олександрович Шеремета; born 6 October 1995) is a Ukrainian professional footballer who plays as a goalkeeper.

== Career ==
Sheremeta is a product of Podillya and Metalurh Zaporizhzhia Youth Sportive School Systems. His first coaches were Oleksandr Porytskyi (at Podillya) and Oleksandr Rudyka (at Metalurh).

He made his debut for Metalurh Zaporizhzhia in the Ukrainian Premier League in the match against Dynamo Kyiv on 30 May 2015.

In 2019, Sheremeta joined Armenian club Lokomotiv Yerevan.
