= Valeriy Blazhko =

Ukrainian footballer

Personal information
- Full name: Valeriy Andriyovych Blazhko
- Date of birth: 22 March 2001 (age 25)
- Place of birth: Kharkiv, Ukraine
- Height: 1.85 m (6 ft 1 in)
- Position: Forward

Team information
- Current team: Metalist 1925 Kharkiv

Youth career
- 2013–2018: Metalist Kharkiv
- 2019: Avanhard Kharkiv

Senior career*
Years	Team	Apps	(Gls)
2018	Metalist Yunior	0	(0)
2020–2021	Mladá Boleslav B	1	(0)
2021–	Metalist 1925 Kharkiv	9	(1)
2021	→ Kramatorsk (loan)	10	(0)
- * Club domestic league appearances and goals as of 13 December 2021 ‡ National team caps and goals as of 28 August 2021

Valeriy Andriyovych Blazhko (Ukrainian: Валерій Андрійович Блажко; born 22 March 2001) is a professional Ukrainian footballer who plays as a forward for Metalist 1925 Kharkiv.
