= Dmytro Chernysh (footballer, born 1998) =

Ukrainian footballer

Personal information
- Full name: Dmytro Valeriyovych Chernysh
- Date of birth: 1 April 1998 (age 28)
- Place of birth: Kryvyi Rih, Ukraine
- Height: 1.90 m (6 ft 3 in)
- Position: Goalkeeper

Youth career
- 2011–2015: Shakhtar Kryvyi Rih

Senior career*
Years	Team	Apps	(Gls)
2016	Hirnyk Kryvyi Rih	0	(0)
2016	→ Hirnyk-2 Kryvyi Rih (amateurs)	9	(0)
2016–2017	Oleksandriya	0	(0)
2017	Poltava	0	(0)
2017–2018	Inhulets-2 Petrove	1	(0)
2018–2020	Hirnyk Kryvyi Rih	17	(0)
2020–2022	Kryvbas Kryvyi Rih	1	(0)
2021	→ Lyubomyr Stavyshche (loan)	14	(0)
- * Club domestic league appearances and goals as of 17 December 2021

Dmytro Valeriyovych Chernysh (Ukrainian: Дмитро Валерійович Черниш; born 1 April 1998) is a Ukrainian professional footballer who plays as a goalkeeper.
