= Andriy Vyskrebentsev =

Ukrainian footballer

Personal information
- Full name: Andriy Eduardovych Vyskrebentsev
- Date of birth: 27 October 2000 (age 26)
- Place of birth: Makiivka, Ukraine
- Height: 1.84 m (6 ft 0 in)
- Position: Midfielder

Youth career
- 2013–2015: Metalurh Donetsk
- 2015–2019: Mariupol

Senior career*
Years	Team	Apps	(Gls)
2019–2021	Mariupol	2	(0)
2021	→ Uzhhorod (loan)	16	(0)
2022	Slutsk	19	(0)
2023–2024	Zvezda Saint Petersburg	39	(3)
2024–2025	Murom	33	(2)
2025–2026	Leningradets	14	(1)
- * Club domestic league appearances and goals as of 13 June 2026

Andriy Eduardovych Vyskrebentsev (Ukrainian: Андрій Едуардович Вискребенцев; born 27 October 2000) is a Ukrainian professional football midfielder.

== Career ==
Vyskrebentsev is a product mainly of Metalurh Donetsk and FC Mariupol youth sportive school systems.

He made his debut for FC Mariupol in the Ukrainian Premier League as a substituted player in a match against defending champion FC Shakhtar Donetsk on 1 December 2019.
