= Dmytro Heyko =

Ukrainian footballer

Dmytro Heiko
Personal information
- Full name: Dmytro Vadymovych Heiko
- Date of birth: 10 January 2000 (age 26)
- Place of birth: Odesa, Ukraine
- Height: 1.85 m (6 ft 1 in)
- Position: Defender

Team information
- Current team: Blau-Weiß Friesdorf
- Number: 66

Youth career
- 2013–2018: Chornomorets Odesa

Senior career*
Years	Team	Apps	(Gls)
2018–2022	Chornomorets Odesa	2	(0)
2019	→ Chornomorets-2 Odesa	18	(0)
2021	→ Balkany Zorya (loan)	1	(0)
2022–	Blau-Weiß Friesdorf	55	(0)

International career
2016	Ukraine U16		
2017	Ukraine U17		
2018	Ukraine U18		
- * Club domestic league appearances and goals as of 13 November 2022

Dmytro Vadymovych Heiko (Ukrainian: Дмитро Вадимович Гейко; born 10 January 2000) is a professional Ukrainian football defender who plays for German Mittelrheinliga club Blau-Weiß Friesdorf.

== Career ==
Born in Odesa, Heyko is a product of the local Chornomorets Odesa youth sportive school system.

In July 2018 he was promoted to the Chornomorets Odesa main squad. He made his debut as a start squad player for Chornomorets in the Ukrainian First League in an away drawing match against FC Alians Lypova Dolyna on 20 November 2020.
