= 2020–21 in Ukrainian football =

Football in Ukraine
- Season: 2020–21

Men's football
- Premier League: Dynamo Kyiv
- First League: Veres Rivne
- Second League: Podillya Khmelnytskyi (Group A); Metal Kharkiv (Group B)
- AAFU: LNZ-Lebedyn
- Cup: Dynamo Kyiv
- Amateur Cup: LNZ-Lebedyn
- Super Cup: Dynamo Kyiv

Women's football
- Vyshcha Liha: Zhytlobud-1 Kharkiv
- Persha Liha: Kolos Kovalivka
- Women's Cup: Zhytlobud-2 Kharkiv

The 2020–21 season was the 30th season of competitive association football in Ukraine since dissolution of the Soviet Union.

== National teams ==
=== Ukraine national football team ===
==== Friendlies ====
| 7 October 2020 Friendly | France | 7–1 | Ukraine | Paris, France |
| | Camavinga 9'; Giroud 24', 34'; Mykolenko 39' (o.g.); Tolisso 65'; Mbappé 82'; Griezmann 89' | Report | Tsyhankov 53' | Stadium: Stade de France; Referee: Andris Treimanis (Latvia) |

| 11 November 2020 Friendly | Poland | 2–0 | Ukraine | Chorzów, Poland |
| 20:45 | Piątek 40'; Moder 63' | Report | | Stadium: Silesian Stadium; Attendance: 0 Referee: Manuel Schüttengruber (Austria) |

| 23 May 2021 Friendly | Ukraine | 1–1 | Bahrain | Kharkiv, Ukraine |
| | Tsyhankov 90+1' | Report | Dhiya Saeed 75' (pen.) | Stadium: Metalist Stadium; Referee: Pavel Orel (Czech Republic) |

| 3 June 2021 Friendly | Ukraine | 1–0 | Northern Ireland | Dnipro, Ukraine |
| | Zubkov 10' | Report | | Stadium: Dnipro-Arena; Referee: Szymon Marciniak (Poland) |

| 7 June 2021 Friendly | Ukraine | 4–0 | Cyprus | Kharkiv, Ukraine |
| | Yarmolenko 37' (pen.), 65'; Zinchenko 45+2' (pen.); Yaremchuk 59' | Report | | Stadium: Metalist Stadium; Referee: Vitālijs Spasjoņņikovs (Latvia) |

==== UEFA Nations League ====
===== Group 4 =====
| Pos | Team | Pld | W | D | L | GF | GA | GD | Pts | Qualification or relegation | (Spain) | (Germany) | (Switzerland) | (Ukraine) |
|---|---|---|---|---|---|---|---|---|---|---|---|---|---|---|
| 1 | Spain | 6 | 3 | 2 | 1 | 13 | 3 | +10 | 11 | Qualification for Nations League Finals | — | 6–0 | 1–0 | 4–0 |
| 2 | Germany | 6 | 2 | 3 | 1 | 10 | 13 | −3 | 9 | | 1–1 | — | 3–3 | 3–1 |
| 3 | Switzerland | 6 | 1 | 3 | 2 | 9 | 8 | +1 | 6 (Note: Tied on head-to-head points (3). Head-to-head goal difference: Switzerland +2, Ukraine −2.) | | 1–1 | 1–1 | — | 3–0 (Note: The Switzerland v Ukraine match was awarded as a 3–0 win to Switzerland after being cancelled as Ukraine were placed in quarantine prior to the match due to positive SARS-CoV-2 tests in the team.) |
| 4 | Ukraine (R) | 6 | 2 | 0 | 4 | 5 | 13 | −8 | 6 | Relegation to League B | 1–0 | 1–2 | 2–1 | — |

Source: UEFA
(R) Relegated
Notes:

| 3 September 2020 2020–21 UEFA Nations League A | Ukraine | 2–1 | Switzerland | Lviv, Ukraine |
| 21:45 | Yarmolenko 14'; Zinchenko 68' | Report | Seferovic 41' | Stadium: Arena Lviv; Attendance: 0 Referee: Andreas Ekberg (Sweden) |

| 6 September 2020 2020–21 UEFA Nations League A | Spain | 4–0 | Ukraine | Madrid, Spain |
| 20:45 | Ramos 3' (pen.), 29'; Fati 32'; F. Torres 84' | Report | | Stadium: Alfredo Di Stéfano Stadium; Attendance: 0 Referee: Benoît Bastien (France) |

| 10 October 2020 2020–21 UEFA Nations League A | Ukraine | 1–2 | Germany | Kyiv, Ukraine |
| 21:45 | Malinovskyi 77' (pen.) | Report | Ginter 20'; Goretzka 49' | Stadium: NSK Olimpiyskiy; Attendance: 17,573; Referee: Orel Grinfeld (Israel) |

| 13 October 2020 2020–21 UEFA Nations League A | Ukraine | 1–0 | Spain | Kyiv, Ukraine |
| 21:45 | Tsyhankov 76' | Report | | Stadium: NSK Olimpiyskiy; Attendance: 10,495; Referee: Paweł Gil (Poland) |

| 14 November 2020 2020–21 UEFA Nations League A | Germany | 3–1 | Ukraine | Leipzig, Germany |
| 20:45 | Sané 23'; Werner 33', 64' | Report | Yaremchuk 12' | Stadium: Red Bull Arena; Attendance: 0 Referee: Ovidiu Hațegan (Romania) |

| 17 November 2020 2020–21 UEFA Nations League A | Switzerland | 3–0 (awd.) | Ukraine | Lucerne, Switzerland |
| | | Report | | Stadium: Swissporarena; Referee: Anastasios Sidiropoulos (Greece) |

==== 2022 FIFA World Cup ====
===== Group D =====
| Pos | Team | Pld | W | D | L | GF | GA | GD | Pts | Qualification | France | Ukraine | Finland | Bosnia and Herzegovina | Kazakhstan |
|---|---|---|---|---|---|---|---|---|---|---|---|---|---|---|---|
| 1 | France | 8 | 5 | 3 | 0 | 18 | 3 | +15 | 18 | Qualification for 2022 FIFA World Cup | — | 1–1 | 2–0 | 1–1 | 8–0 |
| 2 | Ukraine | 8 | 2 | 6 | 0 | 11 | 8 | +3 | 12 | Advance to play-offs | 1–1 | — | 1–1 | 1–1 | 1–1 |
| 3 | Finland | 8 | 3 | 2 | 3 | 10 | 10 | 0 | 11 | | 0–2 | 1–2 | — | 2–2 | 1–0 |
| 4 | Bosnia and Herzegovina | 8 | 1 | 4 | 3 | 9 | 12 | −3 | 7 | | 0–1 | 0–2 | 1–3 | — | 2–2 |
| 5 | Kazakhstan | 8 | 0 | 3 | 5 | 5 | 20 | −15 | 3 | | 0–2 | 2–2 | 0–2 | 0–2 | — |

Source: FIFA, UEFA
Rules for classification: Tiebreakers

| 24 March 2021 2022 FIFA World Cup qualification | France | 1–1 | Ukraine | Saint-Denis, France |
| 20:45 | Griezmann 19' | Report | Kimpembe 57' (o.g.) | Stadium: Stade de France; Attendance: 0 Referee: Tobias Stieler (Germany) |

| 28 March 2021 2022 FIFA World Cup qualification | Ukraine | 1–1 | Finland | Kyiv, Ukraine |
| 20:45 (21:45 UTC+3) | Moraes 80' | Report | Pukki 89' (pen.) | Stadium: NSK Olimpiyskiy; Attendance: 0 Referee: István Kovács (Romania) |

| 31 March 2021 2022 FIFA World Cup qualification | Ukraine | 1–1 | Kazakhstan | Kyiv, Ukraine |
| 20:45 (21:45 UTC+3) | Yaremchuk 20' | Report | Muzhikov 59' | Stadium: NSK Olimpiyskiy; Attendance: 0 Referee: Matej Jug (Slovenia) |

==== Group stage ====
Group C

| Pos | Team | Pld | W | D | L | GF | GA | GD | Pts | Qualification |
|---|---|---|---|---|---|---|---|---|---|---|
| 1 | Netherlands (H) | 3 | 3 | 0 | 0 | 8 | 2 | +6 | 9 | Advance to knockout stage |
| 2 | Austria | 3 | 2 | 0 | 1 | 4 | 3 | +1 | 6 | Advance to knockout stage |
| 3 | Ukraine | 3 | 1 | 0 | 2 | 4 | 5 | −1 | 3 | Advance to knockout stage |
| 4 | North Macedonia | 3 | 0 | 0 | 3 | 2 | 8 | −6 | 0 | |

Source: UEFA
Rules for classification: Group stage tiebreakers
(H) Hosts

| 13 June 2021 | Netherlands | 3–2 | Ukraine | Amsterdam, Netherlands |
| 21:00 | Wijnaldum 52'; Weghorst 58'; Dumfries 85' | Report | Yarmolenko 75'; Yaremchuk 79' | Stadium: Johan Cruyff Arena; Attendance: 15,837; Referee: Felix Brych (Germany) |

| 17 June 2021 | Ukraine | 2–1 | North Macedonia | Bucharest, Romania |
| 15:00 (16:00 UTC+3) | Yarmolenko 29'; Yaremchuk 34' | Report | Alioski 57' | Stadium: Arena Națională; Attendance: 10,001; Referee: Fernando Rapallini (Argentina) |

| 21 June 2021 | Ukraine | 0–1 | Austria | Bucharest, Romania |
| 18:00 (19:00 UTC+3) | | Report | Baumgartner 21' | Stadium: Arena Națională; Attendance: 10,472; Referee: Cüneyt Çakır (Turkey) |

Ranking of third-placed teams

| Pos | Grp | Team | Pld | W | D | L | GF | GA | GD | Pts | Qualification |
|---|---|---|---|---|---|---|---|---|---|---|---|
| 1 | F | Portugal | 3 | 1 | 1 | 1 | 7 | 6 | +1 | 4 | Advance to knockout stage |
| 2 | D | Czech Republic | 3 | 1 | 1 | 1 | 3 | 2 | +1 | 4 | Advance to knockout stage |
| 3 | A | Switzerland | 3 | 1 | 1 | 1 | 4 | 5 | −1 | 4 | Advance to knockout stage |
| 4 | C | Ukraine | 3 | 1 | 0 | 2 | 4 | 5 | −1 | 3 | Advance to knockout stage |
| 5 | B | Finland | 3 | 1 | 0 | 2 | 1 | 3 | −2 | 3 | |
| 6 | E | Slovakia | 3 | 1 | 0 | 2 | 2 | 7 | −5 | 3 | |

Source: UEFA
Rules for classification: 1) Points; 2) Goal difference; 3) Goals scored; 4) Wins; 5) Lower disciplinary points total; 6) European Qualifiers overall ranking.

==== Knockout phase ====
Round of 16

| 29 June 2021 | Sweden | 1–2 (a.e.t.) | Ukraine | Glasgow, Scotland |
| 20:00 | Forsberg 43' | Report | Zinchenko 27'; Dovbyk 120+1' | Stadium: Hampden Park; Attendance: 9,221; Referee: Daniele Orsato (Italy) |

Quarter-finals

| 3 July 2021 | Ukraine | 0–4 | England | Rome, Italy |
| 21:00 | | Report | Kane 4', 50'; Maguire 46'; J. Henderson 63' | Stadium: Stadio Olimpico; Attendance: 11,880; Referee: Felix Brych (Germany) |

=== Ukraine U-21 national football team ===
==== UEFA European Under-21 Championship ====
===== Group 8 =====
| Pos | Team | Pld | W | D | L | GF | GA | GD | Pts | Qualification | Denmark | Romania | Ukraine | Finland | | Malta |
|---|---|---|---|---|---|---|---|---|---|---|---|---|---|---|---|---|
| 1 | Denmark | 10 | 8 | 2 | 0 | 21 | 9 | +12 | 26 | Final tournament | — | 2–1 | 1–1 | 2–1 | 2–1 | 5–1 |
| 2 | Romania | 10 | 6 | 2 | 2 | 22 | 7 | +15 | 20 | Final tournament | 1–1 | — | 3–0 | 4–1 | 3–0 | 4–1 |
| 3 | Ukraine | 10 | 5 | 1 | 4 | 17 | 11 | +6 | 16 | | 2–3 | 1–0 | — | 0–2 | 3–0 | 4–0 |
| 4 | Finland | 10 | 4 | 1 | 5 | 14 | 15 | −1 | 13 | | 0–1 | 1–3 | 0–2 | — | 1–1 | 4–0 |
| 5 | Northern Ireland | 10 | 2 | 3 | 5 | 7 | 13 | −6 | 9 | | 0–1 | 0–0 | 1–0 | 2–3 | — | 0–0 |
| 6 | Malta | 10 | 0 | 1 | 9 | 4 | 30 | −26 | 1 | | 1–3 | 0–3 | 1–4 | 0–1 | 0–2 | — |

Source: UEFA

| 4 September 2020 | Denmark | 1–1 | Ukraine | Aalborg, Denmark |
| 18:00 | Jakobsen 90+5' | Report | Sikan 74' | Stadium: Aalborg Stadium; Attendance: 0 Referee: Jochem Kamphuis (Netherlands) |

| 8 September 2020 | Finland | 0–2 | Ukraine | Helsinki, Finland |
| 18:00 (19:00 EEST) | | Report | Konoplya 23'; Sikan 45+3' | Stadium: Helsinki Olympic Stadium; Attendance: 0 Referee: Thorvaldur Árnason (Iceland) |

| 9 October 2020 | Ukraine | 1–0 | Romania | Kyiv, Ukraine |
| 17:30 (18:30 EEST) | Buletsa 80' (pen.) | Report | | Stadium: Obolon Arena; Attendance: 400; Referee: Furkat Atazhanov (Kazakhstan) |

| 13 October 2020 | Northern Ireland | 1–0 | Ukraine | Ballymena, Northern Ireland |
| 19:00 (18:00 BST) | O'Neill 61' | Report | | Stadium: Ballymena Showgrounds, Attendance: 0 Referee: Barbeno Luca (San Marino) |

| 13 November 2020 (Note: All matches originally scheduled to be played in March 2020 were postponed due to the COVID-19 pandemic in Europe. These matches were subsequently rescheduled to be played in November 2020.) | Malta | 1–4 | Ukraine | Ta' Qali, Malta |
| 17:00 | Elouni 47' | Report | Kukharevych 4', 32'; Milovanov 79'; Shevtsov 90+2' | Stadium: Centenary Stadium; Referee: Pavel Rejzek (Czech Republic) |

| 17 November 2020 | Ukraine | 3–0 | Northern Ireland | Kovalivka, Ukraine |
| 17:30 (18:30 EET) | Babohlo 68'; Isayenko 70'; Kukharevych 74' | Report | | Stadium: Kolos Arena; Referee: Rauf Jabarov (Azerbaijan) |

=== Ukraine women's national football team ===
==== UEFA Women's Euro 2022 ====
===== Group I =====
| Pos | Team | Pld | W | D | L | GF | GA | GD | Pts | Qualification | Germany | Ukraine | Ireland | Greece | Montenegro |
|---|---|---|---|---|---|---|---|---|---|---|---|---|---|---|---|
| 1 | Germany | 8 | 8 | 0 | 0 | 46 | 1 | +45 | 24 | Final tournament | — | 8–0 | 3–0 | 6–0 | 10–0 |
| 2 | Ukraine | 8 | 5 | 0 | 3 | 16 | 21 | −5 | 15 | Play-offs | 0–8 | — | 1–0 | 4–0 | 2–1 |
| 3 | Republic of Ireland | 8 | 4 | 1 | 3 | 11 | 10 | +1 | 13 | | 1–3 | 3–2 | — | 1–0 | 2–0 |
| 4 | Greece | 8 | 2 | 1 | 5 | 6 | 21 | −15 | 7 | | 0–5 | 0–4 | 1–1 | — | 1–0 |
| 5 | Montenegro | 8 | 0 | 0 | 8 | 2 | 28 | −26 | 0 | | 0–3 | 1–3 | 0–3 | 0–4 | — |

Source: UEFA

| 18 September 2020 (Note: All matches originally scheduled to be played in April and June 2020 were postponed due to the COVID-19 pandemic in Europe. These matches were subsequently rescheduled to be played between September and October 2020.) Euro 2021 qualifying | Montenegro | 1–3 | Ukraine | Podgorica |
| 20:00 | Dešić 63' | Report | Apanaschenko 23'; Kunina 60'; Bulatović 66' (o.g.) | Stadium: DG Arena; Referee: Viola Raudziņa (Latvia) |

| 22 September 2020 Euro 2021 qualifying | Ukraine | 4–0 | Greece | Kyiv |
| 18:00 (19:00 EEST) | Kozlova 59', 71'; Kravets 88'; Apanaschenko 90+5' | Report | | Stadium: Obolon Arena; Referee: Aleksandra Česen (Slovenia) |

| 23 October 2020 Euro 2021 qualifying | Ukraine | 1–0 | Republic of Ireland | Kyiv |
| 18:00 (19:00 EEST) | O'Gorman 25' (o.g.) | Report | | Stadium: Obolon Arena; Referee: Ivana Martinčić (Croatia) |

| 27 October 2020 Euro 2021 qualifying | Greece | 0–4 | Ukraine | Athens |
| 16:30 (17:30 EET) | | Report | Pantsulaia 5'; Kravets 29', 55'; Kunina 83' | Stadium: Leoforos Alexandras Stadium; Referee: Shona Shukrula (Netherlands) |

| 1 December 2020 (Note: Matches originally scheduled to be played on 22 September 2020 were rearranged following postponements to other matches due to the COVID-19 pandemic in Europe.) Euro 2021 qualifying | Ukraine | 2–1 | Montenegro | Kyiv |
| 18:00 (19:00 EET) | Basanska 5' (pen.); Kunina 74' | Report | Đoković 6' | Stadium: Obolon Arena; Referee: Frida Nielsen (Denmark) |

===== Play-offs =====
====== Matches ======
| Team 1 | Agg. | Team 2 | 1st leg | 2nd leg |
|---|---|---|---|---|
| Ukraine | 1–4 | Northern Ireland | 1–2 | 0–2 |

| 9 April 2021 Euro 2022 qualifying | Ukraine | 1–2 | Northern Ireland | Kovalivka, Kyiv Oblast, Ukraine |
| 18:00 (19:00 EEST) | Apanashchenko 22' | Report | Furness 5'; Magill 57' | Stadium: Kolos Stadium; Referee: Riem Hussein (Germany) |

| 13 April 2021 Euro 2022 qualifying | Northern Ireland | 2–0 (4–1 agg.) | Ukraine | Belfast, Northern Ireland |
| 20:45 (19:45 BST) | Callaghan 55'; Caldwell 90+6' | Report | | Stadium: Seaview; Referee: Jana Adámková (Czech Republic) |

== UEFA competitions ==
=== UEFA Champions League ===
==== Qualifying phase and play-off round ====
===== Third qualifying round =====
| Team 1 | Score | Team 2 |
|---|---|---|
| Dynamo Kyiv (Ukraine) | 2–0 | (Netherlands) AZ |

===== Play-off round =====
| Team 1 | Agg. | Team 2 | 1st leg | 2nd leg |
|---|---|---|---|---|
| Gent (Belgium) | 1–5 | (Ukraine) Dynamo Kyiv | 1–2 | 0–3 |

==== Group stage ====
===== Group B =====
| Pos | Team | Pld | W | D | L | GF | GA | GD | Pts | Qualification | RMA | BMG | SHK | INT |
|---|---|---|---|---|---|---|---|---|---|---|---|---|---|---|
| 1 | (Spain) Real Madrid | 6 | 3 | 1 | 2 | 11 | 9 | +2 | 10 | Advance to knockout phase | — | 2–0 | 2–3 | 3–2 |
| 2 | (Germany) Borussia Mönchengladbach | 6 | 2 | 2 | 2 | 16 | 9 | +7 | 8 (Note: Head-to-head points: Borussia Mönchengladbach 6, Shakhtar Donetsk 0.) | Advance to knockout phase | 2–2 | — | 4–0 | 2–3 |
| 3 | (Ukraine) Shakhtar Donetsk | 6 | 2 | 2 | 2 | 5 | 12 | −7 | 8 | Transfer to Europa League | 2–0 | 0–6 | — | 0–0 |
| 4 | (Italy) Inter Milan | 6 | 1 | 3 | 2 | 7 | 9 | −2 | 6 | | 0–2 | 2–2 | 0–0 | — |

Source: UEFA

===== Group G =====
| Pos | Team | Pld | W | D | L | GF | GA | GD | Pts | Qualification | JUV | BAR | DKV | FER |
|---|---|---|---|---|---|---|---|---|---|---|---|---|---|---|
| 1 | (Italy) Juventus | 6 | 5 | 0 | 1 | 14 | 4 | +10 | 15 (Note: Tied on head-to-head points (3). Head-to-head goal difference: Juventus +1, Barcelona –1.) | Advance to knockout phase | — | 0–2 | 3–0 | 2–1 |
| 2 | (Spain) Barcelona | 6 | 5 | 0 | 1 | 16 | 5 | +11 | 15 | Advance to knockout phase | 0–3 | — | 2–1 | 5–1 |
| 3 | (Ukraine) Dynamo Kyiv | 6 | 1 | 1 | 4 | 4 | 13 | −9 | 4 | Transfer to Europa League | 0–2 | 0–4 | — | 1–0 |
| 4 | (Hungary) Ferencváros | 6 | 0 | 1 | 5 | 5 | 17 | −12 | 1 | | 1–4 | 0–3 | 2–2 | — |

Source: UEFA

=== UEFA Europa League ===
==== Qualifying rounds ====
===== Second qualifying round =====
| Team 1 | Score | Team 2 |
|---|---|---|
| Aris (Greece) | 1–2 | (Ukraine) Kolos Kovalivka |

===== Third qualifying round =====
| Team 1 | Score | Team 2 |
|---|---|---|
| VfL Wolfsburg (Germany) | 2–0 | (Ukraine) Desna Chernihiv |
| Rijeka (Croatia) | 2–0 (a.e.t.) | (Ukraine) Kolos Kovalivka |

==== Group stage ====
===== Group G =====
| Pos | Team | Pld | W | D | L | GF | GA | GD | Pts | Qualification | LEI | BRA | ZOR | AEK |
|---|---|---|---|---|---|---|---|---|---|---|---|---|---|---|
| 1 | (England) Leicester City | 6 | 4 | 1 | 1 | 14 | 5 | +9 | 13 (Note: Head-to-head points: Leicester City 4, Braga 1.) | Advance to knockout phase | — | 4–0 | 3–0 | 2–0 |
| 2 | (Portugal) Braga | 6 | 4 | 1 | 1 | 14 | 10 | +4 | 13 | Advance to knockout phase | 3–3 | — | 2–0 | 3–0 |
| 3 | (Ukraine) Zorya Luhansk | 6 | 2 | 0 | 4 | 6 | 11 | −5 | 6 | | 1–0 | 1–2 | — | 1–4 |
| 4 | (Greece) AEK Athens | 6 | 1 | 0 | 5 | 7 | 15 | −8 | 3 | | 1–2 | 2–4 | 0–3 | — |

Source: UEFA

==== Knockout phase ====
===== Round of 32 =====
| Team 1 | Agg. | Team 2 | 1st leg | 2nd leg |
|---|---|---|---|---|
| Dynamo Kyiv (Ukraine) | 2–1 | (Belgium) Club Brugge | 1–1 | 1–0 |
| Maccabi Tel Aviv (Israel) | 0–3 | (Ukraine) Shakhtar Donetsk | 0–2 | 0–1 |

===== Round of 16 =====
| Team 1 | Agg. | Team 2 | 1st leg | 2nd leg |
|---|---|---|---|---|
| Dynamo Kyiv (Ukraine) | 0–4 | (Spain) Villarreal | 0–2 | 0–2 |
| Roma (Italy) | 5–1 | (Ukraine) Shakhtar Donetsk | 3–0 | 2–1 |

=== UEFA Women's Champions League ===
==== Qualifying round ====
===== First qualifying round =====
| Team 1 | Score | Team 2 |
|---|---|---|
| Zhytlobud-2 Kharkiv (Ukraine) | 9–0 | (Armenia) Alashkert |

===== Second qualifying round =====
| Team 1 | Score | Team 2 |
|---|---|---|
| SFK 2000 (Bosnia and Herzegovina) | 0–2 | (Ukraine) Zhytlobud-2 Kharkiv |

==== Knockout phase ====
===== Round of 32 =====
| Team 1 | Agg. | Team 2 | 1st leg | 2nd leg |
|---|---|---|---|---|
| Zhytlobud-2 Kharkiv (Ukraine) | 2–2 (a) | (Kazakhstan) BIIK Kazygurt | 2–1 | 0–1 |

== Men's club football ==
| League | | Promoted to league | Relegated from league |
|---|---|---|---|
| Premier League | | Mynai; Rukh Lviv; Inhulets Petrove | Karpaty Lviv (excluded, admitted to the Second League) |
| PFL League 1 | | Nyva Ternopil; VPK-Ahro Shevchenkivka; Polissya Zhytomyr; Krystal Kherson; Veres Rivne; Alians Lypova Dolyna | Balkany Zorya; Metalurh Zaporizhia; Cherkashchyna Cherkasy |
| PFL League 2 | Groups | | |
| PFL League 2 | A | Chernihiv; Epitsentr Dunaivtsi; Karpaty Halych; Rubikon Kyiv; Volyn-2 Lutsk | ~~FC Kalush~~ |
| PFL League 2 | B | Dnipro Cherkasy; Peremoha Dnipro; Yarud Mariupol; Metal Kharkiv | ~~Avanhard-2 Kramatorsk~~; ~~Chornomorets-2 Odesa~~ |

Note: For all scratched clubs, see section Clubs removed for more details

=== Premier League ===
| Pos | Team | Pld | W | D | L | GF | GA | GD | Pts | Qualification or relegation |
|---|---|---|---|---|---|---|---|---|---|---|
| 1 | Dynamo Kyiv (C) | 26 | 20 | 5 | 1 | 59 | 15 | +44 | 65 | Qualification for the Champions League group stage |
| 2 | Shakhtar Donetsk | 26 | 16 | 6 | 4 | 54 | 19 | +35 | 54 | Qualification for the Champions League third qualifying round |
| 3 | Zorya Luhansk | 26 | 15 | 5 | 6 | 44 | 22 | +22 | 50 | Qualification for the Europa League play-off round |
| 4 | Kolos Kovalivka | 26 | 10 | 11 | 5 | 36 | 26 | +10 | 41 | Qualification for the Europa Conference League third qualifying round |
| 5 | Vorskla Poltava | 26 | 11 | 8 | 7 | 37 | 30 | +7 | 41 | Qualification for the Europa Conference League second qualifying round |
| 6 | Desna Chernihiv | 26 | 10 | 8 | 8 | 38 | 32 | +6 | 38 | |
| 7 | SC Dnipro-1 | 26 | 8 | 6 | 12 | 36 | 38 | −2 | 30 | |
| 8 | FC Lviv | 26 | 8 | 5 | 13 | 25 | 51 | −26 | 29 (Note: Head-to-head goal difference: Lviv +1, Oleksandriya -1) | |
| 9 | FC Oleksandriya | 26 | 8 | 5 | 13 | 33 | 37 | −4 | 29 | |
| 10 | Rukh Lviv | 26 | 6 | 10 | 10 | 27 | 39 | −12 | 28 | |
| 11 | FC Mariupol | 26 | 6 | 8 | 12 | 27 | 41 | −14 | 26 (Note: Head-to-head points: Mariupol 4, Inhulets 1) | |
| 12 | Inhulets Petrove | 26 | 5 | 11 | 10 | 24 | 39 | −15 | 26 | |
| 13 | Olimpik Donetsk (R) | 26 | 6 | 4 | 16 | 28 | 48 | −20 | 22 | Relegation to Ukrainian First League |
| 14 | FC Mynai | 26 | 4 | 6 | 16 | 16 | 47 | −31 | 18 | Readmitted |

Source: Ukrainian Premier League
Rules for classification: 1) Points; 2) Head-to-head points; 3) Head-to-head goal difference; 4) Head-to-head higher number of goals scored; 5) Goal difference; 6) Higher number of goals scored; 7) Draw or "Golden match" if two teams tied for title (Article 22, paragraph 3).
(C) Champions; (R) Relegated

=== PFL League 1 (First League) ===
| Pos | Team | Pld | W | D | L | GF | GA | GD | Pts | Promotion, qualification or relegation |
|---|---|---|---|---|---|---|---|---|---|---|
| 1 | Veres Rivne (P, C) | 30 | 21 | 5 | 4 | 56 | 21 | +35 | 68 | Promotion to Ukrainian Premier League |
| 2 | Chornomorets Odesa (P) | 30 | 18 | 7 | 5 | 45 | 23 | +22 | 61 | Promotion to Ukrainian Premier League |
| 3 | Metalist 1925 Kharkiv (P) | 30 | 16 | 8 | 6 | 36 | 22 | +14 | 56 | Promotion to Ukrainian Premier League |
| 4 | Mykolaiv (R) | 30 | 15 | 8 | 7 | 49 | 23 | +26 | 53 | Relegation to Ukrainian Second League |
| 5 | Ahrobiznes Volochysk | 30 | 15 | 7 | 8 | 46 | 27 | +19 | 52 | |
| 6 | Alians Lypova Dolyna | 30 | 14 | 9 | 7 | 46 | 31 | +15 | 51 | |
| 7 | Volyn Lutsk | 30 | 13 | 7 | 10 | 39 | 28 | +11 | 46 | |
| 8 | Obolon Kyiv | 30 | 13 | 4 | 13 | 44 | 35 | +9 | 43 | |
| 9 | Hirnyk-Sport Horishni Plavni | 30 | 11 | 5 | 14 | 43 | 45 | −2 | 38 | |
| 10 | VPK-Ahro Shevchenkivka | 30 | 11 | 4 | 15 | 30 | 48 | −18 | 37 | |
| 11 | Polissia Zhytomyr | 30 | 9 | 8 | 13 | 32 | 37 | −5 | 35 | |
| 12 | Avanhard Kramatorsk | 30 | 9 | 5 | 16 | 32 | 51 | −19 | 32 | |
| 13 | Nyva Ternopil | 30 | 8 | 7 | 15 | 30 | 50 | −20 | 31 | |
| 14 | Prykarpattia Ivano-Frankivsk | 30 | 8 | 6 | 16 | 25 | 45 | −20 | 30 | |
| 15 | Kremin Kremenchuk | 30 | 6 | 6 | 18 | 23 | 50 | −27 | 24 | |
| 16 | Krystal Kherson (R) | 30 | 3 | 4 | 23 | 21 | 61 | −40 | 13 | Relegation to Ukrainian Second League |

Updated to match(es) played on 12 June 2021. Source: PFL.ua
Rules for classification: 1) Points; 2) Head-to-head points; 3) Head-to-head goal difference; 4) Head-to-head goals scored; 5) Goal difference in all games; 6) Goals scored in all games (Note: calculation by criteria indicated in rules 2, 3, 4 is conducted with consideration of all teams that have an equal number of tournament points at the moment of calculation and not only among those which after preliminary criteria have appeared more successful).
(C) Champions; (P) Promoted; (R) Relegated

=== PFL League 2 (Second League) ===
==== Group A ====
| Pos | Team | Pld | W | D | L | GF | GA | GD | Pts | Promotion, qualification or relegation |
|---|---|---|---|---|---|---|---|---|---|---|
| 1 | Podillya Khmelnytskyi (P, C) | 24 | 17 | 6 | 1 | 46 | 13 | +33 | 57 | Promotion to Ukrainian First League |
| 2 | FC Uzhhorod (P) | 24 | 17 | 4 | 3 | 50 | 23 | +27 | 55 | Promotion to Ukrainian First League |
| 3 | Dinaz Vyshhorod | 24 | 15 | 6 | 3 | 52 | 19 | +33 | 51 | |
| 4 | Epitsentr Dunaivtsi | 24 | 14 | 6 | 4 | 36 | 15 | +21 | 48 | |
| 5 | Karpaty Halych | 24 | 14 | 4 | 6 | 42 | 25 | +17 | 46 | |
| 6 | Nyva Vinnytsia | 24 | 10 | 3 | 11 | 38 | 38 | 0 | 33 | |
| 7 | Bukovyna Chernivtsi | 24 | 9 | 5 | 10 | 27 | 31 | −4 | 32 | |
| 8 | Chaika Petropavlivska Borshchahivka | 24 | 6 | 7 | 11 | 26 | 32 | −6 | 25 | |
| 9 | Obolon-2 Bucha | 24 | 6 | 6 | 12 | 21 | 39 | −18 | 24 | Withdrew after season |
| 10 | FC Chernihiv | 24 | 5 | 6 | 13 | 19 | 33 | −14 | 21 | |
| 11 | Rubikon Kyiv | 24 | 4 | 5 | 15 | 17 | 44 | −27 | 17 | |
| 12 | Volyn-2 Lutsk | 24 | 3 | 4 | 17 | 16 | 43 | −27 | 13 (Note: Head-to-head points: Volyn-2 4, Karpaty 1) | Withdrew after season |
| 13 | Karpaty Lviv | 24 | 3 | 4 | 17 | 20 | 55 | −35 | 13 | Withdrew after season |
| - | FC Kalush | 0 | - | - | - | - | - | — | 0 | Withdrew after Round 1 before their first game |

Updated to match(es) played on 11 June 2021. Source: PFL.ua
Rules for classification: 1) Points; 2) Head-to-head points; 3) Head-to-head goal difference; 4) Head-to-head goals scored; 5) Goal difference in all games; 6) Goals scored in all games (Note: calculation by criteria indicated in rules 2, 3, 4 is conducted with consideration of all teams that have an equal number of tournament points at the moment of calculation and not only among those which after preliminary criteria have appeared more successful).
(C) Champions; (P) Promoted

==== Group B ====
| Pos | Team | Pld | W | D | L | GF | GA | GD | Pts | Promotion, qualification or relegation |
|---|---|---|---|---|---|---|---|---|---|---|
| 1 | Metal Kharkiv (C, P) | 22 | 20 | 2 | 0 | 65 | 5 | +60 | 62 | Promotion to Ukrainian First League |
| 2 | Kryvbas Kryvyi Rih (P) | 22 | 15 | 5 | 2 | 53 | 15 | +38 | 50 | Promotion to Ukrainian First League |
| 3 | Metalurh Zaporizhya | 22 | 13 | 4 | 5 | 42 | 20 | +22 | 43 | |
| 4 | Tavriya Simferopol | 22 | 12 | 6 | 4 | 41 | 22 | +19 | 42 | |
| 5 | Enerhiya Nova Kakhovka | 22 | 9 | 3 | 10 | 34 | 35 | −1 | 30 | |
| 6 | Yarud Mariupol | 22 | 8 | 4 | 10 | 27 | 39 | −12 | 28 | |
| 7 | Dnipro Cherkasy | 22 | 7 | 6 | 9 | 17 | 34 | −17 | 27 | |
| 8 | Balkany Zoria | 22 | 6 | 5 | 11 | 20 | 28 | −8 | 23 (Note: Head-to-head points: Balkany 4, Peremoha 1) | |
| 9 | Peremoha Dnipro | 22 | 5 | 8 | 9 | 21 | 29 | −8 | 23 | |
| 10 | Real Pharma Odesa | 22 | 5 | 3 | 14 | 13 | 40 | −27 | 18 | |
| 11 | FC Nikopol | 22 | 3 | 5 | 14 | 18 | 46 | −28 | 14 | |
| 12 | MFC Mykolaiv-2 | 22 | 1 | 5 | 16 | 13 | 51 | −38 | 8 | Withdrew after season |
| - | Cherkashchyna Cherkasy | 0 | 0 | 0 | 0 | 0 | 0 | 0 | 0 | Withdrawn and record annulled |

Updated to match(es) played on 11 June 2021. Source: PFL.ua
Rules for classification: 1) Points; 2) Head-to-head points; 3) Head-to-head goal difference; 4) Head-to-head goals scored; 5) Goal difference in all games; 6) Goals scored in all games (Note: calculation by criteria indicated in rules 2, 3, 4 is conducted with consideration of all teams that have an equal number of tournament points at the moment of calculation and not only among those which after preliminary criteria have appeared more successful).
(C) Champions; (P) Promoted

=== Cup competitions ===
==== Super Cup ====
25 August 2020
21:00 EEST

| Shakhtar Donetsk | 1–3 | Dynamo Kyiv |
|---|---|---|
| Moraes 37' | Report | De Pena 20'; Rodrigues 31'; Sol 83' |

Olimpiyskiy National Sports Complex, Kyiv
Attendance: 0 (Note: The match was played behind closed doors due to the COVID-19 pandemic in Ukraine.)
Referee: Vitaliy Romanov (Dnipro)

== Women's club football ==
| League | Promoted to league | Relegated from league |
|---|---|---|
| Vyshcha Liha | Karpaty Lviv; Nika Mykolaiv; Bukovynska Nadiya Velykyi Kuchuriv | ~~Iednist Plysky~~; ~~Iatran Berestivets~~; Rodyna Kostopil |

Note: For the scratched club, see section Clubs removed for more details

=== Vyshcha Liha ===
| Pos | Team | Pld | W | D | L | GF | GA | GD | Pts | Qualification or relegation |
|---|---|---|---|---|---|---|---|---|---|---|
| 1 | Zhytlobud-2 Kharkiv | 9 | 8 | 1 | 0 | 54 | 3 | +51 | 25 | Qualification to Championship round |
| 2 | Zhytlobud-1 Kharkiv | 9 | 8 | 1 | 0 | 46 | 4 | +42 | 25 | Qualification to Championship round |
| 3 | Voskhod Stara Maiachka | 9 | 7 | 0 | 2 | 22 | 9 | +13 | 21 | Qualification to Championship round |
| 4 | Mariupilchanka | 9 | 5 | 0 | 4 | 22 | 27 | −5 | 15 (Note: Head-to-head points: Mariupol 3, Karpaty 0) | Qualification to Championship round |
| 5 | Karpaty Lviv | 9 | 5 | 0 | 4 | 15 | 27 | −12 | 15 | Qualification to Championship round |
| 6 | Ladomyr Volodymyr-Volynskyi | 9 | 3 | 1 | 5 | 15 | 22 | −7 | 10 | Qualification to Championship round |
| 7 | Pantery Uman | 9 | 3 | 0 | 6 | 10 | 27 | −17 | 9 | Qualification to Relegation round |
| 8 | Nika Mykolaiv | 9 | 2 | 0 | 7 | 14 | 32 | −18 | 6 | Qualification to Relegation round |
| 9 | EMS Podillia Vinnytsia | 9 | 1 | 1 | 7 | 5 | 26 | −21 | 4 | Qualification to Relegation round |
| 10 | Bukovynska Nadia | 9 | 1 | 0 | 8 | 7 | 33 | −26 | 3 | Qualification to Relegation round |

Source: womensfootball.com.ua
Rules for classification: 1) Points; 2) Head-to-head points; 3) Head-to-head goal difference; 4) Head-to-head goals scored; 5) Goal difference; 6) Goals scored.
Notes:

| Pos | Team | Pld | W | D | L | GF | GA | GD | Pts | |
|---|---|---|---|---|---|---|---|---|---|---|
| 1 | Zhytlobud-1 Kharkiv (Note: Participant of the 2020–21 Ukrainian Women's Cup final.) (C) | 19 | 18 | 1 | 0 | 99 | 7 | +92 | 55 | Qualification for the Champions League first round |
| 2 | Zhytlobud-2 Kharkiv | 19 | 16 | 1 | 2 | 97 | 11 | +86 | 49 | |
| 3 | Voskhod Stara Maiachka | 19 | 11 | 1 | 7 | 32 | 29 | +3 | 34 | |
| 4 | Ladomyr Volodymyr-Volynskyi | 19 | 8 | 1 | 10 | 34 | 54 | −20 | 25 | |
| 5 | Mariupol | 19 | 6 | 1 | 12 | 27 | 59 | −32 | 19 | |
| 6 | Karpaty Lviv | 19 | 5 | 2 | 12 | 22 | 69 | −47 | 17 | |

Source: womensfootball.com.ua
Rules for classification: 1) Points; 2) Head-to-head points; 3) Head-to-head goal difference; 4) Head-to-head goals scored; 5) Goal difference; 6) Goals scored.
(C) Champions
Notes:

| Pos | Team | Pld | W | D | L | GF | GA | GD | Pts | |
|---|---|---|---|---|---|---|---|---|---|---|
| 7 | Nika Mykolaiv | 15 | 7 | 1 | 7 | 57 | 35 | +22 | 22 | Relegation to Persha Liha |
| 8 | Pantery Uman | 15 | 6 | 0 | 9 | 35 | 39 | −4 | 18 | |
| 9 | EMS Podillia Vinnytsia | 15 | 4 | 2 | 9 | 23 | 31 | −8 | 14 | |
| 10 | Bukovynska Nadia | 15 | 1 | 0 | 14 | 11 | 103 | −92 | 3 | |

Source: womensfootball.com.ua
Rules for classification: 1) Points; 2) Head-to-head points; 3) Head-to-head goal difference; 4) Head-to-head goals scored; 5) Goal difference; 6) Goals scored.

== Managerial changes ==
This is a list of managerial changes among Ukrainian professional football clubs (top two leagues):

| Team | Outgoing manager | Manner of departure | Date of vacancy | Table | Incoming manager | Date of appointment | Table |
|---|---|---|---|---|---|---|---|
| Polissya Zhytomyr | (Ukraine) Anatoliy Bezsmertnyi | Resigned | 4 July 2020 | Pre-season | (Ukraine) Serhiy Shyshchenko | 7 July 2020 | Pre-season |
| Dynamo Kyiv | (Ukraine) Oleksiy Mykhaylychenko | Mutual agreement | 20 July 2020 | Pre-season | (Romania) Mircea Lucescu | 23 July 2020 | Pre-season |
| Olimpik Donetsk | (Ukraine) Ihor Klymovskyi (interim) | Made permanent | 20 July 2020 | Pre-season | (Ukraine) Ihor Klymovskyi | 20 July 2020 | Pre-season |
| FC Mariupol | (Ukraine) Oleksandr Babych | End of contract | 30 July 2020 | Pre-season | (Ukraine) Ostap Markevych | 3 August 2020 | Pre-season |
| Kremin Kremenchuk | (Ukraine) Serhiy Svystun | Undisclosed | 14 August 2020 | Pre-season | (Ukraine) Oleksandr Holovko | 14 August 2020 | Pre-season |
| Volyn Lutsk | (Ukraine) Andriy Tlumak | End of contract | 14 August 2020 | Pre-season | (Ukraine) Vasyl Sachko | 19 August 2020 | Pre-season |
| Avanhard Kramatorsk | (Ukraine) Oleksiy Horodov (interim) | Made permanent | 17 August 2020 | Pre-season | (Ukraine) Oleksiy Horodov | 17 August 2020 | Pre-season |
| Obolon-Brovar Kyiv | (Ukraine) Valeriy Ivashchenko (interim) | Made permanent | 18 August 2020 | Pre-season | (Ukraine) Valeriy Ivashchenko | 18 August 2020 | Pre-season |
| Metalist 1925 Kharkiv | (Ukraine) Vyacheslav Khruslov (interim) | End of interim | 21 August 2020 | Pre-season | (Ukraine) Valeriy Kriventsov | 21 August 2020 | Pre-season |
| Prykarpattia Ivano-Frankivsk | (Ukraine) Volodymyr Kovalyuk | Mutual consent | 2 September 2020 | Pre-season | (Ukraine) Ruslan Mostovyi | 4 September 2020 | Pre-season |
| SC Dnipro-1 | (Ukraine) Dmytro Mykhaylenko | Resigned | 18 September 2020 | 11th | (Croatia) Igor Jovićević | 22 September 2020 | 11th |
| Krystal Kherson | (Ukraine) Eduard Khavrov | Resigned | 28 September 2020 | 16th | (Ukraine) Serhiy Valyayev | 1 October 2020 | 16th |
| Nyva Ternopil | (Ukraine) Vasyl Malyk | Resigned | 10 October 2020 | 11th | (Ukraine) Ihor Bilan (interim) | 10 October 2020 | 11th |
| Obolon Kyiv | (Ukraine) Valeriy Ivashchenko | Changed to assistant | 17 October 2020 | 15th | (Ukraine) Pavlo Yakovenko | 18 October 2020 | 15th |
| FC Lviv | (Georgia (country)) Giorgi Tsetsadze | Resigned | 24 October 2020 | 14th | (Ukraine) Vitaliy Shumskyi (interim) | 28 October 2020 | 14th |
| Krystal Kherson | (Ukraine) Serhiy Valyayev | Resigned | 20 November 2020 | 16th | (Ukraine) Serhiy Shevtsov (interim) | 21 November 2020 | 16th |
| Kremin Kremenchuk | (Ukraine) Oleksandr Holovko | Mutual consent | 11 December 2020 | 12th | (Ukraine) Oleksiy Hodin | 6 January 2021 | 12th |
| Krystal Kherson | (Ukraine) Serhiy Shevtsov (interim) | Resigned | 8 January 2021 | 16th | (Ukraine) Vadym Yevtushenko | 23 February 2021 | 16th |
| Chornomorets Odesa | (Ukraine) Serhiy Kovalets | Mutual consent | 17 February 2021 | 3rd | (Ukraine) Oleksiy Antonov | 18 February 2021 | 3rd |
| Olimpik Donetsk | (Ukraine) Ihor Klymovskyi | Mutual consent | 25 February 2021 | 8th | (Ukraine) Yuriy Kalitvintsev | 25 February 2021 | 8th |
| FC Lviv | (Ukraine) Vitaliy Shumskyi (interim) | Mutual consent | 1 March 2021 | 14th | (Ukraine) Anatoliy Bezsmertnyi | 2 March 2021 | 14th |

== Clubs removed ==
- Second cub teams Avanhard-2 Kramatorsk and Chornomorets-2 Odesa did not apply for participation in the Second League this season.
- FC Kalush withdrew soon after the start of the season without playing a single game
