= 2020–21 Ukrainian First League =

Ukrainian First League
- Season: 2020–21
- Dates: 5 September 2020 – 11 June 2021 winter break 1 December 2020 – 18 March 2021
- Champions: Veres Rivne
- Promoted: Veres Rivne, Chornomorets Odesa, Metalist 1925 Kharkiv
- Relegated: MFC Mykolaiv, Krystal Kherson
- Matches: 115
- Goals: 299 (2.6 per match)
- Top goalscorer: 15 – Ruslan Chernenko (Ahrobiznes)
- Biggest home win: 6 – Mykolaiv 6–0 Krystal (Round 16)
- Biggest away win: 4 – VPK-Ahro 0–4 Mykolaiv (Round 12); Krystal 0–4 Chornomorets (Round 12)
- Highest scoring: 7 – Mykolaiv 6–1 Hirnyk-Sport (Round 6)
- Longest winning run: 7 – Ahrobiznes (Round 10–16)
- Longest unbeaten run: 8 – Chornomorets (Round 1–8)
- Longest winless run: 7 – Krystal (Round 1–8)
- Longest losing run: 7 – Krystal (Round 1–8)
- Highest attendance: 13,134 – Metalist 1925 0–1 Chornomorets (Round 28)
- Lowest attendance: 0 – 94 games
- Total attendance: 18644
- Average attendance: 888 (Note: includes only games with spectators)
- All statistics correct as of 1 December 2020.

The 2020–21 Ukrainian First League was the 30th since its establishment. The league competition consists of 16 teams according to the decision of the PFL Council of Leagues. The season commenced on 5 September 2020. The final composition and regulations of the Professional Football League of Ukraine both leagues were adopted at the PFL Conference on 21 August 2020.

== Summary ==
In this season, the bottom two teams of the First League are to be relegated to the Second League. The top two teams from each group of the Second League will gain promotion to the First League for the next season.

Promotion and/or relegation play-off games that were in place since 2011 (with exclusion in 2013) were discontinued altogether for the season.

This league's season was expected to have number of team increased to eighteen, however due to financial situation with both FC Karpaty Lviv and FC Balkany Zorya the PFL reinstated the sixteen team competition as per last season(see "Teams" section).

Due to the ongoing COVID-19 pandemic attendance restriction in the league is still in effect, but was partially eased. The postponed games that the PFL was not able to reschedule for the later dates of fall half of the season, on 30 November 2020 were rescheduled for the spring half of 2021.

== Teams ==
This season, Ukrainian First League consist of 16 teams, which includes top two teams from the both groups of 2019–20 Ukrainian Second League and two relegation/promotion play-offs winners.

=== Promoted teams ===
The following teams have been promoted from the 2019–20 Ukrainian Second League:

- Nyva Ternopil – first place in Group A (returning after 5 seasons, last competed in the 2015–16 season)
- Polissia Zhytomyr – second place in Group A (debut, however another club named as Polissia Zhytomyr last competed in the 2004–05 season)
- Veres Rivne – play-off winner (returning after 3 seasons)
- VPK-Ahro Shevchenkivka – first place in Group B (debut)
- Krystal Kherson – second place in Group B (returning after 28 seasons, last competed in the 1992 league's inaugural season)
- Alians Lypova Dolyna – play-off winner (debut)

=== Relegated teams ===
- None – Karpaty Lviv that placed 12th in the 2019–20 Ukrainian Premier League, were excluded from the league for repeated absence from scheduled games. A possibility was declared at first that the club might be admitted to the First League nonetheless, but later it was announced that Karpaty will be admitted the Second League instead. About a month later on 14 August 2020, Tribuna.ua informed that Karpaty never applied for certification for the next season in first or second leagues.

=== Legal and other issues ===
- FC Hirnyk-Sport Horishni Plavni was approved by the Ukrainian Association of Football (UAF) to play, after the UAF Chamber of Dispute Resolution order the club to pay compensation to its former player and the club completely ignored it.
- FC Balkany Zorya announced that it was considering withdrawing from the league as it is too expensive for the club.

=== Renamed teams ===
- FC Obolon-Brovar Kyiv changed its name to FC Obolon Kyiv before the start of the season.
- FC Veres Rivne changed its name to RNK Veres Rivne before the start of the season.
- MFC Kremin Kremenchuk changed its name to FC Kremin Kremenchuk before the start of the season.
- FC Avanhard Kramatorsk changed its name to Avanhard-SK Kramatorsk at the during the latter (May 30) part of the season.

=== Location map ===
The following displays the location of teams.

Home venues of teams in the 2020–21 Ukrainian First League.

== Stadiums ==
The following stadiums were used as home grounds for the teams in the competition. The minimum capacity for stadiums of the First League clubs is set at 1,500 spectators.

Rank	Stadium	Location	Capacity	Club	Notes
1	OSC Metalist	Kharkiv	40,003	Metalist 1925 Kharkiv	
2	Arena Lviv	Lviv	34,915	Ahrobiznes Volochysk	Round 18
3	Chornomorets Stadium	Odesa	34,164	Chornomorets Odesa	
4	Yuvileiny Stadium	Sumy	25,830	Alians Lypova Dolyna	Rounds 1, 3, 14, 5
5	Meteor Stadium	Dnipro	24,381	VPK-Ahro Shevchenkivka	
6	Ternopil City Stadium	Ternopil	15,150	Nyva Ternopil	
7	Avanhard Stadium	Lutsk	12,080	Volyn Lutsk	
7	Avanhard Stadium	Lutsk	12,080	Nyva Ternopil	Round 18
8	MCS Rukh	Ivano-Frankivsk	6,500	Prykarpattia Ivano-Frankivsk	Under passive reconstruction since 1986, only one stand out of four is active
9	Prapor Stadium	Kramatorsk	6,000	Avanhard Kramatorsk	
10	Central Stadium	Zhytomyr	5,928	Polissia Zhytomyr	Returned for round 18 (Note: After over 16 years)
11	Naftovyk Stadium	Okhtyrka	5,256	Alians Lypova Dolyna	Rounds 8, 10, 12
12	Obolon Arena	Kyiv	5,100	Obolon Kyiv	
13	Metalurh Stadium (Note: Metalurh Stadium is not among UAF approved stadiums on the list that was published in summer of 2020)	Bakhmut	4,000	Avanhard Kramatorsk	Round 12
14	Skif Stadium	Lviv	3,742	Veres Rivne	Rounds 11, 19
14	Skif Stadium	Lviv	3,742	Nyva Ternopil	Round 16
15	Krystal Stadium	Kherson	3,400	Krystal Kherson	
16	Enerhetyk Stadium	Burshtyn	3,000	Prykarpattia Ivano-Frankivsk	Round 11
17	Yunist Stadium	Volochysk	2,700	Ahrobiznes Volochysk	home stadium
17	Yunist Stadium	Volochysk	2,700	Nyva Ternopil	Round 15
18	Yunist Stadium	Horishni Plavni	2,500	Hirnyk-Sport Horishni Plavni	
19	Spartak-Arena	Zhytomyr	2,500	Polissia Zhytomyr	Round 8 (Note: Polissia Zhytomyr played their Round 8 home match at Spartak-Arena in their home city)
20	Bannikov Stadium	Kyiv	1,678	Polissia Zhytomyr	temporary home stadium (Note: Before the season's start it was announced in news media that Polissia Zhytomyr may start to play their home games in Zhytomyr at Tsentralnyi Stadion, but in reality plays most of their home matches at Bannikov Stadium in Kyiv)
21	Kremin Stadium	Kremenchuk	1,500	Kremin Kremenchuk	
22	Vyshnivets Stadium	Vyshnivets	1,500	Nyva Ternopil	Round 10
23	Yuvileynyi Stadium	Bucha	1,028	Polissia Zhytomyr	Round 6 (Note: Polissia Zhytomyr played their Round 6 home match at Yuvileynyi Stadium in Bucha, Kyiv Oblast)
24	Bohdan Markevych Stadium	Vynnyky	900	Ahrobiznes Volochysk	Round 10, 12 (Note: Bohdan Markevych Stadium in Vynnyky, Lviv Oblast was used as home game for Ahrobiznes Volochysk in Round 10 & 12)
25	Kolos Stadium	Mlyniv	850	Veres Rivne	temporary home stadium
26	Alians-Arena	Bairak	520	Alians Lypova Dolyna	Round 19, 21
27	Central Stadium (upper field)	Mykolaiv	500	MFC Mykolaiv	temporary home stadium (Note: MFC Mykolaiv have played all their home games thus far in the season at the Upper Field of the Central City Stadium)
28	Metalist Educational Training Base	Vysokyi	500	Metalist 1925 Kharkiv	Round 8, 10, 12

== Personnel and sponsorship ==
Team	President	Head coach	Kit manufacturer	Shirt sponsor
Ahrobiznes Volochysk	Oleh Sobutskyi	(Ukraine) Oleksandr Chyzhevskyi	Nike	Ahrobiznes
Alians Lypova Dolyna	Serhiy Demchenko	(Ukraine) Yuriy Yaroshenko	Puma	Alians
Avanhard Kramatorsk	Maksym Yefimov	(Ukraine) Oleksiy Horodov	Lotto Sport	Donbasenergo
Chornomorets Odesa	Leonid Klimov	(Ukraine) Oleksiy Antonov	Legea	Hefest
Hirnyk-Sport Horishni Plavni	Petro Kaplun	(Ukraine) Ihor Zhabchenko	Adidas	Ferrexpo
Kremin Kremenchuk	Serhiy Kovnir	(Ukraine) Serhiy Svystun (interim)	Select Sport	Alfateks
Krystal Kherson	Vadym Yevtushenko	(Ukraine) Vadym Yevtushenko	Joma	Ahro star
Metalist 1925 Kharkiv	Yaroslav Vdovenko	(Ukraine) Valeriy Kriventsov	Puma	AES Group
MFC Mykolaiv	Serhiy Kantor	(Ukraine) Illia Blyzniuk	Mayner	Ekvator Factory
Nyva Ternopil	Oleksandr Stadnyk	(Ukraine) Ihor Klymovskyi	K-Sector	Rodyna invest
Obolon Kyiv	Oleksandr Slobodian	(Ukraine) Valeriy Ivashchenko (interim)	Jako	Favorite Sport
Polissia Zhytomyr	Volodymyr Zahurskyi	(Ukraine) Serhiy Shyshchenko	Erreà	BGV Group
Prykarpattia Ivano-Frankivsk	Vasyl Olshanetskyi	(Ukraine) Oleh Rypan (interim)	Joma	Adamson
Veres Rivne	Ivan Nadieyin	(Ukraine) Yuriy Virt	Nike	Ukrteplo
Volyn Lutsk	Vitaliy Kvartsyanyi	(Ukraine) Vasyl Sachko	Joma	—
VPK-Ahro Shevchenkivka	Volodymyr Korsun	(Ukraine) Serhiy Solovyov	Nike	VPK-Ahro

=== Managerial changes ===
Team	Outgoing head coach	Manner of departure	Date of vacancy	Table	Incoming head coach	Date of appointment
Polissya Zhytomyr	(Ukraine) Anatoliy Bezsmertnyi	Resigned	4 July 2020	Pre-season	(Ukraine) Serhiy Shyshchenko	7 July 2020
Kremin Kremenchuk	(Ukraine) Serhiy Svystun	Undisclosed	14 August 2020	Pre-season	(Ukraine) Oleksandr Holovko	14 August 2020
Volyn Lutsk	(Ukraine) Andriy Tlumak	End of contract	14 August 2020	Pre-season	(Ukraine) Vasyl Sachko	19 August 2020
Avanhard Kramatorsk	(Ukraine) Oleksiy Horodov (interim)	Made permanent	17 August 2020	Pre-season	(Ukraine) Oleksiy Horodov	17 August 2020
Obolon Kyiv	(Ukraine) Valeriy Ivashchenko (interim)	Made permanent	18 August 2020	Pre-season	(Ukraine) Valeriy Ivashchenko	18 August 2020
Metalist 1925 Kharkiv	(Ukraine) Vyacheslav Khruslov (interim)	End of interim	21 August 2020	Pre-season	(Ukraine) Valeriy Kriventsov	21 August 2020
Prykarpattia Ivano-Frankivsk	(Ukraine) Volodymyr Kovalyuk	Mutual consent	2 September 2020	Pre-season	(Ukraine) Ruslan Mostovyi	4 September 2020
Krystal Kherson	(Ukraine) Eduard Khavrov	Resigned	28 September 2020	16th	(Ukraine) Serhiy Valyayev	1 October 2020
Nyva Ternopil	(Ukraine) Vasyl Malyk	Resigned	10 October 2020	11th	(Ukraine) Ihor Bilan	10 October 2020
Obolon Kyiv	(Ukraine) Valeriy Ivashchenko	Changed to assistant	17 October 2020	15th	(Ukraine) Pavlo Yakovenko	18 October 2020
Krystal Kherson	(Ukraine) Serhiy Valyayev	Resigned	20 November 2020	16th	(Ukraine) Serhiy Shevtsov (interim)	21 November 2020
Kremin Kremenchuk	(Ukraine) Oleksandr Holovko	Mutual consent	11 December 2020	12th	(Ukraine) Oleksiy Hodin	6 January 2021
Krystal Kherson	(Ukraine) Serhiy Shevtsov (interim)	Resigned	8 January 2021	16th	(Ukraine) Vadym Yevtushenko	23 February 2021
Chornomorets Odesa	(Ukraine) Serhiy Kovalets	Mutual consent	17 February 2021	3rd	(Ukraine) Oleksiy Antonov	18 February 2021
Nyva Ternopil	(Ukraine) Ihor Bilan	Mutual consent	12 April 2021	13th	(Ukraine) Ihor Klymovskyi	13 April 2021
Kremin Kremenchuk	(Ukraine) Oleksiy Hodin	Resigned	30 April 2021	14th	(Ukraine) Serhiy Svystun (interim)	30 April 2021
Prykarpattia Ivano-Frankivsk	(Ukraine) Ruslan Mostovyi	Sacked	1 May 2021	15th	(Ukraine) Oleh Rypan (interim)	1 May 2021
Obolon Kyiv	(Ukraine) Pavlo Yakovenko	Mutual consent	5 May 2021	8th	(Ukraine) Valeriy Ivashchenko (interim)	5 May 2021

== League table ==
Pos	Team	Pld	W	D	L	GF	GA	GD	Pts	Promotion, qualification or relegation
1	Veres Rivne (P, C)	30	21	5	4	56	21	+35	68	Promotion to Ukrainian Premier League
2	Chornomorets Odesa (P)	30	18	7	5	45	23	+22	61	Promotion to Ukrainian Premier League
3	Metalist 1925 Kharkiv (P)	30	16	8	6	36	22	+14	56	Promotion to Ukrainian Premier League
4	Mykolaiv (R)	30	15	8	7	49	23	+26	53	Relegation to Ukrainian Second League
5	Ahrobiznes Volochysk	30	15	7	8	46	27	+19	52	
6	Alians Lypova Dolyna	30	14	9	7	46	31	+15	51	
7	Volyn Lutsk	30	13	7	10	39	28	+11	46	
8	Obolon Kyiv	30	13	4	13	44	35	+9	43	
9	Hirnyk-Sport Horishni Plavni	30	11	5	14	43	45	−2	38	
10	VPK-Ahro Shevchenkivka	30	11	4	15	30	48	−18	37	
11	Polissia Zhytomyr	30	9	8	13	32	37	−5	35	
12	Avanhard Kramatorsk	30	9	5	16	32	51	−19	32	
13	Nyva Ternopil	30	8	7	15	30	50	−20	31	
14	Prykarpattia Ivano-Frankivsk	30	8	6	16	25	45	−20	30	
15	Kremin Kremenchuk	30	6	6	18	23	50	−27	24	
16	Krystal Kherson (R)	30	3	4	23	21	61	−40	13	Relegation to Ukrainian Second League

Updated to match(es) played on 12 June 2021. Source: PFL.ua
Rules for classification: 1) Points; 2) Head-to-head points; 3) Head-to-head goal difference; 4) Head-to-head goals scored; 5) Goal difference in all games; 6) Goals scored in all games (Note: calculation by criteria indicated in rules 2, 3, 4 is conducted with consideration of all teams that have an equal number of tournament points at the moment of calculation and not only among those which after preliminary criteria have appeared more successful).
(C) Champions; (P) Promoted; (R) Relegated

=== Results ===
Home \ Away	AHR	ALD	AVK	CHO	HIS	KRE	KRY	M25	MYK	NYV	OBL	POL	PRY	VER	VOL	VPK
Ahrobiznes Volochysk		2–1	1–0	1–0	1–1	5–1	4–2	1–2	1–1	4–0	1–0	3–2	3–0	0–0	0–0	1–2
Alians Lypova Dolyna	1–1		1–1	0–0	0–1	1–1	1–0	0–0	1–0	4–0	1–0	4–2	4–1	2–1	0–2	3–2
Avanhard Kramatorsk	1–1	0–3		1–2	0–3	2–1	2–1	0–1	0–1	3–1	1–2	0–3	3–1	1–2	2–1	2–3
Chornomorets Odesa	0–1	0–2	3–1		1–1	2–1	4–0	2–0	2–0	1–2	1–1	2–1	3–0	1–0	1–0	2–0
Hirnyk-Sport Horishni Plavni	0–0	2–3	0–2	0–1		2–0	3–0	3–0	0–3	4–1	2–3	0–2	1–1	1–2	0–3	1–2
Kremin Kremenchuk	0–1	0–2	0–0	1–1	1–1		1–0	0–4	1–1	1–3	1–0	0–2	0–1	1–2	1–2	2–0
Krystal Kherson	1–4	0–0	1–2	0–4	1–3	1–2		1–2	1–2	1–1	3–2	0–1	0–1	2–3	0–1	1–2
Metalist 1925 Kharkiv	1–0	2–1	2–1	0–1	3–2	0–1	1–0		1–0	1–1	0–1	0–0	1–0	4–1	1–1	1–2
MFC Mykolaiv	0–2	2–0	0–0	1–1	6–1	2–0	6–0	1–2		4–0	5–3	0–1	1–0	0–0	2–1	1–0
Nyva Ternopil	1–0	1–1	1–1	0–1	0–3 (Note: According to the UAF CDC decision of 9 April 2021, FC Nyva Ternopil was awarded technical loss (0:3) (for late announcement the visiting club and the PFL by the hosting club about place and start of the match), and the team of Hirnyk-Sport Horishni Plavni – technical victory (3:0).)	2–2	2–0	1–2	0–0		2–1	2–0	2–1	0–1	0–2	1–2
Obolon Kyiv	1–0	2–0	5–0	2–3	0–1	3–0	0–1	1–1	1–1	2–1		3–0	4–1	0–2	2–1	0–0
Polissia Zhytomyr	1–3	1–2	1–2	1–1	3–2	2–0	1–1	0–0	1–3	0–1	1–2		1–1	0–0	1–0	3–1
Prykarpattia Ivano-Frankivsk	2–1	1–0	3–1	1–1	1–2	1–0	1–1	0–3	0–1	2–1	1–2	1–1		0–1	2–0	0–1
Veres Rivne	2–0	3–3	5–1	4–0	3–0	2–1	2–0	0–0	3–1	3–1	1–0	2–0	3–0		2–0	1–0
Volyn Lutsk	2–1	2–2	0–1	1–2	2–0	2–3	2–0	0–0	0–0	2–2	2–1	1–0	2–0	2–1		2–0
VPK-Ahro Shevchenkivka	2–3	1–3	2–1	0–2	0–3	3–0	1–2	0–1	0–4	1–0	1–0	0–0	1–1	0–4	1–1	

Updated to match(es) played on 12 June 2021. Source: Calendar (in Ukrainian)
Legend: Blue = home team win; Yellow = draw; Red = away team win.

== Top goalscorers ==
As of 12 June 2021

Rank	Scorer	Team	Goals (Pen.)
1	(Ukraine) Ruslan Chernenko	Ahrobiznes Volochysk	15 (9)
2	(Ukraine) Mykhaylo Shestakov	Veres Rivne	13 (2)
2	(Ukraine) Yuriy Batyushyn	Hirnyk-Sport / Metalist 1925	13 (6)
4	(Ukraine) Bohdan Orynchak	Volyn Lutsk	11 (4)
5	(Ukraine) Bohdan Kushnirenko	MFC Mykolaiv	10 (8)
6	(Ukraine) Serhiy Kyslenko	Nyva Ternopil	9
6	(Ukraine) Oleksandr Batalskyi	Obolon Kyiv	9 (1)
6	(Ukraine) Mykola Ahapov	Alians Lypova Dolyna	9 (2)
9	(Ukraine) Artur Murza	Hirnyk-Sport / Obolon	8 (1)
10	(Ukraine) Volodymyr Odaryuk	MFC Mykolaiv	7
10	(Ukraine) Hennadiy Pasich	Veres Rivne	7
10	(Ukraine) Robert Hehedosh	Veres Rivne	7 (1)
10	(Ukraine) Kostyantyn Yaroshenko	Alians Lypova Dolyna	7 (1)
10	(Ukraine) Ihor Semenyna	Krystal / Nyva	7 (2)
10	(Ukraine) Mykhaylo Serhiychuk	Veres Rivne	7 (4)

== Awards ==
=== Monthly awards ===
The award is being selected on initiative of the PFL media partner UA-Football.

Month	Player of the Month		
Month	Player	Club	Reference
September 2020	(Ukraine) Bohdan Kohut	Veres Rivne	
October 2020	(Ukraine) Robert Hehedosh	Veres Rivne	
November 2020	(Ukraine) Oleksiy Maydanevych	Obolon Kyiv	
April 2021	(Ukraine) Dmytro Kryskiv	Metalist 1925 Kharkiv	
May 2021	(Ukraine) Mykola Ahapov	Alians Lypova Dolyna	
June 2021	(Ukraine) Vitaliy Dakhnovskyi	Veres Rivne	

=== Round awards ===
Round	Player			Coach		
Round	Player	Club	Reference	Coach	Club	Reference
Round 1	(Ukraine) Serhiy Bilous	Kremin Kremenchuk		(Ukraine) Oleksandr Holovko	Kremin Kremenchuk	
Round 2	(Ukraine) Roman Hahun	Ahrobiznes Volochysk		(Ukraine) Valeriy Kriventsov	Metalist 1925 Kharkiv	
Round 3	(Ukraine) Vladyslav Horbachenko	VPK-Ahro Shevchenkivka		(Ukraine) Serhiy Kovalets	Chornomorets Odesa	
Round 4	(Ukraine) Artur Murza	Hirnyk-Sport Horishni Plavni		(Ukraine) Ihor Zhabchenko	Hirnyk-Sport Horishni Plavni	
Round 5	(Ukraine) Ihor Sikorskyi	Volyn Lutsk		(Ukraine) Yuriy Virt	Veres Rivne	
Round 6	(Ukraine) Serhiy Kravchenko	MFC Mykolaiv		(Ukraine) Illya Blyznyuk	MFC Mykolaiv	
Round 7	(Ukraine) Robert Hehedosh	Veres Rivne		(Ukraine) Volodymyr Knysh (director) (Note: Being diagnosed with the COVID-19 and quarantined, the club's manager Serhiy Solovyov was temporarily spotted by the club's director in position of head coach)	VPK-Ahro Shevchenkivka	
Round 8	(Ukraine) Vasyl Lytvynenko	Obolon Kyiv		(Ukraine) Serhiy Shyshchenko	Polissia Zhytomyr	
Round 9	(Ukraine) Yuriy Kozyrenko	Hirnyk-Sport Horishni Plavni		(Ukraine) Ihor Zhabchenko (2)	Hirnyk-Sport Horishni Plavni	
Round 10	(Ukraine) Artem Kovbasa	Chornomorets Odesa		(Ukraine) Pavlo Yakovenko	Obolon Kyiv	
Round 11	(Ukraine) Dzhemal Kyzylatesh	Volyn Lutsk		(Ukraine) Vasyl Sachko	Volyn Lutsk	
Round 12	(Ukraine) Serhiy Zahynailov	Alians Lypova Dolyna		(Ukraine) Oleksandr Chyzhevskyi	Ahrobiznes Volochysk	
Round 13	(Ukraine) Oleksandr Batalskyi	Obolon Kyiv		(Ukraine) Serhiy Kovalets (2)	Chornomorets Odesa	
Round 14	(Ukraine) Mykhailo Shestakov	Veres Rivne		(Ukraine) Illia Blyzniuk (2)	MFC Mykolaiv	
Round 15	(Ukraine) Oleksiy Maidanevych	Obolon Kyiv		(Ukraine) Oleksandr Chyzhevskyi (2)	Ahrobiznes Volochysk	
Round 16	(Ukraine) Bohdan Orynchak	Volyn Lutsk		(Ukraine) Yuriy Virt (2)	Veres Rivne	
winter break
Round 17	(Ukraine) Yuriy Romanyuk	Ahrobiznes Volochysk		(Ukraine) Vasyl Sachko (2)	Volyn Lutsk	
Round 18	(Ukraine) Volodymyr Odaryuk	MFC Mykolaiv		(Ukraine) Valeriy Kriventsov (2)	Metalist 1925 Kharkiv	
Round 19	(Ukraine) Mykola Hayduchyk	Veres Rivne		(Ukraine) Yuriy Virt (3)	Veres Rivne	
Round 20	(Ukraine) Serhiy Panasenko	Veres Rivne		(Ukraine) Serhiy Solovyov	VPK-Ahro Shevchenkivka	
Round 21	(Ukraine) Roman Honcharenko	Veres Rivne		(Ukraine) Ruslan Mostovyi	Prykarpattia Ivano-Frankivsk	
Round 22	(Ukraine) Vladyslav Sharay	Alians Lypova Dolyna		(Ukraine) Illia Blyznyuk (3)	MFC Mykolaiv	
Round 23	(Ukraine) Stanislav Koval	Polissya Zhytomyr		(Ukraine) Yuriy Virt (4)	Veres Rivne	
Round 24	(Ukraine) Ivan Holovkin	Krystal Kherson		(Ukraine) Serhiy Shyshchenko (2)	Polissya Zhytomyr	
Round 25	(Ukraine) Mykola Ahapov	Alians Lypova Dolyna		(Ukraine) Oleksiy Horodov	Avanhard Kramatorsk	
Round 26	(Ukraine) Vitaliy Ponomar	Metalist 1925 Kharkiv		(Ukraine) Valeriy Kryventsov (3)	Metalist 1925 Kharkiv	
Round 27	(Ukraine) Kostyantyn Yaroshenko	Alians Lypova Dolyna		(Ukraine) Valeriy Ivashchenko	Obolon Kyiv	
Round 28	(Ukraine) Serhiy Shvets	Polissya Zhytomyr		(Ukraine) Oleksiy Antonov	Chornomorets Odesa	
Round 29	(Ukraine) Artem Habelok	Metalist 1925 Kharkiv		(Ukraine) Serhiy Shyshchenko (3)	Polissia Zhytomyr	
Round 30	(Ukraine) Oleksandr Byelyayev	VPK-Ahro Shevchenkivka		(Ukraine) Serhiy Solovyov (2)	VPK-Ahro Shevchenkivka	

== Number of teams by region ==
Number	Region	Team(s)
2	Poltava Oblast	Kremin and Hirnyk-Sport
1	Dnipropetrovsk Oblast	VPK-Ahro
1	Donetsk Oblast	Avanhard
1	Ivano-Frankivsk Oblast	Prykarpattia
1	Kharkiv Oblast	Metalist 1925
1	Kherson Oblast	Krystal
1	Khmelnytskyi Oblast	Ahrobiznes
1	Kyiv Oblast	Obolon
1	Mykolaiv Oblast	Mykolaiv
1	Odesa Oblast	Chornomorets
1	Rivne Oblast	Veres
1	Sumy Oblast	Alians
1	Ternopil Oblast	Nyva
1	Volyn Oblast	Volyn
1	Zhytomyr Oblast	Polissia

== See also ==
- 2020–21 Ukrainian Premier League
- 2020–21 Ukrainian Second League
- 2020–21 Ukrainian Football Amateur League
- 2020–21 Ukrainian Cup
- List of Ukrainian football transfers summer 2020
- List of Ukrainian football transfers winter 2020–21
