= 2020–21 FC Chornomorets Odesa season =

FC Chornomorets Odesa
2020–21 season
- General Director: Anatoly Mysyura
- Manager: Oleksiy Antonov (from March 1, 2021); Serhiy Kovalets (until February 17, 2021)
- Stadium: Chornomorets Stadium
- Ukrainian First League: 2nd of 16 (promoted)
- Ukrainian Cup: Round of 64 (1/32)
- Top goalscorer: League: Artur Avahimyan (6), Viktor Lykhovydko (6); All: Artur Avahimyan (8)
Home colours	Away colours	Third colours

The 2020–21 season was the 83rd season in the club's history and the 30th season of Odesa football club "Chornomorets" in the domestic league/cup of Ukraine. "The Sailors" competed in the Ukrainian First League and Ukrainian Cup.

== Season overview ==
=== August 2020 ===
- August 29, 2020 "Chornomorets" successfully started a new season. In the first preliminary round of the Ukrainian Cup 2020/21 "sailors" played in the city of Nova Kakhovka and defeated local FC "Enerhiya" (3:2). Artur Avahimyan scored his first goal double playing for Odesa team.

=== September 2020 ===
- September 5, 2020 In the 1st round of the national first league championship Odesa team played in Kramatorsk, where it beat 2:1 local club "Avanhard". Dmytro Pospelov scored his first goal playing for "Chornomorets".
- September 11, 2020 Match of 2nd round of the Ukrainian championship "sailors" played at home 1:1 with "Girnyk-Sport" from the town of Horishni Plavni. Viktor Lykhovydko scored his first goal playing for "Chornomorets".
- September 16, 2020 "Chornomorets" lost 0:1 game of the 1/32 round of the Ukrainian Cup 2020/21 against the team "Mykolaiv" and dropped out of this tournament.
- September 20, 2020 Match of 3rd round of the Ukrainian championship "sailors" played in Kyiv, where they defeated (3:2) local club "Obolon". Artem Kovbasa scored his first goal playing for "Chornomorets".
- September 22, 2020 All-Ukrainian Association of Football Coaches has recognized the head coach of "Chornomorets" Serhiy Kovalets as the best coach of the third round of the Ukrainian championship among the first league teams.
- September 26, 2020 In the 4th round of the national championship Odesa team defeated at home (1:0) "Veres" from Rivne. It was first home victory of "Chornomorets" in this season.

=== October 2020 ===
- October 6, 2020 Match of the 5th round of the Ukrainian championship "sailors" drew 1:1 in Ivano-Frankivsk with the local club "Prykarpattia".
- October 11, 2020 In the 6th round of the national championship Odesa team played 1:1 in the city of Bucha with the team "Polissya" (Zhytomyr).
- October 16, 2020 Match of the 7th round of the Ukrainian championship "sailors" played at home, and defeated 2:1 "Kremin" from Kremenchuk. Vladyslav Buhay scored his first goal playing for "Chornomorets".
- October 21, 2020 In the 8th round of the national championship Odesa team played in Dnipro, where it beat 2:0 "VPK-Ahro".
- October 26, 2020 Match of the 9th round of the Ukrainian championship "sailors" played at home against "Nyva" from Ternopil, and suffered first defeat of the season (1:2).
- October 31, 2020 In the 10th round of the national championship Odesa team at home defeated "Mykolaiv" 2:0. Artem Kovbasa scored his first goal double playing for Odesa team.

=== November 2020 ===
- November 5, 2020 Match of the 11th round of the Ukrainian championship "sailors" played at home against "Ahrobiznes" from Volochysk, and were beaten (0:1).
- November 10, 2020 In the game of 12th round of the national championship, Odesa team played in the city of Kherson, where they defeated (4:0) the local "Krystal". Stanislav Mykytsey and Oleh Kozhushko scored their first goals for "Chornomorets".
- November 15, 2020 Match of the 13th round of the Ukrainian championship "sailors" played at home against "Metalist 1925" from Kharkiv, and won 2:0.
- November 20, 2020 In the 14th round of the national championship Odesa team played 0:0 in the city of Sumy opposed to "Alians" (Lypova Dolyna).
- November 23, 2020 Match of the 15th round of the first league "Chornomorets" — "Volyn" (Lutsk) was postponed due to the flash of COVID-19 in the Odesa club.
- November 25, 2020 Due to the outbreak of COVID-19 in the Odesa club match of the 16th round of the first league "Chornomorets" — "Avanhard" (Kramatorsk) was also postponed.

=== March 2021 ===
- March 5, 2021 In the postponed match of 16th round of the national championship "Chornomorets" beat at home (3:1) "Avanhard" (Kramatorsk). Artem Kozak scored his first goal playing for "Chornomorets".
- March 12, 2021 In the postponed game of 15th round of the championship of Ukraine "sailors" defeated at home (1:0) "Volyn" (Lutsk).
- March 19, 2021 In the match of 17th round of the national championship Odesa team beat 1:0 "Hirnyk-Sport" (Horishni Plavni) in Kremenchuk. Danyil Sukhoruchko scored his first goal playing for "Chornomorets".
- March 26, 2021 Match of 18th round of the Ukrainian championship "sailors" played at home 1:1 against FC "Obolon" (Kyiv). Beka Vachiberadze scored his first goal playing for "Chornomorets".
- March 31, 2021 In the match of 19th round of the national championship Odesa team played in Lviv, and lost 0:4 against "Veres" (Rivne). This was first away defeat of "Chornomorets" in the current Ukrainian championship.

=== April 2021 ===
- April 5, 2021 Match of 20th round of the Ukrainian championship "sailors" played in Odesa, where they beat 3:0 "Prykarpattia" (Ivano-Frankivsk).
- April 10, 2021 In the match of 21st round of the national championship Odesa team beat at home 2:1 "Polissya" (Zhytomyr). Maksym Melnychuk scored his first goal playing for "Chornomorets".
- April 16, 2021 Match of 22nd round of the Ukrainian championship took place in Kremenchuk, where "sailors" drew 1:1 with the local club "Kremin". Serhiy Kravchenko scored his first goal playing for "Chornomorets".
- April 23, 2021 In the match of 23rd round of the national championship Odesa team beat at home 2:0 "VPK-Ahro".
- April 30, 2021 Match of 24th round of the Ukrainian championship "sailors" played in Lviv, where they beat 1:0 "Nyva" (Ternopil).

=== May 2021 ===
- May 7, 2021 In the match of 25th round of the national championship "Chornomorets" played 1:1 in Mykolaiv against local MFC "Mykolaiv".
- May 15, 2021 Match of 26th round of the Ukrainian championship took place in Volochysk, where "sailors" lost 0:1 to the local club "Ahrobiznes".
- May 21, 2021 In the match of 27th round of the national championship "Chornomorets" at home won 4:0 against "Krystal" from Kherson. Illya Putrya scored his first goal playing for "Chornomorets".
- May 27, 2021 Match of 28th round of the Ukrainian championship took place in Kharkiv, where "sailors" won 1:0 against the local club "Metalist 1925", and got a ticket to the Ukrainian Premier League ahead of schedule.

=== June 2021 ===
- June 5, 2021 In the match of 29th round of the national championship "Chornomorets" at home lost 0:2 against "Alians" from Lypova Dolyna.
- June 12, 2021 Match of 30th round of the Ukrainian championship took place in Lutsk, where "sailors" won 2:1 against the local club "Volyn".

== Competitions ==
=== Ukrainian First League ===
==== Results summary ====
Overall								Home						Away					
Pld	W	D	L	GF	GA	GD	Pts	W	D	L	GF	GA	GD	W	D	L	GF	GA	GD
30	18	7	5	45	23	+22	61	10	2	3	25	10	+15	8	5	2	20	13	+7

Last updated: 23 April 2021.
Source: Soccerway

===== Results by round =====
Round	1	2	3	4	5	6	7	8	9	10	11	12	13	14	15	16	17	18	19	20	21	22	23	24	25	26	27	28	29	30
Ground	A	H	A	H	A	A	H	A	H	H	H	A	H	A	H	H	A	H	A	H	H	A	H	A	A	A	H	A	H	A
Result	W	D	W	W	D	D	W	W	L	W	L	W	W	D	W	W	W	D	L	W	W	D	W	W	D	L	W	W	L	W
Position	3	3	1	1	1	1	1	1	1	1	1	1	1	2	2	1	1	1	2	2	2	2	2	2	2	2	2	2	2	2

Updated to match(es) played on 7 June 2021. Source: Soccerway
A = Away; H = Home; W = Win; D = Draw; L = Loss

=== Ukrainian Cup ===
29 August 2020 First Round	Enerhiya Nova Kakhovka	2 - 3	Chornomorets Odesa	Nova Kakhovka
17:00 EET	Andriy Gavrylenko 30'; Oleksandr Shevchenko (yellow card) 45'; Maksim Bohdanov (yellow card) 74'; vadim Rossokhatyi 81'; Oleksandr Soldatov (yellow card) 87'	Report	Sikorskyi 14'; Avahimyan 34' 45+2' (yellow card) 67'; Zubeyko (yellow card) 65'; Pospelov (yellow card) 65'	Stadium: Enerhiya Stadium; Referee: (Ukraine) Pavlo Dubrovets

16 September 2020 Second Round	Mykolaiv	1 - 0	Chornomorets Odesa	Mykolaiv
16:00 EET	Vladyslav Okhronchuk (yellow card) 13'; Yavorskyi 42'	Report	Yakymiv (yellow card) 5'; Avahimyan (yellow card) 11'; Khamelyuk (yellow card) 36'; Lykhovydko (yellow card) 59'	Stadium: Tsentralnyi Stadion; Referee: (Ukraine) Igor Paskhal
