= Roman Honcharenko =

Ukrainian footballer

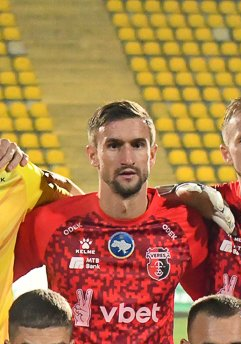

Personal information
- Full name: Roman Oleksandrovych Honcharenko
- Date of birth: 16 November 1993 (age 32)
- Place of birth: Potash, Cherkasy Oblast, Ukraine
- Height: 1.84 m (6 ft 0 in)
- Position: Centre-back

Team information
- Current team: Veres Rivne
- Number: 33

Youth career
- 2010: Talne

Senior career*
Years	Team	Apps	(Gls)
- Talne
- Illichivets Uman
2013–2015	UTK-Yatran	10	(1)
2015–2017	Cherkaskyi Dnipro	44	(1)
2017–2019	Inhulets Petrove	31	(2)
2019	Polissya Zhytomyr	10	(1)
2019–2020	Kremin Kremenchuk	19	(1)
2020–2022	Veres Rivne	45	(3)
2022–2024	Kolos Kovalivka	22	(1)
2024–	Veres Rivne	47	(0)
- * Club domestic league appearances and goals as of 3 June 2026

Roman Oleksandrovych Honcharenko (Ukrainian: Роман Олександрович Гончаренко; born 16 November 1993) is a Ukrainian professional footballer who plays as a centre-back for Ukrainian club Veres Rivne.

== Career ==
On 7 February 2020, Honcharenko signed for Ukrainian Second League club Veres Rivne.

On 19 June 2024, Honcharenko returned to Veres Rivne on a two-year contract.

== Career statistics ==
=== Club ===
As of 4 February 2022

Appearances and goals by club, season and competition
Club	Season	League			Cup		Continental		Other		Total	
Club	Season	Division	Apps	Goals	Apps	Goals	Apps	Goals	Apps	Goals	Apps	Goals
UTK-Yatran	2015	Cherkasy Oblast Championship	10	1	0	0	0	0	0	0	10	1
Cherkaskyi Dnipro	2015–16	Ukrainian First League	13	0	0	0	0	0	0	0	13	0
Cherkaskyi Dnipro	2016–17	Ukrainian First League	31	1	2	0	0	0	0	0	33	1
Cherkaskyi Dnipro	Total		44	1	2	0	0	0	0	0	46	1
Inhulets Petrove	2017–18	Ukrainian First League	26	2	1	0	0	0	0	0	27	2
Inhulets Petrove	2018–19	Ukrainian First League	5	0	3	0	0	0	0	0	8	0
Inhulets Petrove	Total		31	2	4	0	0	0	0	0	35	2
Polissya Zhytomyr	2018–19	Ukrainian Second League	10	1	0	0	0	0	0	0	10	1
Kremin Kremenchuk	2019–20	Ukrainian First League	19	1	2	1	0	0	0	0	21	2
Veres Rivne	2019–20	Ukrainian Second League	0	0	0	0	0	0	2	0	2	0
Veres Rivne	2020–21	Ukrainian First League	27	3	4	0	0	0	0	0	31	3
Veres Rivne	2021–22	Ukrainian Premier League	18	0	2	0	0	0	0	0	20	0
Veres Rivne	Total		45	3	6	0	0	0	2	0	53	3
Career total			159	9	14	1	0	0	2	0	175	10
