= Horodov =

Horodov is a Ukrainian surname. Notable people with the surname include:

- Oleksiy Horodov (born 1978), Ukrainian footballer
- Valeriy Horodov (born 1961), Ukrainian footballer and manager
