= Bohdan Kohut =

Ukrainian footballer (born 1987)

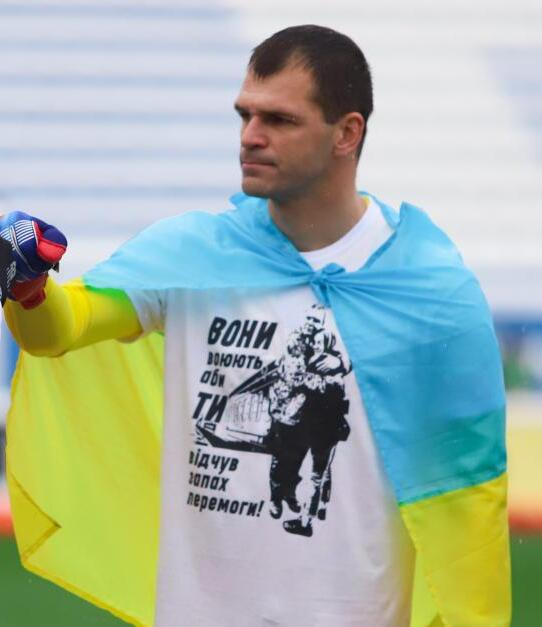

Personal information
- Full name: Bohdan Ihorovych Kohut
- Date of birth: 10 October 1987 (age 39)
- Place of birth: Lviv, Soviet Union (now Ukraine)
- Height: 1.90 m (6 ft 3 in)
- Position: Goalkeeper

Youth career
- 2001–2005: Karpaty Lviv

Senior career*
Years	Team	Apps	(Gls)
2005–2010	Karpaty Lviv	0	(0)
2005–2008	Karpaty-2 Lviv	34	(0)
2009–2010	→ Spartakus Szarowola (loan)	13	(0)
2011	Lviv	14	(0)
2011	Obolon Kyiv	1	(0)
2011–2012	Sevastopol	1	(0)
2011–2012	Sevastopol-2	9	(0)
2012–2014	Bukovyna Chernivtsi	52	(0)
2015	Bukovyna Chernivtsi	10	(0)
2015	Zaria Bălți	0	(0)
2016	Desna Chernihiv	7	(0)
2016–2017	Veres Rivne	24	(0)
2018–2019	Volyn Lutsk	25	(0)
2019	ODEK Orzhiv	9	(0)
2020–2025	Veres Rivne	92	(0)
- * Club domestic league appearances and goals as of 14 July 2025

Bohdan Ihorovych Kohut (Ukrainian: Богдан Ігорович Когут; born 10 October 1987) is a Ukrainian professional footballer who plays as a goalkeeper.

== Career ==
=== Karpaty Lviv ===
He is a product of Karpaty Lviv academy.

=== Sevastopol ===
In August 2011 he signed a contract with Ukrainian First League club Sevastopol until June 2014.

=== Veres Rivne ===
In 2020 he moved to Veres Rivne and won the 2020-21 Ukrainian First League. On 27 December 2022 he extended his contract with the club until June 2024.

== Honours ==
Veres Rivne

- Ukrainian First League: 2020–21

Individual

- Ukrainian First League Player of the Month: September 2020
- Ukrainian First League Team of the Season: 2020–21
- Ukrainian Premier League most clean sheets: 2021–22
