= Ruslan Chernenko =

Ukrainian professional footballer

Personal information
- Full name: Ruslan Serhiyovych Chernenko
- Date of birth: 29 September 1992 (age 34)
- Place of birth: Kyiv, Ukraine
- Height: 1.77 m (5 ft 9 1/2 in)
- Position: Midfielder

Team information
- Current team: Podillya Khmelnytskyi
- Number: 18

Youth career
- –2006: Dynamo Kyiv
- 2006–2009: Arsenal Kyiv

Senior career*
Years	Team	Apps	(Gls)
2009–2014	Arsenal Kyiv	1	(0)
2012–2013	→ Desna Chernihiv (loan)	19	(3)
2014	RVUFK Kyiv	0	(0)
2015	Chaika Petropavlivska Borshchahivka	10	(2)
2015–2018	Arsenal Kyiv	66	(12)
2018–2022	Ahrobiznes Volochysk	90	(28)
2022	→ Marek Dupnitsa (loan)	8	(3)
2022	Spartak Varna	7	(0)
2022–2026	Obolon Kyiv	91	(7)
2026–	Podillya Khmelnytskyi	14	(5)
- * Club domestic league appearances and goals as of 21 November 2026

Ruslan Serhiyovych Chernenko (Ukrainian: Руслан Сергійович Черненко; born 29 September 1992) is a Ukrainian professional footballer plays for Podillya Khmelnytskyi.

== Career ==
At the age of 15, Chernenko joined the Arsenal Kyiv Academy, where he trained until 2009.

=== Desna Chernihiv (Loan) ===
In 2012 he was loaned to Desna Chernihiv where he played 19 matches and then he returned to Arsenal Kyiv.

=== Ahrobiznes Volochysk & Marek Dupnitsa ===
In January 2022, Chernenko joined Bulgarian Second League team Marek Dupnitsa on loan from Ahrobiznes Volochysk. On 6 June 2022, he moved to the newly promoted to First League team Spartak Varna, signing a two-year contract.

=== Obolon Kyiv ===
In 2022 he moved to Obolon Kyiv in Ukrainian First League. In June 2025 his contract was extended his contract with the club for one year. On 2 July 2026, his contract was expired and wasn't renewed.

=== Podillya Khmelnytskyi ===
On 9 July 2026, he signed for Podillya Khmelnytskyi in Ukrainian Second League.

== Honours ==
=== Club ===
==== Desna Chernihiv ====
- Ukrainian Second League: 2012–13

==== Arsenal Kyiv ====
- Ukrainian First League: 2017–18

=== Individual ===
- Ukrainian First League top scorer: 2020-21
