= Yuriy Virt =

Ukrainian footballer (born 1974)

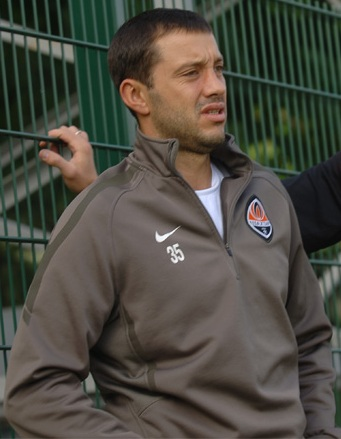
- Virt with Shakhtar Donetsk

Personal information
- Full name: Yury Mykolayovych Virt
- Date of birth: 4 May 1974 (age 52)
- Place of birth: Lviv, Ukrainian SSR
- Height: 1.78 m (5 ft 10 in)
- Position: Goalkeeper

Senior career*
Years	Team	Apps	(Gls)
1992–1995	Skala Stryi	72	(0)
1995–1997	Lviv	65	(0)
1997–1999	Metalurh Donetsk	40	(0)
1999–2002	Shakhtar Donetsk	64	(0)
1999–2000	→ Shakhtar-2 Donetsk	2	(0)
2002–2003	Metalurh Donetsk	15	(0)
2002–2003	→ Metalurh-2 Donetsk	5	(0)
2003–2004	Borysfen Boryspil	13	(0)
2003	→ Boreks-Borysfen Borodianka	1	(0)
2004–2007	Metalurh Donetsk	47	(0)
2007–2012	Shakhtar Donetsk	2	(0)
Total		326	(0)

International career
2001	Ukraine	2	(0)

Managerial career
- 2012–2013: Metalurh Donetsk (U19 assistant)
- 2013–2015: Metalurh Donetsk (U21 assistant)
- 2015–2016: Stal Dniprodzerzhynsk (assistant)
- 2017: Veres Rivne (assistant)
- 2017: Veres Rivne (caretaker)
- 2017: Veres Rivne
- 2018: Rukh Vynnyky
- 2019–2023: Veres Rivne
- 2024: Zviahel
- 2024–2025: Nyva Ternopil
- * Club domestic league appearances and goals

Yuriy Mykolayovych Virt (Ukrainian: Юрій Миколайович Вірт; born 4 May 1974) is a Ukrainian football manager and former player.

== Club career ==
As a goalkeeper, Virt played over 100 games for Metalurh Donetsk in the Ukrainian Premier League. In the beginning of the 1990s, he also played for a number of clubs from Lviv Oblast, including FC Skala Stryi and the first FC Lviv city team.

In September 2001, he played two games for the Ukraine national team earning clean sheets wins in both of them against Belarus and Armenia.

== Managerial career ==
After retiring from his playing career, Virt worked for Ukrainian Premier League club Metalurh Donetsk as a goalkeeper coach. Since 2017, he coached as a manager for Veres Rivne and Rukh Vynnyky. In June 2019, he was once again appointed as manager of Veres Rivne.

From 16 April until 28 July 2024 Virt worked as a manager at Zviahel.

From 17 September 2024 until 16 December 2025 he worked as a manager at Nyva Ternopil.

== Honours ==
Veres Rivne

- Ukrainian First League: 2020–21

Individual

- Ukrainian Premier League Best Coach Round 6: 2021–22
- Ukrainian Premier League Coach of the Month: August 2021, August-September 2022
