= Oleksandr Ivashchenko =

Ukrainian footballer

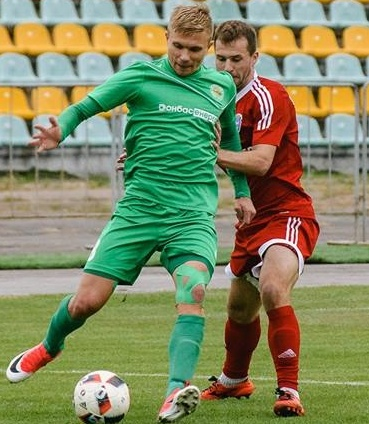

Personal information
- Date of birth: 19 February 1985 (age 41)
- Place of birth: Kyiv, Ukrainian SSR, Soviet Union
- Height: 1.77 m (5 ft 9 1/2 in)
- Position: Forward

Youth career
- 1998–2002: Dynamo Kyiv

Senior career*
Years	Team	Apps	(Gls)
2002	Dynamo-3 Kyiv	2	(0)
2005	Obolon Kyiv	17	(6)
2006–2008	Kryvbas Kryvyi Rih	37	(5)
2008	Illichivets Mariupol	2	(0)
2009	Arsenal Kyiv	9	(2)
2009–2010	Obolon Kyiv	17	(1)
2010–2013	Kryvbas Kryvyi Rih	40	(7)
2013	Obolon-Brovar Kyiv	14	(8)
2014–2015	Oleksandriya	24	(9)
2015	Desna Chernihiv	9	(0)
2016	Obolon-Brovar Kyiv	11	(1)
2017–2018	Avanhard Kramatorsk	35	(5)

International career
2005	Ukraine U-21	2	(0)

Managerial career
- 2019: Avanhard Kramatorsk (assistant)
- 2019–: Avanhard-2 Kramatorsk
- * Club domestic league appearances and goals

Oleksandr Ivashchenko (Ukrainian: Олександр Володимирович Іващенко; born 19 February 1985, in Soviet Union) is a Ukrainian football striker. At the moment – assistant of the head coach in the club Avanhard Kramatorsk.

Oleksandr has an older brother Valeriy Ivashchenko who also is former football player and now coach.

== Club career ==
Oleksandr is a pupil of the «Dynamo» football school in Kyiv. At the professional level in the «Dynamo»'s teams, he has been played only 2 games in 2002 as a part of the third club team that competed in the second league of the Ukrainian championship. In 2005, Ivashchenko contracted with the Kyiv team "Obolon Kyiv", acted as the main team in the matches of the first league, as well as for the second club team in the second league. At the end of the season 2004/05 he played in two games in the High League. Interestingly – all official documents say that Oleksandr Ivashchenko debuted in the upper division on 5 March 2006, against the FC "Metalurh" (Zaporizhya) (defeat 1:2) in the team FC "Kryvbas" (Kryvyi Rih), which Oleksandr moved to on early 2006. In fact, this happened on 28 May 2005, at the 70-th minute of the match, in which "Obolon" (Kyiv) played against FC "Borysfen" (Boryspil), which took place in the 28 rounds. This collision is due to the fact that in the start protocol, in the column "name", instead of "Oleksandr" was entered "Valeriy". This mistake was quite serious, as in "Obolon" at the same time played Oleksandr Ivashchenko's brother – Valeriy Ivashchenko. Due to the same mistake in the register of "played games in the High League," Oleksandr does not have more than 29 minutes of the match, in which "Obolon" played with the FC Metalurh (Donetsk). This confrontation took place on 16 June at the capital's Bannikov Stadium.

In the winter of 2006, Oleksandr Ivashchenko switched to the FC "Kryvbas": Oleksandr Kosevych, the head coach of the club from the High division, drew attention to the player who managed to score six goals in 17 games for the first half of the season in the First League. Ivashchenko was not confused and for 2,5 seasons played 37 games at the highest national level, scoring five goals. These figures could have been better, but Олег Таран, who began training FC "Kryvbas" since February 2007, had his own specific thoughts about the role of Ivashchenko in the team. As a result, Oleksandr spent the 2008/09 season playing on lease rights outside Kryvyi Rih. At first, it was Illichivets, and then – Arsenal Kyiv. In the summer of 2009, Ivashchenko became a player already familiar with "Obolon", which became a participant in the Ukrainian Premier League. But in Kyiv he played only the one season: Yuriy Maksymov, who was the coach of "Obolon" until 31 December 2009, and from 1 January, headed FC "Kryvbas", in the summer of 2010 invited Oleksandr to his team. The first season became for Ivashchenko the brightest: he struck the seven times the opponents' gate in 26 matches. This figure became the best in FC "Kryvbas" in that season. In the future, his affairs in FC "Kryvbas" were not very good. At first, the severe injury that Ivashchenko got at the end of 2011 made itself felt, and then, after a month of rehabilitation, a new trainer appeared in the FC "Kryvbas", who bet on leased players from the FC Dnipro. After FC "Kryvbas" was declared bankrupt, in the summer of 2013, Oleksandr switched to the "new-old" FC "Obolon-Brovar". Having played for this club half season, in February 2014, he went into the ranks of the first-ranking FC "Oleksandriya": Volodymyr Sharan drew attention to the fact that Ivashchenko, despite all the hardships, did not lose the ability to score goals (Oleksandr scored 8 in 15 games for FC "Obolon-Brovar"). In the second part of the season 2013/14 he scored 4 goals in 9 games. The next season, Ivashchenko became the champion of the First League in the FC "Oleksandriya". With this club, he also had to play in the Premier League, but he received a slight damage during the preseason gathering, which had to be cured within one month. However, Sharan did not wait, and the new contract with Oleksandr Ivashchenko was not signed. In August 2015, Oleksandr signed a six-month contract with an ambitious FC "Desna" (Chernihiv) for which he played nine matches. In March 2016, he signed a contract with FC "Obolon-Brovar" until the end of the 2015/16 season. After completing the contract, Ivashchenko supported a form of sport according to an individual schedule, hoping to find a new professional club in the winter transfer window. In February 2017, he became a player of the FC "Avanhard" – a team that is currently playing in the First League of Ukraine. Oleksandr explained his choice by the fact that this collective is coached by Oleksandr Kosevych whom he knows in joint work in FC "Kryvbas". In the summer of 2018, Ivashchenko finally decided that this year will be the last in his professional career. In the last, in the status of a professional player he came out on the field on 20 October: 17 minutes was played in the match FC "Avanhard" – FC "Balkany" (Zorya), which was held in Kramatorsk. At the end of January 2019, Oleksandr Ivashchenko officially entered the trainer's headquarters of the FC "Avanhard".
