= Yaroslav Vyshnyak =

Ukrainian footballer

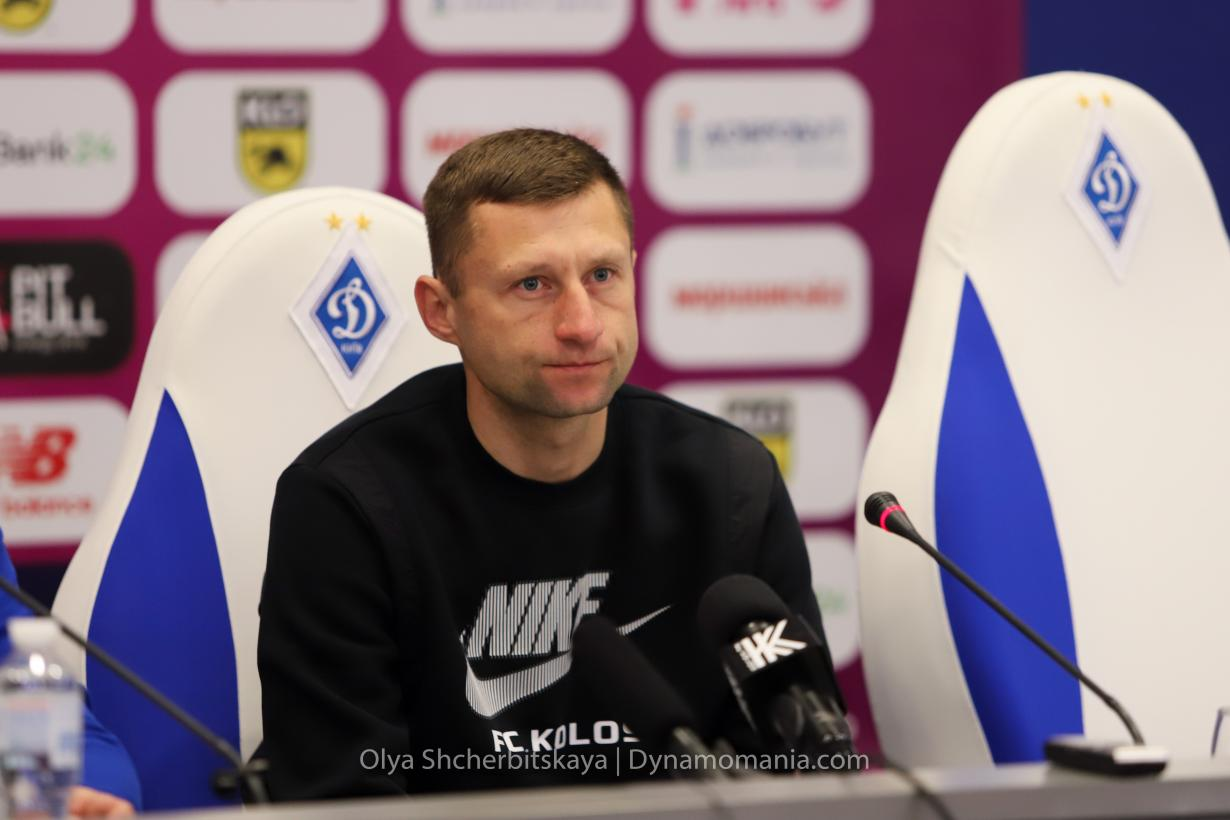

Personal information
- Full name: Yaroslav Vasylyovych Vyshnyak
- Date of birth: 22 July 1982 (age 44)
- Place of birth: Kyiv, Soviet Union (now Ukraine)
- Height: 1.79 m (5 ft 10 in)
- Position: Defender

Team information
- Current team: Kolos Kovalivka (vice-president)

Senior career*
Years	Team	Apps	(Gls)
2000–2004	Zirka Kirovohrad	100	(2)
2004–2005	Metalurh Zaporizhzhia	29	(0)
2005–2006	Zorya Luhansk	33	(3)
2007	Mykolaiv	13	(0)
2007	Zakarpattia Uzhhorod	9	(0)
2008–2009	Obolon Kyiv	9	(0)
2009	Volyn Lutsk	4	(0)
2009–2010	Nyva Ternopil	4	(0)
2010–2013	Putrivka	11	(0)
2014–2018	Kolos Kovalivka	66	(8)
Total		278	(13)

Managerial career
- 2012–2013: Putrivka
- 2018–2021: Kolos Kovalivka (assistant)
- 2021: Kolos Kovalivka (caretaker)
- 2021–2024: Kolos Kovalivka
- 2024–: Kolos Kovalivka (vice-president)
- * Club domestic league appearances and goals

Yaroslav Vyshnyak (Ukrainian: Ярослав Васильович Вишняк; born 22 July 1982) is a retired Ukrainian footballer who currently is a coach at Ukrainian Premier League club Kolos Kovalivka.
