= 2021–22 Ukrainian Premier League =

31st season of top-tier football league in Vyshcha Liha

VBet Liha (UPL)
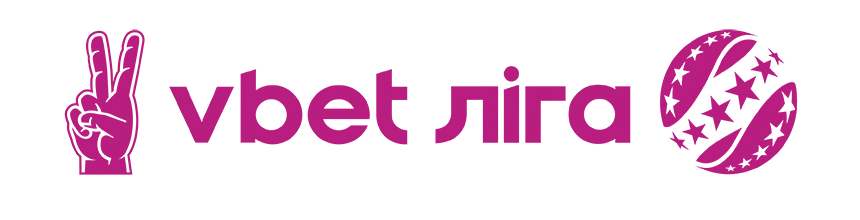
- Official logo
- Season: 2021–22
- Dates: 24 July 2021 – 26 April 2022
- Teams: 16
- Champions: Title not awarded
- Relegated: Desna Chernihiv; Mariupol
- Champions League: Shakhtar Donetsk; Dynamo Kyiv
- Europa League: Dnipro–1
- Europa Conference League: Zorya Luhansk; Vorskla Poltava
- Matches: 143
- Goals: 381 (2.66 per match)
- Top goalscorer: Artem Dovbyk (14 goals)
- Biggest home win: 7 goals Dynamo 7–0 Kolos (28 August 2021)
- Biggest away win: 5 goals Mariupol 0–5 Shakhtar (18 September 2021); Metalist 1925 1–6 Zorya (31 October 2021); Chornomorets 1–6 Dynamo (19 November 2021)
- Highest scoring: 7 goals 7 games
- Longest winning run: 8 matches Shakhtar Donetsk
- Longest unbeaten run: 15 matches Shakhtar Donetsk
- Longest winless run: 17 matches Mynai
- Longest losing run: 6 matches Mariupol; Metalist 1925
- Highest attendance: 28,073; Dynamo v Shakhtar (3 October 2021)
- Lowest attendance: 230; Inhulets v Kolos (18 September 2021) (Note: 6 games behind closed doors due to the COVID-19 pandemic)
- Total attendance: 480451
- Average attendance: 3533
- All statistics correct as of 12 December 2021.

The 2021–22 Ukrainian Premier League season, referred to as the VBet Liha for sponsorship reasons, was the 31st top-level football club competition since the fall of the Soviet Union and the 14th since the establishment of the Ukrainian Premier League. On 1 July 2021, UPL announced that the new title sponsor for the next three years will be another bookmaking company, VBet.

The defending champions were the 16-time winners Dynamo Kyiv.

The competition was abandoned due to the Russian invasion of Ukraine.

== Preparation ==
The 2021–22 season expanded again to 16 teams as part of the league's expansion plan.

Due to the low-intensity war with Russia that had been ongoing since 2014, teams from the Donbas area were forced to play elsewhere.

Due to the COVID-19 pandemic, attendance of football matches was limited and regulated by local health departments in each region.

Because of a conflict between the president of Olimpik Donetsk Vladyslav Helzin and the Ukrainian Association of Football officials over a post-match incident that culminated in sanctions against the Olimpik's president, Helzin decided to voluntarily withdraw his football club from the Ukrainian Premier League and transfer away ownership of the club. The decision took place just a couple of weeks before the start of the new season, with the calendar already set. Both PFL and UPL called on emergency clubs' meetings to confirm changes and reinstate membership of the already relegated Mynai in the UPL and relegate Olimpik Donetsk to the second tier (First League) instead. Due to this, the Round 1 match between Dynamo and its visiting opponent was suspended until a later date.

== Teams ==
This season, as it was announced earlier, the Ukrainian Premier League has been expanded to 16 teams, which includes 13 teams from the previous season and the top three teams from the 2020–21 Ukrainian First League.

=== Promoted teams ===
- Veres Rivne – the champion of the 2020–21 Ukrainian First League (return after a three-year absence)
- Chornomorets Odesa – runner-up of the 2020–21 Ukrainian First League (return after a two-year absence)
- Metalist 1925 Kharkiv – third place of the 2020–21 Ukrainian First League (debut, another club Metalist Kharkiv last competed in 2015–16)

=== Relegated teams ===
- Olimpik Donetsk – the 13th place team of the 2020–21 Ukrainian Premier League (ending their seven-year stay in the top-flight)

=== Location map ===
Home venues of teams in the 2021–22 Ukrainian Premier League.
Teams from a conflict zone (Shakhtar and Zorya) are playing their home games in different cities.

=== Stadiums ===
Three of the qualified to the date teams play their matches outside of home towns. The minimum threshold for the stadium's capacity in the UPL is 5,000 (Article 10, paragraph 7.2).

The following stadiums are regarded as home grounds:

Rank	Stadium	Place	Club	Capacity	Notes
1	NSC Olimpiyskiy	Kyiv	Dynamo Kyiv	70,050	
1	NSC Olimpiyskiy	Kyiv	Shakhtar Donetsk	70,050	used as home ground during the season
2	Metalist OSC	Kharkiv	Metalist 1925 Kharkiv	41,307	
3	Arena Lviv	Lviv	Lviv	34,915	
3	Arena Lviv	Lviv	Rukh Lviv	34,915	
4	Chornomorets Stadium	Odesa	Chornomorets Odesa	34,164	
5	Dnipro-Arena	Dnipro	Dnipro-1	31,003	
6	Butovsky Vorskla Stadium	Poltava	Vorskla Poltava	24,795	
7	Shukhevych Ternopil City Stadium	Ternopil	Lviv	15,150	used as home ground in Round 10
8	Zirka Stadium	Kropyvnytskyi	Inhulets Petrove	14,628	used as home ground during the season
9	Volodymyr Boiko Stadium	Mariupol	Mariupol	12,680	
10	Avanhard Stadium	Lutsk	Veres Rivne	12,080	used as home ground during the season
11	Avanhard Stadium	Uzhhorod	Mynai	12,000	
12	Slavutych-Arena	Zaporizhzhia	Zorya Luhansk	12,000	used as home ground during the season
13	CSC Nika Stadium	Oleksandriya	Oleksandriya	7,000	
14	Chernihiv Stadium	Chernihiv	Desna Chernihiv	5,500	
15	Kolos Stadium	Kovalivka	Kolos Kovalivka	5,000	

Notes

1. VERES: Veres Rivne main arena is still under renovations without concrete dates of being finished. In the beginning of June of 2021, the club confirmed the Lutsk Avanhard in neighboring Volyn Oblast as its home stadium (technically still staying within the historic Volhynia region).
2. INHULETS: While wishing to start the 2021–22 season at its new stadium, Inhulets will present its new arena with some delay.

=== Personnel and sponsorship ===
Team	President	Head coach	Captain	Kit manufacturer	Shirt sponsor
Chornomorets Odesa	Leonid Klimov	(Ukraine) Roman Hryhorchuk	(Ukraine) Serhiy Kravchenko	Kelme	Hefest
Desna Chernihiv	Volodymyr Levin	(Ukraine) Oleksandr Ryabokon		Nike	Parimatch
Dnipro-1	Maksym Bereza	(Croatia) Igor Jovićević	(Ukraine) Serhiy Lohinov	Nike	Parimatch
Dynamo Kyiv	Ihor Surkis	(Romania) Mircea Lucescu	(Ukraine) Serhiy Sydorchuk	New Balance	A-Bank
Inhulets Petrove	Oleksandr Povoroznyuk	(Ukraine) Serhiy Lavrynenko		Joma	etg.ua
Kolos Kovalivka	Andriy Zasukha	(Ukraine) Yaroslav Vyshnyak		Nike	Svitanok
Lviv	Bohdan Kopytko	(Belarus) Oleg Dulub		Jako	Parimatch
Mariupol	Tariq Mehmood Chaudhry	(Ukraine) Ostap Markevych	(Ukraine) Dmytro Myshnyov	Puma	Parimatch
Metalist 1925 Kharkiv	Yaroslav Vdovenko	(Ukraine) Valeriy Kriventsov	(Ukraine) Denys Sydorenko	Puma	AES group
Mynai	Valeriy Peresolyak	(Ukraine) Volodymyr Sharan	(Ukraine) Danylo Knysh	Kelme	FavBet
Oleksandriya	Serhiy Kuzmenko	(Ukraine) Yuriy Hura		Nike	AhroVista
Rukh Lviv	Hryhoriy Kozlovskyi	(Belarus) Leonid Kuchuk	(Ukraine) Yaroslav Martynyuk	Macron	First Casino
Shakhtar Donetsk	Rinat Akhmetov	(Italy) Roberto De Zerbi	(Ukraine) Andriy Pyatov	Puma	Parimatch
Veres Rivne	Ivan Nadieyin	(Ukraine) Yuriy Virt	(Ukraine) Bohdan Kohut	Kelme	Parimatch
Vorskla Poltava	Kostyantyn Zhevago	(Ukraine) Yuriy Maksymov	(Ukraine) Volodymyr Chesnakov	Nike	Ferrexpo
Zorya Luhansk	Yevhen Heller	(Ukraine) Viktor Skrypnyk	(Ukraine) Mykyta Shevchenko	Nike	Marsbet

=== Managerial changes ===
Team	Outgoing manager	Manner of departure	Date of vacancy	Table	Incoming manager	Date of appointment	Table
Shakhtar Donetsk	(Portugal) Luís Castro	Mutual agreement	12 May 2021	Pre-season	(Italy) Roberto De Zerbi	25 May 2021	Pre-season
Oleksandriya	(Ukraine) Volodymyr Sharan	Mutual agreement	13 May 2021	Pre-season	(Ukraine) Yuriy Hura	18 May 2021	Pre-season
Mynai	(Ukraine) Mykola Tsymbal	Changed position	15 June 2021	Pre-season	(Ukraine) Vasyl Kobin	15 June 2021	Pre-season
Chornomorets Odesa	(Ukraine) Oleksiy Antonov	Changed position	23 June 2021	Pre-season	(Ukraine) Yuriy Moroz	23 June 2021	Pre-season
Rukh Lviv	(Ukraine) Ivan Fedyk	Mutual agreement	4 August 2021	14th	(Belarus) Leonid Kuchuk	4 August 2021	14th
Lviv	(Ukraine) Anatoliy Bezsmertnyi	Resigned	25 August 2021	15th	(Ukraine) Taras Chopyk (interim)	25 August 2021	15th
Kolos Kovalivka	(Ukraine) Ruslan Kostyshyn	Resigned	29 August 2021	11th	(Belarus) Syarhey Kuznyatsow (interim)	29 August 2021	11th
Lviv	(Ukraine) Taras Chopyk (interim)	End of interim	6 September 2021	15th	(Belarus) Oleg Dulub	6 September 2021	15th
Mynai	(Ukraine) Vasyl Kobin	Fired	29 September 2021	15th	(Ukraine) Ihor Leonov	9 October 2021	15th
Kolos Kovalivka	(Belarus) Syarhey Kuznyatsow (interim)	Undisclosed	November 2021	11th	(Ukraine) Yaroslav Vyshnyak (interim)	November 2021	11th
Kolos Kovalivka	(Ukraine) Yaroslav Vyshnyak (interim)	Made permanent	28 November 2021	10th	(Ukraine) Yaroslav Vyshnyak	28 November 2021	10th
Mynai	(Ukraine) Ihor Leonov	Mutual agreement	16 December 2021	15th	(Ukraine) Volodymyr Sharan	14 January 2022	15th
Chornomorets Odesa	(Ukraine) Yuriy Moroz	Undisclosed	30 December 2021	13th	(Ukraine) Roman Hryhorchuk	30 December 2021	13th

Notes:

- In the UPL match protocols, Mykola Tsymbal remains the manager of Mynai despite the official club's announcement about return of Vasyl Kobin.

== League table ==
Pos	Team	Pld	W	D	L	GF	GA	GD	Pts	Qualification or relegation
1	Shakhtar Donetsk	18	15	2	1	49	10	+39	47	Qualification for the Champions League group stage
2	Dynamo Kyiv	18	14	3	1	47	9	+38	45	Qualification for the Champions League second qualifying round
3	Dnipro-1	18	13	1	4	35	17	+18	40	Qualification for the Europa League play-off round
4	Zorya Luhansk	18	11	3	4	37	19	+18	36	Qualification for the Europa Conference League third qualifying round
5	Vorskla Poltava	18	9	6	3	30	18	+12	33	Qualification for the Europa Conference League second qualifying round
6	Oleksandriya	18	7	5	6	19	16	+3	26	
7	Desna Chernihiv (Note: Desna Chernihiv and Mariupol confirmed that they cannot compete next season due to destroyed infrastructure and the difficult situation in their cities.)	18	7	4	7	22	27	−5	25	Membership suspended after season
8	Kolos Kovalivka	18	7	3	8	14	23	−9	24	
9	Veres Rivne	18	6	5	7	15	20	−5	23	
10	Metalist 1925 Kharkiv	18	6	1	11	17	29	−12	19	
11	Rukh Lviv	17	4	6	7	16	21	−5	18	
12	Lviv	18	4	5	9	14	30	−16	17	
13	Chornomorets Odesa	18	3	5	10	20	40	−20	14	
14	Inhulets Petrove	17	3	4	10	13	28	−15	13	
15	Mynai	18	1	7	10	12	30	−18	10	
16	Mariupol	18	2	2	14	21	44	−23	8	Membership suspended after season

Source: upl.ua
Rules for classification: 1) Points; 2) Head-to-head points; 3) Head-to-head goal difference; 4) Head-to-head higher number of goals scored; 5) Goal difference; 6) higher number of goals scored; 7) Draw or "Golden match" if two teams tied for title (Article 22, paragraph 3).

== Results ==
Teams play each other twice on a home and away basis.

Home \ Away	CHO	DES	DN1	DYN	INH	KOL	LVI	M25	MAR	MYN	OLK	RUX	SHA	VER	VOR	ZOR
Chornomorets Odesa		0–1	0–3	1–6	1–1		1–1	2–1			2–2	4–3	0–3	0–1		
Desna Chernihiv	3–0		2–1		2–0	0–1		1–2	3–3		1–1	1–0		0–4		
Dnipro-1	3–1					2–0			2–1	4–0	3–1	2–0		1–0	5–1	0–4
Dynamo Kyiv		4–0	2–0			7–0				2–0	1–0		0–0	4–0	1–2	1–1
Inhulets Petrove		2–1	0–1	1–1		0–2			3–0					0–0		1–5
Kolos Kovalivka	2–1						0–1	1–0	1–3	2–1	0–1	1–1	1–3	1–0	0–1	
Lviv		0–2	0–1	1–4	1–2			0–0	1–1		1–1		0–3		1–1	2–1
Metalist 1925 Kharkiv	3–2		1–2	0–2	4–0	0–1				1–0		2–1				1–6
Mariupol	2–3	1–2	0–3	2–3			0–1	1–2				0–2	0–5			3–4
Mynai	2–2	0–0		0–2	2–2	1–1	1–2		0–2		1–0		1–1			
Oleksandriya					1–0			2–0	2–1	3–0			1–2		1–2	0–1
Rukh Lviv				0–2			1–0	2–0		2–2	0–0			2–1	0–0	1–1
Shakhtar Donetsk		4–1	2–0	a	2–1		6–1	2–0			1–2	2–0		4–1		6–1
Veres Rivne				0–3		0–0	1–0	2–0	2–0	1–0	0–0	1–1			1–1	
Vorskla Poltava	0–0	2–2	2–2		3–0		4–1	2–0	5–1	2–0		2–0	0–2			
Zorya Luhansk	3–0	2–0		1–2	1–0	1–0				1–1	0–1			3–0	1–0	

Updated to match(es) played on 12 December 2021. Source: UPL calendar
Legend: Blue = home team win; Yellow = draw; Red = away team win.
For upcoming matches, an "a" indicates there is an article about the rivalry between the two participants.

== Season statistics ==
=== Top goalscorers ===
As of 12 December 2021

Rank	Scorer	Team	Goals (Pen.)
1	(Ukraine) Artem Dovbyk	Dnipro-1	14 (3)
2	(Ukraine) Viktor Tsyhankov	Dynamo Kyiv	11 (5)
3	(Ukraine) Vitaliy Buyalskyi	Dynamo Kyiv	9 (1)
3	(Brazil) Tetê	Shakhtar Donetsk	9 (1)
5	(Luxembourg) Olivier Thill	Vorskla Poltava	8 (2)
6	(Ukraine) Denys Bezborodko	Desna Chernihiv	7
6	(Ukraine) Denys Harmash	Dynamo Kyiv	7
8	(Ukraine) Andriy Kulakov	Mariupol	6
8	(Iran) Allahyar Sayyadmanesh	Zorya Luhansk	6
8	(Iran) Shahab Zahedi	Zorya Luhansk	6
8	(Ukraine) Ruslan Stepanyuk	Vorskla Poltava	6
8	(Burkina Faso) Lassina Traoré	Shakhtar Donetsk	6 (1)

=== Assists ===
As of 22 August 2021

Rank	Scorer	Team	Assists
1	(Ukraine) Vladyslav Kalitvintsev	Desna Chernihiv	5
2	(Luxembourg) Olivier Thill	Vorskla Poltava	4
2	(Ukraine) Yukhym Konoplya	Shakhtar Donetsk	4
2	(Ukraine) Oleksandr Sklyar	Vorskla Poltava	4
5	2 players		3

=== Clean sheets ===
As of 12 December 2021

Rank	Player	Club	Clean sheets
1	(Ukraine) Bohdan Kohut	Veres Rivne	9
2	(Ukraine) Heorhiy Bushchan	Dynamo Kyiv	8
2	(Ukraine) Dmytro Matsapura	Zorya Luhansk	8
4	(Ukraine) Oleh Bilyk	Oleksandriya	7
4	(Romania) Valentin Cojocaru	Dnipro-1	7
4	(Ukraine) Dmytro Riznyk	Vorskla Poltava	7
7	(Ukraine) Yuriy Pankiv	Rukh Lviv	5
7	(Ukraine) Anatoliy Trubin	Shakhtar Donetsk	5
7	(Ukraine) Yevhen Volynets	Kolos Kovalivka	5
10	(Ukraine) Ihor Lytovka	Desna Chernihiv	4
10	(Ukraine) Andriy Pyatov	Shakhtar Donetsk	4

=== Hat-tricks ===
Player	For	Against	Result	Date
(Ukraine) Vladyslav Kocherhin	Zorya Luhansk	Inhulets Petrove	5–1	2 August 2021
(Iran) Shahab Zahedi	Zorya Luhansk	Veres Rivne	3–0	7 November 2021

Away win
Home win
Draw

== Awards ==
=== Monthly awards ===
Month	Player of the Month		Coach of the Month		Ref.
Month	Player	Club	Coach	Club	Ref.
August 2021	(Ukraine) Artem Dovbyk	Dnipro-1	(Ukraine) Yuriy Virt	Veres Rivne	
September 2021	(Ukraine) Denys Harmash	Dynamo Kyiv	(Ukraine) Viktor Skrypnyk	Zorya Luhansk	
October 2021	(Ukraine) Denys Harmash	Dynamo Kyiv	(Ukraine) Yuriy Maksymov	Vorskla Poltava	
November 2021	(Ukraine) Artem Dovbyk	Dnipro-1	(Ukraine) Viktor Skrypnyk	Zorya Luhansk	

=== Round awards ===
Round	Player			Coach		
Round	Player	Club	Reference	Coach	Club	Reference
Round 1	(Ukraine) Artem Dovbyk	Dnipro-1		(Ukraine) Valeriy Kryventsov	Metalist 1925 Kharkiv	
Round 2	(Ukraine) Vladyslav Kocherhin	Zorya Luhansk		(Ukraine) Viktor Skrypnyk	Zorya Luhansk	
Round 3	(Ukraine) Denys Bezborodko	Desna Chernihiv		(Ukraine) Yuriy Hura	Oleksandriya	
Round 4	(Ukraine) Bohdan Shust	Inhulets Petrove		(Ukraine) Yuriy Moroz	Chornomorets Odesa	
Round 5	(Ukraine) Vitaliy Buyalskyi	Dynamo Kyiv		(Romania) Mircea Lucescu	Dynamo Kyiv	
Round 6	(Ukraine) Mykhaylo Serhiychuk	Veres Rivne		(Ukraine) Yuriy Virt	Veres Rivne	
Round 7	(Ukraine) Oleh Vyshnevskyi	Mynai		(Ukraine) Ostap Markevych	Mariupol	
Round 8	(Ukraine) Oleh Bilyk	Oleksandriya		(Ukraine) Viktor Skrypnyk	Zorya Luhansk	
Round 9	(Ukraine) Vladyslav Kocherhin	Zorya Luhansk		(Ukraine) Viktor Skrypnyk	Zorya Luhansk	
Round 10	(Luxembourg) Olivier Thill	Vorskla Poltava		(Romania) Mircea Lucescu	Dynamo Kyiv	
Round 11	(Brazil) Lucas Rangel	Vorskla Poltava		(Italy) Roberto De Zerbi	Shakhtar Donetsk	
Round 12	(Ukraine) Dmytro Kryskiv	Metalist 1925 Kharkiv		(Ukraine) Valeriy Kryventsov	Metalist 1925 Kharkiv	
Round 13	(Ukraine) Serhiy Sydorchuk	Dynamo Kyiv		(Ukraine) Viktor Skrypnyk	Zorya Luhansk	
Round 14	(Iran) Shahab Zahedi	Zorya Luhansk		(Ukraine) Yuriy Maksymov	Vorskla Poltava	
Round 15	(Ukraine) Artem Dovbyk	Dnipro-1		(Belarus) Oleg Dulub	Lviv	
Round 16	(Ukraine) Artem Dovbyk	Dnipro-1		(Croatia) Igor Jovićević	Dnipro-1	
Round 17	(Slovenia) Benjamin Verbič	Dynamo Kyiv		(Ukraine) Yaroslav Vyshnyak	Kolos Kovalivka	
Round 18	(Iran) Allahyar Sayyadmanesh	Zorya Luhansk		(Ukraine) Yuriy Moroz	Chornomorets Odesa	
winter break
Round 19						
Round 20						
Round 21						
Round 22						
Round 23						
Round 24						
Round 25						
Round 26						
Round 27						
Round 28						
Round 29						
Round 30						

== Abandonment ==
The second half of the season was expected to start on 25 February with the 19th matchday game Mynai vs Zorya Luhansk. However, on 24 February 2022, Russia invaded Ukraine, and the Ukrainian government, led by President Volodymyr Zelenskyy, declared martial law nationwide. As a consequence, the league was immediately suspended.

This season was abandoned on 26 April 2022. At the UPL extraordinary general meeting, the league decided that the season would be prematurely finished, and that it would not award a championship title for the season, but the league standings at the time would be used to determine qualification to UEFA competitions.

The meeting was also attended by a number of the Ukrainian Association of Football (UAF) officials, among which was the first vice-president Oleh Protasov. The UPL general meeting decision was submitted to UAF Executive Committee for approval. On 2 May 2022, the UAF Executive Committee confirmed the premature finish to the seadon. A further EGM was held on May 27 to decide promotion and relegation. This confirmed that Desna Chernihiv and Mariupol had both withdrawn from the league for the following campaign due to the damage and destruction in their respective cities and facilities because of the war. Metalist Kharkiv and Kryvbas Kryvyi Rih, who were the top two teams in the First League at the time of abandonment, were selected to be promoted by UAF.

== See also ==
- 2021–22 Ukrainian First League
- 2021–22 Ukrainian Second League
- 2021–22 Ukrainian Football Amateur League
- 2021–22 Ukrainian Women's League
- 2021–22 Ukrainian Cup
- Global Tour for Peace
- List of Ukrainian football transfers summer 2021
