= Viktor Lykhovydko =

Association football player

Personal information
- Full name: Viktor Yuriyovych Lykhovydko
- Date of birth: 13 April 1992 (age 34)
- Place of birth: Bila Tserkva, Ukraine
- Height: 1.84 m (6 ft 0 in)
- Positions: Defender; midfielder

Team information
- Current team: Concordia Elbląg

Senior career*
Years	Team	Apps	(Gls)
2009–2011	Arsenal Bila Tserkva	3	(0)
2011	Yednist Plysky	7	(1)
2012	Regar-TadAZ Tursunzoda	4	(2)
2013–2014	Arsenal-Kyivshchyna Bila Tserkva	16	(0)
2016	Veres Rivne	10	(0)
2017–2018	Sumy	38	(2)
2019	Hirnyk-Sport Horishni Plavni	27	(2)
2020–2021	Chornomorets Odesa	33	(7)
2021–2022	Mynai	7	(0)
2022	→ Narew Ostrołęka (loan)	6	(0)
2022–2023	Górnik Łęczna	24	(1)
2023–2024	Cosmos Nowotaniec	18	(3)
2024–2026	Narew Ostrołęka	51	(26)
2026–	Concordia Elbląg	0	(0)
- * Club domestic league appearances and goals as of 10:27, 31 July 2026 (UTC)

Viktor Yuriyovych Lykhovydko (Ukrainian: Віктор Юрійович Лиховидько; born 13 April 1992) is a Ukrainian professional footballer who plays as a defender or midfielder for Polish IV liga Warmia-Masuria club Concordia Elbląg.

== Career ==
Lykhovydko started his senior career with Arsenal Bila Tserkva. After that he played for Yednist Plysky, Regar-TadAZ Tursunzoda, Veres Rivne, and Sumy. In 2019 he signed for Hirnyk-Sport Horishni Plavni in the Ukrainian First League, where he made twenty-nine appearances and scored three goals.

On 20 May 2022, he joined Polish fifth division side Narew Ostrołęka on a short-term loan. Shortly after, on 30 June, he signed a one-year contract with an extension option with I liga club Górnik Łęczna.

On 29 September 2023, Lykhovydko returned to the fifth division and signed with Cosmos Nowotaniec.

On 8 July 2024, he re-joined Narew Ostrołęka on a permanent basis.

On 30 July 2026, IV liga side Concordia Elbląg announced the signing of Lykhovydko for the 2026–27 season.
