= Serhiy Solovyov =

Ukrainian footballer and coach

Serhiy Solovyov Сергій Соловйов
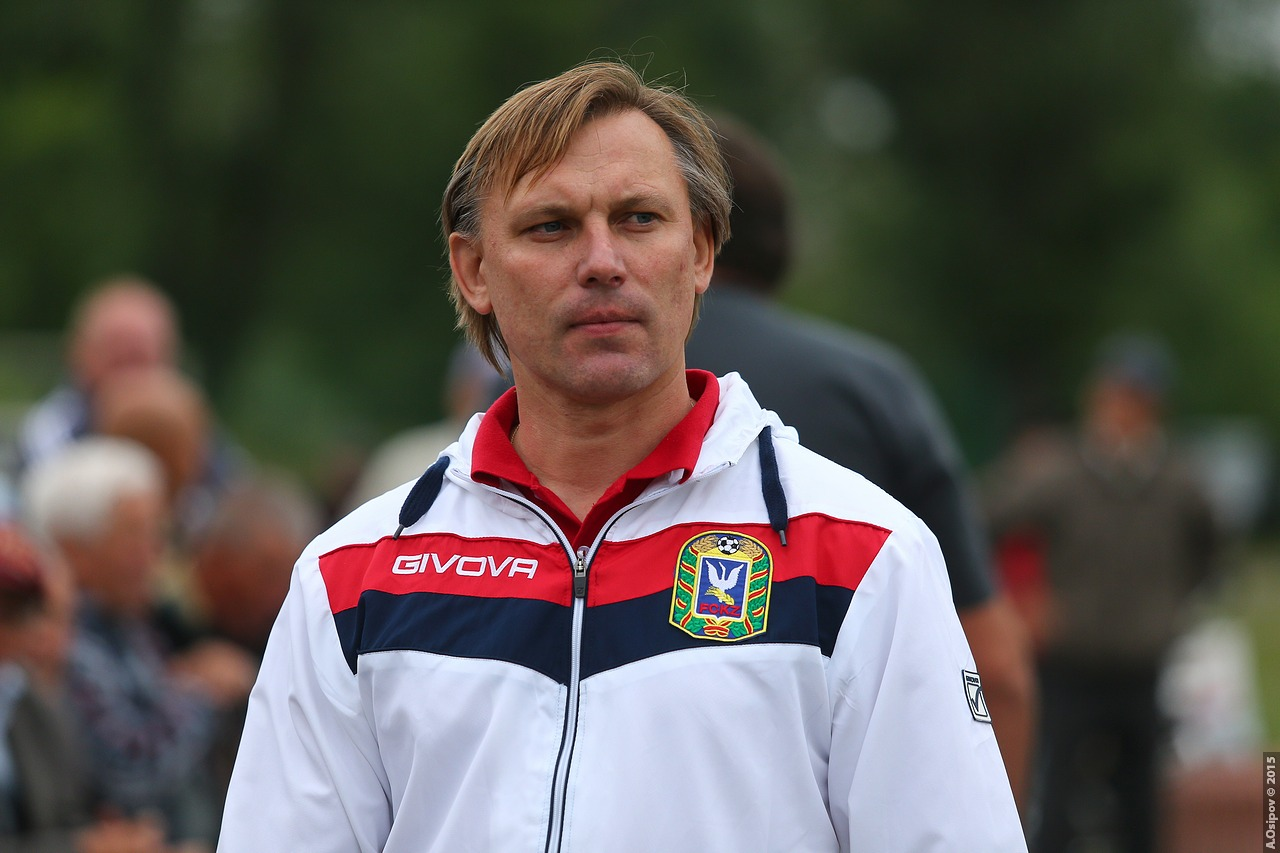
- as a head coach of Kolos Zachepylivka

Personal information
- Full name: Serhiy Mykolayovych Solovyov
- Date of birth: 7 March 1971 (age 55)
- Place of birth: Dnipropetrovsk, Ukrainian SSR
- Height: 1.80 m (5 ft 11 in)
- Position: Defender

Team information
- Current team: FC Peremoha Dnipro (sports director)

Youth career
- -1988: Sports school of Olympic reserve Dnipro-75
- 1988: Dnipropetrovsk regional boarding school of sports profile

Senior career*
Years	Team	Apps	(Gls)
1988–1991	Dnipro Dnipropetrovsk	0	(0)
1991–1994	Kryvbas Kryvyi Rih	34	(0)
1991–1992	→ Temp Shepetivka (loan)	28	(0)
1994–1995	Vodnyk Kherson	20	(0)
1994	→ SC Mykolaiv	1	(0)
1996–1997	Sokol-PZD Saratov	54	(1)
1998	Samotlor-XXI Nizhnevartovsk	4	(0)
1999–2000	MFC Mykolaiv	40	(1)
2000	Regar-TadAZ Tursunzoda		
2001	Bnei Sakhnin F.C.	?	(1)
2001	Orion Dnipropetrovsk	1	(0)

Managerial career
- 2006–2007: Stal Dniprodzerzhynsk (assistant)
- 2008–2012: Kryvbas Kryvyi Rih (reserves)
- 2012–2014: UVD Dnipropetrovsk
- 2015–2016: Kolos Zachepylivka
- 2017–2021: VPK-Ahro Shevchenkivka
- 2021–: Peremoha Dnipro (sporting director)
- * Club domestic league appearances and goals

Serhiy Solovyov (Ukrainian: Сергій Миколайович Соловйов; born 7 March 1971) is a Ukrainian football coach and a former defender. Since July 2021 he serves as a sports director at the Ukrainian club FC Peremoha Dnipro.

Serhiy Solovyov is a product of couple of sports schools associated with FC Dnipro and his first coach was Igor Vetrogonov. Solovyov never played for the first team of FC Dnipro competing only for reserves and in 1991 left it. After he played mostly for several second-tier clubs in Ukraine and Russia.

Sometime after 2001 Solovyov ended playing career and at least since 2006 was coaching. In 2008 to 2012 he led Kryvbas reserves in the UPL reserve competitions. Later he coached several amateur clubs. In 2019 it was a real breakthrough when coaching VPK-Ahro from small town of Mahdalynivka he became a head coach of the Second League group champions gaining promotion to the First League.
