= Ihor Bilan =

Ukrainian footballer and coach (born 1973)

Personal information
- Date of birth: 29 July 1973 (age 53)
- Place of birth: Ulychne, Drohobych Raion, Ukrainian SSR, Soviet Union
- Height: 1.81 m (5 ft 11 1/2 in)
- Position: Goalkeeper

Senior career*
Years	Team	Apps	(Gls)
1992–1996	Halychyna Drohobych	71	(0)
1997–2002	Cherkasy	142	(0)
2000	→ Cherkasy-2	1	(0)
2002	Kameniar-Termoplast Drohobych	5	(1)
2003	Zakarpattia Uzhhorod	17	(0)
2004	Mykolaiv	20	(0)
2005	Spartak Ivano-Frankivsk	9	(0)
2006	Ihroservice Simferopol	23	(0)
2007	Lviv	7	(0)
2007	Arsenal Bila Tserkva	14	(0)
2010	Halychyna Drohobych	5	(0)
2012	Mykolaiv	13	(0)
2013–2014	Stal Dniprodzerzhynsk	0	(0)

Managerial career
- 2013–2018: Stal Kamianske (goalie coach)
- 2018: Kalush (goalie coach)
- 2019–2020: Nyva Ternopil (goalie coach)
- 2020: Nyva Ternopil (interim)
- 2020–2021: Nyva Ternopil
- * Club domestic league appearances and goals

Ihor Ihorovych Bilan (Ukrainian: Ігор Ігорович Білан; born 29 July 1973) is a Ukrainian professional football coach and a former player.

In winter of 2019 Bilan began working as goalkeeper coach in Nyva Ternopil in a coaching staff of Vasyl Malyk. At the end of 2020 he was placed at the helm of the senior squad. On 12 April 2021 Bilan was let go.
