= Serhiy Shevtsov =

Ukrainian footballer and coach

Personal information
- Date of birth: 31 December 1975 (age 50)
- Place of birth: Kherson, Ukrainian SSR, Soviet Union
- Height: 1.76 m (5 ft 9 1/2 in)
- Position: Forward

Senior career*
Years	Team	Apps	(Gls)
1992	Krystal Kherson	9	(0)
1992–1993	Meliorator Kakhovka	23	(0)
1993–1994	Tavria Kherson	4	(0)
1993–1994	→ Enerhia Kherson (loan)	7	(0)
1994–1995	Torpedo Arzamas	32	(4)
1995	→ Druzhba Arzamas	?	(1)
1996–1997	Olimpia Zambrów	4	(0)
1997–1999	Krystal Kherson	35	(29)
1999–2001	Dnipro Dnipropetrovsk	29	(3)
1999–2000	→ Dnipro-2 Dnipropetrovsk (loan)	14	(4)
2000	→ Dnipro-3 Dnipropetrovsk (loan)	2	(3)
2001	→ Dyskobolia Grodzisk (loan)	1	(0)
2001	KZEZO Kakhovka		
2001–2004	Vorskla Poltava	77	(15)
2001–2002	→ Vorskla-2 Poltava (loan)	10	(2)
2004	Tavriya Simferopol	4	(0)
2005	→ Zakarpattia Uzhhorod (loan)	10	(4)
2006	KhEPI Kherson		
2006	Hopry Hola Prystan		
2006–2007	Dynamo Tsiurupinsk		
2007	→ Sihma Kherson (loan)	3	(2)
2011	FC Kherson		

Managerial career
- 2008–2012: Enerhiya Nova Kakhovka
- 2012: Krymteplytsia Molodizhne
- 2013–2016: Krystal Kherson
- 2018–2019: Krystal Kherson
- 2020–2021: Krystal Kherson (interim)
- * Club domestic league appearances and goals

Serhiy Shevtsov (Ukrainian: Сергій Анатолійович Шевцов; born 31 December 1975) is a Ukrainian professional football manager and former player.

== Personal life ==
His son Illya Shevtsov is also a footballer. In 2022, he joined USL League One club Charlotte Independence on loan, becoming the first Ukrainian player to move to the United States.
