= Artem Kovbasa =

Ukrainian footballer

Personal information
- Full name: Artem Petrovych Kovbasa
- Date of birth: 19 January 1997 (age 29)
- Place of birth: Kyiv, Ukraine
- Height: 1.78 m (5 ft 10 in)
- Position: Attacking midfielder

Team information
- Current team: Varnsdorf
- Number: 24

Youth career
- 2010–2012: Arsenal Kyiv
- 2012–2014: Dynamo Kyiv

Senior career*
Years	Team	Apps	(Gls)
2014–2016	Dynamo Kyiv	0	(0)
2015–2016	→ Dynamo-2 Kyiv	10	(1)
2016–2020	Obolon Kyiv	67	(8)
2016	→ Obolon-2 Bucha (amateurs)	1	(0)
2020–2021	Chornomorets Odesa	24	(5)
2021	Olimpik Donetsk	13	(0)
2022–2023	Karlovac 1919	1	(0)
2023–2024	Sūduva	13	(2)
2025	Tauras		
2025	Elana Toruń	0	(0)
2025–	Varnsdorf	24	(2)
- * Club domestic league appearances and goals as of 20:00, 2 July 2026 (UTC)

Artem Petrovych Kovbasa (Ukrainian: Артем Петрович Ковбаса; born 19 January 1997) is a Ukrainian professional footballer who plays as an attacking midfielder for Czech club Varnsdorf.

== Career ==
Kovbasa is a product of two different Kievan youth football school systems – Arsenal Kyiv and Dynamo Kyiv. At the age of 15, he moved to Dynamo, where he studied until 2014. He made his debut in the youth championship (U-19) on 26 March 2014 in a match against Dnipro in a 2–0 loss, which became the only one for him that season. In the following 2014–15 season, he played in 18 matches of the youth championship, in which he scored four goals.

In the summer of 2015, along with a number of other players, he was registered to play for Dynamo-2 in the Ukrainian First League. He made his senior debut on 27 July 2015 in the 2–1 first round win against Ternopil in a 2–1 win, coming on as a substitute in the 75th minute, replacing Ivan Trubochkin.

In July 2016, Kovbasa signed for Oblon Kyiv. In September 2020, he joined Chornomorets Odesa.

On 1 July 2023, Kovbasa signed with Lithuanian club Sūduva Club.

On 14 February 2025, Kovbasa moved to I Lyga side Tauras Club.
