= Valeriy Ivashchenko (footballer) =

Ukrainian footballer and coach

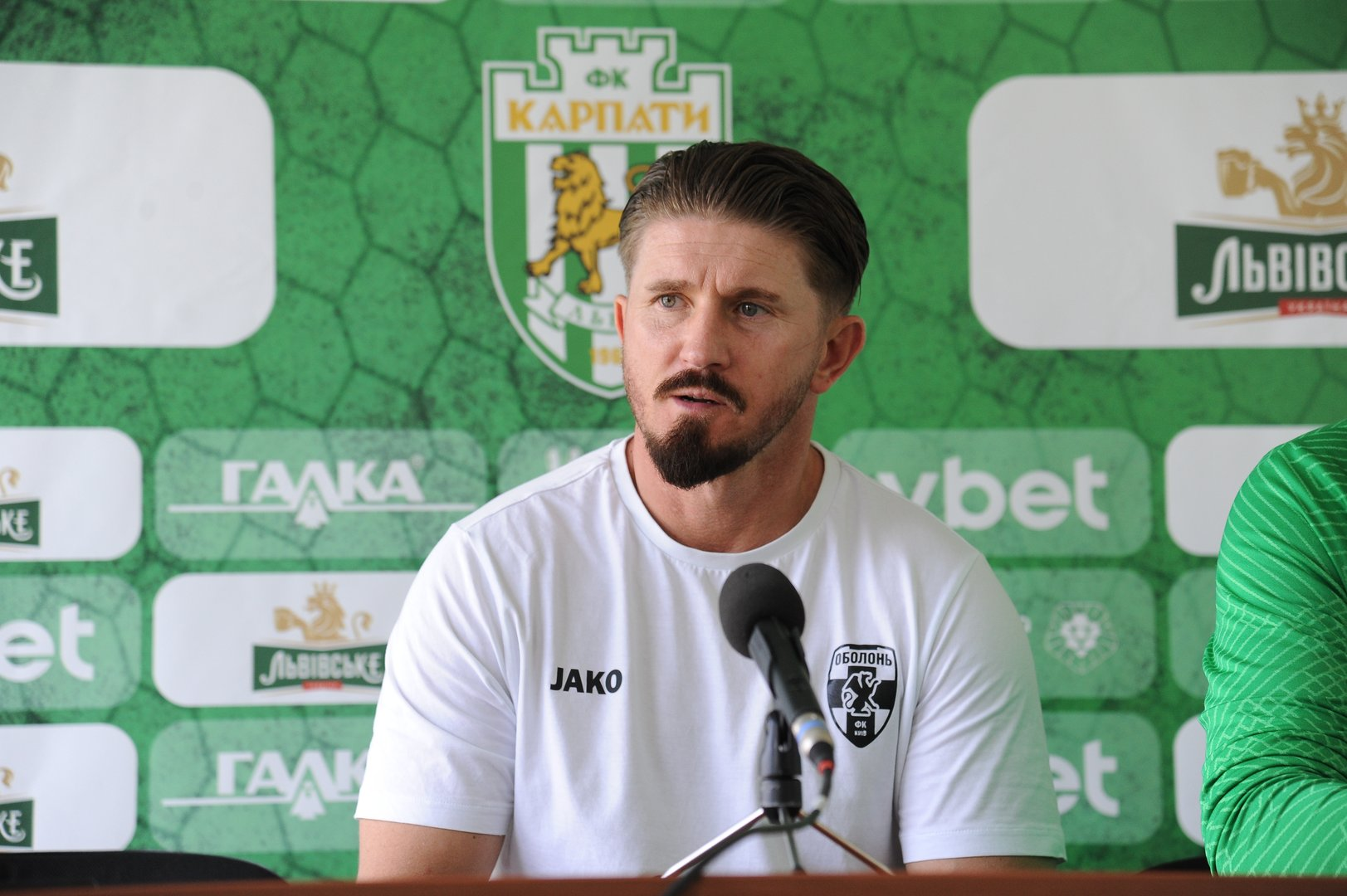
- at a press conference in 2023

Personal information
- Full name: Valeriy Volodymyrovych Ivashchenko
- Date of birth: 25 November 1980 (age 45)
- Place of birth: Kyiv, Ukrainian SSR
- Height: 1.80 m (5 ft 11 in)
- Position: Midfielder

Team information
- Current team: Dnister Zalishchyky

Senior career*
Years	Team	Apps	(Gls)
1998–2003	Metalurh Zaporizhzhia	25	(0)
1998–2003	Metalurh-2 Zaporizhzhia	57	(10)
2004	Spartak Ivano-Frankivsk	1	(0)
2004	Spartak-2 Kalush	2	(0)
2004–2008	Obolon Kyiv	104	(27)
2008–2009	Naftovyk-Ukrnafta Okhtyrka	33	(7)
2010–2011	Oleksandriya	37	(6)
2011–2013	Obolon Kyiv	1	(0)
2012	→ Obolon-2 Kyiv	9	(1)
2013	Obolon-Brovar Kyiv	3	(0)
Total		272	(51)

Managerial career
- 2014–2017: Obolon-Brovar-2 Kyiv
- 2017–2018: Obolon-Brovar Kyiv (caretaker)
- 2018–2020: Obolon-Brovar Kyiv (assistant)
- 2020: Obolon-Brovar Kyiv (caretaker)
- 2020–2021: Obolon Kyiv (assistant)
- 2021: Obolon Kyiv (caretaker)
- 2021–2024: Obolon Kyiv
- 2025: Mriya Hostomel
- 2026: Nyva Ternopil (assistant)
- 2026–: Dnister Zalishchyky
- * Club domestic league appearances and goals

Valeriy Volodymyrovych Ivashchenko (Ukrainian: Валерій Володимирович Іващенко; born 25 November 1980) is a Ukrainian former football midfielder and current manager.

== Personal life ==
Valeriy Ivashchenko is an older brother of another Ukrainian footballer Oleksandr Ivashchenko.
