= Oleksiy Horodov =

Ukrainian footballer (born 1978)

Personal information
- Full name: Oleksiy Horodov
- Date of birth: 28 August 1978 (age 48)
- Place of birth: Sievierodonetsk, Soviet Union (now Ukraine)
- Height: 1.74 m (5 ft 8 1/2 in)
- Position: Midfielder

Senior career*
Years	Team	Apps	(Gls)
1995–1996	Khimik Sieverodonetsk	26	(2)
1997	Zorya Luhansk	11	(0)
1997–1999	CSKA Kyiv	16	(2)
1997–1999	→ CSKA-2 Kyiv	52	(5)
2000–2001	Prykarpattia Ivano-Frankivsk	48	(3)
2002	Molniya Sieverodonetsk	7	(0)
2002–2003	Oleksandriya	21	(1)
2003–2004	Illichivets Mariupol	18	(1)
2004	→ Illichivets-2 Mariupol	1	(0)
2004	Borysfen Boryspil	8	(0)
2005	Nyva Vinnytsia	15	(2)
2005–2006	Zorya Luhansk	47	(10)
2007–2008	Kharkiv	42	(0)
2009	CSKA Kyiv	8	(0)
2009	Zorya Luhansk	12	(0)
2010	Zirka Kirovohrad	31	(2)
2011	Poltava	17	(1)
2012–2016	Khimik Sieverodonetsk		
2017	Zorya Rubizhne		
Total		380	(29)

Managerial career
- 2012: Khimik Severodonetsk (assistant)
- 2013–2016: Khimik Severodonetsk
- 2017: Zoria Rubizhne
- 2018–2020: Avanhard Kramatorsk (u-19)
- 2020–2022: Kramatorsk
- * Club domestic league appearances and goals

Oleksiy Horodov (born 28 August 1978, in Ukraine) is a retired Ukrainian football midfielder and current football manager.
