= List of Ukrainian football transfers summer 2022 =

This is a list of Ukrainian football transfers summer 2022.

== Ukrainian Premier League ==
=== Chornomorets Odesa ===
In:

No.	Pos.	Nation	Player
—	GK	KAZ	Dmytro Nepohodov (from (Kazakhstan) FC Tobol)
—	DF	SWE	Doug Bergqvist (loan return from (Sweden) Kalmar FF)
—	DF	CAN	Manjrekar James (from (Denmark) Vejle)
—	DF	MNE	Ilija Martinović (loan return from (Montenegro) Dečić)
—	DF	UKR	Volodymyr Salyuk (from Balkany Zorya)
—	DF	UKR	Yevhen Selin (from Desna Chernihiv)
—	DF	UKR	Serhiy Sukhanov (from Obolon Kyiv)
—	DF	UKR	Maksym Voytikhovskyi (from Volyn Lutsk)
—	DF	UKR	Vitaliy Yermakov (from Metalist 1925 Kharkiv)
—	MF	UKR	Illya Hadzhuk (from Dynamo Kyiv)
—	MF	UKR	Ivan Lytvynenko (from Rukh Lviv)
—	MF	UKR	Vladyslav Naumets (from Mynai)
—	MF	UKR	Rodion Plaksa (from FC Mariupol)
—	MF	BUL	Borislav Tsonev (loan return from (Bulgaria) Slavia Sofia)
—	MF	GEO	Beka Vachiberadze (loan return from (Georgia (country)) Torpedo Kutaisi)
—	MF	BRA	Wanderson Maranhão (loan return from (Lithuania) Panevėžys)
—	MF	UKR	Serhiy Petko (from Veres Rivne)
—	MF	UKR	Serhiy Politylo (from Lviv)
—	MF	SLO	Rudi Požeg Vancaš (loan return from (Kazakhstan) FC Tobol)
—	FW	UKR	Maksym Yermolenko (from FC Kramatorsk)

Out:

No.	Pos.	Nation	Player
—	DF	SWE	Doug Bergqvist (to (Latvia) Riga)
—	DF	UKR	Kristian Bilovar (loan return to Dynamo Kyiv)
—	DF	CAN	Manjrekar James (loan return to (Denmark) Vejle)
—	DF	MNE	Ilija Martinović (to (Uzbekistan) Pakhtakor Tashkent)
—	DF	UKR	Yevhen Martynenko
—	DF	UKR	Artem Sukhotskyi
—	MF	UKR	Mykola Mykhaylenko (loan return to Dynamo Kyiv)
—	MF	BUL	Borislav Tsonev
—	MF	GEO	Beka Vachiberadze (to (Georgia (country)) Torpedo Kutaisi)
—	MF	SLO	Rudi Požeg Vancaš
—	FW	UKR	Nazariy Rusyn (loan return to Dynamo Kyiv)

=== Dnipro-1 ===
In:

No.	Pos.	Nation	Player
—	GK	ROU	Valentin Cojocaru (loan return from (Netherlands) Feyenoord)
—	GK	UKR	Bohdan Khoma (loan return from Nikopol)
—	GK	UKR	Vladyslav Rybak (on loan from Metalist Kharkiv)
—	GK	UKR	Bohdan Sarnavskyi (loan return from (Israel) Hapoel Tel Aviv)
—	GK	BRA	Max Walef (from (Brazil) Fortaleza)
—	DF	BRA	Gabriel Busanello (on loan from (Brazil) Chapecoense)
—	DF	UKR	Serhiy Chobotenko (from FC Mariupol)
—	DF	UKR	Taras Horilyi (loan return from Nikopol)
—	DF	UKR	Oleksiy Khyzhnyak (loan return from Nikopol)
—	DF	POR	Nélson Monte (loan return from (Spain) Almería)
—	DF	UKR	Denys Shvydenko (loan return from Nikopol)
—	DF	UKR	Denys Soroka (loan return from Nikopol)
—	DF	UKR	Roman Vantukh (loan return from SC Dnipro-1)
—	DF	UKR	Serhiy Zayets (loan return from Nikopol)
—	MF	UKR	Ruslan Babenko (from Metalist Kharkiv)
—	MF	UKR	Arseniy Batahov (loan return from Polissya Zhytomyr)
—	MF	UKR	Oleksandr Byelyayev (loan return from (Turkey) Gençlerbirliği)
—	MF	ARG	Francisco Di Franco (loan return from (Argentina) Atlético Tucumán)
—	MF	UKR	Serhiy Horbunov (from Metalist Kharkiv)
—	MF	UKR	Artem Hromov (from Zorya Luhansk)
—	MF	UKR	Andriy Kireyev (loan return from Nikopol)
—	MF	UKR	Valentyn Rubchynskyi (loan return from Nikopol)
—	MF	UKR	Eduard Sarapiy (on loan from Metalist Kharkiv)
—	MF	UKR	Vladyslav Shynkarenko (loan return from Nikopol)
—	MF	UKR	Maksym Solovyov (loan return from Nikopol)
—	MF	UKR	Volodymyr Tanchyk (from Metalist Kharkiv)
—	MF	UKR	Maksym Tyapkin (loan return from Nikopol)
—	MF	UKR	Artem Hromov (from Zorya Luhansk)
—	MF	ARG	Domingo Blanco (from (Argentina) Independiente)
—	MF	ARG	Emiliano Purita (from (Greece) Volos)
—	FW	BRA	Bill (loan return from (Brazil) Sport Recife)
—	FW	UKR	Bohdan Hora (loan return from Nikopol)
—	FW	BRA	Felipe Pires (loan return from (Netherlands) ADO Den Haag)

Out:

No.	Pos.	Nation	Player
—	GK	UKR	Bohdan Khoma (to Kryvbas Kryvyi Rih)
—	GK	UKR	Bohdan Sarnavskyi (to Kryvbas Kryvyi Rih)
—	GK	ROU	Valentin Cojocaru (to (Belgium) OH Leuven)
—	GK	UKR	Bohdan Khoma (to Kryvbas Kryvyi Rih)
—	DF	UKR	Serhiy Chobotenko
—	DF	UKR	Mykyta Kravchenko (loan return to Dynamo Kyiv)
—	DF	POR	Nélson Monte (on loan to (Portugal) Chaves)
—	DF	UKR	Roman Vantukh (loan return to Dynamo Kyiv)
—	MF	UKR	Arseniy Batahov (to Zorya Luhansk)
—	MF	UKR	Yehor Yarmolyuk (to (England) Brentford)
—	FW	BRA	Bill (on loan to (Latvia) RFS)
—	FW	BRA	Felipe Pires (on loan to (Brazil) Juventude)

=== Dynamo Kyiv ===
In:

No.	Pos.	Nation	Player
—	DF	UKR	Alan Aussi (loan return from Veres Rivne)
—	DF	UKR	Kristian Bilovar (loan return from Chornomorets Odesa)
—	DF	POL	Tomasz Kędziora (loan return from (Poland) Lech Poznań)
—	DF	BLR	Artem Khatskevich (loan return from Desna Chernihiv)
—	DF	UKR	Mykyta Kravchenko (loan return from SC Dnipro-1)
—	DF	BRA	Sidcley (loan return from (Greece) PAOK)
—	DF	UKR	Roman Vantukh (loan return from SC Dnipro-1)
—	MF	NGR	Benito (loan return from (Croatia) HNK Gorica)
—	MF	LTU	Titas Buzas (loan return from (Lithuania) FK Jonava)
—	MF	GHA	Mohammed Kadiri (loan return from (Hungary) Budapest Honvéd)
—	MF	UKR	Mykola Mykhaylenko (loan return from Chornomorets Odesa)
—	MF	UKR	Roman Mykhayliv (loan return from FC Lviv)
—	MF	LUX	Gerson Rodrigues (loan return from (Turkey) Eyüpspor)
—	MF	GEO	Heorhiy Tsitaishvili (loan return from (Poland) Wisła Kraków)
—	MF	SLO	Benjamin Verbič (loan return from (Poland) Legia Warsaw)
—	MF	UKR	Artur Vashchyshyn (loan return from Podillya Khmelnytskyi)
—	MF	UKR	Vikentiy Voloshyn (loan return from Desna Chernihiv)
—	FW	BEL	Ibrahim Kargbo Jr. (loan return from (Slovenia) Celje)
—	FW	VEN	Eric Ramírez (loan return from (Spain) Sporting Gijón)
—	FW	UKR	Nazariy Rusyn (loan return from Chornomorets Odesa)
—	FW	ESP	Fran Sol (loan return from (Spain) Eibar)
—	FW	UKR	Vladyslav Supryaha (loan return from (Italy) Sampdoria)
—	FW	BRA	Vitinho (loan return from (Brazil) Athletico Paranaense)

Out:

No.	Pos.	Nation	Player
—	DF	BLR	Artem Khatskevich (loan to (Czech Republic) Spoje Prague)
—	DF	UKR	Maksym Dyachuk (on loan to FC Oleksandriya)
—	DF	UKR	Roman Vantukh (on loan to Zorya Luhansk)
—	DF	UKR	Alan Aussi (to (Armenia) Pyunik)
—	DF	BRA	Sidcley (to (Brazil) Cuiabá)
—	DF	UKR	Kristian Bilovar (loan to (Cyprus) AEL Limassol)
—	MF	UKR	Viktor Bliznichenko (to Inhulets Petrove)
—	MF	UKR	Volodymyr Brazhko (on loan to Zorya Luhansk)
—	MF	LTU	Titas Buzas (to (Germany) FC Augsburg)
—	MF	UKR	Illya Hadzhuk (to Chornomorets Odesa)
—	MF	LUX	Gerson Rodrigues (on loan to (Saudi Arabia) Al Wehda)
—	MF	UKR	Mykola Mykhaylenko (on loan to Zorya Luhansk)
—	MF	UKR	Artem Shulyanskyi (to FC Oleksandriya)
—	MF	UKR	Yevhen Smyrnyi (on loan to Kolos Kovalivka)
—	MF	GEO	Heorhiy Tsitaishvili (on loan to (Poland) Lech Poznań)
—	MF	SLO	Benjamin Verbič (to (Greece) Panathinaikos)
—	MF	UKR	Nazar Voloshyn (on loan to Kryvbas Kryvyi Rih (2020))
—	MF	UKR	Vikentiy Voloshyn (on loan to FC Oleksandriya)
—	FW	BEL	Ibrahim Kargbo Jr. (on loan to (Cyprus) Doxa Katokopias)
—	FW	UKR	Kiril Popov (on loan to Kolos Kovalivka)
—	FW	VEN	Eric Ramírez (on loan to (Slovakia) Slovan Bratislava)
—	FW	UKR	Nazariy Rusyn (to Zorya Luhansk)
—	FW	ESP	Fran Sol (on loan to (Spain) Málaga)

=== Inhulets Petrove ===
In:

No.	Pos.	Nation	Player
—	GK	UKR	Oleksiy Palamarchuk (from Hirnyk-Sport Horishni Plavni)
—	DF	UKR	Serhiy Chenbay (from Metalist 1925 Kharkiv)
—	DF	UKR	Vladyslav Sydorenko (from Prykarpattia Ivano-Frankivsk)
—	DF	BRA	William (loan return from (Belarus) Dinamo Minsk)
—	MF	NED	Rodney Antwi (loan return from (Norway) Jerv)
—	MF	UKR	Viktor Bliznichenko (from Dynamo Kyiv)
—	MF	MDA	Dmitri Mandrîcenco (loan return from (Poland) Motor Lublin)
—	MF	AZE	Dmitri Naghiyev (from (Azerbaijan) Sumgayit)
—	MF	UKR	Volodymyr Odaryuk (from Oleksandriya)
—	MF	UKR	Denys Rezepov (from Metalist 1925 Kharkiv)
—	MF	UKR	Suleyman Seytkhalilov (loan return from Kremin Kremenchuk)
—	MF	UKR	Maksym Marusych (from (Lithuania) Riteriai)

Out:

No.	Pos.	Nation	Player
—	GK	UKR	Andriy Klishchuk (to Kryvbas Kryvyi Rih)
—	DF	UKR	Pavlo Polehenko (to Lviv)
—	DF	UKR	Maksym Melnychuk (loan return to Vorskla Poltava)
—	DF	UKR	Yevhen Opanasenko (to Kryvbas Kryvyi Rih)
—	MF	UKR	Mykhaylo Shyshka (to Lviv)

=== Kolos Kovalivka ===
In:

No.	Pos.	Nation	Player
—	GK	UKR	Yevhen Kucherenko (loan return from (Kazakhstan) Aksu)
—	DF	UKR	Roman Honcharenko (from Veres Rivne)
—	DF	UKR	Yevhen Kostyuk (loan return from Nyva Vinnytsia)
—	DF	UKR	Andriy Marchuk (loan return from Lyubomyr Stavyshche)
—	DF	UKR	Kyrylo Petrov (loan return from (Poland) Korona Kielce)
—	DF	UKR	Vladyslav Yemets (from Zorya Luhansk)
—	DF	BLR	Nikolay Zolotov (loan return from (France) Bastia)
—	DF	UKR	Oleksiy Zozulya (loan return from Lviv)
—	MF	UKR	Serhiy Bolbat (from Shakhtar Donetsk)
—	MF	BRA	Diego Carioca (loan return from (Poland) Jagiellonia Białystok)
—	MF	UKR	Vyacheslav Churko (loan return from (Hungary) Mezőkövesd)
—	MF	UKR	Arsentiy Doroshenko (loan return from Kramatorsk)
—	MF	UKR	Bohdan Dukhota (loan return from Dinaz Vyshhorod)
—	MF	UKR	Stanislav Morarenko (loan return from Podillya)
—	MF	UKR	Yevhen Morozko (loan return from Polissya Zhytomyr)
—	MF	UKR	Yevhen Smyrnyi (on loan from Dynamo Kyiv)
—	MF	UKR	Andriy Solovyov (loan return from Chaika)
—	FW	AZE	Anatoliy Nuriyev (loan return (Azerbaijan) Sumgayit)
—	FW	GEO	Nika Sichinava (loan return from (Finland) KuPS)
—	FW	UKR	Kiril Popov (on loan from Dynamo Kyiv)

Out:

No.	Pos.	Nation	Player
—	DF	UKR	Kyrylo Petrov (to (Poland) Korona Kielce)
—	DF	SLO	Matija Rom (to (Croatia) HNK Šibenik)
—	MF	BRA	Diego Carioca (on loan to (Hungary) Zalaegerszeg)
—	MF	UKR	Vyacheslav Churko (to Zorya Luhansk)
—	MF	UKR	Yevhen Morozko (to Polissya Zhytomyr)
—	MF	UKR	Andriy Totovytskyi (to Shakhtar Donetsk)
—	FW	AZE	Anatoliy Nuriyev (to (Azerbaijan) Sabah)

=== Kryvbas Kryvyi Rih ===
In:

No.	Pos.	Nation	Player
—	GK	UKR	Andriy Klishchuk (from Inhulets Petrove)
—	GK	UKR	Bohdan Sarnavskyi (from Dnipro-1)
—	GK	UKR	Bohdan Khoma (from Dnipro-1)
—	DF	UKR	Andriy Mostovyi (loan return from (Georgia (country)) Shevardeni-1906)
—	DF	UKR	Tymur Stetskov (from Oleksandriya)
—	DF	UKR	Hlib Bukhal (loan return from (Czech Republic) Sigma Olomouc B)
—	DF	UKR	Yevhen Opanasenko (from Inhulets Petrove)
—	DF	UKR	Vitaliy Vernydub (from Zorya Luhansk)
—	MF	UKR	Yevhen Banada (from Metalist Kharkiv)
—	MF	UKR	Dmytro Khomchenovskyi (from Zorya Luhansk)
—	MF	UKR	Tymur Korablin
—	MF	UKR	Andriy Ponedelnik (from Hirnyk-Sport Horishni Plavni)
—	MF	UKR	Artem Schedryi (loan return from (Estonia) Levadia Tallinn)
—	MF	UKR	Nazar Voloshyn (on loan from Dynamo Kyiv)
—	MF	UKR	Maksym Zaderaka (from Metalist 1925 Kharkiv)
—	MF	BIH	Rifet Kapić (from (Bosnia and Herzegovina) Sarajevo)
—	FW	UKR	Oleksiy Khoblenko (loan return from (Estonia) Levadia Tallinn)
—	FW	UKR	Denys Ustymenko (from Oleksandriya)
—	FW	UKR	Vladyslav Semotyuk (from Prykarpattia Ivano-Frankivsk)

Out:

No.	Pos.	Nation	Player
—	GK	UKR	Roman Lyopka (to Karpaty Lviv)
—	GK	UKR	Dmytro Chernysh
—	DF	UKR	Hlib Bukhal (to (Bulgaria) Hebar Pazardzhik)
—	DF	UKR	Denys Balan
—	DF	UKR	Volodymyr Zayimenko
—	DF	UKR	Nazar Malinovskyi
—	MF	UKR	Oleksiy Zbun (to (Lithuania) Džiugas Telšiai)
—	MF	UKR	Artem Hordiyenko
—	MF	UKR	Andriy Mostovyi (to (Germany) FSV Duisburg)
—	MF	CRO	Christian Ilić
—	MF	UKR	Danylo Polonskyi
—	MF	UKR	Oleksandr Pyatov (to (Poland) Olimpia Zambrów)
—	MF	UKR	Oleksandr Horvat
—	MF	UKR	Yevhen Pavlyuk (loan return to Vorskla Poltava)
—	MF	UKR	Ihor Yarovoy
—	FW	UKR	Denys Vasin

=== Lviv ===
In:

No.	Pos.	Nation	Player
—	GK	UKR	Orest Kostyk (loan return from (Lithuania) Jonava)
—	DF	UKR	Artem Vovkun (from MFA Mukachevo)
—	DF	UKR	Pavlo Polehenko (from Inhulets Petrove)
—	MF	UKR	Stanislav Demkiv (loan return from Vovchansk)
—	MF	UKR	Dmytro Penteleychuk (loan return from Vovchansk)
—	MF	BRA	Welves (loan return from (Estonia) Nõmme Kalju)
—	MF	GHA	Ernest Antwi (loan return from (Saudi Arabia) Najran)
—	MF	FRA	Frane Čirjak (loan return from (Bulgaria) Lokomotiv Sofia)
—	MF	UKR	Mykhaylo Shyshka (from Inhulets Petrove)
—	FW	BRA	China (loan return from (Kazakhstan) Aktobe)
—	FW	UKR	Maksym Khimchak (loan return from Vovchansk)
—	FW	BRA	Filipe Pachtmann (loan return from (Azerbaijan) Zira)
—	FW	BRA	Pernambuco (loan return from (Moldova) Sheriff Tiraspol)

Out:

No.	Pos.	Nation	Player
—	DF	UKR	Oleksandr Romanchuk (to (Hungary) Debrecen)
—	DF	UKR	Oleksiy Zozulya (loan return to Kolos Kovalivka)
—	MF	CRO	Frane Čirjak (to (Bosnia and Herzegovina) Sarajevo)
—	MF	UKR	Oleksiy Dovhyi (to Rukh Lviv)
—	MF	UGA	Farouk Miya (to (Turkey) Çaykur Rizespor)
—	MF	UKR	Serhiy Politylo (to Chornomorets Odesa)
—	MF	BRA	Welves (to (Portugal) Trofense)
—	MF	UKR	Dmytro Penteleychuk (to Yarud Mariupol)
—	FW	BRA	Filipe Pachtmann (to (Azerbaijan) Zira)

=== Metalist Kharkiv ===
In:

No.	Pos.	Nation	Player
—	GK	UKR	Artur Denchuk (loan return from Peremoha Dnipro)
—	GK	UKR	Artur Rudko (from (Cyprus) Pafos)
—	GK	UKR	Oleksandr Rybka (loan return from (Turkey) Boluspor)
—	DF	UKR	Yuriy Kravchuk (loan return from Hirnyk-Sport Horishni Plavni)
—	DF	UKR	Oleksandr Kaplienko (from (Latvia) Auda)
—	DF	BRA	Maílton (from (Brazil) Atlético Mineiro)
—	DF	UKR	Mykyta Teplyakov (loan return from FC Vovchansk)
—	DF	UKR	Andriy Tsurikov (loan return from FC Oleksandriya)
—	MF	UKR	Ruslan Babenko (from Polissya Zhytomyr)
—	MF	UKR	Maksym Bahachanskyi (loan return from FC Vovchansk)
—	MF	ECU	Juan Cazares (loan return from (Argentina) Independiente)
—	MF	ENG	Kadeem Harris (loan return from (Turkey) Tuzlaspor)
—	MF	UKR	Danylo Knysh (from FC Mynai)
—	MF	UKR	Dmytro Korkishko (from (Kazakhstan) Aktobe)
—	MF	UKR	Vladyslav Krayev (loan return from Peremoha Dnipro)
—	MF	UKR	Serhiy Panasenko (from Veres Rivne)
—	MF	BRA	Paulinho Bóia (loan return from (Brazil) América Mineiro)
—	MF	ARG	Gerónimo Poblete (loan return from (Argentina) Independiente)
—	MF	UKR	Artur Murza (loan return from (Kazakhstan) Kyzylzhar)
—	FW	UKR	Denys Kuzubov (loan return from FC Vovchansk)
—	FW	COL	Brayan Riascos (loan return from (Switzerland) Grasshopper)

Out:

No.	Pos.	Nation	Player
—	GK	UKR	Andriy Bubentsov (to (Poland) Orlęta Radzyń Podlaski)
—	GK	UKR	Artur Rudko (on loan to (Poland) Lech Poznań)
—	GK	UKR	Vladyslav Rybak (on loan to SC Dnipro-1)
—	GK	UKR	Oleksandr Rybka
—	DF	BRA	Maílton (on loan to (Brazil) Chapecoense)
—	DF	UKR	Andriy Tsurikov (to FC Oleksandriya)
—	MF	UKR	Ruslan Babenko (to SC Dnipro-1)
—	MF	UKR	Yevhen Banada (to Kryvbas Kryvyi Rih (2020))
—	MF	UKR	Artem Bilyi (to (Armenia) FC Van)
—	MF	ENG	Kadeem Harris (to (Turkey) Samsunspor)
—	MF	UKR	Serhiy Horbunov (to SC Dnipro-1)
—	MF	UKR	Artur Murza (to (Latvia) Valmiera)
—	MF	ARG	Gerónimo Poblete (to (United Arab Emirates) Al-Wasl)
—	MF	UKR	Anton Postupalenko (retired)
—	MF	UKR	Eduard Sarapiy (on loan to SC Dnipro-1)
—	MF	UKR	Volodymyr Tanchyk (to SC Dnipro-1)
—	FW	UKR	Ruslan Fomin (retired)
—	FW	COL	Brayan Riascos (on loan to (Saudi Arabia) Al-Khaleej)
—	FW	BRA	Paulinho Bóia (on loan to (Japan) Kyoto Sanga)

=== Metalist 1925 Kharkiv ===
In:

No.	Pos.	Nation	Player
—	GK	UKR	Oleh Mozil (from Ahrobiznes Volochysk)
—	DF	UKR	Ihor Kurylo (from Ahrobiznes Volochysk)
—	DF	BIH	Amar Kvakić (loan return from (Austria) Floridsdorfer AC)
—	MF	BRA	Fabinho (loan return from (Brazil) Ponte Preta)
—	MF	UKR	Denys Rezepov (loan return from Vovchansk)
—	MF	UKR	Yaroslav Martynyuk (from Rukh Lviv)

Out:

No.	Pos.	Nation	Player
—	GK	UKR	Denys Shelikhov (to LNZ Cherkasy)
—	DF	BIH	Amar Kvakić (to (Bosnia and Herzegovina) Velež Mostar)
—	DF	UKR	Vitaliy Yermakov (to Chornomorets Odesa)
—	MF	UKR	Yuriy Batyushyn (to (Georgia (country)) Dila Gori)
—	MF	UKR	Serhiy Chenbay (to Inhulets Petrove)
—	MF	UKR	Oleksiy Ohurtsov (to (Germany) Carl Zeiss Jena)
—	MF	UKR	Anton Savin (to LNZ Cherkasy)
—	MF	UKR	Maksym Zaderaka (to Kryvbas Kryvyi Rih (2020))
—	MF	UKR	Denys Rezepov (to Inhulets Petrove)

=== Mynai ===
In:

No.	Pos.	Nation	Player
—	DF	UKR	Vladyslav Chushenko (loan return from Uzhhorod)
—	DF	UKR	Viktor Lykhovydko (loan return from (Poland) Narew Ostrołęka)
—	DF	UKR	Ivan Trubochkin (from Olimpik Donetsk)
—	DF	UKR	Bohdan Chuyev (from Vorskla Poltava)
—	DF	UKR	Taras Dmytruk (from Vorskla Poltava)
—	MF	UKR	Ruslan Palamar (from Hirnyk-Sport Horishni Plavni)
—	MF	UKR	Vadym Vitenchuk (from FC Kramatorsk)
—	FW	UKR	Danylo Kolesnyk (from VPK-Ahro Shevchenkivka)
—	FW	UKR	Ivan Stankovych (loan return from Uzhhorod)

Out:

No.	Pos.	Nation	Player
—	DF	UKR	Ihor Duts (to Karpaty Lviv)
—	DF	UKR	Viktor Lykhovydko (to (Poland) Górnik Łęczna)
—	MF	UKR	Danylo Knysh (to Metalist Kharkiv)
—	MF	CRO	Mislav Matić (to (Croatia) HNK Šibenik)
—	MF	UKR	Mykhaylo Meskhi (to (Hungary) Kecskemét)
—	MF	UKR	Vladyslav Naumets (to Chornomorets Odesa)
—	MF	UKR	Oleh Synyohub (to LNZ Cherkasy)

=== Oleksandriya ===
In:

No.	Pos.	Nation	Player
—	GK	UKR	Heorhiy Yermakov (from Shakhtar Donetsk)
—	DF	UKR	Maksym Dyachuk (on loan from Dynamo Kyiv)
—	DF	UKR	Andriy Tsurikov (from Metalist Kharkiv)
—	DF	UKR	Danil Skorko (from Zorya Luhansk)
—	MF	UKR	Maksym Ivakhno (loan return from Dnipro Cherkasy)
—	MF	UKR	Ivan Kalyuzhnyi (loan return from (Iceland) Keflavík)
—	MF	UKR	Oleksandr Martynyuk (from Volyn Lutsk)
—	MF	UKR	Artem Shulyanskyi (from Dynamo Kyiv)
—	MF	UKR	Vikentiy Voloshyn (on loan from Dynamo Kyiv)
—	FW	UKR	Bohdan Kobzar (from Volyn Lutsk)

Out:

No.	Pos.	Nation	Player
—	GK	UKR	Heorhiy Yermakov (loan return to Shakhtar Donetsk)
—	DF	UKR	Tymur Stetskov (to Kryvbas Kryvyi Rih (2020))
—	MF	UKR	Ivan Kalyuzhnyi (on loan to (India) Kerala Blasters)
—	MF	UKR	Volodymyr Odaryuk (to Inhulets Petrove)
—	MF	UKR	Andriy Tsurikov (loan return to Metalist Kharkiv)
—	FW	UKR	Denys Ustymenko (to Kryvbas Kryvyi Rih (2020))

=== Rukh Lviv ===
In:

No.	Pos.	Nation	Player
—	GK	UKR	Viktor Babichyn (loan return from VPK-Ahro)
—	DF	SEN	Elhadji Pape Diaw (loan return from (Poland) Arka Gdynia)
—	DF	UKR	Oleh Len (loan return from Prykarpattia Ivano-Frankivsk)
—	DF	UKR	Oleh Veremiyenko (loan return from Podillya Khmelnytskyi)
—	MF	UKR	Oleksiy Dovhyi (from FC Lviv)
—	MF	BRA	Edson (loan return from (Brazil) Atlético Goianiense)
—	MF	GLP	Ange-Freddy Plumain (loan return from (Israel) Hapoel Tel Aviv)
—	MF	BRA	Talles (loan return from (Finland) KuPS)

Out:

No.	Pos.	Nation	Player
—	DF	SEN	Elhadji Pape Diaw (on loan to (France) Stade Lavallois)
—	DF	UKR	Roman Hahun (to Veres Rivne)
—	DF	UKR	Oleh Len (to Karpaty Lviv)
—	DF	UKR	Volodymyr Radulskyi (on loan to Prykarpattia Ivano-Frankivsk)
—	MF	UKR	Vladyslav Buchakchyiskyi (on loan to Prykarpattia Ivano-Frankivsk)
—	MF	UKR	Ivan Lytvynenko (to Chornomorets Odesa)
—	MF	UKR	Yaroslav Martynyuk (to Metalist 1925 Kharkiv)
—	MF	GLP	Ange-Freddy Plumain (to (Israel) Sektzia Nes Tziona)
—	MF	UKR	Roman Karasyuk (to (Armenia) Pyunik Yerevan)
—	FW	UKR	Danylo Kondrakov (to (Latvia) Sūduva)

=== Shakhtar Donetsk ===
In:

No.	Pos.	Nation	Player
—	GK	UKR	Mykyta Turbayevskyi (loan return from (Croatia) Lokomotiva Zagreb)
—	GK	UKR	Heorhiy Yermakov (loan return from FC Oleksandriya)
—	DF	UKR	Daniel Ehbudzhuo (loan return from FC Vovchansk)
—	DF	UKR	Eduard Kozik (loan return from FC Mariupol)
—	DF	BRA	Marquinhos Cipriano (loan return from (Switzerland) FC Sion)
—	MF	CRO	Neven Đurasek (from (Croatia) Dinamo Zagreb)
—	MF	UKR	Illya Hulko (loan return from (Croatia) Lokomotiva Zagreb)
—	MF	UKR	Danylo Ihnatenko (loan return from (France) Bordeaux)
—	MF	UKR	Oleksiy Kashchuk (loan return from (Azerbaijan) Sabah)
—	MF	UKR	Artem Kholod (loan return from Mariupol)
—	MF	UKR	Bohdan Mykhaylichenko (on loan from (Belgium) Anderlecht)
—	MF	UKR	Oleh Ocheretko (loan return from Mariupol)
—	MF	UKR	Denys Shostak (loan return from Mariupol)
—	MF	UKR	Andriy Totovytskyi (from Kolos Kovalivka)
—	MF	UKR	Oleksandr Zubkov (from (Hungary) Ferencváros)
—	MF	BRA	Lucas Taylor (loan from (Greece) PAOK)
—	FW	UKR	Danylo Honcharuk (loan return from Mariupol)
—	FW	NGR	Olarenwaju Kayode (loan return from (Turkey) Sivasspor)
—	FW	UKR	Edvard Kobak (loan return from (Croatia) Dubrava Zagreb)
—	FW	UKR	Andriy Kulakov (loan return from (Turkey) Tuzlaspor)
—	FW	UKR	Artur Mykytyshyn (loan return from (Hungary) III. Kerületi)
—	FW	UKR	Danylo Sikan (loan return from (Germany) Hansa Rostock)

Out:

No.	Pos.	Nation	Player
—	GK	UKR	Yevhen Hrytsenko
—	GK	UKR	Heorhiy Yermakov (to FC Oleksandriya)
—	DF	UKR	Serhiy Bolbat (to Kolos Kovalivka)
—	DF	BRA	Dodô (to (Italy) Fiorentina)
—	DF	UKR	Oleksandr Drambayev (on loan to (Belgium) Zulte Waregem)
—	DF	BRA	Ismaily (to (France) Lille)
—	DF	BRA	Marlon Santos (on loan to (Italy) Monza)
—	DF	BRA	Marquinhos Cipriano (on loan to (Brazil) Cruzeiro)
—	MF	UKR	Artem Kholod (on loan to (United States) El Paso Locomotive)
—	MF	BRA	David Neres (to (Portugal) Benfica)
—	MF	UKR	Danylo Ihnatenko (to (France) Bordeaux)
—	MF	BRA	Marcos Antônio (to (Italy) Lazio)
—	MF	BRA	Pedrinho (on loan to (Brazil) Atlético Mineiro)
—	MF	ISR	Manor Solomon (on loan to (England) Fulham)
—	FW	BRA	Fernando (to (Austria) Red Bull Salzburg)
—	FW	UKR	Danylo Honcharuk (on loan to (Spain) Lleida Esportiu)

=== Veres Rivne ===
In:

No.	Pos.	Nation	Player
—	GK	UKR	Arseniy Korkodym (from Volyn Lutsk)
—	DF	UKR	Roman Hahun (from Rukh Lviv)
—	DF	UKR	Vasyl Kurko (from Livyi Bereh Kyiv)
—	DF	UKR	Mykola Kvasnyi (free agent)
—	MF	UKR	Oleksandr Lebedenko (from Alians Lypova Dolyna)
—	DF	ARM	Zhirayr Margaryan (loan return from (Armenia) Urartu)
—	MF	UKR	Vladyslav Sharay (from Alians Lypova Dolyna)
—	MF	UKR	Stanislav Sharay (from Alians Lypova Dolyna)
—	MF	MDA	Mihail Ghecev (loan return from (Moldova) Sfîntul Gheorghe)
—	MF	UKR	Semen Vovchenko (from Nyva Ternopil)

Out:

No.	Pos.	Nation	Player
—	GK	UKR	Artem Kychak (to Obolon Kyiv)
—	DF	UKR	Alan Aussi (loan return to Dynamo Kyiv)
—	DF	ARM	Zhirayr Margaryan (to (Armenia) Urartu)
—	DF	UKR	Ihor Soldat (to LNZ Cherkasy)
—	DF	UKR	Dmytro Makhnyev (to Karpaty Lviv)
—	DF	UKR	Roman Honcharenko (to Kolos Kovalivka)
—	MF	UKR	Serhiy Panasenko (to Metalist Kharkiv)
—	MF	UKR	Serhiy Petko (to Chornomorets Odesa)
—	MF	UKR	Mykyta Polyulyakh (to LNZ Cherkasy)

=== Vorskla Poltava ===
In:

No.	Pos.	Nation	Player
—	DF	UKR	Bohdan Chuyev (loan return from Hirnyk-Sport Horishni Plavni)
—	DF	BRA	Gabriel Nazário (from (Brazil) Figueirense)
—	DF	ALB	Ardit Toli (from (Albania) Tirana)
—	DF	MLI	Ibrahim Kane (loan return from (China) Qingdao Hainiu)
—	DF	UKR	Maksym Melnychuk (loan return from Inhulets Petrove)
—	DF	UKR	Yevhen Pavlyuk (loan return from Kryvbas Kryvyi Rih)
—	DF	BRA	Felipe Rodrigues (from (Brazil) Grêmio Novorizontino)
—	DF	NIG	Najeeb Yakubu (loan return from (Spain) Lugo)
—	DF	MKD	Gjoko Zajkov (loan return from (Bulgaria) Slavia Sofia)
—	DF	EST	Joonas Tamm (loan return from (Estonia) Flora)
—	MF	UKR	Denys Halata (loan return from Kremin Kremenchuk)
—	MF	UKR	Andriy Kravchuk (free agent)
—	MF	UKR	Artem Kulakovskyi (loan return from Hirnyk-Sport Horishni Plavni)
—	MF	UKR	Denys Oliynyk (from (Finland) SJK Seinäjoki)
—	MF	UKR	Radion Posyevkin (loan return from Hirnyk-Sport Horishni Plavni)
—	MF	CRO	David Puclin (loan return from (Netherlands) ADO Den Haag)
—	MF	LUX	Olivier Thill (loan return from (Turkey) Eyüpspor)
—	MF	LUX	Vincent Thill (loan return from (Sweden) Örebro)
—	MF	UKR	Andriy Kravchuk (from (Russia) Torpedo Moscow)
—	MF	MKD	Ennur Totre (from (Albania) KF Tirana)
—	MF	UKR	Maksym Tovstyi (loan return from Yarud Mariupol)
—	MF	UKR	Artem Umanets (loan return from Rubikon Kyiv)
—	FW	UKR	Leon Hladkovskyi (loan return from Vovchansk)
—	FW	UKR	Yuriy Kozyrenko (loan return from (Belarus) Isloch Minsk Raion)
—	FW	BRA	Marlyson (on loan from (Brazil) Figueirense)
—	FW	UKR	Dmytro Mamro (loan return from Yarud Mariupol)
—	FW	TAN	Yohana Mkomola (loan return from Hirnyk-Sport Horishni Plavni)
—	FW	BRA	Lucas Rangel (loan return from (Azerbaijan) Sabah)

Out:

No.	Pos.	Nation	Player
—	DF	EST	Joonas Tamm (to (Romania) FCSB)
—	DF	GHA	Najeeb Yakubu (to (Finland) Ilves)
—	DF	UKR	Bohdan Chuyev (to Mynai)
—	DF	UKR	Taras Dmytruk (to Mynai)
—	MF	LUX	Olivier Thill
—	MF	LUX	Vincent Thill (on loan to (Sweden) AIK)
—	FW	BRA	Lucas Rangel (loan to (Latvia) Riga)

=== Zorya Luhansk ===
In:

No.	Pos.	Nation	Player
—	DF	BRA	Juninho (loan return from (Brazil) Goiás)
—	DF	UKR	Tymofiy Sukhar (loan return from VPK-Ahro Shevchenkivka)
—	DF	UKR	Roman Vantukh (on loan from Zorya Luhansk)
—	MF	UKR	Volodymyr Bilotserkovets (loan return from Metalurh Zaporizhya)
—	MF	BRA	Cristian (loan return from (Brazil) Caxias do Sul)
—	MF	UKR	Arseniy Batahov (from Dnipro-1)
—	MF	UKR	Volodymyr Brazhko (on loan to Zorya Luhansk)
—	MF	UKR	Vyacheslav Churko (from Kolos Kovalivka)
—	MF	UKR	Mykola Mykhaylenko (on loan from Dynamo Kyiv)
—	MF	UKR	Dmytro Myshnyov (from Mariupol)
—	MF	UKR	Denys Yanakov (loan return from Polissya Zhytomyr)
—	FW	UKR	Denys Bezborodko (on loan from Desna Chernihiv)
—	FW	UKR	Nazariy Rusyn (from Dynamo Kyiv)

Out:

No.	Pos.	Nation	Player
—	DF	UKR	Danil Skorko (to Oleksandriya)
—	DF	UKR	Yuriy Dudnyk
—	DF	UKR	Denys Favorov (to (Poland) Wieczysta Kraków)
—	DF	BRA	Juninho (to (Cyprus) Pafos)
—	DF	UKR	Tymofiy Sukhar (to (Slovakia) FC Petržalka)
—	DF	UKR	Vitaliy Vernydub (to Kryvbas Kryvyi Rih)
—	DF	UKR	Vladyslav Yemets (to Kolos Kovalivka)
—	MF	UKR	Volodymyr Bilotserkovets (to Metalurh Zaporizhya)
—	MF	UKR	Dmytro Khomchenovskyi (to Kryvbas Kryvyi Rih)
—	MF	UKR	Artem Hromov (to Dnipro-1)
—	MF	UKR	Yuriy Tlumak (on loan to Karpaty Lviv)
—	FW	GHA	Raymond Owusu (to (Turkey) İstanbulspor)

== Ukrainian First League ==
=== LNZ Cherkasy ===
In:

No.	Pos.	Nation	Player
—	GK	AZE	Andrey Popovich (loan return from (Azerbaijan) Sumgayit)
—	DF	UKR	Ihor Soldat (from Veres Rivne)
—	MF	UKR	Anton Savin (from Metalist 1925 Kharkiv)
—	MF	UKR	Andriy Lyashenko (from Volyn Lutsk)
—	MF	UKR	Oleh Synyohub (from Mynai)
—	MF	UKR	Mykyta Polyulyakh (from Veres Rivne)
—	MF	UKR	Arsen Slotyuk (from Ahrobiznes Volochysk)
—	MF	UKR	Serhiy Shvets (from Kramatorsk)

Out:

No.	Pos.	Nation	Player
—	GK	UKR	Dmytro Fastov (to Karpaty Lviv)
—	MF	UKR	Yuriy Ivanochko (loan return to Dnipro Cherkasy)
—	MF	UKR	Oleh Kos (loan return to Dnipro Cherkasy)
—	MF	UKR	Illya Kovalenko (to (Kazakhstan) Akzhayik)

=== FC Chernihiv ===
In:

No.	Pos.	Nation	Player
—	GK	UKR	Yehor Kolomiets (from Desna-3 Chernihiv)
—	DF	UKR	Eduard Halstyan (from Desna-2 Chernihiv)
—	DF	UKR	Oleksandr Rudenko (from Kudrivka)
—	MF	UKR	Vladyslav Panko (from Desna-3 Chernihiv)
—	MF	UKR	Vyacheslav Koydan (from Olimpik Donetsk)
—	MF	UKR	Volodymyr Zubashivskyi (from Kudrivka)
—	MF	UKR	Vladyslav Shkolnyi (from Desna-3 Chernihiv)
—	MF	UKR	Myroslav Serdyuk (from Kudrivka)
—	MF	UKR	Dmytro Kulyk (from Kudrivka)
—	MF	UKR	Mykola Syrash (from Kudrivka)
—	FW	UKR	Roman Vovk (from Kudrivka)

Out:

No.	Pos.	Nation	Player
—	DF	UKR	Mykyta Hrebenshchykov (End of Contract)
—	MF	UKR	Andriy Porokhnya (to Druzhba Myrivka)
—	MF	UKR	Denys Kildiy (to (Lithuania) FC Akmene)
—	MF	UKR	Dmytro Borshch (End of Contract)
—	FW	UKR	Bohdan Lytvynenko (End of Contract)
—	FW	UKR	Anatoliy Kokhanovskyi (End of Contract)
—	FW	UKR	Maksym Chaus (End of Contract)
—	FW	UKR	Vladyslav Kyryn (End of Contract)

=== Dinaz Vyshhorod ===
In:

No.	Pos.	Nation	Player
—	MF	UKR	Dzhilindo Bezghubchenko (from Desna Chernihiv)
—	MF	UKR	Maksym Kulish (from Rubikon Kyiv)
—	FW	UKR	Vladyslav Klymenko (from SC Chaika)

Out:

No.	Pos.	Nation	Player
—	MF	UKR	Bohdan Dukhota (loan return to Kolos Kovalivka)
—	MF	UKR	Zakhar Dobrovolskyi (loan return to Lyubomyr Stavyshche)
—	MF	UKR	Yuriy Maley (End of Contract)
—	MF	UKR	Vadym Bovtruk (to Shturm Ivankiv)

=== Hirnyk-Sport Horishni Plavni ===
In:

No.	Pos.	Nation	Player

Out:

No.	Pos.	Nation	Player
—	DF	UKR	Yuriy Kravchuk (on loan to Metalist Kharkiv)
—	DF	UKR	Radion Posyevkin (on loan to Vorskla Poltava)
—	DF	UKR	Bohdan Chuyev (on loan to Vorskla Poltava)
—	MF	UKR	Artem Kulakovskyi (on loan to Vorskla Poltava)
—	FW	TAN	Yohana Mkomola (on loan to Vorskla Poltava)

=== Yarud Mariupol ===
In:

No.	Pos.	Nation	Player
—	GK	UKR	Mykyta Yakubenko (from Kramatorsk)
—	GK	UKR	Illya Karavashchenko (from Desna Chernihiv)
—	MF	UKR	Dmytro Penteleychuk (from Lviv)
—	MF	UKR	Danylo Litovchenko (from Mariupol)
—	MF	UKR	Vladyslav Chushenko (from Mynai)
—	MF	UKR	Pavlo Shushko (from Mariupol)

Out:

No.	Pos.	Nation	Player
—	GK	UKR	Oleh Honcharenko (End of Contract)
—	GK	AZE	Oleg Karnaukh (End of Contract)
—	MF	UKR	Vladyslav Sandrak-Vinnytskyi (to (Georgia (country)) Kolkheti-1913 Poti)

=== Nyva Ternopil ===
In:

No.	Pos.	Nation	Player

Out:

No.	Pos.	Nation	Player
—	MF	UKR	Taras Moroz (to Obolon Kyiv)
—	MF	UKR	Semen Vovchenko (to Veres Rivne)
—	MF	UKR	Kostyantyn Bychek

=== Obolon Kyiv ===
In:

No.	Pos.	Nation	Player
—	GK	UKR	Artem Kychak (from Veres Rivne)
—	DF	UKR	Oleh Boroday (on loan from (Poland) Broń Radom)
—	MF	UKR	Danylo Karas (from Ahrobiznes Volochysk)
—	MF	UKR	Taras Moroz (from Nyva Ternopil)
—	MF	UKR	Serhiy Mashtalir (from Podillya Khmelnytskyi)
—	MF	UKR	Serhiy Kosovskyi (from VPK-Ahro)
—	MF	UKR	Artem Terekhov
—	MF	UKR	Ruslan Chernenko (from (Bulgaria) Spartak Varna)

Out:

No.	Pos.	Nation	Player
—	GK	UKR	Ivan Tyurin (to (France) Rumilly-Vallières)
—	GK	UKR	Vasyl Lytvynenko (to (Poland) Widzew Łódź)
—	DF	UKR	Oleksiy Lobov (to (Bulgaria) Hebar)
—	DF	UKR	Oleksiy Maydanevych

=== Polissya Zhytomyr ===
In:

No.	Pos.	Nation	Player

Out:

No.	Pos.	Nation	Player
—	MF	UKR	Denys Yanakov (on loan return to Zorya Luhansk)

=== Prykarpattia Ivano-Frankivsk ===
In:

No.	Pos.	Nation	Player

Out:

No.	Pos.	Nation	Player
—	DF	UKR	Oleh Len (on loan return to Rukh Lviv)
—	MF	UKR	Volodymyr Rudyuk (on loan return to Rukh Lviv)
—	FW	UKR	Vladyslav Semotyuk (to Kryvbas Kryvyi Rih)

== Ukrainian Second League ==
=== SC Chaika ===
In:

No.	Pos.	Nation	Player

Out:

No.	Pos.	Nation	Player
—	MF	BRA	Nivaldo (to (England) Radcliffe)

=== Dnipro Cherkasy ===
In:

No.	Pos.	Nation	Player
—	MF	UKR	Yuriy Ivanochko (loan return from LNZ Cherkasy)
—	MF	UKR	Oleh Kos (loan return from LNZ Cherkasy)

Out:

No.	Pos.	Nation	Player

=== Epitsentr Dunaivtsi ===
In:

No.	Pos.	Nation	Player

Out:

No.	Pos.	Nation	Player
―	MF	UKR	Yevhen Nemtinov (to (Slovenia) Tatran Prešov)

=== Karpaty Lviv ===
In:

No.	Pos.	Nation	Player
—	GK	UKR	Dmytro Fastov (from LNZ Cherkasy)
—	DF	UKR	Ihor Duts (from Mynai)
—	MF	UKR	Dmytro Makhnyev (from Veres Rivne)
—	MF	UKR	Yuriy Repeta
—	MF	UKR	Mykola Kohut (from Ahrobiznes Volochysk)
—	MF	UKR	Ivan Kohut (from Ahrobiznes Volochysk)

Out:

No.	Pos.	Nation	Player
—	GK	UKR	Maksym Kuchynskyi (to (Czech Republic) Znojmo)
—	GK	UKR	Nazar-Stefan Sass
—	GK	UKR	Ivan Siletsky
—	DF	UKR	Volodymyr Zastavnyi (to (Czech Republic) Stará Říše)
—	DF	UKR	Oleksandr Matkobozhyk
—	DF	UKR	Oleksandr Dudarenko
—	DF	UKR	Serhiy Siminin
—	MF	UKR	Ihor Semenyna (to (Czech Republic) Holešov)
—	MF	UKR	Illya Povaliy

=== Mukachevo ===
In:

No.	Pos.	Nation	Player

Out:

No.	Pos.	Nation	Player
—	DF	UKR	Artem Vovkun (to Lviv)

=== Niva Buzova ===
In:

No.	Pos.	Nation	Player
—	MF	UKR	Denys Skepskyi (from Viktoriya Mykolaivka)

Out:

No.	Pos.	Nation	Player

=== Rubikon Kyiv ===
In:

No.	Pos.	Nation	Player
—	DF	UKR	Pavlo Shostka

Out:

No.	Pos.	Nation	Player
—	MF	UKR	Yaroslav Annich (loan return to Krystal Kherson)
—	MF	UKR	Maksym Kulish (to Dinaz Vyshhorod)
—	MF	UKR	Oleh Lutsenko

=== Viktoriya Mykolaivka ===
In:

No.	Pos.	Nation	Player

Out:

No.	Pos.	Nation	Player
—	MF	UKR	Denys Skepskyi (to Niva Buzova)

== Omitted teams from the Ukrainian Premier League ==
Due to the full-scale invasion of Russia, two teams: Desna Chernihiv and Mariupol, were omitted from the upcoming Ukrainian Premier League season, because complete destruction of their infrastructure. However, they are remaining as a members of the Ukrainian Premier League.

=== Desna Chernihiv ===
In:

No.	Pos.	Nation	Player
—	GK	UKR	Dmytro Sydorenko (loan return from (Poland) Boguchwała)
—	DF	UKR	Oleksandr Safronov (loan return from (Slovenia) Nafta 1903)
—	MF	UKR	Andriy Dombrovskyi (loan return from (Poland) Termalica)
—	MF	UKR	Yevheniy Belych (loan return from (Poland) Piast Nowa Ruda)
—	FW	UKR	Denys Bezborodko (loan return from (Hungary) Gyirmót)

Out:

No.	Pos.	Nation	Player
—	GK	UKR	Dmytro Sydorenko (to (Poland) Pogoń Grodzisk)
—	GK	UKR	Ihor Lytovka (to (Croatia) Zagora Unešić)
—	GK	UKR	Roman Mysak (End of Contract)
—	GK	UKR	Illya Karavashchenko (to FSC Mariupol)
—	DF	UKR	Yevhen Tsymbalyuk (to (Armenia) Urartu)
—	DF	UKR	Danyil Pus (to (Croatia) NK Kutjevo)
—	DF	UKR	Vadym Zhuk (to (Germany) Bayern Hof)
—	DF	UKR	Oleksandr Masalov (to (Russia) Ufa)
—	DF	UKR	Yevhen Selin (to Chornomorets Odesa)
—	DF	UKR	Oleksandr Safronov (to (Hungary) Zalaegerszeg)
—	DF	BLR	Artem Khatskevich (loan return to Dynamo Kyiv)
—	MF	UKR	Vikentiy Voloshyn (loan return to Dynamo Kyiv)
—	MF	UKR	Andriy Dombrovskyi (to (Poland) Termalica Nieciecza)
—	MF	UKR	Taras Zaviyskyi (to (Poland) Termalica Nieciecza)
—	MF	UKR	Denys Demyanenko (to (Poland) Cosmos Nowotaniec)
—	MF	UKR	Yevheniy Belych (to (Poland) Orzeł Ząbkowice Śląskie)
—	MF	UKR	Dzhilindo Bezghubchenko (to Dinaz Vyshhorod)
—	MF	UKR	Serhiy Makarenko (to (Poland) Orzeł Ząbkowice Śląskie)
—	FW	GRE	Georgios Ermidis (End of Contract)
—	FW	UKR	Denys Bezborodko (on loan to Zorya Luhansk)
—	FW	UKR	Maksym Dehtyarov (to (Kazakhstan) Taraz)
—	FW	UKR	Illya Shevtsov (on loan to (United States) Charlotte)

=== Mariupol ===
In:

No.	Pos.	Nation	Player
—	MF	UKR	Oleksiy Bykov (loan return from (Iceland) KA)

Out:

No.	Pos.	Nation	Player
—	GK	UKR	Yevhen Halchuk (loan return to Inhulets Petrove)
—	DF	UKR	Serhiy Chobotenko (to Dnipro-1)
—	MF	UKR	Oleh Ocheretko (loan return to Shakhtar Donetsk)
—	MF	UKR	Mykhaylo Khromey (loan return to Shakhtar Donetsk)
—	MF	UKR	Denys Shostak (loan return to Shakhtar Donetsk)
—	MF	UKR	Artem Kholod (loan return to Shakhtar Donetsk)
—	MF	UKR	Dmytro Myshnyov (to Zorya Luhansk)
—	MF	UKR	Kyrylo Melichenko (to (Germany) Dynamo Dresden)
—	MF	UKR	Oleksiy Bykov (on loan to (Poland) Zagłębie Sosnowiec)
—	MF	UKR	Danylo Litovchenko (to Yarud Mariupol)
—	FW	UKR	Andriy Kulakov (loan return to Shakhtar Donetsk)
—	FW	UKR	Denys Svityukha (loan return to Shakhtar Donetsk)

== Omitted teams from the Ukrainian First League ==
=== FC VPK-Ahro Shevchenkivka ===
In:

No.	Pos.	Nation	Player

Out:

No.	Pos.	Nation	Player
—	GK	UKR	Viktor Babichyn (loan return to Rukh Lviv)
—	DF	UKR	Denys Taraduda (to (Estonia) Narva Trans)
—	DF	UKR	Tymofiy Sukhar (loan return to Zorya Luhansk)
—	MF	BRA	Daniel Jesus (End of Contract)
—	MF	BRA	Vicente (to (Brazil) Sertãozinho Futebol Clube)
—	MF	UKR	Oleksandr Yarovenko (End of Contract])
—	MF	UKR	Viktor Babichyn (loan return to Rukh Lviv)
—	MF	UKR	Serhiy Kosovskyi (to Obolon Kyiv)
—	MF	UKR	Danylo Kolesnyk (to Mynai)
—	FW	UKR	Stanislav Kulish (End of Contract)

=== Ahrobiznes Volochysk ===
In:

No.	Pos.	Nation	Player
—	MF	UKR	Ruslan Chernenko (loan return from (Bulgaria) Marek Dupnitsa)
—	MF	UKR	Ruslan Zubkov (loan return from (Poland) Ruch Chorzów)
—	MF	UKR	Arsen Slotyuk (loan return from (Poland) Kotwica Kołobrzeg)

Out:

No.	Pos.	Nation	Player
—	GK	UKR	Oleh Mozil (to Metalist 1925 Kharkiv)
—	DF	UKR	Ihor Kurylo (to Metalist 1925 Kharkiv)
—	MF	UKR	Ruslan Chernenko (to (Bulgaria) Spartak Varna)
—	MF	UKR	Ruslan Zubkov (to (Poland) Polonia Bytom)
—	MF	UKR	Arsen Slotyuk (to LNZ Cherkasy)
—	MF	UKR	Danylo Karas (to Obolon Kyiv)
—	MF	UKR	Renat Mochulyak (End of Contract)

=== Alians Lypova Dolyna ===
In:

No.	Pos.	Nation	Player
—	MF	UKR	Dmytro Ulyanov (loan return from (Slovakia) Vranov nad Topľou)

Out:

No.	Pos.	Nation	Player
—	MF	UKR	Ivan Brikner (to (Kazakhstan) Zhetysu)
—	MF	UKR	Vladyslav Sharay (to Veres Rivne)
—	MF	UKR	Stanislav Sharay (to Veres Rivne)
—	FW	UKR	Serhiy Zahynaylov (to (Germany) Bayern Hof)

=== Kramatorsk ===
In:

No.	Pos.	Nation	Player

Out:

No.	Pos.	Nation	Player
—	MF	UKR	Vadym Vitenchuk (to Mynai)
—	MF	UKR	Serhiy Shvets (to LNZ Cherkasy)
—	MF	UKR	Arsentiy Doroshenko (loan return to Kolos Kovalivka)
—	FW	UKR	Maksym Yermolenko (to Chornomorets Odesa)

=== Kremin Kremenchuk ===
In:

No.	Pos.	Nation	Player

Out:

No.	Pos.	Nation	Player
—	MF	UKR	Oleksandr Holovko (to (France) Raon-l'Étape)
—	MF	UKR	Suleyman Seytkhalilov (on loan return to Inhulets Petrove)
—	MF	UKR	Denys Halata (on loan return to Vorskla Poltava)

=== Olimpik Donetsk ===
In:

No.	Pos.	Nation	Player

Out:

No.	Pos.	Nation	Player
—	MF	UKR	Ivan Trubochkin (to Mynai)
—	FW	UKR	Vyacheslav Koydan (to FC Chernihiv)

=== FC Podillya Khmelnytskyi ===
In:

No.	Pos.	Nation	Player

Out:

No.	Pos.	Nation	Player
—	MF	UKR	Stanislav Morarenko (loan return to Kolos Kovalivka)
—	MF	UKR	Oleh Veremiyenko (loan return to Rukh Lviv)
—	MF	UKR	Artur Vashchyshyn (loan return to Dynamo Kyiv)
—	MF	UKR	Serhiy Mashtalir (to Obolon Kyiv)

=== Uzhhorod ===
In:

No.	Pos.	Nation	Player

Out:

No.	Pos.	Nation	Player
—	GK	UKR	Dmytro Kashka (loan return to Mynai)
—	DF	UKR	Vladyslav Chushenko (loan return to Mynai)
—	FW	UKR	Ivan Stankovych (loan return to Mynai)

=== Volyn Lutsk ===
In:

No.	Pos.	Nation	Player

Out:

No.	Pos.	Nation	Player
—	DF	UKR	Maksym Voytikhovskyi (to Chornomorets Odesa)
—	MF	UKR	Andriy Lyashenko (to LNZ Cherkasy)

== Omitted teams from the Ukrainian Second League ==
=== Balkany Zorya ===
In:

No.	Pos.	Nation	Player

Out:

No.	Pos.	Nation	Player
—	DF	UKR	Volodymyr Salyuk (to Chornomorets Odesa)
—	MF	UKR	Pavlo Fedosov (End of Contract)
—	MF	UKR	Viktor Serdenyuk (to (Republic of Ireland) Shamrock Rovers)

=== Enerhiya Nova Kakhovka ===
In:

No.	Pos.	Nation	Player

Out:

No.	Pos.	Nation	Player
—	MF	UKR	Yaroslav Terekhov (loan return to (Latvia) Spartaks Jūrmala)

=== Karpaty Halych ===
In:

No.	Pos.	Nation	Player

Out:

No.	Pos.	Nation	Player

=== Livyi Bereh Kyiv ===
In:

No.	Pos.	Nation	Player

Out:

No.	Pos.	Nation	Player
—	DF	UKR	Maksym Banasevych (to (Canada) Continentals)

=== Lyubomyr Stavyshche ===
In:

No.	Pos.	Nation	Player
—	MF	UKR	Zakhar Dobrovolskyi (loan return from Dinaz Vyshhorod)

Out:

No.	Pos.	Nation	Player
—	DF	UKR	Andriy Marchuk (loan return to Kolos Kovalivka)

=== Nikopol ===
In:

No.	Pos.	Nation	Player

Out:

No.	Pos.	Nation	Player
—	GK	UKR	Bohdan Khoma (loan return to Dnipro-1)

=== Sumy ===
In:

No.	Pos.	Nation	Player

Out:

No.	Pos.	Nation	Player

=== Tavriya Simferopol ===
In:

No.	Pos.	Nation	Player

Out:

No.	Pos.	Nation	Player

=== Trostianets ===
In:

No.	Pos.	Nation	Player

Out:

No.	Pos.	Nation	Player
