= Frantsuz =

Frantsuz (Ukrainian: Француз) is a Ukrainian surname, meaning "Frenchman". Notable people with the surname include:

- Anatoliy Frantsuz (1954–2025), Ukrainian politician
- Vasyl Frantsuz (born 1996), Ukrainian footballer

== See also ==
- Maxim Franțuz (born 1986), Moldovan football player
- The French Guy, Russian original title Француз, a 2004 Russian romantic comedy film
