= Drabiv =

Rural locality in Cherkasy Oblast, Ukraine

Drabiv Драбів
- Rural settlement
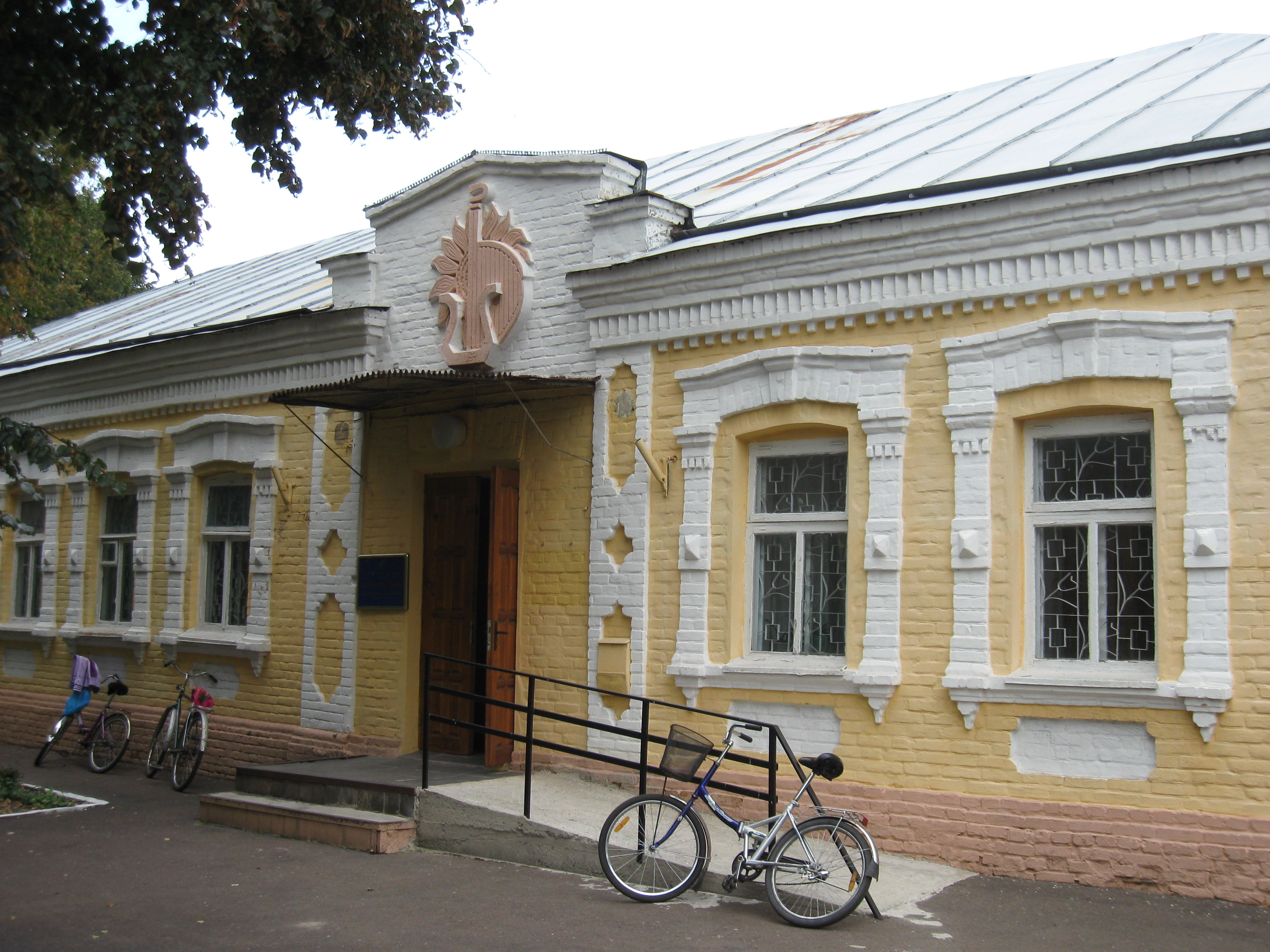
- Drabiv local history museum

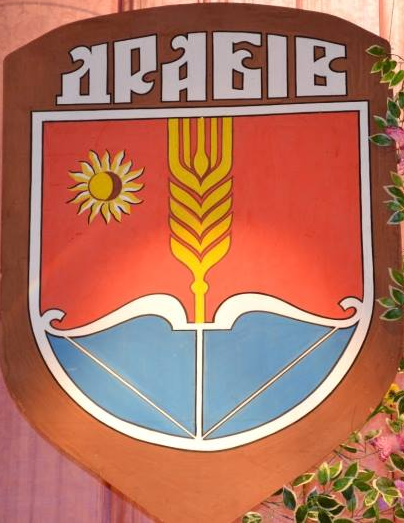
- Coat of arms

- Location within Cherkasy Oblast Location within Ukraine
- Coordinates: 49.962406°N 32.149683°E
- Country: Ukraine
- Oblast: Cherkasy Oblast
- Raion: Zolotonosha Raion
- Founded: 1680

Government
  - Chairman of the raion council: Osadchyy Ivan Vasylovych

Area
  - Total: 18.019 km^{2} (6.957 sq mi)
- Elevation: 121 m (397 ft)

Population
  - Total: 6,085
- Time zone: UTC+2 (EET)
  - Summer (DST): UTC+3 (EEST)
- Postal code: 19800 — 19805
- Area code: +38 04738

Drabiv (Ukrainian: Драбів) is a rural settlement in Zolotonosha Raion, Cherkasy Oblast, central Ukraine. It hosts the administration of Drabiv settlement hromada, one of the hromadas of Ukraine. Population: 6,085 (2022 estimate).

== Geography ==
Drabiv lies in the Dnieper Lowland. The settlement is located in the upper reaches of the Zolotonoshka river, a tributary of the Dnipro, 75 kilometres (47 mi) from the regional center town – Cherkasy, 12 kilometres (7.5 mi) from Drabovo-Bariatynske railway station.

== History ==
The first written mention about Drabiv was made in 1680th year, when rich Cossack and later Pereyaslav Colonel Ivan Myrovych had taken lands with small khutir, (which was there for a long time before) from a free military steppe on the river Zolotonoshka. Myrovych appealed to Czar to issue him a deed for ownership of the estate. In 1691 he received the deed on the khutir with pond, forest, pastures and hayfields. In 1707 khutir consisted of 7 houses. During the Northern war Ivan Myrovych's son – Fedir Myrovych, together with Mazepa joined the Swedish side. After Sweden's defeat, in accordance with the decree issued by Peter I in 1718, all estates of Myrovych's family, including khutir Drabiv were transferred to duke Kantakuzen.

In 1738 the widow of Kantakuzen handed over Drabiv to the Czar's treasury. In 1775 Catherine II granted Drabiv into the eternal and hereditary possession of count Peter Zavadovsky. In 1843 Zavadovsky family sold Drabiv to Baryatynsky. In 1848 Drabiv was granted the status of a market town, it becomes the volost center with 4700 residents.

Until 18 July 2020, Drabiv served as an administrative center of Drabiv Raion. The raion was abolished in July 2020 as part of the administrative reform of Ukraine, which reduced the number of raions of Cherkasy Oblast to four. The area of Drabiv Raion was merged into Zolotonosha Raion.

Until 26 January 2024, Drabiv was designated urban-type settlement. On this day, a new law entered into force which abolished this status, and Drabiv became a rural settlement.

== Demographics ==
=== Population ===
In January 1989 the population was 7713 people.

In January 2013 the population was 6705 people.

=== Language ===
Distribution of the population by native language according to the 2001 census:

Language	Number	Percentage
Ukrainian	7 040	98.16%
Russian	120	1.67%
Other (Note: Those who did not indicate their native language or indicated a language that was native to less than 1% of the local population.)	12	0.17%
Total	7 172	100.00%

== Gallery ==
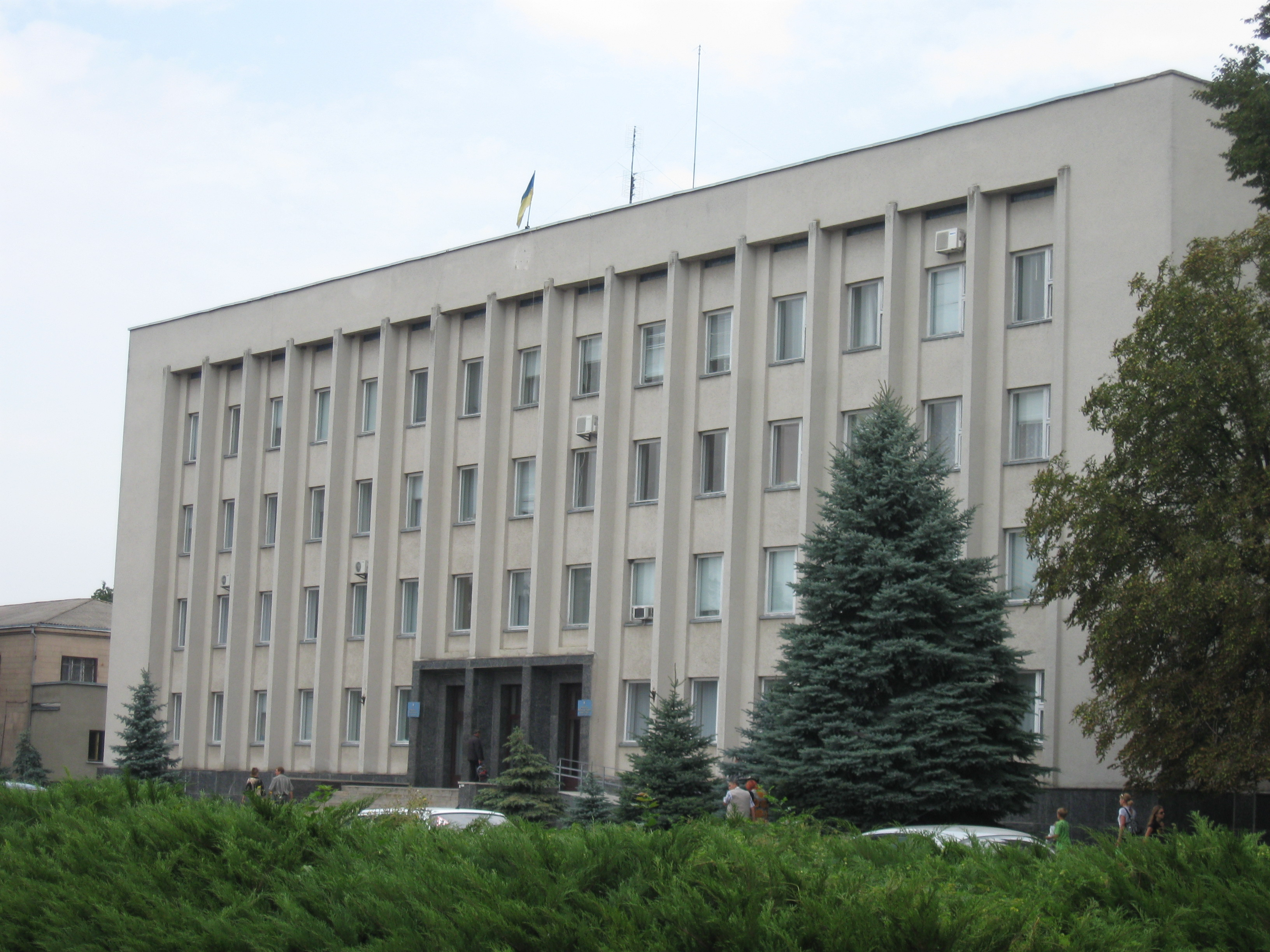
Drabiv Local Administration

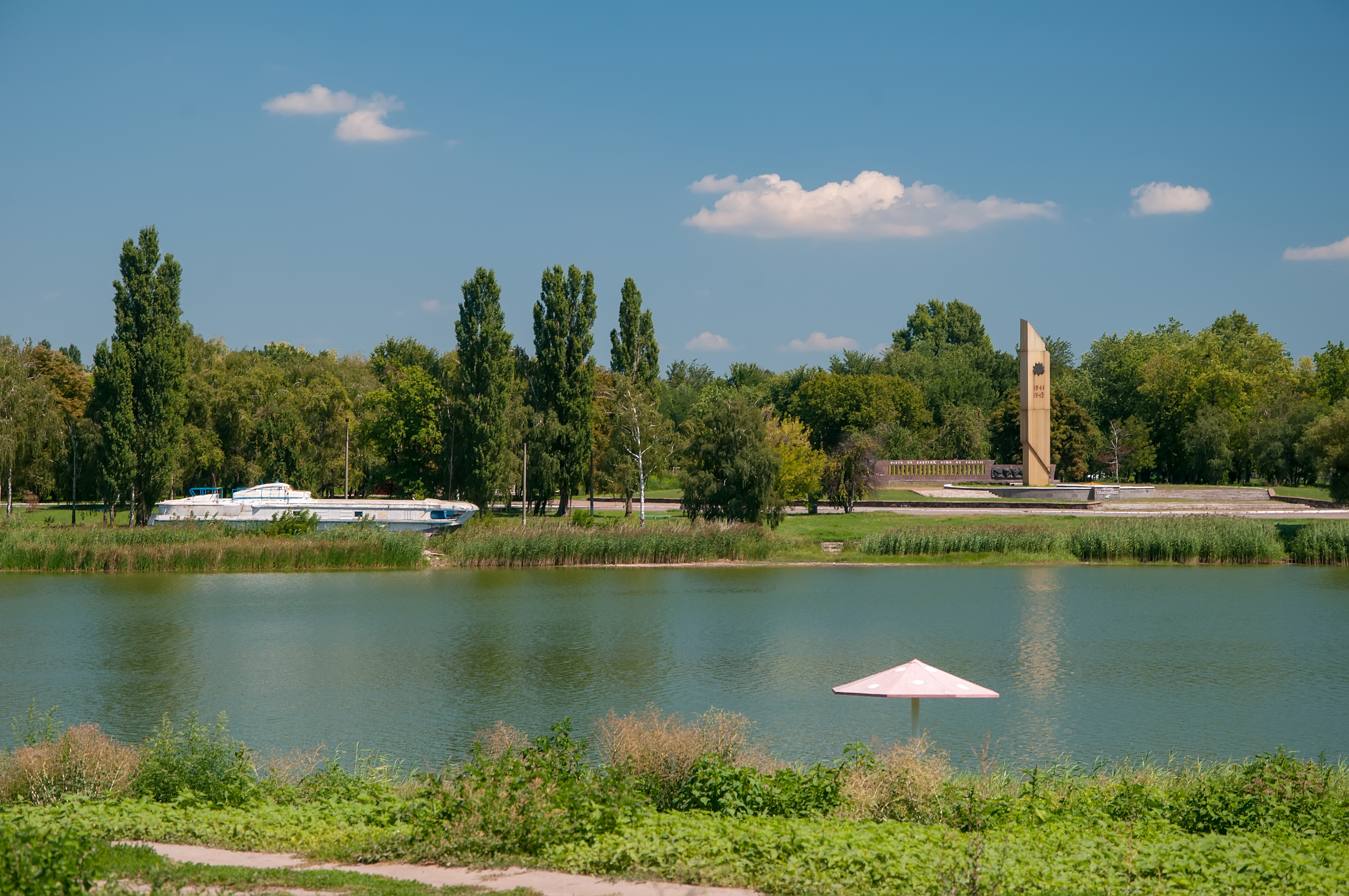
War memorial

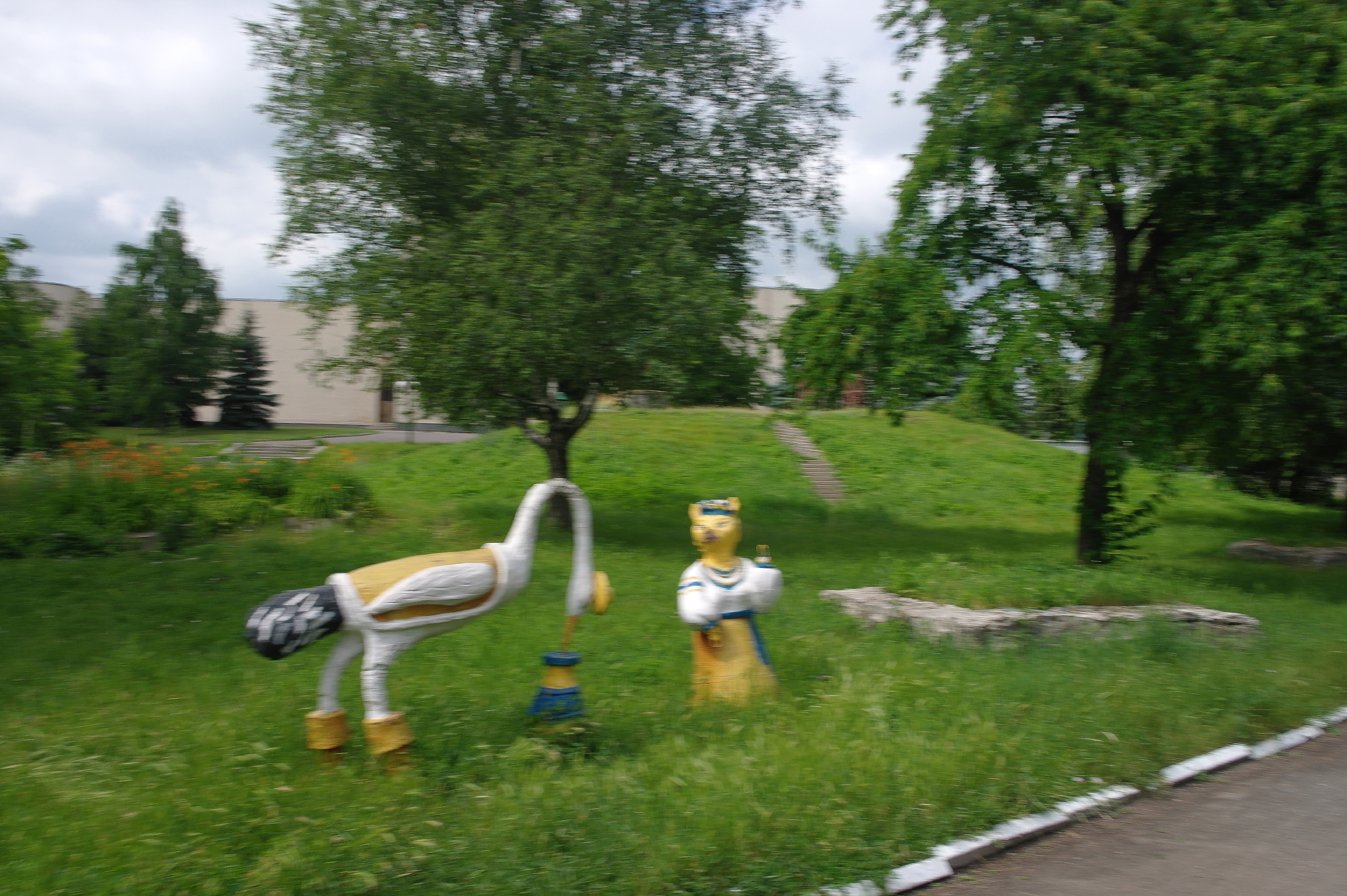
Drabiv local park

== Notable people ==
- Yevhen Novak (born 1989), Ukrainian footballer
- Oleh Synyohub (born 1989), Ukrainian footballer
