= Oleh Shelayev =

Ukrainian footballer (born 1976)

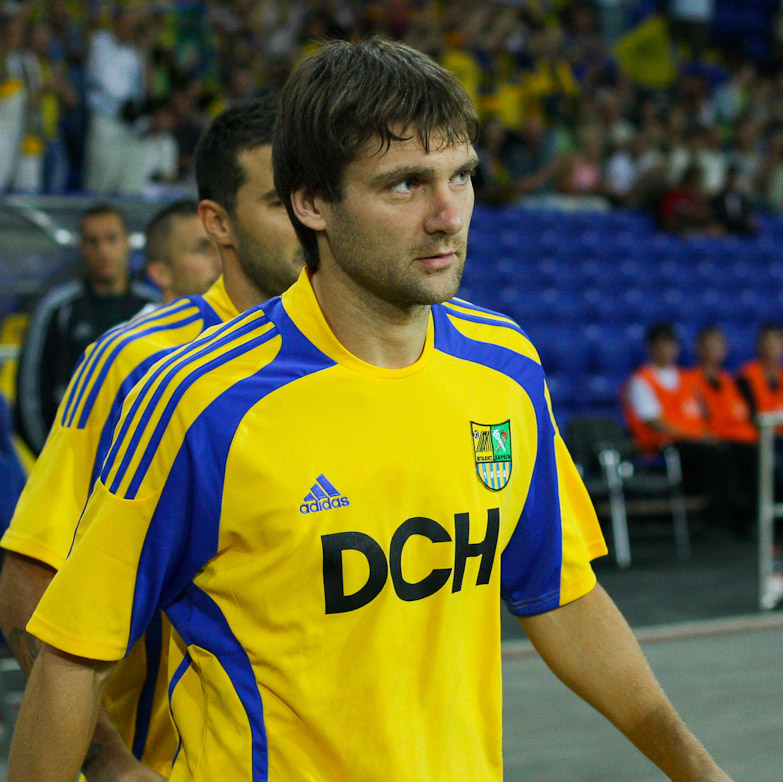
- in 2009 for Metalist Kharkiv

Personal information
- Full name: Oleh Mykolayovych Shelayev
- Date of birth: 5 November 1976 (age 49)
- Place of birth: Voroshylovhrad, Ukrainian SSR, USSR
- Height: 1.81 m (5 ft 11 1/2 in)
- Position: Defensive midfielder

Team information
- Current team: Kolos Kovalivka (assistant coach)

Youth career
- 1992–1993: SDYuShOR Zorya Luhansk

Senior career*
Years	Team	Apps	(Gls)
1993–1996	Zorya Luhansk	68	(1)
1996–2000	Shakhtar Donetsk	36	(3)
1996–1998	→ Shakhtar-2 Donetsk	32	(6)
1999	→ Dnipro Dnipropetrovsk (loan)	12	(2)
1999	→ Shakhtar-2 Donetsk	11	(0)
2000	→ Metalurh Donetsk (loan)	13	(3)
2000–2009	Dnipro Dnipropetrovsk	207	(24)
2001–2002	→ Dnipro-3 Dnipropetrovsk	2	(1)
2001–2003	→ Dnipro-2 Dnipropetrovsk	9	(3)
2009	→ Kryvbas Kryvyi Rih (loan)	8	(0)
2009–2014	Metalist Kharkiv	78	(1)
2015	VPK-Ahro Shevchenkivka	4	(0)
2017	Vovchansk	3	(1)
2018	Dnipro 1918	2	(0)
2019	Vovchansk	2	(0)
2021	Vovchansk	2	(0)

International career
2004–2007	Ukraine	36	(1)

Managerial career
- 2015–2019: Dnipro (academy)
- 2024–2025: Dnister Zalishchyky
- 2025–: Kolos Kovalivka (assistant)
- * Club domestic league appearances and goals

Oleh Mykolayovych Shelayev (Ukrainian: Олег Миколайович Шелаєв, born 5 November 1976) is a Ukrainian former footballer. He is among the top-3 most capped footballers of the Ukrainian Premier League. Currently he is an assistant coach of Ruslan Kostyshyn at Kolos Kovalivka.

== Club career ==
Shelayev plays in a defensive midfield position and was the captain of his club team, FC Dnipro Dnipropetrovsk. In December 2008 the club loaned him to FC Kryvbas Kryvyi Rih. At the end of the 2008–09 season he signed with FC Metalist Kharkiv.

On 4 January 2015 Shelayev became a sports director of the FC Dnipro Dnipropetrovsk Academy.

== International career ==
He was a member of the Ukraine national team until his retirement from international football in 2007. On 28 April 2004 Shelayev made his debut in home draw against Slovakia. He played in several games for Ukraine in the 2006 FIFA World Cup.

=== International goals ===
#	Date	Venue	Opponent	Score	Result	Competition
1.	8 September 2007	Boris Paichadze Stadium, Tbilisi	Georgia	0–1	1–1	UEFA Euro 2008 qualifying
