= Oleh Len =

Ukrainian footballer

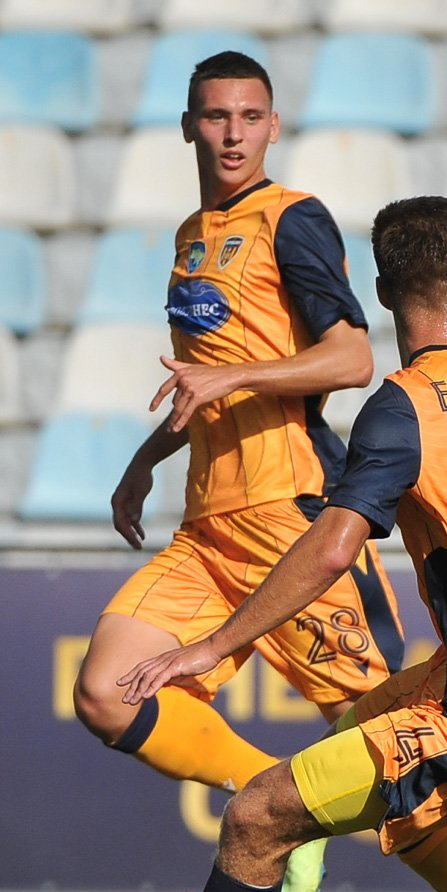

Personal information
- Full name: Oleh Vitaliyovych Len
- Date of birth: 7 April 2002 (age 24)
- Place of birth: Rava-Ruska, Ukraine
- Height: 1.89 m (6 ft 2 in)
- Position: Left-back

Team information
- Current team: Ahrobiznes Volochysk
- Number: 28

Youth career
- 2011–2015: Rava Rava-Ruska
- 2015–2019: Karpaty Lviv

Senior career*
| Years | Team | Apps | (Gls) |
| 2019–2020 | Karpaty Lviv | 0 | (0) |
| 2020–2022 | Rukh Lviv | 0 | (0) |
| 2021–2022 | → Prykarpattia Ivano-Frankivsk (loan) | 18 | (0) |
| 2022–2023 | Karpaty Lviv | 15 | (1) |
| 2023– | Ahrobiznes Volochysk | 74 | (3) |
- * Club domestic league appearances and goals as of 3 June 2026

Oleh Vitaliyovych Len (Ukrainian: Олег Віталійович Лень; born 7 April 2002) is a Ukrainian professional footballer who plays as a left-back for Ukrainian club Ahrobiznes Volochysk.
