= Vasyl Henyk =

Ukrainian footballer

Personal information
- Full name: Vasyl Mykolayovych Henyk
- Date of birth: 15 July 1998 (age 28)
- Place of birth: Ivano-Frankivsk, Ukraine
- Height: 1.83 m (6 ft 0 in)
- Position: Defensive midfielder

Team information
- Current team: Prykarpattia Ivano-Frankivsk
- Number: 34

Youth career
- 2011–2014: Prykarpattia Ivano-Frankivsk
- 2014–2015: Dynamo Kyiv

Senior career*
Years	Team	Apps	(Gls)
2015–2016	Nika Ivano-Frankivsk (amateurs)	20	(0)
2016–	Prykarpattia Ivano-Frankivsk	140	(1)
- * Club domestic league appearances and goals as of 4 June 2026

Vasyl Mykolayovych Henyk (Ukrainian: Василь Миколайович Геник; born 15 July 1998) is a Ukrainian professional footballer who plays as a defensive midfielder for Ukrainian club Prykarpattia Ivano-Frankivsk.
