= Vladyslav Buchakchyiskyi =

Ukrainian footballer (born 2003)

Personal information
- Full name: Vladyslav Olehovych Buchakchyiskyi
- Date of birth: 4 March 2003 (age 23)
- Place of birth: Pryazovske, Ukraine
- Height: 1.72 m (5 ft 8 in)
- Position: Central midfielder

Team information
- Current team: Prykarpattia Ivano-Frankivsk
- Number: 8

Youth career
- 2015: UFK-Karpaty Lviv
- 2016–2019: Skala Morshyn
- 2019–2020: VIK-Volyn Volodymyr-Volynskyi

Senior career*
Years	Team	Apps	(Gls)
2020–2024	Rukh Lviv	0	(0)
2022–2024	→ Prykarpattia Ivano-Frankivsk (loan)	35	(0)
2024–	Prykarpattia Ivano-Frankivsk	20	(2)
- * Club domestic league appearances and goals as of 10 June 2025

Vladyslav Olehovych Buchakchyiskyi (Ukrainian: Владислав Олегович Бучакчийський; born 4 March 2003) is a Ukrainian professional footballer who plays as a central midfielder for Ukrainian First League club Prykarpattia Ivano-Frankivsk.
