= Denys Rezepov =

Ukrainian footballer

Personal information
- Full name: Denys Serhiyovych Rezepov
- Date of birth: 11 February 2002 (age 24)
- Place of birth: Kharkiv, Ukraine
- Height: 1.86 m (6 ft 1 in)
- Position: Attacking midfielder

Team information
- Current team: Nyva Ternopil
- Number: 91

Youth career
- 2014–2015: KhTZ Kharkiv
- 2015–2016: DYuSSh Lyubotyn
- 2016–2018: Metalist Kharkiv
- 2018–2019: Metalist 1925 Kharkiv
- 2019: Avanhard Kharkiv

Senior career*
| Years | Team | Apps | (Gls) |
| 2020 | MSM Academy Prague | | |
| 2020 | Avanhard Kharkiv (amateurs) | 2 | (1) |
| 2020–2022 | Metalist 1925 Kharkiv | 2 | (0) |
| 2021–2022 | → Vovchansk (loan) | 16 | (1) |
| 2022–2024 | Inhulets Petrove | 49 | (2) |
| 2025– | Nyva Ternopil | 36 | (3) |
- * Club domestic league appearances and goals as of 4 June 2026

Denys Serhiyovych Rezepov (Ukrainian: Денис Сергійович Резепов; born 11 February 2002) is a Ukrainian professional footballer who plays as an attacking midfielder for Ukrainian First League club Nyva Ternopil.
