= Vladyslav Chushenko =

Ukrainian footballer

Personal information
- Full name: Vladyslav Serhiyovych Chushenko
- Date of birth: 27 October 2000 (age 26)
- Place of birth: Kyiv, Ukraine
- Height: 1.80 m (5 ft 11 in)
- Position: Left-back

Team information
- Current team: Prykarpattia-Blago
- Number: 27

Youth career
- 2009–2010: Arsenal Kyiv
- 2010–2013: CSKA Kyiv
- 2013–2015: Arsenal Kyiv
- 2015: CSKA Kyiv
- 2015–2019: Kolos Kovalivka

Senior career*
Years	Team	Apps	(Gls)
2019–2020	Kolos Kovalivka	0	(0)
2020–2023	Mynai	1	(0)
2021–2022	→ Uzhhorod (loan)	15	(0)
2022–2023	→ Mariupol (loan)	18	(0)
2023–2025	Podillya Khmelnytskyi	30	(0)
2025–	Prykarpattia-Blaho	26	(2)
- * Club domestic league appearances and goals as of 4 June 2026

Vladyslav Serhiyovych Chushenko (Ukrainian: Владислав Сергійович Чушенко; born 27 October 2000) is a Ukrainian professional footballer who plays as a left-back for Prykarpattia-Blago.

== Career ==
Born in Kyiv, Chushenko is a product of the local Arsenal Kyiv, CSKA Kyiv and Kolos Kovalivka youth sportive school systems.

He played for FC Kolos Kovalivka in the Ukrainian Premier League Reserves and was released in September 2020, when signed a contract with FC Mynai in the Ukrainian Premier League. Chushenko made his debut in the Ukrainian Premier League for Mynai on 9 May 2021, playing as the second half-time substituted player in a losing home match against FC Vorskla Poltava.
