= Serhiy Shvets (footballer) =

Ukrainian footballer

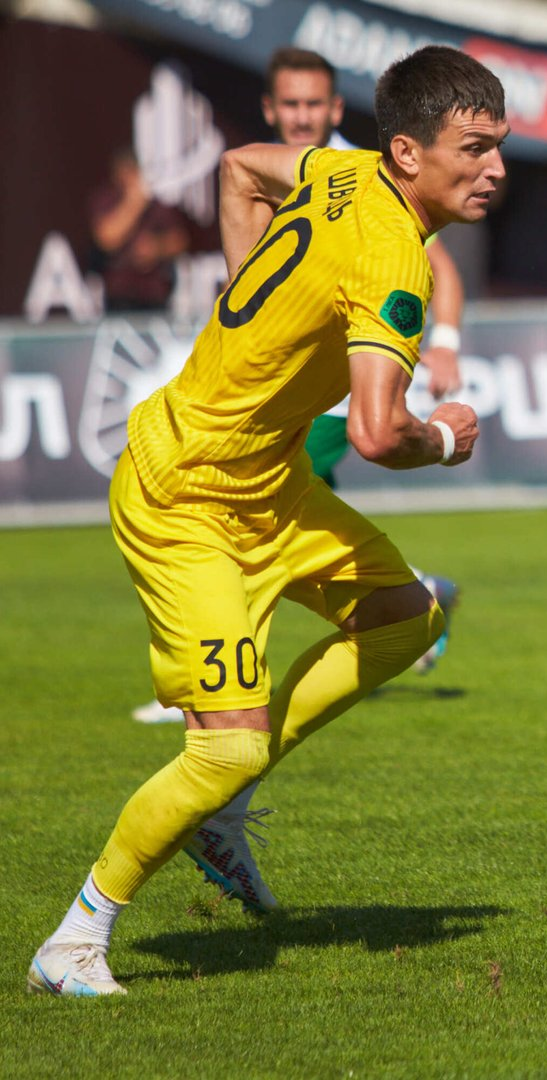

Personal information
- Full name: Serhiy Serhiyovych Shvets
- Date of birth: 10 May 1992 (age 34)
- Place of birth: Savran, Ukraine
- Height: 1.87 m (6 ft 2 in)
- Position: Centre-back

Team information
- Current team: Prykarpattia-Blaho
- Number: 30

Youth career
- 2007–2008: Dynamo Kyiv
- 2008–2009: RVUFK Kyiv

Senior career*
Years	Team	Apps	(Gls)
2012	Denys-Farm Savran	0	(0)
2015–2016	Zhemchuzhyna Odesa	20	(1)
2016–2017	Real Pharma Odesa	4	(0)
2017	Sudnobudivnyk Mykolaiv	12	(0)
2017–2019	Podillya Khmelnytskyi	50	(2)
2019–2022	Polissya Zhytomyr	48	(4)
2022	Kramatorsk	0	(0)
2022–2023	LNZ Cherkasy	6	(0)
2023–	Prykarpattia-Blaho	80	(4)
- * Club domestic league appearances and goals as of 4 June 2026

Serhiy Serhiyovych Shvets (Ukrainian: Сергій Сергійович Швець; born 10 May 1992) is a Ukrainian professional footballer who plays as a centre-back for Prykarpattia-Blaho.

== Career ==
In summer 2022 he moved to LNZ Cherkasy.

In January 2023 he moved to Prykarpattia Ivano-Frankivsk.
