= Arsen Slotyuk =

Ukrainian footballer

Personal information
- Full name: Arsen Borysovych Slotyuk
- Date of birth: 28 December 1993 (age 32)
- Place of birth: Ternopil, Ukraine
- Height: 1.92 m (6 ft 4 in)
- Position: Centre-back

Team information
- Current team: Nyva Ternopil
- Number: 23

Senior career*
Years	Team	Apps	(Gls)
2010	Topilche	3	(0)
2011–2013	Lanivtsi	0	(0)
2014	Polonne	9	(0)
2015	Sluch Starokostyantyniv	14	(6)
2016–2022	Ahrobiznes Volochysk	151	(11)
2022	→ Kotwica Kołobrzeg (loan)	6	(0)
2022–2023	LNZ Cherkasy	0	(0)
2023–2024	Livyi Bereh Kyiv	27	(2)
2024–	Nyva Ternopil	22	(0)
- * Club domestic league appearances and goals as of 10 June 2025

Arsen Borysovych Slotyuk (Ukrainian: Арсен Борисович Слотюк; born 28 December 1993) is a Ukrainian professional footballer who plays as a centre-back for Ukrainian side Nyva Ternopil.

== Career ==
On 19 July 2022, he moved to LNZ Cherkasy.

== Honours ==
Kotwica Kołobrzeg

- III liga, group II: 2021–22
