= Amar Kvakić =

Bosnian footballer (born 2002)

Personal information
- Date of birth: 30 October 2002 (age 24)
- Place of birth: Graz, Austria
- Height: 1.91 m (6 ft 3 in)
- Position: Centre-back

Youth career
- 2008–2011: SC Seiersberg
- 2011–2017: Grazer AK
- 2017–2019: Kapfenberger SV

Senior career*
| Years | Team | Apps | (Gls) |
| 2019–2021 | Kapfenberger SV | 41 | (1) |
| 2021–2022 | Metalist 1925 Kharkiv | 1 | (0) |
| 2022 | → Floridsdorfer AC (loan) | 2 | (0) |
| 2022–2023 | Velež Mostar | 13 | (0) |
| 2023–2024 | FC U Craiova | 6 | (0) |

International career
| 2019 | Bosnia and Herzegovina U17 | 7 | (0) |
| 2019 | Bosnia and Herzegovina U18 | 4 | (0) |
| 2019 | Bosnia and Herzegovina U19 | 5 | (1) |
- * Club domestic league appearances and goals as of 6 December 2024

Amar Kvakić (Bosnian pronunciation: [ǎmaːr kʋǎkitɕ]; born 30 October 2002) is a professional footballer who plays as a centre-back. Born in Austria, he has represented Bosnia and Herzegovina at various youth levels.

== Club career ==
=== Early career ===
Kvakić started playing football at a local club, before joining youth setup of his hometown club GAK in 2011. In 2017, he moved to youth academy of Kapfenberger SV. He made his professional debut against Horn on 29 May 2019 at the age of 16. On 26 October 2020, he scored his first professional goal against Austria Klagenfurt.

In July 2021, Kvakić switched to Ukrainian club Metalist 1925 Kharkiv. On 31 January 2022, he was loaned to Floridsdorfer AC in Austria.

On 30 June 2023, it was announced that Kvakić had signed with Romanian side FC U Craiova 1948, on a one-year contract, with an option to extend for another three seasons.

== International career ==
Kvakić represented Bosnia and Herzegovina at various youth levels.

== Career statistics ==
=== Club ===
As of 27 October 2024

Appearances and goals by club, season and competition
| Club | Season | League | | | Cup | | Continental | | Total | |
| Club | Season | Division | Apps | Goals | Apps | Goals | Apps | Goals | Apps | Goals |
|---|---|---|---|---|---|---|---|---|---|---|
| Kapfenberger SV | 2018–19 | 2. Liga | 2 | 0 | – | | – | | 2 | 0 |
| Kapfenberger SV | 2019–20 | 2. Liga | 15 | 0 | 0 | 0 | – | | 15 | 0 |
| Kapfenberger SV | 2020–21 | 2. Liga | 24 | 1 | 4 | 0 | – | | 28 | 1 |
| Kapfenberger SV | Total | | 41 | 1 | 4 | 0 | – | | 45 | 1 |
| Metalist 1925 Kharkiv | 2021–22 | Ukrainian Premier League | 1 | 0 | 1 | 0 | – | | 2 | 0 |
| Floridsdorfer AC (loan) | 2021–22 | 2. Liga | 2 | 0 | – | | – | | 2 | 0 |
| Velež Mostar | 2022–23 | Premier League of Bosnia and Herzegovina | 13 | 0 | 0 | 0 | – | | 13 | 0 |
| FC U Craiova | 2023–24 | Liga I | 4 | 0 | 1 | 0 | – | | 5 | 0 |
| FC U Craiova | 2024–25 | Liga II | 2 | 0 | 1 | 0 | – | | 3 | 0 |
| FC U Craiova | Total | | 6 | 0 | 2 | 0 | – | | 8 | 0 |
| Career total | | | 63 | 1 | 7 | 0 | – | | 70 | 1 |
