= Serhiy Kosovskyi =

Ukrainian footballer

Personal information
- Full name: Serhiy Vitaliyovych Kosovskyi
- Date of birth: 19 May 1998 (age 28)
- Place of birth: Kyiv, Ukraine
- Height: 1.78 m (5 ft 10 in)
- Position: Midfielder

Team information
- Current team: Livyi Bereh Kyiv
- Number: 25

Youth career
- 2010–2015: Dynamo Kyiv

Senior career*
Years	Team	Apps	(Gls)
2017–2018	Vorskla Poltava	1	(0)
2018–2019	Obolon-Brovar Kyiv	11	(0)
2019	Slávia TU Košice	16	(7)
2020–2021	Ahrobiznes Volochysk	23	(0)
2021–2022	VPK-Ahro Shevchenkivka	17	(1)
2022–2024	Obolon Kyiv	31	(0)
2024–	Livyi Bereh Kyiv	39	(1)

International career
2013–2014	Ukraine U16	10	(1)
2014–2015	Ukraine U17	9	(0)
- * Club domestic league appearances and goals as of 3 June 2026

Serhiy Kosovskyi (Ukrainian: Сергій Віталійович Косовський; born 19 May 1998) is a Ukrainian professional footballer who plays as a midfielder for Livyi Bereh Kyiv.

== Career ==
Kosovskyi is a product of Dynamo Kyiv from his native city.

In 2016 he signed with Vorskla Poltava and played in the Ukrainian Premier League Reserves. In April 2017 he was promoted to the senior squad team of Vorskla in the Ukrainian Premier League. He made his league debut as a substitute against Volyn Lutsk on 5 May 2017.

== Personal life ==
Kosovskyi is a son of the retired Ukrainian international footballer Vitaliy Kosovskyi.
