= Artem Vovkun =

Ukrainian footballer

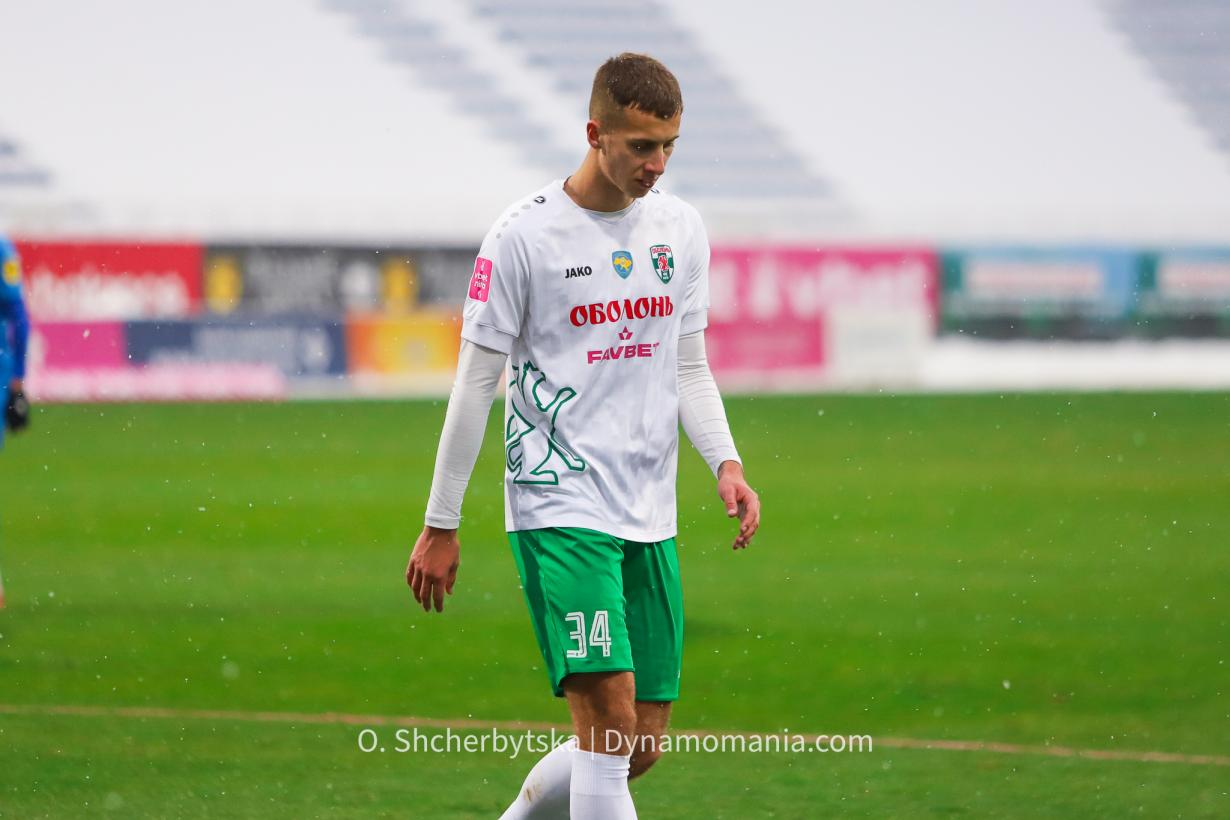
- Vovkun playing for Obolon in 2023

Personal information
- Full name: Artem Andriyovych Vovkun
- Date of birth: 7 September 2001 (age 25)
- Place of birth: Lviv, Ukraine
- Height: 1.91 m (6 ft 3 in)
- Position: Centre-back

Team information
- Current team: FSC Mariupol
- Number: 6

Youth career
- 2011–2012: Karpaty 2001 Lviv
- 2012–2013: Poshuk Lviv
- 2013–2014: Opir Lviv
- 2014–2020: Lviv
- 2020: Zemplín Michalovce

Senior career*
Years	Team	Apps	(Gls)
2020–2021	Zemplín Michalovce	8	(0)
2021–2022	Munkach Mukachevo	4	(0)
2022–2023	Lviv	20	(0)
2023–2024	Obolon Kyiv	9	(0)
2024	Dinaz Vyshhorod	10	(0)
2025–	FSC Mariupol	8	(0)
- * Club domestic league appearances and goals as of 10 June 2025

Artem Andriyovych Vovkun (Ukrainian: Артем Андрійович Вовкун; born 7 September 2001) is a Ukrainian professional footballer who currently plays for FSC Mariupol as a defender.

== Club career ==
=== MFK Zemplín Michalovce ===
Vovkun made his Fortuna Liga debut for Zemplín Michalovce against Spartak Trnava on 8 August 2020.
