= Vasyl Frantsuz =

Ukrainian footballer

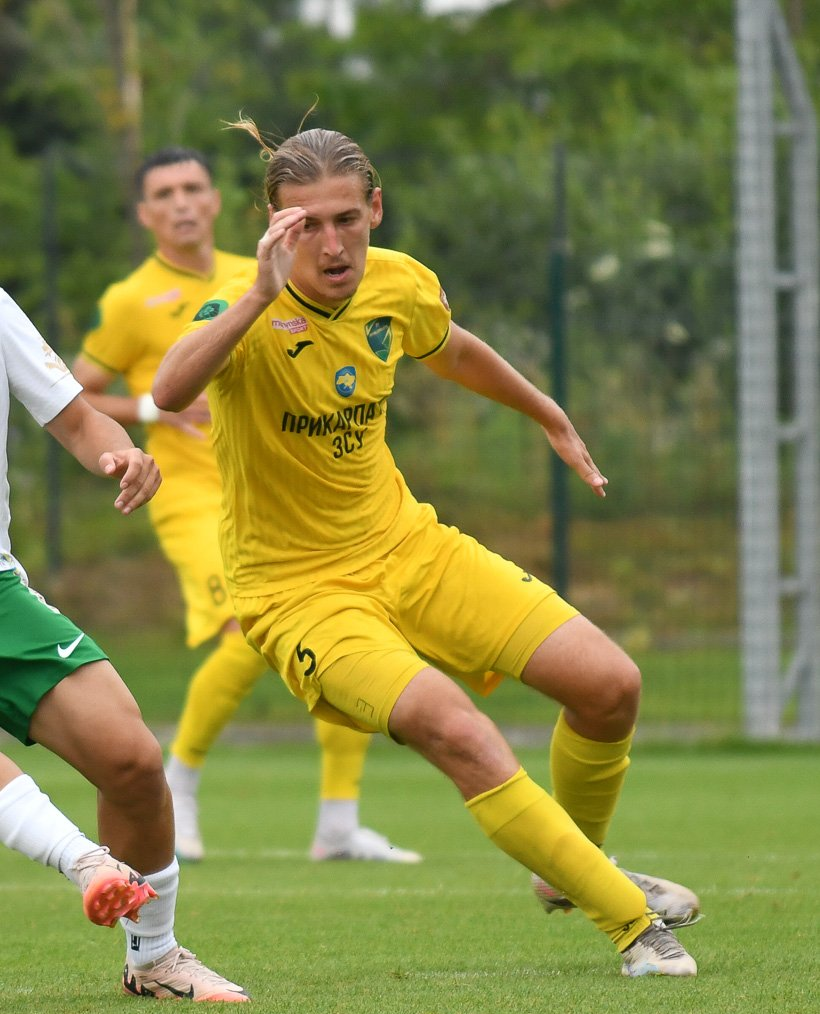

Personal information
- Full name: Vasyl Pavlovych Frantsuz
- Date of birth: 12 January 1996 (age 30)
- Place of birth: Ivano-Frankivsk, Ukraine
- Height: 1.91 m (6 ft 3 in)
- Position: Centre-back

Team information
- Current team: Prykarpattia Ivano-Frankivsk
- Number: 3

Youth career
- 2009–2011: Prykarpattia Ivano-Frankivsk
- 2012: Karpaty Halych
- 2012–2013: Prykarpattia Ivano-Frankivsk
- 2013: Karpaty Yaremche

Senior career*
Years	Team	Apps	(Gls)
2013	Karpaty Yaremche (amateurs)	3	(0)
2014	Blaho Ivano-Frankivsk (amateurs)	17	(2)
2015–2016	Prydnistrovya Tlumach (amateurs)	36	(8)
2016–	Prykarpattia Ivano-Frankivsk	177	(17)
- * Club domestic league appearances and goals as of 4 June 2026

Vasyl Pavlovych Frantsuz (Ukrainian: Василь Павлович Француз; born 12 January 1996) is a Ukrainian professional footballer who plays as a centre-back for Ukrainian club Prykarpattia Ivano-Frankivsk.
