= Stanislav Demkiv =

Ukrainian footballer

Personal information
- Full name: Stanislav Bohdanovych Demkiv
- Date of birth: 10 May 2000 (age 26)
- Place of birth: Ivano-Frankivsk, Ukraine
- Height: 1.80 m (5 ft 11 in)
- Position: Midfielder

Team information
- Current team: Prykarpattia Ivano-Frankivsk
- Number: 23

Youth career
- 2011–2012: Youth Sportive School Zhydachiv
- 2015–2017: UFK Lviv

Senior career*
Years	Team	Apps	(Gls)
2017–2018	Veres Rivne	0	(0)
2018–2022	Lviv	0	(0)
2021–2022	→ Vovchansk (loan)	14	(2)
2022–	Prykarpattia Ivano-Frankivsk	67	(1)
- * Club domestic league appearances and goals as of 4 June 2026

Stanislav Bohdanovych Demkiv (Ukrainian: Станіслав Богданович Демків; born 10 May 2000) is a professional Ukrainian footballer who plays as a midfielder for Prykarpattia Ivano-Frankivsk.

== Career ==
Born in Ivano-Frankivsk, Demkiv is a product of the Youth Sportive School from Zhydachiv and UFK Lviv (first trainer Oleh Kolobych) youth sportive school system.

He played for FC Veres and FC Lviv in the Ukrainian Premier League Reserves and in July 2021 Demkiv was went on loan to the Ukrainian First League FC Vovchansk.
