= Mykyta Yakubenko =

Ukrainian footballer

Personal information
- Full name: Mykyta Oleksandrovych Yakubenko
- Date of birth: 15 October 2000 (age 26)
- Place of birth: Donetsk, Ukraine
- Height: 1.84 m (6 ft 0 in)
- Position: Goalkeeper

Team information
- Current team: Mariupol
- Number: 12

Youth career
- 2013–2014: Olimpik-UOR Donetsk
- 2014–2015: Olimpiya-Azovstal Mariupol
- 2015–2017: Mykolaiv
- 2018–2019: Avanhard Kramatorsk

Senior career*
Years	Team	Apps	(Gls)
2019–2022	Kramatorsk	9	(0)
2019	→ Avanhard-2 Kramatorsk	9	(0)
2022–	Mariupol	12	(0)
- * Club domestic league appearances and goals as of 10 June 2025

Mykyta Oleksandrovych Yakubenko (Ukrainian: Микита Олександрович Якубенко; born 15 October 2000) is a Ukrainian professional footballer who plays as a goalkeeper for Ukrainian club Mariupol.
