= Bohdan Chuyev =

Ukrainian footballer

Personal information
- Full name: Bohdan Yanovych Chuyev
- Date of birth: 23 February 2000 (age 26)
- Place of birth: Zaporizhzhia, Ukraine
- Height: 1.84 m (6 ft 0 in)
- Position: Defender

Team information
- Current team: Livyi Bereh Kyiv
- Number: 4

Youth career
- 2011–2013: Metalurh Zaporizhzhia
- 2013–2017: Dynamo Kyiv

Senior career*
Years	Team	Apps	(Gls)
2017–2018	Dynamo Kyiv	0	(0)
2019–2022	Vorskla Poltava	1	(0)
2021–2022	→ Hirnyk-Sport Horishni Plavni (loan)	31	(0)
2022–2025	Mynai	52	(0)
2025–	Livyi Bereh Kyiv	5	(0)

International career^{‡}
2016	Ukraine U17	3	(0)
2018	Ukraine U18	1	(0)
- * Club domestic league appearances and goals as of 24 December 2025 ‡ National team caps and goals as of 16 August 2021

Bohdan Chuyev (Ukrainian: Богдан Янович Чуєв; born 23 February 2000) is a Ukrainian professional footballer who plays as a defender for Livyi Bereh Kyiv.

== Career ==
Born in Zaporizhzhia, Chuyev is a product of local Metalurh Zaporizhzhia and Dynamo Kyiv youth sportive school systems.

In March 2019 he was signed by Vorskla Poltava. He made his debut as a second half-time substituted player for Vorskla Poltava in the Ukrainian Premier League in a home losing match against FC Mariupol on 16 July 2020.
