= Baryatinsky =

Baryatinsky (masculine), Baryatinskaya (feminine), or Baryatinskoye (neuter) may refer to:

- Baryatinsky District, a district of Kaluga Oblast, Russia
- Baryatinsky family, a princely family of Rurikid stock:
  - Aleksandr Ivanovich Baryatinsky (1815–1879), Russian General and Field Marshal (from 1859), Prince, governor of the Caucasus
  - Alexander Vladimirovich Baryatinsky (1870–1910)
  - Anna Baryatinskaya
  - Ekaterina Feodorovna Baryatinskaya-Dolgorukova
  - Leonilla Bariatinskaya, Russian princess
  - Yury Baryatinsky (died 1685), Russian knyaz, boyar, and voyevoda
