= Daniel Ehbudzhuo =

Ukrainian footballer

Personal information
- Full name: Daniel Oskar Ehbudzhuo
- Date of birth: 4 January 2002 (age 24)
- Place of birth: Kurylivka, Ukraine
- Height: 1.79 m (5 ft 10 in)
- Position: Right-back

Team information
- Current team: Arminia Hannover

Youth career
- 2013–2017: Metalist Kharkiv
- 2017–2019: Shakhtar Donetsk

Senior career*
Years	Team	Apps	(Gls)
2019–2022	Shakhtar Donetsk	0	(0)
2021–2022	→ Vovchansk (loan)	9	(0)
2024–	Arminia Hannover	0	(0)

International career^{‡}
2017–2018	Ukraine U16	9	(0)
2018–2019	Ukraine U17	11	(0)
- * Club domestic league appearances and goals as of 13 February 2024 ‡ National team caps and goals as of 24 June 2023

Daniel Oskar Ehbudzhuo (Ukrainian: Даніель Оскар Егбуджуо; born 4 January 2002) is a Ukrainian professional footballer who plays as a right-back for Arminia Hannover.

== Career ==
Born in Kurylivka, Kupiansk Raion, Ehbudzhuo began his career in the neighbouring Metalist Kharkiv and after continued in the Shakhtar Donetsk academy.

He played in the Ukrainian Premier League Reserves and never made his debut for the senior Shakhtar Donetsk's squad. In July 2021 Ehbudzhuo signed a year loan contract with the Ukrainian Second League's side Vovchansk and made the debut for this team as a start-squad player in a home draw against Metalurh Zaporizhzhia on 25 July 2021.
