= Bohdan Khoma =

Ukrainian footballer

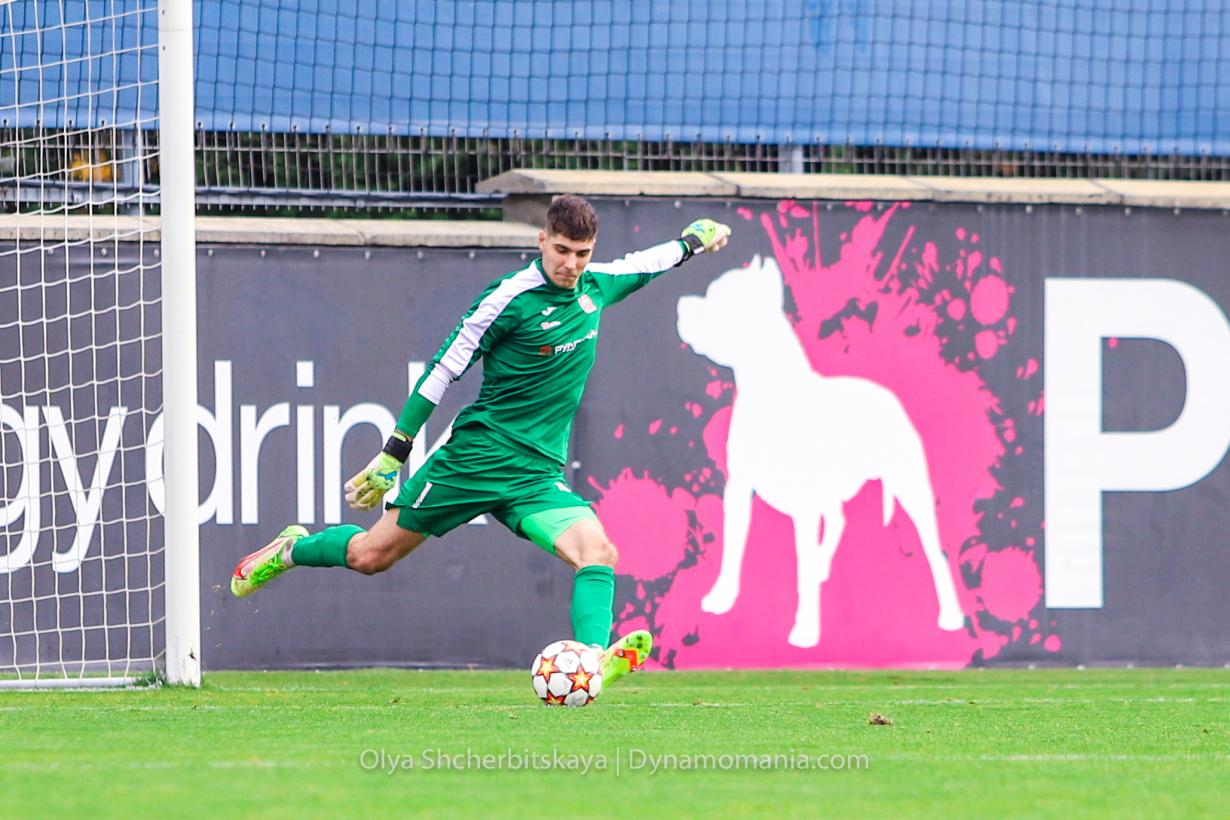

Personal information
- Full name: Bohdan Arturovych Khoma
- Date of birth: 2 April 2003 (age 23)
- Place of birth: Dnipropetrovsk, Ukraine
- Height: 1.96 m (6 ft 5 in)
- Position: Goalkeeper

Team information
- Current team: Kryvbas Kryvyi Rih
- Number: 1

Youth career
- 2016–2019: Dnipro

Senior career*
Years	Team	Apps	(Gls)
2019–2022	Dnipro-1	0	(0)
2021–2022	→ Nikopol (loan)	2	(0)
2022–	Kryvbas Kryvyi Rih	1	(0)

International career^{‡}
2018	Ukraine U16	1	(0)
- * Club domestic league appearances and goals as of 20 June 2024 ‡ National team caps and goals as of 25 November 2023

Bohdan Arturovych Khoma (Ukrainian: Богдан Артурович Хома; born 2 April 2003) is a Ukrainian professional footballer who plays as a goalkeeper for Kryvbas Kryvyi Rih.

== Career ==
On 25 July 2022 he signed for Kryvbas Kryvyi Rih in Ukrainian Premier League.
