= Oleh Synyohub =

Ukrainian footballer

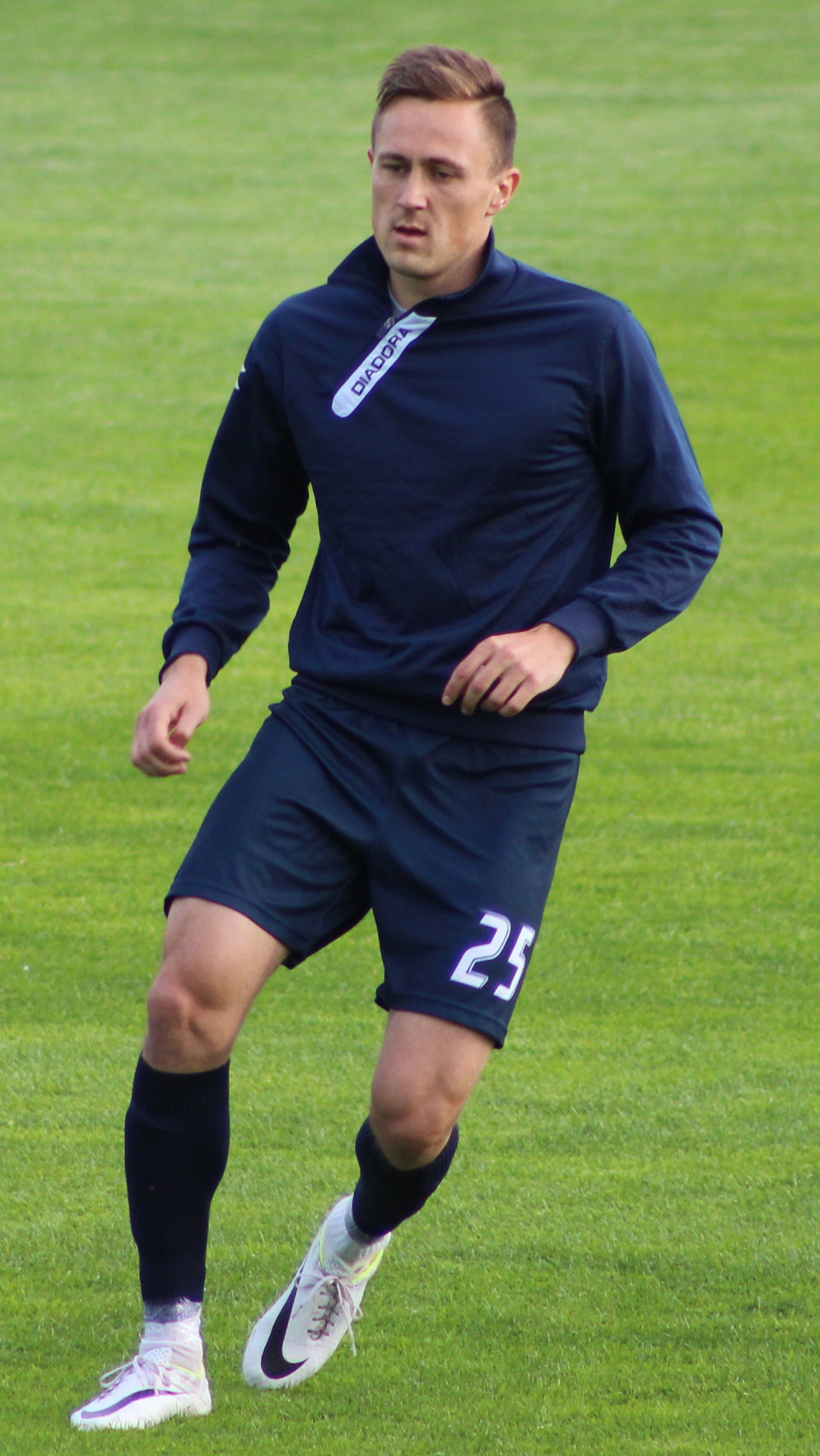
- Oleg Synyogub - football midfielder

Personal information
- Full name: Oleh Anatoliyovych Synyohub
- Date of birth: 19 April 1989 (age 37)
- Place of birth: Drabiv, Soviet Union (now Ukraine)
- Height: 1.80 m (5 ft 11 in)
- Position: Midfielder

Youth career
- 2002–2003: Lokomotyv Kyiv
- 2003–2004: Vidradnyi Kyiv
- 2004–2006: UOR Donetsk

Senior career*
Years	Team	Apps	(Gls)
2008–2009	Dnipro Cherkasy	26	(2)
2009	Arsenal Bila Tserkva	11	(0)
2010	Yednist Plysky	20	(1)
2011–2012	Poltava	27	(5)
2012–2013	→ Poltava-2 Karlivka	29	(1)
2014–2017	Cherkaskyi Dnipro	88	(1)
2017–2021	Inhulets Petrove	72	(1)
2017	→ Inhulets-2 Petrove	2	(0)
2021–2022	Mynai	15	(0)
2022–2023	LNZ Cherkasy	11	(0)
2023–2026	UCSA Tarasivka	41	(3)
Total		342	(14)
- * Club domestic league appearances and goals

Oleh Anatoliyovych Synyohub (Ukrainian: Олег Анатолійович Синьогуб; born 19 April 1989) is a former Ukrainian professional footballer who played as a midfielder.

He is product of several youth clubs from Kyiv and Donetsk. Synyohub made his debut at senior level for FC Dnipro Cherkasy at the Ukrainian First League in 2008. He joined FC Inhulets Petrove in 2017 after leaving FC Cherkaskyi Dnipro.

On 12 July 2022, he moved to LNZ Cherkasy.
