= Bohdan Dukhota =

Ukrainian footballer (born 2001)

Personal information
- Full name: Bohdan Andriyovych Dukhota
- Date of birth: 18 August 2001 (age 25)
- Place of birth: Stari Petrivtsi, Kyiv Oblast, Ukraine
- Height: 1.82 m (6 ft 0 in)
- Position: Right midfielder

Team information
- Current team: Dinaz Vyshhorod
- Number: 22

Youth career
- 2013–2014: Dinaz Vyshhorod
- 2014–2017: Dynamo Kyiv
- 2017–2018: Shakhtar Donetsk

Senior career*
Years	Team	Apps	(Gls)
2018–2020	Shakhtar Donetsk	0	(0)
2020–2022	Kolos Kovalivka	0	(0)
2021–2022	→ Dinaz Vyshhorod (loan)	23	(0)
2023–2024	Bukovyna Chernivtsi	20	(1)
2024	Chaika	7	(0)
2025–	Dinaz Vyshhorod	4	(1)

International career^{‡}
2016	Ukraine U16	2	(0)
2019	Ukraine U18	1	(0)
- * Club domestic league appearances and goals as of 20 June 2025 ‡ National team caps and goals as of 1 August 2023

Bohdan Andriyovych Dukhota (Ukrainian: Богдан Андрійович Духота; born 18 August 2001) is a Ukrainian professional footballer who plays as a right midfielder for Ukrainian First League club Dinaz Vyshhorod.
