= Artem Shulyanskyi =

Ukrainian footballer (born 2001)

Personal information
- Full name: Artem Kostyantynovych Shulyanskyi
- Date of birth: 11 April 2001 (age 25)
- Place of birth: Kyiv, Ukraine
- Height: 1.73 m (5 ft 8 in)
- Position: Left winger

Team information
- Current team: Oleksandriya
- Number: 11

Youth career
- 2013–2015: Arsenal Kyiv
- 2015–2018: Dynamo Kyiv

Senior career*
| Years | Team | Apps | (Gls) |
| 2018–2022 | Dynamo Kyiv | 0 | (0) |
| 2022–26 | Oleksandriya | 57 | (6) |
| 2025- | FC Oleksandriya-2 | 6 | (0) |
| 2026- | FC Obolon Kyiv | 5 | (0) |

International career^{‡}
| 2016 | Ukraine U15 | 2 | (1) |
| 2016–2017 | Ukraine U16 | 11 | (2) |
| 2017–2018 | Ukraine U17 | 20 | (5) |
| 2019 | Ukraine U18 | 2 | (0) |
| 2019 | Ukraine U19 | 4 | (1) |
| 2024 | Ukraine U23 | 2 | (0) |
- * Club domestic league appearances and goals as of 3 June 2026 ‡ National team caps and goals as of 30 July 2024

Artem Kostyantynovych Shulyanskyi (Ukrainian: Артем Костянтинович Шулянський; born 11 April 2001) is a Ukrainian professional footballer who plays as a left winger for Ukrainian Premier League club Oleksandriya.
