= FC Vovchansk =

Vovchansk
- Full name: FC Vovchansk
- Founded: 1992
- Ground: Stadion Ahrehatnoho Zavodu, Vovchansk; Stadion Sonyachny, Kharkiv
- Chairman: Vitaliy Panov
- Head coach: Andriy Berezovchuk
- League: Ukrainian Second League
- 2020–21: Ukrainian Amateur League, Group 3, 2nd of 12 (promoted)
- Website: http://fcvolchansk.com/
Home colours	Away colours

FC Vovchansk (Ukrainian: Футбольний клуб «Вовчанськ») is a Ukrainian football club from Vovchansk. The club represents a local machine-building and equipment factory. Vovchansk is a Ukrainian adaption and official name of the city where the club is from, while the club calls itself only in Russian manner Volchansk. In June 2021, the club was admitted to the Second League, yet still in March no such plans existed.

On 21 June 2023 the 31st PFL Conference excluded several clubs that did not compete in the 2022–23 season and did not renew their membership.

== History ==
The club was created in 1992. It was not until 1996 when the club made to top flight of the Kharkiv Oblast football championship (regional level). Its first notable achievement came in 2003 when Vovchansk became the 3rd place runner-up of regional competition. Yet it was only since 2017 that the club became a real contender for the regional title and started to participate in the national amateur competitions. In 2019–20 and 2020–21 AAFU championships it placed 2nd in the Group 3 and qualifying for the AAFU main league's title. During the 2020–21 season for some time Vovchansk was a group leader, but at finish yielded to Motor Zaporizhia of Chantsev. During this time the club's main team was managed by Andriy Berezovchuk who also performed functions of sports director in both Vovchansk and Metal Kharkiv. In 2021 Berezovchuk officially left the post of sports director in Metal that later transformed into Metalist.

== Honours ==
- Ukrainian Amateur Cup
  - Runners-up (1): 2018–19
- Kharkiv Oblast Championship
  - Winner (2): 2018, 2019
  - Runners-up (1): 2017
- Kharkiv Oblast Cup
  - Runners-up (2): 2004, 2017

== Current squad ==
As of 14 October 2022

Note: Flags indicate national team as defined under FIFA eligibility rules; some limited exceptions apply. Players may hold more than one non-FIFA nationality.

No.	Pos.	Nation	Player
5	MF	UKR	Stanislav Demkiv (on loan from Lviv)
6	MF	UKR	Oleh Shelayev
10	MF	BRA	Luan Borges
14	MF	UKR	Dmytro Batusov
16	MF	UKR	Serhiy Kostyuk
17	FW	UKR	Denys Kuzubov (on loan from Metalist Kharkiv)
19	DF	UKR	Mykyta Teplyakov (on loan from Metalist Kharkiv)
22	MF	UKR	Illya Hlushko

No.	Pos.	Nation	Player
26	FW	UKR	Maksym Khimchak (on loan from Lviv)
32	DF	UKR	Serhiy Borzenko (captain)
33	DF	UKR	Yevheniy Radchenko
44	DF	UKR	Daniel Ehbudzhuo (on loan from Shakhtar Donetsk)
77	MF	UKR	Kyrylo Yermoshenko
81	GK	UKR	Denys Dyakov
88	DF	UKR	Denys Chaplanov

== Head coaches ==
- 2017 – 2019 Andriy Berezovchuk
- 2019 – 2020 Vitaliy Komarnytskyi
- 2020 – present Andriy Berezovchuk (also a sports director in both Vovchansk and Metal Kharkiv (2020–21))
