= FC Prykarpattia Ivano-Frankivsk (1998) =

Prykarpattia Ivano-Frankivsk
- Full name: FC Prykarpattia Ivano-Frankivsk
- Founded: 1998 (as Teplovyk)
- Ground: MCS Rukh, Ivano-Frankivsk
- Capacity: 15,000
- Owner(s): MFC Prykarpattia public organization Taras Huryk (chair of supervisory board); Andriy Popovych (president)
- Head Coach: Vasyl Yatsurak
- League: Ukrainian First League
- 2024–25: Ukrainian First League, 10th of 20
- Website: http://fc.if.ua/
Home colours	Away colours

FC Prykarpattia Ivano-Frankivsk is a professional Ukrainian football from Ivano-Frankivsk. The club competes in the Ukrainian First League. The club has been reformed based on FC Teplovyk Ivano-Frankivsk that existed since 1998.

Former football clubs known as Prykarpattia Ivano-Frankivsk

- FC Spartak Ivano-Frankivsk (1981–2003)
- FSC Prykarpattia Ivano-Frankivsk (2007–2012, previously Fakel)

== Overview ==
=== Names ===
- 1998–2013 Teplovyk
- 2013–2014 Nika-Teplovyk
- 2014–2016 Teplovyk
- 2016–2017 Teplovyk-Prykarpattia
- 2017–2025/07/31 Prykarpattia
- 2025/08/01–present Prykarpattia-Blago

=== History ===
The football club Teplovyk traces its founding roots to 1998 as a factory team of the State City Company "Ivano-Frankivsk Teplokomunenerho" (IFTKE). "Ivano-Frankivsk Teplokomunenerho" is an abbreviation for Ivano-Frankivsk community energy and utility.

At first the new football club was taking part in competitions among teams of utility companies of Ivano-Frankivsk, the region (Ivano-Frankivsk Oblast) as well as other mini-football tournaments.

During the two seasons, 1998 and 1999, the team competed in the regional championship under the auspice of the "Ukraine" fitness and sports society regional council and twice became a champion of this competition.

In 2000, the club entered the Ivano-Frankivsk Oblast championship at its top tier.

In 2002, the club won the Ivano-Frankivsk Oblast championship under the guidance of Vasyl Humenyaka.

In 2013, Teplovyk merged with a local youth football club Nika changed its name to Municipal Football Club Nika-Teplovyk.

Before the 2014 season, Nika-Teplovyk went bankrupt and separated, with Nika remaining in the Oblast Premier League, while Teplovyk for the 2014 season had to restart from the second league (second tier) with a help from another local company "Yutim".

In 2015, the team competed in competitions of the regional top tier. The senior team finished 6th place, while the youth team in parallel competitions won the championship.

In 2016, Teplovyk entered the Ukrainian Football Amateur League, where in a group phase it placed 4th out of 4. Nonetheless, initially, the club applied for the Second League, and its application was approved. At the same time, in the Ivano-Frankivsk Oblast championship top-tier continued to compete the club's reserve team Teplovyk-DYuSSh-3.

The club entered the 2016–17 Ukrainian Second League gaining the professional status. The club also adopted a new logo with the year of 2016 inscribed on it.

On 5 December 2016, the club's administration applied to change its name to Teplovyk-Prykarpattia for the spring portion of the competition, while simultaneously changing its name again to Prykarpattia for the 2017–18 season. The fact of renaming of Teplovyk into Prykarpattia was confirmed by the mayor of Ivano-Frankivsk, Ruslan Martsinkiv. The club's administration also adopted a new logo with the year 1981 inscribed on it when the original Spartak Ivano-Frankivsk changed to Prykarpattia.

In 2018, Prykarpattia's reserve team, Teplovyk-DYuSSh-3, competing at the Ivano-Frankivsk Oblast competitions, changed its name to Prykarpattia-Teplovyk.

Later, the club claimed that they were not just renamed but had been "revived" and distanced themself from Teplovyk.

On 17 April 2022, during the 2021–22 Ukrainian First League season and amidst the 2022 Russian invasion of Ukraine, 14 Prykarpattia players and coaches joined the Armed Forces of Ukraine. Because of that, the club changed its name to Prykarpattia-ZSU, under which it competed in Ukrainian competitions. In 2023, the Ukraine State Bureau of Investigation was investigating the legitimacy of players joining the Armed Forces of Ukraine.

On 11 July 2025, Prykarpattia Ivano-Frankivsk was renamed as Prykarpattia-Blaho Ivano-Frankivsk. The sponsoring company's name in the Latin script is "blago". At the same time, in Cyrillic, the club adopted its name as "Blaho".

== Honors ==
- Regional championship (Ivano-Frankivsk Oblast Football Federation)
  - Winners (1): 2002
  - Runners up (4): 2003, 2005, 2006, 2010
- Regional cup competition (Ivano-Frankivsk Oblast Football Federation)
  - Winners (2): 2003, 2004
  - Finalists (1): 2010
- Regional Super Cup (Ivano-Frankivsk Oblast Football Federation)
  - Winners (1): 2003

== Stadium ==
In 2000, the club played at the neglected city stadium Lokomotyv, which is one of the oldest in the city (opened in 1927). The club's owners reconstructed the stadium, added mounted electronic scoreboards and installed plastic seats to the central stand. The upgraded stadium was renamed as Stadion Hirka, which is the name for the location of the neighborhood where it is located. It has a seating capacity of 342 individual seats. At that time Volodymyr Roshnivskyi was both the director of the sports facility and the chairman of the club.

== Players ==
=== Team squad ===
As of 10 September 2026

Note: Flags indicate national team as defined under FIFA eligibility rules; some limited exceptions apply. Players may hold more than one non-FIFA nationality.

No.	Pos.	Nation	Player
2	DF	UKR	Oleksandr Zhmuyda
3	DF	UKR	Vasyl Frantsuz
4	DF	UKR	Vitaliy Korol
7	MF	UKR	Yuriy Radulskyi
8	MF	UKR	Yehor Demchenko
9	FW	UKR	Maksym Hraban
10	MF	UKR	Maksym Solovyov
14	FW	UKR	Vasyl Tsyutsyura
17	FW	UKR	Maksym Stadnik
19	FW	UKR	Vitaliy Kozenko
21	MF	UKR	Pavlo Mykhalchuk
23	MF	UKR	Stanislav Demkiv
24	GK	UKR	Ivan Pitsan

No.	Pos.	Nation	Player
26	GK	UKR	Andriy Bobynets
27	DF	UKR	Vladyslav Chushenko
29	MF	UKR	Vladyslav Osokin
30	DF	UKR	Serhiy Shvets
34	DF	UKR	Vasyl Henyk
41	FW	UKR	Maksym Marusych
44	FW	UKR	Vasyl Runich
71	GK	UKR	Svyatoslav Barasyuk
77	FW	UKR	Oleh Kos
88	MF	UKR	Maksym Protsiv
90	FW	UKR	Roman Barchuk
95	FW	UKR	Rostyslav Rusyn
99	FW	UKR	Yevhen Bespalko

=== Out on loan ===
Note: Flags indicate national team as defined under FIFA eligibility rules; some limited exceptions apply. Players may hold more than one non-FIFA nationality.

No. / Pos. / Nation / Player	No. / Pos. / Nation / Player

== Presidents ==
- ????–???? Volodymyr Roshnivskyi
- ????–2013 Mykola Vasylkiv
- 2013–2014 Andriy Shuliatytskyi (a nephew of Yuriy Shulyatytskyi)
- 2014–2016 Volodymyr Roshnivskyi
- 2016–2022 Vasyl Olshanetskyi
- 2022– Andriy Popovych

== Coaches ==
- Head coach – Oleh Rypan
- Coach – Yaroslav Martsinkiv
- Coach – Vasyl Yatsurak
- Coach – Oleksiy Horodov

== League and cup history ==
Season	Div.	Pos.	Pl.	W	D	L	GS	GA	P	Cup	Europe		Notes
2003	4th (Amateur Championship)	5	8	2	3	3	7	6	9				
2016	4th (Amateur Championship)	4	6	1	3	2	7	12	6				Promoted
2016–17	3rd (Second League)	10_{/17}	32	14	4	14	51	35	46				Renamed to Teplovyk-Prykarpattia Ivano-Frankivsk
2017–18	3rd (Second League)	2_{/10}	27	20	2	5	58	28	62	1/8 finals			Promoted to First League Renamed to Prykarpattia Ivano-Frankivsk
2018–19	2nd (First League)	10_{/16}	28	10	4	14	41	39	34	1/32 finals			
2019–20	2nd (First League)	12_{/16}	30	9	3	18	44	51	30	1/32 finals			
2020–21	2nd (First League)	14_{/16}	30	8	6	16	25	45	30	1/16 finals			
2021–22	2nd (First League)	7_{/16}	20	8	4	8	27	26	28	1/32 finals	-	-	-
2022–23	2nd(Persha Liha "A")	5_{/8}	14	4	3	7	11	22	15	-	-	-	Admitted to Relegation Group
2022–23	2nd(Persha Liha "REL")	9_{/16}	14	6	6	2	21	11	24	-	-	-	-
2023–24	2nd(Persha Liha "A")	5_{/10}	18	6	8	4	27	18	26	1/32 finals			Admitted to Promotion Group
2023–24	2nd(Persha Liha "PRO")	5_{/10}	28	10	10	8	35	30	40	1/32 finals			-
2024–25	2nd(Persha Liha "A")	7/8	14	3	4	7	14	18	13	1/32 finals	-	-	Admitted to Relegation Group
2024–25	2nd(Persha Liha "REL")	10/17	24	8	8	8	32	28	32	1/32 finals	-	-	-
2025–26	2nd(Persha Liha)	6/16	30	9	10	11	33	33	37	1/32 finals	-	-	-
2026–27	2nd(Persha Liha)	6/16	10	4	3	3	12	9	15	1/16 finals	-	-	TBD
