= 2017–18 FC Dnipro season =

Dnipro
2017–18 season
- President: Ihor Kolomoyskyi
- Manager: Oleksandr Poklonskyi
- Stadium: Dnipro-Arena
- Ukrainian Second League: 8th (relegated)
- Ukrainian Cup: Round 1 (1/64)
- Top goalscorer: League: Artem Dovbyk (12); All: Artem Dovbyk (12)
Home colours	Away colours

The 2017–18 season was the 1st season in the history of FC Dnipro in Ukrainian Second League and the last one before Dnipro lost professional status. Dnipro competed in Second League and in the Ukrainian Cup. During the season Dnipro was deducted of 18 points in total, which resulted in team finishing at 8th position despite decent results in the first half of the season. During the midseason Dnipro was relegated to 2018–19 Ukrainian Football Amateur League following the FIFA sanctions.

== Players ==
=== Squad information ===
As of 31 May 2018

Squad no.	Name	Nationality	Position	Date of birth (age)
Goalkeepers
1	Ivan Ponomarenko	(Ukraine)	GK	10 May 1998 (aged 20)
12	Maksym Luhovskyi	(Ukraine)	GK	8 August 2000 (aged 17)
13	Danylo Kucher	(Ukraine)	GK	25 January 1997 (aged 21)
99	Oleksiy Bashtanenko	(Ukraine)	GK	16 March 1994 (aged 24)
Defenders
2	Dmytro Bondar	(Ukraine)	DF	20 December 1998 (aged 19)
3	Dmytro Semenov	(Ukraine)	DF	4 November 1999 (aged 18)
4	Oleksandr Kulinich	(Ukraine)	DF	23 January 2000 (aged 18)
5	Serhiy Palyukh (Captain)	(Ukraine)	DF	2 January 1996 (aged 22)
6	Oleksandr Andrushko	(Ukraine)	DF	17 February 1999 (aged 19)
14	Volodymyr Kirychuk	(Ukraine)	DF	28 February 1996 (aged 22)
15	Denys Taraduda	(Ukraine)	DF	17 August 2000 (aged 17)
16	Mykyta Nechystenko	(Ukraine)	DF	12 July 2000 (aged 17)
22	Nazar Sydorenko	(Ukraine)	DF	13 March 2001 (aged 17)
28	Serhiy Zayets	(Ukraine)	DF	3 October 2001 (aged 16)
Midfielders
7	Dmytro Verhun	(Ukraine)	MF	12 June 1996 (aged 21)
8	Ivan Budnyak	(Ukraine)	MF	17 January 1999 (aged 19)
10	Danylo Poddubnyi	(Ukraine)	MF	28 October 1999 (aged 18)
11	Oleksiy Bandurin	(Ukraine)	MF	25 March 1998 (aged 20)
17	Valentyn Rubchynskyi	(Ukraine)	MF	15 May 2002 (aged 16)
19	Oleksandr Nazarenko	(Ukraine)	MF	1 February 2000 (aged 18)
20	Artem Dzhumyha	(Ukraine)	MF	30 May 2000 (aged 18)
21	Maksym Voytikhovskyi	(Ukraine)	MF	7 January 1999 (aged 19)
23	Anton Rykun	(Ukraine)	MF	21 June 2000 (aged 17)
24	Maksym Solovyov	(Ukraine)	MF	22 February 2002 (aged 16)
25	Danylo Volynets	(Ukraine)	MF	4 May 2002 (aged 16)
26	Daniil Shelayev	(Ukraine)	MF	17 January 2001 (aged 17)
30	Arsentiy Doroshenko	(Ukraine)	MF	7 June 2000 (aged 17)
32	Danylo Krylov	(Ukraine)	MF	6 September 2001 (aged 16)
35	Arseniy Batahov	(Ukraine)	MF	5 March 2002 (aged 16)
Forwards
9	Ivan Mykhaylenko	(Ukraine)	FW	19 April 1999 (aged 19)
18	Denys Kostyshyn	(Ukraine)	FW	31 August 1997 (aged 20)
29	Edvard Kobak	(Ukraine)	FW	22 April 2002 (aged 16)

== Transfers ==
=== In ===
Date	Pos.	Player	Age	Moving from	Type	Fee	Source

=== Out ===
Date	Pos.	Player	Age	Moving to	Type	Fee	Source
Summer
19 June 2017	FW	(Ukraine) Maksym Lunyov	19	(Ukraine) Zorya Luhansk	Transfer	Undisclosed	
24 June 2017	GK	(Ukraine) Andriy Lunin	18	(Ukraine) Zorya Luhansk	Transfer	Undisclosed	
24 June 2017	DF	(Ukraine) Oleksandr Svatok	22	(Ukraine) Zorya Luhansk	Transfer	Undisclosed	
24 June 2017	MF	(Ukraine) Yevhen Cheberko	19	(Ukraine) Zorya Luhansk	Transfer	Undisclosed	
24 June 2017	MF	(Ukraine) Vladyslav Kocherhin	21	(Ukraine) Zorya Luhansk	Transfer	Undisclosed	
28 June 2017	MF	(Ukraine) Ruslan Rotan	36	(Czech Republic) Slavia Prague	Transfer	Free	
1 July 2017	DF	(Romania) Alexandru Vlad	27	(Romania) CFR Cluj	Transfer	Free	
7 July 2017	DF	(Azerbaijan) Dmytro Nagiev	20	(Austria) Karabakh Wien	Transfer	Free	
7 July 2017	DF	(Ukraine) Yevhen Cheberyachko	34	(Ukraine) Dnipro-1	Transfer	Free	
7 July 2017	DF	(Ukraine) Maksym Lopyryonok	22	(Ukraine) Dnipro-1	Transfer	Free	
7 July 2017	DF	(Ukraine) Volodymyr Polyovyi	31	(Ukraine) Dnipro-1	Transfer	Free	
7 July 2017	DF	(Ukraine) Oleksandr Safronov	19	(Ukraine) Dnipro-1	Transfer	Free	
7 July 2017	MF	(Ukraine) Ihor Kohut	21	(Ukraine) Dnipro-1	Transfer	Free	
7 July 2017	MF	(Ukraine) Oleh Kozhushko	19	(Ukraine) Dnipro-1	Transfer	Free	
7 July 2017	MF	(Ukraine) Serhiy Kravchenko	34	(Ukraine) Dnipro-1	Transfer	Free	
11 July 2017	DF	(Ukraine) Volodymyr Adamyuk	25	(Ukraine) Veres Rivne	Transfer	Free	
18 July 2017	GK	(Ukraine) Denys Shelikhov	28	(Belarus) Isloch Minsk Raion	Transfer	Free	
1 September 2017	GK	(Ukraine) Viktor Babichyn	17	(Ukraine) Dnipro-1	Transfer	Free	
9 September 2017	FW	(Ukraine) Denys Balanyuk	20	(Poland) Wisła Kraków	Transfer	Free	
Winter
4 January 2018	MF	(Ukraine) Yehor Nazaryna	20	(Belgium) Royal Antwerp	Transfer	Unsisclosed	
23 January 2018	MF	(Ukraine) Yuriy Vakulko	20	(Serbia) Partizan	Transfer	Free	
31 January 2018	FW	(Ukraine) Artem Dovbyk	20	(Denmark) Midtjylland	Transfer	Free	
28 February 2018	MF	(Ukraine) Oleh Ilyin	20	(Ukraine) Kolos Kovalivka	Transfer	Free	

== Pre-season and friendlies ==
27 June 2017 Friendly	Dnipro	1–2	Naftovyk-Ukrnafta Okhtyrka	Dnipro
EEST (UTC+03:00)	60'	Report	90+'; 90+'	Stadium: Dnipro train base

28 June 2017 Friendly	Dnipro	2–1	Metalurh Zaporizhya	Dnipro
EEST (UTC+03:00)	15'; 23'	Report	Goal	Stadium: Dnipro train base

30 June 2017 Friendly	Zorya Luhansk U-21	1–0	Dnipro	Zaporizhia
EEST (UTC+03:00)		Report	Goal	Stadium: Torpedo Stadium

2 July 2017 Friendly	Dnipro	4–3	Inhulets Petrove	Dnipro
EEST (UTC+03:00)	Goal	Report	2'	Stadium: Dnipro train base

5 July 2017 Friendly	Dnipro	Cancelled	Metalist 1925 Kharkiv	Dnipro
EEST (UTC+03:00)		Report		Stadium: Dnipro train base

5 July 2017 Friendly	FC Novomoskovsk	2–1	Dnipro	Novomoskovsk
EEST (UTC+03:00)	Goal	Report	80'

5 July 2017 Friendly	Avanhard Kramatorsk	0–1	Dnipro	Zaporizhia
EEST (UTC+03:00)		Report	36'

5 July 2017 Friendly	Hirnyk-Sport Horishni Plavni	2–0	Dnipro	Horishni Plavni
EEST (UTC+03:00)	(pen.)	Report

25 January 2018 Friendly	Dnipro	0–2	Hirnyk-Sport Horishni Plavni	Dnipro
EET (UTC+02:00)		Report	32'; Batyushyn 55'	Stadium: Dnipro train base

29 January 2018 Prydniprovya Cup	Dnipro	5–0	Metalurh Zaporizhya	Dnipro
12:00 EET (UTC+02:00)	Mykhaylenko 19'; Nazarenko 20'; Budnyak 38' (pen.); Palyukh 48'; Kobak 65'	Report		Stadium: Dnipro train base

4 February 2018 Prydniprovya Cup	Dnipro	1–2	FC Volchansk	Dnipro
14:00 EET (UTC+02:00)	Poddubnyi 33'	Report	Batusov 5'; Volga 38'	Stadium: Dnipro train base

7 February 2018 Prydniprovya Cup	Dnipro	1–2	Tavriya-Skif Rozdol	Dnipro
13:00 EET (UTC+02:00)	Mykhaylenko 59'	Report	Kaskov 66', 79'	Stadium: Dnipro train base

10 February 2018 Prydniprovya Cup	Dnipro	2–1	VPK-Ahro Mahdalynivka	Dnipro
EET (UTC+02:00)	Kobak 47'; Mykhaylenko 63'	Report	Sokolyanskyi 89' (pen.)	Stadium: Dnipro train base

20 February 2018 Prydniprovya Cup	Dnipro	2–1	Avanhard Kramatorsk	Dnipro
13:00 EET (UTC+02:00)	Kobak 69'; Shynkarenko 73'	Report	Goal	Stadium: Dnipro train base

20 February 2018 Prydniprovya Cup	Dnipro	3–6	Avanhard Kramatorsk	Dnipro
15:00 EET (UTC+02:00)	Voytikhovskyi 44'; Mykhaylenko 56'; Poddubnyi 64'	Report	Goal	Stadium: Dnipro train base

24 February 2018 Prydniprovya Cup	Dnipro	1–0	Naftovyk-Ukrnafta Okhtyrka	Dnipro
12:00 EET (UTC+02:00)	Verhun 38'	Report		Stadium: Dnipro train base

1 March 2018 Yednist Cup	Dnipro	5–1	FC Petrykivka	Dnipro
13:00 EET (UTC+02:00)	Taraduda 21'; Verhun 43', 60'; Mykhaylenko 66'; Nazarenko 80'	Report	Sosna 90'	Stadium: Dnipro train base

6 March 2018 Yednist Cup	Dnipro	0–3	Viktoriya Mykolayivka	Dnipro
13:00 EET (UTC+02:00)		Report	Kuzmin 6'; Shevchenko 21', 27'	Stadium: Dnipro train base

9 March 2018 Exhibition game	Dnipro	1–2	Hirnyk-Sport Horishni Plavni	Dnipro
13:00 EET (UTC+02:00)	Andrushko 29'	Report	Shevchuk 43'; Fayuk	Stadium: Dnipro train base

13 March 2018 Yednist Cup	Dnipro	1–2	Motor Zaporizhia	Dnipro
13:00 EET (UTC+02:00)	Solovyov 51'	Report	Lomaka 53'; Molodozhon 83'	Stadium: Dnipro train base

16 March 2018 Prydniprovya Cup	Dnipro	0–1	VPK-Ahro Mahdalynivka	Dnipro
13:00 EET (UTC+02:00)		Report	Bozhenko 81'	Stadium: Dnipro train base

24 March 2018 Prydniprovya Cup	Dnipro	3–1	Zorya Luhansk U-21	Dnipro
14:20 EET (UTC+02:00)	Mykhaylenko 4', 32', 36'	Report	Novikov 51'	Stadium: Dnipro train base

== Competitions ==
=== Overall ===
Competition	Started round	Final position	First match	Last match
Second League	Matchday 1	8th	15 July 2017	31 May 2018
Cup	Round 1 (1/64)	Round 1 (1/64)	9 July 2017	9 July 2017

Last updated: 31 May 2018

=== Second League ===
Pos	Team	Pld	W	D	L	GF	GA	GD	Pts	Promotion, qualification or relegation
6	Real Pharma Odesa	33	15	7	11	54	40	+14	52	
7	FC Nikopol	33	11	12	10	36	34	+2	45	
8	FC Dnipro (R)	33	16	7	10	57	34	+23	37 (Note: FC Dnipro were deducted 18 points. Initially 3 points were deducted for failing to comply with a decision of the FIFA's Disciplinary Committee of 29 August 2017 Later on 16 January 2018, the PFL implemented FIFA's Disciplinary Committee findings which were originally informed to the FFU on 16 August 2017 about its decision to deduct the club 6 points. On 6 March 2018, Dnipro was deducted additional 9 points including 3 for breaking its contract with Egídio Pereira Júnior and 6 for other debts. On 2 May 2018 the President of Professional Football League Serhiy Makarov stated that he does not exclude a possibility of further relegation of Dnipro due to unpaid old debts.)	Relegation to Ukrainian Football Amateur League (Note: After completing the season, FC Dnipro failed attestation for the 2018–19 Ukrainian Second League season and were approved by the FIFA Disciplinary Committee to be relegated to a lower classification level due to unpaid old debts. There are speculations that the club will be dissolved. FC Dnipro tried, but failed attestation for the season and were approved by the FIFA Disciplinary Committee to be relegated to a lower classification level due to unpaid old debts)
9	MFC Mykolaiv-2	33	10	7	16	41	58	−17	37	
10	Inhulets-2 Petrove (Note: After completing the season, the administration of Inhulets Petrove decided to dissolve its reserve club Inhulets-2 Petrove citing that the club would concentrate their funds on the main club and infrastructure.)	33	4	7	22	29	70	−41	19	Withdrew after the season

Updated to match(es) played on 2 June 2018. Source: PFL.ua
Rules for classification: 1) Points; 2) Goal difference; 3) Goals scored; 4) Head-to-head points; 5) Head-to-head goal difference; 6) Head-to-head goals scored; 7) Fair play; 8) Draw or play-off.
(R) Relegated

==== Results summary ====
Overall								Home						Away					
Pld	W	D	L	GF	GA	GD	Pts	W	D	L	GF	GA	GD	W	D	L	GF	GA	GD
33	16	7	10	57	34	+23	55	10	3	4	33	14	+19	6	4	6	24	20	+4

Last updated: 31 May 2018.
Source: Competitive matches

==== Results by round ====
Round	1	2	3	4	5	6	7	8	9	10	11	12	13	14	15	16	17	18	19	20	21	22	23	24	25	26	27	28	29	30	31	32	33
Ground	A	H	A	H	A	H	A	H	A	A	H	H	A	H	A	H	A	H	A	H	H	A	H	A	H	A	H	H	A	H	A	H	A
Result	L	D	W	W	D	L	W	W	W	D	W	W	W	W	D	W	L	W	L	W	D	D	W	W	L	L	W	L	L	L	L	D	W
Position	9	9	6	4	6	8	6	5	3	4	4	3	2	2	3	2	3	3	3	3	3	3	8	8	8	8	8	8	9	9	9	9	8

Updated to match(es) played on 31 May 2018. Source: Competitive matches
A = Away; H = Home; W = Win; D = Draw; L = Loss

==== Matches ====
15 July 2017 1	Real Pharma Odesa	2–1	Dnipro	Odesa
18:00 EEST (UTC+03:00)	Sula 54'; Kostyuk 90+2'; Bondarenko (red card) 90+3'	Report	Kostyshyn 50' (pen.), (yellow card) 73'; Ilyin (yellow card) 57'; Semenov (yellow card) 66'	Stadium: Ivan Stadium; Attendance: 1,000; Referee: Dorosh

22 July 2017 2	Dnipro	2–2	Enerhiya Nova Kakhovka	Dnipro
18:00 EEST (UTC+03:00)	Nazarenko 3'; Budnyak 49'; Verhun (yellow card) 64'; Kostyshyn (yellow card) 66'	Report	Kireyev (yellow card) 57'; Shastal 67', (yellow card) 87'; Molochko 70'; Makhnyev (yellow card) 82'	Stadium: Dnipro-Arena; Attendance: 1,700; Referee: Bych

31 July 2017 3	MFC Mykolaiv-2	2–4	Dnipro	Mykolaiv
18:00 EEST (UTC+03:00)	Berko 9'; Minin (yellow card) 14'; Lyashevskyi (red card) 53'; Yavorskyi 63'; Barskyi (yellow card) 69'; Bessalov (yellow card) 86'	Report	Taraduda (yellow card) 13'; Bondar (yellow card) 34' (yellow-red card) 55'; Nazarenko 34', 64'; Voytikhovskyi (yellow card) 53'; Nazaryna 76'; Kostyshyn (yellow card) 79'; Poddubnyi 84'	Stadium: Tsentralnyi Stadion; Attendance: 300; Referee: Kubryak

5 August 2017 4	Dnipro	2–0	Inhulets-2 Petrove	Dnipro
18:00 EEST (UTC+03:00)	Ilyin 53'; Kostyshyn 54'; Nazaryna (yellow card) 87'	Report	Tsybin (yellow card) 45+2'; Kretov (yellow card) 60'; Radivilov (yellow card) 87'; Besarab (yellow card) 90+2'; Kobuladze (yellow card) 90+3'	Stadium: Dnipro-Arena; Attendance: 1,207; Referee: Salnikov

9 August 2017 5	Dnipro-1	0–0	Dnipro	Dnipro
20:00 EEST (UTC+03:00)		Report	Vakulko (yellow card) 13'	Stadium: Dnipro-Arena; Attendance: 8,451; Referee: Buyashov

13 August 2017 6	Dnipro	2–3	Metalist 1925 Kharkiv	Dnipro
18:00 EEST (UTC+03:00)	Dovbyk 79' (pen.); Mykhaylenko 85'	Report	Romanov (yellow card) 42'; Bulychev 47'; Davydov 55', 86'; Edmar (yellow card) 67'; Zhdanov (red card) 89'	Stadium: Dnipro-Arena; Attendance: 1,563; Referee: Serputko

18 August 2017 7	Metalurh Zaporizhya	0–5	Dnipro	Zaporizhia
12:00 EEST (UTC+03:00)	Chernyavskyi (yellow card) 36'; Bozhyi (yellow card) 71'	Report	Dovbyk 37', 47'; Budnyak 39', 87'; Nazaryna (yellow card) 51'; Ilyin 57'	Stadium: Metalurh Training Base; Attendance: 300; Referee: Buyashov

26 August 2017 8	Dnipro	1–0	Tavriya Simferopol	Dnipro
18:00 EEST (UTC+03:00)	Vakulko (yellow card) 42'; Semenov (yellow card) 64'; Ilyin (yellow card) 83'; Palyukh (yellow card) 90'; Mykhaylenko 90+5'	Report	Pavlyk (yellow card) 26'; Shevel (yellow card) 64'	Stadium: Dnipro-Arena; Attendance: 1,600; Referee: Blevatskyi

30 August 2017 9	Sudnobudivnyk Mykolaiv	0–2	Dnipro	Pervomaisk
17:00 EEST (UTC+03:00)	Honcharov (yellow card) 45+1' (yellow-red card) 79'; Zaychek (yellow card) 72'; Kotov (yellow card) 86'	Report	Semenov 50'; Nazarenko (yellow card) 50', (goal) 82'; Ilyin (yellow card) 86'	Stadium: Central City Stadium; Attendance: 500; Referee: Kovalenko

4 September 2017 10	Myr Hornostayivka	0–0	Dnipro	Hornostaivka
17:00 EEST (UTC+03:00)	Rafalskyi (yellow card) 39'; Tsurupin (yellow card) 41'; Chmelenko (yellow card) 55'	Report		Stadium: Zatys Stadium; Attendance: 200; Referee: Bych

9 September 2017 11	Dnipro	2–0	Nikopol	Dnipro
17:00 EEST (UTC+03:00)	Nazarenko (yellow card) 14'; Dovbyk 64'; Vakulko (yellow card) 69'; Budnyak 95'	Report	Shvets (yellow card) 38'; Taryanyk (yellow card) 62' (yellow-red card) 90'	Stadium: Dnipro-Arena; Attendance: 1,600; Referee: Reznikov

16 September 2017 12	Dnipro	3–1	Real Pharma Odesa	Dnipro
17:00 EEST (UTC+03:00)	Dovbyk 42'; Nazaryna 45+1', (yellow card) 50'; Bondar (yellow card) 62'; Kulinich (yellow card) 77'; Mykhaylenko 82'	Report	Kalitov (yellow card) 14'; Horbovskyi (yellow card) 43'; Trakanovskyi (yellow card) 45'; Oprya 90+3'	Stadium: Dnipro-Arena; Attendance: 1,100; Referee: Kovalenko

24 September 2017 13	Enerhiya Nova Kakhovka	1–2	Dnipro	Nova Kakhovka
16:00 EEST (UTC+03:00)	Bondarenko (yellow card) 39'; Protsyshyn (yellow card) 40'; Bochak 54'	Report	Dovbyk 32', 69'; Nazaryna (yellow card) 55'; Palyukh (yellow card) 78'	Stadium: Enerhiya Stadium; Attendance: 1,500; Referee: Blavatskyi

30 September 2017 14	Dnipro	1–0	MFC Mykolaiv-2	Dnipro
16:00 EEST (UTC+03:00)	Dovbyk 24'; Vakulko (yellow card) 49'	Report	Zaykov (yellow card) 56'	Stadium: Dnipro-Arena; Attendance: 1,100; Referee: Kuzovlyev

7 October 2017 15	Inhulets-2 Petrove	3–3	Dnipro	Volodymyrivka
15:00 EEST (UTC+03:00)	Ryabushko 10', 47', (yellow card) 34'; Kotsyumaka 12'; Kobuladze (yellow card) 73'; Besarab (yellow card) 83'	Report	Ponomarenko (yellow card) 22'; Palyukh (yellow card) 26'; Kostyshyn 40', 65', (yellow card) 68'; Doroshenko 90+4'	Stadium: Povoroznyuk Stadium; Attendance: 400; Referee: Zabroda

11 October 2017 16	Dnipro	2–0	Dnipro-1	Dnipro
19:00 EEST (UTC+03:00)	Verhun (yellow card) 16'; Kulinich (yellow card) 35'; Dovbyk 43'; Bashtanenko (yellow card) 61'; Nazarenko 80'; Nazaryna (yellow card) 84'	Report	Brovchenko (yellow card) 45'; Snizhko (yellow card) 61'; Sula (yellow card) 70'; Lohinov (yellow card) 86'	Stadium: Dnipro-Arena; Attendance: 3,500; Referee: Aranovskyi

15 October 2017 17	Metalist 1925 Kharkiv	1–0	Dnipro	Kharkiv
15:00 EEST (UTC+03:00)	Davydov (yellow card) 44'; Zhdanov 54'; Krayev (yellow card) 85'	Report	Dovbyk (yellow card) 57'; Palyukh (yellow card) 85'	Stadium: OSC Metalist; Attendance: 7,886; Referee: Ivanov

21 October 2017 18	Dnipro	5–0	Metalurh Zaporizhya	Dnipro
15:00 EEST (UTC+03:00)	Kostyshyn 29', 75'; Nazaryna (yellow card) 35'; Dovbyk 50'; Mykhaylenko 76'; Semenov 88'; Doroshenko (yellow card) 90+4'	Report		Stadium: Dnipro-Arena; Attendance: 849; Referee: Tsybulko

30 October 2017 19	Tavriya Simferopol	2–1	Dnipro	Beryslav
14:00 EET (UTC+02:00)	Voronchenko 10', 20'; Masalov (yellow card) 14'; Lohvinenko (yellow card) 54' (yellow-red card) 83'	Report	Palyukh (red card) 8'; Nazaryna (yellow card) 19'; Poddubnyi 85'; Voytikhovskyi (yellow card) 87'	Stadium: Mashynobudivnyk Stadium; Attendance: 500; Referee: Serputko

4 November 2017 20	Dnipro	5–0	Sudnobudivnyk Mykolaiv	Dnipro
14:00 EET (UTC+02:00)	Nazaryna 9'; Nazarenko 25'; Dovbyk 27', 70'; Kirychuk (yellow card) 36'; Semenov 53' (pen.); Bondar (yellow card) 71'	Report	Kuyanov (yellow card) 20'; Ratushnyi (yellow card) 47'; Zaychek (yellow card) 57'	Stadium: Dnipro-Arena; Attendance: 800; Referee: Zora

11 November 2017 21	Dnipro	1–1	Myr Hornostayivka	Dnipro
14:00 EET (UTC+02:00)	Nazarenko (yellow card) 30'; Nazaryna (yellow card) 79'; Kirychuk (yellow card) 83'; Doroshenko 84'	Report	Tsybulskyi 31'; Sorokyn (yellow card) 39'; Krasov (yellow card) 49'	Stadium: Dnipro-Arena; Attendance: 600; Referee: Kovalenko

18 November 2017 22	Nikopol	0–0	Dnipro	Nikopol
13:30 EET (UTC+02:00)	Shestipalov (yellow card) 57'; Milesin (yellow card) 84'; Shmyhelskyi (yellow card) 88'	Report		Stadium: Elektrometalurh Stadium; Attendance: 1,000; Referee: Koshura

30 March 2018 23	Dnipro	2–0	Sudnobudivnyk Mykolaiv	Dnipro
13:00 EET (UTC+02:00)	Mykhaylenko 16', 69'; Kostyshyn (yellow card) 47'	Report	Honcharov (yellow card) 31'; Zadera (yellow card) 54'; Chastokolyanyi (red card) 68'	Stadium: Dnipro-Arena; Attendance: 0 Referee: Tytov

6 April 2018 24	Inhulets-2 Petrove	1–3	Dnipro	Volodymyrivka
14:00 EET (UTC+02:00)	Prokhnya (yellow card) 45', (goal) 78'; Ella (yellow card) 68'	Report	Palyukh (yellow card) 27'; Verhun 37', (yellow card) 42' (yellow-red card) 74'; Voytikhovskyi (yellow card) 58'; Mykhaylenko 65'; Andrushko (yellow card) 69'; Nazarenko 82'; Taraduda (yellow card) 90'	Stadium: Povoroznyuk Stadium; Attendance: 400; Referee: Kuzovlyev

13 April 2018 25	Dnipro	1–2	Dnipro-1	Dnipro
19:00 EET (UTC+02:00)	Voytikhovskyi (yellow card) 49'; Bondar (yellow card) 59'; Kirychuk (yellow card) 69' (yellow-red card) 80', (goal) 78'; Palyukh (yellow card) 71'	Report	Poplavka 48'; Memeshev (yellow card) 56'; Supryaha 83'	Stadium: Dnipro-Arena; Attendance: 5,300; Referee: Bych

22 April 2018 26	Metalist 1925 Kharkiv	3–0	Dnipro	Kharkiv
17:00 EET (UTC+02:00)	Krayev 6'; Davydov 19'; Synytsya (yellow card) 55'; Skotarenko 63'	Report	Verhun (yellow card) 53'; Kostyshyn (yellow card) 55'; Semenov (yellow card) 80'	Stadium: OSC Metalist; Attendance: 8,638; Referee: Osaulenko

27 April 2018 27	Dnipro	2–1	Metalurh Zaporizhya	Dnipro
17:00 EET (UTC+02:00)	Verhun (yellow card) 26'; Mykhaylenko 36', (red card) 45+1'; Nazarenko (yellow card) 50'; Kostyshyn 54'	Report	Chumak (yellow card) 51'; Bashynskyi 81'; Kernozhytskyi (yellow card) 90+2'; Nekrasov (yellow card) 90+5'	Stadium: Dnipro-Arena; Attendance: 500; Referee: Ponomarenko

2 May 2018 28	Dnipro	0–1	Enerhiya Nova Kakhovka	Novomoskovsk
17:00 EET (UTC+02:00)	Semenov (yellow card) 41'; Palyukh (yellow card) 76'	Report	Molochko (yellow card) 42'; Semenov 51' (o.g.); Protsyshyn (yellow card) 66'; Roslyakov (yellow card) 77'; Bondarenko (yellow card) 90+2'	Stadium: Metalurh Stadium; Attendance: 900; Referee: Lepko

6 May 2018 29	Myr Hornostayivka	3–1	Dnipro	Hornostaivka
18:00 EET (UTC+02:00)	Shmyhol (yellow card) 37'; Brynko (yellow card) 55'; Prytykovskyi (yellow card) 58'; Chmelenko 65'; Boyko 81', (yellow card) 81'; Tsybulskyi 88'; Tomenko (yellow card) 90'	Report	Kirychuk (yellow card) 11'; Bondar (yellow card) 52'; Budnyak 43', (yellow card) 55'; Verhun (yellow card) 75'; Voytikhovskyi (yellow card) 78'; Semenov (yellow card) 89'; Doroshenko (yellow card) 90'	Stadium: Zatys Stadium; Attendance: 500; Referee: Stashuk

13 May 2018 30	Dnipro	1–2	Tavriya Simferopol	Dnipro
16:00 EET (UTC+02:00)	Voytikhovskyi (yellow card) 26'; Kostyshyn (yellow card) 31'; Kirychuk (yellow card) 65'; Palyukh (yellow card) 70'; Nazarenko (yellow card) 86'; Poddubnyi 90'	Report	Voronchenko 45+1'; Hryppa 60'; Tyshchenko (yellow card) 64'	Stadium: Dnipro-Arena; Attendance: 800; Referee: Kuzovlyev

19 May 2018 31	Real Pharma Odesa	1–0	Dnipro	Odesa
14:30 EET (UTC+02:00)	Zakharchenko (yellow card) 51'; Dmytriyev 68'; Yermakov (yellow card) 86'; Kostyuk (yellow card) 90+1'	Report	Voytikhovskyi (yellow card) 20' (yellow-red card) 38'; Verhun (yellow card) 24'; Andrushko (yellow card) 45'; Semenov (yellow card) 66'; Bondar (yellow card) 79'; Taraduda (yellow card) 82'; Kostyshyn (yellow card) 90+1'	Stadium: Ivan Stadium; Attendance: 250; Referee: Kovalenko

25 May 2018 32	Dnipro	1–1	Nikopol	Dnipro
17:30 EET (UTC+02:00)	Verhun (yellow card) 31'; Kobak 42', (yellow card) 51'; Doroshenko (yellow card) 62'; Palyukh (yellow card) 68'	Report	Voronin (yellow card) 48'; Kolomoyets (yellow card) 53', (goal) 65' (pen.); Shmyhelskyi (yellow card) 60'; Burkovskyi (yellow card) 68'; Tverdoukh (yellow card) 90'	Stadium: Dnipro-Arena; Attendance: 500; Referee: Dubrovets

31 May 2018 33	MFC Mykolaiv-2	1–2	Dnipro	Mykolaiv
17:30 EET (UTC+02:00)	Barskyi (yellow card) 34'; Tolharenko 89' (pen.); Kucherenko (yellow card) 90+1'	Report	Nazarenko 26', (yellow card) 90+8'; Semenov 36'; Bondar (yellow card) 58'; Verhun (yellow card) 63'; Taraduda (yellow card) 88'; Palyukh (yellow card) 88' (yellow-red card) 90+8'	Stadium: Park Peremohy; Attendance: 300; Referee: Bakulin

=== Ukrainian Cup ===
9 July 2017 Round 1 (1/64)	SCC Demnya	2–1	Dnipro	Demnya
17:00 EEST (UTC+03:00)	Panchenko (yellow card) 25'; Barabash 34', (yellow card) 43'; Krashevskyi (yellow card) 87'; Kukharskyi (yellow card) 90+4'; Denkiv 110'; Husak (yellow card) 118'	Report	Kulinich (yellow card) 36'; Poddubnyi 77'; Budnyak (yellow card) 82'	Stadium: Kuziv Stadium; Attendance: 1,200; Referee: Stepan Lapko

== Statistics ==
=== Appearances and goals ===
No.	Pos	Nat	Player	Total		Premier League		Cup	
No.	Pos	Nat	Player	Apps	Goals	Apps	Goals	Apps	Goals
Goalkeepers
1	GK	(Ukraine) UKR	Ivan Ponomarenko	16	0	15	0	1	0
12	GK	(Ukraine) UKR	Maksym Luhovskyi	1	0	0+1	0	0	0
99	GK	(Ukraine) UKR	Oleksiy Bashtanenko	15	0	15	0	0	0
Defenders
2	DF	(Ukraine) UKR	Dmytro Bondar	26	0	24+2	0	0	0
3	DF	(Ukraine) UKR	Dmytro Semenov	30	3	27+2	3	1	0
4	DF	(Ukraine) UKR	Oleksandr Kulinich	23	0	22	0	1	0
5	DF	(Ukraine) UKR	Serhiy Palyukh	29	0	28+1	0	0	0
6	DF	(Ukraine) UKR	Oleksandr Andrushko	12	0	11+1	0	0	0
14	DF	(Ukraine) UKR	Volodymyr Kirychuk	28	1	24+3	1	1	0
15	DF	(Ukraine) UKR	Denys Taraduda	22	0	8+13	0	0+1	0
16	DF	(Ukraine) UKR	Mykyta Nechystenko	12	0	0+11	0	0+1	0
Midfielders
7	MF	(Ukraine) UKR	Dmytro Verhun	26	1	19+7	1	0	0
8	MF	(Ukraine) UKR	Ivan Budnyak	25	5	13+11	5	1	0
10	MF	(Ukraine) UKR	Danylo Poddubnyi	31	4	6+24	3	0+1	1
11	MF	(Ukraine) UKR	Oleksiy Bandurin	1	0	0	0	1	0
17	MF	(Ukraine) UKR	Valentyn Rubchynskyi	4	0	0+4	0	0	0
19	MF	(Ukraine) UKR	Oleksandr Nazarenko	28	8	26+1	8	1	0
20	MF	(Ukraine) UKR	Artem Dzhumyha	6	0	0+6	0	0	0
21	MF	(Ukraine) UKR	Maksym Voytikhovskyi	23	0	12+10	0	1	0
23	MF	(Ukraine) UKR	Anton Rykun	6	0	0+6	0	0	0
25	MF	(Ukraine) UKR	Danylo Volynets	7	0	0+7	0	0	0
30	MF	(Ukraine) UKR	Arsentiy Doroshenko	16	3	9+7	3	0	0
35	MF	(Ukraine) UKR	Arseniy Batahov	4	0	1+3	0	0	0
Forwards
9	FW	(Ukraine) UKR	Ivan Mykhaylenko	27	8	12+14	8	1	0
18	FW	(Ukraine) UKR	Denys Kostyshyn	32	7	24+7	7	1	0
29	FW	(Ukraine) UKR	Edvard Kobak	4	1	2+2	1	0	0
Players transferred out during the season
17	MF	(Ukraine) UKR	Oleh Ilyin	23	2	21+1	2	1	0
28	MF	(Ukraine) UKR	Yuriy Vakulko	12	0	12	0	0	0
29	MF	(Ukraine) UKR	Yehor Nazaryna	18	3	16+2	3	0	0
35	FW	(Ukraine) UKR	Artem Dovbyk	13	12	11+2	12	0	0
41	GK	(Ukraine) UKR	Viktor Babichyn	3	0	3	0	0	0

Source: Competitive matches

Last updated: 31 May 2018

=== Goalscorers ===
Rank	No.	Pos	Nat	Name	Second League	Cup	Total
1	35	FW	(Ukraine)	Artem Dovbyk	12	0	12
2	9	FW	(Ukraine)	Ivan Mykhaylenko	8	0	8
2	19	MF	(Ukraine)	Oleksandr Nazarenko	8	0	8
4	18	FW	(Ukraine)	Denys Kostyshyn	7	0	7
5	8	MF	(Ukraine)	Ivan Budnyak	5	0	5
6	10	MF	(Ukraine)	Danylo Poddubnyi	3	1	4
7	3	DF	(Ukraine)	Dmytro Semenov	3	0	3
7	29	MF	(Ukraine)	Yehor Nazaryna	3	0	3
7	30	MF	(Ukraine)	Arsentiy Doroshenko	3	0	3
10	17	MF	(Ukraine)	Oleh Ilyin	2	0	2
11	7	MF	(Ukraine)	Dmytro Verhun	1	0	1
11	14	DF	(Ukraine)	Volodymyr Kirychuk	1	0	1
11	29	FW	(Ukraine)	Edvard Kobak	1	0	1
				Total	57	1	58

Last updated: 31 May 2018.
Source: Competitive matches

=== Clean sheets ===
Rank	No.	Pos	Nat	Name	Premier League	Cup	Total
1	1	GK	(Ukraine)	Ivan Ponomarenko	6	0	6
1	99	GK	(Ukraine)	Oleksiy Bashtanenko	6	0	6
3	41	GK	(Ukraine)	Viktor Babichyn	1	0	1
				Total	13	0	13

Last updated: 31 May 2018.
Source: Competitive matches

=== Disciplinary record ===
No.	Pos	Nat	Player	Premier League			Cup			Total		
No.	Pos	Nat	Player	Booked	(yellow card) (yellow-red card)	Sent off (straight red)	Booked	(yellow card) (yellow-red card)	Sent off (straight red)	Booked	(yellow card) (yellow-red card)	Sent off (straight red)
1	GK	(Ukraine)	Ivan Ponomarenko	1	0	0	0	0	0	1	0	0
2	DF	(Ukraine)	Dmytro Bondar	6	1	0	0	0	0	6	1	0
3	DF	(Ukraine)	Dmytro Semenov	7	0	0	0	0	0	7	0	0
4	DF	(Ukraine)	Oleksandr Kulinich	2	0	0	1	0	0	3	0	0
5	DF	(Ukraine)	Serhiy Palyukh	9	1	1	0	0	0	9	1	1
6	DF	(Ukraine)	Oleksandr Andrushko	2	0	0	0	0	0	2	0	0
7	MF	(Ukraine)	Dmytro Verhun	8	1	0	0	0	0	8	1	0
8	MF	(Ukraine)	Ivan Budnyak	1	0	0	1	0	0	2	0	0
9	FW	(Ukraine)	Ivan Mykhaylenko	0	0	1	0	0	0	0	0	1
14	DF	(Ukraine)	Volodymyr Kirychuk	4	1	0	0	0	0	4	1	0
15	DF	(Ukraine)	Denys Taraduda	4	0	0	0	0	0	4	0	0
17	MF	(Ukraine)	Oleh Ilyin	3	0	0	0	0	0	3	0	0
18	FW	(Ukraine)	Denys Kostyshyn	8	0	0	0	0	0	8	0	0
19	MF	(Ukraine)	Oleksandr Nazarenko	6	0	0	0	0	0	6	0	0
21	MF	(Ukraine)	Maksym Voytikhovskyi	6	1	0	0	0	0	6	1	0
28	MF	(Ukraine)	Yuriy Vakulko	4	0	0	0	0	0	4	0	0
29	MF	(Ukraine)	Yehor Nazaryna	8	0	0	0	0	0	8	0	0
29	FW	(Ukraine)	Edvard Kobak	1	0	0	0	0	0	1	0	0
30	MF	(Ukraine)	Arsentiy Doroshenko	2	0	0	0	0	0	2	0	0
35	FW	(Ukraine)	Artem Dovbyk	1	0	0	0	0	0	1	0	0
99	GK	(Ukraine)	Oleksiy Bashtanenko	1	0	0	0	0	0	1	0	0
			Total	84	5	2	2	0	0	86	5	2

Last updated: 31 May 2018
