= Zayets =

Zayets (Ukrainian: Заєць) is a surname. Notable people with the surname include:

- Oleksandr Zayets (1962–2007), Ukrainian football player
- Serhiy Zayets (born 1969), Ukrainian football player and manager
- Serhiy Zayets (footballer, born 2001) (born 2001), Ukrainian football player
- Vladimir Zayets (born 1981), Azerbaijani athlete
