= Oleksandr Nazarenko =

Ukrainian footballer

Personal information
- Full name: Oleksandr Yevheniyovych Nazarenko
- Date of birth: 1 February 2000 (age 26)
- Place of birth: Dnipropetrovsk, Ukraine
- Height: 1.73 m (5 ft 8 in)
- Position: Midfielder

Team information
- Current team: Polissya Zhytomyr
- Number: 7

Youth career
- 2013–2017: Dnipro

Senior career*
Years	Team	Apps	(Gls)
2017–2018	Dnipro	27	(8)
2018–2023	Dnipro-1	109	(16)
2023–	Polissya Zhytomyr	75	(15)

International career^{‡}
2018	Ukraine U18	2	(0)
2018	Ukraine U19	1	(0)
2019–2023	Ukraine U21	23	(1)
2024	Ukraine U23	1	(0)
2024–	Ukraine	7	(0)
Medal record
Men's football
Representing Ukraine
UEFA European Under-21 Championship
Bronze medal – third place	2023 Georgia-Romania
- * Club domestic league appearances and goals as of 18 September 2026 ‡ National team caps and goals as of 2 October 2026

Oleksandr Yevheniyovych Nazarenko (Ukrainian: Олександр Євгенійович Назаренко; born 1 February 2000) is a Ukrainian professional footballer who plays as a midfielder for Polissya Zhytomyr and the Ukraine national team.

== Career ==
Nazarenko is a product of the Dnipro academy.

He started to play for FC Dnipro in the UPL U-21 competitions in 2017 just before the club was relegation due to sanctions. Nazarenko made his debut for the club's senior squad in the Ukrainian Second League in the match against FC Real Pharma Odesa on 15 July 2017 in a 1–2 away loss.

At the end of the 2017–18 Ukrainian Second League Nazarenko moved to the newly created SC Dnipro-1. The next season 2018–19 already in the Ukrainian First League he was recognized as a player of the month for September.

In August 2023 Nazarenko signed a contract with the Ukrainian Premier League debutant Polissya Zhytomyr.

== Career statistics ==
=== Club ===
As of 18 September 2026

Appearances and goals by club, season and competition
Club	Season	League			Cup		Continental		Other		Total	
Club	Season	Division	Apps	Goals	Apps	Goals	Apps	Goals	Apps	Goals	Apps	Goals
Dnipro	2017–18	Ukrainian Second League	27	8	1	0	—		—		28	8
Dnipro-1	2018–19	Ukrainian First League	25	7	3	1	—		—		28	8
Dnipro-1	2019–20	Ukrainian Premier League	26	2	2	0	—		—		28	2
Dnipro-1	2020–21	Ukrainian Premier League	19	4	3	2	—		—		22	6
Dnipro-1	2021–22	Ukrainian Premier League	16	2	0	0	—		—		16	2
Dnipro-1	2022–23	Ukrainian Premier League	23	1	0	0	8 (Note: Two appearances in UEFA Europa League, six appearances in UEFA Conference League)	0	—		31	1
Dnipro-1	Total		109	16	8	3	8	0	—		125	19
Polissya Zhytomyr	2023–24	Ukrainian Premier League	19	3	2	0	—		—		21	3
Polissya Zhytomyr	2024–25	Ukrainian Premier League	28	7	3	0	2 (Note: Appearances in UEFA Conference League)	0	—		33	7
Polissya Zhytomyr	2025–26	Ukrainian Premier League	28	5	1	0	6	1	—		35	6
Polissya Zhytomyr	2026–27	Ukrainian Premier League	7	1	1	0	2	0	—		10	1
Polissya Zhytomyr	Total		82	16	7	0	10	1	—		99	17
Career total			218	40	16	3	18	0	—		252	44

=== International ===
As of match played 2 October 2026

Appearances and goals by national team and year
National team	Year	Apps	Goals
Ukraine	2024	3	0
Ukraine	2025	1	0
Ukraine	2026	3	0
Total		7	0
