= Yehor Nazaryna =

Ukrainian footballer

Personal information
- Full name: Yehor Anatoliyovych Nazaryna
- Date of birth: 10 July 1997 (age 29)
- Place of birth: Pryluky, Ukraine
- Height: 1.83 m (6 ft 0 in)
- Position: Central midfielder

Team information
- Current team: Shakhtar Donetsk
- Number: 29

Youth career
- 200?–2010: Yevropa Pryluky
- 2010–2014: Dynamo Kyiv

Senior career*
Years	Team	Apps	(Gls)
2014–2017	Dnipro	19	(3)
2018–2020	Royal Antwerp	10	(0)
2019–2020	→ Karpaty Lviv (loan)	15	(5)
2020–2022	Zorya Luhansk	42	(2)
2022–	Shakhtar Donetsk	83	(4)

International career^{‡}
2016	Ukraine U20	1	(0)
2018	Ukraine U21	1	(0)
2023–	Ukraine	14	(0)
- * Club domestic league appearances and goals as of 30 October 2026 ‡ National team caps and goals as of 18 November 2026

Yehor Anatoliyovych Nazaryna (Ukrainian: Єгор Анатолійович Назарина; born 10 July 1997) is a Ukrainian professional footballer who plays as a central midfielder for Shakhtar Donetsk and the Ukraine national team.

== Club career ==
Nazaryna is a product of Yevropa Pryluky (first coach was Andriy Shmatko) and Dynamo Kyiv academies.

He made his debut for Dnipro on 20 May 2017, as a substitute in the second half of a Ukrainian Premier League match against Stal Kamianske.

== International career ==
In August 2023, Nazaryna received his first call-up to the Ukraine senior national team by head coach Serhiy Rebrov, for two UEFA Euro 2024 qualifying matches against England and Italy.

== Career statistics ==
=== Club ===
As of match played 3 November 2026

Appearances and goals by club, season and competition
Club	Season	League			National cup		Europe		Other		Total	
Club	Season	Division	Apps	Goals	Apps	Goals	Apps	Goals	Apps	Goals	Apps	Goals
Dnipro	2016–17	Ukrainian Premier League	1	0	0	0	0	0	0	0	1	0
Dnipro	2017–18	Druha Liga	18	3	0	0	0	0	0	0	18	3
Dnipro	Total		19	3	0	0	0	0	0	0	19	3
Royal Antwerp	2017–18	Belgian Pro League	8	0	0	0	–		–		8	0
Royal Antwerp	2018–19	Belgian Pro League	9	0	1	0	–		–		10	0
Royal Antwerp	Total		17	0	1	0	–		–		18	0
Karpaty Lviv (loan)	2019–20	Ukrainian Premier League	15	5	1	0	–		–		16	5
Zorya Luhansk	2020–21	Ukrainian Premier League	25	0	3	0	6 (Note: Appearances in UEFA Europa League)	0	–		34	0
Zorya Luhansk	2021–22	Ukrainian Premier League	13	1	0	0	6 (Note: Two appearances in UEFA Europa League, four appearances and one goal in UEFA Europa Conference League)	1	–		19	1
Zorya Luhansk	2022–23	Ukrainian Premier League	4	1	0	0	2 (Note: Appearances in UEFA Europa Conference League)	0	–		6	0
Zorya Luhansk	Total		42	2	3	0	14	1	–		59	3
Shakhtar Donetsk	2022–23	Ukrainian Premier League	20	0	0	0	3	0	–		23	0
Shakhtar Donetsk	2023–24	Ukrainian Premier League	20	2	2	1	5 (Note: One appearance in UEFA Champions League, four appearances in UEFA Europa League)	0	–		27	3
Shakhtar Donetsk	2024–25	Ukrainian Premier League	14	0	4	0	0	0	–		18	0
Shakhtar Donetsk	2025–26	Ukrainian Premier League	20	1	1	0	14 (Note: Three appearances in UEFA Europa League, eleven appearances and two goals in UEFA Conference League)	2	–		35	3
Shakhtar Donetsk	2026–27	Ukrainian Premier League	9	1	2	1	3 (Note: Appearances in UEFA Champions League)	0	—		14	2
Shakhtar Donetsk	Total		83	4	9	2	25	2	–		117	8
Career total			175	14	14	2	39	3	0	0	229	19

=== International ===
As of match played 17 November 2026

Appearances and goals by national team and year
National team	Year	Apps	Goals
Ukraine	2023	2	0
Ukraine	2024	0	0
Ukraine	2025	4	0
Ukraine	2026	8	0
Total		14	0

== Honours ==
Individual

- Ukrainian Premier League player of the Month (2): 2019–20 (November), 2020–21 (May)
