= Artem Dovbyk =

Ukrainian footballer (born 1997)

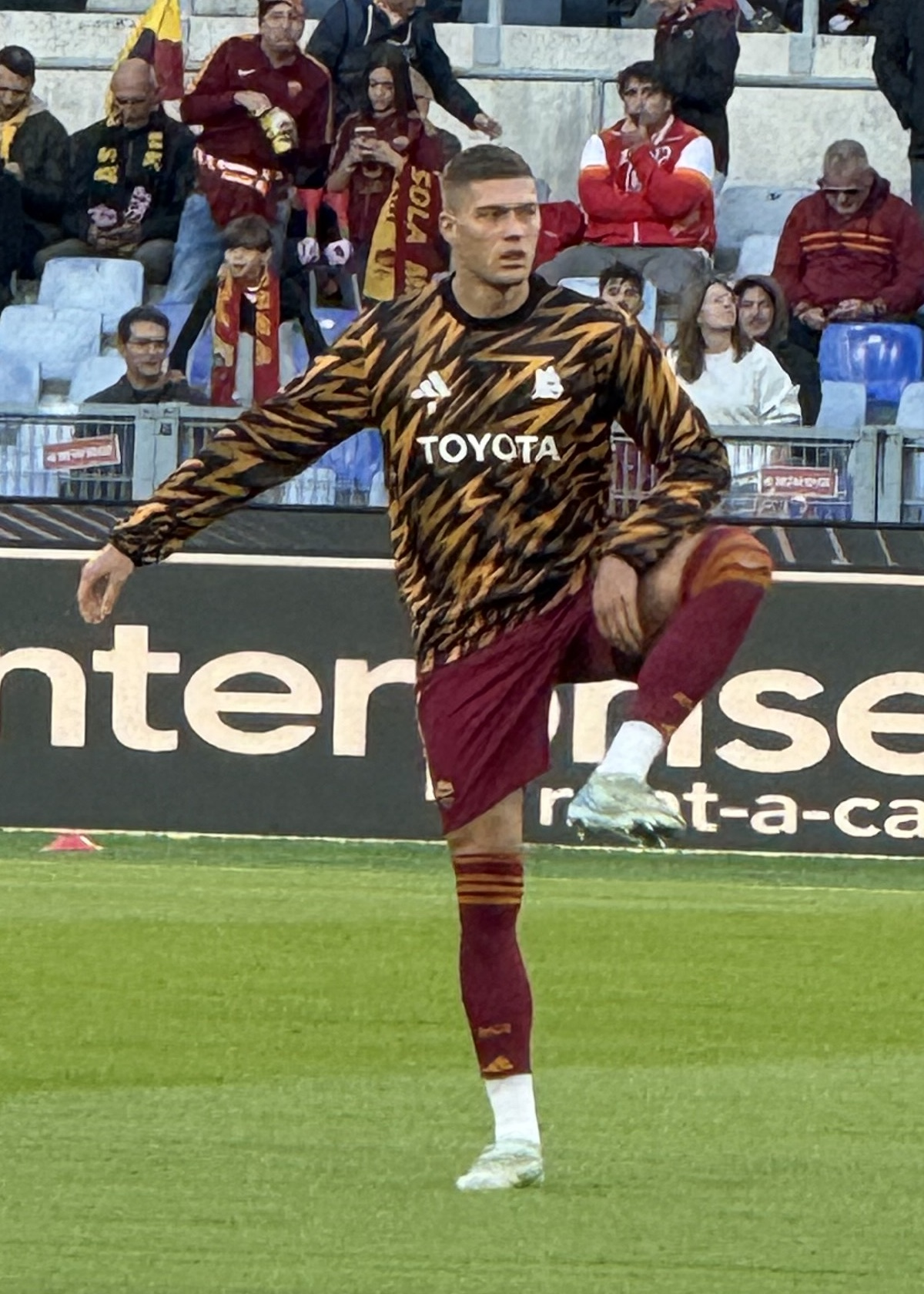
- Dovbyk warming up for Roma in 2025

Personal information
- Full name: Artem Oleksandrovych Dovbyk
- Date of birth: 21 June 1997 (age 29)
- Place of birth: Cherkasy, Ukraine
- Height: 1.89 m (6 ft 2 in)
- Position: Striker

Team information
- Current team: Bologna (on loan from Roma)
- Number: 9

Youth career
- 2010–2014: Cherkaskyi Dnipro

Senior career*
Years	Team	Apps	(Gls)
2014–2015	Cherkaskyi Dnipro	20	(7)
2015–2018	Dnipro	35	(18)
2016–2017	→ Zaria Bălți (loan)	3	(0)
2018–2020	Midtjylland	18	(1)
2019–2020	→ Sønderjyske (loan)	18	(2)
2020–2023	Dnipro-1	71	(44)
2023–2024	Girona	36	(24)
2024–	Roma	46	(15)
2026–	→ Bologna (loan)	4	(1)

International career^{‡}
2015–2016	Ukraine U18	2	(0)
2016–2018	Ukraine U21	6	(1)
2021–	Ukraine	42	(11)
- * Club domestic league appearances and goals as of 20:05, 17 October 2026 (UTC) ‡ National team caps and goals as of 00:50, 15 November 2026 (UTC)

Artem Oleksandrovych Dovbyk (Ukrainian: Арте́м Олекса́ндрович До́вбик; born 21 June 1997) is a Ukrainian professional footballer who plays as a striker for Serie A club Bologna, on loan from Roma, and the Ukraine national team.

== Club career ==
=== Cherkaskyi Dnipro ===
Born in Cherkasy, Ukraine, Dovbyk is a product of the FC Cherkaskyi Dnipro academy after graduating from the Olympic Reserve Specialized Sports School Slavutych in Cherkasy. He made his debut against Skala on 26 July 2014. A month later, on 16 August, he scored his first goal in a 3–1 victory against Krystal Kherson, aged 17 years and 55 days, becoming the youngest scorer for his club in history. Later that year, on 12 October, he scored his first hat-trick in a 5–0 victory over Arsenal Bila Tserkva. He won the 2014–15 Ukrainian Second League, scoring 7 goals.

=== Dnipro ===
In summer 2015, he signed a contract with FC Dnipro, but in April 2016, he was then sent on a three-month loan to Moldovan club FC Zaria Bălți, where he won the Moldovan Cup. He would go on to score a joint team high 6 goals as he won the 2016–17 Ukrainian Premier League Best Young Player award. This prompted Ukraine national team coach Andriy Shevchenko to call him up for 2018 FIFA World Cup qualifiers.

When Dnipro were relegated due to incurring debt, Dovbyk stayed with the club. He would go on to score 12 goals in 13 games in the Ukrainian Second League.

=== Midtjylland ===
Dovbyk's performances gained him interest from foreign clubs, and in 2018 he joined Danish outfit FC Midtjylland on a free transfer. There Dovbyk became a national champion in 2018, and in 2019 becoming a national cupwinner. On 2 September 2019, he was loaned out for the 2019–20 season to Sønderjyske, with whom he won a second Danish cup.

=== Dnipro-1 ===
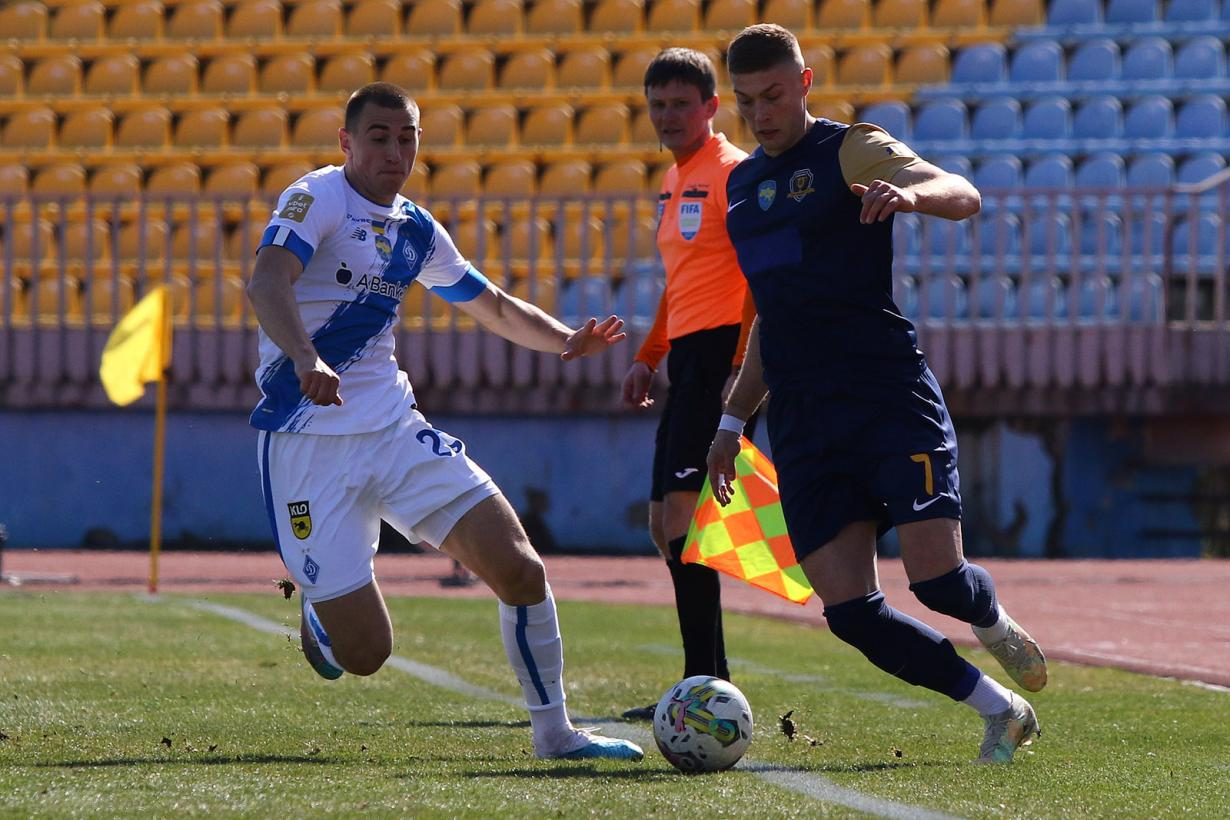
Dovbyk (right) playing for Dnipro-1 in 2023

After lacking regular playing time and dry run-on scoresheet, Dovbyk returned to Ukraine in July 2020 signing with the recently established SC Dnipro-1 that was just promoted to the Ukrainian premiers in previous season. While his league performance was below expectations, Dovbyk made a nice score run in the Ukrainian Cup netting 4 goals in three games, becoming one of the three top scorers in the tournament.

When the 2021–22 season was cancelled at the start of the Russian invasion of Ukraine, Dovbyk made a temporary move to Dynamo Kyiv who were playing charity matches in Europe for the rest of the season to stay in form.

In the 2022–23 season, he scored two hat-tricks for Dnipro-1 against Zorya Luhansk and Kolos Kovalivka, thus becoming only the tenth player in the league's history to achieve this feat. He finished the season as top scorer with 24 goals.

=== Girona ===
On 6 August 2023, Dovbyk signed a five-year contract with La Liga club Girona, for a reported fee of €7m, becoming the most expensive player in the club's history. On 12 August, he scored a goal on his debut in a 1–1 away draw against Real Sociedad. On 21 January 2024, he scored his first hat-trick within six minutes in a 5–1 victory over Sevilla. On 4 May, he scored his 20th goal in La Liga and provided an assist in a 4–2 win over Barcelona, contributing to his club's first ever qualification for the UEFA Champions League. Dovbyk scored his second hat-trick in a 7–0 rout of relegated Granada on 25 May, thereby surpassing Alexander Sørloth to achieve the Pichichi Trophy with 24 goals in his debut season.

=== Roma ===
On 2 August 2024, as one of the top stars of the transfer window, Dovbyk moved to Serie A club Roma for a fee of €38 million. On 15 September, Dovbyk scored his first goal for the club in a 1–1 draw at Genoa. He finished his first season as the team's top scorer, with 12 goals in the league and 17 in all competition.

In July 2025, Dovbyk changed his jersey number from 11 to 9, ahead of the 2025–26 season. On 6 January 2026, he suffered a recurrence of his hamstring injury during a 2–0 away win over Lecce, sidelining him for several months. He returned to action on 17 May during a 2–0 victory over Lazio.

==== Loan to Bologna ====
On 30 July 2026, Dovbyk joined Bologna on loan for the 2026–27 season, with an option for a permanent purchase.

== International career ==
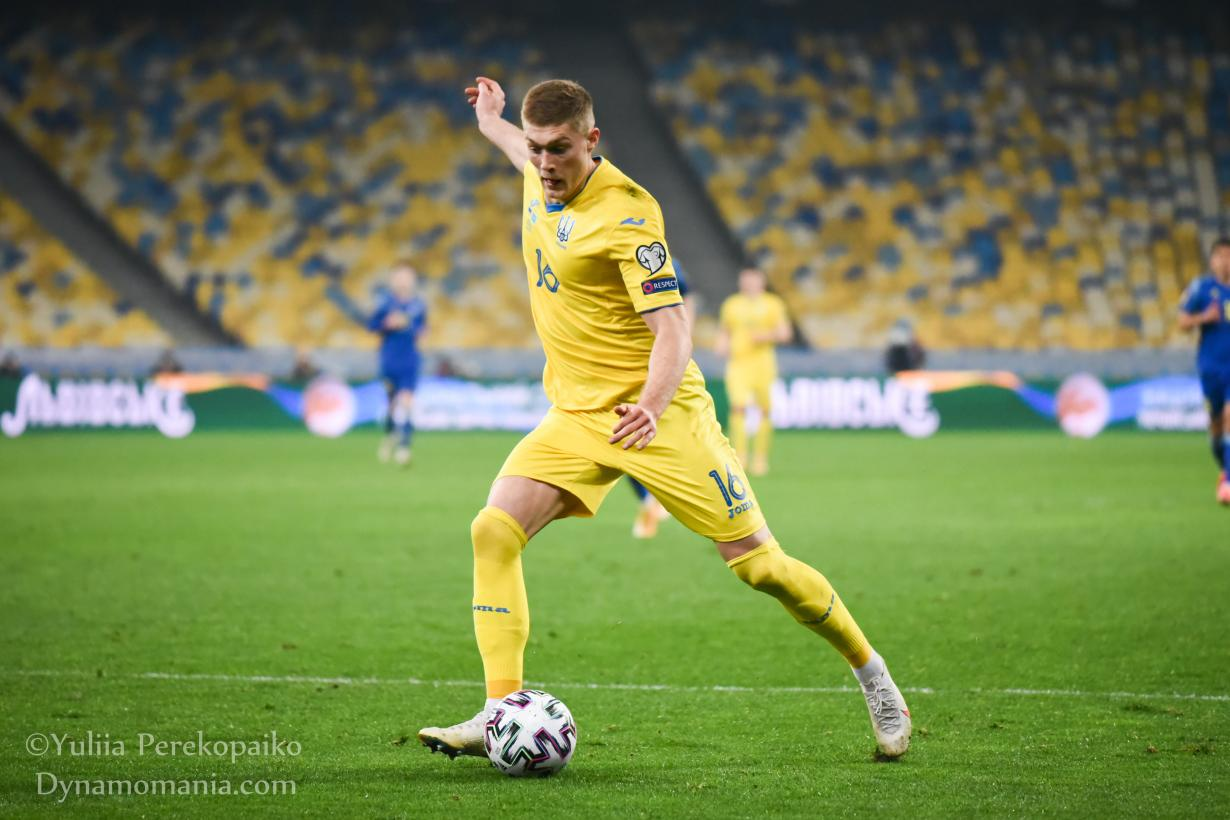
Dovbyk playing for Ukraine in 2021

Dovbyk was called up in the training camp of the Ukraine U19 national team, but did not play any match.

At the age of 19, Dovbyk’s first call-up to the senior national team was announced, when he was named in the 31-player senior squad for the 2018 FIFA World Cup qualification match against Iceland on 5 September 2016. On 31 March 2021, Dovbyk debuted for the Ukrainian senior squad in a World Cup qualifier against Kazakhstan.

Dovbyk was selected for UEFA Euro 2020 on 29 June 2021, coming on as a substitute for Andriy Yarmolenko in the extra time of the round of 16 against Sweden. He scored the winning goal in the stoppage time to secure a 2–1 victory for the Ukraine National Team and helped to advance to the quarter-finals.

In May 2024, Dovbyk was called up to represent Ukraine at UEFA Euro 2024.

== Personal life ==
He is married to Yulia Dovbyk. They have a daughter.

== Career statistics ==
=== Club ===
As of match played 17 October 2026

Appearances and goals by club, season and competition
Club	Season	League			National cup (Note: Includes Ukrainian Cup, Moldovan Cup, Danish Cup, Copa del Rey, Coppa Italia)		Europe		Total	
Club	Season	Division	Apps	Goals	Apps	Goals	Apps	Goals	Apps	Goals
Cherkaskyi Dnipro	2014–15	Ukrainian Second League	20	7	1	0	—		21	7
Dnipro	2015–16	Ukrainian Premier League	0	0	1	0	0	0	1	0
Dnipro	2016–17	Ukrainian Premier League	22	6	1	0	—		23	6
Dnipro	2017–18	Ukrainian Second League	13	12	0	0	—		13	12
Dnipro	Total		35	18	2	0	0	0	37	18
Zaria Bălți (loan)	2015–16	Moldovan National Division	3	0	1	0	—		4	0
Midtjylland	2017–18	Danish Superliga	10	1	2	0	0	0	12	1
Midtjylland	2018–19	Danish Superliga	5	0	1	0	0	0	6	0
Midtjylland	2019–20	Danish Superliga	3	0	0	0	1 (Note: Appearance(s) in UEFA Europa League)	0	4	0
Midtjylland	Total		18	1	3	0	1	0	22	1
Sønderjyske (loan)	2019–20	Danish Superliga	18	2	3	0	—		21	2
Dnipro-1	2020–21	Ukrainian Premier League	24	6	3	4	—		27	10
Dnipro-1	2021–22	Ukrainian Premier League	17	14	1	0	—		18	14
Dnipro-1	2022–23	Ukrainian Premier League	30	24	—		9 (Note: Two appearances in UEFA Europa League, seven appearances and five goals in UEFA Europa Conference League)	5	39	29
Dnipro-1	Total		71	44	4	4	9	5	84	53
Girona	2023–24	La Liga	36	24	3	0	—		39	24
Roma	2024–25	Serie A	32	12	2	3	11	2	45	17
Roma	2025–26	Serie A	14	3	0	0	4	0	18	3
Roma	Total		46	15	2	3	15	2	63	20
Bologna (loan)	2026–27	Serie A	4	1	0	0	—		4	1
Career total			251	112	19	7	25	7	295	126

=== International ===
As of match played 14 November 2026

Appearances and goals by national team and year
National team	Year	Apps	Goals
Ukraine	2021	6	2
Ukraine	2022	8	4
Ukraine	2023	9	1
Ukraine	2024	12	4
Ukraine	2025	5	0
Ukraine	2026	2	0
Total		42	11

As of match played 14 October 2024. Scores and results list Ukraine's goal tally first, score column indicates score after each Dovbyk goal.

List of international goals scored by Artem Dovbyk
No.	Date	Venue	Cap	Opponent	Score	Result	Competition	Ref.
1	29 June 2021	Hampden Park, Glasgow, Scotland	3	Sweden	2–1	2–1 (a.e.t.)	UEFA Euro 2020	
2	16 November 2021	Bilino Polje Stadium, Zenica, Bosnia and Herzegovina	6	Bosnia and Herzegovina	2–0	2–0	2022 FIFA World Cup qualification	
3	1 June 2022	Hampden Park, Glasgow, Scotland	7	Scotland	3–1	3–1	2022 FIFA World Cup qualification	
4	14 June 2022	Stadion Miejski ŁKS, Łódź, Poland	11	Republic of Ireland	1–1	1–1	2022–23 UEFA Nations League B	
5	24 September 2022	Vazgen Sargsyan Republican Stadium, Yerevan, Armenia	13	Armenia	3–0	5–0	2022–23 UEFA Nations League B	
6	24 September 2022	Vazgen Sargsyan Republican Stadium, Yerevan, Armenia	13	Armenia	5–0	5–0	2022–23 UEFA Nations League B	
7	17 October 2023	National Stadium, Ta' Qali, Malta	22	Malta	2–1	3–1	UEFA Euro 2024 qualification	
8	21 March 2024	Bilino Polje Stadium, Zenica, Bosnia and Herzegovina	24	Bosnia and Herzegovina	2–1	2–1	UEFA Euro 2024 qualification	
9	7 June 2024	Stadion Narodowy, Warsaw, Poland	27	Poland	1–3	1–3	Friendly	
10	11 June 2024	Zimbru Stadium, Chișinău, Moldova	28	Moldova	3–0	4–0	Friendly	
11	14 October 2024	Wrocław Stadium, Wrocław, Poland	33	Czech Republic	1–1	1–1	2024–25 UEFA Nations League B	

== Honours ==
Cherkaskyi Dnipro

- Ukrainian Second League: 2014–15

Zaria

- Moldovan Cup: 2016

Midtjylland

- Danish Superliga: 2017–18
- Danish Cup: 2018–19

SønderjyskE

- Danish Cup: 2019–20

Individual

- Ukrainian Premier League top scorer (2): 2021–22, 2022–23
- Pichichi Trophy: 2023–24
- Ukrainian Cup top scorer: 2020–21
- Ukrainian Premier League Best Young Player: 2016–17
- Ukrainian Premier League Player of the Month (5): August 2021, November 2021, October 2022, November–December 2022, April 2023,
- La Liga Player of the Month: December 2023
- La Liga Team of the Season: 2023–24
- La Liga top scorer (1): 2023–24
- Serie A Player of the Month: March 2025
