= Ivan Ponomarenko =

Ukrainian footballer

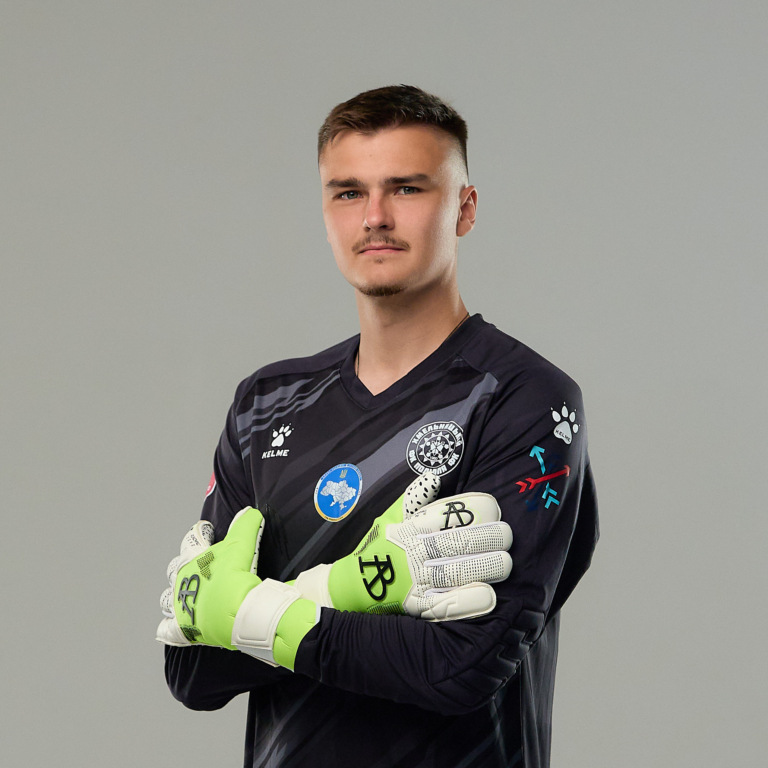

Personal information
- Full name: Ivan Volodymyrovych Ponomarenko
- Date of birth: 10 May 1998 (age 28)
- Place of birth: Orikhove, AR Crimea, Ukraine
- Height: 1.90 m (6 ft 3 in)
- Position: Goalkeeper

Team information
- Current team: Podillya Khmelnytskyi
- Number: 98

Youth career
- 2011–2014: DVUFK Dnipropetrovsk
- 2014–2017: Dnipro

Senior career*
Years	Team	Apps	(Gls)
2015	Inter Dnipropetrovsk	5	(0)
2017–2018	Dnipro	15	(0)
2019	Krymteplytsia Molodizhne	0	(0)
2019	→ Krymteplytsia-2 Molodizhne	1	(0)
2019	Uyutne	7	(0)
2020	CSKA Pamir Dushanbe	18	(0)
2021	Bukovyna Chernivtsi	27	(0)
2022–2023	Lviv	4	(0)
2023	Vorskla Poltava	0	(0)
2023–2025	Bukovyna Chernivtsi	31	(0)
2025–	Podillya Khmelnytskyi	39	(0)
- * Club domestic league appearances and goals as of 4 June 2026

Ivan Ponomarenko (Ukrainian: Іван Володимирович Пономаренко; born 10 May 1998) is a Ukrainian professional footballer who plays as goalkeeper for Podillya Khmelnytskyi.

== Career ==
Born in Saky Raion, Ponomarenko is a product of the DVUFK and FC Dnipro youth academy systems from Dnipro.

Ponomarenko made his debut at professional level in 2017 when Dnipro was in crisis and relegated to the Ukrainian Second League (tier 3) due to administrative sanctions from FFU (later UAF), pressured by FIFA due to the club's financial obligations.

Next season he moved to his native Crimea, at that time occupied by Russia, and participated in the local tier-2 competitions for reserves of Krymteplytsia as well as a village team Uyutne. Because of that fact, in 2023 a public scandal took place when it was announced that Vorskla Poltava signed him. It also became known that to justify his playing statistics in football competitions on the territory of Crimea in 2019, Ponomarenko made a following comment to the FC Lviv press service:

The fact is that after "Dnipro" I was injured, and I did not have money to have an operation in Ukraine. And there was no team at that time, "Dnipro" played in the lowest league at that time. That is why I had the option of having the operation in Crimea, where I live, where my parents are. I did the operation there, but the rehabilitator was not there. I got a call from "Krymteplytsia" and said that they needed a goalkeeper. To help just for training. I said that I will not play in the championship, and they said that the main thing is that you are present. And so, I didn't play a single match, I just trained and recovered.

In 2020 Ponomarenko played in the Central Asia. He spent a season in the 2020 Tajikistan Higher League playing for CSKA Pamir Dushanbe.

During the 2020–21 winter break transfer window, he signed with Bukovyna which played in the 2020–21 Ukrainian Second League (tier 3).

In December 2021 he signed with FC Lviv in the Ukrainian Premier League. His contract was termed for 2.5 years. Ponomarenko made his debut in the Ukrainian Premier League on 25 September 2022 in an away match against FC Mynai which FC Lviv won 1:0 while due to ejection were playing a man down during the course of the game. After a little bit more than a year, in February of 2023 he was transferred to Vorskla Poltava.

In July of 2023 he returned to Bukovyna.
