= Ivan Budnyak =

Ukrainian footballer

Personal information
- Full name: Ivan Serhiyovych Budnyak
- Date of birth: 17 January 1999 (age 27)
- Place of birth: Dnipropetrovsk, Ukraine
- Height: 1.72 m (5 ft 8 in)
- Position: Left winger

Team information
- Current team: Bukovyna
- Number: 11

Youth career
- 2008–2009: DYuSK Olimpik Dnipropetrovsk
- 2009–2015: DYuSSh-12 Dnipropetrovsk
- 2015–2016: Dnipro Dnipropetrovsk

Senior career*
Years	Team	Apps	(Gls)
2015–2019	Dnipro	42	(10)
2019	Khlibozavod Nº9 Dnipro	1	(0)
2019–2022	VPK-Ahro Shevchenkivka	63	(9)
2022	Peremoha Dnipro	0	(0)
2022–2023	Narew Ostrołęka	47	(18)
2023	Nyva Buzova	17	(1)
2024–	Bukovyna	13	(2)

International career
	Ukraine U17	2	(0)
	Ukraine U19	5	(0)
- * Club domestic league appearances and goals as of 1 January 2025

Ivan Serhiyovych Budnyak (Ukrainian: Іван Сергійович Будняк; born 17 January 1999) is a Ukrainian professional footballer who plays as a left winger for Bukovyna.
