= Bohdan Shmyhelskyi =

Ukrainian footballer

Personal information
- Full name: Bohdan Mykolayovych Shmyhelskyi
- Date of birth: 21 December 1993 (age 32)
- Place of birth: Solone, Ukraine
- Height: 1.79 m (5 ft 10 in)
- Position: Right winger

Team information
- Current team: Ahrobiznes Volochysk
- Number: 93

Youth career
- 2008: Yuvileynyi Dnipropetrovsk
- 2008–2009: DYuSSh-Yuvileynyi Tsarychanka

Senior career*
| Years | Team | Apps | (Gls) |
| 2015–2016 | Temp Solone | 12 | (12) |
| 2016–2017 | Petrykivka | 25 | (8) |
| 2017–2018 | Nikopol | 35 | (5) |
| 2019–2021 | VPK-Ahro Shevchenkivka | 58 | (14) |
| 2021–2022 | Alians Lypova Dolyna | 17 | (2) |
| 2022–2023 | Skoruk Tomakivka | 22 | (6) |
| 2023–2025 | Poltava | 23 | (4) |
| 2025– | Ahrobiznes Volochysk | 14 | (0) |
- * Club domestic league appearances and goals as of 3 June 2026

Bohdan Mykolayovych Shmyhelskyi (Ukrainian: Богдан Миколайович Шмигельський; born 21 December 1993) is a Ukrainian professional footballer who plays as a right winger for Ukrainian club Ahrobiznes Volochysk.
