= Artem Tsurupin =

Ukrainian footballer

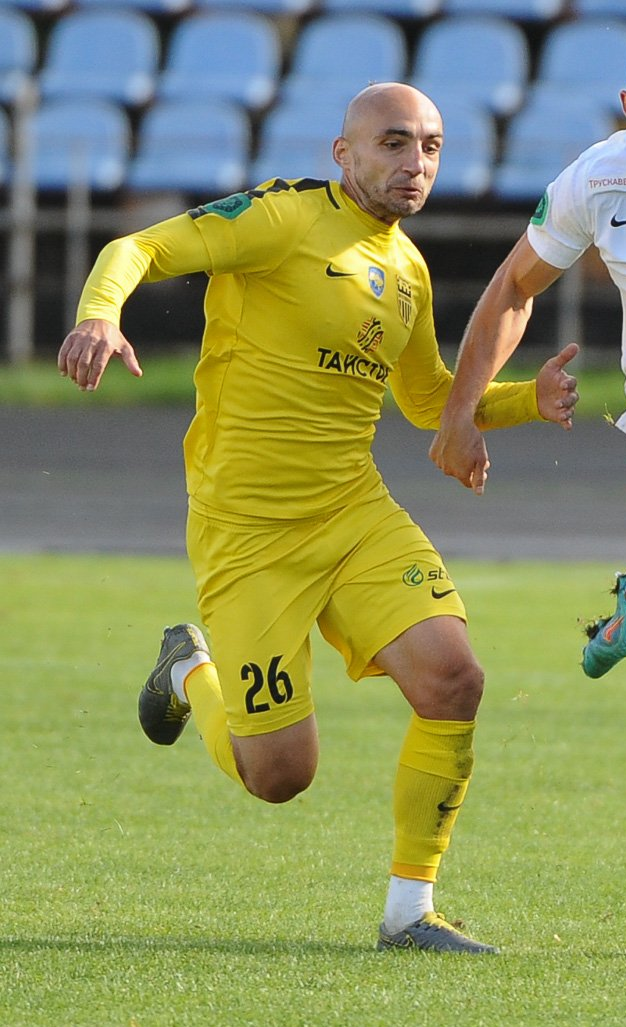

Personal information
- Full name: Artem Hermanovych Tsurupin
- Date of birth: 16 July 1992 (age 34)
- Place of birth: Kyiv, Ukraine
- Height: 1.77 m (5 ft 10 in)
- Position: Central midfielder

Team information
- Current team: Bukovyna Chernivtsi
- Number: 26

Youth career
- 2003–2010: Atlet Kyiv

Senior career*
Years	Team	Apps	(Gls)
2009	Atlet-2 Kyiv		
2010	Ros Bila Tserkva	9	(0)
2011	SKAD-Yalpuh Bolhrad	12	(1)
2013	Chaika Petropavlivska Borshchahivka		
2013	Lehion Kyiv		
2013	Chaika Petropavlivska Borshchahivka		
2014	Arsenal Kyiv		
2015	Chaika Petropavlivska Borshchahivka	9	(1)
2015–2016	Veres Rivne	11	(1)
2016	Hirnyk-Sport Komsomolsk	5	(0)
2016–2017	Myr Hornostayivka	41	(3)
2018–2020	Chaika Petropavlivska Borshchahivka	34	(1)
2020	Cherkashchyna	9	(0)
2020–2021	Rubikon Kyiv	19	(0)
2021–2022	Olimpik Donetsk	18	(0)
2022	Kramatorsk	0	(0)
2022–	Bukovyna Chernivtsi	42	(0)
- * Club domestic league appearances and goals as of 19 June 2024

Artem Hermanovych Tsurupin (Ukrainian: Артем Германович Цурупін; born 16 July 1992) is a Ukrainian professional footballer who plays as a central midfielder for Ukrainian club Bukovyna Chernivtsi.
