= Anatoliy Masalov =

Ukrainian footballer

Personal information
- Full name: Anatoliy Anatoliyovych Masalov
- Date of birth: 17 February 1990 (age 36)
- Place of birth: Novomykolaivka, Kherson Oblast, Soviet Union (now Ukraine)
- Height: 1.75 m (5 ft 9 in)
- Position: Attacking midfielder

Team information
- Current team: Tygrys Huta Mińska
- Number: 9

Youth career
- 2003–2007: UOR Simferopol

Senior career*
Years	Team	Apps	(Gls)
2007–2010	Tytan Armyansk	46	(0)
2011–2012	Krystal Kherson	32	(0)
2012–2013	Sumy	49	(5)
2014	Tytan Armyansk	6	(1)
2014	Stal Alchevsk	15	(1)
2015	Stal Dniprodzerzhynsk	2	(0)
2015–2016	Poltava	26	(2)
2016–2017	Helios Kharkiv	16	(0)
2017–2018	Tavriya Simferopol	43	(7)
2019	Kremin Kremenchuk	25	(0)
2020–2021	Tavriya Simferopol	17	(2)
2021	Mykolaiv	7	(1)
2022–2024	Tygrys Huta Mińska	69	(12)
2025–	Tygrys Huta Mińska	26	(2)
- * Club domestic league appearances and goals as of 16:39, 30 June 2026 (UTC)

Anatoliy Anatoliyovych Masalov (Ukrainian: Анатолій Анатолійович Масалов; born 17 February 1990) is a Ukrainian professional footballer who plays as an attacking midfielder for V liga Masovia club Tygrys Huta Mińska.

== Career ==
Masalov is a product of the UOR Simferopol youth sportive school. He played for different Ukrainian First League clubs. In June 2015 he signed a contract with FC Poltava.

== Honours ==
Tygrys Huta Mińska

- V liga Masovia II: 2023–24
- Polish Cup (Siedlce regionals): 2022–23
