= Vadym Voronchenko =

Ukrainian footballer

Personal information
- Full name: Vadym Anatoliyovych Voronchenko
- Date of birth: 11 January 1989 (age 37)
- Place of birth: Hlobyne, Ukrainian SSR
- Height: 1.81 m (5 ft 11 1/2 in)
- Position: Midfielder

Youth career
- –2006: Dynamo Kyiv

Senior career*
Years	Team	Apps	(Gls)
2006–2008	Dynamo Kyiv	0	(0)
2006–2008	→ Dynamo-2 Kyiv	4	(0)
2006–2008	→ Dynamo-3 Kyiv	38	(1)
2008–2009	Oleksandriya	16	(3)
2009–2010	Mykolaiv	12	(0)
2010	Nove Zhyttya Andriivka		
2011	FC Putrivka	3	(0)
2012	Zhemchuzhina Yalta	3	(0)
2012–2015	Desna Chernihiv	31	(1)
2014–2015	FC Hlobyne		
2015–2016	Hirnyk-Sport Komsomolsk	30	(2)
2017	Poltava	9	(1)
2017–2018	Tavriya Simferopol	48	(26)
2019	Metalurh Zaporizhya	9	(2)
2019	Kremin Kremenchuk	18	(1)
2020	Tavriya Simferopol		
2020–2021	Speranța Nisporeni	22	(1)
- * Club domestic league appearances and goals as of 20 August 2021

Vadym Voronchenko (Ukrainian: Вадим Анатолійович Воронченко; born 11 January 1989) is a professional Ukrainian football midfielder.

== Career ==
Native of Poltava Oblast, Voronechenko is a product of FC Dynamo Kyiv.

He made his professional debut for FC Dynamo-2 Kyiv in the Ukrainian First League.

== Hounours ==
Desna Chernihiv

- Ukrainian Second League: 2012–13
