= Dmytro Semenov =

Ukrainian footballer

Personal information
- Full name: Dmytro Kostyantynovych Semenov
- Date of birth: 4 November 1999 (age 27)
- Place of birth: Dnipropetrovsk, Ukraine
- Height: 1.76 m (5 ft 9 in)
- Position: Defender

Team information
- Current team: Kudrivka
- Number: 50

Youth career
- 2012–2016: Dnipro Dnipropetrovsk

Senior career*
| Years | Team | Apps | (Gls) |
| 2016–2018 | Dnipro | 29 | (3) |
| 2018–2021 | Oleksandriya | 0 | (0) |
| 2019 | → Mykolaiv (loan) | 11 | (0) |
| 2020 | → Jelgava (loan) | 18 | (0) |
| 2021 | → Kremin Kremenchuk (loan) | 13 | (2) |
| 2021–2024 | Kryvbas Kryvyi Rih | 26 | (2) |
| 2024–2025 | Livyi Bereh Kyiv | 24 | (1) |
| 2025–2026 | Obolon Kyiv | 29 | (0) |
| 2025– | Kudrivka | 8 | (0) |
- * Club domestic league appearances and goals as of 7 November 2026

Dmytro Kostyantynovych Semenov (Ukrainian: Дмитро Костянтинович Семенов; born 4 November 1999) is a Ukrainian football player who plays for Kudrivka.

== Club career ==
He made his Ukrainian Second League debut for Dnipro on 15 July 2017 in a game against Real Pharma Odesa.

On 18 July 2026, he signed for Kudrivka in Ukrainian Premier League.
