= 2023–24 FC Polissya Zhytomyr season =

Polissya Zhytomyr
2023–24 season
- Manager: Yuriy Kalitvintsev (until 11 March); Serhiy Shyshchenko (caretaker, from 11 March)
- Stadium: Tsentralnyi Stadion
- Ukrainian Premier League: 5th
- Ukrainian Cup: Semi-finals

The 2023–24 season was the 55th season in the history of Polissya Zhytomyr and the first-ever season in the Ukrainian Premier League. The team also participated in the Ukrainian Cup.

== Friendlies ==
25 June 2023 Friendly	Sepsi OSK (Romania)	1–0	(Ukraine) Polissya Zhytomyr

30 June 2023 Friendly	Oțelul Galați (Romania)	2–2	(Ukraine) Polissya Zhytomyr

8 July 2023 Friendly	Rapid Wien (Austria)	1–1	(Ukraine) Polissya Zhytomyr

12 July 2023 Friendly	Hartberg (Austria)	2–3	(Ukraine) Polissya Zhytomyr

15 July 2023 Friendly	Grazer AK (Austria)	1–4	(Ukraine) Polissya Zhytomyr

22 July 2023 Friendly	Kolos Kovalivka (Ukraine)	3–3	(Ukraine) Polissya Zhytomyr

23 January 2024 Friendly	Real Murcia (Spain)	1–2	(Ukraine) Polissya Zhytomyr

27 January 2024 Friendly	Stal Mielec (Poland)	1–1	(Ukraine) Polissya Zhytomyr

2 February 2024 Friendly	Kalmar (Sweden)	1–0	(Ukraine) Polissya Zhytomyr

7 February 2024 Friendly	Polissya Zhytomyr (Ukraine)	1–1	(Iceland) Stjarnan

17 February 2024 Friendly	Polissya Zhytomyr (Ukraine)	1–0	(Ukraine) Livyi Bereh Kyiv

== Competitions ==
=== Overall record ===
Competition	First match	Last match	Starting round	Final position	Record							
Competition	First match	Last match	Starting round	Final position	Pld	W	D	L	GF	GA	GD	Win %
Ukrainian Premier League	28 July 2023	25 May 2024	Matchday 1	5th	30	14	8	8	39	30	+9	46.67
Ukrainian Cup	23 August 2023	4 April 2024	Fourth preliminary round	Semi-finals	4	1	2	1	3	2	+1	25.00
Total					34	15	10	9	42	32	+10	44.12

Source: Competitions

=== Ukrainian Premier League ===
==== League table ====
Pos	Team	Pld	W	D	L	GF	GA	GD	Pts	Qualification or relegation
3	Kryvbas Kryvyi Rih	30	17	6	7	51	30	+21	57	Qualification for the Europa League third qualifying round (Note: Since the 2023–24 Ukrainian Cup winners (Shakhtar Donetsk) finished in the top two, the Europa League spot was passed to the third-placed team, and the second Conference League second qualifying round spot was passed to the fifth-placed team.)
4	Dnipro-1 (D)	30	14	10	6	40	27	+13	52	Withdrew after the season (Note: SC Dnipro-1 that withdrew from all tournaments of the 2024–25 season due to financial hardship after finishing 4th in the league qualified for the Conference League second qualifying round, however it was awarded technical losses in both matches (0:3).)
5	Polissya Zhytomyr	30	14	8	8	39	30	+9	50	Qualification for the Conference League second qualifying round
6	Rukh Lviv	30	12	13	5	44	31	+13	49	
7	LNZ Cherkasy	30	11	8	11	31	34	−3	41	

Source: upl.ua
Rules for classification: 1) Points; 2) Head-to-head points; 3) Head-to-head goal difference; 4) Head-to-head goals scored; 5) Goal difference; 6) Goals scored; 7) Draw or "Golden match" if two teams tied for title (Article 22, paragraph 3).
(D) Disqualified

==== Results summary ====
Overall								Home						Away					
Pld	W	D	L	GF	GA	GD	Pts	W	D	L	GF	GA	GD	W	D	L	GF	GA	GD
30	14	8	8	39	30	+9	50	7	4	4	19	16	+3	7	4	4	20	14	+6

Source: Worldfootball

==== Results by round ====
Round	1	2	3	4	5	6	7	8	9	10	11	12	13	14	15	16	17	18	19	20	21	22	23	24	25	26	27	28	29	30
Ground	A	A	H	A	A	H	A	H	A	H	A	A	H	H	A	H	H	A	H	H	A	H	A	H	A	H	H	A	A	H
Result	W	L	L	W	W	W	L	W	D	W	W	W	D	W	D	D	D	D	L	L	L	L	W	W	L	W	D	W	D	W
Position	2	7	9	9	5	3	4	4	5	5	5	4	4	3	5	5	5	5	5	5	6	6	6	6	6	6	6	6	6	5

Source: Worldfootball
A = Away; H = Home; W = Win; D = Draw; L = Loss

==== Matches ====
28 July 2023 1	Veres	0–2	Polissya Zhytomyr

6 August 2023 2	Dnipro-1	2–1	Polissya Zhytomyr

12 August 2023 3	Polissya Zhytomyr	0–1	Rukh Lviv

18 August 2023 4	LNZ Cherkasy	1–2	Polissya Zhytomyr

26 August 2023 5	Oleksandriya	0–3	Polissya Zhytomyr

2 September 2023 6	Polissya Zhytomyr	2–0	Obolon

16 September 2023 7	Chernomorets Odessa	1–0	Polissya Zhytomyr

23 September 2023 8	Polissya Zhytomyr	2–1	Mynai

1 October 2023 9	Kolos Kovalivka	0–0	Polissya Zhytomyr

6 October 2023 10	Polissya Zhytomyr	3–2	Dynamo Kyiv

22 October 2023 11	Vorskla Poltava	0–3	Polissya Zhytomyr

28 October 2023 12	Zorya Luhansk	0–1	Polissya Zhytomyr

6 November 2023 13	Polissya Zhytomyr	1–1	Kryvbas Kryvyi Rih

11 November 2023 14	Polissya Zhytomyr	2–1	Metalist 1925 Kharkiv

24 November 2023 15	Shakhtar Donetsk	0–0	Polissya Zhytomyr

1 December 2023 16	Polissya Zhytomyr	1–1	Veres

8 December 2023 17	Polissya Zhytomyr	1–1	Dnipro-1

25 February 2024 18	Rukh Lviv	1–1	Polissya Zhytomyr

1 March 2024 19	Polissya Zhytomyr	0–1	LNZ Cherkasy

9 March 2024 20	Polissya Zhytomyr	1–2	Oleksandriya

16 March 2024 21	Obolon	1–0	Polissya Zhytomyr

30 March 2024 22	Polissya Zhytomyr	1–4	Chernomorets Odessa

8 April 2024 23	Mynai	2–3	Polissya Zhytomyr

14 April 2024 24	Polissya Zhytomyr	1–0	Kolos Kovalivka

21 April 2024 25	Dynamo Kyiv	3–0	Polissya Zhytomyr

29 April 2024 26	Polissya Zhytomyr	1–0	Vorskla Poltava

5 May 2024 27	Polissya Zhytomyr	1–1	Zorya Luhansk

13 May 2024 28	Kryvbas Kryvyi Rih	0–1	Polissya Zhytomyr

19 May 2024 29	Metalist 1925 Kharkiv	3–3	Polissya Zhytomyr

25 May 2024 30	Polissya Zhytomyr	2–0	Shakhtar Donetsk

=== Ukrainian Cup ===
23 August 2023 Fourth preliminary round	Ahrobiznes Volochysk	0–2	Polissya Zhytomyr	Volochysk
		Report		Stadium: Stadion Yunist

27 September 2023 Round of 16	Polissya Zhytomyr	1–1 (5–4 p)	Dnipro-1	Zhytomyr
		Report		Stadium: Tsentralnyi Stadion

2 November 2023 Quarter-finals	Polissya Zhytomyr	0–0 (4–3 p)	Oleksandriya	Zhytomyr
		Report		Stadium: Tsentralnyi Stadion

4 April 2024 Semi-finals	Polissya Zhytomyr	0–1	Vorskla Poltava	Zhytomyr
		Report	45'	Stadium: Tsentralnyi Stadion
