= Oleksiy Bashtanenko =

Ukrainian football goalkeeper

Personal information
- Full name: Oleksiy Volodymyrovych Bashtanenko
- Date of birth: 16 March 1994 (age 32)
- Place of birth: Dnipropetrovsk, Ukraine
- Height: 1.88 m (6 ft 2 in)
- Position: Goalkeeper

Team information
- Current team: Nikopol
- Number: 77

Youth career
- 2006–2007: Youth Sportive School #2 Dnipropetrovsk
- 2007–2011: Dnipro Dnipropetrovsk

Senior career*
Years	Team	Apps	(Gls)
2011–2018	Dnipro	18	(0)
2011	→ Dnipro-2 Dnipropetrovsk	4	(0)
2018	Kobra Kharkiv	3	(0)
2018	Hirnyk-Sport Horishni Plavni	0	(0)
2021–	Nikopol	6	(0)

International career^{‡}
2010–2011	Ukraine-17	6	(0)
2012	Ukraine-19	1	(0)
- * Club domestic league appearances and goals as of 1 May 2022 ‡ National team caps and goals as of 19 July 2017

Oleksiy Bashtanenko (Ukrainian: Олексій Володимирович Баштаненко; born 16 March 1994) is a Ukrainian professional football goalkeeper who plays for Nikopol.

== Career ==
Bashtanenko is a product of Youth Sportive School #2 Dnipropetrovsk and FC Dnipro.

From 2011, after graduation from the youth sportive school, he played in the FC Dnipro Dnipropetrovsk reserves. In the main-team squad Bashtanenko made his debut as a start-squad player in the match against FC Zirka Kropyvnytskyi on 17 September 2016 in the Ukrainian Premier League.
