= Arsentiy Doroshenko =

Ukrainian footballer (born 2000)

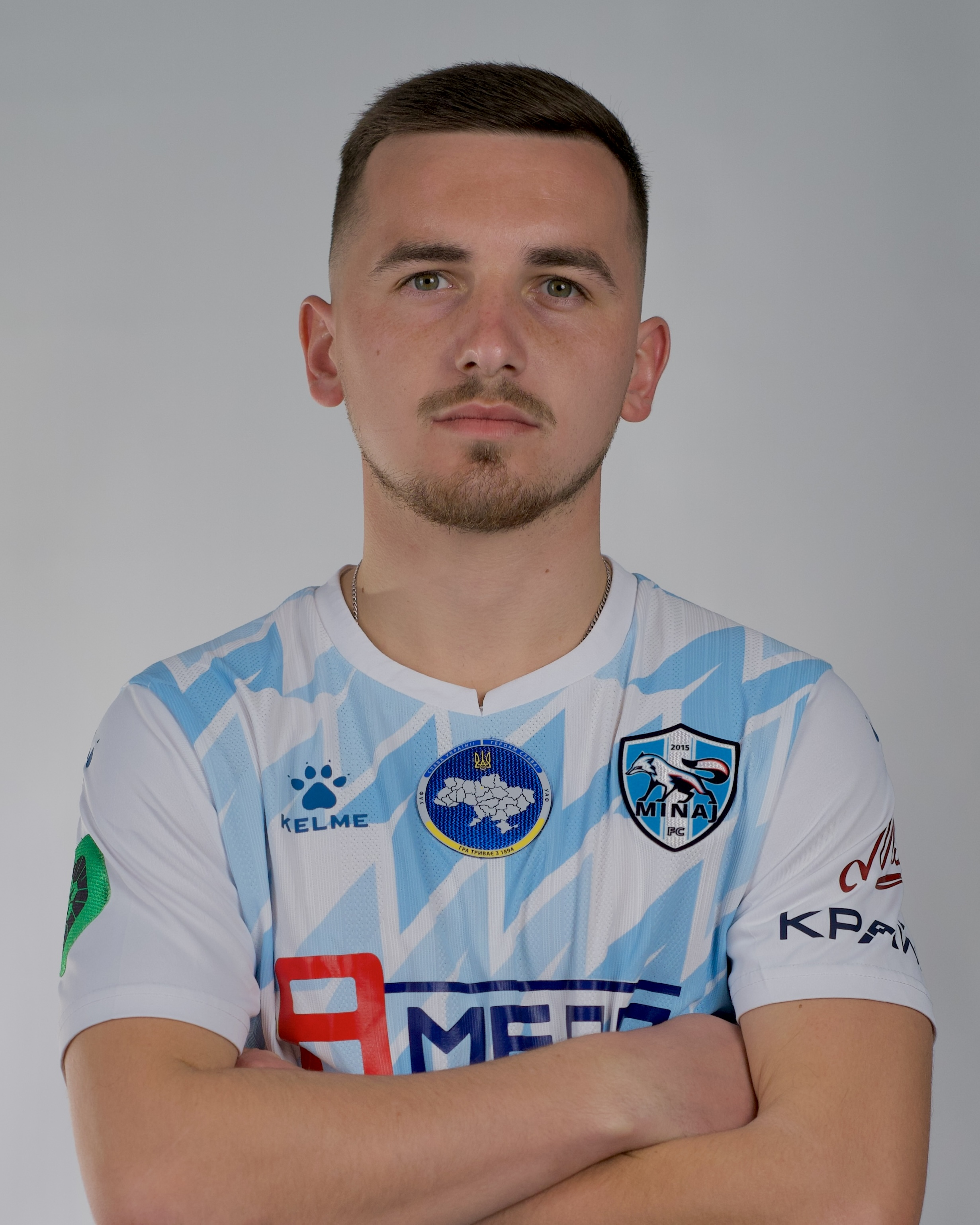
- Doroshenko in 2025

Personal information
- Full name: Arsentiy Oleksandrovych Doroshenko
- Date of birth: 27 June 2000 (age 26)
- Place of birth: Dnipropetrovsk, Ukraine
- Height: 1.76 m (5 ft 9 1/2 in)
- Position: Attacking midfielder

Team information
- Current team: Ogre United
- Number: 21

Youth career
- 2011–2017: Inter Dnipro
- 2017: Dnipro
- 2018–2019: Kolos Kovalivka

Senior career*
Years	Team	Apps	(Gls)
2017–2018	Dnipro	16	(3)
2018–2022	Kolos Kovalivka	9	(1)
2019–2020	→ Podillya Khmelnytskyi (loan)	14	(1)
2020–2022	→ Kramatorsk (loan)	32	(3)
2022–2025	Nyva Ternopil	50	(2)
2025	Mynai	7	(0)
2025–2026	Poltava	22	(1)
2026–	Ogre United	17	(0)
- * Club domestic league appearances and goals as of 12 November 2026

Arsentiy Oleksandrovych Doroshenko (Ukrainian: Арсентій Олександрович Дорошенко) is a professional Ukrainian footballer who plays as an attacking midfielder for Latvian club Ogre United. He was born on 27 June 2000
