= Viktor Babichyn =

Ukrainian footballer (born 2000)

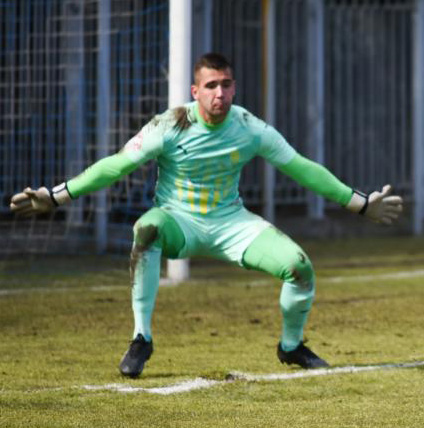
- Viktor Babichyn playing for Rukh Lviv U-21 in 2021

Personal information
- Full name: Viktor Viktorovych Babichyn
- Date of birth: 22 August 2000 (age 26)
- Place of birth: Zaporizhzhia, Ukraine
- Height: 1.91 m (6 ft 3 in)
- Position: Goalkeeper

Youth career
- 2011–2013: Metalurh Zaporizhya
- 2013–2017: Dnipro

Senior career*
Years	Team	Apps	(Gls)
2017	Dnipro	3	(0)
2017–2020	Dnipro-1	4	(0)
2020–2023	Rukh Lviv	0	(0)
2021	→ VPK-Ahro Shevchenkivka (loan)	8	(0)
2022–2023	→ Standart Novi Sanzhary (loan)		

International career^{‡}
2015–2017	Ukraine U17	22	(0)
2017	Ukraine U18	1	(0)
- * Club domestic league appearances and goals as of 12 January 2022 ‡ National team caps and goals as of 1 May 2021

Viktor Babichyn (Ukrainian: Віктор Вікторович Бабічин; born 22 August 2000) is a professional Ukrainian football goalkeeper.

== Career ==
Babichyn is a product of FC Metalurh Zaporizhya in his native Zaporizhzhia with first trainer Vladyslav Zakharchenko and FC Dnipro youth sportive school systems.

After spent five seasons in FC Dnipro and SC Dnipro-1 and played in the Ukrainian Second League, Ukrainian First League and Ukrainian Premier League Reserves, he signed a contract with Rukh Lviv in September 2020.
