= Vladyslav Krayev =

Ukrainian footballer

Personal information
- Full name: Vladyslav Serhiyovych Krayev
- Date of birth: 5 February 1995 (age 31)
- Place of birth: Ukraine
- Height: 1.68 m (5 ft 6 in)
- Position: Midfielder

Team information
- Current team: Phönix Lübeck
- Number: 21

Youth career
- 2008–2012: Metalist Kharkiv

Senior career*
Years	Team	Apps	(Gls)
2012–2016	Metalist Kharkiv	4	(0)
2016–2019	Metalist 1925 Kharkiv	47	(10)
2018–2019	→ Dinamo-Auto Tiraspol (loan)	19	(3)
2019–2020	Vovchansk	5	(1)
2020–2021	Telavi	0	(0)
2021–2022	Metalist Kharkiv	0	(0)
2021	→ Hirnyk-Sport Horishni Plavni (loan)	11	(2)
2021–2022	→ Peremoha Dnipro (loan)	15	(0)
2022–2023	Rostocker	17	(4)
2023–	Phönix Lübeck	41	(4)
- * Club domestic league appearances and goals as of 20 June 2026

Vladyslav Krayev (Ukrainian: Владислав Сергійович Краєв; born 5 February 1995) is a professional Ukrainian football midfielder who plays for German Regionalliga Nord club Phönix Lübeck.

== Career ==
Krayev is a product of the FC Metalist youth sportive school system.

He spent his career in the Ukrainian Premier League Reserves club FC Metalist. In spring 2016 Krayev was promoted to the Ukrainian Premier League's squad. He made his debut for Metalist Kharkiv in the Ukrainian Premier League in a match against FC Stal Dniprodzerzhynsk on 23 April 2016.
