= Denys Taraduda =

Ukrainian footballer (born 2000)

Personal information
- Full name: Denys Olehovych Taraduda
- Date of birth: 17 August 2000 (age 26)
- Place of birth: Rozivka, Telmanove Raion, Donetsk Oblast, Ukraine
- Height: 1.87 m (6 ft 2 in)
- Position: Centre-back

Team information
- Current team: Teplice
- Number: 13

Youth career
- –2014: Illichivets Mariupol
- 2014–2017: Dnipro Dnipropetrovsk

Senior career*
Years	Team	Apps	(Gls)
2017–2018	Dnipro Dnipropetrovsk	21	(0)
2018–2020	Vorskla Poltava	1	(0)
2020–2021	Vovchansk	7	(0)
2021	SKA-Khabarovsk	4	(0)
2021–2022	VPK-Ahro Shevchenkivka	7	(0)
2022	Narva Trans	18	(0)
2023	Dainava	31	(1)
2024	Ceahlăul Piatra Neamț	10	(0)
2024–2025	Zemplín Michalovce	31	(2)
2025–2026	Spartak Trnava	0	(0)
2026	→ Tatran Prešov (loan)	11	(1)
2026–	Teplice	0	(0)

International career
2016–2017	Ukraine U17	7	(0)
- * Club domestic league appearances and goals as of 16 May 2026

Denys Olehovych Taraduda (Ukrainian: Денис Олегович Тарадуда; born 17 August 2000) is a Ukrainian professional footballer who plays as a centre-back for Czech club Teplice.

== Club career ==
He made his Ukrainian Second League debut for Dnipro on 15 July 2017 in a game against Real Pharma Odesa. In the summer of 2022, he moved to Narva Trans in Estonia. On 6 June 2025 it was announced that Taraduda would be signing a 3-year contract with Slovak side FC Spartak Trnava. On 15 January 2026, he joined fellow league outfit Tatran Presov on a half-year loan after only making one appearance for Spartak in the Slovak cup against AC Nitra.

== Honours ==
Vorskla Poltava

- Ukrainian Cup runner-up: 2019–20
