= Maksym Voytikhovskyi =

Ukrainian footballer

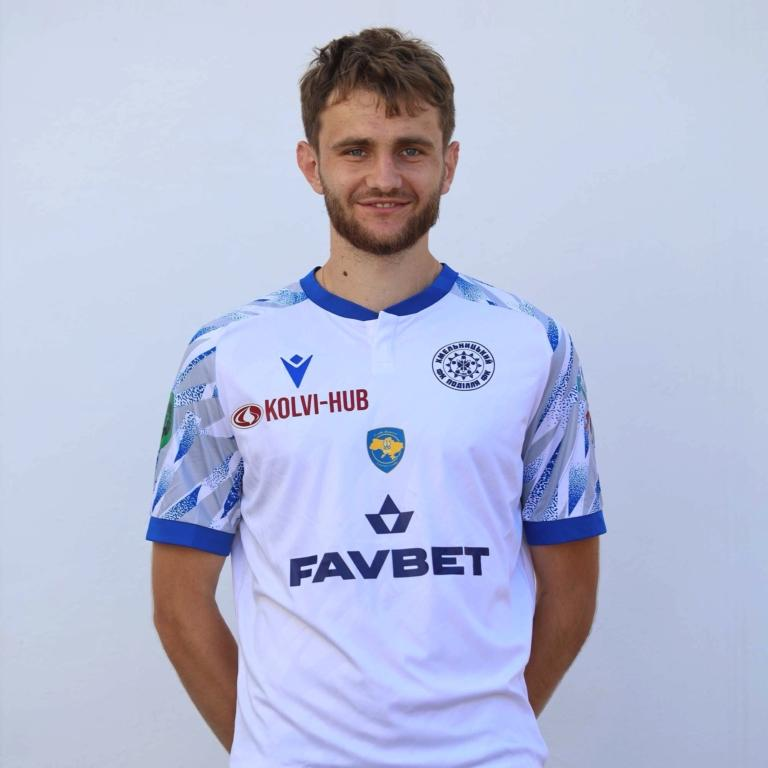

Personal information
- Full name: Maksym Ihorovych Voytikhovskyi
- Date of birth: 7 January 1999 (age 27)
- Place of birth: Ternopil, Ukraine
- Height: 1.99 m (6 ft 6 in)
- Position: Forward

Team information
- Current team: Oleksandriya
- Number: 99

Youth career
- 2012–2013: DYuSSh Ternopil
- 2013–2016: Dnipro Dnipropetrovsk

Senior career*
| Years | Team | Apps | (Gls) |
| 2016–2018 | Dnipro | 22 | (0) |
| 2018–2020 | Chornomorets Odesa | 6 | (0) |
| 2019 | → Chornomorets-2 Odesa | 6 | (1) |
| 2020 | Shakhtar Donetsk | 0 | (0) |
| 2020–2022 | Volyn Lutsk | 45 | (2) |
| 2020–2021 | → Volyn-2 Lutsk | 4 | (3) |
| 2022–2023 | Chornomorets Odesa | 14 | (1) |
| 2023–2024 | Podillya Khmelnytskyi | 14 | (2) |
| 2024–2026 | Ahrobiznes Volochysk | 47 | (18) |
| 2026 | Bukovyna Chernivtsi | 15 | (3) |
| 2026– | Oleksandriya | 1 | (0) |

International career^{‡}
| 2014 | Ukraine U17 | 1 | (0) |
- * Club domestic league appearances and goals as of 10 September 2026 ‡ National team caps and goals as of 1 July 2022

Maksym Ihorovych Voytikhovskyi (Ukrainian: Максим Ігорович Войтіховський; born 7 January 1999) is a Ukrainian professional footballer who plays as a centre-forward for Ukrainian club Oleksandriya.
