= Maksym Solovyov =

Ukrainian footballer

Personal information
- Full name: Maksym Valeriyovych Solovyov
- Date of birth: 22 February 2002 (age 24)
- Place of birth: Kharkiv, Ukraine
- Height: 1.80 m (5 ft 11 in)
- Position: Defensive midfielder

Team information
- Current team: Prykarpattia Ivano-Frankivsk
- Number: 10

Youth career
- 2013–2015: Metalist Kharkiv
- 2015–2019: Dnipro

Senior career*
Years	Team	Apps	(Gls)
2019–2023	Dnipro-1	0	(0)
2021–2022	→ Nikopol (loan)	18	(2)
2022	→ Prykarpattia Ivano-Frankivsk (loan)	20	(0)
2023–	Prykarpattia Ivano-Frankivsk	77	(1)

International career^{‡}
2018	Ukraine U16	3	(0)
2018	Ukraine U17	2	(0)
- * Club domestic league appearances and goals as of 4 June 2026 ‡ National team caps and goals as of 9 September 2022

Maksym Valeriyovych Solovyov (Ukrainian: Максим Валерійович Соловйов; born 22 February 2002) is a Ukrainian professional footballer who plays as a defensive midfielder for Prykarpattia Ivano-Frankivsk.

== Career ==
Born in Kharkiv, Solovyov is a product of the local Metalist Kharkiv and also Dnipro academies and in August 2019 he signed a contract with Ukrainian side Dnipro-1 and played for its in the Ukrainian Premier League Reserves and Under 19 Championship.

Starting from July 2021, he played on loan first as a main choice midfielder of Nikopol in the Ukrainian Second League, and later in Prykarpattia Ivano-Frankivsk in the Ukrainian First League.
