= Serhiy Zayets (footballer, born 2001) =

Ukrainian footballer

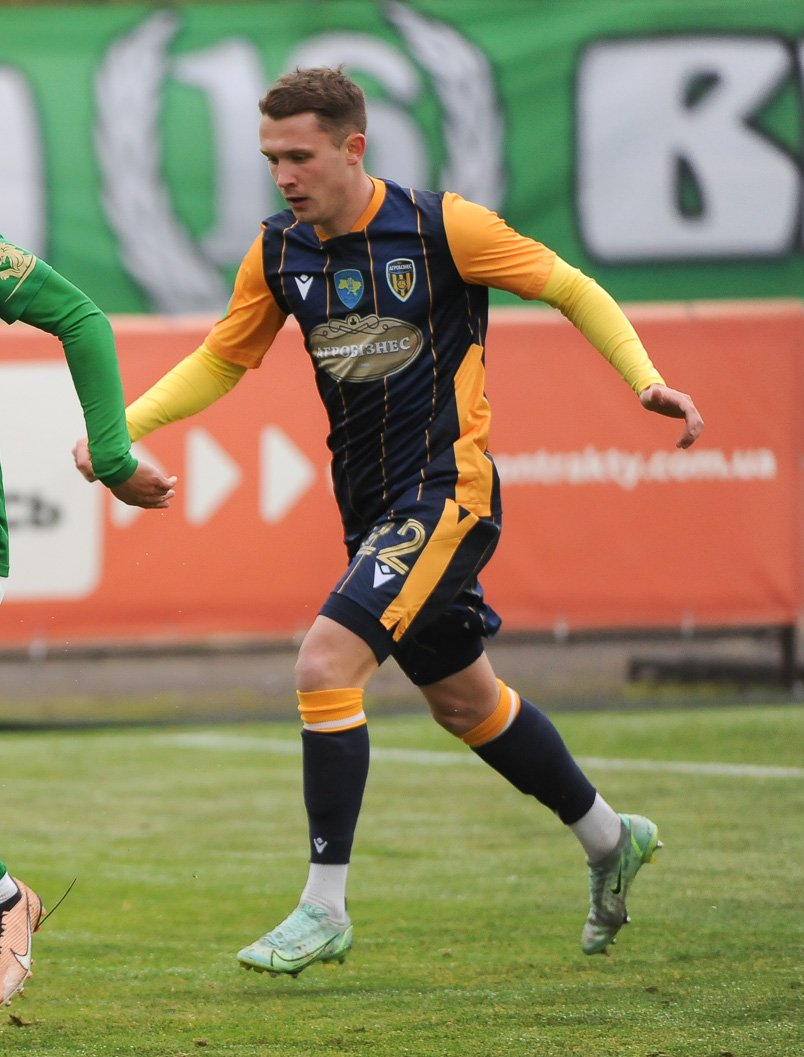

Personal information
- Full name: Serhiy Serhiyovych Zayets
- Date of birth: 3 October 2001 (age 25)
- Place of birth: Kyiv, Ukraine
- Height: 1.75 m (5 ft 9 in)
- Position: Defender

Team information
- Current team: Podillya Khmelnytskyi
- Number: 22

Youth career
- Dynamo Kyiv
- 2013–2014: Zirka Kyiv
- 2014–2018: Dnipro

Senior career*
Years	Team	Apps	(Gls)
2018–2019	Dnipro	18	(0)
2019–2022	Dnipro-1	1	(0)
2021–2022	→ Nikopol (loan)	19	(0)
2022–2023	Skoruk Tomakivka	16	(0)
2023–2024	Ahrobiznes Volochysk	30	(1)
2025–	Podillya Khmelnytskyi	13	(0)
- * Club domestic league appearances and goals as of 4 June 2026

Serhiy Serhiyovych Zayets (Ukrainian: Сергій Сергійович Заєць; born 3 October 2001) is a Ukrainian professional footballer who plays as a defender for Podillya Khmelnytskyi.

== Career ==
Zayets is a product of the Dynamo and Zirka youth sportive schools in his native city Kyiv, and also of the Dnipro youth sportive school and in July 2019 he signed a contract with Ukrainian side SC Dnipro-1 and played for its in the Ukrainian Premier League Reserves and Under 19 Championship.

In December 2020 he was promoted to the main squad to play in the Ukrainian Premier League. Zayets made his debut in the Ukrainian Premier League for SC Dnipro-1 as a second-half substituted player on 6 December 2020, playing in a losing away match against FC Zorya Luhansk.
