= 2024–25 FC Kudrivka season =

Football club season

Kudrivka
2024–25 season
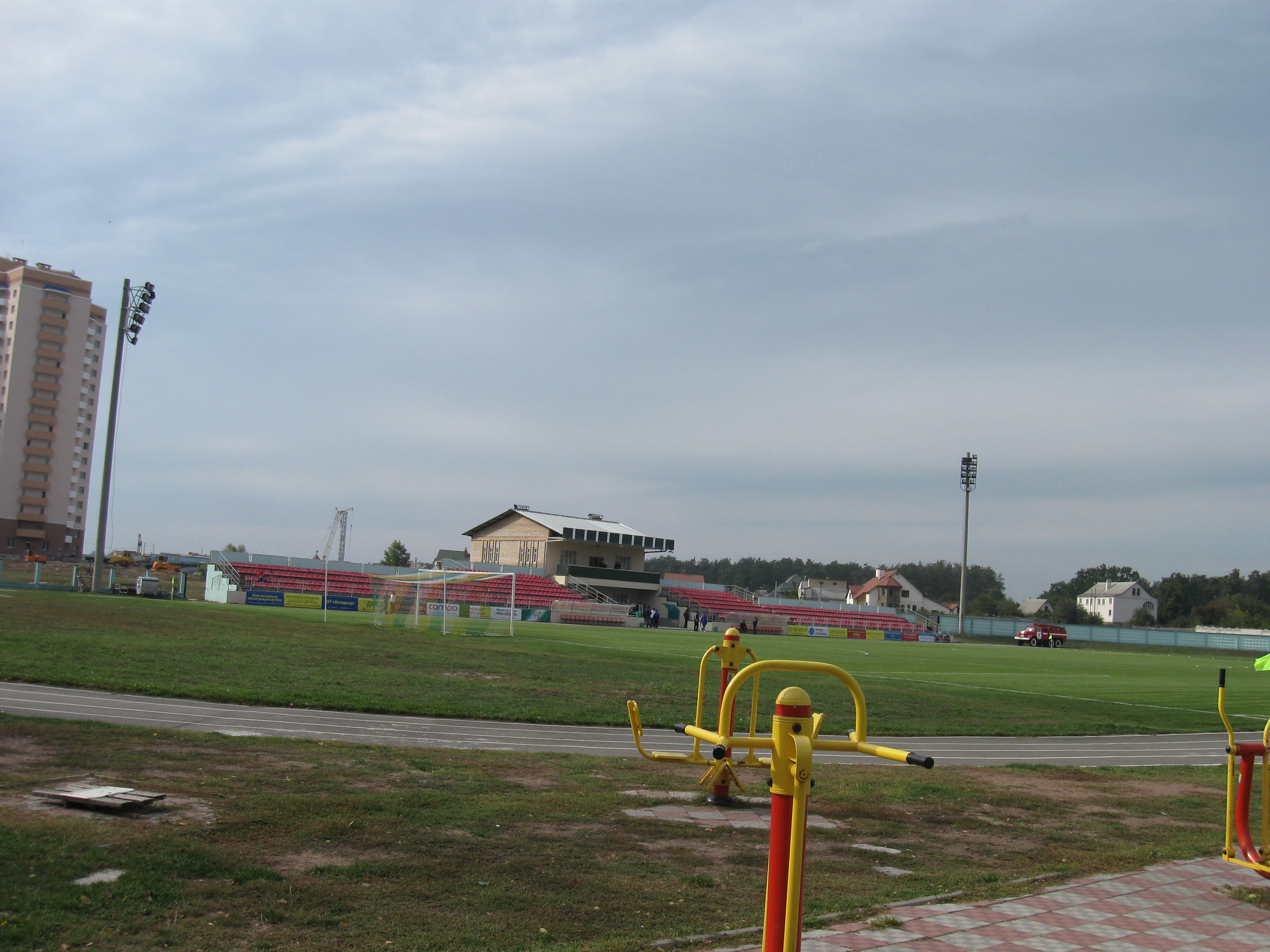
- Owner: Roman Solodarenko
- Chairman: Roman Solodarenko
- Manager: Vasyl Baranov
- Stadium: Kudrivka Arena; Stadium Yuvileinyi
- Ukrainian First League: 4th (promoted via play-off)
- Ukrainian Cup: Round of 32 (1/16)
- Top goalscorer: League: Lyehostayev (6); All: Storchous (7)
- Highest home attendance: 2100 (vs Epitsentr, 23 May 2025)
- Lowest home attendance: 0 (vs Ahrobiznes Volochysk, 17 May 2025)
- Biggest win: Kremin 0-3 Kudrivka
- Biggest defeat: Viktoriya Sumy 2-0 Kudrivka
Home colours	Away colours	Third colours

During the 2024–25 season, FC Kudrivka competed in the Ukrainian First League. During this season the club played mainly at Stadium Yuvileinyi for the Ukrainian First League's matches and in Kudrivka Arena.

== Season summary ==
On 19 October 2024, the club also used the Kudrivka Arena in the match against Viktoriya Sumy. In Ukrainian Cup, the team reached the Round of 64 (1/3), defeating Dinaz Vyshhorod and Livyi Bereh Kyiv. On 22 August the club lost against UCSA 0–4 in Stadium Yuvileinyi and was knocked out of the competition. In Ukrainian First League, the team did not start the championship very well, but recovered later with nine wins, four draws and 3 losses finishing first and entering the play-offs for promotion to the Ukrainian Premier League. In January 2025, Ihor Shukhovtsev was appointed as goalkeeper coach. The club's management reinforced the squad during the winter transfer window with some experienced players to help them face the pay-offs. In the Play-offs the team lost against Vorskla Poltava at the Stadium Yuvileinyi 2-1, while in the return match they won 1-0 in regular time and on penalties they won 3-4, qualifying for the Ukrainian Premier League for the first time in the club's history.

== Players ==
=== Squad information ===
As of 14 May 2023

Squad no.	Name	Nationality	Position	Date of birth (age)
Goalkeepers
1	Roman Lyopka	(Ukraine)	GK	21 February 1997 (aged 27)
12	Denys Zaychenko	(Ukraine)	GK	6 February 2004 (aged 20)
37	Anton Yashkov	(Ukraine)	GK	30 January 1992 (aged 33)
Defenders
17	Myroslav Serdyuk	(Ukraine)	DF	27 July 1999 (aged 24)
33	Artem Vasko	(Ukraine)	DF	18 November 2000 (aged 23)
35	Mykyta Teplyakov	(Ukraine)	DF	7 June 2000 (aged 24)
39	Artem Machelyuk	(Ukraine)	DF	14 October 1999 (aged 24)
69	Yuriy Potimkov	(Ukraine)	DF	1 August 2002 (aged 21)
87	Illya Cherednychenko	(Ukraine)	DF	12 June 1995 (aged 29)
90	Ivan Mamrosenko	(Ukraine)	DF	27 March 2000 (aged 24)
99	Roman Hahun	(Ukraine)	DF	6 June 1992 (aged 32)
Midfielders
6	Mykola Vechurko	(Ukraine)	DF	1 October 1998 (aged 25)
8	Andriy Storchous	(Ukraine)	DF	30 June 1994 (aged 30)
9	Vladyslav Nekhtiy	(Ukraine)	DF	19 December 1991 (aged 32)
14	Kyrylo Matvyeyev	(Ukraine)	DF	5 April 2002 (aged 22)
19	Artur Dumanyuk	(Ukraine)	DF	15 November 1996 (aged 27)
27	Yaroslav Kvasov	(Ukraine)	DF	5 April 1992 (aged 32)
29	Danylo Volynets	(Ukraine)	DF	4 March 2002 (aged 22)
30	Danylo Tuzenko	(Ukraine)	DF	4 December 2003 (aged 20)
78	Valeriy Rohozynskyi	(Ukraine)	DF	3 September 1995 (aged 28)
Forwards
7	Dmytro Korkishko	(Ukraine)	FW	4 March 1995 (aged 29)
10	Oleksiy Lytovchenko	(Ukraine)	FW	15 August 1996 (aged 27)
11	Roman Solodarenko	(Ukraine)	FW	26 January 1984 (aged 40)
20	Denys Svityukha	(Ukraine)	FW	8 February 2002 (aged 22)
23	Maksym Andrushchenko	(Ukraine)	FW	5 April 1999 (aged 25)
77	Artem Lyehostayev	(Ukraine)	FW	11 August 2002 (aged 21)
88	Oleksandr Yevtushenko	(Ukraine)	FW	6 March 2003 (aged 21)
98	Illya Zubkov	(Ukraine)	FW	21 April 1998 (aged 26)

== Management team ==
Position	Name	Year appointed	Last club/team
Manager	(Ukraine) Vasyl Baranov	2024-	Vorskla Poltava
Goalkeeping Coach	(Ukraine) Ihor Shukhovtsev	2025-	Mariupol
Goalkeeping Coach	(Ukraine) Yuriy Ovcharov	2022-2025	Desna Chernihiv

== Transfers ==
=== In ===
Date	Pos.	Player	Age	Moving from	Type	Fee	Source
Summer
28 June 2024	MF	(Ukraine) Myroslav Serdyuk	24	(Ukraine) Nyva Buzova	Transfer	Free	
29 June 2024	MF	(Ukraine) Andriy Storchous	28	(Ukraine) Druzhba Myrivka	Transfer	Free	
16 July 2024	FW	(Ukraine) Maksym Andrushchenko	25	(Ukraine) Zvyahel	Transfer	Free	
19 July 2024	FW	(Ukraine) Yaroslav Kvasov	32	(Ukraine) Inhulets Petrove	Transfer	Free	
21 July 2024	MF	(Ukraine) Artur Dumanyuk	28	(Ukraine) UCSA Tarasivka	Transfer	Free	
1 August 2024	FW	(Ukraine) Danylo Volynets	22	(Ukraine) Zvyahel	Transfer	Free	
1 August 2024	GK	(Ukraine) Anton Yashkov	33	(Ukraine) Zvyahel	Transfer	Free	
2 August 2024	MF	(Ukraine) Danylo Tuzenko	21	(Ukraine) Horishni Plavni	Transfer	Free	
7 August 2024	MF	(Ukraine) Yuriy Potimkov	22	(Ukraine) Metalist 1925	Loan	Free	
August 2024	MF	(Ukraine) Kyrylo Matvyeyev	23	(Ukraine) Karpaty Lviv	Loan	Free	
6 September 2024	MF	(Ukraine) Oleksiy Lytovchenko	28	(Ukraine) Livyi Bereh Kyiv	Transfer	Free	
Winter
24 January 2025	MF	(Ukraine) Ivan Melnychenko	23	(Ukraine) Mariupol	Transfer	Free	
7 February 2025	MF	(Ukraine) Kyrylo Matvyeyev	23	(Ukraine) Karpaty Lviv	Transfer	Free	
10 February 2025	FW	(Ukraine) Denys Svityukha	23	(Ukraine) Veres Rivne	Transfer	Free	
16 February 2025	MF	(Ukraine) Mykhaylo Shershen	29	(Ukraine) Inhulets Petrove	Transfer	Free	
6 March 2025	MF	(Ukraine) Maksym Melnychuk	25	(Ukraine) Inhulets Petrove	Transfer	Free	
6 March 2025	MF	(Ukraine) Oleksandr Kozak	30	(Ukraine) Inhulets Petrove	Transfer	Free	
27 March 2025	MF	(Ukraine) Illya Zubkov	27	(Ukraine) FSC Mariupol	Transfer	Free	

=== Out ===
Date	Pos.	Player	Age	Moving from	Type	Fee	Source
Summer
17 July 2025	MF	(Ukraine) Yevhen Chepurnenko	30	(Ukraine) Dinaz Vyshhorod	Transfer	Free	
24 July 2025	MF	(Ukraine) Volodymyr Tymenko	27	(Ukraine) Poltava	Transfer	Free	
24 July 2025	MF	(Ukraine) Yevgen Misyura	27	(Ukraine) Poltava	Transfer	Free	
1 August 2024	MF	(Ukraine) Oleksandr Mihunov	35	(Ukraine) Standart Novi Sanzhary	Transfer	Free	
2 August 2024	MF	(Ukraine) Dmytro Kulyk	24	(Ukraine) Dinaz Vyshhorod	Transfer	Free	
8 August 2024	MF	(Ukraine) Denys Tkachenko	27	(Ukraine) Sokil Mykhailivka-Rubezhivka	Transfer	Free	
8 August 2024	FW	(Ukraine) Nazar Voloshyn	23	(Ukraine) Lisne	Transfer	Free	
8 August 2024	MF	(Ukraine) Oleksandr Kalinin	22	(Ukraine) Lisne	Transfer	Free	
13 August 2024	MF	(Ukraine) Vladyslav Zorenko	23	(Ukraine) Rebel Kyiv	Transfer	Free	
16 August 2024	MF	(Ukraine) Pavlo Zakhidnyi	21	(Ukraine) Lokomotyv Kyiv	Transfer	Free	
6 August 2024	GK	(Ukraine) Georgiy Klimov	24	(Ukraine) Viktoriya Sumy	Transfer	Free	
Winter
31 January 2025	DF	(Ukraine) Illya Cherednychenko	29	Unattached	End Contract	Free	
31 January 2025	MF	(Ukraine) Vladyslav Nekhtiy	33	(Ukraine) Metalurh Zaporizhzhia	End Contract	Free	
31 January 2025	MF	(Ukraine) Danylo Volynets	33	(Ukraine) Oleksandriya-2	Transfer	Free	
8 February 2025	FW	(Ukraine) Yaroslav Kvasov	33	(Ukraine) Podillia Khmelnytskyi	End Contract	Free	
26 February 2025	DF	(Ukraine) Artem Vasko	24	Unattached	End Contract	Free	

== Competitions ==
=== Overall record ===
Competition	First match	Last match	Starting round	Record							
Competition	First match	Last match	Starting round	Pld	W	D	L	GF	GA	GD	Win %
First League	8 August 2024		Matchday 1	22	11	6	5	28	14	+14	50.00
Ukrainian Cup	3 August 2024	13 August 2024		3	2	0	1	5	7	−2	66.67
Total				25	13	6	6	33	21	+12	52.00

Last updated: December 2024
Source: Results

== Pre-season and friendlies ==
Win Draw Loss

27 July 2024 Friendly	Kudrivka (Ukraine)	2–3	(Ukraine) Kolos-2 Kovalivka
EET (UTC+02:00)		Report

28 September 2024 Friendly	Kudrivka (Ukraine)	1–3	(Ukraine) Dinaz Vyshhorod
EET (UTC+02:00)		Report

8 February 2025 Friendly	Kudrivka (Ukraine)	2–1	(Ukraine) Denhoff Denykhivka	Kyiv
EET (UTC+02:00)		Report

8 February 2025 Friendly	Kudrivka (Ukraine)	6–1	(Ukraine) Rebel FC	Kyiv
EET (UTC+02:00)		Report

13 February 2025 Friendly	Kudrivka (Ukraine)	1–1	(Ukraine) Inhulets Petrove
EET (UTC+02:00)

14 February 2025 Friendly	Lokomotyv Kyiv (Ukraine)	0–0	(Ukraine) Kudrivka
EET (UTC+02:00)

22 February 2025 Friendly	Kudrivka (Ukraine)	5–0	(Ukraine) Viktoriya Sumy	Buzova
EET (UTC+02:00)		Report		Stadium: Buzova Arena

27 February 2025 Friendly	Kudrivka (Ukraine)	1–1	(Ukraine) UCSA Tarasivka	Buzova
EET (UTC+02:00)		Report		Stadium: Buzova Arena

8 March 2025 Friendly	Kudrivka (Ukraine)	1–0	(Ukraine) Polissya Stavky	Buzova
EET (UTC+02:00)	Lytovchenko 16'	Report		Stadium: Buzova Arena

12 March 2025 Friendly	Kudrivka (Ukraine)	1–1	(Ukraine) Nyva Vinnytsia	Buzova
EET (UTC+02:00)	Storchous 17'	Report	Yevtikhov 64'	Stadium: Buzova Arena

18 March 2025 Friendly	Zorya Luhansk (Ukraine)	0–1	(Ukraine) Kudrivka
EET (UTC+02:00)		Report	Shershen 66'

21 March 2025 Friendly	Kudrivka (Ukraine)	1–0	(Ukraine) Chernihiv	Buzova
EET (UTC+02:00)	Potimkov 13'	Report		Stadium: Buzova Arena

29 March 2025 Friendly	Polissya-2 Zhytomyr (Ukraine)	1–3	(Ukraine) Kudrivka
EET (UTC+02:00)		Report	Teplyakov 28'; Melnychuk 76'; Matvyeyev 90'

=== Results by round ===
Round	1	2	3	4	5	6	7	8	9	10	11	12	13	14	15	16
Ground	H	H	A	H	A	H	A	H	A	A	A	H	A	A	H	A
Result	L	D	W	L	W	D	W	D	L	W	W	L	W	W	W	W
Position	9	8	5	5	3	4	3	4	2	2	2	2	1	1	1	1

Updated to match(es) played on November 2023. Source: Results
A = Away; H = Home; W = Win; D = Draw; L = Loss

=== Results by round Promotion group results ===
Round	1	2	3	4	5	6	7	8
Ground	A	H	A	H	H	A	H	A
Result	L	D	W	L	W	L	W	L
Position	4	6	2	4	3	4	3	4

Updated to match(es) played on April 2025. Source: Results
A = Away; H = Home; W = Win; D = Draw; L = Loss

=== Results ===
8 August 2024 1	Kudrivka	0–1	UCSA Tarasivka	Bucha
EEST (UTC+3)		Report		Stadium: Yuvileinyi

18 August 2024 2	Kudrivka	0–0	Dinaz Vyshhorod	Bucha
EEST (UTC+3)		Report		Stadium: Yuvileinyi

26 August 2024 3	Kudrivka	3–0	Metalurh Zaporizhzhia	Bucha
EEST (UTC+3)		Report		Stadium: Yuvileinyi

31 August 2024 4	Viktoriya Sumy	2–0	Kudrivka	Kyiv
EEST (UTC+3)		Report		Stadium: Bannikov Stadium

7 September 2024 5	Kudrivka	3–0	Kremin Kremenchuk	Bucha
EEST (UTC+3)		Report		Stadium: Yuvileinyi

11 September 2024 6	Kudrivka	0–0	Poltava	Bucha
EEST (UTC+3)		Report		Stadium: Yuvileinyi

16 September 2024 7	Mariupol	0–0	Kudrivka	Boryspil
EEST (UTC+3)		Report		Stadium: Kolos Stadium

21 September 2024 8	Kudrivka	1–1	Metalist 1925 Kharkiv	Kudrivka
EEST (UTC+3)		Report		Stadium: Kudrivka Arena

5 October 2024 9	UCSA Tarasivka	3–4	Kudrivka	Boryspil
EEST (UTC+3)		Report		Stadium: Kolos Stadium

10 October 2024 10	Dinaz Vyshhorod	0–1	Kudrivka	Demydiv
EEST (UTC+3)		Report		Stadium: Dinaz Stadium

14 October 2024 11	Metalurh Zaporizhzhia	1–3	Kudrivka	Zaporizhzhia
EEST (UTC+3)		Report		Stadium: Slavutych-Arena

19 October 2024 12	Kudrivka	0–2	Viktoriya Sumy	Kudrivka
EEST (UTC+3)		Report		Stadium: Kudrivka Arena

25 October 2024 13	Kremin Kremenchuk	0–3	Kudrivka	Horishni Plavni
EEST (UTC+3)		Report		Stadium: Yunist Stadium

2 November 2024 14	Poltava	1–2	Kudrivka	Horishni Plavni
EEST (UTC+3)		Report		Stadium: Yunist Stadium

10 November 2024 15	Kudrivka	1–0	Mariupol	Bucha
EEST (UTC+3)		Report		Stadium: Yuvileinyi

17 November 2024 16	Poltava	0–2	Kudrivka	Kyiv Oblast
EEST (UTC+3)		Report		Stadium: Arena Livyi Bereh

=== Promotion group results ===
6 April 2025 1	Bukovyna Chernivtsi	1-0	Kudrivka	Chernivtsi
EEST (UTC+3)	Koltsov	Report		Stadium: Bukovyna Stadium; Referee: Nikita Bogatyr

12 April 2025 2	Kudrivka	1-1	Metalist Kharkiv	Bucha
EEST (UTC+3)	Dumanyuk 15'	Report	Isayenko 44'	Stadium: Stadium Yuvileinyi

19 April 2025 3	Ahrobiznes Volochysk	0-2	Kudrivka	Volochysk
EEST (UTC+3)		Report	Rohozynskyi 45+2'; Teplyakov 90+2'	Stadium: Yunist Stadium

27 April 2025 4	Kudrivka	0-1	Epitsentr	Bucha
EEST (UTC+3)		Report	Kravchuk 84'	Stadium: Stadium Yuvileinyi

3 May 2025 5	Kudrivka	2-0	Bukovyna Chernivtsi	Kudrivka
EEST (UTC+3)	Lyehostayev 5'; Andrushchenko 16'	Report		Stadium: Kudrivka Arena

11 May 2025 6	Metalist Kharkiv	2-0	Kudrivka	Uzhhorod
EEST (UTC+3)	Horyainov 36'; Dihtyar 48'	Report		Stadium: Avanhard Stadium

17 May 2025 7	Kudrivka	2-0	Ahrobiznes Volochysk	Kudrivka
EEST (UTC+3)	Rohozynskyi 16'; Lyehostayev 26'			Stadium: Kudrivka Arena; Referee: Stepan Lapko

23 May 2025 8	Epitsentr	2-1	Kudrivka	Kamianets-Podilskyi
EEST (UTC+3)	Demchenko 17'; Demydenko 79'	Report	Lyehostayev 33'	Stadium: Tonkocheyev Stadium; Attendance: 2100; Referee: Andriy Zaytsev

=== Promotion play-offs ===
29 May 2025	Kudrivka	1-2	Vorskla Poltava	Kyiv
EEST (UTC+3)	Kozak 83'	Report	Nesterenko 23'; Pavlyuk 39'	Stadium: Obolon Arena; Referee: Dmytro Panchyshyn (Kharkiv)

1 June 2025	Vorskla Poltava	0-1 (a.e.t.) (3–4 p)	Kudrivka	Vorskla
EEST (UTC+3)		Report	Lytovchenko 9'	Stadium: Oleksiy Butovsky Vorskla Stadium
	Penalties
	Ndukve (penalty scored); Malysh (penalty scored); Iyede (penalty missed); Kane (penalty missed); Salabay (penalty scored); Sklyar (penalty missed)		(penalty scored) Tuzenko; (penalty missed) Storchous; (penalty scored) Shershen; (penalty scored) Potimkov; (penalty missed) Serdyuk; (penalty scored) Lyehostayev

=== Ukrainian Cup ===
3 August 2024 Round of 64 (1/32)	Dinaz Vyshhorod	1-2	Kudrivka	Bucha
EEST (UTC+3)	Seytkhalilov 41' Yarmak (yellow card) 52' (yellow-red card) 63'	Report	Storchous 11' Rohozynskyi 90'	Stadium: Stadium Yuvileinyi

11 August 2024 Round of 64 (1/32)	Kudrivka	3-2	Livyi Bereh Kyiv	Bucha
EEST (UTC+3)	Potimkov 37' Korkishko 77' Storchous 86'	Report	Lytovchenko 60', 76'	Stadium: Stadium Yuvileinyi

14 August 2024 Round of 64 (1/32)	Kudrivka	0-4	UCSA Tarasivka	Bucha
EEST (UTC+3)		Report	Goulart 29' Fogo 58', 63' Debelko 74'	Stadium: Stadium Yuvileinyi

== Statistics ==
=== Appearances and goals ===
No.	Pos	Nat	Player	Total		Ukrainian Second League		Cup		Play-offs	
No.	Pos	Nat	Player	Apps	Goals	Apps	Goals	Apps	Goals	Apps	Goals
Goalkeepers
1	GK	(Ukraine) UKR	Roman Lyopka	3	0	3	0	0	0	0	0
12	GK	(Ukraine) UKR	Denys Zaychenko	0	0	0	0	0	0	0	0
37	GK	(Ukraine) UKR	Anton Yashkov	24	0	21	0	1	0	2	0
Defenders
17	DF	(Ukraine) UKR	Myroslav Serdyuk	23	0	18	0	3	0	2	0
27	DF	(Ukraine) UKR	Mykhaylo Shershen	7	0	6	0	0	0	1	0
35	DF	(Ukraine) UKR	Mykyta Teplyakov	21	2	19	2	2	0	0	0
39	DF	(Ukraine) UKR	Artem Machelyuk	17	0	13	0	2	0	2	0
69	DF	(Ukraine) UKR	Yuriy Potimkov	20	2	16	1	2	1	2	0
90	DF	(Ukraine) UKR	Ivan Mamrosenko	16	1	14	1	2	0	0	0
91	DF	(Ukraine) UKR	Maksym Melnychuk	7	0	5	0	0	0	2	0
99	DF	(Ukraine) UKR	Roman Hahun	16	0	13	0	2	0	1	0
Midfielders
6	MF	(Ukraine) UKR	Mykola Vechurko	25	0	20	0	3	0	2	0
8	MF	(Ukraine) UKR	Andriy Storchous	25	7	20	5	3	2	2	0
14	MF	(Ukraine) UKR	Kyrylo Matvyeyev	26	0	23	0	2	0	1	0
19	MF	(Ukraine) UKR	Artur Dumanyuk	25	1	21	1	2	0	2	0
30	MF	(Ukraine) UKR	Danylo Tuzenko	19	0	16	0	2	0	1	0
45	MF	(Ukraine) UKR	Ivan Melnychenko	3	0	3	0	0	0	0	0
78	MF	(Ukraine) UKR	Valeriy Rohozynskyi	24	4	19	3	3	1	2	0
Forwards
7	FW	(Ukraine) UKR	Dmytro Korkishko	14	4	12	3	2	1	0	0
9	FW	(Ukraine) UKR	Oleksandr Kozak	10	1	8	0	0	0	2	1
10	FW	(Ukraine) UKR	Oleksiy Lytovchenko	13	4	11	3	0	0	2	1
11	FW	(Ukraine) UKR	Roman Solodarenko	0	0	0	0	0	0	0	0
20	FW	(Ukraine) UKR	Denys Svityukha	10	0	8	0	0	0	2	0
23	FW	(Ukraine) UKR	Maksym Andrushchenko	22	0	17	0	3	0	2	0
77	FW	(Ukraine) UKR	Artem Lyehostayev	29	6	24	6	3	0	2	0
88	FW	(Ukraine) UKR	Oleksandr Yevtushenko	20	2	17	2	3	0	0	0
98	FW	(Ukraine) UKR	Illya Zubkov	0	0	0	0	0	0	0	0
Players transferred out during the season
9	MF	(Ukraine) UKR	Vladyslav Nekhtiy	12	0	12	0	0	0	0	0
27	MF	(Ukraine) UKR	Yaroslav Kvasov	14	2	11	2	3	0	0	0
29	MF	(Ukraine) UKR	Danylo Volynets	2	0	1	0	1	0	0	0
33	DF	(Ukraine) UKR	Artem Vasko	2	0	2	0	0	0	0	0
87	DF	(Ukraine) UKR	Illya Cherednychenko	13	0	11	0	2	0	0	0

Source: Competitions

Last updated: 1 June 2025

=== Goalscorers ===
Rank	No.	Pos	Nat	Name	Premier League	Cup	Play-offs	Total
1	77	FW	(Ukraine)	Artem Lyehostayev	6	0	0	6
2	8	MF	(Ukraine)	Andriy Storchous	5	2	0	7
3	7	FW	(Ukraine)	Dmytro Korkishko	3	1	0	4
4	10	FW	(Ukraine)	Oleksiy Lytovchenko	3	0	1	4
5	78	DF	(Ukraine)	Valeriy Rohozynskyi	3	0	0	3
6	27	FW	(Ukraine)	Yaroslav Kvasov	2	0	0	2
7	35	DF	(Ukraine)	Mykyta Teplyakov	2	0	0	2
8	88	FW	(Ukraine)	Oleksandr Yevtushenko	1	0	0	1
9	69	DF	(Ukraine)	Yuriy Potimkov	1	1	0	2
10	90	DF	(Ukraine)	Ivan Mamrosenko	1	0	0	1
11	19	DF	(Ukraine)	Artur Dumanyuk	1	0	0	1
12	23	FW	(Ukraine)	Maksym Andrushchenko	1	0	0	1
13	9	MF	(Ukraine)	Oleksandr Kozak	0	0	1	1
				Total	29	5	2	36

Last updated: 1 June 2025

=== Clean sheets ===
Rank	No.	Pos	Nat	Name	Premier League	Cup	Play-offs	Total
1	37	GK	(Ukraine)	Anton Yashkov	8	0	1	9
2	1	GK	(Ukraine)	Roman Lyopka	1	0	0	1
				Total	9	0	1	10

Last updated: 1 June 2025
