= List of Ukrainian football transfers summer 2026 =

Ukrainian football transfers summer 2026

This is a list of Ukrainian football transfers in the summer transfer window of 2026 by club. Only transfers of the Premier League, 1st League and 2nd League are included.

== Ukrainian Premier League ==
=== Bukovyna Chernivtsi ===
In:

No.	Pos.	Nation	Player
—	MF	UKR	Maksym Zaderaka (Free Agent)
—	MF	CRO	Michael Klepac (from (Croatia) Široki Brijeg)

Out:

No.	Pos.	Nation	Player
—	DF	UKR	Kyrylo Prokopchuk (End of Contract)
—	DF	UKR	Vasyl Hakman (End of Contract)
—	MF	UKR	Yan Morhovskyi (End of Contract)
—	MF	UKR	Vitaliy Koltsov (End of Contract)
—	MF	UKR	Rodion Plaksa (End of Contract)
—	FW	UKR	Danylo Honcharuk (End of Contract)

=== Chornomorets Odesa ===
In:

No.	Pos.	Nation	Player
—	GK	UKR	Nazar Bayda (From Metalurh Zaporizhzhia)
—	DF	UKR	Serhiy Korniychuk (from Polissya Zhytomyr)
—	FW	UKR	Yevheniy Ryazantsev (Loan return from Podillya Khmelnytskyi)
—	FW	UKR	Danyil Alefirenko (from Kolos Kovalivka)

Out:

No.	Pos.	Nation	Player
—	DF	UKR	Vitaliy Yermakov (end of contract)
—	DF	UKR	Oleksandr Kapliyenko (end of contract)
—	MF	UKR	Oleksandr Sklyar (end of contract)
—	MF	UKR	Yuriy Romanyuk (end of contract)
—	MF	UKR	Artem Habelok (end of contract)
—	FW	UKR	Vladyslav Kulach (end of contract)
—	FW	UKR	Maksym Lunyov (end of contract)
—	FW	UKR	Oleksiy Khoblenko (end of contract)

=== Dynamo Kyiv ===
In:

No.	Pos.	Nation	Player
—	GK	UKR	Illya Olkhovyi (from Nyva Ternopil)
—	DF	UKR	Oleksandr Yatsyk (To FC Kharkiv)
—	MF	UKR	Oleksiy Husyev (Loan return from Kudrivka)
—	MF	UKR	Navin Malysh (Loan return from Zorya Luhansk)
—	MF	UKR	Roman Salenko (Loan return from Zorya Luhansk)
—	MF	UKR	Navin Malysh (Loan return from Zorya Luhansk)
—	MF	UKR	Valentyn Rubchynskyi (Loan return from Karpaty Lviv)
—	MF	POL	Tomasz Kędziora (from (Greece) PAOK)
—	FW	UKR	Andriy Matkevych (Loan return from Epitsentr)
—	FW	UKR	Vladyslav Supryaha (Loan return from Epitsentr)
—	FW	FRA	Pierre Mounguengue (from (France) Paris Saint-Germain)

Out:

No.	Pos.	Nation	Player
—	GK	UKR	Denys Ihnatenko (End of Contract)
—	GK	UKR	Valentyn Morhun (to Kolos Kovalivka)
—	DF	UKR	Oleksandr Karavayev (to Shakhtar Donetsk)
—	MF	UKR	Maksym Braharu (To Polissya Zhytomyr)

=== Epitsentr Kamianets-Podilskyi ===
In:

No.	Pos.	Nation	Player
—	DF	UKR	Andriy Boyko (from Kolos-2 Kovalivka)
—	MF	ALB	Serjan Repaj (from (Albania) Vora)
—	MF	UKR	Artem Kozak (from Oleksandriya)
—	MF	ESP	Raúl Tavares (Free Agent)
—	MF	ESP	Nene (From (Bulgaria) Beroe)

Out:

No.	Pos.	Nation	Player
—	DF	ESP	Alagy Oliveira (End of Contract)
—	MF	UKR	Yehor Demchenko (End of Contract)
—	MF	UKR	Volodymyr Tanchyk (End of Contract)
—	FW	UKR	Andriy Matkevych (Loan return to Dynamo Kyiv)
—	FW	UKR	Vladyslav Supryaha (Loan return to Dynamo Kyiv)
—	FW	UKR	Andriy Boryachuk (End iof Contract)

=== Karpaty Lviv ===
In:

No.	Pos.	Nation	Player
—	MF	UKR	Roman Vantukh (from Zorya Luhansk)
—	MF	UKR	Nazariy Rusyn (from (England) Sunderland)

Out:

No.	Pos.	Nation	Player
—	GK	UKR	Denys Marchenko (to (Germany) Borussia Mönchengladbach)
—	GK	UKR	Oleksandr Kemkin (to Kryvbas Kryvyi Rih)
—	GK	UKR	Andriy Klishchuk (End of Contract)
—	GK	UKR	Nazar Domchak (to (Czech Republic) Slavia Prague)
—	DF	UKR	Volodymyr Adamyuk (End of Contract)
—	MF	UKR	Valentyn Rubchynskyi (Loan return to Dynamo Kyiv)
—	MF	BRA	Edson Fernando (Loan to (Brazil) Clube do Remo)
—	MF	BRA	Bruninho (to (Israel) Maccabi Haifa)
—	FW	GAM	Baboucarr Faal (to (Czech Republic) Viktoria Plzeň)
—	FW	BRA	Igor Neves (End of Contract)
—	FW	BRA	Paulo Vitor (Loan return to (Brazil) Portimonense)
—	FW	BRA	Stênio (to (Italy) Modena)

=== Kharkiv ===
In:

No.	Pos.	Nation	Player
—	GK	UKR	Denys Marchenko (from Obolon Kyiv)
—	DF	UKR	Oleksandr Yatsyk (from Dynamo Kyiv)
—	MF	UKR	Denys Nahnoynyi (loan return from Kudrivka)
—	FW	VEN	Carlos Paraco (from Kryvbas Kryvyi Rih)
—	FW	GHA	Raymond Owusu (loan return from Kudrivka)

Out:

No.	Pos.	Nation	Player
—	GK	UKR	Vladyslav Rybak (end of contract)
—	GK	UKR	Oleh Mozil (end of contract)
—	DF	UKR	Volodymyr Adamyuk (end of contract)
—	DF	UKR	Yevhen Pasich (end of contract)
—	DF	UKR	Vasyl Kravets (end of contract)
—	DF	UKR	Ihor Snurnitsyn (end of contract)
—	MF	UKR	Vladyslav Kalitvintsev (end of contract)
—	MF	UKR	Vyacheslav Churko (end of contract)
—	MF	UKR	Ivan Lytvynenko (to (Lithuania) Žalgiris)

=== Kolos Kovalivka ===
In:

No.	Pos.	Nation	Player
—	GK	UKR	Valentyn Morhun (from Dynamo Kyiv)
—	MF	ALB	Irdi Kasalla (from (Albania) Vora)

Out:

No.	Pos.	Nation	Player
—	DF	UKR	Valeriy Bondarenko (Reliesed)
—	MF	UKR	Taras Stepanenko (retired)

=== Kryvbas Kryvyi Rih ===
In:

No.	Pos.	Nation	Player
—	GK	UKR	Oleksandr Kemkin (from Karpaty Lviv)

Out:

No.	Pos.	Nation	Player
—	GK	UKR	Volodymyr Makhankov (End of Contract)
—	DF	CMR	Yvan Dibango (to (Austria) LASK)
—	DF	VEN	Carlos Rojas (loan return to (Venezuela) Deportivo La Guaira)
—	MF	UKR	Maksym Zaderaka (end of contract)
—	MF	ECU	Jhoel Maya (loan return to (Ecuador) El Nacional)
—	FW	VEN	Carlos Paraco (to Kharkiv)
—	FW	VEN	Gleiker Mendoza (to Shakhtar Donetsk)

=== Kudrivka ===
In:

No.	Pos.	Nation	Player
—	GK	UKR	Kyrylo Lavuta (from Vorskla Poltava)
—	GK	UKR	Oleksandr Chobitko (from Oleksandriya U19)
—	DF	UKR	Dmytro Semenov (from Obolon Kyiv)
—	DF	UKR	Mykola Oharkov (Loan from Shakhtar Donetsk)
—	DF	UKR	Vladyslav Shapoval (Loan return from Chernihiv)
—	MF	UKR	Anton Demchenko (Loan return from Podillya Khmelnytskyi)
—	MF	UKR	Ivan Melnychenko (Loan return from Lokomotyv Kyiv)
—	MF	UKR	Yevheniy Smyrnyi (Free Agent)
—	MF	UKR	Serhiy Sten (from Veres Rivne)
—	MF	UKR	Yevhen Pasich (from Kharkiv)
—	MF	UKR	Mykola Vechurko (from Chaika)
—	MF	UKR	Kostyantyn Bychek (from Obolon Kyiv)
—	MF	UKR	Rodion Plaksa (Free Agent)
—	MF	UKR	Demyan Yesin (from (Italy) Calvi)
—	MF	ARG	Matías Rosales (from (Argentina) Sarmiento)
—	MF	NGR	Isiak Sahid Abdulaziz (Free Agent)
—	FW	PAN	Reynaldiño Verley (Loan from (Panama) Alianza)
—	FW	UKR	Oleksandr Yushchenko (Loan from Shakhtar Donetsk)

Out:

No.	Pos.	Nation	Player
—	GK	UKR	Illya Karavashchenko (To Zorya Luhansk)
—	GK	UKR	Roman Lyopka (End of Contract)
—	DF	UKR	Maryan Faryna (Loan return to Shakhtar Donetsk)
—	MF	UKR	Oleksandr Kozak (To Oleksandriya)
—	MF	UKR	Andriy Storchous (To Oleksandriya)
—	MF	UKR	Valeriy Rohozynskyi (Loan to Chernihiv)
—	MF	UKR	Oleh Pushkaryov (Loan return to Shakhtar Donetsk)
—	MF	UKR	Anton Hlushchenko (Loan return to Shakhtar Donetsk)
—	MF	UKR	Oleksiy Husyev (Loan return to Dynamo Kyiv)
—	MF	UKR	Yaroslav Kysil (Loan return to LNZ Cherkasy)
—	MF	UKR	Denys Nahnoynyi (Loan return to Metalist 1925 Kharkiv)
—	MF	UKR	Ivan Melnychenko (To Kolos-2 Kovalivka)
—	MF	UKR	Yevheniy Morozko (End of Contract)
—	MF	UKR	Artem Machelyuk (To Zorya Luhansk)
—	MF	ECU	Jair Collahuazo (Loan to (Saudi Arabia) Taawoun)
—	FW	UKR	Artem Lyehostayev (End of Contract)
—	FW	GHA	Raymond Owusu (Loan return to Metalist 1925 Kharkiv)
—	FW	MKD	Alban Taipi (to (Montenegro) Otrant-Olympic)

=== LNZ Cherkasy ===
In:

No.	Pos.	Nation	Player
—	DF	UKR	Vitaliy Roman (From Rukh Lviv)
—	DF	UKR	Andriy Kitela (From Rukh Lviv)
—	MF	BRA	Talles (From Rukh Lviv)
—	MF	UKR	Yaroslav Kysil (Loan return from Kudrivka)
—	FW	ALB	Tedi Cara (from Oleksandriya)

Out:

No.	Pos.	Nation	Player
—	DF	UKR	Illya Putrya (End of Contract)
—	DF	KOS	Hajdin Salihu (End of Contract)
—	MF	UKR	Marko Podolyak (End of Contract)
—	MF	UKR	Vyacheslav Tankovskyi (End of Contract)

=== FC Livyi Bereh Kyiv ===
In:

No.	Pos.	Nation	Player
—	GK	UKR	Denys Ignatenko (Free Agent)
—	MF	UKR	Valeriy Bondarenko (Free Agent)

Out:

No.	Pos.	Nation	Player
—	GK	UKR	Maksym Mekhaniv (End of Contract)
—	MF	UKR	Ruslan Dedukh (End of Contract)
—	MF	UKR	Simon Haloian (Loan to Chernihiv)
—	MF	UKR	Oleksandr Kalinin (End of Contract)
—	MF	UKR	Andriy Chepurnyi (End of Contract)
—	FW	UKR	Yehor Hunichev (End of Contract)

=== Obolon Kyiv ===
In:

No.	Pos.	Nation	Player
—	DF	UKR	Vitaliy Yermakov (Free Agent)
—	DF	UKR	Dmytro Kapinus (Loan from Kharkiv)
—	MF	UKR	Dmytro Myshnyov (Free Agent)
—	MF	UKR	Yevheniy Morozko (Free Agent)

Out:

No.	Pos.	Nation	Player
—	GK	UKR	Denys Marchenko (To Karpaty Lviv)
—	DF	UKR	Maksym Tretyakov (End of Contract)
—	MF	UKR	Ruslan Chernenko (End of Contract)
—	FW	UKR	Kostyantyn Bychek (End of Contract)

=== Polissya Zhytomyr ===
In:

No.	Pos.	Nation	Player
—	MF	UKR	Maksym Braharu (from Dynamo Kyiv)
—	MF	CPV	Leandro Andrade (from (Azerbaijan) Qarabağ)

Out:

No.	Pos.	Nation	Player
—	DF	BRA	Lucas Taylor (end of contract)
—	MF	UKR	Bohdan Lyednyev (End of Contract)
—	MF	UKR	Sergiy Korniychuk (to Chornomorets Odesa)
—	MF	ISR	Tomer Yosefi (to (Israel) Beitar Jerusalem)
—	FW	VEN	Luifer Hernández (to (Mexico) Puebla)

=== Shakhtar Donetsk ===
In:

No.	Pos.	Nation	Player
—	DF	UKR	Oleksandr Karavayev (from Dynamo Kyiv)
—	DF	UKR	Maryan Faryna (Loan return from Kudrivka)
—	MF	UKR	Oleh Pushkaryov (Loan return from Kudrivka)
—	MF	UKR	Anton Hlushchenko (Loan return from Kudrivka)
—	FW	VEN	Gleiker Mendoza (from Kryvbas Kryvyi Rih)
—	FW	BRA	Ryan Roberto (from (Brazil) Flamengo)

Out:

No.	Pos.	Nation	Player
—	DF	UKR	Yukhym Konoplya (to (Germany) Borussia Mönchengladbach)
—	DF	UKR	Mykola Oharkov (Loan to Kudrivka)
—	MF	UKR	Heorhiy Sudakov (to (Portugal) Benfica)

=== Veres Rivne ===
In:

No.	Pos.	Nation	Player
—	FW	AUS	Nathanael Blair (free agent)

Out:

No.	Pos.	Nation	Player
—	DF	UKR	Serhiy Korniychuk (loan return to Polissya Zhytomyr)
—	MF	UKR	Roman Honcharenko (free agent)
—	MF	UKR	Serhiy Sten (to Kudrivka)
—	FW	UKR	Denys Ndukve (loan return to Vorskla Poltava)

=== Zorya Luhansk ===
In:

No.	Pos.	Nation	Player
—	GK	UKR	Illya Karavashchenko (From Kudrivka)
—	GK	UKR	Vladyslav Rybak (From Metalist Kharkiv)
—	DF	UKR	Vasyl Kravets (Free Agent)
—	MF	UKR	Artem Machelyuk (From Kudrivka)

Out:

No.	Pos.	Nation	Player
—	DF	NGR	Christopher Nwaeze (to (Moldova) Milsami Orhei)
—	MF	UKR	Navin Malysh (Loan return to Dynamo Kyiv)
—	MF	UKR	Roman Salenko (Loan return to Dynamo Kyiv)

== Ukrainian First League ==
=== Ahrobiznes Volochysk ===
In:

No.	Pos.	Nation	Player

Out:

No.	Pos.	Nation	Player
—	MF	UKR	Roman Tolochko (End of Contract)

=== FC Chernihiv ===
In:

No.	Pos.	Nation	Player
—	MF	UKR	Valeriy Rohozynskyi (Loan from Kudrivka)
—	MF	UKR	Davronbek Azizov (from Podillya Khmelnytskyi)
—	MF	UKR	Dmytro Plakhtyr (from Poltava)
—	MF	UKR	Simon Haloian (Loan from Livyi Bereh Kyiv)
—	MF	UKR	Dzhilindo Bezghubchenko (Free Agent)

Out:

No.	Pos.	Nation	Player
—	DF	UKR	Vladyslav Shapoval (Loan return to Kudrivka)
—	DF	UKR	Mykyta Teplyakov (Released)
—	MF	UKR	Vladyslav Chaban (Loan return to Inhulets Petrove)
—	MF	UKR	Dzhilindo Bezghubchenko (Released)
—	MF	UKR	Andriy Stolyarchuk (Released)
—	FW	UKR	Daniil Volskyi (Released)

=== Inhulets Petrove ===
In:

No.	Pos.	Nation	Player
—	MF	UKR	Vladyslav Chaban (Loan return from Chernihiv)

Out:

No.	Pos.	Nation	Player
—	GK	UKR	Anton Zhylkin (To Karpaty Lviv)

=== Kulykiv-Bilka ===
In:

No.	Pos.	Nation	Player

Out:

No.	Pos.	Nation	Player

=== Kolos-2 Kovalivka ===
In:

No.	Pos.	Nation	Player

Out:

No.	Pos.	Nation	Player

=== Lokomotyv Kyiv ===
In:

No.	Pos.	Nation	Player
—	GK	UKR	Roman Lyopka (From Kudrivka)

Out:

No.	Pos.	Nation	Player
—	MF	UKR	Ivan Melnychenko (Loan return to Kudrivka)

=== Feniks-Mariupol ===
In:

No.	Pos.	Nation	Player

Out:

No.	Pos.	Nation	Player
—	MF	UKR	Andriy Tkachuk (Retired)

=== Metalist Kharkiv ===
In:

No.	Pos.	Nation	Player

Out:

No.	Pos.	Nation	Player
—	GK	UKR	Vladyslav Rybak (to Zorya Luhansk)
—	DF	UKR	Vitaliy Fedoriv (End of Contract)

=== Nyva Ternopil ===
In:

No.	Pos.	Nation	Player

Out:

No.	Pos.	Nation	Player
—	GK	UKR	Illya Olkhovyi (to Dynamo Kyiv)

=== Oleksandriya ===
In:

No.	Pos.	Nation	Player
—	MF	UKR	Oleksandr Kozak (From Kudrivka)
—	MF	UKR	Andriy Storchous (From Kudrivka)
—	MF	UKR	Roman Tolochko (Free Agent)
—	MF	UKR	Roman Kuzmyn (Free Agent)
—	MF	UKR	Nazar Havrylyuk (from Probiy Horodenka)

Out:

No.	Pos.	Nation	Player
—	DF	POR	Miguel Campos (End of Contract)
—	MF	UKR	Dmytro Myshnyov (End of Contract)
—	MF	UKR	Artem Kozak (to Epitsentr)
—	MF	UKR	Yevheniy Smyrnyi (to Kudrivka)
—	FW	ALB	Tedi Cara (to LNZ Cherkasy)

=== Polissya-2 Zhytomyr ===
In:

No.	Pos.	Nation	Player

Out:

No.	Pos.	Nation	Player

=== Poltava ===
In:

No.	Pos.	Nation	Player

Out:

No.	Pos.	Nation	Player
—	GK	ARM	Valeriy Voskonyan (End of Contract)
—	DF	UKR	Yevhen Misyura (End of Contract)
—	MF	UKR	Maksym Marusych (End of Contract)
—	MF	UKR	Dmytro Plakhtyr (to Chernihiv)
—	MF	UKR	Arsentiy Doroshenko (to (Latvia) Ogre United)

=== Probiy Horodenka ===
In:

No.	Pos.	Nation	Player

Out:

No.	Pos.	Nation	Player
—	GK	UKR	Roman Serdyuk (Retired)
—	MF	UKR	Nazar Havrylyuk (to Oleksandriya)

=== Prykarpattia-Blaho ===
In:

No.	Pos.	Nation	Player

Out:

No.	Pos.	Nation	Player
—	MF	UKR	Nazar Prykhodko (End of Contract)

=== UCSA Tarasivka ===
In:

No.	Pos.	Nation	Player
—	FW	UKR	Oleksiy Khoblenko (Free Agent)

Out:

No.	Pos.	Nation	Player

=== Viktoriya Sumy ===
In:

No.	Pos.	Nation	Player
—	MF	UKR	Ruslan Dedukh (Free Agent)

Out:

No.	Pos.	Nation	Player
—	FW	UKR	Pavlo Fedosov (To Bratslav)

== Ukrainian Second League ==
=== Atlet Kyiv ===
In:

No.	Pos.	Nation	Player

Out:

No.	Pos.	Nation	Player

=== Avanhard Lozova ===
In:

No.	Pos.	Nation	Player

Out:

No.	Pos.	Nation	Player

=== Bratslav Vinnytsia ===
In:

No.	Pos.	Nation	Player
—	MF	UKR	Oleksiy Bandurin (From Metalurh Zaporizhzhia)
—	MF	UKR	Vladyslav Nekhtiy (From Metalurh Zaporizhzhia)
—	FW	UKR	Pavlo Fedosov (From Viktoriya Sumy)

Out:

No.	Pos.	Nation	Player
—	GK	UKR	Vitaliy Chebotaryov (Free Agent)
—	MF	UKR	Maksym Lopyryonok (To Probiy Horodenka)

=== Dinaz Vyshhorod ===
In:

No.	Pos.	Nation	Player

Out:

No.	Pos.	Nation	Player

=== Dnister Zalishchyky ===
In:

No.	Pos.	Nation	Player

Out:

No.	Pos.	Nation	Player

=== Metalurh Zaporizhzhia ===
In:

No.	Pos.	Nation	Player

Out:

No.	Pos.	Nation	Player
—	DF	UKR	Danylo Izotov (End of Contract)
—	MF	UKR	Andrii Savitskyi (End of Contract)
—	MF	UKR	Suleyman Seytkhalilov (End of Contract)
—	MF	UKR	Ivan Mamrosenko (End of Contract)

=== Nyva Vinnytsia ===
In:

No.	Pos.	Nation	Player

Out:

No.	Pos.	Nation	Player

=== Oleksandriya-2 ===
In:

No.	Pos.	Nation	Player

Out:

No.	Pos.	Nation	Player

=== Penuel Kryvyi Rih ===
In:

No.	Pos.	Nation	Player

Out:

No.	Pos.	Nation	Player

=== Podillya Khmelnytskyi ===
In:

No.	Pos.	Nation	Player
—	MF	UKR	Ruslan Chernenko (Free Agent)
—	MF	UKR	Vladyslav Chaban (Free Agent).

Out:

No.	Pos.	Nation	Player
—	MF	UKR	Oleksiy Bezruchuk (Loan return to Kolos Kovalivka)
—	MF	UKR	Vladyslav Shershen (Loan return to Kolos Kovalivka)
—	MF	UKR	Rostyslav Baran (Loan return to Veres Rivne)
—	FW	UKR	Yevheniy Ryazantsev (Loan return to Chornomorets Odesa)
—	FW	UKR	Anton Demchenko (Loan return to Kudrivka)

=== SC Poltava-2 ===
In:

No.	Pos.	Nation	Player

Out:

No.	Pos.	Nation	Player

=== Rukh Lviv ===
In:

No.	Pos.	Nation	Player

Out:

No.	Pos.	Nation	Player
—	DF	UKR	Denys Slyusar (End of Contract)
—	DF	UKR	Yuriy Kopyna (End of Contract)
—	DF	UKR	Mykola Kyrychok (End of Contract)
—	DF	UKR	Oleksiy Tovarnytskyi (End of Contract)
—	DF	UKR	Vitaliy Roman (To LNZ Cherkasy)
—	DF	UKR	Andriy Kitela (To LNZ Cherkasy)
—	MF	BRA	Talles (To LNZ Cherkasy)
—	MF	UKR	Maksym Boyko (End of Contract)
—	MF	UKR	Kostyantyn Kvas (End of Contract)
—	MF	MDA	Vlad Răileanu (End of Contract)
—	MF	UKR	Vasyl Runich (End of Contract)
—	MF	UKR	Ostap Prytula (End of Contract)
—	FW	UKR	Nazar Kasarda (End of Contract)
—	FW	KGZ	Beknaz Almazbekov (End of Contract)

=== Sambir-Nyva-2 Ternopil ===
In:

No.	Pos.	Nation	Player

Out:

No.	Pos.	Nation	Player

=== Skala 1911 Stryi ===
In:

No.	Pos.	Nation	Player

Out:

No.	Pos.	Nation	Player

=== Trostianets ===
In:

No.	Pos.	Nation	Player
—	MF	UKR	Artur Bobita (From Dinaz Vyshhorod)
—	MF	UKR	Andriy Bohdanov (From Feniks-Mariupol)

Out:

No.	Pos.	Nation	Player
—	MF	UKR	Timofiy Khussin (To Inhulets Petrove)

=== Vilkhivtsi ===
In:

No.	Pos.	Nation	Player

Out:

No.	Pos.	Nation	Player

== See also ==
- Football in Ukraine
- 2026–27 Ukrainian Cup
- 2026–27 Ukrainian Premier League
- 2026–27 Ukrainian First League
- 2026–27 Ukrainian Second League
- 2026–27 Ukrainian Football Amateur League
- 2026–27 Ukrainian Amateur Cup
- 2026–27 Ukrainian Premier League Under-19
- 2026–27 Ukrainian Women's Top League
- List of Ukrainian football transfers winter 2026–27
