= Illya Zubkov =

Ukrainian footballer

Personal information
- Full name: Illya Dmytrovych Zubkov
- Date of birth: 21 April 1998 (age 28)
- Place of birth: Kyiv, Ukraine
- Height: 1.86 m (6 ft 1 in)
- Position: Forward

Team information
- Current team: Lokomotyv Kyiv
- Number: 19

Youth career
- 200?–2005: Dobro Kyiv
- 2005–2007: Voskhod Kyiv
- 2007–2015: Dynamo Kyiv

Senior career*
Years	Team	Apps	(Gls)
2015–2017	Dynamo Kyiv	0	(0)
2015–2016	→ Dynamo-2 Kyiv	8	(0)
2017	Benešov	4	(2)
2017–2018	Sellier & Bellot Vlašim	0	(0)
2018–2019	Bohemians 1905 B	0	(0)
2019–2020	Kapfenberger SV	12	(1)
2020–2021	Alians Lypova Dolyna	26	(3)
2021–2023	Metalist 1925 Kharkiv	15	(1)
2023–2025	FSC Mariupol	30	(9)
2025	Kudrivka	0	(0)
2026–	Lokomotyv Kyiv	11	(2)

International career^{‡}
2014	Ukraine U17	3	(0)
2016	Ukraine U20	1	(0)
2016	Ukraine U21	1	(0)
- * Club domestic league appearances and goals as of 22 May 2026 ‡ National team caps and goals as of 21 May 2021

Illya Dmytrovych Zubkov (Ukrainian: Ілля Дмитрович Зубков; born 21 April 1998) is a Ukrainian professional footballer who plays as a striker for Lokomotyv Kyiv .

== Career ==
Born in Kyiv, Zubkov is a product of the local Dobro, Voskhod and Dynamo Kyiv youth sportive school systems.

After playing in the Czech Republic and Austria, he returned to Ukraine. In September 2021 Zubkov signed a contract with Metalist 1925 Kharkiv and made his debut for this club in the Ukrainian Premier League as a second half substitute in the losing home match against FC Dynamo Kyiv on 11 September 2021.

He was also called up to the different Ukrainian youth representations. Zubkov made his debut for Ukraine U-20 on March 22 in home friendly match against England "C" team which Ukraine lost 0:2. Coached by Oleksandr Holovko, Ukraine U-20 was hosting England "C" team at stadion imeni Bannikova and Zubko played the whole first half after which was substituted by Roman Yaremchuk.

On 2 March 2026, he signed for Lokomotyv Kyiv in Ukrainian Second League.

== Honours ==
Lokomotyv Kyiv

- Ukrainian Second League: 2025–26 (Group B)
