= Danylo Volynets =

Ukrainian footballer

Personal information
- Full name: Danylo Anatoliyovych Volynets
- Date of birth: 4 May 2002 (age 24)
- Place of birth: Zhytomyr, Ukraine
- Height: 1.81 m (5 ft 11 in)
- Position: Central midfielder

Youth career
- 2014–2018: Dnipro

Senior career*
Years	Team	Apps	(Gls)
2018	Dnipro	7	(0)
2019–2021	Dnipro-1	0	(0)
2021–2022	Podillya Khmelnytskyi	0	(0)
2022–2023	Polissya Zhytomyr	1	(0)
2023–2024	Zviahel	18	(4)
2024	Kudrivka	1	(0)
2025	Oleksandriya-2	6	(0)
2025	Probiy Horodenka	13	(0)

International career^{‡}
2017	Ukraine U17	4	(0)
- * Club domestic league appearances and goals as of 26 December 2025 ‡ National team caps and goals as of 22 December 2021

Danylo Anatoliyovych Volynets (Ukrainian: Данило Анатолійович Волинець; born 4 May 2002) is a Ukrainian professional footballer who plays as a central midfielder.

== Honours ==
Polissya Zhytomyr

- Ukrainian First League: 2022–23
