= Roman Salenko =

Ukrainian footballer

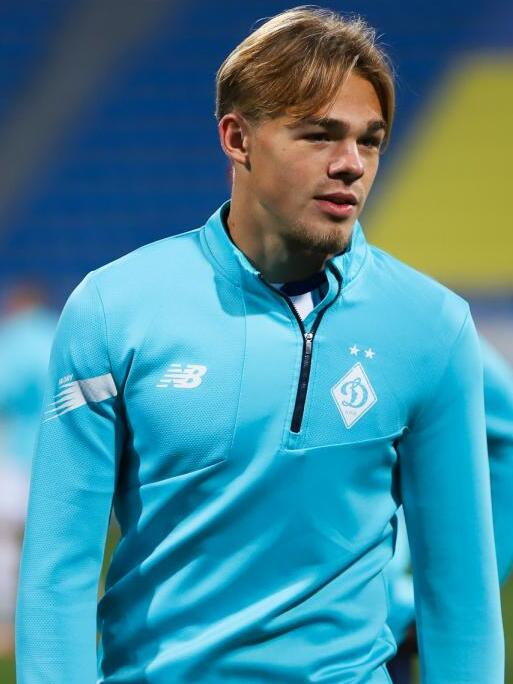
- Salenko in 2023

Personal information
- Full name: Roman Olehovych Salenko
- Date of birth: 18 May 2005 (age 21)
- Place of birth: Kyiv, Ukraine
- Height: 1.88 m (6 ft 2 in)
- Position: Attacking midfielder

Team information
- Current team: Zorya Luhansk (on loan from Dynamo Kyiv)
- Number: 19

Youth career
- 2016–2017: Dynamo Kyiv
- 2018: Dinaz Vyshhorod

Senior career*
Years	Team	Apps	(Gls)
2021–2022	Dinaz Vyshhorod	8	(0)
2022–	Dynamo Kyiv	2	(0)
2025–	→ Zorya Luhansk (loan)	16	(1)

International career^{‡}
2023	Ukraine U19	3	(0)
2025	Ukraine U20	3	(0)
2025–	Ukraine U21	3	(0)
- * Club domestic league appearances and goals as of 31 March 2026 ‡ National team caps and goals as of 9 November 2025

Roman Olehovych Salenko (Ukrainian: Роман Олегович Саленко; born 18 May 2005) is a Ukrainian professional footballer who plays as an attacking midfielder for Zorya Luhansk, on loan from Dynamo Kyiv.

== Club career ==
=== Early career ===
At the age of seven, his father took him to the Dynamo Kyiv junior squads and Academy. He also played for Dinaz Vyshhorod.

=== Dinaz Vyshhorod ===
In 2021, he signed his first professional contract with the Dinaz Vyshhorod senior team in Ukrainian Second League. On 18 August 2021, he made his debut in Ukrainian Cup against Obolon Kyiv at the Dinaz Stadium in Lyutizh.

=== Dynamo Kyiv ===
On 23 November 2024, he made his debut with his new club in Ukrainian Premier League against Chornomorets Odesa, replacing Vitaliy Buyalskyi. On 21 January 2025, he made his debut in UEFA Europa League against Galatasaray at the Rams Park for the 2024–25 UEFA Europa League league phase.

==== Loan to Zorya Luhansk ====
In July 2025 he was loaned to Zorya Luhansk in Ukrainian Premier League. On 2 August 2025, he made his debut with his new club against LNZ Cherkasy. On 11 August 2025, he scored his first goal against Kudrivka at the Valeriy Lobanovskyi Dynamo Stadium in Kyiv.

== International career ==
In November 2023 he was called up by the Ukraine under-19 team.

== Personal life ==
He is the son of the former international footballer Oleg Salenko.

== Honours ==
Dynamo Kyiv

- Ukrainian Premier League: 2024–25
- Ukrainian Cup: Runner-Up 2024–25

FC Dynamo Kyiv U-19

- Ukrainian Premier League Reserves: (2) 2018–19, 2019–20
