= Maksym Andrushchenko =

Ukrainian footballer

Personal information
- Full name: Maksym Ruslanovych Andrushchenko
- Date of birth: 5 April 1999 (age 27)
- Place of birth: Zhytomyr, Ukraine
- Height: 1.69 m (5 ft 7 in)
- Position: Midfielder

Team information
- Current team: Vorskla Poltava
- Number: 20

Youth career
- 2012–2013: Zirka Kyiv
- 2013–2016: Shakhtar Donetsk

Senior career*
Years	Team	Apps	(Gls)
2016–2019	Shakhtar Donetsk	0	(0)
2020	Smederevo	1	(0)
2020–2021	Spartak Subotica	0	(0)
2020	→ Dubočica (loan)	3	(0)
2021–2023	Polissya Zhytomyr	35	(2)
2023–2024	Zvyahel	19	(2)
2024–2025	Kudrivka	17	(1)
2025–26	Vorskla Poltava	25	(3)
2026-	FC UCSA Tarasivka	13	(1)
- * Club domestic league appearances and goals as of 4 June 2026

Maksym Ruslanovych Andrushchenko (Ukrainian: Максим Русланович Андрущенко; born 5 April 1999) is a Ukrainian professional footballer who plays as a midfielder for Ukrainian club Vorskla Poltava.

== Honours ==
Polissya Zhytomyr

- Ukrainian First League: 2022–23
