= Yaroslav Kvasov =

Ukrainian footballer

Personal information
- Full name: Yaroslav Ihorovych Kvasov
- Date of birth: 5 March 1992 (age 34)
- Place of birth: Sloviansk, Ukraine
- Height: 1.86 m (6 ft 1 in)
- Position: Striker

Team information
- Current team: Podillia Khmelnytskyi
- Number: 7

Youth career
- 2005–2010: Olimpik Donetsk
- 2011–2014: Zorya Luhansk

Senior career*
Years	Team	Apps	(Gls)
2014–2016	Zorya Luhansk	4	(0)
2014–2015	→ Sillamäe Kalev (loan)	66	(31)
2017	Dinamo Batumi	33	(8)
2018	Kolkheti Poti	11	(2)
2019–2020	Telavi	44	(10)
2021	Kryvbas Kryvyi Rih	11	(3)
2021	Volyn Lutsk	6	(0)
2023–2024	Inhulets Petrove	25	(4)
2024	Kudrivka	11	(1)
2025–	Podillia Khmelnytskyi	25	(1)
- * Club domestic league appearances and goals as of 4 June 2026

Yaroslav Ihorovych Kvasov (Ukrainian: Ярослав Ігорович Квасов; born 5 March 1992) is a Ukrainian professional footballer who plays as a striker for Podillia Khmelnytskyi.

== Career ==
Kvasov is a product of the FC Olimpik Donetsk School System. In 2011, he signed a contract with FC Zorya and then for two seasons played on loan for JK Sillamäe Kalev in the Meistriliiga.

He made his debut for FC Zorya in the match against FC Olimpik Donetsk on 6 March 2016 in the Ukrainian Premier League.
