= Mykhaylo Shershen =

Ukrainian footballer

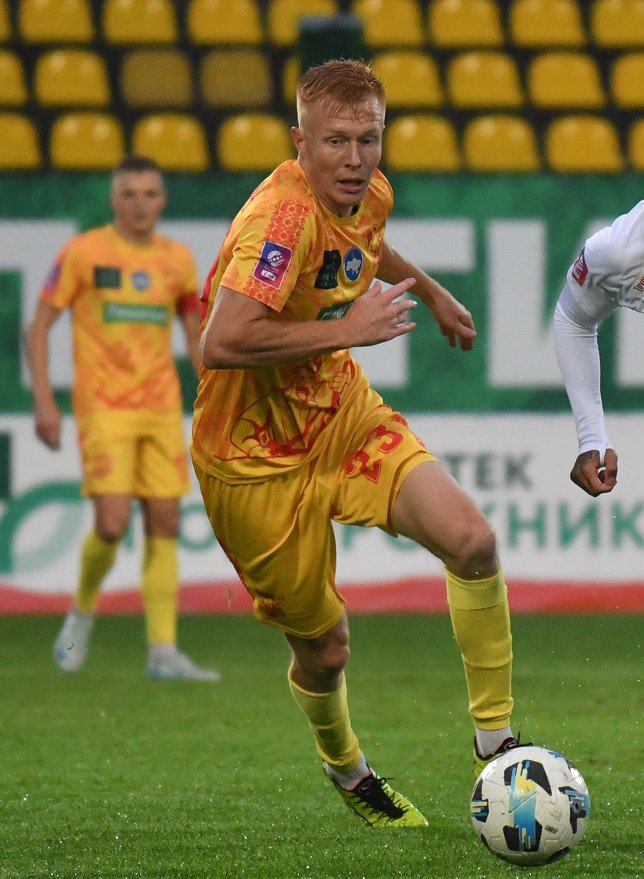

Personal information
- Full name: Mykhaylo Serhiyovych Shershen
- Date of birth: 27 April 1995 (age 31)
- Place of birth: Zmiiv, Ukraine
- Height: 1.87 m (6 ft 2 in)
- Position: Centre-back

Team information
- Current team: Vorskla Poltava
- Number: 23

Youth career
- –2008: HGVUFK Kharkiv
- 2009–2012: Obolon Kyiv
- 2012–2015: Zorya Luhansk

Senior career*
Years	Team	Apps	(Gls)
2015–2017	Zorya Luhansk	1	(0)
2015–2016	→ Kremin Kremenchuk (loan)	23	(1)
2017–2019	→ Avanhard Kramatorsk (loan)	57	(1)
2019–2023	Metalist 1925 Kharkiv	83	(4)
2023–2024	Inhulets Petrove	43	(3)
2025	Kudrivka	6	(0)
2025–26	Vorskla Poltava	23	(0)
2026-	FC UCSA Tarasivka	6	(1)
- * Club domestic league appearances and goals as of 3 June 2026

Mykhaylo Serhiyovych Shershen (Ukrainian: Михайло Сергійович Шершень; born 27 April 1995) is a Ukrainian professional footballer who plays as a defender for Vorskla Poltava.

== Career ==
In 2012 he signed contract with Ukrainian FC Zorya Luhansk and played in the Ukrainian Premier League Reserves until 2017, with the break, during 2015–2016, when Shershen went on loan in the Ukrainian Second League club FC Kremin Kremenchuk. After return from loan he was promoted in March 2017 to the main-squad team of FC Zorya in the Ukrainian Premier League.

He made his debut as a start-squad player for Zorya in the Ukrainian Premier League in a match against FC Shakhtar Donetsk on 6 May 2017.

In 2025 he moved to Kudrivka in Ukrainian First League.

== Honours ==
Inhulets Petrove

- Ukrainian First League: 2023–24
