= Roman Hahun =

Ukrainian footballer

Personal information
- Full name: Roman Valentynovych Hahun
- Date of birth: 16 July 1993 (age 33)
- Place of birth: Shepetivka, Khmelnytskyi Oblast, Ukraine
- Height: 1.71 m (5 ft 7 1/2 in)
- Position: Defender

Team information
- Current team: Feniks-Mariupol
- Number: 2

Youth career
- 2007–2010: Pansion Shepetivka
- 2010–2011: Olimpik Donetsk
- 2011–2012: Temp Shepetivka
- 2012–2013: Olimpik Donetsk

Senior career*
Years	Team	Apps	(Gls)
2013–2014	Hoverla Uzhhorod	0	(0)
2014–2017	Odishi 1919	79	(0)
2014–2015	→ Odishi 1919-2	2	(1)
2017–2020	Ahrobiznes Volochysk	82	(2)
2020–2021	Rukh Lviv	22	(0)
2022–2023	Veres Rivne	32	(0)
2024	Nyva Buzova	10	(0)
2024–2025	Kudrivka	13	(0)
2025–	Feniks-Mariupol	25	(0)
- * Club domestic league appearances and goals as of 4 June 2026

Roman Valentynovych Hahun (Ukrainian: Роман Валентинович Гагун; born 16 July 1993) is a Ukrainian professional footballer who plays as a defender for Feniks-Mariupol.

== Career ==
Hahun is a product of the FC Pansion youth sportive school in his native Shepetivka. In October 2020 he signed a contract with FC Rukh Lviv, that plays in the Ukrainian Premier League. In June 2022 he signed for Veres Rivne.

In 2024 he moved to Kudrivka helping the club to be promoted to Ukrainian Premier League. On 23 July 2025 he extended his contract with the club.

On 27 August 2025 he signed for Feniks-Mariupol in Ukrainian First League.

== Honours ==
Ahrobiznes Volochysk

- Ukrainian Second League: 2017–18
