= Stadion Yuvileinyi =

Ukrainian football stadium

- Стадіон Yubileyny
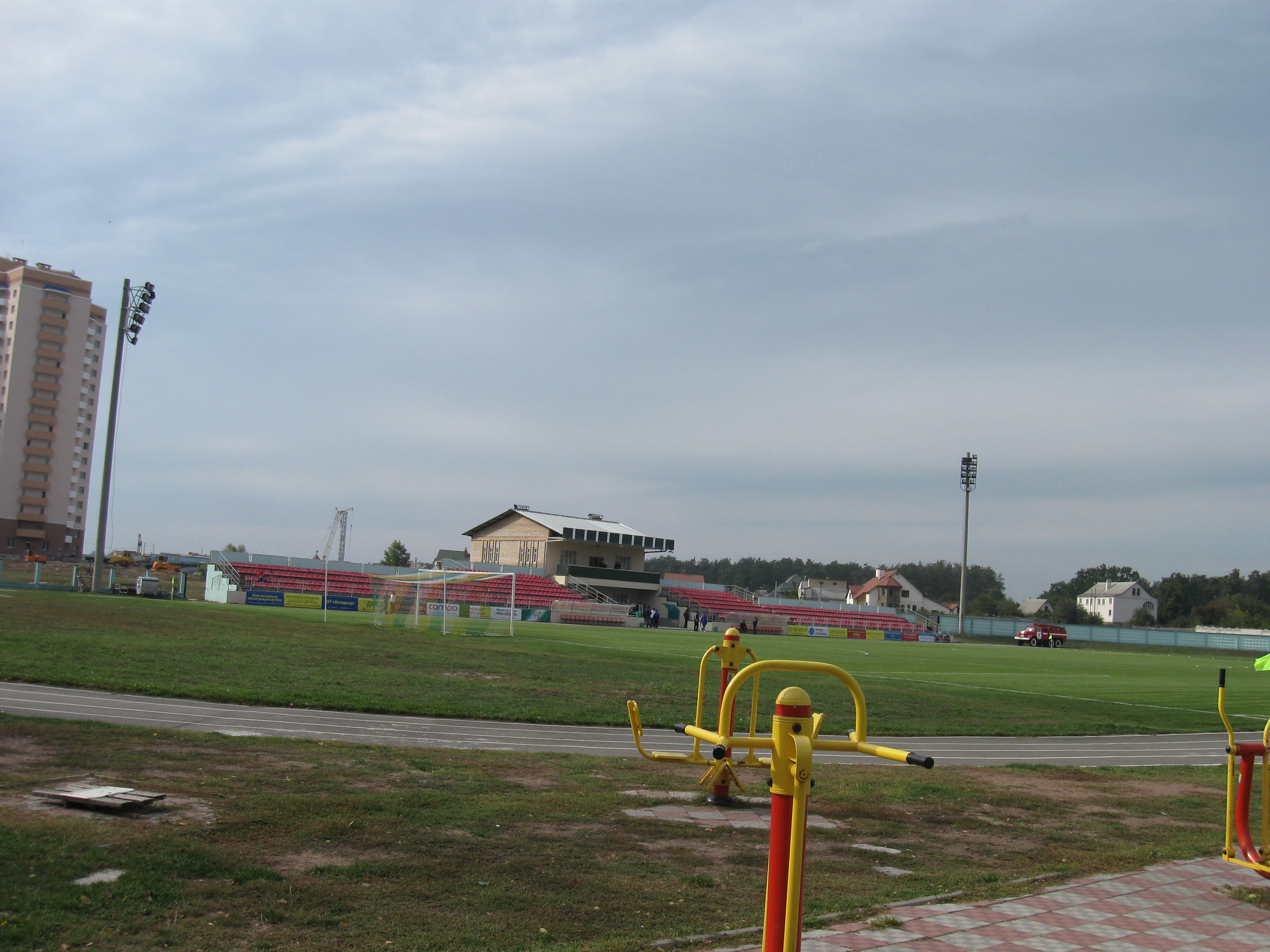
- Interactive map of Stadion Yuvileinyi
- Location: Yevhena Hrebinka Street, 2-V Bucha, Ukraine
- Coordinates: 50°33′14″N 30°12′39″E
- Owner: Ministry of Youth and Sports of Ukraine
- Capacity: 1028

Construction
- Opened: 2001

Tenants
- Kudrivka (until 2024); UCSA Tarasivka (from 2025); Polissya Zhytomyr (2020–2021); FC Bucha (from 2001); Obolon-2 (2020–2021)

Stadion Yuvileinyi (Ukrainian: Стадіон Yubileyny) is a football stadium in Bucha, Ukraine.

== History ==
=== Origin ===
The stadium was opened in 2001 on the occasion of the 100th anniversary of the city of Bucha. On its grounds there are sports simulators for outdoor sports. Residents of the city have the opportunity to go for morning runs, as well as do athletic exercises. In 2020 and 2021, the stadium hosted home matches for Obolon-2 in the Ukrainian Second League as well as Polissya Zhytomyr in the Ukrainian First League.

In October 2023 work was done to upgrade the pitch. On 25 November 2023, the president of Kudrivka, Roman Solodarenko, announced that the club would relocate to Irpin in 2024, leaving the Stadion Yuvileinyi.

=== New Tenants ===
Kudrivka used the stadium for their 2024–25 Ukrainian First League campaign.

In 2025 UCSA Tarasivka started using the stadium for its home games in the Ukrainian First League.

== Important matches ==
In 2016, the stadium was used for some 2017 UEFA European Under-19 Championship qualifying matches.

Date	Team #1	Result	Team #2	Round	Attendance	Source
6 October 2016	Latvia	2–2	Turkey	2017 UEFA European Under-19 Championship qualification	450	
8 October 2016	Turkey	2–1	Iceland	2017 UEFA European Under-19 Championship qualification	400	
11 October 2016	Iceland	2–0	Latvia	2017 UEFA European Under-19 Championship qualification	200	

== Gallery ==
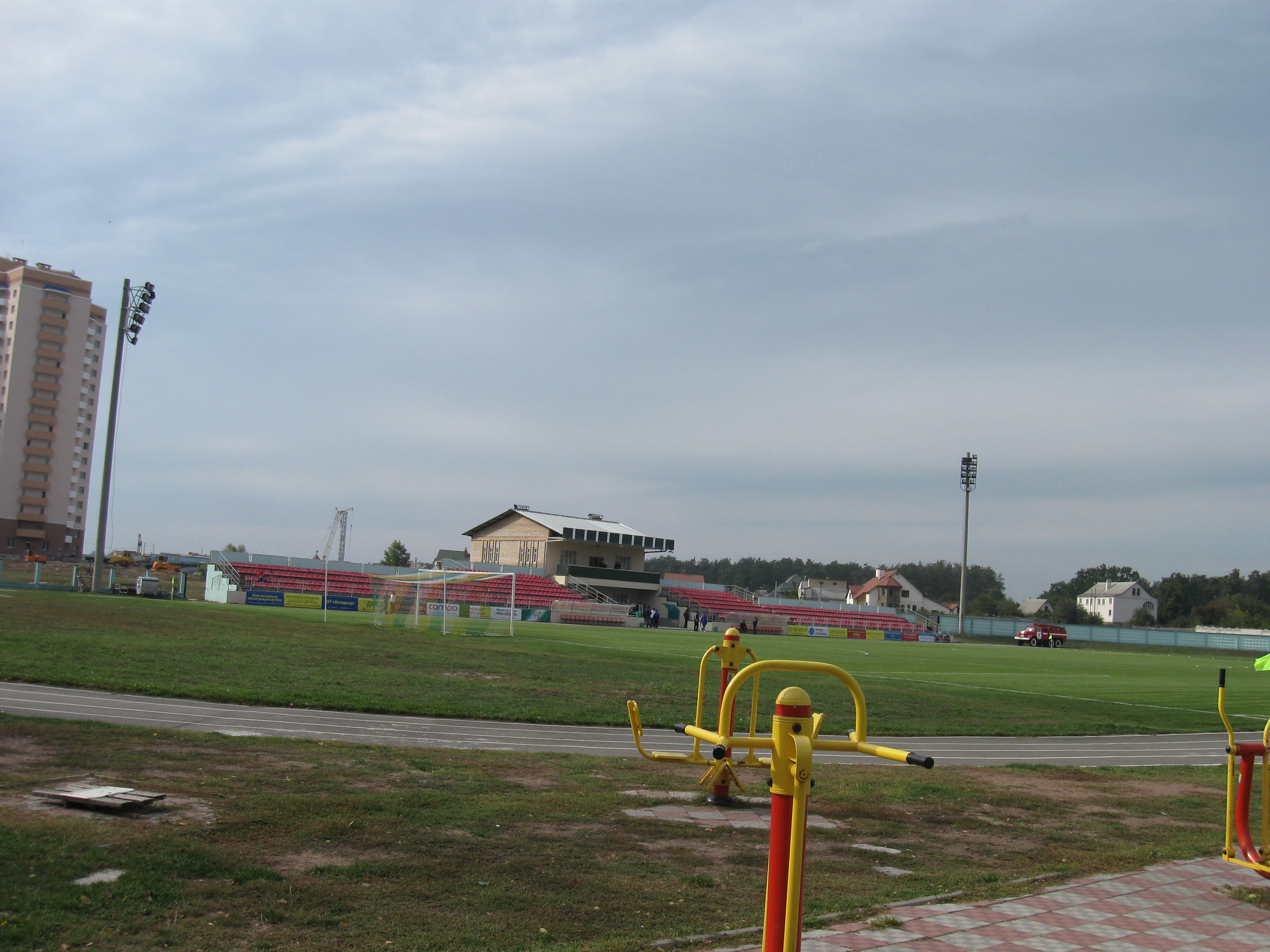
