= Kyrylo Lavuta =

Personal information
- Full name: Kyrylo Pavlovych Lavuta
- Date of birth: 21 June 2002 (age 24)
- Place of birth: Kharkiv, Ukraine
- Height: 1.85 m (6 ft 1 in)
- Position: Goalkeeper

Team information
- Current team: Kudrivka
- Number: 1

Youth career
- 2019–2020: Arsenal Kharkiv U17
- 2020–2021: Master of the Ball Kharkiv

Senior career*
| Years | Team | Apps | (Gls) |
| 2022–2023 | Metalurh-2 Zaporizhzhia | 17 | (0) |
| 2023–2024 | Metalurh Zaporizhzhia | 1 | (0) |
| 2024–2025 | Hirnyk-Sport | 17 | (0) |
| 2025–2026 | Vorskla Poltava | 30 | (0) |
| 2026– | Kudrivka | 1 | (0) |
- * Club domestic league appearances and goals as of 16 November 2026 ‡ National team caps and goals as of 16 November 2026

Kyrylo Pavlovych Lavuta (Ukrainian: Кирило Павлович Лавута; born 21 June 2002) is a Ukrainian professional footballer who plays as a goalkeeper for Kudrivka.

== Club career ==
Lavuta started playing football at the academies of Arsenal Kharkiv and for Master of the Ball Kharkiv. After this experience he was signed by Metalurh-2 Zaporizhzhia and then by Metalurh Zaporizhzhia the senior team. On 3 August 2024 he signed for Hirnyk-Sport in Ukrainian Second League, where he played 17 matches.

In the summer of 2025, he moved to the Ukrainian First League, where he made 30 appearances; during this period, there was interest in the player from UCSA Tarasivka, though a deal ultimately did not materialize following a few training sessions.

Following the reorganization of Kudrivka, he signed a contract with the team in the Ukrainian Premier League. On August 22, 2026, he makes his debut for his new team in the Ukrainian Cup against Avanhard Lozova. On 7 November 2026, he made his Ukrainian Premier League debut against Chornomorets Odesa , contributing to the victory by delivering an exemplary performance.

== Career statistics ==
=== Club ===
As of match played 16 November 2026

Appearances and goals by club, season and competition
| Club | Season | League | | | Cup | | Europe | | Other | | Total | |
| Club | Season | Division | Apps | Goals | Apps | Goals | Apps | Goals | Apps | Goals | Apps | Goals |
|---|---|---|---|---|---|---|---|---|---|---|---|---|
| Metalurh-2 Zaporizhzhia | 2022–23 | Ukrainian Second League | 9 | 0 | 0 | 0 | 0 | 0 | 0 | 0 | 9 | 0 |
| Metalurh-2 Zaporizhzhia | 2023–24 | Ukrainian Second League | 8 | 0 | 0 | 0 | 0 | 0 | 0 | 0 | 8 | 0 |
| Metalurh Zaporizhzhia | 2023–24 | Ukrainian First League | 1 | 0 | 1 | 0 | 0 | 0 | 0 | 0 | 2 | 0 |
| Hirnyk-Sport | 2024–25 | Ukrainian Second League | 17 | 0 | 0 | 0 | 0 | 0 | 0 | 0 | 17 | 0 |
| Vorskla Poltava | 2025–26 | Ukrainian First League | 30 | 0 | 1 | 0 | 0 | 0 | 0 | 0 | 31 | 0 |
| Kudrivka | 2026–27 | Ukrainian Premier League | 1 | 0 | 2 | 0 | 0 | 0 | 0 | 0 | 3 | 0 |
| Career total | | | 66 | 0 | 3 | 0 | 0 | 0 | 0 | 0 | 69 | 0 |
