= Yuriy Potimkov =

Ukrainian footballer

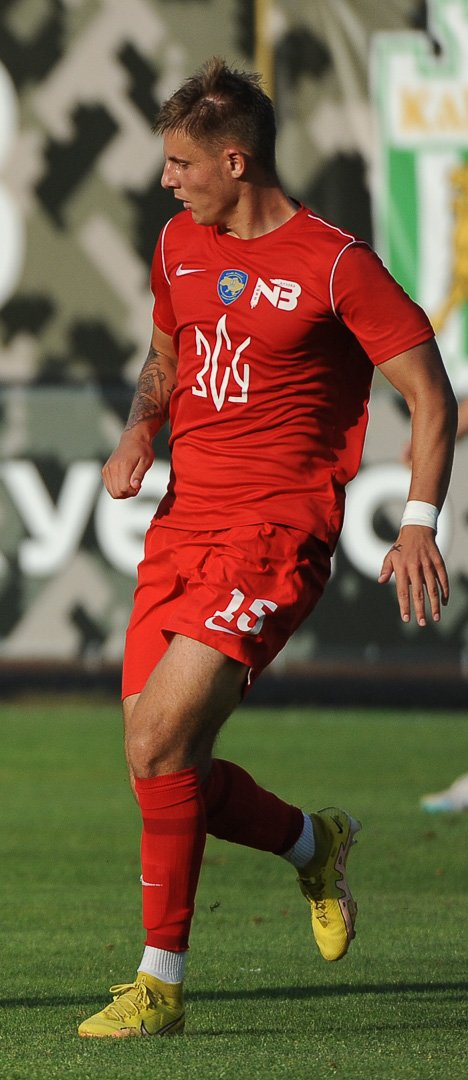

Personal information
- Full name: Yuriy Stefanovych Potimkov
- Date of birth: 1 August 2002 (age 24)
- Place of birth: Kharkiv, Ukraine
- Height: 1.92 m (6 ft 4 in)
- Position: Defender

Team information
- Current team: Kudrivka
- Number: 69

Youth career
- 2014–2016: Metalist Kharkiv
- 2016–2017: Arsenal Kharkiv
- 2017–2018: Metalist Kharkiv
- 2018–2019: Metalist 1925 Kharkiv

Senior career*
Years	Team	Apps	(Gls)
2019–2021	Avanhard Kharkiv	16	(2)
2021–2025	Metalist 1925 Kharkiv	5	(0)
2023	→ Nyva Buzova (loan)	5	(0)
2024–2025	→ Kudrivka (loan)	14	(1)
2025–	Kudrivka	13	(1)
- * Club domestic league appearances and goals as of 24 May 2026

Yuriy Stefanovych Potimkov (Ukrainian: Юрій Стефанович Потімков; born 1 August 2002) is a Ukrainian professional footballer who plays as a defender for Kudrivka.

== Career ==
Born in Kharkiv, Potimkov is a product of the local Metalist Kharkiv, Arsenal Kharkiv and Metalist 1925 Kharkiv youth sportive school systems.

He played for amateurs FC Avanhard Kharkiv in the championship of the Kharkiv Oblast, but in July 2021 Potimkov signed a contract with the Ukrainian Premier League side Metalist 1925 Kharkiv. He made his debut in the Ukrainian Premier League for Metalist 1925 as a second half-time substituted player in a losing away match against Veres Rivne on 22 November 2021.

== Career statistics ==
As of match played 5 June 2026

Appearances and goals by club, season and competition
Club	Season	League			Cup		Europe		Other		Total	
Club	Season	Division	Apps	Goals	Apps	Goals	Apps	Goals	Apps	Goals	Apps	Goals
Metalist 1925 Kharkiv	2021–22	Ukrainian Premier League	1	0	0	0	0	0	0	0	1	0
Metalist 1925 Kharkiv	2022–23	Ukrainian Premier League	4	0	0	0	0	0	0	0	4	0
Nyva Buzova (Loan)	2023–24	Ukrainian First League	5	0	0	0	0	0	0	0	5	0
Kudrivka	2024–25	Ukrainian First League	16	1	2	1	0	0	2	0	20	2
Kudrivka	2025–26	Ukrainian Premier League	8	0	0	0	0	0	2	0	10	0
Kudrivka	2026–27	Ukrainian Premier League	0	0	0	0	0	0	0	0	0	0
Career total			35	1	2	1	0	0	4	0	39	0
