= Valeriy Rohozynskyi =

Ukrainian footballer

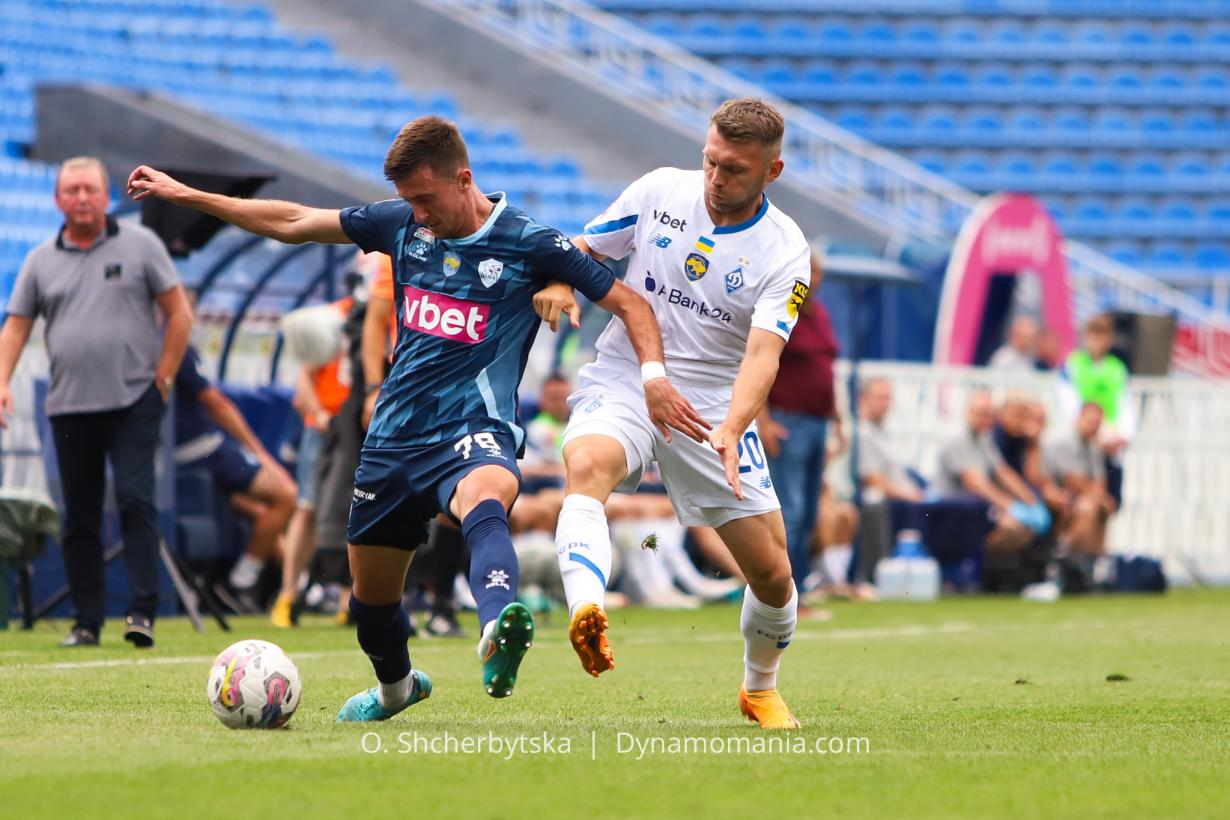

Personal information
- Full name: Valeriy Olehovych Rohozynskyi
- Date of birth: 3 September 1995 (age 31)
- Place of birth: Mykolaiv, Ukraine
- Height: 1.80 m (5 ft 11 in)
- Position: Left midfielder

Team information
- Current team: Chernihiv (on loan from Kudrivka)
- Number: 87

Youth career
- 2008–2009: DYuSSh Mykolaiv
- 2009–2012: Mykolaiv

Senior career*
Years	Team	Apps	(Gls)
2012	→ Mykolaiv-2	0	(0)
2013	Komunarovets Mykolaiv	0	(0)
2014	Ahrarnyk Kryve Ozero	5	(0)
2014–2015	Mykolaiv	24	(3)
2015–2016	Poltava	4	(0)
2016–2020	Mykolaiv	110	(7)
2017	→ Mykolaiv-2	0	(0)
2020–2022	Alians Lypova Dolyna	40	(3)
2022–2023	Mynai	41	(0)
2024	Nyva Buzova	10	(1)
2024–	Kudrivka	29	(4)
2026–	→ Chernihiv	13	(0)
- * Club domestic league appearances and goals as of 21 November 2026

Valeriy Olehovych Rohozynskyi (Ukrainian: Валерій Олегович Рогозинський; born 3 September 1995) is a Ukrainian professional footballer who plays as a left midfielder for Chernihiv on loan from Kudrivka.

== Career ==
=== Alians Lypova Dolyna ===
In 2020, he moved to Alians Lypova Dolyna in the Ukrainian First League. He was included in the Best XI of Round 5 and 8 of the 2021–22 Ukrainian First League.

=== Mynai ===
In August 2022, he signed for Mynai in Ukrainian Premier League. On 14 December 2023, after 41 matches, he was released by the club.

=== Nyva Buzova ===
On 25 January 2024, he moved to Nyva Buzova.

=== Kudrivka ===
Following the merger between Nyva Buzova and Kudrivka, he moved to Kudrivka just admitted in Ukrainian First League. In January 2026, he extended his contract with the club until 2027. In June 2026, some rumors linked him to move to Oleksandriya.

==== Chernihiv ====
On 2 July 2026, he was loaned to Chernihiv in Ukrainian First League, until the end of 2026. On 25 July 2026, he made his debut with the new club against Lokomotyv Kyiv.

== Career statistics ==
=== Club ===
As of match played 21 November 2026

Appearances and goals by club, season and competition
Club	Season	League			Cup		Europe		Other		Total	
Club	Season	Division	Apps	Goals	Apps	Goals	Apps	Goals	Apps	Goals	Apps	Goals
Mykolaiv	2014–15	Ukrainian First League	24	3	2	0	0	0	0	0	26	3
Poltava	2015–16	Ukrainian First League	13	0	1	0	0	0	0	0	14	0
Mykolaiv	2016–17	Ukrainian First League	28	5	4	0	0	0	0	0	32	4
Mykolaiv	2017–18	Ukrainian First League	31	2	1	0	0	0	0	0	32	2
Mykolaiv	2018–19	Ukrainian First League	25	0	1	0	0	0	0	0	26	0
Mykolaiv	2019–20	Ukrainian First League	17	0	4	0	0	0	0	0	21	0
Alians Lypova Dolyna	2019–20	Ukrainian First League	0	0	0	0	0	0	2	0	2	0
Alians Lypova Dolyna	2020–21	Ukrainian First League	25	1	2	0	0	0	0	0	27	1
Alians Lypova Dolyna	2021–22	Ukrainian First League	15	2	2	0	0	0	0	0	17	2
Mynai	2022–23	Ukrainian Premier League	28	0	0	0	0	0	0	0	28	0
Mynai	2023–24	Ukrainian Premier League	13	0	0	0	0	0	0	0	13	0
Nyva Buzova	2023–24	Ukrainian First League	10	1	0	0	0	0	0	0	10	1
Kudrivka	2024–25	Ukrainian First League	13	3	3	1	0	0	2	0	18	4
Kudrivka	2025–26	Ukrainian Premier League	10	1	1	0	0	0	0	0	11	1
Chernihiv (loan)	2026–27	Ukrainian First League	13	0	3	0	0	0	—		16	0
Chernihiv (loan)	Total		13	0	3	0	0	0	0	0	16	0
Career total			266	18	24	0	0	4	0	0	293	18
