= Kudrivka =

Rural locality in Chernihiv Oblast, Ukraine

Kudrivka Кудрівка
- Village
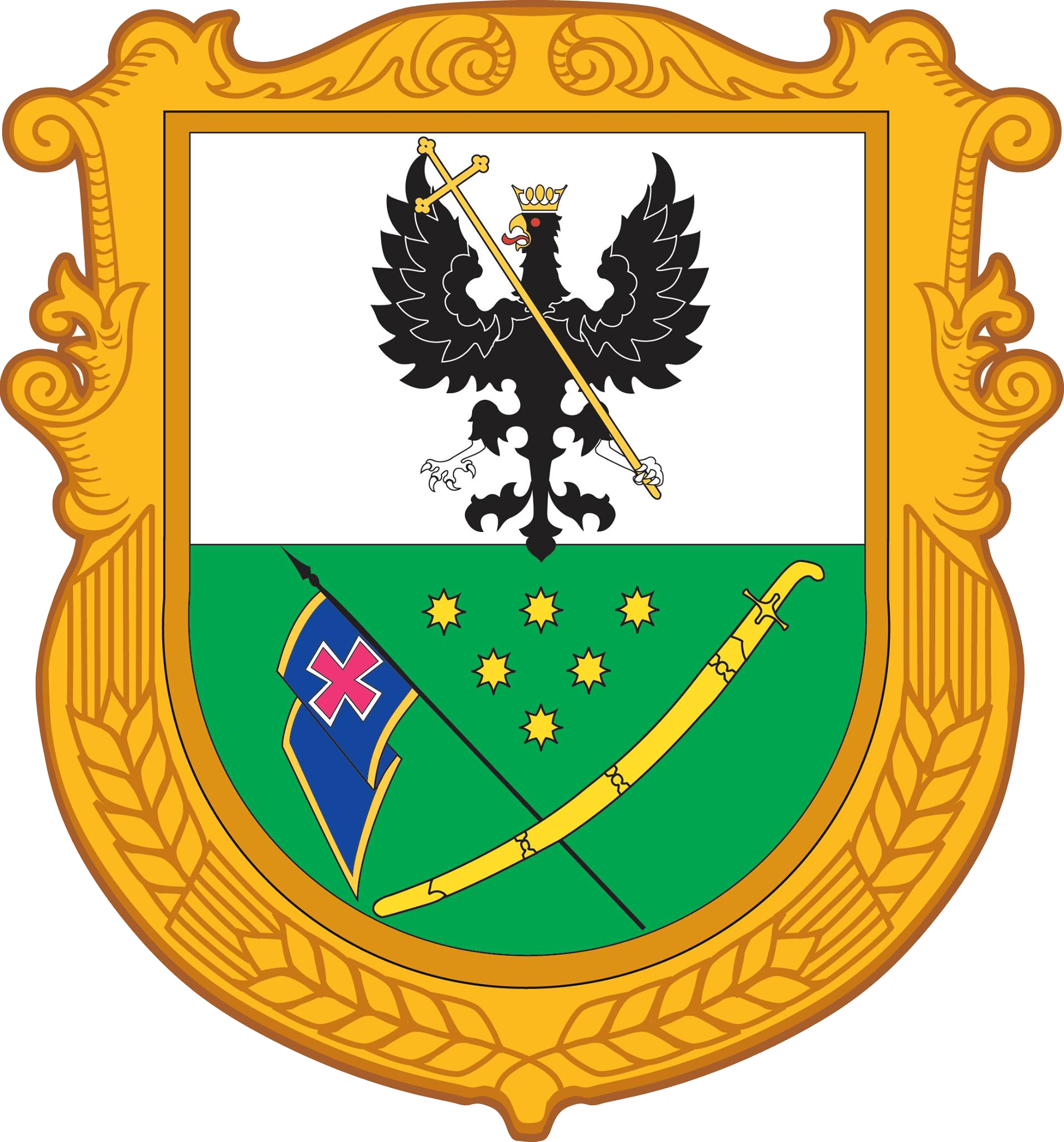
- Coat of arms

- Location within Chernihiv Oblast Location within Ukraine
- Coordinates: 51°38′58″N 32°37′41″E
- Country: Ukraine
- Oblast: Chernihiv
- Raion: Koriukivka Raion

Area
  - Total: 376 km^{2} (145 sq mi)

Population (2025)
  - Total: 838
  - Density: 2.23/km^{2} (5.77/sq mi)
- Postal code: 16122
- Area code: +380 4655

Kudrivka (Ukrainian: Кудрівка) is a village in the Sosnytsia Territorial Community of Chernihiv Raion of Chernihiv Oblast, Ukraine. The village council, located on the right bank of the Ubeda River, 18 km from the district seat.

== History ==
On July 19, 2020, as a result of the administrative-territorial reform and liquidation of the Sosnytsia district, it became part of the Koriukivka Raion of the Chernihiv Oblast.

In January 2022, following the closure of the school in the village of Kyriivka, Sosnytsia's community, the children were transferred to study in the village of Kudrivka, seven kilometers away. After the Russian invasion the village's community invited the displaced people to move to Kudrivka. In May 2024, families with 18 children moved to the village of Kudrivka. Some of them came from the occupied part of the Kherson region, the border region of the Chernihiv region and the Zhytomyr region. All of them were provided with free accommodation.

In 2025, the Kudrivka community has invited displaced people with children from the occupied territories, families who have lost their homes due to the war or who are in difficult living situations, to live permanently. They are provided with free accommodation.

== Sports and facilities ==
=== FC Kudrivka ===
The main club of the village is FC Kudrivka that in 2022 won the Chernihiv Oblast Football Cup. In 2023 the club was admitted to the 2023–24 Ukrainian Second League. In 2024, it merged with Nyva Buzova and was admitted to the Ukrainian First League. On 1 June 2025, Kudrivka was promoted to Ukrainian Premier League for the first time in their history.

=== Kudrivka Arena ===
The stadium of Kudrivka Arena is a home arena for FC Kudrivka. On 21 September 2024, Kudrivka Arena hosted a Ukrainian First League match for the first time, with FC Kudrivka drawing 1–1 with Metalist 1925 Kharkiv.

== Notable people ==
- Roman Solodarenko is a Ukrainian businessman and owner of the football club of FC Kudrivka.
