= Kostyantyn Bychek =

Ukrainian footballer

Personal information
- Full name: Kostyantyn Romanovych Bychek
- Date of birth: 21 April 2000 (age 26)
- Place of birth: Bila Tserkva, Ukraine
- Height: 1.78 m (5 ft 10 in)
- Position: Attacking midfielder

Team information
- Current team: Kudrivka
- Number: 77

Youth career
- 2013–2014: KOK DYuSSh Irpin
- 2014–2017: KODYuSSh Shchaslyve
- 2017: Zirka Kropyvnytskyi

Senior career*
Years	Team	Apps	(Gls)
2017–2019	Olimpik Donetsk	0	(0)
2019–2021	Karpaty Lviv	11	(3)
2021–2022	Nyva Ternopil	18	(3)
2022–2024	Metalist 1925 Kharkiv	39	(2)
2024–	Obolon Kyiv	37	(2)
2024–	Kudrivka	41	(0)
- * Club domestic league appearances and goals as of 6 September 2026

Kostyantyn Romanovych Bychek (Ukrainian: Костянтин Романович Бичек; born 21 April 2000) is a Ukrainian professional footballer who plays as an attacking midfielder for Ukrainian club Kudrivka.

== Career ==
On 2 August 2026, he signed for Kudrivka in Ukrainian Premier League.
