= Ivan Melnychenko =

Ukrainian footballer (born 2003)

Personal information
- Full name: Ivan Dmytrovych Melnychenko
- Date of birth: 16 August 2003 (age 23)
- Place of birth: Ukraine
- Height: 1.79 m (5 ft 10 in)
- Position: Midfielder

Team information
- Current team: Kolos-2 Kovalivka
- Number: 45

Senior career*
Years	Team	Apps	(Gls)
2022–2024	Mariupol	50	(2)
2025–2026	Kudrivka	3	(0)
2025–2026	→ Lokomotyv Kyiv (loan)	25	(11)
2026–	Kolos-2 Kovalivka	16	(3)
- * Club domestic league appearances and goals as of 21 November 2026 ‡ National team caps and goals as of 23 September 2025

Ivan Dmytrovych Melnychenko (Ukrainian: Іван Дмитрович Мельниченко; born 16 August 2003) is a Ukrainian professional footballer who plays as a midfielder for Kolos-2 Kovalivka.

== Club career ==
=== Early career ===
He started playing football at the academies of Polissya, Bukovyna, and Zhytomyr.

=== FSC Mariupol ===
In 2023 he signed for Mariupol in Ukrainian First League. On 2 August 2023, he made his debut in Ukrainian Cup against Vast Mykolaiv at the Kolos Stadium in Boryspil. On 13 September 2023 he scored against Chernihiv at the Yunist Stadium in Chernihiv. On 24 May 2024 he scored against Ahrobiznes Volochysk. In June 2024 he was elected best player of May according to the fans. In December 2024 his contract with the club expired after 52 games and 2 goals.

=== Kudrivka ===
In January 2025 he signed for Kudrivka in Ukrainian First League. He helped the club get promoted to the Premier League after a win against FC Vorskla Poltava on aggregate.

==== Loan to Lokomotyv Kyiv ====
On 1 August 2024, he was loaned to Lokomotyv Kyiv in Ukrainian Second League. On 13 September 2025 he scored his first goal with the new club against Oleksandriya-2.

=== Kolos-2 Kovalivka ===
In January 2025 he signed for Kolos-2 Kovalivka.

== Career statistics ==
=== Club ===
As of match played 21 November 2026

Appearances and goals by club, season and competition
Club	Season	League			Cup		Europe		Other		Total	
Club	Season	Division	Apps	Goals	Apps	Goals	Apps	Goals	Apps	Goals	Apps	Goals
Mariupol	2022–23	Ukrainian First League	16	0	0	0	0	0	1	0	17	0
Mariupol	2023–24	Ukrainian First League	24	2	4	0	0	0	0	0	28	2
Kudrivka	2024–25	Ukrainian First League	3	0	0	0	0	0	0	0	3	0
Lokomotyv Kyiv (Loan)	2025–26	Ukrainian Second League	25	11	3	0	0	0	1	0	29	11
Kolos-2 Kovalivka	2026–27	Ukrainian First League	16	3	0	0	0	0	0	0	16	3
Career total			84	16	7	0	0	0	2	0	93	16

== Honours ==
Lokomotyv Kyiv

- Ukrainian Second League: 2025–26 (Group B)
