= Andriy Storchous =

Ukrainian footballer

Personal information
- Full name: Andriy Storchous
- Date of birth: 30 June 1994 (age 32)
- Place of birth: Cherkasy, Ukraine
- Height: 1.74 m (5 ft 9 in)
- Position: Centre-back

Team information
- Current team: Oleksandriya

Youth career
- 2008–2010: Dnipro-80

Senior career*
Years	Team	Apps	(Gls)
2011–2012	Retro Vatutine	9	(2)
2014–2020	Cherkaskyi Dnipro	60	(8)
2016	→ Kremin Kremenchuk (loan)	18	(8)
2021–2023	LNZ Cherkasy	26	(6)
2023–2024	Druzhba Myrivka	26	(7)
2024–2026	Kudrivka	47	(17)
2026–	Oleksandriya	15	(0)

International career
2014	Ukraine U21	1	(0)
- * Club domestic league appearances and goals as of 22 November 2026

Andriy Volodymyrovych Storchous (Ukrainian: Андрій Володимирович Сторчоус; born 30 June 1994) is a Ukrainian professional footballer who plays as a centre-back for Oleksandriya in the Ukrainian First League.

== Playing career ==
=== Early career ===
Born in Cherkasy, Storchous is a graduate of the Dnipro-80 academy system. His first coaches were Ihor Stolovytskyi and Serhiy Usakovskyi. Storchous began his football career in 2012 playing for FC Retro from Vatutine in the 2012 Ukrainian Football Amateur League. In 2013, he moved to fellow amateur club FC Zoria-Akademiia Biloziria.

=== Cherkaskyi Dnipro ===
At the end of February 2015, he signed with Cherkaskyi Dnipro, helping the club win the Ukrainian Second League in his first season.

==== Kremin Kremenchuk ====
In 2016, Kremin Kremenchuk, a Ukrainian Second League club, invited Storchous for a trial, and he eventually earned a loan deal. He played 28 matches for Kremen in the Ukrainian Second League, scoring 13 goals.

=== Cherkaskyi Dnipro ===
In January 2017, he returned to Cherkaskyi Dnipro. He scored his first goal of the season on 2 June 2017 in 3–0 victory over Ternopil.

=== LNZ Cherkasy ===
In 2021 he moved to LNZ Cherkasy in the Ukrainian First League, where he helped the club earn promotion to the Ukrainian Premier League. In January 2023, he was released by the club.

=== Druzhba Myrivka ===
In 2023 he moved to Druzhba Myrivka in the Ukrainian Second League, where he helped the club win the league.

=== Nyva Buzova ===
In June 2024 he left LNZ Cherkasy and moved to Nyva Buzova.

=== Kudrivka ===
Following the merger between Nyva Buzova and Kudrivka, he moved to Kudrivka just admitted in Ukrainian First League. He helped the club to get the promotion to Ukrainian Premier League for the first time of the history of the club. On 14 May 2026, he scored two goals against Rukh Lviv at the Avanhard Stadium in Rivne. On 23 May 2026, he scored two goals against FC Dynamo Kyiv at the Valeriy Lobanovskyi Stadium in Kyiv, becoming the second top scorer of the season with 12 goals. Following his performance, he was included in the Best XI of Round 30 of the 2025–26 Ukrainian Premier League.

=== Oleksandriya ===
On 25 June 2026, he moved to Oleksandriya in the Ukrainian First League.

== Career statistics ==
As of match played 22 November 2026

Appearances and goals by club, season and competition
Club	Season	League			Cup		Europe		Other		Total	
Club	Season	Division	Apps	Goals	Apps	Goals	Apps	Goals	Apps	Goals	Apps	Goals
Cherkashchyna	2013–14	Ukrainian Second League	0	0	0	0	0	0	0	0	0	0
Cherkashchyna	2014–15	Ukrainian Second League	0	0	0	0	0	0	0	0	0	0
Cherkashchyna	2015–16	Ukrainian First League	3	0	1	0	0	0	0	0	4	0
Total			3	0	1	0	0	0	0	0	4	0
Kremin (Loan)	2016–17	Ukrainian Second League	18	8	0	0	0	0	0	0	18	8
Total			18	8	0	0	0	0	0	0	18	8
Cherkashchyna	2016–17	Ukrainian First League	11	1	1	0	0	0	0	0	12	1
Cherkashchyna	2017–18	Ukrainian First League	23	1	1	1	0	0	0	0	24	2
Cherkashchyna	2018–19	Ukrainian Second League	5	4	3	1	0	0	2	1	10	6
Cherkashchyna	2019–20	Ukrainian First League	18	2	0	0	0	0	0	0	18	2
Cherkashchyna	2020–21	Ukrainian Second League	0	0	0	0	0	0	0	0	0	0
Total			57	8	5	2	0	0	2	1	64	11
LNZ Cherkasy	2021–22	Ukrainian Second League	15	3	3	2	0	0	0	0	18	5
LNZ Cherkasy	2022–23	Ukrainian First League	11	3	0	0	0	0	0	0	11	3
Total			26	6	3	2	0	0	0	0	29	8
Druzhba Myrivka	2023–24	Ukrainian Second League	26	7	1	0	0	0	0	0	27	7
Total			26	7	1	0	0	0	0	0	27	7
Kudrivka	2024–25	Ukrainian First League	20	5	3	2	0	0	2	0	25	5
Kudrivka	2025–26	Ukrainian Premier League	27	12	1	0	0	0	1	0	29	12
Kudrivka	Total		47	17	4	2	0	0	3	0	54	19
Oleksandriya	2026–27	Ukrainian First League	15	0	3	0	0	0	0	0	18	0
Career total			191	46	17	6	0	0	5	1	214	53

== Honours ==
=== Club ===
Druzhba Myrivka

- Ukrainian Second League: 2023–24

Dnipro Cherkasy

- Ukrainian Second League: 2014–15
- Ukrainian First League runner-up: 2015–16
- Ukrainian Second League runner-up: 2018–19

=== Individual ===
- Best Young Player of Ukrainian Second League Round 30: 2023–24.
- Ukrainian Premier League Player of the Round: 2025-26 (Round 1),
- SportArena Player of the Round: 2025-26 (Round 1),
- Ukrainian Premier League Player of the Month: August 2025
- Ukrainian Premier League Player of the Round: 2025-26 (Round 30),
- SportArena Player of the Round: 2025-26 (Round 30)
- Ukrainian Premier League Player of the Month: May 2026
- FC Kudrivka Player of the Year: (1) 2025–26
