= Ivan Mamrosenko =

Ukrainian footballer

Personal information
- Full name: Ivan Dmytrovych Mamrosenko
- Date of birth: 27 March 2000 (age 26)
- Place of birth: Zaporizhzhia, Ukraine
- Height: 1.89 m (6 ft 2 in)
- Position: Centre-back

Team information
- Current team: Metalurh Zaporizhzhia
- Number: 91

Youth career
- 2011: Metalurh Zaporizhzhia
- 2013–2015: RVUFK Kyiv
- 2015–2017: Chornomorets Odesa

Senior career*
Years	Team	Apps	(Gls)
2016–2017	Chornomorets Odesa	0	(0)
2018–2019	Vorskla Poltava	0	(0)
2019–2020	Tavria-Skif Rozdol	2	(0)
2020–2021	Mariupol	1	(0)
2021–2023	Mariupol	24	(1)
2024	Nyva Buzova	6	(0)
2024–2026	Kudrivka	22	(1)
2026–	Metalurh Zaporizhzhia	5	(0)
- * Club domestic league appearances and goals as of 18 March 2026

Ivan Dmytrovych Mamrosenko (Ukrainian: Іван Дмитрович Мамросенко; born 27 March 2000) is a Ukrainian professional footballer who plays as a centre-back for Metalurh Zaporizhzhia.
