= Oleksandr Yevtushenko =

- Олександр Євтушенко
- Born: 27 September 1957; Uman, Ukrainian SSR, Soviet Union
- Died: 23 December 2020 (aged 63); Kyiv, Ukraine
- Education: Kyiv Art Institute

Oleksandr Mykolaiovych Yevtushenko (27 September 1957 – 23 December 2020) was a Ukrainian music journalist.

== Biography ==
He was born in Uman, Cherkasy region, in the Ukrainian SSR. Yevtushenko graduated from the Kyiv Art Institute in 1982. During the 1990s, he established independent Ukraine's first music publications, including the newspaper Audiotoloka and the magazine Halas. In the early 2000s, Yevtushenko worked as a music critic for Ukraina magazine. During his career, he authored several books on the Ukrainian music scene. He died in Kyiv due to complications from encephalopathy.

== Halas ==
Yevtushenko was the editor-in-chief of Halas (lit. 'Noise'), the first Ukrainian-language music magazine in independent Ukraine. Published between 1996 and 1998, the magazine released 13 issues, the earliest of which were printed in the Czech Republic. Yevtushenko wanted to promote Ukrainian artists and to have a counterbalance to the Russian music that was dominant in Ukraine back then. Funded by a software firm Quasar Micro, the magazine ceased operations in 1998 following financial hardship.

== Books ==
- Зірки «Червоної Рути» [Stars of "Chervona Ruta"] (PDF) (in Ukrainian). KM Academia. 1993.
- 100 альбомів з України : Вибрана дискографія [100 Albums from Ukraine: A Selected Discography] (in Ukrainian). Остання барикада- Центр. 2003.
- Українська рок-антологія: Легенди химерного краю [Ukrainian Rock Anthology: Legends of the Chimerical Land] (PDF) (in Ukrainian). Апостроф. 2004.
- Обличчя музики: Творчі портрети українських зірок [The Faces of Music: Creative Portraits of Ukrainian Stars] (in Ukrainian). Джура. 2006. ISBN 9789668650482.
- Андрій Середа та "КОМУ ВНИЗ": Музика Високого Духу [Andriy Sereda and "KOMU VNYZ": Music of the High Spirit] (in Ukrainian). Атлант ЮЕмСі. 2008. ISBN 9789668968204.
- Україна IN ROCK [Ukraine IN ROCK] (in Ukrainian). Грані-Т. 2011. ISBN 9789664653418.
