= Artem Lyehostayev =

Ukrainian footballer

Personal information
- Full name: Artem Lyehostayev
- Date of birth: 11 August 2002 (age 24)
- Place of birth: Kryvyi Rih, Ukraine
- Height: 1.74 m (5 ft 9 in)
- Position: Striker

Team information
- Current team: Viktoriya Sumy
- Number: 70

Youth career
- 2019: Kryvbas Kryvyi Rih

Senior career*
Years	Team	Apps	(Gls)
2021–2022	PS Kemi	15	(9)
2023	Sokół Ostróda	16	(1)
2023	Karpaty-2 Lviv	9	(0)
2023–2026	Kudrivka	59	(7)
2026–	Viktoriya Sumy	15	(1)
- * Club domestic league appearances and goals as of 21 November 2026

Artem Serhiiovych Lyehostayev (Ukrainian: Артем Сергійович Лєгостаєв; born 11 August 2002) is a Ukrainian professional footballer who plays as a centre-back for Viktoriya Sumy.

== Playing career ==
=== Early career ===
Born in Kryvyi Rih, Lyehostayev is a graduate of the Kryvbas Kryvyi Rih academy system. In 2021 he played for the Finnish team PS Kemi and in 2023 he played for a short time for the Polish team Sokół Ostróda. In 2023 he played also for Karpaty-2 Lviv in Lviv Oblast.

=== Kudrivka ===
In March 2024, he signed for Kudrivka in Ukrainian First League. On 1 June 2025, he helped the club to secure promotion to Ukrainian Premier League after win against FC Vorskla Poltava on aggregate 1–1 and win penalty 3–4. In summer 2025, many clubs from polish Ekstraklasa, such as ŁKS Łódź were interested on him.

On 3 August 2025, he made his debut in Ukrainian Premier League against Oleksandriya at the Obolon Arena in Kyiv. On 11 August 2025, he scored his first goal in Ukrainian Premier League against Zorya Luhansk at the Lobanovskyi Stadium in Kyiv.

On 9 June 9, he scored against Ahrobiznes Volochysk in the play-offs which ended on penalties where Artem scored the fifth penalty of the victory allowing Kudrivka to remain in the Ukrainian Premier League. After unsuccessful negotiations for a loan to Chernihiv, he was released by the club on 16 July 2026.

=== Viktoriya Sumy ===
On 21 July 2026, he signed for Viktoriya Sumy.

== Career statistics ==
As of match played 21 November 2026

Appearances and goals by club, season and competition
Club	Season	League			Cup		Europe		Other		Total	
Club	Season	Division	Apps	Goals	Apps	Goals	Apps	Goals	Apps	Goals	Apps	Goals
Sokół Ostróda	2022–23	III liga	16	1	0	0	0	0	0	0	16	1
Total			16	1	0	0	0	0	0	0	16	1
Karpaty-2 Lviv	2023–24	Ukrainian Second League	9	0	0	0	0	0	0	0	9	0
Total			9	0	0	0	0	0	0	0	9	0
Kudrivka	2023–24	Ukrainian Second League	9	0	0	0	0	0	0	0	9	0
Kudrivka	2024–25	Ukrainian First League	24	6	2	0	0	0	2	0	28	6
Kudrivka	2025–26	Ukrainian Premier League	26	1	0	0	0	0	2	1	27	2
Kudrivka	Total		59	7	2	0	0	0	4	1	65	8
Viktoriya Sumy	2026–27	Ukrainian First League	15	1	1	0	0	0	0	0	16	1
Total			15	1	1	0	0	0	0	0	16	1
Career total			93	9	3	0	0	0	4	1	99	10
