= Vladyslav Rybak =

Ukrainian footballer

Personal information
- Full name: Vladyslav Mykolayovych Rybak
- Date of birth: 5 July 2001 (age 25)
- Place of birth: Kochubiyivka, Cherkasy Oblast, Ukraine
- Height: 1.92 m (6 ft 4 in)
- Position: Goalkeeper

Team information
- Current team: Metalist Kharkiv
- Number: 25

Youth career
- 2013–2014: Youth Sportive School Uman
- 2014–2016: UTK Uman
- 2016–2017: Nyva Vinnytsia

Senior career*
Years	Team	Apps	(Gls)
2017–2018	Bazys Kochubiyivka	23	(0)
2018–2021	Zorya Luhansk	0	(0)
2021–2022	Olimpik Donetsk	10	(0)
2022–26	Metalist Kharkiv	99	(0)
2022–2023	→ Dnipro-1 (loan)	13	(0)
2026 -	FC Zorya Luhansk	4	(0)
- * Club domestic league appearances and goals as of 14/10/26 @ 17:53(AEST)

Vladyslav Mykolayovych Rybak (Ukrainian: Владислав Миколайович Рибак; born 5 July 2001) is a Ukrainian professional footballer who plays as a goalkeeper for Metalist Kharkiv.

== Career ==
Rybak, born in Kochubiyivka, Uman Raion is a product of neighbouring Youth Sportive School Uman and UTK Uman systems. After played at the amateurs level in his native village, he signed contract with the Ukrainian Premier League Zorya Luhansk.

In January 2022, Rybak joined Ukrainian First League club Metalist Kharkiv.

== Honours ==
Dnipro-1

- Ukrainian Premier League runner-up: 2022–23
