= Raymond Owusu =

Ghanaian footballer (born 2002)

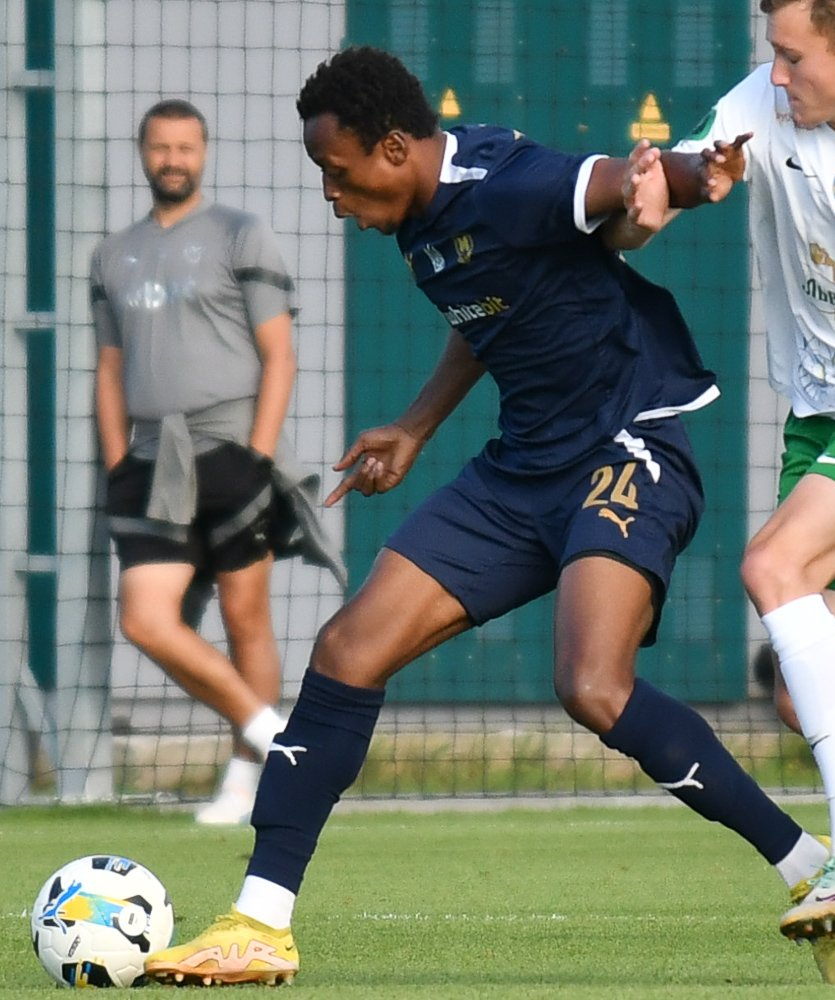

Personal information
- Full name: Raymond Frimpong Owusu
- Date of birth: 20 April 2002 (age 24)
- Place of birth: Kumasi, Ghana
- Height: 1.86 m (6 ft 1 in)
- Position: Forward

Team information
- Current team: Kudrivka (on loan from Metalist 1925 Kharkiv)
- Number: 24

Youth career
- –2021: Gold Coast Football Academy

Senior career*
Years	Team	Apps	(Gls)
2020–2021	→ Asokwa Deportivo (loan)		
2021–2022	Zorya Luhansk	14	(4)
2022–2023	İstanbulspor	1	(0)
2023–	Metalist 1925 Kharkiv	21	(1)
2025	→ SV Horn (loan)	9	(5)
2025–	→ Kudrivka (loan)	35	(3)
- * Club domestic league appearances and goals as of 7 November 2026

Raymond Frimpong Owusu (born 20 April 2002) is a Ghanaian professional footballer who plays as a forward who plays for Kudrivka on loan from Metalist 1925.

== Club career ==
=== Early Career ===
In March 2021, Owusu moved to Ukrainian club Zorya Luhansk. In the 2022 Russian invasion of Ukraine, Owusu fled the country and began training with Borussia Dortmund.

=== İstanbulspor ===
Owusu joined recently promoted Süper Lig club İstanbulspor on 17 August 2022, signing a one-year contract. He made his competitive debut for the club on 17 September, replacing Jetmir Topalli in the 60th minute of a 2–2 league draw against Beşiktaş.

==== Loan to Kudrivka ====
On 6 September 2025 he was loaned to Kudrivka in Ukrainian Premier League.

== Career statistics ==
As of match played 7 November 2026

Appearances and goals by club, season and competition
Club	Season	League			Cup		Europe		Other		Total	
Club	Season	Division	Apps	Goals	Apps	Goals	Apps	Goals	Apps	Goals	Apps	Goals
Kudrivka (Loan)	2025–26	Ukrainian Premier League	23	1	1	0	0	0	2	0	26	1
Kudrivka (Loan)	2026–27	Ukrainian Premier League	12	2	1	0	0	0	0	0	13	2
Kudrivka (Loan)	Total		35	3	2	0	0	0	2	0	39	3
Career total			0	0	0	0	0	0	0	0	0	0
