= Rodion Plaksa =

Ukrainian footballer

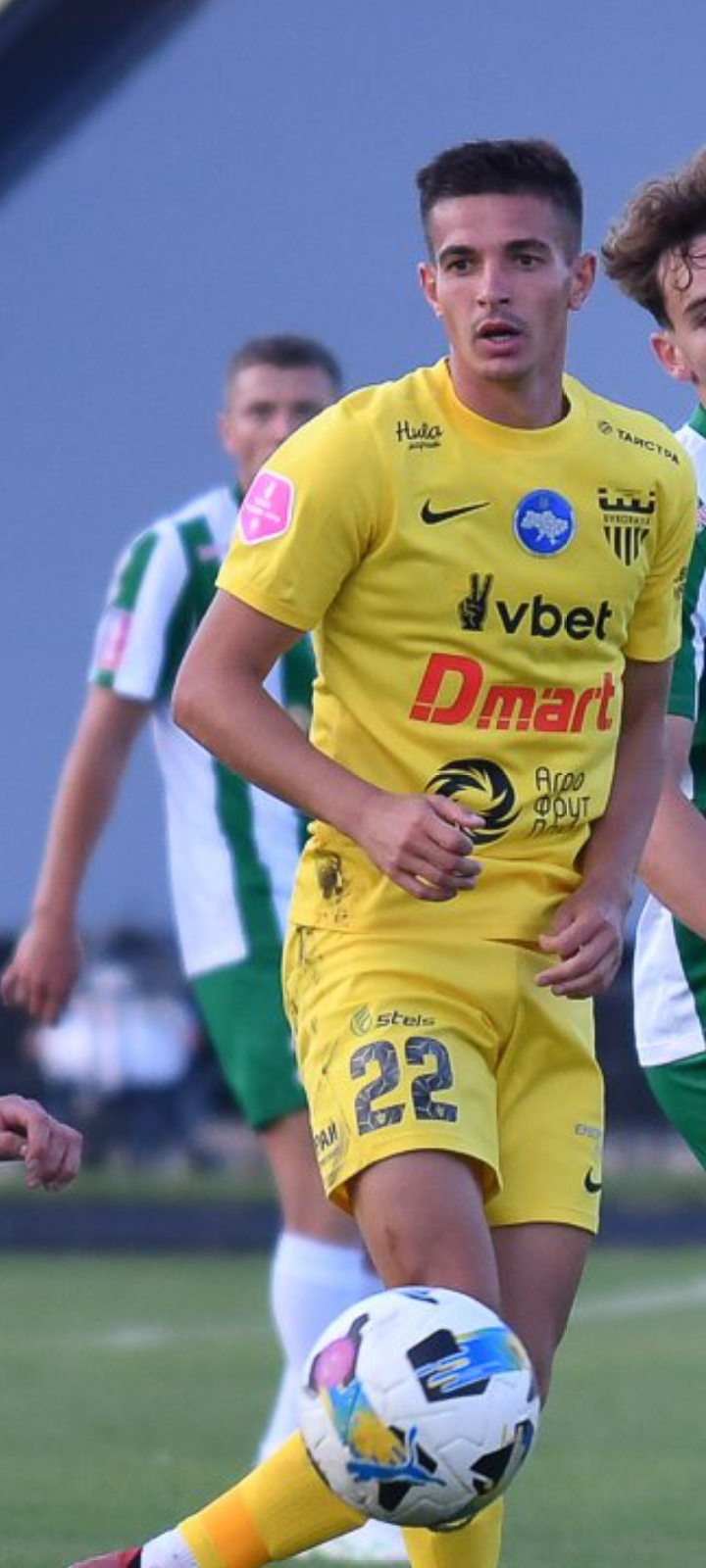

Personal information
- Full name: Rodion Olehovych Plaksa
- Date of birth: 22 January 2002 (age 24)
- Place of birth: Vuhledar, Ukraine
- Height: 1.73 m (5 ft 8 in)
- Position: Attacking midfielder

Team information
- Current team: Kudrivka
- Number: 10

Youth career
- 2015–2016: Shakhtar Donetsk
- 2016–2019: Azovstal Mariupol

Senior career*
Years	Team	Apps	(Gls)
2019–2022	Mariupol	5	(0)
2022–2023	Chornomorets Odesa	8	(0)
2023–2024	Oleksandriya	11	(2)
2024	→ Mariupol (loan)	9	(1)
2024	→ Oleksandriya-2	7	(4)
2025–2026	Bukovyna Chernivtsi	27	(3)
2025	→ Bukovyna-2 Chernivtsi	5	(1)
2026–	Kudrivka	7	(0)
- * Club domestic league appearances and goals as of 7 November 2026

Rodion Olehovych Plaksa (Ukrainian: Родіон Олегович Плакса; born 22 January 2002) is a Ukrainian professional footballer who plays as an attacking midfielder for Kudrivka.

== Career ==
Plaksa is a product of Shakhtar Donetsk and Azovstal Mariupol academies. He made his debut for Mariupol in the Ukrainian Premier League as a start squad player in the losing away match against Shakhtar Donetsk on 30 October 2020.

On 14 July 2026, he signed for Kudrivka in Ukrainian Premier League.
