= Roman Lyopka =

Ukrainian footballer

Personal information
- Full name: Roman Yuriyovych Lyopka
- Date of birth: 26 January 1997 (age 29)
- Place of birth: Pervomaisk, Ukraine
- Height: 1.89 m (6 ft 2 in)
- Position: Goalkeeper

Team information
- Current team: Lokomotyv Kyiv
- Number: 1

Youth career
- 2010–2013: UOR Simferopol

Senior career*
Years	Team	Apps	(Gls)
2014–2018	Zirka Kropyvnytskyi	12	(0)
2019	Nyva Vinnytsia	3	(0)
2019–2020	Inhulets Petrove	0	(0)
2020–2022	Kryvbas Kryvyi Rih	21	(0)
2022–2023	Karpaty Lviv	13	(0)
2023–2024	Nyva Buzova	11	(0)
2024–2026	Kudrivka	8	(0)
2026–	Lokomotyv Kyiv	11	(0)
- * Club domestic league appearances and goals as of 3 November 2026

Roman Yuriyovych Lyopka (Ukrainian: Роман Юрійович Льопка; born 26 January 1997) is a Ukrainian professional footballer who plays as a goalkeeper for Lokomotyv Kyiv.

== Career ==
Lyopka is a product of UOR Simferopol Youth Sportive School System.

He made his debut for FC Zirka in the game against FC Poltava on 15 November 2014 in the Ukrainian First League.

Following the merger between Nyva Buzova and Kudrivka, he moved to Kudrivka just admitted in Ukrainian First League. On 1 June 2025, he heped the club to secure promotion to Ukrainian Premier League after win against FC Vorskla Poltava on aggregate 1–1 and win penalty 3–4. On 26 June 2026, his contract was expired and he wasn't renewed.

On 14 July 2026 he signed for Lokomotyv Kyiv just promoted in Ukrainian First League. On 25 July 2026 he made his debut with the new club against Chernihiv.

== Honours ==
Zirka Kropyvnytskyi

- Ukrainian First League: 2015–16
