= Roman Solodarenko =

Ukrainian businessman (born 1984)

- Роман Васильович Солодаренко

President of the Chernihiv Regional Football Association
- Incumbent
- Assumed office 18 January 2024

Personal details
- Born: Роман Васильович Солодаренко; 26 January 1984 (age 42) Kudrivka, Chernihiv Oblast, Ukrainian SSR, Soviet Union
- Height: 6 ft 1 in (1.85 m)
- Occupation: Chairman of Kudrivka Chairman of Niva Buzova (from november 2023, until May 2024)
Association football career

Roman Vasyliovych Solodarenko (Ukrainian: Роман Васильович Солодаренко, born 26 January 1984) is a Ukrainian businessman. He is the chairman of the football club Kudrivka.

== Biography ==
Solodarenko was born in the village of Kudrivka in Chernihiv Oblast, Ukrainian SSR, Soviet Union. In 2018, he was elected an honorary citizen of Sosnytsia. In 2023, he opened a Kraft cheese production plant in Kudrivka. In December of that year, he tried to acquire the football club Desna Chernihiv but did not succeed. In 2024 he was appointed chairman of the Chernihiv Regional Football Association.

== Sports ==
=== Kudrivka ===
In 2006, Roman and his brother Vasyl purchased FC Kudrivka, their hometown club. In recent years, he has managed to lead the club from the regional championship to the Ukrainian Premier League in 2025.

=== Nyva Buzova ===
In 2023 Ihor Zhabchenko, the club's manager, confirmed that the president of the club planned to shutter football operations. Roman Solodarenko managed to acquire Nyva Buzova. In 2024, it merged with FC Kudrivka.

== Personal life ==
He has a son, Timofiy Solodarenko, who recently moved to Werder Bremen U17.

== See also ==
- Kudrivka
- Niva Buzova
