= FC Kudrivka =

Kudrivka
- Full name: Football Club Kudrivka
- Founded: 1982; 44 years ago
- Ground: Kudrivka Arena; Yunist Stadium (selected matches); Chernihiv Arena (selected matches); Stadium Yuvileinyi (selected matches)
- Capacity: 500
- Chairman: Roman Solodarenko
- Manager: Oleksandr Protchenko
- League: Ukrainian Premier League
- 2025–26: Ukrainian Premier League, 13th of 16
- Website: https://fckudrivka.com/
Home colours	Away colours	Third colours

Football Club Kudrivka (Ukrainian: Футбольний клуб «Кудрівка») is a Ukrainian professional football club based in Kudrivka, Chernihiv Oblast. They currently play in the Ukrainian Premier League, the top tier of Ukrainian football, after promotion from the Ukrainian First League in 2025.

== History ==
The club was established in June 1982. The club won the Chernihiv Oblast Football Cup in 2016, 2019 and in 2021. In the season 2020–21 and 2021–22, the club played in Ukrainian Football Amateur League. In 2022 the club won the Chernihiv Oblast Football Cup. In March 2023, the club won the Super Cup of Chernihiv Oblast against Khvylia. The match was played in Yunist Stadium. Volodymyr Kurbakov, the deputy chairman of the national olympic committee, awarded Nazar Voloshyn as the top scorer of the competition.

=== Ukrainian Second League ===
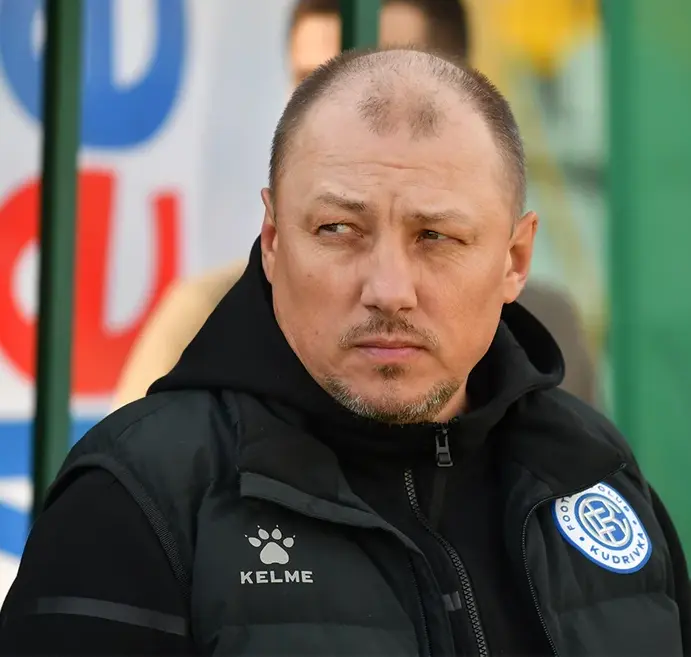
Vasyl Baranov, the coach who led the club to promotion to the Ukrainian Premier League in 2025

In 2023 the club was admitted to the 2023–24 Ukrainian Second League.

The club has started to strengthen with the addition of some experienced players such as Denys Skepskyi, Myroslav Serdyuk, Yevhen Chepurnenko, Maksym Leshchenko, Dmytro Kulyk and Artem Lyehostayev. In 2023 as coach was hired Serhiy Datsenko despite the results of the club were quite good, he was sacked by the management's club and replaced by Roman Loktionov.

Dmytro Kulyk became the top scorer of the Ukrainian Cup together with Andriy Shtohrin. On 25 November 2023, the club's president, Roman Solodarenko, announced that the club would relocate to Irpin in 2024. The club's president bought the Ukrainian First League club Nyva Buzova, and it was merged with FC Kudrivka.

=== Ukrainian First League ===
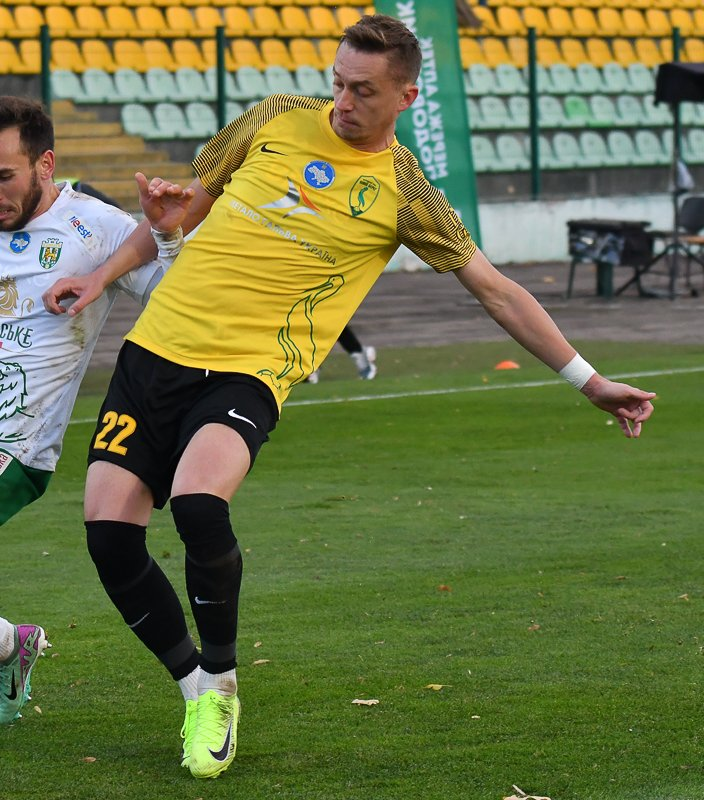
Vladyslav Shapoval, played for the club in 2025

The club began to use the Stadium Yuvileinyi primarily for matches in the Ukrainian First League. The club was included in group B, finishing first and entering the promotion play-offs for the Ukrainian Premier League. On 1 June 2025, Kudrivka secure promotion to the Premier League for the first time in their history after win against FC Vorskla Poltava on aggregate.

=== Ukrainian Premier League ===
In June 2025, the club opted to use the Obolon Arena for the first season in Ukrainian Premier League. The club signed some players, such as Illya Karavashchenko, Andriy Totovytskyi, Denys Bezborodko and Vladyslav Shapoval. On 3 August 2025, the club won its first match in the Ukrainian Premier League against Oleksandriya at the Obolon Arena in Kyiv. In February 2026 the club played its home games in Avanhard Stadium. On 5 May 2026 Oleksandr Protchenko replaced Vasyl Baranov as coach of the club. The club managed to remain in the Ukrainian Premier League after finishing in 14th place and winning a play-off against Ahrobiznes Volochysk decided by a 3–2 penalty shootout following draws in both the home and away legs.

=== Reorganization ===
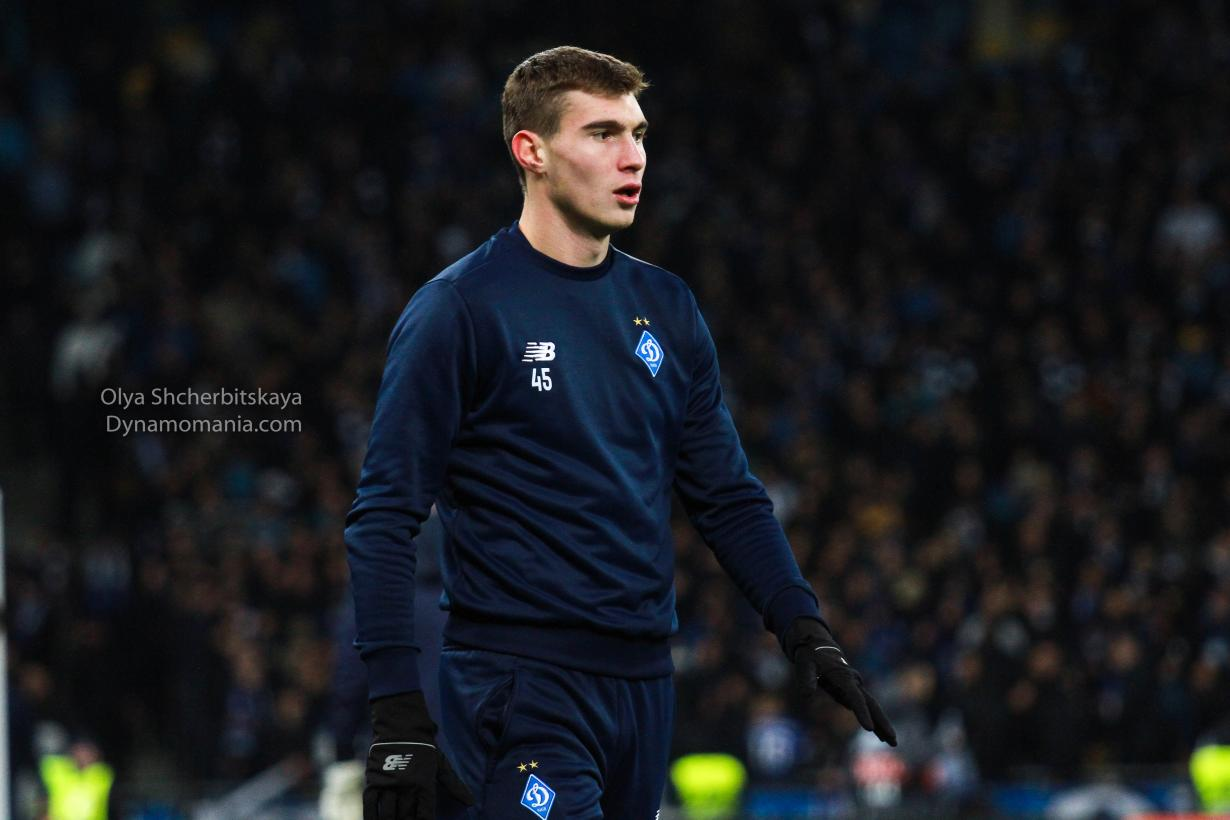
Yevheniy Smyrnyi signed for the club in 2026

After remaining in the Ukrainian Premier League, Oleksandr Protchenko was confirmed as the team's manager. The club underwent a clear-out and a rebuilding process, specifically involving players such as Oleksiy Husyev, Denys Nahnoynyi, Maryan Faryna, Anton Hlushchenko, and Oleh Pushkaryov all left the club and returned to their respective parent clubs following the end of their loan spells. The club got rid of some players such as Artem Machelyuk, Illya Karavashchenko, Yevheniy Morozko, Ivan Melnychenko, Artem Lyehostayev, Alban Taipi, Roman Lyopka, Oleksandr Kozak and striker Andriy Storchous. The club has sent Valeriy Rohozynskyi and Jair Collahuazo out on loan to FC Chernihiv and Taawoun, respectively. Many new players joined the club as Yevheniy Smyrnyi, Anton Demchenko, Ivan Melnychenko, Yevhen Pasich, Rodion Plaksa, Dmytro Semenov, Ivan Petryak, Kyrylo Siheyev, Kostyantyn Bychek and the return of Mykola Vechurko. Despite these changes of players the team did not start the season very well and there were also talk of delays in the payment of players' salaries. Rumors suggest that Kudrivka is on the brink of financial collapse, risking an inability to finish the Premier League season due to debts, with the club's president reportedly seeking a way out of this deep crisis.

== Stadium ==
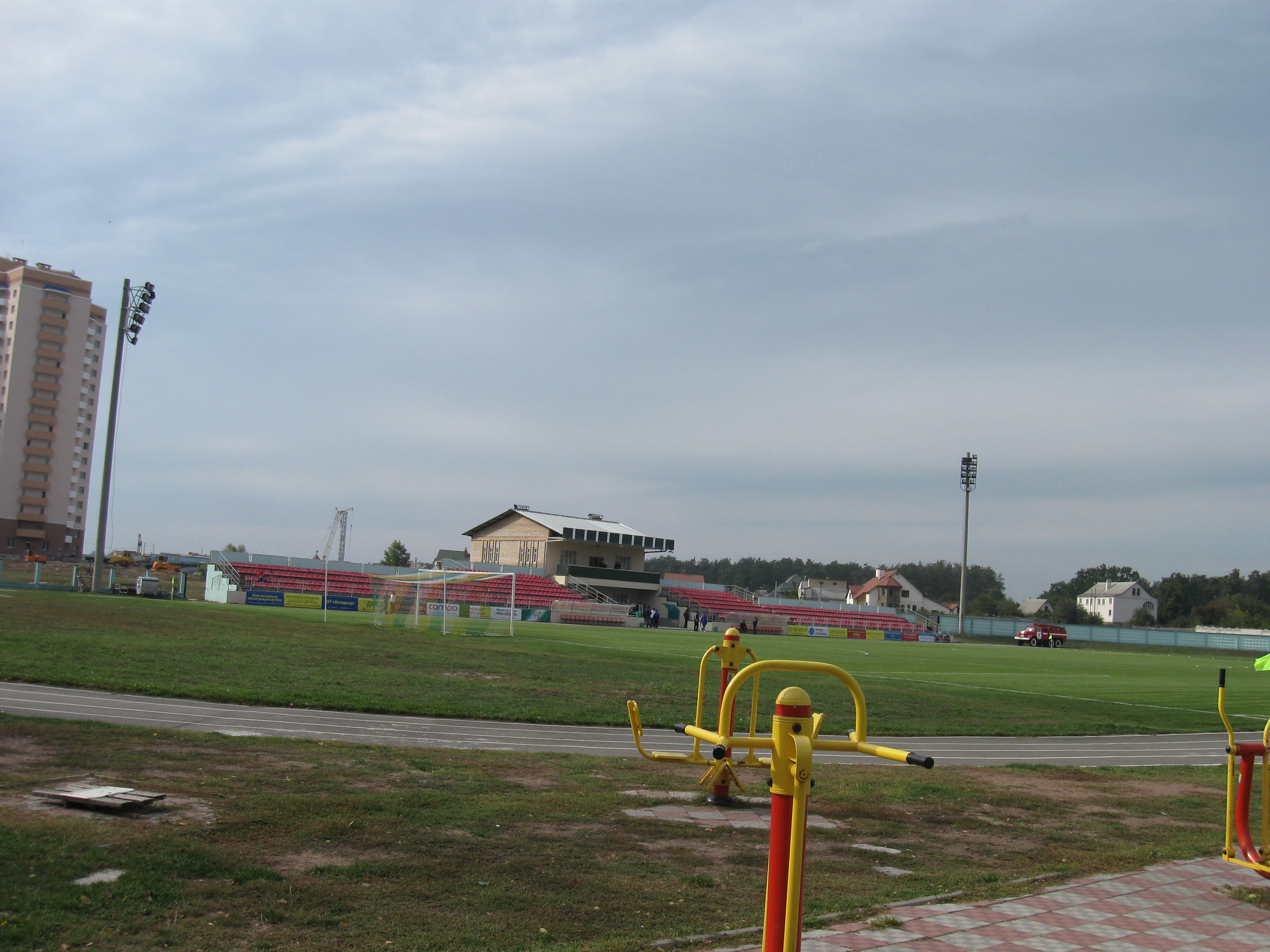
Stadion Yuvileinyi in Bucha

The club plays at Kudrivka Arena in Kudrivka built in 2018. The club used the Yunist Stadium and in 2024 with the relocation to Irpin started using the Stadium Yuvileinyi for the Ukrainian First League matches. Following the merger of Nyva Buzova with FC Kudrivka, the club inherited the Buzova Arena, which has been transformed into a football base used for scouting new players and by the youth team. Following its promotion to the Ukrainian Premier League, the club used the Obolon Arena until the end of 2025. In February 2026 the club changed stadium and started playing its home games in Avanhard Stadium in Rivne.

== Players ==
=== Current squad ===
As of 14 August 2026 Note: Flags indicate national team as defined under FIFA eligibility rules; some limited exceptions apply. Players may hold more than one non-FIFA nationality.

No.	Pos.	Nation	Player
1	GK	UKR	Kyrylo Lavuta
6	MF	UKR	Mykola Vechurko
7	MF	UKR	Ivan Petryak
8	DF	UKR	Yevheniy Smyrnyi
9	FW	PAN	Reynaldiño Verley (on loan from Alianza)
10	MF	UKR	Rodion Plaksa
11	FW	UKR	Roman Solodarenko
12	GK	UKR	Oleksandr Chobitko
14	MF	CGO	Kaya Makosso
17	DF	UKR	Myroslav Serdyuk (vice-captain)
19	MF	UKR	Artur Dumanyuk (3rd captain)
20	FW	UKR	Denys Svityukha
21	MF	UKR	Oleksandr Byelyayev
22	MF	UKR	Bohdan Veklyak
23	FW	UKR	Oleksandr Yushchenko (on loan from Shakhtar Donetsk)
24	FW	GHA	Raymond Owusu (on loan from Kharkiv)

No.	Pos.	Nation	Player
25	DF	UKR	Mykola Oharkov (on loan from Shakhtar Donetsk)
29	MF	NGR	Victor Adeoye
37	GK	UKR	Anton Yashkov (captain)
38	MF	ARG	Matías Rosales
42	MF	UKR	Yevhen Pasich
45	FW	NGR	Isiaka Saheed Abdulazeez
50	DF	UKR	Dmytro Semenov
66	MF	UKR	Kyrylo Siheyev (on loan from Shakhtar Donetsk)
69	DF	UKR	Yuriy Potimkov
70	MF	UKR	Demyan Yesin
71	MF	UKR	Serhiy Sten
73	GK	UKR	Mykhaylo Kulyk
77	MF	UKR	Kostyantyn Bychek
91	DF	UKR	Maksym Melnychuk
97	FW	UKR	Anton Demchenko

=== Out on loan ===
Note: Flags indicate national team as defined under FIFA eligibility rules; some limited exceptions apply. Players may hold more than one non-FIFA nationality.

No. / Pos. / Nation / Player; — / MF / UKR / Valeriy Rohozynskyi (at Chernihiv until 31 December 2026)	No. / Pos. / Nation / Player; — / MF / ECU / Jair Collahuazo (at Al Taawoun until 30 June 2027)

=== Other players under contract ===
Note: Flags indicate national team as defined under FIFA eligibility rules; some limited exceptions apply. Players may hold more than one non-FIFA nationality.

No. / Pos. / Nation / Player	No. / Pos. / Nation / Player

== League and cup history ==
Season	Div.	Pos.	Pl.	W	D	L	GS	GA	P	Domestic Cup	Europe		Notes
2020–21	4th "2" (Amateur League)	4	13	3	4	0	37	16	42				
2021–22	4th "2" (Amateur League)	2	9	7	2	0	26	4	25	-	-	-	
no participation due to war conditions													Admitted
2023–24	3rd "A" (Second League)	7	26	10	7	9	33	40	37	1/32 finals	-	-	merged with Nyva Buzova/Promoted to Ukrainian First League
2024–25	2nd "B" (First League)	4	22	10	5	7	25	18	35	1/16 finals	-	-	Promoted to Ukrainian Premier League win play-off Vorskla Poltava1:2 1:0 (4:3 pen)
2025–26	1st (Premier League)	13	30	7	7	16	32	48	28	1/32 finals	-	-	Relegation play-offs:Ahrobiznes Volochysk 0:0 2:2 (3:2 pen.)
2026–27	1st (Premier League)	15	3	2	2	8	12	29	8	1/16 finals	-	-	TBD

== Honours ==
=== Domestic competitions ===
Chernihiv Oblast Football Championship

- Winners (2): 2022, 2025

Chernihiv Oblast Football Cup

- Winners (6): 2016 2019, 2021, 2022, 2025, 2026

Chernihiv Oblast Super Cup:

- Winners (3):2021, 2022, 2026

Kyiv Oblast Football Federation

- Winners (1): 2020

Kyiv Oblast Football Cup

- Winners (1): 2021

=== Individual Player & Coach awards ===
Top Scorer of Ukrainian Cup

- (Ukraine) Dmytro Kulyk: 2023–24 (4 goals together with Andriy Shtohrin)

Top scorer of Chernihiv Oblast Super Cup

- (Ukraine) Nazar Voloshyn: 2023

== Coaches ==
- (Ukraine) Valentyn Krukovets (2020)
- (Ukraine) Oleksandr Babor (2020–2022)
- (Ukraine) Serhiy Datsenko (2022–2023)
- (Ukraine) Roman Loktionov (2023–2024)
- (Ukraine) Vasyl Baranov (2024)
- (Ukraine) Roman Loktionov (2024)
- (Ukraine) Vasyl Baranov (2024–2026)
- (Ukraine) Oleksandr Protchenko (2026–present)
