= 2026–27 FC Kudrivka season =

Ukrainian football season

Kudrivka
2026–27 season
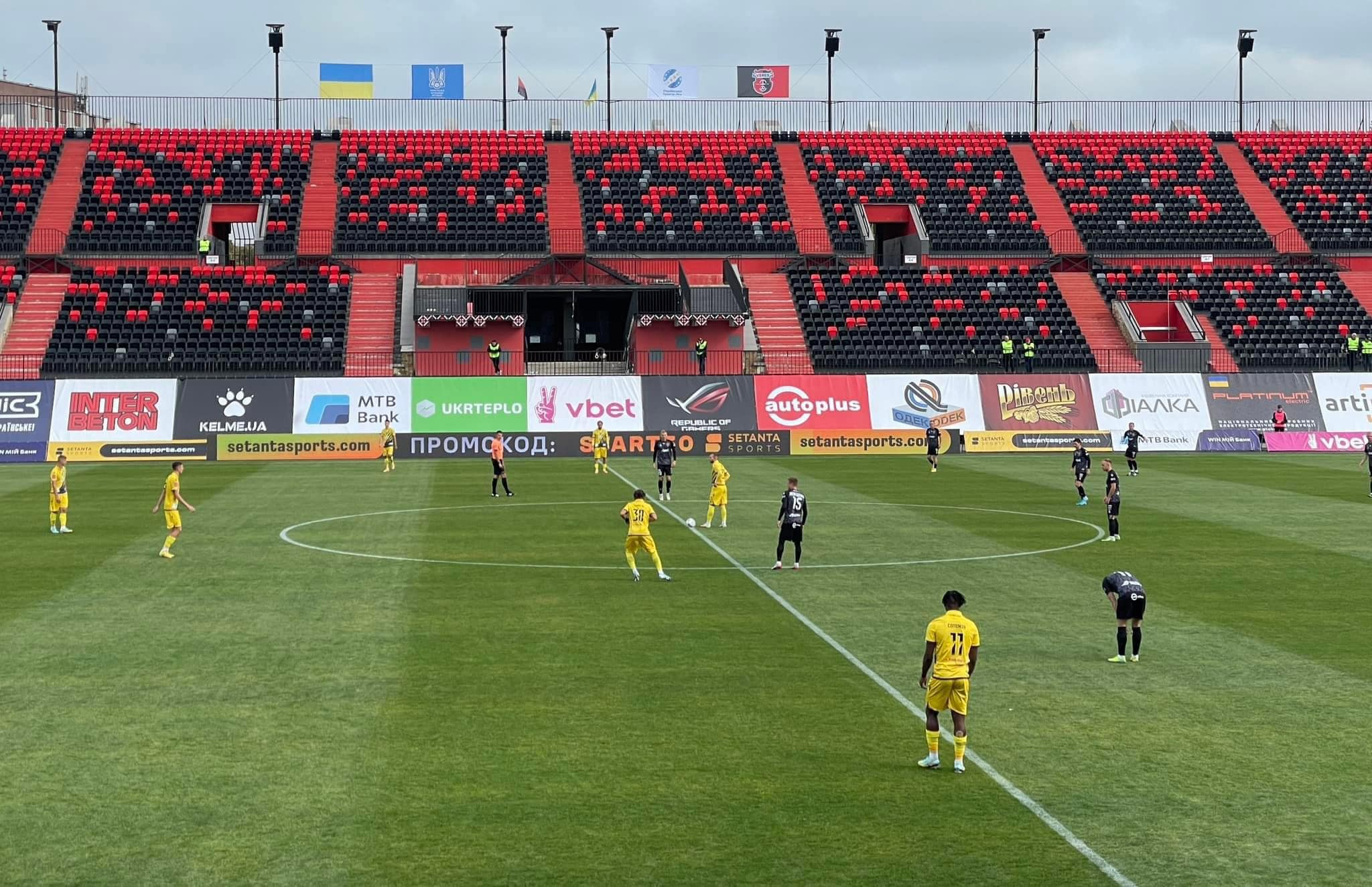
- Owner: Roman Solodarenko
- Chairman: Roman Solodarenko
- Manager: Oleksandr Protchenko
- Ukrainian Premier League: 15th
- Ukrainian Cup: TBD
- Top goalscorer: League: Yevheniy Smyrnyi (3); All: Yevheniy Smyrnyi (3)
- Highest home attendance: 4,165 (vs Shakhtar Donetsk, 3 August 2026)
- Lowest home attendance: 96 (vs Bukovyna Chernivtsi, 17 October 2026)
- Biggest win: Kudrivka 5–1 Bukovyna Chernivtsi
- Biggest defeat: Shakhtar Donetsk 5–1 Kudrivka; Polissya Zhytomyr 5–1 Kudrivka
Home colours	Away colours	Third colours
- All statistics correct as of 5 December 2025.

The 2026–27 season is the 2nd season in the Ukrainian Premier League for Kudrivka. Kudrivka will also compete in the Ukrainian Cup.

== Season summary ==
Oleksandr Protchenko was confirmed as the team's manager after leading the team to play in the Ukrainian Premier League for the second consecutive season following a play-off against Ahrobiznes Volochysk. On 24 June 2026 the club signed Yevheniy Smyrnyi. Oleksiy Husyev, Denys Nahnoynyi, Yaroslav Kysil, Maryan Faryna, Anton Hlushchenko, Oleh Pushkaryov and Raymond Owusu have returned from loan to their respective clubs. On 25 June 2026, Oleksandr Kozak and Andriy Storchous moved to Oleksandriya. Vladyslav Shapoval, Anton Demchenko and Ivan Melnychenko have returned to Kudrivka from their loans. On June 25, 2026, goalkeeper Roman Lyopka's contract expired and was not renewed. The club signs Serhiy Sten from Veres Rivne and Mykola Oharkov on loan from Shakhtar Donetsk. On 2 July 2026, Valeriy Rohozynskyi joined FC Chernihiv on loan until the end of 2026. On 12 July 2026, the striker Alban Taipi was transferred to Otrant-Olympic in Montenegrin Second League. On 16 July 2026, Artem Lyehostayev was released by the club.

== Players ==
=== Squad information ===
As of 22 August 2026

Squad no.	Name	Nationality	Position	Date of birth (age)
Goalkeepers
1	Kyrylo Lavuta	(Ukraine)	GK	31 July 2002 (aged 23)
12	Oleksandr Chobitko ^{List B}	(Ukraine)	GK	8 May 2007 (aged 18)
37	Anton Yashkov (Captain)	(Ukraine)	GK	30 January 1992 (aged 34)
73	Mykhaylo Kulyk ^{List B}	(Ukraine)	GK	29 May 2005 (aged 20)
Defenders
17	Myroslav Serdyuk	(Ukraine)	DF	27 July 1999 (aged 26)
25	Mykola Oharkov (on loan from Shakhtar Donetsk)	(Ukraine)	DF	18 February 2005 (aged 21)
50	Dmytro Semenov	(Ukraine)	DF	4 November 1999 (aged 26)
69	Yuriy Potimkov	(Ukraine)	DF	1 August 2002 (aged 23)
91	Maksym Melnychuk	(Ukraine)	DF	18 September 1999 (aged 26)
Midfielders
6	Mykola Vechurko	(Ukraine)	MF	6 June 1992 (aged 34)
7	Ivan Petryak	(Ukraine)	MF	13 March 1994 (aged 32)
8	Yevheniy Smyrnyi	(Ukraine)	MF	18 August 1998 (aged 27)
10	Rodion Plaksa	(Ukraine)	MF	22 January 2002 (aged 24)
14	Kaya Makosso	(Republic of the Congo)	MF	10 August 1998 (aged 27)
19	Artur Dumanyuk	(Ukraine)	MF	15 November 1996 (aged 29)
21	Oleksandr Byelyayev	(Ukraine)	MF	4 October 1999 (aged 25)
22	Bohdan Veklyak	(Ukraine)	MF	31 August 1999 (aged 26)
29	Victor Adeoye	(Nigeria)	MF	29 May 2006 (aged 20)
30	Vladyslav Hromskyi	(Ukraine)	MF	19 October 2005 (aged 20)
38	Matías Rosales	(Argentina)	MF	15 March 2005 (aged 21)
42	Yevhen Pasich	(Ukraine)	MF	13 July 1993 (aged 33)
45	Isiaka Saheed Abdulazeez	(Nigeria)	MF	26 February 2008 (aged 18)
55	Jair Collahuazo	(Ecuador)	MF	21 January 2006 (aged 20)
66	Kyrylo Siheyev (on loan from Shakhtar Donetsk)	(Ukraine)	MF	16 April 2004 (aged 22)
70	Demyan Yesin ^{List B}	(Ukraine)	MF	24 April 2007 (aged 19)
71	Serhiy Sten	(Ukraine)	MF	26 February 2002 (aged 24)
77	Kostyantyn Bychek	(Ukraine)	MF	21 April 2000 (aged 26)
Forwards
9	Reynaldiño Verley(on loan from Alianza)	(Panama)	FW	19 September 2002 (aged 23)
11	Roman Solodarenko	(Ukraine)	FW	26 January 1984 (aged 42)
20	Denys Svityukha	(Ukraine)	FW	8 February 2002 (aged 24)
23	Oleksandr Yushchenko (on loan from Shakhtar Donetsk)	(Ukraine)	MF	20 April 2002 (aged 23)
24	Raymond Owusu (on loan from Metalist 1925 Kharkiv)	(Ghana)	MF	20 April 2002 (aged 23)
97	Anton Demchenko ^{List B}	(Ukraine)	FW	6 January 2005 (aged 21)

== Management team ==
Position	Name	Year appointed	Last club/team
Manager	(Ukraine) Oleksandr Protchenko	2026-	Kudrivka
Goalkeeping Coach	(Ukraine) Dmytro Stoyko	2026-	Vorskla Poltava
Assistant Coach	(Ukraine) Dmytro Korkishko	2026-	Avanhard Lozova
Physical Training Coach	(Ukraine) Kishan Gautam Shil	2026-	Polissya-2 Zhytomyr

== Transfers ==
=== In ===
Date	Pos.	Player	Age	Moving from	Type	Fee	Source
Summer
24 June 2026	MF	(Ukraine) Yevheniy Smyrnyi	27	Unattached	Transfer	Free	
26 June 2026	DF	(Ukraine) Vladyslav Shapoval	31	(Ukraine) Chernihiv	Loan Return	Free	
27 June 2026	FW	(Ukraine) Anton Demchenko	21	(Ukraine) Podillya Khmelnytskyi	Loan Return	Free	
27 June 2026	MF	(Ukraine) Ivan Melnychenko	24	(Ukraine) Lokomotyv Kyiv	Loan Return	Free	
29 June 2026	MF	(Ukraine) Serhiy Sten	24	(Ukraine) Veres Rivne	Transfer	Free	
30 June 2026	DF	(Ukraine) Mykola Oharkov	21	(Ukraine) Shakhtar Donetsk	Loan	Free	
6 July 2026	GK	(Ukraine) Kyrylo Lavuta	23	(Ukraine) Vorskla Poltava	Transfer	Free	
8 July 2026	FW	(Panama) Reynaldiño Verley	23	(Panama) Alianza	Loan	Free	
13 July 2026	MF	(Ukraine) Yevhen Pasich	33	(Ukraine) Kharkiv	Transfer	Free	
14 July 2026	MF	(Ukraine) Rodion Plaksa	24	Unattached	Transfer	Free	
15 July 2026	GK	(Ukraine) Oleksandr Chobitko	19	(Ukraine) Oleksandriya U19	Transfer	Free	
18 July 2026	DF	(Ukraine) Dmytro Semenov	24	(Ukraine) Obolon Kyiv	Transfer	Free	
25 July 2026	MF	(Ukraine) Ivan Petryak	32	(Ukraine) Shakhtar Donetsk	Transfer	Free	
2 August 2026	MF	(Ukraine) Kyrylo Siheyev	22	(Ukraine) Shakhtar Donetsk	Loan	Free	
2 August 2026	MF	(Ukraine) Oleksandr Yushchenko	21	(Ukraine) Shakhtar Donetsk	Loan	Free	
2 August 2026	MF	(Ukraine) Mykola Vechurko	34	(Ukraine) Chaika	Transfer	Free	
2 August 2026	MF	(Ukraine) Kostyantyn Bychek	26	(Ukraine) Obolon Kyiv	Transfer	Free	
2 August 2026	MF	(Ukraine) Demyan Yesin	19	(Italy) Calvi	Transfer	Free	
13 August 2026	MF	(Argentina) Matías Rosales	21	(Argentina) Sarmiento	Transfer	Free	
14 August 2026	MF	(Nigeria) Isiaka Sahid Abdulaziz	18	Unattached	Transfer	Free	

=== Out ===
Date	Pos.	Player	Age	Moving from	Type	Fee	Source
Summer
25 June 2026	MF	(Ukraine) Oleksandr Kozak	31	(Ukraine) Oleksandriya	Transfer	Free	
25 June 2026	MF	(Ukraine) Andriy Storchous	31	(Ukraine) Oleksandriya	Transfer	Free	
26 June 2026	GK	(Ukraine) Roman Lyopka	28	Unattached	Transfer	Free	
30 June 2026	DF	(Ukraine) Oleksiy Husyev	23	(Ukraine) Dynamo Kyiv	Loan Return	Free	
30 June 2026	DF	(Ukraine) Denys Nahnoynyi	23	(Ukraine) FC Kharkiv	Loan Return	Free	
30 June 2026	DF	(Ukraine) Yaroslav Kysil	22	(Ukraine) LNZ Cherkasy	Loan Return	Free	
30 June 2026	DF	(Ukraine) Maryan Faryna	22	(Ukraine) Shakhtar Donetsk	Loan Return	Free	
30 June 2026	MF	(Ukraine) Anton Hlushchenko	22	(Ukraine) Shakhtar Donetsk	Loan Return	Free	
30 June 2026	MF	(Ukraine) Oleh Pushkaryov	21	(Ukraine) Shakhtar Donetsk	Loan Return	Free	
30 June 2026	FW	(Ghana) Raymond Owusu	24	(Ukraine) FC Kharkiv	Loan Return	Free	
30 June 2026	DF	(Ukraine) Vladyslav Shapoval	31	Unattached	Released	Free	
2 July 2026	MF	(Ukraine) Valeriy Rohozynskyi	30	(Ukraine) Chernihiv	Loan	Free	
12 July 2026	FW	(North Macedonia) Alban Taipi	23	(Montenegro) Otrant-Olympic	Transfer	Free	
16 July 2026	FW	(Ukraine) Artem Lyehostayev	23	(Ukraine) Viktoriya Sumy	Transfer	Free	
23 July 2026	MF	(Ukraine) Ivan Melnychenko	22	(Ukraine) Kolos-2 Kovalivka	Transfer	Free	
26 July 2026	MF	(Ukraine) Yevheniy Morozko	33	Unattached	Transfer	Free	
28 July 2026	MF	(Ukraine) Artem Machelyuk	26	(Ukraine) Zorya Luhansk	Transfer	Free	
28 July 2026	GK	(Ukraine) Illya Karavashchenko	25	(Ukraine) Zorya Luhansk	Transfer	Free	
19 August 2026	MF	(Ecuador) Jair Collahuazo	20	(Saudi Arabia) Taawoun	Loan	Free	

== Pre-season and friendlies ==
Win Draw Loss

10 July 2025 Friendly	Kudrivka (Ukraine)	2–1	(Ukraine) Rebel Kyiv	Stryi
EET (UTC+02:00)		Report		Stadium: Sokil Stadium

11 July 2025 Friendly	Livyi Bereh Kyiv (Ukraine)	4–0	(Ukraine) Kudrivka
EET (UTC+02:00)	Shastal 9'; Voloshyn 18'; Wendell 54'	Report

15 July 2025 Friendly	Kolos-2 Kovalivka (Ukraine)	0–2	(Ukraine) Kudrivka
EET (UTC+02:00)

17 July 2025 Friendly	Kolos Kovalivka (Ukraine)	2–0	(Ukraine) Kudrivka
EET (UTC+02:00)	Demchenko 15'; Demchenko 49'	Report

24 July 2025 Friendly	Obolon Kyiv (Ukraine)	0–1	(Ukraine) Kudrivka
EET (UTC+02:00)		Report

26 September 2026 Friendly	Obolon Kyiv (Ukraine)	2–0	(Ukraine) Kudrivka
EET (UTC+02:00)		Report

== Competitions ==
=== Overall record ===
Competition	First match	Last match	Starting round	Record							
Competition	First match	Last match	Starting round	Pld	W	D	L	GF	GA	GD	Win %
Premier League	3 August 2026	2027	Matchday 1	12	2	2	8	12	29	−17	16.67
Ukrainian Cup	21 August 2026		Round of 32	2	1	0	1	6	3	+3	50.00
Total				14	3	2	9	18	32	−14	21.43

Last updated: 7 November 2026
Source: Results

=== Premier League ===
==== League table ====
Pos	Team	Pld	W	D	L	GF	GA	GD	Pts	Qualification or relegation
12	Chornomorets Odesa	11	2	3	6	8	13	−5	9 (Note: Ranked on head-to-head points: Chornomorets Odesa 3, Veres Rivne 0)	
13	Veres Rivne	12	2	3	7	7	18	−11	9	Qualification for the Relegation play-off
14	Obolon Kyiv	11	1	5	5	5	18	−13	8	Qualification for the Relegation play-off
15	Kudrivka	12	2	2	8	12	29	−17	8	Relegation to Ukrainian First League
16	Kryvbas Kryvyi Rih	10	1	4	5	8	16	−8	7	Relegation to Ukrainian First League

Updated to match(es) played on 21 November 2026. Source: upl.ua
Rules for classification: 1) Points; 2) Head-to-head points; 3) Head-to-head goal difference; 4) Head-to-head goals scored; 5) Goal difference; 6) Goals scored; 7) Draw or "Golden match" if two teams are tied for title (Article 22, paragraph 3).
Notes:

Premier League teams	Agg.	First League teams	1st leg	2nd leg
	x–x			
	x–x			

=== First Semi-final ===
v

v

=== Second Semi-final ===
v

v

==== Results summary ====
Overall								Home						Away					
Pld	W	D	L	GF	GA	GD	Pts	W	D	L	GF	GA	GD	W	D	L	GF	GA	GD
11	2	2	7	9	26	−17	8	2	1	1	4	4	0	0	1	6	5	22	−17

Last updated: 7 November 2026.
Source: Results

==== Results by round ====
Round	1	2	3	4	5	6	7	8	9	10	11	12	13
Ground	A	A	H	H	A		H	A	A	H	A	A	H
Result	L	D	D	L	L		L	L	L	W	L	L	W
Position	11	8	9	12	15		16	16	16	14	16	16	14

Updated to match(es) played on 7 November 2026. Source: Results
A = Away; H = Home; W = Win; D = Draw; L = Loss

==== Results ====
3 August 2026 1	Shakhtar Donetsk	5–1	Kudrivka	Lviv
18:00 EEST (UTC+3)	Alisson 32'; Elias 55', 72', 90+2'; Mendoza (yellow card) 64'; Meirelles 81'	Report	Dumanyuk 42' (yellow card) 54'; Bychek (yellow card) 75'	Stadium: Arena Lviv; Attendance: 4,165; Referee: Dmytro Panchyshyn

8 August 2026 2	Livyi Bereh Kyiv	0–0	FC Kudrivka	Kyiv Oblast
15:30 EEST (UTC+03:00)		Report		Stadium: Arena Livyi Bereh; Attendance: 824

15 August 2026 3	FC Kudrivka	0–0	Obolon Kyiv	Rivne
15:30 EEST (UTC+03:00)		Report		Stadium: Avanhard Stadium; Attendance: 251

29 August 2026 4	FC Kudrivka	0–3	Epitsentr	Rivne
15:30 EEST (UTC+03:00)		Report		Stadium: Avanhard Stadium; Attendance: 238

4 September 2026 5	Polissya Zhytomyr	5–1	Kudrivka	Zhytomyr
EEST (UTC+3)		Report		Stadium: Tsentralnyi Stadion; Attendance: 2884

12 September 2026 6	Veres Rivne	Postponed	Kudrivka	Rivne
EEST (UTC+3)				Stadium: Avanhard Stadium

20 September 2026 7	FC Kudrivka	2–3	Kolos Kovalivka	Rivne
15:30 EEST (UTC+03:00)		Report		Stadium: Avanhard Stadium; Attendance: 176

12 September 2026 8	Veres Rivne	2–1	Kudrivka	Rivne
EEST (UTC+3)		Report		Stadium: Avanhard Stadium; Attendance: 1250

11 October 2026 9	LNZ Cherkasy	2–1	Kudrivka	Cherkasy
EEST (UTC+3)		Report		Stadium: Cherkasy Arena; Attendance: 700

17 October 2026 10	FC Kudrivka	4–1	Bukovyna Chernivtsi	Rivne
15:30 EEST (UTC+03:00)		Report		Stadium: Avanhard Stadium; Attendance: 96

23 October 2026 10	Dynamo Kyiv	3–1	Kudrivka	Kyiv
EEST (UTC+3)	Veklyak 28' (o.g.); Mykhaylenko 46'; Mykhavko (yellow card) 59'; Pikhalyonok 79'	Report	Dumanyuk (yellow card) 60'; Byelyayev (yellow card) 62'; Mykhavko 67' (o.g.); Plaksa (yellow card) 89'	Stadium: Valeriy Lobanovskyi Stadium; Attendance: 412; Referee: Mykhailo Raida

2 November 2026 11	Karpaty Lviv	5–0	Kudrivka	Lviv
18:00 EET (UTC+02:00)		Report		Stadium: Ukraina Stadium

7 November 2026 12	FC Kudrivka	1–0	Chornomorets Odesa	Rivne
15:30 EEST (UTC+03:00)		Report		Stadium: Avanhard Stadium; Attendance: 63

21 November 2026 13	Kryvbas Kryvyi Rih	Postponed	FC Kudrivka	Kryvyi Rih
15:30 EEST (UTC+03:00)		Report		Stadium: Hirnyk Stadium

=== Ukrainian Cup ===
22 August 2026 Round of 64 (1/32)	Avanhard Lozova	1-6	Kudrivka	Yuriivka
EEST (UTC+3)	Zhychykov (yellow card) 63' Hladkyi 31'	Report	Byelyayev 3', 42' (pen.); Selin 17' (o.g.); Cherevatenko 56' (o.g.); Yesin 71'; Oharkov 80'	Stadium: DYuSSh; Referee: Yehven Tsybulko (Cherkasy Oblast)

8-10 October 2026 Round of 32 (1/16)	Polissya Zhytomyr	2–0	Kudrivka	Zhytomyr
EEST (UTC+3)	Haiduchyk 69'; Andrade 79'	Report		Stadium: Tsentralnyi; Referee: Oleksandr Shandor (Lviv)

== Statistics ==
=== Appearances and goals ===
No.	Pos	Nat	Player	Total		Ukrainian Premier League		Ukrainian Cup		Play-offs	
No.	Pos	Nat	Player	Apps	Goals	Apps	Goals	Apps	Goals	Apps	Goals
Goalkeepers
1	GK	(Ukraine) UKR	Kyrylo Lavuta	3	0	1	0	2	0	0	0
12	GK	(Ukraine) UKR	Oleksandr Chobitko	0	0	0	0	0	0	0	0
38	GK	(Ukraine) UKR	Anton Yashkov	11	0	11	0	0	0	0	0
73	GK	(Ukraine) UKR	Mykhaylo Kulyk	0	0	0	0	0	0	0	0
Defenders
17	DF	(Ukraine) UKR	Myroslav Serdyuk	10	0	8	0	2	0	0	0
25	DF	(Ukraine) UKR	Mykola Oharkov	8	1	6	0	2	1	0	0
50	DF	(Ukraine) UKR	Dmytro Semenov	8	0	8	0	0	0	0	0
69	DF	(Ukraine) UKR	Yuriy Potimkov	6	0	4	0	2	0	0	0
91	DF	(Ukraine) UKR	Maksym Melnychuk	8	0	7	0	1	0	0	0
Midfielders
6	MF	(Ukraine) UKR	Mykola Vechurko	7	0	5	0	2	0	0	0
7	MF	(Ukraine) UKR	Ivan Petryak	10	1	8	1	2	0	0	0
8	MF	(Ukraine) UKR	Yevheniy Smyrnyi	13	3	12	3	1	0	0	0
10	MF	(Ukraine) UKR	Rodion Plaksa	9	0	7	0	2	0	0	0
14	MF	(Republic of the Congo) CGO	Kaya Makosso	9	1	8	1	1	0	0	0
19	MF	(Ukraine) UKR	Artur Dumanyuk	13	2	11	2	2	0	0	0
21	MF	(Ukraine) UKR	Oleksandr Byelyayev	14	2	12	0	2	2	0	0
22	MF	(Ukraine) UKR	Bohdan Veklyak	11	0	11	0	0	0	0	0
29	MF	(Nigeria) NGR	Victor Adeoye	4	0	2	0	2	0	0	0
30	MF	(Ukraine) UKR	Vladyslav Hromskyi	1	0	0	0	1	0	0	0
38	MF	(Argentina) ARG	Matías Rosales	4	0	3	0	1	0	0	0
42	MF	(Ukraine) UKR	Yevhen Pasich	11	0	11	0	0	0	0	0
45	MF	(Nigeria) NGR	Isiak Sahid Abdulaziz	0	0	0	0	0	0	0	0
66	MF	(Ukraine) UKR	Kyrylo Siheyev	7	0	5	0	2	0	0	0
70	MF	(Ukraine) UKR	Demyan Yesin	3	1	2	0	1	1	0	0
71	MF	(Ukraine) UKR	Serhiy Sten	5	0	4	0	1	0	0	0
77	MF	(Ukraine) UKR	Kostyantyn Bychek	7	0	7	0	0	0	0	0
Forwards
9	FW	(Panama) PAN	Reynaldiño Verley	11	2	10	1	1	1	0	0
11	FW	(Ukraine) UKR	Roman Solodarenko	0	0	0	0	0	0	0	0
20	FW	(Ukraine) UKR	Denys Svityukha	13	2	11	2	2	0	0	0
23	FW	(Ukraine) UKR	Oleksandr Yushchenko	5	0	5	0	0	0	0	0
24	FW	(Ghana) GHA	Raymond Owusu	13	2	12	2	1	0	0	0
97	FW	(Ukraine) UKR	Anton Demchenko	0	0	0	0	0	0	0	0
Players transferred out during the season
55	MF	(Ecuador) ECU	Jair Collahuazo	0	0	0	0	0	0	0	0

Source: Competitions

Last updated: 7 November 2026

=== Goalscorers ===
Rank	No.	Pos	Nat	Name	Premier League	Ukrainian Cup	Play-offs	Total
1	8	MF	(Ukraine)	Yevheniy Smyrnyi	3	0	0	3
2	19	MF	(Ukraine)	Artur Dumanyuk	2	0	0	2
3	20	FW	(Ukraine)	Denys Svityukha	2	0	0	2
4	24	FW	(Ghana)	Raymond Owusu	2	0	0	2
5	21	MF	(Ukraine)	Oleksandr Byelyayev	0	2	0	2
6	9	FW	(Panama)	Reynaldiño Verley	1	1	0	2
7	7	MF	(Ukraine)	Ivan Petryak	1	0	0	1
9	14	MF	(Republic of the Congo)	Kaya Makosso	1	0	0	1
10	25	DF	(Ukraine)	Mykola Oharkov	0	1	0	1
				Total	12	4	0	16

Last updated: 7 November 2026

=== Clean sheets ===
Rank	No.	Pos	Nat	Name	Ukrainian Premier League	Ukrainian Cup	Play-offs	Total
1	37	GK	(Ukraine)	Anton Yashkov	2	0	0	2
2	1	GK	(Ukraine)	Kyrylo Lavuta	1	0	0	1
				Total	3	0	0	3

Last updatedː 7 November 2026

=== Disciplinary record ===
No.	Pos	Nat	Player	Premier League			Ukrainian Cup			Europa League			Total		
No.	Pos	Nat	Player	Yellow card	(yellow card) (yellow-red card)	Red card	Yellow card	(yellow card) (yellow-red card)	Red card	Yellow card	(yellow card) (yellow-red card)	Red card	Yellow card	(yellow card) (yellow-red card)	Red card
19	MF	(Ukraine)	Artur Dumanyuk	4	1	0	0	0	0	0	0	0	4	1	0
50	DF	(Ukraine)	Dmytro Semenov	4	0	0	0	0	0	0	0	0	4	0	0
25	DF	(Ukraine)	Mykola Oharkov	3	0	0	1	0	0	0	0	0	4	0	0
22	MF	(Ukraine)	Bohdan Veklyak	3	0	1	0	0	0	0	0	0	3	0	1
7	MF	(Ukraine)	Ivan Petryak	2	0	0	0	0	0	0	0	0	2	0	0
8	MF	(Ukraine)	Yevheniy Smyrnyi	2	0	0	0	0	0	0	0	0	2	0	0
10	MF	(Ukraine)	Rodion Plaksa	2	0	0	0	0	0	0	0	0	2	0	0
21	MF	(Ukraine)	Oleksandr Byelyayev	2	0	0	0	0	0	0	0	0	2	0	0
77	MF	(Ukraine)	Kostyantyn Bychek	1	0	0	0	0	0	0	0	0	1	0	0
42	MF	(Ukraine)	Yevhen Pasich	1	0	0	0	0	0	0	0	0	1	0	0
38	MF	(Argentina)	Matías Rosales	1	0	0	0	0	0	0	0	0	1	0	0
69	DF	(Ukraine)	Yuriy Potimkov	1	0	0	0	0	0	0	0	0	1	0	0
24	FW	(Ghana)	Raymond Owusu	1	0	0	0	0	0	0	0	0	1	0	0
23	FW	(Ukraine)	Oleksandr Yushchenko	1	0	0	0	0	0	0	0	0	1	0	0
6	MF	(Ukraine)	Mykola Vechurko	1	0	0	0	0	0	0	0	0	1	0	0
17	DF	(Ukraine)	Myroslav Serdyuk	1	0	0	0	0	0	0	0	0	1	0	0
29	FW	(Ukraine)	Denys Svityukha	1	0	0	0	0	0	0	0	0	1	0	0
91	DF	(Ukraine)	Maksym Melnychuk	1	0	0	0	0	0	0	0	0	1	0	0
			Total	11	1	1	1	0	0	0	0	0	12	1	1

Last updated: 7 November 2026
