= 2025–26 FC Kudrivka season =

Football club season

Kudrivka
2025–26 season
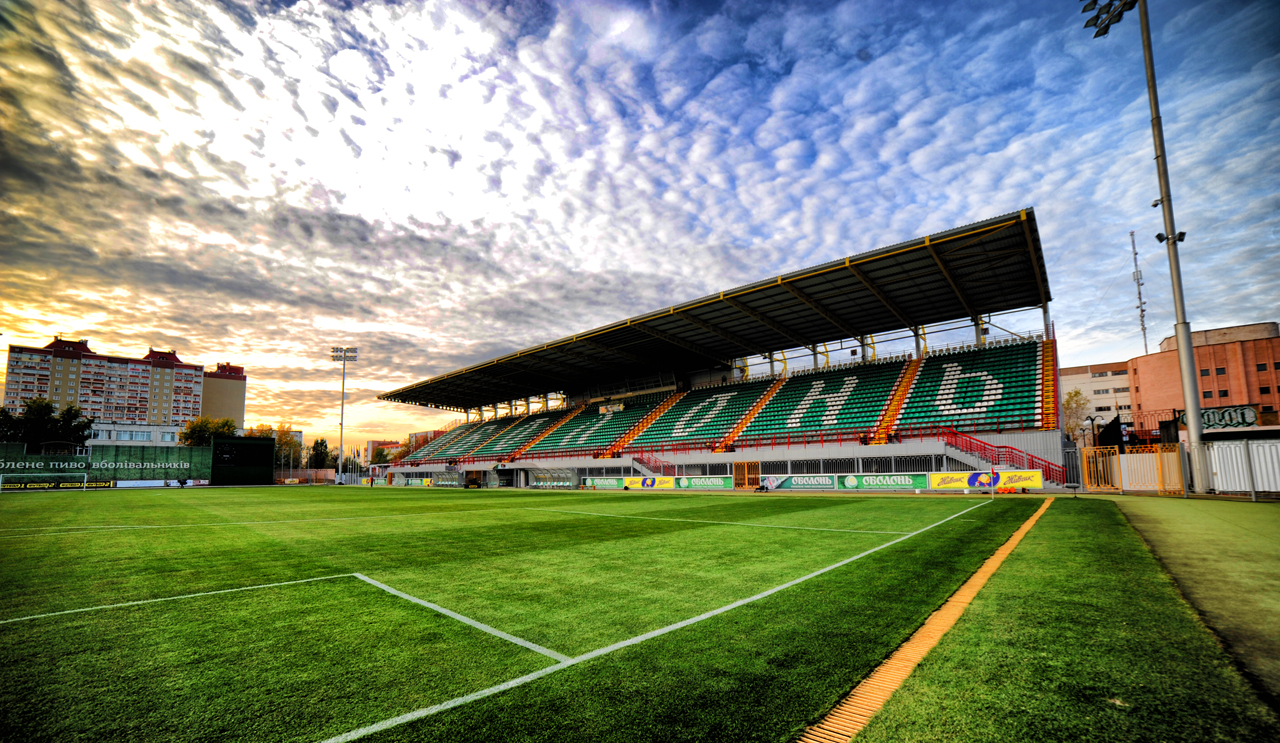
- Obolon Arena is the home stadium for the season
- Owner: Roman Solodarenko
- Chairman: Roman Solodarenko
- Manager: Vasyl Baranov (until 4 May 2026); Oleksandr Protchenko (From 5 May 2026)
- Stadium: Avanhard Stadium Since 2026; Obolon Arena From September 2025 until December 2025
- Ukrainian Premier League: 13th
- Ukrainian Cup: Round of 64 (1/32)
- Top goalscorer: League: Andriy Storchous (12); All: Andriy Storchous (12)
- Highest home attendance: 2500
- Lowest home attendance: 48
- Biggest win: Kudrivka 3–1 Oleksandriya; Kudrivka 3–1 Obolon Kyiv
- Biggest defeat: Shakhtar Donetsk 4–0 Kudrivka
Home colours	Away colours	Third colours
- All statistics correct as of 5 December 2025.

The 2025–26 season is the 1st season in the Ukrainian Premier League for Kudrivka. Kudrivka will also compete in the Ukrainian Cup.

== Season summary ==
Initially the club opted to use the stadium Slavutych-Arena in Zaporizhzhia for their home matches in the Ukrainian Premier League. At the end it chose the Obolon Arena. On 25 June Mykyta Teplyakov left the club after his contract expired. The club has announced the list of sparring partners with which it will prepare for its debut in Ukrainian Premier League. The club's president, Roman Solodarenko, admitted that he intends to be part of the starting lineup of his team during the season. On 23 July 2025 the club extended the contract of Roman Hahun. In July 2025 FC Kudrivka announced the signing of Oleksiy Husiev on loan from Dynamo Kyiv. On 13 September 2025, Oleksiy Husiev was called up by the Ukraine under-20 team for the 2025 FIFA U-20 World Cup. In October 2025 also Ivan Losenko was called up by the Ukraine under-21 team for the Qualitication. At the end of October, Denys Bezborodko was suspended from the first team and sent to the reserve team. During the winter transfers, the club released Kyrylo Matvyeyev. In February 2026 the club announced that will play its home games in Avanhard Stadium. On 4 May 2026 Vasyl Baranov was sacked as coach of the club and replaced by Oleksandr Protchenko.

With the new coach, the team earned 6 points, losing against Kolos Kovalivka and winning against Rukh Lviv and LNZ Cherkasy, managing to play for the possibility of the play-offs on the last day against Dynamo Kyiv on the last day.

On May 21, 2026, Jair Collahuazo left the team's training camp without permission and has already left Ukraine, reportedly due to the club's salary arrears, which exceeded two months.

== Players ==
=== Squad information ===
As of 9 April 2026

Squad no.	Name	Nationality	Position	Date of birth (age)
Goalkeepers
1	Roman Lyopka	(Ukraine)	GK	21 February 1997 (aged 27)
37	Anton Yashkov (Captain)	(Ukraine)	GK	30 January 1992 (aged 33)
44	Illya Karavashchenko	(Ukraine)	GK	25 June 2001 (aged 23)
73	Mykhaylo Kulyk	(Ukraine)	GK	29 May 2005 (aged 19)
Defenders
3	Yaroslav Kysil (on loan from LNZ Cherkasy)	(Ukraine)	DF	31 May 2003 (aged 22)
13	Vladyslav Shapoval	(Ukraine)	DF	8 May 1995 (aged 30)
17	Myroslav Serdyuk	(Ukraine)	DF	27 July 1999 (aged 25)
29	Denys Nahnoynyi(on loan from Metalist 1925 Kharkiv)	(Ukraine)	DF	3 February 2002 (aged 23)
39	Artem Machelyuk	(Ukraine)	DF	14 October 1999 (aged 25)
69	Yuriy Potimkov	(Ukraine)	DF	1 August 2002 (aged 22)
74	Maryan Faryna (on loan from Shakhtar Donetsk)	(Ukraine)	DF	28 August 2003 (aged 22)
90	Ivan Mamrosenko	(Ukraine)	DF	27 March 2000 (aged 25)
91	Maksym Melnychuk	(Ukraine)	DF	18 September 1999 (aged 25)
Midfielders
5	Andriy Totovytskyi	(Ukraine)	MF	20 January 1993 (aged 32)
6	Mykola Vechurko	(Ukraine)	MF	1 October 1998 (aged 26)
7	Oleksandr Byelyayev	(Ukraine)	MF	4 October 1999 (aged 25)
8	Andriy Storchous	(Ukraine)	MF	30 June 1994 (aged 31)
10	Oleksandr Kozak	(Ukraine)	MF	25 July 1994 (aged 30)
14	Kaya Makosso	(Republic of the Congo)	MF	10 August 1998 (aged 26)
14	Kyrylo Matvyeyev	(Ukraine)	MF	5 April 2002 (aged 23)
19	Artur Dumanyuk	(Ukraine)	MF	15 November 1996 (aged 28)
21	Anton Hlushchenko (on loan from Shakhtar Donetsk)	(Ukraine)	MF	20 April 2004 (aged 21)
22	Bohdan Veklyak	(Ukraine)	MF	31 August 1999 (aged 25)
23	Victor Adeoye	(Nigeria)	MF	29 May 2006 (aged 19)
27	Oleh Pushkaryov (on loan from Shakhtar Donetsk)	(Ukraine)	MF	11 June 2004 (aged 21)
29	Denys Nahnoynyi (on loan from Metalist 1925 Kharkiv)	(Ukraine)	MF	3 February 2002 (aged 23)
30	Oleksiy Husiev (on loan from Dynamo Kyiv)	(Ukraine)	MF	16 March 2005 (aged 20)
33	Yevheniy Morozko	(Ukraine)	MF	15 February 1993 (aged 32)
55	Jair Collahuazo	(Ecuador)	MF	21 January 2006 (aged 19)
66	Ivan Losenko (on loan from Shakhtar Donetsk)	(Ukraine)	MF	24 July 2004 (aged 20)
78	Valeriy Rohozynskyi	(Ukraine)	MF	3 September 1995 (aged 29)
97	Anton Demchenko	(Ukraine)	MF	6 January 2005 (aged 20)
Forwards
7	Dmytro Korkishko	(Ukraine)	FW	4 March 1995 (aged 30)
9	Alban Taipi	(North Macedonia)	FW	21 June 2003 (aged 22)
10	Oleksiy Lytovchenko	(Ukraine)	FW	15 August 1996 (aged 28)
11	Roman Solodarenko	(Ukraine)	FW	26 January 1984 (aged 41)
20	Denys Svityukha	(Ukraine)	FW	8 February 2002 (aged 23)
21	Denys Bezborodko^{List B}	(Ukraine)	FW	31 May 1994 (aged 31)
23	Maksym Andrushchenko	(Ukraine)	FW	5 April 1999 (aged 26)
24	Raymond Owusu (on loan from Metalist 1925 Kharkiv)	(Ghana)	MF	20 April 2002 (aged 23)
77	Artem Lyehostayev	(Ukraine)	FW	11 August 2002 (aged 22)

== Management team ==
Position	Name	Year appointed	Last club/team
Manager	(Ukraine) Oleksandr Protchenko	2026-	Kudrivka U19
Manager	(Ukraine) Vasyl Baranov	2024-2026	Vorskla Poltava
Vice-Manager	(Ukraine) Vitaliy Kostyshyn	2025-2026	Podillya Khmelnytskyi
Goalkeeping Coach	(Ukraine) Dmytro Ivanov	2026-	Kudrivka U19
Goalkeeping Coach	(Ukraine) Ihor Shukhovtsev	2025-2026	Mariupol
Assistant Coach	(Ukraine) Yevhen Zadorozhny	2025-	
Assistant Coach	(Ukraine) Anton Dyachenko	2026-	
Assistant Coach	(Ukraine) Yuri Zamaraev	2026-	
Assistant Coach	(Ukraine) Serhiy Taran	2025-2026	
Physical Training Coach	(Ukraine) Dmytro Kornienko	2025-	
Physical Athletic trainer	(Ukraine) Oleksandr Dolgopyatov	2026-	

== Transfers ==
=== In ===
Date	Pos.	Player	Age	Moving from	Type	Fee	Source
Summer
6 June 2024	MF	(Ukraine) Oleksandr Nikolyshyn	24	(Ukraine) Lokomotyv Kyiv	Loan return	Free	
30 June 2024	DF	(Ukraine) Vladyslav Shapoval	30	Unattached	Transfer	Free	
22 July 2025	DF	(Ukraine) Yuriy Potimkov	33	(Ukraine) Metalist 1925 Kharkiv	Transfer	Free	
28 July 2025	MF	(Ukraine) Yevheniy Morozko	32	Unattached	Transfer	Free	
29 July 2025	FW	(Ukraine) Denys Bezborodko	31	Unattached	Transfer	Free	
30 July 2025	GK	(Ukraine) Illya Karavashchenko	24	Unattached	Transfer	Free	
30 July 2025	MF	(Ukraine) Bohdan Veklyak	25	Unattached	Transfer	Free	
31 July 2025	DF	(Ukraine) Denys Nahnoynyi	23	(Ukraine) Metalist 1925 Kharkiv	On Loan	Free	
1 August 2025	MF	(Ukraine) Andriy Totovytskyi	32	Unattached	Transfer	Free	
2 August 2025	MF	(Ukraine) Ivan Losenko	21	(Ukraine) Shakhtar Donetsk	On Loan	Free	
2 August 2025	MF	(Ukraine) Oleh Pushkaryov	21	(Ukraine) Shakhtar Donetsk	On Loan	Free	
12 August 2025	MF	(Ukraine) Oleksiy Husiev	20	(Ukraine) Dynamo Kyiv	Loan	Free	
30 July 2025	GK	(Ukraine) Mykhaylo Kulyk	19	(Ukraine) Veres Rivne	Transfer	Free	
21 August 2025	MF	(Ukraine) Anton Demchenko	19	(Ukraine) Mynai	Transfer	Free	
6 September 2025	FW	(Ghana) Raymond Owusu	23	(Ukraine) Metalist 1925 Kharkiv	Loan	Free	
Winter
1 January 2026	GK	(Ukraine) Illya Karavashchenko	24	(Ukraine) Lisne	Loan Return	Free	
9 January 2026	DF	(Ukraine) Yaroslav Kysil	22	(Ukraine) LNZ Cherkasy	Loan	Free	
9 January 2026	MF	(Ukraine) Oleksandr Byelyayev	26	Unattached	Transfer	Free	
29 January 2026	MF	(Ukraine) Mykola Vechurko	33	(Ukraine) SC Chaika	Loan Return	Free	
30 January 2026	MF	(Ukraine) Danylo Tuzenko	22	(Ukraine) Metalurh Zaporizhzhia	Loan Return	Free	
7 February 2026	MF	(Republic of the Congo) Kaya Makosso	27	Unattached	Transfer	Free	
11 February 2026	MF	(Ukraine) Anton Hlushchenko	21	(Ukraine) Shakhtar Donetsk	Loan	Free	
12 February 2026	MF	(North Macedonia) Alban Taipi	22	(North Macedonia) Arsimi	Transfer	Free	
19 February 2026	MF	(Ukraine) Maryan Faryna	22	(Ukraine) Shakhtar Donetsk	Loan	Free	
11 March 2026	MF	(Nigeria) Victor Adeoye	19	(Nigeria) Kwara United	Transfer	Free	
11 March 2026	MF	(Ecuador) Jair Collahuazo	19	(Ecuador) Club Sport Emelec	Transfer	Free	

=== Out ===
Date	Pos.	Player	Age	Moving from	Type	Fee	Source
Summer
9 May 2025	GK	(Ukraine) Denys Zaychenko	19	(Ukraine) Nyva Vinnytsia	Transfer	Free	
2 June 2025	DF	(Ukraine) Yuriy Potimkov	33	(Ukraine) Metalist 1925 Kharkiv	Loan Return	Free	
2 June 2025	FW	(Ukraine) Illya Zubkov	20	Unattached	Released	Free	
25 June 2025	DF	(Ukraine) Mykyta Teplyakov	24	Unattached	Released	Free	
22 July 2025	DF	(Ukraine) Danylo Tuzenko	21	(Ukraine) Feniks-Mariupol	Loan	Free	
22 July 2025	FW	(Ukraine) Oleksandr Yevtushenko	22	Unattached	Released	Free	
3 August 2025	MF	(Ukraine) Mykhaylo Shershen	30	(Ukraine) Vorskla Poltava	Released	Free	
7 August 2025	DF	(Ukraine) Oleksandr Nikolyshyn	24	(Ukraine) Podillya	Transfer	Free	
7 August 2025	FW	(Ukraine) Maksym Andrushchenko	26	(Ukraine) Vorskla Poltava	Transfer	Free	
14 August 2025	GK	(Ukraine) Illya Karavashchenko	24	(Ukraine) Lisne	Loan	Free	
18 August 2025	DF	(Ukraine) Roman Hahun	24	(Ukraine) Feniks-Mariupol	Transfer	Free	
6 September 2025	MF	(Ukraine) Ivan Melnychenko	24	(Ukraine) Lokomotyv Kyiv	Loan	Free	
7 September 2025	MF	(Ukraine) Mykola Vechurko	33	(Ukraine) Chaika	Loan	Free	
Winter
21 December 2025	MF	(Ukraine) Kyrylo Matvyeyev	23	Unattached	End Contract	Free	
24 December 2025	FW	(Ukraine) Oleksiy Lytovchenko	29	Unattached	End Contract	Free	
30 December 2025	MF	(Ukraine) Ivan Losenko	21	(Ukraine) Shakhtar Donetsk	Loan Return	Free	
30 January 2026	MF	(Ukraine) Mykola Vechurko	33	(Ukraine) SC Chaika	Transfer	Free	
8 February 2026	MF	(Ukraine) Dmytro Korkishko	35	Unattached	Transfer	Free	
10 February 2026	MF	(Ukraine) Andriy Totovytskyi	32	Unattached	End Contract	Free	
21 February 2026	MF	(Ukraine) Anton Demchenko	21	(Ukraine) Podillya Khmelnytskyi	Loan	Free	
27 February 2026	MF	(Ukraine) Danylo Tuzenko	22	(Ukraine) Inhulets Petrove	Transfer	Free	
7 March 2026	FW	(Ukraine) Denys Bezborodko	31	(Ukraine) Chernihiv	Transfer	Free	
11 March 2026	DF	(Ukraine) Vladyslav Shapoval	30	(Ukraine) Chernihiv	Loan	Free	
17 March 2026	DF	(Ukraine) Ivan Mamrosenko	25	Unattached	End Contract	Free	

== Pre-season and friendlies ==
Win Draw Loss

28 June 2025 Friendly	Poltava (Ukraine)	2–1	(Ukraine) Kudrivka	Boryspil
EET (UTC+02:00)	Halenkov 21'; Odaryuk 35'	Report	Shershen 72'	Stadium: Kolos Stadium

4 July 2025 Friendly	Kudrivka (Ukraine)	3–1	(Ukraine) Shakhtar Donetsk U19	Bucha
EET (UTC+02:00)				Stadium: Stadium Yuvileinyi

8 July 2025 Friendly	Obolon Kyiv (Ukraine)	2–0	(Ukraine) Kudrivka	Kyiv
EET (UTC+02:00)	Chernenko 22'; Kurko 80'	Report		Stadium: Obolon Arena

12 July 2025 Friendly	Kudrivka (Ukraine)	0–1	(Ukraine) Veres Rivne	Bucha
EET (UTC+02:00)		Report	Ndukve 90'	Stadium: Stadium Yuvileinyi

15 July 2025 Friendly	Kudrivka (Ukraine)	0–0	(Ukraine) Viktoriya Sumy	Bucha
EET (UTC+02:00)		Report		Stadium: Stadium Yuvileinyi

18 July 2025 Friendly	Livyi Bereh Kyiv (Ukraine)	1–1	(Ukraine) Kudrivka	Kyiv
EET (UTC+02:00)	Shastal 45'	Report	Vechurko 90'	Stadium: Livyi Bereh training complex

25 July 2025 Friendly	LNZ Cherkasy (Ukraine)	2–1	(Ukraine) Kudrivka
EET (UTC+02:00)	Jashari 45'; Bennette 61'	Report	Kozak 2'

26 July 2025 Friendly	Kudrivka (Ukraine)	5–1	(Ukraine) FC Kalynivka	Bucha
EET (UTC+02:00)				Stadium: Stadium Yuvileinyi

12 October 2025 Friendly	Kudrivka (Ukraine)	1–1	(Ukraine) Epitsentr	Bucha
EET (UTC+02:00)				Stadium: Stadium Yuvileinyi

15 November 2025 Friendly	Obolon Kyiv (Ukraine)	1–2	(Ukraine) Kudrivka	Bucha
EET (UTC+02:00)	Lomnytskyi 62'	Report	Kozak 7'; Lyehostayev 85'	Stadium: NTB Obolon

16 January 2026 Friendly	Kudrivka (Ukraine)	0–2	(Kosovo) Malisheva	Side, Turkey
EET (UTC+02:00)		Report

20 January 2026 Friendly	Kudrivka (Ukraine)	1–1	(Bulgaria) Arda	Side, Turkey
EET (UTC+02:00)

22 January 2026 Friendly	Kudrivka (Ukraine)	4–0	(Slovakia) Trenčín	Side, Turkey
EET (UTC+02:00)	Kozak 6'; Serdyuk 30'; Svityukha 50'; Morozko 63'	Report

26 January 2026 Friendly	Kudrivka (Ukraine)	1–2	(Denmark) Fredericia	Side, Turkey
EET (UTC+02:00)	Owusu 8'		Etim 31'; Huldahl 31'

27 January 2026 Friendly	Kudrivka (Ukraine)	0–0	(North Macedonia) Sileks	Side, Turkey
EET (UTC+02:00)		Report

30 January 2026 Friendly	Kudrivka (Ukraine)	0–0	(Kosovo) Llapi	Side, Turkey
EET (UTC+02:00)

31 January 2026 Friendly	Kudrivka (Ukraine)	1–2	(Poland) Polonia Warsaw	Side, Turkey
EET (UTC+02:00)	Lyehostayev 32'	Report	Vasin 3'; Vasin 59'

8 February 2026 Friendly	Veres Rivne (Ukraine)	1–0	(Ukraine) Kudrivka	Side, Turkey
EET (UTC+02:00)		Report

9 February 2026 Friendly	Dynamo Kyiv (Ukraine)	2–1	(Ukraine) Kudrivka	Side, Turkey
EET (UTC+02:00)		Report

13 February 2026 Friendly	Kudrivka (Ukraine)	1–2	(Czech Republic) Opava	Side, Turkey
EET (UTC+02:00)

14 February 2026 Friendly	Kudrivka (Ukraine)	1–0	(Kyrgyzstan) Toktogul	Side, Turkey
EET (UTC+02:00)	Demchenko 89' (pen.)	Report

3 March 2026 Friendly	Kudrivka (Ukraine)	0–3	(Ukraine) UCSA
EET (UTC+02:00)		Report

24 March 2026 Friendly	Zorya Luhansk (Ukraine)	2–4	(Ukraine) Kudrivka
EET (UTC+02:00)

28 March 2026 Friendly	Veres Rivne (Ukraine)	1–4	(Ukraine) Kudrivka	Rivne
EET (UTC+02:00)		Report		Stadium: Avanhard Stadium

== Competitions ==
=== Overall ===
Competition	First match	Last match	Starting round	Final position	Record							
Competition	First match	Last match	Starting round	Final position	Pld	W	D	L	GF	GA	GD	Win %
Premier League	3 August 2025	23 May 2026	1st	13th	30	7	7	16	34	49	−15	23.33
Ukrainian Cup	23 August 2025	23 August 2025	Round of 64 (1/32)	Round of 64 (1/32)	1	0	1	0	0	0	+0	0.00
First League Relegation play-offs	5 June 2026	9 June 2026	10 June 2026	Winner	2	0	2	0	2	2	+0	0.00
Total					33	7	10	16	36	51	−15	21.21

Source: Results

=== Premier League ===
==== League table ====
Pos	Team	Pld	W	D	L	GF	GA	GD	Pts	Qualification or relegation
11	Veres Rivne	30	7	10	13	26	40	−14	31 (Note: Ranked on head-to-head points: Veres Rivne 4, Obolon Kyiv 1)	
12	Obolon Kyiv	30	7	10	13	28	49	−21	31	
13	Kudrivka (O)	30	7	7	16	32	48	−16	28	Qualification for the Relegation play-off
14	Rukh Lviv (Note: Oleksandriya were selected for the relegation play-offs as the replacement for the withdrawn Rukh Lviv. Officially, Rukh withdrew to concentrate on the youth football only, but rumors had that Rukh Lviv will be competing in the Ukrainian Second League. Later, they were indeed accepted to the Ukrainian Second League.) (W, R)	30	6	3	21	20	51	−31	21	Excluded from the competitions
15	Oleksandriya (R)	30	3	8	19	24	58	−34	17	Qualification for the Relegation play-off

Updated to match(es) played on 24 May 2026. Source: upl.ua
Rules for classification: 1) Points; 2) Head-to-head points; 3) Head-to-head goal difference; 4) Head-to-head goals scored; 5) Goal difference; 6) Goals scored; 7) Draw or "Golden match" if two teams tied for title (Article 22, paragraph 3).
(O) Relegation play-offs winner; (R) Relegated; (W) Excluded from the competitions
Notes:

Teams that placed 13th and 14th in the 2025–26 Ukrainian Premier League play a two-leg play-off with the third and fourth teams of the 2025–26 Ukrainian First League.

The withdrawn 14th-placed Rukh Lviv (Note: The participation of FC Rukh in the relegation playoffs is to be confirmed, since the owner announced that the club may not participate in that stage.) was replaced with the 15th-placed FC Oleksandriya.

This round includes 2 clubs from the Premier League: FC Oleksandriya and Kudrivka; 2 clubs from the First League: Livyi Bereh Kyiv and Ahrobiznes Volochysk.

Premier League teams	Agg.	First League teams	1st leg	2nd leg
FC Oleksandriya	1–2	Livyi Bereh Kyiv	1–1	0–1
Kudrivka	2–2 (3–2 p)	Ahrobiznes Volochysk	0–0	2–2

=== First Semi-final ===
5 June 2025
15:30

FC Oleksandriya	1–1	Livyi Bereh Kyiv
Yade 21'	Report	Voloshyn 51'

CSC Nika, Oleksandriya
Attendance: 1170
Referee: Oleksiy Derevinskyi (Khmelnytskyi)

9 June 2026
15:30

Livyi Bereh Kyiv	1–0	FC Oleksandriya
Banada 45'	Report

Arena Livyi Bereh, Kyiv
Attendance: 1285
Referee: Dmytro Panchyshyn (Kharkiv)

Livyi Bereh Kyiv won 2–1 on aggregate and promotion to Premier League.

==== Second Semi-final ====
5 June 2026
18:00

Kudrivka	0–0	Ahrobiznes Volochysk
	Report

Avanhard, Rivne
Attendance: 75
Referee: Vitaliy Romanov (Dnipro)

9 June 2026
18:00

Ahrobiznes Volochysk	2–2	Kudrivka
B. Kozak 70'; Tolochko 90+1' (p)	Report	Machelyuk 39'; Lyehostayev 81'
Penalties
Havrushko (penalty missed); B.Kozak (penalty scored); Riznyk (penalty missed); Nyzhnyk (penalty scored); Tolochko (penalty missed)	2–3	(penalty missed) Veklyak; (penalty scored) Dumanyuk; (penalty scored) Machelyuk; (penalty missed) Hlushchenko; (penalty scored) Lyehostayev

Ternopilskyi miskyi imeni Shukhevycha, Ternopil
Attendance: 2500
Referee: Oleksandr Shandor (Lviv)

2–2 on aggregate; Kudrivka won 3–2 on penalties

==== Results summary ====
Overall								Home						Away					
Pld	W	D	L	GF	GA	GD	Pts	W	D	L	GF	GA	GD	W	D	L	GF	GA	GD
29	7	6	16	31	46	−15	27	6	4	5	21	18	+3	1	2	11	10	28	−18

Last updated: 24 May 2026.
Source: Competitive matches

==== Results by round ====
Round	1	2	3	4	5	6	7	8	9	10	11	12	13	14	15	16	17	18	19	20	21	22	23	24	25	26	27	28	29	30
Ground	H	A	H	H	A	A	H	A	H	A	H	H	A	A	H	A	H	A	A	H	H	A	H	A	H	A	A	H	H	A
Result	W	L	W	D	L	L	W	L	D	L	W	L	L	L	L	D	D	W	D	D	L	L	L	L	L	D	L	W	W	L
Position	1	7	6	5	5	9	8	10	11	11	8	12	13	13	13	13	13	11	11	12	12	13	13	13	13	13	13	13	13	13

Updated to match(es) played on 24 May 2026. Source: Competitive matches
A = Away; H = Home; W = Win; D = Draw; L = Loss

==== Matches ====
3 August 2025 1	Kudrivka	3–1	Oleksandriya	Kyiv
15:30 EEST (UTC+03:00)	Storchous 18', 53'; Morozko 37'	Report	Yashkov 26' (o.g.)	Stadium: Obolon Arena; Attendance: 864; Referee: Yevhen Tsybulko

11 August 2025 2	Zorya Luhansk	2–1	Kudrivka	Kyiv
15:30 EEST (UTC+03:00)	Salenko 22'; Jordan 56'	Report	Lyehostayev 50'	Stadium: Lobanovskyi Stadium; Attendance: 792; Referee: Dmytro Yevtukhov

17 August 2025 3	Kudrivka	3–1	Poltava	Kyiv
15:30 EEST (UTC+03:00)	Shapoval 5', 50' (p); Kozak 36'	Report	Onishchenko (90̟+4)	Stadium: Obolon Arena; Attendance: 873; Referee: Artem Mykhailiuk

29 August 2025 4	Kudrivka	2–2	Karpaty Lviv	Kyiv
15:30 EEST (UTC+03:00)	Rohozynskyi 3'; Storchous 43'	Report	Álvarez 52'; Pedroso (90̟+3)	Stadium: Obolon Arena; Attendance: 1053; Referee: Viktor Kopievskii

12 September 2025 5	Veres Rivne	2–0	Kudrivka	Rivne
15:30 EEST (UTC+03:00)	Boyko 7'; Smiyan 52'	Report		Stadium: Avanhard Stadium; Attendance: 3200; Referee: Oleksandr Shandor

30 September 2025 6	Polissya Zhytomyr	2–0	Kudrivka	Zhytomyr
15:30 EEST (UTC+03:00)		Report		Stadium: Tsentralnyi Stadion, Attendance: 2300; Referee: Roman Blavatskyi

26 September 2025 7	Kudrivka	2–1	Epitsentr	Kyiv
15:30 EEST (UTC+03:00)	Moroz 65' (o.g.); Totovytskyi 85'	Report	Ceberio 33'	Stadium: Obolon Arena; Attendance: 1050

5 October 2025 8	Kryvbas Kryvyi Rih	3–1	Kudrivka	Kryvyi Rih
15:30 EEST (UTC+03:00)		Report		Attendance: 600; Referee: Oleksandr Afanasiev

20 October 2025 9	Kudrivka	1–1	Metalist 1925 Kharkiv	Kyiv
15:30 EEST (UTC+03:00)	Storchous 135'	Report	Itodo 67'	Stadium: Obolon Arena; Attendance: 680; Referee: MykhailO Raida

26 October 2025 10	Shakhtar Donetsk	4–0	Kudrivka	Lviv
15:30 EEST (UTC+03:00)	Kauã Elias 7', 51'; Ocheretko 32' (yellow card) 52'; Marlon (yellow card) 50'; Hlushchenko (yellow card) 71' (goal) 87'	Report	Melnychuk (yellow card) 64'; Korkishko (penalty missed) 72'	Stadium: Arena Lviv; Attendance: 2,354; Referee: Roman Blavatsky

31 October 2025 11	Kudrivka	1–0	Obolon Kyiv	Kyiv
15:30 EEST (UTC+03:00)		Report		Stadium: Obolon Arena; Attendance: 1111; Referee: Volodymyr Novohatnii

7 November 2025 12	Kudrivka	1–3	Kolos Kovalivka	Kyiv
15:30 EEST (UTC+03:00)		Report		Stadium: Obolon Arena; Attendance: 893; Referee: Sofiia Prychyna

23 November 2025 13	Rukh Lviv	4–2	Kudrivka	Lviv
EET (UTC+02:00)		Report		Stadium: Arena Lviv; Attendance: 541

29 November 2025 14	LNZ Cherkasy	1–0	Kudrivka	Cherkasy
EET (UTC+02:00)		Report		Stadium: Cherkasy Arena

5 December 2025 15	Kudrivka	1–2	Dynamo Kyiv	Kyiv
15:30 EEST (UTC+03:00)	Mamrosenko (yellow card) 58'; Rohozynskyi (yellow card) 63'; Nahnoynyi 66'; Serdyuk (yellow card) 74'	Report	Pikhalyonok 10'; Ponomarenko 38'; Vivcharenko (yellow card) 48'; Thiaré (yellow card) 90+2'	Stadium: Obolon Arena; Attendance: 2020; Referee: Oleksandr Omelchenko

12 December 2025 16	Oleksandriya	1–1	Kudrivka	Oleksandria
EET (UTC+02:00)		Report		Stadium: CSC Nika; Attendance: 598

21 February 2026 17	Kudrivka	2–2	Zorya Luhansk	Rivne
15:30 EEST (UTC+03:00)		Report		Stadium: Avanhard Stadium

2 March 2026 18	Poltava	0–2	Kudrivka	Kyiv
EET (UTC+02:00)		Report		Stadium: Obolon Arena; Attendance: 150

7 March 2026 19	Karpaty Lviv	1–1	Kudrivka	Lviv
EET (UTC+02:00)	Kostenko 5'; Stênio (yellow card) 90+4'	Report	Nahnoynyi (yellow card) 45+1'; Faryna (yellow card) 54'; Kozak 66'; Husiev (yellow card) 83'	Stadium: Ukraina Stadium; Attendance: 3,600; Referee: Yevhen Tsybulko

14 March 2026 20	Kudrivka	0–0	Veres Rivne	Rivne
15:30 EEST (UTC+03:00)		Report		Stadium: Avanhard Stadium; Attendance: 756

21 March 2026 21	Kudrivka	0–2	Polissya Zhytomyr	Rivne
15:30 EEST (UTC+03:00)		Report		Stadium: Avanhard Stadium

4 April 2026 22	Epitsentr	1–0	Kudrivka	Zolocha hromada
EET (UTC+02:00)		Report		Stadium: Arena Livyi Bereh

11 April 2026 23	Kudrivka	1–2	Kryvbas Kryvyi Rih	Rivne
15:30 EEST (UTC+03:00)				Stadium: Avanhard Stadium

18 April 2026 24	Metalist 1925 Kharkiv	1–0	Kudrivka	Zhytomyr
EET (UTC+02:00)		Report		Stadium: Tsentralnyi Stadion

26 April 2026 25	Kudrivka	1–3	Shakhtar Donetsk	Lviv
18:00 EEST (UTC+3)	Kozak 54' (yellow card) 62'	Report	Newerton 18'; Meirelles 37'; Bondarenko 57'	Stadium: Arena Lviv; Attendance: 465; Referee: Roman Blavatskyi

3 May 2026 26	Obolon Kyiv	1–1	Kudrivka	Kyiv
EET (UTC+02:00)		Report		Stadium: Obolon Arena; Attendance: 1890

9 May 2026 27	Kolos Kovalivka	1–0	Kudrivka	Kovalivka
EET (UTC+02:00)		Report		Stadium: Kolos Stadium; Attendance: 1244

14 May 2026 28	Kudrivka	2–1	Rukh Lviv	Rivne
15:30 EEST (UTC+03:00)		Report		Stadium: Avanhard Stadium; Attendance: 48

18 May 2026 29	Kudrivka	1–0	LNZ Cherkasy	Rivne
15:30 EEST (UTC+03:00)		Report		Stadium: Avanhard Stadium; Attendance: 180

23 May 2026 30	Dynamo Kyiv	3–2	Kudrivka	Kyiv
EET (UTC+02:00)		Report		Stadium: Valeriy Lobanovskyi Stadium

=== Relegation play-offs ===
5 June 2026 1	Kudrivka	0-0	Ahrobiznes Volochysk	Rivne
EEST (UTC+3)		Report		Stadium: Avanhard Stadium; Attendance: 75

9 June 2026 2	Ahrobiznes Volochysk	2-2 (5–6 p)	Kudrivka	Ternopil
EEST (UTC+3)	B. Kozak 70'; Tolochko 90+1' (p)	Report	Machelyuk 39'; Lyehostayev 81'	Stadium: Ternopilskyi miskyi imeni Shukhevycha; Attendance: 2500; Referee: Oleksandr Shandor (Lviv)
	Penalties
	Havrushko (penalty missed); B.Kozak (penalty scored); Riznyk (penalty missed); Nyzhnyk (penalty scored); Tolochko (penalty missed)		(penalty missed) Veklyak; (penalty scored) Dumanyuk; (penalty scored) Machelyuk; (penalty missed) Hlushchenko; (penalty scored) Lyehostayev

=== Ukrainian Cup ===
23 August 2025 Round of 64 (1/32)	Livyi Bereh Kyiv	0-0 (a.e.t.) (3–0 p)	Kudrivka	Hnidyn, Kyiv Oblast
EEST (UTC+3)				Stadium: Arena Livyi Bereh; Attendance: 712; Referee: R.Blavatskyi (Lviv)
	Penalties
	Dedukh (penalty scored); Wendell (penalty scored); Sidnney (penalty scored)		(penalty missed) Lytovchenko; (penalty missed) Kozak; (penalty missed) Shapoval

== Statistics ==
=== Appearances and goals ===
No.	Pos	Nat	Player	Total		Ukrainian Premier League		Ukrainian Cup		Play-offs	
No.	Pos	Nat	Player	Apps	Goals	Apps	Goals	Apps	Goals	Apps	Goals
Goalkeepers
38	GK	(Ukraine) UKR	Anton Yashkov	24	0	22	0	0	0	2	0
44	GK	(Ukraine) UKR	Illya Karavashchenko	4	0	4	0	0	0	0	0
73	GK	(Ukraine) UKR	Mykhaylo Kulyk	0	0	0	0	0	0	0	0
Defenders
3	DF	(Ukraine) UKR	Yaroslav Kysil	2	0	2	0	0	0	0	0
17	DF	(Ukraine) UKR	Myroslav Serdyuk	21	0	21	0	0	0	0	0
29	DF	(Ukraine) UKR	Denys Nahnoynyi	24	2	22	2	0	0	2	0
39	DF	(Ukraine) UKR	Artem Machelyuk	29	1	27	0	0	0	2	1
69	DF	(Ukraine) UKR	Yuriy Potimkov	10	0	8	0	0	0	2	0
74	DF	(Ukraine) UKR	Maryan Faryna	12	0	10	0	0	0	2	0
91	DF	(Ukraine) UKR	Maksym Melnychuk	18	0	17	0	0	0	1	0
Midfielders
7	MF	(Ukraine) UKR	Oleksandr Byelyayev	12	0	10	0	0	0	2	0
8	MF	(Ukraine) UKR	Andriy Storchous	30	12	27	12	1	0	2	0
10	MF	(Ukraine) UKR	Oleksandr Kozak	28	4	25	4	1	0	2	0
14	MF	(Republic of the Congo) CGO	Kaya Makosso	11	0	9	0	0	0	2	0
19	MF	(Ukraine) UKR	Artur Dumanyuk	29	1	26	1	1	0	2	0
21	MF	(Ukraine) UKR	Anton Hlushchenko	14	0	12	0	0	0	2	0
22	MF	(Ukraine) UKR	Bohdan Veklyak	19	1	16	1	1	0	2	0
23	MF	(Nigeria) NGR	Victor Adeoye	3	0	3	0	0	0	0	0
27	MF	(Ukraine) UKR	Oleh Pushkaryov	13	0	10	0	1	0	2	0
30	MF	(Ukraine) UKR	Oleksiy Husiev	15	0	15	0	0	0	0	0
33	MF	(Ukraine) UKR	Yevheniy Morozko	22	2	22	2	0	0	0	0
78	MF	(Ukraine) UKR	Valeriy Rohozynskyi	11	1	10	1	1	0	0	0
Forwards
9	FW	(North Macedonia) MKD	Alban Taipi	7	0	7	0	0	0	0	0
11	FW	(Ukraine) UKR	Roman Solodarenko	0	0	0	0	0	0	0	0
20	FW	(Ukraine) UKR	Denys Svityukha	23	1	21	1	0	0	2	0
24	FW	(Ghana) GHA	Raymond Owusu	25	1	23	1	0	0	2	0
77	FW	(Ukraine) UKR	Artem Lyehostayev	28	2	26	1	0	0	2	1
Players transferred out during the season
1	GK	(Ukraine) UKR	Roman Lyopka	6	0	5	0	1	0	0	0
5	MF	(Ukraine) UKR	Andriy Totovytskyi	6	1	6	1	0	0	0	0
6	MF	(Ukraine) UKR	Mykola Vechurko	1	0	0	0	1	0	0	0
7	FW	(Ukraine) UKR	Dmytro Korkishko	10	0	9	0	1	0	0	0
10	FW	(Ukraine) UKR	Oleksiy Lytovchenko	6	0	5	0	1	0	0	0
13	DF	(Ukraine) UKR	Vladyslav Shapoval	8	2	7	2	1	0	0	0
14	MF	(Ukraine) UKR	Kyrylo Matvyeyev	7	0	7	0	0	0	0	0
21	FW	(Ukraine) UKR	Denys Bezborodko	4	0	3	0	1	0	0	0
23	FW	(Ukraine) UKR	Maksym Andrushchenko	0	0	0	0	0	0	0	0
27	MF	(Ukraine) UKR	Mykhaylo Shershen	1	0	1	0	0	0	0	0
45	MF	(Ukraine) UKR	Ivan Melnychenko	1	0	1	0	0	0	0	0
55	MF	(Ecuador) ECU	Jair Collahuazo	10	0	10	0	0	0	0	0
66	MF	(Ukraine) UKR	Ivan Losenko	12	0	12	0	0	0	0	0
88	DF	(Ukraine) UKR	Oleksandr Yevtushenko	1	0	1	0	0	0	0	0
90	DF	(Ukraine) UKR	Ivan Mamrosenko	9	0	8	0	1	0	0	0
97	MF	(Ukraine) UKR	Anton Demchenko	5	0	4	0	1	0	0	0
99	DF	(Ukraine) UKR	Roman Hahun	0	0	0	0	0	0	0	0

Source: Competitions

Last updated: 10 June 2026

=== Goalscorers ===
Rank	No.	Pos	Nat	Name	Premier League	Cup	Play-offs	Total
1	8	MF	(Ukraine)	Andriy Storchous	12	0	0	12
2	10	MF	(Ukraine)	Oleksandr Kozak	4	0	0	4
3	13	DF	(Ukraine)	Vladyslav Shapoval	2	0	0	2
4	33	MF	(Ukraine)	Yevheniy Morozko	2	0	0	2
5	29	MF	(Ukraine)	Denys Nahnoynyi	2	0	0	2
6	77	FW	(Ukraine)	Artem Lyehostayev	1	0	1	2
7	78	MF	(Ukraine)	Valeriy Rohozynskyi	1	0	0	1
8	55	MF	(Ukraine)	Ivan Losenko	1	0	0	1
9	20	FW	(Ukraine)	Denys Svityukha	1	0	0	1
10	5	MF	(Ukraine)	Andriy Totovytskyi	1	0	0	1
11	19	MF	(Ukraine)	Artur Dumanyuk	1	0	0	1
12	24	FW	(Ghana)	Raymond Owusu	1	0	0	1
13	22	MF	(Ukraine)	Bohdan Veklyak	1	0	0	1
14	39	DF	(Ukraine)	Artem Machelyuk	0	0	1	1
				Total	25	0	2	27

Last updated: 10 June 2026

=== Clean sheets ===
Rank	No.	Pos	Nat	Name	Ukrainian Premier League	Ukrainian Cup	Play-offs	Total
1	37	GK	(Ukraine)	Anton Yashkov	3	0	1	4
2	44	GK	(Ukraine)	Illya Karavashchenko	1	0	0	1
3	35	GK	(Ukraine)	Roman Lyopka	0	1	0	1
				Total	4	1	1	6

Last updated: 5 June 2026

=== Disciplinary record ===
No.	Pos	Nat	Player	Ukrainian Premier League			Ukrainian Cup			Play-offs			Total		
No.	Pos	Nat	Player	Yellow card	(yellow card) (yellow-red card)	Red card	Yellow card	(yellow card) (yellow-red card)	Red card	Yellow card	(yellow card) (yellow-red card)	Red card	Yellow card	(yellow card) (yellow-red card)	Red card
19	MF	(Ukraine)	Artur Dumanyuk	5	0	0	0	0	0	2	0	0	7	0	0
24	MF	(Ghana)	Raymond Owusu	5	0	0	0	0	0	0	0	0	5	0	0
30	MF	(Ukraine)	Oleksiy Husiev	4	0	0	0	0	0	0	0	0	4	0	0
29	MF	(Ukraine)	Denys Nahnoynyi	3	0	0	0	0	0	0	0	0	3	0	0
21	DF	(Ukraine)	Maksym Melnychuk	3	0	0	0	0	0	1	0	0	3	0	0
10	MF	(Ukraine)	Oleksandr Kozak	3	0	0	0	0	0	0	0	0	3	0	0
22	MF	(Ukraine)	Bohdan Veklyak	1	0	0	1	0	0	1	0	0	3	0	0
37	GK	(Ukraine)	Anton Yashkov	2	0	0	0	0	0	0	0	0	2	0	0
55	MF	(Ukraine)	Ivan Losenko	2	0	0	0	0	0	0	0	0	2	0	0
74	DF	(Ukraine)	Maryan Faryna	2	0	0	0	0	0	0	0	0	2	0	0
33	MF	(Ukraine)	Yevheniy Morozko	2	0	0	0	0	0	0	0	0	2	0	0
20	FW	(Ukraine)	Denys Svityukha	2	0	0	0	0	0	1	0	0	3	0	0
20	DF	(Ukraine)	Vladyslav Shapoval	2	0	0	0	0	0	0	0	0	2	0	0
90	DF	(Ukraine)	Ivan Mamrosenko	1	0	0	1	0	0	0	0	0	2	0	0
7	FW	(Ukraine)	Dmytro Korkishko	1	0	0	1	0	0	0	0	0	2	0	0
69	DF	(Ukraine)	Yuriy Potimkov	1	0	0	1	0	0	0	0	0	2	0	0
5	MF	(Ukraine)	Andriy Totovytskyi	1	0	0	0	0	0	0	0	0	1	0	0
17	MF	(Ukraine)	Myroslav Serdyuk	1	0	0	0	0	0	0	0	0	1	0	0
77	FW	(Ukraine)	Artem Lyehostayev	1	0	0	0	0	0	0	0	0	1	0	0
8	MF	(Ukraine)	Andriy Storchous	1	0	0	0	0	0	0	0	0	1	0	0
17	DF	(Ukraine)	Myroslav Serdyuk	1	0	0	0	0	0	0	0	0	1	0	0
78	MF	(Ukraine)	Valeriy Rohozynskyi	1	0	0	0	0	0	0	0	0	1	0	0
97	MF	(Ecuador)	Jair Collahuazo	1	0	0	0	0	0	0	0	0	1	0	0
97	MF	(Ukraine)	Anton Demchenko	0	0	0	1	0	0	0	0	0	1	0	0
14	MF	(Republic of the Congo)	Kaya Makosso	0	0	0	1	0	0	0	0	0	1	0	0
			Total	44	0	0	4	0	0	4	0	0	53	0	0

Last updated: 10 June 2026
