= 2025–26 in Ukrainian football =

Football in Ukraine
- Season: 2025–26

Men's football
- Premier League: Shakhtar Donetsk
- First League: Bukovyna Chernivtsi
- Second League: FC Kulykiv-Bilka
- AAFU: Ahrotekh Tyshkivka
- Cup: Dynamo Kyiv
- Amateur Cup: Avanhard Lozova
- Super Cup: not held

Women's football
- Vyshcha Liha: Metalist 1925 Kharkiv
- Persha Liha: FC Mariupol
- Women's Cup: Metalist 1925 Kharkiv

The 2025–26 season is the 35th season of competitive association football in Ukraine since the dissolution of the Soviet Union.

With the continuation of the Russo-Ukrainian War, the Ukrainian Association of Football (UAF) decided to go forward with the continuation of another season. The UAF approved round-robin tournaments in all national league competitions under strict safety precautions.

== National teams ==
=== Ukraine national football team ===
==== 2026 FIFA World Cup ====
===== Group D =====
Pos	Team	Pld	W	D	L	GF	GA	GD	Pts	Qualification	(France national football team)	(Ukraine national football team)	(Iceland national football team)	(Azerbaijan national football team)
1	France	6	5	1	0	16	4	+12	16	Qualification for 2026 FIFA World Cup	—	4–0	2–1	3–0
2	Ukraine	6	3	1	2	10	11	−1	10	Advance to play-offs	0–2	—	2–0	2–1
3	Iceland	6	2	1	3	13	11	+2	7		2–2	3–5	—	5–0
4	Azerbaijan	6	0	1	5	3	16	−13	1		1–3	1–1	0–2	—

Source: FIFA, UEFA

===== Path B =====
Home team	Score	Away team
Semi-finals
Ukraine	1–3	Sweden
Poland	2–1	Albania
Final
Sweden	3–2	Poland

=== Ukraine women's national football team ===
==== 2027 FIFA Women's World Cup ====
===== Group A3 =====
Pos	Team	Pld	W	D	L	GF	GA	GD	Pts	Qualification or relegation	(Spain)	(England)	(Iceland)	(Ukraine)
1	Spain	6	5	0	1	21	3	+18	15	Qualification to 2027 FIFA Women's World Cup	—	4–0	3–0	5–0
2	England	6	5	0	1	13	5	+8	15	Advance to play-offs	1–0	—	2–0	3–0
3	Iceland	6	2	0	4	3	12	−9	6	Advance to play-offs	1–6	0–1	—	1–0
4	Ukraine (R)	6	0	0	6	2	19	−17	0	Advance to play-offs and relegation to League B	1–3	1–6	0–1	—

Source: UEFA
(R) Relegated

== UEFA competitions ==
2025–26 season (UEFA competitions)
- Men's teams in Europe
- Dynamo Kyiv (UCL); Shakhtar Donetsk (UEL); Polissya Zhytomyr (UECL); Oleksandriya (UECL)
- Women's teams in Europe
- Vorskla Poltava (UWCL); Metalist 1925 Kharkiv (UWCL); Kolos Kovalivka (UWEC)

=== UEFA Champions League ===
==== Qualifying phase and play-off round ====
===== Second qualifying round =====
Second qualifying round
Team 1	Agg.	Team 2	1st leg	2nd leg
Champions Path
Hamrun Spartans (Malta)	0–6	(Ukraine) Dynamo Kyiv	0–3	0–3

- Due to the Russo-Ukrainian War, Dynamo Kyiv played its home matches in Lublin, Poland.

===== Third qualifying round =====
Third qualifying round
Team 1	Agg.	Team 2	1st leg	2nd leg
Champions Path
Dynamo Kyiv (Ukraine)	0–3	(Cyprus) Pafos	0–1	0–2

- Due to the Russo-Ukrainian War, Dynamo Kyiv played its home matches in Lublin, Poland.

=== UEFA Europa League ===
==== Qualifying phase and play-off round ====
===== First qualifying round =====
First qualifying round
Team 1	Agg.	Team 2	1st leg	2nd leg
Shakhtar Donetsk (Ukraine)	6–0	(Finland) Ilves	6–0	0–0

- Due to the Russo-Ukrainian War, Shakhtar Donetsk played its home match in Ljubljana, Slovenia.

===== Second qualifying round =====
Second qualifying round
Team 1	Agg.	Team 2	1st leg	2nd leg
Beşiktaş (Turkey)	2–6	(Ukraine) Shakhtar Donetsk	2–4	0–2

- Due to the Russo-Ukrainian War, Shakhtar Donetsk played its home match in Kraków, Poland.

===== Third qualifying round =====
Second qualifying round
Team 1	Agg.	Team 2	1st leg	2nd leg
Panathinaikos (Greece)	0–0 (4–3 p)	(Ukraine) Shakhtar Donetsk	0–0	0–0

- Due to the Russo-Ukrainian War, Shakhtar Donetsk played its home match in Kraków, Poland.

===== Play-off round =====
Second qualifying round
Team 1	Agg.	Team 2	1st leg	2nd leg
Maccabi Tel Aviv (Israel)	3–2	(Ukraine) Dynamo Kyiv	3–1	0–1

=== UEFA Europe Conference League ===
==== Qualifying phase and play-off round ====
===== Second qualifying round =====
Second qualifying round
Team 1	Agg.	Team 2	1st leg	2nd leg
Main Path
Polissya Zhytomyr (Ukraine)	5–3	(Andorra) FC Santa Coloma	1–2	4–1
Oleksandriya (Ukraine)	0–6	(Serbia) Partizan	0–2	0–4

- Due to the Russo-Ukrainian War, Polissya Zhytomyr played its home match in Prešov (originally Košice), Slovakia, while Oleksandriya played its home match in Katowice, Poland.

===== Third qualifying round =====
Third qualifying round
Team 1	Agg.	Team 2	1st leg	2nd leg
Main Path
Polissya Zhytomyr (Ukraine)	4–2	(Hungary) Paks	3–0	1–2

- Due to the Russo-Ukrainian War, Polissya Zhytomyr played its home match in Prešov, Slovakia.

===== Play-off round =====
Third qualifying round
Team 1	Agg.	Team 2	1st leg	2nd leg
Main Path
Shakhtar Donetsk (Ukraine)	3–2	(Switzerland) Servette	1–1	2–1 (a.e.t.)
Polissya Zhytomyr (Ukraine)	2–6	(Italy) Fiorentina	0–3	2–3

- Due to the Russo-Ukrainian War, Polissya Zhytomyr played its home match in Prešov, Slovakia, and Shakhtar Donetsk in Kraków, Poland.

==== League stage ====
===== Dynamo Kyiv =====
Pos	Team	Pld	W	D	L	GF	GA	GD	Pts
25	(Romanian Football Federation) Universitatea Craiova	6	2	1	3	6	8	−2	7
26	(Gibraltar Football Association) Lincoln Red Imps	6	2	1	3	7	15	−8	7
27	(Ukrainian Association of Football) Dynamo Kyiv	6	2	0	4	9	9	0	6
28	(Polish Football Association) Legia Warsaw	6	2	0	4	8	8	0	6
29	(Slovak Football Association) Slovan Bratislava	6	2	0	4	5	9	−4	6

Source: UEFA
Rules for classification: League phase tiebreakers

Home team	Score	Away team
Dynamo Kyiv (Ukraine)	0–2	(England) Crystal Palace
Samsunspor (Turkey)	3–0	(Ukraine) Dynamo Kyiv
Dynamo Kyiv (Ukraine)	6–0	(Bosnia and Herzegovina) Zrinjski Mostar
Omonia (Cyprus)	2–0	(Ukraine) Dynamo Kyiv
Fiorentina (Italy)	2–1	(Ukraine) Dynamo Kyiv
Dynamo Kyiv (Ukraine)	2–0	(Armenia) Noah

===== Shakhtar Donetsk =====
Pos	Team	Pld	W	D	L	GF	GA	GD	Pts	Qualification
4	(Football Association of the Czech Republic) Sparta Prague	6	4	1	1	10	3	+7	13	Advance to round of 16 (seeded)
5	(Royal Spanish Football Federation) Rayo Vallecano	6	4	1	1	13	7	+6	13	Advance to round of 16 (seeded)
6	(Ukrainian Association of Football) Shakhtar Donetsk	6	4	1	1	10	5	+5	13	Advance to round of 16 (seeded)
7	(German Football Association) Mainz 05	6	4	1	1	7	3	+4	13	Advance to round of 16 (seeded)
8	(Cyprus Football Association) AEK Larnaca	6	3	3	0	7	1	+6	12	Advance to round of 16 (seeded)

Source: UEFA
Rules for classification: League phase tiebreakers

Home team	Score	Away team
Aberdeen (Scotland)	2–3	(Ukraine) Shakhtar Donetsk
Shakhtar Donetsk (Ukraine)	1–2	(Poland) Legia Warsaw
Shakhtar Donetsk (Ukraine)	2–0	(Iceland) Breiðablik
Shamrock Rovers (Republic of Ireland)	1–2	(Ukraine) Shakhtar Donetsk
Hamrun Spartans (Malta)	0–2	(Ukraine) Shakhtar Donetsk
Shakhtar Donetsk (Ukraine)	0–0	(Croatia) Rijeka

==== Knockout stage ====
===== Round of 16 =====
Team 1	Agg.	Team 2	1st leg	2nd leg
Lech Poznań (Poland)	3–4	(Ukraine) Shakhtar Donetsk	1–3	2–1

==== Quarter-finals ====
Team 1	Agg.	Team 2	1st leg	2nd leg
Shakhtar Donetsk (Ukraine)	5–2	(Netherlands) AZ	3–0	2–2

==== Semi-finals ====
Team 1	Agg.	Team 2	1st leg	2nd leg
Shakhtar Donetsk (Ukraine)	2–5	(England) Crystal Palace	1–3	1–2

=== UEFA Women's Champions League ===
==== Qualifying rounds ====
===== Round 2 =====
====== Champions Path ======
Tournament 5

Hosted by Gintra.

Semi-finals
27 August
(Lithuania) Gintra	2
(Romania) Farul Constanța	1
27 August
(Ukraine) Vorskla Poltava	5
(Georgia (country)) Lanchkhuti	0

Final
30 August
(Lithuania) Gintra	0
(Ukraine) Vorskla Poltava	2
Third place
30 August
(Romania) Farul Constanța	4
(Georgia (country)) Lanchkhuti	1

====== League Path ======
Tournament 1

Hosted by Hammarby IF.

Semi-finals
27 August
(Sweden) Hammarby IF	5
(Ukraine) Metalist 1925 Kharkiv	4
27 August
(England) Manchester United	4
(Netherlands) PSV Eindhoven	0

Final
30 August
(Sweden) Hammarby IF	0
(England) Manchester United	1
Third place
30 August
(Ukraine) Metalist 1925 Kharkiv	0
(Netherlands) PSV Eindhoven	2

===== Round 3 =====
The winners of the ties advanced to the group stage. The losers will be transferred to the 2025–26 UEFA Women's Europa Cup second qualifying round.

Third qualifying round
Team 1	Agg.	Team 2	1st leg	2nd leg
Champions Path
Vorskla Poltava (Ukraine)	0–2	(Belgium) OH Leuven	0–2	0–0

- Due to the Russo-Ukrainian War, Vorskla Poltava played its home match in Leuven, Belgium.

=== UEFA Women's Europa Cup ===
==== Qualifying rounds ====
===== Round 1 =====
First Qualifying Round
Team 1	Agg.	Team 2	1st leg	2nd leg
Vllaznia (Albania)	4–0	(Ukraine) Kolos Kovalivka	2–0	2–0

- Due to the Russo-Ukrainian War, Kolos Kovalivka played its home match in Shkodër, Albania.

===== Round 2 =====
Second Qualifying Round
Team 1	Agg.	Team 2	1st leg	2nd leg
Vorskla Poltava (Ukraine)	1–2	(Denmark) Fortuna Hjørring	1–1	0–1

== Men's club football ==
League		Promoted to league	Relegated from league
Premier League		Epitsentr Kamianets-Podilskyi; Poltava; Metalist 1925 Kharkiv; Kudrivka	Chornomorets Odesa; Inhulets Petrove; Vorskla Poltava; Livyi Bereh Kyiv
PFL League 1		Probiy Horodenka; Chernihiv-ShVSM	Dinaz Vyshhorod; ~~Khust~~; ~~Mynai~~; ~~Kremin Kremenchuk~~
PFL League 2	Groups		
PFL League 2	A	Atlet Kyiv; Lisne; Bukovyna-2 Chernivtsi	~~Revera 1908 Ivano-Frankivsk~~; ~~Rukh-2 Lviv~~; ~~Vorskla-2 Poltava~~; ~~Metalist 1925-2 Kharkiv~~
PFL League 2	B	Rebel Kyiv; Penuel Kryvyi Rih; Chornomorets-2 Odesa; Livyi Bereh-2 Kyiv	~~Revera 1908 Ivano-Frankivsk~~; ~~Rukh-2 Lviv~~; ~~Vorskla-2 Poltava~~; ~~Metalist 1925-2 Kharkiv~~

Note: For all scratched clubs, see section Clubs removed for more details.

=== Premier League ===
Pos	Team	Pld	W	D	L	GF	GA	GD	Pts	Qualification or relegation
1	Shakhtar Donetsk (C)	30	22	6	2	71	21	+50	72	Qualification for the Champions League league phase (Note: Shakhtar Donetsk was moved to the Champions League league phase as the champion with the highest club coefficient in the Champions League qualifying rounds, due to re-balancing from the 2025–26 UEFA Champions League winner already qualifying for league phase via their domestic league.)
2	LNZ Cherkasy	30	18	6	6	39	17	+22	60	Qualification for the Conference League second qualifying round
3	Polissya Zhytomyr	30	18	5	7	51	21	+30	59	Qualification for the Conference League second qualifying round
4	Dynamo Kyiv (Note: Dynamo Kyiv is the winner of the 2025–26 Ukrainian Cup)	30	17	6	7	66	36	+30	57	Qualification for the Europa League first qualifying round
5	Metalist 1925 Kharkiv	30	13	12	5	36	19	+17	51	
6	Kolos Kovalivka	30	13	10	7	30	25	+5	49	
7	Kryvbas Kryvyi Rih	30	13	9	8	53	46	+7	48	
8	Zorya Luhansk	30	12	10	8	42	36	+6	46	
9	Karpaty Lviv	30	10	11	9	40	31	+9	41	
10	Epitsentr Kamianets-Podilskyi	30	8	8	14	36	45	−9	32	
11	Veres Rivne	30	7	10	13	26	40	−14	31 (Note: Ranked on head-to-head points: Veres Rivne 4, Obolon Kyiv 1)	
12	Obolon Kyiv	30	7	10	13	28	49	−21	31	
13	Kudrivka (O)	30	7	7	16	32	48	−16	28	Qualification for the Relegation play-off
14	Rukh Lviv (Note: Oleksandriya were selected for the relegation play-offs as the replacement for the withdrawn Rukh Lviv. Officially, Rukh withdrew to concentrate on the youth football only, but rumors had that Rukh Lviv will be competing in the Ukrainian Second League. Later, they were indeed accepted to the Ukrainian Second League.) (W, R)	30	6	3	21	20	51	−31	21	Excluded from the competitions
15	Oleksandriya (R)	30	3	8	19	24	58	−34	17	Qualification for the Relegation play-off
16	Poltava (R)	30	2	7	21	23	74	−51	13	Relegation to Ukrainian First League

Updated to match(es) played on 24 May 2026. Source: upl.ua
Rules for classification: 1) Points; 2) Head-to-head points; 3) Head-to-head goal difference; 4) Head-to-head goals scored; 5) Goal difference; 6) Goals scored; 7) Draw or "Golden match" if two teams tied for title (Article 22, paragraph 3).
(C) Champions; (O) Relegation play-offs winner; (R) Relegated; (W) Excluded from the competitions

==== Relegation play-offs ====
Teams that placed 13th and 14th in the 2025–26 Ukrainian Premier League play a two-leg play-off with the third and fourth teams of the 2025–26 Ukrainian First League.

The withdrawn 14th-placed Rukh Lviv (Note: The participation of FC Rukh in the relegation playoffs is to be confirmed, since the owner announced that the club may not participate in that stage.) was replaced with the 15th-placed FC Oleksandriya.

This round includes 2 clubs from the Premier League: FC Oleksandriya and Kudrivka; 2 clubs from the First League: Livyi Bereh Kyiv and Ahrobiznes Volochysk.

Premier League teams	Agg.	First League teams	1st leg	2nd leg
FC Oleksandriya	1–2	Livyi Bereh Kyiv	1–1	0–1
Kudrivka	2–2 (3–2 p)	Ahrobiznes Volochysk	0–0	2–2

=== First Semi-final ===
5 June 2025
15:30

FC Oleksandriya	1–1	Livyi Bereh Kyiv
Yade 21'	Report	Voloshyn 51'

CSC Nika, Oleksandriya
Attendance: 1170
Referee: Oleksiy Derevinskyi (Khmelnytskyi)

9 June 2026
15:30

Livyi Bereh Kyiv	1–0	FC Oleksandriya
Banada 45'	Report

Arena Livyi Bereh, Kyiv
Attendance: 1285
Referee: Dmytro Panchyshyn (Kharkiv)

Livyi Bereh Kyiv won 2–1 on aggregate and promotion to Premier League.

==== Second Semi-final ====
5 June 2026
18:00

Kudrivka	0–0	Ahrobiznes Volochysk
	Report

Avanhard, Rivne
Attendance: 75
Referee: Vitaliy Romanov (Dnipro)

9 June 2026
18:00

Ahrobiznes Volochysk	2–2	Kudrivka
B. Kozak 70'; Tolochko 90+1' (p)	Report	Machelyuk 39'; Lyehostayev 81'
Penalties
Havrushko (penalty missed); B.Kozak (penalty scored); Riznyk (penalty missed); Nyzhnyk (penalty scored); Tolochko (penalty missed)	2–3	(penalty missed) Veklyak; (penalty scored) Dumanyuk; (penalty scored) Machelyuk; (penalty missed) Hlushchenko; (penalty scored) Lyehostayev

Ternopilskyi miskyi imeni Shukhevycha, Ternopil
Attendance: 2500
Referee: Oleksandr Shandor (Lviv)

2–2 on aggregate; Kudrivka won 3–2 on penalties

=== PFL League 1 (First League) ===
Pos	Team	Pld	W	D	L	GF	GA	GD	Pts	Promotion, qualification or relegation
1	Bukovyna Chernivtsi (P, C)	30	26	3	1	74	21	+53	81	Promotion to Ukrainian Premier League
2	Chornomorets Odesa (P)	30	19	8	3	44	20	+24	65	Promotion to Ukrainian Premier League
3	Livyi Bereh Kyiv (O, P)	30	19	6	5	50	21	+29	63	Qualification to promotion play-offs
4	Ahrobiznes Volochysk	30	16	5	9	36	28	+8	53	Qualification to promotion play-offs
5	Inhulets Petrove	30	12	10	8	41	32	+9	46	
6	Prykarpattia-Blaho	30	9	10	11	33	33	0	37	
7	Metalist Kharkiv	30	10	7	13	31	35	−4	37	
8	Probiy Horodenka	30	10	6	14	29	37	−8	36 (Note: Ranked on head-to-head points Head-to-head goal difference Head-to-head goals scored: Probiy Horodenka 12 +3 5, Feniks-Mariupol 10 +3 5, Viktoriya Sumy 4 -3 6, UCSA Tarasivka 4 -3 2)	
9	Feniks-Mariupol	30	9	9	12	31	32	−1	36	
10	Viktoriya Sumy	30	10	6	14	37	38	−1	36	
11	UCSA Tarasivka	30	10	6	14	30	40	−10	36	
12	Nyva Ternopil	30	8	10	12	24	34	−10	34	
13	Chernihiv	30	8	7	15	30	36	−6	31	
14	Vorskla Poltava (W)	30	7	9	14	23	36	−13	30	Denied license
15	Podillya Khmelnytskyi (R)	30	4	9	17	20	45	−25	21	Relegation to Ukrainian Second League
16	Metalurh Zaporizhzhia (R)	30	4	7	19	16	61	−45	19	Relegation to Ukrainian Second League

Source: PFL.ua
Rules for classification: 1) Points; 2) Head-to-head points; 3) Head-to-head goal difference; 4) Head-to-head goals scored; 5) Goal difference in all games; 6) Goals scored in all games (Note: calculation by criteria indicated in rules 2, 3, 4 is conducted with consideration of all teams that have an equal number of tournament points at the moment of calculation and not only among those which after preliminary criteria have appeared more successful).
(C) Champions; (O) Relegation play-offs winner; (P) Promoted; (R) Relegated; (W) Denied license for the next season

==== Relegation play-offs ====
The relegation–promotion play-off games were expected to be scheduled to take place between the 13th and 14th-placed teams with the third and fourth-placed teams of the Second League. The draw was held on May 14, 2026. Following the withdrawal of Rukh Lviv in the Premier League, relegation play-offs were reduced, but later were canceled as Vorskla Poltava failed to receive the Professional Football League license for the next season. The third and fourth-placed teams of the Second League had received direct promotion to the First League.

=== PFL League 2 (Second League) ===
==== Group A ====
Pos	Team	Pld	W	D	L	GF	GA	GD	Pts	Promotion, qualification or relegation
1	Kulykiv-Bilka (C, P)	30	21	5	4	58	18	+40	68	Promotion to Ukrainian First League
2	Polissya-2 Zhytomyr (P)	30	18	9	3	69	22	+47	63	Promotion to Ukrainian First League
3	Nyva Vinnytsia	30	15	6	9	42	32	+10	51	
4	Sambir-Nyva-2 Ternopil	30	16	2	12	30	43	−13	50	
5	Atlet Kyiv	30	14	4	12	45	48	−3	46	
6	Uzhhorod (Note: FC Uzhhorod temporarily withdrew their first team from competition due to financial issues.)	30	13	5	12	40	37	+3	44 (Note: Ranked on head-to-head points: Uzhhorod 6, Skala 1911 Stryi 3.)	Withdrawn after the season
7	Skala 1911 Stryi	30	13	5	12	62	48	+14	44	
8	Vilkhivtsi	30	12	5	13	50	46	+4	41	
9	Lisne (D)	30	8	3	19	32	30	+2	27	Expelled (Note: Lisne was expelled from the league after Round 19 for failing to appear in two matches (against Uzhhorod in R14 and Vilkhivtsi in R19). All their remaining fixtures were awarded technical results –:+ against them.)
10	Bukovyna-2 Chernivtsi (Note: Bukovyna Chernivtsi announced that it withdraws their second team from the competition for the next season due to revival of the UPL under-21 competitions.)	30	7	6	17	31	57	−26	27	Withdrawn after the season
11	Real Pharma Odesa (Note: Real Pharma Odesa announced that it withdraws from professional competition and the next season will participate in the amateur competitions.)	30	1	4	25	18	96	−78	7	Withdrawn after the season

Source: PFL.ua
Rules for classification: 1) Points; 2) Head-to-head points; 3) Head-to-head goal difference; 4) Head-to-head goals scored; 5) Goal difference in all games; 6) Goals scored in all games (Note: calculation by criteria indicated in rules 2, 3, 4 is conducted with consideration of all teams that have equal number of tournament points at the moment of calculation and not only among those which after preliminary criteria have appeared more successful).
(C) Group winner; (D) Disqualified; (P) Promoted

==== Group B ====
Pos	Team	Pld	W	D	L	GF	GA	GD	Pts	Promotion, qualification or relegation
1	Lokomotyv Kyiv (C, P)	30	22	4	4	65	16	+49	70	Promotion to Ukrainian First League
2	Kolos-2 Kovalivka (P)	30	21	6	3	64	22	+42	69	Promotion to Ukrainian First League
3	Chaika Petropavlivska Borshchahivka (Note: Chaika Petropavlivska Borshchahivka announced they are stopping their participation in professional competitions temporarily.)	30	17	6	7	58	41	+17	57	Withdrawn after the season
4	Rebel Kyiv	30	15	5	10	34	27	+7	50	Withdrawn after the season
5	Livyi Bereh-2 Kyiv	30	13	9	8	50	28	+22	48	Withdrawn after the season
6	Trostianets	30	13	8	9	46	31	+15	47	
7	Oleksandriya-2	30	12	8	10	37	32	+5	44	
8	Chornomorets-2 Odesa	30	5	9	16	25	56	−31	24	Withdrawn after the season
9	Dinaz Vyshhorod	30	5	4	21	26	62	−36	19	
10	Penuel Kryvyi Rih	30	3	8	19	27	64	−37	17	
11	Hirnyk-Sport Horishni Plavni (Note: Hirnyk-Sport Horishni Plavni temporarily withdrew due to financial issues.)	30	3	5	22	20	73	−53	14	Withdrawn after the season

Source: PFL.ua
Rules for classification: 1) Points; 2) Head-to-head points; 3) Head-to-head goal difference; 4) Head-to-head goals scored; 5) Goal difference in all games; 6) Goals scored in all games (Note: calculation by criteria indicated in rules 2, 3, 4 is conducted with consideration of all teams that have equal number of tournament points at the moment of calculation and not only among those which after preliminary criteria have appeared more successful).
(C) Champions; (P) Promoted

==== The league's play-offs ====
Both groups' winners were expected to play each other for the season's title. Also, both these teams gained a direct promotion to the 2026–27 Ukrainian First League. At the same time, both groups' runners-up were expected to play among themselves for the season's third place and to play against the 13th- and 14th-placed teams in the Persha Liha (First League) for promotion. Later, promotion-relegation play-offs were cancelled.

Both matches, the league's final and third-place match, were played in a single-leg format and on a neutral field. A draw determined the hosting team for each match, which took place on May 15.

Third place final

Team 1	Score	Team 2
FC Kolos-2 Kovalivka	1 – 0	Polissya-2 Zhytomyr

27 May 2026	FC Kolos-2 Kovalivka	1:0	Polissya-2 Zhytomyr	Cherkasy
14:00	Taranukha 36'	Report		Stadium: Cherkasy Arena; Attendance: 30; Referee: Yevhen Makarenko (Cherkasy)

League's final

Team 1	Score	Team 2
FC Lokomotyv Kyiv	1 – 2	Kulykiv-Bilka

31 May 2026	FC Lokomotyv Kyiv	1:2	Kulykiv-Bilka	Khmelnytskyi
14:00	Mordas 55'	Report	Panasyuk 48'; Volkov 87'	Stadium: Sport Complex Podillia; Attendance: 500; Referee: Artem Hordynskyi (Vinnytsia)

=== Cup competitions ===
==== Ukrainian Cup ====
20 May 2026

Chernihiv (1L)	1–3	(PL) Dynamo Kyiv
Romanchenko 34'	Report	Buyalskyi 26', 53'; Yarmolenko 70'

Arena Lviv, Lviv
Attendance: 4,889
Referee: Oleksandr Shandor (Lviv)

== Women's club football ==
Promoted	Relegated
none	Obolon Kyiv

Note: For the scratched clubs, see section Clubs removed for more details

=== Vyshcha Liha ===
Pos	Team	Pld	W	D	L	GF	GA	GD	Pts	Qualification or relegation
1	Metalist 1925 Kharkiv	18	17	0	1	92	7	+85	51	Qualification for the Championship Group
2	Vorskla Poltava	18	15	1	2	61	19	+42	46	Qualification for the Championship Group
3	Seasters Odesa	18	12	2	4	42	19	+23	38	Qualification for the Championship Group
4	Kolos Kovalivka	18	10	1	7	46	20	+26	31	Qualification for the Championship Group
5	Shakhtar Donetsk	18	9	2	7	27	26	+1	29	Qualification for the Championship Group
6	Polissia Zhytomyr	18	7	3	8	32	49	−17	24	Qualification for the Relegation Group
7	Kryvbas Kryvyi Rih	18	4	4	10	20	46	−26	16	Qualification for the Relegation Group
8	Ladomyr Volodymyr	18	4	1	13	17	50	−33	13	Qualification for the Relegation Group
9	Pantery Uman	18	2	3	13	12	46	−34	9	Qualification for the Relegation Group
10	EMS Podillia Vinnytsia	18	0	3	15	10	77	−67	3	Qualification for the Relegation Group

Source: womensfootball.com.ua
Rules for classification: 1) Points; 2) Head-to-head points; 3) Head-to-head goal difference; 4) Head-to-head goals scored; 5) Goal difference; 6) Goals scored.

Pos	Team	Pld	W	D	L	GF	GA	GD	Pts	Qualification or relegation
1	Metalist 1925 Kharkiv (Note: Participant of the 2025–26 Ukrainian Women's Cup final.) (C)	26	22	3	1	112	10	+102	69	Qualification for the Champions League second qualifying round
2	Seasters Odesa	26	16	5	5	63	22	+41	53	Qualification for the Champions League second qualifying round
3	Vorskla Poltava (Note: Vorskla Poltava withdrew and waived their opportunity to compete in the European club competitions. Since Vorskla became unable to compete in the European competition, their berth was passed on to Kolos Kovalivka.)	26	16	1	9	65	46	+19	49	Withdrew after the season
4	Kolos Kovalivka	26	12	4	10	54	29	+25	40	Qualification for Europa Cup first qualifying round
5	Shakhtar Donetsk	26	12	3	11	36	46	−10	39	

Source: womensfootball.com.ua
Rules for classification: 1) Points; 2) Head-to-head points; 3) Head-to-head goal difference; 4) Head-to-head goals scored; 5) Goal difference; 6) Goals scored.
(C) Champions
Notes:

Pos	Team	Pld	W	D	L	GF	GA	GD	Pts	
6	Polissia Zhytomyr	26	12	4	10	51	58	−7	40	Promotion to Elite League
7	Pantery Uman	26	8	4	14	26	52	−26	28	Promotion to Elite League
8	Kryvbas Kryvyi Rih	26	7	6	13	33	58	−25	27	Promotion to Elite League
9	Ladomyr Volodymyr (Note: Ladomyr Volodymyr gained promotion after withdrawal of Vorskla Poltava.)	26	7	2	17	30	62	−32	23	Promotion to Elite League
10	EMS-Podillia Vinnytsia	26	0	4	22	15	102	−87	4	Qualification to Higher League

Source: womensfootball.com.ua
Rules for classification: 1) Points; 2) Head-to-head points; 3) Head-to-head goal difference; 4) Head-to-head goals scored; 5) Goal difference; 6) Goals scored.

== Managerial changes ==
This is a list of managerial changes among Ukrainian professional football clubs:

Team	Outgoing manager	Manner of departure	Date of vacancy	Table	Incoming manager	Date of appointment
				Pre-season		

== Clubs removed ==
=== Permanently lost professional status ===
- Balkany Zorya
- Karpaty Halych
- Zviahel
- Dnipro-1

=== Temporary inactive status ===
- Revera 1908 Ivano-Frankivsk
- Kremin Kremenchuk
- Druzhba Myrivka
- Kramatorsk
- Lyubomyr Stavyshche
- Mykolaiv
- Krystal Kherson
- Enerhiya Nova Kakhovka
- Tavriya Simferopol
- Kyiv
- Munkacs Mukacheve
