= Anton Demchenko (footballer) =

Ukrainian footballer (born 2003)

Personal information
- Full name: Anton Demchenko
- Date of birth: 6 January 2005 (age 21)
- Place of birth: Makiivka, Ukraine
- Height: 1.79 m (5 ft 10 in)
- Position: Midfielder

Team information
- Current team: Kudrivka
- Number: 97

Youth career
- 2020–2025: Shakhtar Donetsk

Senior career*
Years	Team	Apps	(Gls)
2025	Mynai	8	(4)
2025–	Kudrivka	4	(0)
2026	→ Podillya (loan)	12	(1)
2026–	→ Kudrivka U21 (loan)	4	(2)
- * Club domestic league appearances and goals as of 11 November 2026

Anton Demchenko (Ukrainian: Антон Володимирович Демченко; born 16 August 2003) is a Ukrainian professional footballer who plays as a midfielder for Kudrivka.

== Club career ==
He started playing football at the academies of Shakhtar Donetsk.

in March 2025, he signed for Mynai in Ukrainian First League. On 5 April 2025, he scored his first goal with the club against Metalurh Zaporizhzhia. He managed to play eight games and score four goals. But the club began to experience financial problems and lost its place in the Ukrainian First League.

In June 2025, Veres Rivne showed interest in the player, but in August 2025 he signed for Kudrivka in Ukrainian Premier League. On 17 August 2025, he made his debut in Ukrainian Premier League against Poltava at the Obolon Arena in Obolon.

On 21 February 2026, he was loaned to Podillya Khmelnytskyi in Ukrainian First League. He played 12 matches and scoring 1 goal against Inhulets Petrove at the Inhulets Stadium.

In the summer, he returned to Kudrivka, where he also played some matches with the Kudrivka U21 team. On 24 October 2026, he scored against Dynamo Kyiv in the 11th minute.

== Career statistics ==
As of match played 2 June 2026

Appearances and goals by club, season and competition
Club	Season	League			Cup		Europe		Other		Total	
Club	Season	Division	Apps	Goals	Apps	Goals	Apps	Goals	Apps	Goals	Apps	Goals
Mynai	2024–25	Ukrainian First League	8	4	0	0	0	0	0	0	8	4
Kudrivka	2025–26	Ukrainian Premier League	4	0	1	0	0	0	0	0	5	0
Kudrivka	2026–27	Ukrainian Premier League	0	0	0	0	0	0	0	0	0	0
Podillya (Loan)	2025–26	Ukrainian First League	12	1	0	0	0	0	0	0	12	1
Kudrivka U21 (Loan)	2026–27	Ukrainian League Under-21	4	2	0	0	0	0	0	0	4	2
Career total			28	7	1	0	0	0	0	0	29	7

== Honours ==
Shakhtar Donetsk U-19

- Ukrainian Premier League Reserves: (1) 2020–21
