= Denys Nahnoynyi =

Ukrainian footballer

Personal information
- Full name: Denys Oleksandrovych Nahnoynyi
- Date of birth: 3 February 2002 (age 24)
- Place of birth: Varva, Ukraine
- Height: 1.75 m (5 ft 9 in)
- Position: Defender

Team information
- Current team: Kudrivka (on loan from Metalist 1925 Kharkiv)
- Number: 29

Youth career
- 2014–2015: Yevropa Pryluky
- 2015–2018: UFK-Metal Kharkiv
- 2018: Volna Kharkiv
- 2018–2019: UFK-Metal Kharkiv

Senior career*
Years	Team	Apps	(Gls)
2019–2024	Zorya Luhansk	27	(2)
2024–	Metalist 1925 Kharkiv	3	(0)
2025–2026	→ Kudrivka (loan)	22	(1)
- * Club domestic league appearances and goals as of 24 May 2026

Denys Oleksandrovych Nahnoynyi (Ukrainian: Денис Олександрович Нагнойний; born 3 February 2002) is a Ukrainian professional footballer who plays as a defender for Kudrivka, on loan from Metalist 1925.

== Career ==
Born in Varva, Nahnoynyi is a product of the neighbouring Yevropa Pryluky and UFK-Metal Kharkiv youth sportive school systems.

=== Zorya Luhansk ===
In August 2019 he was signed by Zorya Luhansk and he made his league debut for the club as a second-half substitute against Oleksandriya on 9 May 2021.

=== Metalist 1925 Kharkiv ===
On 4 July 2024, Nahnoynyi joined Metalist 1925 Kharkiv on a four-year contract.

==== Kudrivka (Loan) ====
On 31 July 2025 he was loaned to Kudrivka in Ukrainian Premier League.

== Career statistics ==
As of match played 6 June 2026

Appearances and goals by club, season and competition
Club	Season	League			Cup		Europe		Other		Total	
Club	Season	Division	Apps	Goals	Apps	Goals	Apps	Goals	Apps	Goals	Apps	Goals
Zorya Luhansk	2019–20	Ukrainian Premier League	0	0	0	0	0	0	0	0	0	0
Zorya Luhansk	2020–21	Ukrainian Premier League	1	0	0	0	0	0	0	0	1	0
Zorya Luhansk	2021–22	Ukrainian Premier League	2	0	1	0	0	0	0	0	3	0
Zorya Luhansk	2022–23	Ukrainian Premier League	13	1	0	0	2	1	0	0	15	2
Zorya Luhansk	2023–24	Ukrainian Premier League	11	1	0	0	7	1	0	0	18	2
Total			27	2	1	0	9	2	0	0	37	4
Metalist 1925 Kharkiv	2024–25	Ukrainian First League	3	0	0	0	0	0	0	0	3	0
Total			3	0	0	0	0	0	0	0	3	0
Kudrivka (Loan)	2025–26	Ukrainian Premier League	22	1	0	0	0	0	1	0	23	1
Kudrivka (Loan)	Total		22	1	0	0	0	0	1	0	23	1
Career total			52	3	2	0	9	2	1	0	64	5
