= Maryan Faryna =

Ukrainian footballer

Personal information
- Full name: Maryan Ivanovych Faryna
- Date of birth: 28 August 2003 (age 23)
- Place of birth: Kamiane, Lviv Oblast, Ukraine
- Height: 1.80 m (5 ft 11 in)
- Position: Centre-back

Team information
- Current team: Chornomorets Odesa (on loan from Shakhtar Donetsk)
- Number: 74

Youth career
- 2013–2015: DYuSSh Zhydachiv
- 2015–2019: Skala Stryi
- 2019–2020: VIK-Volyn Volodymyr-Volynskyi
- 2020–2021: Shakhtar Donetsk

Senior career*
Years	Team	Apps	(Gls)
2021–	Shakhtar Donetsk	6	(0)
2023–2024	→ Metalist 1925 Kharkiv (loan)	22	(1)
2026	→ Kudrivka (loan)	10	(0)
2026	→ Chornomorets Odesa (loan)	7	(0)

International career^{‡}
2021–2022	Ukraine U19	5	(0)
2022	Ukraine U21	2	(0)
2024	Ukraine U23	1	(0)
- * Club domestic league appearances and goals as of 17 October 2026 ‡ National team caps and goals as of 19 June 2025

Maryan Ivanovych Faryna (Ukrainian: Мар'ян Іванович Фарина; born 28 August 2003) is a Ukrainian professional footballer who plays as a centre-back for Ukrainian club Chornomorets Odesa, on loan from Shakhtar Donetsk.

== Club career ==
Born in Kamyane, Lviv Oblast, Faryna began his career in the neighbouring Youth Sportive School Zhydachiv, before transferring to the Skala Stryi, VIK-Volyn Volodymyr-Volynskyi academy school systems and Shakhtar Donetsk academy in summer 2020.

He played in the Ukrainian Premier League Reserves for several seasons and made his debut for the senior Shakhtar Donetsk squad in the Ukrainian Premier League as a start squad player in an away lost from Vorskla Poltava on 4 June 2023.

On 19 February 2026, he was loaned to Kudrivka until the end of the season.

On 31 July 2026, Faryna was loaned to Chornomorets Odesa until the end of the season. As a player for Chornomorets, he made his debut against Polissya Zhytomyr on 2 August 2026.

== International career ==
On 6 March 2024, Faryna was called up by Ruslan Rotan to the Ukraine Olympic football team preliminary squad as a preparation to the 2024 Summer Olympics.

== Career statistics ==
As of match played 6 June 2026

Appearances and goals by club, season and competition
Club	Season	League			Cup		Europe		Other		Total	
Club	Season	Division	Apps	Goals	Apps	Goals	Apps	Goals	Apps	Goals	Apps	Goals
Shakhtar Donetsk	2022–23	Ukrainian Premier League	1	0	0	0	0	0	—		1	0
Shakhtar Donetsk	2023–24	Ukrainian Premier League	1	0	0	0	0	0	—		1	0
Shakhtar Donetsk	2024–25	Ukrainian Premier League	4	0	1	0	1 (Note: Appearances in UEFA Conference League)	0	—		6	0
Shakhtar Donetsk	Total		6	0	1	0	1	0	—		8	0
Metalist 1925 Kharkiv (loan)	2023–24	Ukrainian Premier League	22	1	1	0	—		0	0	23	1
Kudrivka (loan)	2025–26	Ukrainian Premier League	10	0	0	0	0	0	1	0	11	0
Kudrivka (loan)	Total		10	0	0	0	0	0	1	0	11	0
Career total			38	1	2	0	1	0	1	0	42	1

== Honours ==
Shakhtar Donetsk

- Ukrainian Premier League: 2022–23, 2023–24
- Ukrainian Cup: 2023–24, 2024–25
