= Jair Collahuazo =

Ecuadorian footballer (born 2006)

Personal information
- Full name: Jair Antonio Collahuazo Vaca
- Date of birth: 21 January 2006 (age 20)
- Place of birth: Esmeraldas, Ecuador
- Height: 1.96 m (6 ft 5 in)
- Position: Centre-back

Team information
- Current team: Al Taawoun (on loan from Kudrivka)

Youth career
- Emelec

Senior career*
Years	Team	Apps	(Gls)
2023–2026	Emelec	0	(0)
2024–2026	→ New York Red Bulls II (loan)	34	(1)
2026–	Kudrivka	9	(0)
2026–	→ Al Taawoun (loan)	0	(0)

International career^{‡}
2022–2023	Ecuador U17	15	(0)
2024–	Ecuador U20	2	(1)
- * Club domestic league appearances and goals as of 14 May 2026 (UTC) ‡ National team caps and goals as of 20 December 2024 (UTC)

Jair Antonio Collahuazo Vaca (born 21 January 2006) is an Ecuadorian professional footballer who plays as a central defender for Taawoun on loan from Kudrivka.

== Club career ==
=== Emelec ===
Born in Esmeraldas, Collahuazo began his career in the youth academy of Emelec. Collahuazo's first team debut with Emelec was postponed due to a call-up for a microcycle with the Ecuador under-17 team in September 2023, with teammate Diogo Bagüí drafted in to cover for an injury crisis instead.

=== New York Red Bulls II ===
On 29 February 2024, it was reported that New York Red Bulls II had acquired Collahuazo on a one-year loan deal with an option to purchase.

=== Kudrivka ===
On 21 March 2026, he signed for Kudrivka in Ukrainian Premier League. On May 21, 2026, he left the team's training camp without permission and has already left Ukraine due to the club's salary arrears, which exceeded two months.

==== Taawoun ====
On 19 August 2026, he was loaned to Taawoun.

== International career ==
Collahuazo was called up to the Ecuador under-17 team for the 2023 South American U-17 Championship, and despite not starting in the first match, established himself as one of Ecuador's key players as the nation finished second place to Brazil.

He was called up again for the 2023 FIFA U-17 World Cup, stating that if his teammates were all focused, they could win the tournament.

== Style of play ==
Initially a midfielder when he began playing football at the age of eight, Collahuazo was converted to a defender during his career, due to his imposing height – standing at 1.96 m. He has named compatriot Piero Hincapié as an inspiration to him, stating that he hopes to follow in the Ecuador international's footsteps.

== Career statistics ==
As of match played 20 August 2026

Appearances and goals by club, season and competition
Club	Season	League			Cup		Europe		Other		Total	
Club	Season	Division	Apps	Goals	Apps	Goals	Apps	Goals	Apps	Goals	Apps	Goals
New York Red Bulls II (loan)	2024	MLS Next Pro	10	0	1	0	0	0	0	0	11	0
New York Red Bulls II (loan)	2025	MLS Next Pro	24	1	0	0	0	0	4	1	28	2
Kudrivka	2025–26	Ukrainian Premier League	9	0	0	0	0	0	0	0	9	0
Taawoun	2026–27	Saudi Pro League	0	0	0	0	0	0	0	0	0	0
Career total			43	1	1	0	0	0	4	1	48	2
