= Oleksandr Kozak =

Ukrainian footballer

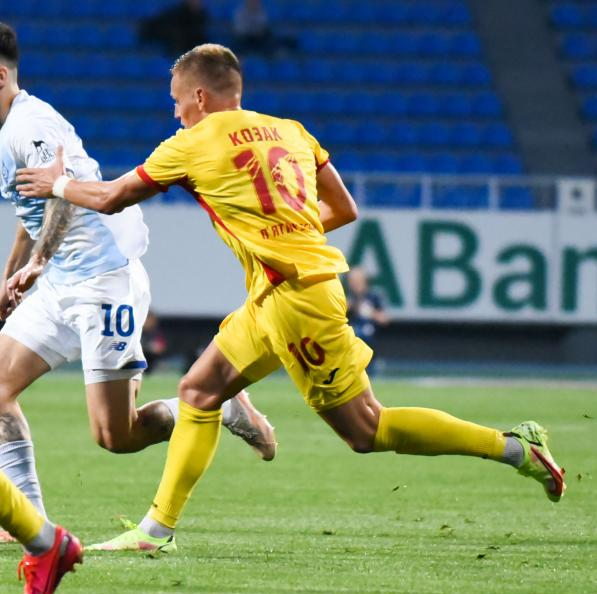
- Kozak playing for Inhulets in 2021

Personal information
- Full name: Oleksandr Serhiyovych Kozak
- Date of birth: 25 July 1994 (age 32)
- Place of birth: Kyiv, Ukraine
- Height: 1.73 m (5 ft 8 in)
- Position: Midfielder

Team information
- Current team: Kudrivka
- Number: 10

Youth career
- 2007–2009: RVUFK Kyiv
- 2009–2010: Monolit Illichivsk
- 2010: Zirka Kyiv
- 2010–2012: UFK Dnipropetrovsk

Senior career*
Years	Team	Apps	(Gls)
2012–2013	Obolon Kyiv	0	(0)
2012	→ Obolon-2 Kyiv	15	(0)
2013–2014	Metalist Kharkiv	0	(0)
2014–2015	Metalurh Donetsk	2	(0)
2015–2017	Stal Kamianske	7	(0)
2016–2017	→ Illichivets Mariupol (loan)	10	(0)
2016–2017	→ Illichivets-2 Mariupol (loan)	7	(0)
2017–2018	Obolon-Brovar Kyiv	28	(1)
2018–2025	Inhulets Petrove	136	(18)
2025–26	Kudrivka	34	(4)
2026-	FC Oleksandriya	12	(1)
- * Club domestic league appearances and goals as of 26 October 2026 @ 17:13(AEST)

Oleksandr Serhiyovych Kozak (Ukrainian: Олександр Сергійович Козак; born 25 July 1994) is a Ukrainian professional footballer who plays as a midfielder for Kudrivka.

== Career ==
In 2014, he signed his first professional contract with FC Metalurh Donetsk.

He made his debut for FC Metalurh Donetsk against FC Hoverla Uzhhorod on 23 May 2015 in the Ukrainian Premier League.

== Honours ==
Inhulets Petrove

- Ukrainian First League: 2019–20
- Ukrainian Cup Runner up 2018–19
