= Mykola Vechurko =

Ukrainian footballer

Personal information
- Full name: Mykola Volodymyrovych Vechurko
- Date of birth: 6 June 1992 (age 34)
- Place of birth: Kyiv, Ukraine
- Height: 1.81 m (5 ft 11 in)
- Position: Midfielder

Team information
- Current team: Kudrivka
- Number: 6

Youth career
- 2002–2007: Youth Sportive School #15 Kyiv
- 2007: Vidradnyi Kyiv
- 2007–2008: Youth Sportive School #15 Kyiv

Senior career*
Years	Team	Apps	(Gls)
2009–2010	Vorskla Poltava	0	(0)
2010–2013	Arsenal Kyiv	6	(0)
2014–2015	Hoverla Uzhhorod	6	(0)
2015	→ Hirnyk-Sport Komsomolsk (loan)	4	(0)
2015–2016	Ahal	1	(0)
2016	Ternopil	8	(0)
2017	Utenis Utena	15	(0)
2017–2018	Sumy	40	(3)
2019–2020	Chaika Petropavlivska Borshchahivka	20	(1)
2021–2022	AFSC Kyiv	26	(1)
2022–2023	Chaika Petropavlivska Borshchahivka	34	(8)
2024	Nyva Buzova	9	(3)
2024–2026	Kudrivka	19	(0)
2025	→ Chaika Petropavlivska Borshchahivka (loan)	14	(7)
2026	Chaika Petropavlivska Borshchahivka	9	(1)
2026–	Kudrivka	5	(0)

International career
2008	Ukraine U16	4	(0)
2010	Ukraine U18	1	(0)
2012	Ukraine U20	1	(0)
- * Club domestic league appearances and goals as of 7 November 2026

Mykola Volodymyrovych Vechurko (Ukrainian: Микола Володимирович Вечурко; born 6 July 1992) is a Ukrainian professional footballer who plays as a midfielder for Kudrivka.

== Career ==
Vechurko is a product of Youth Sportive School #15 Kyiv, where his first trainer was Ruslan Kanavskyi.

Before his debut for FC Arsenal on 20 July 2013, he spent four years for junior teams in the Ukrainian Premier Reserve League.

On 8 March 2017 Vechurko joined A Lyga club Utenis. Midfielder played in 15 out of 16 league games for the Lithuanian side, but was released by the club on 30 June 2017.

In summer 2025 he moved on loan to Chaika in Ukrainian Second League. In October, due to his performance, he was included in the Best XI of Round 12 of the 2025–26 Ukrainian Second League. In January 2026 he signed a full contract with Chaika.

In summer 2026, he moved back to Kudrivka.

== Honours ==
=== Individual ===
- SportArena Player of the Round: 2025-26 (Round 12)
