= Bohdan Kozak =

Ukrainian footballer

Personal information
- Full name: Bohdan Romanovych Kozak
- Date of birth: 29 May 2001 (age 25)
- Place of birth: Mostyska, Ukraine
- Height: 1.79 m (5 ft 10 in)
- Position: Central midfielder

Team information
- Current team: Ahrobiznes Volochysk
- Number: 19

Youth career
- 2011–2013: DYuSSh Mostyska
- 2013–2018: UFK-Karpaty Lviv

Senior career*
Years	Team	Apps	(Gls)
2018–2020	Karpaty Lviv	0	(0)
2020–2021	Karpaty Halych	20	(5)
2021–2025	Nyva Ternopil	48	(7)
2025–	Ahrobiznes Volochysk	35	(2)
- * Club domestic league appearances and goals as of 3 June 2026

Bohdan Romanovych Kozak (Ukrainian: Богдан Романович Козак; born 29 May 2001) is a Ukrainian professional footballer who plays as a central midfielder for Ukrainian club Ahrobiznes Volochysk.
