= Anton Yashkov =

Ukrainian footballer

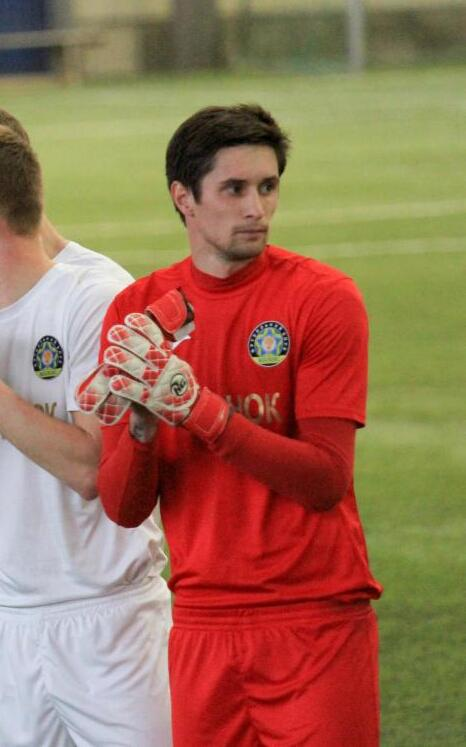

Personal information
- Full name: Anton Petrovych Yashkov
- Date of birth: 30 January 1992 (age 34)
- Place of birth: Bilozerske, Ukraine
- Height: 1.85 m (6 ft 1 in)
- Position: Goalkeeper

Team information
- Current team: Kudrivka
- Number: 37

Youth career
- 2005: UOR Donetsk
- 2006–2007: Shakhtar Donetsk
- 2007–2009: Metalurh Donetsk

Senior career*
| Years | Team | Apps | (Gls) |
| 2009–2015 | Metalurh Donetsk | 0 | (0) |
| 2012 | → Hoverla Uzhhorod (loan) | 1 | (0) |
| 2012–2013 | → Hoverla Uzhhorod (loan) | 0 | (0) |
| 2015 | Bukovyna Chernivtsi | 2 | (0) |
| 2015–2020 | Kolos Kovalivka | 83 | (0) |
| 2020 | → Polissya Zhytomyr (loan) | 3 | (0) |
| 2021–2023 | Polissya Zhytomyr | 6 | (0) |
| 2023–2024 | Zviahel | 20 | (0) |
| 2024– | Kudrivka | 59 | (0) |

International career^{‡}
| 2011 | Ukraine U21 | 1 | (0) |
- * Club domestic league appearances and goals as of 16 November 2026 ‡ National team caps and goals as of 2 March 2026

Anton Petrovych Yashkov (Ukrainian: Антон Петрович Яшков; born 30 January 1992) is a Ukrainian professional footballer who plays as a goalkeeper for Kudrivka.

== International career ==
On 29 March 2011 Yashkov made a debut in games for the Ukraine U-21 in a friendly match against Serbia U-21. He came out on substitution in the second half instead of Mykyta Kryukov and conceded one goal.

== Honours ==
=== Club ===
Polissya Zhytomyr

- Ukrainian First League: 2022–23

Kolos Kovalivka

- Ukrainian Second League: 2015–16

Hoverla Uzhhorod

- Ukrainian Second League: 2011–12

=== Individual ===
- Ukrainian First League Player of the Month: November 2024
