= Denys Svityukha =

Ukrainian footballer

Personal information
- Full name: Denys Oleksandrovych Svityukha
- Date of birth: 8 February 2002 (age 24)
- Place of birth: Maksymilianivka, Ukraine
- Height: 1.86 m (6 ft 1 in)
- Position: Striker

Team information
- Current team: Kudrivka
- Number: 20

Youth career
- 2014–2019: Shakhtar Donetsk

Senior career*
Years	Team	Apps	(Gls)
2019–2023	Shakhtar Donetsk	0	(0)
2021–2022	→ Mariupol (loan)	9	(1)
2022–2023	→ Lleida Esportiu (loan)	24	(1)
2023–2024	Veres Rivne	10	(0)
2025–	Kudrivka	30	(1)
- * Club domestic league appearances and goals as of 24 May 2026

Denys Oleksandrovych Svityukha (Ukrainian: Денис Олександрович Світюха; born 8 February 2002) is a Ukrainian professional footballer who plays as a striker for Kudrivka.

== Career ==
Born in Marinka Raion, Donetsk Oblast, Svityukha is a product of Shakhtar Donetsk academy.

He played in the Ukrainian Premier League Reserves and never made his debut for the senior squad of Shakhtar Donetsk. In July 2021 Svitukha signed a one-year loan contract with Mariupol and made his debut in the Ukrainian Premier League as a substitute player in the losing home match against Zorya Luhansk on 22 August 2021.

In February 2025 he signed for Kudrivka in Ukrainian First League.
