= Anton Hlushchenko =

Ukrainian footballer

Personal information
- Full name: Anton Ihorovych Hlushchenko
- Date of birth: 20 April 2004 (age 22)
- Place of birth: Kharkiv, Ukraine
- Height: 1.85 m (6 ft 1 in)
- Position: Attacking midfielder

Team information
- Current team: Kudrivka (on loan from Shakhtar Donetsk)
- Number: 21

Youth career
- 2013–2017: Metalist Kharkiv
- 2017–2022: Shakhtar Donetsk

Senior career*
Years	Team	Apps	(Gls)
2022–	Shakhtar Donetsk	7	(2)
2022	→ Deportivo Alavés (loan)	0	(0)
2024	→ Vorskla Poltava (loan)	8	(1)
2026	→ Kudrivka (loan)	17	(1)
2026-	→ Zorya Luhansk (Loan)	8	(1)

International career^{‡}
2019	Ukraine U16	2	(0)
2023	Ukraine U19	3	(0)
2025–	Ukraine U21	4	(0)
- * Club domestic league appearances and goals as of 24 May 2026 ‡ National team caps and goals as of 28 May 2026

Anton Ihorovych Hlushchenko (Ukrainian: Антон Ігорович Глущенко; born 20 April 2004) is a Ukrainian professional footballer who plays as an attacking midfielder for Kudrivka, on loan from Shakhtar Donetsk.

== Career ==
Born in Kharkiv, Hlushchenko began his career in the local Metalist Kharkiv academy, before transferring to the Shakhtar Donetsk academy in 2017.

=== Shakhtar Donetsk ===
He played in the Ukrainian Premier League Reserves for several seasons and made his debut for the senior Shakhtar Donetsk squad in the Ukrainian Premier League as a second-half substitute in an away lost from Vorskla Poltava on 4 June 2023.

==== Loan to Vorskla Poltava ====
In March 2024, he moved on loan to Vorskla Poltava.

==== Loan to Kudrivka ====
On 11 February 2026, he was loaned to Kudrivka in Ukrainian Premier League. He played 12 games for Kudrivka, helping the club reach the play-offs with Ahrobiznes Volochysk and earning the right to play in the Ukrainian Premier League next season. In June 2026, Shakhtar coach Arda Turan rejected the player and so Anton began looking for a new team.

== Career statistics ==
As of match played 6 June 2026

Appearances and goals by club, season and competition
Club	Season	League			Cup		Europe		Other		Total	
Club	Season	Division	Apps	Goals	Apps	Goals	Apps	Goals	Apps	Goals	Apps	Goals
Shakhtar Donetsk	2022–23	Ukrainian Premier League	1	0	0	0	0	0	—		1	0
Shakhtar Donetsk	2023–24	Ukrainian Premier League	0	0	0	0	0	0	—		0	0
Shakhtar Donetsk	2024–25	Ukrainian Premier League	4	1	1	0	0	0	—		5	1
Shakhtar Donetsk	2025–26	Ukrainian Premier League	2	1	1	0	2 (Note: Appearances in UEFA Conference League)	0	—		5	1
Shakhtar Donetsk	Total		7	2	2	0	2	0	0	0	11	2
Alavés (loan)	2022–23	La Liga	0	0	0	0	—		—		0	0
Alavés (loan)	Total		0	0	0	0	0	0	0	0	0	0
Vorskla Poltava (loan)	2023–24	Ukrainian Premier League	8	1	1	0	—		—		9	1
Vorskla Poltava (loan)	Total		8	1	1	0	0	0	0	0	9	1
Kudrivka (loan)	2025–26	Ukrainian Premier League	12	0	0	0	0	0	1	0	13	0
Kudrivka (loan)	Total		12	0	0	0	0	0	1	0	13	0
Zorya Luhansk (loan)	2026–27	Ukrainian Premier League	8	1	1	0	0	0	0	0	9	1
Zorya Luhansk (loan)	Total		8	1	1	0	0	0	1	0	9	1
Career total			37	4	4	0	2	0	1	0	41	4

== Honours ==
Shakhtar Donetsk

- Ukrainian Premier League: (3) 2022–23, 2023–24, 2025–26
- Ukrainian Cup: (2) 2023–24, 2024–25
