= Avanhard Stadium (Rivne) =

Sports venue in Rivne, Ukraine

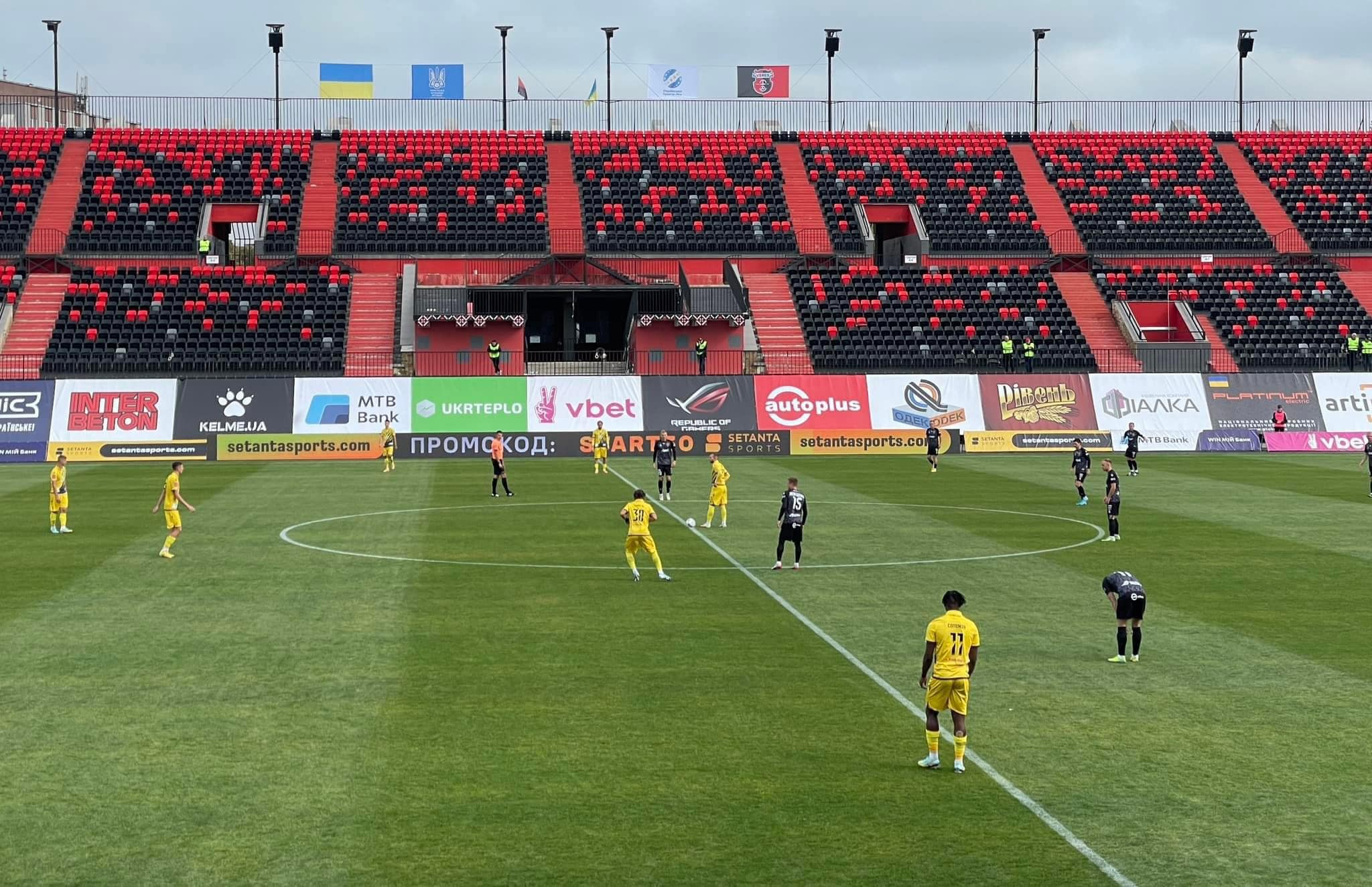
- Interactive map of Avanhard Stadium
- Former names: Sokol Stadium
- Location: Rivne, Ukraine
- Coordinates: 50°36′58″N 26°14′27″E
- Capacity: 4,650 (football)
- Surface: Grass

Construction
- Groundbreaking: 1920s

Tenants
- NK Veres Rivne; Kudrivka since 2026; Epitsentr since 2026; Ukraine national rugby league team

Avanhard Stadium is a multi-use stadium in Rivne, Ukraine. It is currently used mostly for football matches, and is the home of NK Veres Rivne. Since March 2019 the stadium is closed for reconstruction.

In 2016, the stadium held 4,650 spectators. After the reconstruction, the capacity is planned to be 14,000 spectators.

== History ==
=== Sokół stadium (Polish period) ===
The preceding original stadium was built sometimes in 1920s as part of Polish Sokół sports society where the local Sokół Rowne team played. At first here played games of the Lublin District League and later the Volhynia District League. It had capacity of about 4,000 spectators. The stadium itself was located right next to the Lubomirski Palace in Rivne. After the World War II, the territory of eastern Poland was annexed by the Soviet Union and passed on to the Soviet Ukraine. The stadium was renamed as Avanhard and its capacity was increased to 5,000.

=== Avanhard Stadium ===
In 1960 the local football team Kolhospnyk was granted a status of masters and admitted to the Soviet Class B competitions for the Ukrainian SSR. The stadium was closed down for a complete reconstruction and reopened sometime in 1970 reaching its capacity to 25,000 spectators. During that time Kolhospnyk and later Horyn and Avanhard played at the smaller adjacent field right next to the stadium. In 1980s Avanhard Stadium was among the best in the republic. Following dissolution of the Soviet Union, Veres reached the Vyshcha Liha (top division) and the stadium was filled to the maximum almost at every game.

Sometimes in 1990s seats at the stadium were replaced with plastic seats and the stadium's capacity fell to 20,000. In 2002, the city authorities tried to renovate the stadium, but the project was not finished due to lack of funds. Since then the capacity of Avanhard is 4,500 spectators. In 2011, the main club of Rivne Oblast Veres Rivne was disbanded due to bankruptcy.

In 2013 there was a project for complete restructuring of the stadium, but was never realized.

In 2015 on the efforts of local community and activists the NK Veres Rivne was revived as People's Club (Narodnyi Klub). Since being promoted to the Ukrainian Premier League in 2017, NK Veres Rivne was required to upgrade the stadium to premier league requirements, meanwhile playing in Lviv. The club administration presented the league with a draft of the stadium's renovations, yet there were some issues to have that approved. After sometime of uncertainty and some public pressure, the plan was finally approved in February 2018. The Rivne city authority received a written permission from the Ministry of regional development, construction, and communal living where the Ministry waived the requirement to increase amount of parking lot spaces near the stadium to 700, yet it urged the local authorities to allot the required parking from the adjacent areas around the stadium. According to the new plan, which was presented back in April 2017, the new stadium capacity will be 13,466 spectators. In 2017, reconstruction of the stadium was suspended, but in beginning of 2019 it was announced again about revived process of reconstruction and to be completed sometime in 2021. In 2020, the first steps of the reconstruction of the stadium began. In February 2021 the old stadium was demolished and is now in full reconstruction.

The main city's football club Veres since 2017 plays away from Rivne, at first in Varash (former Kuznetsovsk) and after being promoted to the premiers in Lviv. After the club's interleague swap with FC Lviv, Veres returned to Rivne Oblast playing in Mlyniv. On September 30, 2022, for the first time in 5 years, the Rivne football club Veres played a match at the Avangard Stadium.

In 2026 the club Kudrivka announced that will play its home games in Avanhard.

== Gallery ==
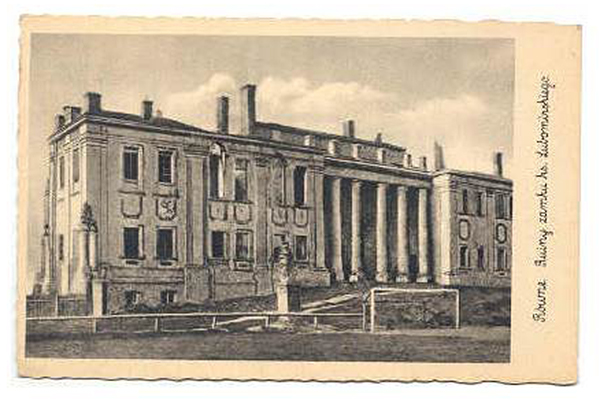
a goal post on the Sokol Stadium in front of Lubomirski Palace in Rowno

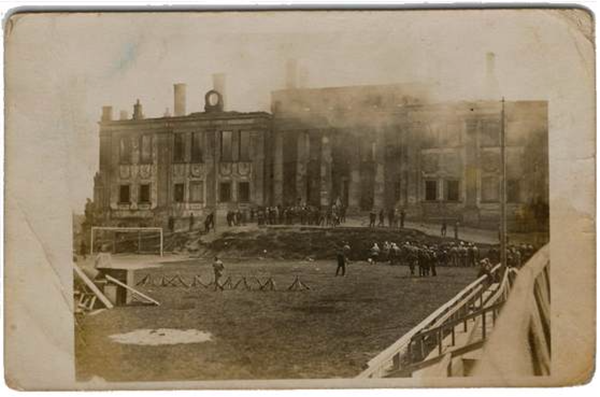
Lubomirski Palace from the view of the stadium's stand

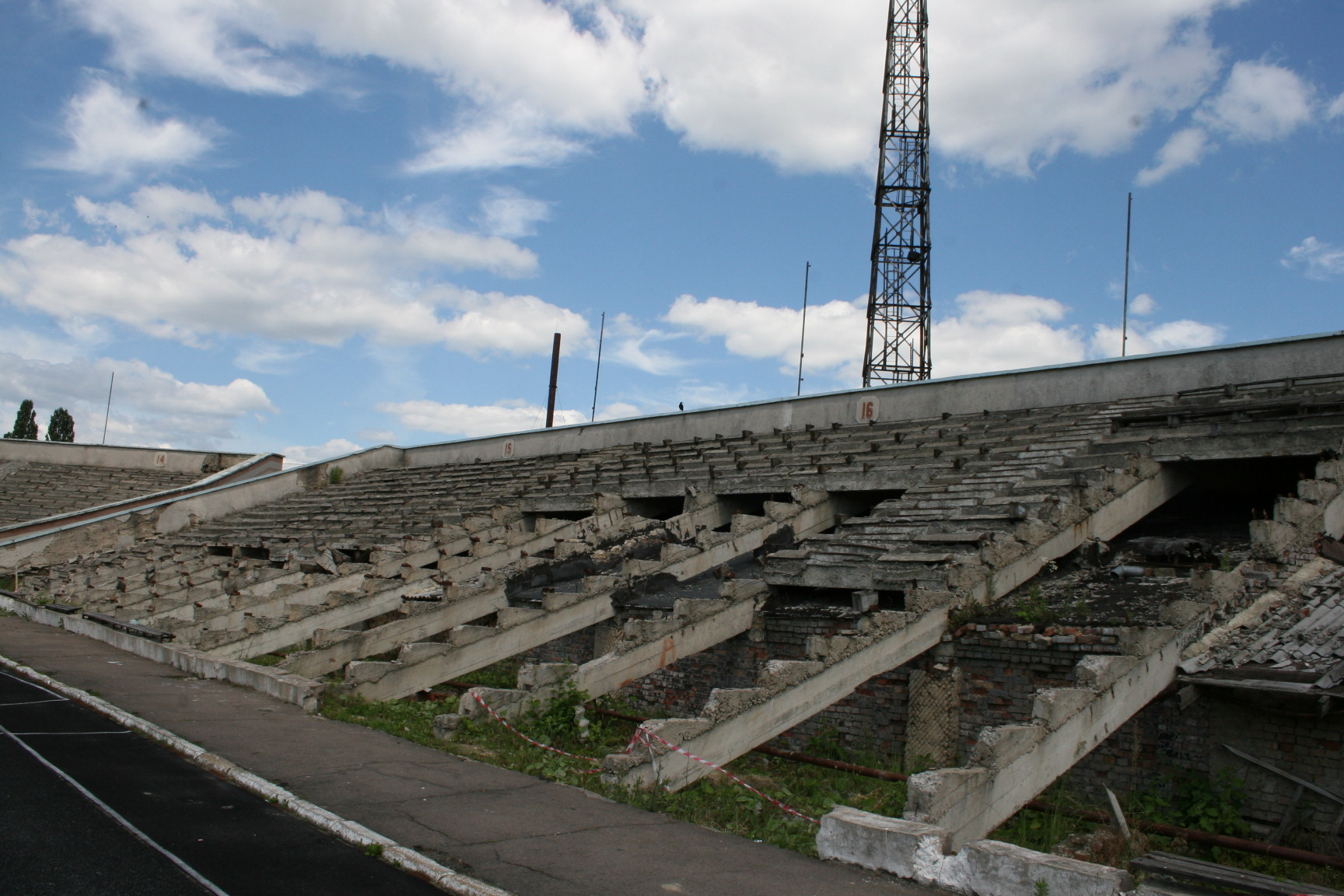
Ruins of some of stands in 2015
