= Bohdan Veklyak =

Ukrainian footballer

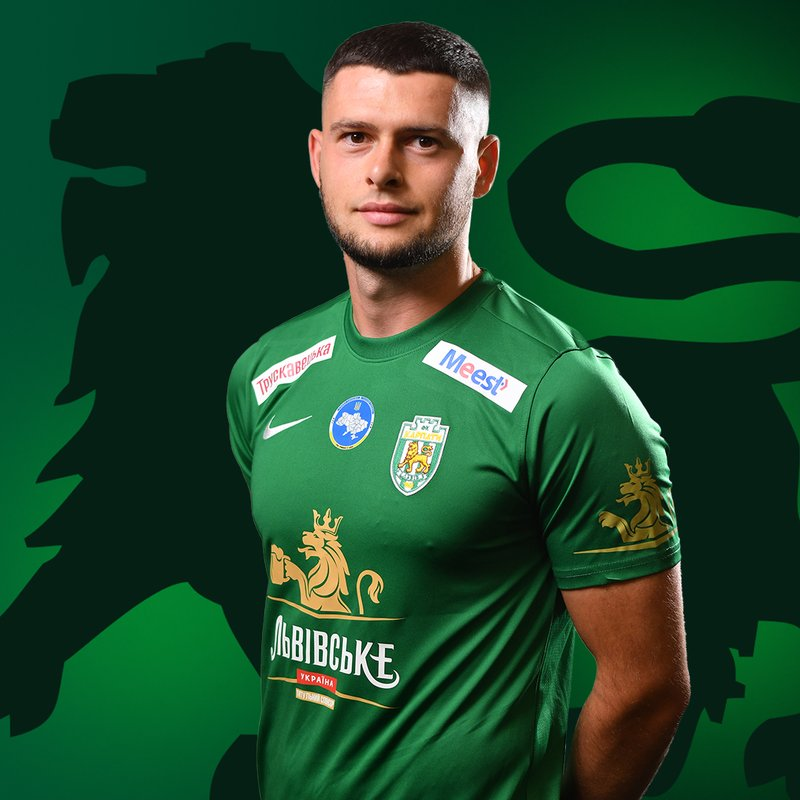

Personal information
- Full name: Bohdan Ihorovych Veklyak
- Date of birth: 31 August 1999 (age 27)
- Place of birth: Zhydachiv, Ukraine
- Height: 1.85 m (6 ft 1 in)
- Position: Centre-back

Team information
- Current team: Kudrivka
- Number: 22

Youth career
- 2012–2013: Mykolaiv
- 2013–2016: Skala Morshyn

Senior career*
Years	Team	Apps	(Gls)
2016–2018	Skala Stryi	0	(0)
2018–2020	Karpaty Lviv	0	(0)
2020	Hirnyk-Sport Horishni Plavni	21	(1)
2021	Olimpik Donetsk	4	(0)
2021–2022	Mynai	10	(0)
2022–2023	Metalurh Zaporizhzhia	16	(1)
2023–2025	Karpaty Lviv	11	(1)
2025–	Kudrivka	16	(1)
- * Club domestic league appearances and goals as of 24 May 2026

Bohdan Ihorovych Veklyak (Ukrainian: Богдан Ігорович Векляк; born 31 August 1999) is a Ukrainian professional footballer who plays as a centre-back for Kudrivka.

== Career ==
Veklyak, born in Zhydachiv, is a product of the neighbouring Mykolaiv sportive school and after continued his youth career in the Skala Morshyn youth sportive system.

After playing in the different Ukrainian First League and Ukrainian Premier League Reserves teams, he signed a 2,5 years deal with the Ukrainian Premier League Olimpik Donetsk in January 2021.

On 30 July 2025 he signed for Kudrivka in Ukrainian Premier League.
