= Artur Dumanyuk =

Ukrainian footballer

Personal information
- Full name: Artur Romanovych Dumanyuk
- Date of birth: 15 November 1996 (age 29)
- Place of birth: Borshchiv, Ukraine
- Height: 1.75 m (5 ft 9 in)
- Position: Defensive midfielder

Team information
- Current team: Kudrivka
- Number: 19

Youth career
- 2009–2010: Karpaty Lviv
- 2010–2014: DVUFK Dnipropetrovsk

Senior career*
Years	Team	Apps	(Gls)
2014	Borshchiv	7	(1)
2015	KAM Burdyakivtsi	0	(0)
2016–2023	Ahrobiznes Volochysk	170	(3)
2022	→ Star Starachowice (loan)	14	(2)
2022–2023	→ KSZO Ostrowiec Świętokrzyski (loan)	13	(0)
2023–2024	UCSA Tarasivka	26	(0)
2024–	Kudrivka	60	(4)
- * Club domestic league appearances and goals as of 13:55, 23 October 2026 (UTC)

Artur Romanovych Dumanyuk (Ukrainian: Артур Романович Думанюк; born 15 November 1996) is a Ukrainian professional footballer who plays as a defensive midfielder for Ukrainian Premier League ckub Kudrivka.

== Career ==
In 2024, Dumanyuk moved to Kudrivka in the Ukrainian First League. On 19 May 2026, he was included in the Best XI of Round 29 of the 2025–26 Ukrainian Premier League.

== Honours ==
KSZO Ostrowiec

- Polish Cup (Świętokrzyskie regionals): 2022–23
