= 2026–27 Ukrainian Premier League =

36th season of top-tier football league in Ukrainian football

Ukrainian Premier League
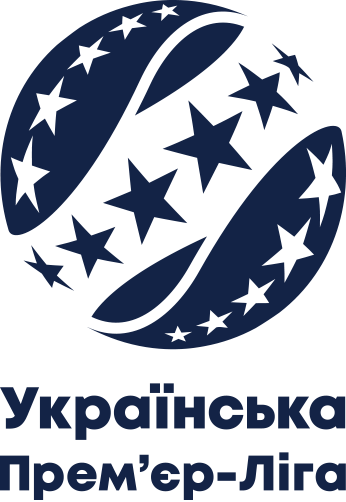
- Betking-themed logo
- Season: 2026–27
- Dates: 31 July 2026 – 4 June 2027; Winter break: December 2026 – February 2027
- Matches: 94
- Goals: 227 (2.41 per match)
- Biggest home win: Shakhtar 5–1 Kudrivka (3 August 2026); Polissya 5–1 Kudrivka (4 September 2026)
- Biggest away win: Kryvbas 1–4 Karpaty (1 August 2026)
- Highest scoring: Shakhtar 5–1 Kudrivka (3 August 2026); Polissya 5–1 Kudrivka (4 September 2026)
- Longest winning run: Shakhtar (5 matches)
- Longest unbeaten run: Polissya (7 matches)
- Longest winless run: Kudrivka (8 matches)
- Longest losing run: Veres (6 matches)
- Highest attendance: 11,200; Karpaty 1–2 Shakhtar (5 September 2026)
- Lowest attendance: 0 (4 matches)
- Total attendance: 166,087
- Average attendance: 1,866
- All statistics correct as of 22 November 2026.

The 2026–27 Ukrainian Premier League season will be the 36th top-level football club competition in Ukraine since the fall of the Soviet Union and the 19th since the establishment of the Ukrainian Premier League (UPL).

Shakhtar Donetsk is the defending champions.

Before the start of the season at the end of May 2026, Puma presented its new 2026–27 match ball, the Stellar Nitro Ultimate, designed specifically for the Ukrainian Premier League. Similar presentations of this product were made for other competitions, including the English Premier League. The Stellar Nitro Ultimate will be replacing the Puma Orbita that was used in the previous two seasons. The Ukrainian Premier League announced signing a two-year agreement for a strategic partnership with Betking. Previously, the company was promoting the LaLiga fixtures broadcast in the Ukrainian market through Megogo.

== Regulation changes ==
For the new season, changes have been made to the foreign player quota: no more than seven players holding foreign passports may be on the pitch simultaneously; however, if the squad includes at least one player with a European Union passport, the limit increases to eight players. The club fee for every foreign footballer is rising from 150,000 to 400,000 hryvnias.

Following the dismissal of a head coach, a club is required to appoint their replacement within 30 days or less. During this interim period, an acting coach holding a license of at least Category A must be appointed.

Clubs are required to play matches at their primary and/or reserve stadiums. Matches may be played at other stadiums: 1) in the event of "force majeure"; or 2) for clubs participating in international competitions, subject to prior written approval from the Committee on Stadiums and Competition Security and the UPL Directorate.

Clubs have the right to reschedule matches, but requests to move a match to a different date must be submitted at least seven calendar days before the scheduled kickoff.

== Teams ==
This season, the Ukrainian Premier League will remain at 16 teams, including last season's UPL top 12 teams, last season's First League top 2 teams, and the 2 winners of the inter-tier (promotion/relegation) play-offs.

=== Promoted teams ===
- Bukovyna Chernivtsi – first-placed team of the 2025–26 Ukrainian First League (returning after 32 years of absence)
- Chornomorets Odesa – second-placed team of the 2025–26 Ukrainian First League (returning after a year of absence)
- Livyi Bereh Kyiv – third-placed team of the 2025–26 Ukrainian First League (returning after a year of absence, relegation play-offs winner)

=== Relegated and withdrawn teams ===
- SC Poltava – relegated after a season in the top flight
- Rukh Lviv – withdrew after six seasons in the top flight
- Oleksandriya – relegated after eleven seasons in the top flight, lose in relegation play-offs

=== Renamed teams ===
On 15 June 2026, FC Metalist 1925 Kharkiv officially changed their name to FC Kharkiv.

=== Location map ===
Home venues of teams in the 2026–27 Ukrainian Premier League.
Several teams (Kharkiv, Shakhtar and Zorya) are playing their home games away from their cities due to ongoing hostilities.
Home venues of teams in the 2026–27 Ukrainian Premier League in Kyiv and Kyiv Oblast
Home venues of teams in the 2026–27 Ukrainian Premier League in Lviv

=== Stadiums ===
The minimum threshold for the stadium's capacity in the UPL is 4,500 (Article 10, paragraph 8.3).

The following stadiums in 2026–27 Ukrainian Premier League are regarded as home grounds:

Rank	Stadium	Place	Club	Capacity	Notes
1	Arena Lviv	Lviv	Shakhtar Donetsk	34,725	used as home ground during the season
2	Stadion Chornomorets	Odesa	Chornomorets Odesa	34,164	
3	Stadion Ukraina	Lviv	Karpaty Lviv	28,051	
3	Stadion Ukraina	Lviv	Bukovyna Chernivtsi	28,051	used as home ground during the season
4	Stadion Dynamo imeni Lobanovskoho	Kyiv	Dynamo Kyiv	16,873	
4	Stadion Dynamo imeni Lobanovskoho	Kyiv	Zorya Luhansk	16,873	used as home ground during the season
5	Stadion Bukovyna	Chernivtsi	Bukovyna Chernivtsi	12,076	(Note: FC Bukovyna Chernivtsi has announced that it will host its first Ukrainian Premier League (UPL) match at its home stadium against FC Chornomorets Odesa in December 2026.)
6	Cherkasy Arena	Cherkasy	LNZ Cherkasy	10,321	
7	Stadion Avanhard	Rivne	Veres Rivne	7,122	
7	Stadion Avanhard	Rivne	FC Kudrivka	7,122	used as home ground during the season
8	Tsentralnyi Stadion	Zhytomyr	Polissya Zhytomyr	5,928	
9	Obolon Arena	Kyiv	Obolon Kyiv	5,103	
10	Stadion Kolos	Kovalivka	Kolos Kovalivka	5,050	
11	Arena Livyi Bereh	Zolocha community	Livyi Bereh Kyiv	4,700	
11	Arena Livyi Bereh	Zolocha community	FC Kharkiv	4,700	used as home ground during the season
12	Stadion Hirnyk	Kryvyi Rih	Kryvbas Kryvyi Rih	3,219	
13	Stadion imeni Tonkocheyeva	Kamianets-Podilskyi	Epitsentr Kamianets-Podilskyi	2,587	
13	Stadion imeni Tonkocheyeva	Kamianets-Podilskyi	Bukovyna Chernivtsi	2,587	used as home ground in 5 matches

Unlike clubs like FC Kharkiv, Shakhtar and Zorya, which are forced to play away from their home stadiums due to proximity to the open combat area, Kudrivka and Bukovyna do not have qualified stadiums.

=== Personnel and sponsorship ===
Team	President	Head coach	Captain	Kit manufacturer	Shirt sponsor
Bukovyna Chernivtsi	Andriy Safronyak	(Ukraine) Serhiy Shyshchenko	(Ukraine) Bohdan Boychuk	Nike	Dmart
Chornomorets Odesa	Oleksandr Hranovskyi	(Ukraine) Roman Hryhorchuk	(Ukraine) Vladyslav Klymenko	Kelme	BETON
Dynamo Kyiv	Ihor Surkis	(Poland) Maciej Kędziorek (caretaker)	(Ukraine) Vitaliy Buyalskyi	New Balance	GG.BET
Epitsentr Kamianets-Podilskyi	Ivan Chernonoh	(Ukraine) Serhiy Nahornyak	(Ukraine) Vladyslav Moroz	Macron	Епіцентр, Intersport
Karpaty Lviv	Volodymyr Matkivskyi	(Spain) Fran Fernández	(Moldova) Vladyslav Babohlo	Nike	80th Air Assault Brigade
Kolos Kovalivka	Andriy Zasukha	(Ukraine) Ruslan Kostyshyn	(Ukraine) Andriy Tsurikov	Nike	Svitanok
Kryvbas Kryvyi Rih	Kostyantyn Karamanits	(Ukraine) Oleksandr Petrakov	(Ukraine) Volodymyr Vilivald	SKIDAN	Rudomain
FC Kudrivka	Roman Solodarenko	(Ukraine) Oleksandr Protchenko (Note: Yevhen Zadorozhnyi is listed as the head coach on the UPL website.)	(Ukraine) Anton Yashkov	Kelme	betking
Livyi Bereh Kyiv	Mykola Lavrenko	(Ukraine) Oleksandr Ryabokon	(Ukraine) Yevhen Banada	Nike	Метало Гальва Україна
LNZ Cherkasy	Viktor Kravchenko	(Ukraine) Vitaliy Ponomaryov	(Ukraine) Nazariy Muravskyi	Macron	teviita
FC Kharkiv	Bohdan Boyko	(Croatia) Mladen Bartulović	(Ukraine) Ivan Kalyuzhnyi	Adidas	Whitebit
Obolon Kyiv	Oleksandr Slobodian	(Ukraine) Oleksandr Antonenko (interim)	(Ukraine) Oleh Slobodyan	Jako	Obolon
Polissya Zhytomyr	Hennadiy Butkevych	(Ukraine) Ruslan Rotan	(Ukraine) Ruslan Babenko	Nike	BGV Group
Shakhtar Donetsk	Rinat Akhmetov	(Turkey) Arda Turan	(Ukraine) Mykola Matviyenko	Puma	SCM, BETON
Veres Rivne	Ivan Nadieyin	(Ukraine) Oleh Shandruk	(Ukraine) Ihor Kharatin	Kelme	betking
Zorya Luhansk	Yevhen Heller	(Ukraine) Viktor Skrypnyk	(Ukraine) Pylyp Budkivskyi	Puma	Without sponsor

=== Managerial changes ===
Team	Outgoing manager	Manner of departure	Date of vacancy	Table	Incoming manager	Date of appointment
Dynamo Kyiv	(Ukraine) Ihor Kostyuk	Sacked	18 October 2026	3rd	(Poland) Maciej Kędziorek (caretaker)	18 October 2026
Kryvbas Kryvyi Rih	(Netherlands) Patrick van Leeuwen	Mutual consent	24 October 2026	16th	(Ukraine) Oleksandr Petrakov	24 October 2026

== League table ==
Pos	Team	Pld	W	D	L	GF	GA	GD	Pts	Qualification or relegation
1	Shakhtar Donetsk	13	9	3	1	23	6	+17	30	Qualification for the Champions League second qualifying round
2	Polissya Zhytomyr	11	9	1	1	25	8	+17	28	Qualification for the Conference League second qualifying round
3	Dynamo Kyiv	12	8	2	2	20	11	+9	26	Qualification for the Conference League second qualifying round
4	Karpaty Lviv	12	6	4	2	23	8	+15	22	Qualified for the Quarter-finals UC
5	Kharkiv	10	7	0	3	19	9	+10	21	Qualified for the Quarter-finals UC
6	LNZ Cherkasy	11	5	3	3	12	10	+2	18 (Note: Ranked on head-to-head points: LNZ Cherkasy 3, Zorya Luhansk 0)	
7	Zorya Luhansk	13	5	3	5	14	16	−2	18	
8	Bukovyna Chernivtsi	13	3	7	3	14	14	0	16	
9	Kolos Kovalivka	11	4	3	4	15	15	0	15	
10	Livyi Bereh Kyiv	12	1	7	4	8	13	−5	10 (Note: Ranked on head-to-head points: Livyi Bereh Kyiv 3,Epitsentr Kamianets-Podilskyi 0)	
11	Epitsentr Kamianets-Podilskyi	12	2	4	6	11	16	−5	10	Qualified for the Quarter-finals UC
12	Chornomorets Odesa	11	2	3	6	8	13	−5	9 (Note: Ranked on head-to-head points: Chornomorets Odesa 3, Veres Rivne 0)	
13	Veres Rivne	13	2	3	8	8	21	−13	9	Qualification for the Relegation play-off
14	Obolon Kyiv	12	1	5	6	7	22	−15	8	Qualification for the Relegation play-off
15	Kudrivka	12	2	2	8	12	29	−17	8	Relegation to Ukrainian First League
16	Kryvbas Kryvyi Rih	10	1	4	5	8	16	−8	7	Relegation to Ukrainian First League

Updated to match(es) played on 21 November 2026. Source: upl.ua
Rules for classification: 1) Points; 2) Head-to-head points; 3) Head-to-head goal difference; 4) Head-to-head goals scored; 5) Goal difference; 6) Goals scored; 7) Draw or "Golden match" if two teams are tied for title (Article 22, paragraph 3).

== Results ==
Teams play each other twice on a home and away basis.

Home \ Away	BUK	CHO	DYN	EPC	KAR	KOL	KRY	KUD	LBK	LNZ	KHA	OBL	PZH	SHA	VER	ZOR
Bukovyna		6/12	3–0			1–1	0–0			0–0		0–0	2–2			1–1
Chornomorets				23/11	0–0	ppd (Note: The match has been postponed due to damage sustained by the stadium during a missile strike on the city of Odesa on August 7. A new date will be determined later.)	1–0		0–0		1–2	1–1	1–2			
Dynamo		28/11		3–0	1–0	2–1		3–1	2/12 (Note: The match has been rescheduled due to Dynamo's participation in European competition qualifiers.)	0–0	6/12	4–2		a		
Epitsentr	0–0						1–1		0–2	29/11	1–2	3–0		0–2	0–0	
Karpaty	3–0			2–2				5–0		3–0		5/12	29/11	1–2	1–1	1–0
Kolos				3–1	0–2						2–1	0–0	9/12 (Note: The match has postponed to an indefinite date. The UPL made this decision due to prolonged air raid alerts in Boryspil district Kievan oblast.)			
Kryvbas			0–2		1–4	2–2		ppd (Note: The match has postponed to an indefinite date after interrupting in the 1st half with the score 0:1. The UPL made this decision due to prolonged air raid alerts in Kryvyi Rih.)	1–1	0–3	25/11 (Note: The match has postponed to an indefinite date. The UPL made this decision due to prolonged air raid alerts in Kryvyi Rih.)				29/11	
Kudrivka	4–1	1–0		0–3		2–3					30/11	0–0				
Livyi Bereh	0–3 (Note: The match was interrupted with the score 0:1 after the first half, the replay in the second half is scheduled for November 1, 12:00 AM. After prolonged raid alert in Kievan oblast, the match was postponed again to November 14.)				1–1	27/11		0–0		0–0						1–3
LNZ		2–0				5/12		2–1			ppd (Note: The match has postponed to an indefinite date. The UPL made this decision due to prolonged air raid alerts in Cherkasy oblast.)	3–1	23/11		0–1	
Kharkiv	2–0				9/12 (Note: The match was interrupted with the score 1:2 in the second half. After prolonged raid alert in Kievan oblast, the match was postponed to the later date.)				2–1			5–0		0–1	1–0	
Obolon							9/12 (Note: The match was interrupted with the score 1:0 after the first half of the match, the replay has been scheduled to the later date. The UPL made this decision due to prolonged air raid alerts in Kyiv.)		1–1						2–0	28/11
Polissya			3–1	5/12			1–0	5–1	1–0		3–1	3–0			2–0	1–2
Shakhtar	30/11	2–0	0–0			2–1	4/12	5–1	1–1	3–0		2–0	0–2			0–0
Veres	1–3	1–3	1–2			0–2		2–1 (Note: The match has postponed to October 3. The UPL made this decision due to prolonged air raid alerts in Rivne.)	7/12					0–3		1–1
Zorya		2–1	0–2	1–0		2–0	1–3	7/12		1–2	0–3 (Note: The match was interrupted with the score 0:1 in the 51st minute, the replay is scheduled for August 31, 1:00 PM.)					

Updated to match(es) played on 22 November 2026. Source: UPL calendar
Legend: Blue = home team win; Yellow = draw; Red = away team win.
For upcoming matches, an "a" indicates there is an article about the rivalry between the two participants.

=== Matches affected by air raid alerts ===
Round 1
Kryvbas vs Karpaty. The match was interrupted in the 73rd minute for 57 minutes.
Round 2
Livyi Bereh vs Kudrivka. The match was delayed for 140 minutes and then was interrupted in the 17th minute for 79 minutes.
Round 3
Kryvbas vs Livyi Bereh. 2nd half of the match was delayed for 113 minutes.
Round 4
Kolos vs Obolon. The match was interrupted in the 76th minute for 150 minutes.
Livyi Bereh vs Karpaty. The match was delayed for 50 minutes. Second half of the match was delayed for 99 minutes and later was interrupted in the 75th minute for 14 minutes.
Chornomorets vs Kryvbas. The match was delayed for 15 minutes.
LNZ vs Veres. The match was interrupted a few times: in the 29th minute for 41 minute; in the 78th minute for 121 minute; in the 82nd minute for 135 minutes.
Zorya vs Kharkiv. The match was interrupted a few times: in the 19th minute for 86 minutes; in the 51st minutes was postponed to the next day and then was interrupted again in the 87th minute for 6 minutes.
Round 5
Chornomorets vs Livyi Bereh. The match was delayed for 35 minutes
Polissya vs Kudrivka. Second half of the match was delayed
Kharkiv vs Obolon. The match was interrupted in the 88th for 161 minute
Round 7
Chornomorets vs Obolon. The match was delayed for 15 minutes and then interrupted a few times: in the 12th minute for 27 minutes; in the 37th minute for 42 minutes; in the 66th minute for 63 minutes
Polissya vs Kryvbas. The match was delayed for 35 minutes
Kharkiv vs Bukovyna. The match was interrupted in the 57th minute for 16 minutes
Kudrivka vs Kolos. The match was interrupted in the 24th minute for 33 minutes
Round 8
Kolos vs Epitsentr. The match was interrupted a few times: start was delayed for 40 minutes, in 13:40 EET and finished only in 7,5 hours.
Obolon vs Kryvbas. The match was delayed for 45 minutes and the interrupted after first half for another date due the prolonged raid alerts in Kyiv.
Dynamo vs Karpaty. The match was delayed for 15 minutes.
LNZ vs Kudrivka. The match was delayed for 15 minutes.
Bukovyna vs Polissya. The match was interrupted in the 36th minute for 93 minutes.
Livyi Bereh vs Zorya. The match was delayed for 50 minutes.
Round 9
Polissya vs Dynamo. The match was interrupted in the 34th minute for 39 minutes and later again in the 90+1st minute for 81 minute.
Kryvbas vs LNZ. The match was delayed for 30 minutes and then was interrupted in the 77th minute for 76 minutes.
Kharkiv vs Livyi Bereh. The match was interrupted in the 13th minute for 5 minute and later again in the 80th minute for 7 minutes.
Round 10
Livyi Bereh vs LNZ. The match was interrupted in the 75th minute for 112 minutes.
Polissya vs Obolon. The match was interrupted in the 78th minute for 56 minutes.
Veres vs Kolos. The match was delayed for 60 minutes and finished only in 3 hours.
Bukovyna vs Kryvbas. The match was interrupted in the 74th minute for 78 minutes.
Round 11
Zorya vs Epitsentr. Second half was delayed for 65 minutes and later was interrupted in the 69th minute for 65 minutes.
Kryvbas vs Dynamo. The match was delayed for 20 minutes and later was interrupted in 74th minute for 49 minutes.
Livyi Bereh vs Bukovyna. The match was started 31st October and was delayed after first half to 1st November, but was postponed due the prolonged raid alert in Kyiv region to the later date.
LNZ vs Kharkiv. The match was not started due the prolonged raid alert in Cherkasy region and was postponed to the later date.
Kolos vs Polissya. The match was not started due the prolonged raid alert in Kyiv region and was postponed to the later date.
Round 12
Polissya vs Veres. The match was interrupted in the 59th minute for 31 minutes.
Kharkiv vs Karpaty. The match was delayed for 5 minute and was postponed after prolonged raid alert in Kyiv region to the later date. The game was interrupted in 47th minute.
Zorya vs LNZ. The match was interrupted in the 10th minute for 23 minutes.

=== Match results by week ===
Team ╲ Round	1	2	3	4	5	6	7	8	9	10	11	12	13	14	15	16	17	18	19	20	21	22	23	24	25	26	27	28	29	30
Bukovyna	D	D	L	W	D	D	L	D	L	D	W	D	W																	
Chornomorets	L	-	L	W	D	L	D	L	L	D	W	L																		
Dynamo	-	W	W	L	D	W	W	W	L	W	W	D	W																	
Epitsentr	W	L	D	W	D	L	L	L	D	L	L	D																		
Karpaty	W	W	W	D	L	W	D	L	D	D	W	-	W																	
Kolos	L	-	L	D	D	L	W	W	L	W	-	D	W																	
Kryvbas	L	W	D	L	D	-	L	-	L	D	L	D	-																	
Kudrivka	L	D	D	L	L	L	L	L	W	L	L	W	-																	
Kharkiv	W	L	L	W	W	-	W	W	W	W	-	-	L																	
Livyi Bereh	-	D	D	D	D	L	W	L	L	D	L	D	D																	
LNZ	D	L	W	L	D	W	L	W	W	D	-	W																		
Obolon	L	D	D	D	L	L	D	-	W	L	L	D	L																	
Polissya	W	W	L	W	W	W	W	D	W	W	-	W																		
Shakhtar	W	W	W	L	W	W	W	W	W	D	W	D	D																	
Veres	L	L	D	W	D	W	D	L	L	L	L	L	L																	
Zorya	W	L	W	L	D	D	L	W	W	D	W	L	L																	

Updated to match(es) played on 21 November 2026. Source: upl.ua
W = Win; D = Draw; L = Loss

=== Position by round ===
Number = One or more less matches played per underline.
Positions are shown as of the end of the round.

Team ╲ Round	1	2	3	4	5	6	7	8	9	10	11	12	13	14	15	16	17	18	19	20	21	22	23	24	25	26	27	28	29	30
Shakhtar	1	2	2	3	2	2	2	1	1	2	1	1																		
Polissya	5	3	5	2	1	1	1	2	2	1	2	2																		
Dynamo	9	6	4	6	6	4	4	3	4	4	3	3	3																	
Karpaty	2	1	1	1	3	3	3	5	5	5	5	5	4																	
Kharkiv	6	7	9	5	4	5	5	4	3	3	4	4																		
LNZ	8	12	8	11	11	7	8	7	6	6	7	6																		
Zorya	4	8	3	7	7	8	9	6	7	7	6	7	7																	
Bukovyna	7	9	13	8	8	9	11	10	11	10	11	8	8																	
Kolos	13	16	15	16	15	15	13	9	10	8	8	9	9																	
Epitsentr	3	5	6	4	5	6	7	11	8	9	10	10																		
Chornomorets	11	14	16	13	13	13	12	13	14	14	9	11																		
Livyi Bereh	10	10	12	12	12	12	10	12	12	12	13	12																		
Veres	12	15	14	9	9	10	6	8	9	11	12	13	13																	
Obolon	15	13	10	14	14	14	15	15	13	13	14	14	14																	
Kudrivka	16	11	11	15	16	16	16	16	15	16	16	15	15																	
Kryvbas	14	4	7	10	10	11	14	14	16	15	15	16	16																	

League leaders/Champions of 2026–27 Ukrainian Premier League/Qualification for the Champions League 2QR
Qualification for Conference League 2QR
Qualification for the Relegation play-offs
Relegation to Ukrainian First League

== Season statistics ==
=== Top goalscorers ===
As of 22 November 2026

Rank	Scorer	Team	Goals Pen.
1	(Ukraine) Ihor Krasnopir	Polissya Zhytomyr	9 (3)
2	(Ukraine) Yan Kostenko	Karpaty Lviv	6 (0)
2	(Kosovo) Baton Zabërgja	Kharkiv	6 (0)
2	(Ukraine) Matviy Ponomarenko	Dynamo Kyiv	6 (1)
5	(Brazil) Alisson Santana	Shakhtar Donetsk	5 (0)
6	(Ukraine) Denys Ndukve	Kolos Kovalivka	4 (0)
6	(Brazil) Fellipe Vieira	Karpaty Lviv	4 (0)
6	(Nigeria) Peter Itodo	Kharkiv	4 (1)
6	(Ukraine) Vladyslav Veleten	Polissya Zhytomyr	4 (1)
6	(Mauritania) Papa Ndiaga Yade	LNZ Cherkasy	4 (1)

First goal of the season:

- (Ukraine national football team) Pylyp Budkivskyi – Zorya vs Kolos (31 July 2026)

Own goals:

- (Portugal national football team) Jimmy Mpanzu – for Zorya vs Kryvbas (9 August 2026)
- (Ukraine national football team) Vyacheslav Surkis – for Bukovyna vs Dynamo (31 August 2026)
- (Ukraine national football team) Artur Dumanyuk – for Polissya vs Kudrivka (4 September 2026)
- (Ukraine national football team) Serhiy Kosovskyi – for Polissya vs Livyi Bereh (13 September 2026)
- (Ukraine national football team) Taras Mykhavko – for Kudrivka vs Dynamo (23 October 2026)
- (Ukraine national football team) Bohdan Veklyak – for Dynamo vs Kudrivka (23 October 2026)
- (Ukraine national football team) Andriy Yakymiv – for Obolon vs Livyi Bereh (6 November 2026)
- (Ukraine national football team) Herman Penkov – for Veres vs Bukovyna (22 November 2026)
- (Ukraine national football team) Oleksiy Sych – for Obolon vs Dynamo (22 November 2026)

=== Hat-tricks ===
As of 2 November 2026

Player	For	Against	Result	Date
(Brazil) Kauã Elias	Shakhtar Donetsk	Kudrivka	5–1 (H)	3 August 2026
(Ukraine) Ihor Krasnopir	Polissya Zhytomyr	Dynamo Kyiv	3–1 (H)	18 October 2026
(Ukraine) Yan Kostenko	Karpaty Lviv	Kudrivka	5–0 (H)	2 November 2026

=== Clean sheets ===
As of 22 November 2026

Rank	Player	Club	Clean sheets
1	(Ukraine) Dmytro Riznyk	Shakhtar Donetsk	8
2	(Ukraine) Heorhiy Bushchan	Polissya Zhytomyr / Dynamo Kyiv	6
2	(Ukraine) Herman Penkov	Bukovyna Chernivtsi	6
4	(Ukraine) Nikita Fedotov	Epitsentr Kamianets-Podilskyi	4
4	(Ukraine) Oleh Kudryk	Polissya Zhytomyr	4
4	(Ukraine) Dmytro Ledviy	LNZ Cherkasy	4
4	(Ukraine) Roman Mysak	Karpaty Lviv	4
4	(Ukraine) Heorhiy Yermakov	Kharkiv	4
4	(Ukraine) Roman Zhmurko	Livyi Bereh Kyiv	4
10	(Nigeria) Chijioke Aniagboso	Chornomorets Odesa	3
10	(Ukraine) Nazariy Fedorivskyi	Obolon Kyiv	3

== Awards ==
=== Monthly awards ===
Month	Player of the Month		Coach of the Month		Ref.
Month	Player	Club	Coach	Club	Ref.
August 2026	(Ukraine) Yan Kostenko	Karpaty Lviv	(Spain) Fran Fernández	Karpaty Lviv	
September 2026	(Ukraine) Nazariy Rusyn	Karpaty Lviv	(Ukraine) Ruslan Rotan	Polissya Zhytomyr	
October 2026	(Ukraine) Ihor Krasnopir	Polissya Zhytomyr	(Ukraine) Ruslan Rotan	Polissya Zhytomyr	
November 2026 December 2026					
February 2027 March 2027					
April 2027					
May 2027					

=== Round awards ===
The list includes winners of the Round by the Ukrainian Premier League as well as the Ukrainian internet publisher "SportArena".

Round	Player			Coach		
Round	Player	Club	Reference	Coach	Club	Reference
Round 1	(Brazil) Alisson Santana (SA)	Shakhtar Donetsk		(Spain) Fran Fernández (SA)	Karpaty Lviv	
Round 1	(Brazil) Kauã Elias (UPL)	Shakhtar Donetsk		(Spain) Fran Fernández (UPL)	Karpaty Lviv	
Round 2	(Ukraine) Kyrylo Barantsov (SA)	Obolon Kyiv		(Ukraine) Ruslan Rotan (SA)	Polissya Zhytomyr	
Round 2	(Panama) Giovany Herbert (UPL)	Kryvbas Kryvyi Rih		(Spain) Fran Fernández (UPL)	Karpaty Lviv	
Round 3	(Ukraine) Danylo Kravchuk (SA)	LNZ Cherkasy		(Ukraine) Viktor Skrypnyk (SA)	Zorya Luhansk	
Round 3	(Brazil) Fellipe Vieira (UPL)	Karpaty Lviv		(Ukraine) Viktor Skrypnyk (UPL)	Zorya Luhansk	
Round 4	(Ukraine) Artem Kozak (SA)	Epitsentr Kamianets-Podilskyi		(Ukraine) Ruslan Rotan (SA)	Polissya Zhytomyr	
Round 4	(Ukraine) Artem Kozak (UPL)	Epitsentr Kamianets-Podilskyi		(Ukraine) Ruslan Rotan (UPL)	Polissya Zhytomyr	
Round 5	(Nigeria) Peter Itodo (SA)	FC Kharkiv		(Croatia) Mladen Bartulović (SA)	FC Kharkiv	
Round 5	(Nigeria) Peter Itodo (UPL)	FC Kharkiv		(Turkey) Arda Turan (UPL)	Shakhtar Donetsk	
Round 6	(Ukraine) Roman Mysak (SA)	Karpaty Lviv		(Ukraine) Ihor Kostyuk (SA)	Dynamo Kyiv	
Round 6	(Ukraine) Andriy Yarmolenko (UPL)	Dynamo Kyiv		(Spain) Fran Fernández (UPL)	Karpaty Lviv	
Round 7	(Kosovo) Baton Zabërgja (SA)	FC Kharkiv		(Ukraine) Oleksandr Ryabokon (SA)	Livyi Bereh Kyiv	
Round 7	(Ukraine) Nazariy Fedorivskyi (UPL)	Obolon Kyiv		(Ukraine) Oleksandr Ryabokon (UPL)	Livyi Bereh Kyiv	
Round 8	(Ukraine) Denys Ndukve (SA)	Kolos Kovalivka		(Ukraine) Viktor Skrypnyk (SA)	Zorya Luhansk	
Round 8	(Ukraine) Heorhiy Bushchan (UPL)	Dynamo Kyiv		(Ukraine) Serhiy Shyshchenko (UPL)	Bukovyna Chernivtsi	
Round 9	(Ukraine) Ihor Krasnopir (SA)	Polissya Zhytomyr		(Ukraine) Ruslan Rotan (SA)	Polissya Zhytomyr	
Round 9	(Ukraine) Ihor Krasnopir (UPL)	Polissya Zhytomyr		(Ukraine) Ruslan Rotan (UPL)	Polissya Zhytomyr	
Round 10	(Ukraine) Ramik Hadzhyiev (SA)	FC Kharkiv		(Ukraine) Ruslan Kostyshyn (SA)	Kolos Kovalivka	
Round 10	(Ukraine) Oleksandr Saputin (UPL)	Zorya Luhansk		(Ukraine) Viktor Skrypnyk (UPL)	Zorya Luhansk	
Round 11	(Ukraine) Andriy Yarmolenko (SA)	Dynamo Kyiv		(Ukraine) Roman Hryhorchuk (SA)	Chornomorets Odesa	
Round 11	(Ukraine) Yan Kostenko (UPL)	Karpaty Lviv		(Ukraine) Roman Hryhorchuk (UPL)	Chornomorets Odesa	
Round 12	(Mauritania) Papa Ndiaga Yade (SA)	LNZ Cherkasy		(Ukraine) Oleksandr Protchenko (SA)	FC Kudrivka	
Round 12	(Mauritania) Papa Ndiaga Yade (UPL)	LNZ Cherkasy		(Ukraine) Vitaliy Ponomaryov (UPL)	LNZ Cherkasy	
Round 13						
Round 14						
Round 15						
Round 16						
winter break
Round 17						
Round 18						
Round 19						
Round 20						
Round 21						
Round 22						
Round 23						
Round 24						
Round 25						
Round 26						
Round 27						
Round 28						
Round 29						
Round 30						

== Relegation play-offs ==
Premier League teams	Agg.	First League teams	1st leg	2nd leg
	x–x			
	x–x			

=== First Semi-final ===
v

v

=== Second Semi-final ===
v

v

== See also ==
- 2026–27 Ukrainian Cup
- 2026–27 Ukrainian First League
- 2026–27 Ukrainian Second League
- 2026–27 Ukrainian Football Amateur League
- 2026–27 Ukrainian Premier League 2 (Under-21)
- 2026–27 Ukrainian Women's Prime League
- List of Ukrainian football transfers summer 2026
- List of Ukrainian football transfers winter 2026–27
