= 2025–26 Ukrainian Premier League =

35th season of top-tier football league in Ukrainian football

Ukrainian Premier League VBET
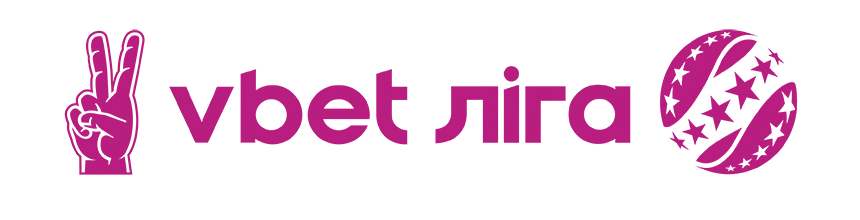
- Official logo
- Season: 2025–26
- Dates: 1 August 2025 – 24 May 2026; Winter break: 15 December 2025 – 19 February 2026
- Champions: Shakhtar Donetsk; 16th Ukrainian league title
- Relegated: Rukh Lviv (withdrew); Poltava; Oleksandriya (play-offs loss)
- Champions League: Shakhtar Donetsk
- Europa League: Dynamo Kyiv
- Conference League: LNZ Cherkasy; Polissya Zhytomyr
- Matches: 240
- Goals: 617 (2.57 per match)
- Top goalscorer: Matviy Ponomarenko (Dynamo) (13 goals)
- Biggest home win: Shakhtar 7–1 Poltava (9 November 2025)
- Biggest away win: Obolon 0–6 Shakhtar (22 November 2025)
- Highest scoring: Kryvbas 5–6 Dynamo (26 April 2026)
- Longest winning run: 7 matches Shakhtar
- Longest unbeaten run: 21 matches Shakhtar
- Longest winless run: 21 matches Oleksandriya
- Longest losing run: 7 matches Poltava
- Highest attendance: 9,850; Epitsentr 0–1 Shakhtar (3 August 2025)
- Lowest attendance: 0 Oleksandriya 0–1 Rukh (30 November 2025)
- Total attendance: 415,911
- Average attendance: 1,733
- All statistics correct as of 24 May 2026.

The 2025–26 Ukrainian Premier League season, referred to as the VBET Ukrainian Premier League for sponsorship reasons, was the 35th top-level football club competition since the fall of the Soviet Union and the 18th since the establishment of the Ukrainian Premier League (UPL).

The season started on 1 August 2025 and ended on 24 May 2026. The UPL clubs decided not to hold the season opening match Ukrainian Super Cup due to the ongoing Russian military aggression against Ukraine.

Dynamo Kyiv were the defending champions, having won their 17th Premier-Liha title and their 30th overall domestic title in the previous season.

== Teams ==
This season, the Ukrainian Premier League remained at 16 teams.

=== Promoted teams ===
- Epitsentr Kamianets-Podilskyi – first-placed team of the 2024–25 Ukrainian First League (debut)
- SC Poltava – second-placed team of the 2024–25 Ukrainian First League (debut)
- Metalist 1925 Kharkiv – third-placed team of the 2024–25 Ukrainian First League, winner in relegation play-off (returning after one-year absence)
- FC Kudrivka – fourth-placed team of the 2024–25 Ukrainian First League, winner in relegation play-off (debut)

=== Relegated teams ===
- Inhulets Petrove – relegated after one season in the top flight
- Chornomorets Odesa – relegated after three seasons in the top flight
- Vorskla Poltava – relegated after twenty-nine seasons in the top flight, lost in relegation play-off
- Livyi Bereh Kyiv – relegated after one season in the top flight, lost in relegation play-off

=== Location map ===
Home venues of teams in the 2025–26 Ukrainian Premier League.
Several teams (Metalist 1925, Shakhtar and Zorya) are playing their home games away from their cities due to ongoing hostilities.

=== Stadiums ===
The minimum threshold for the stadium's capacity in the UPL is 4,500 (Article 10, paragraph 8.3).

The following stadiums in 2025–26 Ukrainian Premier League are regarded as home grounds:

Rank	Stadium	Place	Club	Capacity	Notes
1	Arena Lviv	Lviv	Shakhtar Donetsk	34,725	used as home ground during the season
1	Arena Lviv	Lviv	Rukh Lviv	34,725	
1	Arena Lviv	Lviv	FC Kudrivka	34,725	used as home ground in 1 match
1	Arena Lviv	Lviv	SC Poltava	34,725	used as home ground in 1 match
2	Ukraina Stadium	Lviv	Karpaty Lviv	28,051	
2	Ukraina Stadium	Lviv	Rukh Lviv	28,051	used as home ground in 3 matches
2	Ukraina Stadium	Lviv	SC Poltava	28,051	used as home ground in 1 match
2	Ukraina Stadium	Lviv	Shakhtar Donetsk	28,051	used as home ground in 1 match
3	Lobanovskyi Dynamo Stadium	Kyiv	Dynamo Kyiv	16,873	
3	Lobanovskyi Dynamo Stadium	Kyiv	Zorya Luhansk	16,873	used as home ground during the season
3	Lobanovskyi Dynamo Stadium	Kyiv	SC Poltava	16,873	used as home ground in 1 match
4	Shukhevych Miskyi Stadium	Ternopil	Epitsentr Kamianets-Podilskyi	15,150	used as home ground in 6 matches
5	Berezkin Zirka Stadium	Kropyvnytskyi	SC Poltava	13,305	used as home ground during the season
6	Cherkasy Arena	Cherkasy	LNZ Cherkasy	10,321	
7	Avanhard Stadium	Rivne	Veres Rivne	7,122	
7	Avanhard Stadium	Rivne	Epitsentr Kamianets-Podilskyi	7,122	used as home ground in 1 match
7	Avanhard Stadium	Rivne	FC Kudrivka	7,122	used as home ground in 5 matches
7	Avanhard Stadium	Rivne	Metalist 1925 Kharkiv	7,122	used as home ground in 1 match (Note: The round 15 match Metalist 1925 vs Veres that was scheduled on December 7, 2025, was suspended multiple times and later abandoned on the 20th minute due to electricity issues at the host's, Metalist 1925, stadium)
8	CSC Nika Stadium	Oleksandriya	FC Oleksandriya	7,000	
9	Tsentralnyi Stadium	Zhytomyr	Polissya Zhytomyr	5,928	
9	Tsentralnyi Stadium	Zhytomyr	Metalist 1925 Kharkiv	5,928	used as home ground during the season (Note: FC Livyi Bereh Kyiv terminated the cooperation agreement with the Metalist 1925 due to indecent behavior and obscene statements by Metalist 1925's representatives towards the FC Livyi Bereh)
9	Tsentralnyi Stadium	Zhytomyr	FC Kudrivka	5,928	used as home ground in 1 match
10	Obolon Arena	Kyiv	Obolon Kyiv	5,103	
10	Obolon Arena	Kyiv	FC Kudrivka	5,103	used as home ground during the season
10	Obolon Arena	Kyiv	SC Poltava	5,103	used as home ground in 1 match
10	Obolon Arena	Kyiv	Zorya Luhansk	5,103	used as home ground in 1 match
10	Obolon Arena	Kyiv	Kolos Kovalivka	5,103	used as home ground in 1 match
11	Kolos Stadium	Kovalivka	Kolos Kovalivka	5,050	
11	Kolos Stadium	Kovalivka	Kryvbas Kryvyi Rih	5,050	used as home ground in 1 match
12	Arena Livyi Bereh	Zolocha hromada	Epitsentr Kamianets-Podilskyi	4,700	used as home ground in 8 matches
13	Hirnyk Stadium	Kryvyi Rih	Kryvbas Kryvyi Rih	3,219	

Notes: Unlike clubs like Metalist 1925 Kharkiv, Shakhtar and Zorya, which are forced to play away from their home stadiums due to proximity to the open combat area, while Epitsentr, Kudrivka and Poltava do not have a qualified stadiums.

=== Personnel and sponsorship ===
Team	President	Head coach	Captain	Kit manufacturer	Shirt sponsor
Dynamo Kyiv	Ihor Surkis	(Ukraine) Ihor Kostyuk	(Ukraine) Vitaliy Buyalskyi	New Balance	GG.BET
Epitsentr Kamianets-Podilskyi	Ivan Chernonoh	(Ukraine) Serhiy Nahornyak	(Ukraine) Andriy Bezhenar	Bavovna	Епіцентр
Karpaty Lviv	Volodymyr Matkivskyi	(Spain) Fran Fernández	(Moldova) Vladyslav Babohlo	Nike	Lvivske
Kolos Kovalivka	Andriy Zasukha	(Ukraine) Ruslan Kostyshyn	(Ukraine) Valeriy Bondarenko	Nike	Svitanok
Kryvbas Kryvyi Rih	Kostyantyn Karamanits	(Netherlands) Patrick van Leeuwen	(Ukraine) Maksym Zaderaka	SKIDAN	Rudomain
FC Kudrivka	Roman Solodarenko	(Ukraine) Oleksandr Protchenko	(Ukraine) Anton Yashkov	Kelme	betking
LNZ Cherkasy	Viktor Kravchenko	(Ukraine) Vitaliy Ponomaryov	(Ukraine) Nazariy Muravskyi	Macron	teviita (Note: In the Round 23 match against Shakhtar, LNZ played without the title sponsor logo. Before Round 23 betting company FavBet was the title sponsor)
Metalist 1925 Kharkiv	Bohdan Boyko	(Croatia) Mladen Bartulović	(Ukraine) Ivan Kalyuzhnyi	Puma	Whitebit
Obolon Kyiv	Oleksandr Slobodian	(Ukraine) Oleksandr Antonenko (interim)	(Ukraine) Oleh Slobodyan	Jako	Obolon (Note: Before Round 23 betting company FavBet was the title sponsor)
Oleksandriya	Serhiy Kuzmenko	(Ukraine) Volodymyr Sharan	(Ukraine) Dmytro Myshnyov	Nike	AgroVista
Polissya Zhytomyr	Hennadiy Butkevych	(Ukraine) Ruslan Rotan	(Ukraine) Ruslan Babenko	Nike	BGV Group
SC Poltava	Serhiy Ivashchenko	(Ukraine) Pavlo Matviychenko (interim)	(Ukraine) Vladyslav Danylenko	ARTY	КВП, Poltava Brewery, Insortex
Rukh Lviv	Hryhoriy Kozlovskyi	(Ukraine) Ivan Fedyk	(Ukraine) Denys Pidhurskyi	Kappa	Emily Resort, Auroom, Onur Group
Shakhtar Donetsk	Rinat Akhmetov	(Turkey) Arda Turan	(Ukraine) Mykola Matviyenko	Puma	SCM (Note: Shakhtar Donetsk terminated their relationships with Favbet), BETON (Note: Since 26th matchweek)
Veres Rivne	Ivan Nadieyin	(Ukraine) Oleh Shandruk	(Ukraine) Ihor Kharatin	Buntar	betking
Zorya Luhansk	Yevhen Heller	(Ukraine) Viktor Skrypnyk	(Ukraine) Pylyp Budkivskyi	Puma	Without sponsor (Note: Betting company Prematch was the title sponsor for the first three league matches. After the Ukrainian Cup match and beyond, the club has no title sponsor)

=== Managerial changes ===
Team	Outgoing manager	Manner of departure	Date of vacancy	Table	Incoming manager	Date of appointment
Shakhtar Donetsk	(Netherlands) Marino Pušić	Sacked	24 May 2025	Pre-season	(Turkey) Arda Turan	27 May 2025
LNZ Cherkasy	(Ukraine) Roman Hryhorchuk	Mutual consent	26 May 2025	Pre-season	(Ukraine) Vitaliy Ponomaryov	5 June 2025
FC Oleksandriya	(Ukraine) Ruslan Rotan	End of contract	29 May 2025	Pre-season	(Ukraine) Kyrylo Nesterenko	17 June 2025
Polissya Zhytomyr	(Ukraine) Oleksandr Maksymov (caretaker)	End of caretaker spell	29 May 2025	Pre-season	(Ukraine) Ruslan Rotan	29 May 2025
Kryvbas Kryvyi Rih	(Ukraine) Yuriy Vernydub	End of contract	31 May 2025	Pre-season	(Netherlands) Patrick van Leeuwen	9 June 2025
Rukh Lviv	(Ukraine) Vitaliy Ponomaryov	Mutual consent	4 June 2025	Pre-season	(Ukraine) Ivan Fedyk	11 June 2025 (Note: The appointment of the coach was announced on 11 June 2025, however the official presentation took place on 23 June 2025)
Obolon Kyiv	(Ukraine) Serhiy Shyshchenko	Mutual consent	4 June 2025	Pre-season	(Ukraine) Oleksandr Antonenko (interim) (Note: Serhiy Shyshchenko were to leave the club officially after 16 June 2025, but before 16 June, his assistant, Oleksandr Antonenko, had been interim spell without Shyshchenko)	4 June 2025
Zorya Luhansk	(Croatia) Mladen Bartulović (interim)	End of interim spell & contract	16 June 2025	Pre-season	(Ukraine) Viktor Skrypnyk	16 June 2025
Metalist 1925 Kharkiv	(Ukraine) Oleksandr Chyzhov (caretaker)	End of caretaker spell	20 June 2025	Pre-season	(Croatia) Mladen Bartulović	20 June 2025
SC Poltava	(Ukraine) Volodymyr Sysenko (Note: The coach was absent for health reasons in the 2nd part of the 2024–25 Ukrainian First League. The team was managed by his assistant, Ihor Tymchenko. On 7 December 2025, Sysenko passed away. Later, the president of SC Poltava clarified that provisionally Matviychenko is the acting head coach, but de facto the senior squad is managed by Tymchenko. Tymchenko is expected to take the coaching PRO certification in March of 2026.)	Change of role	29 July 2025	Pre-season	(Ukraine) Pavlo Matviychenko (interim)	29 July 2025
FC Kudrivka	(Ukraine) Vasyl Baranov	Juridical	5 August 2025	1st	(Ukraine) Vitaliy Kostyshyn (interim) (Note: Vitaliy Kostyshyn is the head coach of the U-19 team, but legally he was appointed head coach of the main team, since Vasyl Baranov does not have a UEFA PRO license. However, Vasyl Baranov remains de-facto head coach of the first team.)	5 August 2025
Dynamo Kyiv	(Ukraine) Oleksandr Shovkovskyi	Sacked	27 November 2025	7th	(Ukraine) Ihor Kostyuk (caretaker)	27 November 2025
Dynamo Kyiv	(Ukraine) Ihor Kostyuk (caretaker)	Permanent basis	17 December 2025	4th	(Ukraine) Ihor Kostyuk	17 December 2025
Karpaty Lviv	(Ukraine) Vladyslav Lupashko	Mutual consent	31 December 2025	9th	(Spain) Fran Fernández	8 January 2026
FC Kudrivka	(Ukraine) Vitaliy Kostyshyn (interim)	Resigned	20 February 2026	13th	(Ukraine) Vasyl Baranov	20 February 2026
FC Oleksandriya	(Ukraine) Kyrylo Nesterenko (Note: The official protocols on the UPL website indicated Nesterenko's assistant Yevhen Kalynychenko as the head coach.)	Mutual consent	23 March 2026	15th	(Ukraine) Volodymyr Sharan	23 March 2026
FC Kudrivka	(Ukraine) Vasyl Baranov	Sacked	4 May 2026	13th	(Ukraine) Oleksandr Protchenko	5 May 2025

== League table ==
Pos	Team	Pld	W	D	L	GF	GA	GD	Pts	Qualification or relegation
1	Shakhtar Donetsk (C)	30	22	6	2	71	21	+50	72	Qualification for the Champions League league phase (Note: Shakhtar Donetsk was moved to the Champions League league phase as the champion with the highest club coefficient in the Champions League qualifying rounds, due to re-balancing from the 2025–26 UEFA Champions League winner already qualifying for league phase via their domestic league.)
2	LNZ Cherkasy	30	18	6	6	39	17	+22	60	Qualification for the Conference League second qualifying round
3	Polissya Zhytomyr	30	18	5	7	51	21	+30	59	Qualification for the Conference League second qualifying round
4	Dynamo Kyiv (Note: Dynamo Kyiv is the winner of the 2025–26 Ukrainian Cup)	30	17	6	7	66	36	+30	57	Qualification for the Europa League first qualifying round
5	Metalist 1925 Kharkiv	30	13	12	5	36	19	+17	51	
6	Kolos Kovalivka	30	13	10	7	30	25	+5	49	
7	Kryvbas Kryvyi Rih	30	13	9	8	53	46	+7	48	
8	Zorya Luhansk	30	12	10	8	42	36	+6	46	
9	Karpaty Lviv	30	10	11	9	40	31	+9	41	
10	Epitsentr Kamianets-Podilskyi	30	8	8	14	36	45	−9	32	
11	Veres Rivne	30	7	10	13	26	40	−14	31 (Note: Ranked on head-to-head points: Veres Rivne 4, Obolon Kyiv 1)	
12	Obolon Kyiv	30	7	10	13	28	49	−21	31	
13	Kudrivka (O)	30	7	7	16	32	48	−16	28	Qualification for the Relegation play-off
14	Rukh Lviv (Note: Oleksandriya were selected for the relegation play-offs as the replacement for the withdrawn Rukh Lviv. Officially, Rukh withdrew to concentrate on the youth football only, but rumors had that Rukh Lviv will be competing in the Ukrainian Second League. Later, they were indeed accepted to the Ukrainian Second League.) (W, R)	30	6	3	21	20	51	−31	21	Excluded from the competitions
15	Oleksandriya (R)	30	3	8	19	24	58	−34	17	Qualification for the Relegation play-off
16	Poltava (R)	30	2	7	21	23	74	−51	13	Relegation to Ukrainian First League

Updated to match(es) played on 24 May 2026. Source: upl.ua
Rules for classification: 1) Points; 2) Head-to-head points; 3) Head-to-head goal difference; 4) Head-to-head goals scored; 5) Goal difference; 6) Goals scored; 7) Draw or "Golden match" if two teams tied for title (Article 22, paragraph 3).
(C) Champions; (O) Relegation play-offs winner; (R) Relegated; (W) Excluded from the competitions

== Results ==
Teams play each other twice on a home and away basis.

Home \ Away	DYN	EPC	KAR	KOL	KRY	KDR	LNZ	M25	OBL	OLK	PZH	POL	RUX	SHA	VER	ZOR
Dynamo		4–0	0–1	2–1	4–0	3–2	0–1	1–1	2–1	2–2	4–1	1–2	1–0	1–2	3–0	3–1
Epitsentr	1–4		0–0	4–0	4–5	1–0	0–2	0–0	1–2	1–1	3–2	0–0	2–0	0–1	2–3	1–2
Karpaty	3–3	1–3		0–1	1–0	1–1	0–0	1–2	4–0	2–0	0–2	1–1	0–0	3–3	2–0	1–2
Kolos	2–1	1–0	1–1		2–1	1–0	1–0	0–0	0–2	1–1	0–2	2–0	0–2	0–0	0–0	1–1
Kryvbas	5–6	2–1	1–0	1–1		3–1	0–3	2–0	2–1	3–0	0–1	2–2	3–0	2–3	2–2	3–1
Kudrivka	1–2	2–1	2–2	1–3	1–2		1–0	1–1	1–0	3–1	0–2	3–1	2–1 (Note: The match was postponed on May 14 due to a prolonged air raid alert in Rivne oblast on May 13.)	1–3	0–0	2–2
LNZ	0–0	1–0	0–1	1–0	0–0	1–0		1–1	3–0	2–0	1–3	2–0	1–0	2–2	0–2	2–0
Metalist 1925	1–0	1–1	2–2	1–0	0–0	1–0	0–1		0–0	1–0	0–1	2–0	2–0	1–1	4–0 (Note: The round 15 match Metalist 1925 vs Veres that was scheduled on December 7, 2025, was suspended multiple times and later abandoned on the 20th minute due to electricity issues at the host's, Metalist 1925, stadium. The decision on this match should have been made by the UAF Control and Disciplinary Committee. However, on February 20, 2026, Veres announced that it had agreed to have match postponed, rescheduled and later resumed and played on the club's stadium in Rivne in the spring 2026. All goals were scored in the match at the Avangard Stadium in Rivne.)	1–3
Obolon	2–2	2–2	0–2	0–0	0–0	1–1	0–1	1–3		1–0	0–4	1–1	1–0	0–6	1–1	3–3
Oleksandriya	0–5	0–1	0–2	0–3	1–1	1–1	4–1	1–4	0–3 (Note: The round 17 match Oleksandriya vs Obolon that was scheduled on February 23, 2026, was cancelled due to unsuitable state of the pitch of Oleksandriya's stadium (the pitch was frozen). The decision on this match will be made by the UAF Control and Disciplinary Committee later..On March 5, 2026, the Ukrainian Football Federation (UAF) Control and Disciplinary Committee awarded FC Obolon a technical victory. The UPL has not been rushing to update the competition table regarding the decision, and at the end of April, it considers the match as one that has not been played. Oleksandria's appeal against the UAF Control and Disciplinary Committee's decision was dismissed.)		0–3	1–0	0–1	0–1	0–3	1–2
Polissya	1–2	0–0	3–2	0–1	2–0	2–0	0–2	0–0	3–1	2–1		4–0	2–0	0–0	1–1	2–0
Poltava	0–2	0–3	0–4	2–2	3–3	0–2	0–2	0–2	1–2	3–3	0–4		1–2	0–4	1–0	1–4
Rukh	1–5	0–1	0–3	1–1	1–2	4–2	1–2	0–3	1–2	1–3	1–0	2–1		0–4	0–0	1–2
Shakhtar	3–1	5–0	3–0	0–1	2–2	4–0	1–4	1–0	3–1	2–0	1–0	7–1	3–0		1–0	1–0
Veres	0–1	3–3	0–0	0–1	1–3	2–0	0–3	0–1	2–0	1–1	1–4	3–2	1–0	0–2		0–0
Zorya	1–1	1–0	1–0	1–3	2–3	2–1	0–0	1–1	0–0	2–2	0–0 (Note: Due to the rescheduling of the match between SC Poltava and Dynamo Kyiv to the Valeriy Lobanovskyi Dynamo Stadium, Zorya's match was shifted by two days – from May 16 to May 18.)	4–0	1–0	1–2	2–0	

Updated to match(es) played on 24 May 2026. Source: UPL calendar
Legend: Blue = home team win; Yellow = draw; Red = away team win.
For upcoming matches, an "a" indicates there is an article about the rivalry between the two participants.

=== Matches affected by air raid alerts ===
Round 1
Zorya vs LNZ. The match had been interrupted in the 17th minute for 36 minutes.
Round 2
Poltava vs Veres. The match had been interrupted in the 80th minute for 38 minutes.
Kryvbas vs Metalist 1925. The match had been interrupted in the 24th minute for 38 minutes.
Round 3
Rukh vs Obolon. The match had been interrupted in the 67th minute for 15 minutes.
Kolos vs Karpaty. The match had been interrupted in the 33nd minute for 17 minutes.
Zorya vs Kryvbas. The match had been interrupted in the 63th minute for 17 minutes.
Round 4
Kryvbas vs Obolon. The match was delayed for 20 minutes.
Round 5
Obolon vs Dynamo. The match was delayed for 15 minutes.
Kryvbas vs Polissya. The match was delayed for 30 minutes and then had been interrupted in 2nd minute for 8 minutes.
Round 6
Obolon vs Karpaty. The match had been interrupted in 26th minute for 49 minutes.
Round 8
Kolos vs Rukh. The match was delayed for 60 minutes.
Oleksandriya vs Karpaty. The match had been interrupted in the 9th minute for 41 minutes.
Obolon vs Veres. The match was delayed for 45 minutes.
Round 10
Poltava vs Kolos. The match was delayed for 15 minutes.
Round 11
Kryvbas vs Poltava. The match was delayed for 60 minutes.
LNZ vs Karpaty. The match had been interrupted a few times: in the 26th minute for 39 minutes; in the 49th minite for 31 minutes; in the 90+4th minute for 22 minutes.
Round 12
Oleksandriya vs Polissya. The match was delayed for 20 minutes.
Round 14
Obolon vs Kolos. The match had been interrupted in 44th minute for 45 minutes.
Round 16
Oleksandriya vs Kudrivka. The match was delayed for 27 minutes.
Round 18
LNZ vs Polissya. The match had been interrupted a few times: in 7th minute for 29 minutes and then in 90+2nd minute for 18 minutes.
Round 19
Polissya vs Dynamo.The match had been interrupted in 90+1st minute for 19 minutes.
Round 20
LNZ vs Oleksandriya. The match was delayed for 45 minutes.
Round 22
Poltava vs Oleksandriya. The match was delayed for 49 minutes.
Kryvbas vs LNZ.The match had been interrupted in 13th minute for 45 minutes.
Round 23
Poltava vs Polissya. The match had been interrupted in 85th minute for 5 minutes.
LNZ vs Shakhtar. 2nd half of the match was delayed for 40 minutes.
Round 24
Obolon vs Poltava. The match ended 30 seconds before stoppage time. The air raid siren sounded one minute before the end of the match, in the 90+5 minute.
Round 25
Kryvbas vs Dynamo. The match was delayed for 50 minutes.
Round 26
Poltava vs Kryvbas. The match had been interrupted in 43rd minute for 108 minutes.
Oleksandriya vs Kolos. The match was delayed for 120 minutes. 2nd half of the match was delayed for 165 minutes.
Round 27
Kryvbas vs Karpaty. The match was delayed for 75 minutes.
Round 28
Shakhtar vs Obolon. The match was delayed for 45 minutes. Later it has been interrupted in 17th minute for 50 minutes and again, in 25th minute for 37 minutes.
Round 29
Kryvbas vs Shaktar. The match was delayed for 95 minutes. Later it has been interrupted in 15th minute for 65 minutes.
Kolos vs Obolon. The match had been interrupted in 73rd minute for 21 minutes.
Relegation play-offs 1st leg
Oleksandriya vs Livyi Bereh. The match had been interrupted in 78th minute for 22 minutes.

=== Match results by week ===
Team ╲ Round	1	2	3	4	5	6	7	8	9	10	11	12	13	14	15	16	17	18	19	20	21	22	23	24	25	26	27	28	29	30
Dynamo	W	W	W	W	D	D	D	D	D	W	L	L	L	L	W	W	W	W	W	W	W	L	L	W	W	L	D	W	W	W
Epitsentr	L	L	L	L	W	L	L	L	W	W	L	L	D	D	W	L	L	L	W	W	L	W	L	D	D	D	D	W	D	D
Karpaty	L	D	D	D	D	W	D	W	L	D	W	W	L	D	L	L	L	L	D	W	W	W	W	D	W	D	L	D	W	L
Kolos	W	W	D	W	W	D	L	L	L	D	D	W	W	D	D	D	L	W	L	D	W	D	D	W	W	W	W	L	L	W
Kryvbas	L	W	W	W	L	W	D	W	W	L	D	L	D	D	W	D	D	W	D	L	W	L	W	W	L	D	W	W	L	D
Kudrivka	W	L	W	D	L	L	W	L	D	L	W	L	L	L	L	D	D	W	D	D	L	L	L	L	L	D	L	W	W	L
LNZ	D	W	W	L	L	W	D	W	W	W	L	W	W	W	W	W	W	L	W	W	W	W	D	L	D	D	D	W	L	W
Metalist1925	D	L	W	W	D	W	W	D	D	L	D	L	W	D	W	W	D	W	W	L	W	D	W	W	D	L	D	D	D	W
Obolon	D	W	W	L	D	L	D	D	W	L	L	W	L	D	L	L	W	W	D	L	L	D	L	D	L	D	D	L	W	L
Oleksandriya	L	L	L	L	W	D	W	L	D	L	D	L	D	L	L	D	L	L	L	L	L	D	L	L	D	L	L	L	W	D
Polissya	W	L	L	L	W	W	W	W	D	W	D	W	D	W	L	W	W	W	L	W	W	D	W	L	W	W	W	L	D	W
Poltava	L	W	L	L	D	L	L	L	L	D	D	L	L	W	L	L	L	L	L	L	L	D	L	D	L	D	L	L	L	D
Rukh	W	L	L	L	L	L	L	W	L	D	L	L	W	W	W	W	L	L	L	L	L	L	D	L	L	L	D	L	L	L
Shakhtar	W	D	W	W	D	W	W	L	D	W	W	W	W	D	D	W	W	W	W	W	W	W	D	W	W	W	W	W	W	L
Veres	L	L	L	W	W	D	L	D	D	D	W	W	D	D	L	L	W	L	L	D	L	D	W	W	L	D	D	L	L	L
Zorya	D	W	L	W	L	L	D	W	D	D	W	W	D	L	W	L	D	L	W	D	L	D	W	L	W	W	D	W	D	W

Updated to match(es) played on 24 May 2026. Source: pfl.ua
W = Win; D = Draw; L = Loss

=== Position by round ===
Team ╲ Round	1	2	3	4	5	6	7	8	9	10	11	12	13	14	15	16	17	18	19	20	21	22	23	24	25	26	27	28	29	30
Shakhtar	5	3	2	2	3	2	1	1	2	1	1	1	1	1	2	2	2	1	1	1	2	2	2	1	1	1	1	1	1	1
LNZ	10	6	3	8	8	6	7	6	4	3	3	2	2	2	1	1	1	2	2	2	1	1	1	2	2	2	3	2	2	2
Polissya	2	9	10	10	11	7	6	4	5	4	4	3	3	3	3	3	3	3	3	3	3	3	3	3	3	3	2	3	3	3
Dynamo	6	1	1	1	1	1	2	2	3	2	2	4	7	7	6	4	4	4	4	4	4	4	5	5	4	4	4	4	4	4
Metalist1925	9	13	8	6	5	5	3	5	6	6	6	9	8	6	8	7	6	6	6	6	6	5	4	4	5	5	5	6	5	5
Kolos	3	2	4	3	2	3	4	7	7	7	7	6	4	4	5	6	7	7	7	7	7	7	7	7	6	6	6	7	7	6
Kryvbas	11	8	7	4	4	4	5	3	1	5	5	5	5	5	4	5	5	5	5	5	5	6	6	6	7	7	7	5	6	7
Zorya	7	4	9	5	7	10	11	9	9	8	8	7	6	8	7	8	8	8	8	8	8	9	9	9	9	8	8	8	8	8
Karpaty	16	12	13	14	12	11	10	8	10	10	9	8	9	9	9	9	10	12	11	10	9	8	8	8	8	9	9	9	9	9
Epitsentr	14	15	15	15	15	15	15	16	14	13	13	13	13	14	14	14	14	14	14	13	13	12	12	12	12	12	12	11	11	10
Veres	13	14	14	13	10	9	7	12	12	12	11	10	10	10	10	11	9	9	9	11	11	11	10	10	10	10	10	10	10	11
Obolon	8	5	5	7	6	8	9	10	8	9	12	11	11	17	11	12	12	10	10	9	10	10	11	11	11	11	11	12	12	12
Kudrivka	1	7	6	7	9	12	8	11	11	11	10	12	12	12	13	13	13	13	12	12	12	13	13	13	13	13	13	13	13	13
Rukh	4	11	12	11	16	16	16	14	15	15	15	15	15	13	12	10	11	11	13	14	14	14	14	14	14	14	14	14	14	14
Oleksandriya	15	16	16	16	14	13	13	13	13	14	14	14	14	15	15	15	15	15	15	15	15	15	15	15	15	15	15	15	15	15
Poltava	12	10	11	12	13	14	14	15	16	16	16	16	16	16	16	16	16	16	16	16	16	16	16	16	16	16	16	16	16	16

League leaders/Champions of 2025–26 Ukrainian Premier League/Qualification for the Champions League 2QR
Qualification for Conference League 2QR
Qualification for the Relegation play-offs
Relegation to Ukrainian First League

Updated to match(es) played on 24 May 2026. Source:

== Season statistics ==
=== Top goalscorers ===
As of 24 May 2026

Rank	Scorer	Team	Goals Pen.
1	(Ukraine) Matviy Ponomarenko	Dynamo Kyiv	13 (0)
2	(Ukraine) Andriy Storchous	Kudrivka	12 (1)
2	(Ukraine) Pylyp Budkivskyi	Zorya Luhansk	12 (3)
4	(Venezuela) Gleiker Mendoza	Kryvbas Kryvyi Rih	11 (0)
5	(Nigeria) Peter Itodo	Metalist 1925 Kharkiv	10 (0)
5	(Nigeria) Prosper Obah	LNZ Cherkasy / Shakhtar Donetsk	10 (1)
7	(The Gambia) Baboucarr Faal	Rukh Lviv / Karpaty Lviv	9 (0)
7	(Ukraine) Mykola Hayduchyk	Polissya Zhytomyr	9 (0)
7	(Ukraine) Andriy Yarmolenko	Dynamo Kyiv	9 (3)
10	(Ghana) Mark Assinor	LNZ Cherkasy	8 (0)
10	(Venezuela) Carlos Paraco	Kryvbas Kryvyi Rih	8 (0)
10	(Ukraine) Vadym Sydun	Epitsentr Kamianets-Podilskyi	8 (0)
10	(Brazil) Bruninho	Karpaty Lviv	8 (1)
10	(Ukraine) Oleksiy Hutsulyak	Polissya Zhytomyr	8 (3)
10	(Ukraine) Yehor Tverdokhlib	Kryvbas Kryvyi Rih / LNZ Cherkasy	8 (3)
10	(Spain) Joaquinete	Epitsentr Kamianets-Podilskyi	8 (6)

First goal of the season:

- (Ukraine national football team) Mykyta Burda – Kolos vs Kryvbas (1 August 2025)

Own goals:

- (Ukraine national football team) Yevhen Misyura – for Rukh vs SC Poltava (1 August 2025)
- (Ukraine national football team) Anton Yashkov – for FC Oleksandriya vs FC Kudrivka (3 August 2025)
- (Ukraine national football team) Vitaliy Kholod – for Dynamo vs Rukh (8 August 2025)
- (Ukraine national football team) Stepan Hryhorashchuk – for Kolos vs Epitsentr (30 August 2025)
- (Ukraine national football team) Andriy Lomnytskyi – for Karpaty vs Obolon (22 September 2025)
- (Ukraine national football team) Vladyslav Moroz – for Kudrivka vs Epitsentr (26 September 2025)
- (Portugal national football team) Miguel Campos – for Karpaty vs Oleksandriya (4 October 2025)
- (Ukraine national football team) Valeriy Dubko – for Veres vs Obolon (4 October 2025)
- (Ukraine national football team) Oleksandr Kemkin – for Kudrivka vs Kryvbas (5 October 2025)
- (Ukraine national football team) Vladyslav Kabayev – for Shakhtar vs Dynamo (2 November 2025)
- (Ukraine national football team) Vadym Pidlepych – for Shakhtar vs Poltava (9 November 2025)
- (Ukraine national football team) Bohdan Mykhaylichenko – for Karpaty vs Polissya (13 December 2025)
- (Brazil national football team) Jordan (2) – for Kudrivka vs Zorya (23 February 2026)
- (Ukraine national football team) Artur Ryabov – for Shakhtar vs LNZ Cherkasy (13 April 2026)
- (Ukraine national football team) Valeriy Bondar — for LNZ Cherkasy vs Shakhtar (13 April 2026)
- (Ukraine national football team) Oleksiy Tovarnytskyi — for Kryvbas vs Rukh (19 April 2026)
- (Ukraine national football team) Volodymyr Yasinskyi — for Kryvbas vs Rukh (19 April 2026)
- (Spain national football team) Nil Coch – for Polissya vs Epitsentr (12 May 2026)
- (Ukraine national football team) Yuriy Kopyna — for FC Oleksandriya vs Rukh (17 May 2026)

Last goal of the season : (Note: The matches were played at the same time. Goals were scored in the 82nd minute in both matches.)

- (Panama national football team) Eduardo Guerrero – Dynamo vs Kudrivka (24 May 2026)
- (Ukraine national football team) Eduard Sarapiy – Polissya vs Rukh (24 May 2026)

=== Clean sheets ===
As of 24 May 2026

Rank	Player	Club	Clean sheets
1	(Ukraine) Oleksiy Palamarchuk	LNZ Cherkasy	17
2	(Ukraine) Dmytro Riznyk	Shakhtar Donetsk	16
3	(Ukraine) Nazar Domchak	Karpaty Lviv	14
3	(Ukraine) Danylo Varakuta	Metalist 1925 Kharkiv	14
3	(Ukraine) Yevhen Volynets	Polissya Zhytomyr	14
6	(Ukraine) Ivan Pakholyuk	Kolos Kovalivka	11
7	(Ukraine) Oleh Bilyk	Epitsentr Kamianets-Podilskyi	9
8	(Ukraine) Valentyn Horokh	Veres Rivne	8
9	(Ukraine) Ruslan Neshcheret	Dynamo Kyiv	7
9	(Ukraine) Oleksandr Saputin	Zorya Luhansk	7

=== Hat-tricks ===
As of 24 May 2026

Player	For	Against	Result	Date
(Burkina Faso) Lassina Traoré	Shakhtar Donetsk	Karpaty Lviv	3–0 (H)	22 February 2026
(Bosnia and Herzegovina) Nemanja Anđušić	Zorya Luhansk	SC Poltava	4–0 (H)	8 March 2026
(Nigeria) Peter Itodo	Metalist 1925 Kharkiv	Veres Rivne	4–0 (H)	15 April 2026
(Venezuela) Gleiker Mendoza^{4}	Kryvbas Kryvyi Rih	Dynamo Kyiv	5–6 (H)	26 April 2026

== Awards ==
=== Monthly awards ===
Month	Player of the Month		Coach of the Month		Ref.
Month	Player	Club	Coach	Club	Ref.
August 2025	(Ukraine) Andriy Storchous	Kudrivka	(Ukraine) Vasyl Baranov	Kudrivka	
September 2025	(Brazil) Bruninho	Karpaty Lviv	(Croatia) Mladen Bartulović	Metalist 1925 Kharkiv	
October 2025	(Nigeria) Prosper Obah	LNZ Cherkasy	(Ukraine) Vitaliy Ponomaryov	LNZ Cherkasy	
November 2025 December 2025	(Ukraine) Oleksiy Hutsulyak	Polissya Zhytomyr	(Ukraine) Vitaliy Ponomaryov	LNZ Cherkasy	
February 2026 March 2026	(Ukraine) Matviy Ponomarenko	Dynamo Kyiv	(Ukraine) Ihor Kostyuk	Dynamo Kyiv	
April 2026	(Venezuela) Gleiker Mendoza	Kryvbas Kryvyi Rih	(Spain) Fran Fernández	Karpaty Lviv	
May 2026	(Ukraine) Andriy Storchous	Kudrivka	(Turkey) Arda Turan	Shakhtar Donetsk	

=== Round awards ===
The list includes winners of the Round by the Ukrainian Premier League as well as the Ukrainian internet publisher "SportArena".

Round	Player			Coach		
Round	Player	Club	Reference	Coach	Club	Reference
Round 1	(Ukraine) Andriy Storchous (SA)	FC Kudrivka		(Ukraine) Ruslan Rotan (SA)	Polissya Zhytomyr	
Round 1	(Ukraine) Andriy Storchous (UPL)	FC Kudrivka		(Ukraine) Vasyl Baranov (UPL)	FC Kudrivka	
Round 2	(Venezuela) Gleiker Mendoza (SA)	Kryvbas Kryvyi Rih		(Ukraine) Oleksandr Antonenko (SA)	Obolon Kyiv	
Round 2	(Venezuela) Gleiker Mendoza (UPL)	Kryvbas Kryvyi Rih		(Ukraine) Vladyslav Lupashko (UPL)	Karpaty Lviv	
Round 3	(Ukraine) Maksym Zaderaka (SA)	Kryvbas Kryvyi Rih		(Ukraine) Vitaliy Ponomaryov (SA)	LNZ Cherkasy	
Round 3	(Ukraine) Maksym Zaderaka (UPL)	Kryvbas Kryvyi Rih		(Ukraine) Vitaliy Ponomaryov (UPL)	LNZ Cherkasy	
Round 4	(Ukraine) Vitaliy Buyalskyi (SA)	Dynamo Kyiv		(Ukraine) Oleksandr Shovkovskyi (SA)	Dynamo Kyiv	
Round 4	(Ukraine) Yehor Tverdokhlib (UPL)	Kryvbas Kryvyi Rih		(Ukraine) Oleksandr Shovkovskyi (UPL)	Dynamo Kyiv	
Round 5	(Albania) Tedi Cara (SA)	FC Oleksandriya		(Ukraine) Oleksandr Antonenko (SA)	Obolon Kyiv	
Round 5	(Albania) Tedi Cara (UPL)	FC Oleksandriya		(Croatia) Mladen Bartulović (UPL)	Metalist 1925 Kharkiv	
Round 6	(Venezuela) Gleiker Mendoza (SA)	Kryvbas Kryvyi Rih		(Ukraine) Vitaliy Ponomaryov (SA)	LNZ Cherkasy	
Round 6	(Venezuela) Gleiker Mendoza (UPL)	Kryvbas Kryvyi Rih		(Ukraine) Kyrylo Nesterenko (UPL)	FC Oleksandriya	
Round 7	(Brazil) Pedrihno (SA)	Shakhtar Donetsk		(Ukraine) Ruslan Rotan (SA)	Polissya Zhytomyr	
Round 7	(Ukraine) Oleksandr Filippov (UPL)	Polissya Zhytomyr		(Ukraine) Ruslan Rotan (UPL)	Polissya Zhytomyr	
Round 8	(Nigeria) Prosper Obah (SA)	LNZ Cherkasy		(Ukraine) Vitaliy Ponomaryov (SA)	LNZ Cherkasy	
Round 8	(Venezuela) Gleiker Mendoza (UPL)	Kryvbas Kryvyi Rih		(Ukraine) Vitaliy Ponomaryov (UPL)	LNZ Cherkasy	
Round 9	(Ukraine) Mykola Myronyuk (SA)	Epitsentr Kamianets-Podilskyi		(Ukraine) Serhiy Nahornyak (SA)	Epitsentr Kamianets-Podilskyi	
Round 9	(Ukraine) Mykola Myronyuk (UPL)	Epitsentr Kamianets-Podilskyi		(Ukraine) Serhiy Nahornyak (UPL)	Epitsentr Kamianets-Podilskyi	
Round 10	(Ukraine) Vladyslav Veleten (SA)	Polissya Zhytomyr		(Ukraine) Ruslan Rotan (SA)	Polissya Zhytomyr	
Round 10	(Ukraine) Vladyslav Veleten (UPL)	Polissya Zhytomyr		(Ukraine) Oleksandr Shovkovskyi (UPL)	Dynamo Kyiv	
Round 11	(Turkey) Eren Aydın (SA)	Veres Rivne		(Turkey) Arda Turan (SA)	Shakhtar Donetsk	
Round 11	(Turkey) Eren Aydın (UPL)	Veres Rivne		(Turkey) Arda Turan (UPL)	Shakhtar Donetsk	
Round 11	(Brazil) Eguinaldo (UPL)	Shakhtar Donetsk		(Turkey) Arda Turan (UPL)	Shakhtar Donetsk	
Round 12	(Ukraine) Eduard Sarapiy (SA)	Polissya Zhytomyr		(Ukraine) Vitaliy Ponomaryov (SA)	LNZ Cherkasy	
Round 12	(Ukraine) Yevheniy Pastukh (UPL)	LNZ Cherkasy		(Ukraine) Vitaliy Ponomaryov (UPL)	LNZ Cherkasy	
Round 13	(Ukraine) Yuriy Klymchuk (SA)	Kolos Kovalivka		(Ukraine) Ruslan Kostyshyn (SA)	Kolos Kovalivka	
Round 13	(Ukraine) Yuriy Klymchuk (UPL)	Kolos Kovalivka		(Ukraine) Ruslan Kostyshyn (UPL)	Kolos Kovalivka	
Round 14	(Armenia) Valeriy Voskonyan (SA)	SC Poltava		(Ukraine) Pavlo Matviychenko (SA)	SC Poltava	
Round 14	(Armenia) Valeriy Voskonyan (UPL)	SC Poltava		(Ukraine) Pavlo Matviychenko (UPL)	SC Poltava	
Round 15	(Ukraine) Artur Mykytyshyn (SA)	Kryvbas Kryvyi Rih		(Ukraine) Viktor Skrypnyk (SA)	Zorya Luhansk	
Round 15	(Nigeria) Peter Itodo (UPL)	Metalist 1925 Kharkiv		(Ukraine) Ivan Fedyk (UPL)	Rukh Lviv	
Round 16	(Ukraine) Oleksiy Hutsulyak (SA)	Polissya Zhytomyr		(Ukraine) Ihor Kostyuk (SA)	Dynamo Kyiv	
Round 16	(Ukraine) Oleksiy Hutsulyak (UPL)	Polissya Zhytomyr		(Ukraine) Vitaliy Ponomaryov (UPL)	LNZ Cherkasy	
winter break
Round 17	(Burkina Faso) Lassina Traoré (SA)	Shakhtar Donetsk		(Ukraine) Ruslan Rotan (SA)	Polissya Zhytomyr	
Round 17	(Burkina Faso) Lassina Traoré (UPL)	Shakhtar Donetsk		(Turkey) Arda Turan (UPL)	Shakhtar Donetsk	
Round 18	(Ukraine) Matviy Ponomarenko (SA)	Dynamo Kyiv		(Ukraine) Ruslan Rotan (SA)	Polissya Zhytomyr	
Round 18	(Ukraine) Matviy Ponomarenko (UPL)	Dynamo Kyiv		(Ukraine) Ruslan Rotan (UPL)	Polissya Zhytomyr	
Round 19	(Ukraine) Vladyslav Supriaha (SA)	Epitsentr Kamianets-Podilskyi		(Ukraine) Ihor Kostyuk (SA)	Dynamo Kyiv	
Round 19	(Ukraine) Vladyslav Supriaha (UPL)	Epitsentr Kamianets-Podilskyi		(Ukraine) Serhiy Nahornyak (UPL)	Epitsentr Kamianets-Podilskyi	
Round 20	(Ukraine) Andriy Yarmolenko (SA)	Dynamo Kyiv		(Ukraine) Serhiy Nahornyak (SA)	Epitsentr Kamianets-Podilskyi	
Round 20	(Brazil) Bruninho (UPL)	Karpaty Lviv		(Ukraine) Ruslan Rotan (UPL)	Polissya Zhytomyr	
Round 21	(Ukraine) Oleksiy Hutsulyak (SA)	Polissya Zhytomyr		(Spain) Fran Fernández (SA)	Karpaty Lviv	
Round 21	(Ukraine) Oleksiy Hutsulyak (UPL)	Polissya Zhytomyr		(Spain) Fran Fernández (UPL)	Karpaty Lviv	
Round 22	(Ukraine) Danylo Kravchuk (SA)	LNZ Cherkasy		(Spain) Fran Fernández (SA)	Karpaty Lviv	
Round 22	(Ukraine) Danylo Kravchuk (UPL)	LNZ Cherkasy		(Spain) Fran Fernández (UPL)	Karpaty Lviv	
Round 23	(Ukraine) Denys Antyukh (SA)	Metalist 1925 Kharkiv		(Croatia) Mladen Bartulović (SA)	Metalist 1925 Kharkiv	
Round 23	(Brazil) Jordan (UPL)	Zorya Luhansk		(Croatia) Mladen Bartulović (UPL)	Metalist 1925 Kharkiv	
Round 24	(Ukraine) Valeriy Bondar (SA)	Shakhtar Donetsk		(Turkey) Arda Turan (SA)	Shakhtar Donetsk	
Round 24	(Ukraine) Valeriy Bondar (UPL)	Shakhtar Donetsk		(Turkey) Arda Turan (UPL)	Shakhtar Donetsk	
Round 25	(Venezuela) Gleiker Mendoza (SA)	Kryvbas Kryvyi Rih		(Ukraine) Viktor Skrypnyk (SA)	Zorya Luhansk	
Round 25	(Venezuela) Gleiker Mendoza (UPL)	Kryvbas Kryvyi Rih		(Ukraine) Ihor Kostyuk (UPL)	Dynamo Kyiv	
Round 26	(Burkina Faso) Lassina Traoré (SA)	Shakhtar Donetsk		(Turkey) Arda Turan (SA)	Shakhtar Donetsk	
Round 26	(Burkina Faso) Lassina Traoré (UPL)	Shakhtar Donetsk		(Turkey) Arda Turan (UPL)	Shakhtar Donetsk	
Round 27	(Burkina Faso) Lassina Traoré (SA)	Shakhtar Donetsk		(Netherlands) Patrick van Leeuwen (SA)	Kryvbas Kryvyi Rih	
Round 27	(Ukraine) Taras Lyakh (UPL)	Obolon Kyiv		(Turkey) Arda Turan (UPL)	Shakhtar Donetsk	
Round 28	(Spain) Joaquinete (SA)	Epitsentr Kamianets-Podilskyi		(Ukraine) Serhiy Nahornyak (SA)	Epitsentr Kamianets-Podilskyi	
Round 28	(Spain) Joaquinete (UPL)	Epitsentr Kamianets-Podilskyi		(Ukraine) Serhiy Nahornyak (UPL)	Epitsentr Kamianets-Podilskyi	
Round 29	(Nigeria) Prosper Obah (SA)	Shakhtar Donetsk		(Ukraine) Oleksandr Protchenko (SA)	FC Kudrivka	
Round 29	(Moldova) Vladyslav Babohlo (UPL)	Karpaty Lviv		(Ukraine) Oleksandr Protchenko (UPL)	FC Kudrivka	
Round 30	(Ukraine) Andriy Storchous (SA)	FC Kudrivka		(Ukraine) Vitaliy Ponomaryov (SA)	LNZ Cherkasy	
Round 30	(Ukraine) Andriy Storchous (UPL)	FC Kudrivka		(Ukraine) Ruslan Kostyshyn (UPL)	Kolos Kovalivka	

== Relegation play-offs ==
Teams that placed 13th and 14th in the 2025–26 Ukrainian Premier League play a two-leg play-off with the third and fourth teams of the 2025–26 Ukrainian First League.

The withdrawn 14th-placed Rukh Lviv (Note: The participation of FC Rukh in the relegation playoffs is to be confirmed, since the owner announced that the club may not participate in that stage.) was replaced with the 15th-placed FC Oleksandriya.

This round includes 2 clubs from the Premier League: FC Oleksandriya and Kudrivka; 2 clubs from the First League: Livyi Bereh Kyiv and Ahrobiznes Volochysk.

Premier League teams	Agg.	First League teams	1st leg	2nd leg
FC Oleksandriya	1–2	Livyi Bereh Kyiv	1–1	0–1
Kudrivka	2–2 (3–2 p)	Ahrobiznes Volochysk	0–0	2–2

=== First Semi-final ===
5 June 2025
15:30

FC Oleksandriya	1–1	Livyi Bereh Kyiv
Yade 21'	Report	Voloshyn 51'

CSC Nika, Oleksandriya
Attendance: 1170
Referee: Oleksiy Derevinskyi (Khmelnytskyi)

9 June 2026
15:30

Livyi Bereh Kyiv	1–0	FC Oleksandriya
Banada 45'	Report

Arena Livyi Bereh, Kyiv
Attendance: 1285
Referee: Dmytro Panchyshyn (Kharkiv)

Livyi Bereh Kyiv won 2–1 on aggregate and promotion to Premier League.

==== Second Semi-final ====
5 June 2026
18:00

Kudrivka	0–0	Ahrobiznes Volochysk
	Report

Avanhard, Rivne
Attendance: 75
Referee: Vitaliy Romanov (Dnipro)

9 June 2026
18:00

Ahrobiznes Volochysk	2–2	Kudrivka
B. Kozak 70'; Tolochko 90+1' (p)	Report	Machelyuk 39'; Lyehostayev 81'
Penalties
Havrushko (penalty missed); B.Kozak (penalty scored); Riznyk (penalty missed); Nyzhnyk (penalty scored); Tolochko (penalty missed)	2–3	(penalty missed) Veklyak; (penalty scored) Dumanyuk; (penalty scored) Machelyuk; (penalty missed) Hlushchenko; (penalty scored) Lyehostayev

Ternopilskyi miskyi imeni Shukhevycha, Ternopil
Attendance: 2500
Referee: Oleksandr Shandor (Lviv)

2–2 on aggregate; Kudrivka won 3–2 on penalties

== See also ==
- 2025–26 Ukrainian Cup
- 2025–26 Ukrainian First League
- 2025–26 Ukrainian Second League
- 2025–26 Ukrainian Amateur Cup
- 2025–26 Ukrainian Football Amateur League
- 2025–26 Ukrainian Premier League Under-19
- 2025–26 Ukrainian Women's Top League
- List of Ukrainian football transfers summer 2025
- List of Ukrainian football transfers winter 2025–26
