= Oleksandr Protchenko =

Ukrainian football coach

Personal information
- Full name: Oleksandr Olehovych Protchenko
- Date of birth: 3 October 1992 (age 34)
- Place of birth: Ukraine
- Height: 1.70 m (5 ft 7 in)

Team information
- Current team: Kudrivka (manager)

Youth career
- Years: Team
- 2011–2012: Arsenal Kyiv

Managerial career
- 2018–2019: Arsenal Kyiv (U17)
- 2019–2021: Chaika Petropavlivska Borshchahivka (assistant)
- 2023–2024: Nyva Buzova (technical director)
- 2024–2026: Kudrivka (technical director)
- 2026: Kudrivka (U19)
- 2026: Kudrivka (caretaker)
- 2026–: Kudrivka

Oleksandr Olehovych Protchenko (Ukrainian: Олександр Олегович Протченко; born 3 October 1992) is a Ukrainian football manager who is the current manager of Kudrivka in the Ukrainian Premier League.

== Coaching career ==
Protchenko began his managerial career in 2018, leading Arsenal Kyiv's U17 team. The following year, he joined Chaika Petropavlivska Borshchahivka as an assistant coach, a position he held until 2021. Later in 2021, he took over as manager of Kudrivka in Irpin, transitioning into the role of technical director for the club in 2023.

On 20 February 2026, Protchenko was appointed head coach of Kudrivka's U19 squad, succeeding Vitaliy Kostyshyn and Serhiy Siminin following a string of poor results.

Following Vasyl Baranov's dismissal from the senior team in May 2026, Protchenko was named interim head coach of Kudrivka. He made his managerial debut for the senior squad on 9 May 2026 against Kolos Kovalivka at the Kolos Stadium. On 19 May 2026, after leading Kudrivka to a victory over LNZ Cherkasy, he was named the best coach of matchday 29.

He led the team to the play-offs, allowing the team to qualify for the second consecutive year in the Ukrainian Premier League. On 11 June 2026 he was confirmed as Kudrivka's coach for the next season as well. On 9 November 2026, he was included in the Best XI of Round 12 of the 2026–27 Ukrainian Premier League.

== Personal life ==
From 2022 to 2025 he served in the Armed Forces of Ukraine during the Russo-Ukrainian war.

== Honours ==
Individual

- Ukrainian Premier League Coach of the Round: 2025–26 (Round 29),
