= Maciej Kędziorek =

Polish football manager (born 1980)

- Kędziorek as Dynamo Kyiv manager in 2026

Personal information
- Date of birth: 1 July 1980 (age 46)
- Place of birth: Otwock, Poland

Team information
- Current team: Dynamo Kyiv (caretaker manager)

Managerial career
- Years: Team
- 2009–2011: Wilga Garwolin
- 2011: Radość Warsaw
- 2011–2013: Start Otwock
- 2014–2016: Victoria Sulejówek
- 2023–2024: Radomiak Radom
- 2026–: Dynamo Kyiv (caretaker)

Maciej Kędziorek (born 1 July 1980) is a Polish professional football manager who currently serves as the caretaker manager of Ukrainian Premier League club Dynamo Kyiv.

== Career ==
=== Lower divisions ===
Kędziorek started his coaching career managing youth sides of Mazur Karczew. He took on his first senior managerial role in 2009, taking charge of regional league club Wilga Garwolin, where he stayed until 2011.

He then had stints with lower division clubs such as Radość Warsaw, Start Otwock and Victoria Sulejówek.

=== Assistant roles ===
On 18 April 2016, Kędziorek joined Marek Papszun's staff at Raków Częstochowa as an assistant. While at the club, Kędziorek oversaw Raków's ascent from II liga to Ekstraklasa, before leaving on 29 December 2019.

Highly regarded for his match analysis and set-pieces, Kędziorek was invited by Poland under-21 team manager Czesław Michniewicz to join his staff for the 2019 UEFA Euro U21.

On 11 May 2020, he moved to I liga club Arka Gdynia to operate as an assistant coach. On 18 June 2021, after working with head coaches Ireneusz Mamrot and Dariusz Marzec, he left the Pomeranian side by mutual consent.

He spent the following two-and-a-half years as an assistant for Ekstraklasa side Lech Poznań whom he joined on 21 June 2021; in his first year with the club, Lech won the 2021–22 Ekstraklasa title under manager Maciej Skorża, and followed it up during the 2022–23 season with a successful European campaign, reaching the UEFA Europa Conference League quarterfinals with John van den Brom in charge.

=== Radomiak Radom ===
On 1 December 2023, he left Lech to take charge of Ekstraklasa club Radomiak Radom. The following day, Radomiak won their first game under Kędziorek, securing a decisive 0–3 away win over Widzew Łódź. In their last game of 2023, Kędziorek led Radomiak to a 2–2 comeback draw against Lech on 16 December, resulting in his former supervisor van den Brom's sacking the next day.

Throughout the season, Radomiak recorded wins over title contenders Raków Częstochowa and Legia Warsaw, while failing to score points in games against lower-placed teams such as ŁKS Łódź, Ruch Chorzów or derby rivals Korona Kielce. They also faced disciplinary issues, gathering seven red cards in 17 games since Kędziorek was appointed manager. He was relieved of his duties on 19 May 2024, one week before the last matchday. After leaving Radomiak, Kędziorek became a pundit for Polish sports website meczyki.pl.

=== Dynamo Kyiv ===
On 26 August 2025, Kędziorek joined Dynamo Kyiv's coaching staff as an assistant coach, focusing on performance analysis and set-pieces. On 18 October 2026, he was appointed manager on a caretaker basis after the sacking of Ihor Kostyuk. He took charge of his first match on 23 October, guiding Dynamo to a 3–1 league win over Kudrivka.

== Managerial statistics ==
As of match played 7 November 2026

Managerial record by team and tenure
Team	From	To	Record							
Team	From	To	G	W	D	L	GF	GA	GD	Win %
Wilga Garwolin	22 June 2009	30 June 2011	62	33	11	18	162	99	+63	53.23
Radość Warsaw	1 July 2011	16 December 2011	19	11	3	5	44	35	+9	57.89
Start Otwock	16 December 2011	9 September 2013	54	20	12	22	76	74	+2	37.04
Victoria Sulejówek	29 July 2014	14 March 2016	63	32	13	18	147	83	+64	50.79
Radomiak Radom	1 December 2023	19 May 2024	17	5	4	8	22	35	−13	29.41
Dynamo Kyiv (caretaker)	18 October 2026	Present	4	2	1	1	5	4	+1	50.00
Total			219	103	44	72	456	330	+126	47.03

== Honours ==
Victoria Sulejówek

- Polish Cup (Warsaw regionals): 2014–15
