= Vyacheslav Surkis =

Ukrainian footballer

Personal information
- Full name: Vyacheslav Hryhorovych Surkis
- Date of birth: 27 February 2006 (age 20)
- Place of birth: Kyiv, Ukraine
- Height: 1.91 m (6 ft 3 in)
- Position: Goalkeeper

Team information
- Current team: Dynamo Kyiv
- Number: 71

Youth career
- Obolon Kyiv
- –2026: Dynamo Kyiv
- 2022–2023: → Zorya Luhansk (loan)

Senior career*
Years	Team	Apps	(Gls)
2026–	Dynamo Kyiv	5	(0)

International career
2022–2023	Ukraine U17	3	(0)
2023	Ukraine U18	2	(0)
2023–2024	Ukraine U19	6	(0)
- * Club domestic league appearances and goals

Vyacheslav Hryhorovych Surkis (Ukrainian: Вячеслав Григорійович Суркіс; born 27 February 2006) is a Ukrainian professional footballer who plays as a goalkeeper for the Ukrainian Premier League club Dynamo Kyiv.

Surkis is a product of several Kyiv clubs. His first coaches were Vsevolod Romanenko and Serhiy Velychko.

On 24 August 2022, Surkis made his debut in the UPL under-19 championship, when he was loaned to Zorya Luhansk for a season and recorded 19 games that season. He then returned to Dynamo and, on 7 May 2026, became the first player to reach the 100-game mark in the under-19 competitions. He also recorded 10 games in the UEFA Youth League, making his first debut on 23 October 2024 against NK Maribor (2024–25 UEFA Youth League).

On 27 February 2026, Surkis made his debut for Dynamo's first team in the league game against FC Epitsentr Kamianets-Podilskyi.

Following the injury of Ruslan Neshcheret, Surkis became the team's first number at the beginning of the 2026–27 Ukrainian Premier League. On 30 July 2026, he made his debut in the 2026–27 UEFA Conference League in the away game against PAOK FC. After a poor performance of Surkis in the Matchweek 4 of the 2026–27 Ukrainian Premier League against Bukovyna Chernivtsi, when Dynamo was routed 0:3, the Kyivan club loaned their former goalkeeper Heorhiy Bushchan from Polissya Zhytomyr.

== Personal life ==
Surkis is the son of the UEFA Executive Committee official Hryhoriy Surkis and the nephew of Dynamo's president Ihor Surkis.
