= Mykola Myronyuk =

Ukrainian footballer

Personal information
- Full name: Mykola Oleksandrovych Myronyuk
- Date of birth: 19 February 2002 (age 24)
- Place of birth: Lutsk, Ukraine
- Height: 1.76 m (5 ft 9 in)
- Position: Central midfielder

Team information
- Current team: Epitsentr Kamianets-Podilskyi
- Number: 8

Youth career
- 2014–2017: Volyn Lutsk
- 2017–2018: VIK-Volyn Volodymyr-Volynskyi
- 2018–2019: KDYuSSh-15 Kyiv
- 2019: Volyn Lutsk

Senior career*
Years	Team	Apps	(Gls)
2019–2022	Volyn Lutsk	6	(0)
2020–2021	→ Volyn-2 Lutsk	20	(0)
2022–	Epitsentr Kamianets-Podilskyi	85	(5)
- * Club domestic league appearances and goals as of 3 June 2026

Mykola Oleksandrovych Myronyuk (Ukrainian: Микола Олександрович Миронюк; born 19 February 2002) is a Ukrainian professional footballer who plays as a central midfielder for Ukrainian club Epitsentr Kamianets-Podilskyi.

== Honours ==
Individual

- SportArena Player of the Round: 2025–26 (Round 9)
- Ukrainian Premier League Player of the Round: 2025–26 (Round 9),
