= Kyrylo Nesterenko =

Ukrainian footballer and manager

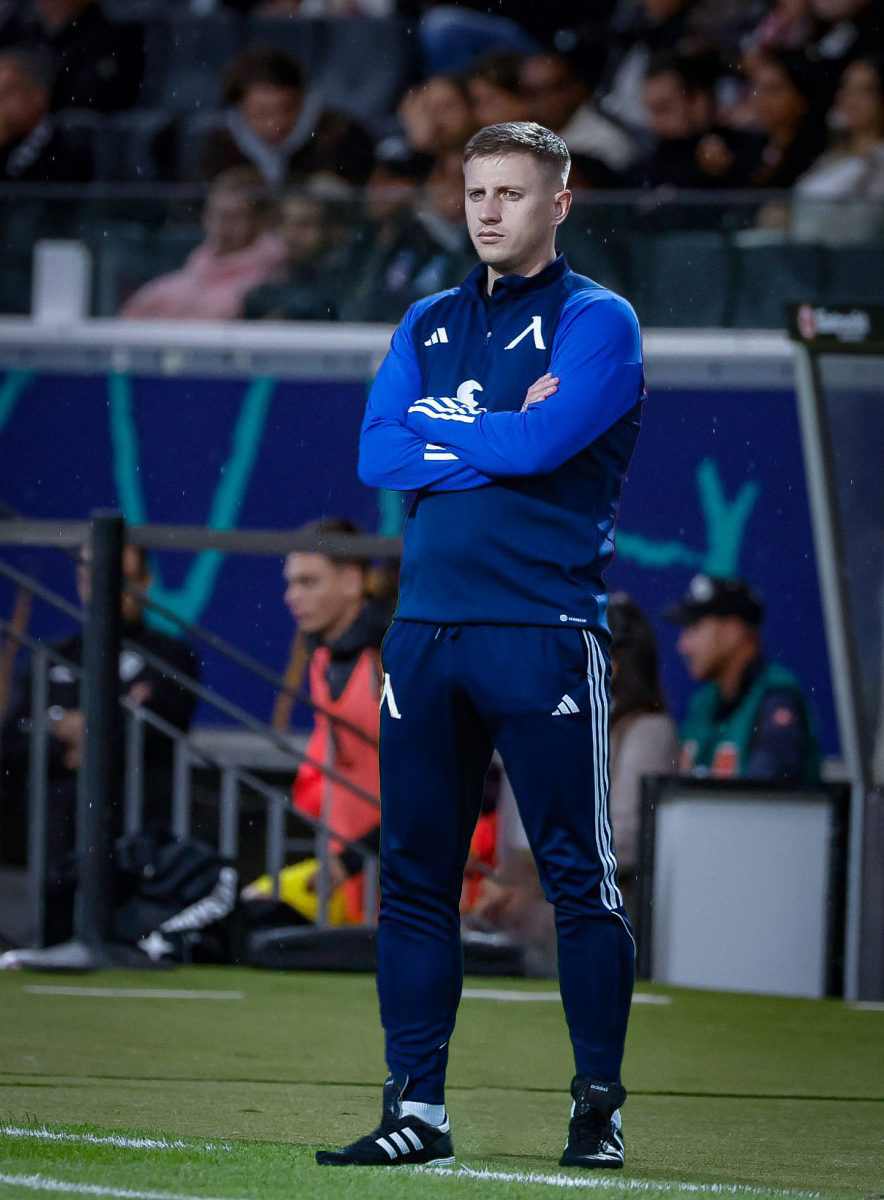

Personal information
- Full name: Kyrylo Oleksandrovych Nesterenko
- Date of birth: 1 March 1992 (age 34)
- Place of birth: Makiivka, Ukraine
- Height: 1.83 m (6 ft 0 in)
- Position: Midfielder

Team information
- Current team: Oleksandriya (manager)

Youth career
- 2005–2008: Metalurh Donetsk

Senior career*
Years	Team	Apps	(Gls)
2008–2015	Metalurh Donetsk	1	(0)
2015	Šiauliai	8	(1)
Total		9	(1)

Managerial career
- 2016–2017: Stal Kamianske (U21 coach)
- 2017: Stal Kamianske (caretaker)
- 2017–2018: Stal Kamianske (assistant)
- 2018–2019: Shakhter Karagandy (assistant)
- 2022: Caspiy (assistant)
- 2023–2024: Levski Sofia (assistant)
- 2025–: Oleksandriya
- * Club domestic league appearances and goals

Kyrylo Oleksandrovych Nesterenko (Ukrainian: Кирило Олександрович Нестеренко; born 1 March 1992) is a Ukrainian former professional football midfielder, defender of Metalurh Donetsk. Currently manager of Oleksandriya.

== Career ==
Nesterenko is a graduate of the Metalurh Donetsk academy. He played in the Ukrainian Youth Football League from 2005 to 2009, participating in 74 matches and scoring 16 goals.

In 2008, Nesterenko was transferred to the youth team of Metalurh Donetsk, which competed in the youth championship Ukrainian Youth Football League of Ukrainian football. On August 1, 2008, Kyrylo made his debut in a youth championship away match against Kryvbas Kryvyi Rih (1:2). Nesterenko played wearing the number 26 jersey, substituting for Ihor Tymchenko in the 90th minute. In his first season in the youth championship 2008/09, he played 20 games.

In the following season, 2009/10, Kyrylo Nesterenko played 19 matches in the youth team, receiving 2 yellow cards. In the 2010/11 season of the youth championship, he participated in 22 matches, scoring 2 goals (against Kryvbas Kryvyi Rih and Volyn Lutsk) and receiving 3 yellow cards. In the 2011/12 season, Kyrylo began playing not only in his midfield position but also as a left-back. Throughout that season, Nesterenko played 22 games, scoring 3 goals (a brace against Vorskla Poltava and one goal against "Tavriya"), missing a penalty, and receiving 7 yellow cards.

On November 4, 2012, at the age of 20, Kyrylo Nesterenko made his debut in the Ukrainian Premier League for the main squad in an away match against Chornomorets Odesa (3:0). Nesterenko entered the game in the 78th minute, replacing Artem Baranovsky. On April 13, 2013, he played his 100th match in the youth championship in an away game against Kyiv's "Arsenal" (2:0). On May 18, 2013, in a match against Odesa's Chornomorets Odesa (4:0) in the reserve championship, Nesterenko suffered an injury, and after that, he did not play for seven months. In the youth championship 2012/13, he played 23 matches, scored 2 goals (against Volyn Lutsk and Vorskla Poltava), and received 5 yellow cards.

On the eve of the start of the 2013/14 Ukrainian Premier League, the head coach of Donetsk's Metalurh Donetsk, Yuriy Maksimov, had high hopes for Kyrylo Nesterenko, but due to an injury, he missed the season.

In the winter of 2014, the head coach of the main team of Metalurh Donetsk, Serhiy Tashuev, took Kyrylo Nesterenko for two training camps in Turkey. In the 2013/14 season, he played 3 games in the youth championship. In the following season, 2014/15, Nesterenko was not registered for Metalurh Donetsk due to a recurring knee injury.

In early 2015, he moved to the Lithuanian club Šiauliai.

After suffering a cruciate ligament injury, undergoing two unsuccessful knee surgeries, and enduring a prolonged rehabilitation, Kyrylo Nesterenko was forced to end his football career at the age of 24. Despite this, he decided to continue his involvement in football by becoming a coach at his hometown club, the same club that nurtured him as a player.

Since 2016, Kyrylo Nesterenko has been coaching the youth team (U-21) of Stal Kamianske. Starting from 2017, he became the coach of the main team of Stal Kamianske.

Kyrylo Nesterenko made history in the Ukrainian championship as the youngest coach of a UPL team. In the 11th round of the 2017/2018 Ukrainian championship, he led the main team of Stal Kamianske in a match against Veres Rivne, which had recently been recognized as the youngest team in Europe.

On December 9, 2017, he led the main team in a match against Mariupol. Due to disqualification, the head coach of Stal Kamianske, Nikolay Kostov, observed the game from the stands.

Stal Kamianske, which finished last season in the Ukrainian Premier League and changed its name to "Phoenix" Bucha, began preparations for the new season in the First League under the guidance of Kyrylo Nesterenko after returning from the break on June 21, 2018.

On July 9, 2018, due to financial difficulties, "Phoenix" Bucha (formerly Stal Kamianske) announced the cessation of its existence.

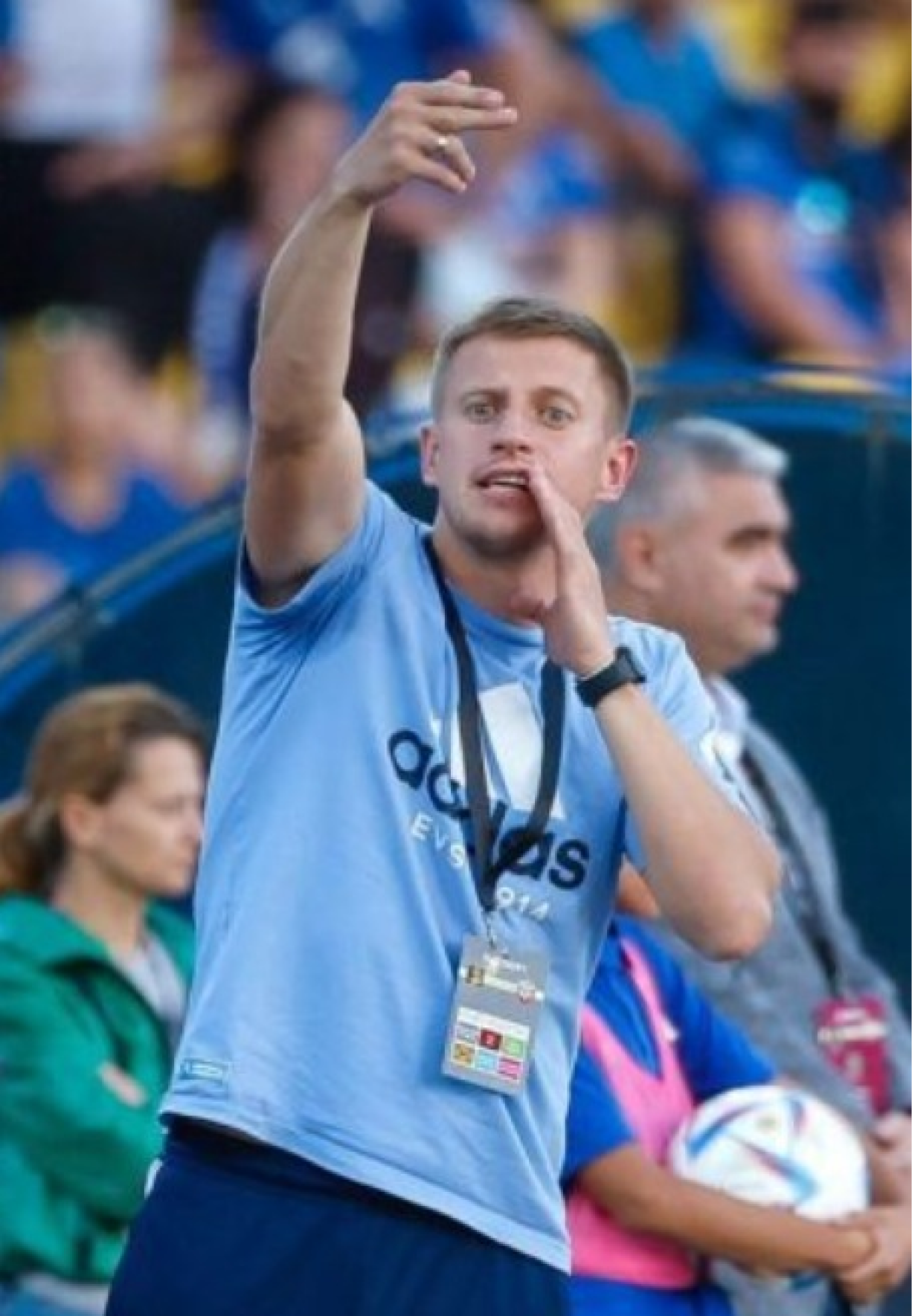

On July 18, 2018, Kyrylo Nesterenko signed a contract with the Kazakhstani club Shakhter Karagandy and was appointed as an assistant to the head coach Nikolay Kostov.

At the end of the 2019 season, after the expiration of his contract with Shakhter Karagandy, he returned to Ukraine. In 2020, he furthered his coaching qualifications through training at Shakhtar Donetsk.

After a brief hiatus and the COVID-19 pandemic, in 2021, Kyrylo Nesterenko was invited as an expert-analyst by the Football 1 channel. The year 2021 was notable and productive for Kyrylo as he participated in the matches of the Ukrainian Championship 2021/22 and analyzed the Euro 2020 games.

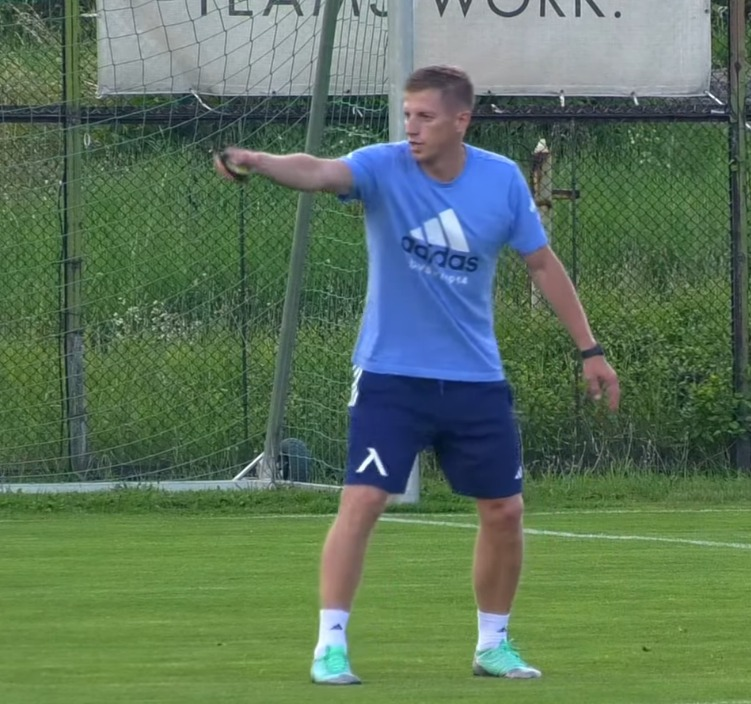

In early 2022, he returned to his coaching roots, signing a contract. Kyrylo Nesterenko joined the coaching staff of the Caspiy Aktau club in the Kazakhstan championship. The team's head coach is Nikolay Kostov, well-known to Ukrainian fans for his work at Karpaty and Donetsk's Metalurh. Previously, the experts had already worked together at Kamianske's "Stal," "Shakhtar" Karaganda, and in Kazakhstan.

After completing his work at Caspiy Aktau in November 2022, Nesterenko continued his football career, signing a contract with Levski Sofia. Levski Sofia is one of the leading football clubs in Bulgaria, competing in the national First Professional Football League. "Levski" Sofia will participate in the qualifying round of the Conference League. For Kyrylo Nesterenko, joining Levski Sofia represents a new challenge in his coaching career. After gaining experience at FC Caspiy Aktau, his move to Levski Sofia allows him to expand his horizons and implement his ideas in a new environment.

== Honours ==
Individual

- Ukrainian Premier League Coach of the Round: 2025–26 (Round 6),
