= Ruslan Kostyshyn =

Ukrainian footballer

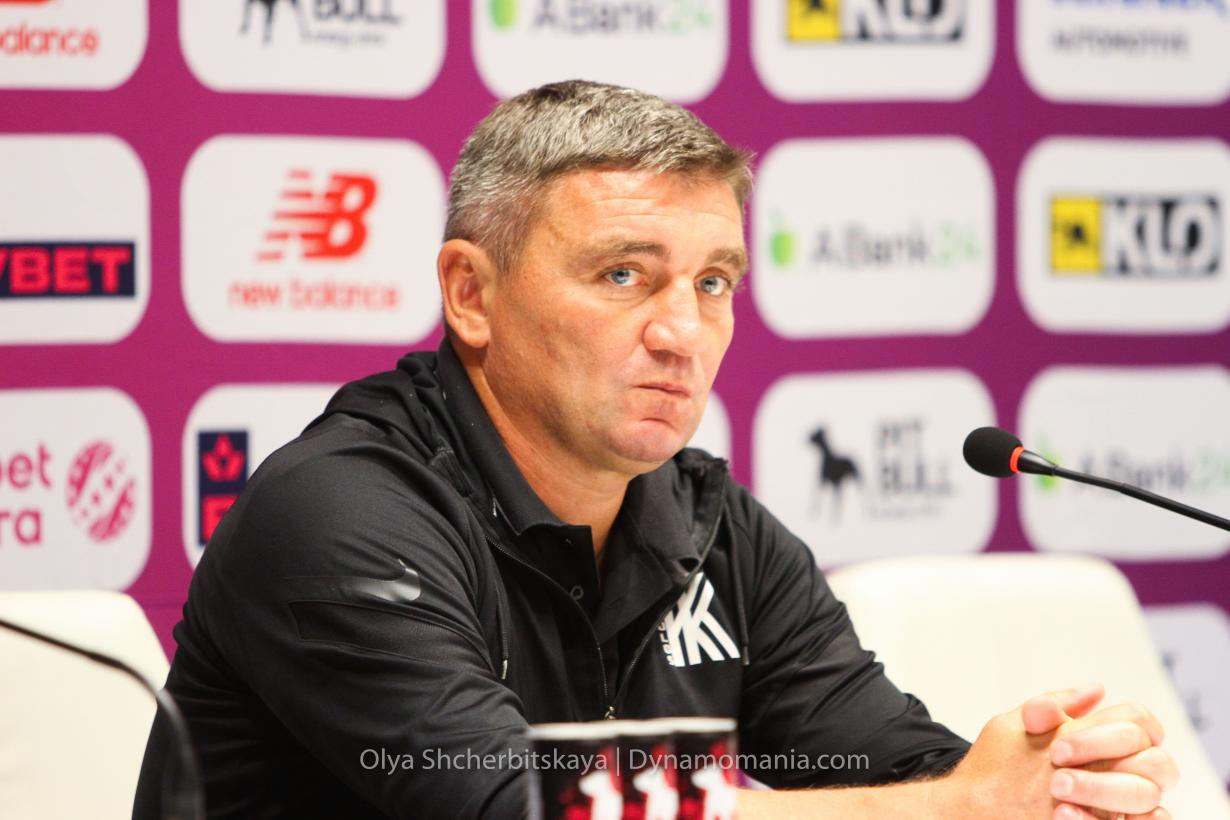

Personal information
- Full name: Ruslan Volodymyrovych Kostyshyn
- Date of birth: 8 January 1977 (age 49)
- Place of birth: Khmelnytskyi, Ukrainian SSR (now Ukraine)
- Height: 1.81 m (5 ft 11 in)
- Position: Midfielder

Team information
- Current team: Kolos Kovalivka (manager)

Youth career
- Podillya Khmelnytskyi

Senior career*
Years	Team	Apps	(Gls)
1994–1996	Podillya Khmelnytskyi	45	(3)
1994	→ Advis Khmelnytskyi (loan)	12	(0)
1996–2002	CSKA / Arsenal Kyiv	130	(11)
1997–2001	→ CSKA-2 Kyiv	52	(9)
2002–2007	Dnipro Dnipropetrovsk	190	(13)
2004	→ Dnipro-2 Dnipropetrovsk	1	(0)
2007–2012	Kryvbas Kryvyi Rih	116	(6)
2012	→ Naftovyk-Ukrnafta Okhtyrka (loan)	2	(0)
Total		548	(42)

Managerial career
- 2014–2021: Kolos Kovalivka
- 2022–2023: Aksu
- 2025–: Kolos Kovalivka
- * Club domestic league appearances and goals

Ruslan Volodymyrovych Kostyshyn (Ukrainian: Руслан Володимирович Костишин; born 8 January 1977) is a Ukrainian football coach and former professional footballer who played as a midfielder and current manager of Kolos Kovalivka.

== Career ==
Kostyshyn began his career in Podillya-Khmelnytskyi, from which he moved to play for CSKA Kyiv, Arsenal Kyiv, Dnipro and in 2007 he joined Kryvbas Kryvyi Rih. Kostyshyn played 270 matches in the Ukrainian Premier League and managed to score 26 goals. He is currently one of the vice-captains of the club, and captained Kryvbas four times.

=== Olympics ===
Kostyshyn represented Ukraine national team in the Olympics, during which he played 3 games.

=== Achievements ===
Team

- Ukrainian Premier League Bronze: 2004
- Ukrainian Cup Finalist 1998, 2000, 2003

== Personal ==
Ruslan has a brother Vitaliy Kostyshyn who plays football and later became a coach as well as his son Denys Kostyshyn also became footballer.

== Honours ==
Individual

- SportArena Coach of the Round: 2025–26 (Round 13),
- Ukraine Premier League Coach of the Round: 2025–26 (Round 13),
