= Vitaliy Ponomaryov =

Ukrainian manager

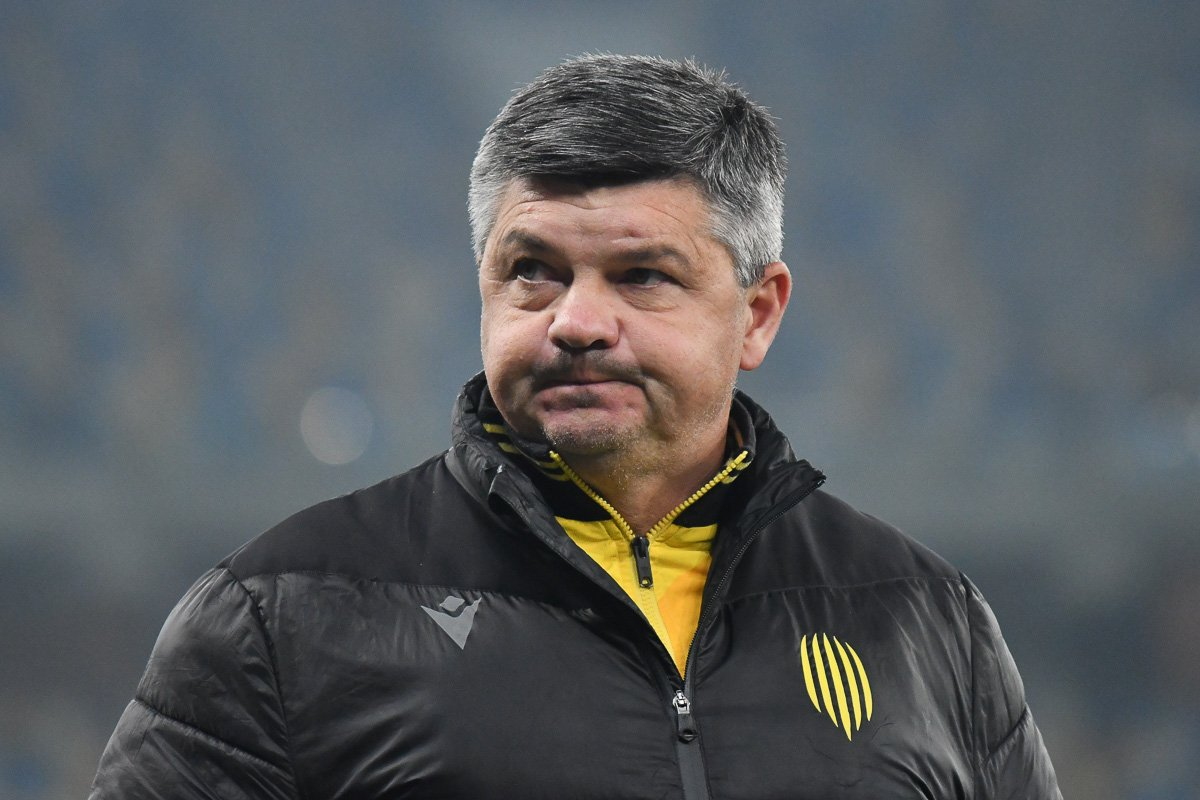

Personal information
- Full name: Vitaliy Yuriyovych Ponomaryov
- Date of birth: 7 December 1973 (age 52)
- Place of birth: Ukrainian SSR

Team information
- Current team: LNZ Cherkasy (manager)

Senior career*
Years	Team	Apps	(Gls)
1994–1995	LAZ Lviv	5	(1)

Managerial career
- 2016–2020: Mykolaiv
- 2018: Lviv Oblast
- 2023–2025: Rukh Lviv
- 2025–: LNZ Cherkasy
- * Club domestic league appearances and goals

Vitaliy Ponomaryov (Ukrainian: Віталій Юрійович Пономарьов; born 7 December 1973) is a Ukrainian football manager, former player and referee, who is currently manager of Ukrainian Premier League club LNZ Cherkasy.

== Playing career ==
He made his professional debut in the Ukrainian Third League in 1994 for LAZ Lviv.

== Refereeing career ==
From 2002 to 2010, Ponomaryov served as an assistant referee (linesman), refereeing in professional leagues including the Ukrainian Premier League from 2006 to 2010. According to some sources, he holds FIFA accreditation.

== Coaching and managerial career ==
In 2016, Ponomaryov became the manager of Mykolaiv which competes in Lviv Oblast amateur competitions. In 2018 he was appointed manager of the Lviv Oblast team which hosted one of the qualification groups for the 2019 UEFA Regions' Cup. In 2020 Ponomaryov managed Rukh Lviv's junior squad.

On 5 June 2025, Ponomaryov was announced as the manager of LNZ Cherkasy for the 2025–26 Ukrainian Premier League season.

== Honours ==
Individual

- Ukrainian Premier League Manager of the Month: May–June 2023, October 2025
- SportArena Coach of the Round: 2025–26 (Round 3, Round 6, Round 8, Round 12),
- Ukrainian Premier League Coach of the Round: 2025–26 (Round 3, Round 8, Round 12),
