= Vitaliy Kostyshyn =

Ukrainian footballer and manager

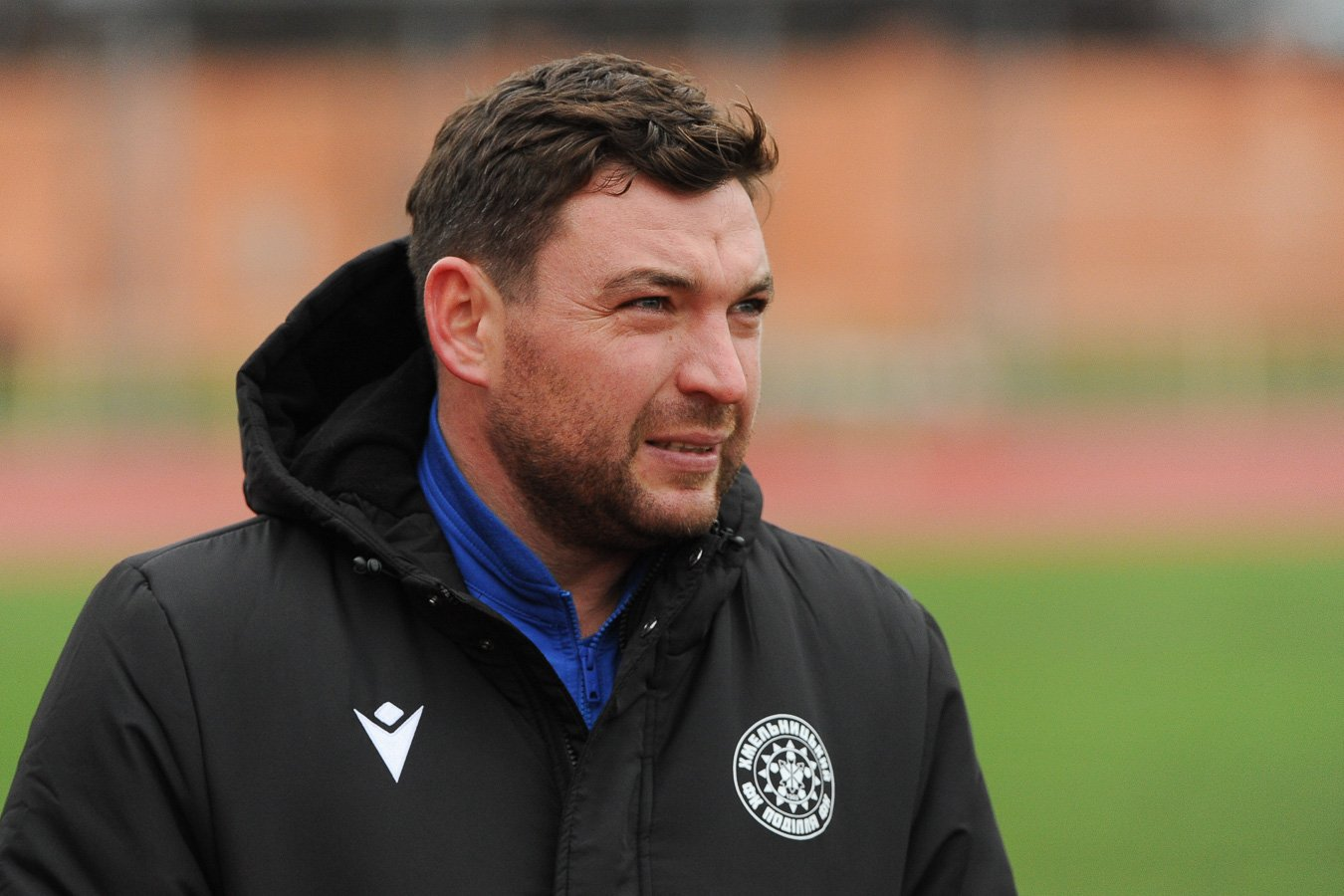

Personal information
- Full name: Vitaliy Volodymyrovych Kostyshyn
- Date of birth: 12 October 1986 (age 40)
- Place of birth: Khmelnytskyi, Ukrainian SSR
- Height: 1.82 m (5 ft 11 1/2 in)
- Position: Midfielder

Senior career*
Years	Team	Apps	(Gls)
2004–2006	Arsenal Kyiv	0	(0)
2004–2005	→ CSKA Kyiv (loan)	2	(0)
2006–2007	Kryvbas Kryvyi Rih	1	(0)
2007	Avanhard Sutysky (amateurs)	1	(0)
2009	Verest-INAPiK Dunaivtsi (amateurs)	4	(0)
2016–2017	Podillya Khmelnytskyi	22	(2)

Managerial career
- 2017: Podillya Khmelnytskyi (youth)
- 2017–2018: Podillya Khmelnytskyi (interim)
- 2018–2024: Podillya Khmelnytskyi
- 2025: Kudrivka (interim)
- 2025–2026: Kudrivka (youth)
- 2026–: Podillya Khmelnytskyi (sporting director)
- * Club domestic league appearances and goals

Vitaliy Volodymyrovych Kostyshyn (Ukrainian: Віталій Володимирович Костишин; born 12 October 1986) is a Ukrainian football coach and former professional football player who played as a midfielder, playing for different Ukrainian clubs.

== Managerial career ==
Since 2017 he is the manager of Podillya Khmelnytskyi. In 2025 he was appojnted as coach of Kudrivka (youth teams), but in February 2026, he was released and replaced by Oleksandr Protchenko. In February 2026 he was appinted as Sport Director of Podillya Khmelnytskyi.

== Personal life ==
Vitaliy Kostyshyn is the brother of former footballer and current manager Ruslan Kostyshyn.
