= Mladen Bartulović =

Croatian footballer

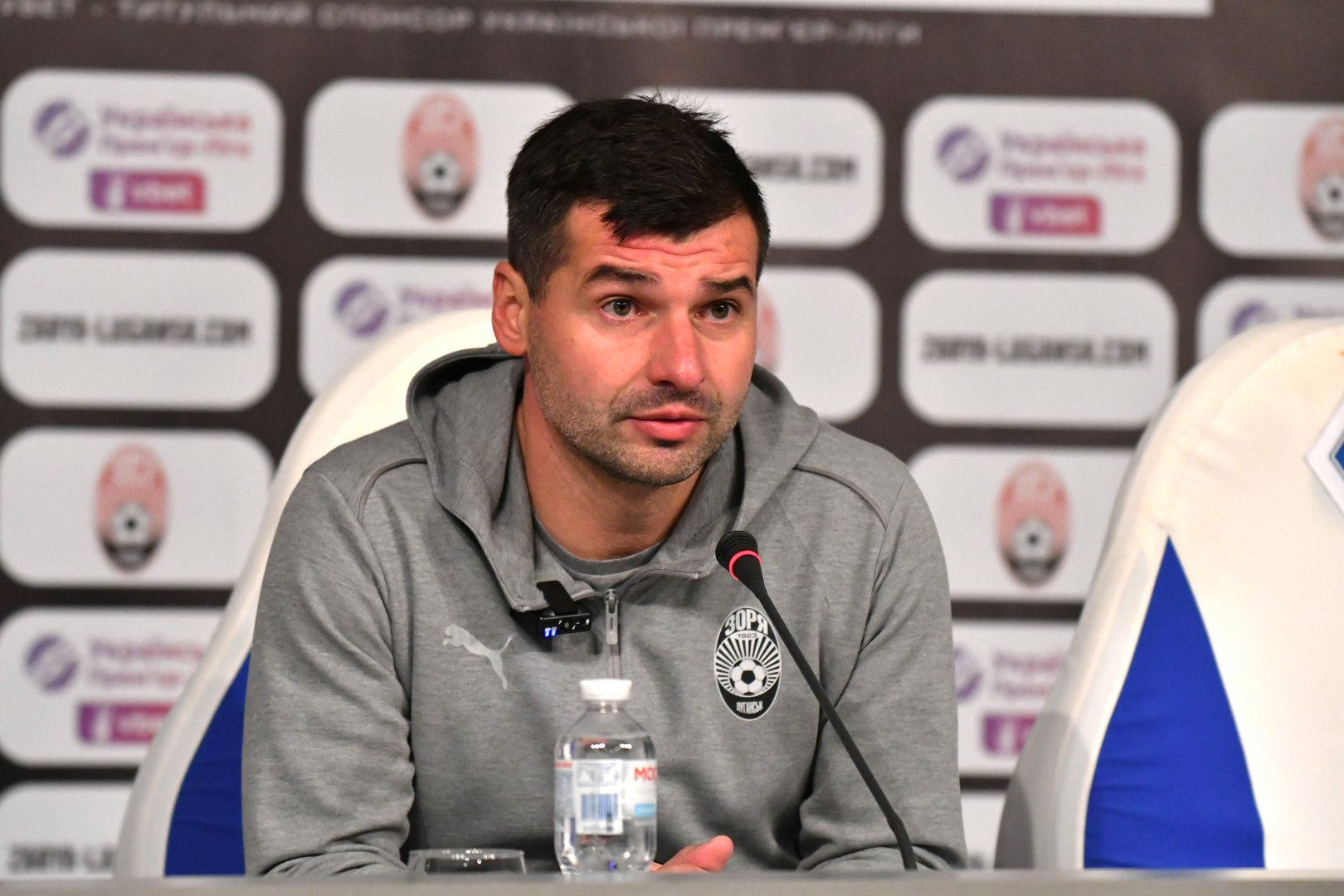

Personal information
- Date of birth: 5 October 1986 (age 40)
- Place of birth: Kakanj, SR Bosnia and Herzegovina, SFR Yugoslavia
- Height: 1.82 m (6 ft 0 in)
- Positions: Left winger; left-back

Team information
- Current team: Kharkiv (manager)

Youth career
- 1999–2001: Val Kaštel Stari
- 2001–2004: Hajduk Split

Senior career*
Years	Team	Apps	(Gls)
2004–2006	Hajduk Split	44	(3)
2006–2015	Dnipro Dnipropetrovsk	38	(0)
2008	→ Kryvbas Kryvyi Rih (loan)	26	(5)
2009–2010	→ Kryvbas Kryvyi Rih (loan)	27	(7)
2010–2011	→ Arsenal Kyiv (loan)	14	(2)
2011–2013	→ Kryvbas Kryvyi Rih (loan)	56	(7)
2013–2014	→ Karpaty Lviv (loan)	22	(7)
2015–2016	Vorskla Poltava	36	(1)
2017–2018	Miedź Legnica	30	(1)
2018	Miedź Legnica II	5	(0)
2018–2019	Volyn Lutsk	35	(8)
2020–2022	Inhulets Petrove	42	(8)
Total		374	(49)

International career
2006–2007	Croatia U21	5	(1)
2006–2009	Croatia	2	(0)

Managerial career
- 2022: Inhulets Petrove (assistant)
- 2022: Inhulets Petrove (caretaker)
- 2023: Inhulets Petrove (assistant)
- 2023: Zorya Luhansk (assistant)
- 2023: Zorya Luhansk (caretaker)
- 2023–2024: Zorya Luhansk (assistant)
- 2024–2025: Zorya Luhansk (caretaker)
- 2025–: Kharkiv
- * Club domestic league appearances and goals

Mladen Bartulović (born 5 October 1986) is a Croatian professional football manager and former player who is the manager of Kharkiv. He spent most of his playing career in Ukrainian Premier League representing various clubs from Central Ukraine: Kryvbas Kryvyi Rih, Vorskla Poltava, Inhulets Petrove, and others.

== Club career ==
Bartulović made his professional debut for Hajduk Split in 2004. In 2005 he appeared for the first time in continental competitions (UEFA Champions League). While the Hajduk's performance was poor at international stage, Bartulović was noticed by scouts. From 2006 he played in Ukraine.

At first Bartulović was a regular on the Dnipro's first team in 2006–07 season, but following seasons he started to play for the club's reserves and later was loaned to Dnipro's unofficial farm club Kryvbas, for which he capped over 100 games at the Ukrainian Premier League. In 2015–16 he played for Vorskla Poltava.

== International career ==
Bartulović made his debut for Croatia in a February 2006 friendly match against Hong Kong and earned a total of two caps. His second and final international was a November 2009 friendly against Liechtenstein.

== Coaching career ==
On 12 June 2025, Bartulović was appointed as the manager of Metalist 1925 Kharkiv.

== Personal life ==
His wife Natalya is a daughter of the Ukrainian football coach Serhiy Bashkyrov.

== Honors ==
Hajduk Split

- Croatian First League: 2004–05
- Croatian Super Cup: 2004, 2005

Dnipro Dnipropetrovsk

- UEFA Europa League: runner-up 2014–15

Miedź Legnica

- I liga: 2017–18

Inhulets Petrove

- Ukrainian First League: 2019–20

Individual

- Ukrainian Premier League Manager of the Month: September 2025
- Ukrainian Premier League Coach of the Round: 2025–26 (Round 5),
