= Vasyl Baranov =

Ukrainian footballer (born 1979)

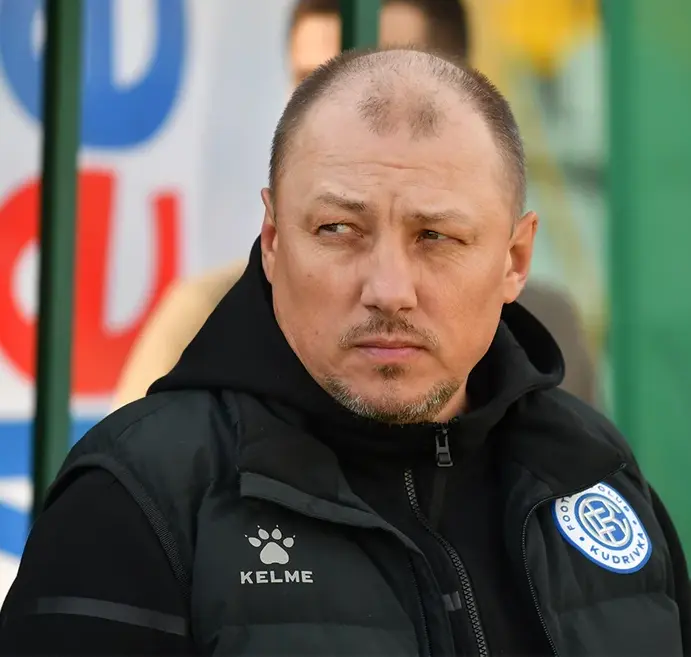

Personal information
- Full name: Vasyl Anatoliyovych Baranov
- Date of birth: 20 October 1979 (age 47)
- Place of birth: Voroshylovhrad, Ukrainian SSR, Soviet Union
- Height: 1.72 m (5 ft 8 in)
- Position: Winger

Senior career*
Years	Team	Apps	(Gls)
1996–2003	Zorya Luhansk	105	(15)
1998	→ Slovyanets Konotop (loan)	10	(1)
2003–2006	Dnepr Mogilev	84	(10)
2007	Smorgon	9	(0)
2008	Pärnu Vaprus	5	(1)
Total		213	(27)

Managerial career
- 2012–2022: Zorya Luhansk (assistant)
- 2022–2023: Vorskla Poltava (assistant)
- 2024: Kudrivka (interim)
- 2024–2026: Kudrivka
- 2026: Chernihiv
- * Club domestic league appearances and goals as of 15 June 2026

Vasyl Anatoliyovych Baranov (Ukrainian: Василь Анатолійович Баранов; born 20 October 1979) is a Ukrainian football manager and retired professional football player. He played as a midfielder for clubs in Ukraine, Belarus and Estonia.

== Career ==
Baranov began his playing career in the Ukrainian league, and played for clubs including Zorya Luhansk, Dnepr Mogilev, Smorgon and Pärnu Vaprus.

== Coach Career ==
In September 2024, he was again appointed as the interim coach of Kudrivka.

=== FC Kudrivka ===
In December 2024, he was appointed as coach of Kudrivka in Ukrainian First League. He led Kudrivka to secure promotion to the Ukrainian Premier League for the first time in their history. On 4 May 2026 he was sacked as coach of the club.

=== FC Chernihiv ===
On 15 June 2026, he signed one year contract with Chernihiv in Ukrainian First League. On 24 August 2026, after four draws in the Ukrainian First League and one victory in the Ukrainian Cup, his contract was terminated by mutual consent with FC Chernihiv.

== Honours ==
=== As a Player ===
Zorya Luhansk

- Ukrainian Second League: 2002–03

=== As a Coach ===
Individual

- Ukrainian Premier League Coach of the Month: August 2025
- Ukrainian Premier League Coach of the Round: 2025–26 (Round 1),
