= Fran Fernández =

Spanish football manager (born 1980)

Personal information
- Full name: Francisco Javier Fernández Díaz
- Date of birth: 20 March 1980 (age 46)
- Place of birth: Almería, Spain

Team information
- Current team: Karpaty Lviv (manager)

Managerial career
- Years: Team
- 2006–2007: Poli Aguadulce
- 2009–2011: Parador
- 2012–2016: Almería (youth)
- 2016–2018: Almería B
- 2017: Almería (interim)
- 2017: Almería (interim)
- 2018–2019: Almería
- 2019–2020: Alcorcón
- 2020: Tenerife
- 2021–2023: Alcorcón
- 2024–2025: Murcia
- 2026–: Karpaty Lviv

Francisco Javier "Fran" Fernández Díaz (born 20 March 1980) is a Spanish professional football manager who is currently in charge of Ukrainian Premier League club Karpaty Lviv.

== Career ==
Fernández started his career at Polideportivo Aguadulce, as a director of football and manager. He subsequently acted as an assistant manager at Adra and Español Alquián before being named manager of Parador in 2009.

In November 2011, Fernández was appointed Héctor Berenguel's assistant at Poli Ejido in Segunda División B, but the club subsequently folded in the same campaign. The following July he joined Almería, initially in charge of the Cadete squad.

After progressing through the club's youth setup, Fernández was appointed manager of the reserves in Tercera División on 29 June 2016. On 28 February of the following year, he was named manager of the main squad, after the dismissal of Fernando Soriano.

Fernández's first professional match in charge occurred on 5 March 2017, a 2–1 Segunda División away win against Lugo. His tenure ended nine days later, after the appointment of Luis Miguel Ramis.

Fernández was in charge of the first team in an interim manner for one more occasion during the 2017–18 season, replacing fired Ramis. On 24 April 2018, after Lucas Alcaraz's resignation, he was appointed manager of the main squad until the end of the campaign, managing to avoid relegation in the last matchday on head-to-head points with Cultural Leonesa.

On 20 May 2019, after taking his club to a comfortable mid-table finish, Fernández announced that he would not renew his contract with the Rojiblancos, due to expire in June. On 1 July, he took over fellow league team Alcorcón, replacing the fired Cristóbal Parralo.

Fernández left Alkor as his contract expired, and was appointed at the helm of Tenerife on 29 July 2020. He was relieved of his duties on 22 November, after a 0–1 home loss against Logroñés.

On 2 November 2021, Fernández returned to Alkor, becoming their third manager of the season with the side rock-bottom of the standings. Despite suffering relegation, he remained in charge of the club, and renewed his contract for a further year on 30 June 2023, after returning to the second level at first attempt.

Fernández was sacked on 4 December 2023, with Alcorcón in the relegation zone. The following 24 June, he took over at Primera Federación side Real Murica on a contract until the end of the campaign; he replaced Pablo Alfaro, who left the club a few hours later.

On 30 June 2025, after missing out promotion in the play-offs, Fernández left Murcia.

== Managerial statistics ==
As of match played 23 May 2026

Managerial record by team and tenure
Team	Nat	From	To	Record								Ref
Team	Nat	From	To	G	W	D	L	GF	GA	GD	Win %	Ref
Almería B	(Spain)	29 June 2016	24 April 2018	79	46	16	17	152	68	+84	58.23	
Almería (interim)	(Spain)	28 February 2017	14 March 2017	2	1	1	0	2	1	+1	50.00	
Almería (interim)	(Spain)	13 November 2017	18 November 2017	1	1	0	0	3	0	+3	100.00	
Almería	(Spain)	24 April 2018	10 June 2019	52	19	19	14	63	55	+8	36.54	
Alcorcón	(Spain)	1 July 2019	23 July 2020	43	13	18	12	52	51	+1	30.23	
Tenerife	(Spain)	29 July 2020	22 November 2020	13	3	4	6	8	12	−4	23.08	
Alcorcón	(Spain)	2 November 2021	4 December 2023	94	32	30	32	107	106	+1	34.04	
Murcia	(Spain)	24 June 2024	30 June 2025	41	18	12	11	49	34	+15	43.90	
Karpaty Lviv	(Ukraine)	8 January 2026	Present	14	6	4	4	20	10	+10	42.86	
Total				339	139	104	96	456	337	+119	41.00	—
