= Peter Itodo =

Nigerian footballer

Personal information
- Full name: Peter Mandela Itodo
- Date of birth: 1 July 2003 (age 23)
- Place of birth: Ajegunle, Lagos, Nigeria
- Position: Forward

Team information
- Current team: Metalist 1925 Kharkiv
- Number: 98

Youth career
- Santoma
- Super Angels FA
- 2020–2022: The Charlesann
- 2022: City FC Abuja
- 2023: Klassisch

Senior career*
Years	Team	Apps	(Gls)
2023–2024	Luzi 2008	33	(19)
2024–2025	Dinamo City	28	(12)
2025–	Metalist 1925 Kharkiv	33	(14)
- * Club domestic league appearances and goals as of 21 October 2026

Peter Mandela Itodo (born 1 July 2003), commonly known as Peter Itodo, is a Nigerian professional footballer who plays as a forward for Ukrainian Premier League club Metalist 1925 Kharkiv.

== Career ==
=== Early career ===
Born in Ajegunle, in Lagos to parents from Benue State, Itodo began playing football as a young child through local football clubs and academies. He signed his first professional contract with Albanian club Luzi 2008 ahead of the 2023–24 Kategoria e Parë season, which is the second tier of football in Albania. He scored on his debut with the club, in a 1–1 draw against Flamurtari on the opening day of the season. He would go on to score 19 goals in 33 games for Luzi 2008 and become the league's top goalscorer, but his side were eventually relegated after finishing in penultimate place.

=== Dinamo City ===
Itodo joined Kategoria Superiore club Dinamo City on 27 May 2024, signing a 3-year contract with the club.

== Honours ==
=== Club ===
Dinamo

- Kupa e Shqipërisë
  - Winner:2024–25

== Career statistics ==
=== Club ===
As of 6 January 2024

Club	Season	League			Cup		Continental		Other		Total	
Club	Season	Division	Apps	Goals	Apps	Goals	Apps	Goals	Apps	Goals	Apps	Goals
Luzi United	2023–24	Kategoria e Parë	33	19	2	0	—				35	19
Luzi United	Total		33	19	2	0	—				35	19
Dinamo City	2024–25	Kategoria Superiore	26	12	4	8	—				30	20
Dinamo City	Total		26	12	4	8	—				30	20
Career total			59	31	6	8	0	0	0	0	65	39
