= Oleksandr Saputin =

Ukrainian footballer

Personal information
- Full name: Oleksandr Ihorovych Saputin
- Date of birth: 13 November 2003 (age 22)
- Place of birth: Ukraine
- Height: 1.97 m (6 ft 6 in)
- Position: Goalkeeper

Team information
- Current team: Zorya Luhansk
- Number: 1

Youth career
- 2016–2020: Dnipro
- 2020–2022: Zorya Luhansk

Senior career*
Years	Team	Apps	(Gls)
2022–	Zorya Luhansk	74	(0)

International career^{‡}
2023	Ukraine U21	1	(0)
- * Club domestic league appearances and goals as of 3 June 2026 ‡ National team caps and goals as of 25 April 2026

Oleksandr Ihorovych Saputin (Ukrainian: Олександр Ігорович Сапутін; born 13 November 2003) is a Ukrainian professional footballer who plays as a goalkeeper for the Ukrainian Premier League club Zorya Luhansk.

== Club career ==
A youth product of Dnipro from 2016 to 2020, Saputin joined the youth academy of Zorya Luhansk in the summer of 2020. He signed his first professional contract with the club on 15 January 2022 until 2025. He made his senior and professional debut with Zorya in a 3–2 Ukrainian Premier League win over FC Vorskla Poltava on 5 March 2023. In the 2022–23 season, he started making appearances as a starter and earned international recognition from the CIES Football Observatory in April 2023.
