= Vladyslav Moroz =

Ukrainian footballer (born 2001)

Personal information
- Full name: Vladyslav Vasylyovych Moroz
- Date of birth: 4 October 2001 (age 25)
- Place of birth: Ternopil, Ukraine
- Height: 1.80 m (5 ft 11 in)
- Position: Centre-back

Team information
- Current team: Epitsentr Kamianets-Podilskyi
- Number: 4

Youth career
- 2014–2016: Ternopil
- 2016–2018: Skala Stryi

Senior career*
Years	Team	Apps	(Gls)
2018–2022	Volyn Lutsk	12	(0)
2020–2021	→ Volyn-2 Lutsk	20	(0)
2022–	Epitsentr Kamianets-Podilskyi	88	(6)
- * Club domestic league appearances and goals as of 3 June 2026

Vladyslav Vasylyovych Moroz (Ukrainian: Владислав Васильович Мороз; born 4 October 2001) is a Ukrainian professional footballer who plays as a centre-back for Ukrainian club Epitsentr Kamianets-Podilskyi.
