= Ihor Kostyuk =

Ukrainian football player and manager

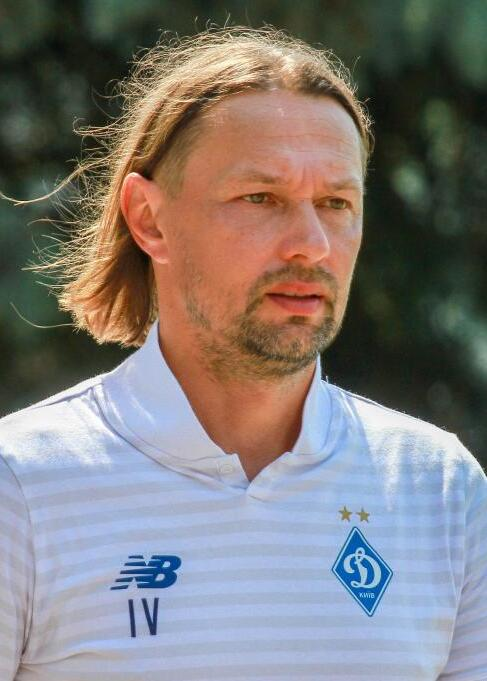

Personal information
- Full name: Ihor Volodymyrovych Kostyuk
- Date of birth: 14 September 1975 (age 51)
- Place of birth: Kyiv, Ukrainian SSR
- Height: 1.86 m (6 ft 1 in)
- Position: Midfielder

Senior career*
Years	Team	Apps	(Gls)
1993–1997	Dynamo Kyiv	13	(1)
1993–1996	→ Dynamo-2 Kyiv	102	(20)
1997	→ Tyumen (loan)	3	(0)
1997–1999	Vorskla Poltava	62	(16)
1997–1999	→ Vorskla-2 Poltava	5	(0)
2000–2002	Dynamo Kyiv	6	(0)
2000	→ Dynamo-2 Kyiv	11	(2)
2000	→ Vorskla Poltava (loan)	9	(0)
2001	→ Zakarpattia Uzhhorod (loan)	3	(0)
2002	→ Dynamo-2 Kyiv	12	(0)
2002−2005	Arsenal Kyiv	34	(4)
2002–2004	→ Borysfen Boryspil (loan)	24	(3)
2003	→ Borysfen-2 Boryspil (loan)	1	(0)
2006–2009	CSKA Kyiv	59	(14)
Total		344	(60)

International career
1994	Ukraine U18	1	(0)
1996	Ukraine U21	1	(0)
2000	Ukraine	1	(0)

Managerial career
- 2017–2025: Dynamo Kyiv U19
- 2025–2026: Dynamo Kyiv
- * Club domestic league appearances and goals

Ihor Volodymyrovych Kostyuk (Ukrainian: Ігор Володимирович Костюк; born 14 September 1975) is a Ukrainian professional football manager and former player. He was most recently the head coach of Ukrainian Premier League club Dynamo Kyiv.

== Career ==
A native of Kyiv, Kostyuk began at the Lokomotyv Kyiv sports school, which at the time was fielding junior teams in the city's competitions. He was spotted by another coach of the Dynamo football school, Oleksandr Shpakov, and brought to the Dynamo academy.

He made his professional debut in 1992 for the reserves.

In 2009, he played for CSKA Kyiv until the club was dissolved, and Kostyuk ended his active football career. Later in 2014, he participated in the Ukrainian Amateur Cup with a team of football veterans, Yevrobis-Ahrobiznes Kyiv.

== Coaching career ==
=== Dynamo Kyiv ===
Kostyuk managed the under-19 squad of Dynamo Kyiv. In December 2025, he was appointed head coach of Dynamo's senior team. He was relieved of his duties on 18 October 2026.

== Honours ==
=== Player ===
Dynamo Kyiv

- Ukrainian Premier League: 1995–96

=== Manager ===
Dynamo Kyiv

- Ukrainian Cup: 2025–26
