= Volodymyr Geninson =

Former president of the Ukrainian Premier League

UEFA delegate to European tournaments FIFA Commissioner in the international arena

Personal details
- Born: May 12, 1976 (age 50) Kyiv, Soviet Union (now Ukraine)

Volodymyr Geninson (Ukrainian: Володимир Братіславович Генінсон; born 12 May 1976) is the former president of the Ukrainian Premier League. Former executive director of the Ukrainian Football Federation. UEFA delegate to European tournaments, FIFA Commissioner in the international arena.

== Biography ==
Geninson was born on 12 May 1976 in Kyiv. He got his degree abroad by graduating Champlain College in 2001 in Burlington, Vermont. He started his career working in international hotels group Howard Johnson's and InterContinental. Having got experience in administration abroad, Geninson came back to Ukraine and headed Catering and service department Hyatt Regency Kyiv Hotel. After that he held the post of Development director in management company Vertex Hotel Group.

From 2011 to 2013, Geninson headed the State Concern Ukrsportarena, under whose management there were major infrastructure projects of the NSC Olimpiyskiy, Kyiv Palace of Sports and Arena Lviv.

Under the leadership of Geninson in Kyiv, the main sports complex of the country NSC Olimpiyskiy was restored and opened, and the Lviv stadium "Arena Lviv" was built. Today he is the Honorary President of the NSC Olimpiyskiy.

During the year of work at the NSC Olimpiyskiy, Geninson managed to bring the stadium to self-sufficiency. According to the results of 2012, the NSC Olimpiyskiy received a profit of UAH 1.5 million. The concept of the development of the NSC was to use its infrastructure not only for sporting events, but also for concerts, festivals, and other commercial events.

Volodymyr Geninson took an active part in the work of the agency for the preparation and holding in Ukraine of the final part of the EURO 2012. He lobbied for the interests of Ukraine at the preparatory stage, and was also responsible for holding EURO 2012 matches in Kyiv and Lviv.

From March to December 2015, Geninson held the post of executive director of FFU, and from December 2015 he is the head of the FIFA and UEFA Interaction Service. February 29, 2016 at the General Meeting of Participants of the Ukrainian Football Premier League he has been elected as its new president. Under the leadership of Geninson, UPL has passed the stage of transformation, starting from rebranding, ending with attracting national and world sponsors for Ukrainian football clubs.

These steps allowed them to fully offset the cost of maintaining the UPL.

Currently, he is a member of the UEFA Committee concerning security and development of stadiums in Ukraine, a member of the ESSMA Committee (the European Stadium & Safety Management Association) in Ukraine.

== See also ==
- Alexander Granovskiy
- Boris Kaufman (businessman)

Sporting positions
Preceded by Vitaliy Danilov	President of Ukrainian Premier League; 2016–2018	Succeeded by Thomas Grimm
