= Boris Kaufman (disambiguation) =

Boris Kaufman (1906–1980) was a Polish cinematographer.

Other people named Boris Kaufman include:

- Boris Kaufman (businessman) (born 1973), Ukrainian businessman
- Boris Kaufman (rabbi), Birobidzhan rabbi
