= Tedis Ukraine =

Ukrainian tobacco company

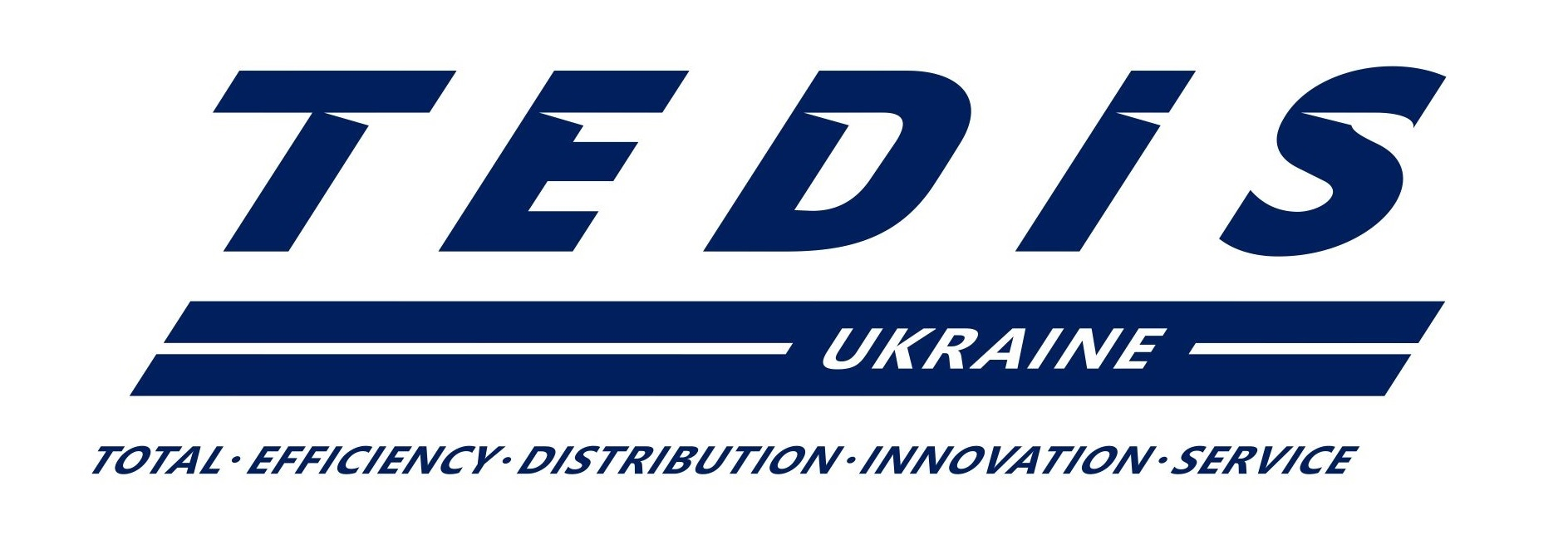
- Industry: tobacco
- Founded: 2010
- Founder: Igor Kesaev
- Number of employees: 2500
- Website: tedis.ua

Tedis Ukraine (Ukrainian: Тедіс-Україна), earlier Metropolis Ukraine (Ukrainian: Мегаполіс-Україна), is the Ukrainian largest tobacco and related products distributor. In 2013–2015, it was de facto monopoly on Ukrainian tobacco market with 99% share of it; in 2020, its share decreased to less than 75%.

== History ==
Metropolis Ukraine was founded in 2010 as a subsidiary of the Russian company Megapolis, owned by Russian businessman Igor Kesaev, after he purchased two largest tobacco companies of West Ukraine. In 2010, Metropolis Ukraine controlled 50% of the Ukrainian tobacco market.

In 2012–2013, international tobacco companies Philip Morris International, Japan Tobacco International, Imperial Tobacco and British American Tobacco switched from independent distribution in Ukraine to the distribution via Megapolis-Ukraine. These four companies produce 90% of cigarettes in Ukraine. Megapolis Ukraine purchased main other tobacco distributors of Ukraine and became de facto monopoly that controls more than 99% of the Ukrainian tobacco market.

In 2014, after annexation of Crimea by the Russian Federation, Russian companies in Ukraine, including Metropolis Ukraine, faced problems. In 2015, Kesaev's representatives announced that he had quit Ukrainian business. At the end of 2015, a part of Megapolis Ukraine was sold to Boris Kaufman, a businessman from Odesa.

In 2016, there was a scandal with Metropolis Ukraine, because Degtyaryov Plant, also owned by Kesaev, allegedly supplied weapons to the separatists in the War in Donbass. The warehouses of Megapolis Ukraine in six cities were blocked by activists. The company management claimed that Russian shareholders withdrew from it. After the scandal, the company changed its name to Tedis Ukraine.

=== Anti-Monopoly litigation ===
In 2017, Anti-Monopoly Committee of Ukraine (AMC) accused Tedis Ukraine of monopolizing the Ukrainian tobacco market. Tax evasion and terrorist financing have also been claimed. According to Prosecutor General of Ukraine Yuriy Lutsenko, in 2015—2017 there were 2.5 billion hryvnias that were transferred from Ukraine into Russia through several companies, including Tedis Ukraine, and “some of them were used to fund the terrorist organizations LPR and DPR."

In 2017, Tedis Ukraine was fined 300 million hryvnias after the court proceedings initiated by AMC, and in 2019 it was fined 3,4 billion hryvnias more. AMC announced its intention to forcefully split the company, but in December 2019 AMC lost the court with the company.

On February 2, 2021, the Supreme Court of Ukraine satisfied the claim of Tedis Ukraine and canceled the decision of the AMC in 2019 on the fine of Tedis Ukraine in the amount of ₴3.4 billion.

In October 2025, Ukrainian courts satisfied application of the Antimonopoly Committee of Ukraine and seized funds of Tedis Ukraine in the amount of UAH 548 million.

== Description ==
Tedis Ukraine is the Ukrainian distributor of international companies Philip Morris International, Japan Tobacco International, Imperial Tobacco and British American Tobacco, which make 99% of their sales in Ukraine through Tedis Ukraine. The purchased tobacco products are resold to 40-50 wholesale companies and 80,000 retail companies.

As of 2020, Tedis Ukraine had 35 regional branches with 2,500 employees. In 2016 it paid 9 billion hryvnias in taxes, becoming one of the five largest taxpayers of Ukraine. In 2013, Megapolis Ukraine's revenue was 27.5 billion hryvnia, and it ranked fifth in the Forbes Ukraine 200 largest companies of Ukraine.

As of 2017, among the owners of Tedis Ukraine were Boris Kaufman (47.22%), as well as British citizens Richard Duxbury (23.51%) and Richard Dorian Fenhalls.
