= Vertex United =

Ukrainian business group

- Company type: Private company
- Founded: 2003; 22 years ago
- Founders: Borys Kaufman; Oleksandr Hranovskyi
- Headquarters: Ukraine
- Key people: Borys Kaufman; Oleksandr Hranovskyi
- Products: Property and media business
- Website: vertexunited.com

Vertex United is a Ukrainian business group owned by Borys Kaufman and Oleksandr Hranovskyi. It has a number of assets in hospitality, media business and finance.

== Hotel business ==
Vertex Hotel Group manages hotel facilities: "Bristol", "Londonska" in Odesa and "President Hotel" in Kyiv.

The Passage Hotel Complex came under the control of the group in 2003, when Passage CJSC was established, the shareholders of which were Ukrbudservice LLC and Clear Water Bay Hotels (United States), both owned by Hranovskyi and Kaufman. Instead of the hotel building, which the city transferred to the statutory fund of the CJSC, it owned 35% of the shares. Kaufman and Hranovskyi, instead of 65% of the shares, had to spend $11 million over 3 years to complete the reconstruction of the complex.

Until 2013, investors did not begin reconstruction, this was explained by the financial crisis. In July 2013, the Odesa City Council decided to sell 24.6% of the remaining shares in the city to businessmen.

== Media business ==
In June 2013, Vertex United acquired the media project "Focus" (magazine "Focus", "Focus. Beautiful Country", website focus.ua) from the media holding UMH group. Until recently, Borys Kaufman and Oleksandr Hranovskyi controlled the Odesa RIAK TV channel, but, according to some sources, sold it to the former mayor of Odesa, Oleksiy Kostusev.

== FC Chornomorets Odesa ==
From January 1, 2022, Vertex United is owner of the football club Chornomorets from Odesa. On January 9, 2022, the company's representative Volodymyr Heninson took part in a press conference of the club's new head coach Roman Hryhorchuk.
