= Vitaliy Danilov =

Ukrainian football executive

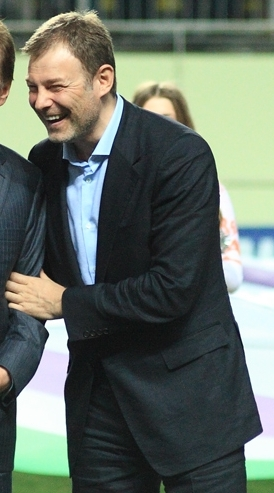

President of Ukrainian Premier League
- In office 27 May 2008 – 29 February 2016
- Preceded by: post created
- Succeeded by: Volodymyr Heninson

Personal details
- Born: June 10, 1967 (age 58) Velykyi Oleksandriv, Vinkivtsi Raion, Khmelnytskyi Oblast, Soviet Union (now Ukraine)

Vitaliy Danilov is the former president of Ukrainian Premier League (2008–2016) and honorary president of FC Kharkiv (2005–2010). Danilov is a former member of Ukrainian parliament (Verkhovna Rada).

== Biography ==
Vitaliy Danilov was born June 10, 1967, in Ukraine. He graduated from the Kyiv National University with degree in fitness education and sport. He continued graduate studies at Kharkiv Economic University. Danilov is a former member of Ukrainian parliament (Verkhovna Rada).

=== Political career ===
In the 2002 Ukrainian parliamentary election Danilov failed to get elected to parliament as a candidate of Yabluko (placed 36th on their election list). In this election Yabluko won 1.2% of the popular vote and no seats.

In 2007 Ukrainian parliamentary election Danilov was first elected into parliament on the party list of Bloc Yulia Tymoshenko. In 2012 he was re-elected into parliament on the party list of Batkivshchyna (number 57 on this list). In the 2014 Ukrainian parliamentary election Danilov was not re-elected into parliament; because he placed 21st on the electoral list of Batkivshchina, and the party won 17 seats on the electoral list and 2 constituency seats.

In the 2019 Ukrainian parliamentary election Danilov returned to parliament; after being placed 16th on the electoral list of Batkivshchina. In these snap parliamentary election Batkivschyna received 8.18% of the votes and 26 MPs (two elected in constituencies).

On 8 December 2023 parliament officially terminated his parliamentary mandate at his own request (of 25 November 2023). Next on the Batkivschyna 2019 election list Mykhaylo Sokolov took his place in parliament and in the Batkivschyna-faction on 20 December 2023.

=== Premier League of Ukraine ===
Vitaliy Danilov was elected as a temporary acting president on May 27, 2008, when top 16 Ukrainian football clubs declared about Ukrainian Premier League launch.

On July 1, 2009, Danilov won the election and became the league president without 'temporary acting' prefix.

But in July 2009, five Premier League clubs: Arsenal (Kyiv), Dynamo (Kyiv), Dnipro (Dnipropetrovsk), Kryvbas (Kryvy Rih), and Metalist (Kharkiv) declared that the elections of the League's president were illegal due to procedure infraction. The representatives of the above-mentioned clubs did not recognize Vitaliy Danilov as the president.

To resolve this conflict Vitaliy Danilov initiated in September 2009 re-election of the League's president and on December 1, 2009, won the election again with 11 clubs voted for his candidature, 3 (Arsenal, Dynamo, Metalist) – against, 1 (Kryvbas) abstain, and 1 (FC Dnipro) – absent. This time most presidents of the Premier League of Ukraine acknowledged Vitaliy Danilov legality.

Sporting positions
Preceded by post created	President of Ukrainian Premier League; 2008–2016	Succeeded by Volodymyr Heninson
Preceded by new post	President of FC Kharkiv; 2005–2010	Succeeded by post disbanded
