= Mykhaylo Sokolov =

Ukrainian politician

- Михайло Соколов
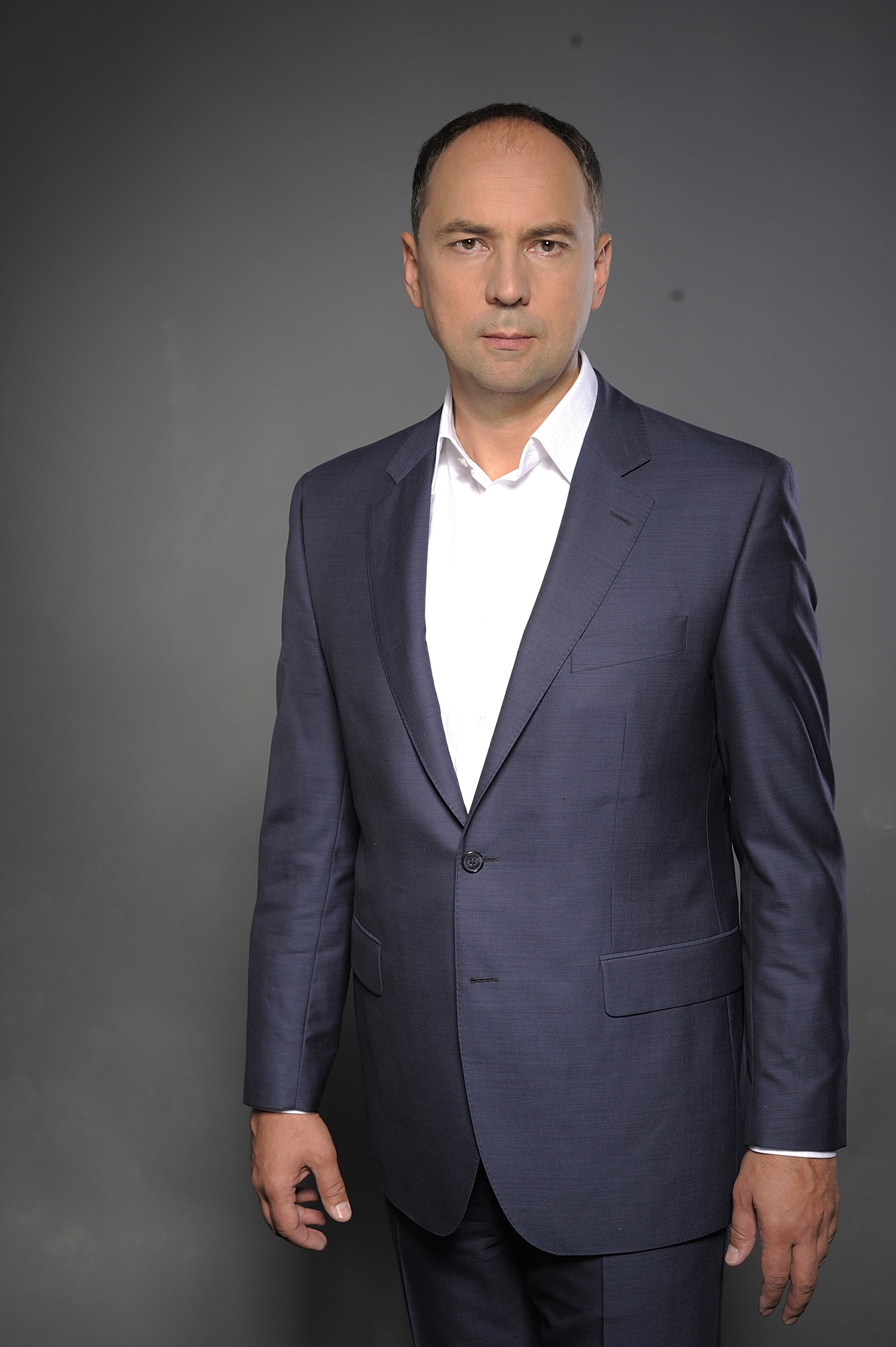
- Born: Dnipro, Ukraine
- Education: Oles Honchar Dnipro National University
- Occupation: politician

Sokolov Mykhaylo Volodymyrovych (Ukrainian: Соколов Михайло Володимирович) (born 27 November 1967, in Dnipro, Ukraine) is a Ukrainian politician, People's Deputy of Ukraine from 2007 to 2012 and was elected to the Ukrainian parliament in December 2023.

== Biography ==
In 1985, he graduated from high school No. 67 with a mathematical profile. In 1991, he graduated from Oles Honchar Dnipro National University with a degree in spacecraft Mechanical Engineering.

From 1991 to 1997, he worked as a master design engineer at Yuzhmash (Production Association Yuzhny Machine-Building Plant).

From 1997 to 1999, Sokolov worked as deputy director of Ukr-farm. In 1999–2000, he served as a deputy director of Optimafarm. Sokolov's career continued at the Evist enterprise, where he also worked as a deputy director until 2005. He was the director of development of the enterprise SDS. For the next three years, until October 2007, he was the head of Technopharma.

In 2001, Sokolov initiated a program of providing Dnipro city with drinking water, got the Diploma International Academic Rating of Popularity and Quality Gold Fortune, Nominee for The Best Project award.

In 2002, he began his political career, and he was elected twice as a deputy of the Dnipro City Council.

== Social and political activity ==
From 2002 to 2007, Sokolov served as a deputy of the Dnipro City Council during the 4th and 5th convocations. During his term as a deputy, he co-created a program to provide accessible drinking water to Dnipro by initiating the creation of open auctions for the sale of land lease rights.

From 2004–2012, he was the President of the Association for the Promotion of Cinematography in Ukraine.

From 23 November 2007 to 12 December 2012, he was a Member of the Verkhovna Rada (Parliament of Ukraine) of the VI convocation (Batkivshchyna All-Ukrainian Union), Member of the Committee on Justice, member of the Special Control Committee on Privatization (December 2007).

In 2008–2009, as a Member of Parliament, he participated in the abolition of the visa regime between Ukraine and the State of Israel. In February 2013, on behalf of the United Opposition he created the human rights NGO All-Ukrainian Commission of Justice together with the People's Deputies of Ukraine. He was elected chairman of this commission. The commission collected and submitted to the President of Ukraine more than 5000 signatures for the release of Yulia Tymoshenko, and other Ukrainian political prisoners.

In April 2015, he co-organized the Social Platform Everyone Matters with a program of socially oriented reforms.

In September 2014, he headed the Mykolaiv Regional Organization of the Batkivshchyna political party. In the same year, he organized the Prayer Group in the Verkhovna Rada of the VIII convocation.

From 2014 to 2017, he was the President of the Trident Foundation for the Advancement of Ukraine in Washington. In December 2014, he organized the visit of Jim Slattery, the President of the US Congressmen's Association to Kyiv as part of a campaign to protect the family estate of aircraft designer Igor Sikorsky and to create a museum there.

On 25 October 2015 he was elected a deputy of the Mykolaiv regional council from Batkivshchyna party. From November 2015 to September 2016 — First Deputy Chairman of the Mykolaiv Regional Council.

Sokolov has been a Member of the Chamber of Commerce and Industry of Ukraine since 21 December 2016. He was awarded the honors of the Ministry of Internal Affairs of Ukraine and the Ukrainian Orthodox Church.

In the 2019 Ukrainian parliamentary election Sokolov failed to return to parliament; after being placed 25th on the electoral list of Batkivshchina. In these snap parliamentary election Batkivschyna received 8.18% of the votes and 26 MPs (two elected in constituencies).

Sokolov is the Chairman of the NGO Support Center of National Defense Capability of Ukraine since 2018.

As of 2021, he is deputy director of Ukrtranzit LLC.

On 8 December 2023 parliament officially terminated the parliamentary mandate of elected for Batkivshchina MP Vitaliy Danilov at Danilov's own request (of 25 November 2023). Next on the Batkivschyna 2019 election list Sokolov took his place in parliament and in the Batkivschyna-faction on 20 December 2023.

== Family ==
His father is Volodymyr Sokolov, Hero of Socialist Labor, chief engineer of Yuzhmash from 1982 to 1987.

Mykhailo Sokolov is married and has five children.

== See also ==
- Batkivshchyna
