= Ukrainian Premier League =

Highest division of Ukrainian annual football championship

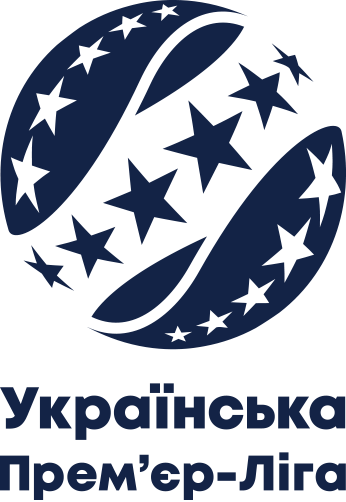
- Founded: 1991; 35 years ago as Vyshcha Liha; 2008; 18 years ago as Ukrainska Premier Liha
- Country: Ukraine
- Confederation: UEFA
- Number of clubs: 16
- Level on pyramid: 1
- Relegation to: Ukrainian First League
- Domestic cups: Ukrainian Cup; Ukrainian Super Cup
- International cups: UEFA Champions League; UEFA Europa League; UEFA Conference League
- Current champions: Shakhtar Donetsk (16th title) (2025–26)
- Most championships: Dynamo Kyiv (17 titles)
- Most appearances: Oleksandr Shovkovskyi (426)
- Top scorer: Andriy Yarmolenko (125)
- Broadcasters: Ukraine: UPL.TV; International: See list
- Website: upl.ua
- Current: 2026–27 Ukrainian Premier League

The Ukrainian Premier League (Ukrainian: Українська Прем'єр-ліга [ʊkrɐˈjinʲsʲkɐ preˈmjɛr ˈl⁽ʲ⁾iɦɐ]) or UPL is a professional association football league in Ukraine and the highest level of the Ukrainian football league system.

Originally known as the Vyshcha Liha (Вища ліга [ˈwɪʃtʃɐ ˈl⁽ʲ⁾iɦɐ], lit. 'Higher League') it was formed in 1991, after the fall of the Soviet Union, and the consequent discontinuation of the Soviet Top League. In the first season in 1992, the Ukrainian league included the Ukraine-based clubs that competed previously in the Soviet top three tiers competitions, as well as better clubs of the Ukrainian republican competitions. The initial season of the league featured six former Soviet Top League clubs among which were Dynamo Kyiv, Shakhtar Donetsk, Chornomorets Odesa, Dnipro, Metalist Kharkiv, Metalurh Zaporizhzhia, as well as four more clubs that previously also competed at the top league. The first edition was played during the first semester of the year, as it was decided to synchronise the Ukrainian football calendar with most European leagues. That first tournament was won by Tavriya Simferopol, a club based in Crimea. That was the only edition of the league not won by either Dynamo or Shakhtar.

The Ukrainian Premier League is also a public organization of professional clubs. In 1996 along with the other professional football leagues of Ukraine, a council of the Vyshcha Liha (Top League) clubs became a member of the Professional Football League of Ukraine. In 2008 was withdrawn from Professional Football League of Ukraine and reformed into a separate self-governed entity of the Ukrainian Association of Football (previously Football Federation of Ukraine), officially changing its name to the current one.

As a leading club of the Soviet Top League, Dynamo Kyiv dominated the league in the 1990s, winning nine consecutive titles from 1993 to 2001, while since the mid-2000s the league has been contested between Dynamo and Shakhtar Donetsk. Three Ukrainian clubs have reached the finals of European club competitions: Dynamo (as Soviet club), Shakhtar and Dnipro. Among Ukrainian fans the most popular Ukrainian clubs are Dynamo Kyiv and Shakhtar Donetsk. Other popular clubs include Karpaty Lviv, Metalist Kharkiv, Chornomorets Odesa and Dnipro. The league was ranked the 12th highest in Europe by UEFA in 2021, however since the Russian invasion, the league has fallen to 23rd.

Since 2014, the operation of the league has been disrupted greatly on account of the Russo-Ukrainian War, worsening with the full scale Russian invasion of Ukraine in 2022. The league has been affected by destruction of its sports infrastructure, many Ukrainian players choosing to join the military, and disruption to match attendances with games played behind closed doors, and many other facets of the league's operation.

== General overview and format ==
The 2023–24 season is the league's sixteenth after the restructuring of professional club football in 2008 and the 33rd season since the establishing of professional club competitions independent from the Soviet Union. As of 2024, Shakhtar Donetsk is the reigning Ukrainian Premier League champion. To summarise, Tavriya Simferopol won the first championship, while all the subsequent titles have gone to either Dynamo Kyiv or Shakhtar Donetsk. Only 2 teams, Dynamo Kyiv and Shakhtar Donetsk, have participated in all previous 33 Ukrainian Top League competitions. The central feature of the league is a game between the same Dynamo and Shakhtar, which developed into the Klasychne (Classic).

On 15 April 2008 the new Premier-Liha (Premier League) was formed. It consists of 12 football clubs that take control of the league's operations under the statues of Football Federation of Ukraine, UEFA, and FIFA. With the new reorganization the format of the League was preserved, while the changes that were made were exclusively administrative. Competitions continued to be conducted in a double round robin format among 16 clubs. There were a couple of seasons when the league experimented with a 14 club composition.

In 2014, the league was reduced to 12 members, while its format has changed. The season is still being played in a double round robin in the first half of a season, after which the league splits in half into two groups of six teams. Both the top six and the bottom six play another a double round robin tournament with the clubs of their grouping. For 2019-20 a post-season play-off for qualification for the European club competitions was introduced.

The teams that reach the top ranks of the competition table at the end of each season, gain the chance to represent Ukraine internationally in several prestigious tournaments (continental club tournaments). At the end of the season, the bottom clubs (usually two) are relegated to the First League, part of the lower Professional Football League, and are replaced by the top clubs from that league. All the participants of the Premier League enter the National Cup competition and enter it at the round of 32 (1/16th of the final) or Round of 16 stage.

The winner of the league at the beginning of every next season plays against the winner of the National Cup for the Ukrainian Super Cup, under administration of the Premier Liha. Besides the Super Cup game and the Premier Liha itself, the league conducts competitions among junior teams, including under 21s and under 19s. The champion of the under 19 championship qualifies for the UEFA Youth League.

=== Emblem ===
Old emblem

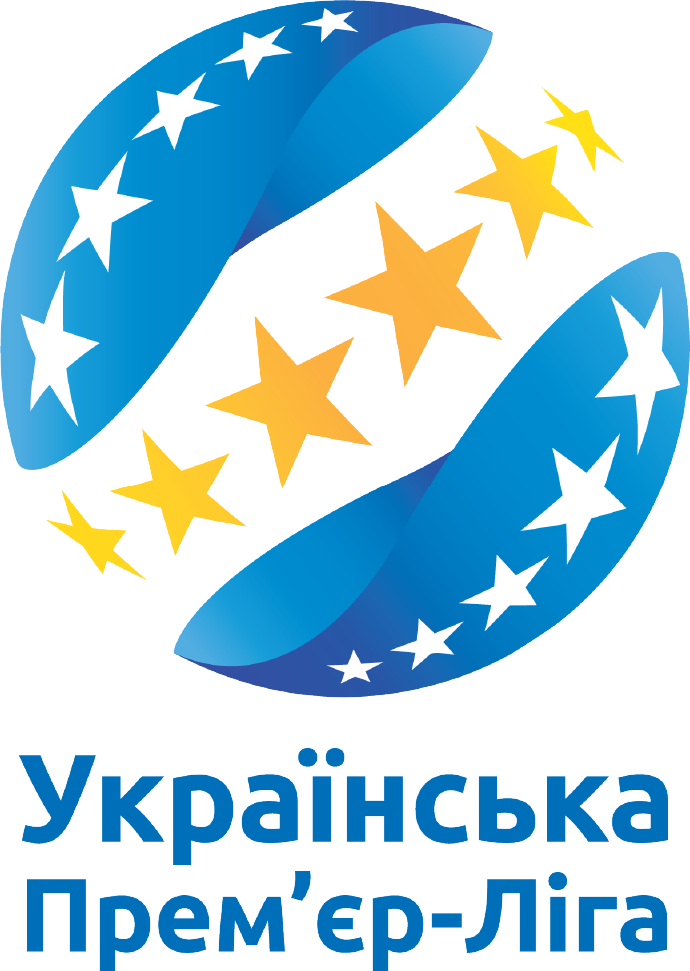
New emblem

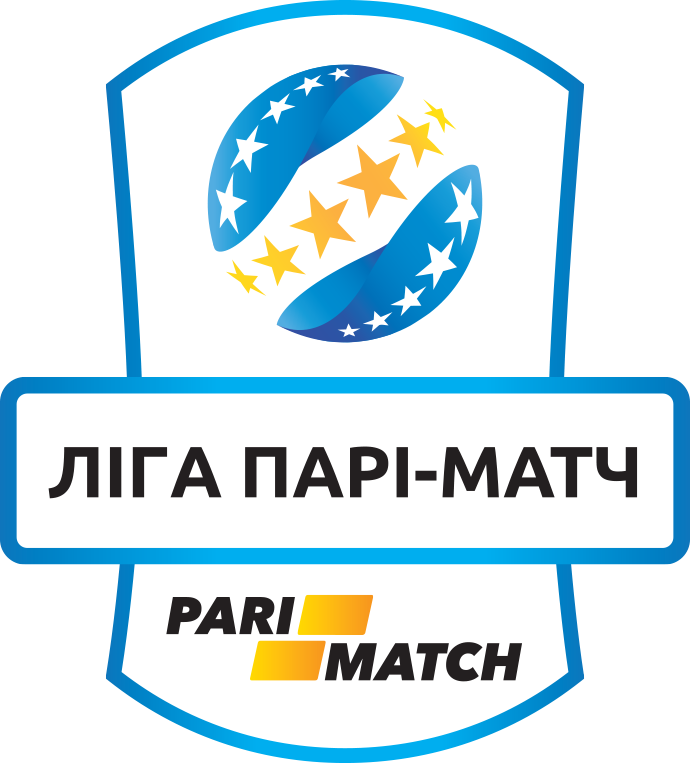
Season's emblem in 2016 with Parimatch as sponsor

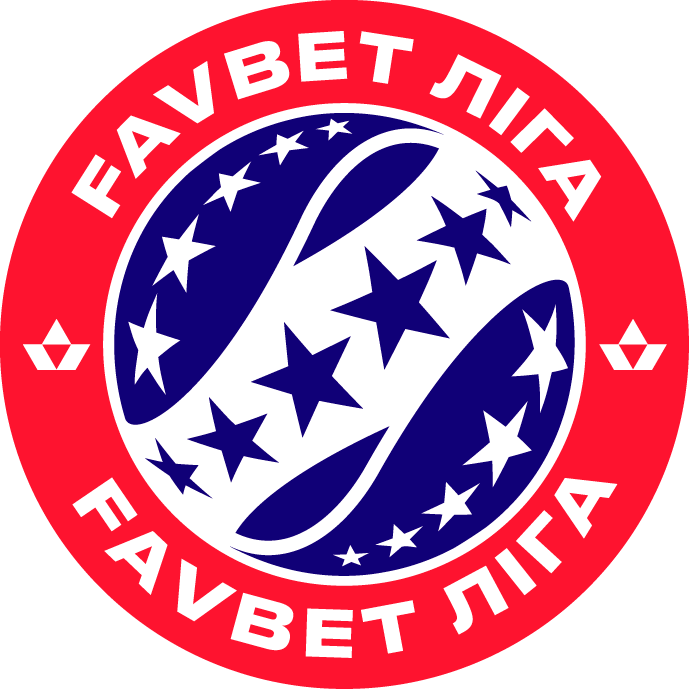
Season's emblem of FavBet as sponsor

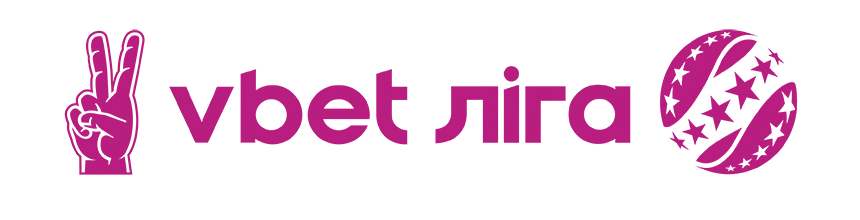
Season's emblem of VBet as sponsor

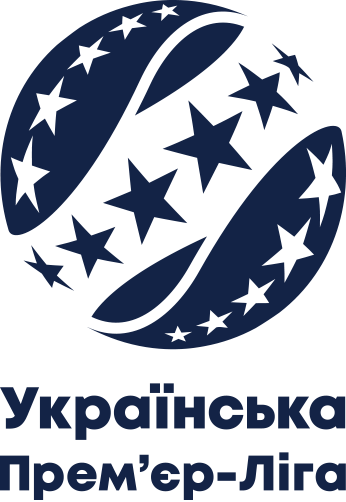
Season's emblem of Betking as sponsor

The first UPL emblem was created along with the establishment of the league in 2008 and replaced the Professional Football League of Ukraine emblem.

The original emblem depicts a football wrapped by a blue-yellow stripe, the national colors of Ukraine, on a blue background. Across the top and around the ball, 16 stars represent the league's participants. In 2014, when the league was reduced to 14 teams, the emblem was not changed. On the bottom, the script says "Premier League – Union of Professional Football Clubs of Ukraine".

As with the old emblem, the new emblem contains 16 stars. For the 2016–17 season, the sponsor's name was added.

=== Title sponsors ===
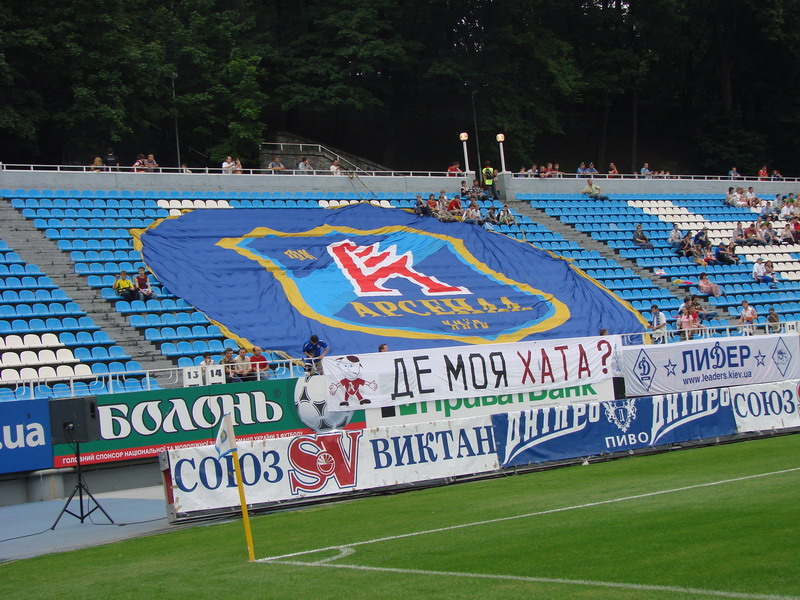
A banner with Soyuz(S•V)Viktan in 2007 at Valeriy Lobanovskyi Dynamo Stadium

Since at least 2006, the league has placed its sponsors' names in its seasons' titles. During that period, the league's sponsors were selected through the efforts of the Ukrainian sports marketing company "Media Sport Promotion" that was headed by Serhiy Kharchenko. Following the separation of the Ukrainian Premier League from the Professional Football League of Ukraine, the cooperation was disrupted. The first known sponsor of the Vyshcha Liha (Professional Football League top tier) was Russian-Ukrainian alcoholic beverage company "Soyuz-Viktan", in the 2006–07 Ukrainian championship. While the contract was signed for five years and officially presented by the presidents of the Football Federation of Ukraine and the Professional Football League of Ukraine as a title sponsor, Soyuz-Viktan was expected to stay for couple of seasons. But in 2007 a new title sponsor, "Biola" from Dnipro was announced.

Previously "Soyuz-Viktan" was sponsoring the Russian ice hockey team and its Hockey Super League. In 2006 it also became the sponsor of the newly established Channel One Cup. Back in 2002, Mirror Weekly published an article that leaders of "Soyuz-Viktan" were convicted in the Autonomous Republic of Crimea to 15 years imprisonment. The reputation of "Soyuz-Viktan" was questioned on several occasions.

Soon after the establishment of the Premier-Liha, in 2008 a contract was signed with a new sponsor, Epicentr K, a network of home improvement stores. The sum of the contract was announced as $3.6 million, while just three months before there were speculations that the new sponsor would pay no less than $5 million. In 2013 the contract expired.

A new contract was established in 2015 with a bookmaking company Pari-Match, which lasted for a couple of seasons.

- 2006–07: Soyuz-Viktan.
- 2007–08: Biola.
- 2008–09 – 2011–12: Epicentr K.
- 2015–16 – 2016–17: Pari-Match.
- 2019–20 – 2020–21 FavBet.
- 2021–22 – VBet.

=== Season's format and regulations ===
Season regulations are one of the two most important documents (other being the competition calendar) that are adopted by the Premier League prior to each season.

The Premier League directly organizes and conducts competitions among member clubs. Competitions are conducted on the principle of "Fair play" and according to the competition calendar which is approved by the Premier League General Assembly and the FFU Executive Committee 30 days before start of competitions. Until 2019 all advertisement, commercial rights and rights on TV and radio broadcasting of games of championship and cup belong to the club that hosts them (the Super Cup of Ukraine and the "Gold game"). All advertisement, commercial rights and rights on TV and radio broadcasting of the game of Super Cup and the "Gold game". Before 2014 Premier League was also administering some rounds of the Ukrainian Cup (round of 8, quarterfinals, and semifinals). The earlier rounds were administered by the Professional League and the final by the Federation. Since 2014 the organization of Ukrainian Cup competitions in full belongs exclusively to the Federation.

There are currently 12 club members of the league. All participants get approved by the Premier League General Assembly. Each club fields each team for senior competitions, and competitions for under 21 and under 19 teams (three teams). A club is required to have a stadium (registered with FFU) and an education and training facility (or center). A club is also obligated to finance its own youth sports institution and a complex scientific-methodical group as well as to own and finance a number of youth teams. A Premier League club needs to ensure the participation of at least four youth teams (ages groups between 14 and 17) in the Youth Football League of Ukraine. A club cannot field more than one team for a certain competition.

All club's staff members (coaches, physicians, massage specialists) have to be contracted and be UEFA licensed. All coaches should have A-diploma, while head coaches – PRO-diploma. Football players are listed in "A" and "B" rosters. "A" roster contains no more than 25 players, while "B" roster has unlimited number of players no older than 21 who have professional contracts or agreements for sports training. The 25-players "A" roster includes the number of slots allotted for players developed by the club.

During breaks in competitions in summer and winter there are two periods for registering players.

Beside the main championship among senior teams, the Premier League also organizes youth championship which was adopted from the previous Vyshcha Liha championship of doubles (reserves). Since 2012 there was added another competition for junior teams, so the original youth championship was renamed into the Championship of U-21 teams and the new competition was named as the Championship of U-19 teams. Unlike the Championship of U-21 teams, in the Championship of U-19 teams beside all of the Premier League clubs' junior teams, there also compete teams of some lower leagues' clubs.

The league's championship among senior teams is conducted by manner of the round robin system in two cycles "fall-spring" with one game at home and another at opponent's field with each participant. A competition calendar is formed after a draw that is conducted based on the Premier League club rankings. The calendar of the second cycle repeats the first, while hosting teams are switched. There should be no less than two calendar days between official games of a club. All games take place between 12:00 and 22:00 local time. Any game postponement is allowed only in emergencies and on decision of the Premier League Administration (Dyrektsiya). Game forfeitures are controlled by technical win/loss nominations and fines, followed by additional sanctions of the FFU Control-Disciplinary Committee, and possible elimination from the league.

=== Competition calendar ===
Clubs play each other twice (once at home and once away) in the 26-match season. The league begins in mid-July and ends in mid-June. After 13 rounds of fixtures, there is a winter break that lasts for three months (from early December to early March). Thus, the winter break is significantly longer than the interval between seasons. This schedule accounts for climatic conditions and matches that of most European leagues in terms of the beginning and the end of the season.

The first season of the League in 1992 was an exception, as it lasted only half a year. This was because the last Soviet league season ended in the autumn of 1991, and the Football Federation of Ukraine decided to shift the calendar from "spring-fall" to "fall-spring" football seasons. In the inaugural season, 20 clubs were divided into two 10-team groups. In both groups, each club played each other twice, and the championship was decided by a play-off match between the group winners, in which Tavriya Simferopol surprised the pre-season favorite Dynamo Kyiv.

After the first season, in each of the following seasons each team played each other team in the League twice. The number of participating teams fluctuated between 14 and 18, stabilizing since 2002–03 season at 16.

As of the 2005–06 season, the golden match rule was introduced. According to the rule, if the first two teams obtain the same number of points, the championship is to be decided by an additional "golden" match between the two teams. In fact, in that season Dynamo Kyiv and Shakhtar Donetsk had earned the same number of points and Shakhtar won the championship by winning the golden match (2–1 after extra time).

== History ==
=== Creation ===
Before 1992, Ukrainian teams played in the Soviet league system, and Dynamo Kyiv enjoyed great success, with the team being the team with the most Soviet league titles at 13. The only other Ukrainian teams that won the Soviet league were Dnipro and Zorya Luhansk. Shakhtar Donetsk was never able to win the Soviet Top League.

With the Soviet Union falling apart in late 1991, discussion arose about the creation of a separate Ukrainian league which would only include the top Ukrainian clubs. Following the failed 1991 coup d'état attempt against Mikhail Gorbachev, the Ukrainian parliament declared independence and set a date for an independence referendum to confirm the decision, which was ratified by the Ukrainian people.

Despite the failed putsch and declaration of independence by number of Soviet union republics, the Football Federation of the Soviet Union continued planning the 1992 football season. In September 1991, the Soviet magazine "Futbol" published some comments from head coaches of Ukrainian clubs playing in the Soviet First League, with those being Tavriya and Bukovyna. Tavriya head coach Anatoliy Zayaev said that the club was strongly against participation in Ukrainian championship and intended to continue to play in Soviet championship. The Bukovyna head coach Yukhym Shkolnykov said that the club did not have any wishes to return to the Ukrainian group as planned by the republican federation and no one should let politics transverse football. On May 1, 2024, Ukrainian journalist Ihor Tsyhanyk released a video-interview where he claimed that one of motivations to conduct the championship in the spring of 1992 was a financial situation of FC Dynamo Kyiv. He pointed to the fact that Dynamo won the 1990 Soviet Top League and qualified for the 1991–92 European Cup where it received prize money by participating in the last season of the European Cup before the competition rebranded as the UEFA Champions League. Tsyhanyk also mentioned that Dynamo was losing money due to poor business management of player transfers, but did not mention that in the Soviet period, when transferred of players was finally allowed, it was carried through a special department of the Football Federation of the Soviet Union, and Soviet clubs would receive only a portion of the transfer money. According to Tsyhanyk the administration of Dynamo along with the Football Federation of Ukraine, members of which were former players of the club saw an opportunity to gain financial support by fielding Ukrainian club which had a high ranking in the UEFA Champions League.

In October 1991 some Moscow press took a big interview from FC Dnipro head coach Yevhen Kucherevsky titled "How to live on?" His direct speech had started with a phrase "Dnipro is definitely for the Soviet championship". Next Yevhen Mefodiyich told about possible isolation of Ukrainian football, because if Ukraine would not be recognized by the world, there would be no membership in FIFA or UEFA. After that recalling some kind of World Basket League, Kucherevsky discussed the topic that "people are uniting, but we..." When questioned "what is the mood among coaches of other Ukrainian teams", he firmly answered: "Almost all are for the united championship and against separate Ukrainian".

In particular, Kucherevsky mentioned his talks with head coach of Shakhtar Valeriy Yaremchenko. According to Kucherevsky, the majority of Dnipro's fans, judging by their letters and telephone calls also consider that conducting of Ukrainian championship was not in time. Ended his interview Kucherevsky with a phrase that "he wants to hope that the situation when they have to play in a separate championship will never come". The coach even allowed the thought that Ukraine could be recognized as an independent state, but proposes an idea of the "Soviet open championship", referring to... the case with NHL.

In general, Kucherevsky was speaking of true situation. Among all Ukrainian teams of the Soviet Top League, only Dynamo was clearly and firmly for its own independent championship. Other clubs took position from "strongly against" to "possibly for, but". For example, Metalurh Zaporizhzhia that was playing its first season at such level was for the Soviet championship. Yet, Metalist that was struggling to stay in, took a tricky position: "If we are would relegate to the First Union League, we will be for Ukrainian championship, if we would stay at the top, we will be for Soviet championship".

In September 1991 there took place a session of the Football Federation of the Ukrainian SSR Executive Committee (ispolkom), which started with raising of blue-and-yellow flag that was given by a member of parliament Vyacheslav Chornovil. On proposition of Viktor Bannikov who at time was heading the football federation, the struggle for independent championship had to take place under national colors. The executive committee decided that blue-and-yellow flags had to flown over all stadiums where were playing Ukrainian teams. Some members of the executive committee have spoken about the independent Ukrainian championship, but did not rush with a decision. For that it was decided to wait until the Federation's plenum on 13–14 December 1991.

=== Vyshcha Liha and Professional Football League (1992–1999) ===
After the fall of the Soviet Union, the inaugural independent championship took place hastily at the start of spring 1992 after the creation of the Ukrainian Higher League (Ukrainian: Вища Ліга, Vyshcha Liha). The League was created out of the six teams that took part in the Soviet Top League, two teams from the Soviet First League, and nine out of the eleven Ukrainian teams from the Soviet Second League. The other two of that eleven were placed in the Ukrainian First League as they were to be relegated anyway. The two best teams of the Soviet Second League B of the Ukrainian Zone were also placed in the Higher League along with the winner of the 1991 Ukrainian Cup which finished ninth in the same group (Soviet Second League B).

The 20 participants were split into two groups with the winners playing for the championship title and the runners-up playing for third place. Three teams from each group were to be relegated. As expected, the five favorites, Dynamo Kyiv, Dnipro Dnipropetrovsk, Shakhtar Donetsk, Chornomorets Odesa, and Metalist Kharkiv finished at the top of each group. In the championship play-off game in Lviv, a sensation took place as Tavriya Simferopol beat Dynamo Kyiv 1–0. The Crimeans earned the first Ukrainian title, the only one in their history, with Tavriya only losing once, to Temp Shepetivka. To this date, this is the only title that was not won either by Dynamo or Shakhtar. Tavriya went extinct in 2014.

After being stunned in the first championship by Tavriya Simferopol in Lviv, Dynamo Kyiv were anxious to earn their first title at the second opportunity. In the second Ukrainian championship, which had a regular League format of 16 teams, their main rivals were Dnipro Dnipropetrovsk, who were top after the first half of the season. By the end of the season both teams were neck and neck and they finished with the same number of points, and Dynamo Kyiv won the title on goal difference.

The next eight years were known as the total domination of Dynamo Kyiv. During this period 'the main Soviet protagonists' had changed as some of the best teams were facing a crisis. After the 1993–94 season Metalist Kharkiv were surprisingly relegated to the First League. In the 1995–96 season Shakhtar Donetsk had the worst year in the club's history, coming tenth. Chornomorets Odesa were relegated twice during that first decade after which manager Leonid Buryak was sacked. A few newly created teams have since emerged such as Arsenal Kyiv and Metalurh Donetsk, as well as Vorskla Poltava, who surprisingly came third in the club's first season at the Top Level in the 1997.

=== Dynamo–Shakhtar rivalry and Premier League (2000–2010) ===
The next decade was marked by fierce competition between Dynamo Kyiv and Shakhtar Donetsk. Since 2000, Shakhtar Donetsk has proved to be the real challengers to Dynamo. In 2000, Shakhtar earned their first qualification to the Champions League earning a place in the group stage. Nonetheless, Dynamo Kyiv is still considered to be the benchmark of excellence in the country and the primary feeder to the Ukraine national football team. 2002 became the real cornerstone in the miners history when they earned their first national title under the management of the newly appointed Italian specialist, Nevio Scala, who managed to secure the Ukrainian Cup title as well. Since that time the issue of foreign players has become particularly acute and brought a series of court cases. The FFU and PFL worked together to solve that issue, coming up with a plan to force the transitional limitation of foreign players over time.

The clubs such as Dnipro Dnipropetrovsk and Chornomorets Odesa, who were recent contenders for the title, had to put up a fierce fight against the newly established contenders Metalurh Donetsk and Metalist Kharkiv to qualify for the European competitions. Metalist Kharkiv shone brightly in the late 2000s (decade) by consistently finishing right behind Dynamo Kyiv and Shakhtar Donetsk in third place. Their most remarkable feat was their participation in the 2009 European season when they had to face Dynamo Kyiv to earn a place in the quarter-finals of the 2008–09 UEFA Cup, but lost on the away goals rule. That same 2008–09 UEFA Cup competition was won for the first time by Shakhtar Donetsk, the first club of independent Ukraine to win the title. It was also the last UEFA cup title before it changed its name to the Europa league. In the 2008–09 season the league earned the highest UEFA league coefficient in Europe for that season.

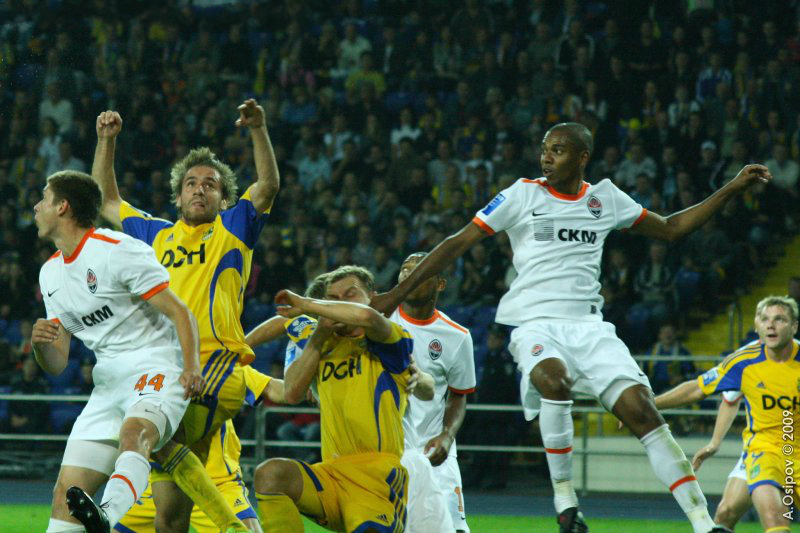
Aerial duel between players of Shakhtar and Metalist in September 2009 including Fernandinho and Marko Devic

On 15 November 2007 clubs' presidents of the Vyshcha Liha adopted a decision to create the Premier League (Premier Liha). At the same meeting session there was created a supervisory board that consisted of Ravil Safiullin (Professional Football League), Vitaliy Danilov (FC Kharkiv), Petro Dyminskyi (FC Karpaty), and Vadym Rabinovych (FC Arsenal). During the next three months that body curated a process on creation of the Premier League's regulation and statute as well as a procedure of launching the championship starting from the 2008–09 season. On 15 April 2008 at one of the meetings among the presidents of clubs there was signed a protocol about establishing the Association of Professional Football Clubs of Ukraine "Premier-Liha" as an autonomous entity, parting away from the PFL.

The Premier League has been split since the moment it was created in regards to its president. The dispute went as far as even canceling the 13th round of 2009–10 season and moving it to the spring half, while having the 14th round still playing in the fall. The representatives of five clubs: Arsenal Kyiv, Dynamo Kyiv, Dnipro Dnipropetrovsk, Kryvbas Kryvyi Rih, and Metalist Kharkiv have been boycotting most of the League meetings, not complying with its financial obligations and giving the broadcasting rights to TV-channels other than the League official supplier. They justified their actions due to what they deem to be the illegal election of the Premier League president. The representatives of the above-mentioned clubs did not recognize the election in 2008 of Vitaliy Danilov as the president and believed that the elections should have been won by Vadim Rabinovich.

To resolve this conflict Vitaliy Danilov instigated the re-election of the Premier League president in September 2009, and on 1 December 2009 won the election again with 11 clubs voting for his candidature, 3 were against, 1 abstained, and 1 was absent. This time most club presidents of the Premier League of Ukraine acknowledged Vitaliy Danilov legality. In the subsequent elections on 9 December 2011 Vitaliy Danilov was challenged by Andriy Kurhanskyi (through the proposal of Karpaty Lviv). The other available candidates, Miletiy Balchos (president of the Professional Football League of Ukraine) and Yuriy Kindzerskyi, were not picked by any members of the Premier League. Vitaliy Danilov managed to retain his seat with nine votes for him.

=== Big Four and two-round league (2011–2014) ===
Results of the 'Big Four' during the late 2000s–early 2010s
Season	DNI	DYN	MET	SHA
2005–06	6	2	5	1
2006–07	4	1	3	2
2007–08	4	2	3	1
2008–09	6	1	3	2
2009–10	4	2	3	1
2010–11	4	2	3	1
2011–12	4	2	3	1
2012–13	4	3	2	1
2013–14	2	4	3	1
2014–15	3	1	6	2
Top four	8	10	8	10
Finishes out of 10
League champions Champions League; UEFA Cup / Europa League group stage UEFA Cup / Europa League qualification UEFA Intertoto Cup

Starting from 2010 and to 2014 season, FC Shakhtar led by Romanian coach Mircea Lucescu obtained five national league titles in a row, making Lucescu the most successful manager in the history of the league with 9 titles. At the same time, in the beginning of the 2010s the so-called "Big Four" of clubs eventually formed, consisting from Shakhtar, Dynamo, Metalist and Dnipro. These four clubs consecutively took all the top 4 places for five seasons from 2009–10 to 2013–14 and displayed the biggest financial abilities in the league.

In 2012–13, Metalist Kharkiv finished second and qualified for the UEFA Champions League for the first time, the achievement which was repeated by Dnipro in the next season. In the same 2013–14 season Dynamo Kyiv for the first time since Ukrainian independence placed as low as fourth in league's season ranking, which led to dismissal of former national team coach and the legend of Soviet football Oleh Blokhin as the club's manager. In European football, new club achievements were set in these years for Shakhtar in 2010–11 UEFA Champions League quarter-finals and for Metalist in 2011–12 UEFA Europa League quarter-finals.

=== The league during the war in Donbas (2014-2022) ===
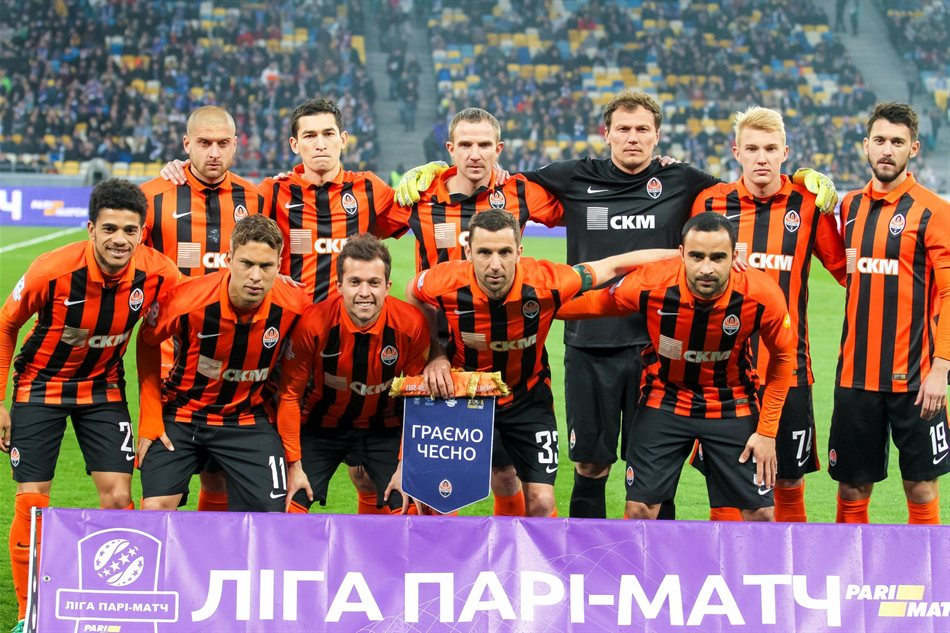
The 2017 Liha Pari-Match champions FC Shakhtar Donetsk with a pennant (Hrayemo Chesno, We Play Fair)

After the start of the war in Donbas in 2014, the number of teams participating in the league was cut from 16 in the 2013–14 season to 14 in the following two seasons. Teams from the Donbas would be forced to play outside the region as a consequence. Both of the seasons were won by Dynamo Kyiv with Serhii Rebrov as manager. With the continuation of the military conflict in the eastern oblasts of Ukraine since 2014 and its economic impact, the league was forced to change its format again and started to be contested by 12 teams after being cut from 14 after the 2015–16 season, introducing the two stages of the competition: after the standard two rounds of games the league would split into two 6-team groups according to their positions.

Under the new format, Shakhtar Donetsk under the manager Paulo Fonseca managed to win three league titles in a row from 2016–17 to 2018–19, runner-up in all the three seasons being Dynamo Kyiv. In 2019–20 season, Shakhtar set the record of the earliest title win in the history, with 5 rounds remaining. In 2019, the decision was adopted to expand the league to 14 teams from the 2020–21 and to 16 teams from the 2021–22 season.

=== After the Russian invasion of Ukraine (2022-present) ===
On 24 February 2022, Russia invaded Ukraine, and the result of this for Ukrainian football was the suspension of football competitions in the country, and on 26 April 2022, it was announced that the 2021-22 season would be abandoned due to the extension of martial law in Ukraine. The football clubs of the UPL also expressed their support for the termination, since it would not possible to end the championship due to the state of war in the country. Thus, it was concluded that the standings as of 24 February 2022 would be the final standings of the 2021–22 season, and there would be no champion for the season.

In the 2022-23 season, the competition restarted, with matches being played behind closed doors and sometimes interrupted by alert sirens. That season ended with Shakhtar Donetsk winning the tournament, which they also won in the following season. Dynamo Kyiv won the league in the 2024-25 season.

== Officials ==
=== Presidents ===
- Vitaliy Danilov, 27 May 2008 – 29 February 2016 (until 1 July 2009 – temporary acting, as president of FC Kharkiv, reelected on 1 July 2009 and 9 December 2011)
- Volodymyr Heninson, 29 February 2016 – 6 April 2018
- Thomas Grimm, 6 April 2018 – 5 April 2020
  - (executive director, acting) Yevhen Dykyi
- Yevhen Dykyi, 23 May 2023 – present

=== Directors ===
As of 20 April 2025

- Sport director: Maksym Stepanenko, head of the Board of Directors
- Commercial director: Maksym Radchenko, director of the UPL TV
- Department of Security and Infrastructure: Serhiy Bukhalenkov
- Department of international relations and development: Roman Kryvoruchko
- Informational and Analytical department: Valeriy Strokach

=== Former officials ===
- General director: Oleksandr Yefremov

== Competitions ==
- National championship (vbet Liha)
- Championship among under-21 (discontinued after 2020–21 season)
- Championship among under-19
- Super Cup (paused since 2021)

== Clubs ==
A total of 51 clubs have played in the Premier League up to 2026–27 season.

The following clubs competed in the 2026–27 season. Note in parentheses shows the actual home cities and stadiums.

Club	Home city	Stadium	Capacity	Position in 2025–26	First season in PL	Seasons in PL
Bukovyna Chernivtsi	Chernivtsi	Stadion Ukraina, Lviv	28,051	FL: 1st	1992	3
Chornomorets Odesa	Odesa	Stadion Chornomorets	34,164	FL: 2nd	1992	28
Dynamo Kyiv^{a}	Kyiv	Stadion Dynamo imeni Lobanovskoho	16,873	4th	1992	34
Epitsentr Kamianets-Podilskyi	Kamianets-Podilskyi (Ternopil temporarily)	Miskyi stadion imeni Shukhevycha	15,150	10th	2025–26	1
Karpaty Lviv	Lviv	Stadion Ukraina	28,052	9th	2006–07	29
FC Kharkiv	Kharkiv (Zhytomyr temporarily)	Tsentralnyi Stadion	5,928	5th	2021–22	4
Kolos Kovalivka	Kovalivka	Stadion Kolos	5,000	6th	2019–20	6
Kryvbas Kryvyi Rih	Kryvyi Rih	Stadion Hirnyk	2,500	7th	1992–93	23
FC Kudrivka	Kudrivka (Kyiv temporarily)	Obolon Arena	5,100	13th	2025–26	1
Livyi Bereh Kyiv	Kyiv	Arena Livyi Bereh	4,700	FL: 3rd	2024–25	1
LNZ Cherkasy	Cherkasy	Cherkasy Arena	10,321	2nd	2023–24	3
Obolon Kyiv	Kyiv	Obolon Arena	5,100	12th	2023–24	2
Polissia Zhytomyr	Zhytomyr	Tsentralnyi Stadion	5,928	3rd	2023–24	3
Shakhtar Donetsk^{a}	Donetsk (Lviv temporarily)	Arena Lviv	34,915	1st	1992	34
Veres Rivne	Rivne	Stadion Avanhard	4,650	11th	1992–93	8
Zorya Luhansk	Luhansk (Kyiv temporarily)	Arena Livyi Bereh	4,700	8th	1992	25

^{a}: Team played in every Ukrainian topflight season

=== Maps ===
Home venues of teams in the 2026–27 Ukrainian Premier League.
Several teams (FC Kharkiv, Shakhtar and Zorya) are playing their home games away from their cities due to ongoing hostilities.

== Broadcasting ==
From the spring part of the 2023–24 season, the Ukrainian Premier League launched a new sports channel — UPL.TV, which will be distributed by 1+1 Media distribution. The broadcast of the TV channel includes pre-match and post-match studios, reviews, interviews with football players, coaches and leaders of Ukrainian football.

=== International broadcasters ===
The main international broadcaster of the league in Western Europe and some countries of Africa is the French Ma Chaîne Sport providing coverage for such countries like France, and many other countries like Andorra, Switzerland, Belgium, Luxembourg, Monaco, Algeria, Morocco, Tunisia. Another broadcaster Sport Klub provides coverage in all countries of former Yugoslavia including Bosnia and Herzegovina, Croatia, North Macedonia, Serbia, and Slovenia. Other broadcasters of the Ukrainian league in other countries include 12 TV (Armenia), CBC Sport (Azerbaijan), Polsat Futbol (Poland), and Dolce Sport (Romania).

== UEFA ranking and European competitions ==
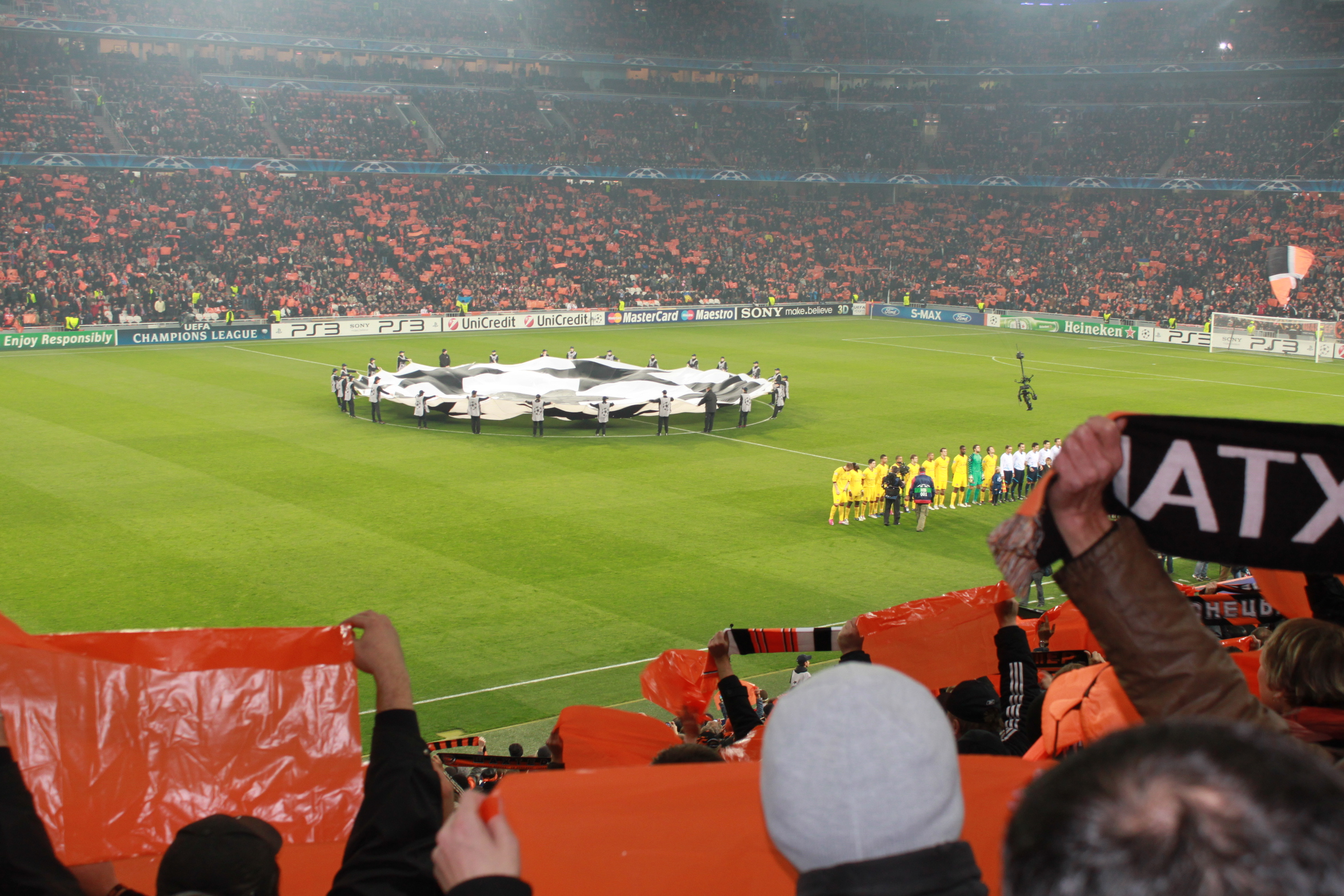
Shakhtar Donetsk against Arsenal in the 2010–11 UEFA Champions League

Ukrainian clubs have been competing in European competitions since the 1960s, when the country was part of the Soviet Union. In fact the first Soviet club that took part in European competitions was Ukrainian club, Dynamo Kyiv, which took part in the 1965–66 European Cup Winners' Cup. Before the fall of the Soviet Union, the following Ukrainian clubs participated in European competitions: Dynamo Kyiv, Karpaty Lviv, Zorya Luhansk, Chornomorets Odesa, Shakhtar Donetsk, FC Dnipro, and Metalist Kharkiv.

At least five clubs participated in top continental competitions the European Cup and the UEFA Champions League among which are Dynamo Kyiv, Dnipro, Metalist Kharkiv, Shakhtar Donetsk, and Tavriya Simferopol.

Both Dynamo and Shakhtar were able to win European trophies. Dynamo won two European Cup Winners' Cups (1975 and 1986) and one UEFA Super Cup in 1975, Shakhtar Donetsk won the UEFA Cup in 2008. Dnipro also reached the 2015 UEFA Europa League Final, but lost to Sevilla.

=== Ukrainian Premier League and European Super League ===
In 2023 talks about creation of the European Super League resurfaced with a decision of the European Court of Justice on 21 December 2023.

Number of Ukrainian football clubs came out with official statements on that matter.

- FC Shakhtar Donetsk spoke against the European Super League (22 December). They declared full support of the European Club Association decision and close partnership of European Club Association with UEFA.
- FC Karpaty Lviv spoke against the European Super League (21 December).

== International relations ==
In 2009, the Ukrainian Premier League joined the European Professional Football Leagues. Also in 2009 the league signed a partnership with IMG of which during the first month of cooperation sold broadcasting rights for the Ukrainian Cup to Poland and Armenia. On its own initiative, the Ukrainian Premier League sold broadcasting rights to Romania and Russia as well.

== Results by season ==
=== Higher League (Vyshcha Liha) ===
- Professional Football League of Ukraine was the governing body of the Top League (Vyshcha Liha) from 1996 to 2008.

Season	Champion	Runner-up	Third place	Top goalscorer	Rank
1992	Tavriya Simferopol	Dynamo Kyiv	Dnipro Dnipropetrovsk	(Ukraine) Yuriy Hudymenko (Tavriya Simferopol, 12 goals)	N/A (Note: part of Soviet Union)
1992–93	**Dynamo Kyiv** ‡	Dnipro Dnipropetrovsk	Chornomorets Odesa	(Ukraine) Serhiy Husyev (Chornomorets Odesa, 17 goals)	28/39
1993–94	Dynamo Kyiv	Shakhtar Donetsk	Chornomorets Odesa ‡	(Ukraine) Tymerlan Huseinov (Chornomorets Odesa, 18 goals)	24/44
1994–95	Dynamo Kyiv	Chornomorets Odesa	Dnipro Dnipropetrovsk	(Tajikistan) Arsen Avakov (Torpedo Zaporizhzhia, 21 goals)	24/47
1995–96	**Dynamo Kyiv** ‡	Chornomorets Odesa	Dnipro Dnipropetrovsk	(Ukraine) Tymerlan Huseinov (Chornomorets Odesa, 20 goals)	19/48
1996–97	Dynamo Kyiv	Shakhtar Donetsk ‡	Vorskla Poltava	(Ukraine) Oleh Matveyev (Shakhtar Donetsk, 21 goals)	22/48
1997–98	**Dynamo Kyiv** ‡	Shakhtar Donetsk	Karpaty Lviv	(Ukraine) Serhii Rebrov (Dynamo Kyiv, 22 goals)	17/49
1998–99	**Dynamo Kyiv** ‡	Shakhtar Donetsk	Kryvbas Kryvyi Rih	(Ukraine) Andriy Shevchenko (Dynamo Kyiv, 18 goals)	15/50
1999–00	**Dynamo Kyiv** ‡	Shakhtar Donetsk	Kryvbas Kryvyi Rih	(Uzbekistan) Maksim Shatskikh (Dynamo Kyiv, 20 goals)	12/50
2000–01	Dynamo Kyiv	Shakhtar Donetsk ‡	Dnipro Dnipropetrovsk	(Ukraine) Andriy Vorobey (Shakhtar Donetsk, 21 goals)	13/51
2001–02	**Shakhtar Donetsk** ‡	Dynamo Kyiv	Metalurh Donetsk	(Ukraine) Serhiy Shyshchenko (Metalurh Donetsk, 12 goals)	13/51
2002–03	**Dynamo Kyiv** ‡	Shakhtar Donetsk	Metalurh Donetsk	(Uzbekistan) Maksim Shatskikh (Dynamo Kyiv, 22 goals)	14/52
2003–04	Dynamo Kyiv	Shakhtar Donetsk ‡	Dnipro Dnipropetrovsk	(Georgia (country)) Giorgi Demetradze (Metalurh Donetsk, 18 goals)	14/52
2004–05	Shakhtar Donetsk	Dynamo Kyiv ‡	Metalurh Donetsk	(Ukraine) Oleksandr Kosyrin (Chornomorets Odesa, 14 goals)	15/52
2005–06	Shakhtar Donetsk	Dynamo Kyiv ‡	Chornomorets Odesa	(Brazil) Brandão (Shakhtar Donetsk, 15 goals) (Nigeria) Emmanuel Okoduwa (Arsenal Kyiv, 15 goals)	13/52
2006–07	**Dynamo Kyiv** ‡	Shakhtar Donetsk	Metalist Kharkiv	(Ukraine) Oleksandr Hladkyi (FC Kharkiv, 13 goals)	11/52
2007–08	**Shakhtar Donetsk** ‡	Dynamo Kyiv	Bronze stripped *	(Ukraine) (Serbia) Marko Dević* (Metalist Kharkiv, 19 goals)	12/53

=== Premier League ===
Season	Champion	Runner-up	Third place	Top goalscorer	Rank
2008–09	Dynamo Kyiv	Shakhtar Donetsk	Metalist Kharkiv	(Ukraine) Oleksandr Kovpak (Tavriya Simferopol, 17 goals)	7/53
2009–10	Shakhtar Donetsk	Dynamo Kyiv	Metalist Kharkiv	(Ukraine) Artem Milevskyi (Dynamo Kyiv, 17 goals)	7/53
2010–11	**Shakhtar Donetsk** ‡	Dynamo Kyiv	Metalist Kharkiv	(Ukraine) Yevhen Seleznyov (Dnipro Dnipropetrovsk, 17 goals)	8/53
2011–12	**Shakhtar Donetsk** ‡	Dynamo Kyiv	Metalist Kharkiv	(Ukraine) Yevhen Seleznyov (Shakhtar Donetsk, 14 goals) (Brazil) Maicon (Volyn Lutsk, 14 goals)	9/53
2012–13	**Shakhtar Donetsk** ‡	Metalist Kharkiv	Dynamo Kyiv	(Armenia) Henrikh Mkhitaryan (Shakhtar Donetsk, 25 goals)	7/53
2013–14	Shakhtar Donetsk	Dnipro Dnipropetrovsk	Metalist Kharkiv	(Brazil) Luiz Adriano (Shakhtar Donetsk, 20 goals)	9/53
2014–15	**Dynamo Kyiv** ‡	Shakhtar Donetsk	Dnipro Dnipropetrovsk	(Brazil) Alex Teixeira (Shakhtar Donetsk, 17 goals) (Romania) Eric Bicfalvi (Volyn Lutsk, 17 goals)	8/54
2015–16	Dynamo Kyiv	Shakhtar Donetsk ‡	Dnipro Dnipropetrovsk	(Brazil) Alex Teixeira (Shakhtar Donetsk, 22 goals)	8/54
2016–17	**Shakhtar Donetsk** ‡	Dynamo Kyiv	Zorya Luhansk	(Ukraine) Andriy Yarmolenko (Dynamo Kyiv, 15 goals)	8/55
2017–18	**Shakhtar Donetsk** ‡	Dynamo Kyiv	Vorskla Poltava	(Argentina) Facundo Ferreyra (Shakhtar Donetsk, 21 goal)	8/55
2018–19	**Shakhtar Donetsk** ‡	Dynamo Kyiv	Oleksandriya	(Ukraine) (Brazil) Júnior Moraes (Shakhtar Donetsk, 19 goals)	9/55
2019–20	Shakhtar Donetsk	Dynamo Kyiv ‡	Zorya Luhansk	(Ukraine) Júnior Moraes (Shakhtar Donetsk, 20 goals)	10/55
2020–21	**Dynamo Kyiv** ‡	Shakhtar Donetsk	Zorya Luhansk	(Ukraine) Vladyslav Kulach (Vorskla Poltava, 15 goals)	12/55
2021–22	Shakhtar Donetsk	Dynamo Kyiv	Zorya Luhansk	(Ukraine) Artem Dovbyk (SC Dnipro-1, 14 goals)	13/55
2022–23	Shakhtar Donetsk	SC Dnipro-1	Zorya Luhansk	(Ukraine) Artem Dovbyk (SC Dnipro-1, 24 goals)	14/55
2023–24	**Shakhtar Donetsk** ‡	Dynamo Kyiv	Kryvbas Kryvyi Rih	(Ukraine) Vladyslav Vanat (Dynamo Kyiv, 14 goals)	18/55
2024–25	Dynamo Kyiv	Oleksandriya	Shakhtar Donetsk ‡	(Ukraine) Vladyslav Vanat (Dynamo Kyiv, 17 goals)	23/55
2025–26	Shakhtar Donetsk	LNZ Cherkasy	Polissya Zhytomyr	(Ukraine) Matviy Ponomarenko (Dynamo Kyiv, 13 goals)	23/55

Notes:

- Rank column shows the position of Ukraine in the UEFA league coefficient.
- In **bold** are the league winners that also won the Ukrainian Cup (season double).
- ‡ – indicates a team that also won the Ukrainian Cup in the same season.
- The 2014–15 season was not completed due to the ongoing War in Donbas. One game was not played due to security concerns in Odesa.
- The 2021–22 season was not completed due to the Russian invasion of Ukraine. No team was crowned champions in that season.
- Metalist Kharkiv was stripped of their bronze award for 2007–08 season after the Court of Arbitration for Sport in Lausanne ruled against the game Karpaty – Metalist (19 April 2008).
- A native of Serbia, Marko Dević was granted Ukrainian citizenship after the 2007–08 season.
- A native of Brazil, Júnior Moraes was granted Ukrainian citizenship in March 2019.

== Performance by club ==
Club	Winners	Runners-up	Third place	Winning years
Dynamo Kyiv	17	13	1	1992–93, 1993–94, 1994–95, 1995–96, 1996–97, 1997–98, 1998–99, 1999–2000, 2000–01, 2002–03, 2003–04, 2006–07, 2008–09, 2014–15, 2015–16, 2020–21, 2024–25
Shakhtar Donetsk	16	13	1	2001–02, 2004–05, 2005–06, 2007–08, 2009–10, 2010–11, 2011–12, 2012–13, 2013–14, 2016–17, 2017–18, 2018–19, 2019–20, 2022–23, 2023–24, 2025–26
Tavriya Simferopol	1	–	–	1992
Dnipro	–	2	7	
Chornomorets Odesa	–	2	3	
Metalist Kharkiv	–	1	6	
Oleksandriya	–	1	1	
Dnipro-1	–	1	–	
LNZ Cherkasy	–	1	–	
Zorya Luhansk	–	–	4	
Metalurh Donetsk	–	–	3	
Kryvbas Kryvyi Rih	–	–	3	
Vorskla Poltava	–	–	2	
Karpaty Lviv	–	–	1	
Polissya Zhytomyr	–	–	1	
Total	34	34	33	

Titles won by club (%)
1. Dynamo Kyiv – 17 (50.0%)
2. Shakhtar Donetsk - 16 (47.1%)
3. Tavriya Simferopol – 1 (2.90%)

Notes:

- Defunct teams marked in Italics.
- Kryvbas includes achievements of both the original Kryvbas and the 2020 Kryvbas.

=== Honored teams ===
A representative star is placed above the team's badge to indicate 10 league titles. Dynamo Kyiv became the first Ukrainian team to achieve the prestigious honor of winning the Soviet Top League for the 10th time in 1981. Dynamo Kyiv after having entered the Ukrainian championship has become the same dominant leader as during the Soviet times by earning its 20th national title at the top level in 1999. The two stars were added to the club's logo in 2007. Earning its 10th national title in 2017, Shakhtar Donetsk has not yet adopted a star on its crest. After winning the 2024–25 season, Dynamo Kyiv added a star to the club's badge.

Currently (as of 2025) the following clubs earned the star element to be added to their crest.

- Dynamo Kyiv (13 in Soviet Union; 17 in Ukraine).
- Shakhtar Donetsk (16 in Ukraine)
- Dnipro (2 in Soviet Union)
- Zorya Luhansk (1 in Soviet Union)
- Tavriya Simferopol (1 in Ukraine)

=== Prestige trophy ===
From 2016–17 to 2019–20 seasons, the league conducted season competition in two rounds, where after the first double round robin tournament the league is split in half into two groups of six teams. Then, top six play second double round robin for the title, while the bottom six play to determine teams to be relegated (and Europa League playoff participants in the 2019–20 season). The team that won the relegation group receives a consolation-type honorary award, the Prestige trophy.

Season	Prestige trophy
2016–17	Vorskla Poltava
2017–18	FC Oleksandriya
2018–19	Vorskla Poltava
2019–20	SC Dnipro-1

== Premier League players ==
Ex-Dynamo Kyiv strikers Maksim Shatskikh and Serhiy Rebrov hold the record for most Ukrainian Premier League goals with 123, with Shatskikh winning the top single season scorer title twice in 1999–2000 and 2002–03, Rebrov once in 1997–98. Since the first Ukrainian Premier League season in 1992, 22 different players have won or shared the top scorer's title. Only five players have won the title more than once, Tymerlan Huseynov, Maksim Shatskikh, Yevhen Seleznyov, Alex Teixeira and Júnior Moraes.

Henrikh Mkhitaryan holds the record for most goals in a season (25), Serhiy Rebrov and Maksim Shatskikh are the only two players to score at least 20 goals twice. The most prolific all-time scorers are Ivan Hetsko and Viktor Leonenko, respectively attaining 0.59 and 0.57 goals per game.

All-time Premier League appearance leaders
**Player**	**Games**	**Years**
(Ukraine) Oleksandr Shovkovskyi	426	1994–2017
(Ukraine) Oleh Shelayev	412	1994–2014
(Ukraine) Vyacheslav Checher	410	1994–2017
(Ukraine) Oleksandr Chizhevskiy	400	1992–2006, 2008, 2010
(Ukraine) Oleksandr Horyainov	391	1994–2015
(Ukraine) Ruslan Rotan	375	2000–2018
(Ukraine) Serhiy Nazarenko	373	2000, 2002–2017
(Ukraine) **Taras Stepanenko**	370	2007–2025
(Ukraine) Serhiy Shyshchenko	363	1993–2010
(Ukraine) Ruslan Kostyshyn	359	1997–2012
Players **in bold** are still playing in Premier League; Data as of 14 December 2025

All-time Premier League scorers
**Player**	**Goals**	**Games**	**Years**
(Uzbekistan) Maksim Shatskikh	124 (Note: On 22 July 2017 Ukrainian Premier League announced that Maksim Shatskikh might have scored 123 goals instead of 124 due to one of the autogoals (own goals) being counted towards his tally. Other time, the same news outlet claims that Shatskikh indeed scored 124. Later again, UPL acknowledged that Shatskikh indeed scored 124.)	341	2000–2015
(Ukraine) Serhiy Rebrov	123	261	1992–2000, 2006–2008
(Ukraine) Yevhen Seleznyov	117	257	2007–2017, 2020–2023
(Ukraine) **Andriy Yarmolenko**	116	275	2008–2018, 2023–
(Ukraine) Andriy Vorobey	105	315	1998–2013
(Ukraine) Júnior Moraes (Note: naturalized Brazilian)	103	189	2013–2022
(Ukraine) Oleksandr Hladkyy	99	359	2005–2018, 2020–2023
(Ukraine) Oleksandr Haydash	95 (Note: Haidash who is recorded with 95 goals in reality did score 96, but the game in which he scored was cancelled along with his record.)	259 (Note: Some records indicate that Haidash played 258 games.)	1993–2004
(Ukraine) Marko Dević (Note: naturalized Serbian)	90	219	2005–2014
(Ukraine) Serhiy Mizin	90	342	1993–2008
Players **in bold** are still playing in Premier League; Data as of 14 December 2025

All-time Premier League goalkeepers
**Player**	**C/S Games**	**Total Games**	**Years**
(Ukraine) Oleksandr Shovkovskyi	233	426	1994–2017
(Ukraine) Andriy Pyatov	174	344	2003–2023
(Ukraine) Oleksandr Horyainov	151	391	1994–2015
(Ukraine) Vitaliy Reva	128	341	1996–2014
(Ukraine) Dmytro Shutkov	122	266	1992–2008
(Ukraine) Serhiy Dolhanskyi	96	328	1993–2013
(Ukraine) Ihor Shukhovtsev	94	349	1992–2013
(Ukraine) Mykola Medin	91	205	1993–2006
(Ukraine) Vyacheslav Kernozenko	86	195	1997–2010
(Ukraine) Yuriy Pankiv	86	268	2012–2023
Players **in bold** are still playing in Premier League; Data as of 4 January 2024

== Premier League managers ==
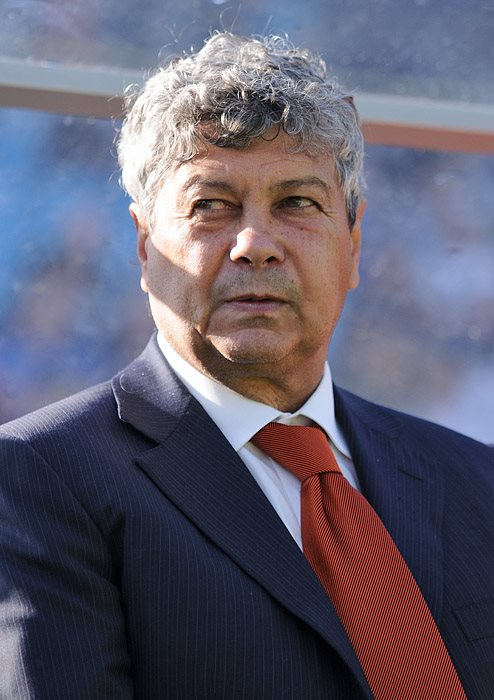
Former Shakhtar Donetsk and Dynamo Kyiv manager Mircea Lucescu is the most successful manager in Ukrainian Premier League history with 9 championships and the only who won it with multiple clubs.

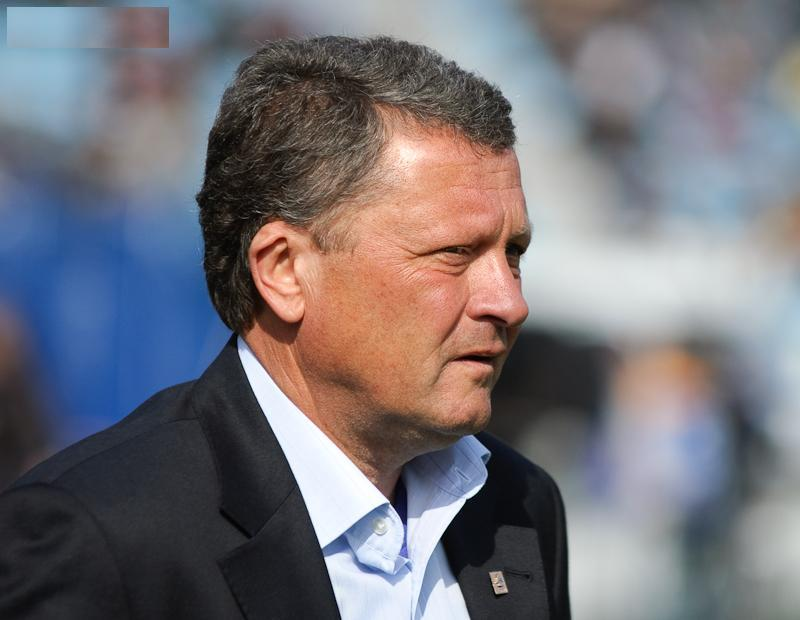
Myron Markevych has managed the most games in Ukrainian Premier League, participating in every season from the inaugurational 1992 to 2015–16 (with the exception of 2004–05).

The league's record holder for winnings is Mircea Lucescu.

Winning managers
Manager	Club(s)	Wins	Winning years
(Romania) Mircea Lucescu	Shakhtar Donetsk; Dynamo Kyiv	9	2004–05, 2005–06, 2007–08, 2009–10, 2010–11, 2011–12, 2012–13, 2013–14, 2020–21
(Ukraine) Valery Lobanovsky	Dynamo Kyiv	5	1996–97, 1997–98, 1998–99, 1999–2000, 2000–01
(Portugal) Paulo Fonseca	Shakhtar Donetsk	3	2016–17, 2017–18, 2018–19
(Ukraine) Yozhef Sabo	Dynamo Kyiv	2	1993–94, 1995–96
(Ukraine) Oleksiy Mykhailychenko	Dynamo Kyiv	2	2002–03, 2003–04
(Ukraine) Serhiy Rebrov	Dynamo Kyiv	2	2014–15, 2015–16
(Ukraine) Anatoliy Zayaev	Tavriya Simferopol	1	1992
(Ukraine) Mykhailo Fomenko	Dynamo Kyiv	1	1992–93
(Ukraine) Mykola Pavlov	Dynamo Kyiv	1	1994–95
(Italy) Nevio Scala	Shakhtar Donetsk	1	2001–02
(Ukraine) Anatoliy Demyanenko	Dynamo Kyiv	1	2005–06
(Russia) Yuri Semin	Dynamo Kyiv	1	2008–09
(Portugal) Luis Castro	Shakhtar Donetsk	1	2019–20
(Croatia) Igor Jovićević	Shakhtar Donetsk	1	2022–23
(Croatia) / (Netherlands) Marino Pušić	Shakhtar Donetsk	1	2023–24
(Ukraine) Oleksandr Shovkovskyi	Dynamo Kyiv	1	2024–25
(Turkey) Arda Turan	Shakhtar Donetsk	1	2025–26

- Notes:
  - Roberto De Zerbi was a manager of FC Shakhtar Donetsk during the war championship of 2021–22 which was not finished.

The league's record holder for games in the league is Myron Markevych.

All-time top-10 managers with league games
**Rank**	**Coach**	**Games**	**First**	**Last**
1	(Ukraine) Myron Markevych	622	7 March 1992	15 May 2016
2	(Ukraine) Mykola Pavlov	549	7 March 1992	30 May 2015
3	(Romania) Mircea Lucescu	432	22 May 2004	3 November 2023
4	(Ukraine) Vitaliy Kvartsyanyi	340	23 September 1994	31 May 2017
5	(Ukraine) Valeriy Yaremchenko	297	7 March 1992	2 October 2011
6	(Ukraine) Mykhailo Fomenko	293	13 March 1993	27 September 2008
7	(Ukraine) Oleh Taran	273	9 July 1997	1 November 2014
8	(Ukraine) **Yuriy Vernydub**	266	3 December 2011	
9	(Ukraine) Volodymyr Sharan	265	29 September 2007	10 November 2023
10	(Ukraine) Semen Altman	257	7 August 1999	10 May 2012
Coaches **in bold** are still active in the League; Data as of 8 January 2024

Current managers (2025–26 season)
Nat.	Name	Club	Appointed	Time as manager
(Ukraine)	Serhiy Nahornyak	Epitsentr Kamianets-Podilskyi	2 September 2022	4 years, 79 days
(Ukraine)	Oleh Shandruk	Veres Rivne	12 December 2023	2 years, 343 days
(Ukraine)	Vasyl Baranov	FC Kudrivka	4 September 2024	2 years, 77 days
(Ukraine)	Ruslan Kostyshyn	Kolos Kovalivka	10 March 2025	1 year, 255 days
(Turkey)	Arda Turan	Shakhtar Donetsk	27 May 2025	1 year, 177 days
(Ukraine)	Ruslan Rotan	Polissya Zhytomyr	29 May 2025	1 year, 175 days
(Ukraine)	Oleksandr Antonenko (caretaker)	Obolon Kyiv	4 June 2025	1 year, 169 days
(Ukraine)	Vitaliy Ponomaryov	LNZ Cherkasy	5 June 2025	1 year, 168 days
(Netherlands)	Patrick van Leeuwen	Kryvbas Kryvyi Rih	9 June 2025	1 year, 164 days
(Ukraine)	Ivan Fedyk	Rukh Lviv	11 June 2025	1 year, 162 days
(Ukraine)	Viktor Skrypnyk	Zorya Luhansk	16 June 2025	1 year, 157 days
(Croatia)	Mladen Bartulović	Metalist 1925 Kharkiv	20 June 2025	1 year, 153 days
(Ukraine)	Pavlo Matviychenko (caretaker)	SC Poltava	29 July 2025	1 year, 114 days
(Ukraine)	Ihor Kostyuk	Dynamo Kyiv	27 November 2025	358 days
(Spain)	Fran Fernández	Karpaty Lviv	8 January 2026	316 days
(Ukraine)	Volodymyr Sharan	FC Oleksandriya	23 March 2026	242 days

== All-time participants ==
The table lists the place each team took in each of the seasons.

=== Vyshcha Liha era (1992–2008) ===
Season	1992	92/93	93/94	94/95	95/96	96/97	97/98	98/99	99/00	00/01	01/02	02/03	03/04	04/05	05/06	06/07	07/08
Teams	20	16	18	18	18	16	16	16	16	14	14	16	16	16	16	16	16
CSKA Kyiv–Arsenal Kyiv (Note: Arsenal Kyiv was renamed from CSKA Kyiv in 2001, the original CSKA Kyiv was recreated in the First League in place of CSCA-2 Kyiv.)					4	11	10	7	10	6	12	5	9	9	12	14	6
Borysfen Boryspil													7	16			
Bukovyna Chernivtsi	10	12	17														
Chornomorets Odesa	5	3	3	2	2	7	15		15			8	5	6	3	6	7
Dnipro	3	2	4	3	3	4	4	12	11	3	6	4	3	4	6	4	4
Dynamo Kyiv	2	1	1	1	1	1	1	1	1	1	2	1	1	2	2	1	2
Hoverla Uzhhorod											14			12	16		16
Karpaty Lviv	13	6	5	8	8	5	3	4	9	10	8	7	15			8	10
Kharkiv															13	12	14
Kremin Kremenchuk	14	9	15	10	9	15											
Kryvbas Kryvyi Rih		8	6	6	14	12	8	3	3	11	9	12	10	13	14	10	13
Mariupol							14	5	8	4	10	10	8	5	4	15	
Metalist Kharkiv	6	5	18					6	5	9	5	16		11	5	3	(3)*
Metalurh Donetsk							6	14	7	5	3	3	4	3	9	9	12
Metalurh Zaporizhya	11	7	16	9	5	8	9	8	6	8	4	15	11	10	8	7	9
Mykolaiv	18			13	16			16									
Naftovyk-Ukrnafta Okhtyrka	16																15
Nyva Ternopil	7	14	7	12	13	9	7	13	12	14							
Nyva Vinnytsia	15		10	14	15	16											
Obolon Kyiv												14	6	15			
Odesa	20																
Oleksandriya											13	13					
Prykarpattya Ivano-Frankivsk	17			11	11	13	13	15	14								
Shakhtar Donetsk	4	4	2	4	10	2	2	2	2	2	1	2	2	1	1	2	1
Stal Alchevsk										13					11	16	
Tavriya Simferopol	1	10	8	5	12	6	12	9	13	7	7	9	12	7	7	5	5
Temp Shepetivka	19		9	17													
Torpedo Zaporizhzhia	8	13	13	7	7	14	16										
Veres Rivne		16	11	18													
Volyn Lutsk	9	11	12	15	17							6	13	8	15		
Vorskla Poltava						3	5	10	4	12	11	11	14	14	10	13	8
Zirka Kropyvnytskyi					6	10	11	11	16				16				
Zorya Luhansk	12	15	14	16	18											11	11

=== Premier League era (2008–present) ===
Season	08/09	09/10	10/11	11/12	12/13	13/14	14/15	15/16	16/17	17/18	18/19	19/20	20/21	21/22	22/23	23/24	24/25	25/26	26/27
Teams	16	16	16	16	16	16	14	14	12	12	12	12	14	16	16	16	16	16	16
Arsenal Kyiv	11	7	9	5	8	16					12								
Bukovyna Chernivtsi																			•
Chornomorets Odesa	10	15		9	6	5	11	11	6	11	11			13	9	12	16		•
Desna Chernihiv											8	4	6	7					
Dnipro	6	4	4	4	4	2	3	3	11										
Dnipro-1												7	7	3	2	4			
Dynamo Kyiv	1	2	2	2	3	4	1	1	2	2	2	2	1	2	4	2	1	4	•
Epitsentr Kamianets-Podilskyi																		10	•
Hoverla Uzhhorod		16			15	12	12	13											
Inhulets Petrove													12	14	14		15		
Karpaty Lviv (original)	9	5	5	14	14	11	13	7	10	8	10	12							
Karpaty Lviv (later)																	6	9	•
Kharkiv	16																		
Kolos Kovalivka												6	4	8	8	11	10	6	•
Kryvbas–Kryvbas (2020)	12	14	13	10	7										7	3	5	7	•
Kudrivka																		13	•
Livyi Bereh Kyiv																	14		•
LNZ Cherkasy																7	12	2	•
Lviv	15										6	11	8	12	16				
Mariupol	14	12	14	11	9	10	14			5	4	8	11	16					
Metalist Kharkiv	3	3	3	3	2	3	6	10							15				
Metalist 1925 Kharkiv														10	12	16		5	•
Metalurh Donetsk	4	8	8	7	5	6	10												
Metalurh Zaporizhya	7	9	16		16	14	7	14											
Mynai													14	15	10	15			
Obolon Kyiv (original)		11	10	15															
Obolon Kyiv (Brovar)																14	11	12	•
Oleksandriya				16				6	5	7	3	5	9	6	6	8	2	15	
Olimpik Donetsk						8	9	5	4	9	9	9	13						
Polissia Zhytomyr																5	4	3	•
Poltava																		16	
Rukh Lviv													10	11	11	6	8	14	
Sevastopol			15			9													
Shakhtar Donetsk	2	1	1	1	1	1	2	2	1	1	1	1	2	1	1	1	3	1	•
Stal Kamianske								8	8	12									
Tavriya Simferopol	8	6	7	6	11	15													
Veres Rivne										6				9	13	13	9	11	•
Volyn Lutsk			11	12	13	13	9	12	12										
Vorskla Poltava	5	10	6	8	12	8	5	5	7	3	7	10	5	5	5	9	13		
Zirka Kropyvnytskyi									9	10									
Zorya Luhansk	13	13	12	13	10	7	4	4	3	4	5	3	3	4	3	10	7	8	•

Teams marking (as of 2025–26):

Competing in UPL (1st tier)
Competing in PFL (2nd tier)
Competing in PFL (3rd tier)
Competing in AAFU (4th tier)
Competing in regional championships (below 4th tier)
Defunct clubs

=== Teams by region and city ===
Region	City(ies)	Team(s)
Autonomous Republic of Crimea	Sevastopol	Sevastopol
Autonomous Republic of Crimea	Simferopol	Tavriya
Cherkasy Oblast	Cherkasy	LNZ
Chernihiv Oblast	Chernihiv	Desna
Chernihiv Oblast	Kudrivka	Kudrivka
Chernivtsi Oblast	Chernivtsi	Bukovyna
Dnipropetrovsk Oblast	Dnipro	Dnipro and Dnipro-1
Dnipropetrovsk Oblast	Kryvyi Rih	Kryvbas
Dnipropetrovsk Oblast	Kamianske	Stal
Donetsk Oblast	Mariupol	Mariupol
Donetsk Oblast	Donetsk	Metalurh, Olimpik, and Shakhtar
Ivano-Frankivsk Oblast	Ivano-Frankivsk	Prykarpattia
Kharkiv Oblast	Kharkiv	Kharkiv, Metalist, and Metalist 1925
Khmelnytskyi Oblast	Kamianets-Podilskyi	Epitsentr
Khmelnytskyi Oblast	Shepetivka	Temp
Kirovohrad Oblast	Petrove	Inhulets
Kirovohrad Oblast	Oleksandriya	Oleksandriya
Kirovohrad Oblast	Kropyvnytskyi	Zirka
Kyiv	—	CSKA – Arsenal, Dynamo, Livyi Bereh, Obolon (original), and Obolon (Brovar)
Kyiv Oblast	Kovalivka	Kolos
Kyiv Oblast	Boryspil	Borysfen
Luhansk Oblast	Luhansk	Zorya
Luhansk Oblast	Alchevsk	Stal
Lviv Oblast	Lviv	Karpaty (original), Karpaty (later), Lviv, and Rukh
Mykolaiv Oblast	Mykolaiv	Mykolaiv
Odesa Oblast	Odesa	Chornomorets and Odesa
Poltava Oblast	Poltava	Poltava and Vorskla
Poltava Oblast	Kremenchuk	Kremin
Rivne Oblast	Rivne	Veres
Sumy Oblast	Okhtyrka	Naftovyk
Ternopil Oblast	Ternopil	Nyva
Vinnytsia Oblast	Vinnytsia	Nyva
Volyn Oblast	Lutsk	Volyn
Zakarpattia Oblast	Uzhhorod	Hoverla
Zakarpattia Oblast	Mynai	Mynai
Zaporizhia Oblast	Zaporizhia	Metalurh (original) and Torpedo
Zhytomyr Oblast	Zhytomyr	Polissya

== All-time table ==
All figures are correct through the 2025–26 season. Promotion/relegation playoff games are not included. Teams in bold currently compete in Premier League. Numbers in bold indicate the record values for each column.

clubs that lost professional status or were dissolved

Rank	Team	Seasons	P	W	D	L	GF	GA	GD	Pts	Achievement	First season	Last season
1	**Dynamo Kyiv**	**35**	**1026**	**739**	178	109	2200	704	**+1496**	**2395**	champions (17)	1992	2026/27
2	**Shakhtar Donetsk**	**35**	**1026**	728	150	148	**2202**	756	+1406	2334	champions (16)	1992	2026/27
3	FC Dnipro	26	765	379	199	187	1127	718	+409	1336	runners-up (2)	1992	2016/17
4	Vorskla Poltava (Note: The club withdrew in 2026 due to heavy debts from professional competition to recover.)	29	844	288	225	331	913	1010	−97	1089	3rd (2)	1996/97	2024/25
5	**Chornomorets Odesa**	28	823	294	198	331	908	1007	−99	1080	runners-up (2)	1992	2026/27
6	**Karpaty Lviv** (Note: The club was expelled from the UPL in 2020 for not showing up for matches. They withdrew from professional competition after 2021. At the same time, another team entered competition a tier lower. In 2023, the new Karpaty appealed to the CAS after realizing that FIFA had imposed debts against them for one of Karpaty's former players. CAS denied their appeal. However, the UPL statistics reflected as both clubs are a different entity. Since 2026, the UPL statistics was showing the Karpaty's performance old and new as one. Karpaty stats before 2021: 27 seasons, 800 games, 255 wins, 227 draws, 318 losses, 872 goals scored, 1003 goals conceded, –131 goals defference, 992 points.)	29	860	278	**245**	**337**	954	**1070**	−116	1079	3rd (1)	1992	2026/27
7	**Kryvbas Kryvyi Rih** (Note: The club lost professional status due to bankruptcy in 2013. They were reestablished, when in 2020 FC Hirnyk Kryvyi Rih decided to adopt the Kryvbas's legacy.)	25	754	256	201	297	797	918	−121	969	3rd (3)	1992/93	2026/27
8	Metalist Kharkiv (Note: Metalist was denied a license in 2016 for failing to pay debts and ceased operations afterwards. Eventually they were reestablished based on Metal Kharkiv.)	21	603	259	151	193	782	722	+60	928	runners-up (1)	1992	2022/23
9	**Zorya Luhansk**	25	700	256	154	290	835	959	−124	922	3rd (4)	1992	2026/27
10	Tavriya Simferopol (Note: The club was dissolved due to the Russo-Ukrainian War.)	23	681	237	170	274	795	873	−78	881	champions (1)	1992	2013/14
11	Metalurh Zaporizhya (Note: The club was dissolved due to bankruptcy.)	24	702	206	173	323	699	949	**−250**	791	4th (1)	1992	2015/16
12	Metalurh Donetsk (Note: Due to financial situation and hardship, being forced to play away from home because of the Russian aggression against Ukraine, in 2015 the club merged with FC Stal Kamianske.)	18	526	203	142	181	655	623	+32	751	3rd (3)	1997/98	2014/15
13	FC Mariupol (Note: The club was dissolved due to the Russo-Ukrainian War.)	22	638	197	153	288	715	932	−217	744	4th (3)	1997/98	2021/22
14	Arsenal Kyiv (Note: Being reorganized based on the first team of CSKA Kyiv in 2001–02, the club dissolved due to bankruptcy.)	19	568	191	156	221	654	675	−21	729	4th (1) (Note: Arsenal Kyiv's record includes the record of its predecessor CSKA Kyiv (when the club was sponsored by the Ministry of Defence). It does not include the 14 games that it played in 2013-14, which were annulled for that season.)	1995/96	2013/14
15	Volyn Lutsk (Note: The club was dissolved due to bankruptcy.)	16	472	140	102	230	473	710	−237	519	6th (1)	1992	2016/17
16	FC Oleksandriya (Note: The club was reformed in 2004 as a city team, in 2014 merged with FC UkrAhroKom Holovkivka.)	14	405	130	121	154	454	532	−78	511	runner-up (1)	2001/02	2025/26
17	Nyva Ternopil	10	296	93	62	141	319	388	−69	341	7th (3)	1992	2000/01
18	**Veres Rivne** (Note: The original club was liquidated in 2011 and in 2015 was revived as NK Veres Rivne. In 2018 it merged with FC Lviv, at the same time re-entering Second League)	9	268	70	80	118	257	366	−109	290	6th (1)	1992/93	2026/27
19	**Kolos Kovalivka**	7	198	67	55	76	190	226	−36	256	4th (1)	2019/20	2026/27
20	Zirka Kropyvnytskyi (Note: The original club dissolved in 2006 due to bankruptcy, was later revived based on the local football school Olimpik. In 2019, the team withdrew from professional competitions again.)	8	248	62	58	128	209	368	−159	244	6th (1)	1995/96	2017/18
21	SC Dnipro-1 (Note: The off-shot club that was created after the FIFA sanctions were applied to FC Dnipro forcing the latter to be relegated to amateurs. They went bankrupt abruptly in 2024.)	5	137	71	25	41	215	155	+60	238	runner-up (1)	2019/20	2023/24
22	Torpedo Zaporizhzhia (Note: The club dissolved due to bankruptcy)	7	210	64	42	104	214	315	−101	234	7th (2)	1992	1997/98
23	Olimpik Donetsk (Note: The club dissolved due to bankruptcy)	7	206	56	55	95	210	324	−114	223	4th (1)	2014/15	2020/21
24	Prykarpattya Ivano-Frankivsk (Note: The original club FC Prykarpattia dissolved due to bankruptcy.)	7	206	55	52	99	215	315	−100	217	10th (1)	1992	1999/00
25	Kremin Kremenchuk (Note: The club was dissolved.)	6	180	54	40	86	182	269	−87	202	9th (2)	1992	1996/97
26	Hoverla Uzhhorod (Note: The club was denied a license in 2016 for failing to pay salary to players and later was dissolved.)	9	256	41	64	151	186	421	−235	187	12th (3)	2001/02	2015/16
27	Rukh Lviv (Note: The club withdrew from competitions abruptly.)	6	163	44	54	65	168	206	−38	186	6th (1)	2020/21	2025/26
28	Obolon Kyiv (Note: The original club had dissolved in 2013. A new club was created in their place and restarted from the lower leagues.)	6	180	44	44	92	153	253	−100	176	6th (1)	2002/03	2011/12
29	Desna Chernihiv (Note: The club was dissolved due to the Russo-Ukrainian War.)	4	108	46	22	40	154	133	+21	160	4th (1)	2018/19	2021/22
30	Nyva Vinnytsia (Note: The club had dissolved a couple of times in 2005 and 2012 and later revived the same number of times.)	5	150	42	32	76	140	213	−73	158	10th (1)	1992	1996/97
31	**Polissia Zhytomyr**	3	90	44	25	21	128	79	+49	157	3rd (1)	2023/24	2026/27
32	FC Lviv (Note: The club dissolved due to bankruptcy)	6	168	34	41	93	131	269	−138	143	6th (1)	2008/09	2022/23
33	**LNZ Cherkasy**	3	90	36	24	30	95	88	+7	132	runners-up (1)	2023/24	2026/27
34	**FC Kharkiv**	4	108	30	35	43	108	147	−39	125	5th (1)	2021/22	2026/27
35	FC Kharkiv (2005) (Note: The club folded in 2010)	4	120	25	33	62	94	156	−62	108	12th (1)	2005/06	2008/09
36	SC Mykolaiv (Note: The club was dissolved due to the Russo-Ukrainian War.)	4	116	26	23	67	100	208	−108	101	13th (1)	1992	1998/99
37	Stal Kamianske (Note: The club dissolved in 2018)	3	90	24	24	42	72	106	−34	96	8th (2)	2015/16	2017/18
38	Inhulets Petrove	4	103	21	31	51	80	128	−48	94	12th (1)	2020/21	2024/25
39	**Obolon Kyiv**	3	90	20	29	41	65	133	−68	89	11th (1)	2023/24	2026/27
40	Temp Shepetivka (Note: The club was dissolved in 1995)	3	86	24	16	46	79	113	−34	88	9th (1)	1992	1994/95
41	**Bukovyna Chernivtsi**	3	82	23	18	41	69	99	−30	87	11th (1)	1992	2026/27
42	FC Mynai (Note: The club was dissolved)	4	104	18	32	54	77	160	−83	86	10th (1)	2020/21	2023/24
43	Stal Alchevsk (Note: The club was dissolved due to the Russo-Ukrainian War.)	3	86	17	21	48	67	126	−59	72	11th (1)	2000/01	2006/07
44	FC Sevastopol (Note: The club was dissolved due to the Russo-Ukrainian War.)	2	58	17	11	30	58	91	−33	62	9th (1)	2010/11	2013/14
45	Borysfen Boryspil (Note: The club was dissolved)	2	60	14	19	27	40	60	−20	61	7th (1)	2003/04	2004/05
46	Naftovyk-Ukrnafta Okhtyrka (Note: The club dissolved in 2018)	2	48	11	11	26	30	66	−36	44	15th (1)	1992	2007/08
47	**Epitsentr Kamianets-Podilskyi**	1	30	8	8	14	36	45	−9	32	10th	2025/26	2026/27
48	**FC Kudrivka**	1	30	7	7	16	32	48	−16	28	13th	2025/26	2026/27
49	**Livyi Bereh Kyiv**	1	30	7	5	18	18	39	-21	26	14th (1)	2024/25	2026/27
50	SC Poltava	1	30	2	7	21	23	74	−51	13	16th	2025/26	
51	SC Odesa (Note: The club merged with FC Chornomorets in 1999)	1	18	3	1	14	15	32	−17	10	20th	1992	

List of bankrupt clubs
Club	Notes
FC Dnipro (formerly Dnipro Dnipropetrovsk)	soon after playing at the 2015 UEFA Europa League Final, the club was forced into relegation due to ignoring the FIFA sanctions, and eventually its first team was dissolved
FC Metalist Kharkiv	denied license due to heavy debts
FC Hoverla Uzhhorod	denied license due to heavy debts
FC Kryvbas Kryvyi Rih	denied license for failure to provide evidence of stable financial support
FC Kharkiv	denied license for giving false documentation about financial condition in the club
FC Arsenal Kyiv	club was not able to finish the 2013–14 season
FC Arsenal-Kyiv Kyiv	is considered a direct successor of Arsenal Kyiv (2001–2013) soon after relegation in 2019 it announced about liquidation of its first team
FC Karpaty Lviv	was not able to finish the 2019–20 season and announced that it was bankrupt, but was allowed to keep professional status and restart at the third tier. In 2020 it was split, and the original club following 2020–21 was dissolved, while the newly formed was admitted to the third tier from amateurs.
SC Tavriya Simferopol	playing since 1958, the club became liquidated in 2014 by the Russian authorities following the occupation of the Autonomous Republic of Crimea. In 2016 it was revived based out of neighboring Kherson Oblast and playing in lower tiers until the full-scale Russian invasion in 2022.
FC Metalurh Zaporizhia	during the 2015–16 season on 2 March 2016, Metalurh was recognized as bankrupt on decision of the commercial court of Zaporizhzhia Oblast and a liquidation procedure was initiated.
FC Metalurh Donetsk	was merged with FC Stal Dniprodzerzhynsk in 2015, due to hardship caused by the 2014 Russian aggression against Ukraine
FC Mariupol	in connection with the full-scale invasion of Ukraine by Russia and occupation of the city of Mariupol, as well as financial inability to keep the club, on 27 April 2022 it was announced that the club withdraws from national competitions and dissolves.

=== List of the UPL recognized successions ===
- FC Arsenal Kyiv is a successor of the first team of FC CSKA Kyiv.
- **FC Kryvbas Kryvyi Rih** that was created out of FC Hirnyk Kryvyi Rih (another club from Kryvyi Rih) in 2020 is a successor of the original Kryvbas.
- FC Metalist Kharkiv, created in 2019 as Metal Kharkiv, in 2021 it was officially recognized as a successor of the Metalist that bankrupted back in 2016.

=== List of clubs with the same names but a different entity according to the UPL ===
- FC Obolon Kyiv and the Ukrainian Premier League do not recognize any heritage of the club (FC Obolon Kyiv) that existed before 2013.

== Post-season play-offs ==
There were several instances when the games outside of regular double round-robin tournament and split group seasons were scheduled or required. They were held either for determining the league position (golden and third place matches), international competitions qualification (Europa League play-off) or promotion or relegation (relegation play-off).

=== Golden matches ===
League finals for Premier League took place on two occasions. In the inaugural 1992 season, the league was conducted in two groups of 10 teams due to transition to the autumn-spring competition calendar. The teams in each group played a double round-robin tournament, after which the winners of both groups faced each other in the one-match league final at neutral field. The final was played on 21 June 1992, crowning Tavriya Simferopol as the first champions of independent Ukraine after their 1–0 win over Dynamo Kyiv.

Starting from the 2005–06 season, if multiple teams finish tied on points on the top of the table, Golden match is required to determine the champion. In the same season, this rule came into effect for the first and only to the moment time: Shakhtar Donetsk and Dynamo Kyiv both finished with 75 points after the regular season. In the following final game, Shakhtar managed to win the title after the 100th-minute goal from Julius Aghahowa which concluded their 2–1 extra-time win.

Season	Winner	Result	Runner-up	Venue	Date
1992	Tavriya Simferopol	1–0	Dynamo Kyiv	Ukraina Stadium, Lviv	21 June 1992
2005–06	Shakhtar Donetsk	2–1 (a.e.t.)	Dynamo Kyiv	Metalurh Stadium, Kryvyi Rih	14 May 2006

=== Third place matches ===
Similarly to the league final, in the inaugural 1992 season the third place match was played between the runners-up of both 10-team groups that formed the league in the season. In the game at neutral field, Dnipro Dnipropetrovsk from Group B defeated Shakhtar Donetsk from Group A 3–2 and won their first bronze medals in the league.

Season	Group A team	Result	Group B team	Venue	Date
1992	Shakhtar Donetsk	2–3	Dnipro Dnipropetrovsk	Metalurh Central Stadium, Zaporizhzhia	20 June 1992

=== Europa League play-offs ===
In the 2019–20 season, play-offs for qualification to the UEFA Europa League are played for the first time between the 5th and 6th teams from the Championship round and two top teams from the Relegation round (7th and 8th). The play-off consists of the semi-final and final stages, with ties in both played as single matches on the field of the team ranked higher in the season standings.

Season	Home team	Result	Away team	Venue	Date
2019–20	Semi-finals				
2019–20	FC Oleksandriya	1–2	FC Mariupol	CSC Nika Stadium, Oleksandriya	25 July 2020
2019–20	Kolos Kovalivka	4–1	Dnipro-1	NSC Olimpiyskiy, Kyiv	25 July 2020
2019–20	Final				
2019–20	Kolos Kovalivka	1–0 (a.e.t.)	FC Mariupol	NSC Olimpiyskiy, Kyiv	29 July 2020

=== Emergency mini tournament ===
On 22 July 2024, the UAF executive committee approved that the club that will replace SC Dnipro-1 should be the winner of the transitional tournament, the organization of which was awarded to the UPL. The draw of the tournament was scheduled for the same date. The tournament was decided to include three games (two semifinals and a final) on 26 and 30 July 2024. The tournament was won by Livyi Bereh that gained promotion to the 2024–25 Ukrainian Premier League.

Season	Home team	Result	Away team	Venue	Date
2024–25	Semi-finals				
2024–25	Livyi Bereh Kyiv	1–1 (5–4 p)	Metalist 1925 Kharkiv	Arena Livyi Bereh, Hnidyn	26 July 2024
2024–25	Epitsentr Kamianets-Podilskyi	3–3 (3–5 p)	FC Mynai	Stadion Avanhard, Rivne	26 July 2024
2024–25	Final				
2024–25	Livyi Bereh Kyiv	3–0	FC Mynai	Stadion Avanhard, Rivne	30 July 2024

Livyi Bereh Kyiv won the Mini tournament by beating in the final game Mynai, thus gaining promotion in place of SC Dnipro-1. Epitsentr Kamianets-Podilskyi remained in the Ukrainian First League, while Mynai and Metalist 1925 Kharkiv both were relegated to the Ukrainian First League.

=== Relegation play-offs ===
For the first time, a play-off to determine the participants of the next Vyshcha Liha season was held unplanned at the end of the 1998–99 season. Third-placed team of 1998–99 First League, Torpedo Zaporizhzhia, which was to be promoted, filed for bankruptcy at the end of the season. The league regulations at the time did not specify what actions are needed to be taken in such situation, so PFL made a decision to held a play-off game between the highest-ranked relegated team, Prykarpattia Ivano-Frankivsk, and highest-ranked not promoted team, FC Cherkasy at neutral field in Kyiv. The game ended with Prykarpattia defending their league place 3–1.

In the 2001–02 season, due to league enlargement play-off was held between the second-lowest Vyshcha Liha team, Polihraftekhnika Oleksandriya, and the fourth First League team, Polissya Zhytomyr. The game on a neutral field in Kyiv ended 1–0 in favour of Oleksandriya.

Since 2017–18 season, the play-offs have been held in a home-and-away format between the 10th and 11th teams from the Premier League, and the 2nd and 3rd from the First League. During this time, 3 teams were promoted by play-offs, and another 1 managed to defend its place. However, in the 2019–20 season and 2020–21 season there were no playoffs because of the league enlargement, and three teams were promoted from the First League directly. In the 2021–22 season play-offs were not conducted as the championship ceased halfway due to the 2022 Russian full-scale invasion of Ukraine.

Season	Premier League team	Result	First League team	Venue	Date
1998–99	Prykarpattia Ivano-Frankivsk	3–1	FC Cherkasy	Dynamo Stadium, Kyiv	4 July 1999
2001–02	Polihraftekhnika Oleksandriya	1–0	Polissya Zhytomyr	CSK ZSU Stadium, Kyiv	16 June 2002
2017–18	Zirka Kropyvnytskyi	1–1; 0–4	Desna Chernihiv	Home and away	23 and 27 May 2018
2017–18	Chornomorets Odesa	1–0; 0–3 (a.e.t.)	FC Poltava	Home and away	23 and 27 May 2018
2018–19	Karpaty Lviv	0–0; 3–0*	Volyn Lutsk	Home and away	4 and 8 June 2019
2018–19	Chornomorets Odesa	0–0; 0–2	Kolos Kovalivka	Home and away	4 and 8 June 2019
2022–23	Inhulets Petrove	1–1; 1–2	LNZ Cherkasy	Home and away	10 and 14 June 2023
2022–23	Veres Rivne	6–1; 0–1	Metalurh Zaporizhzhia	Home and away	10 and 14 June 2023
2023–24	Veres Rivne	1–1 3–1	Epitsentr Kamianets-Podilskyi	Home and away	29 May and 2 June 2024
2023–24	Obolon Kyiv	1–0 1–1	Livyi Bereh Kyiv	Home and away	29 May and 2 June 2024
2024–25	Vorskla Poltava	2–1 0–1 (3–4 p)	FC Kudrivka	Home and away	29 May and 1 June 2025
2024–25	Livyi Bereh Kyiv	0–1 0–1	Metalist 1925 Kharkiv	Home and away	29 May and 1 June 2025
2025–26	FC Kudrivka	0–0 2–2 (3–2 p)	Ahrobiznes Volochysk	Home and away	5 and 9 June 2026
2025–26	FC Oleksandriya	1–1 0–1	Livyi Bereh Kyiv	Home and away	5 and 9 June 2026

Notes:
* – a technical result, the match result was determined by the league's administration.

== Rivalries and city derbies ==
=== Klasychne derby ===
The central feature of the league is a rivalry between Shakhtar Donetsk and Dynamo Kyiv which has adopted its name as Klasychne derby. The rivalry started ever since the end of the 1990s when both teams started consistently to place the top two places from season to season. The rivalry became really established when Shakhtar obtained its first national title in 2002.

=== Other championship contenders ===
The surprising win of the first season by SC Tavriya Simferopol has never turned the club into a real contender for another title and the club was not always successful to secure a place among the top five. In the beginning of the 1990s, FC Chornomorets Odesa and the two-time Soviet champions FC Dnipro were also among the main contenders. The 1972 Soviet champions FC Zorya Luhansk until 2013 really struggled to stay in the top league. Among other contenders there were FC Metalist Kharkiv that were the league's runners-up in 2012–13 and FC Metalurh Donetsk that showed some consistent form in the early 2000s.

=== Other rivalries ===
There are few smaller regional rivalries such between Karpaty and Volyn, Metalist and Dnipro, Zorya and Shakhtar.

Among city derbies, there were no running city derbies in the league for the 2017–18 season. Among the most notable previously there were Zaporizhzhia derby between Metalurh and Torpedo, Kyiv derby between Dynamo and Arsenal (CSKA), Donetsk derby between Shakhtar and Metalurh. Other derbies existed in Lviv, Odesa, Kharkiv, West Ukrainian football derby and others.

== Stadiums and attendance ==
Ukraine has several big stadiums with capacity of 30,000+ spectators and at least two stadiums with capacity of over 50,000 which also are considered to be by UEFA the elite stadiums. Since the 2014 Russian aggression against Ukraine, the access to some stadiums was restricted. Many stadiums in Ukraine and their surrounding infrastructure were renovated in preparation to the Euro 2012.

=== UEFA Elite Stadiums ===
#	Stadium	Capacity	City	Club	Opened
1	Olimpiysky National Sports Complex	70,050	Kyiv	Ukraine, Dynamo Kyiv	1923, 2011
2	Donbass Arena	52,518	Donetsk	Shakhtar Donetsk	2009

=== Other major stadiums ===
Among 30,000+ football stadiums or multi-use stadiums adopted for football are Arena Lviv, Chornomorets Stadium, Dnipro-Arena, Metalist Stadium and others.

Other UEFA 4-category stadiums in the league:

#	Stadium	Capacity	City	Club	Opened	UEFA category
1	Metalist Stadium	40,003	Kharkiv	Metalist Kharkiv; Metalist 1925 Kharkiv	1926	4/4 stars
2	Arena Lviv	34,915	Lviv	Lviv; Rukh Lviv	2011	4/4 stars
3	Chornomorets Stadium	34,164	Odesa	Chornomorets Odesa	1935 (Note: The Central Stadium of the Black Sea Shipping Company was completely rebuilt in 2011)	4/4 stars
4	Dnipro-Arena	31,003	Dnipro	Dnipro; Dnipro-1	1940 (Note: Original Metalurh Stadium was completely rebuilt in 2008)	4/4 stars
5	Butovsky Vorskla Stadium	24,795	Poltava	Vorskla Poltava	1951	4/4 stars
6	Slavutych-Arena	11,883	Zaporizhzhia	Metalurh Zaporizhya; Zorya Luhansk	1938 (Note: Original Metalurh Stadium was completely rebuilt in 2006)	4/4 stars

=== Attendance ===
Source:

== See also ==
- Ukrainian First League
- Ukrainian Second League
- Ukrainian derby
- Football records in Ukraine
- List of foreign Ukrainian Premier League players
