= Thomas Grimm =

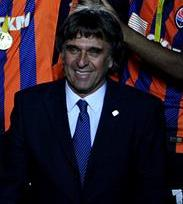
- Thomas Grimm

President of Ukrainian Premier League
- In office 6 April 2018 – 5 April 2020
- Preceded by: Volodymyr Heninson
- Succeeded by: Yevhen Dykyi (acting)

Personal details
- Born: 3 April 1959 (age 67) Lüscherz, Canton of Bern, Switzerland

Thomas Grimm (Ukrainian: Томас Ґрімм; born 3 April 1959 in Lüscherz) is a Swiss lawyer and football official, who has served as the president of the Ukrainian Premier League since 2018.

== Biography ==
Grimm was born on 3 April 1959 in the Swiss village of Lüscherz. In 1987 he graduated from the jurisprudence faculty of the University of Bern. He then went on to head a legal department at UEFA from 1992 to 1995. During that time Grimm also sat on various UEFA working committees. Between 1996 and 2001 he worked as a lawyer for CWL Telesport and Marketing AG (later known as Infront Sports & Media).

Between 2002 and 2005 Grimm worked as secretary on a committee that had been set up to reassess the FIFA statutes.

Between 2007 and 2009 Grimm was president of the Swiss football club BSC Young Boys, and between 2009 and 2011 he was president of the Swiss Football League.

Concurrently, between 2009 and 2013, he also worked in various functions for FIFA, UEFA and EFPL as well as sitting on the board of directors for the lower-league Swiss football club FC Biel-Bienne.

Later, Grimm also worked as a legal adviser for the Ukraine national football team during Euro 2016 and for the Football Federation of Ukraine on issues relating to the 2017-18 UEFA Champions League final, played at the Olimpiyskiy National Sports Complex.

In 2018 Grimm was elected as the president of the Ukrainian Premier League by a majority of votes. His contract expired on 5 April 2020 and he expressed no interest in running for another term. However, due to the ongoing COVID-19 pandemic elections were suspended and governing of the league was taken over by its general director until the next elections.

Sporting positions
Preceded by Peter Mast	President of BSC Young Boys; 2007–2009	Succeeded by Werner Müller
Preceded by Volodymyr Heninson	President of Ukrainian Premier League; 6 April 2018 – 5 April 2020	Succeeded by Yevhen Dykyi (acting)
