= Oleksandr Hranovskyi (businessman) =

Ukrainian businessman

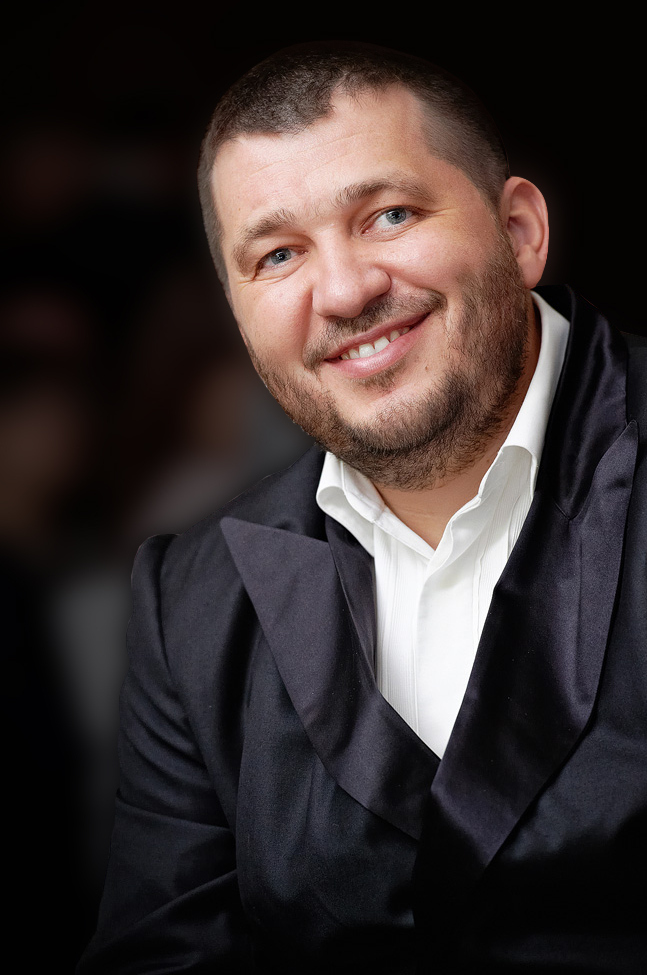
Oleksandr Hranovskyi

Oleksandr Hranovskyi (born July 31, 1972, in Uman, Ukraine), is a Ukrainian businessperson, shareholder at Vertex United.

== Education ==
- Odesa University, Faculty of Law.
- National Academy for Public Administration under the President of Ukraine

== Business ==
As of 1 July 2014, Oleksandr Hranovskyi is a co-owner of Vertex United, holding company managing the following assets:

- Finance: PJSC “FinBank”.
- Hotel business (4-5-star hotels): President Hotel, Bristol Hotel, Londonskaya Hotel, other hospitality objects.

== Controversy ==
Oleksandr was reported to have been arrested in the month of December 2022, for being "suspected of creating organized criminal group (OCG) together with businessman Borys Kaufman in Odesa." This occurred about 48 hours after he was tried in absentia.

== Finances ==
Oleksandr Hranovskyi four times fell into the rating of the "Focus" magazine "200 richest people of Ukraine" (in 2009, 2010, 2011, 2012).

According to the results of 2013, Oleksandr Hranovskyi's estate was valued at 87.5 million dollars.

== Activity timeline ==
Activity
Entrepreneurial
1993	Chief commercial officer, chief construction officer, Evas (Odessa).
1997	Co-founder and CEO, Odessa-based Montazhgorstroi.
1998	Co-founder of VIP Odessa and trading house Kashtan
2001	“Businessman of the Year” in Odessa (People’s Choice Award 2001).; Vice-president, Football Federation of Ukraine (until 2012).
2002	Transfer of business assets to the management of Hennadiy Hranovskyi, Oleksandr Hranovskyi's father.
2006	Development of Trading House “Myagkov” in Russia. Forming of logistics center and federal distribution.
2008	Change of business strategy. Sale of “Myagkov” trademark and Trading House “Myagkov” to a large Russian producer – “Sinergiya” concern – with further IPO.; Sale of “Odesa Plant of Sparkling Wines” (“Odesa”, “L’Odessika” and “HenryRederer” trademarks) to an international Italian company GruppoCampari.; Creation of Vertex United in partnership with Boris Kaufman, which united assets across several business lines: hotels – (4-5-star hotels): President Hotel, Bristol Hotel, Londonskaya Hotel, other hospitality objects; assets of JSC “FinBank”; investment and development assets – magazines “Focus”, “Focus. Krasivaya Strana”, website focus.ua.
Political
2002–2006	People's deputy of Ukraine elected to the 4th Verkhovna Rada from Social Democratic Party of Ukraine (united), member of Verkhovna Rada Budget Committee.

He was not elected in the 2019 Ukrainian parliamentary election after losing his constituency in Kharkiv with 15% of the votes.
