= Borys Kaufman =

Ukrainian businessman

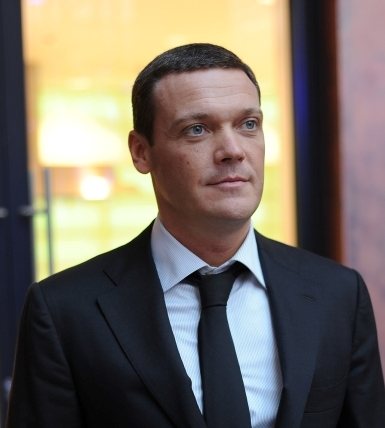
- Portrait of Boris Kaufman
- Born: 25 November 1973 (age 52); Odesa, Soviet Union (now Ukraine)
- Occupation: Businessman
- Known for: stakeholder at Vertex United

Borys Rafailovych Kaufman (Ukrainian: Борис Рафаїлович Кауфман; born 25 November 1973), is a Ukrainian businessperson, shareholder at Vertex United.

== Odessa Airport Ltd. ==
In 2011 ownership of 75% of Odesa International Airport was transferred to Odesa Airport Development Limited, controlled by Borys Kaufman and Oleksandr Hranovskyi. As of 2022 the businessmen were reconstructing the airport.

On 7 September 2023 the High Anti-Corruption Court of Ukraine arrested Kaufman with a bail of 268 million Ukrainian hryvnia in a criminal case regarding the alleged illegal seizure of Odesa International Airport.
