= 2025–26 Ukrainian Cup =

2025–26 VBET Ukrainian Cup
Tournament details
- Country: Ukraine
- Dates: 8 August 2025–20 May 2026; 8-10 August 2025 (qualification round); 22 August 2025–20 May 2026 (main event)
- Teams: 68

Final positions
- Champions: Dynamo Kyiv (14th title)
- Runners-up: Chernihiv
- Semifinalists: Bukovyna Chernivtsi; Metalist 1925 Kharkiv
- UEFA Europa League: Dynamo Kyiv

Tournament statistics
- Matches played: 67
- Goals scored: 170 (2.54 per match)
- Attendance: 48,210 (720 per match)
- Top goal scorer(s): Peter Itodo (5 goals)
- All statistics correct as of 20 May 2026.

The 2025–26 Ukrainian Cup was the 34th annual season of Ukraine's football knockout competition and the 3rd during the full-scale Russian invasion. It is sponsored by the betting company VBET. The Ukrainian Cup is the main domestic cup competition for men's football teams in Ukraine. The competition started on 9 August 2025 and was concluded with the final on 20 May 2026 in Lviv.

Defending champions Shakhtar Donetsk, having beaten Dynamo Kyiv in the 2025 final to win their record-setting 15th title, were eliminated by their last season's final opponents Dynamo Kyiv in the Round of 16.

Dynamo Kyiv, last year's finalists, eventually won their 14th Ukrainian Cup, defeating Ukrainian First League side Chernihiv and qualified for the first qualifying round of the 2026-27 UEFA Europa League.

With the ongoing Russo-Ukrainian war, teams from cities in occupied or bordering regions with the Russian Federation, such as Donetsk, Luhansk, Kharkiv, Sumy, and others, were forced to play in other locations. Many games had to be postponed or rescheduled due to continuous air raids from the Russian Federation.

== Highlights and changes to the format ==
All competition stages consisted of a single game, with a home-field advantage granted to a team from a lower league in the first two rounds. Draw was blind for all stages except the qualification round.

Changes to the competition format were announced during the last season. The intent was to allow more amateur-level teams to participate in the competition. The major change for this season is that teams from the regional associations (in addition to AAFU members) are participating for the first time since 1996.

This season, four teams represented the Ukrainian Association of Amateur Football as the Ukrainian Amateur Cup's best performers (all semifinalists), instead of two. Later, due to the sudden withdrawal of FC Mynai, the number was increased by one.

On 7 May 2025, the Ukrainian Association of Football (UAF) agreed with the Ukrainian Premier League teams on their participation in this season's competition in a new format.

Among other changes, it was agreed that there would be no extra time after a match is tied; instead, the only tiebreaker is a penalty shootout.

Compared with the previous season, the prize awarding fund was increased by 25%. It was planned to pay 70% to the hosting teams and 30% to the visiting teams.

In addition, the competition administration (UAF) presented a new trophy along with a new slogan for the tournament: "Honor to oneself, glory to Ukraine." The previous trophy with Nike has been replaced with a new one that featured a mace variation, Bulava.

Also, the hosting team was selected differently from one stage to another. At the very start, the qualification/preliminary round, the hosting team was selected by draw. In the Round of 64 and Round of 32, the hosting team was determined as the one that plays in a lower league than the other team. If both teams were from the same league, the hosting team was identified as the one that received an odd number during a draw. For the rounds of 16, quarterfinals, and semifinals, the hosting team is also determined as the one that received an odd number during a draw. For the final, the hosting team was determined by a draw.

The video assistant referee service for this competition was approved for the 24 stadiums mentioned in the competition's regulations.

== Team allocation and schedule ==
The competition includes all professional first teams from the Premier League (16/16 teams of the league), First League (16/16), Second League (16/23) as well as 20 amateur teams including 4 best performers from the previous year's Amateur Cup and 16 from regional associations.

Distribution
	Teams entering this round	Teams advancing from the previous round
Qualification round (16 teams)	16 entrants from regional associations	
Round of 64 (56 teams)	12 entrants of the Premier League; 16 entrants of the First League; 15 entrants of the Second League; 5 entrants of the 2024–25 Amateur Cup	8 winners from the Qualification round
Round of 32 (16 teams)	4 entrants from the Premier League	28 winners from the Round of 64

=== Rounds schedule ===
Phase	Round	Number of fixtures	Clubs remaining	Winner's prize money	Loser's prize money	Draw date	Game date
Qualification		8	16 → 8	₴ 100,000		17 July 2025	9-10 August 2025
Main event	Round of 64	28	56 → 28	₴ 150,000		13 August 2025	23-24 August 2025
Main event	Round of 32	16	32 → 16	₴ 200,000		28 August 2025	17-24 September 2025
Main event	Round of 16	8	16 → 8			26 September 2025	28-30 October 2025
Main event	Quarter-finals	4	8 → 4			28 November 2025	3-17 March 2026
Main event	Semi-finals	2	4 → 2	₴ 800,000	₴ 600,000	19 March 2026	21-22 April 2026
Main event	Final	1	2 → 1	₴ 2,500,000	₴ 1,500,000	19 March 2026	20 May 2026

=== Teams ===
Enter in Qualification	Enter in Round of 64				Enter in Round of 32
Regional associations 16 teams	AAFU; 4 teams	PFL League 2; 16/23 teams	PFL League 1; 16/16 teams	UPL; 12/16 teams	UPL; 4/16 teams
Ahron Velyki Hayi (Ternopil); Fazenda Chernivtsi (Chernivtsi); Hirnyk Novoyavorivsk (Lviv); Iron Zaporizhzhia (Zaporizhzhia); Carbon Cherkasy (Cherkasy); Kolos Polonne (Khmelnytskyi); Korosten Ahro-Nyva (Zhytomyr); Lehiya Kyiv (Kyiv city); LSTM 536 Lutsk (Volyn); Medeya - Nevytskyi zamok (Zakarpattia); Naftovyk Dolyna (Ivano-Frankivsk); Nika SMK Bohodukhiv (Kharkiv); FC Novoukrayinka (Kirovohrad); Olympia Savyntsi (Poltava); Palmira Odesa (Odesa); Polissya Stavky Piskivka (Kyiv)	Ahrotekh Tyshkivka; Denhoff Denykhivka*; Kormil Yavoriv*; Mayak Sarny; Avanhard Lozova* (added)	Atlet Kyiv*; Chaika P. Borshchahivka; Dinaz Vyshhorod; Hirnyk-Sport; Kulykiv-Bilka; FC Lisne*; Lokomotyv Kyiv; Metalurh Zaporizhzhia; Nyva Vinnytsia; Penuel Kryvyi Rih*; Real Pharma Odesa; Rebel Kyiv*; Skala Stryi; FC Trostianets; FC Uzhhorod; SC Vilkhivtsi	Ahrobiznes Volochysk; Bukovyna Chernivtsi; FC Chernihiv; Chornomorets Odesa; Feniks-Mariupol; Inhulets Petrove; Livyi Bereh Kyiv; Metalist Kharkiv; FC Mynai (removed); Nyva Ternopil; Podillya Khmelnytskyi; Probiy Horodenka; Prykarpattia Ivano-Frankivsk; UCSA Tarasivka; Viktoriya Sumy; Vorskla Poltava	Epitsentr Kamianets-P.; Karpaty Lviv; Kolos Kovalivka; Kryvbas Kryvyi Rih; FC Kudrivka; LNZ Cherkasy; Metalist 1925 Kharkiv; Obolon Kyiv; SC Poltava; Rukh Lviv; Veres Rivne; Zorya Luhansk	Dynamo Kyiv; FC Oleksandriya; Polissya Zhytomyr; Shakhtar Donetsk

Notes:

- With the asterisk (*) are noted the Second League teams that were recently admitted to the league from amateurs and the AAFU (amateur) team(s) that qualified in addition to the Amateur Cup finalist(s).
- Seven reserve teams from the PFL League 2 were not eligible to participate.
- Right before the first draw, there were some changes to the pool of participants. Palmira Odesa replaced Atletyk Odesa, Iron Zaporizhzhia replaced Metalurh Zaporizhzhia football school.
- During the Round of 64 draw on August 13, 2025, the Ukrainian Association of Football announced that there will be 5 teams from the 2024–25 Ukrainian Amateur Cup instead of 4. Due to the withdrawal of FC Mynai, an amateur side, Avanhard Lozova, was added instead. In the season's regulations, only four AAFU participants were mentioned and 16 representatives of the regional associations (Article 3, paragraph 4). At the same time, Metalurh, which had just been relegated to the Second League, had their relegation canceled, so the number of teams in the Second League decreased by one more.
- Teams that were making their first appearance (20): Ahron Velyki Hayi, Ahrotekh Tyshkivka, Atlet Kyiv, Carbon Cherkasy, Denhoff Denykhivka, Hirnyk Novoyavorivsk, IRON Zaporizhia, Kolos Polonne, Kormil Yavoriv, Korosten/Ahro-Nyva, Lehiya Kyiv, Lisne, LSTM 536 Lutsk, Mayak Sarny, Medeya - Nevytskyi zamok, NIKA SMK Bohodukhiv, Novoukrayinka, Penuel Kryvyi Rih, Polissya Stavky, Rebel Kyiv.

== Bracket ==
The following is the tournament bracket that demonstrates the last five rounds of the Ukrainian Cup, including the final match. Numbers in parentheses next to the match score represent the results of a penalty shoot-out.

Round of 32; 17–24 September 2025
17 September 2025
Livyi Bereh Kyiv	0
Viktoriya Sumy	1
24 September 2025
Inhulets Petrove	4
Podillya Khmelnytskyi	1
17 September 2025
Polissya Stavky	0
Shakhtar Donetsk	1
17 September 2025
FC Oleksandriya	1
Dynamo Kyiv	2
18 September 2025
Bukovyna Chernivtsi	1
Karpaty Lviv	0
18 September 2025
Nyva Ternopil	3
SC Poltava	0
17 September 2025
Metalist Kharkiv	0
LNZ Cherkasy	2
24 September 2025
Rukh Lviv	3
Polissya Zhytomyr	0
24 September 2025
Nyva Vinnytsia	7
Hirnyk-Sport Horishni Plavni	0
24 September 2025
Lokomotyv Kyiv	1
Veres Rivne	0
23 September 2025
Denhoff Denykhivka	0
Ahrobiznes Volochysk	2
24 September 2025
Kolos Polonne	1
Metalist 1925 Kharkiv	4
17 September 2025
FC Chernihiv	3
Kryvbas Kryvyi Rih	0
23 September 2025
Olimpiya Savyntsi	1
FC Lisne	2
18 September 2025
Metalurh Zaporizhia	1 (2)
Feniks-Mariupol (p)	1 (4)
24 September 2025
Ahrotekh Tyshkivka (p)	1 (5)
Chornomorets Odesa	1 (3)

Round of 16; 28–30 October 2025
29 October 2025
Viktoriya Sumy	0
Inhulets Petrove	1
29 October 2025
Dynamo Kyiv	2
Shakhtar Donetsk	1
28 October 2025
Bukovyna Chernivtsi	2
Nyva Ternopil	1
29 October 2025
LNZ Cherkasy	1
Rukh Lviv	0
28 October 2025
Lokomotyv Kyiv	1
Nyva Vinnytsia	0
30 October 2025
Metalist 1925 Kharkiv	4
Ahrobiznes Volochysk	3
28 October 2025
FC Chernihiv (p)	1 (4)
FC Lisne	1 (3)
30 October 2025
Ahrotekh Tyshkivka	1 (6)
Feniks-Mariupol (p)	1 (7)

Quarter-finals; 3-18 March 2026
3 March 2026
Dynamo Kyiv	2
Inhulets Petrove	0
4 March 2026
LNZ Cherkasy	0 (4)
Bukovyna Chernivtsi (p)	0 (5)
5 March 2026
Metalist 1925 Kharkiv	3
Lokomotyv Kyiv	0
18 March 2026
FC Chernihiv (p)	0 (5)
Feniks-Mariupol	0 (4)

Semi-finals; 21-22 April 2026
21 April 2026
Bukovyna Chernivtsi	0
Dynamo Kyiv	3
22 April 2026
Metalist 1925 Kharkiv	0 (5)
FC Chernihiv (p)	0 (6)

Final; 20 May 2026
20 May 2026
FC Chernihiv	1
Dynamo Kyiv	3

== Competition schedule ==
Legends: AM – AAFU (amateur) competitions (IV or lower tiers), 2L – Second League (III tier), 1L – First League (II tier), PL – Premier League (I tier)

=== Qualification round (1/64) ===
In this round, 16 clubs from the regional associations play each other to determine 8 winners who will proceed to the Round of 64.

The draw was held on 17 July 2025 with the participation of Dmytro Mykhaylenko. Right before the draw, all participants of the qualification round were placed in four regional groups of four (A, B, C, D). On 7 August 2025, the locations and referees for the qualification round were confirmed.

Group A	Group B	Group C	Group D
(Lviv Oblast) Hirnyk; (Zakarpattia Oblast) Medeya-Nevytskyi Zamok; (Ivano-Frankivsk Oblast) Naftovyk; (Chernivtsi Oblast) Fazenda	(Volyn Oblast) LutskSanTekhMontazh No.536; (Ternopil Oblast) Ahron; (Zhytomyr Oblast) Korosten/Ahro-Nyva; (Khmelnytskyi Oblast) Kolos	(Kyiv) Lehiya; (Kyiv Oblast) Polissya Stavky; (Cherkasy Oblast) Carbon; (Odesa Oblast) Palmira	(Zaporizhia Oblast) Iron; (Kirovohrad Oblast) Novoukrainka; (Kharkiv Oblast) Nika SMK; (Poltava Oblast) Olympia

Number of teams per tier remaining in the competitions in this round (Note: Yellow/tan color indicates that teams from that tier enter the competition in the next rounds; green color indicates that teams from that tier participate in the current round. The competition does not allow participation of second teams or reserves.)
Ukrainian Premier League (1)	Ukrainian First League (2)	Ukrainian Second League (3)	Ukrainian Association of Amateur Football (4)	Regional football associations of Ukraine (5)	Total
16 / 16	16 / 16	15 / 15	5 / 5	16 / 16	68 / 68

8 August 2025	Iron Zaporizhzhia (AM)	5 – 1	(AM) FC Novoukrainka	Zaporizhzhia
12:30	Lomaka 3', 35'; Petrenko 9'; Okatyi 38'; Chernikov 58'	Report	Tyupa 66'	Stadium: Slavutych-Arena; Referee: Andriy Voyevoda (Dnipro)

8 August 2025	Lehiya Kyiv (AM)	0 – 4	(AM) Polissya Stavky	Kyiv
18:00		Report	Maksymets 29'; Holovko 69'; Malyey 74'; Duchev 90+1'	Stadium: Zmina; Referee: Pavlo Detsyuk (Chernihiv)

9 August 2025	Olympia Savyntsi (AM)	4 – 0	(AM) Nika SMK Bohodukhiv	Myrhorod, Poltava Oblast
13:00	Bohomaz 17'; Koshman 26'; Spivak 73'; Rudenko 87'	Report		Stadium: Start; Referee: Serhiy Dubykivskyi (Kyiv Oblast)

9 August 2025	Hirnyk Novoyavorivsk (AM)	1 – 1 (3–4 p)	(AM) Naftovyk Dolyna	Novoiavorivsk, Lviv Oblast
13:00	Slonevskyi 86'	Report	Bahday 56'	Stadium: Miskyi; Referee: Ivan Mandzyuk (Ternopil Oblast)
	Penalties
	Slonevskyi (penalty missed); Zubar (penalty scored); Verbnyi (penalty missed); Poruchynskyi (penalty scored); Mizernyk (penalty scored); Barylyak (penalty missed)		Dyakiv (penalty scored); Shyshka (penalty missed); Petryk (penalty missed); Ostapchuk (penalty scored); Husak (penalty scored); Pastukh (penalty scored)

9 August 2025	Carbon Cherkasy (AM)	2 – 1	(AM) Palmira Odesa	Heronymivka, Cherkasy Oblast
13:00	Tenzhytskyi 6'; Shvydenko 39'; Vlasenko (yellow card) 61' (yellow-red card) 76'	Report	Barsukov 64'	Stadium: LNZ training field Referee: Oleksiy Harkusha (Kyiv)

9 August 2025	Korosten Ahro/Nyva (AM)	1 – 0	(AM) LSTM 536 Lutsk	Korosten, Zhytomyr Oblast
16:00	Shatukha (penalty missed) 53'; Shatukha 53'; Hryb (penalty missed) 75'	Report		Stadium: Spartak; Referee: Oleh Olkhovskyi (Luhansk)

10 August 2025	Fazenda Chernivtsi (AM)	1 – 1 (4–3 p)	(AM) Medeya-Nevytskyi Zamok	Chernivtsi
13:00	Berbeka 85'	Report	Rusyn 83' (pen.) (Note: In other sources, the goal was scored by Ivan Kovach (Fazenda v Medeya).)	Stadium: Olimpiya; Attendance: 208; Referee: Myroslav Lypko (Ivano-Frankivsk)
	Penalties
	Masikevych (penalty scored); Yankov (penalty scored); Lakhman (penalty scored); Duchak (penalty missed); Pavlyuk (penalty missed); Todorovych (penalty scored)		Kovach (penalty scored); Seleshchuk (penalty scored); Maryukhnych (penalty missed); Soskyda (penalty missed); Rusyn (penalty scored); Kobelyash (penalty missed)

10 August 2025	Kolos Polonne (AM)	0 – 0 (5–3 p)	(AM) Ahron Velyki Hayi	Polonne, Khmelnytskyi Oblast
13:00		Report		Stadium: Polon; Attendance: 300; Referee: Mykola Baidyuk (Chernivtsi)
	Penalties
	Strashkevych (penalty scored); Bartoshuk (penalty scored); Morozov (penalty scored); Nosarev (penalty scored); Chepelyuk (penalty scored)		Hromyak (penalty scored); Kokhman (penalty scored); Shcherbatyuk (penalty missed); Mostovyi (penalty scored)

Notes

- During the match Korosten/Ahro-Nyva versus LSTM No.536 Artem Fedetskyi who was playing for LSTM was ejected on the 73rd minutes. That was not recorded in the UAF report.

=== Round of 64 (1/32) ===
In this round, 12 clubs from the Premier League, 16 clubs from the First League, 15 (Note: Following withdrawal of FC Mynai, Metalurh remained in the 2nd tier.) clubs from the Second League, and 5 teams of the last season Amateur Cup entered the competition and joined the 8 winners of the Qualification round (all amateurs).

The draw was held on 13 August 2025 with the participation of Oleh Luzhnyi among others. On 20 August 2025, the UAF approved and confirmed all times and locations of the upcoming matches of the Round of 64.

Number of teams per tier remaining in the competition in this round
Ukrainian Premier League (1)	Ukrainian First League (2)	Ukrainian Second League (3)	Ukrainian Association of Amateur Football (4)	Regional football associations of Ukraine (5)	Total
16 / 16	16 / 16	15 / 15	5 / 5	8 / 16	60 / 68

22 August 2025	Mayak Sarny (AM)	0 – 2	(1L) Metalist Kharkiv	Sarny, Rivne Oblast
13:00		Report	Dihtyar 16', 55'; Porokh (yellow card) 44' (yellow-red card) 43' (Note: In the official report by UAF, Bohdan Porokh was ejected a minute before he was cautioned (Mayak v Metalist).)	Stadium: Mriya; Attendance: 2,200; Referee: S.Lapko (Lviv)

22 August 2025	Viktoriya Sumy (1L)	1 – 0	(1L) Vorskla Poltava	Trostianets, Sumy Oblast
13:00	Shpyryonok 24'; Shershen (yellow card) 86' (yellow-red card) 90+2'	Report		Stadium: imeni Kutsa; Referee: M.Skrypnyk (Kyiv Oblast)

22 August 2025	Carbon Cherkasy (AM)	1 – 2	(1L) Inhulets Petrove	Heronymivka, Cherkasy Oblast
15:30	Koshelyuk 8'	Report	Kasimov 3'; Farasieienko 49'	Stadium: LNZ training field Referee: P.Plieshko (Kremenchuk)

22 August 2025	Lokomotyv Kyiv (2L)	2 – 2 (4–2 p)	(PL) Kolos Kovalivka	Kyiv
17:30	O.Savchuk 3'; P.Savchuk 51'	Report	Tsurikov (penalty missed) 66'; Klymchuk 86'; Bezruchuk 90+5' (Note: In other sources, the goal was scored by Yuriy Klymchuk, second in the match (Lokomotyv v Kolos).)	Stadium: imeni Bannikova; Attendance: 480; Referee: A.Zaitsev (Donetsk Oblast)
	Penalties
	Mordas (penalty scored); Mochevinskyi (penalty scored); Sakhnenko (penalty scored); Titarenko (penalty scored)		Husol (penalty missed); Bondarenko (penalty scored); Krasniqi (penalty scored); Burda (penalty missed)

23 August 2025	Iron Zaporizhzhia (AM)	1 – 5	(PL) SC Poltava	Zaporizhzhia
12:00	Okatyi 61'	Report	Marusych 31'; Onishchenko 77', 88'; Pidlepych 82'; Plakhtyr 83'	Stadium: Slavutych-Arena; Attendance: 278; Referee: D.Reznikov (Kamianske)

23 August 2025	Olympia Savyntsi (AM)	1 – 1 (3–1 p)	(2L) SC Vilkhivtsi	Myrhorod, Poltava Oblast
12:00	Rudenko (yellow card) 7' (yellow-red card) 44'	Report	Shostak 26'; Abramov 58' (o.g.)	Stadium: Start; Attendance: 275; Referee: S.Dubykivskyi (Kyiv Oblast)
	Penalties
	Karetnyk (penalty scored); Koshman (penalty scored); Kovtun (penalty scored)		Nemchaninov (penalty scored); Botskiv (penalty missed); Panasenko (penalty scored); Funduk (penalty missed)

23 August 2025	Denhoff Denykhivka (AM)	2 – 2 (11–10 p)	(1L) Prykarpattia Ivano-Frankivsk	Denykhivka, Kyiv Oblast
13:00	Mykolayuk 13'; Hurenko 90+4'	Report	Tsyutsyura 73'; Barchuk 79'	Stadium: Denykhivka Arena; Referee: V.Faida (Lviv)
	Penalties
	Lystopad (penalty scored); Shulypa (penalty scored); Zozulya (penalty scored); Zhykol (penalty scored); Hurenko (penalty scored); Brovko (penalty missed); Somov (penalty scored); Kalchuk (penalty scored); Yuzefovych (penalty scored); Yatsyk (penalty scored); Starchenko (penalty scored); Lystopad (penalty scored)		Tsyutsyura (penalty scored); Barchuk (penalty scored); Henyk (penalty scored); Frantsuz (penalty scored); Shvets (penalty scored); Trofymyuk (penalty missed); Solovyov (penalty scored); Demkiv (penalty scored); Radulskyi (penalty scored); Chushenko (penalty scored); Barasyuk (penalty scored); Tsyutsyura (penalty missed)

23 August 2025	Ahrotekh Tyshkivka (AM)	1 – 1 (7–6 p)	(PL) Epitsentr Kamianets-Podilskyi	Tyshkivka, Kirovohrad Oblast
13:00	Chychykov 65'	Report	Myronyuk 83'	Stadium: Tyshkivskyi Litsei; Referee: P.Detsyuk (Chernihiv)
	Penalties
	Zahalskyi (penalty scored); Kovalenko (penalty scored); Popchuk (penalty missed); Manastyrnyi (penalty missed); Radchenko (penalty scored); Sokolan (penalty scored); Bizhko (penalty scored); Khorolskyi (penalty scored); Ponomarenko (penalty scored)		Zaporozhets (penalty scored); Yanakov (penalty scored); Myronyuk (penalty missed); Hryhorashchuk (penalty missed); Boryachuk (penalty scored); Sydun (penalty scored); Supryaha (penalty scored); Bendera (penalty scored); Savchuk (penalty missed)

23 August 2025	Chornomorets Odesa (1L)	2 – 1	(PL) Zorya Luhansk	Odesa
13:00	Lopyryonok 11'; Khoblenko 77'	Report	Budkivskyi 50'	Stadium: Chornomorets; Attendance: 1,700; Referee: D.Osaulenko (Kyiv)

23 August 2025	Fazenda Chernivtsi (AM)	0 – 1	(1L) Metalurh Zaporizhzhia	Chernivtsi
13:00		Report	Irodovskyi 71' (pen.)	Stadium: Bukovyna; Attendance: 900; Referee: I.Sadkovskyi (Ternopil Oblast)

23 August 2025	Avanhard Lozova (AM)	0 – 3	(1L) Bukovyna Chernivtsi	Poltava
14:00		Report	Boychuk 16', 58'; Morhovskyi 78'	Stadium: Molodizhnyi; Referee: A.Ukhov (Kryvyi Rih)

23 August 2025	Probiy Horodenka (1L)	0 – 1	(PL) LNZ Cherkasy	Horodenka, Ivano-Frankivsk Oblast
14:00		Report	Dajko 54'	Stadium: Probiy Arena; Attendance: 1,770; Referee: I.Stashuk (Chernihiv)

23 August 2025	Korosten/Ahro-Nyva (AM)	0 – 4	(PL) Veres Rivne	Korosten, Zhytomyr Oblast
14:00		Report	Kharatin 39' (pen.); Cipot 74'; Ndukve 76'; Wesley 85'	Stadium: Spartak; Attendance: 1,155; Referee: I.Salash (Kalush)

23 August 2025	Hirnyk-Sport Horishni Plavni (2L)	0 – 0 (4–3 p)	(2L) FC Trostianets	Horishni Plavni, Poltava Oblast
14:00		Report		Stadium: Yunist; Referee: R.Dubyna (Dnipro)
	Penalties
	Kozak (penalty missed); Tkach (penalty scored); Plys (penalty scored); Vasylchenko (penalty scored); Chukwuemeka (penalty scored)		Tyshyninov (penalty missed); Kovalskyi (penalty scored); Khussin (penalty scored); Kovalenko (penalty scored); Blyznyuk (penalty missed)

23 August 2025	Skala 1911 Stryi (2L)	0 – 0 (4–5 p)	(1L) Podillya Khmelnytskyi	Stryi, Lviv Oblast
15:30		Report		Stadium: Sokil; Attendance: 653; Referee: M.Baydyuk (Chernivtsi)
	Penalties
	Lukyanchenko (penalty scored); Shevchuk (penalty scored); Nykolyshyn (penalty scored); Zhumiha (penalty missed); Merdyeyev (penalty scored)		Shavrin (penalty scored); Savchuk (penalty scored); Kvasov (penalty scored); Lys (penalty scored); Azizov (penalty scored)

23 August 2025	Livyi Bereh Kyiv (1L)	0 – 0 (3–0 p)	(PL) FC Kudrivka	Hnidyn, Kyiv Oblast
18:00		Report		Stadium: Arena Livyi Bereh; Attendance: 712; Referee: R.Blavatskyi (Lviv)
	Penalties
	Dedukh (penalty scored); Wendell (penalty scored); Sidnney (penalty scored)		(penalty missed) Lytovchenko; (penalty missed) Kozak; (penalty missed) Shapoval

24 August 2025	Kolos Polonne (AM)	0 – 0 (4–1 p)	(AM) Naftovyk Dolyna	Polonne, Khmelnytskyi Oblast
13:00		Report		Stadium: Polon; Referee: I.Mandzyuk (Ternopil Oblast)
	Penalties
	Nosarev (penalty scored); Strashkevych (penalty scored); Bartoshuk (penalty scored); Chepelyuk (penalty scored)		(penalty scored) Korpan; (penalty missed) Dyakiv; (penalty missed) Obamina

24 August 2025	Penuel Kryvyi Rih (2L)	0 – 8	(PL) Karpaty Lviv	Lviv
13:00		Report	Adamyuk 24', 43'; Krasnopir 47'; Paulo Vitor 55'; Klymenko 62'; Tanda 67'; Bruninho 82'; Neves 90'	Stadium: Ukraina; Attendance: 2,500; Referee: D.Kubryak (Odesa)

24 August 2025	Kulykiv-Bilka (2L)	0 – 3	(PL) Kryvbas Kryvyi Rih	Kulykiv, Lviv Oblast
14:00		Report	Lin 51', 56'; Tverdokhlib 55'	Stadium: Kulykiv Arena; Attendance: 550; Referee: O.Kalyonov (Khmelnytskyi)

24 August 2025	Kormil Yavoriv (AM)	1 – 2	(PL) Rukh Lviv	Yavoriv, Lviv Oblast
15:00	Hladkyi (yellow card) 42' (yellow-red card) 44'; Polyuha 54' (pen.)	Report	Faal 73'; Klayver 81'	Stadium: imeni Smuka; Attendance: 800; Referee: A.Mykhailyuk (Kyiv)

24 August 2025	FC Uzhhorod (2L)	1 – 2	(1L) Feniks-Mariupol	Uzhhorod
15:30	Emere 54'	Report	Sydorenko 25', 29'	Stadium: Avanhard; Attendance: 390; Referee: T.Kozak (Lviv Oblast)

24 August 2025	Nyva Vinnytsia (2L)	(3 – 0) (Note: Administrative score. The original score 1–3 was annulled on the decision of the UAF Control and Disciplinary Committee.)	(1L) UCSA Tarasivka	Vinnytsia
15:30	Kolchin 56'	Report	Matheus Pagliarini 19', 26'; Matheus Fogo 90+1'	Stadium: Nyva training field Attendance: 100; Referee: O.Tytov (Donetsk)

24 August 2025	Metalist 1925 Kharkiv (PL)	2 – 0	(PL) Obolon Kyiv	Zhytomyr
18:00	Itodo 8'; Mba 87' (Note: In other sources, the second goal was an own goal from Obolon player, Valeriy Dubko (Metalist 1925 v Obolon).)	Report		Stadium: Tsentralnyi; Attendance: 500; Referee: M.Raida (Zakarpattia Oblast)

25 August 2025	Real Pharma Odesa (2L)	0 – 3	(1L) Nyva Ternopil	Odesa
13:00		Report	Davydov 60'; Mysyk 78'; Bey 81' (pen.)	Stadium: Ivan; Referee: O.Harkusha (Kyiv)

25 August 2025	Chaika Petropavlivska Borshchahivka (2L)	0 – 4	(2L) FC Lisne	Sofiivska Borshchahivka, Kyiv Oblast
14:00		Report	Kalinin 8'; Kobak 27', 39' (pen.); Kovalenko 50'	Stadium: Kolos training field Referee: Ye.Makarenko (Sumy)

25 August 2025	Dinaz Vyshhorod (2L)	0 – 3	(1L) Ahrobiznes Volochysk	Demydiv, Kyiv Oblast
15:30		Report	Nyzhnyk 34' (pen.); Bohomaz 55'; Len 78'	Stadium: Dinaz; Referee: Ye.Kievlich (Kropyvnytskyi)

25 August 2025	Atlet Kyiv (2L)	0 – 1	(1L) FC Chernihiv	Kyiv
15:30	Kramarenko (red card) 55'	Report	Shushko 51'	Stadium: Atlet; Referee: M.Lypko (Ivano-Frankivsk)

25 August 2025	Polissya Stavky (AM)	3 – 0	(2L) Rebel Kyiv	Kyiv
15:30	Maksymets 25'; Rudenko 64'; Malyey 90'	Report	Harbar (red card) 55'	Stadium: Temp; Attendance: 162; Referee: A.Hordynskyi (Vinnytsia)

=== Round of 32 (1/16) ===
In this round, 4 clubs from the Premier League joined the 28 winners of the Round of 64 (7 clubs from Premier League, 12 clubs from First League, 4 clubs from Second League, and 5 clubs from amateurs).

The draw was held on 28 August 2025. The dates were confirmed on 11 September 2025.

Number of teams per tier remaining in the competition in this round
Ukrainian Premier League (1)	Ukrainian First League (2)	Ukrainian Second League (3)	Ukrainian Association of Amateur Football (4)	Regional football associations of Ukraine (5)	Total
11 / 16	12 / 16	4 / 15	2 / 5	3 / 16	32 / 68

17 September 2025	Metalist Kharkiv (1L)	0 – 2	(PL) LNZ Cherkasy	Uzhhorod
13:00		Report	Tankovskyi 22'; Assinor 53' (pen.)	Stadium: Avanhard; Referee: Oleksandr Solovyan (Kyiv Oblast)

17 September 2025	FC Chernihiv (1L)	(3 – 0) (Note: Administrative score. The original score 1–1 (1–3 p) was annulled on the decision of the UAF Control and Disciplinary Committee.)	(PL) Kryvbas Kryvyi Rih	Chernihiv
13:00	Koydan 47' (pen.) (Note: In official UAF report Myronenko scored on 48th minute, not from the penalty spot (Chernihiv v Kryvbas).)	Report	Tverdokhlib 45+1' (pen.) (Note: In official UAF report Tverdokhlib scored on 5th minute (Chernihiv v Kryvbas).)	Stadium: Chernihiv Arena; Referee: Volodymyr Novokhatniy (Cherkasy)
	Penalties
	Novikov (penalty scored); Bybik (Note: as Babik in the UAF official report (Chernihiv v Kryvbas)) (penalty missed); Kartushov (penalty missed); Sakhno (penalty missed)		(penalty scored) Tverdokhlib; (penalty missed) Shevchenko; (penalty scored) Mendoza; (penalty scored) Paraco

17 September 2025	Polissya Stavky (AM)	0 – 1	(PL) Shakhtar Donetsk	Bucha, Kyiv Oblast
15:30		Report	Meirelles 45'	Stadium: Stadion Yuvileinyi; Referee: Dmytro Yevtukhov (Dnipro)

17 September 2025	Livyi Bereh Kyiv (1L)	0 – 1	(1L) Viktoriya Sumy	Hnidyn, Kyiv Oblast
15:30	Hunichev (red card) 90+5'	Report	Dudnyk 24'; Knysh (yellow card) 14' (yellow-red card) 27'	Stadium: Arena Livyi Bereh; Referee: Maksym Firsov (Rivne)

17 September 2025	FC Oleksandriya (PL)	1 – 2	(PL) Dynamo Kyiv	Oleksandriia, Kirovohrad Oblast
18:00	Buletsa 58'	Report	Pikhalyonok 22'; Ogundana 85'	Stadium: Nika; Referee: Oleksandr Omelchenko (Slovyansk)

18 September 2025	Metalurh Zaporizhzhia (1L)	1 – 1 (2–4 p)	(1L) Feniks-Mariupol	Zaporizhzhia
13:00	Irodovskyi 45+1'	Report	Remenyak 53'	Stadium: Slavutych-Arena; Referee: Dmytro Osaulenko (Kyiv)
	Penalties
	Nekhtiy (penalty missed); Irodovskyi (penalty scored); Rudavskyi (penalty scored); Savitskyi (penalty missed)		(penalty scored) Remenyak; (penalty scored) Bilyi; (penalty scored) Sydorenko; (penalty scored) Buryak

18 September 2025	Bukovyna Chernivtsi (1L)	1 – 0	(PL) Karpaty Lviv	Chernivtsi
15:30	Kozhushko 17'	Report		Stadium: Bukovyna; Referee: Yevhen Tsybulko (Cherkasy Oblast)

18 September 2025	Nyva Ternopil (1L)	3 – 0	(PL) SC Poltava	Ternopil
18:30	Rezepov 39'; Mykhalchuk 75'; Davydov 88'	Report		Stadium: Miskyi imeni Shukhevycha; Referee: Sofiya Prychyna (Lviv Oblast)

23 September 2025	Olympia Savyntsi (AM)	1 – 2	(2L) FC Lisne	Myrhorod, Poltava Oblast
13:00	Malyk 49'	Report	Rybalka 12' (pen.); Voloshyn 78'; Voloshyn (yellow card) 59' (yellow-red card) 85'	Stadium: Start; Referee: Lyudmyla Telbukh (Dnipro)

23 September 2025	Denhoff Denykhivka (AM)	0 – 2	(1L) Ahrobiznes Volochysk	Kovalivka, Kyiv Oblast
15:30		Report	Kuzmyn 51'; Syomka 58'	Stadium: Kolos; Referee: Serhiy Podryhulia (Lutsk)

24 September 2025	Ahrotekh Tyshkivka (AM)	1 – 1 (5–3 p)	(1L) Chornomorets Odesa	Tyshkivka, Kirovohrad Oblast
13:00	Pastukhov 18'	Report	Luifer 73'	Stadium: Tyshkivka Lyceum; Referee: A.Zaitsev (Donetsk Oblast)
	Penalties
	Zahalskyi (penalty scored); Kovalenko (penalty scored); Kovalyov (penalty scored); Chychykov (penalty scored); Pastukhov (penalty scored)		(penalty scored) Habelok; (penalty scored) Kulach; (penalty missed) Luifer; (penalty scored) Kratov

24 September 2025	Inhulets Petrove (1L)	4 – 1	(1L) Podillya Khmelnytskyi	Petrove, Kirovohrad Oblast
13:00	Farasyeyenko 43'; Hadzhuk 73'; Dzen 90+1'; Yanovich 90+4'	Report	Profatylo 7'; Kozyrenko (red card) 89'	Stadium: Inhulets; Referee: Mykhailo Raida (Zakarpattia Oblast)

24 September 2025	Nyva Vinnytsia (2L)	7 – 0	(2L) Hirnyk-Sport Horishni Plavni	Vinnytsia
15:30	Zahorulko 16', 30'; Pohorilyi 18', 61'; Lototskyi 49'; Petlenko 63'; Petryk 86'	Report		Stadium: Nyva training field Referee: M.Lypko (Ivano-Frankivsk)

24 September 2025	Lokomotyv Kyiv (2L)	1 – 0	(PL) Veres Rivne	Kyiv
15:30	Mordas 40' (pen.)	Report		Stadium: imeni Bannikova; Referee: Serhiy Zadyran (Kyiv Oblast)

24 September 2025	Kolos Polonne (AM)	1 – 4	(PL) Metalist 1925 Kharkiv	Khmelnytskyi
15:30	Yakubov 75'	Report	Mba 54'; Itodo 63'; Lytvynenko 90+3'; Karpizin 90+4'	Stadium: Podillia; Referee: I.Salash (Kalush)

24 September 2025	Rukh Lviv (PL)	3 – 0	(PL) Polissya Zhytomyr	Lviv
18:00	Faal 30'; Lyakh 72'	Report	Bezkorovainyi 63' (o.g.)	Stadium: Ukraina; Referee: Denys Reznikov (Kamianske)

Notes:

- Soon after the match against FC Chernihiv, Kryvbas Kryvyi Rih released its official statement, in an apologetic manner, asking its fans to be forgiven.

=== Round of 16 (1/8) ===
This round includes 16 clubs (5 clubs from Premier League, 7 clubs from First League, 3 clubs from Second League, and an amateur club). The draw was held on 26 September 2025. Among notable football celebrities, Serhiy Rebrov participated in the draw ceremony.

Number of teams per tier remaining in the competition in this round
Ukrainian Premier League (1)	Ukrainian First League (2)	Ukrainian Second League (3)	Ukrainian Association of Amateur Football (4)	Regional football associations of Ukraine (5)	Total
5 / 16	7 / 16	3 / 15	1 / 5	0 / 16	16 / 68

28 October 2025	FC Chernihiv (1L)	1 – 1 (4–3 p)	(2L) FC Lisne	Chernihiv
12:00	Romanchenko 77' (pen.)	Report	Rybalka 90+3' (pen.)	Stadium: Chernihiv Arena; Referee: N.Dyord (Uzhhorod)
	Penalties
	Romanchenko (penalty missed); Porokhnya (penalty scored); Shumylo (penalty scored); Chaban (penalty scored); Novikov (penalty scored)		(penalty missed) Voloshyn; (penalty scored) Harmash; (penalty scored) Rybalka; (penalty scored) Kovalenko; (penalty missed) Hryshchenko

28 October 2025	Lokomotyv Kyiv (2L)	1 – 0	(2L) Nyva Vinnytsia	Kyiv
14:30	Sakhnenko (yellow card) 53' (yellow-red card) 78'; Konovalov 90+1'	Report		Stadium: imeni Bannikova; Referee: M.Firsov (Rivne)

28 October 2025	Bukovyna Chernivtsi (1L)	2 – 1	(1L) Nyva Ternopil	Chernivtsi
14:30	Pidlepenets 37'; Stasyuk 44'	Report	Bey 90+2'	Stadium: Bukovyna Stadium; Attendance: 4,126; Referee: D.Osaulenko (Kyiv)

29 October 2025	Viktoriya Sumy (1L)	0 – 1	(1L) Inhulets Petrove	Trostianets, Sumy Oblast
12:00	Palamar (penalty missed) 15'	Report	Melenchuk 50'	Stadium: imeni Kutsa; Attendance: 60; Referee: O.Kalyonov (Khmelnytskyi)

29 October 2025	LNZ Cherkasy (PL)	1 – 0	(PL) Rukh Lviv	Cherkasy
14:30	Obah 55'	Report		Stadium: Cherkasy Arena; Attendance: 680; Referee: O.Omelchenko (Slovyansk)

29 October 2025	Dynamo Kyiv (PL)	2 – 1	(PL) Shakhtar Donetsk	Kyiv
18:00	Yarmolenko 72'; Guerrero 79'	Report	Meirelles 49'	Stadium: Dynamo imeni Lobanovskoho; Attendance: 4,333; Referee: D.Panchyshyn (Kharkiv)

30 October 2025	Ahrotekh Tyshkivka (AM)	1 – 1 (6–7 p)	(1L) Feniks-Mariupol	Kropyvnytskyi
12:00	Chychykov 77'	Report	Vilkhovyi 38'	Stadium: Zirka; Referee: O.Solovyan (Kyiv Oblast)
	Penalties
	Zahalskyi (penalty scored); Kovalenko (penalty scored); Kovalyov (penalty scored); Chychykov (penalty missed); Pastukhov (penalty scored); Monastyrnyi (penalty scored); Bizhko (penalty scored); Bovtunenko (penalty missed)		(penalty scored) Bohdanov; (penalty scored) Remenyak; (penalty scored) Sydorenko; (penalty scored) Radchenko; (penalty missed) Hahun; (penalty scored) Petko; (penalty scored) Yanchak; (penalty scored) Horin

30 October 2025	Metalist 1925 Kharkiv (PL)	4 – 3	(1L) Ahrobiznes Volochysk	Zhytomyr
17:00	Itodo 6', 45'; Kalyuzhnyi 18'; Antyukh 50'	Report	Voytikhovskyi 66'; Havrushko 69'; Tolochko 90+1'	Stadium: Polissya; Attendance: 402; Referee: M.Kozyryatskyi (Zaporizhia)

=== Quarter-finals (1/4) ===
This round includes 8 clubs: 3 clubs from Premier League, 4 clubs from First League and 1 club from Second League. Draws was held on 28 November 2025.

Number of teams per tier remaining in the competition in this round
Ukrainian Premier League (1)	Ukrainian First League (2)	Ukrainian Second League (3)	Ukrainian Association of Amateur Football (4)	Regional football associations of Ukraine (5)	Total
3 / 16	4 / 16	1 / 15	0 / 5	0 / 16	8 / 68

3 March 2026	Dynamo Kyiv (PL)	2–0	(1L) Inhulets Petrove	Kyiv
18:00	Guerrero 50'; Pikhalyonok 84'	Report		Stadium: Dynamo imeni Lobanovskoho; Attendance: 1,125; Referee: Oleksandr Shandor (Lviv)

4 March 2026	LNZ Cherkasy (PL)	0–0 (4–5 p)	(1L) Bukovyna Chernivtsi	Cherkasy
16:30		Report		Stadium: Cherkasy Arena; Attendance: 890; Referee: Dmytro Panchyshyn (Kharkiv)
	Penalties
	Tankovskyi (penalty scored); Didyk (penalty scored); Kuzyk (penalty scored); Assinor (penalty missed); Mykytyshyn (penalty scored); Horin (penalty missed)		(penalty scored) Dakhnovskyi; (penalty scored) Vitenchuk; (penalty scored) Boychuk; (penalty scored) Busko; (penalty missed) Voitykhovskyi; (penalty scored) Plaksa

5 March 2026	Metalist 1925 Kharkiv (PL)	3–0	(2L) Lokomotyv Kyiv	Kovalivka, Kyiv Oblast
13:00	Zabërgja 15'; Itodo 69'; Rashica 90+2'	Report		Stadium: Kolos; Attendance: 586; Referee: Viktor Kopiyevskyi (Kropyvnytskyi)

18 March 2026	FC Chernihiv (1L)	0–0 (5–4 p)	(1L) Feniks-Mariupol	Chernihiv
13:30		Report		Stadium: Chernihiv Arena; Attendance: 300; Referee: K.V. Zabroda (Kyiv)
	Penalties
	Shapoval (penalty scored); Novikov (penalty missed); Teplyakov (penalty scored); Shalfeyev (penalty scored); Romanchenko (penalty scored); Shumylo (penalty scored)		(penalty scored) Remenyak; (penalty scored) Radchenko; (penalty missed) Sydorenko; (penalty scored) Balaba; (penalty scored) Bohdanov; (penalty missed) Horin

=== Semi-finals (1/2) ===
This round includes 4 clubs: 2 clubs from Premier League, 2 clubs from First League. The draw was held on 19 March 2026.

Number of teams per tier remaining in the competition in this round
Ukrainian Premier League (1)	Ukrainian First League (2)	Ukrainian Second League (3)	Ukrainian Association of Amateur Football (4)	Regional football associations of Ukraine (5)	Total
2 / 16	2 / 16	0 / 15	0 / 5	0 / 16	4 / 68

21 April 2026	Bukovyna Chernivtsi (1L)	0–3	(PL) Dynamo Kyiv	Ternopil
18:00		Report	Ponomarenko 23', 82'; Voloshyn 43'	Stadium: Ternopilskyi miskyi imeni Shukhevycha; Attendance: 14,500; Referee: O. Afanasyev (Kharkiv)

22 April 2026	Metalist 1925 Kharkiv (PL)	0–0 (5–6 p)	(1L) FC Chernihiv	Zhytomyr
20:00		Report	Shushko (red card) 5'	Stadium: Tsentralnyi Stadion; Attendance: 526; Referee: V.Romanov (Dnipro)
	Penalties
	Kalyuzhnyi (penalty scored); Antyukh (penalty scored); Baptistella (penalty scored); Arevalo (penalty missed); Moura (penalty scored); Pavlyuk (penalty scored); Mba (penalty missed)		(penalty scored) Shapoval; (penalty scored) Shalfeyev; (penalty scored) Teplyakov; (penalty missed) Porokhnya; (penalty scored) Romanchenko; (penalty scored) Bezghubchenko; (penalty scored) Zenchenko

=== Final ===
Number of teams per tier remaining in the competition in this round
Ukrainian Premier League (1)	Ukrainian First League (2)	Ukrainian Second League (3)	Ukrainian Association of Amateur Football (4)	Regional football associations of Ukraine (5)	Total
1 / 16	1 / 16	0 / 15	0 / 5	0 / 16	2 / 68

20 May 2026

Chernihiv (1L)	1–3	(PL) Dynamo Kyiv
Romanchenko 34'	Report	Buyalskyi 26', 53'; Yarmolenko 70'

Arena Lviv, Lviv
Attendance: 4,889
Referee: Oleksandr Shandor (Lviv)

=== Matches affected by air raid alerts ===
Round of 64
Livyi Bereh vs Kudrivka. The match had been interrupted during the game break for 11 minutes.
Polissya vs Rebel. The start of the match had been postponed for 15 minutes.
Round of 32
Oleksandriya vs Dynamo. The start of the match had been postponed for an hour.
Olimpiya vs Lisne. The match had been interrupted twice during the first half and later during the game break for a total of almost 3 hours, extending the match to over 4 hours.
Quarter-finals
LNZ vs Bukovyna. The match started an hour later due to an air raid alarm.
Chernihiv vs Feniks-Mariupol. Originally scheduled on 17 March 2026, the match was postponed due to the prolonged air raid alarm.
Semi-finals
Metalist 1925 vs Chernihiv. The match started two hours later due to an air raid alarm.
Final
Chernihiv vs Dynamo. The match started a few minutes later due to an air raid alarm.

== Statistics ==
=== Top goalscorers ===
The competition's top goalscorers, including those from the preliminary rounds.
As of 20 May 2025

Rank	Scorer	Team	Goals (Pen.)
1	(Nigeria) Peter Itodo	Metalist 1925 Kharkiv	5 (0)
2	30 player(s)		2
32	103 player(s)		1
0	own goal(s)		2

Notes:

- Own goals scored: Mykhailo Abramov (SC Vilkhivtsi vs Olympia Savyntsi), Danylo Bezkorovainyi (Polissya Zhytomyr vs Rukh Lviv)

== Prize money ==
On 29 July 2026, the Ukrainian Association of Football (UAF) published its report explaining the prize money payouts. The UAF also indicated that the organization fully paid game broadcasting, and all participants were completely free from these expenditures.

The prize money was paid based on the stage each team reached and the team's status at that stage, whether they were a host or a guest. Note: each hosting team had certain obligations connected to the organization of each game, according to the competition regulation articles 6 and 7. The amount of the payout was cumulative for each stage. In total, with the help of its main sponsor Vbet, the UAF paid 17,800,000 hryvnias.

Prize money (in thousand hryvnia)
Stage	No. Ties	Host	Guest	Per tie	Total
Qualification	8	70	30	100	800
Round of 64	28	105	45	150	4,200
Round of 32	16	140	60	200	3,200
Round of 16	8	210	90	300	2,400
Quarterfinals	4	280	120	400	1,600
Semifinals	2	560	240	800	1,600
Final	1	2,500	1,500	4,000	

== See also ==
- 2025–26 Ukrainian Premier League
- 2025–26 Ukrainian Second League
- 2025–26 Ukrainian First League
- 2025–26 Ukrainian Amateur Cup
- 2025–26 Ukrainian Football Amateur League
- 2025–26 Ukrainian Premier League Under-19
- 2025–26 Ukrainian Women's Top League
- List of Ukrainian football transfers summer 2025
- List of Ukrainian football transfers winter 2025–26
