= 2025–26 Ukrainian Football Amateur League =

Ukrainian Football season

Ukrainian Amateur Football Championship
- Season: 2025–26
- Dates: Group stage: 16 August 2025 – 24 May 2026; Winter break: 16 November 2025 – 22 March 2026; Play-offs: 30 May – 26 June 2026
- Teams: 19
- Final stage winner: Ahrotekh Tyshkivka (2nd title) Kormil Yavoriv (losing finalist)
- Promoted: 4 – Avanhard, Carbon, Bratslav, Dnister
- Top goalscorer: Yevheniy Sokolan (16)

The 2025–26 Ukrainian football championship among amateur teams was the 30th season since it replaced the football championship of physical culture teams. The league competition is organized by the Association of Amateur Football of Ukraine (AAFU).

== Format ==
The competition format remained unchanged; however, the number of participants decreased from 20 to 18 (19 later). As in the previous season, the competitions consisted of two stages, where in the first stage, participants were set to play in two groups a double round-robin tournament, followed by the second stage, the top teams would qualify for the postseason play-off to determine the league's champion.

== Teams ==
10 teams from last season reapplied for this season, including last season's winner, Dnister Zalishchyky.

=== Returning/reformed clubs ===
- Mayak Sarny – (returning, last played during 2021–22 season)

=== Debut ===
List of teams that are debuting this season in the league:

- FC Bratslav (late start)
- FC Kostopil
- Carbon Cherkasy (Note: (a participant of the 2024 PFL tournament))
- FC Rokyta
- Kormil Yavoriv
- To4ka Odesa
- Korosten/Ahro-Nyva (Note: Korosten/Ahro-Nyva is a merger of two clubs, Mal Korosten and Ahro-Nyva Narodychi that took place earlier in 2025, with Mal Korosten being considered as the club's predecessor. On the other hand, the UAF statisticians consider the club related to SC Korosten/FC Korosten.)
- FC Trostianets

=== Withdrawn teams ===
List of clubs that took part in last year's competition, but chose not to participate in the 2025–26 season:

- Feniks Pidmonastyr
- Halych Zbarazh
- Sokil Mykhailivka-Rubezhivka

List of clubs that withdrew during the season or right after it:

- Standard Novi Sanzhary (April 1)

=== Location map ===
The following displays the location of teams.

Location of teams in the 2025-26 Ukrainian Amateur League
— Group A — Group B

=== Stadiums ===
Group A

Team	Pop. place	Stadium	Position in 2024–25
Dnister	Zalishchyky	Dnister	Am1, 2nd
Ahron	Velyki Hai	(Village Stadium)	Am1, 3rd
Mykolaiv	Mykolaiv	Miskyi	Am1, 4th
Kolos	Polonne	Polon	Am1, 5th
Vivad	Romaniv	Tsentralnyi	Am1, 7th
Ahro-Nyva	Korosten	Spartak	Reg
Kormil	Yavoriv	imeni Smuka	Reg
Kostopil	Kostopil	Kolos	Reg
Mayak	Sarny	Mriya	Reg
Trostianets	Trostianets	(village stadium)	Reg

Group B

Team	Pop. place	Stadium	Position in 2024–25
Ahrotekh	Tyshkivka	Litsei-Arena	Am2, 1st
Avanhard	Lozova	DYuSSh Stadium, Yuriivka, Dnipropetrovsk Oblast	Am2, 3rd
Olympia	Savyntsi	Start, Myrhorod	Am2, 5th
Naftovyk	Okhtyrka	Naftovyk	Am2, 6th
Standart	Novi Sanzhary	(Town Stadium); Kolos-Arena, Mahdalynivka, Dnipropetrovsk Oblast	Am2, 7th
Karbon	Cherkasy	LNZ training field, Heronymivka; Zorya, Bilozirya	Reg
Bratslav	Bratslav	Nyva training field, Vinnytsia	Reg
Rokyta	Rokyta	Arena Rokyta	Reg
To4ka	Odesa	Shkilnyi, Chornomorsk	Reg

Notes:

- Reg — regional championship (Regions of Ukraine)
- Am[#] — AAFU championship where sign (#) indicates Group number

== Group stage ==
=== Group 1 ===
Pos	Team	Pld	W	D	L	GF	GA	GD	Pts	Promotion, qualification or relegation
1	Ahron Velyki Hayi (Q, C)	18	10	5	3	25	15	+10	35	Qualification to final stage
2	Dnister Zalishchyky (Q)	18	10	4	4	36	15	+21	34	Qualification to final stage Admission to Ukrainian Second League
3	Kormil Yavoriv (Q)	18	7	8	3	29	15	+14	29 (Note: Head-to-head points: Kormil 4, Mykolaiv 1.)	Qualification to final stage
4	Mykolaiv (Q)	18	9	2	7	30	21	+9	29	Qualification to final stage
5	Mayak Sarny	18	7	6	5	17	13	+4	27	
6	Trostianets	18	6	7	5	22	22	0	25	
7	VIVAD Romaniv	18	5	6	7	16	15	+1	21	
8	Kolos Polonne	18	5	5	8	19	25	−6	20	
9	Kostopil	18	3	3	12	12	43	−31	12	
10	Korosten/Ahro-Nyva	18	1	8	9	18	40	−22	11	Withdrawn after the season

Source: AAFU
Rules for classification: 1) Points; 2) Head-to-head points; 3) Head-to-head wins; 4) Head-to-head goal difference; 5) Head-to-head goals scored; 6) Goal difference; 7) Goals scored; 8) Draw of lots.
(C) Group winner; (Q) Qualification to the phase indicated
Notes:

Notes

- Three scheduled games were postponed to the second half of the season.

=== Group 2 ===
Pos	Team	Pld	W	D	L	GF	GA	GD	Pts	Promotion, qualification or relegation
1	Avanhard Lozova (Q, C)	16	11	3	2	44	18	+26	36	Qualification to final stage Admission to Ukrainian Second League
2	Rokyta (Q)	16	11	3	2	34	19	+15	36	Qualification to final stage
3	Ahrotekh Tyshkivka (Q)	16	11	2	3	43	16	+27	35	Qualification to final stage
4	Olympia Savyntsi (Q)	16	9	5	2	36	17	+19	32	Qualification to final stage
5	Carbon Cherkasy	16	8	1	7	39	35	+4	25	Admission to Ukrainian Second League
6	Bratslav	16	5	1	10	25	54	−29	16	Admission to Ukrainian Second League
7	Naftovyk Okhtyrka	16	4	1	11	24	38	−14	13	
8	Standart Novi Sanzhary	16	3	0	13	12	19	−7	9	Withdrawn
9	To4ka Odesa	16	2	0	14	11	52	−41	6	Withdrawn after the season

Source: AAFU
Rules for classification: 1) Points; 2) Head-to-head points; 3) Head-to-head wins; 4) Head-to-head goal difference; 5) Head-to-head goals scored; 6) Goal difference; 7) Goals scored; 8) Draw of lots.
(C) Group winner; (Q) Qualification to the final stage

Notes

- The round 5 match Avanhard vs Karbon was decided administratively with Avanhard receiving a win (3:0) and Karbon a loss (0:3).
- The round 8 match Avanhard vs Naftovyk was decided administratively with Avanhard receiving a win (3:0) and Naftovyk a loss (0:3).
- The round 9 match Olympiya vs To4ka was decided administratively with Olympiya receiving a win (3:0) and To4ka a loss (0:3).
- The round 15 match Naftovyk vs Rokyta was forced to be postponed. It was later decided administratively, with Rokyta receiving a win (3:0) and Naftovyk a loss (0:3).
- The round 17 match Naftovyk vs Avanhard could not start and was postponed.

== Final stage ==
The final stage consists of eight teams, the selection of which is determined exclusively by the AAFU Commission in conducting competitions.

=== Teams qualified ===
In parentheses are indicated the number of times the club qualified for this phase.

- Group 1: Ahron Velyki Hayi (4), Dnister Zalishchyky (2), Kormil Yavoriv, FC Mykolaiv (2)
- Group 2: Avanhard Lozova (2), FC Rokyta, Ahrotekh Tyshkivka (3), Olympia Savyntsi (4)

=== Quarterfinals ===
Team 1	Agg.	Team 2	1st leg	2nd leg
First leg – May 30, Second leg – June 6
Olympiya Savyntsi	2 – 2 (1–4 p)	Ahron Velyki Hayi	0–0	2–2 (a.e.t.)
First leg – May 30, Second leg – June 7
Ahrotekh Tyshkivka	3 – 3 (3–2 p)	Dnister Zalishchyky	1–3	2–0 (a.e.t.)
Mykolaiv	4 – 5	Avanhard Lozova	1–3	3–2
First leg – May 31, Second leg – June 7
Kormil Yavoriv	6 – 4	Rokyta	5–1	1–3

30 May 2026	Olympiya Savyntsi	0 – 0	Ahron Velyki Hayi	Myrhorod, Poltava Oblast
11:00		Report	Kryvdik (red card) 90+2'	Stadium: Start; Attendance: 50; Referee: Serhiy Dubykivskyi (Kyiv Oblast)

30 May 2026	Ahrotekh Tyshkivka	1 – 3	Dnister Zalishchyky	Tyshkivka, Kirovohrad Oblast
13:00	Pastukhov 79'	Report	Mykhailenko 6'; Dyachynskyi 35'; Zakharkiv 72'	Stadium: Litsei-Arena; Attendance: n/d Referee: Rostyslav Dubyna (Dnipro)

30 May 2026	FC Mykolaiv	1 – 3	Avanhard Lozova	Mykolaiv, Lviv Oblast
15:00	Koval 81'	Report	Mihunov 29'; Sukhomlyn 46'; Borovyk 76'; Halushka (red card) 80'	Stadium: Miskyi; Attendance: 200; Referee: Vitaliy Malyar (Khmelnytskyi)

31 May 2026	Kormil Yavoriv	5 – 1	FC Rokyta	Yavoriv, Lviv Oblast
13:30	Hladkyi 30' (pen.); Dobryanskyi 46'; Shandra 47'; Ravlyk 75'; Drahan 88'	Report	Hromenko 61'; Ostapenko (yellow card) 33' (yellow-red card) 68'	Stadium: imeni Smuka; Attendance: 200; Referee: Ivan Mandzyuk (Ternopil Oblast)

6 June 2026	Ahron Velyki Hayi	2 – 2 (a.e.t.) (4–1 p)	Olympiya Savyntsi	Velyki Hayi, Ternopil Oblast
12:00	Semenets 56'; Hromyak 80'; Shcherbatyuk (yellow card) 74' (yellow-red card) 88'	Report	Loboda 46'; Fabunmi 90+2'; Reutov (yellow card) 81' (yellow-red card) 104'	Stadium: Tsentralnyi; Attendance: 500; Referee: Artem Hordynskyi (Vinnytsia)
	Penalties
	Hromyak (penalty scored); Bilyk (penalty scored); Skakun (penalty scored); Mostovyi (penalty scored)		(penalty missed) Koshman; (penalty missed) Fabunmi; (penalty scored) Ponomarenko

7 June 2026	Avanhard Lozova	2 – 3	FC Mykolaiv	Yuriivka, Dnipropetrovsk Oblast
12:00	Hladkyi 19'; Sokolan 76'	Report	Zavalyak 48'; Bohdanov 51', 79'	Stadium: DYuSSh; Attendance: n/d Referee: Maksym Polishchuk (Kryvyi Rih)

7 June 2026	FC Rokyta	3 – 1	Kormil Yavoriv	Rokyta, Poltava Oblast
12:00	Myakushko 26'; Darda 49', 57'	Report	Dobryanskyi 37'	Stadium: Arena Rokyta; Attendance: n/d Referee: Mykyta Konovalov (Kyiv)

7 June 2026	Dnister Zalishchyky	0 – 2 (a.e.t.) (2–3 p)	Ahrotekh Tyshkivka	Zalishchyky, Ternopil Oblast
13:00		Report	Kovalenko 59'; Falkovskyi 75'	Stadium: Dnister; Attendance: 250; Referee: Oleh Kuzyk (Lviv)
	Penalties
	Protsyk (penalty missed); Bozhko (penalty scored); Malashchuk (penalty missed); Shyshyhin (penalty scored); Landyak (penalty missed)		(penalty scored) Kovalenko; (penalty scored) Bizhko; (penalty scored) Pastukhov; (penalty missed) Ponomarenko

=== Semifinals ===
Team 1	Agg.	Team 2	1st leg	2nd leg
First leg – June 13, Second leg – June 20
Ahrotekh Tyshkivka	4 – 2	Ahron Velyki Hayi	3–1	1–1
First leg – June 14, Second leg – June 20
Kormil Yavoriv	2 – 2 (4–3 p)	Avanhard Lozova	0–0	2–2 (a.e.t.)

13 June 2026	Ahrotekh Tyshkivka	3 – 1	Ahron Velyki Hayi	Tyshkivka, Kirovohrad Oblast
13:00	Falkovskyi 33'; Pastukhov 68'; Zhadan 77'	Report	Poniedielnik 27'	Stadium: Litsei-Arena; Attendance: 100; Referee: Roman Halitsyn (Sumy)

14 June 2026	Kormil Yavoriv	0 – 0	Avanhard Lozova	Yavoriv, Lviv Oblast
14:00		Report		Stadium: imeni Smuka; Attendance: 800; Referee: Oleksiy Borodavka (Zhytomyr)

20 June 2026	Avanhard Lozova	2 – 2 (a.e.t.) (3 – 4 p)	Kormil Yavoriv	Yuriivka, Dnipropetrovsk Oblast
14:10	Sokolan 59'; Hrebenyuk 85' (pen.)	Report	Ravlyk 27', 72'	Stadium: DYuSSh; Attendance: n/d Referee: Vladyslav Orendochka (Poltava)
	Penalties
	Sukhomlyn (penalty scored); Sokolan (penalty scored); Volovyk (penalty missed); Borovyk (penalty scored); Hrebenyuk (penalty missed)		(penalty scored) Ravlyk; (penalty scored) Dmytryshyn; (penalty missed) Mudryk; (penalty scored) Deda; (penalty scored) Hladkyi

20 June 2026	Ahron Velyki Hayi	1 – 1	Ahrotekh Tyshkivka	Velyki Hayi, Ternopil Oblast
15:00	Poniedielnik 50'; Andriyeshyn (red card) 54'	Report	Zahalskyi 55'	Stadium: Tsentralnyi; Attendance: 500; Referee: Yaroslav Leskiv (Lviv Oblast)

=== Final ===
26 June 2026	Ahrotekh Tyshkivka	1 – 0	Kormil Yavoriv	Kyiv
13:00	Zhadan 59'	Report		Stadium: imeni Bannikova; Attendance: 250; Referee: Vladyslav Hrytsai (Kyiv Oblast)

== Admission to the Second League ==
The amateur teams are allowed to participate in the Ukrainian championship among teams of the 2026–27 Ukrainian Second League under such conditions:

- The team participated in the Ukrainian championship among amateur teams throughout the 2025–26 season and was a participant in the championship play-off stage.
- The club received a license per the Regulation on licensing of football clubs of the Ukrainian Second League.
- The club and its results of participation in the AAFU competitions meet the requirements that are defined in the regulations of the All-Ukrainian competitions in football among clubs' teams of the 2024–25 Professional Football League of Ukraine.

In November of 2025, at least six clubs were interested in joining professional competitions next season: Avanhard (Lozova), Bratslav, Dnister (Zalishchyky), Karbon (Cherkasy), Kormil (Yavoriv), Mykolaiv.

== Number of teams by region ==
Number	Region	Team(s)
3	Poltava Oblast	Olimpiya Savyntsi, Rokyta, Standart Novi Sanzhary
2	Ternopil Oblast	Ahron Velyki Hayi, Dnister Zalishchyky
2	Lviv Oblast	Kormil Yavoriv, Mykolaiv
2	Rivne Oblast	Kostopil, Mayak Sarny
2	Zhytomyr Oblast	Korosten/Ahro-Nyva, Vivad Romaniv
1	Cherkasy Oblast	Karbon Cherkasy
1	Kirovohrad Oblast	Ahrotekh Tyshkivka
1	Kharkiv Oblast	Avanhard Lozova
1	Khmelnytskyi Oblast	Kolos Polonne
1	Odesa Oblast	To4ka Odesa
1	Sumy Oblast	Naftovyk Okhtyrka
1	Vinnytsia Oblast	Bratslav
1	Volyn Oblast	Trostianets

== See also ==
- 2025–26 Ukrainian Second League
- 2025–26 Ukrainian First League
- 2025–26 Ukrainian Premier League
- 2025–26 Ukrainian Amateur Cup
- 2025–26 Ukrainian Premier League Under-19
- 2025–26 Ukrainian Women's First League
- List of Ukrainian football transfers summer 2025
- List of Ukrainian football transfers winter 2025–26
