= 2024–25 Ukrainian Football Amateur League =

Ukrainian Football season

Ukrainian Amateur Football Championship
- Season: 2024-25
- Dates: Group stage: 17 August 2024 – 25 May 2025; Winter break: 10 November 2024 – 5 April 2025; Play-offs: 31 May – 27 June 2025
- Teams: 20
- Final stage winner: Dnister Zalishchyky (1st title) Atlet Kyiv (losing finalist)
- Promoted: 4 – Atlet, Lisne, Rebel, Penuel
- Top goalscorer: Nazar Voloshyn (15)

The 2024–25 Ukrainian football championship among amateur teams was the 29th season since it replaced the football championship of physical culture teams. The league competition is organized by the Association of Amateur Football of Ukraine (AAFU).

== Teams ==
13 teams from last season reapplied for this season, including last season's winner, Ahrotekh Tyshkivka.

=== Returning/reformed clubs ===
- Dnister Zalishchyky – (last played at this level during the Soviet-period 1991 season)

=== Debut ===
List of teams that are debuting this season in the league:

- Halych Zbarazh
- Rebel Kyiv
- Lisne
- Standart Novi Sanzhary
- Mriya Hostomel
- FC Mykolaiv

=== Withdrawn teams ===
List of clubs that took part in last year competition, but chose not to participate in 2024–25 season:

- Maramuresh Nyzhnia Apsha
- Podoliany Ternopil
- Shturm Ivankiv (merged with Kolos Kovalivka)

List of clubs that withdrew during the season or right after it:

- Tytan Odesa (March 30)
- Zirka Kropyvnytskyi (April 16)
- Mriya Hostomel (May 1)

=== Location map ===
The following displays the location of teams.

Location of teams in the 2024-25 Ukrainian Amateur League
Home venues of teams in the 2024–25 Ukrainian Football Amateur League in Kyiv Oblast

=== Stadiums ===
Group A

Team	Pop. place	Stadium	Position in 2023–24
Ahron	Velyki Hayi	(Village Stadium)	Am1, 3rd
Kolos	Polonne	Polon; Veres training field	Am1, 4th
Vivad	Romaniv	Tsentralnyi	Am1, 6th
Feniks	Pidmonastyr	Arena Feniks	Am1, 9th
Sokil	Mykhailivka-Rubezhivka	Shkilnyi	Am1, 10th
Dnister	Zalishchyky	Dnister	Reg
Lisne	Lisne	Buzova Arena, Buzova	Reg
Mykolaiv	Mykolaiv	Miskyi	Reg
Halych	Zbarazh	Kolos	Reg
Mriya	Hostomel	Tsentralnyi; Urban Sport City	Reg

Group B

Team	Pop. place	Stadium	Position in 2023–24
Olimpiya	Savyntsi	Start, Myrhorod	Am2, 1st
Ahrotekh	Tyshkivka	Litsei-Arena	Am2, 2nd
Tytan	Odesa	Shkilnyi, Chornomorsk	Am2, 3rd
Naftovyk	Okhtyrka	(Town Stadium), Novi Sanzhary, Poltava Oblast	Am2, 4th
Atlet	Kyiv	Atlet	Am2, 5th
Zirka	Kropyvnytskyi	Zirka imeni Berezkina	Am3, 6th
Avanhard	Lozova	DYuSSh Stadium, Yuryivka, Dnipropetrovsk Oblast	Am2, 8th
Penuel	Kryvyi Rih	Svitlo; Metalurh	Am2, 9th
Rebel	Kyiv	imeni Brukvenka, Makariv; Shkilnyi, Mykhailivka-Rubezhivka; Zmina	Reg
Standart	Novi Sanzhary	(Town Stadium); Kolos-Arena, Mahdalynivka, Dnipropetrovsk Oblast	Reg

Notes:

- Reg — regional championship (Regions of Ukraine)
- Am[#] — AAFU championship where sign (#) indicates Group number

== Group stage ==
=== Group 1 ===
Pos	Team	Pld	W	D	L	GF	GA	GD	Pts	Promotion, qualification or relegation
1	Lisne (C)	18	13	3	2	62	12	+50	42	Qualification to final stage Admission to Ukrainian Second League
2	Dnister Zalishchyky	18	13	1	4	45	15	+30	40	Qualification to final stage
3	Ahron Velyki Hayi	18	10	4	4	32	20	+12	34	Qualification to final stage
4	Mykolaiv	18	9	3	6	40	29	+11	30	Qualification to final stage
5	Kolos Polonne	18	8	5	5	35	19	+16	29	
6	Sokil Mykhailivka-Rubezhivka	18	8	2	8	23	23	0	26	Withdrawn after the season
7	VIVAD Romaniv	18	7	2	9	28	26	+2	23	
8	Feniks Pidmonastyr	18	4	3	11	20	60	−40	15	Withdrawn after the season
9	Halych Zbarazh	18	4	2	12	18	48	−30	14	Withdrawn after the season
10	Mriya Hostomel (X)	18	1	1	16	8	59	−51	4	Withdrawn

Source: AAFU, Sokil
Rules for classification: 1) Points; 2) Head-to-head points; 3) Head-to-head wins; 4) Head-to-head goal difference; 5) Head-to-head goals scored; 6) Goal difference; 7) Goals scored; 8) Draw of lots.
(C) Champions; (X) Withdrew

=== Group 2 ===
Pos	Team	Pld	W	D	L	GF	GA	GD	Pts	Promotion, qualification or relegation
1	Ahrotekh Tyshkivka (C)	18	12	2	4	44	22	+22	38	Qualification to final stage
2	Atlet Kyiv	18	12	1	5	37	13	+24	37	Qualification to second stage Admission to Ukrainian Second League
3	Avanhard Lozova	18	11	3	4	30	17	+13	36	Qualification to final stage
4	Rebel Kyiv	18	11	2	5	32	15	+17	35	Qualification to second stage Admission to Ukrainian Second League
5	Olympia Savyntsi	18	10	4	4	34	18	+16	34	
6	Naftovyk Okhtyrka	18	7	2	9	22	29	−7	23	
7	Standart Novi Sanzhary	18	6	2	10	18	22	−4	20	
8	Penuel Kryvyi Rih	18	5	3	10	24	34	−10	18	Admission to Ukrainian Second League
9	Tytan Odesa (X)	18	3	2	13	15	40	−25	11	Withdrawn
10	Zirka Kropyvnytskyi (X)	18	2	1	15	10	56	−46	7	Withdrawn

Source: AAFU, Sokil
Rules for classification: 1) Points; 2) Head-to-head points; 3) Head-to-head wins; 4) Head-to-head goal difference; 5) Head-to-head goals scored; 6) Goal difference; 7) Goals scored; 8) Draw of lots.
(C) Champions; (X) Withdrew

== Final stage ==
To the stage qualify eight teams, selection of which is determined exclusively by the AAFU Commission in conducting competitions.

=== Teams qualified ===
In parentheses are indicated the number of times the club qualified for this phase.

- Group 1: Dnister Zalishchyky, Lisne, Ahron Velyki Hayi (3), FC Mykolaiv
- Group 2: Avanhard Lozova, Ahrotekh Tyshkivka (2), Atlet Kyiv, Rebel Kyiv

=== Quarterfinals ===
Games are scheduled for 31 May/1 June and 7/8 June 2024.

Team 1	Agg.	Team 2	1st leg	2nd leg
First leg – May 31, Second leg – June 7
Ahron Velyki Hayi	1 – 4	Atlet Kyiv	1–1	0–3
First leg – June 1, Second leg – June 7
FC Mykolaiv	3 – 5	Ahrotekh Tyshkivka	2–1	1–4 (a.e.t.)
First leg – June 1, Second leg – June 8
Avanhard Lozova	2 – 3	Dnister Zalishchyky	2–1	0–2
Rebel Kyiv	5 – 2	Lisne	3–1	2–1

31 May 2025	Ahron Velyki Hayi	1–1	Atlet Kyiv	Velyki Hayi, Ternopil Oblast
13:00	Melnyk 40'	Report	Teimurov 71'	Stadium: sela Velyki Hayi; Attendance: 50; Referee: Mykola Baidyuk (Chernivtsi)

1 June 2025	Rebel Kyiv	3–1	FC Lisne	Mykhailivka-Rubezhivka, Kyiv Oblast
12:00	Vlasenko 6'; Bohdan 14', 68'	Report	Shestakov 81'	Stadium: Shkilnyi; Referee: Vitaliy Solovyov (Odesa)

1 June 2025	Avanhard Lozova	2–1	Dnister Zalishchyky	Yuryivka, Dnipropetrovsk Oblast
14:00	Borovyk 7'; Mishurenko 20' (pen.); Oliynyk 72' (o.g.)	Report		Stadium: DYuSSh; Referee: Oleksandr Sadovyi (Kremenchuk)

1 June 2025	FC Mykolaiv	2–1	Ahrotekh Tyshkivka	Mykolaiv, Lviv Oblast
14:00	Kachor 45+1'; Krynytskyi 45+3'; Slavetskyi (yellow card) 31' (yellow-red card) 74'	Report	Pastukhov 78'; Bovtunenko (yellow card) 24' (yellow-red card) 83'	Stadium: Miskyi; Attendance: 450; Referee: Ivan Mandzyuk (Ternopil Oblast)

7 June 2025	Atlet Kyiv	3–0	Ahron Velyki Hayi	Kyiv
13:00	Strilets 44'; Tyshchenko 53'; Presych 60'	Report		Stadium: Atlet; Referee: Vladyslav Hrytsai (Kyiv Oblast)

7 June 2025	Ahrotekh Tyshkivka	4–1 (a.e.t.)	FC Mykolaiv	Tyshkivka, Kirovohrad Oblast
13:00	Kryvoshei 20'; Pastukhov 39'; Kulibaba 117'	Report	Luchka 62'; Luchka 120' (o.g.)	Stadium: Litsey Arena; Referee: Andriy Voyevoda (Dnipro)

8 June 2025	Dnister Zalishchyky	2–0	Avanhard Lozova	Zalishchyky, Ternopil Oblast
14:00	Mykhailenko 32', 45+1'	Report		Stadium: Dnister; Attendance: 250; Referee: Mykola Baidyuk (Chernivtsi)

8 June 2025	FC Lisne	1–2	Rebel Kyiv	Makariv, Kyiv Oblast
14:00	Lyha 60'	Report	Bohdan 40'; Andrukhiv 67'; Davydenko (yellow card) 90+2' (yellow-red card) 90+6'	Stadium: imeni Brukvenka; Attendance: 50; Referee: Yevheniy Makarenko (Sumy)

=== Semifinals ===
Games are scheduled for 14/15 and 21 June 2024.

Team 1	Agg.	Team 2	1st leg	2nd leg
First leg – June 14, Second leg – June 21
Atlet Kyiv	5 – 3	Ahrotekh Tyshkivka	3–2	2–1
Rebel Kyiv	1 – 1 (2–4 p)	Dnister Zalishchyky	0–1	1–0 (a.e.t.)

14 June 2025	Atlet Kyiv	3–2	Ahrotekh Tyshkivka	Kyiv
13:00	Lypovyi (red card) 4'; Teymurov 12'; Strilets 26' (pen.); Peresich 32'	Report; Report (Atlet)	Kovalenko 47'; Pastukhov 59'	Stadium: Atlet; Referee: Artem Hordynskyi (Vinnytsia)

14 June 2025	Rebel Kyiv	0–1	Dnister Zalishchyky	Mykhailivka-Rubezhivka, Kyiv Oblast
11:00		Report	Landyak 37'	Stadium: Shkilnyi; Referee: Oleh Olkhovskyi (Luhansk)

21 June 2025	Ahrotekh Tyshkivka	1–2	Atlet Kyiv	Tyshkivka, Kirovohrad Oblast
13:00	Zahalskyi 31'; Sokolan (penalty missed) 60'	Report; Report (Atlet)	Tverezenko 29'; Peresich 86'	Stadium: Litsei Arena; Attendance: 210; Referee: Artem Artemencko (Mykolaiv)

21 June 2025	Dnister Zalishchyky	0–1 (a.e.t.) (4–2 p)	Rebel Kyiv	Zalishchyky, Ternopil Oblast
14:00		Report	Vlasenko 20'; Mazur (penalty missed) 101'	Stadium: Dnister; Attendance: 350; Referee: Oleh Kuzyk (Lviv)
	Penalties
	Mykhailenko (penalty scored); Holodryha (penalty scored); Batsman (penalty scored); Pasichnyk (penalty scored)		(penalty missed) Mazur; (penalty scored) Stavnychyi; (penalty scored) Petrovskyi; (penalty missed) Fedorov

=== Final ===
27 June 2024	Atlet Kyiv	1 – 3 (a.e.t.)	Dnister Zalishchyky	Kyiv
13:00	Babych 16'; Harkusha (red card) 36'	Report	Protsyk 21'; Holodryha 109'; Holodryha (yellow card) 105' (yellow-red card) 109'; Kiriyenko 120+2'	Stadium: imeni Bannikova; Attendance: 150; Referee: Andriy Shevchuk (Volyn Oblast)

=== Top Goalscorers ===
As of 29 October 2025

Rank	Scorer	Team	Goals (Pen.)
1	Nazar Voloshyn	Lisne	15 (0)

== Promotions to the Second League ==
The amateur teams are allowed to participate in the Ukrainian championship among teams of the 2025–26 Ukrainian Second League under such conditions:

- Team participated in the Ukrainian championship among amateur teams throughout the 2024–25 season and was a participant in the championship play-off stage.
- The club received a license per the Regulation on licensing of football clubs of the Ukrainian Second League.
- The club and its results of participation in the AAFU competitions meet the requirements that are defined in the regulations of the All-Ukrainian competitions in football among clubs' teams of the 2023–24 Professional Football League of Ukraine.

In November of 2024, at least six clubs were interested in joining professional competitions next season: Atlet (Kyiv), Rebel (Kyiv), Dnister (Zalishchyky), Feniks (Pidmonastyr), Standart (Novi Sanzhary), Lisne. In May of 2025, it became known that 3-5 teams from the amateur league are expected to get admitted to the Second League next season. Among the contenders were listed Rebel, Lisne, Atlet, Penuel (Kryvyi Rih), and Dnister.

== Number of teams by region ==
Number	Region	Team(s)
3	Kyiv Oblast	Lisne, Mriya Hostomel, Sokil Mykhailivka-Rubezhivka
3	Ternopil Oblast	Ahron Velyki Hayi, Dnister Zalishchyky, Halych Zbarazh
2	Kirovohrad Oblast	Ahrotekh Tyshkivka, Zirka Kropyvnytskyi
2	Kyiv	Atlet, Rebel
2	Lviv Oblast	Mykolaiv, Feniks Pidmonastyr
2	Poltava Oblast	Olimpiya Savyntsi, Standart Novi Sanzhary
1	Dnipropetrovsk Oblast	Penuel Kryvyi Rih
1	Kharkiv Oblast	Avanhard Lozova
1	Khmelnytskyi Oblast	Kolos Polonne
1	Odesa Oblast	Tytan Odesa
1	Sumy Oblast	Naftovyk Okhtyrka
1	Zhytomyr Oblast	Vivad Romaniv

== See also ==
- 2024–25 Ukrainian Second League
- 2024–25 Ukrainian First League
- 2024–25 Ukrainian Premier League
- 2024–25 Ukrainian Amateur Cup
