= 2025–26 Ukrainian Amateur Cup =

2025–26 Ukrainian Cup for amateur teams
Tournament details
- Country: Ukraine
- Dates: 27 August 2025 – 13 May 2026
- Teams: 25

Final positions
- Champions: Avanhard Lozova
- Runners-up: Mayak Sarny
- Ukrainian Cup: Mayak Sarny; Olympiya Savyntsi; Ahrotekh Tyshkivka; FC Rokyta; FC Vilkhivtsi; To4ka Odesa

The 2025–26 Ukrainian Amateur Cup was the 30th season of the national football cup competition for amateur teams, which started on August 27, 2025.

Ahrotekh Tyshkivka were the defending champions that, this season, also competed at the 2025–26 Ukrainian Football Amateur League and the 2025–26 Ukrainian Cup. They were defeated in quarterfinals by Avanhard Lozova 5–6 on aggregate.

== Participated clubs ==
In bold are clubs that were active at the same season AAFU championship (parallel round-robin competition).

- Cherkasy Oblast (1): **Carbon Cherkasy**
- Chernivtsi Oblast (1): Dovbush Chernivtsi
- Dnipropetrovsk Oblast (1): Oril Tsarychanka
- Ivano-Frankivsk Oblast (1): Vilkhivtsi
- Kirovohrad Oblast (1): **Ahrotekh Tyshkivka**
- Kharkiv Oblast (1): **Avanhard Lozova**
- Khmelnytskyi Oblast (1): Adrenalin-DYuSSh-1 Khmelnytskyi
- Kyiv Oblast (1): Sokil Mykhailivka-Rubezhivka
- Lviv Oblast (1): Piatnychany
- Mykolaiv Oblast (1): Mykolaiv 1920
- Odesa Oblast (2): Enerhetyk Teplodar, **To4ka Odesa**
- Poltava Oblast (5): Budivelnyk Kremenchuk, Lubny, **Olimpiya Savyntsi**, **Rokyta**, **Standart Novi Sanzhary** (Note: In mid-summer of 2025, there were some announcements of participation of FC Reshetylivka rather than FC Standart.)
- Rivne Oblast (2): **Mayak Sarny**, **Kostopil**
- Ternopil Oblast (3): Borshchiv, **Dnister Zalishchyky**, Halych Zbarazh
- Volyn Oblast (1): LSTM 536 Lutsk
- Zakarpattia Oblast (1): Medeya-Nevytskyi Zamok Onokivtsi
- Zaporizhia Oblast (1): IRON Zaporizhia

Notes

- Teams that were simultaneously competing in the 2025–26 Ukrainian Cup: Ahrotekh Tyshkivka (AAFU), Avanhard Lozova (AAFU), Iron Zaporizhia, Karbon Cherkasy, LSTM 536 Lutsk, Mayak Sarny (AAFU), Medeya-Nevytskyi Zamok Onokivtsi, Olympiya Savyntsi
- Most of the 2025–26 Ukrainian Football Amateur League participants (seven) received a bye in the first round, proceeding to the round of 16. Those were Avanhard Lozova, Standart Novi Sanzhary, Mayak Sarny, Dnister Zalishchyky, FC Rokyta, Olimpiya Savyntsi, Karbon Cherkasy.

== Bracket ==
The following is the bracket that demonstrates the last four rounds of the Ukrainian Cup, including the final match. Numbers in parentheses next to the match score represent the results of a penalty shoot-out. Numbers in square brackets show the administrative score.

Round of 16
Dnister Zalishchyky	4	5	9
Medeya Nevytskyi Zamok	0	0	0
Halych Zbarazh	2	[0]	2
FC Vilkhivtsi	3	[3]	6
Mayak Sarny	6	1	7
LSTM 536 Lutsk	0	2	2
FC Rokyta	5	4	9
Sokil Mykhailivka-Rubezhivka	2	1	3
To4ka Odesa	2	2	4
Budivelnyk Kremenchuk	2	1	3
Olympiya Savyntsi	5	1	6
Carbon Cherkasy	1	1	2
Avanhard Lozova	5	4	9
Standart Novi Sanzhary	0	3	3
Ahrotekh Tyshkivka	–	–	+
FC Lubny	–	–	-

Quarter-finals
FC Vilkhivtsi	1	0	1
Dnister Zalishchyky	1	4	5
Mayak Sarny	3	3	6
FC Rokyta	1	1	2
Olympiya Savnytsi	7	1	8
To4ka Odesa	0	1	1
Avanhard Lozova	5	1	6
Ahrotekh Tyshkivka	2	3	5

Semi-finals
Mayak Sarny	1	0	1 (4)
Dnister Zalishchyky	0	1	1 (2)
Olympiya Savnytsi	2	2	4
Avanhard Lozova	0	6	6

Final
13 May – Kyiv
Avanhard Lovova	2
Mayak Sarny	0

== Results ==
=== Round of 32 ===
The first leg was played on 27 September. The second leg was played on 3 September.

Team 1	Agg.	Team 2	1st leg	2nd leg
First leg – August 27, Second leg – September 3
Medeya Nevytskyi Zamok	2 – 1	Dovbush Chernivtsi	2–0 (Note: The match took place at Stadion "Avanhard" in Uzhhorod (Onikivtsi is an adjacent village of Uzhhorod).)	0–1
FC Kostopil	1 – 5	LSTM No.536 Lutsk	1–3	0–2
FC Pyatnychany	2 – 3	Halych Zbarazh	0–2	2–1
FC Vilkhivtsi	4 – 3	FC Borshchiv	4–2	0–1
Sokil Mykhailivka Rubezhivka	4 – 2	DYuSSh-1 Khmelnytskyi	1–1	3–1
Budivelnyk Kremenchuk	4 – 4 (4–2 p)	Enerhetyk Teplodar	3–1	1–3 (Note: The match took place at Stadion "Shkilnyi" in Chornomorsk.)
FC Lubny	3 – 1	Oril Tsarychanka	1–0	2–1 (Note: The match took place at a stadium of the gymnasium #21 in Kamianske.)
First leg – August 28, Second leg – September 3
To4ka Odesa	7 – 0	Mykolaiv 1920	4–0 (Note: The match took place at Stadion "Shkilnyi" in Chornomorsk.)	(3–0) (Note: administrative score)
First leg – September 3, Second leg – September 10
Iron Zaporizhia	0 – 9	Ahrotekh Tyshkivka	0–6	(0–3) (Note: administrative score)

=== Round of 16 ===
The first leg was played on 17 September. The second leg was played on 24 September.

Team 1	Agg.	Team 2	1st leg	2nd leg
First leg – September 17, Second leg – September 24
Dnister Zalishchyky	9 – 0	Medeya Nevytskyi Zamok	4–0	5–0 (Note: The match took place at Stadion "Kamelot" in Kamyanytsia, Uzhhorod Raion.)
Halych Zbarazh	2 – 6	FC Vilkhivtsi	2–3	(0–3) (Note: administrative score)
Mayak Sarny	7 – 2	LSTM No.536 Lutsk	6–0	1–2
FC Rokyta	9 – 3	Sokil Mykhailivka-Rubezhivka	5–2	4–1
To4ka Odesa	4 – 3	Budivelnyk Kremenchuk	2–2 (Note: The match took place at Stadion "Shkilnyi" in Chornomorsk.)	2–1
Avanhard Lozova	9 – 3	Standart Novi Sanzhary	5–0	4–3 (Note: The match took place at Stadion "Kolos" in Mahdalynivka, Samar Raion.)
First leg – September 17, Second leg – October 1
Olimpiya Savyntsi	6 – 2	Carbon Cherkasy	5–1 (Note: The match took place at Stadion "Start" in Myrhorod.)	1–1 (Note: The match took place at Stadion "Zorya" in Bilozirya, Cherkasy Raion.)
First leg – October 1, Second leg – October 8
Ahrotekh Tyshkivka	w/o	FC Lubny	–	–

- Halych Zbarazh withdrew on 23 September 2025, while FC Lubny withdrew on 30 September 2025. FC Lubny forfeited both its legs against Ahrotekh Tyshkivka.

=== Quarter-finals ===
The first leg was played on 8 October. The second leg was played on 15 October.

Team 1	Agg.	Team 2	1st leg	2nd leg
First leg – October 8, Second leg – October 15
FC Vilkhivtsi	1 – 5	Dnister Zalishchyky	1–1	0–4
Mayak Sarny	6 – 2	FC Rokyta	3–1	3–1
Olimpiya Savyntsi	8 – 1	To4ka Odesa	7–0 (Note: The match took place at Stadion "Start" in Myrhorod.)	1–1 (Note: The match took place at Stadion "Shkilnyi" in Chornomorsk.)
First leg – October 15, Second leg – October 22
Avanhard Lozova	6 – 5	Ahrotekh Tyshkivka	5–2 (Note: The match took place at Stadion DYuSSh in Yuryivka.)	1–3

=== Semi-finals ===
The first leg is scheduled on 22 April. The second leg is scheduled on 29 April.

Team 1	Agg.	Team 2	1st leg	2nd leg
First leg – April 22, Second leg – April 29
Mayak Sarny	1 – 1 (4–2 p)	Dnister Zalishchyky	1–0	0–1
Olimpiya Savyntsi	4 – 6	Avanhard Lozova	2–0 (Note: The match took place at Stadion "Start" in Myrhorod.)	2–6 (Note: The match took place at the DYuSSh Stadium in Yuryivka.)

=== Final ===
The match was scheduled to take place on 13 May 2026 at the Stadion imeni Bannikova in Kyiv.

Team 1	Score	Team 2
Avanhard Lozova	2 – 0	Mayak Sarny

Winner of the 2025–26 Ukrainian Football Cup among amateur teams
Kharkiv Oblast
Avanhard Lozova (Kharkiv Oblast); 1st time

== See also ==
- 2025–26 Ukrainian Cup
- 2025–26 Ukrainian Premier League
- 2025–26 Ukrainian First League
- 2025–26 Ukrainian Second League
- 2025–26 Ukrainian Football Amateur League
- 2025–26 Ukrainian Premier League Under-19
- 2025–26 Ukrainian Women's Top League
- List of Ukrainian football transfers summer 2025
- List of Ukrainian football transfers winter 2025–26
