= Vladyslav Voytsekhovskyi =

Ukrainian footballer

Personal information
- Full name: Vladyslav Pavlovych Voytsekhovskyi
- Date of birth: 19 April 1993 (age 33)
- Place of birth: Mykhailivka-Rubezhivka, Ukraine
- Height: 1.78 m (5 ft 10 in)
- Position: Striker

Team information
- Current team: Vorskla Poltava
- Number: 7

Youth career
- 2006–2007: Youth Sportive School #15 Kyiv
- 2007–2008: KSDYuShOR Kyiv
- 2008–2009: Youth Sportive School #15 Kyiv
- 2009–2010: Atlet Kyiv

Senior career*
Years	Team	Apps	(Gls)
2011–2014	Dnipro Dnipropetrovsk	0	(0)
2014–2017	Naftovyk-Ukrnafta Okhtyrka	79	(16)
2017–2018	Dnipro-1	35	(12)
2019–2021	Mykolaiv	55	(13)
2021–2022	LNZ Cherkasy	17	(1)
2023–2025	Livyi Bereh Kyiv	44	(6)
2025–26	Vorskla Poltava	28	(3)
2026-	FC UCSA Tarasivka	0	(0)
- * Club domestic league appearances and goals as of 4/11/26 @ 14:42PM

Vladyslav Pavlovych Voytsekhovskyi (Ukrainian: Владислав Павлович Войцеховський; born 19 April 1993) is a Ukrainian professional footballer who plays as a striker for Vorskla Poltava.

== Career ==
Voytsekhovskyi is a product of the several Kyivan youth academies. His first trainer was Dmytro Makukha.

In 2011, he signed a contract with the Ukrainian Premier League club Dnipro Dnipropetrovsk, but never played in a senior match. In July 2014 he signed a contract with Naftovyk-Ukrnafta Okhtyrka in the Ukrainian First League.
