= Serhiy Chenbay =

Ukrainian footballer

Personal information
- Full name: Serhiy Dmytrovych Chenbay
- Date of birth: 6 November 1992 (age 34)
- Place of birth: Kyiv, Ukraine
- Height: 1.83 m (6 ft 0 in)
- Position: Midfielder

Team information
- Current team: Atlet Kyiv
- Number: 21

Youth career
- 2006–2010: Atlet Kyiv

Senior career*
Years	Team	Apps	(Gls)
2012–2013	Vorskla Poltava	3	(0)
2013–2016	Kremin Kremenchuk	65	(9)
2016–2017	Hirnyk-Sport Komsomolsk	20	(1)
2017–2019	Kremin Kremenchuk	74	(0)
2020–2022	Metalist 1925 Kharkiv	41	(0)
2022–2024	Inhulets Petrove	28	(0)
2024–	Atlet Kyiv	36	(0)
- * Club domestic league appearances and goals as of 4 June 2026

Serhiy Dmytrovych Chenbay (Ukrainian: Сергій Дмитрович Ченбай, born 6 November 1992) is a Ukrainian professional footballer who plays as a midfielder for Atlet Kyiv in the Ukrainian Second League.

== Career ==
He is a product of the Atlet Kyiv academy.

In February 2012 signed a one-year contract with FC Vorskla Poltava. He made his debut in the Ukrainian Premier League against Metalist Kharkiv on 10 May 2012.
