= Olavale Fabunmi =

Ukrainian footballer

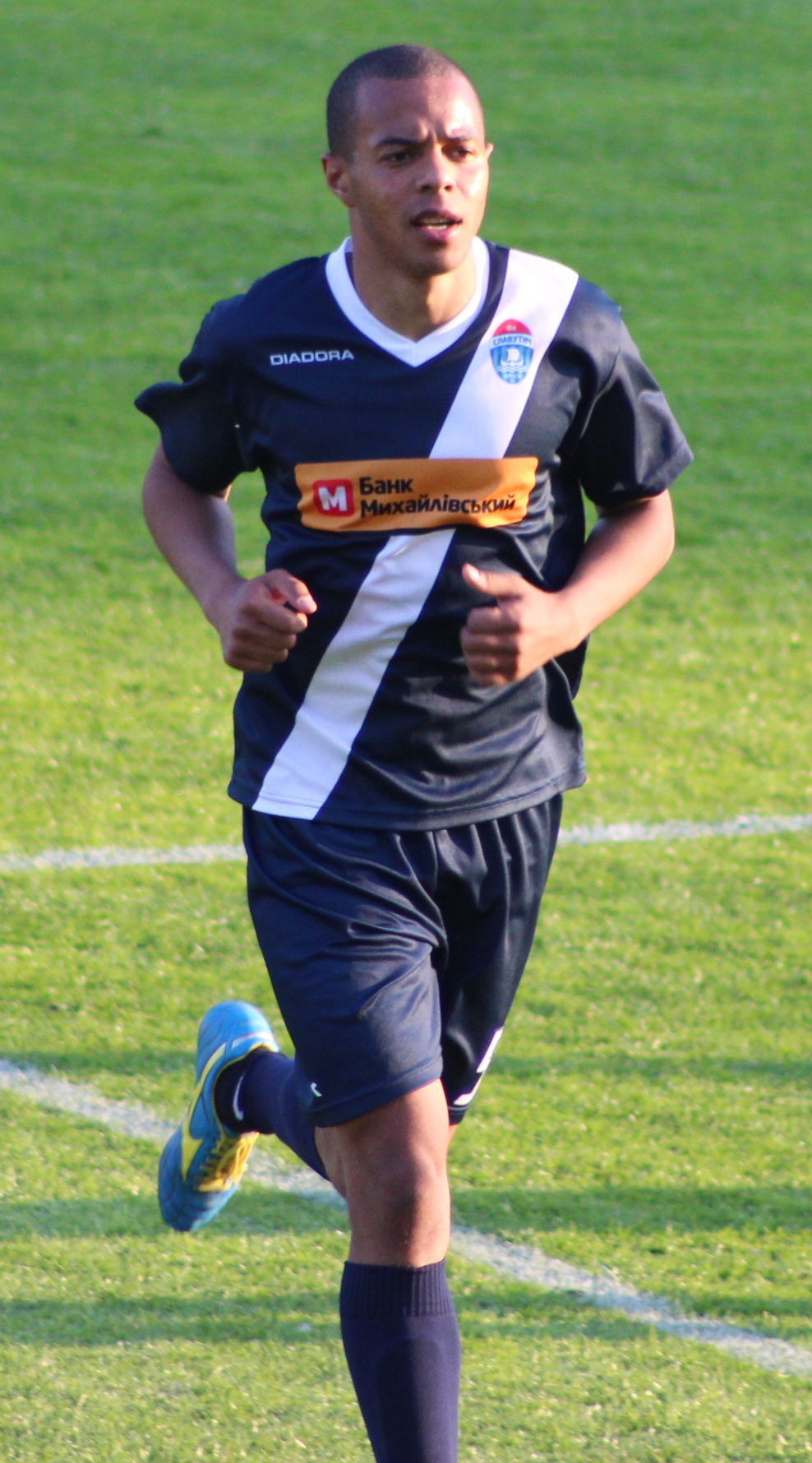

Personal information
- Full name: Olavale Olaytanovych Fabunmi
- Date of birth: 18 January 1992 (age 34)
- Place of birth: Kyiv, Ukraine
- Height: 1.87 m (6 ft 2 in)
- Positions: Wide midfielder; left midfielder

Team information
- Current team: Olimpiya Savyntsi
- Number: 11

Youth career
- 2003: Olimp Kyiv
- 2004–2006: Atlet Kyiv
- 2007: Vidradnyi Kyiv
- 2007–2009: Arsenal Kyiv

Senior career*
Years	Team	Apps	(Gls)
2009–2013	Arsenal Kyiv	0	(0)
2012	→ Slavutych Cherkasy (loan)	20	(2)
2014	Slavutych Cherkasy	13	(0)
2015	Chaika Petropavlivska Borshchahivka	19	(2)
2016–	Olimpiya Savyntsi	133	(33)
- * Club domestic league appearances and goals as of 31 December 2023

Olavale Olaytanovych Fabunmi (Ukrainian: Олавале Олайтанович Фабунмі; born 18 January 1992) is a Ukrainian professional footballer who plays as a wide midfielder or left midfielder for Olimpiya Savyntsi.

== Career ==
Fabunmi is a product of FC Vidradnyi and FC Arsenal Sportive Schools in Kyiv.

He played half-year on loan for FC Slavutych Cherkasy in the Ukrainian Second League in 2012.
