= 2025–26 Ukrainian Premier League Under-19 =

Ukrainian Premier League Under-19
- Season: 2025–26
- Champions: Shakhtar Donetsk
- Relegated: Poltava; Oleksandriya
- UEFA Youth League: Shakhtar Donetsk
- Top goalscorer: Muhamadou Kanteh (28 goals)

The 2025–26 Ukrainian National League Under-19 season is the 14th season of competition between the youth teams of the Ukrainian Premier League. Starting from this season, the youth competitions in the UPL were rebranded as the National League U-19. Dynamo Kyiv under-19 team is the defending champion.

== Teams ==
Entering	Leaving
Epitsentr Kamianets-Podilskyi; Metalist 1925 Kharkiv; Kudrivka; Poltava	Chornomorets Odesa; Vorskla Poltava; Inhulets Petrove; Livyi Bereh Kyiv

=== Stadiums ===
Rank	Stadium	Place	Club	Capacity	Notes
1	Kolos	Boryspil, Kyiv Oblast	Metalist 1925 Kharkiv	5,654	
2	SKIF	Lviv	Karpaty Lviv	4,033	
3	Kremin-Arena	Kremenchuk, Poltava Oblast	Poltava	1,566	
4	OC imeni Piddubnoho	Kyiv	Zorya Luhansk	1,500	
5	Sokil	Lviv	Epitsentr Kamianets-Podilskyi	1,000	
5	Knyazha-Arena	Shchaslyve, Kyiv Oblast	Metalist 1925 Kharkiv	1,000	extra
7	imeni Bohdana Markevycha	Vynnyky, Lviv	Rukh Lviv	900	
7	imeni Bohdana Markevycha	Vynnyky, Lviv	Karpaty Lviv	900	extra
8	Dynamo training base	Kyiv	Dynamo Kyiv Kudrivka	750	
9	Svyatoshyn training base	Kyiv	Shakhtar Donetsk	500	
9	Nika-plyus	Oleksandriya, Kirovohrad Oblast	FC Oleksandriya	500	
11	FC LNZ training base	Heronymivka, Cherkasy Oblast	LNZ Cherkasy	300	
12	Polissya training center	Hlybochytsia, Zhytomyr Oblast	Polissya Zhytomyr	266	
13	Buzova Arena	Buzova, Kyiv Oblast	Kudrivka	253	
14	Kolos training base	Sofiivska Borshchahivka, Kyiv Oblast	Kolos Kovalivka	250	
15	Veres training base	Rivne	Veres Rivne	200	
16	Obolon training base	Bucha, Kyiv Oblast	Obolon Kyiv	150	
17	Hirnyk training base	Kryvyi Rih, Dnipropetrovsk Oblast	Kryvbas Kryvyi Rih	108	

== League table ==
Pos	Team	Pld	W	D	L	GF	GA	GD	Pts	Qualification or relegation
1	Shakhtar Donetsk (C)	30	26	1	3	99	28	+71	79	Qualification to Domestic Champions path
2	Dynamo Kyiv	30	23	7	0	87	17	+70	76	
3	Veres Rivne	30	16	8	6	56	30	+26	56	
4	Rukh Lviv	30	17	3	10	72	41	+31	54	
5	Polissia Zhytomyr	30	15	9	6	39	24	+15	54	
6	Zorya Luhansk	30	15	4	11	29	32	−3	49	
7	Metalist 1925 Kharkiv	30	13	5	12	44	42	+2	44	
8	Kolos Kovalivka	30	13	5	12	50	37	+13	44	
9	LNZ Cherkasy	30	11	10	9	48	46	+2	43	
10	Obolon Kyiv	30	11	8	11	32	46	−14	41	
11	Karpaty Lviv	30	12	3	15	54	57	−3	39	
12	Kryvbas Kryvyi Rih	30	9	5	16	42	59	−17	32	
13	Oleksandriya	30	8	2	20	35	62	−27	26	
14	Kudrivka	30	5	3	22	22	84	−62	18	
15	Epitsentr Kamianets-Podilskyi	30	3	5	22	27	77	−50	14	
16	Poltava	30	3	2	25	20	74	−54	11	Relegated

Source: Ukrainian Premier League website
Rules for classification: 1) Points; 2) Head-to-head points; 3) Head-to-head goal difference; 4) Head-to-head higher number of goals scored; 5) Goal difference; 6) Higher number of goals scored; 7) Draw or "Golden match" if two teams tied for title (Article 22, paragraph 3).
(C) Champions

=== Top scorers ===
Scorer	Team	Goals (Pen.)
(The Gambia) Muhamadou Kanteh	Shakhtar Donetsk	28 (3)
(Ukraine) Ivan Denysov	Rukh Lviv	16 (1)
(Ukraine) Pavlo Lyusin	Dynamo Kyiv	15 (1)
(Ukraine) Dmytro Murashko	Veres Rivne	15 (2)
(Ukraine) Dmytro Sebro	Rukh Lviv	13 (1)

Source: Ukrainian Premier League website

== See also ==
- 2025–26 Ukrainian Cup
- 2025–26 Ukrainian Second League
- 2025–26 Ukrainian First League
- 2025–26 Ukrainian Premier League
- 2025–26 Ukrainian Amateur Cup
- 2025–26 Ukrainian Football Amateur League
- 2025–26 Ukrainian Women's Top League
- List of Ukrainian football transfers summer 2025
- List of Ukrainian football transfers winter 2025–26
