= Andriy Malashchuk =

Ukrainian footballer

Personal information
- Full name: Andriy Oleksandrovych Malashchuk
- Date of birth: 15 February 1999 (age 27)
- Place of birth: Pidvolochysk, Ukraine
- Height: 1.70 m (5 ft 7 in)
- Position: Central midfielder

Team information
- Current team: Dnister Zalishchyky

Youth career
- 2012–2013: Ternopil
- 2013–2014: DYuSSh-Pidvolochysk
- 2014–2016: Ternopil

Senior career*
Years	Team	Apps	(Gls)
2016	Zbruch-Ahrobiznes Pidvolochysk	2	(0)
2016–2017	Ahrobiznes Volochysk	22	(8)
2018–2019	Zbruch-Ahrobiznes Pidvolochysk	26	(4)
2019–2023	Nyva Ternopil	76	(0)
- * Club domestic league appearances and goals as of 27 March 2025

Andriy Oleksandrovych Malashchuk (Ukrainian: Андрій Олександрович Малащук; born 15 February 1999) is a Ukrainian professional footballer who plays as a central midfielder for Ukrainian club Dnister Zalishchyky.
