= 2024–25 Ukrainian Amateur Cup =

2024–25 Ukrainian Cup for amateur teams
Tournament details
- Country: Ukraine
- Dates: 4 September 2024 – 7 May 2025
- Teams: 25

Final positions
- Champions: Ahrotekh Tyshkivka
- Runners-up: Mayak Sarny
- Ukrainian Cup: Mayak Sarny; Avanhard Lozova; Ahrotekh Tyshkivka; Kormil Yavoriv; Denhoff Denykhivka

The 2024–25 Ukrainian Amateur Cup was the 29th season of the national football cup competition for amateur teams, which started on September 4, 2024.

Starting from this season, there was discontinued the old away goal rule. Also, the final stage is expected to consist of a single match rather than the home-away legs as it was traditionally.

The defending champions FC Mykolaiv chose not to compete instead competed at the 2024–25 Ukrainian Cup.

== Participated clubs ==
In bold are clubs that were active at the same season AAFU championship (parallel round-robin competition).

- Cherkasy Oblast (1): Karbon Cherkasy
- Dnipropetrovsk Oblast (2): OKKO Dnipro, **Penuel Kryvyi Rih**
- Ivano-Frankivsk Oblast (2): Blago-Yunist Ivano-Frankivsk, Vilkhivtsi
- Kharkiv Oblast (1): **Avanhard Lozova**
- Kirovohrad Oblast (2): **Ahrotekh Tyshkivka**, **Zirka Kropyvnytskyi**
- Kyiv Oblast (3): Denhoff Denykhivka, **Lisne**, **Sokil Mykhailivka-Rubezhivka**
- Kyiv (2): **Atlet**, **Rebel**
- Lviv Oblast (2): Kormil Yavoriv, Piatnychany
- Poltava Oblast (4): Kolos Velyki Sorochyntsi, **Olimpiya Savyntsi**, Rokyta, **Standart Novi Sanzhary**
- Rivne Oblast (2): Mayak Sarny, Kostopil
- Volyn Oblast (2): LSTM 536 Lutsk, Trostianets
- Zakarpattia Oblast (1): Sevlyush Vynohradiv
- Zhytomyr Oblast (1): Ahro-Nyva Narodychi/Lasky

Notes

- Olimpiya Savyntsi were simultaneously competing at the 2024–25 Ukrainian Cup.

== Bracket ==
The following is the bracket that demonstrates the last four rounds of the Ukrainian Cup, including the final match. Numbers in parentheses next to the match score represent the results of a penalty shoot-out.

Round of 16
FC Lisne | 2 | 1 | **3**
**Mayak Sarny** (a.e.t.) | 0 | 4 | **4**
**FC Vilkhivtsi** | 2 | 3 | **5**
FC Pyatnychany | 2 | 0 | **2**
LSTM 536 Lutsk | 0 | 0 | **0**
**Kormil Yavoriv** | 1 | 1 | **2**
Sokil Mykhailivka-Rubezhivka | 1 | 1 | **2**
**Atlet Kyiv** | 2 | 1 | **3**
Olimpiya Savyntsi | 0 | 4 | **4**
**Avanhard Lozova** (a.e.t.) | 1 | 4 | **5**
**Denhoff Denykhivka** | 3 | 2 | **5**
Rebel Kyiv | 2 | 2 | **4**
FC Rokyta | 1 | 1 | **2**
**Ahrotekh Tyshkivka** | 3 | 2 | **5**
Standart Novi Sanzhary | 5 | 2 | **7**
**Zirka Kropyvnytskyi** | 0 | 1 | **1**

Quarter-finals
**Mayak Sarny** | 1 | 3 | **4**
FC Vilkhivtsi | 1 | 2 | **3**
**Kormil Yavoriv** | 1 | 2 | **3**
Atlet Kyiv | 1 | 0 | **1**
Avanhard Lozova | 1 | 1 | **2**
**Denhoff Denykhivka** | 2 | 1 | **3**
**Ahrotekh Tyshkivka** | 1 | 5 | **6**
Zirka Kropyvnytskyi | 1 | 1 | **2**

Semi-finals
Kormil Yavoriv | 0 | 1 | **1**
**Mayak Sarny** | 1 | 1 | **2**
Denhoff Denykhivka | 1 | 0 | **1**
**Ahrotekh Tyshkivka** | 0 | 3 | **3**

Final
7 May – Kyiv
**Ahrotekh Tyshkivka** | **1**
Mayak Sarny | **0**

== Results ==
=== Round of 32 ===
Many first leg matches were played on 4 September. Second leg is scheduled on 11 September.

| Team 1 | Agg. | Team 2 | 1st leg | 2nd leg |
First leg – September 4, Second leg – September 11
| Sevlyush Vynohradiv | 4 – 6 | **FC Vilkhivtsi** | 2–2 | 2–4 (a.e.t.) |
| **Mayak Sarny** | 4 – 2 | FC Trostianets | 1–0 | 3–2 (a.e.t.) |
| Karbon Cherkasy | 2 – 3 | **Standart Novi Sanzhary** | 0–1 (Note: The match took place at LNZ Arena in Lebedyn.) | 2–2 (Note: The match took place at Kolos Arena in Mahdalynivka.) |
| Kolos Velyki Sorochyntsi | 3 – 5 | **Denhoff Denykhivka** | 1–2 | 2–3 |
| Blago-Yunist Ivano-Frankivsk | 0 – 2 | **Kormil Yavoriv** | 0–1 | 0–1 (Note: The match took place at Miskyi stadion in Mykolaiv.) |
| **LSTM 536 Lutsk** | 3 – 1 | FC Kostopil | 1–0 | 2–1 |
| Ahro-Nyva Narodychi/Lasky | 2 – 8 | **Rebel Kyiv** | 1–6 (Note: The match took place at Kolos Stadium in Putylovychi.) | 1–2 (Note: The match took place at Stadion imeni Brukvenka in Makariv.) |
First leg – September 4, Second leg – September 18
| **FC Rokyta** | 5 – 2 | Penuel Kryvyi Rih | 2–1 | 3–1 |
First leg – September 11, Second leg – September 18
| OKKO Dnipro | dnp (Note: The match between Okko (Dnipro) and FC Pyatnychany did not take place due to the illness of a number of players from one of the teams. According to the decision of the AAFU competition committee, taking into account the mass effect of the disease and the impossibility of clearly establishing the recovery period, FC Pyatnychany qualified for the 1/8 finals.) | **FC Pyatnychany** | | |

=== Round of 16 ===
First leg matches were played on 25 September. Second leg is scheduled on 2 October.

| Team 1 | Agg. | Team 2 | 1st leg | 2nd leg |
First leg – September 25, Second leg – October 2
| FC Rokyta | 2 – 5 | **Ahrotekh Tyshkivka** | 1–3 | 1–2 |
| FC Lisne | 3 – 4 | **Mayak Sarny** | 2–0 (Note: The match took place at Stadion imeni Brukvenka in Makariv.) | 1–4 (a.e.t.) |
| Olimpiya Savyntsi | 4 – 5 | **Avanhard Lozova** | 0–1 | 4–4 (Note: The match took place at Stadion DYuSSh in Yuryivka.)(a.e.t.) |
| Standart Novi Sanzhary | 7 – 1 (Note: Standart Novi Sanzhary were excluded from competition because the club used ineligible player against Zirka Kropyvnytskyi. Zirka Kropyvnytskyi received walkover.) | **Zirka Kropyvnytskyi** | 5–0 (Note: The match took place at Kolos-Arena in Mahdalynivka.) | 2–1 |
| LSTM 536 Lutsk | 0 – 2 (Note: the pair LSTM–Kormil legs were reversed from the original draw.) | **Kormil Yavoriv** | 0–1 | 0–1 |
| **FC Vilkhivtsi** | 5 – 2 | FC Pyatnychany | 2–2 | 3–0 |
| Sokil Mykhailivka-Rubezhivka | 2 – 3 | **Atlet Kyiv** | 1–2 | 1–1 |
First leg – October 2, Second leg – October 9
| **Denhoff Denykhivka** | 5 – 4 | Rebel Kyiv | 3–2 | 2–2 |

=== Quarterfinals ===
First leg games were played on 16 October second leg games on 23 October.

| Team 1 | Agg. | Team 2 | 1st leg | 2nd leg |
First leg – October 16, Second leg – October 23
| Avanhard Lozova | 2 – 3 | **Denhoff Denykhivka** | 1–2 (Note: The match took place at Stadion DYuSSh in Yuryivka.) | 1–1 |
| **Mayak Sarny** | 4 – 3 | FC Vilkhivtsi | 1–1 | 3–2 |
| **Ahrotekh Tyshkivka** | 6 – 2 | Zirka Kropyvnytskyi | 1–1 | 5–1 |
First leg – October 23, Second leg – October 30
| **Kormil Yavoriv** | 3 – 1 | Atlet Kyiv | 1–1 | 2–0 |

=== Semifinals ===
| Team 1 | Agg. | Team 2 | 1st leg | 2nd leg |
First leg – April 23, Second leg – April 30
| Kormil Yavoriv | 1 – 2 | **Mayak Sarny** | 0–1 | 1–1 |
| Denhoff Denykhivka | 1 – 3 | **Ahrotekh Tyshkivka** | 1–0 | 0–3 |

=== Final ===
The final match is planned to take place on 7 May 2025 at Stadion imeni Bannikova in Kyiv.

| Team 1 | Score | Team 2 |
May 7
| **Ahrotekh Tyshkivka** | 1 – 0 | Mayak Sarny |

Winner of the 2024–25 Ukrainian Football Cup among amateur teams
| No emblem of Ahrotekh is available | Kirovohrad Oblast |
**Ahrotekh Tyshkivka (Kirovohrad Oblast)**; **1st time**

== See also ==
- 2024–25 Ukrainian Football Amateur League
- 2024–25 Ukrainian Cup
