= Ruslan Barylyak =

Ukrainian footballer

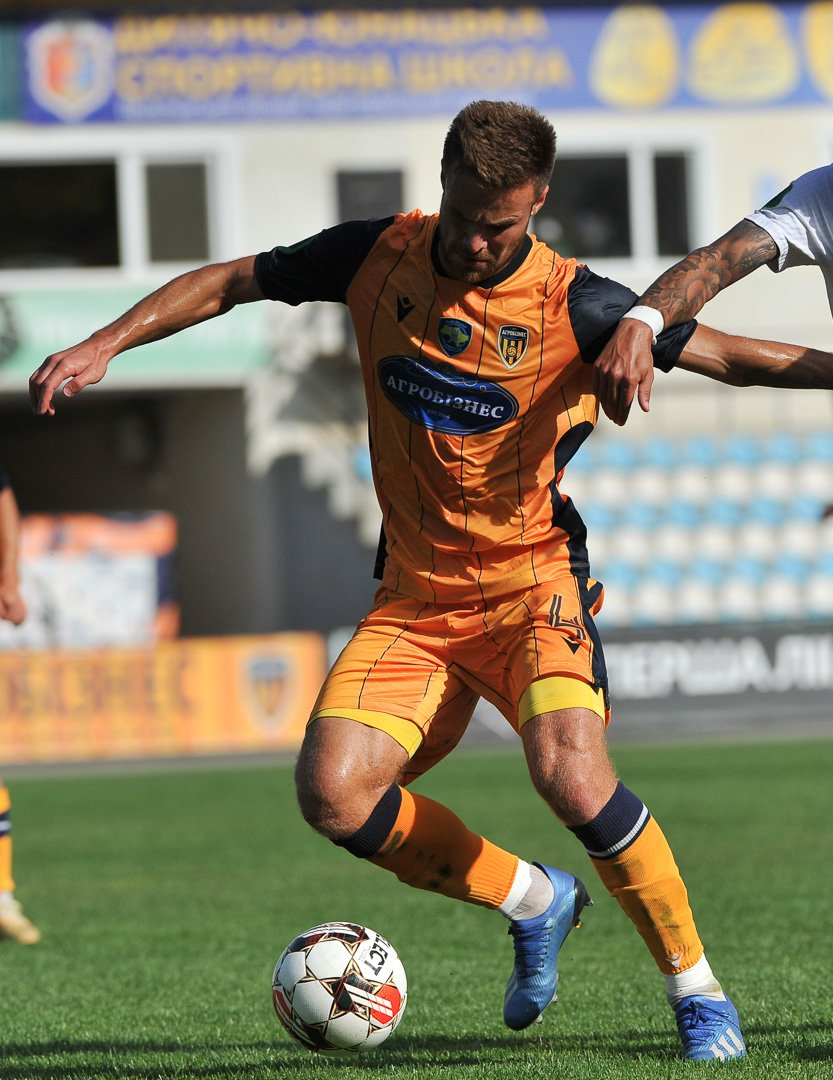

Personal information
- Full name: Ruslan Mykhaylovych Barylyak
- Date of birth: 28 March 1998 (age 28)
- Place of birth: Komarno, Ukraine
- Height: 1.84 m (6 ft 0 in)
- Position: Defender

Team information
- Current team: Ahrobiznes Volochysk
- Number: 4

Youth career
- 2012–2014: Hazovyk-Khurtovyna Komarno
- 2014–2015: Lviv

Senior career*
Years	Team	Apps	(Gls)
2015–2016	Oleksandriya	0	(0)
2016–2018	Lviv	42	(2)
2020–2023	Feniks Pidmonastyr		
2023–	Ahrobiznes Volochysk	22	(1)
- * Club domestic league appearances and goals as of 10 June 2025

Ruslan Mykhaylovych Barylyak (Ukrainian: Руслан Михайлович Бариляк; born 28 March 1998) is a Ukrainian professional football defender who plays for Ahrobiznes Volochysk.

== Career ==
Barylyak is a product of the Hazovyk-Khurtovyna Komarno and FC Lviv Youth Sportive School systems.

He spent his career as a player for Oleksandriya in the Ukrainian Premier League Reserves and after for Lviv in the Ukrainian Second League.
