= Denys Shvydenko =

Ukrainian footballer

Personal information
- Full name: Denys Dmytrovych Shvydenko
- Date of birth: 22 April 2002 (age 24)
- Place of birth: Chervona Sloboda, Cherkasy Oblast, Ukraine
- Height: 1.77 m (5 ft 10 in)
- Position: Right-back

Team information
- Current team: Dnipro-1

Youth career
- 2013–2015: SDYuSShOR Cherkasy
- 2015–2016: Dynamo Kyiv
- 2016: Dnipro-80 Cherkasy
- 2016–2017: SDYuSShOR Uzhhorod
- 2018–2019: Dnipro

Senior career*
Years	Team	Apps	(Gls)
2018	Sloboda Chervona Sloboda		
2019–	Dnipro-1	0	(0)
2021–2022	→ Nikopol (loan)	7	(0)
- * Club domestic league appearances and goals as of 22 July 2022

Denys Dmytrovych Shvydenko (Ukrainian: Денис Дмитрович Швиденко; born 22 April 2002) is a Ukrainian professional footballer who plays as a right-back for Dnipro-1.
