= Vladyslav Sydorenko =

Ukrainian footballer

Personal information
- Full name: Vladyslav Romanovych Sydorenko
- Date of birth: 24 October 1997 (age 29)
- Place of birth: Derhachi, Ukraine
- Height: 1.74 m (5 ft 9 in)
- Position: Right-back

Team information
- Current team: Feniks-Mariupol
- Number: 33

Youth career
- 2010–2014: Metalist Kharkiv

Senior career*
Years	Team	Apps	(Gls)
2014–2016	Metalist Kharkiv	0	(0)
2016	Enerhetyk Solonytsivka	9	(3)
2017–2018	Vorskla Poltava	0	(0)
2018–2019	Kremin Kremenchuk	44	(2)
2020	Balkany Zorya	12	(0)
2021	Kremin Kremenchuk	17	(0)
2022	Prykarpattia Ivano-Frankivsk	0	(0)
2022–2025	Inhulets Petrove	37	(0)
2025–	Feniks-Mariupol	38	(6)
- * Club domestic league appearances and goals as of 4 June 2026

Vladyslav Romanovych Sydorenko (Ukrainian: Владислав Романович Сидоренко; born 24 October 1997) is a Ukrainian professional footballer who plays as a right-back for Ukrainian club Feniks-Mariupol.
