= Yuriivka =

Yuriivka (Ukrainian: Юріївка) or Yurivka (Ukrainian: Юр'ївка) is a common name for a Ukrainian locality:

== Raion and hromada ==
In Dnipropetrovsk Oblast:

- Yurivka Raion, a former raion
- Yuriivka settlement hromada

== Settlements ==
- Yuriivka, Dnipropetrovsk Oblast, a rural settlement in Dnipropetrovsk Oblast
- Yuriivka, Luhansk Oblast, a rural settlement in Luhansk Oblast

== Villages ==
- Yuriivka, Mariupol Raion, Donetsk Oblast
- Yuriivka, Bakhmut Raion, Donetsk Oblast
