= FC Ahrotekh Tyshkivka =

Ukrainian football club

Ahrotekh
- Full name: FC Ahrotekh
- Founded: 2010
- Ground: Litsey Arena
- Capacity: 400
- Chairman: Serhiy Saus
- Manager: Oleksandr Myzenko
- League: Ukrainian Football Amateur League
- 2024–25: Ukrainian Football Amateur League 1st of Group 1 (Semifinal)

Football club Ahrotekh (Ukrainian: Футбольний клуб «Агротех») is an amateur Ukrainian football club from Tyshkivka, Kirovohrad Oblast. The club plays home games at the local stadium, "Litsey Arena" (Lyceum Arena), which belongs to the village school.

== History ==
The club was established in 2010. In the mid-2020s the club became dominant at Ukrainian amateur football, winning a championship (2023–24 season) and cup competitions (2024–25 season).

There are conflicting claims of Ahrotekh winning regional competitions.

== Players ==
=== Current squad ===
As of 1 May 2026 Note: Flags indicate national team as defined under FIFA eligibility rules; some limited exceptions apply. Players may hold more than one non-FIFA nationality.

No.	Pos.	Nation	Player
4	DF	UKR	Dmytro Khorolskyi
5	MF	UKR	Yegor Kryvoshey
6	DF	UKR	Oleksandr Spivak
7	MF	UKR	Denys Radchenko
8	DF	UKR	Hlib Savchuk
9	MF	UKR	Roman Ponomarenko
10	MF	UKR	Oleh Kolomiets
11	FW	UKR	Yevgeny Sokolov
14	DF	UKR	Maksym Bondar
16	MF	UKR	Ihor Zahalskyi
17	DF	UKR	Pavlo Bovtunenko
19	MF	UKR	Volodymyr Bizhko

No.	Pos.	Nation	Player
20	MF	UKR	Nikita Martsenyuk
21	MF	UKR	Pavlo Pastukhov
22	GK	UKR	Oleksandr Kozynets
35	FW	UKR	Oleksandr Zhadan
55	DF	UKR	Maksym Kovalyov
63	GK	UKR	Dmytro Rudyk
69	MF	UKR	Oleh Manastyrnyi
77	FW	UKR	Oleksiy Chychykov
80	MF	UKR	Mykhaylo Syvak
90	MF	UKR	Illya Kovalenko
99	FW	UKR	Maksym Surzhenko
—	MF	UKR	Dmytro Korkishko

=== Out on loan ===
Note: Flags indicate national team as defined under FIFA eligibility rules; some limited exceptions apply. Players may hold more than one non-FIFA nationality.

No. / Pos. / Nation / Player	No. / Pos. / Nation / Player

=== Other players under contract ===
Note: Flags indicate national team as defined under FIFA eligibility rules; some limited exceptions apply. Players may hold more than one non-FIFA nationality.

No. / Pos. / Nation / Player	No. / Pos. / Nation / Player

== Notable players ==
- Oleksiy Chychykov
- Illya Kovalenko

== Honours ==
- Ukrainian Amateur Football Championship
  - Winners (1): 2023–24
- Ukrainian Amateur Cup
  - Winners (1): 2024–25

== League and cup history ==
Season	Div.	Pos.	Pl.	W	D	L	GS	GA	P	Domestic Cup	Europe		Notes
2024–25	4th Group 2	1_{/10}	18	12	2	4	44	22	38	-	-	-	Qualification to final stage:FC Mykolaiv 1-2 4-1 (a.e.t.);Atlet Kyiv 2-3 1–2
2025–26	4th Group 2	3	16	11	2	3	43	16	35	Round of 16 (1/8)	-	-	
2026–27	4th Group 2	3	3	2	0	1	6	4	6	Round of 32 (1/16)	-	-	
