= Oleksiy Chychykov =

Ukrainian footballer

Oleksiy Chychykоv
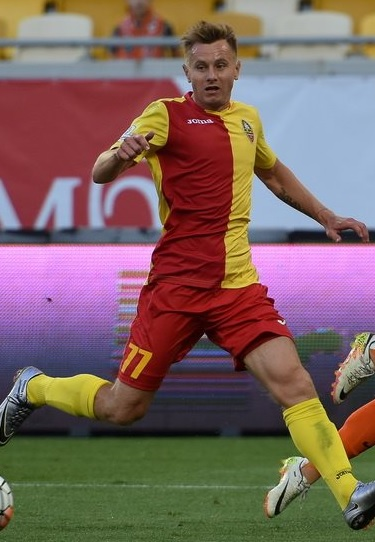
- Oleksiy Chychykov in 2016

Personal information
- Full name: Oleksiy Chychykоv
- Date of birth: 30 September 1987 (age 39)
- Place of birth: Kremenchuk, Ukraine
- Height: 1.80 m (5 ft 11 in)
- Position: Forward

Team information
- Current team: Ahrotekh Tyshkivka

Youth career
- Vorskla Poltava Youth

Senior career*
Years	Team	Apps	(Gls)
2004–2005	Vorskla Poltava	7	(3)
2004	→ Vorskla-2 Poltava	11	(1)
2006–2007	Lokomotiv Moskva	0	(0)
2006	→ Dnipro Dnipropetrovsk (loan)	2	(0)
2008–2013	Vorskla Poltava	77	(5)
2013–2018	Zirka Kropyvnytskyi	117	(27)
2018–2020	Dnipro-1	61	(13)
2021	Akzhayik	0	(0)
2022–2023	Zirka Kropyvnytskyi		
2023–2024	Ahrotekh Tyshkivka		
- * Club domestic league appearances and goals

Oleksiy Chychykоv (born 30 September 1987) is a Ukrainian professional football forward who plays for Ahrotekh Tyshkivka.

== Career ==
He played for Vorskla Poltava in the Ukrainian Premier League. He joined Vorskla Poltava from Lokomotiv Moskva in February 2008.

He played one game for FC Lokomotiv Moscow in the Russian Cup 2006–07 season (Lokomotiv ended up winning that tournament).

== Personal life ==
He is the son of Hryhorii Chychykov.
