= Rokyta, Poltava Oblast =

Rokyta Рокита
- Village
- Interactive map of Rokyta
- Location of Rokyta Rokyta (Ukraine)
- Coordinates: 49°35′11″N 33°37′40″E
- Country: Ukraine
- Oblast: Poltava Oblast
- Raion: Myrhorod Raion
- Hromada: Bilotserkivka rural hromada
- Founded: 18th century

Area
  - Total: 2.304 km^{2} (0.890 sq mi)

Population (2001)
  - Total: 932
  - Density: 404.51/km^{2} (1,047.7/sq mi)
- Time zone: UTC+2 (EET)
  - Summer (DST): UTC+3 (EEST)
- Postal code: 38353
- Area code: +380 5345

Rokyta (Ukrainian: Рокита) is a village in Myrhorod Raion, Poltava Oblast. It is part of the Bilotserkivka community (rural hromada).

The village has existed since the second half of the 18th century. Since 1958, there has been a collective farm "Mayak Komunizmu." After the dissolution of the Soviet Union, it became a farmer's company "Mayak."

== Sport ==
The village has its own football club. The village's football traditions extend back as early as 1993, when the village football team "Mayak" was established. Since 2010, the village has been home to another football club, FC Rokyta.
