= Bohdan Porokh =

Ukrainian footballer

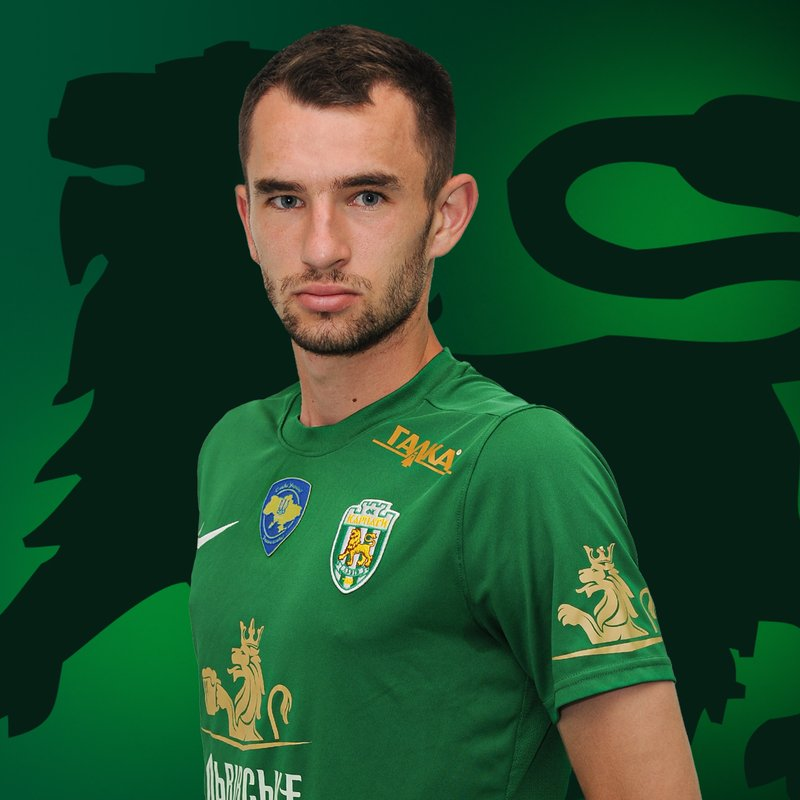

Personal information
- Full name: Bohdan Valentynovych Porokh
- Date of birth: 5 August 2000 (age 26)
- Place of birth: Pavlohrad, Ukraine
- Height: 1.89 m (6 ft 2 in)
- Position: Centre-back

Team information
- Current team: Metalist Kharkiv
- Number: 31

Youth career
- 2010–2013: Kosmos Pavlohrad
- 2013–2015: Metalurh Donetsk
- 2015–2016: Dnipro Dnipropetrovsk
- 2016–2017: DVUFK Dnipro
- 2017–2018: Stal Kamianske

Senior career*
Years	Team	Apps	(Gls)
2018–2021	Mykolaiv	40	(2)
2018–2020	→ Mykolaiv-2	35	(3)
2021–	Metalist Kharkiv	69	(3)
2023	→ Karpaty Lviv (loan)	9	(0)
- * Club domestic league appearances and goals as of 4 June 2026

Bohdan Valentynovych Porokh (Ukrainian: Богдан Валентинович Порох; born 5 August 2000, Pavlohrad, Dnipropetrovsk Oblast, Ukraine) is a Ukrainian professional footballer who plays as a centre-back for Ukrainian club Metalist Kharkiv.
