= Maksym Kovalyov =

Ukrainian footballer

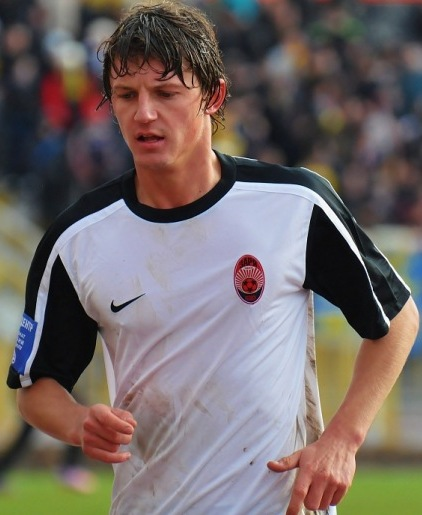

Personal information
- Full name: Maksym Serhiyovych Kovalyov
- Date of birth: 20 March 1989 (age 37)
- Place of birth: Alchevsk, Ukrainian SSR
- Height: 1.84 m (6 ft 1/2 in)
- Position: Defender

Team information
- Current team: Ahrotekh Tyshkivka
- Number: 55

Youth career
- 2001–2002: Stal Alchevsk
- 2003–2005: Shakhtar Donetsk

Senior career*
Years	Team	Apps	(Gls)
2005–2012	Shakhtar Donetsk	1	(0)
2005	→ Shakhtar-2 Donetsk	1	(0)
2005–2008	→ Shakhtar-3 Donetsk	38	(2)
2010–2011	→ Zorya Luhansk (loan)	34	(0)
2011–2012	→ Illichivets Mariupol (loan)	7	(0)
2012–2015	Illichivets Mariupol	0	(0)
2013–2015	→ Stal Alchevsk (loan)	41	(0)
2015–2018	Zirka Kropyvnytskyi	61	(0)
2018–2023	Inhulets Petrove	92	(6)
2023–2024	LNZ Cherkasy	11	(1)
2024–	Ahrotekh Tyshkivka	11	(0)

International career^{‡}
2004–2005	Ukraine U16	20	(3)
2005–2006	Ukraine U17	14	(3)
2006–2007	Ukraine U18	14	(2)
2007–2008	Ukraine U19	13	(2)
- * Club domestic league appearances and goals as of 2 July 2024 ‡ National team caps and goals as of 5 June 2018

Maksym Kovalyov (Ukrainian: Максим Сергійович Ковальов, born 20 March 1989) is a Ukrainian professional footballer who plays as a defender for Ahrotekh Tyshkivka.

== Career ==
He is product of FC Stal Alchevsk and FC Shakhtar Donetsk academy systems. His first trainer was Vyacheslav Frantsev.
