= FC Atlet Kyiv =

Atlet Kyiv
- Full name: Football club Atlet Kyiv
- Founded: 15 July 2006
- Ground: DYuSSh Atlet
- Capacity: 300
- Chairman: Oleksiy Lykhochas
- Manager: Dmytro Murashenko
- League: Ukrainian Second League
- 2025–26: Second League, 7th in Group B
- Website: http://fcatlet.kiev.ua/

The Football Club Atlet Kyiv (Ukrainian: футбольний клуб Атлет); is a Ukrainian football club from Kyiv. The club is located in the Kyiv's neighborhood of Darnytsia which is a historical populated place on the left bank of Dnieper.

== Brief history ==
The club was formed in 2006 (by some sources 2003) by coaches from the Atlet sports school (DYuSSh) to provide an opportunity for school graduates to improve their football skills and continue their playing careers. The Atlet sports school has existed since 1970.

Starting from 2006, Atlet was a permanent member of the Kyiv city football competitions (Football Federation of Kyiv).

In 2018, it debuted at the national level, competing in AAFU competitions such as the championship and cup. Since then, the club completed 6 seasons in the AAFU football league competitions and a few cup competitions.

In 2025, it was admitted to the Ukrainian Second League.

== Players ==
=== Current squad ===
As of 1 March 2026 Note: Flags indicate national team as defined under FIFA eligibility rules; some limited exceptions apply. Players may hold more than one non-FIFA nationality.

No.	Pos.	Nation	Player
1	GK	UKR	Maksym Komarenko
3	DF	UKR	Mykhailo Biloserov
4	MF	UKR	Artem Pishak
5	MF	UKR	Dmytro Hlushko
7	FW	UKR	Andriy Lypovyi
8	MF	UKR	Ivan Murashenko
10	MF	UKR	Nazar Presych
11	MF	UKR	Oleksandr Krytskyi
14	MF	UKR	Serhiy Stepanov
15	MF	UKR	Anton Hordyeyev
16	DF	UKR	Yevheniy Danylenko
17	MF	UKR	Maksym Kavun
18	MF	UKR	Artem Strilets
20	DF	UKR	Danyil Tyshchenko
21	MF	UKR	Serhiy Chenbay

No.	Pos.	Nation	Player
22	MF	UKR	Mykyta Movchan
25	MF	UKR	Illya Shpachenko
26	MF	UKR	Nazar Harkusha
27	MF	UKR	Vladyslav Kulakevych
28	MF	UKR	Farman Teymurov
30	GK	UKR	Vladyslav Kiyashko
48	DF	UKR	Dmytro Panasyuk
64	DF	UKR	Daniil Melnyk
77	MF	UKR	Rostyslav Babich
90	MF	UKR	Serhiy Chepa
94	MF	UKR	Ilya Khavro
95	FW	UKR	Mykhaylo Klyatskyi
99	MF	UKR	Serhiy Shyshkin
—	DF	UKR	Andriy Romanenko
—	MF	UKR	Oleksandr Moskalenko

=== Out on loan ===
Note: Flags indicate national team as defined under FIFA eligibility rules; some limited exceptions apply. Players may hold more than one non-FIFA nationality.

No. / Pos. / Nation / Player	No. / Pos. / Nation / Player

=== Other players under contract ===
Note: Flags indicate national team as defined under FIFA eligibility rules; some limited exceptions apply. Players may hold more than one non-FIFA nationality.

No. / Pos. / Nation / Player	No. / Pos. / Nation / Player

== League and cup history ==
Season	Div.	Pos.	Pl.	W	D	L	GS	GA	P	Domestic Cup	Europe		Notes
2019–20	4th (Amateur League:Group 2)	7_{/12}	22	8	3	11	32	45	27	-	-	-	
2020–21	4th (Amateur League:Group 2)	5_{/11}	20	7	7	6	33	34	28	-	-	-	
2021–22	4th (Amateur League:Group 2)	5_{/10}	9	5	0	4	20	13	15	-	-	-	
2022–23	4th (Amateur League:Group 2)	6_{/8}	14	5	0	9	19	22	15	-	-	-	
2023–24	4th (Amateur League:Group 2)	5_{/9}	16	6	4	6	26	23	22	-	-	-	
2024–25	4th (Amateur League:Group 2)	2_{/10}	18	12	1	5	37	13	37	-	-	-	Final stage:Quarterfinals-Ahron Velyki Hayi 1-1 3-0 (4-1);Semifinals- FC Ahrotekh Tyshkivka 3-2 2-1 (5-3); Final-Dnister Zalishchyky 1-3 (a.e.t.) Admission to Ukrainian Second League
2025–26	3th (Second League:Group A)	5_{/11}	30	14	4	12	45	48	46	Round of 64 (1/32)	-	-	-
2026–27	3th (Second League:Group B)	2_{/9}	11	4	5	2	18	13	17	Round of 64 (1/32)	-	-	TBD

== Honours ==
- Ukrainian Football Amateur League
  - Runners-up (1): 2024–25
- Kyiv city (1st tier)
  - Winners (2): 2022–23, 2023–24
  - Runners-up (5): 2008, 2017–18, 2018–19, 2020–21, 2022–23
- Kyiv city (2nd tier)
  - Winners (1): 2007
  - Runners-up (2): 2006, 2013

== Notable graduates of the Atlet sports school ==
- Oleksandr Andriyevskyi
- Vladyslav Buhay
- Serhiy Chenbay
- Yuriy Klymchuk
- Oleksandr Kucher
- Bohdan Lyednyev
- Yevheniy Morozko
