= Oleksandr Kobelyash =

Ukrainian footballer

Personal information
- Full name: Oleksandr Myroslavovych Kobelyash
- Date of birth: 30 August 2000 (age 26)
- Place of birth: Uzhhorod, Ukraine
- Height: 1.92 m (6 ft 4 in)
- Position: Centre-back

Team information
- Current team: Uzhhorod
- Number: 30

Youth career
- 2013–2016: UFK-Metal Kharkiv
- 2014–2016: → KDYuSSh-4 Kharkiv (loan)
- 2016: Spartakus Uzhhorod
- 2016–2017: SDYuSShOR Uzhhorod

Senior career*
Years	Team	Apps	(Gls)
2016	Vityaz Kontsovo	1	(0)
2017–2021	Oleksandriya	0	(0)
2021	SDYuSShOR Uzhhorod	2	(0)
2021–	Uzhhorod	7	(0)
- * Club domestic league appearances and goals as of 13 February 2022

Oleksandr Myroslavovych Kobelyash (Ukrainian: Олександр Мирославович Кобеляш; born 30 August 2000) is a Ukrainian professional footballer who plays as a centre-back for Ukrainian club Uzhhorod.
