= Illya Kovalenko =

Ukrainian footballer

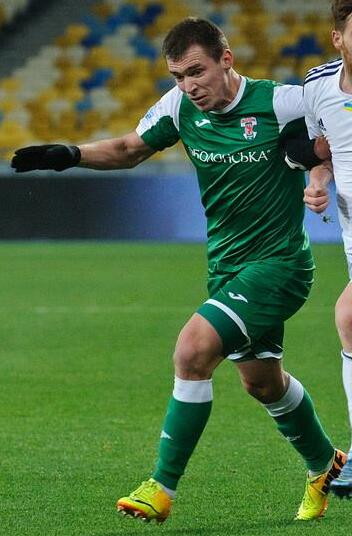
- Illya Kovalenko playing for Obolon-Brovar Kyiv in 2015

Personal information
- Full name: Illya Oleksandrovych Kovalenko
- Date of birth: 20 March 1990 (age 36)
- Place of birth: Kalanchak, Ukrainian SSR
- Height: 1.77 m (5 ft 10 in)
- Position: Midfielder

Youth career
- 2006–2007: Stal Dniprodzerzhynsk

Senior career*
Years	Team	Apps	(Gls)
2009	Stal Dniprodzerzhynsk	10	(0)
2010–2012	Kryvbas Kryvyi Rih	18	(2)
2011	→ Naftovyk-Ukrnafta Okhtyrka (loan)	17	(1)
2013	Poltava	15	(0)
2014–2016	Obolon-Brovar Kyiv	82	(20)
2017–2018	Desna Chernihiv	21	(3)
2018	→ Sumy (loan)	8	(2)
2018	→ Inhulets Petrove (loan)	13	(1)
2019–2022	Inhulets Petrove	70	(6)
2022	LNZ Cherkasy	0	(0)
2022	Ekranas		
2022	LNZ Cherkasy	0	(0)
2022	Akzhayik	9	(1)
2023	LNZ Cherkasy	5	(0)
2023	Podillya Khmelnytskyi	12	(0)
2024–2025	Dinaz Vyshhorod	14	(1)
2025–	Ahrotekh Tyshkivka		
- * Club domestic league appearances and goals

Illya Oleksandrovych Kovalenko (Ukrainian: Ілля Олександрович Коваленко; born 20 March 1990) is a Ukrainian professional footballer who plays as a midfielder for Dinaz Vyshhorod.

== Career ==
Kovalenko is a product of the FC Stal Dniprodzerzhynsk academy. He became known during the 2016–17 Ukrainian First League season when he scored 12 goals playing for Obolon-Brovar Kyiv and Desna Chernihiv.

In 2022 he moved to Akzhayik, where he got into the final of the Kazakhstan Cup in 2022.

== Honours ==
FC Ahrotekh Tyshkivka

- Ukrainian Amateur League:2025–26

Akzhayik

- Kazakhstan Cup: Runner-up 2022

Inhulets Petrove

- Ukrainian First League: 2019–20
- Ukrainian Cup Runner up 2018–19

Desna Chernihiv

- Ukrainian First League: 2017–18
