= Hlib Savchuk =

Ukrainian footballer

Personal information
- Full name: Hlib Oleksandrovych Savchuk
- Date of birth: 17 February 2003 (age 23)
- Place of birth: Khmelnytskyi, Ukraine
- Height: 1.86 m (6 ft 1 in)
- Position: Defender

Team information
- Current team: Epitsentr
- Number: 6

Youth career
- 2015–2016: Podillya Khmelnytskyi
- 2016–2020: UFK-Karpaty Lviv

Senior career*
Years	Team	Apps	(Gls)
2020–2021	Karpaty Lviv	8	(0)
2021–2024	Rukh Lviv	0	(0)
2023–2024	→ Podillya Khmelnytskyi (loan)	26	(2)
2024–	Epitsentr	19	(1)

International career^{‡}
2019–2020	Ukraine U17	5	(0)
- * Club domestic league appearances and goals as of 24 December 2025 ‡ National team caps and goals as of 10 August 2023

Hlib Oleksandrovych Savchuk (Ukrainian: Гліб Олександрович Савчук; born 17 February 2003) is a Ukrainian professional footballer who plays as a defender for Epitsentr.

== Career ==
Born in Khmelnytskyi, Savchuk is a product of the local Podillya Khmelnytskyi (where his first coach was Oleksandr Irkliyenko) and Karpaty Lviv academies.

He played for Karpaty Lviv in the Ukrainian Second League and in February 2021 he was transferred to another team from Lviv – Rukh, and made his debut for FC Rukh as the start squad player in the away winning match against MFC Mykolaiv on 21 September 2021 in the Round of 32 of the Ukrainian Cup.
