= FC Dnister Zalishchyky =

Football club from Zalishchyky, Ukraine

Dnister Zalishchyky
- Full name: Football Club Dnister Zalishchyky
- Founded: 1913
- Ground: Dnister, Zalishchyky
- Capacity: 330
- Chairman: Yuriy Kuts
- Manager: Valeriy Ivashchenko

Dnister Zalishchyky (Ukrainian: Дністер Заліщики) is a professional football club from the city of Zalishchyky, Ukraine.

== Brief history ==
Zalishchyky is located on the banks of the Dniester River, hence the club's name. The first mention of the football club Dnister from Zalishchyky is claimed to date back to 1913.

In 1975, Dnister made their debut at the Ukrainian KFK competitions. They placed 4th in Group 1 among 7 participants. In 1976, as Kolos Zalishchyky, they once again took part in the Ukrainian KFK competitions. They placed 10th in Group 2 among 11 participants. It took another 10 years before Dnister returned to the Ukrainian KFK competitions. In 1986, they placed 8th in Group 2 among 9 participants.

From the 1992 to 1994–95 seasons, the club competed at the professional level. In 1995, the club withdrew from professional competitions and, until 2011, competed in the Zalishchyky Raion football competitions.

== Honours ==
Logo used in 1990s

- Transitional League
  - Winners (1): 1992 (shared)
- Ukrainian Football Amateur League
  - Winners (1): 2024–25
- Ternopil Oblast Football Championship
  - Winners (4): 1974, 1985, 1990, 2004
  - Runners-up (2): 2013, 2015

== Managers ==
- (Ukraine) Ihor Lysak (1991 – 1993)
- (Ukraine) Petro Chervin (1992 – 1992)
- (Ukraine) Ihor Lysak (1994 – 1995)
- (Ukraine) Oleh Shelayev (1 July 2024 – 9 March 2025)
- (Ukraine) Oleh Krasnopyorov (19 March 2025 – 22 June 2026)
- (Ukraine) Valeriy Ivashchenko (2026 – present)

== League and cup history ==
Season	Div.	Pos.	Pl.	W	D	L	GS	GA	P	Domestic Cup	Other	Notes
1986	4th (KFK competitions)	8	16	1	3	12	16	40	5			
1991	4th (KFK competitions)	2	28	17	4	7	48	24	38			Admitted to Transitional League
1992	3rd (Second League)	1	16	8	5	3	15	13	21			
1992–93	3rd (Second League)	15	34	11	5	18	30	45	27	Q1 round		
1993–94	3rd (Second League)	21	42	10	9	23	29	62	29	Q1 round		Relegated
1994–95	3rd (lower) (Third League)	22	42	5	4	33	18	40	19	Q1 round		Relegated

Season	Div.	Pos.	Pl.	W	D	L	GS	GA	P	Domestic Cup	Europe		Notes
2024–25	4th (Amateur League:Group 1)	2_{/10}	18	13	1	4	45	15	40	-	-	-	Final stage:Quarterfinals- Avanhard Lozova 1-2 2-0 (3-2);Semifinals- FC Rebel Kyiv 1-0 0-1 (1-1) (2-4p)
2025–26	4th (Amateur League:Group 1)	2_{/10}	18	10	4	4	36	15	34	-	-	-	Final stage:Quarterfinals- FC Ahrotekh Tyshkivka 3-1 0-2 (3-3) (2-3p) Admission to Ukrainian Second League
2026–27	3th (Second League:Group A)	3_{/9}	12	6	3	3	20	15	21	Round of 64 (1/32)	-	-	TBD
