= Mykhailivka-Rubezhivka =

Village in Kyiv Oblast, Ukraine

Mykhailivka-Rubezhivka Михайлівка-Рубежівка
- Village
- Location within Kyiv Oblast Location within Ukraine
- Coordinates: 50°30′01″N 30°08′45″E
- Country: Ukraine
- Oblast: Kyiv
- Raion: Bucha

Area
  - Total: 3.5 km^{2} (1.4 sq mi)

Population
  - Total: 3,430
  - Density: 980/km^{2} (2,500/sq mi)
- Postal code: 08110
- Area code: +380 4597

Mykhailivka-Rubezhivka (Ukrainian: Михайлівка-Рубежівка) is a village in Bucha Raion, Kyiv Oblast, Ukraine. It belongs to Irpin urban hromada, one of the hromadas of Ukraine. Mykhailivka-Rubezhivka is located 16 km west of Kyiv and was formed as a result of the merging of the villages of Mykhailivka and Rubezhivka. It has a population of 3,430.

The village is considered to have been founded in 1629.

Until 18 July 2020, Mykhailivka-Rubezhivka was located in Kyiv-Sviatoshyn Raion. The raion was abolished that day as part of the administrative reform of Ukraine, which reduced the number of raions of Kyiv Oblast to seven. The area of Kyiv-Sviatoshyn Raion was split between Bucha, Fastiv, and Obukhiv Raions, with Mykhailivka-Rubezhivka being transferred to Bucha Raion.

On 3 March 2022, the village was captured by Russian forces during the 2022 Russian invasion of Ukraine. Later, the village was reported to be suffering a humanitarian crisis, alongside other Ukrainian settlements. The village was later liberated by Ukrainian forces on 2 April.
