= Ihor Zahalskyi =

Ukrainian footballer

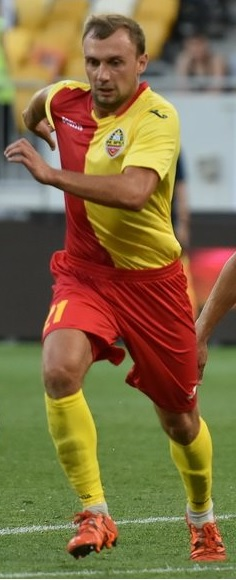

Personal information
- Full name: Ihor Volodymyrovych Zahalskyi
- Date of birth: 19 May 1991 (age 35)
- Place of birth: Kirovohrad, Ukrainian SSR
- Height: 1.72 m (5 ft 7 1/2 in)
- Position: Midfielder

Team information
- Current team: Metalurh Zaporizhya
- Number: 7

Youth career
- 2001–2004: Olimpik Kirovohrad
- 2004–2006: Youth Sportive School #2 Kirovohrad
- 2006–2007: FC Ametyst Oleksandriya

Senior career*
Years	Team	Apps	(Gls)
2007–2009	Olimpik Kirovohrad	20	(4)
2010–2011	Dnipro Dnipropetrovsk	0	(0)
2011	Olimpik Kirovohrad	6	(2)
2012–2018	Zirka Kropyvnytskyi	88	(13)
2012	→ Zirka-2 Kirovohrad	129	(17)
2018–2019	Dnipro-1	28	(4)
2020	Inhulets Petrove	8	(0)
2020	Obolon Kyiv	6	(0)
2021	Metalurh Zaporizhya	0	(0)
2022	Zirka Kropyvnytskyi		
2023–	Ahrotekh Tyshkivka		
- * Club domestic league appearances and goals

Ihor Zahalskyi (Ukrainian: Ігор Володимирович Загальський; born 19 May 1991) is a professional Ukrainian football midfielder who plays for Ahrotekh Tyshkivka.

== Career ==
Zahalskyi is a product of the different sportive schools in his native Kirovohrad Oblast. He spent time with different Ukrainian teams, and in 2012 he signed a contract with FC Zirka from his native Kropyvnytskyi.

In 2015 Zahalskyi was a member of the Ukrainian student football team at the Summer Universiade in Gwangju, South Korea.

On 28 May 2018 he signed contract with SC Dnipro-1.
