= 2024–25 in Ukrainian football =

Football in Ukraine
- Season: 2024–25

Men's football
- Premier League: Dynamo Kyiv
- First League: Epitsentr Kamianets-Podilskyi
- Second League: Probiy Horodenka
- AAFU: Dnister Zalishchyky
- Cup: Shakhtar Donetsk
- Amateur Cup: Ahrotekh Tyshkivka
- Super Cup: not held

Women's football
- Vyshcha Liha: Vorskla Poltava
- Persha Liha: Pohoryna Kostopil
- Women's Cup: Vorskla Poltava

The 2024-25 season was the 34th season of competitive association football in Ukraine since the dissolution of the Soviet Union.

With the continuation of the Russo-Ukrainian War, the Ukrainian Association of Football (UAF) decided to go forward with the continuation of another season. The UAF approved round-robin tournaments in all national league competitions under strict safety precautions.

== National teams ==
=== Ukraine national football team ===
==== UEFA Nations League ====
===== Group 1 =====
Pos	Team	Pld	W	D	L	GF	GA	GD	Pts	Promotion, qualification or relegation	(Czech Republic)	(Ukraine)	(Georgia (country))	(Albania)
1	Czech Republic (P)	6	3	2	1	9	8	+1	11	Promotion to League A	—	3–2	2–1	2–0
2	Ukraine	6	2	2	2	8	8	0	8	Qualification for promotion play-offs	1–1	—	1–0	1–2
3	Georgia (O)	6	2	1	3	7	6	+1	7 (Note: Tied on head-to-head results. Overall goal difference: Georgia +1, Albania –2.)	Qualification for relegation play-offs	4–1	1–1	—	0–1
4	Albania (R)	6	2	1	3	4	6	−2	7	Relegation to League C	0–0	1–2	0–1	—

Source: UEFA
(O) Play-off winners; (P) Promoted; (R) Relegated

===== Promotion/relegation playoffs =====
Team 1	Agg.	Team 2	1st leg	2nd leg
Ukraine	3–4	Belgium	3–1	0–3

=== Ukraine Olympic football team ===
==== 2024 Summer Olympics ====
===== Group B =====
Pos	Team	Pld	W	D	L	GF	GA	GD	Pts	Qualification
1	Morocco	3	2	0	1	6	3	+3	6 (Note: Head-to-head points: Morocco 3, Argentina 0.)	Advance to knockout stage
2	Argentina	3	2	0	1	6	3	+3	6	Advance to knockout stage
3	Ukraine	3	1	0	2	3	5	−2	3	
4	Iraq	3	1	0	2	3	7	−4	3	

Source: FIFA
Notes:
24 July 2024
19:00

Iraq	2–1	Ukraine
Hussein 57' (pen.); Jasim 75'	Report	Rubchynskyi 53'

Stade de Lyon, Décines-Charpieu
Attendance: 10,637
Referee: Mahmood Ali Ismail (Sudan)
27 July 2024
17:00

Ukraine	2–1	Morocco
Kryskiv 22'; Krasnopir 90+8'	Report	Rahimi 64' (pen.)

Stade Geoffroy-Guichard, Saint-Étienne
Attendance: 28,655
Referee: Saíd Martínez (Honduras)
30 July 2024
17:00

Ukraine	0–2	Argentina
	Report	Almada 47'; Echeverri 90+1'

Stade de Lyon, Décines-Charpieu
Attendance: 10,017
Referee: Dahane Beida (Mauritania)

==== Friendlies ====
===== Results and fixtures =====
14 July 2024 Friendly	Ukraine	1–1	Egypt	Saint-Paul-lès-Dax, France
19:00 UTC+2	Braharu 12'	Report		Stadium: Plaine des Sports

18 July 2024 Friendly	Ukraine	2–2	Paraguay	Hagetmau, France
19:00 UTC+2	Khlan 31'; Fedor 83'	Report	Parzajuk 86'; Fernández 89'	Stadium: Alain Lansaman

=== Ukraine women's national football team ===
==== UEFA Women's Euro 2025 ====
===== UEFA Women's Euro 2025 qualifying League B =====
Pos	Team	Pld	W	D	L	GF	GA	GD	Pts	Qualification	(Wales)	(Ukraine)	(Croatia)	(Kosovo)
1	Wales (P)	6	4	2	0	18	3	+15	14	Advance to play-offs and promotion to League A	—	1–1	4–0	2–0
2	Ukraine	6	3	2	1	11	4	+7	11	Advance to play-offs	2–2	—	2–0	2–0
3	Croatia	6	3	0	3	4	9	−5	9	Advance to play-offs	0–3	1–0	—	2–0
4	Kosovo (R)	6	0	0	6	0	17	−17	0	Relegation to League C	0–6	0–4	0–1	—

Source: UEFA
Rules for classification: Tiebreakers
(P) Promoted; (R) Relegated

===== UEFA Women's Euro 2025 qualifying play-offs =====
====== First round ======
Team 1	Agg.	Team 2	1st leg	2nd leg
Turkey	1–3	Ukraine	1–1	0–2

====== Second round ======
Team 1	Agg.	Team 2	1st leg	2nd leg
Ukraine	1–4	Belgium	0–2	1–2

==== 2025 UEFA Women's Nations League ====
===== 2025 UEFA Women's Nations League B =====
Pos	Team	Pld	W	D	L	GF	GA	GD	Pts	Promotion, qualification or relegation	(Ukraine)	(Czech Republic)	(Albania)	(Croatia)
1	Ukraine (P)	6	4	1	1	8	6	+2	13 (Note: Head-to-head points: Ukraine 4, Czech Republic 1.)	Promotion to League A	—	1–0	2–1	2–1
2	Czech Republic	6	4	1	1	17	4	+13	13	Qualification for promotion play-offs	1–1	—	5–1	5–0
3	Albania (O)	6	2	0	4	10	12	−2	6	Qualification for relegation play-offs	1–2	1–2	—	4–0
4	Croatia (R)	6	1	0	5	4	17	−13	3	Relegation to League C	2–0	0–4	1–2	—

Source: UEFA
Rules for classification: Tiebreakers
(O) Play-off winners; (P) Promoted; (R) Relegated

== UEFA competitions ==
=== UEFA Champions League ===
==== Qualifying phase and play-off round ====
===== Second qualifying round =====
Second qualifying round
Team 1	Agg.	Team 2	1st leg	2nd leg
League Path
Dynamo Kyiv (Ukraine)	9–2	(Serbia) Partizan	6–2	3–0

- Due to the Russo-Ukrainian War, Dynamo Kyiv played its home matches in Lublin, Poland.

===== Third qualifying round =====
Third qualifying round
Team 1	Agg.	Team 2	1st leg	2nd leg
League Path
Dynamo Kyiv (Ukraine)	3–1	(Scotland) Rangers	1–1	2–0

- Due to the Russo-Ukrainian War, Dynamo Kyiv played its home matches in Lublin, Poland.

===== Play-off round =====
Play-off round
Team 1	Agg.	Team 2	1st leg	2nd leg
League Path
Dynamo Kyiv (Ukraine)	1–3	(Austria) Red Bull Salzburg	0–2	1–1

- Due to the Russo-Ukrainian War, Dynamo Kyiv played its home matches in Lublin, Poland.

==== League stage ====
Pos	Team	Pld	W	D	L	GF	GA	GD	Pts
25	(Croatia) Dinamo Zagreb	8	3	2	3	12	19	−7	11
26	(Germany) VfB Stuttgart	8	3	1	4	13	17	−4	10
27	(Ukraine) Shakhtar Donetsk	8	2	1	5	8	16	−8	7
28	(Italy) Bologna	8	1	3	4	4	9	−5	6
29	(Serbia) Red Star Belgrade	8	2	0	6	13	22	−9	6

Source: UEFA
Rules for classification: League phase tiebreakers

Home team	Score	Away team
Bologna (Italy)	0–0	(Ukraine) Shakhtar Donetsk
Shakhtar Donetsk (Ukraine)	0–3	(Italy) Atalanta
Arsenal (England)	1–0	(Ukraine) Shakhtar Donetsk
Shakhtar Donetsk (Ukraine)	2–1	(Switzerland) Young Boys
PSV Eindhoven (Netherlands)	3–2	(Ukraine) Shakhtar Donetsk
Shakhtar Donetsk (Ukraine)	1–5	(Germany) Bayern Munich
Shakhtar Donetsk (Ukraine)	2–0	(France) Brest
Borussia Dortmund (Germany)	3–1	(Ukraine) Shakhtar Donetsk

- Due to the Russo-Ukrainian War, Shakhtar Donetsk played its home match in Gelsenkirchen, Germany.

=== UEFA Europa League ===
==== Qualifying phase and play-off round ====
===== Third qualifying round =====
Third qualifying round
Team 1	Agg.	Team 2	1st leg	2nd leg
Main Path
Kryvbas Kryvyi Rih (Ukraine)	1–3	(Czech Republic) Viktoria Plzeň	1–2	0–1

- Due to the Russo-Ukrainian War, Kryvbas Kryvyi Rih played its home match in Košice, Slovakia.

==== League stage ====
Pos	Team	Pld	W	D	L	GF	GA	GD	Pts
32	(Latvia) RFS	8	1	2	5	6	13	−7	5
33	(Bulgaria) Ludogorets Razgrad	8	0	4	4	4	11	−7	4
34	(Ukraine) Dynamo Kyiv	8	1	1	6	5	18	−13	4
35	(France) Nice	8	0	3	5	7	16	−9	3
36	(Azerbaijan) Qarabağ	8	1	0	7	6	20	−14	3

Source: UEFA
Rules for classification: League phase tiebreakers

Home team	Score	Away team
Dynamo Kyiv (Ukraine)	0–3	(Italy) Lazio
TSG Hoffenheim (Germany)	2–0	(Ukraine) Dynamo Kyiv
Roma (Italy)	1–0	(Ukraine) Dynamo Kyiv
Dynamo Kyiv (Ukraine)	0–4	(Hungary) Ferencváros
Dynamo Kyiv (Ukraine)	1–2	(Czech Republic) Viktoria Plzeň
Real Sociedad (Spain)	3–0	(Ukraine) Dynamo Kyiv
Galatasaray (Turkey)	3–3	(Ukraine) Dynamo Kyiv
Dynamo Kyiv (Ukraine)	1–0	(Latvia) RFS

- Due to the Russo-Ukrainian War, Dynamo Kyiv played its home match in Hamburg, Germany.

=== UEFA Europe Conference League ===
==== Qualifying phase and play-off round ====
===== Second qualifying round =====
Second qualifying round
Team 1	Agg.	Team 2	1st leg	2nd leg
Main Path
Olimpija Ljubljana (Slovenia)	4–1	(Ukraine) Polissya Zhytomyr	2–0	2–1
Dnipro-1 (Ukraine)	0–6	(Hungary) Puskás Akadémia	0–3 (Note: Dnipro-1 forfeited its two matches due to bankruptcy.)	0–3

- Due to the Russo-Ukrainian War, Polissya Zhytomyr played its home match in Gliwice, Poland, while Dnipro-1 was expected to play its home match in Košice, Slovakia.

===== Play-off round =====
Main Path
Team 1	Agg.	Team 2	1st leg	2nd leg
Kryvbas Kryvyi Rih (Ukraine)	0–5	(Spain) Real Betis	0–2	0–3

- Due to the Russo-Ukrainian War, Kryvbas Kryvyi Rih played its home match in Košice, Slovakia.

=== UEFA Women's Champions League ===
==== Qualifying round ====
===== Round 1 =====
====== Champions Path ======
Tournament 10

Hosted by Ferencváros.

Semi-finals
4 September
(Hungary) Ferencváros	2
(Estonia) Flora	1
4 September
(Ukraine) Vorskla Poltava	5
(Latvia) SFK Rīga	0

Final
7 September
(Hungary) Ferencváros	0
(Ukraine) Vorskla Poltava	2
Third place
7 September
(Estonia) Flora (a.e.t.) (p)	0 (7)
(Latvia) SFK Rīga	0 (6)

====== League Path ======
Tournament 1

Hosted by Brøndby.

Semi-finals
4 September
(Denmark) Brøndby	0
(Italy) Fiorentina	1
4 September
(Netherlands) Ajax (a.e.t.)	4
(Ukraine) Kolos Kovalivka	1

Final
7 September
(Italy) Fiorentina	1
(Netherlands) Ajax	0
Third place
7 September
(Denmark) Brøndby	2
(Ukraine) Kolos Kovalivka	1

===== Round 2 =====
The first legs will be played on 22 September, and the second legs on 26 September 2024.

The winners of the ties advanced to the group stage.

Round 2
Team 1	Agg.	Team 2	1st leg	2nd leg
Champions Path
Vorskla Poltava (Ukraine)	0–3	(Scotland) Celtic	0–1	0–2

== Men's club football ==
League		Promoted to league	Relegated from league
Premier League		Inhulets Petrove; Karpaty Lviv; Livyi Bereh Kyiv	Mynai; Metalist 1925 Kharkiv; ~~Dnipro-1~~
PFL League 1	Groups		
PFL League 1	A	none	Chernihiv-ShVSM; Hirnyk-Sport Horishni Plavni; ~~Kudrivka-Nyva~~ (merger)
PFL League 1	B	UCSA Tarasivka; Kudrivka	Chernihiv-ShVSM; Hirnyk-Sport Horishni Plavni; ~~Kudrivka-Nyva~~ (merger)
PFL League 2	Groups		
PFL League 2	A	Uzhhorod; Vilkhivtsi; Probiy Horodenka; Revera 1908 Ivano-Frankivsk; Kulykiv; Nyva-2 Ternopil; Polissya-2 Zhytomyr	~~Druzhba Myrivka~~; ~~PFC Zviahel~~; ~~Vast Mykolaiv~~; ~~Karpaty-2 Lviv~~; ~~Metalurh-2 Zaporizhia~~; ~~Kremin-2 Kremenchuk~~
PFL League 2	B	Vorskla-2 Poltava; Kolos-2 Kovalivka; Oleksandriya-2; Metalist 1925-d Kharkiv	~~Druzhba Myrivka~~; ~~PFC Zviahel~~; ~~Vast Mykolaiv~~; ~~Karpaty-2 Lviv~~; ~~Metalurh-2 Zaporizhia~~; ~~Kremin-2 Kremenchuk~~

Note: For all scratched clubs, see section Clubs removed for more details.

=== Premier League ===
Pos	Team	Pld	W	D	L	GF	GA	GD	Pts	Qualification or relegation
1	Dynamo Kyiv (C)	30	20	10	0	61	19	+42	70	Qualification for the Champions League second qualifying round
2	Oleksandriya	30	20	7	3	46	22	+24	67	Qualification for the Conference League second qualifying round
3	Shakhtar Donetsk	30	18	8	4	69	26	+43	62	Qualification for the Europa League first qualifying round (Note: Shakhtar Donetsk qualified for the Europa League first qualifying round by winning the 2024–25 Ukrainian Cup; the second Conference League spot was passed to the fourth-placed team.)
4	Polissya Zhytomyr	30	12	12	6	38	28	+10	48	Qualification for the Conference League second qualifying round
5	Kryvbas Kryvyi Rih	30	13	8	9	34	26	+8	47	
6	Karpaty Lviv	30	13	7	10	42	36	+6	46	
7	Zorya Luhansk	30	12	4	14	34	39	−5	40	
8	Rukh Lviv	30	9	11	10	30	27	+3	38	
9	Veres Rivne	30	9	9	12	33	44	−11	36 (Note: Head-to-head points: Veres Rivne 6, Kolos Kovalivka 0.)	
10	Kolos Kovalivka	30	8	12	10	27	25	+2	36	
11	Obolon Kyiv	30	8	8	14	19	43	−24	32	
12	LNZ Cherkasy	30	7	10	13	25	37	−12	31	
13	Vorskla Poltava (R)	30	6	9	15	24	38	−14	27	Qualification for the Relegation play-off
14	Livyi Bereh Kyiv (R)	30	7	5	18	18	39	−21	26	Qualification for the Relegation play-off
15	Inhulets Petrove (R)	30	5	9	16	21	47	−26	24	Relegation to Ukrainian First League
16	Chornomorets Odesa (R)	30	6	5	19	20	45	−25	23	Relegation to Ukrainian First League

Source: upl.ua
Rules for classification: 1) Points; 2) Head-to-head points; 3) Head-to-head goal difference; 4) Head-to-head goals scored; 5) Goal difference; 6) Goals scored; 7) Draw or "Golden match" if two teams tied for title (Article 22, paragraph 3).
(C) Champions; (R) Relegated

==== Relegation play-offs ====
Teams that placed 13th and 14th in the 2024–25 Ukrainian Premier League played two-leg play-off with the third and fourth teams of the 2024–25 Ukrainian First League. As a result, both the Ukrainian First League teams (Metalist 1925 and Kudrivka) received promotion after beating the Ukrainian Premier League teams (Vorskla and Livyi Bereh), which in turn were relegated. Due to the Russian 2025 summer escalation and the Russian ballistic missile attack warnings, on 1 June 2025, both matches were suspended but later renewed.

Team 1	Agg.	Team 2	1st leg	2nd leg
Kudrivka	2–2 (4–3 p)	Vorskla Poltava	1–2	1–0
Livyi Bereh Kyiv	0–2	Metalist 1925 Kharkiv	0–1	0–1

=== First Semi-final ===
29 May 2025	Kudrivka	1–2	Vorskla Poltava	Kyiv
15:30	Kozak 83'	Report	Ndukve 23'; Pavlyuk 39'	Stadium: Obolon Arena; Attendance: 1,100; Referee: Dmytro Panchyshyn (Kharkiv)

1 June 2025	Vorskla Poltava	0–1 (3–4 p)	Kudrivka	Poltava
13:00		Report	Lytovchenko 9'	Stadium: Vorskla; Attendance: 2,204; Referee: Mykola Balakin (Kyiv oblast)
	Penalties
	Ndukve (penalty scored); Malysh (penalty scored); Iyede (penalty missed); Kane (penalty missed); Salabay (penalty scored); Sklyar (penalty missed)		(penalty scored) Tuzenko; (penalty missed) Storchous; (penalty scored) Shershen; (penalty scored) Potimkov; (penalty missed) Serdyuk; (penalty scored) Liehostayev

2–2 on aggregate; Kudrivka won 4–3 on penalties and promotion to Premier League. While, Vorskla lost 3–4 on penalties and relegation to First League

=== Second Semi-final ===
29 May 2025	Livyi Bereh Kyiv	0–1	Metalist 1925 Kharkiv	Hnidyn, Kyiv Oblast
18:00		Report	Moura 38'	Stadium: Arena Livyi Bereh; Attendance: 1,167; Referee: Viktor Kopiyevskyi (Kropyvnytskyi)

1 June 2025	Metalist 1925 Kharkiv	1–0	Livyi Bereh Kyiv	Hnidyn, Kyiv Oblast
15:30	Kalitvintsev 90'	Report		Stadium: Arena Livyi Bereh; Attendance: 1,800; Referee: Vitaliy Romanov (Dnipro)

Metalist 1925 Kharkiv won 2–0 on aggregate and promotion to Premier League. While, Livyi Bereh Kyiv lost 0–2 on aggregate and relegation to First League.

=== PFL League 1 (First League) ===
==== Group A ====
Pos	Team	Pld	W	D	L	GF	GA	GD	Pts	Promotion, qualification or relegation
1	Epitsentr Kamianets-Podilskyi	14	8	5	1	21	7	+14	29	Qualified to the Promotion group
2	Ahrobiznes Volochysk	14	9	1	4	16	13	+3	28	Qualified to the Promotion group
3	Metalist Kharkiv	14	6	4	4	20	11	+9	22	Qualified to the Promotion group
4	Bukovyna Chernivtsi	14	5	5	4	11	11	0	20	Qualified to the Promotion group
5	Nyva Ternopil	14	4	4	6	13	17	−4	16 (Note: Head-to-head points: Nyva 4, Mynai 1)	Qualified to the Relegation group
6	Mynai	14	4	4	6	12	20	−8	16	Qualified to the Relegation group
7	Prykarpattia Ivano-Frankivsk	14	3	4	7	14	18	−4	13	Qualified to the Relegation group
8	Podillia Khmelnytskyi	14	1	5	8	9	19	−10	8	Qualified to the Relegation group
-	Khust	0	0	0	0	0	0	0	0	Withdrawn and record annulled

Updated to match(es) played on 23 November 2024. Source: PFL.ua
Rules for classification: 1) Points; 2) Head-to-head points; 3) Head-to-head goal difference; 4) Head-to-head goals scored; 5) Goal difference in all games; 6) Goals scored in all games (Note: calculation by criteria indicated in rules 2, 3, 4 is conducted with consideration of all teams that have an equal number of tournament points at the moment of calculation and not only among those which after preliminary criteria have appeared more successful).

==== Group B ====
Pos	Team	Pld	W	D	L	GF	GA	GD	Pts	Promotion, qualification or relegation
1	Kudrivka	16	9	4	3	22	12	+10	31	Qualified to the Promotion group
2	Metalist 1925 Kharkiv	16	8	5	3	21	10	+11	29	Qualified to the Promotion group
3	Poltava	16	8	5	3	24	14	+10	29	Qualified to the Promotion group
4	UCSA Tarasivka	16	8	4	4	31	21	+10	28	Qualified to the Promotion group
5	Viktoriya Sumy	16	6	5	5	23	12	+11	23	Qualified to the Relegation group
6	Mariupol	16	5	3	8	17	23	−6	18	Qualified to the Relegation group
7	Metalurh Zaporizhzhia	16	4	5	7	15	22	−7	17	Qualified to the Relegation group
8	Dinaz Vyshhorod	16	3	4	9	12	28	−16	13	Qualified to the Relegation group
9	Kremin Kremenchuk	16	2	3	11	9	32	−23	9	Qualified to the Relegation group

Source: PFL.ua
Rules for classification: 1) Points; 2) Head-to-head points; 3) Head-to-head goal difference; 4) Head-to-head goals scored; 5) Goal difference in all games; 6) Goals scored in all games (Note: calculation by criteria indicated in rules 2, 3, 4 is conducted with consideration of all teams that have an equal number of tournament points at the moment of calculation and not only among those which after preliminary criteria have appeared more successful).

==== Promotion group ====
Pos	Team	Pld	W	D	L	GF	GA	GD	Pts	Promotion, qualification or relegation
1	Epitsentr Kamianets-Podilskyi (C, P)	22	16	5	1	39	15	+24	53	Promotion to Ukrainian Premier League
2	Poltava (P)	22	12	5	5	31	19	+12	41	Promotion to Ukrainian Premier League
3	Metalist 1925 Kharkiv (O, P)	22	10	6	6	29	20	+9	36	Qualification to promotion play-offs
4	Kudrivka (O, P)	22	10	5	7	25	18	+7	35	Qualification to promotion play-offs
5	Ahrobiznes Volochysk	22	10	3	9	19	26	−7	33	
6	Metalist Kharkiv	22	8	7	7	29	21	+8	31	
7	Bukovyna Chernivtsi	22	8	6	8	20	20	0	30	
8	UCSA Tarasivka	22	7	6	9	33	35	−2	27	

Source: PFL.ua
Rules for classification: 1) Points; 2) Head-to-head points; 3) Head-to-head goal difference; 4) Head-to-head goals scored; 5) Goal difference in all games; 6) Goals scored in all games (Note: calculation by criteria indicated in rules 2, 3, 4 is conducted with consideration of all teams that have an equal number of tournament points at the moment of calculation and not only among those which after preliminary criteria have appeared more successful).
(C) Champions; (O) Play-off winners; (P) Promoted

==== Relegation group ====
Pos	Team	Pld	W	D	L	GF	GA	GD	Pts	Promotion, qualification or relegation
9	Viktoriya Sumy	24	9	9	6	32	17	+15	36	
10	Prykarpattia Ivano-Frankivsk	24	8	8	8	32	28	+4	32 (Note: Head-to-head goal difference: Prykarpattia +2, Nyva -2)	
11	Nyva Ternopil	24	8	8	8	28	27	+1	32	
12	Mynai	24	8	6	10	26	30	−4	30	Withdrawn after the season
13	Feniks-Mariupol (Note: The UAF Control and Disciplinary Committee spared FC Mariupol despite two no-shows during the season.)	24	8	4	12	26	34	−8	28	
14	Metalurh Zaporizhzhia	24	6	8	10	24	35	−11	26	Qualification to relegation play-off
15	Podillya Khmelnytskyi (O)	24	5	9	10	22	28	−6	24	Qualification to relegation play-off
16	Dinaz Vyshhorod (R)	24	3	8	13	19	46	−27	17	Relegation to Ukrainian Second League
17	Kremin Kremenchuk (R)	24	3	5	16	14	45	−31	14	Withdrawn after relegation
-	Khust (Note: FC Khust has withdrawn during the first stage and technically was not part of the relegation tournament.)	0	0	0	0	0	0	0	0	Withdrawn during the first stage of the tournament

Source: PFL.ua
Rules for classification: 1) Points; 2) Head-to-head points; 3) Head-to-head goal difference; 4) Head-to-head goals scored; 5) Goal difference in all games; 6) Goals scored in all games (Note: calculation by criteria indicated in rules 2, 3, 4 is conducted with consideration of all teams that have an equal number of tournament points at the moment of calculation and not only among those which after preliminary criteria have appeared more successful).
(O) Play-off winners; (R) Relegated

==== Relegation play-offs ====
The relegation–promotion play-off games are scheduled to take place between the 6th (14th) and 7th (15th) placed teams in the Relegation group of the First League with the second and third placed teams of the Second League.

In the Second League play-offs, the two group winners (A and B) square off for the Second League final, with a winner being granted direct promotion. At the same time, the losing team qualifies for the First League relegation play-off stage with the First League teams. Simultaneously, the two group runners-up (2nd placings in each group) face each other to determine the season's third-place team (small final), which would qualify for the First League relegation play-off stage with the First League teams as well, while the losing team is eliminated. On 6 May 2025, the PFL held a draw to identify and confirm which teams would play against teams from another league. The Second League teams play their first game at home.

This was the fourth time Metalurh Zaporizhzhia qualified for the post-season play-offs.

Second League play-offs
Final
B1	Kolos-2 Kovalivka	0	3	3
A1	Probiy Horodenka (p)	1	2	3
Third place
B2	FC Chernihiv	3	1	4
A3	Skala 1911 Stryi	2	0	2

First League relegation play-offs
2L	Kolos-2 Kovalivka	0	0	0
15	Podillya Khmelnytskyi	2	1	3
2L	FC Chernihiv	3	2	5
14	Metalurh Zaporizhzhia	0	0	0

Second League teams	Agg.	First League teams	1st leg	2nd leg
Kolos-2 Kovalivka	0 – 3	Podillya Khmelnytskyi	0–2	0–1
FC Chernihiv	5 – 0	Metalurh Zaporizhzhia	3–0	2–0

=== First Semi-final ===
4 June 2025	Kolos-2 Kovalivka	0–2	Podillya Khmelnytskyi	Bucha, Kyiv Oblast
12:00		Report	Balan 19'; Shkinder 48'	Stadium: Stadium Yuvileinyi; Attendance: 0 Referee: Ihor Stashuk

8 June 2025	Podillya Khmelnytskyi	1–0	Kolos-2 Kovalivka	Khmelnytskyi
12:00	Veremiyenko 58'	Report		Stadium: Podillia; Referee: Andriy Likarenko

Podillya Khmelnytskyi won 3–0 on aggregate.

=== Second Semi-final ===
8 June 2025	FC Chernihiv	3–0	Metalurh Zaporizhzhia	Chernihiv
13:00	Shalfeyev 15'; Bezghubchenko 43'; Romanchenko 81' (p)	Report	Kostyuchenko (yellow card) 78' (yellow-red card) 80'	Stadium: Chernihiv Arena; Attendance: 0 Referee: Maksym Firsov

12 June 2025	Metalurh Zaporizhzhia	0–2	FC Chernihiv	Zaporizhzhia
12:00		Report	Koydan 63'; Shumylo 84'	Stadium: Slavutych Arena; Attendance: 0 Referee: Yevhen Tsybulko

FC Chernihiv won 5–0 on aggregate. Metalurh Zaporizhia avoided relegation after withdrawal of FC Mynai.

=== PFL League 2 (Second League) ===
==== Group A ====
Pos	Team	Pld	W	D	L	GF	GA	GD	Pts	Promotion, qualification or relegation
1	Probiy Horodenka	18	13	2	3	42	15	+27	41	Qualification to the league's title play-off
2	Rukh-2 Lviv	18	10	3	5	29	19	+10	33 (Note: Head-to-head goal difference: Rukh-2 +2, Skala 1911 -2)	Withdrawn after the season
3	Skala 1911 Stryi	18	10	3	5	31	18	+13	33	Qualification to the third place play-off
4	Kulykiv-Bilka	18	9	4	5	27	17	+10	31	
5	Polissya-2 Zhytomyr	18	9	2	7	33	21	+12	29	
6	Uzhhorod	18	7	5	6	26	25	+1	26	
7	Vilkhivtsi	18	5	4	9	20	29	−9	19	
8	Sambir-Nyva-2 Ternopil	18	5	3	10	15	30	−15	18	
9	Revera 1908 Ivano-Frankivsk	18	3	5	10	15	33	−18	14	Withdrawn after the season
10	Real Pharma Odesa	18	2	3	13	9	40	−31	9	

Source: PFL.ua
Rules for classification: 1) Points; 2) Head-to-head points; 3) Head-to-head goal difference; 4) Head-to-head goals scored; 5) Goal difference in all games; 6) Goals scored in all games (Note: calculation by criteria indicated in rules 2, 3, 4 is conducted with consideration of all teams that have equal number of tournament points at the moment of calculation and not only among those which after preliminary criteria have appeared more successful).

==== Group B ====
Pos	Team	Pld	W	D	L	GF	GA	GD	Pts	Promotion, qualification or relegation
1	Kolos-2 Kovalivka	18	12	3	3	30	14	+16	39	Qualification to the league's title play-off
2	Chernihiv	18	11	5	2	30	8	+22	38	Qualification to the third place play-off
3	Lokomotyv Kyiv	18	9	3	6	22	21	+1	30	Qualification to the third place play-off
4	Oleksandriya-2	18	7	7	4	30	19	+11	28	
5	Hirnyk-Sport Horishni Plavni	18	8	2	8	19	20	−1	26	
6	Trostianets	18	5	7	6	20	16	+4	22	
7	Chaika Petropavlivska Borshchahivka	18	4	7	7	15	21	−6	19	
8	Metalist 1925-2 Kharkiv	18	5	3	10	23	39	−16	18	Withdrawn after the season
9	Nyva Vinnytsia	18	5	1	12	14	26	−12	16	
10	Vorskla-2 Poltava	18	3	4	11	15	34	−19	13	Withdrawn after the season

Source: PFL.ua
Rules for classification: 1) Points; 2) Head-to-head points; 3) Head-to-head goal difference; 4) Head-to-head goals scored; 5) Goal difference in all games; 6) Goals scored in all games (Note: calculation by criteria indicated in rules 2, 3, 4 is conducted with consideration of all teams that have equal number of tournament points at the moment of calculation and not only among those which after preliminary criteria have appeared more successful).

==== The league's play-offs ====
The winner of the league's title play-off gains direct promotion to the 2025–26 Ukrainian First League. The finalists of the league's title play-off and the winner of the third-place play-off gain qualification to the promotional play-offs. On 30 April 2025, a draw was held for the Second League playoffs, including for the title and the third place. The first leg is expected to take place on 23 May, while the second leg is on 30 May. On 21 May 2025, the PFL Central Council decided that the play-off match-up between Chernihiv and Rukh-2 will not take place since Rukh-2 Lviv withdrew. Also, the council reviewed propositions to provide an extra chance to Skala 1911 Stryi, but they were less popular. On 22 May 2025, the Ukrainian Association of Football Executive Committee published its decision about the situation by making changes and allowing third-placed teams from both groups to play each other to determine the opponent for FC Chernihiv.

League's final

League's title
B1	Kolos-2 Kovalivka	0	3	3
A1	Probiy Horodenka (p)	1	2	3

Team 1	Agg.	Team 2	1st leg	2nd leg
Kolos-2 Kovalivka	3 – 3 (3 – 4 p)	Probiy Horodenka	0–1	3–2

23 May 2025	Kolos-2 Kovalivka	0–1	Probiy Horodenka	Kovalivka, Kyiv Oblast
14:00		Report	Kharuk 39'	Stadium: Kolos; Attendance: 228; Referee: Artem Artemenko

30 May 2025	Probiy Horodenka	2–3 (a.e.t.) (4–3 p)	Kolos-2 Kovalivka	Horodenka, Ivano-Frankivsk Oblast
13:30	Felipovych 37'; Orynchak 65'	Report	Holovkin 73'; Kolesnyk 82'; Shevchuk 90+1'	Stadium: Probiy Arena; Referee: Stepan Lapko
	Penalties
	Bilyi (penalty missed); Felipovych (penalty scored); Sondey (penalty scored); Radulskyi (penalty scored); Orynchak (penalty scored)		(penalty scored) Holovkin; (penalty scored) Pomazan; (penalty scored) Kolesnyk; (penalty missed) Kanayev; (penalty missed) Nedolya

3–3 on aggregate; Probiy Horodenka won 4–3 on penalties.

Third place

For two-legged ties, the team listed above in the bracket hosted the first match. The third score is the match aggregate.

- Extra play-off
- single match

- Third-place final
- two-legged tie

B2
FC Chernihiv
3
1
4

B3
Lokomotyv Kyiv
—
—
1

A3
Skala 1911 Stryi
2
0
2

A3
Skala 1911 Stryi
—
—
4

Team 1	Score	Team 2
Lokomotyv Kyiv	1–4	Skala 1911 Stryi

26 May 2025	Lokomotyv Kyiv	1–4	Skala 1911 Stryi	Boryspil, Kyiv Oblast
13:00	Romanchuk 51'	Report	Sahaidak 7'; Lisovyk 12'; Hora 26'; Kravchenko 76'	Stadium: Kolos; Attendance: 0 Referee: Dmytro Osaulenko

Team 1	Agg.	Team 2	1st leg	2nd leg
Chernihiv	4–2	Skala 1911 Stryi	3–2	0–1

30 May 2025	FC Chernihiv	3–2	Skala 1911 Stryi	Chernihiv
	Porokhnya 21'; Koydan 30'; Kulyk 90+5'	Report	Lisovyk 56', 82'	Stadium: Chernihiv Arena; Attendance: 180; Referee: Anatoliy Ukhov

4 June 2025	Skala 1911 Stryi	0–1	FC Chernihiv	Stryi, Lviv Oblast
		Report	Novikov 8'	Stadium: Sokil

FC Chernihiv won 4–2 on aggregate.

=== Cup competitions ===
==== Ukrainian Cup ====
14 May 2025

Shakhtar Donetsk (PL)	1–1 (a.e.t.)	(PL) Dynamo Kyiv
Kauã 64'	Report	Yarmolenko 43'
Penalties
Nazaryna (penalty scored); Alisson (penalty scored); Kevin (penalty scored); Kauã (penalty scored); Ghram (penalty scored); Kryskiv (penalty scored)	6–5	(penalty scored) Vanat; (penalty scored) Brazhko; (penalty scored) Vivcharenko; (penalty scored) Mykhailenko; (penalty scored) Pikhalyonok; (penalty missed) Karavayev

Tsentralnyi, Zhytomyr
Referee: Mykola Balakin (Kyiv Oblast)

== Women's club football ==
Promoted	Relegated
Sisters Odesa; Obolon Kyiv; Polissya Zhytomyr	Mariupol; Veres Rivne; ~~Dynamo Kyiv~~; ~~Dnipro-1~~

Note: For the scratched clubs, see section Clubs removed for more details

=== Vyshcha Liha ===
Pos	Team	Pld	W	D	L	GF	GA	GD	Pts	Qualification or relegation
1	Vorskla Poltava	10	9	1	0	41	0	+41	28	Qualification for the Championship Group
2	Kolos Kovalivka	10	9	0	1	39	3	+36	27	Qualification for the Championship Group
3	Metalist 1925 Kharkiv	10	7	2	1	34	6	+28	23	Qualification for the Championship Group
4	Seasters Odesa	10	7	1	2	24	8	+16	22	Qualification for the Championship Group
5	Shakhtar Donetsk	10	4	2	4	16	16	0	14	Qualification for the Championship Group
6	Ladomyr Volodymyr	10	3	2	5	16	19	−3	11	Qualification for the Championship Group
7	Kryvbas Kryvyi Rih	10	3	1	6	12	20	−8	10	Qualification for the Relegation Group
8	Pantery Uman	10	2	1	7	7	40	−33	7 (Note: Head-to-head points: Pantery 4, Polissia 3, EMS-Podillia 1)	Qualification for the Relegation Group
9	Polissia Zhytomyr	10	2	1	7	15	32	−17	7	Qualification for the Relegation Group
10	EMS Podillia Vinnytsia	10	2	1	7	6	39	−33	7	Qualification for the Relegation Group
11	Obolon Kyiv	10	0	2	8	6	33	−27	2	Qualification for the Relegation Group
12	Dnipro-1	0	0	0	0	0	0	0	0	Withdrew

Source: womensfootball.com.ua
Rules for classification: 1) Points; 2) Head-to-head points; 3) Head-to-head goal difference; 4) Head-to-head goals scored; 5) Goal difference; 6) Goals scored.
Notes:

Pos	Team	Pld	W	D	L	GF	GA	GD	Pts	
1	Vorskla Poltava (C)	20	16	4	0	63	2	+61	52	Qualification for Champions League second qualifying round
2	Metalist 1925 Kharkiv	20	15	4	1	62	7	+55	49	Qualification for Champions League first qualifying round
3	Kolos Kovalivka	20	14	1	5	55	13	+42	43	Qualification for Europa Cup first qualifying round
4	Seasters Odesa	20	10	1	9	35	26	+9	31	
5	Shakhtar Donetsk	20	7	3	10	25	36	−11	24	
6	Ladomyr Volodymyr	20	3	3	14	17	55	−38	12	

Source: womensfootball.com.ua
Rules for classification: 1) Points; 2) Head-to-head points; 3) Head-to-head goal difference; 4) Head-to-head goals scored; 5) Goal difference; 6) Goals scored.
(C) Champions

Pos	Team	Pld	W	D	L	GF	GA	GD	Pts	
7	Kryvbas Kryvyi Rih	18	10	1	7	39	30	+9	31	
8	Polissia Zhytomyr	18	7	2	9	46	45	+1	23	
9	Pantery Uman	18	7	1	10	17	57	−40	22	
10	Obolon Kyiv	18	2	3	13	11	43	−32	9	Withdrew after the season
11	EMS-Podillia Vinnytsia	18	2	1	15	13	69	−56	7	

Source: womensfootball.com.ua
Rules for classification: 1) Points; 2) Head-to-head points; 3) Head-to-head goal difference; 4) Head-to-head goals scored; 5) Goal difference; 6) Goals scored.

== Managerial changes ==
This is a list of managerial changes among Ukrainian professional football clubs:

Team	Outgoing manager	Manner of departure	Date of vacancy	Table	Incoming manager	Date of appointment
				Pre-season		

== Clubs removed ==
- Dnipro-1 (all teams were removed right before the start of the season)
- Kudrivka-Nyva (completed merger with Kudrivka)
- Druzhba Myrivka
- Zviahel
- Vast Mykolaiv
- Dynamo Kyiv (women team)
