= 2024–25 Ukrainian Second League =

Ukrainian Second League
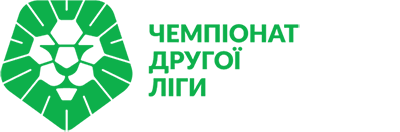
- Season: 2024–25
- Dates: 7 August 2024 – 17 May 2025 (winter break: 6 November 2024 – 10 April 2025)
- Champions: Probiy Horodenka
- Promoted: Probiy Horodenka; Chernihiv
- Relegated: Rukh-2 Lviv; Revera 1908 Ivano-Frankivsk; Vorskla-2 Poltava; Metalist 1925-2 Kharkiv
- Matches: 180
- Goals: 465 (2.58 per match)
- Top goalscorer: Bohdan Orynchak (Probiy Horodenka) (11 goals)
- Biggest home win: Chernihiv 8–2 Metalist 1925-2 (Round 1)
- Biggest away win: Real Pharma 0–7 Skala 1911 (Round 18)
- Highest scoring: Chernihiv 8–2 Metalist 1925-2 (Round 1)
- Longest winning run: Kolos-2 Kovalivka; Probiy Horodenka (7 games each)
- Longest unbeaten run: Kolos-2 Kovalivka (11 games)
- Longest winless run: Vorskla-2 (13 games each)
- Longest losing run: Metalist 1925-2; Vorskla-2 (7 games each)
- Highest attendance: 425; Sambir-Nyva-2 vs Kulykiv-Bilka (Round 6)
- Lowest attendance: 0 - 56 game(s) (attendance restrictions)
- Total attendance: 12,287
- Average attendance: 207
- All statistics correct as of 18 May 2024. Play-off statistics are not included

The 2024–25 Ukrainian Second League was the 34th since its establishment.

The competition started on 7 August 2024 and was scheduled to pause for a winter intermission on 27 October after Round 12, but was extended due to Russian hostilities of the ongoing Russo-Ukrainian War. The last 6 rounds of the competition were scheduled to be played in the following spring. Due to regular airstrikes by the Russian Armed Forces, restrictions were implemented for attendance, with many games being played without spectators.

For the winter break, both second teams of Rukh-2 (Group A, Rukh Lviv) and Kolos-2 (Group B, Kolos Kovalivka) finished at the top of their respective groups. On 29 October 2024, the PFL announced that during the winter break on initiative of separate clubs from the Second League it has organized an invitational friendly tournament starting 2 November 2024 and finishing around 30 November 2024.

== Teams ==
=== Promoted teams ===
One team of the 2021–22 Ukrainian First League was readmitted to professional competitions:

- FC Uzhhorod – (returning after three years absence, based on FCI Uzhhorod)

Four teams have been promoted from the 2023–24 Ukrainian Football Amateur League:

- SC Vilkhivtsi – 8th place of Group 1 (debut)
- FC Kulykiv-Bilka – 1st place of Group 1 (debut)
- Probiy Horodenka – 5th place of Group 1 (debut)
- Revera 1908 Ivano-Frankivsk – 11th place of Group 1 (debut, based on the FAFP academy)

Eight second teams have been added:

- Sambir-Nyva-2 Ternopil – (debut, based on FC Sambir)
- Polissya-2 Zhytomyr – (debut)
- Vorskla-2 Poltava – (returning, last competed in the 2004–05 season)
- Kolos-2 Kovalivka – (debut, based on Shturm Ivankiv)
- Oleksandriya-2 – (debut)
- Metalist 1925-2 Kharkiv – (debut, based on Metalist 1925 (U-19))
- Veres-Izotop-2 Varash – (debut, based on Izotop Varash)
- Livyi Bereh-2 Kyiv – (debut)

=== Relegated teams ===
Two teams were relegated from the 2023–24 Ukrainian First League.

- Chernihiv – 19th placed (returning, after two seasons)
- Hirnyk-Sport Horishni Plavni – 20th placed (returning, after 10 seasons)

=== Expelled and withdrawn teams ===
- Veres-Izotop-2 Varash - the club management refused to participate in the competition due to the lack of proper safety measures
- Livyi Bereh-2 Kyiv – Livyi Bereh Kyiv withdrew its second squad after its senior team gained promotion to the Ukrainian Premier League.
- Rukh-2 Lviv – Rukh Lviv announced that it withdraws its second team immediately following the conclusion of the regular league competition and will not participate in the playoffs. Due to the withdrawal of the Rukh reserves that placed second, changes were made to the promotional play-offs by allowing third-placed teams to compete as well.

=== Location map and stadiums ===
Home venues of teams in the 2024–25 Ukrainian Second League
— Group A — Group B

==== Stadiums ====
Group A

Team	Stadium (Note: Minimum capacity of stadium for the Second League is 500 spectators.)	Position in 2023–24
Skala 1911 Stryi	Sokil	6th
Rukh-2 Lviv	imeni Markevycha, Vynnyky	9th
Real Pharma Odesa	Ivan	12th
Kulykiv-Bilka	Arena Kulykiv	AM
Probiy Horodenka	Probiy Arena	AM
Vilkhivtsi	Vilkhivtsi Arena	AM
Revera 1908 Ivano-Frankivsk	imeni Hemby	AM
Uzhhorod	Avanhard	—
Sambir-Nyva-2 Ternopil	imeni Brovarskoho, Sambir	—
Polissya-2 Zhytomyr	club's training field, Hlybochytsia	—

Group B

Team	Stadium	Position in 2023–24
Chernihiv	Yunist Stadium, Chernihiv Arena	1L
Hirnyk-Sport Horishni Plavni	Yunist	1L
Chaika	Tsentralnyi imeni Brukvenka, Makariv	4th
Nyva Vinnytsia	Nyva training base	8th
Lokomotyv Kyiv	imeni Bannikova	10th
Trostianets	imeni Kutsa	11th
Vorskla-2 Poltava	Ltava	—
Kolos-2 Kovalivka	Yuvileinyi, Bucha	—
Metalist 1925-2 Kharkiv	Kolos, Boryspil	—
Oleksandriya-2	Nika Olimp	—

Notes:

- [—] – The dash sign indicates that the club was admitted to the Second League without participation in the AAFU championship last season.
- 1L – indicates participants of the 2023–24 Ukrainian First League
- Am – indicates participants of the 2023–24 AAFU championship

== Managers ==
Club	Head coach	Replaced coach
Chaika Petropavlivska Borshchahivka	Ihor Lutsenko	
Chernihiv	Valeriy Chornyi	
Hirnyk-Sport Horishni Plavni	Valeriy Kutsenko	
Kulykiv-Bilka	Serhiy Atlasyuk	Bohdan Kostyk
Kolos-2 Kovalivka	Volodymyr Bondarenko	
Lokomotyv Kyiv	Nazar Kozak (acting)	Vadym Lazorenko
Metalist 1925-2 Kharkiv	Serhiy Karpenko	Maksym Tsvirenko (Note: The first game of the season Metalist 1925-2 was led by an acting manager Serhiy Volvakov)
Nyva Vinnytsia	Yuriy Yaroshenko	
Sambir-Nyva-2 Ternopil	Roman Marych	Serhiy Laktionov
Oleksandriya-2	Viktor Bytsiura	
Polissya-2 Zhytomyr	Kishan Hautam	
Probiy Horodenka	Volodymyr Kovalyuk	
Real Pharma Odesa	Valentyn Poltavets (caretaker)	Andriy Parkhomenko
Revera 1908 Ivano-Frankivsk	Yaroslav Matviiv	
Rukh-2 Lviv	Ivan Fedyk	
Skala 1911 Stryi	Roman Hnativ	Mykhailo Basarab Stepan Matviyiv
Trostianets	Yuriy Bakalov	
Uzhhorod	Yaromyr Loboda	
Vilkhivtsi	Oleksiy Zorin (Note: Before the winter intermission there appeared information that the Vilkhivtsi head coach resigned, but later it was clarified that the club's president did not accept his resignation.)	
Vorskla-2 Poltava	Vyacheslav Nivinskyi	Iya Andrushchak

=== Managerial changes ===
Team	Outgoing head coach	Manner of departure	Date of vacancy	Table	Incoming head coach	Date of appointment
Kolos-2 Kovalivka	new team			Pre-season	Volodymyr Bondarenko	13 June 2024
Metalist 1925-2 Kharkiv	new team			Pre-season	Serhiy Karpenko	13 June 2024
Polissya-2 Zhytomyr	new team			Pre-season	Kishan Hautam	13 June 2024
Vorskla-2 Poltava	new team			Pre-season	Iya Andrushchak	13 June 2024
Oleksandriya-2	new team			Pre-season	Viktor Bytsiura	14 June 2024
Rukh-2 Lviv	Volodymyr Bezubyak	Change of role	28 June 2024	Pre-season	Ivan Fedyk	28 June 2024
Sambir-Nyva-2 Ternopil	new team			Pre-season	Serhiy Laktionov	20 July 2024
Metalist 1925-2 Kharkiv	Serhiy Karpenko	Change of role	28 July 2024	Pre-season	Maksym Tsvirenko	29 July 2024
FC Uzhhorod	new team			Pre-season	Yaromyr Loboda	2 August 2024
Chaika Petropavlivska Borshchahivka	Serhiy Syzykhin	Left for Chonomorets	6 August 2024	Pre-season	Ihor Lutsenko	7 August 2024
Metalist 1925-2 Kharkiv	Maksym Tsvirenko	became assistant to van Leeuwen	20 August 2024	10th (Group B)	Serhiy Karpenko	20 August 2024
Skala 1911 Stryi	Mykhailo Basarab	Sacked	19 September 2024	6th (Group A)	Stepan Matviyiv	19 September 2024
Real Pharma Odesa	Andriy Parkhomenko	Resigned	27 September 2024	10th (Group A)	Valentyn Poltavets (caretaker)	27 September 2024
Skala 1911 Stryi	Stepan Matviyiv	Mutual consent	3 November 2024	5th (Group A)	Mykola Vasylyshyn (caretaker)	2 November 2024
Skala 1911 Stryi	Mykola Vasylyshyn (caretaker)	Change of role	10 November 2024	5th (Group A)	Roman Hnativ (caretaker)	10 November 2024
Skala 1911 Stryi	Roman Hnativ (caretaker)	Change of role	14 February 2025	5th (Group A)	Roman Hnativ	14 February 2025
Vorskla-2 Poltava	Iya Andrushchak	Change of role Vorskla (women)	15 January 2025	10th (Group B)	Vyacheslav Nivinskyi	15 January 2025
Lokomotyv Kyiv	Vadym Lazorenko	Dismissed	5 May 2025	5th (Group B)	Nazar Kozak (acting)	5 May 2025
Kulykiv-Bilka	Bohdan Kostyk	Dismissed	19 May 2025	4th (Group A)	Serhiy Atlasyuk	22 May 2025

== Group A league table ==
Pos	Team	Pld	W	D	L	GF	GA	GD	Pts	Promotion, qualification or relegation
1	Probiy Horodenka	18	13	2	3	42	15	+27	41	Qualification to the league's title play-off
2	Rukh-2 Lviv	18	10	3	5	29	19	+10	33 (Note: Head-to-head goal difference: Rukh-2 +2, Skala 1911 -2)	Withdrawn after the season
3	Skala 1911 Stryi	18	10	3	5	31	18	+13	33	Qualification to the third place play-off
4	Kulykiv-Bilka	18	9	4	5	27	17	+10	31	
5	Polissya-2 Zhytomyr	18	9	2	7	33	21	+12	29	
6	Uzhhorod	18	7	5	6	26	25	+1	26	
7	Vilkhivtsi	18	5	4	9	20	29	−9	19	
8	Sambir-Nyva-2 Ternopil	18	5	3	10	15	30	−15	18	
9	Revera 1908 Ivano-Frankivsk	18	3	5	10	15	33	−18	14	Withdrawn after the season
10	Real Pharma Odesa	18	2	3	13	9	40	−31	9	

Source: PFL.ua
Rules for classification: 1) Points; 2) Head-to-head points; 3) Head-to-head goal difference; 4) Head-to-head goals scored; 5) Goal difference in all games; 6) Goals scored in all games (Note: calculation by criteria indicated in rules 2, 3, 4 is conducted with consideration of all teams that have equal number of tournament points at the moment of calculation and not only among those which after preliminary criteria have appeared more successful).

=== Group A results ===
Home \ Away	KUL	NT2	PZ2	PRO	SKL	REV	RPO	RL2	UZH	VLX
Kulykiv-Bilka		3–0	3–0	1–3	1–2	4–1	3–0	4–0	2–1	1–1
Sambir-Nyva-2 Ternopil	0–1		2–1	1–6	0–0	0–1	2–0	0–1	1–1	3–1
Polissya-2 Zhytomyr	1–2	4–1		1–0	0–0	4–1	2–0	0–2	4–1	3–0
Probiy Horodenka	2–0	3–0	3–1		2–0	3–0	1–0	2–3	5–1	1–0
Skala 1911 Stryi	2–0	1–2	1–0	4–2		2–0	3–1	0–3	0–2	2–2
Revera 1908 Ivano-Frankivsk	0–0	0–1	1–0	1–1	1–3		1–1	0–2	1–5	1–1
Real Pharma Odesa	0–0	2–1	1–2	0–3	0–7	0–3		0–0	0–1	0–4
Rukh-2 Lviv	1–1	3–0	2–4	0–2	1–2	2–1	2–0		3–0	2–0
Uzhhorod	0–1	0–0	1–1	1–1	0–2	2–0	4–2	2–2		1–0
Vilkhivtsi	3–0	2–1	0–5	1–2	1–0	2–2	1–2	1–0	0–3	

Source: pfl.ua (in Ukrainian)
Legend: Blue = home team win; Yellow = draw; Red = away team win.

Additional notes:

=== Group A results by week ===
Team ╲ Round	1	2	3	4	5	6	7	8	9	10	11	12	13	14	15	16	17	18
Kulykiv-Bilka	W	L	W	L	W	W	D	W	D	W	L	D	L	D	W	L	W	W
Sambir-Nyva-2 Ternopil	D	W	L	L	W	L	D	L	L	W	L	L	W	L	L	D	L	W
Polissya-2 Zhytomyr	L	W	W	W	D	L	W	W	W	L	D	L	W	L	W	L	W	L
Probiy Horodenka	W	W	W	W	D	L	L	W	D	W	W	W	W	W	W	W	L	W
Revera 1908 Ivano-Frankivsk	W	L	L	L	L	W	L	D	D	D	W	D	L	L	L	L	D	L
Real Pharma Odesa	L	L	L	W	L	L	L	L	L	D	L	W	L	D	L	D	L	L
Rukh-2 Lviv	D	L	L	W	W	W	W	W	D	W	W	W	L	W	L	D	W	L
Skala 1911 Stryi	D	W	W	L	D	L	W	L	W	L	W	L	W	W	D	W	W	W
Uzhhorod	D	L	L	W	D	W	D	L	W	L	D	W	W	L	W	D	L	W
Vilkhivtsi	L	W	W	L	L	W	D	D	L	L	L	L	L	W	D	W	D	L

Source: pfl.ua
W = Win; D = Draw; L = Loss

=== Group A goalscorers ===
As of 17 May 2025

Rank	Scorer	Team	Goals (Pen.)
1	Bohdan Orynchak	Probiy Horodenka	13 (1)
2	Dmytro Kovalenko	FC Uzhhorod	8 (0)
3	5 player(s)		5
8	9 player(s)		4
17	17 player(s)		3
34	24 player(s)		2
58	63 player(s)		1

=== Group A clean sheets ===
As of 23 April 2025

Rank	Player	Club	Clean sheets
1	Roman Serdyuk	Probiy Horodenka	8

== Group B league table ==
Pos	Team	Pld	W	D	L	GF	GA	GD	Pts	Promotion, qualification or relegation
1	Kolos-2 Kovalivka	18	12	3	3	30	14	+16	39	Qualification to the league's title play-off
2	Chernihiv	18	11	5	2	30	8	+22	38	Qualification to the third place play-off
3	Lokomotyv Kyiv	18	9	3	6	22	21	+1	30	Qualification to the third place play-off
4	Oleksandriya-2	18	7	7	4	30	19	+11	28	
5	Hirnyk-Sport Horishni Plavni	18	8	2	8	19	20	−1	26	
6	Trostianets	18	5	7	6	20	16	+4	22	
7	Chaika Petropavlivska Borshchahivka	18	4	7	7	15	21	−6	19	
8	Metalist 1925-2 Kharkiv	18	5	3	10	23	39	−16	18	Withdrawn after the season
9	Nyva Vinnytsia	18	5	1	12	14	26	−12	16	
10	Vorskla-2 Poltava	18	3	4	11	15	34	−19	13	Withdrawn after the season

Source: PFL.ua
Rules for classification: 1) Points; 2) Head-to-head points; 3) Head-to-head goal difference; 4) Head-to-head goals scored; 5) Goal difference in all games; 6) Goals scored in all games (Note: calculation by criteria indicated in rules 2, 3, 4 is conducted with consideration of all teams that have equal number of tournament points at the moment of calculation and not only among those which after preliminary criteria have appeared more successful).

=== Group B results ===
Home \ Away	CPB	CHE	HIS	KK2	LOK	MX2	NYV	OL2	TRO	VP2
Chaika Petropavlivska Borshchahivka		0–1	0–1	0–0	0–2	1–1	2–1	2–2	1–0	1–0
Chernihiv	0–0		1–2	2–0	1–1	8–2	2–0	0–0	0–0	4–0
Hirnyk-Sport Horishni Plavni	2–1	1–2		0–1	1–0	3–2	1–0	1–2	0–0	2–2
Kolos-2 Kovalivka	1–1	1–0	2–0		3–1	5–2	2–1	1–1	3–0	2–0
Lokomotyv Kyiv	2–0	0–3	1–0	1–3		0–0	3–0	0–3	1–0	2–3
Metalist 1925-2 Kharkiv	0–3	0–2	2–0	1–3	2–3		1–0	1–2	0–3	3–1
Nyva Vinnytsia	2–1	0–1	0–2	2–0	0–1	3–2		0–2	0–0	3–0
Oleksandriya-2	4–0	1–2	2–1	0–2	2–2	0–1	4–0		2–2	1–1
Trostianets	1–1	0–0	1–0	2–0 (Note: The match that was supposed to take place on September 7 was suspended due to extended air siren. The game was rescheduled and took place on 2 November 2024.)	0–1	1–2 (Note: The match that was supposed to take place on October 19 was suspended due to extended air siren. The game was rescheduled and took place on 6 November 2024.)	2–1	1–1		6–1
Vorskla-2 Poltava	1–1	0–1	1–2	0–1	0–1	1–1	0–1	2–1	2–1	

Source: pfl.ua (in Ukrainian)
Legend: Blue = home team win; Yellow = draw; Red = away team win.
Notes:

Additional notes:

=== Group B results by week ===
Team ╲ Round	1	2	3	4	5	6	7	8	9	10	11	12	13	14	15	16	17	18
Chaika Petropavlivska Borshchahivka	D	D	D	L	L	W	D	W	L	D	L	W	L	L	L	W	D	D
Chernihiv	W	D	W	D	W	D	W	D	L	W	W	L	W	W	D	W	W	W
Hirnyk-Sport Horishni Plavni	L	L	L	W	W	W	W	D	W	L	L	W	W	L	L	W	L	D
Kolos-2 Kovalivka	D	W	W	W	W	W	W	W	D	W	W	L	L	W	W	D	W	L
Lokomotyv Kyiv	L	D	L	D	W	L	W	W	W	W	L	L	L	W	W	D	W	W
Metalist 1925-2 Kharkiv	L	L	D	W	L	L	L	L	L	L	L	W	D	W	W	D	L	W
Nyva Vinnytsia	D	W	L	L	L	L	L	L	W	L	W	L	W	L	W	L	L	L
Oleksandriya-2	W	D	W	D	L	W	L	D	W	W	W	W	D	D	L	D	L	D
Trostianets	D	W	L	D	D	D	D	L	W	W	W	L	D	L	D	L	W	L
Vorskla-2 Poltava	W	L	W	L	W	L	L	L	L	L	L	L	D	D	L	L	D	D

Source: pfl.ua
W = Win; D = Draw; L = Loss

=== Group B top goalscorers ===
As of 18 May 2025

Rank	Scorer	Team	Goals (Pen.)
1	Yaroslav Bazayev	FC Oleksandriya-2	7 (5)
2	Ivan Romanchuk	Lokomotyv Kyiv	6 (0)
2	Vyacheslav Studenko	Hirnyk-Sport Horishni Plavni	6 (0)
4	5 player(s)		5
9	4 player(s)		4
13	14 player(s)		3
27	26 player(s)		2
53	53 player(s)		1

=== Group B clean sheets ===
As of 18 May 2025

Rank	Player	Club	Clean sheets
1	Maksym Tatarenko	Chernihiv	12

== The league's play-offs ==
The winner of the league's title play-off gains direct promotion to the 2025–26 Ukrainian First League. The finalists of the league's title play-off and the winner of the third-place play-off qualify for the promotional play-offs. On 30 April 2025, a draw was held for the Second League playoffs, including the title and third-place matches. The first leg was expected to take place on 23 May, while the second leg was expected to take place on 30 May.

On 21 May 2025, the PFL Central Council decided that the play-off match-up between Chernihiv and Rukh-2 will not take place, since Rukh-2 Lviv withdrew. Also, since Rukh-2 withdrew, the council reviewed a proposal from Skala 1911 Stryi to provide an extra chance for them, but Skala's proposal was not supported by the majority. On 22 May 2025, the Ukrainian Association of Football Executive Committee published its decision about the situation by making changes and allowing third-placed teams from both groups to play each other to determine the opponent for FC Chernihiv in place of Rukh-2.

League's final

League's title
B1	Kolos-2 Kovalivka	0	3	3
A1	Probiy Horodenka (p)	1	2	3

Team 1	Agg.	Team 2	1st leg	2nd leg
Kolos-2 Kovalivka	3 – 3 (3 – 4 p)	Probiy Horodenka	0–1	3–2

23 May 2025	Kolos-2 Kovalivka	0–1	Probiy Horodenka	Kovalivka, Kyiv Oblast
14:00		Report	Kharuk 39'	Stadium: Kolos; Attendance: 228; Referee: Artem Artemenko

30 May 2025	Probiy Horodenka	2–3 (a.e.t.) (4–3 p)	Kolos-2 Kovalivka	Horodenka, Ivano-Frankivsk Oblast
13:30	Felipovych 37'; Orynchak 65'	Report	Holovkin 73'; Kolesnyk 82'; Shevchuk 90+1'	Stadium: Probiy Arena; Referee: Stepan Lapko
	Penalties
	Bilyi (penalty missed); Felipovych (penalty scored); Sondey (penalty scored); Radulskyi (penalty scored); Orynchak (penalty scored)		(penalty scored) Holovkin; (penalty scored) Pomazan; (penalty scored) Kolesnyk; (penalty missed) Kanayev; (penalty missed) Nedolya

3–3 on aggregate; Probiy Horodenka won 4–3 on penalties.

Third place

For two-legged ties, the team listed above in the bracket hosted the first match. The third score is the match aggregate.

Preliminary round; single match
26 May – Boryspil
A3	Skala 1911 Stryi	4
B3	Lokomotyv Kyiv	1

Third-place final; two-legged tie
B2	FC Chernihiv	3	1	4
A3	Skala 1911 Stryi	2	0	2

Team 1	Score	Team 2
Lokomotyv Kyiv	1–4	Skala 1911 Stryi

26 May 2025	Lokomotyv Kyiv	1–4	Skala 1911 Stryi	Boryspil, Kyiv Oblast
13:00	Romanchuk 51'	Report	Sahaidak 7'; Lisovyk 12'; Hora 26'; Kravchenko 76'	Stadium: Kolos; Attendance: 0 Referee: Dmytro Osaulenko

Team 1	Agg.	Team 2	1st leg	2nd leg
Chernihiv	4–2	Skala 1911 Stryi	3–2	1–0

30 May 2025	FC Chernihiv	3–2	Skala 1911 Stryi	Chernihiv
	Porokhnya 21'; Koydan 30'; Kulyk 90+5'	Report	Lisovyk 56', 82'	Stadium: Chernihiv Arena; Attendance: 180; Referee: Anatoliy Ukhov

4 June 2025	Skala 1911 Stryi	0–1	FC Chernihiv	Stryi, Lviv Oblast
		Report	Novikov 8'	Stadium: Sokil

FC Chernihiv won 4–2 on aggregate.

=== The league's play-offs results ===
- 1st place – Probiy Horodenka, (direct promotion to the 2025–26 Ukrainian First League)
- 2nd place – Kolos-2 Kovalivka, (promotion play-offs)
- 3rd place – FC Chernihiv, (promotion play-offs)
- 4th place – Skala 1911 Stryi, (failed to qualify for the promotion play-offs)

=== Promotion play-offs ===
The relegation–promotion play-off games were scheduled to take place between the 6th (14th) and 7th (15th) placed teams in the Relegation group of the First League with the second and third placed teams of the Second League.

In the Second League play-offs, the two group winners (A and B) squared off for the Second League final, with the winner being granted direct promotion. At the same time, the losing team had qualified for the First League relegation play-off stage with one of the First League teams. Simultaneously, the two group runners-up (the 2nd-placed in each group) face each other to determine the season's third-place team (the third-place final), which would qualify for the First League relegation play-off stage with one of the First League teams as well, while the losing team is eliminated. On 6 May 2025, the PFL held a draw to determine which team would play against another team from another league. The Second League teams played their first games at home.

This was the fourth time Metalurh Zaporizhzhia qualified for the post-season play-offs.

Second League play-offs
Final
B1	Kolos-2 Kovalivka	0	3	3
A1	Probiy Horodenka (p)	1	2	3
Third place
B2	FC Chernihiv	3	1	4
A3	Skala 1911 Stryi	2	0	2

First League relegation play-offs
2L	Kolos-2 Kovalivka	0	0	0
15	Podillya Khmelnytskyi	2	1	3
2L	FC Chernihiv	3	2	5
14	Metalurh Zaporizhzhia	0	0	0

Second League teams	Agg.	First League teams	1st leg	2nd leg
Kolos-2 Kovalivka	0 – 3	Podillya Khmelnytskyi	0–2	0–1
FC Chernihiv	5 – 0	Metalurh Zaporizhzhia	3–0	2–0

=== First Semi-final ===
4 June 2025	Kolos-2 Kovalivka	0–2	Podillya Khmelnytskyi	Bucha, Kyiv Oblast
12:00		Report	Balan 19'; Shkinder 48'	Stadium: Stadium Yuvileinyi; Attendance: 0 Referee: Ihor Stashuk

8 June 2025	Podillya Khmelnytskyi	1–0	Kolos-2 Kovalivka	Khmelnytskyi
12:00	Veremiyenko 58'	Report		Stadium: Podillia; Referee: Andriy Likarenko

Podillya Khmelnytskyi won 3–0 on aggregate.

=== Second Semi-final ===
8 June 2025	FC Chernihiv	3–0	Metalurh Zaporizhzhia	Chernihiv
13:00	Shalfeyev 15'; Bezghubchenko 43'; Romanchenko 81' (p)	Report	Kostyuchenko (yellow card) 78' (yellow-red card) 80'	Stadium: Chernihiv Arena; Attendance: 0 Referee: Maksym Firsov

12 June 2025	Metalurh Zaporizhzhia	0–2	FC Chernihiv	Zaporizhzhia
12:00		Report	Koydan 63'; Shumylo 84'	Stadium: Slavutych Arena; Attendance: 0 Referee: Yevhen Tsybulko

FC Chernihiv won 5–0 on aggregate. Metalurh Zaporizhia avoided relegation after withdrawal of FC Mynai.

== Awards ==
=== Round awards ===
Round	Player			Coach		
Round	Player	Club	Reference	Coach	Club	Reference
Round 1	Vyacheslav Koydan	FC Chernihiv		Bohdan Kostyk	Kulykiv-Bilka	
Round 2	Vladyslav Tyshyninov	FC Trostianets		Mykhailo Basarab	Skala 1911 Stryi	
Round 3	Dmytro Shastal	Polissya-2 Zhytomyr		Volodymyr Kovalyuk	Probiy Horodenka	
Round 4	Ivan Ilchuk	FC Uzhhorod		Volodymyr Kovalyuk (2)	Probiy Horodenka	
Round 5	Vasyl Bilyi	Kulykiv-Bilka		Serhiy Laktionov	Sambir-Nyva-2 Ternopil	
Round 6	Ihor Neledva	Revera 1908 Ivano-Frankivsk		Ivan Fedyk	Rukh-2 Lviv	
Round 7	Edvard Kobak	Lokomotyv Kyiv		Kishan Hautam	Polissya-2 Zhytomyr	
Round 8	Bohdan Orynchak	Probiy Horodenka		Volodymyr Bondarenko	Kolos-2 Kovalivka	
Round 9	Yaroslav Karaman	Polissya-2 Zhytomyr		Vadym Lazorenko	Lokomotyv Kyiv	
Round 10	Yaroslav Bazayev	FC Oleksandriya-2		Ivan Fedyk (2)	Rukh-2 Lviv	
Round 11	Andriy Fesenko	Skala 1911 Stryi		Viktor Bytsiura	FC Oleksandriya-2	
Round 12	Vladyslav Felipovych	Probiy Horodenka		Valeriy Kutsenko	Hirnyk-Sport Horishni Plavni	
winter break
Round 13	Vyacheslav Studenko	Hirnyk-Sport Horishni Plavni		Yuriy Yaroshenko	Nyva Vinnytsia	
Round 14	Vladyslav Semotyuk	Probiy Horodenka		Serhiy Karpenko	Metalist 1925-2 Kharkiv	
Round 15	Dmytro Kovalenko	FC Uzhhorod		Volodymyr Kovalyuk (3)	Probiy Horodenka	
Round 16	Mykhailo Shestakov	SC Vilkhivtsi		Oleksiy Zorin	SC Vilkhivtsi	
Round 17	Danylo Kolesnyk	Kolos-2 Kovalivka		Roman Hnativ	Skala 1911 Stryi	
Round 18	Oleh Vyshnevskyi	FC Uzhhorod		Valeriy Chornyi	FC Chernihiv	

=== Season awards ===
The laureates of the 2024–25 PFL season were:

- Best goalkeeper: (Ukraine) Maksym Tatarenko (Chernihiv)
- Best player: (Ukraine) Bohdan Orynchak (Probiy Horodenka)
- Best goalscorer: (Ukraine) Bohdan Orynchak (Probiy Horodenka)
- Best coach: (Ukraine) Volodymyr Kovalyuk (Probiy Horodenka)

== Number of teams by region ==
Number	Region	Team(s)
4	Lviv Oblast	Kulykiv-Bilka, Sambir-Nyva-2, Rukh-2 and Skala 1911
2	Ivano-Frankivsk Oblast	Probiy and Revera 1908
2	Kyiv Oblast	Chaika and Kolos-2
2	Poltava Oblast	Hirnyk-Sport and Vorskla-2
2	Zakarpattia Oblast	Uzhhorod and Vilkhivtsi
1	Chernihiv Oblast	Chernihiv
1	Kharkiv Oblast	Metalist 1925-2
1	Kirovohrad Oblast	Oleksandriya-2
1	Kyiv	Lokomotyv
1	Odesa Oblast	Real Pharma
1	Sumy Oblast	Trostianets
1	Vinnytsia Oblast	Nyva
1	Zhytomyr Oblast	Polissya-2

== See also ==
- 2024–25 Ukrainian Premier League
- 2024–25 Ukrainian First League
- 2024–25 Ukrainian Football Amateur League
