= 2026–27 Ukrainian First League =

Football competitions

Ukrainian First League
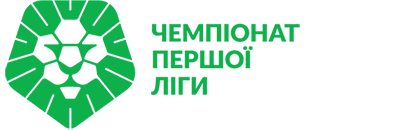
- Season: 2026–27
- Dates: 24 July 2026 – June 2027 (winter break: November 2026 – March 2027)
- Matches: 131
- Goals: 341 (2.6 per match)
- Biggest home win: Kulykiv-Bilka 5–1 Ahrobiznes (30 August 2026); Ahrobiznes 6-0 Probiy (5 September 2026)
- Biggest away win: Polissya-2 2-4 Kulykiv-Bilka (12 October 2026)
- Highest scoring: UCSA 4–4 Oleksandriya (31 July 2026)
- Longest winning run: Viktoriya Sumy (5 matches)
- Longest unbeaten run: Feniks-Mariupol (14 matches)
- Longest winless run: Probiy; Prykarpattya (9 matches)
- Longest losing run: Probiy (6 matches)
- Highest attendance: 1,500; Nyva 0–0 Ahrobiznes (27 September 2026)
- Lowest attendance: 0 (26 matches)
- Total attendance: 36,380
- Average attendance: 302
- All statistics correct as of 22 November 2026.

The 2026–27 Ukrainian First League is the 36th football season of the Ukrainian second-tier competition, PFL Persha Liha (PFL First League or Ukrainian First League), since its establishment. The league competition consisted of 16 teams. The competition is being conducted during the ongoing war with Russia since late February 2022.

It was announced that the new season would start around 25 July 2026 as "base" date, later it was confirmed that some matchweek 1 games take place on 24 and others 26.

== Teams ==
As in the preceding season, this season of the Ukrainian First League consisted of 16 teams.

=== Newcoming teams ===
==== Promoted teams ====
Four teams received direct promotion at the end of the 2025–26 Ukrainian Second League.

- Kulykiv-Bilka – placed 1st in Group A (debut)
- Lokomotyv Kyiv – placed 1st in Group B (debut, previously played in a second tier during the 1940 Soviet Class B)
- Polissya-2 Zhytomyr – placed 2nd in Group A (debut)
- Kolos-2 Kovalivka – placed 2nd in Group B (debut)

==== Relegated teams ====
One team was relegated at the end of the 2025–26 Ukrainian Premier League.

- SC Poltava – 16th placed (returning after a season)
- FC Oleksandriya – 15th placed (returning after 11 seasons)

=== Outgoing teams ===
==== Promoted teams ====
Two teams were promoted to the 2026–27 Ukrainian Premier League.

- Bukovyna Chernivtsi – promoted after four seasons in the second tier.
- Chornomorets Odesa – promoted after a season in the second tier.
- Livyi Bereh Kyiv – promoted after a season in the second tier.

==== Relegated teams ====
Two teams were relegated to the 2026–27 Ukrainian Second League.

- Podillya Khmelnytskyi – relegated after four seasons in the second tier.
- Metalurh Zaporizhia – relegated after four seasons in the second tier.

=== Other administrative issues ===
==== Withdrawn teams ====
- Vorskla Poltava – the club withdrew after one season in the second tier following relegation from the Ukrainian Premier League.

=== Location map ===
The following displays the location of teams.

Home venues of teams in the 2026–27 Ukrainian First League.
Home venues of teams in the 2026–27 Ukrainian First League in Kyiv and Kyiv Oblast

== Stadiums ==
The following stadiums were used as home grounds for the teams in the competition.

Rank	Stadium	Location	Capacity	Club	Notes
1	Vorskla imeni Butovskoho	Poltava	23,842	Poltava	
2	Miskyi imeni Shukhevycha	Ternopil	15,150	Nyva Ternopil	
3	Avanhard	Uzhhorod	10,383	Metalist Kharkiv	used as home ground during the season (Note: Due to the Russian invasion of Ukraine (2022).)
4	Nika Concert and Sports Complex	Oleksandriya	7,000	FC Oleksandriya	
5	Rukh	Ivano-Frankivsk	6,500	Prykarpattia-Blaho	
6	Tsentralnyi Stadion	Zhytomyr	5,928	Polissya-2 Zhytomyr	used as home ground in 1 match
7	Inhulets Arena	Petrove, Kirovohrad Oblast	4,600	Inhulets Petrove	
8	Skif	Lviv	3,742	Feniks-Mariupol	used as home ground during the season
9	Yunist	Volochysk, Khmelnytskyi Oblast	2,700	Ahrobiznes Volochysk	
9	Yunist	Volochysk, Khmelnytskyi Oblast	2,700	Nyva Ternopil	used as home ground in 1 match
10	Probiy Arena	Horodenka, Ivano-Frankivsk Oblast	2,500	Probiy Horodenka	
11	imeni Melnyka	Obukhiv, Kyiv Oblast	2,064	Kolos-2 Kovalivka	
12	imeni Bannikova	Kyiv	1,678	UCSA Tarasivka	
12	imeni Bannikova	Kyiv	1,678	Lokomotyv Kyiv	
13	imeni Kutsa	Trostianets, Sumy Oblast	1,124	Viktoriya Sumy	used as home ground during the season
14	Yuvileinyi	Bucha, Kyiv Oblast	1,028	UCSA Tarasivka	used as home ground during the season
15	Arena Kulykiv	Kulykiv, Lviv Oblast	630	Kulykiv-Bilka	
16	Chernihiv Arena	Chernihiv	500	Chernihiv	
17	Polissya Training Center	Hlybochytsia, Zhytomyr Oblast	266	Polissya-2 Zhytomyr	
17	Polissya Training Center	Hlybochytsia, Zhytomyr Oblast	266	UCSA Tarasivka	used as home ground in 1 match

== Personnel and sponsorship ==
Team	President	Head coach	Captain	Kit manufacturer	Shirt sponsor
Ahrobiznes Volochysk	Oleh Sobutskyi	Oleksandr Chyzhevskyi	Roman Pidkivka	Macron	Агробізнес
Chernihiv	Yuriy Synytsya	Andriy Polyanytsya (caretaker)	Maksym Tatarenko	Adidas	BETON
Feniks-Mariupol	Yuriy Pavlyshyn	Bohdan Blavatskyi	Vladyslav Sydorenko	Puma	GLOBUS
Inhulets Petrove	Oleksandr Povoroznyuk	Valeriy Kutsenko	Stanislav-Nuri Malysh	Joma (Note: Given the fact that the company continues to cooperate with Russian clubs, the logo of Joma on the game uniform is disguised by the logo of another sponsor of the club)	П'ятихатська
Kolos-2 Kovalivka	Andriy Zasukha	Artem Starhorodskyi	Serhiy Shevchuk	Nike	Svitanok
Kulykiv-Bilka	Myron Ostapchak	Serhiy Atlasiuk	Roman Dankovych	Puma	Exim Food
Lokomotyv Kyiv	Oleksandr Yehorov	Serhiy Karpenko	Petro Savchuk	Kelme	Ukrzaliznytsia
Metalist Kharkiv	Yevhen Krasnikov	Andriy Anishchenko	Oleksandr Myzyuk	Joma	—
Nyva Ternopil	Oleksandr Stadnyk	Ivan Fedyk	Maryan Mysyk	Kelme	Fantazia Group
Oleksandriya	Serhiy Kuzmenko	Volodymyr Sharan	Serhiy Buletsa	Kappa	AgroVista
Polissya-2 Zhytomyr	Hennadiy Butkevych	Oleksandr Maksymov	Bohdan Panchyshyn	Nike	BGV Group
SC Poltava	Serhiy Ivashchenko	Ihor Tymchenko	Vladyslav Danylenko	ARTY	КВП, Poltava Brewery, Insortex
Probiy Horodenka	Vitaliy Shevaha	Yuriy Virt	Roman Borysevych	Joma	VD
Prykarpattia-Blaho	Serhiy Ptashnyk	Vasyl Yatsurak	Vasyl Tsyutsyura	Joma	blago
UCSA Tarasivka	Serhiy Lesnyk	Mykola Tsymbal	(Paraguay) Pablo Castro	Kelme	—
Viktoriya Sumy	Serhiy Bondarenko	Volodymyr Romanenko (caretaker)	Dmytro Ulyanov	Puma	—

=== Managerial changes ===
Team	Outgoing head coach	Manner of departure	Date of vacancy	Table	Incoming head coach	Date of appointment
FC Chernihiv	Valeriy Chornyi	Change of role	14 June 2026	Pre-season	Vasyl Baranov	15 June 2026
FC Nyva Ternopil	Yaroslav Matviyiv (caretaker)	End of interim	17 June 2026	Pre-season	Ivan Fedyk	17 June 2026
SC Poltava	Pavlo Matviychenko (interim)	End of interim spell & contract	8 July 2026	Pre-season	Ihor Tymchenko	8 July 2026
Feniks-Mariupol	Maksym Feshchuk	Mutual consent	17 August 2026	12th	Volodymyr Zhuravchak	17 August 2026
Feniks-Mariupol	Volodymyr Zhuravchak	Change of role	18 August 2026	12th	Bohdan Blavatskyi	18 August 2026
FC Chernihiv	Vasyl Baranov	Mutual consent	24 August 2026	10th	Andriy Polyanytsya (caretaker)	24 August 2026
Probiy Horodenka	Volodymyr Kovalyuk	Sacked	6 September 2026	16th	Yuriy Virt	7 September 2026
Inhulets Petrove	Vasyl Kobin	Sacked	7 September 2026	8th	Oleksandr Stakhiv (caretaker)	7 September 2026
Inhulets Petrove	Oleksandr Stakhiv (caretaker)	End of caretaker spell	18 September 2026	6th	Valeriy Kutsenko	18 September 2026
UCSA Tarasivka	(Brazil) Anderson Ribeiro	Resigned	22 September 2026	10th	Mykola Tsymbal	23 September 2026

== League table ==
Pos	Team	Pld	W	D	L	GF	GA	GD	Pts	Promotion, qualification or relegation
1	Feniks-Mariupol	17	9	5	3	25	15	+10	32	Promotion to Ukrainian Premier League
2	Viktoriya Sumy	17	9	5	3	22	13	+9	32	Promotion to Ukrainian Premier League
3	Oleksandriya	17	8	7	2	21	11	+10	31	Qualification to promotion play-offs
4	Ahrobiznes Volochysk	16	9	3	4	26	17	+9	30	Qualification to promotion play-offs
5	Kulykiv-Bilka	16	8	4	4	34	18	+16	28	
6	Poltava	17	8	3	6	27	18	+9	27	
7	Metalist Kharkiv	16	7	3	6	22	18	+4	24	Qualified for the Quarter-finals UC
8	Nyva Ternopil	17	5	8	4	21	16	+5	23	
9	Lokomotyv Kyiv	16	6	5	5	22	21	+1	23	
10	Inhulets Petrove	16	5	4	7	16	22	−6	19	
11	Prykarpattia-Blaho	17	4	6	7	15	21	−6	18	
12	UCSA Tarasivka	17	3	7	7	22	28	−6	16	
13	Kolos-2 Kovalivka	16	4	3	9	14	28	−14	15	Qualification to relegation play-off
14	Polissya-2 Zhytomyr	17	2	7	8	25	34	−9	13	Qualification to relegation play-off
15	Probiy Horodenka	17	2	6	9	16	37	−21	12	Relegation to Ukrainian Second League
16	Chernihiv	13	2	4	7	13	24	−11	10	Relegation to Ukrainian Second League

Updated to match(es) played on 21 November 2026. Source:
Rules for classification: 1) Points; 2) Head-to-head points; 3) Head-to-head goal difference; 4) Head-to-head goals scored; 5) Goal difference in all games; 6) Goals scored in all games (Note: calculation by criteria indicated in rules 2, 3, 4 is conducted with consideration of all teams that have an equal number of tournament points at the moment of calculation and not only among those which after preliminary criteria have appeared more successful).

=== Match results ===
Home \ Away	AHR	CHE	FMA	INH	KK2	KUL	LOK	MET	NVT	OLK	PZ2	POL	PRO	PRY	UCS	VKT
Ahrobiznes		ppd-24/11	2–0		28/11		0–0	1–0		1–0		0–3	6–0	3–0	3–2	
Chernihiv				ppd	ppd	1–1	ppd		1–0		2–2		28/11	TBA		
Feniks-Mariupol	0–0	3–1		4–1	3–1	1–1			0–0		2–1	0–3				0–1
Inhulets	0–1				2–0	1–1		1–0	1–2	28/11	2–1		1–1	2–1		
Kolos-2	1–2 (Note: The round 2 match Kolos-2 v Ahrobiznes that took place on August 8, 2026, was interrupted on two occasions due to an air raid alert in the 1st and 57th minutes of play.)						1–0	0–4		0–2		0–1	4–2	1–0	0–0	1–1
Kulykiv-Bilka	5–1	5–0			5–0			2–1		1–1		2–1	1–2	2–1	2–0	
Lokomotyv		1–1	1–3	2–1		1–0			0–0		3–3	2–1		1–0		0–1
Metalist		2–0	0–2			ppd-04/12	4–2		1–1	0–2	28/11		3–1		3–1	2–2
Nyva	0–0				3–1	3–1				0–0	4–2	0–1		1–2	28/11	
Oleksandriya		1–0	1–1	3–0 (Note: The round 2 match Oleksandriya v Inhulets that took place on August 8, 2026, was postponed due to heavy showers and hail.)			1–3		1–1 (Note: The round 1 match Oleksandriya v Nyva that took place on July 24, 2026, was interrupted on two occasions due to an air raid alert in the 24th and 56th minutes of play.)			1–0	2–0		1–0	1–0
Polissya-2	3–2			2–0	0–3	2–4		0–1		0–0		1–2		1–2	2–2	
Poltava	1–4	3–2	28/11	0–0				3–0	1–1					4–0	0–0	
Probiy		1–1	0–2	2–2			0–2	0–1	2–2		1–1	3–2				0–3
Prykarpattia-Blaho		0–1	1–1		1–1	28/11	2–2	0–0		0–0			3–0		1–0	1–1
UCSA		3–2	1–2	1–2			3–2		1–0	4–4	3–3		1–1			0–0
Viktoriya	2–0	2–1	0–1	1–0	2–0	2–1	28/11		1–3		1–1	2–1				

Updated to match(es) played on 21 November 2026. Source: (in Ukrainian)
Legend: Blue = home team win; Yellow = draw; Red = away team win.

=== Match results by week ===
Team ╲ Round	1	2	3	4	5	6	7	8	9	10	11	12	13	14	15	16	17	18	19	20	21	22	23	24	25	26	27	28	29	30
Ahrobiznes	L	W	W	D	L	W	L	W	D	W	W	W	-	W	L	W	D													
Chernihiv	D	D	D	D	L	W	L	-	L	L	W	L	-	L	-	-	L													
Feniks	L	L	L	W	W	D	W	W	D	D	W	W	W	W	D	W	D													
Inhulets	D	W	L	L	W	D	W	-	W	L	L	L	W	L	D	D	L													
Kolos-2	W	L	L	L	L	W	L	W	W	L	L	D	L	L	-	D	D													
Kulykiv-Bilka	W	D	W	L	W	D	W	L	W	L	W	D	L	W	D	-	W													
Lokomotyv	D	D	L	D	L	L	W	W	W	D	W	D	L	W	L	-	W													
Metalist	L	W	W	L	D	W	L	L	W	D	D	L	L	W	W	-	W													
Nyva	D	D	L	W	D	L	L	W	D	D	W	D	W	D	W	D	L													
Oleksandriya	D	D	W	W	W	D	W	L	D	W	L	D	W	D	W	D	W													
Polissya-2	D	L	L	D	L	D	W	L	L	D	L	D	L	D	L	D	W													
Poltava	W	D	W	D	W	D	L	W	L	W	L	W	W	L	L	L	W													
Probiy	D	L	D	L	L	L	L	L	L	W	W	D	L	D	D	D	L													
Prykarpattia	L	D	L	W	W	D	W	W	L	D	L	L	D	L	D	D	L													
UCSA	D	D	W	D	L	L	W	L	D	L	L	D	W	L	D	D	L													
Viktoriya	W	W	W	W	W	D	L	L	D	W	D	W	D	W	W	L	D													

Updated to match(es) played on 21 November 2026. Source: pfl.ua
W = Win; D = Draw; L = Loss

=== Position by round ===
Number= One and more less matches played per underline. Positions are shown as of the end of the round.

Team ╲ Round	1	2	3	4	5	6	7	8	9	10	11	12	13	14	15	16	17	18	19	20	21	22	23	24	25	26	27	28	29	30
Feniks	15	16	16	12	10	10	9	7	8	7	6	5	3	2	2	1	1													
Viktoriya	3	1	1	1	1	1	1	1	1	1	1	1	1	1	1	2	2													
Oleksandriya	11	9	6	3	3	3	2	3	3	2	4	6	5	5	3	4	3													
Ahrobiznes	16	6	5	5	8	5	7	6	5	5	3	2	4	3	4	3	4													
Kulykiv-Bilka	2	4	3	4	4	4	3	4	2	4	2	3	6	4	5	5	5													
Poltava	1	2	2	2	2	2	4	2	4	3	5	4	2	6	6	6	6													
Metalist	13	5	4	7	6	6	8	9	9	9	9	9	11	9	8	8	7													
Nyva	10	11	12	8	11	13	14	12	13	12	10	10	7	8	7	7	8													
Lokomotyv	9	10	11	13	13	15	15	13	11	10	7	7	8	7	9	9	9													
Inhulets	5	3	8	11	7	8	6	8	6	8	11	11	9	10	10	10	10													
Prykarpattia	14	14	15	9	5	7	5	5	7	6	8	8	10	11	11	11	11													
UCSA	8	8	7	6	9	11	10	10	12	13	13	13	12	12	12	12	12													
Kolos-2	4	7	10	14	14	12	12	11	10	11	12	12	13	13	13	13	13													
Polissya-2	6	13	14	15	16	14	13	15	15	15	16	16	16	16	16	16	14													
Probiy	7	15	13	16	16	16	16	16	16	16	15	15	15	15	14	14	15													
Chernihiv	12	12	9	10	12	9	11	14	14	14	14	14	14	14	15	15	16													

League leaders/Promotion to Ukrainian Premier League
Promotion to Ukrainian Premier League
Qualification to Promotion play-offs
Qualification for the Relegation play-offs
Relegation to Ukrainian Second League

== Statistics ==
=== Goalscorers ===
As of 16 August 2026

Rank	Scorer	Team	Goals (Pen.)
1	Valeriy Sad	Poltava	4 (0)
2	Maksym Boyko	Viktoriya Sumy	3 (0)
2	Vladyslav Semotyuk	Kulykiv-Bilka	3 (0)
2	(Paraguay) Pablo Castro	UCSA Tarasivka	3 (2)
5	12 player(s)		2
17	44 player(s)		1

- Own goal(s):
- (Ukraine national football team) Vasyl Burtnyk (Nyva Ternopil for Oleksandriya) (24 July 2026)
- (Ukraine national football team) Stanislav-Nuri Malysh (Inhulets Petrove for Oleksandriya) (8 August 2026)
- (Armenia national football team) Eduard Halstyan (Chernihiv for Metalist Kharkiv) (26 September 2026)
- (Ukraine national football team) Serhiy Basov (Kolos-2 Kovalvka for Inhulets Petrove) (25 October 2026)
- (Ukraine national football team) Ihor Snurnitsyn (Nyva Ternopil for Kulykiv-Bilka) (25 October 2026)

=== Hat-tricks ===
As of 31 July 2026

Player	For	Against	Result	Date
(Paraguay) Pablo Castro	UCSA Tarasivka	Oleksandriya	4–4 (H)	31 July 2026

=== Clean sheets ===
As of 5 September 2026

Rank	Player	Club	Clean sheets
1	Vladyslav Kucheruk	Viktoriya Sumy	3
1	Mykyta Minchev	Poltava	3
3	Danylo Khmelovskyi	Ahrobiznes Volochysk	2
3	Andriy Klishchuk	Oleksandriya	2
3	Vadym Yushchyshyn	UCSA Tarasivka	2
4	5 player(s)		1

== Awards ==
=== Monthly awards ===
Month	Player of the Month		Awarded by	Ref.
Month	Player	Club	Awarded by	Ref.
August 2026	(Ukraine) Valeriy Sad	SC Poltava	PFL	
September 2026	(Ukraine) Bohdan Mordas	Lokomotyv Kyiv	PFL	
October 2026	(Ukraine) Vitaliy Patulyak	Kulykiv-Bilka	PFL	
November 2026				
April 2027				
May 2027				

=== Round awards ===
Round	Player			Coach		
Round	Player	Club	Reference	Coach	Club	Reference
Round 1	(Ukraine) Dmytro Haladey	Kulykiv-Bilka		(Ukraine) Ihor Tymchenko	SC Poltava	
Round 2	(Paraguay) Pablo Castro	UCSA Tarasivka		(Ukraine) Vasyl Kobin	Inhulets Petrove	
Round 3	(Ukraine) Valeriy Sad	SC Poltava		(Ukraine) Volodymyr Romanenko	Viktoriya Sumy	
Round 4	(Brazil) Jhonatan Da Silva	FC Oleksandriya		(Ukraine) Vasyl Yatsurak	Prykarpattya-Blaho	
Round 5	(Ukraine) Vasyl Tsyutsyura	Prykarpattya-Blaho		(Ukraine) Serhiy Atlasyuk	Kulykiv-Bilka	
Round 6	(Ukraine) Bohdan Kozak	Ahrobiznes Volochysk		(Ukraine) Oleksandr Chyzhevskyi	Ahrobiznes Volochysk	
Round 7	(Ukraine) Ruslan Malskyi	Kulykiv-Bilka		(Ukraine) Serhiy Karpenko	Lokomotyv Kyiv	
Round 8	(Ukraine) Artem Nedolya	Kolos-2 Kovalivka		(Ukraine) Oleksandr Chyzhevskyi (2)	Ahrobiznes Volochysk	
Round 9	(Ukraine) Andriy Bey	Kulykiv-Bilka		(Ukraine) Andriy Anishchenko	Metalist Kharkiv	
Round 10	(Ukraine) Vladyslav Khamelyuk	Viktoriya Sumy		(Ukraine) Yuriy Virt	Probiy Horodenka	
Round 11	(Ukraine) Oleksiy Sakhnenko	Lokomotyv Kyiv		(Ukraine) Serhiy Karpenko (2)	Lokomotyv Kyiv	
Round 12	(Ukraine) Volodymyr Odaryuk	SC Poltava		(Ukraine) Bohdan Blavatskyi	Feniks-Mariupol	
Round 13	(Ukraine) Dmytro Shcherbak	SC Poltava		(Ukraine) Ivan Fedyk	Nyva Ternopil	
Round 14	(Ukraine) Ruslan Dedukh	Viktoriya Sumy		(Ukraine) Andriy Anishchenko (2)	Metalist Kharkiv	
Round 15	(Ukraine) Vitaliy Zhupanskyi	Feniks-Mariupol		(Ukraine) Volodymyr Sharan	FC Oleksandriya	
Round 16	(Ukraine) Andriy Riznyk	Ahrobiznes Volochysk		(Ukraine) Oleksandr Chyzhevskyi (3)	Ahrobiznes Volochysk	
Round 17	(Ukraine) Vitaliy Patulyak	Kulykiv-Bilka		(Ukraine) Oleksandr Maksymov	Polissya-2 Zhytomyr	
Round 18						
winter break
Round 19						
Round 20						
Round 21						
Round 22						
Round 23						
Round 24						
Round 25						
Round 26						
Round 27						
Round 28						
Round 29						
Round 30						

== Post-season play-offs ==
=== Relegation play-offs ===
The relegation–promotion play-off games were expected to be scheduled to take place between the 13th and 14th-placed teams with the third and fourth-placed teams of the Second League.

=== Promotion play-offs ===
Premier League teams	Agg.	First League teams	1st leg	2nd leg
	x–x			
	x–x			

=== First Semi-final ===
v

v

=== Second Semi-final ===
v

v

== Number of teams by region ==
Number	Region	Team(s)
2	Ivano-Frankivsk Oblast	Probiy Horodenka and Prykarpattia Ivano-Frankivsk
2	Kirovohrad Oblast	Inhulets Petrove and Oleksandriya
2	Kyiv Oblast	Kolos-2 Kovalivka and UCSA Tarasivka
2	Lviv Oblast	Feniks-Mariupol Lviv and Kulykiv-Bilka
1	Chernihiv Oblast	Chernihiv
1	Kharkiv Oblast	Metalist Kharkiv
1	Khmelnytskyi Oblast	Ahrobiznes Volochysk
1	Kyiv	Lokomotyv
1	Poltava Oblast	Poltava
1	Sumy Oblast	Viktoriya Sumy
1	Ternopil Oblast	Nyva Ternopil
1	Zhytomyr Oblast	Polissya-2 Zhytomyr

== See also ==
- 2026–27 Ukrainian Cup
- 2026–27 Ukrainian Premier League
- 2026–27 Ukrainian Second League
- 2026–27 Ukrainian Football Amateur League
- 2026–27 Ukrainian Premier League Under-21
- 2026–27 Ukrainian Women's Prime League
- 2026–27 Ukrainian Women's Higher League
- List of Ukrainian football transfers summer 2026
- List of Ukrainian football transfers winter 2026–27
