= 2023–24 Ukrainian Football Amateur League =

Ukrainian Football season

Ukrainian Amateur Football Championship
- Season: 2023–24
- Dates: Group stage: 12 August 2023 – 26 May 2024; Winter break: 20 November 2023 – 15 March 2024; Play-offs: 8 – 28 June 2024
- Teams: 20
- Final stage winner: Ahrotekh Tyshkivka (1st title) Probiy Horodenka (losing finalist)
- Promoted: 4 – Kulykiv-Bilka, Vilkhivtsi, Revera 1908, Probiy

The 2023–24 Ukrainian football championship among amateur teams was the 28th season since it replaced the football championship of physical culture teams. The league competition is organized by the Association of Amateur Football of Ukraine (AAFU).

On 5 September 2022, the AAFU published information about the upcoming season with a tentative composition. Since the Russo-Ukrainian War grew in its intensity in 2022, many clubs were not able to field their teams for the competition.

== Teams ==
Eight (8) teams from last season reapplied for this season.

=== Returning/reformed clubs ===
- Avanhard Lozova – (last played during 1994–95 season)
- Feniks Pidmonastyr – (returning after a season)
- Probiy Horodenka – (last played during 1994–95 season)

=== Debut ===
List of teams that are debuting this season in the league:

- Ahrotekh Tyshkivka
- FAPF Ivano-Frankivsk
- Maramuresh Nyzhnia Apsha
- Penuel Kryvyi Rih
- Podoliany Ternopil
- Sokil Mykhailivka-Rubezhivka
- Tytan Odesa
- Vilkhivtsi
- Vivad Romaniv

=== Withdrawn teams ===
List of clubs that took part in last year competition, but chose not to participate in 2023–24 season:

- Fakel Lypovets
- LSTM 536 Lutsk
- Varatyk Kolomyia

=== Merged/reorganized teams ===
- FC Kulykiv fields as a joined team Kulykiv-Yunist from own club and FC Yunist Nyzhnia Bilka that has competed before (lately in the 2021–22 season).

=== Name change ===
- On 10 November 2023 Feniks officially changed its name to Halychyna-Feniks.
- On 24 January 2024 FA Prykarpattia officially changed its name to Rewera 1908-FAPF.
- On 4 March 2024 FC Kulykiv officially changed its name to FC Kulykiv-Bilka.

=== Location map ===
The following displays the location of teams.

Location of teams in the 2023-24 Ukrainian Amateur League

=== Stadiums ===
Group A

Team	Pop. place	Stadium	Position in 2022–23
Kolos	Polonne	Kolos; Polon	Am1, 1st
Ahron	Velyki Hayi	(Village Stadium)	Am1, 2nd
Kulykiv	Kulykiv	Arena Kulykiv	Am1, 5th
Vilkhivtsi	Vilkhivtsi	Vikhivtsi Arena-Park	Reg
Maramuresh	Nyzhnia Apsha	Viktoriya	Reg
Probiy	Horodenka	Kolos	Reg
FAPF	Ivano-Frankivsk	Akademii NFC Urahan	Reg
Vivad	Romaniv	Tsentralnyi	Reg
Sokil	Mykhailivka-Rubezhivka	Shkilnyi	Reg
Feniks	Pidmonastyr	Arena Feniks	Reg
Podoliany	Ternopil	Futbolne pole No.1 imeni Shukhevycha	Reg

Group B

Team	Pop. place	Stadium	Position in 2022–23
Naftovyk	Okhtyrka	Naftovyk	Am2, 2nd
Shturm	Ivankiv	Metalurh, Kalynivka; Dynamo Training Center, Koncha-Zaspa	Am2, 3rd
Olimpiya	Savyntsi	Start, Myrhorod	Am2, 4th
Atlet	Kyiv	Atlet	Am2, 6th
Zirka	Kropyvnytskyi	Zirka imeni Berezkina	Am3, 8th
Tytan	Odesa	Ivan	Reg
Ahrotekh	Tyshkivka	Lyceum Stadium	Reg
Avanhard	Lozova	DYuSSh Stadium, Yuryivka, Dnipropetrovsk Oblast	Reg
Penuel	Kryvyi Rih	Svitlo	Reg

Notes:

- Reg — regional championship (Regions of Ukraine)
- Am[#] — AAFU championship where sign (#) indicates Group number

== Group stage ==
=== Group 1 ===
Pos	Team	Pld	W	D	L	GF	GA	GD	Pts	Promotion, qualification or relegation
1	Kulykiv-Bilka (C)	20	19	1	0	55	12	+43	58	Qualification to play-offs Admission to Ukrainian Second League
2	Podoliany Ternopil	20	12	3	5	47	23	+24	39	Qualification to final stage Withdrawn after season
3	Ahron Velyki Hayi	20	9	5	6	29	21	+8	32	Qualification to play-offs
4	Kolos Polonne	20	9	3	8	28	29	−1	30	Qualification to play-offs
5	Probiy Horodenka	20	7	8	5	27	21	+6	29	Qualification to play-offs Admission to Ukrainian Second League
6	Vivad Romaniv	20	7	7	6	25	21	+4	28	
7	Maramuresh Nyzhnia Apsha	20	6	6	8	20	27	−7	24 (Note: Head-to-head results: Maramuresh – Vilkhivtsi 1:1, Vilkhivtsi – Maramuresh 0:1)	Withdrawn
8	Vilkhivtsi	20	7	3	10	30	31	−1	24	Admission to Ukrainian Second League
9	Feniks Pidmonastyr	20	5	1	14	23	46	−23	16 (Note: Head-to-head results: Feniks – Sokil 4:0, Sokil – Halychyna-Feniks 1:0)	
10	Sokil Mykhailivka-Rubezhivka	20	4	4	12	18	44	−26	16	
11	FAPF Ivano-Frankivsk	20	3	3	14	26	53	−27	12	Admission to Ukrainian Second League

Source: http://www.aafu.org.ua/
Rules for classification: 1) Points; 2) Head-to-head points; 3) Head-to-head wins; 4) Head-to-head goal difference; 5) Head-to-head goals scored; 6) Wins; 7) Goal difference; 8) Goals scored; 9) Draw of lots.
(C) Champions
Notes:

=== Group 2 ===
Pos	Team	Pld	W	D	L	GF	GA	GD	Pts	Promotion, qualification or relegation
1	Olimpiya Savyntsi (C)	16	11	2	3	33	13	+20	35	Qualification to final stage
2	Ahrotekh Tyshkivka	16	9	3	4	40	16	+24	30	Qualification to final stage
3	Tytan Odesa (Note: On April 3, 2024, Tytan Odesa was fined 5,000 hryvnia for failing to appear for the match against Naftovyk Okhtyrka on March 30, which has been postponed on their request earlier and originally scheduled to take place on October 22, 2023.)	16	10	0	6	30	24	+6	30	Qualification to final stage
4	Naftovyk Okhtyrka	16	8	4	4	19	14	+5	28	
5	Atlet Kyiv	16	6	4	6	26	23	+3	22 (Note: Head-to-head results: Zirka – Atlet 2:5, Atlet – Zirka 3:1)	
6	Zirka Kropyvnytskyi	16	7	1	8	25	34	−9	22	
7	Shturm Ivankiv	16	6	3	7	26	22	+4	21	Withdrawn
8	Avanhard Lozova	16	3	3	10	20	35	−15	12	
9	Penuel Kryvyi Rih	16	2	0	14	7	45	−38	6	

Source: http://www.aafu.org.ua/
Rules for classification: 1) Points; 2) Head-to-head points; 3) Head-to-head wins; 4) Head-to-head goal difference; 5) Head-to-head goals scored; 6) Wins; 7) Goal difference; 8) Goals scored; 9) Draw of lots.
(C) Champions
Notes:

== Final stage ==
To the stage qualify eight teams, selection of which is determined exclusively by the AAFU Commission in conducting competitions.

=== Teams qualified ===
In parentheses are indicated number of times the club qualified for this phase.

- Group 1: Kulykiv-Bilka (2), Podoliany Ternopil, Ahron Velyki Hayi (2), Kolos Polonne (2), Probiy Horodenka
- Group 2: Olimpiya Savyntsi (3), Ahrotekh Tyshkivka, Tytan Odesa

=== Quarterfinals ===
Games are scheduled for 1 and 8 June 2024.

Team 1	Agg.	Team 2	1st leg	2nd leg
First leg – June 1, Second leg – June 8
Ahron Velyki Hayi	4 – 5	Ahrotekh Tyshkivka	2–1	2–4
Kolos Polonne	0 – 5	Olimpiya Savyntsi	0–2	(0–3)
First leg – June 1, Second leg – June 9
Tytan Odesa	1 – 6	Podoliany Ternopil	1–3	(0–3)
First leg – June 2, Second leg – June 9
Probiy Horodenka	1 – 1 (a)	FC Kulykiv-Bilka	0–0	1–1

1 June 2024	Ahron Velyki Hayi	2–1	Ahrotekh Tyshkivka	Velyki Hayi, Ternopil Oblast
13:00	Lutsyk 6'; Hromyak 90+1'	Report	Chychykov 37'	Stadium: sela Velyki Hayi; Referee: Taras Kozak (Lviv Oblast)

1 June 2024	Kolos Polonne	0–2	Olimpiya Savyntsi	Polonne, Khmelnytskyi
13:00		Report	Rudenko 75', 83'	Stadium: Polon; Referee: Ihor Sadkovskyi (Ternopil Oblast)

1 June 2024	Tytan Odesa	1–3	Podoliany Ternopil	Chornomorsk, Odesa Oblast
13:00	Spivachenko 49'	Report	Malskyi 43'; Protsiv 63'; Zhumiha 90+2'	Stadium: Shkilnyi; Referee: Artem Hordynskyi (Vinnytsia)

2 June 2024	Probiy Horodenka	0–0	FC Kulykiv-Bilka	Horodenka, Ivano-Frankivsk Oblast
15:00		Report	Bilyi (penalty missed) 49'	Stadium: Probiy Arena; Referee: Mykola Baidyuk (Chernivtsi)

8 June 2023	Ahrotekh Tyshkivka	4–2	Ahron Velyki Hayi	Tyshkivka, Kirovohrad Oblast
	Sokolan 48', 80'; Pastukhov 65', 90+11'	Report	Hromyak 7'; Voytseshchuk 70'; Skakun (yellow card) 47' (yellow-red card) 90+7'	Stadium: Litseyu; Referee: Andriy Voyevoda (Dnipro)

8 June 2023	Olimpiya Savyntsi	DNP	Kolos Polonne	Myrhorod, Poltava Oblast
		Report		Stadium: Start

9 June 2023	Podoliany Ternopil	DNP	Tytan Odesa	Ternopil
		Report		Stadium: imeni Shukhevycha

9 June 2023	FC Kulykiv-Bilka	1–1	Probiy Horodenka	Kulykiv, Lviv Oblast
	Hladkyi 74'	Report	Voloshynovych 55'	Stadium: Kulykiv Arena; Attendance: 250; Referee: Andriy Shevchuk (Volyn Oblast)

=== Semifinals ===
Games are scheduled for 15 and 22 June 2024.

Team 1	Agg.	Team 2	1st leg	2nd leg
First leg – June 15, Second leg – June 22
Ahrotekh Tyshkivka	6 – 1	Olimpiya Savyntsi	3–1	3–0
First leg – June 16, Second leg – June 22
Probiy Horodenka	3 – 1	Podoliany Ternopil	0–0	3–1

15 June 2024	Ahrotekh Tyshkivka	3–1	Olimpiya Savyntsi	Tyshkivka, Kirovohrad Oblast
13:00	Skorov 42'; Sokolan 61'; Kulibaba 89'	Report	Karetnyk 90+2'; Kovtun (red card) 90+4'	Stadium: litseyu Attendance: 200; Referee: Vladyslav Hrytsai (Kyiv Oblast)

16 June 2024	Probiy Horodenka	0–0	Podoliany Ternopil	Horodenka, Ivano-Frankivsk Oblast
15:00		[ Report]		Stadium: Probiy Arena

22 June 2024	Olimpiya Savyntsi	0–3	Ahrotekh Tyshkivka	Myrhorod, Poltava Oblast
13:00		Report	Sokolan 38'; Radchenko 62'; Zahalskyi 85'	Stadium: Start; Referee: Veronika Vasylchenko (Slovyansk)

22 June 2024	Podoliany Ternopil	1–3	Probiy Horodenka	Ternopil
13:00	Malskyi 79' (pen.); Zhumiha (red card) 71'	Report	Sondey 36' (pen.), 53'; Sikach 64'; Voloshynovych (yellow card) 70' (red card) 71'	Stadium: Miskyi imeni Shukhevycha; Attendance: 270; Referee: Mykola Baidyuk (Chernivtsi)

=== Final ===
28 June 2024	Probiy Horodenka	0–2	Ahrotekh Tyshkivka	Kyiv
13:00		Report	Surzhenko 45+2'; Ponomarenko 82'	Stadium: imeni Bannikova; Referee: Maksym Skrypnyk (Kyiv Oblast)

== Promotions to the Second League ==
The amateur teams are allowed to participate in the Ukrainian championship among teams of the 2024–25 Ukrainian Second League (Professional Football League of Ukraine) under such conditions:

- Team participated in the Ukrainian championship among amateur teams throughout the 2023–24 season and was a participant of the championship play-off stage.
- The club received a license in accordance to the Regulation on licensing of football clubs of the Ukrainian Second League.
- The club and its results of participation in the AAFU competitions meet the requirements that are defined in regulations of the All-Ukrainian competitions in football among clubs' teams of the 2023–24 Professional Football League of Ukraine.

According to the PFL information partner "Sport Arena", on 9 November 2023 at least seven clubs were interested to join professional competitions next season: Kulykiv-Yunist (Nyzhnia Bilka), Feniks (Pidmonastyr), Penuel (Kryvyi Rih), Probiy (Horodenka), Podoliany (Ternopil), Tytan (Odesa), FAPF (Ivano-Frankivsk). Later in spring of next year there were interested the following clubs: Kulykiv-Yunist (Nyzhnia Bilka), Feniks (Pidmonastyr), Probiy (Horodenka), Podoliany (Ternopil), Maramuresh (Nyzhnia Apsha), FAPF (Ivano-Frankivsk), Vilkhivtsi.

=== AAFU clubs admitted to the PFL ===
- FC Kulykiv-Bilka
- FC Probiy Horodenka
- SC Vilkhivtsi
- FAPF Ivano-Frankivsk as FC Revera 1908 Ivano-Frankivsk

== Number of teams by region ==
Number	Region	Team(s)
2	Ivano-Frankivsk Oblast	Rewera 1908-FAPF, Probiy Horodenka
2	Kirovohrad Oblast	Ahrotekh Tyshkivka, Zirka Kropyvnytskyi
2	Kyiv Oblast	Shturm Ivankiv, Sokil Mykhailivka-Rubezhivka
2	Lviv Oblast	Kulykiv-Bilka, Halychyna-Feniks Pidmonastyr
2	Ternopil Oblast	Ahron Velyki Hayi, Podoliany Ternopil
2	Zakarpattia Oblast	Maramuresh Nyzhnia Apsha, SC Vilkhivtsi
1	Dnipropetrovsk Oblast	Penuel Kryvyi Rih
1	Kharkiv Oblast	Avanhard Lozova
1	Khmelnytskyi Oblast	Kolos Polonne
1	Kyiv	Atlet
1	Odesa Oblast	Tytan Odesa
1	Poltava Oblast	Olimpiya Savyntsi
1	Sumy Oblast	Naftovyk Okhtyrka
1	Zhytomyr Oblast	Vivad Romaniv

== See also ==
- 2023–24 Ukrainian Second League
- 2023–24 Ukrainian First League
- 2023–24 Ukrainian Premier League
- 2023–24 Ukrainian Amateur Cup
