= Volodymyr Borysevych =

Ukrainian association football player

Personal information
- Date of birth: 3 November 1969 (age 56)
- Height: 1.87 m (6 ft 2 in)
- Position: Forward

Senior career*
Years	Team	Apps	(Gls)
1992	Dnister Zalishchyky	13	(2)
1993	Volyn Lutsk	1	(0)
1993	Dnister Zalishchyky	21	(4)
1993	Pokuttia Kolomyia	12	(7)
1994–1995	FC Probiy Horodenka	20	(0)
1996	FC Agro Chișinău	1	(0)
1996–1997	FC Probiy Horodenka		
1998	Bukovyna Chernivtsi	15	(0)
2000	Dynamo-Orbita Kamianets-Podilskyi		
2000–2002	Luzhany		
2002	Delta Hvizdets		
2003	Luzhany		
2004	Karpaty Yaremche		
2005	Luzhany		
2011	FC Probiy Horodenka		
2013–2014	Kameniar Serafymtsi		
- * Club domestic league appearances and goals

Volodymyr Mykolayovych Borysevych (Ukrainian: Володимир Миколайович Борисевич; born 3 November 1969) is a Ukrainian former football player who played as the attacker.

== Biography ==
Borysevych played for FC Volyn Lutsk, and for the Ukrainian first league Bukovina and the club Dniester, also played a short time in the Higher Moldovan division for the Agro Club. Borysevych Volodymyr for a long time played in the amateur teams of the Ivano-Frankivsk region and is a record holder from the goals of the Championship of the Ivano-Frankivsk region in football.

Volodymyr Borysevych began his football career after serving in the army in the team of the Amateur Team Kolomyia "Pokuta" in 1991. In March 1993, Borysevych received an invitation to the team of the Higher League "Volyn".
