= Ivan Bilyi =

Ukrainian footballer (born 1988)

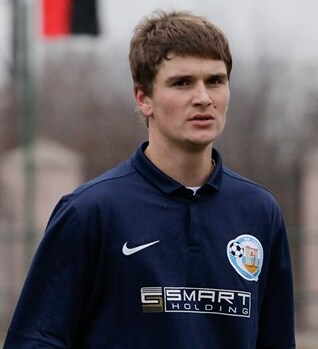

Personal information
- Full name: Ivan Ivanovych Bilyi
- Date of birth: 27 January 1988 (age 38)
- Place of birth: Truskavets, Soviet Union (now Ukraine)
- Height: 1.82 m (6 ft 0 in)
- Position: Centre-back

Youth career
- 2005: UFK Lviv
- 2005–2007: Karpaty Lviv

Senior career*
Years	Team	Apps	(Gls)
2007–2008	Arsenal Bila Tserkva	21	(1)
2008–2011	Lviv	17	(1)
2009–2010	→ Lviv-2	13	(1)
2010	→ Mykolaiv (loan)	10	(0)
2011	Lviv	12	(1)
2011–2013	Sevastopol	5	(0)
2011–2012	→ Sevastopol-2	9	(2)
2013	Desna Chernihiv	19	(1)
2014	Karyer Staryi Sambir (amateurs)	8	(4)
2014	Stal Dniprodzerzhynsk	3	(1)
2014–2015	Mykolaiv	19	(0)
2015	Poltava	7	(1)
2016	Arsenal Kyiv	26	(0)
2016–2018	Rukh Vynnyky	38	(4)
2019	Lokomotiv Yerevan	7	(0)
2019–2020	Hirnyk-Sport Horishni Plavni	18	(4)
2020–2021	VPK-Ahro Shevchenkivka	13	(1)
2021–2022	Olimpik Donetsk	12	(3)
2022–2023	Yunist Velyka Bilka		
2023–2024	FC Kulykiv-Bilka	7	(3)
2024–2025	Probiy Horodenka	28	(4)
- * Club domestic league appearances and goals

Ivan Ivanovych Bilyi (Ukrainian: Іван Іванович Білий; born 27 January 1988) is a retired Ukrainian professional footballer who played as a centre-back.

== Career ==
Bilyi is the product of the Sportive Schools in Lviv: UFK and Karpaty. His coach was Oleh Naduda.

He signed a contract with FC Lviv in 2008, but made his debut for the first team only in a match against FC Arsenal Bila Tserkva on 3 April 2010.

In 2019, Bilyi joined Armenian club Lokomotiv Yerevan.

== Personal life ==
His younger brother Vasyl Bilyi is also a professional football player.

== Honours ==
Probiy Horodenka

- Ukrainian Second League: 2024–25
