= Mykola Sikach =

Ukrainian footballer

Personal information
- Full name: Mykola Romanovych Sikach
- Date of birth: 21 September 1991 (age 35)
- Place of birth: Tysmenychany, Ivano-Frankivsk Oblast, Ukraine
- Position: Left-back

Team information
- Current team: Probiy Horodenka
- Number: 7

Senior career*
Years	Team	Apps	(Gls)
2010	Nika-Dynamo Ivano-Frankivsk	0	(0)
2011	Teplovyk Ivano-Frankivsk	27	(3)
2012–2015	Prydnistrovya Tlumach	72	(13)
2016–2020	Pokuttia Kolomyia	90	(8)
2020–2022	Prykarpattia Ivano-Frankivsk	39	(1)
2022–2023	Vilkhivtsi		
2023	Probiy Horodenka	20	(1)
2023–	Probiy Horodenka	39	(6)
- * Club domestic league appearances and goals as of 4 June 2026

Mykola Romanovych Sikach (Ukrainian: Микола Романович Сікач; born 21 September 1991) is a Ukrainian professional footballer who plays as a left-back for Probiy Horodenka.
