= Maksym Tsvirenko =

Ukrainian footballer

Personal information
- Full name: Maksym Ihorovych Tsvirenko
- Date of birth: 6 December 1998 (age 27)
- Place of birth: Kharkiv, Ukraine
- Height: 1.86 m (6 ft 1 in)
- Position: Centre-back

Team information
- Current team: Metalist 1925 Kharkiv

Youth career
- 2011–2015: Metalist Kharkiv

Senior career*
Years	Team	Apps	(Gls)
2015–2016	Status Kehychivka	0	(0)
2016–2017	Metalist 1925 Kharkiv	8	(0)
2017	Zmiiv	0	(0)
2017–2018	Trostianets	0	(0)
2018–2021	Metalist 1925 Kharkiv	43	(3)
2021–2022	Hirnyk-Sport Horishni Plavni	26	(0)
Total		77	(3)
- * Club domestic league appearances and goals

Maksym Ihorovych Tsvirenko (Ukrainian: Максим Ігорович Цвіренко; born 6 December 1998) is a Ukrainian association football coach and former player who played as a centre-back.
