= FC Kulykiv-Bilka =

Kulykiv-Bilka
- Full name: Football Club Kulykiv-Bilka
- Founded: 2008; 18 years ago
- Ground: Arena Kulykiv, Kulykiv
- Capacity: 630
- Chairman: Myron Ostapchak
- Manager: Serhii Atlasiuk
- League: Ukrainian First League
- 2025–26: Second League Group A, 1st of 11 (promoted)
- Website: https://fckulykiv-bilka.com.ua/
Home colours

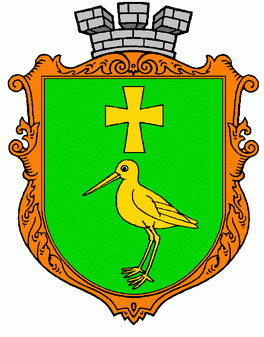
Coat of arms of Kulykiv

Football Club Kulykiv-Bilka (Ukrainian: Футбольний Клуб «Куликів-Білка») or FC Kulykiv-Bilka is a Ukrainian professional football club based in Kulykiv, Lviv Raion. They currently play in the Ukrainian First League from 2026–27, the second tier of Ukrainian football after promotion from the Second League in 2025–26.

== History ==
The club was founded as FC Kulykiv in June 2008. In 2011, FC Kulykiv saw its first major success in amateur football, winning the Lviv Oblast Championship and the Lviv Oblast Super Cup and reaching the final of the Lviv Oblast Cup. In 2019, the club came under the ownership of Myron Ostapchuk, who became the club president and restarted the club's participation in the Lviv Oblast Premier League.

In 2023, a nearby amateur football club FC Yunist Verkhnia Bilka (founded in 1970), winner of Lviv Oblast Championship in 2018, 2019, 2020, 2021, and 2022, as well as the Lviv Oblast Cup in 2017 and 2022, decided to merge together with FC Kulykiv. The president of FC Kulykiv, Myron Ostapchak, became the president of the newly merged FC Kulykiv-Bilka, and the president of FC Yunist, Oleksandr Rolko, became the Vice-President. In 2023, the club won the Lviv Oblast Championship. In the 2023-24 season, the club achieved first place in Group 1 of the Ukrainian Amateur Football Championship with 19 wins and one draw, but lost on away goals in the quarter-finals of the league playoffs to Probiy. Nevertheless, the club still decided to become professional and successfully applied to participate in 2024–25 Ukrainian Second League. In their first professional season, the team achieved a very respectable result, finishing 4th in Group A, only two points behind 3rd place and narrowly missing the playoffs for promotion.

In the 2025–26 season, Kulykiv-Bilka secured promotion to the Ukrainian First League for the first time in their history, after finishing in first place in Group A of the Ukrainian Second League. They also won the 2025–26 Ukrainian Second League after beating the Group B winners FC Lokomotyv Kyiv 2-1 in the league final on May 31, 2026.

== League history ==
=== Ukraine ===
| Season | Div. | Pos. | Pl. | W | D | L | GS | GA | P | Domestic Cup | Europe | | Notes |
|---|---|---|---|---|---|---|---|---|---|---|---|---|---|
| 2024–25 | 3rd Group A (Second League) | 4_{/10} | 18 | 9 | 4 | 5 | 27 | 17 | 31 | - | - | - | - |
| 2025–26 | 3rd Group A (Second League) | 1_{/11} | 30 | 21 | 5 | 4 | 58 | 18 | 68 | Round of 64 (1/32) | - | - | Promoted to Ukrainian First League Title play-off: FC Lokomotyv Kyiv 2:1 |
| 2026–27 | 2nd (First League) | 4_{/16} | 10 | 5 | 2 | 3 | 20 | 11 | 17 | Round of 32 (1/16) | - | - | TBD |

== Players ==
=== Current squad ===
As of 7 September 2026

Note: Flags indicate national team as defined under FIFA eligibility rules; some limited exceptions apply. Players may hold more than one non-FIFA nationality.

| No. | Pos. | Nation | Player |
|---|---|---|---|
| 1 | GK | UKR | Roman Dankovych |
| 2 | DF | UKR | Ivan Havrushko |
| 4 | DF | UKR | Tymofii Kalynchuk |
| 5 | DF | UKR | Nazarii Turko |
| 6 | MF | UKR | Andrii Lebedenko |
| 7 | MF | UKR | Vitalii Patulyak |
| 8 | MF | UKR | Ruslan Malskyi |
| 9 | MF | UKR | Roman Lisovyk |
| 10 | MF | UKR | Oleh Panasyuk (captain) |
| 11 | MF | UKR | Andrii Bei |
| 13 | FW | UKR | Mykyta Sharabura |
| 17 | MF | UKR | Vladyslav Semotyuk |

| No. | Pos. | Nation | Player |
|---|---|---|---|
| 18 | DF | UKR | Mykhailo Kashuba |
| 21 | DF | UKR | Oleksandr Savoshko |
| 22 | MF | UKR | Serhii Kopyl |
| 23 | MF | UKR | Danyil Volkov |
| 26 | FW | UKR | Dmytro Haladey |
| 32 | GK | UKR | Heorhiy Klimov |
| 33 | MF | UKR | Oleh Nychyporenko |
| 45 | DF | UKR | Maksym Sasovskyi |
| 77 | DF | UKR | Maksym Mudryi |
| 86 | DF | UKR | Illia Popovskyi |
| 97 | GK | UKR | Oleksandr Kiktenko |

== Staff and management ==
| Administration | Coaching |
|---|---|
| President – Myron Ostapchak; Vice-President - Oleksandr Rolko; Director - Volodymyr Dutkevych; Sporting Director – Vasyl Kardash; Executive Director – Mykhailo Savka; Head of Football Development - Anthony Balseca | Head Coach – Serhii Atlasiuk; Coach – Oleksii Zorin; Goalkeeping Coach – Andrii Zhezlo; Fitness Coach - Vasyl Bilyi |

== Administration history ==
=== President ===
- 2008–2019: Yurii Potareiko
- 2019–Present: Myron Ostapchak

== Honours ==
- Ukrainian Second League
  - Winner(s) (1): 2025–26
- Lviv Oblast Championship
  - Winner(s) (2): 2011, 2023
- Lviv Oblast Cup
  - Runner(s)-up (1): 2011
- Lviv Oblast Super Cup
  - Winner(s) (1): 2011
