= Ivan Holovkin =

Ukrainian footballer

Personal information
- Full name: Ivan Mykolayovych Holovkin
- Date of birth: 24 May 2000 (age 26)
- Place of birth: Donetsk, Ukraine
- Height: 1.80 m (5 ft 11 in)
- Position: Midfielder

Team information
- Current team: Zorya Luhansk
- Number: 24

Youth career
- 2013–2017: Shakhtar Donetsk

Senior career*
Years	Team	Apps	(Gls)
2017–2018	Krystal Kherson	17	(2)
2018–2019	Mariupol	0	(0)
2019	Volyn Lutsk	0	(0)
2020–2021	Krystal Kherson	26	(1)
2021–2023	Inhulets Petrove	20	(1)
2023–	Zorya Luhansk	3	(0)
2024	→ Mynai (loan)	5	(1)
2025	→ Kolos Kovalivka (loan)	0	(0)
2025	→ Kolos Kovalivka II (loan)	5	(3)
- * Club domestic league appearances and goals as of 20 December 2025

Ivan Mykolayovych Holovkin (Ukrainian: Іван Миколайович Головкін; born 24 May 2000) is a Ukrainian professional footballer who plays as a midfielder for Ukrainian Premier League club Zorya Luhansk.

== Career ==
Holovkin is a product of the Shakhtar Donetsk youth sportive school in his native city and from August 2017 he spent his early career in the Ukrainian amateur levels, in the Ukrainian Premier League Reserves and Under 19 Championship and in the Ukrainian Second League.

In June 2021 he signed a contract with the Ukrainian Premier League team Inhulets Petrove.
