= Ivan Fedyk =

Ukrainian football manager

Personal information
- Full name: Ivan Zinonovych Fedyk
- Date of birth: 9 July 1987 (age 39)
- Place of birth: Drohobych, Soviet Union (now Ukraine)

Team information
- Current team: Nyva Ternopil (manager)

Managerial career
- Years: Team
- 2010–2012: Karpaty Lviv (academy)
- 2012–2013: Sevastopol (assistant)
- 2013–2014: Krasnodar (assistant)
- 2016–2017: Stal Kamianske (assistant)
- 2017–2018: Rostov (assistant)
- 2019–2020: Rukh Lviv (assistant)
- 2020–2021: Rukh Lviv
- 2023–2025: Rukh Lviv (sporting director)
- 2024–2025: Rukh-2 Lviv
- 2025–2026: Rukh Lviv
- 2026–: Nyva Ternopil

Ivan Zinonovych Fedyk (Ukrainian: Іван Зінонович Федик; born 9 July 1987) is a Ukrainian football manager who currently manages Nyva Ternopil.

== Career ==
Fedyk was born in Drohobych, in the Ukrainian SSR of the Soviet Union - in present-day Ukraine. Before starting his coaching career Fedyk studied at the Lviv State University of Physical Culture and was a sports journalist of newspaper "Sportyvka".

On 15 June 2020, Fedyk made his debut as a manager (head coach) after being appointed to the position of the Ukrainian First League (second tier) FC Rukh Lviv. The more experienced coach Myron Markevych joint him as a consultant.

== Honours ==
Individual

- Ukrainian Premier League Coach of the Month: 2020-21(December),
