= Serhiy Karpenko =

Ukrainian footballer

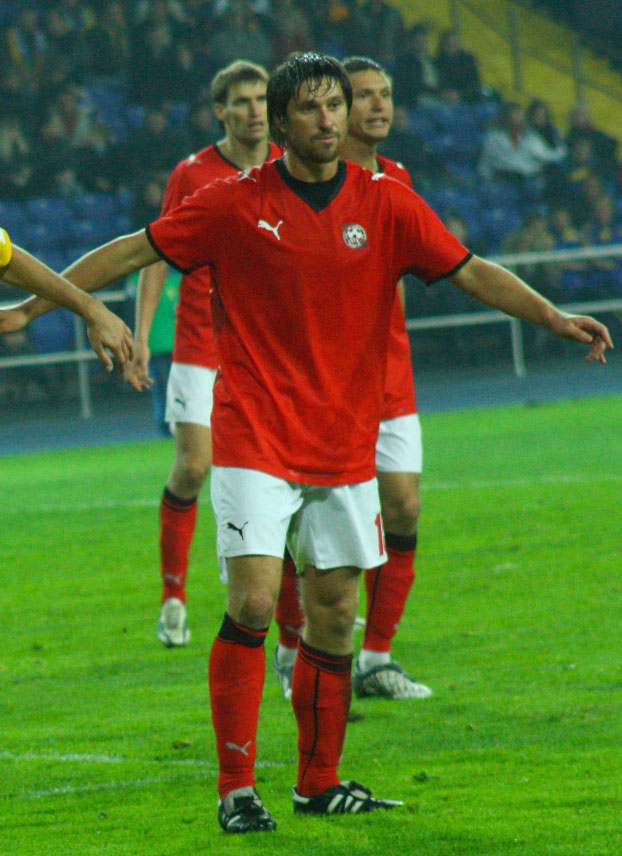

Personal information
- Full name: Serhiy Vasylyovych Karpenko
- Date of birth: 19 May 1981 (age 45)
- Place of birth: Boryspil, Ukrainian SSR
- Height: 1.82 m (5 ft 11 1/2 in)
- Position: Defender

Senior career*
Years	Team	Apps	(Gls)
1998	Borysfen Boryspil	1	(0)
2001–2004	Arsenal Kharkiv	89	(3)
2004	Nyva Vinnytsia	3	(0)
2005–2006	Helios Kharkiv	26	(1)
2006–2008	Naftovyk-Ukrnafta Okhtyrka	67	(3)
2009–2011	FC Kryvbas Kryvyi Rih	20	(1)
2010–2011	→ Naftovyk-Ukrnafta Okhtyrka (loan)	34	(3)
2012	Lviv	9	(0)
2012–2013	Tytan Armyansk	43	(0)
2014	Chaika Petropavlivska Borshchahivka	14	(1)
2014–2016	Arsenal Kyiv	25	(0)
2016	Patriot Baryshivka	12	(0)
2017–2018	Avanhard Bziv		

Managerial career
- 2017–2019: Avanhard Bziv
- 2020–2021: Polissya Stavky
- 2021–2023: Nyva Buzova
- 2023–2024: Metalist 1925 Kharkiv (U19)
- 2024: Metalist 1925 Kharkiv (caretaker)
- * Club domestic league appearances and goals

Serhiy Vasylyovych Karpenko (Ukrainian: Сергій Васильович Карпенко; born 19 May 1981) is a Ukrainian former football defender and Ukrainian coach.

== Honours ==
=== As player ===
- Naftovyk Okhtyrka:

Winner of the Persha Liha: 2006–07

- Arsenal Kharkiv:

Runner-up of the Druha Liha: 2001–02, Group B

=== As coach ===
- Avanhard Bziv:

Winner of the Ukrainian Amateur Cup: 2018–19

- Nyva Buzova:

Winner of the Druha Liha: 2022–23
