= Roman Pomazan =

Ukrainian footballer (born 1994)

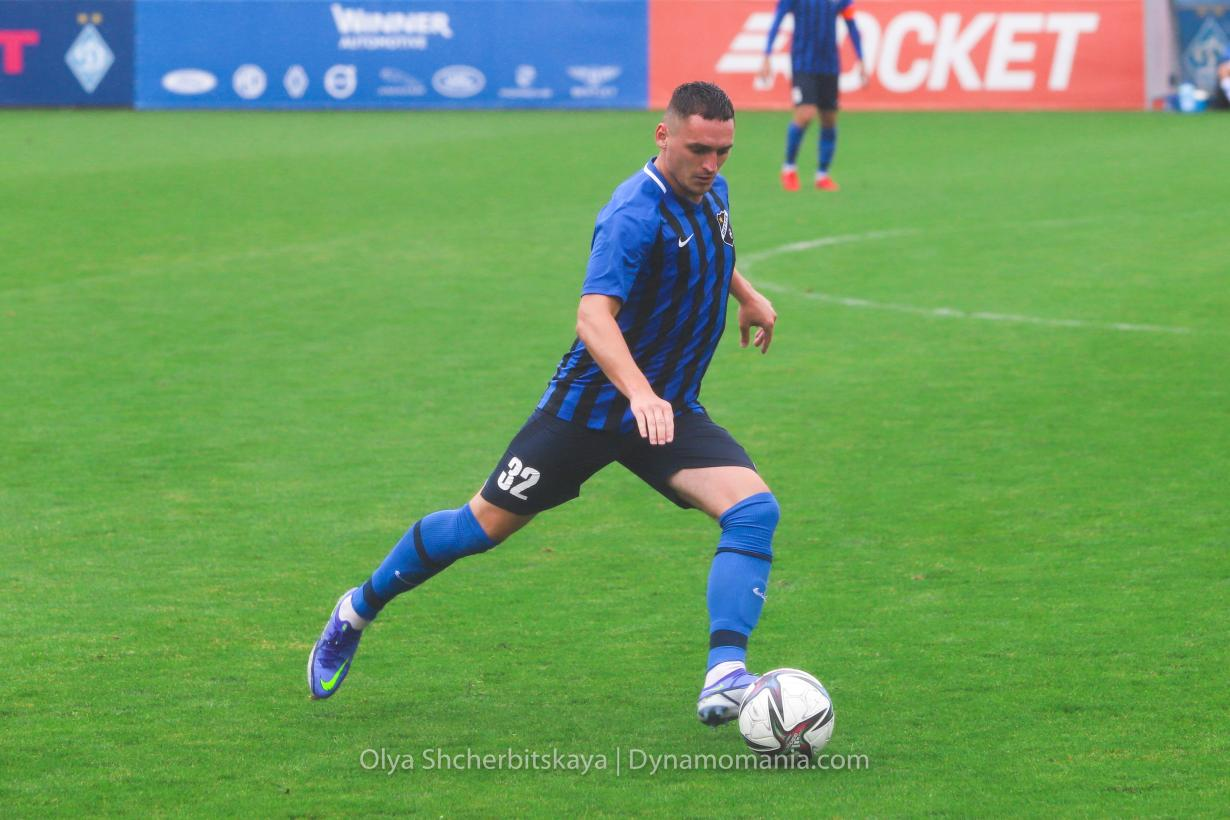

Personal information
- Full name: Roman Maksymovych Pomazan
- Date of birth: 5 September 1994 (age 32)
- Place of birth: Berdiansk, Ukraine
- Height: 1.79 m (5 ft 10 in)
- Position: Defender

Team information
- Current team: Dinaz Vyshhorod
- Number: 23

Youth career
- 2008–2010: FC Azovstal Mariupol
- 2010–2011: Olimpik Donetsk

Senior career*
Years	Team	Apps	(Gls)
2013–2015	Metalurh Zaporizhya	13	(0)
2016	Helios Kharkiv	7	(0)
2016–2017	Inhulets-2 Petrove	7	(0)
2017	Shukura Kobuleti	15	(0)
2018	Chaika	16	(0)
2019	Yerevan	?	(0)
2019–2021	Dinaz Vyshhorod	22	(1)
2023–	Shturm Ivankiv		
- * Club domestic league appearances and goals as of 21:17, 29 August 2019 (UTC)

Roman Pomazan (Ukrainian: Роман Максимович Помазан; born 5 September 1994) is a Ukrainian football defender who plays for Dinaz Vyshhorod.

== Early life ==
Roman Pomazan was born on 5 September 1994 in Berdiansk, Zaporizhia Oblast, Ukraine.

== Career ==
Pomazan is a product of youth team system of Azovstal Mariupol. His first trainer was Eduard Bondarenko.

Made his debut for FC Metalurh in the match against FC Chornomorets Odesa on 15 May 2015 in the Ukrainian Premier League.

In 2019, Pomazan joined Armenian club FC Yerevan.
