= Bohdan Orynchak =

Ukrainian football midfielder

Personal information
- Full name: Bohdan Mykolayovych Orynchak
- Date of birth: 10 September 1993 (age 33)
- Place of birth: Nyzhniy Strutyn, Ivano-Frankivsk Oblast, Ukraine
- Height: 1.81 m (5 ft 11 in)
- Position: Right winger

Team information
- Current team: Probiy Horodenka
- Number: 10

Youth career
- 2007–2010: DYuSSh-3 Naftokhimik Ivano-Frankivsk

Senior career*
| Years | Team | Apps | (Gls) |
| 2013 | Chechva Nyzhniy Strutyn | 3 | (2) |
| 2014 | Perehinske | 18 | (2) |
| 2015–2019 | Prykarpattia Ivano-Frankivsk | 120 | (39) |
| 2020 | Rukh Lviv | 1 | (0) |
| 2020 | → Mynai (loan) | 8 | (3) |
| 2020–2021 | Volyn Lutsk | 27 | (11) |
| 2021–2022 | Polissya Zhytomyr | 10 | (0) |
| 2022 | Prykarpattia Ivano-Frankivsk | 11 | (2) |
| 2023 | Dinaz Vyshhorod | 8 | (2) |
| 2023–2024 | Zviahel | 20 | (5) |
| 2024– | Probiy Horodenka | 40 | (18) |

International career
| 2015–2016 | Ivano-Frankivsk Oblast | | |
- * Club domestic league appearances and goals as of 4 June 2026

Bohdan Mykolayovych Orynchak (Ukrainian: Богдан Миколайович Оринчак; born 10 September 1993) is a Ukrainian professional footballer who plays as a right winger for Ukrainian club Probiy Horodenka.

== Career ==
Orynchak is a product of the Ivano-Frankivsk city Youth Sportive School System.

He made his professional debut for FC Prykarpattia in the away game against FC Arsenal-Kyivshchyna Bila Tserkva on 24 July 2016 in the Ukrainian Second League scoring a goal to make the score 3–0. The game would eventually end 6–0 thrashing.

On 27 November 2018 Orynchak was recognized as the best player in November 2018 by PFL.
