= Ivan Sondey =

Ukrainian footballer

Personal information
- Full name: Ivan Stepanovych Sondey
- Date of birth: 15 January 1994 (age 32)
- Place of birth: Holyn, Ivano-Frankivsk Oblast, Ukraine
- Height: 1.70 m (5 ft 7 in)
- Position: Midfielder

Team information
- Current team: Probiy Horodenka
- Number: 11

Youth career
- 2007–2008: Prykarpattia Ivano-Frankivsk
- 2008: BRW-VIK Volodymyr-Volynskyi
- 2008–2011: Dynamo Kyiv

Senior career*
Years	Team	Apps	(Gls)
2012	Kalush	10	(1)
2012–2014	Dnipro Dnipropetrovsk	0	(0)
2014–2017	Naftovyk-Ukrnafta Okhtyrka	70	(11)
2017–2019	Olimpik Donetsk	42	(1)
2019	Mykolaiv	17	(1)
2020–2023	Prykarpattia Ivano-Frankivsk	64	(7)
2023–2024	Probiy Horodenka	29	(13)
2024–	Probiy Horodenka	26	(4)

International career
2010	Ukraine-16	10	(1)
- * Club domestic league appearances and goals as of 27 December 2025

Ivan Sondey (Ukrainian: Іван Степанович Сондей; born 15 January 1994) is a professional Ukrainian football midfielder who plays for Probiy Horodenka.

== Career ==
Sondey is a product of the different youth sportive school systems.

He played in the team of a regional level FC Kalush, but in July 2012 signed his contract with the professional FC Dnipro and then with the FC Naftovyk-Ukrnafta Okhtyrka in the Ukrainian First League.
