= Danylo Kolesnyk =

Ukrainian footballer

Personal information
- Full name: Danylo Ihorovych Kolesnyk
- Date of birth: 22 September 2001 (age 25)
- Place of birth: Kyiv, Ukraine
- Height: 1.88 m (6 ft 2 in)
- Position: Centre-forward

Team information
- Current team: Rebel Kyiv
- Number: 23

Youth career
- 2014–2015: Arsenal Kyiv
- 2015–2016: Monolit Kyiv
- 2016–2018: Arsenal Kyiv

Senior career*
Years	Team	Apps	(Gls)
2018–2019	Arsenal Kyiv	0	(0)
2019	Vorskla Poltava	0	(0)
2020	MSM Academy Prague	1	(1)
2021	Kolos Kovalivka	0	(0)
2021–2022	VPK-Ahro Shevchenkivka	13	(0)
2022–2023	Mynai	16	(0)
2024	Druzhba Myrivka	9	(2)
2024	Livyi Bereh Kyiv	1	(0)
2025	Kolos-2 Kovalivka	22	(10)
2026–	Rebel Kyiv	2	(1)
- * Club domestic league appearances and goals as of 24 October 2024

Danylo Ihorovych Kolesnyk (Ukrainian: Данило Ігорович Колесник; born 22 September 2001) is a Ukrainian professional footballer who plays as a centre-forward for Rebel Kyiv.
