= Bohdan Hora =

Ukrainian footballer

Personal information
- Full name: Bohdan Oleksandrovych Hora
- Date of birth: 3 November 2002 (age 24)
- Place of birth: Kirovohrad, Ukraine
- Height: 1.74 m (5 ft 9 in)
- Position: Left winger

Team information
- Current team: Bukovyna Chernivtsi

Youth career
- 2013–2019: Zirka Kropyvnytskyi
- 2019: Dnipro

Senior career*
Years	Team	Apps	(Gls)
2019–2022	Dnipro-1	0	(0)
2021–2022	→ Nikopol (loan)	19	(4)
2022–2023	Mariupol	22	(0)
2023–2024	Hirnyk-Sport Horishni Plavni	25	(3)
2024–	Bukovyna Chernivtsi	0	(0)
- * Club domestic league appearances and goals as of 3 July 2024

Bohdan Oleksandrovych Hora (Ukrainian: Богдан Олександрович Гора; born 3 November 2002) is a Ukrainian professional footballer who plays as a left winger for Ukrainian First League club Bukovyna Chernivtsi.
