= FC Revera 1908 Ivano-Frankivsk =

- Full name: Football Club Revera 1908 Ivano-Frankivsk
- Founded: 2020
- Manager: Yaroslav Matviiv
- League: none
- 2024–25: Ukrainian Second League, Group A, 9th of 10 (withdrew)

FC Revera 1908 Ivano-Frankivsk is a Ukrainian football club from Ivano-Frankivsk, Ivano-Frankivsk Oblast.

In 2024 it was admitted to the Ukrainian Second League. The club was formed in 2020 based on the Prykarpattia Football Academy that debuted at national level in 2023 as FAPF Ivano-Frankivsk.

The club is created in memory of the Polish club Rewera Stanisławów that existed in 1908–1939.

== Current squad ==
As of 16 October 2024

Note: Flags indicate national team as defined under FIFA eligibility rules; some limited exceptions apply. Players may hold more than one non-FIFA nationality.

No.	Pos.	Nation	Player
2	DF	UKR	Kostyantyn Shkolnyi
3	DF	UKR	Yevheniy Debelko
4	DF	UKR	Vasyl Burtnyk
5	DF	UKR	Vadym Konovalov
6	MF	UKR	Maksym Andrusyak
7	MF	UKR	Oleksandr-Ivan Pashchak
9	MF	UKR	Yevhen Danylyuk
10	DF	UKR	Taras Boyko
11	FW	UKR	Dmytro Shostak
12	GK	UKR	Dmytro Bezkorovaynyi
13	FW	UKR	Andriy Demyanchuk
14	MF	UKR	Andriy Bezzub

No.	Pos.	Nation	Player
17	MF	UKR	Ihor Neledva
18	FW	UKR	Dmytro Humenyak
20	MF	UKR	Andriy Drekalo
21	DF	UKR	Bohdan Maksymenko
22	FW	UKR	Maksym Uhrynyuk
23	GK	UKR	Volodymyr Sharun
26	MF	UKR	Artem Tsurupin
42	MF	UKR	Oleksiy Shvets
48	DF	UKR	Artur Yanata
72	GK	UKR	Dmytro Kosach
73	DF	UKR	Pavlo Salvarovskyi
75	DF	UKR	Hlib Popchuk
