= Artem Nedolya =

Ukrainian footballer (born 1993)

Personal information
- Full name: Artem Oleksandrovych Nedolya
- Date of birth: 20 October 1993 (age 33)
- Place of birth: Kyiv, Ukraine
- Height: 1.77 m (5 ft 9 1/2 in)
- Position: Midfielder

Youth career
- 2000–2007: Kyiv
- 2007–2008: Atlet Kyiv
- 2009: Arsenal Kyiv
- 2009–2010: Zirka Kyiv

Senior career*
Years	Team	Apps	(Gls)
2011–2014	Sevastopol	1	(0)
2011–2013	→ Sevastopol-2	53	(3)
2014	Olimpik Donetsk	1	(0)
2015–2016	Poltava	46	(1)
2017	Sumy	14	(2)
2017–2018	Poltava	18	(1)
2018–2019	Polissya Zhytomyr	24	(0)
2019	Kremin Kremenchuk	3	(0)
2020	Lviv	3	(0)
2024	Druzhba Myrivka	10	(2)
2024–	Kolos-2 Kovalivka	9	(2)
- * Club domestic league appearances and goals as of 3 July 2024

Artem Nedolya (Ukrainian: Артем Олександрович Недоля; born 20 October 1993) is a Ukrainian football who plays as a midfielder.

Nedolya is a product of Kyiv's different Youth Sportive Schools. His first trainer was Viktor Hryschenko. In 2011, he signed a contract with FC Sevastopol, playing 53 games for the club by 2013.
