= Volodymyr Kovalyuk =

Ukrainian footballer and coach

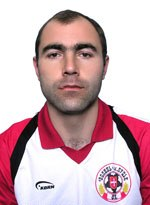
- Volodymyr Kovalyuk

Personal information
- Full name: Volodymyr Vasylyovych Kovalyuk
- Date of birth: 3 March 1972 (age 54)
- Place of birth: Kosiv, Ukrainian SSR, Soviet Union
- Height: 1.84 m (6 ft 1/2 in)
- Positions: Defender; midfielder

Youth career
- 1989: Elektroosnastka Kolomyia

Senior career*
Years	Team	Apps	(Gls)
1990	Karpaty Lviv	2	(0)
1991–1992	Karpaty Kamyanka-Buzka / Skala Stryi	37	(4)
1992	Karpaty Lviv	19	(1)
1993	Skala Stryi	37	(1)
1994–1995	Prykarpattya Ivano-Frankivsk	49	(6)
1995	Dnipro Dnipropetrovsk	12	(2)
1996–1997	Uralan Elista	62	(11)
1998	Dynamo Kyiv	3	(0)
1998	→ Dynamo-2 Kyiv	14	(0)
1998	Shakhtar Donetsk	6	(1)
1998	→ Shakhtar-2 Donetsk	4	(1)
1999–2001	Prykarpattya Ivano-Frankivsk	64	(3)
1999	→ Enerhetyk Burshtyn (loan)	1	(0)
1999–2001	→ Prykarpattia-2 Ivano-Frankivsk	7	(1)
2001	Kuban Krasnodar	2	(0)
2001–2002	Prykarpattya Ivano-Frankivsk	30	(3)
2002	→ LUKOR Kalush (loan)	6	(0)
2003	Kryvbas Kryvyi Rih	12	(0)
2003–2004	Borysfen Boryspil	37	(0)
2005–2006	Volyn Lutsk	33	(1)
2007	Dnipro Cherkasy	13	(0)
2007–2010	Volyn Lutsk	83	(0)
2010	Prykarpattya Ivano-Frankivsk	15	(0)
Total		523	(33)

Managerial career
- 2012: Enerhetyk Burshtyn
- 2012: Karpaty Yaremche
- 2016–2020: Prykarpattia Ivano-Frankivsk
- * Club domestic league appearances and goals

Volodymyr Vasylyovych Kovalyuk (Ukrainian: Володимир Васильович Ковалюк, born on 3 March 1972) is a Ukrainian football coach and former player who played as a defender and midfielder who has previously played for Karpaty Lviv, Dnipro Dnipropetrovsk, Dynamo Kyiv and FC Shakhtar Donetsk.

After retiring from active football playing, Kovalyuk was appointed on 16 February 2012 as the head coach of the FC Enerhetyk Burshtyn in the Ukrainian First League.
