= Probiy Arena =

Stadium in Ukraine

- Probiy
- Interactive map of Probiy Arena
- Location: Horodenka, Ukraine
- Coordinates: 48°39′33″N 25°30′26″E
- Capacity: 2,500
- Surface: Grass
- Field size: 105 m × 74 m (344 ft × 243 ft)

Construction
- Opened: 1932
- Renovated: 2011

Tenant
- FC Probiy Horodenka

Probiy Arena is a football stadium in Horodenka, Ukraine. It is the main stadium of the city of Horodenka, Ivano-Frankivsk Oblast. The stadium is the home arena of the football club Probiy Horodenka.

The stadium was put into operation in 1932. The stadium's capacity at that time was 600 seats. Reconstruction of the stadium took place in 2011. After the reconstruction, during which plastic seats were installed, the number of spectator seats increased to 2,500.
