= FC Probiy Horodenka =

Probiy Пробій
- Full name: Football Club Probiy Horodenka
- Founded: 1924; 102 years ago
- Ground: Probiy Arena, Horodenka
- Capacity: 2,500
- Manager: Volodymyr Kovalyuk
- League: Ukrainian First League
- 2024–25: Second League, 1st
- Website: https://nkprobiy.if.ua/
Home colours	Away colours

Football Club Probiy Horodenka (Ukrainian: Футбольний клуб Пробій Городенка) is a Ukrainian professional football team from a small city of Horodenka in Prykarpattia. The club currently plays in Ukrainian First League, the Ukrainian second tier of football league.

== History ==
The club was established back in 1924 in the Second Polish Republic as one of Ukrainian sports organizations. It participated in lower-level competitions of the Lwów District League or separate Ukrainian sports events. Following occupation of eastern parts of Poland by the Soviet troops in 1939, all existing clubs were liquidated and replaced with "proletarian" sports organizations (Spartak, Dynamo, DO, others). In Horodenka was created a team of the agricultural sports organization "Kolos" which was named Tsukrovyk originally and later Kolos and Dnister. During the Soviet period the team did not record any significant achievements at regional level and never participated in competitions beyond those that were organized between the collectives of physical culture (KFK).

In the beginning of 1990s, the club returned to its original name. During the 1993–94 season Probiy places second behind Naftovyk Dolyna at the Ivano-Frankivsk football championship. In 1995 and 1996 the club reached finals of the regional football cup competition where twice met with Pokuttia Kolomyia and beating them at the 1996 cup final in extra time. Finally in 1998–99 and 2001 Probiy managed to become champions of the Ivano-Frankivsk Oblast (Prykarpattia).

At the national level Probiy debuted in 1994.

== Honours ==
Ukrainian Second League

- Winners (1): 2024–25

Ukrainian Amateur Football Championship

- Runner-up (1): 2023–24

== Current squad ==
As of 10 September 2026

Note: Flags indicate national team as defined under FIFA eligibility rules; some limited exceptions apply. Players may hold more than one non-FIFA nationality.

No.	Pos.	Nation	Player
2	DF	UKR	Volodymyr Radulskyi
4	DF	UKR	Artur Kozachuk
5	DF	UKR	Volodymyr Savchyn
6	MF	UKR	Volodymyr Ivanychuk
7	MF	UKR	Andrii Savitskyi
8	MF	UKR	Bohdan Dryhan
9	FW	UKR	Matviy Burenko
10	MF	UKR	Bohdan Orynchak
12	GK	UKR	Volodymyr Barabanov
13	DF	UKR	Valentyn Halonskyi (on loan from Shakhtar Donetsk U21)
14	MF	UKR	Kyrylo Matvyeyev
15	MF	UKR	Ruslan Kharuk
16	DF	UKR	Ihor Huk

No.	Pos.	Nation	Player
18	MF	UKR	Andriy Bliznichenko
19	FW	UKR	Valentyn Napuda (on loan from Nyva Ternopil)
21	FW	UKR	Maksym Hirnyi
25	GK	UKR	Maksym Kovalenko
30	FW	UKR	Orest Lepskyi (on loan from LNZ Cherkasy)
31	GK	UKR	Kyrylo Arkhypchuk
44	DF	UKR	Maryan Bats (on loan from Nyva Ternopil)
56	DF	UKR	Maksym Borysenko
70	MF	UKR	Stanislav Yaroshenko (on loan from Zorya Luhansk)
95	DF	UKR	Maksym Lopyryonok
98	MF	UKR	Andriy Fesenko
99	FW	UKR	Danylo Honcharuk

=== Out on loan ===
Note: Flags indicate national team as defined under FIFA eligibility rules; some limited exceptions apply. Players may hold more than one non-FIFA nationality.

No.	Pos.	Nation	Player
90	DF	UKR	Vladyslav Babanin (at Skala Stryi until 31 December 2026)

== League and cup history ==
Season	Div.	Pos.	Pl.	W	D	L	GS	GA	P	Domestic Cup	Europe		Notes
1994–95	4th Group 2 (Amateur Championship)	3_{/13}	24	15	2	7	32	20	47	-	-	-	withdrew
1995–2023	competed at regional level												
2023–24	4th Group 1 (Amateur Championship)	5_{/11}	20	7	8	5	27	21	29	-	-	-	Admitted to Druha Liha
2024–25	3rd"A" (Second League)	1/20	18	13	2	3	42	15	41	1/8 finals	-	-	The league's play-offs:Kolos-2 Kovalivka 1:0 2:3 (3-3) (4-3p) Promotion to FL
2025–26	2nd (First League)	8/16	30	10	6	14	29	37	36	1/32 finals	-	-	-
2026–27	2nd (First League)	16/16	6	0	2	4	4	18	2	1/16 finals	-	-	TBD

== Presidents and nachalniki ==
- 2012 Stepan Chyzhevskyi (president)
- 2022– Vitaliy Shevaha (president)
- 2023– Volodymyr Dumanskyi (nachalnik)
- 2023– Volodymyr Borysevych (sports director)

== Head coaches ==
- 2012 Ihor Melnychuk
- 2023–2026 Volodymyr Kovalyuk
- 2026– Yuriy Virt
