= 2025–26 FC Lisne season =

Ukrainian football team season

Lisne
2025–26 season
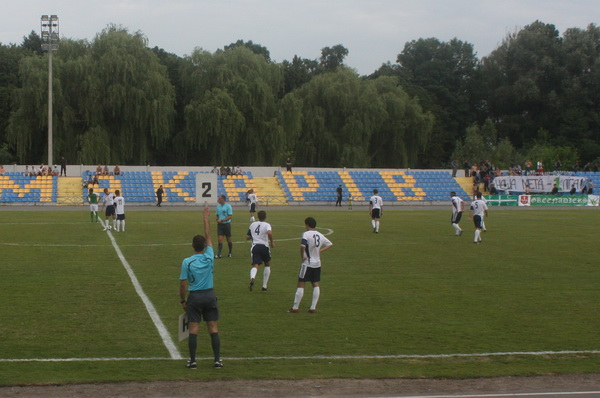
- Owner: Oleksandr Meshkov
- Chairman: Viktor Zelensky
- Manager: Oleksandr Ryabokon (until October 2025); Vadym Melnyk (from October 2025 until now)
- Stadium: Tsentralnyi Stadion
- Ukrainian Second League: 4th
- Ukrainian Cup: Round of 16
- Top goalscorer: League: Nazar Voloshyn (13 goals); All: Nazar Voloshyn (13 goals)
- Highest home attendance: 352 (vs Bukovyna-2 Chernivtsi, 16 August 2025)
- Biggest win: FC Lisne 4-1 Real Pharma Odesa; FC Lisne 4-1 Skala 1911 Stryi
- Biggest defeat: FC Lisne 1-5 Polissya-2 Zhytomyr
Home colours	Away colours
- All statistics correct as of 8 November 2025.

During the 2025–26 season, FC Lisne competed in the Ukrainian Second League.

== Season summary ==
This was the first time the club competed in the Ukrainian Second League. The club used the Tsentralnyi Stadion in Makariv. As coach was appointed Oleksandr Ryabokon who replaced Denys Skepskyi. In July 2025 the club signed few important players such us Ihor Soldat, Vladyslav Ohirya and Illya Karavashchenko on loan from Kudrivka. On 25 August 2025, the club won the first match in Ukrainian Cup against Chaika Petropavlivska Borshchahivka at the Kolos training field in Sofiivska Borshchahivka. On 13 September 2025 FC Lisne acquired Vikentiy Voloshyn. On 23 September, 2025, the club won their second match of the Ukrainian Cup against Olympiya Savyntsi, reaching the round of 16 of the Ukrainian Cup for the first time. Despite good results in the Ukrainian Second League and the Ukrainian Cup, coach Oleksandr Ryabokon confirmed rumours about the financial problems the club is experiencing, but assured that it will at least finish the first round of the season. In a recent interview, director Viktor Zelinsky confirmed that due to financial problems, head coach Oleksandr Ryabokon has resigned from his position as manager and is about to become the head coach of Livyi Bereh Kyiv. His place will be taken by Vadym Melnyk, the current assistant coach. On 19 October 2025 the match against FC Uzhhorod was not played as Lisne could not travel to Uzhhorod, due to financial problems. On 28 October 2025, FC Lisne was eliminated in the round of 16 of the Ukrainian Cup by FC Chernihiv on penalties at the Chernihiv Arena. In November 2025, following the club's financial problems and the club's elimination from the Ukrainian Cup, Serhiy Rybalka retired from professional football.

On 16 November 2025 a second match against Vilkhivtsi was not played as Lisne didn't show up for the match due to financial problems. After the second missed match, the club was eliminated from the Ukrainian Second League without the possibility of returning the following season.

== Players ==
=== Squad information ===
As of 18 January 2026

Squad no.	Name	Nationality	Position	Date of birth (age)
Goalkeepers
1	Pavlo Kravtsov	(Ukraine)	GK	30 November 2000 (aged 24)
24	Vladyslav Zakorskyi	(Ukraine)	GK	17 February 2000 (aged 25)
25	Illya Karavashchenko (on loan from Kudrivka)	(Ukraine)	GK	25 June 2001 (aged 24)
Defenders
4	Ihor Soldat	(Ukraine)	DF	1 October 1998 (aged 26)
15	Sergiy Boryshpolets	(Ukraine)	DF	15 April 2003 (aged 22)
23	Oleksandr Nasonov	(Ukraine)	DF	28 April 1992 (aged 33)
27	Oleksandr Sayenko	(Ukraine)	DF	10 October 2003 (aged 21)
Midfielders
5	Andriy Chepurnyi	(Ukraine)	MF	8 September 2002 (aged 22)
6	Maksym Kuba	(Ukraine)	MF	5 July 1991 (aged 34)
7	Vladyslav Ohirya	(Ukraine)	MF	3 April 1990 (aged 35)
8	Yaroslav Dobrokhotov	(Ukraine)	MF	1 November 2000 (aged 24)
10	Oleksandr Kalinin	(Ukraine)	MF	22 March 2002 (aged 23)
11	Serhiy Shestakov	(Ukraine)	MF	12 April 1990 (aged 35)
13	Illya Kovalenko	(Ukraine)	MF	23 July 2001 (aged 23)
14	Ivan Kotukha	(Ukraine)	MF	4 April 2005 (aged 20)
17	Serhiy Rybalka (captain)	(Ukraine)	MF	1 April 1992 (aged 33)
19	Denys Harmash	(Ukraine)	MF	19 April 1990 (aged 35)
22	Edvard Kobak	(Ukraine)	MF	22 April 2002 (aged 23)
28	Kyrylo Frolov	(Ukraine)	MF	2 September 2008 (aged 16)
29	Zakhar Titarenko	(Ukraine)	MF	8 April 2008 (aged 17)
33	Artem Kozlov	(Ukraine)	MF	10 February 1997 (aged 28)
60	Daniil Yushko (on loan from Obolon Kyiv U-19)	(Ukraine)	MF	8 January 2005 (aged 20)
91	Oleh Yankovskyi	(Ukraine)	MF	2 January 2001 (aged 24)
99	Vikentiy Voloshyn	(Ukraine)	MF	17 April 2001 (aged 24)
Forwards
9	Nazar Voloshyn	(Ukraine)	FW	4 September 2000 (aged 24)
20	Oleh Lyha	(Ukraine)	FW	27 May 1999 (aged 26)
66	Yehor Korsun	(Ukraine)	FW	2 September 2002 (aged 22)
86	Dmytro Hryshchenko	(Ukraine)	FW	8 November 2001 (aged 23)

== Management team ==
Position	Name	Year appointed	Last club/team
Manager	(Ukraine) Oleksandr Ryabokon	2025	Dinaz Vyshhorod
Manager	(Ukraine) Vadym Melnyk	2025-	Lisne (Assistant coach)
Assistant Manager	(Ukraine) Denys Skepskyi	2025-	Lisne (coach)
Goalkeeping Coach	(Ukraine) Stanislav Tyshchenko	2025-	Lokomotyv Kyiv (Goalkeeping Coach)

== Transfers ==
=== In ===
Date	Pos.	Player	Age	Moving from	Type	Fee	Source
Summer
22 July 2025	DF	(Ukraine) Ihor Soldat	34	Free Agent	Transfer	Free	
22 July 2025	DF	(Ukraine) Vladyslav Ohirya	35	Free Agent	Transfer	Free	
20 July 2025	MF	(Ukraine) Serhiy Rybalka	35	Free Agent	Transfer	Free	
24 July 2025	GK	(Ukraine) Vladyslav Zakorskyi	25	(Ukraine) Lokomotyv Kyiv	Transfer	Free	
24 July 2025	MF	(Ukraine) Artem Kozlov	28	(Ukraine) Metalurh	Transfer	Free	
24 July 2025	MF	(Ukraine) Edvard Kobak	23	(Ukraine) Kulykiv-Bilka	Transfer	Free	
25 July 2025	MF	(Ukraine) Daniil Yushko	20	(Ukraine) Obolon Kyiv U-19	Loan	Free	
14 August 2025	GK	(Ukraine) Illya Karavashchenko	24	(Ukraine) Kudrivka	Loan	Free	
14 August 2025	MF	(Ukraine) Kyrylo Frolov	17	(Ukraine) Polissya-2 Zhytomyr	Transfer	Free	
5 September 2025	MF	(Ukraine) Zakhar Titarenko	17	(Ukraine) Polissya-2 Zhytomyr	Transfer	Free	
7 September 2025	MF	(Ukraine) Ivan Kotukha	25	(Ukraine) Dynamo Kyiv U-19	Transfer	Free	
13 September 2025	MF	(Ukraine) Vikentiy Voloshyn	24	(Ukraine) Dynamo Kyiv	Transfer	Free	

=== Out ===
Date	Pos.	Player	Age	Moving from	Type	Fee	Source
Summer
30 June 2025	MF	(Ukraine) Volodymyr Koval	33	Unattached	Released	Free	
9 July 2025	DF	(Russia) Andrei Vasyanovich	37	Retired	Released	Free	
9 July 2025	GK	(Ukraine) Georgi Kopaliani	31	Unattached	Released	Free	
9 July 2025	GK	(Ukraine) Oleksiy Mayboroda	30	Unattached	Released	Free	
9 July 2025	FW	(Ukraine) Kostyantyn Bezyazychnyi	33	Unattached	Released	Free	
4 August 2025	GK	(Ukraine) Roman Pazenko	29	(Ukraine) Polissya Stavky	Transfer	Free	
4 August 2025	MF	(Ukraine) Oleh Chobotar	27	(Ukraine) Avanhard Lozova	Transfer	Free	
4 August 2025	MF	(Ukraine) Oleksiy Yakovenko	25	(Ukraine) Avanhard Lozova	Transfer	Free	
13 November 2025	MF	(Ukraine) Serhiy Rybalka	35	Retired	Released	Free	
Winter
31 November 2025	MF	(Ukraine) Serhiy Rybalka	35	Retired	Transfer	Free	
2 December 2025	MF	(Ukraine) Denys Harmash	35	Unattached	Transfer	Free	
11 December 2025	FW	(Ukraine) Nazar Voloshyn	26	(Ukraine) Livyi Bereh Kyiv	Transfer	Free	
12 December 2025	MF	(Ukraine) Illya Kovalenko	23	(Ukraine) Livyi Bereh Kyiv	Transfer	Free	
12 December 2025	MF	(Ukraine) Andriy Chepurnyi	22	(Ukraine) Livyi Bereh Kyiv	Transfer	Free	
12 December 2025	MF	(Ukraine) Vikentiy Voloshyn	24	(Ukraine) Livyi Bereh Kyiv	Transfer	Free	
31 December 2026	MF	(Ukraine) Daniil Yushko	25	(Ukraine) Obolon Kyiv U-19	Loan Return	Free	
5 January 2026	GK	(Ukraine) Illya Karavashchenko	24	(Ukraine) Kudrivka	Loan Return	Free	
15 January 2026	FW	(Ukraine) Serhiy Shestakov	35	(Ukraine) Kolos-2 Kovalivka	Transfer	Free	
13 February 2027	MF	(Ukraine) Edvard Kobak	23	(Ukraine) Vilkhivtsi	Transfer	Free	
18 February 2026	MF	(Ukraine) Oleksandr Kalinin	23	(Ukraine) Livyi Bereh Kyiv	Transfer	Free	
18 February 2026	MF	(Ukraine) Ivan Kotukha	20	(Ukraine) Livyi Bereh Kyiv	Transfer	Free	
27 February 2026	DF	(Ukraine) Sergiy Boryshpolets	22	(Czech Republic) Varnsdorf	Transfer	Free	
4 March 2026	MF	(Ukraine) Kyrylo Frolov	17	(Ukraine) Lokomotyv Kyiv U-19	Transfer	Free	
7 March 2026	MF	(Ukraine) Zakhar Titarenko	17	(Ukraine) Lokomotyv Kyiv U-19	Transfer	Free	
18 March 2026	MF	(Ukraine) Yaroslav Dobrokhotov	25	(Ukraine) Viktoriya Sumy	Transfer	Free	
25 March 2026	DF	(Ukraine) Ihor Soldat	35	(Ukraine) Bucha	Transfer	Free	
31 March 2026	DF	(Ukraine) Oleksandr Nasonov	34	(Ukraine) Bratslav Vinnytsya	Transfer	Free	
1 April 2026	MF	(Ukraine) Artem Kozlov	29	(Ukraine) Bucha	Transfer	Free	
1 April 2026	FW	(Ukraine) Oleh Lyha	26	(Ukraine) Bucha	Transfer	Free	
1 April 2026	FW	(Ukraine) Dmytro Hryshchenko	23	(Ukraine) Bucha	Transfer	Free	
3 April 2026	GK	(Ukraine) Vladyslav Zakorskyi	25	(Ukraine) SC Korosten Agro-Nyva	Transfer	Free	

== Pre-season and friendlies ==
Win Draw Loss

13 July 2025	Livyi Bereh-2 Kyiv	1–1	Lisne	Zolochivska hromada
EEST (UTC+3)		Report	Shestakov 22'	Stadium: Arena Livyi Bereh

14 July 2025	Dynamo Kyiv U19	1–2	Lisne	Kyiv
EEST (UTC+3)		Report	Rybalka (pen.); Chepurnyi	Stadium: Dynamo Training Center

19 July 2025	Lisne	4–0	Polissya Zhytomyr-U19	Makariv
EEST (UTC+3)	Rybalka 35' (pen.); Voloshyn 67'; Hryshchenko 81'; Dobrokhotov 85'	Report		Stadium: Tsentralnyi Stadion

20 July 2025	Dinaz Vyshhorod	0–2	Dinaz Vyshhorod	Lyutizh
EEST (UTC+3)	Voloshyn; Voloshyn	Report		Stadium: Dinaz Stadium

8 September 2025	Dynamo Kyiv	4–0	Lisne
EEST (UTC+3)	Yarmolenko 14', 29'; Vivcharenko 51'; Pikhalyonok 60'	Report

== Competitions ==
=== Overall ===
Competition	First match	Last match	Record							
Competition	First match	Last match	Pld	W	D	L	GF	GA	GD	Win %
Second League	26 July 2025	8 November 2025	15	8	3	4	31	27	+4	53.33
Cup	25 August 2025	28 October 2025	3	2	0	1	7	2	+5	66.67
Total			18	10	3	5	38	29	+9	55.56

Last updated: 6 January 2026
Source: Competitions

=== First League ===
==== League table ====
Pos	Team	Pld	W	D	L	GF	GA	GD	Pts	Promotion, qualification or relegation
1	Kulykiv-Bilka (C, P)	30	21	5	4	58	18	+40	68	Promotion to Ukrainian First League
2	Polissya-2 Zhytomyr (P)	30	18	9	3	69	22	+47	63	Promotion to Ukrainian First League
3	Nyva Vinnytsia	30	15	6	9	42	32	+10	51	
4	Sambir-Nyva-2 Ternopil	30	16	2	12	30	43	−13	50	
5	Atlet Kyiv	30	14	4	12	45	48	−3	46	
6	Uzhhorod	30	13	5	12	40	37	+3	44 (Note: Ranked on head-to-head points: Uzhhorod 6, Skala 1911 Stryi 3.)	
7	Skala 1911 Stryi	30	13	5	12	62	48	+14	44	
8	Vilkhivtsi	30	12	5	13	50	46	+4	41	
9	Lisne (D)	30	8	3	19	32	30	+2	27	Expelled (Note: Lisne was expelled from the league after Round 19 for failing to appear to two matches (against Uzhhorod in R14 and Vilkhivtsi in R19). All their remaining fixtures were awarded technical results –:+ against them.)
10	Bukovyna-2 Chernivtsi	30	7	6	17	31	57	−26	27	
11	Real Pharma Odesa	30	1	4	25	18	96	−78	7	

Source: PFL.ua
Rules for classification: 1) Points; 2) Head-to-head points; 3) Head-to-head goal difference; 4) Head-to-head goals scored; 5) Goal difference in all games; 6) Goals scored in all games (Note: calculation by criteria indicated in rules 2, 3, 4 is conducted with consideration of all teams that have equal number of tournament points at the moment of calculation and not only among those which after preliminary criteria have appeared more successful).
(C) Group winner; (D) Disqualified; (P) Promoted
Notes:

Pos	Team	Pld	W	D	L	GF	GA	GD	Pts	Promotion, qualification or relegation
1	Lokomotyv Kyiv (C, P)	30	22	4	4	65	16	+49	70	Promotion to Ukrainian First League
2	Kolos-2 Kovalivka (P)	30	21	6	3	64	22	+42	69	Promotion to Ukrainian First League
3	Chaika Petropavlivska Borshchahivka	30	17	6	7	58	41	+17	57	
4	Rebel Kyiv	30	15	5	10	34	27	+7	50	
5	Livyi Bereh-2 Kyiv	30	13	9	8	50	28	+22	48	
6	Trostianets	30	13	8	9	46	31	+15	47	
7	Oleksandriya-2	30	12	8	10	37	32	+5	44	
8	Chornomorets-2 Odesa	30	5	9	16	25	56	−31	24	
9	Dinaz Vyshhorod	30	5	4	21	26	62	−36	19	
10	Penuel Kryvyi Rih	30	3	8	19	27	64	−37	17	
11	Hirnyk-Sport Horishni Plavni	30	3	5	22	20	73	−53	14	

Source: PFL.ua
Rules for classification: 1) Points; 2) Head-to-head points; 3) Head-to-head goal difference; 4) Head-to-head goals scored; 5) Goal difference in all games; 6) Goals scored in all games (Note: calculation by criteria indicated in rules 2, 3, 4 is conducted with consideration of all teams that have equal number of tournament points at the moment of calculation and not only among those which after preliminary criteria have appeared more successful).
(C) Champions; (P) Promoted

Both groups' winners were expected to play each other for the season's title. Also, both these teams gained a direct promotion to the 2026–27 Ukrainian First League. At the same time, both groups' runners-up were expected to play among themselves for the season's third place and to play against the 13th- and 14th-placed teams in the Persha Liha (First League) for promotion. Later, promotion-relegation play-offs were cancelled.

Both matches, the league's final and third-place match, were played in a single-leg format and on a neutral field. A draw determined the hosting team for each match, which took place on May 15.

Third place final

Team 1	Score	Team 2
FC Kolos-2 Kovalivka	1 – 0	Polissya-2 Zhytomyr

27 May 2026	FC Kolos-2 Kovalivka	1:0	Polissya-2 Zhytomyr	Cherkasy
14:00	Taranukha 36'	Report		Stadium: Cherkasy Arena; Attendance: 30; Referee: Yevhen Makarenko (Cherkasy)

League's final

Team 1	Score	Team 2
FC Lokomotyv Kyiv	1 – 2	Kulykiv-Bilka

31 May 2026	FC Lokomotyv Kyiv	1:2	Kulykiv-Bilka	Khmelnytskyi
14:00	Mordas 55'	Report	Panasyuk 48'; Volkov 87'	Stadium: Sport Complex Podillia; Attendance: 500; Referee: Artem Hordynskyi (Vinnytsia)

==== Results summary ====
Overall								Home						Away					
Pld	W	D	L	GF	GA	GD	Pts	W	D	L	GF	GA	GD	W	D	L	GF	GA	GD
15	8	3	4	34	22	+12	27	5	2	1	20	10	+10	3	1	3	14	12	+2

Last updated: 8 November 2025.
Source: Competitive matches

==== Results by round ====
Round	1	2	3	4	5	6	7	8	9	10	11	12	13	14	15	16	17	18	19	20	21	22	23	24	25	26	27	28	29	30
Ground	H	A	H	A	H	A	H	A	H	A	A	H	A	H	A	H	A	H	A											
Result	W	D	D	W	W	W	W	L	W	L	L	L	L	D	W	W	L	L	L											
Position	1	2	3	2	2	2	2	3	1	2	3	4	5	6	4	4	5	6	7											

Updated to match(es) played on 30 November 2025. Source: Competitive matches
A = Away; H = Home; W = Win; D = Draw; L = Loss

==== Matches ====
26 July 2025 1	FC Lisne	3–0	Atlet Kyiv	Makariv
15:30 EEST (UTC+03:00)		Report		Stadium: Tsentralnyi Stadion

2 August 2025 2	Polissya-2 Zhytomyr	1–1	FC Lisne	Zhytomyr
15:30 EEST (UTC+03:00)		Report		Attendance: 80; Referee: Oleh Olkhovskyi

10 August 2025 3	FC Lisne	1–1	Uzhhorod	Makariv
15:30 EEST (UTC+03:00)		Report	Tsentralnyi Stadion	Attendance: 300; Referee: Roman Halitsyn

16 August 2025 4	Bukovyna-2 Chernivtsi	0–2	FC Lisne	Bukovyna
15:30 EEST (UTC+03:00)		Report		Stadium: Bukovyna Stadium; Attendance: 353; Referee: Ivan Mandziuk

29 August 2025 5	FC Lisne	4–1	Real Pharma Odesa	Makariv
15:30 EEST (UTC+03:00)		Report		Stadium: Tsentralnyi Stadion; Attendance: 50; Referee: Vladyslav Orendochka

2 September 2025 6	Skala Stryi	1–2	FC Lisne	Stryi
15:30 EEST (UTC+03:00)		Report		Stadium: Sokil Stadium; Attendance: 300; Referee: Rostislav Molnar

14 September 2025 7	FC Lisne	3–1	Vilkhivtsi	Makariv
15:30 EEST (UTC+03:00)		Report		Stadium: Tsentralnyi Stadion; Attendance: 0 Referee: Vitaly Solovyov

19 September 2025 8	Nyva Vinnytsia	1–0	FC Lisne	Vinnytsia
15:30 EEST (UTC+03:00)		Report		Stadium: Nyva training base Attendance: 100; Referee: Artem Artemenko

29 September 2025 9	FC Lisne	3–2	Nyva-2 Ternopil	Makariv
15:30 EEST (UTC+03:00)		Report		Stadium: Tsentralnyi Stadion; Referee: Oleksandr Tytov

4 October 2025 10	Kulykiv-Bilka	3–0	FC Lisne	Kulykiv
15:30 EEST (UTC+03:00)		Report		Stadium: Arena Kulykiv; Attendance: 200

8 October 2025 11	Atlet Kyiv	3–2	FC Lisne	Kyiv
15:30 EEST (UTC+03:00)		Report		Stadium: DYuSSh Atlet; Referee: Artem Hordynsky

12 October 2025 12	FC Lisne	1–5	Polissya-2 Zhytomyr	Makariv
15:30 EEST (UTC+03:00)		Report		Stadium: Tsentralnyi Stadion

19 October 2025 13	Uzhhorod	Match not played	FC Lisne	Uzhhorod
15:30 EEST (UTC+03:00)		Report		Stadium: Avanhard Stadium

24 October 2025 14	FC Lisne	2–2	Bukovyna-2 Chernivtsi	Makariv
15:30 EEST (UTC+03:00)		Report		Stadium: Tsentralnyi Stadion; Attendance: 50; Referee: Oleh Olkhovskyi

1 November 2025 15	Real Pharma Odesa	1–3	FC Lisne	Odessa
15:30 EEST (UTC+03:00)		Report		Stadium: Ivan Odessa; Referee: Artem Artemenko

8 November 2025 16	FC Lisne	4–1	Skala 1911 Stryi	Kyiv
15:30 EEST (UTC+03:00)		Report		Stadium: Bannikov Stadium; Referee: Oleksandr Tytov

16 November 2025 17	Vilkhivtsi	Match not played	FC Lisne	Vilkhivtsi
15:30 EEST (UTC+03:00)		Report		Stadium: Vilkhivtsi Arena

23 November 2025 18	FC Lisne	Match not played	Nyva Vinnytsia	Makariv
15:30 EEST (UTC+03:00)		Report		Stadium: Tsentralnyi Stadion

29 November 2025 19	Sambir-Nyva-2 Ternopil	Match not played	FC Lisne	Vilkhivtsi
15:30 EEST (UTC+03:00)				Stadium: Vilkhivtsi Arena

21 March 2026 20	FC Lisne	x–x	Kulykiv-Bilka	Makariv
15:30 EEST (UTC+03:00)				Stadium: Tsentralnyi Stadion

=== Ukrainian Cup ===
25 August 2025 Round of 64 (1/32)	Chaika	0–4	Lisne	Sofiivska Borshchahivka
EEST (UTC+3)		Report	Kalinin 8'; Kobak 27', 39' (pen.); Kovalenko 50'	Stadium: Kolos training field Referee: Ye.Makarenko (Sumy)

23 September 2025 Round of 32 (1/16)	Olympiya Savyntsi	1–2	Lisne	Myrhorod
EEST (UTC+3)	Bychkov (yellow card) 11'; Pochernin (yellow card) 25'; Malyk 49'	Report	Rybalka 11' (pen.); Voloshyn 79'; Harmash (yellow card) 82'; Voloshyn (yellow card) 58' (yellow-red card) 85'	Stadium: Start

28 October 2025 Round of 16 (1/8)	Chernihiv	1–1 (4–3 p)	Lisne	Chernihiv
EEST (UTC+3)	Shushko (yellow card) 11'; Shumylo (yellow card) 36'; Bybik (yellow card) 37'; Romanchenko 77' (pen.); Tatarenko (yellow card) 89'; Stolyarchuk (yellow card) 90'	Report	Rybalka 90+3' (pen.)	Stadium: Chernihiv Arena; Attendance: 210; Referee: Nazariy Gyorgy
	Penalties
	Romanchenko (penalty missed); ̈Porokhnya (penalty scored); ̈Shumylo (penalty scored); ̈Chaban (penalty scored); ̈Novikov (penalty scored)		̈Voloshyn (penalty missed); ̈Harmash (penalty scored); ̈Rybalka (penalty scored); ̈Kovalenko (penalty scored); ̈Hryshchenko (penalty missed)

== Statistics ==
=== Appearances and goals ===
No.	Pos	Nat	Player	Total		Ukrainian Premier League		Ukrainian Cup		Play-offs	
No.	Pos	Nat	Player	Apps	Goals	Apps	Goals	Apps	Goals	Apps	Goals
Goalkeepers
1	GK	(Ukraine) UKR	Pavlo Kravtsov	7	0	6	0	1	0	0	0
Defenders
7	DF	(Ukraine) UKR	Vladyslav Ohirya	1	0	1	0	0	0	0	0
23	DF	(Ukraine) UKR	Oleksandr Nasonov	9	0	8	0	1	0	0	0
27	DF	(Ukraine) UKR	Oleksandr Sayenko	5	0	4	0	1	0	0	0
29	DF	(Ukraine) UKR	Zakhar Titarenko	1	0	1	0	0	0	0	0
Midfielders
6	MF	(Ukraine) UKR	Maksym Kuba	3	0	3	0	0	0	0	0
91	MF	(Ukraine) UKR	Oleh Yankovskyi	3	0	3	0	0	0	0	0
Forwards
66	FW	(Ukraine) UKR	Yehor Korsun	0	0	0	0	0	0	0	0
Players transferred out during the season
4	DF	(Ukraine) UKR	Ihor Soldat	9	1	8	1	1	0	0	0
5	MF	(Ukraine) UKR	Andriy Chepurnyi	12	0	10	0	2	0	0	0
8	MF	(Ukraine) UKR	Yaroslav Dobrokhotov	13	1	11	1	2	0	0	0
9	FW	(Ukraine) UKR	Nazar Voloshyn	14	13	12	13	2	0	0	0
10	MF	(Ukraine) UKR	Oleksandr Kalinin	17	7	15	6	2	1	0	0
11	MF	(Ukraine) UKR	Serhiy Shestakov	14	2	12	2	2	0	0	0
13	MF	(Ukraine) UKR	Illya Kovalenko	15	2	12	1	3	1	0	0
14	MF	(Ukraine) UKR	Ivan Kotukha	11	0	9	0	2	0	0	0
15	DF	(Ukraine) UKR	Sergiy Boryshpolets	14	0	11	0	3	0	0	0
17	MF	(Ukraine) UKR	Serhiy Rybalka	15	4	13	3	2	1	0	0
19	MF	(Ukraine) UKR	Denys Harmash	11	0	9	0	2	0	0	0
20	FW	(Ukraine) UKR	Oleh Lyha	14	0	12	0	2	0	0	0
22	MF	(Ukraine) UKR	Edvard Kobak	12	3	10	1	2	2	0	0
24	GK	(Ukraine) UKR	Vladyslav Zakorskyi	2	0	2	0	0	0	0	0
25	GK	(Ukraine) UKR	Illya Karavashchenko	9	0	7	0	2	0	0	0
28	MF	(Ukraine) UKR	Kyrylo Frolov	3	0	3	0	0	0	0	0
29	MF	(Ukraine) UKR	Zakhar Titarenko	1	0	1	0	0	0	0	0
33	MF	(Ukraine) UKR	Artem Kozlov	12	0	10	0	2	0	0	0
60	MF	(Ukraine) UKR	Daniil Yushko	10	1	7	1	3	0	0	0
86	FW	(Ukraine) UKR	Dmytro Hryshchenko	11	1	9	1	2	0	0	0
99	MF	(Ukraine) UKR	Vikentiy Voloshyn	10	2	9	1	1	1	0	0

Source: Competitions

Last updated: 3 April 2026

=== Goalscorers ===
Rank	No.	Pos	Nat	Name	Second League	Cup	Play-offs	Total
1	9	FW	(Ukraine)	Nazar Voloshyn	13	0	0	13
2	10	MF	(Ukraine)	Oleksandr Kalinin	6	1	0	7
3	17	MF	(Ukraine)	Serhiy Rybalka	4	2	0	6
4	22	MF	(Ukraine)	Edvard Kobak	1	2	0	3
5	11	FW	(Ukraine)	Serhiy Shestakov	2	0	0	2
6	99	MF	(Ukraine)	Vikentiy Voloshyn	1	1	0	2
7	13	MF	(Ukraine)	Illya Kovalenko	1	1	0	2
8	86	FW	(Ukraine)	Dmytro Hryshchenko	1	0	0	1
9	60	MF	(Ukraine)	Daniil Yushko	1	0	0	1
10	8	MF	(Ukraine)	Yaroslav Dobrokhotov	1	0	0	1
11	4	DF	(Ukraine)	Ihor Soldat	1	0	0	1
				Total	32	7	0	39

Last updated: 8 November 2025

=== Clean sheets ===
Rank	No.	Pos	Nat	Name	Second League	Cup	Play-offs	Total
1	1	GK	(Ukraine)	Pavlo Kravtsov	2	0	0	2
2	25	GK	(Ukraine)	Illya Karavashchenko	0	1	0	1
				Total	2	1	0	3

Last updated: 3 September 2025

=== Disciplinary record ===
No.	Pos	Nat	Player	First League			Ukrainian Cup			Play-offs			Total		
No.	Pos	Nat	Player	Booked	(yellow card) (yellow-red card)	Sent off (straight red)	Booked	(yellow card) (yellow-red card)	Sent off (straight red)	Booked	(yellow card) (yellow-red card)	Sent off (straight red)	Booked	(yellow card) (yellow-red card)	Sent off (straight red)
23	DF	(Ukraine)	Oleksandr Nasonov	3	0	0	0	0	0	0	0	0	3	0	0
99	MF	(Ukraine)	Vikentiy Voloshyn	2	0	0	1	1	0	0	0	0	3	1	0
20	FW	(Ukraine)	Oleh Lyha	2	0	0	0	0	0	0	0	0	2	0	0
15	DF	(Ukraine)	Sergiy Boryshpolets	2	0	0	0	0	0	0	0	0	2	0	0
8	MF	(Ukraine)	Yaroslav Dobrokhotov	2	0	0	0	0	0	0	0	0	2	0	0
17	MF	(Ukraine)	Serhiy Rybalka	2	0	0	0	0	0	0	0	0	2	0	0
19	MF	(Ukraine)	Denys Harmash	1	0	0	1	0	0	0	0	0	2	0	0
22	MF	(Ukraine)	Edvard Kobak	1	0	0	0	0	0	0	0	0	1	0	0
33	MF	(Ukraine)	Artem Kozlov	1	0	0	0	0	0	0	0	0	1	0	0
13	MF	(Ukraine)	Illya Kovalenko	1	0	0	0	0	0	0	0	0	1	0	0
10	MF	(Ukraine)	Oleksandr Kalinin	1	0	0	0	0	0	0	0	0	1	0	0
5	MF	(Ukraine)	Andriy Chepurnyi	1	0	0	0	0	0	0	0	0	1	0	0
			Total	19	0	2	1	0	0	0	0	0	21	1	0

Last updated: 4 November 2025
