= 2025–26 Ukrainian Second League =

Ukrainian Second League
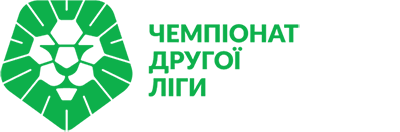
- Season: 2025–26
- Dates: 26 July 2025 – 24 May 2026 (winter break: 1 December 2025 – 20 March 2026); 27 May – 31 May 2026 (play-offs)
- Champions: Kulykiv-Bilka
- Promoted: Kulykiv-Bilka; Lokomotyv Kyiv; Kolos-2 Kovalivka; Polissya-2 Zhytomyr
- Matches: 224
- Goals: 655 (2.92 per match)
- Top goalscorer: Roman Heresh (20 goals)
- Biggest home win: Livyi Bereh-2 8–0 Chaika (24 May 2026)
- Biggest away win: Real Pharma 0–6 Skala 1911 (17 August 2025); Real Pharma 0–6 Polissia-2 (21 March 2026)
- Highest scoring: Kolos-2 8–1 Hirnyk-Sport (17 November 2025)
- Longest winning run: 7 matches Chaika
- Longest unbeaten run: 17 matches Polissya-2
- Longest winless run: 25 matches Real Pharma
- Longest losing run: 11 matches Real Pharma
- Highest attendance: 538; Bukovyna-2 2–0 Real Pharma (2 August 2025)
- Total attendance: 22,644
- Average attendance: 162
- All statistics correct as of 30 March 2026. Play-off statistics are not included.

The 2025–26 Ukrainian Second League is the 35th since its establishment. Due to regular airstrikes by the Russian Armed Forces, restrictions were implemented for attendance, with many games being played without spectators.

On 17 June 2025, the 35th PFL Conference determined the general composition of the competition and its format. As in the previous season, the competitions were planned to be held in two groups, split geographically, with one group consisting of 11 teams and another 12. The conference approved admission of 4 amateur teams from the AAFU competition and 3 teams from various junior competitions. Five teams decided to withdraw their participation in the third-tier competition.

The competitions were determined to start on 26 July 2025 and consist of a triple round robin format with two rounds held in summer-fall and one more in spring. It was also decided to preserve the post-season mini-tournaments, such as the first-place and third-place match-ups, as well as promotion/relegation between the first and the second leagues.

== Teams ==
=== Promoted teams ===
Four teams have been promoted from the 2024–25 Ukrainian Football Amateur League:

- Atlet Kyiv – 2nd place of Group 2 (debut)
- FC Lisne – 1st place of Group 1 (debut)
- Penuel Kryvyi Rih – 8th place of Group 2 (debut)
- Rebel Kyiv – 4th place of Group 2 (debut)

Three second teams have been added:

- Livyi Bereh-2 Kyiv – (debut, formed based on Livyi Bereh U-19 that competed in the Ukrainian Premier League last season)
- Bukovyna-2 Chernivtsi – (debut, formed based on Bukovyna U-19 that competed in the DYuFLU competitions last season)
- Chornomorets-2 Odesa – (returning, last competed in the 2019–20 season, formed based on Chornomorets U-19 that competed in the Ukrainian Premier League)

=== Relegated teams ===
Two teams were relegated from the 2024–25 Ukrainian First League.

- Kremin Kremenchuk – 17th placed (returning, after six seasons)
- Dinaz Vyshhorod – 16th placed (returning, after three seasons)

=== Expelled and withdrawn teams ===
- Kremin Kremenchuk - received a "temporary inactive status" by the Professional Football League
- Revera 1908 Ivano-Frankivsk - received a "temporary inactive status" by the Professional Football League
- Due to the withdrawal of FC Mynai less than two weeks before the start of the competitions, the relegation of Metalurh Zaporizhzhia was reverted; thereby, the Group B participation pool and calendar where Metalurh was drawn in were adjusted accordingly.
- On 21 November 2025, FC Lisne was expelled with just three matches left in the second round-robin after the club failed to arrive at another game. At the time of disqualification, FC Lisne played 17 games, out of which it won 8, tied 3, and lost 6 with 32 goals scored and 30 conceded.

=== Location map and stadiums ===
Home venues of teams in the 2025–26 Ukrainian Second League
— Group A — Group B
Home venues of teams in the 2025–26 Ukrainian Second League in Kyiv and Kyiv Oblast

==== Stadiums ====
Group A

Team	Stadium (Note: Minimum capacity of stadium for the Second League is 500 spectators.)	Position in 2024–25
Skala 1911 Stryi	Sokil Sokil, Lviv Olimpiya, Chernivtsi	3rd
Kulykiv-Bilka	Arena Kulykiv	4th
Polissya-2 Zhytomyr	club's training field, Hlybochytsia	5th
Uzhhorod	Avanhard	6th
Vilkhivtsi	Vilkhivtsi Arena	7th
Sambir-Nyva-2 Ternopil	imeni Brovarskoho, Sambir	8th
Nyva Vinnytsia	Nyva training base	9th (Group B)
Real Pharma Odesa	Ivan	10th
Lisne	Tsentralnyi imeni Brukvenka, Makariv imeni Bannikova, Kyiv	AM
Atlet Kyiv	Atlet Livyi Bereh training complex (artificial field #4)	AM
Bukovyna-2 Chernivtsi	Bukovyna imeni Tonkocheyeva, Kamianets-Podilskyi Olimpiya	—

Group B

Team	Stadium	Position in 2023–24
Dinaz Vyshhorod	Dinaz Stadium, Demydiv	1L
Kolos-2 Kovalivka	Tsentralnyi imeni Melnyka, Obukhiv Tsentralnyi imeni Brukvenka, Makariv Arsenal Arena, Shchaslyve Arsenal Arena (indoor), Shchaslyve	1st
Lokomotyv Kyiv	imeni Bannikova Arsenal Arena (indoor), Shchaslyve	3rd
Oleksandriya-2	Olimp Nika-plius	4th
Hirnyk-Sport Horishni Plavni	Yunist	5th
Trostianets	imeni Kutsa	6th
Chaika	Kolos training field, S.Borshchahivka Tsentralnyi imeni Brukvenka, Makariv	7th
Rebel Kyiv	imeni Bannikova Livyi Bereh training complex (artificial field #4)	AM
Penuel Kryvyi Rih	imeni Povoroznyuka, Volodymyrivka	AM
Chornomorets-2 Odesa	Complex "Lyustdorf", Lymanka	—
Livyi Bereh-2 Kyiv	Livyi Bereh training complex Livyi Bereh training complex (artificial field #4)	—

Notes:

- [—] – The dash sign indicates that the club was admitted to the Second League without participation in the AAFU championship last season.
- 1L – indicates participants of the 2024–25 Ukrainian First League
- Am – indicates participants of the 2024–25 AAFU championship

== Managers ==
Club	Head coach	Replaced coach
Atlet Kyiv	Dmytro Murashenko	
Bukovyna-2 Chernivtsi	Dmytro Yefimov	
Chaika Petropavlivska Borshchahivka	Vadym Khokhlov	
Chornomorets-2 Odesa	Denys Kolchin	Anatoliy Didenko
Dinaz Vyshhorod	Oleksandr Holovko	
Hirnyk-Sport Horishni Plavni	Dmytro Palapa	(Serbia) Jovan Markoski
Kulykiv-Bilka	Serhiy Atlasyuk	
Kolos-2 Kovalivka	Artem Starhorodskyi	
Lisne	Vadym Melnyk	Oleksandr Ryabokon
Livyi Bereh-2 Kyiv	Vyacheslav Nivinskyi	
Lokomotyv Kyiv	Serhiy Karpenko	
Nyva Vinnytsia	Yuriy Yaroshenko	
Sambir-Nyva-2 Ternopil	Roman Marych	
Oleksandriya-2	Viktor Bytsiura	Volodymyr Sharan
Penuel Kryvyi Rih	Ihor Solodenko	
Polissya-2 Zhytomyr	Oleksandr Maksymov	
Real Pharma Odesa	Valentyn Poltavets (caretaker)	
Rebel Kyiv	Maksym Demskyi	
Skala 1911 Stryi	Oleksandr Stepanov	Roman Hnativ (Note: Since 22 October 2025, Mykola Vasylyshyn (assistant manager) led Skala 1911 due to the medical absence of Hnativ.)
Trostianets	Yuriy Bakalov	
Uzhhorod	Yaromyr Loboda	
Vilkhivtsi	Oleksandr Semerenko	

=== Managerial changes ===
Team	Outgoing head coach	Manner of departure	Date of vacancy	Table	Incoming head coach	Date of appointment
Bukovyna-2 Chernivtsi	new team			Pre-season	Dmytro Yefimov	16 June 2025
Chaika Petropavlivska Borshchahivka	Ihor Lutsenko	End of contract	30 May 2025	Pre-season	Vadym Khokhlov	15 June 2025
Kolos-2 Kovalivka	Volodymyr Bondarenko	Sacked	9 June 2025	Pre-season	Artem Starhorodskyi	9 June 2025
Chornomorets-2 Odesa	Andriy Ushchapovskyi	Change of role	9 June 2025	Pre-season	Anatoliy Didenko	9 June 2025
Livyi Bereh-2 Kyiv	Andriy Havryushov	Made the club's manager	10 June 2025	Pre-season	Vyacheslav Nivinskyi	30 June 2025
Lokomotyv Kyiv	Nazar Kozak (acting)	Change of role	27 June 2025	Pre-season	Serhiy Karpenko	27 June 2025
SC Vilkhivtsi	Oleksiy Zorin	End of contract	1 July 2025	Pre-season	Oleksandr Semerenko	1 July 2025
Polissya-2 Zhytomyr	Kishan Hautam	End of contract	1 July 2025	Pre-season	Oleksandr Maksymov	1 July 2025
Hirnyk-Sport Horishni Plavni	Valeriy Kutsenko	Signed with Vorskla	2 July 2025	Pre-season	(Serbia) Jovan Markoski	2 July 2025
FC Lisne	Denys Skepskyi	Change of role	9 July 2025	Pre-season	Oleksandr Ryabokon	9 July 2025
FC Lisne	Oleksandr Ryabokon	Left for Livyi Bereh	6 October 2025	3rd (Group A)	Vadym Melnyk	6 October 2025
FC Oleksandriya-2	Viktor Bytsiura	Change of role	2 October 2025	5th (Group B)	Volodymyr Sharan	3 October 2025
Chornomorets-2 Odesa	Anatoliy Didenko	Swapped for FC Seasters	8 January 2026	8th (Group B)	Denys Kolchin	16 January 2026
Skala 1911 Stryi	Roman Hnativ	Dismissed (no details)	7 February 2026	5th (Group A)	Oleksandr Stepanov	17 March 2026
Hirnyk-Sport Horishni Plavni	(Serbia) Jovan Markoski	Signed with Radnički Ob.	29 January 2026	9th (Group B)	Dmytro Palapa	20 March 2026
FC Oleksandriya-2	Volodymyr Sharan	Signed with Oleksandriya	23 March 2026	5th (Group B)	Viktor Bytsiura	24 March 2026

== Group A league table ==
Pos	Team	Pld	W	D	L	GF	GA	GD	Pts	Promotion, qualification or relegation
1	Kulykiv-Bilka (C, P)	30	21	5	4	58	18	+40	68	Promotion to Ukrainian First League
2	Polissya-2 Zhytomyr (P)	30	18	9	3	69	22	+47	63	Promotion to Ukrainian First League
3	Nyva Vinnytsia	30	15	6	9	42	32	+10	51	
4	Sambir-Nyva-2 Ternopil	30	16	2	12	30	43	−13	50	
5	Atlet Kyiv	30	14	4	12	45	48	−3	46	
6	Uzhhorod (Note: FC Uzhhorod temporarily withdrew their first team from competition due to financial issues.)	30	13	5	12	40	37	+3	44 (Note: Ranked on head-to-head points: Uzhhorod 6, Skala 1911 Stryi 3.)	Withdrawn after the season
7	Skala 1911 Stryi	30	13	5	12	62	48	+14	44	
8	Vilkhivtsi	30	12	5	13	50	46	+4	41	
9	Lisne (D)	30	8	3	19	32	30	+2	27	Expelled (Note: Lisne was expelled from the league after Round 19 for failing to appear in two matches (against Uzhhorod in R14 and Vilkhivtsi in R19). All their remaining fixtures were awarded technical results –:+ against them.)
10	Bukovyna-2 Chernivtsi (Note: Bukovyna Chernivtsi announced that it withdraws their second team from the competition for the next season due to revival of the UPL under-21 competitions.)	30	7	6	17	31	57	−26	27	Withdrawn after the season
11	Real Pharma Odesa (Note: Real Pharma Odesa announced that it withdraws from professional competition and the next season will participate in the amateur competitions.)	30	1	4	25	18	96	−78	7	Withdrawn after the season

Source: PFL.ua
Rules for classification: 1) Points; 2) Head-to-head points; 3) Head-to-head goal difference; 4) Head-to-head goals scored; 5) Goal difference in all games; 6) Goals scored in all games (Note: calculation by criteria indicated in rules 2, 3, 4 is conducted with consideration of all teams that have equal number of tournament points at the moment of calculation and not only among those which after preliminary criteria have appeared more successful).
(C) Group winner; (D) Disqualified; (P) Promoted

=== Group A results ===
Home \ Away	ATL	BC2	KUL	LIS	NYV	PZ2	RPO	NT2	SKL	UZH	VLX	ATL	BC2	KUL	LIS	NYV	PZ2	RPO	NT2	SKL	UZH	VLX
Atlet Kyiv		2–0	1–2	3–2	1–1	1–4	4–2	0–1	3–0	2–0	1–0				+:– (Note: Technical losses to Lisne. On 21 November 2025, after Lisne forfeited the Round 19 match against Vilkhivtsi, which was the second no show of the season, the Ukrainian Association of Football (UAF) announced that FC Lisne is expelled from professional competitions for failing to appear to two league matches. All their remaining fixtures (including those of the third round-robin) were awarded technical results –:+.)	1–1	0–0	4–0				3–2
Bukovyna-2 Chernivtsi	1–2		3–2	0–2	1–4	1–0	2–0	1–2	1–1	0–4	1–3	1–3				0–2	0–2	2–1			2–4	
Kulykiv-Bilka	2–1	1–0		3–0	2–2	1–1	4–0	1–2	3–0	4–1	1–0	2–0	2–2			1–2	1–1				1–0	
Lisne	3–0	2–2	–:+ (Note: Technical losses to Lisne. On 21 November 2025, after Lisne forfeited the Round 19 match against Vilkhivtsi, which was the second no show of the season, the Ukrainian Association of Football (UAF) announced that FC Lisne is expelled from professional competitions for failing to appear to two league matches. All their remaining fixtures were awarded technical results –:+.)		–:+	1–5	4–1	3–2	4–1	1–1	3–1		–:+	–:+					–:+	–:+	–:+	
Nyva Vinnytsia	1–2	0–0	0–2	1–0		0–2	3–0	0–1	1–2	0–3	3–1 (Note: Due to the exclusion of FC Lisne and the cancellation of the Lisne vs Nyva match, Nyva Vinnytsia played early (on 22 November 2025 instead of 29 November) a home game with FC Vilkhivtsi, which had a bye for the Round 20 and happened to be their next opponent in the Round 21. Coincidentally, it became the last game for Nyva Vinnitsia this year.)				+:–		1–1	3–0		1–1		1–0
Polissya-2 Zhytomyr	6–0	1–0	0–0	2–2	2–1		4–2	0–0	2–3	2–1	1–1				+:–			5–0	2–0	3–0		1–2
Real Pharma Odesa	0–2	2–2	0–4	1–3	0–5	0–6		1–2	0–6	1–1	3–5			0–3	+:–				0–2	0–0		1–5 (Note: Since Vilkhivtsi had a bye in Round 28 and Real Pharma was supposed to play against Lisne, which withdrew earlier, both teams, Vilkhivtsi and Real Pharma, played each other in their Round 30 match, ahead of schedule.)
Sambir-Nyva-2	2–0	1–0	1–0	+:–	0–1	0–3	4–0		1–4	1–0	0–2	3–1	0–2	0–5		0–3					1–3	
Skala 1911 Stryi	3–4	3–4	0–2	1–2	6–1	1–3	3–0	1–1		1–2	4–1	3–1	4–1	0–3					5–1		1–2	
Uzhhorod	3–1	2–1	0–2	3–0 (Note: Technical loss to Lisne for failing to appear to the match.)	0–2	0–3	3–0	0–1	0–2		2–0	0–0				2–0	0–4	2–2				0–1
Vilkhivtsi	3–2	1–1	1–2	3–0 (Note: Technical loss to Lisne for failing to appear to the match. It was the second no show, which eventually led to team's exclusion from the league.)	1–2	3–3	3–1	0–1	0–5	1–1			4–0	0–2	+:–				5–0	1–1		

Source: pfl.ua (in Ukrainian)
Legend: Blue = home team win; Yellow = draw; Red = away team win.
Notes:

Additional notes:

=== Group A results by week ===
Team ╲ Round	1	2	3	4	5	6	7	8	9	10	11	12	13	14	15	16	17	18	19	20	21	22	23	24	25	26	27	28	29	30
Atlet Kyiv	L	W	W	L	L	L	L	W	W	W	W	L	D	L	L	L	W	W	W	W	W	D	W	W	W	L	D	L	D	L
Bukovyna2	W	W	L	D	L	L	W	L	W	L	D	D	D	L	D	L	L	L	L	L	W	L	L	L	W	L	L	W	D	L
Kulykiv	W	D	L	W	D	W	L	W	W	W	W	W	L	W	D	W	W	W	W	W	D	W	L	W	W	W	W	W	D	W
Lisne	W	D	D	W	W	W	W	L	W	L	L	L	L	D	W	W	L	L	L	L	L	L	L	L	L	L	L	L	L	L
Nyva	L	D	L	L	L	W	W	L	W	W	W	L	D	L	W	D	W	L	W	W	W	W	W	W	D	W	D	D	W	L
Polissya2	W	D	D	W	W	D	W	W	L	W	L	W	D	W	D	D	W	W	W	W	W	D	W	D	W	D	W	W	L	W
Real Ph	D	L	L	L	L	L	L	L	L	L	L	D	L	L	L	L	L	L	L	L	L	L	L	D	L	W	L	D	L	L
Sambir-N2	W	W	W	L	W	W	W	L	L	L	L	W	W	D	W	W	W	D	W	W	L	W	L	L	L	L	W	W	L	L
Skala1911	L	W	L	W	L	W	W	W	L	L	W	L	D	W	L	W	W	D	L	L	L	D	W	D	L	L	W	D	W	W
Uzhhorod	D	L	D	W	W	L	L	W	L	W	W	W	W	D	L	L	L	L	L	W	W	D	W	L	W	D	L	L	W	W
Vilkhivtsi	L	L	D	L	D	W	L	L	L	W	L	W	D	D	W	W	L	W	L	L	L	D	L	W	W	W	W	L	W	W

Source: pfl.ua
W = Win; D = Draw; L = Loss

Notes: In this table, starting from the Round of 20 for FC Lisne, all their matches were awarded as technical losses (-:+), while their opponents received technical victories (+:-).

=== Group A goalscorers ===
As of 24 May 2026

Rank	Scorer	Team	Goals (Pen.)
1	Danyil Volkov	Kulykiv-Bilka	17 (0)
2	Rostyslav Babych	Atlet Kyiv	16 (1)
3	(Republic of the Congo) Jerry Yoka	Polissya-2 Zhytomyr	14 (0)
4	1 player(s)		13
5	1 player(s)		12
6	1 player(s)		10
7	1 player(s)		9
8	6 player(s)		8
14	5 player(s)		7
19	3 player(s)		6
22	8 player(s)		5
30	14 player(s)		4
44	15 player(s)		3
59	30 player(s)		2
89	61 player(s)		1
0	own goal(s)		14

- Own goals: Yevhen Moroz (Nyva Vinnytsia vs Bukovyna-2), Valeriy Hayvanenko (Real Pharma Odesa vs Vilkhivtsi), Denys Harkavenko (Skala 1911 Stryi vs Atlet), Kiril Kobernyuk (Polissya-2 Zhytomyr vs Skala 1911), Artur Zahorulko (Nyva Vinnytsia vs Polissya-2), Dmytro Niemchaninov (Vilkhivtsi vs Bukovyna-2), Vladyslav Mudrak [Shvets] (Real Pharma Odesa vs Nyva), Artemiy Sharnin (Real Pharma Odesa vs Polissya-2), Nazar Zaichenko (Real Pharma Odesa vs Polissya-2), Maksym Tereshchenko (Uzhhorod vs Skala 1911), Volodymyr Matusevych (Sambir-Nyva-2 Ternopil vs Kulykiv-Bilka), Marat Dzyubin (Bukovyna-2 Chernivtsi vs Atlet), Dmytriy Skochelyas (Bukovyna-2 Chernivtsi vs Vilkhivtsi), Dmytro Niemchaninov ({2} Vilkhivtsi vs Kulykiv-Bilka)

=== Hat-tricks ===
As of 29 March 2026

Player	For	Against	Result	Date
Nazar Voloshyn	FC Lisne	Real Pharma Odesa	4–1 (H)	29 August 2025
Vladyslav Pohorilyi	Nyva Vinnytsia	Bukovyna-2 Chernivtsi	4–1 (A)	3 September 2025
Nazar Voloshyn	FC Lisne	Skala 1911 Stryi	4–1 (H)	8 November 2025
Vladyslav Mendruk	Sambir-Nyva-2	Real Pharma Odesa	4–0 (H)	17 November 2025
Ivan Romanchuk	Polissya-2 Zhytomyr	Real Pharma Odesa	5–0 (H)	29 March 2026

== Group B league table ==
Pos	Team	Pld	W	D	L	GF	GA	GD	Pts	Promotion, qualification or relegation
1	Lokomotyv Kyiv (C, P)	30	22	4	4	65	16	+49	70	Promotion to Ukrainian First League
2	Kolos-2 Kovalivka (P)	30	21	6	3	64	22	+42	69	Promotion to Ukrainian First League
3	Chaika Petropavlivska Borshchahivka (Note: Chaika Petropavlivska Borshchahivka announced they are stopping their participation in professional competitions temporarily.)	30	17	6	7	58	41	+17	57	Withdrawn after the season
4	Rebel Kyiv (Note: Initially, Rebel Kyiv had their license for the next season denied. Less than a month later, Rebel was readmitted for the 2026–27 season.)	30	15	5	10	34	27	+7	50	
5	Livyi Bereh-2 Kyiv	30	13	9	8	50	28	+22	48	Withdrawn after the season
6	Trostianets	30	13	8	9	46	31	+15	47	
7	Oleksandriya-2	30	12	8	10	37	32	+5	44	
8	Chornomorets-2 Odesa	30	5	9	16	25	56	−31	24	Withdrawn after the season
9	Dinaz Vyshhorod	30	5	4	21	26	62	−36	19	
10	Penuel Kryvyi Rih	30	3	8	19	27	64	−37	17	
11	Hirnyk-Sport Horishni Plavni (Note: Hirnyk-Sport Horishni Plavni temporarily withdrew due to financial issues.)	30	3	5	22	20	73	−53	14	Withdrawn after the season

Source: PFL.ua
Rules for classification: 1) Points; 2) Head-to-head points; 3) Head-to-head goal difference; 4) Head-to-head goals scored; 5) Goal difference in all games; 6) Goals scored in all games (Note: calculation by criteria indicated in rules 2, 3, 4 is conducted with consideration of all teams that have equal number of tournament points at the moment of calculation and not only among those which after preliminary criteria have appeared more successful).
(C) Champions; (P) Promoted

=== Group B results ===
Home \ Away	CPB	CH2	DIN	HIS	KK2	LB2	LOK	OL2	PEN	RBL	TRO	CPB	CH2	DIN	HIS	KK2	LB2	LOK	OL2	PEN	RBL	TRO
Chaika Petropavlivska Borshchahivka		3–3	5–0	3–2	1–1	1–2	0–2	1–1	3–2	2–1	1–2		4–0			1–1				3–0	0–2	4–1
Chornomorets-2 Odesa	2–4		2–1	0–0	0–3	1–1	0–3 (Note: Administrative score (technical loss to Chornomorets-2). The Round 20 match Chornomorets-2 – Lokomotyv original result, 3:3 draw, was annulled and Chornomorets-2 received a technical loss as it violated foreigners limit when it had too many foreign players on the field at the same time (more than three). In the 38th minute, the injured Ukrainian Yevheniy Ryazantsev was substituted for Brazilian João Neto while Chornomorets-2 already had three foreign players on the field.)	1–1	2–2	2–0	0–2			0–1	1–0			0–5	2–1		0–2	
Dinaz Vyshhorod	0–1 (Note: The Round 7 match Dinaz–Chaika, that was scheduled to take place on September 8, was postponed to September 9, 2025, due to an air raid alert. The game was interrupted midway through the second half with Chaika ahead 0:1 and Dinaz playing one man down. Resumed the next day, the game result did not change.)	2–0		0–2	1–3	0–2	1–3	0–4	2–2	0–1	1–4	0–2			4–0	0–3	0–0					2–3
Hirnyk-Sport Horishni Plavni	0–5	1–1	0–1		1–1	1–4	0–2	1–2	3–2	0–2	0–3	0–1				1–1	0–2			2–3		1–1
Kolos-2 Kovalivka	3–1	2–0	2–1	8–1		2–1	1–1	3–1	2–0	1–0	3–0		4–0					1–1	2–5	5–0	4–1	
Livyi Bereh-2 Kyiv	2–3	3–0	4–0	3–0	0–1		0–2	1–1	1–1	0–0	0–0	8–0	2–1			0–1				2–0		1–1
Lokomotyv Kyiv	1–1	2–0	4–0	4–0	0–2	3–2		1–2	5–0	0–1	1–0	1–1		2–0	6–0		3–0					1–0
Oleksandriya-2	2–1	1–1	1–0	1–0	0–1	0–0	0–2		1–0	1–2	2–1	1–2		1–0	1–2		2–3	0–1				
Penuel Kryvyi Rih	0–1 (Note: The Round 1 match Penuel–Chaika, that was scheduled to take place on July 26, was postponed to August 20, 2025.)	2–2	2–2	2–0	0–1	0–1	0–4	1–1		2–3	0–2		0–4	4–2				0–2	1–1		1–1	
Rebel Kyiv	0–1	1–0	1–1	2–0	2–0	1–0	0–1	0–1	1–0		0–0			0–3 (Note: The Round 27 match, Rebel vs Dinaz, that took place on April 19 ended in a tie (1:1). After reviewing the match materials, the UAF CDC adopted a decision to award a technical victory (3:0) to Dinaz and a technical loss (0:3) to Rebel (for fielding a player who was not on the referee's report).)	4–0		1–2	1–2	1–0			
Trostianets	1–2	0–0	4–1	3–2	2–1	2–2	3–0	1–1	3–0 (Note: The Round 2 match Trostianets–Penuel, that was scheduled to take place on August 3, was suspended by an extended air raid alarm at the moment, when Trostianets was ahead 3–0, and postponed. The match was rescheduled, resumed and took place next day, on August 4, 2025.)	1–1			3–0			0–1 (Note: The Round 25 match Trostianets vs Kolos-2, that was scheduled to take place on April 8, was suspended by an extended air raid alarm at halftime, when both teams tied at 0, and postponed. The match was played on May 13.)			0–1	2–0	1–2	

Source: pfl.ua (in Ukrainian)
Legend: Blue = home team win; Yellow = draw; Red = away team win.
Notes:

Additional notes:

=== Group B results by week ===
Team ╲ Round	1	2	3	4	5	6	7	8	9	10	11	12	13	14	15	16	17	18	19	20	21	22	23	24	25	26	27	28	29	30
Chaika	D	D	L	W	L	W	W	L	W	W	W	L	L	W	D	W	D	W	W	W	W	W	W	W	D	D	W	W	L	L
Chornomorets2	L	L	D	D	W	D	L	L	L	D	W	L	D	D	L	D	D	L	D	D	L	L	L	W	W	L	L	L	L	W
Dinaz	L	L	L	L	L	L	L	L	W	D	L	L	L	L	W	L	L	D	L	D	L	L	L	L	W	D	W	W	L	L
Hirnyk-Sport	L	L	D	W	L	L	L	D	L	L	L	L	D	L	L	L	L	L	W	L	W	L	L	L	L	L	L	D	L	D
Kolos-2	W	W	W	W	L	W	D	W	W	D	W	W	W	D	W	L	W	W	W	W	D	L	D	W	W	W	D	W	W	W
Livyi Bereh-2	L	W	W	D	L	W	W	D	L	D	L	W	L	D	D	W	D	D	L	D	W	W	W	W	D	L	L	D	W	W
Lokomotyv	W	D	L	L	W	W	W	W	W	D	W	W	W	W	W	W	L	W	W	L	W	D	W	W	D	W	W	W	W	W
Oleksandriya2	W	D	W	W	W	D	D	L	D	L	W	W	D	L	W	W	D	W	D	L	L	D	W	W	L	W	L	L	L	L
Penuel	L	L	L	L	D	D	L	L	L	D	L	L	L	W	D	L	L	D	L	D	L	D	L	D	L	L	W	W	L	L
Rebel	W	W	W	L	W	W	L	W	L	D	L	W	W	W	L	D	W	D	L	D	L	W	W	D	L	L	L	W	W	W
Trostianets	W	W	L	W	D	W	W	W	W	D	W	W	D	L	D	L	W	L	D	D	W	W	L	L	L	L	D	L	W	D

Source: pfl.ua
W = Win; D = Draw; L = Loss

=== Group B top goalscorers ===
As of 24 May 2026

Rank	Scorer	Team	Goals (Pen.)
1	Roman Heresh	Livyi Bereh-2 Kyiv	20 (1)
2	Valentyn Ovcharuk	Chaika Petropavlivska Borshchahivka	14 (2)
3	1 player(s)		13
4	1 player(s)		12
5	1 player(s)		11
6	2 player(s)		9
8	4 player(s)		8
12	5 player(s)		7
17	5 player(s)		6
22	5 player(s)		5
27	12 player(s)		4
39	19 player(s)		3
58	35 player(s)		2
93	65 player(s)		1
0	own goal(s)		12

- Own goal(s): Denys Kuryakov (Dinaz Vyshhorod vs Lokomotyv), Artem Makhonin (Chaika Petropavlivska Borshchahivka vs Livyi Bereh-2), Volodymyr Shvets (Livyi Bereh-2 Kyiv vs Lokomotyv), Mykhailo Tymoshenko (Dinaz Vyshhorod vs Hirnyk-Sport), Oleksandr Zaitsev (Dinaz Vyshhorod vs Penuel), Kyrylo Popovych (Oleksandriya-2 vs Hirnyk-Sport), Vadym Konovalov (Lokomotyv Kyiv vs Kolos-2), Denys Kuryakov (Dinaz Vyshhorod vs Oleksandriya-2), Valentyn Tkach (Hirnyk-Sport Horishni Plavni vs Livyi Bereh-2), Illia Lebid (Chornomorets-2 Odesa vs Kolos-2), Stanislav Yarmola (Chornomorets-2 Odesa vs Lokomotyv), Artem Makhonin ({2} Chaika Petropavlivska Borshchahivka vs Rebel)

=== Hat-tricks ===
As of 24 May 2026

Player	For	Against	Result	Date
Maksym Chehlov^{4}	FC Trostianets	Dinaz Vyshhorod	4–1 (A)	16 November 2025
Roman Heresh	Livyi Bereh-2 Kyiv	Rebel Kyiv	3–1 (A)	30 March 2026
Dmytriy Kremchanin	Oleksandriya-2	Kolos-2 Kovalivka	5–2 (A)	12 April 2026
Roman Heresh^{4}	Livyi Bereh-2 Kyiv	Chaika Petropavlivska Borshchahivka	8–0 (H)	24 May 2026

Note: ^{4} – player scored 4 goals

== The league's play-offs ==
=== Title play-off ===
Both groups' winners were expected to play each other for the season's title. Also, both these teams gained a direct promotion to the 2026–27 Ukrainian First League. At the same time, both groups' runners-up were expected to play among themselves for the season's third place and to play against the 13th- and 14th-placed teams in the Persha Liha (First League) for promotion. Later, promotion-relegation play-offs were cancelled.

Both matches, the league's final and third-place match, were played in a single-leg format and on a neutral field. A draw determined the hosting team for each match, which took place on May 15.

Third place final

Team 1	Score	Team 2
FC Kolos-2 Kovalivka	1 – 0	Polissya-2 Zhytomyr

27 May 2026	FC Kolos-2 Kovalivka	1:0	Polissya-2 Zhytomyr	Cherkasy
14:00	Taranukha 36'	Report		Stadium: Cherkasy Arena; Attendance: 30; Referee: Yevhen Makarenko (Cherkasy)

League's final

Team 1	Score	Team 2
FC Lokomotyv Kyiv	1 – 2	Kulykiv-Bilka

31 May 2026	FC Lokomotyv Kyiv	1:2	Kulykiv-Bilka	Khmelnytskyi
14:00	Mordas 55'	Report	Panasyuk 48'; Volkov 87'	Stadium: Sport Complex Podillia; Attendance: 500; Referee: Artem Hordynskyi (Vinnytsia)

=== The league's play-offs results ===
- 1st place – Kulykiv-Bilka, (direct promotion to the 2026–27 Ukrainian First League)
- 2nd place – Lokomotyv Kyiv, (direct promotion to the 2026–27 Ukrainian First League)
- 3rd place – Kolos-2 Kovalivka, (promotion play-offs)
- 4th place – Polissya-2 Zhytomyr, (promotion play-offs)

=== Promotion play-offs ===
The group runners-up were expected to qualify for the inter-tier promotion playoffs.

The relegation–promotion play-off games were expected to be scheduled to take place between the 13th- and 14th-placed teams with the third- and fourth-placed teams of the Second League. The draw was held on May 14, 2026. Following the withdrawal of Rukh Lviv in the Premier League, relegation play-offs were reduced, but later were canceled as Vorskla Poltava failed to receive the Professional Football League license for the next season. The third and fourth-placed teams of the Second League had received direct promotion to the First League.

== Awards ==
=== Round awards ===
Round	Player			Coach		
Round	Player	Club	Reference	Coach	Club	Reference
Round 1	Tymofiy Khussin	FC Trostianets		Oleksandr Maksymov	Polissya-2 Zhytomyr	
Round 2	(Republic of the Congo) Jerry Yoka	Polissya-2 Zhytomyr		Yuriy Bakalov	FC Trostianets	
Round 3	Anton Bohdan	Rebel Kyiv		Dmytro Yefimov	Bukovyna-2 Chernivtsi	
Round 4	Pavlo Zamurenko	FC Trostianets		Yaromyr Loboda	FC Uzhhorod	
Round 5	Nazar Voloshyn	FC Lisne		Maksym Demskyi	Rebel Kyiv	
Round 6	Vladyslav Pohorilyi	Nyva Vinnytsia		Yuriy Bakalov (2)	FC Trostianets	
Round 7	Oleksiy Sakhnenko	Lokomotyv Kyiv		Serhiy Karpenko	Lokomotyv Kyiv	
Round 8	Ivan Zhumiha	Skala 1911 Stryi		Roman Hnativ	Skala 1911 Stryi	
Round 9	Nazar Presich	Atlet Kyiv		Yuriy Yaroshenko	Nyva Vinnytsia	
Round 10	Oleh Nychyporenko	Atlet Kyiv		Serhiy Atlasyuk	Kulykiv-Bilka	
Round 11	Roman Heresh	Livyi Bereh-2 Kyiv		Dmytro Murashenko	Atlet Kyiv	
Round 12	Mykola Vechurko	Chaika Petropavlivska Borshchahivka		Roman Hnativ (2)	Skala 1911 Stryi	
Round 13	Dmytro Antoshyn	FC Uzhhorod		Oleksandr Maksymov (2)	Polissya-2 Zhytomyr	
Round 14	Maksym Kramarchuk	Sambir-Nyva-2		Maksym Demskyi (2)	Rebel Kyiv	
Round 15	Maksym Kramarenko	Chaika Petropavlivska Borshchahivka		Serhiy Karpenko (2)	Lokomotyv Kyiv	
Round 16	Stanislav Vienik	Chornomorets-2 Odesa		Yuriy Yaroshenko (2)	Nyva Vinnytsia	
Round 17	Nazar Voloshyn (2)	FC Lisne		Artem Starhorodskyi	Kolos-2 Kovalivka	
Round 18	Vadym Merdyeyev	Skala 1911 Stryi		Maksym Demskyi (3)	Rebel Kyiv	
Round 19	Maksym Chehlov	FC Trostianets		Volodymyr Sharan	FC Oleksandriya-2	
Round 20	Oleksandr Huskov	Chaika Petropavlivska Borshchahivka		Vadym Khokhlov	Chaika Petropavlivska Borshchahivka	
Round 21	Artur Zahorulko	Nyva Vinnytsia		Serhiy Atlasyuk (2)	FC Kulykiv-Bilka	
winter break
Round 22	Rostyslav Babych	Atlet Kyiv		Artem Starhorodskyi (2)	Kolos-2 Kovalivka	
Round 23	Ivan Romanchuk	Polissya-2 Zhytomyr		Yaromyr Loboda (2)	FC Uzhhorod	
Round 24	Daniyil Yushko	Rebel Kyiv		Yuriy Yaroshenko (3)	Nyva Vinnytsia	
Round 25	Daniyil Volkov	FC Kulykiv-Bilka		Serhiy Atlasyuk (3)	FC Kulykiv-Bilka	
Round 26	Dmytriy Kremchanin	Oleksandriya-2		Yuriy Yaroshenko (4)	Nyva Vinnytsia	
Round 27	Vitaliy Patulyak	FC Kulykiv-Bilka		Oleksandr Semerenko	SC Vilkhivtsi	
Round 28	Artur Petlenko	Nyva Vinnytsia		Viktor Bytsiura	Oleksandriya-2	
Round 29	Yan Karanha	Skala 1911 Stryi		Oleksandr Stepanov	Skala 1911 Stryi	
Round 30	Bohdan Mordas	Lokomotyv Kyiv		Oleksandr Holovko	Dinaz Vyshhorod	
Round 31	Artem Poltavets	Penuel Kryvyi Rih		Ihor Solodenko	Penuel Kryvyi Rih	
Round 32	Dmytro Kovalenko	FC Uzhhorod		Serhiy Atlasyuk (4)	FC Kulykiv-Bilka	
Round 33	Roman Heresh (2)	Livyi Bereh-2 Kyiv		Serhiy Karpenko (3)	Lokomotyv Kyiv	

== Number of teams by region ==
Number	Region	Team(s)
4	Kyiv	Atlet, Livyi Bereh-2, Lokomotyv, and Rebel
4	Kyiv Oblast	Chaika Petropavlivska Borshchahivka, Dinaz Vyshhorod, Kolos-2 Kovalivka, and FC Lisne
3	Lviv Oblast	Kulykiv-Bilka, Sambir-Nyva-2, and Skala 1911 Stryi
2	Odesa Oblast	Chornomorets-2 Odesa and Real Pharma Odesa
2	Zakarpattia Oblast	Uzhhorod and Vilkhivtsi
1	Chernivtsi Oblast	Bukovyna-2 Chernivtsi
1	Kirovohrad Oblast	Oleksandriya-2
1	Poltava Oblast	Hirnyk-Sport Horishni Plavni
1	Sumy Oblast	Trostianets
1	Vinnytsia Oblast	Nyva Vinnytsia
1	Zhytomyr Oblast	Polissya-2 Zhytomyr

== See also ==
- 2025–26 Ukrainian Cup
- 2025–26 Ukrainian Premier League
- 2025–26 Ukrainian First League
- 2025–26 Ukrainian Amateur Cup
- 2025–26 Ukrainian Football Amateur League
- 2025–26 Ukrainian Premier League Under-19
- 2025–26 Ukrainian Women's Top League
- List of Ukrainian football transfers summer 2026
- List of Ukrainian football transfers winter 2025–26
