= Nazar Voloshyn (footballer, born 2000) =

Ukrainian footballer

Personal information
- Full name: Nazar Ruslanovych Voloshyn
- Date of birth: 4 September 2000 (age 26)
- Place of birth: Borzna, Ukraine
- Height: 1.88 m (6 ft 2 in)
- Position: Attacking midfielder

Team information
- Current team: Livyi Bereh Kyiv
- Number: 21

Youth career
- 2017–2018: Yunist Chernihiv
- 2018–2019: Polissya Dobryanka
- 2019–2020: Avanhard Koryukivka
- 2020–2021: Ahrodim Bakhmach

Senior career*
Years	Team	Apps	(Gls)
2021–2024	Kudrivka	22	(6)
2024–2025	Lisne	42	(28)
2025–	Livyi Bereh Kyiv	16	(3)
- * Club domestic league appearances and goals as of 6 November 2026

Nazar Ruslanovych Voloshyn (Ukrainian: Назар Русланович Волошин; born 4 September 2000) is a Ukrainian professional footballer who plays as an attacking midfielder for Livyi Bereh Kyiv.

== Career ==
=== Early career ===
Voloshyn started his football career at Yunist Chernihiv in 2017 before moving to Polissya Dobryanka and Avanhard Koryukivka.

=== Kudrivka ===
On 2 August 2025, Voloshyn made his debut in the Ukrainian Cup against Kremin Kremenchuk at the Yunist Stadium in Chernihiv. Following the promotion of the club, on 6 August 2023, he made his debut in the Ukrainian Second League against Skala 1911 Stryi. On 11 August, he scored his first goal with the new club against Vast Mykolaiv at the Kudrivka Arena in Kudrivka.

=== Lisne ===
In 2024, he moved to Lisne in the Ukrainian Amateur Championship. On 27 July 2025, he scored two goals against Atlet Kyiv and the following day, he was included in the Best XI of Round 1 of the 2025–26 Ukrainian Second League.

On 29 August, he scored three goals against Real Pharma Odesa at the Tsentralnyi Stadion in Makariv. Voloshyn played FC Lisne's matches in the Ukrainian Cup, helping the club to qualify for the round of 16 for the first time.

Despite the club's difficulties and the resignation of coach Oleksandr Ryabokon, Voloshyn kept performing well. On 8 November 2025, he scored three goal against Skala 1911 Stryi. Due to his performance, he was included in the Best XI of Round 17 of the 2025–26 Ukrainian Second League. Voloshyn adapted quickly to life in Lisne, where he scored 15 goals and he become the top scorer of the competition.

=== FC Livyi Bereh Kyiv ===
In December 2025 he moved to Livyi Bereh Kyiv in Ukrainian First League. On 3 April 2026 he scored two goals against Feniks-Mariupol at the Arena Livyi Bereh.

== Career statistics ==
As of match played 6 November 2026

Appearances and goals by club, season and competition
Club	Season	League			Cup		Europe		Other		Total	
Club	Season	Division	Apps	Goals	Apps	Goals	Apps	Goals	Apps	Goals	Apps	Goals
Kudrivka	2023–24	Ukrainian Second League	22	6	1	0	0	0	0	0	23	6
Lisne	2024–25	Ukrainian Amateur League	30	15	0	0	0	0	0	0	30	15
Lisne	2025–26	Ukrainian Second League	12	13	3	0	0	0	0	0	15	13
Livyi Bereh Kyiv	2025–26	Ukrainian First League	12	3	0	0	0	0	2	0	14	3
Livyi Bereh Kyiv	2026–27	Ukrainian Premier League	4	0	3	0	0	0	0	0	7	0
Career total			80	38	7	0	0	0	2	0	89	38

== Honours ==
Kudrivka

- Chernihiv Oblast Football Championship: 2022
- Chernihiv Oblast Football Cup: 2021, 2022,
- Chernihiv Oblast Super Cupː 2021, 2022 2023
- Kyiv Oblast Football Cup: 2021

Individual

- Top scorer of Chernihiv Oblast Super Cup: 2023
- Top scorer of Ukrainian Amateur League: (2021–22, canceled competition), 2024–25
