= Vikentiy Voloshyn =

Ukrainian footballer

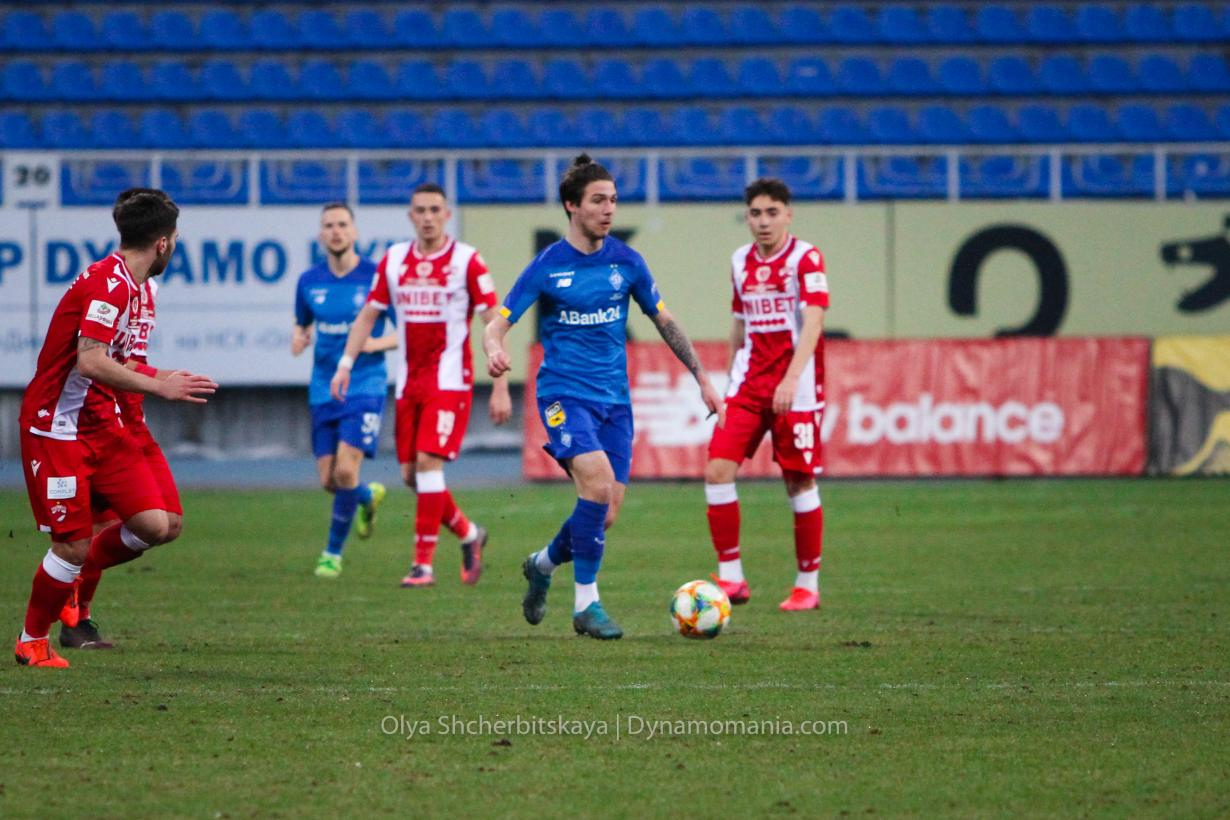

Personal information
- Full name: Vikentiy Valeriyovych Voloshyn
- Date of birth: 17 April 2001 (age 25)
- Place of birth: Kyiv, Ukraine
- Height: 1.79 m (5 ft 10 in)
- Position: Attacking midfielder

Team information
- Current team: Livyi Bereh Kyiv
- Number: 15

Youth career
- 2013–2021: Dynamo Kyiv

Senior career*
Years	Team	Apps	(Gls)
2021–	Dynamo Kyiv	0	(0)
2021–2022	→ Desna Chernihiv (loan)	11	(2)
2022–2023	→ Oleksandriya (loan)	18	(0)
2023–2024	→ Zorya Luhansk (loan)	16	(1)
2025	Lisne	9	(1)
2025–	Livyi Bereh Kyiv	22	(7)

International career^{‡}
2017–2018	Ukraine U17	14	(5)
2018	Ukraine U18	2	(0)
2018–2019	Ukraine U19	4	(2)
- * Club domestic league appearances and goals as of 21 November 2026 ‡ National team caps and goals as of 5 September 2023

Vikentiy Valeriyovych Voloshyn (Ukrainian: Вікентій Валерійович Волошин; born 17 April 2001) is a Ukrainian professional footballer who plays as an attacking midfielder for Livyi Bereh Kyiv.

== Club career ==
=== Dynamo Kyiv ===
Vikentiy Voloshyn is a youth product of Dynamo Kyiv, winning the Ukrainian Under-19 League in 2019 and in 2020. In the summer 2022 he returned to the club and played in the Global Tour for Peace. On 13 May 2022, he scored against Flora.

==== Loan to Desna Chernihiv ====
In July 2021 he moved on loan to Desna Chernihiv. On 25 July he made his league debut against Chornomorets Odesa, coming on as a substitute in the 81st minute. On 12 September he scored his first goal against Vorskla Poltava. On 21 September he scored against Metalist Kharkiv in the 2021-22 Ukrainian Cup.

==== Loan to Oleksandriya ====
In July 2022 he moved on loan to Oleksandriya.

==== Loan to Zorya Luhansk ====
In July 2023 he was loaned to Zorya Luhansk. On 23 July 2023, he made his debut with his new club against Rukh Lviv at the Arena Lviv. On 21 September he scored against FSC Mariupol in the 2023-24 Ukrainian Cup. On 31 August 2023 he made his debut in UEFA Europa League against Slavia Prague at the Arena Lublin in Poland.

=== FC Lisne ===
In summer 2025 after an interest from Inhulets Petrove, he moved to Lisne in Ukrainian Second League. On 14 September 2025, he made his debut in Ukrainian Second League with his new club against Vilkhivtsi, replacing Dmytro Hryshchenko. On 23 September 2025, he scored in Ukrainian Cup against Olympia Savyntsi.

=== Livyi Bereh Kyiv ===
In December 2025 he signed for Livyi Bereh Kyiv. On 13 March 2026 he scored two goals against Metalist Kharkiv at the Arena Livyi Bereh. Due to this performance, he was included in the Best XI of Round 23 of the 2025–26 Ukrainian First League. On 5 June 2026, he scored against Oleksandriya for the Relegation play-offs at the CSC Nika Stadium in Oleksandriia.

== International career ==
In 2017 he was called up by the Ukraine under-17 team. On 28 January 2018, he scored against Moldova under-17 team for the Development Cup in Minsk in Belarus. On 27 September 2021, he was called up by the Ukraine national under-21 football team.

== Career statistics ==
=== Club ===
As of match played 21 November 2026

Appearances and goals by club, season and competition
Club	Season	League			Cup		Europe		Other		Total	
Club	Season	Division	Apps	Goals	Apps	Goals	Apps	Goals	Apps	Goals	Apps	Goals
Dynamo Kyiv	2021–22	Ukrainian Premier League	0	0	0	0	0	0	0	0	0	0
Dynamo Kyiv	2024–25	Ukrainian Premier League	0	0	0	0	0	0	0	0	0	0
Desna Chernihiv (loan)	2021–22	Ukrainian Premier League	11	2	1	1	0	0	0	0	12	3
Oleksandriya (loan)	2022–23	Ukrainian Premier League	18	0	0	0	0	0	0	0	18	0
Zorya Luhansk (loan)	2023–24	Ukrainian Premier League	13	1	1	1	1 (Note: one appearance in 2023–24 UEFA Europa League qualifying)	0	0	0	15	2
Zorya Luhansk (loan)	2024–25	Ukrainian Premier League	3	0	1	0	0	0	0	0	4	0
Lisne	2025–26	Ukrainian Second League	9	1	1	1	0	0	0	0	10	2
Livyi Bereh Kyiv	2025–26	Ukrainian First League	12	5	0	0	0	0	2	1	14	6
Livyi Bereh Kyiv	2026–27	Ukrainian Premier League	10	2	2	1	0	0	0	0	12	3
Career total			76	11	6	4	1	0	2	1	85	16

== Honours ==
Dynamo Kyiv

- Ukrainian Premier League: 2024–25
- Ukrainian Cup: Runner-Up 2024–25

FC Dynamo Kyiv U-19

- Ukrainian Premier League Reserves: (2) 2017–18, 2018–19

=== Individual ===
- SportArena Player of the Round: 2025-26 (Round 23)
