= Edvard Kobak =

Ukrainian footballer

Personal information
- Full name: Edvard Fedorovych Kobak
- Date of birth: 22 April 2002 (age 24)
- Place of birth: Mukachevo, Ukraine
- Height: 1.75 m (5 ft 9 in)
- Position: Right winger

Team information
- Current team: Vilkhivtsi
- Number: 22

Youth career
- 2014–2016: DVUFK Dnipropetrovsk
- 2016–2018: Dnipro
- 2018–2021: Shakhtar Donetsk

Senior career*
Years	Team	Apps	(Gls)
2021–2023	Shakhtar Donetsk	0	(0)
2021–2022	→ Mynai (loan)	10	(0)
2022	→ Dubrava (loan)	5	(0)
2023	Karpaty Krosno	17	(5)
2023–2024	Metalist Kharkiv	2	(0)
2024	Lisne	5	(0)
2024	Lokomotyv Kyiv	12	(1)
2025	Kulykiv-Bilka	4	(0)
2025	Lisne	10	(1)
2026–	Vilkhivtsi	20	(4)

International career^{‡}
2017	Ukraine U16	4	(0)
2018–2019	Ukraine U17	5	(2)
- * Club domestic league appearances and goals as of 18 October 2026 ‡ National team caps and goals as of 13 July 2023

Edvard Fedorovych Kobak (Ukrainian: Едвард Федорович Кобак; born 22 April 2002) is a Ukrainian professional footballer who plays as a right winger for Vilkhivtsi.

== Playing career ==
=== Karpaty Krosno ===
In March 2022 after the 2022 Russian invasion of Ukraine, he moved to Karpaty Krosno in Poland.

=== Metalist Kharkiv ===
After a trial with Sunderland Under-21, in September 2023 he signed for Metalist Kharkiv in Ukrainian First League.

=== Lisne ===
In January 2024 he signed for Lisne a new club in Kiev in Ukrainian Amateur Championship.

=== Lokomotyv Kyiv & Kulykiv-Bilka ===
In summer 2024 he moved to Lokomotyv Kyiv and in December 2024 he moved to Kulykiv-Bilka in Ukrainian Second League.

=== Lisne ===
In summer 2025 he moved back to Lisne just promoted in Ukrainian Second League On 26 August 2025 he scored against Atlet Kyiv at the Tsentralnyi Stadion in Makariv. On 25 August 2025 he scored two goals in Ukrainian Cup against Chaika in Sofiivska Borshchahivka.

=== SC Vilkhivtsi ===
In February 2026, he signed for Vilkhivtsi.

== International career ==
On 10 October 2018, he scored his first goal for the Ukraine under-17 side against Iceland at the MGM Farm Arena in Kakanj. On 13 October 2018 he scored against Gibraltar.
