= FC Rebel Kyiv =

Rebel Kyiv
- Full name: Football Club Rebel Kyiv
- Founded: 2024
- Ground: Shkilnyi, Mykhailivka-Rubezhivka; Tsentralnyi Stadion, Makariv
- Capacity: 200; 3,100
- Chairman: Dmytro Kyrylenko
- Manager: Maksym Demskyi
- League: Ukrainian Second League
- 2024–25: Ukrainian Amateur League, Group 2, 4th of 10 (promoted)

The FC Rebel Kyiv (Ukrainian: Футбольний клуб «ФК Ребел Київ») is a Ukrainian football club, located in Kyiv.

The club was established on the junior under-19 team of the Nika sports school in Kyiv. As Nika Kyiv, it competed in the Kyiv city competitions as well as the Ukrainian First League U-19 Championship. In 2024, it was transformed into a football club that set out to get admitted to professional football. It adopted the name of Rebel and was admitted to the AAFU competitions (national amateur level). Along with it, the club applied to the Professional Football League and received approval in the summer of 2025.

== Players ==
=== Current squad ===
As of 1 April 2026

Note: Flags indicate national team as defined under FIFA eligibility rules; some limited exceptions apply. Players may hold more than one non-FIFA nationality.

No.	Pos.	Nation	Player
1	GK	UKR	Bogdan Bytsenko
3	DF	UKR	Yevgeniy Debelko
6	DF	UKR	Semen Klyuchyk
7	MF	UKR	Denys Vlasenko
8	MF	UKR	Danylo Panov
9	FW	UKR	Yaroslav Bazaev
10	MF	UKR	Mykola Neskey
14	MF	UKR	Hlib Harbar
15	FW	UKR	Mykhaylo Slipchuk
16	FW	UKR	Bohdan Andrukhiv
17	MF	UKR	Vladyslav Zorenko
20	DF	UKR	Yevgeniy Mazur
21	DF	UKR	Vyacheslav Stavnychyi

No.	Pos.	Nation	Player
22	FW	UKR	Daniil Yushko (on loan from Obolon Kyiv)
23	FW	UKR	Danylo Kolesnyk
31	GK	UKR	Viktor Ulihanets
35	DF	UKR	Dmytro Maksymenko
70	MF	UKR	Yuriy Hezelo
77	DF	UKR	Vladyslav Hromskyi
89	MF	UKR	Oleksandr Volkov
91	FW	UKR	Anton Bogdan
94	GK	UKR	Maksym Babiychuk
95	FW	UKR	Parviz Rustamov
97	DF	UKR	Yehor Kapustyan
98	MF	UKR	Denys Bredelyov
99	FW	UKR	Vladyslav Klymenko

=== Out on loan ===
Note: Flags indicate national team as defined under FIFA eligibility rules; some limited exceptions apply. Players may hold more than one non-FIFA nationality.

No. / Pos. / Nation / Player	No. / Pos. / Nation / Player

=== Other players under contract ===
Note: Flags indicate national team as defined under FIFA eligibility rules; some limited exceptions apply. Players may hold more than one non-FIFA nationality.

No. / Pos. / Nation / Player	No. / Pos. / Nation / Player

== League and cup history ==
Season	Div.	Pos.	Pl.	W	D	L	GS	GA	P	Domestic Cup	Europe		Notes
2024–25	4th (Amateur League:Group 2)	4_{/10}	18	11	2	5	32	15	35	-	-	-	Qualification to second stage.Lisne 3:1 2:1 (5-2), Dnister Zalishchyky 0:1 1:0 (1-1)(a.e.t.) (2-4)(p).Admission to Ukrainian Second League
2025–26	3th (Second League:Group B)	4_{/11}	30	15	5	10	34	27	50	Round of 64 (1/32)	-	-	-
2026–27	3th (Second League:Group B)	5_{/9}	11	4	3	4	18	16	15	Round of 64 (1/32)	-	-	TBD
