= Semen Klyuchyk =

Ukrainian footballer

Personal information
- Full name: Semen Leonidovych Klyuchyk
- Date of birth: 23 December 1997 (age 28)
- Place of birth: Zaporizhzhia, Ukraine
- Height: 1.92 m (6 ft 4 in)
- Position: Defender

Team information
- Current team: Rebel Kyiv
- Number: 6

Youth career
- 2010–2014: Metalurh Zaporizhzhia

Senior career*
| Years | Team | Apps | (Gls) |
| 2014–2015 | Metalurh Zaporizhzhia | 2 | (0) |
| 2016 | Chornomorets Odesa | 0 | (0) |
| 2017–2018 | Vorskla Poltava | 0 | (0) |
| 2019–2021 | Denhoff Denykhivka | 6 | (0) |
| 2021–2022 | AFSC Kyiv | 18 | (1) |
| 2022–2023 | Orlęta Radzyń Podlaski | 0 | (0) |
| 2023 | Dinaz Vyshhorod | 0 | (0) |
| 2023 | Nika Kyiv | 0 | (0) |
| 2023– | Rebel Kyiv | 37 | (1) |
- * Club domestic league appearances and goals as of 6 June 2026

Semen Leonidovych Klyuchyk (Ukrainian: Семен Леонідович Ключик; born 23 December 1997) is a Ukrainian professional footballer who plays as a defender for Rebel Kyiv.

== Career ==
Klyuchyk is a product of FC Metalurh Zaporizhzhia youth team system. His first trainer was Dmytro Vysotskyi.

He made his debut for Metalurh Zaporizhzhia in the Ukrainian Premier League in a match against FC Volyn Lutsk on 29 November 2015.

In September 2022, Klyuchyk signed a contract with Polish III liga side Orlęta Radzyń Podlaski, however as of April 2023, he has not yet been able to leave Ukraine in order to join the team.
