= Maksym Babiychuk =

Ukrainian footballer (born 1994)

Personal information
- Full name: Maksym Mykolayovych Babiychuk
- Date of birth: 28 April 1994 (age 32)
- Place of birth: Zaporizhzhia, Ukraine
- Height: 1.93 m (6 ft 4 in)
- Position: Goalkeeper

Team information
- Current team: Rebel Kyiv
- Number: 94

Youth career
- 2007–2011: Metalurh Zaporizhzhia
- 2008–2009: → Kosmos Zaporizhzhia

Senior career*
Years	Team	Apps	(Gls)
2011–2015	Metalurh Zaporizhzhia	4	(0)
2012	→ Metalurh-2 Zaporizhzhia	6	(0)
2016	Bukovyna Chernivtsi	0	(0)
2016–2018	Nyva-V Vinnytsia	22	(0)
2018–2021	Veres Rivne	38	(0)
2022	Kramatorsk	0	(0)
2023–2024	Druzhba Myrivka	1	(0)
2024–	Rebel Kyiv	31	(0)
- * Club domestic league appearances and goals as of 6 June 2026

Maksym Mykolayovych Babiychuk (Ukrainian: Максим Миколайович Бабійчук; born 28 April 1994) is a Ukrainian professional footballer who plays as a goalkeeper for Rebel Kyiv.

== Career ==
Babiychuk is a product of the Metalurh Zaporizhzhia Youth Sportive School System. His first trainer was Mykola Pozdobudko.

He made his debut for Metalurh Zaporizhzhia in the Ukrainian Premier League in a match against FC Karpaty Lviv on 31 October 2015.

He was called up to the Ukraine national under-20 football team in October 2014, but not spent any match for this representation.

== Honours ==
Druzhba Myrivka

- Ukrainian Second League: 2023–24
