= Stanislav Tyshchenko =

Ukrainian-Russian footballer and manager

Personal information
- Full name: Stanislav Mykolayovych Tyshchenko
- Date of birth: 26 December 1974 (age 51)
- Place of birth: Donetsk, Ukrainian SSR
- Height: 1.85 m (6 ft 1 in)
- Position: Goalkeeper

Youth career
- 1992–1995: Shakhtar Donetsk

Senior career*
Years	Team	Apps	(Gls)
1992–1993	Metalurh Kostiantynivka	9	(0)
1993–1994	Shakhtar-2 Donetsk	5	(0)
1995	Volyn Lutsk	1	(0)
1996	Metalurh Donetsk	3	(0)
1996	Metalurh Komsomolske	6	(0)
1997	Shakhtar Stakhanov	28	(0)
1998	Molodechno	6	(0)
1999–2000	Dostyk	22	(0)
2000–2001	Mangystau	28	(0)
2002	Vinnytsia	8	(0)
2003	Elektrometalurh-NZF Nikopol	2	(0)
2004	Spartak Nalchik	4	(0)
2005	Zenit Chelyabinsk	33	(0)
2006	Mashuk-KMV Pyatigorsk	21	(0)
2007	Avangard Kursk	19	(0)
2008	Volgar Astrakhan	33	(0)
2009–2010	Metallurg-Yenisey Krasnoyarsk	49	(0)
2011–2012	Dynamo Stavropol	10	(0)
Total		287	(0)

Managerial career
- 2012–2018: Olimpik Donetsk (assistant)
- 2019–2020: Karpaty Lviv (GK coach)
- 2021: Olimpik Donetsk (Goalkeeping Coach)
- 2023: Lokomotyv Kyiv (Goalkeeping Coach)
- 2025–: FC Lisne (Goalkeeping Coach)
- * Club domestic league appearances and goals as of 27 October 2025

Stanislav Tyshchenko (Ukrainian: Станіслав Миколайович Тищенко; born 26 December 1974) is a Ukrainian professional football manager and former player; he also holds Russian citizenship.
