= Pavlo Kravtsov =

Ukrainian footballer

Personal information
- Full name: Pavlo Andriyovych Kravtsov
- Date of birth: 19 January 2000 (age 26)
- Place of birth: Ukraine
- Height: 1.94 m (6 ft 4 in)
- Position: Goalkeeper

Youth career
- 2013–2015: Shakhtar Donetsk
- 2015–2017: Olimpiya-Azovstal Mariupol

Senior career*
Years	Team	Apps	(Gls)
2017–2021	FC Mariupol	1	(0)
2021–2025	FSC Mariupol	28	(0)
2025	Lisne	6	(0)
- * Club domestic league appearances and goals as of 8 November 2025

Pavlo Andriyovych Kravtsov (Ukrainian: Павло Андрійович Кравцов; born 19 January 2000) is a Ukrainian professional footballer who plays as a goalkeeper.

== Career ==
=== Early career ===
Kravtsov is a product of the Shakhtar Donetsk and Mariupol academies.

=== FC Mariupol ===
From August 2017 he played for Mariupol in the Ukrainian Premier League Reserves and Under 19 during four seasons. In July 2019 he was promoted to the main squad to play in the Ukrainian Premier League. Kravtsov made his debut in the Ukrainian Premier League for Mariupol as a start squad player on 9 May 2021, playing in a winning home match against Desna Chernihiv.

=== FSC Mariupol ===
In 2021, he moved to Yarud, which later became FSC Mariupol, becoming the club's first-choice goalkeeper in the Ukrainian Second League.

=== FC Lisne ===
In March 2025 he made was on trial at Mynai, failed to impress the coaching staff and left the team. In summer 2025 he signed for Lisne just admitted in Ukrainian Second League.
