= Ihor Soldat =

Ukrainian footballer

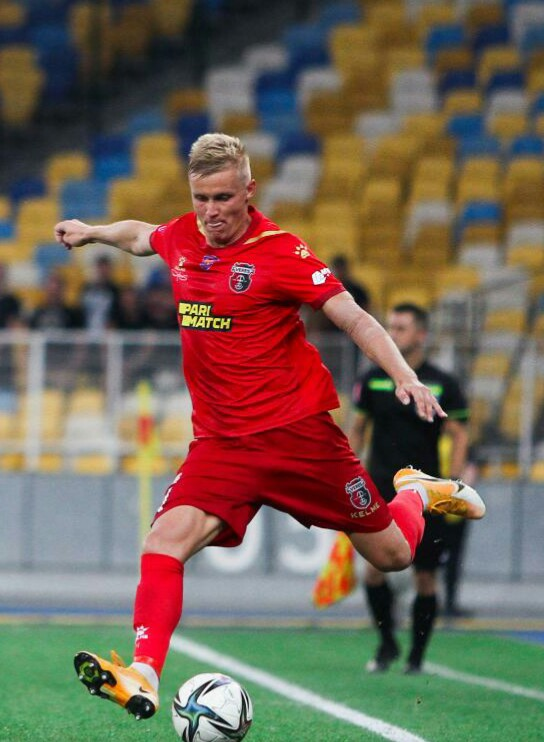

Personal information
- Full name: Ihor Volodymyrovych Soldat
- Date of birth: 10 March 1991 (age 35)
- Place of birth: Kyiv, Soviet Union (now Ukraine)
- Height: 1.81 m (5 ft 11 in)
- Position: Defender

Team information
- Current team: Bucha

Youth career
- 2004–2005: Vidradnyi Kyiv
- 2005–2006: Youth Sportive School #15 Kyiv
- 2007–2008: KSDYSOR Kyiv

Senior career*
Years	Team	Apps	(Gls)
2009–2014	Stal Alchevsk	59	(2)
2009–2011	→ Stal-2 Alchevsk	7	(0)
2014	Metalurh Donetsk	0	(0)
2014–2016	Hirnyk Kryvyi Rih	45	(1)
2016–2017	Desna Chernihiv	7	(0)
2017–2019	Inhulets Petrove	42	(1)
2019–2022	Veres Rivne	65	(6)
2022–2023	LNZ Cherkasy	20	(1)
2023	Mynai	13	(0)
2024–2025	Bukovyna Chernivtsi	22	(0)
2025	Lisne	8	(1)
2026	Bucha	0	(0)
2026	Druzhba-Kozaky	0	(0)
2026–	Bucha	0	(0)
- * Club domestic league appearances and goals as of 5 September 2026

Ihor Volodymyrovych Soldat (Ukrainian: Ігор Володимирович Солдат; born 10 March 1991) is a Ukrainian professional footballer who plays as a defender for Bucha.

== Career ==
Soldat is product of different Kyivan youth systems. He made his professional debut on 30 September 2011, coming on as a second-half substitute for Stal Alchevsk in the Ukrainian First League. In summer 2025 he signed for Lisne in Ukrainian Second League.

== Honours ==
Veres Rivne

- Ukrainian First League: 2020-21

Inhulets Petrove

- Ukrainian Cup runner-up: 2018–19
