= Yaroslav Dobrokhotov =

Ukrainian footballer

Personal information
- Full name: Yaroslav Mykhaylovych Dobrokhotov
- Date of birth: 1 November 2000 (age 26)
- Place of birth: Stakhanov, Ukraine
- Height: 1.75 m (5 ft 9 in)
- Position: Central midfielder

Team information
- Current team: Viktoriya Sumy
- Number: 8

Youth career
- 2013–2017: Shakhtar Donetsk

Senior career*
| Years | Team | Apps | (Gls) |
| 2017–2018 | Krystal Kherson (amateurs) | 15 | (2) |
| 2018–2021 | Mariupol | 3 | (0) |
| 2021–2023 | Mariupol | 27 | (5) |
| 2023–2024 | Podillya Khmelnytskyi | 12 | (2) |
| 2024–2025 | Lokomotyv Kyiv | 1 | (0) |
| 2025 | Lisne | 11 | (1) |
| 2026– | Viktoriya Sumy | 25 | (1) |
- * Club domestic league appearances and goals as of 18 October 2026

Yaroslav Mykhaylovych Dobrokhotov (Ukrainian: Ярослав Михайлович Доброхотов; born 1 November 2000) is a Ukrainian professional footballer who plays as a central midfielder for Viktoriya Sumy in the Ukrainian Second League.

== Career ==
Dobrokhotov is a product mainly of Shakhtar Donetsk youth sportive school system.

He made his début for FC Mariupol in the Ukrainian Premier League as a substituted player in a drawing away match against FC Rukh Lviv on 20 November 2020.

On 18 March 2026, he signed for Viktoriya Sumy.
