= Illya Karavashchenko =

Ukrainian footballer

Personal information
- Full name: Illya Vyacheslavovych Karavashchenko
- Date of birth: 25 June 2001 (age 25)
- Place of birth: Lutuhyne, Ukraine
- Height: 1.92 m (6 ft 4 in)
- Position: Goalkeeper

Team information
- Current team: Zorya Luhansk
- Number: 23

Youth career
- 2012–2014: Zorya Luhansk
- 2014: KODYuSSh Shchaslyve
- 2015–2020: Shakhtar Donetsk
- 2020: Desna-2 Chernihiv

Senior career*
Years	Team	Apps	(Gls)
2020–2021	Desna Chernihiv	0	(0)
2021–2022	VPK-Ahro	0	(0)
2022–2025	FSC Mariupol	29	(0)
2025	Livyi Bereh Kyiv	0	(0)
2025–2026	Kudrivka	4	(0)
2025	→ Lisne (loan)	7	(0)
2026–	Zorya Luhansk	1	(0)
- * Club domestic league appearances and goals as of 31 August 2026

Illya Vyacheslavovych Karavashchenko (Ukrainian: Ілля Вячеславович Караващенко; born 25 June 2001) is a Ukrainian professional footballer who plays as a goalkeeper for Zorya Luhansk.

== Career ==
=== Early career ===
Karavashchenko began playing football in Zorya Luhansk academy. After a short pause, in 2014 he moved to Kyiv to his relatives where he was training in nearby suburbs with KODYuSSh Shchaslyve. In 2015 Karavashchenko finally made it to the academy of the main eastern Ukraine football club Shakhtar Donetsk which just relocated to Shchaslyve and with which he stayed almost until 2020. In 2018 he was on the Shakhtar's roster for 2018–19 UEFA Youth Champions League as a reserve goalkeeper spending all his time on the bench.

In February 2020 he was transferred out to the UPL team of Desna Chernihiv, but was listed as a third goalie and did not get much of playtime partially due to injury. After a season he was loaned to the second tier VPK-Ahro Shevchenkivka playing in central Ukrainian city of Dnipro. In VPK-Ahro Karavashchenko was struggling to make to a senior squad as well. On 5 October 2021 VPK-Ahro released the player back to Desna.

=== FSC Mariupol ===
Due to the full-scale Russian invasion of Ukraine in 2022, he transferred to FSC Mariupol which has relocated to Boryspil and was admitted to the second tier (Persha Liha).

In his first year for Mariupol's team Karavashchenko was a reserve goalkeeper mostly spending his time on the bench in 10 out of the 22 season's matches. He finally made his debut at professional level on 26 May 2023 in away match against Hirnyk-Sport Horishni Plavni which Mariupol lost 0:1. The next 2023–24 season became a real breakthrough for Karavashchenko who started out in all 18 matches of the first half for Mariupol and recorded 8 clean sheets. Mariupol, which was struggling in previous year, qualified for the Championship group with only 3 matches lost. Mariupol also improved in national cup competitions eliminating Kolos Kovalivka in penalty shootout on efforts of Karavashchenko and reaching round of 16 for the first time.

=== Livyi Bereh Kyiv ===
In January 2025, he signed for Livyi Bereh Kyiv in Ukrainian Premier League.

=== Kudrivka ===
On 30 July 2025 he signed a contract with Kudrivka just promoted to Ukrainian Premier League.

==== Loan to Lisne ====
On 14 August 2025 he was loaned to Lisne in Ukrainian Second League. On 3 September 2025, he made his debut in Ukrainian Second League against Skala Stryi at the Sokil Stadium.

=== Zorya Luhansk ===
On 28 July 2026 he moved to Zorya Luhansk.

== Career statistics ==
=== Club ===
As of match played 30 September 2026

Appearances and goals by club, season and competition
Club	Season	League			Cup		Europe		Other		Total	
Club	Season	Division	Apps	Goals	Apps	Goals	Apps	Goals	Apps	Goals	Apps	Goals
Desna Chernihiv	2020–21	Ukrainian Premier League	0	0	0	0	0	0	0	0	0	0
VPK-Ahro (Loan)	2021–22	Ukrainian First League	0	0	0	0	0	0	0	0	0	0
Desna Chernihiv	2021–22	Ukrainian Premier League	0	0	0	0	0	0	0	0	0	0
FSC Mariupol	2022–23	Ukrainian First League	1	0	0	0	0	0	0	0	1	0
FSC Mariupol	2023–24	Ukrainian First League	28	0	1	0	0	0	0	0	29	0
Livyi Bereh Kyiv	2024–25	Ukrainian Premier League	0	0	0	0	0	0	0	0	0	0
Lisne (loan)	2025–26	Ukrainian Second League	7	0	2	0	0	0	0	0	9	0
Kudrivka	2025–26	Ukrainian Premier League	4	0	0	0	0	0	0	0	4	0
Kudrivka	Total		4	0	0	0	0	0	0	0	4	0
Zorya Luhansk	2026–27	Ukrainian Premier League	1	0	2	0	0	0	0	0	3	0
Zorya Luhansk	Total		1	0	2	0	0	0	0	0	3	0
Career total			41	0	5	0	0	0	0	0	46	0
