= Serhiy Rybalka =

Ukrainian footballer (born 1990)

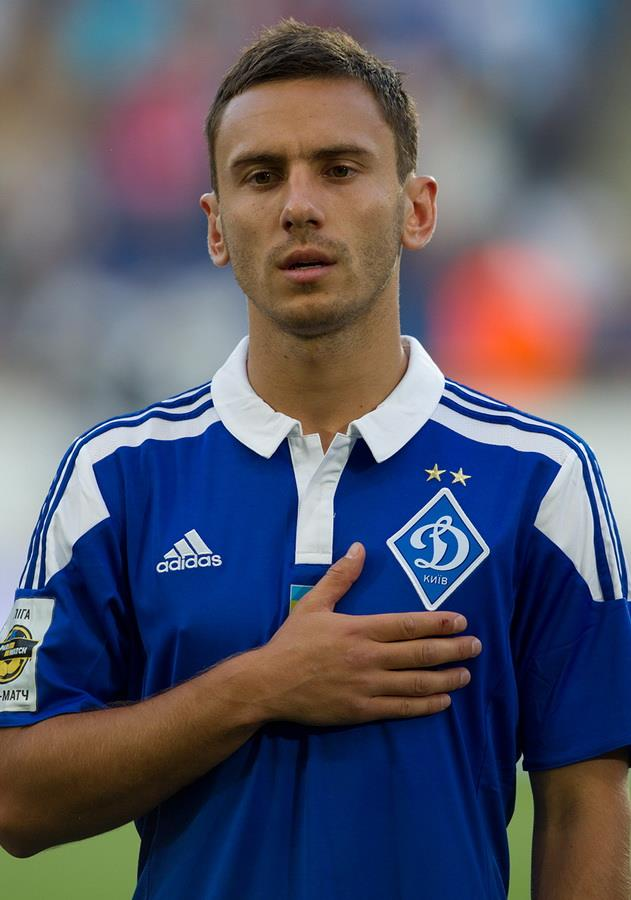

Personal information
- Full name: Serhiy Oleksandrovych Rybalka
- Date of birth: 1 April 1990 (age 36)
- Place of birth: Yamne, Sumy Oblast, Soviet Union (now Ukraine)
- Height: 1.76 m (5 ft 9 in)
- Position: Midfielder

Youth career
- 2003–2006: Arsenal Kharkiv

Senior career*
Years	Team	Apps	(Gls)
2006–2008	Arsenal Kharkiv	48	(20)
2008–2010	Dynamo-2 Kyiv	75	(13)
2010–2018	Dynamo Kyiv	67	(2)
2013–2014	→ Slovan Liberec (loan)	37	(8)
2017–2018	→ Sivasspor (loan)	21	(1)
2018–2021	Sivasspor	31	(4)
2021–2023	Oleksandriya	40	(4)
2023–2024	LNZ Cherkasy	17	(1)
2024–2025	Lisne	13	(3)

International career^{‡}
2008–2009	Ukraine U18	5	(0)
2008–2009	Ukraine U19	11	(1)
2010	Ukraine U20	2	(0)
2010–2012	Ukraine U21	10	(6)
2015–2016	Ukraine	9	(0)

Managerial career
- 2026–: Rukh Lviv (assistant)
Medal record
Men's football
Representing Ukraine
UEFA European Under-19 Championship
Winner	2009 Ukraine
- * Club domestic league appearances and goals as of 16 November 2025 ‡ National team caps and goals as of 19 May 2019

Serhiy Oleksandrovych Rybalka (Ukrainian: Сергій Олександрович Рибалка; born 1 April 1990) is a former Ukrainian professional footballer.

== Club career ==
=== Arsenal Kharkiv ===
Born in Yamne, Sumy Oblast, Ukrainian SSR, Rybalka was the top scorer in Arsenal Kharkiv's history, by scoring 20 goals and surpassing Yuriy Martiniuk who had 19 goals. He caught the interest from many clubs, including from the Israeli Premier League club Maccabi Haifa who saw him as a very talented and perspective youth player. However, he chose to go to FC Dynamo Kyiv.

=== Dynamo Kyiv ===
Rybalka made his senior team debut on 21 September 2011 in the Ukrainian Cup 3–2 victory against Kremin Kremenchuk. He opened the score in the 14th minute, hitting the free kick into the upper corner. A month later, on 23 October 2011, he made his Ukrainian Premier League debut, coming on at half time in a 6-1 thrashing of Zorya Luhansk.

After the debut, Rybalka struggled to establish himself in the squad. In order to help his development, it was decided to loan him to Czech club Slovan Liberec until the end of the 2012–2013 season. Rybalka immediately became one of the key players for Slovan, and in the summer of 2013 his loan was extended for one more season. Rybalka again featured prominently in the side, helping Slovan reach the Round of 32 in the 2013–14 UEFA Europa League.

After a successful loan spell, Rybalka returned to Dynamo for the 2014–15 season. New team manager Serhii Rebrov put a lot more trust in him than did Dynamo's previous managers Yuri Syomin and Oleh Blokhin, by making him a permanent fixture in midfield. On 17 May 2015, in a 1-0 Ukrainian Premier League victory against Dnipro, Rybalka assisted on what became the title-clinching goal by Domagoj Vida. On 16 September 2015, Rybalka made his UEFA Champions League debut in a 2–2 draw against Portuguese team FC Porto in the group stage, he assisted Dynamo's second goal which was scored by Vitaliy Buyalskyi on the 89th minute which gave Dynamo a draw.

=== Sivasspor ===
On 8 September 2017, Rybalka was loaned to Sivasspor, who had just returned to the Turkish Super League after a one-year absence. After a season on loan, Sivasspor bought Rybalka out of his Dynamo Kyiv contract, and signed him to a three-year deal.

=== Lisne ===
On 20 July 2025, he moved to Lisne in Ukrainian Second League. In November 2025, he retired from professional football.

== International career ==
Rybalka was part of the Ukraine U-19 team that won the 2009 UEFA European Under-19 Championship. On 27 July 2009, in the last match of the group stage against Switzerland, with hosts Ukraine playing a man down and facing elimination from the tournament, Rybalka scored in the 85th minute to establish the final score (1-0), and to propel Ukraine into the semifinal round. He ended up playing in three of his team's five matches, including the Final against England.

On 31 March 2015, Rybalka made his senior team debut for Ukraine in a friendly match against Latvia, coming on at half-time for Dynamo Kyiv teammate Denys Garmash. He became a regular player for Ukraine for the remainder of the UEFA Euro 2016 qualifying, featuring in the last six matches, including the play-offs against Slovenia. Rybalka was on Ukraine's squad for the UEFA Euro 2016 final tournament in France, but did not play in any of his team's matches.

== Career statistics ==
=== Club ===
As of 19 May 2019

Club statistics
Club	Season	League			Cup		Continental		Other		Total	
Club	Season	Division	Apps	Goals	Apps	Goals	Apps	Goals	Apps	Goals	Apps	Goals
Arsenal Kharkiv	2006–07	Ukrainian Second League	13	4	1	0	—		—		14	4
Arsenal Kharkiv	2007–08	Ukrainian Second League	35	16	2	2	—		—		37	18
Arsenal Kharkiv	Total		48	20	3	2	—		—		51	22
Dynamo-2 Kyiv	2008–09	Ukrainian First League	28	3	—		—		—		28	3
Dynamo-2 Kyiv	2009–10	Ukrainian First League	29	7	—		—		—		29	7
Dynamo-2 Kyiv	2010–11	Ukrainian First League	18	3	—		—		—		18	3
Dynamo-2 Kyiv	Total		75	13	—		—		—		75	13
Dynamo Kyiv	2011–12	Ukrainian Premier League	2	0	1	1	—		—		3	1
Dynamo Kyiv	2014–15	Ukrainian Premier League	22	1	7	0	11 (Note: All appearance(s) in UEFA Europa League)	0	1 (Note: Appearance in Ukrainian Super Cup)	0	41	1
Dynamo Kyiv	2015–16	Ukrainian Premier League	17	0	1	0	7 (Note: All appearance(s) in UEFA Champions League)	0	1	0	26	0
Dynamo Kyiv	2016–17	Ukrainian Premier League	26	1	3	0	5	0	—		34	1
Dynamo Kyiv	Total		67	2	12	1	23	0	2	0	104	3
Slovan Liberec (loan)	2012–13	Czech First League	14	2	4	0	11	3	—		29	5
Slovan Liberec (loan)	2013–14	Czech First League	23	6	1	0	2	0	—		26	6
Slovan Liberec (loan)	Total		37	8	5	0	13	3	—		55	11
Sivasspor (loan)	2017–18	Süper Lig	21	1	1	0	—		—		22	1
Sivasspor	2018–19	Süper Lig	26	2	1	0	—		—		27	2
Sivasspor	Total		26	2	1	0	—		—		27	2
Career Total			274	46	22	3	36	3	2	0	334	52

=== International ===
As of 19 May 2019

Appearances and goals by national team and year
National Team	Year	Apps	Goals
Ukraine	2015	8	0
Ukraine	2016	1	0
Total		9	0

== Honours ==
Dynamo Kyiv

- Ukrainian Premier League: 2014–15, 2015–16
- Ukrainian Cup: 2014–15
- Ukrainian Super Cup: 2016

Other

- 2009 UEFA European Under-19 Football Championship: Champion
