= Vilkhivtsi, Zakarpattia Oblast =

Village in Zakarpattia Oblast, Ukraine

Vilkhivtsi Вільхівці: Vulchovce (Czech); Irhóc (Hungarian); Вульховцѣ (Rusyn); ווילחאוויץ (Yiddish)
- Village
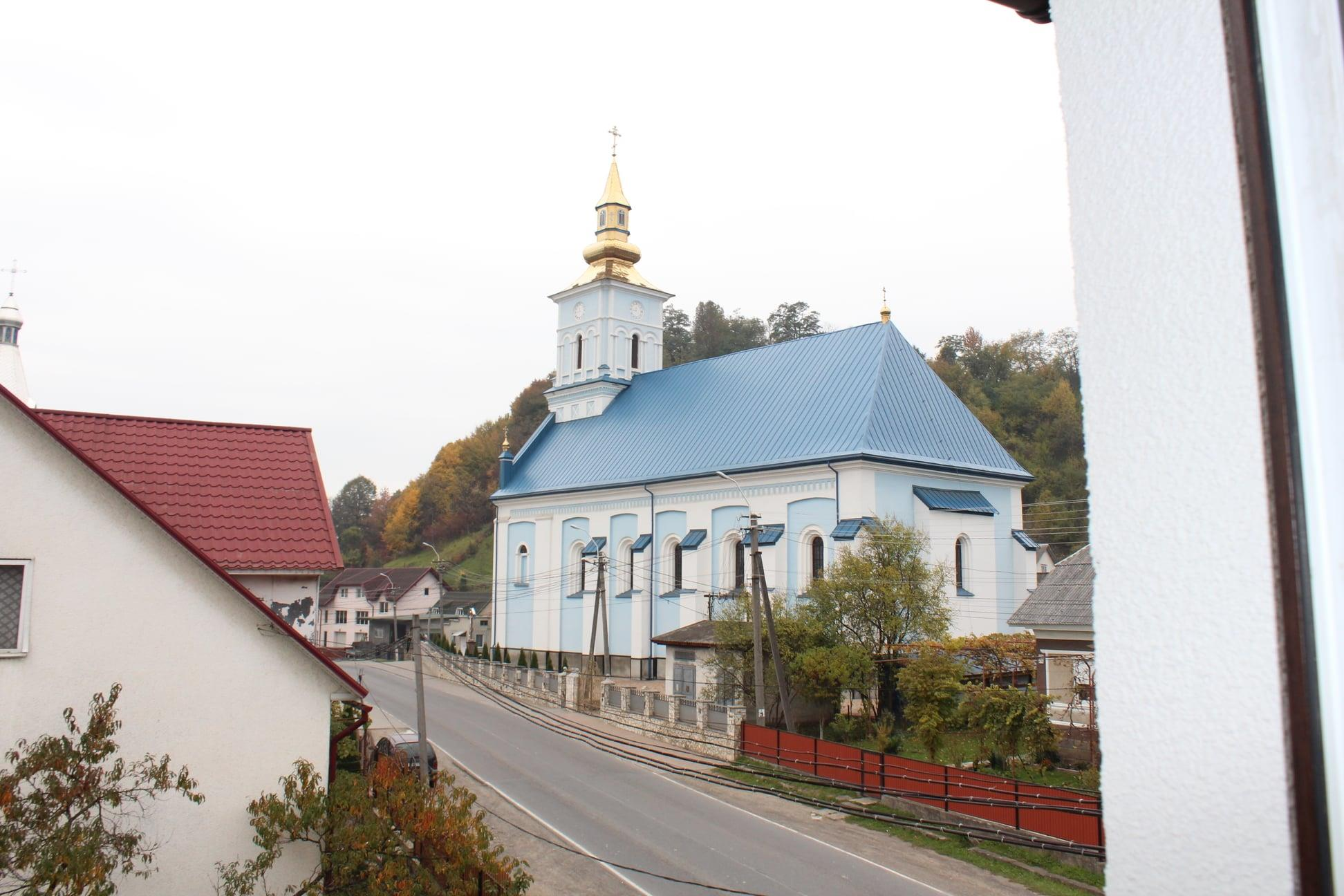

- Location of Vilkhivtsi in Zakarpattia Oblast Location of Vilkhivtsi in Ukraine
- Coordinates: 48°05′57″N 23°44′22″E
- Country: Ukraine
- Oblast: Zakarpattia Oblast
- Raion: Tiachiv Raion
- First mentioned: 1389

Population (2025)
  - Total: 3,374

Vilkhivtsi (Ukrainian: Вільхівці; Czech: Vulchovce; Hungarian: Irhóc; Rusyn: Вульховцѣ, romanized: Vulkhovtsi; Yiddish: ווילחאוויץ, romanized: Vilkhovitz) is a village in Tiachiv Raion, in the western Zakarpattia Oblast of Ukraine. It is the administrative centre of Vilkhivtsi rural hromada, one of the hromadas of Ukraine. Its population is 3,374 (as of 2025).

== Overview ==
Vilkhivtsi was first mentioned in 1389, when it was ruled under feudalism. The village of Dobrianske was split from it in 1419, and the Communist Party of Czechoslovakia operated in the village from 1921. The city was captured by the Soviet Union on 21 October 1944, during World War II, and subsequently integrated into the Ukrainian Soviet Socialist Republic. A 6,700-hectare collective farm was established, with cattle and sheep as livestock.

It is split into two halves separated by a 544 m (0.338 mi) hill. There are two hotels in the village. Vilkhivtsi is also home to a synagogue. Constructed c. 1705, it is one of Ukraine's oldest surviving synagogues. It was rebuilt in 2020 and currently houses a museum to Jewish life.

== Notable people ==
- Vasyl Shchobei, Ukrainian politician and member of the Soim
