= Denys Skepskyi =

Ukrainian footballer (born 1987)

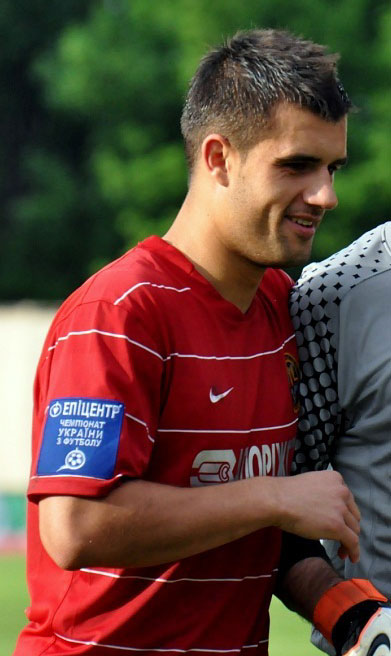
- Denys Skepskyi after the game for FC Metalurh Zaporizhya

Personal information
- Full name: Denys Volodymyrovych Skepskyi
- Date of birth: 5 July 1987 (age 39)
- Place of birth: Chernihiv, Ukraine, Soviet Union
- Height: 1.78 m (5 ft 10 in)
- Position: Midfielder

Youth career
- 2000–2003: Yunist Chernihiv
- 2002–2003: SDYuShOR Desna
- 2003–2004: Desna-2 Chernihiv
- 2004: Dynamo Kyiv

Senior career*
Years	Team	Apps	(Gls)
2003	Desna Chernihiv	2	(0)
2004	Dynamo-3 Kyiv	19	(2)
2004–2006	Dynamo-2 Kyiv	23	(1)
2006–2009	Dynamo Moscow	5	(0)
2010–2011	Volgar-Gazprom Astrakhan	19	(3)
2011	→ Metalurh Zaporizhya (loan)	4	(2)
2011	Desna Chernihiv	7	(3)
2012	Belshina Bobruisk	16	(0)
2012	Poltava	14	(5)
2013	Torpedo Moscow	12	(1)
2014	Sakhalin Yuzhno-Sakhalinsk	7	(0)
2015	Desna Chernihiv	12	(3)
2015–2017	Cherkaskyi Dnipro	38	(12)
2017	Desna Chernihiv	14	(0)
2018	Mykolaiv	5	(0)
2018	Polissya Zhytomyr	7	(1)
2019	Shevardeni-1906 Tbilisi	26	(3)
2020–2022	Viktoriya Mykolaivka	0	(0)
2022–2023	Niva Buzova	15	(3)
2023	Kudrivka	17	(3)
2024	Lisne	32	(5)

International career^{‡}
2005	Ukraine U18	12	(2)
2005	Ukraine U19	7	(0)
2006	Ukraine U21	3	(0)

Managerial career
- 2025: Lisne (coach)
- 2025–: Lisne (Athletic trainer)
- * Club domestic league appearances and goals as of 31 December 2023 ‡ National team caps and goals as of 12 August 2015

Denys Volodymyrovych Skepskyi (Ukrainian: Денис Володимирович Скепський; born 5 July 1987) is a Ukrainian former footballer who played as defensive midfielder. He is currently a coach for Ukrainian club Lisne.

== Playing career ==
He started his career at Yunist Chernihiv before moving to SDYuShOR Desna and Dynamo Kyiv academies. In 2013 he moved to Torpedo Moscow in the Russian Football National League and signed a two-year contract. He helped the club to be promoted in Russian Premier League, but in July 2014 he was released by the club. In 2019 he moved to Shevardeni-1906 Tbilisi in Erovnuli Liga 2. In 2018 he moved to Niva Buzova in the Ukrainian First League.

In 2023 he signed for Kudrivka in the Ukrainian Second League. In January 2024 he was released by the club.

== Managerial career ==
In 2025, he was appointed as a coach of Lisne.

== Honours ==
Niva Buzova

- Ukrainian Second League: 2022–23

Viktoriya Mykolaivka

- Ukrainian Football Amateur League: 2019–20
- Ukrainian Amateur Cup: Runners-up 2019–20

Desna Chernihiv

- Ukrainian First League: 2017–18

FC Metalurh Zaporizhya

- Ukrainian First League: 2011–12
