= Vadym Melnyk =

Ukrainian footballer

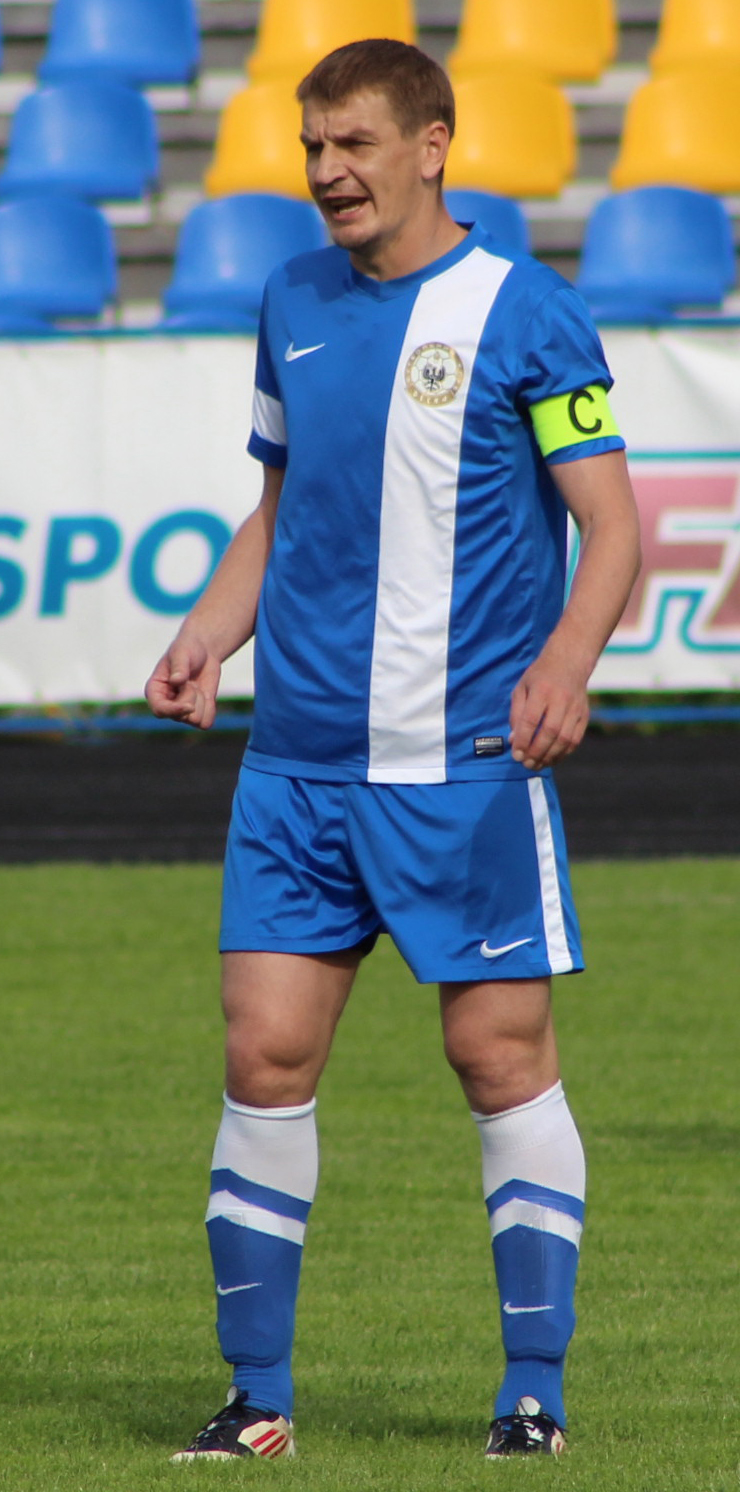

Personal information
- Full name: Vadym Vasylevych Melnyk
- Date of birth: 16 May 1980 (age 46)
- Place of birth: Nemovychi, Rivne Oblast, Ukrainian SSR
- Height: 1.86 m (6 ft 1 in)
- Position: Defensive midfielder

Senior career*
Years	Team	Apps	(Gls)
1997–1998	Veres Rivne	36	(2)
1999–2005	Borysfen Boryspil	184	(33)
2002	→ Borysfen-2 Boryspil	1	(1)
2005–2007	Metalurh Donetsk	43	(1)
2005	→ Tavriya Simferopol (loan)	10	(1)
2008–2011	Illichivets Mariupol	67	(6)
2011–2012	Bukovyna Chernivtsi	45	(5)
2012–2018	Desna Chernihiv	173	(13)
Total		559	(62)

Managerial career
- 2020–2022: FC Desna Chernihiv (Technical Director)
- 2025: FC Lisne (Assistant coach)
- 2025: FC Lisne (coach)
- * Club domestic league appearances and goals as of 29 October 2018

Vadym Melnyk (Ukrainian: Мельник Вадим Васильевич; born 16 May 1980) is a Ukrainian former professional footballer who played as a defender.

== Career ==
=== Veres Rivne ===
In 1997 he moved to Veres Rivne in Ukrainian Second League, where in the season 1997–98, he played 36 matches and scored 2 goals and got the 4th place in the league.

=== Borysfen Boryspil ===
In 1999 he moved to Borysfen Boryspil until 2005, where he played 184 matches and scored 33 goals and he won the Ukrainian Second League in the season 1999–2000.

=== Metalurh Donetsk ===
He was acquired from Metalurh Donetsk during the 2007–08 transfer season.

=== Desna Chernihiv ===
In 2012 he moved to Desna Chernihiv until 2018, where he become also the captain and he won Ukrainian Second League in the season 2012–13 and he got promoted in Ukrainian Premier League after the season 2017–18 in Ukrainian First League.

== After Retirement ==
=== Technical Director ===
In 2020 he was appointed as Technical Sport Director of Desna Chernihiv. In 2020 he commented the chance for the club to be qualify for the in Europe League and the big result that the club gained after qualified for Ukrainian Premier League. In August 2021, Melnyk confirmed the that Yevhen Khacheridi, left Desna training camp after spending about three weeks in the location of the club of Chernihiv, with which he maintained training form, the parties did not come to a common denominator regarding the signing of the contract. Khacheridi left the training camp of Oleksandr Ryabokon's team on his own initiative. It is unknown whether the search for a new club will continue.

=== Coach ===
In a recent interview, director of FC Lisne, Viktor Zelinsky confirmed that Oleksandr Ryabokon has resigned as a coach and Melnyk replaced him as coach of the team

== Honours ==
Desna Chernihiv

- Ukrainian First League: 2017–18
- Ukrainian Second League: 2012–13

Borysfen Boryspil

- Ukrainian Second League: 1999–2000
