= Tsentralnyi Stadion (Makariv) =

Stadium in Makariv, Ukraine

- Центральний ім. М.Х. Бруквенка
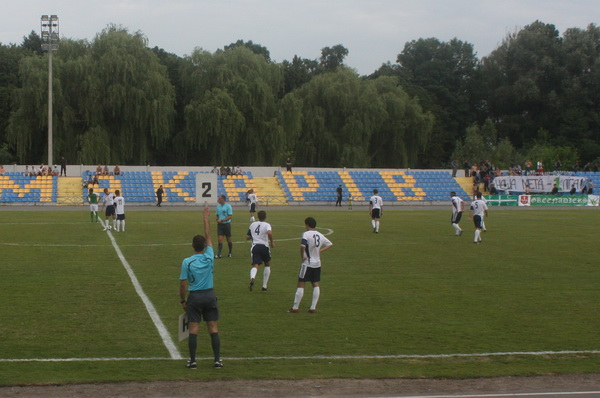
- Interactive map of Tsentralnyi Stadion
- Full name: Tsentralnyi Stadion imeni Mykhaila Brukvenka
- Location: Bohdan Khmelnytskyi Street, 25 Makariv, Ukraine
- Coordinates: 50°27′31″N 29°48′17″E
- Capacity: 3,100

Tenants
- Chaika; Lisne 2025; Rebel Kyiv since 2025; Kudrivka U21 since 2026

Tsentralnyi Stadion imeni Mykhaila Brukvenka (Ukrainian: Центральний стадіон імені Михайла Бруквенка) is a football stadium in Makariv, Ukraine. It is the home stadium of Chaika.

It is a Ukrainian Association of Football Category 1 stadium. Stadium is named for Mykhailo Brukvenko, a local physical education teacher who taught for fifty years.

== Gallery ==
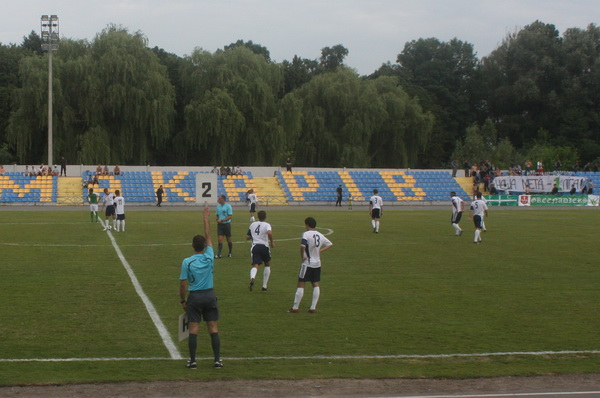

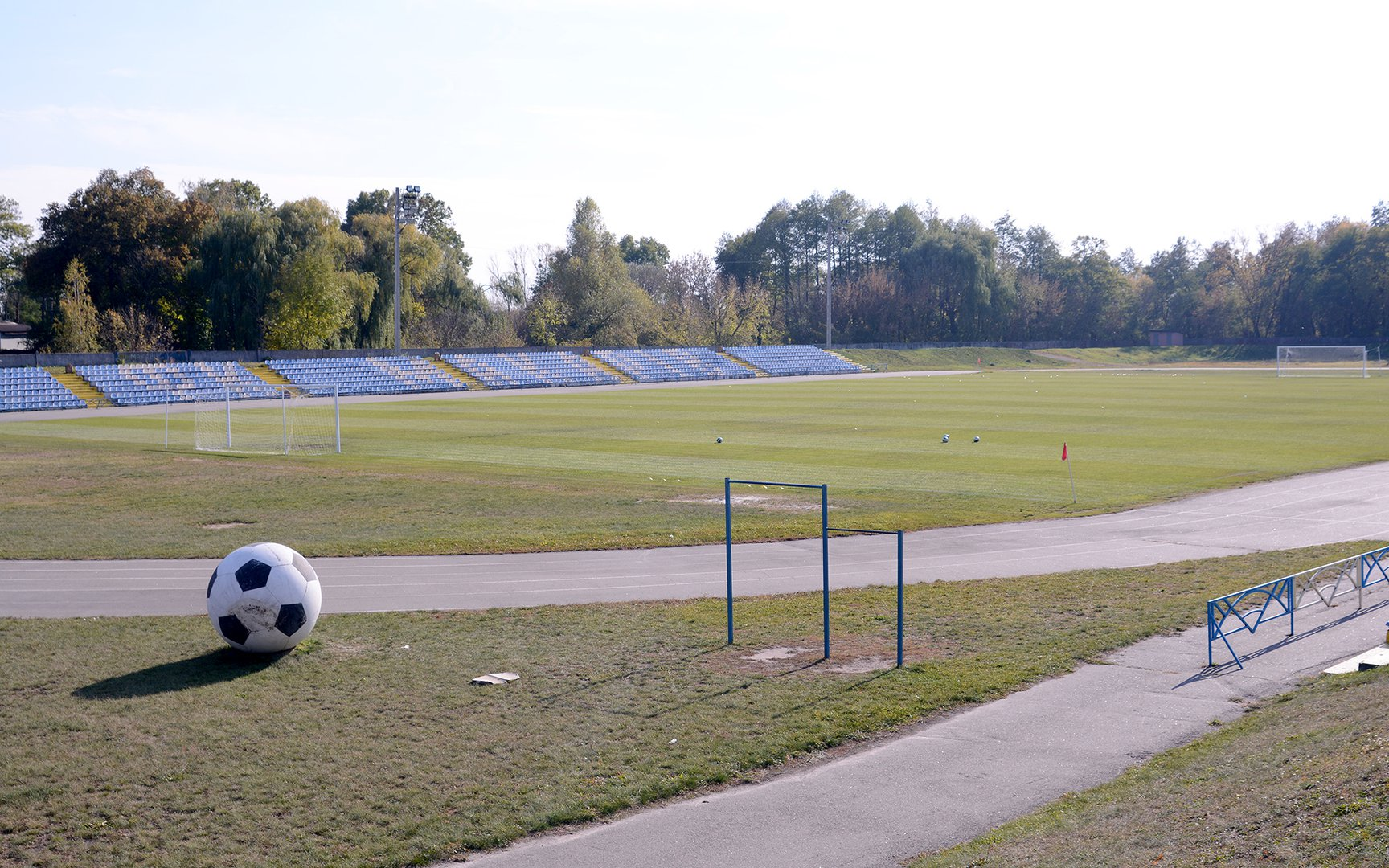

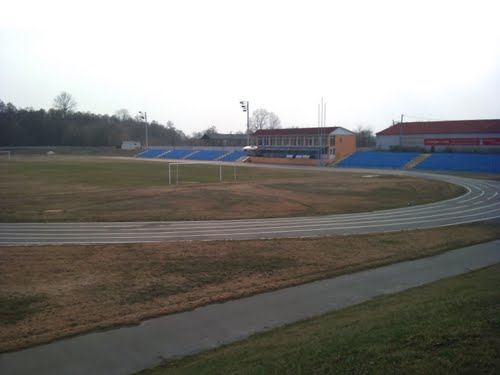

== See also ==
- Tsentralnyi Stadion
