= FC Lisne =

- Full name: Football Club Lisne
- Founded: 2023
- Dissolved: 2025
- Ground: Buzova Arena, Buzova; Tsentralnyi Stadion, Makariv
- Capacity: 200
- Owner: Oleksandr Meshkov
- Director: Viktor Zelinskyi
- Manager: Vadym Melnyk
- League: Ukrainian Second League
- 2024–25: Ukrainian Football Amateur League 1st of Group 1 (Quarterfinals)
Home colours	Away colours

Football Club Lisne (Ukrainian: Футбольний клуб «Лісне») is a Ukrainian football club based in Lisne, located in the Bucha Raion district. The team was recently admitted to the Ukrainian Second League.

== Historʏ ==
=== Foundation ===
The club was founded in 2023 as part of a project aimed at developing football among children and youth in the Kyiv region. Starting from 2023, the club became one of the leaders of the Kyiv Oblast football, placing 4th in its first season at regional competitions. In 2024, Lisne was admitted to the national amateur league competitions while continuing to play at the Kyiv Oblast top tier. While placing first at the 2024–25 Kyiv Oblast football championship, the club was equal on points with FC Kalynivka and had to play against them for the season's title, which they lost. During the same season, Lisne managed to win its group at amateur league competitions, yet were eliminated at the post-season playoffs at the quarter-finals. On 31 January 2024, FC Lisne paid off the debts of another football club from Lisne, Ronin Lisne.

=== Ukrainian Second League ===
In 2025 the club hired well-known manager Oleksandr Ryabokon with the ambition of being promoted to the Ukrainian Second League. The team, having good financial conditions, committed to obtaining professional status. Former Dynamo Kyiv players Denys Skepskyi, Serhiy Rybalka and Denys Harmash were invited to join the team, as well as other players with experience in the Ukrainian Premier League. Denys Skepskyi was appointed as a coach. In June 2025, the club was admitted in Ukrainian Second League for the first time. In July 2025 the club signed Vladyslav Ohirya. On 14 August 2025 the club signed Illya Karavashchenko with one-year loan contract from Kudrivka.

After failing to show up for the matches against FC Uzhhorod and Vilkhivtsi, the club was suspended from the Ukrainian Second League without the possibility of returning the following season.

== Infrastructure ==
=== Stadium ===
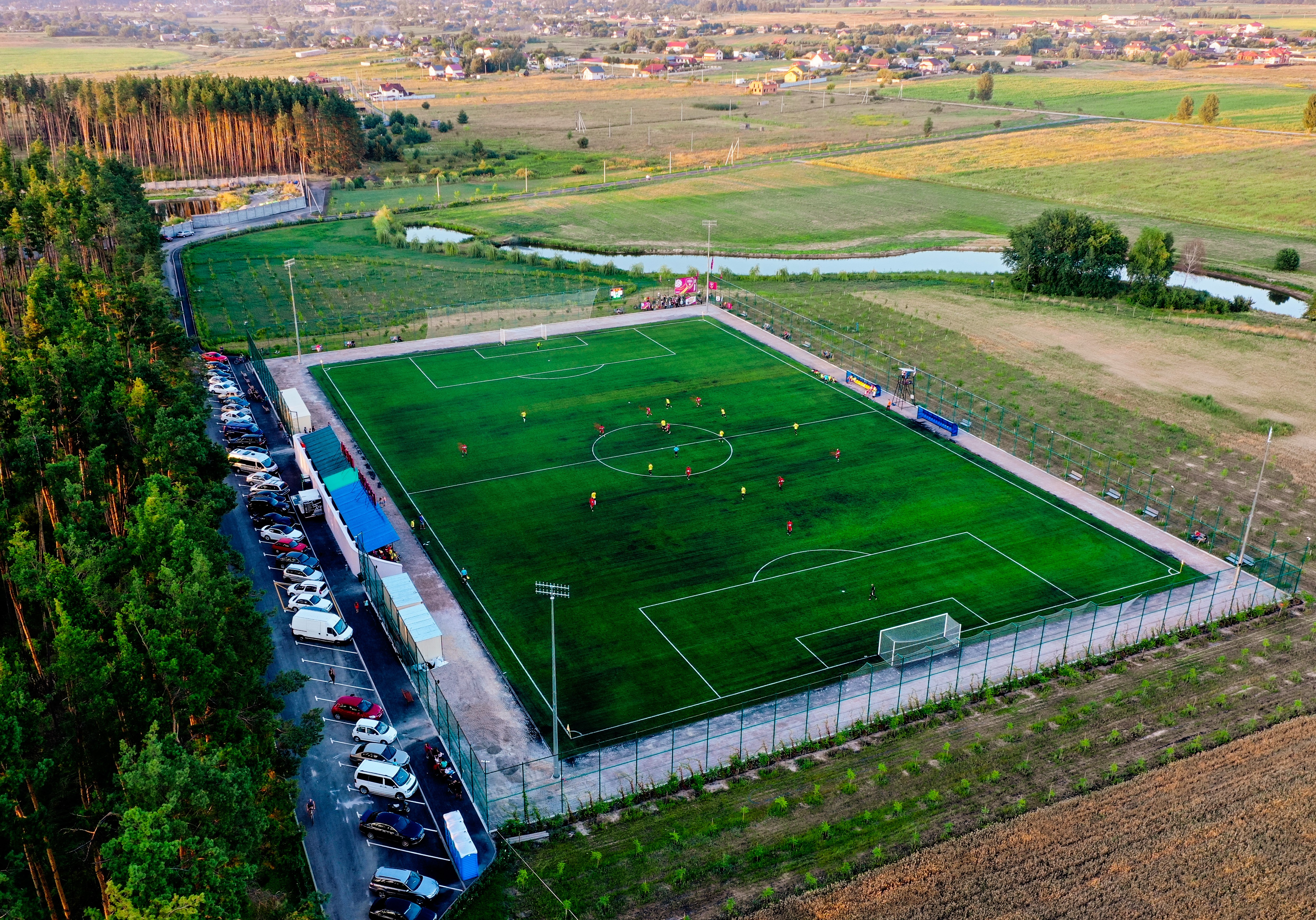
Buzova Arena in Buzova

The team played their games at the Buzova Arena in Buzova, which is also located in Dmytrivka community, the same as Lisne. The stadium was built in 2018 for 2,000 spectators. Originally built by Nyva Buzova, the stadium was passed on to FC Kudrivka following their merger.

After being admitted to the Ukrainian Second League the club used the Tsentralnyi Stadion in Makariv.

== Honours ==
=== Team ===
- Kyiv Oblast championship
  - Runners-up: 2024–25

=== Individual Player & Coach awards ===
Top Scorer of Ukrainian Amateur League

- (Ukraine) Nazar Voloshyn: 2024–25 (15 goals)

== League and cup history ==
Season	Div.	Pos.	Pl.	W	D	L	GS	GA	P	Domestic Cup	Europe		Notes
2024–25	4th Group 1	1_{/10}	18	13	3	2	62	12	42	-	-	-	Admitted to SL
2025–26	3th Group A	4/11	14	7	3	5	28	26	21	Round of 16 (1/8)	-	-	Expelled

== Coaches ==
- (Ukraine) Oleksandr Rozghon (2024–2025)
- (Ukraine) Denys Skepskyi (2025)
- (Ukraine) Oleksandr Ryabokon (2025)
- (Ukraine) Vadym Melnyk (2025)

== See also ==
- Buzova Arena
- Tsentralnyi Stadion
