= 2023–24 FC Skala 1911 Stryi season =

Skala Stryi
2023–24 season
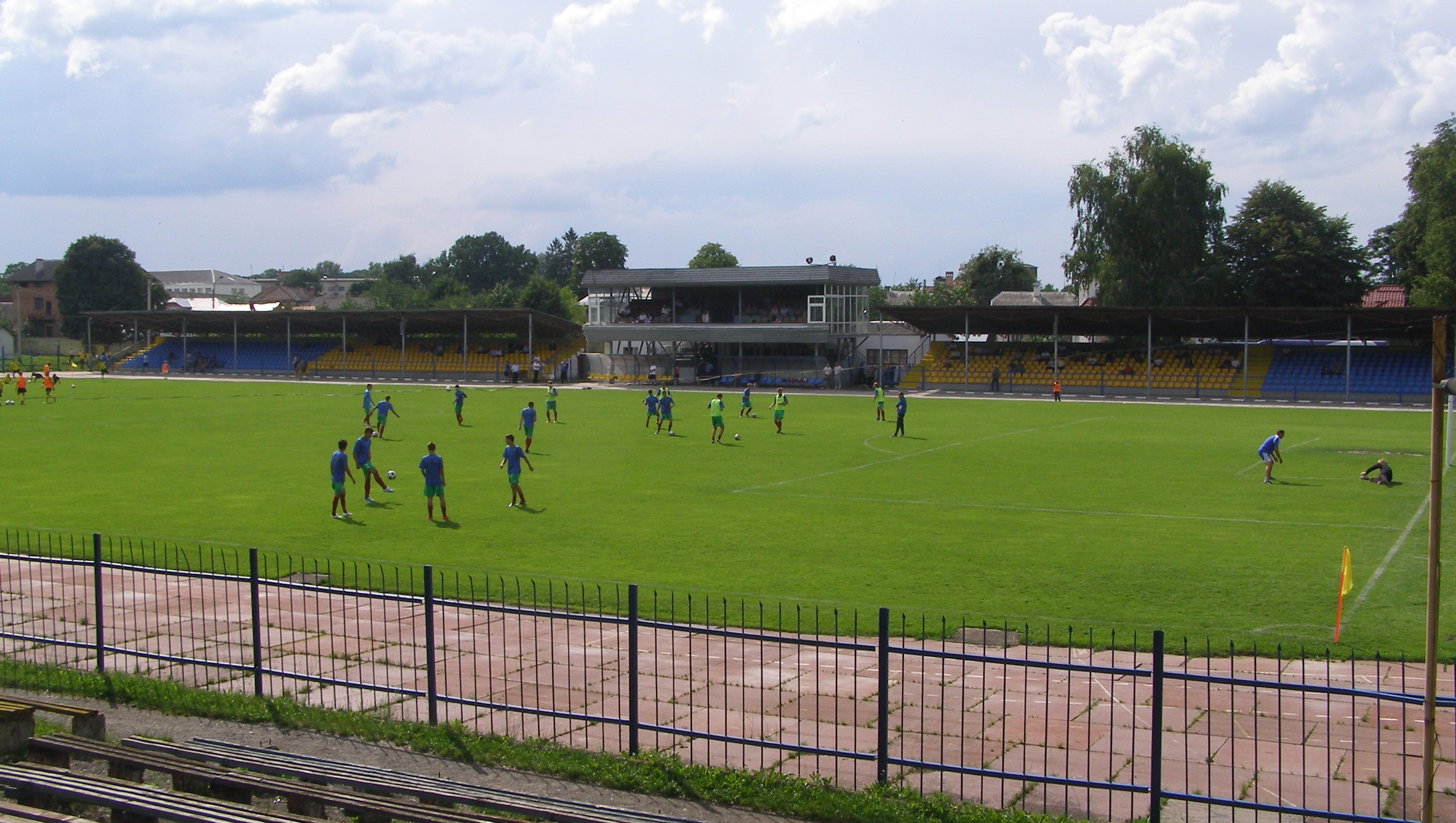
- Manager: Mykola Vasylyshyn (until 30 September 2023); Mykhailo Basarab (from 30 September 2023 until the end of the season)
- Stadium: Sokil Stadium
- Ukrainian Second League: Ukrainian Second League, 6th
- Ukrainian Cup: Round of 32 (1/16)
- Top goalscorer: League: Maksym Averyanov (6); All: Maksym Averyanov (9)
- Biggest win: Skala Stryi 3-0 Kremin-2
- Biggest defeat: UCSA 3-0 Skala Stryi
| Home colours | Away colours |

During the 2023–24 season, FC Skala Stryi (1911) competed in the Ukrainian Second League. The club used the Sokil Stadium.

== Season summary ==
Mykola Vasylyshyn was appointed as coach. In November 2023 Mykhailo Basarab was named the interim manager replacing Mykola Vasylyshyn and later he was appointed as permanent manager for Skala. In the winter transfer session, the club purchase players with some experience such as Illya Tsurkan, Oleksandr Rudenko, Andriy Ralyuchenko from UCSA Tarasivka, Kudrivka and Mynai, respectively.

== Players ==
=== Squad information ===
As of 10 October 2025

| Squad no. | Name | Nationality | Position | Date of birth (age) |
Goalkeepers
| 1 | Denys Zavhorodniy | (Ukraine) | GK | 15 January 1991 (aged 32) |
| 33 | Kostyantyn Solobchuk | (Ukraine) | GK | 11 April 2000 (aged 23) |
| 71 | Oleksandr Chernyatynsky | (Ukraine) | GK | 26 February 1999 (aged 24) |
| 99 | Vladyslav Savchenko | (Ukraine) | GK | 4 February 2004 (aged 19) |
Defenders
| 2 | Yuriy Flyak | (Ukraine) | DF | 28 April 1994 (aged 29) |
| 4 | Artur Yanata | (Ukraine) | DF | 31 October 1995 (aged 27) |
| 19 | Roman Tsen | (Ukraine) | DF | 2 December 1997 (aged 25) |
| 20 | Roman Nykolyshyn | (Ukraine) | DF | 5 September 1997 (aged 25) |
| 34 | Oleksandr Rudenko | (Ukraine) | DF | 24 October 1998 (aged 24) |
| 34 | Oleksandr Aksyonov | (Ukraine) | DF | 7 January 1994 (aged 29) |
| 44 | Ivan Pastukh | (Ukraine) | DF | 18 March 1998 (aged 25) |
Midfielders
| 6 | Andriy Ralyuchenko | (Ukraine) | MF | 8 June 1995 (aged 29) |
| 7 | Volodymyr Lukyanchenko | (Ukraine) | MF | 5 June 2002 (aged 21) |
| 10 | Bogdan Ivanchenko | (Ukraine) | MF | 13 August 1996 (aged 26) |
| 11 | Mykyta Fomin | (Ukraine) | MF | 5 March 2005 (aged 18) |
| 14 | Mykola Tsvyk | (Ukraine) | MF | 22 May 2000 (aged 23) |
| 15 | Danylo Hrabovetskyi | (Ukraine) | MF | 18 March 2000 (aged 23) |
| 17 | Andriy Petryk | (Ukraine) | MF | 17 February 2002 (aged 21) |
| 21 | Oleksandr Chepelyuk | (Ukraine) | MF | 5 September 1997 (aged 25) |
| 22 | Maksym Averyanov | (Ukraine) | MF | 22 July 1997 (aged 25) |
| 26 | Illya Tsurkan | (Ukraine) | MF | 17 April 2002 (aged 21) |
| 27 | Andriy Ralyuchenko | (Ukraine) | MF | 8 June 1995 (aged 28) |
| 27 | Oleksandr Baranyuk | (Ukraine) | MF | 31 March 2003 (aged 20) |
| 77 | Sergiy Lebedev | (Ukraine) | MF | 30 August 2003 (aged 19) |
Forwards
| 8 | Roman Lisovyk | (Ukraine) | FW | 26 December 2001 (aged 21) |
| 9 | Taras Puchkovskyi | (Ukraine) | FW | 23 August 1994 (aged 28) |
| 16 | Valentyn Napuda | (Ukraine) (Hungary) | FW | 19 February 2005 (aged 18) |
| 18 | Vadym Merdyeyev | (Ukraine) | FW | 13 August 2002 (aged 20) |
| 18 | Dmytro Humenyak | (Ukraine) | FW | 15 May 2001 (aged 22) |
| 30 | Yevgeniy Mazur | (Ukraine) | FW | 29 January 2004 (aged 19) |
| 69 | Matviy Yanko | (Ukraine) | FW | 22 February 2004 (aged 19) |
| 77 | Vladyslav Shapoval | (Ukraine) | FW | 15 April 2001 (aged 22) |
| 97 | Nazariy Bohomaz | (Ukraine) | FW | 12 January 2000 (aged 23) |

== Transfers ==
=== In ===
| Date | Pos. | Player | Age | Moving from | Type | Fee | Source |
Summer
| 17 July 2023 | FW | (Ukraine) Roman Lisovyk | 21 | (Ukraine) Vilkhivtsi | Transfer | Free | |
| 17 July 2023 | DF | (Ukraine) Oleksandr Aksyonov | 29 | (Ukraine) Medeya Orikhovytsia | Transfer | Free | |
| 17 July 2023 | MF | (Ukraine) Volodymyr Lukyanchenko | 21 | (Ukraine) Dnister Zalishchyky | Transfer | Free | |
| 17 July 2023 | FW | (Ukraine) Taras Puchkovskyi | 29 | (Ukraine) Epitsentr | Transfer | Free | |
| 17 July 2023 | FW | (Ukraine) Vladyslav Shapoval | 22 | (Ukraine) Skoruk | Transfer | Free | |
| 17 July 2023 | MF | (Ukraine) Maksym Averyanov | 27 | (Ukraine) Zviahel | Transfer | Free | |
| 20 July 2023 | MF | (Ukraine) Sergey Lebedev | 20 | Unattached | Unattached | Free | |
| 20 July 2023 | GK | (Ukraine) Vladyslav Savchenko | 20 | (Ukraine) Mynai | Loan | Free | |
| 25 July 2023 | DF | (Ukraine) Ivan Pastukh | 27 | (Ukraine) Naftovyk Dolyna | Transfer | Free | |
| 4 August 2023 | MF | (Ukraine) Oleksandr Baranyuk | 21 | (Ukraine) Chornomorets OdesaU-19 | Transfer | Free | |
| 4 August 2023 | DF | (Ukraine) Yevgeniy Kuznetsov | 25 | (Ukraine) Zviahel | Transfer | Free | |
| 4 August 2023 | MF | (Ukraine) Oleksandr Baranyuk | 20 | (Ukraine) Chornomorets Odesa | Transfer | Free | |
| 11 August 2023 | FW | (Ukraine) Dmytro Humenyak | 23 | (Ukraine) Vast Mykolaiv | Transfer | Free | |
| 23 August 2023 | FW | (Ukraine) Nazariy Bohomaz | 23 | (Poland) Cosmos Nowotaniec | Transfer | Free | |
| 1 September 2023 | DF | (Ukraine) Yuriy Flyak | 29 | (Ukraine) Yunist VB | Transfer | Free | |
| 1 September 2023 | FW | (Ukraine) Valentyn Napuda | 19 | (Denmark) Sønderjyske U-19 | Transfer | Free | |
| 1 September 2023 | MF | (Ukraine) Oleksandr Chepelyuk | 26 | (Ukraine) Epitsentr | Transfer | Free | |
| 8 November 2023 | FW | (Ukraine) Dmytro Humenyak | 22 | (Ukraine) Vast Mykolaiv | Transfer | Free | |
Winter
| 27 January 2024 | DF | (Ukraine) Vadym Merdeev | 29 | (Ukraine) Mynai | Transfer | Free | |
| 5 February 2024 | DF | (Ukraine) Oleksandr Rudenko | 24 | (Ukraine) Kudrivka | Transfer | Free | |
| 5 February 2024 | MF | (Ukraine) Illya Tsurkan | 25 | (Ukraine) UCSA Tarasivka | Transfer | Free | |
| 19 February 2024 | MF | (Ukraine) Andriy Ralyuchenko | 28 | (Ukraine) Mynai | Transfer | Free | |
| 22 March 2024 | GK | (Ukraine) Oleksandr Chernyatynskyi | 24 | (Ukraine) Livyi Bereh Kyiv | Transfer | Free | |

=== Out ===
| Date | Pos. | Player | Age | Moving from | Type | Fee | Source |
Summer
| 15 April 2023 | MF | (Ukraine) Roman Dytko | 26 | Unattached | Released | Free | |
| 6 July 2023 | MF | (Ukraine) Vitaliy-Dmytro Teplyi | 25 | (Ukraine) Ahrobiznes Volochysk | Transfer | Free | |
| 10 July 2023 | MF | (Ukraine) Nazar Hrytsak | 25 | (Ukraine) Ahrobiznes Volochysk | Transfer | Free | |
| 16 July 2023 | DF | (Ukraine) Nazar Yedynak | 26 | Retired | | | |
| 28 July 2023 | FW | (Ukraine) Oleg Blyzno | 26 | (Ukraine) Karlivka | Transfer | Free | |
| 1 August 2023 | MF | (Ukraine) Danylo Hrabovetskyi | 19 | Unattached | Released | Free | |
| 5 August 2023 | FW | (Ukraine) Matviy Yanko | 20 | (Ukraine) Dnipro-1 | Transfer | Free | |
| 18 August 2023 | FW | (Ukraine) Yuriy Cherepushchak | 25 | (Ukraine) PA Zhydachiv | Transfer | Free | |
| 18 August 2023 | DF | (Ukraine) Vasyl Vasylynets | 25 | (Ukraine) Khust | Transfer | Free | |
| 1 September 2023 | DF | (Ukraine) Yevgeniy Kuznetsov | 25 | Retired | | | |
| 1 September 2023 | FW | (Ukraine) Vladyslav Shapoval | 22 | (Ukraine) Trostianets | Transfer | Free | |
| 7 September 2023 | FW | (Ukraine) Bogdan Mordas | 22 | (Ukraine) Probiy Horodenka | Transfer | Free | |
Winter
| 1 January 2024 | MF | (Ukraine) Oleksandr Baranyuk | 21 | Unattached | Released | Free | |
| 1 January 2024 | FW | (Ukraine) Dmytro Humenyak | 23 | Unattached | Released | Free | |
| 22 March 2024 | MF | (Ukraine) Mykola Tsvyk | 25 | (Ukraine) Khust | Transfer | Free | |

== Competitions ==
=== Overall record ===
| Competition | First match | Last match | Starting round | Final position | Record | | | | | | | |
| Competition | First match | Last match | Starting round | Final position | Pld | W | D | L | GF | GA | GD | Win % |
|---|---|---|---|---|---|---|---|---|---|---|---|---|
| Second League | 9 August 2023 | 17 May 2024 | Matchday 1 | 3rd | 26 | 12 | 2 | 12 | 32 | 33 | −1 | 46.15 |
| Ukrainian Cup | 2 August 2023 | 23 August 2023 | Round of 64 | Round of 16 | 3 | 2 | 0 | 1 | 7 | 5 | +2 | 66.67 |
| Total | | | | | 29 | 14 | 2 | 13 | 39 | 38 | +1 | 48.28 |

Source: Results

=== Ukrainian Second League ===
==== League table ====
| Pos | Team | Pld | W | D | L | GF | GA | GD | Pts | Promotion, qualification or relegation |
|---|---|---|---|---|---|---|---|---|---|---|
| 1 | Druzhba Myrivka (C) | 26 | 19 | 5 | 2 | 50 | 13 | +37 | 62 (Note: Head-to-head results: Druzhba – UCSA 2:1, UCSA – Druzhba 0:1) | Promotion to Ukrainian First League; Withdrawn after the season |
| 2 | UCSA Tarasivka (O, P) | 26 | 19 | 5 | 2 | 62 | 13 | +49 | 62 | Qualification to promotional play-off |
| 3 | Zviahel (O) | 26 | 19 | 4 | 3 | 63 | 17 | +46 | 61 | Promotion to Ukrainian First League; Withdrawn after the season |
| 4 | Chaika Petropavlivska Borshchahivka | 26 | 15 | 6 | 5 | 43 | 18 | +25 | 51 | |
| 5 | Karpaty-2 Lviv | 26 | 11 | 6 | 9 | 35 | 39 | −4 | 39 | Withdrawn after the season |
| 6 | Skala 1911 Stryi | 26 | 12 | 2 | 12 | 32 | 33 | −1 | 38 | |
| 7 | Kudrivka | 26 | 10 | 7 | 9 | 33 | 40 | −7 | 37 | Promotion to Ukrainian First League through merger |
| 8 | Nyva Vinnytsia | 26 | 9 | 9 | 8 | 36 | 35 | +1 | 36 | |
| 9 | Rukh-2 Lviv | 26 | 9 | 7 | 10 | 29 | 36 | −7 | 34 | |
| 10 | Lokomotyv Kyiv | 26 | 7 | 7 | 12 | 34 | 43 | −9 | 28 | |
| 11 | Trostianets | 26 | 5 | 6 | 15 | 23 | 37 | −14 | 21 | |
| 12 | Real Pharma Odesa | 26 | 5 | 4 | 17 | 17 | 51 | −34 | 19 | |
| 13 | Metalurh-2 Zaporizhzhia | 26 | 5 | 1 | 20 | 17 | 44 | −27 | 16 | Withdrawn during winter break |
| 14 | Kremin-2 Kremenchuk | 26 | 1 | 3 | 22 | 11 | 66 | −55 | 6 | Withdrawn after the season |
| - | Vast Mykolaiv | 0 | 0 | 0 | 0 | 0 | 0 | 0 | 0 | Withdrawn and record annulled |

Source: PFL.ua
Rules for classification: 1) Points; 2) Head-to-head points; 3) Head-to-head goal difference; 4) Head-to-head goals scored; 5) Goal difference in all games; 6) Goals scored in all games (Note: calculation by criteria indicated in rules 2, 3, 4 is conducted with consideration of all teams that have equal number of tournament points at the moment of calculation and not only among those which after preliminary criteria have appeared more successful).
(C) Champions; (O) Play-off winners; (P) Promoted

=== Ukrainian Cup ===
| 2 August 2023 Round of 128 (1/64) | FC Skala Stryi | 5-2 | Khust | Stryi, Lviv Oblast |
| EEST (UTC+3) | Averyanov 2', 47'; Pastukh 36', 85'; Mazur 22' | Report | 57' V.Lutsiv; 90+2' P.Lutsiv | Stadium: Sokil; Referee: M.Lypko (Ivano-Frankivsk |

| 16 August 2023 Round of 64 (1/32) | FC Skala Stryi | 2-1 | Nyva Ternopil | Stryi, Lviv Oblast |
| EEST (UTC+3) | Lukyachenko 90+1'; Nykolyshyn 120' | Report | 58' Khrustavka | Stadium: Sokil; Referee: V. Zaprutnyak (Vinnytsia) |

| 23 August 2023 Round of 32 (1/16) | FC Skala Stryi | 0-2 | Rukh Lviv | Stryi, Lviv Oblast |
| EEST (UTC+3) | | Report | Kvasnytsya 16'; Stolyarchuk 70' | Stadium: Sokil; Referee: O.Afanasyev (Kharkiv) |

== Statistics ==
=== Appearances and goals ===
| No. | Pos | Nat | Player | Total | | Ukrainian Second League | | Cup | | Play-offs | |
| No. | Pos | Nat | Player | Apps | Goals | Apps | Goals | Apps | Goals | Apps | Goals |
Goalkeepers
| 1 | GK | (Ukraine) UKR | Denys Zavgorodniy | 13 | 0 | 11 | 0 | 2 | 0 | 0 | 0 |
| 33 | GK | (Ukraine) UKR | Kostyantyn Solobchuk | 0 | 0 | 0 | 0 | 0 | 0 | 0 | 0 |
| 71 | GK | (Ukraine) UKR | Oleksandr Chernyatynskyi | 4 | 0 | 1 | 0 | 3 | 0 | 0 | 0 |
| 99 | GK | (Ukraine) UKR | Vladyslav Savchenko | 15 | 0 | 14 | 0 | 1 | 0 | 0 | 0 |
Defenders
| 2 | DF | (Ukraine) UKR | Yuriy Flyak | 5 | 0 | 5 | 0 | 0 | 0 | 0 | 0 |
| 4 | DF | (Ukraine) UKR | Artur Yanata | 25 | 3 | 23 | 3 | 2 | 0 | 0 | 0 |
| 19 | DF | (Ukraine) UKR | Roman Tsen | 26 | 0 | 23 | 0 | 3 | 0 | 0 | 0 |
| 20 | DF | (Ukraine) UKR | Roman Nykolyshyn | 10 | 3 | 9 | 3 | 1 | 0 | 0 | 0 |
| 34 | DF | (Ukraine) UKR | Oleksandr Rudenko | 9 | 0 | 9 | 0 | 0 | 0 | 0 | 0 |
| 44 | DF | (Ukraine) UKR | Ivan Pastukh | 27 | 2 | 24 | 0 | 3 | 2 | 0 | 0 |
Midfielders
| 5 | MF | (Ukraine) UKR | Andriy Lebedenko | 7 | 0 | 4 | 0 | 3 | 0 | 0 | 0 |
| 7 | MF | (Ukraine) UKR | Volodymyr Lukyanchenko | 27 | 1 | 24 | 0 | 3 | 1 | 0 | 0 |
| 10 | MF | (Ukraine) UKR | Bogdan Ivanchenko | 20 | 3 | 17 | 3 | 3 | 0 | 0 | 0 |
| 11 | MF | (Ukraine) UKR | Mykyta Fomin | 24 | 1 | 22 | 1 | 2 | 0 | 0 | 0 |
| 15 | MF | (Ukraine) UKR | Danylo Hrabovetskyi | 12 | 0 | 9 | 0 | 3 | 0 | 0 | 0 |
| 17 | MF | (Ukraine) UKR | Andriy Petryk | 15 | 0 | 12 | 0 | 3 | 0 | 0 | 0 |
| 21 | MF | (Ukraine) UKR | Oleksandr Chepelyuk | 20 | 0 | 20 | 0 | 0 | 0 | 0 | 0 |
| 22 | MF | (Ukraine) UKR | Maksym Averyanov | 27 | 8 | 24 | 6 | 3 | 2 | 0 | 0 |
| 26 | MF | (Ukraine) UKR | Illya Tsurkan | 6 | 0 | 6 | 0 | 0 | 0 | 0 | 0 |
| 27 | MF | (Ukraine) UKR | Andriy Ralyuchenko | 8 | 1 | 8 | 1 | 0 | 0 | 0 | 0 |
| 77 | MF | (Ukraine) UKR | Sergiy Lebedev | 20 | 3 | 20 | 3 | 0 | 0 | 0 | 0 |
Forwards
| 8 | FW | (Ukraine) UKR | Roman Lisovyk | 24 | 5 | 22 | 5 | 2 | 0 | 0 | 0 |
| 9 | FW | (Ukraine) UKR | Taras Puchkovskyi | 25 | 4 | 22 | 4 | 3 | 0 | 0 | 0 |
| 16 | FW | (Ukraine) UKR | Valentyn Napuda | 13 | 0 | 13 | 0 | 0 | 0 | 0 | 0 |
| 18 | FW | (Ukraine) UKR | Vadym Merdyeyev | 8 | 0 | 7 | 0 | 1 | 0 | 0 | 0 |
| 30 | FW | (Ukraine) UKR | Yevgeniy Mazur | 16 | 2 | 14 | 1 | 2 | 1 | 0 | 0 |
| 69 | FW | (Ukraine) UKR | Matviy Yanko | 0 | 0 | 0 | 0 | 0 | 0 | 0 | 0 |
Players transferred out during the season
| 14 | MF | (Ukraine) UKR | Mykola Tsvyk | 14 | 0 | 11 | 0 | 3 | 0 | 0 | 0 |
| 18 | FW | (Ukraine) UKR | Dmytro Humenyak | 5 | 0 | 5 | 0 | 0 | 0 | 0 | 0 |
| 27 | MF | (Ukraine) UKR | Oleksandr Baranyuk | 3 | 0 | 2 | 0 | 1 | 0 | 0 | 0 |
| 34 | DF | (Ukraine) UKR | Oleksandr Aksyonov | 3 | 0 | 2 | 0 | 1 | 0 | 0 | 0 |
| 77 | FW | (Ukraine) UKR | Vladyslav Shapoval | 1 | 0 | 0 | 0 | 1 | 0 | 0 | 0 |
| 97 | FW | (Ukraine) UKR | Nazariy Bohomaz | 8 | 0 | 7 | 0 | 1 | 0 | 0 | 0 |

Source: Competitions

Last updated: 9 October 2025

=== Goalscorers ===
| Rank | No. | Pos | Nat | Name | Second League | Cup | Play-offs | Total |
|---|---|---|---|---|---|---|---|---|
| 1 | 22 | MF | (Ukraine) | Maksym Averyanov | 6 | 3 | 0 | 9 |
| 2 | 8 | FW | (Ukraine) | Roman Lisovyk | 5 | 0 | 0 | 5 |
| 3 | 9 | FW | (Ukraine) | Taras Puchkovskyi | 4 | 0 | 0 | 4 |
| 4 | 10 | MF | (Ukraine) | Bogdan Ivanchenko | 3 | 0 | 0 | 3 |
| 5 | 4 | DF | (Ukraine) | Artur Yanata | 3 | 0 | 0 | 3 |
| 6 | 20 | DF | (Ukraine) | Roman Nykolyshyn | 3 | 0 | 0 | 3 |
| 7 | 77 | MF | (Ukraine) | Sergiy Lebedev | 3 | 0 | 0 | 3 |
| 8 | 30 | FW | (Ukraine) | Yevgeniy Mazur | 2 | 1 | 0 | 3 |
| 9 | 10 | MF | (Ukraine) | Maksym Averyanov | 0 | 2 | 0 | 2 |
| 10 | 44 | DF | (Ukraine) | Ivan Pastukh | 0 | 2 | 0 | 2 |
| 11 | 11 | MF | (Ukraine) | Mykyta Fomin | 1 | 0 | 0 | 1 |
| 12 | 7 | MF | (Ukraine) | Volodymyr Lukyachenko | 0 | 1 | 0 | 1 |
| | | | | Total | 30 | 9 | 0 | 39 |

Last updated: 10 October 2025

=== Clean sheets ===
| Rank | No. | Pos | Nat | Name | Second League | Cup | Play-offs | Total |
|---|---|---|---|---|---|---|---|---|
| 1 | 33 | GK | (Ukraine) | Kostyantyn Solobchuk | 3 | 0 | 0 | 3 |
| 2 | 1 | GK | (Ukraine) | Denys Zavgorodniy | 1 | 0 | 0 | 1 |
| 3 | 71 | GK | (Ukraine) | Oleksandr Chernyatynskyi | 0 | 1 | 0 | 1 |
| | | | | Total | 4 | 1 | 0 | 5 |

Last updated: 7 October 2025
