= 2024–25 FC Skala 1911 Stryi season =

Ukrainian football club's season 2024-2025

Skala Stryi
2024–25 season
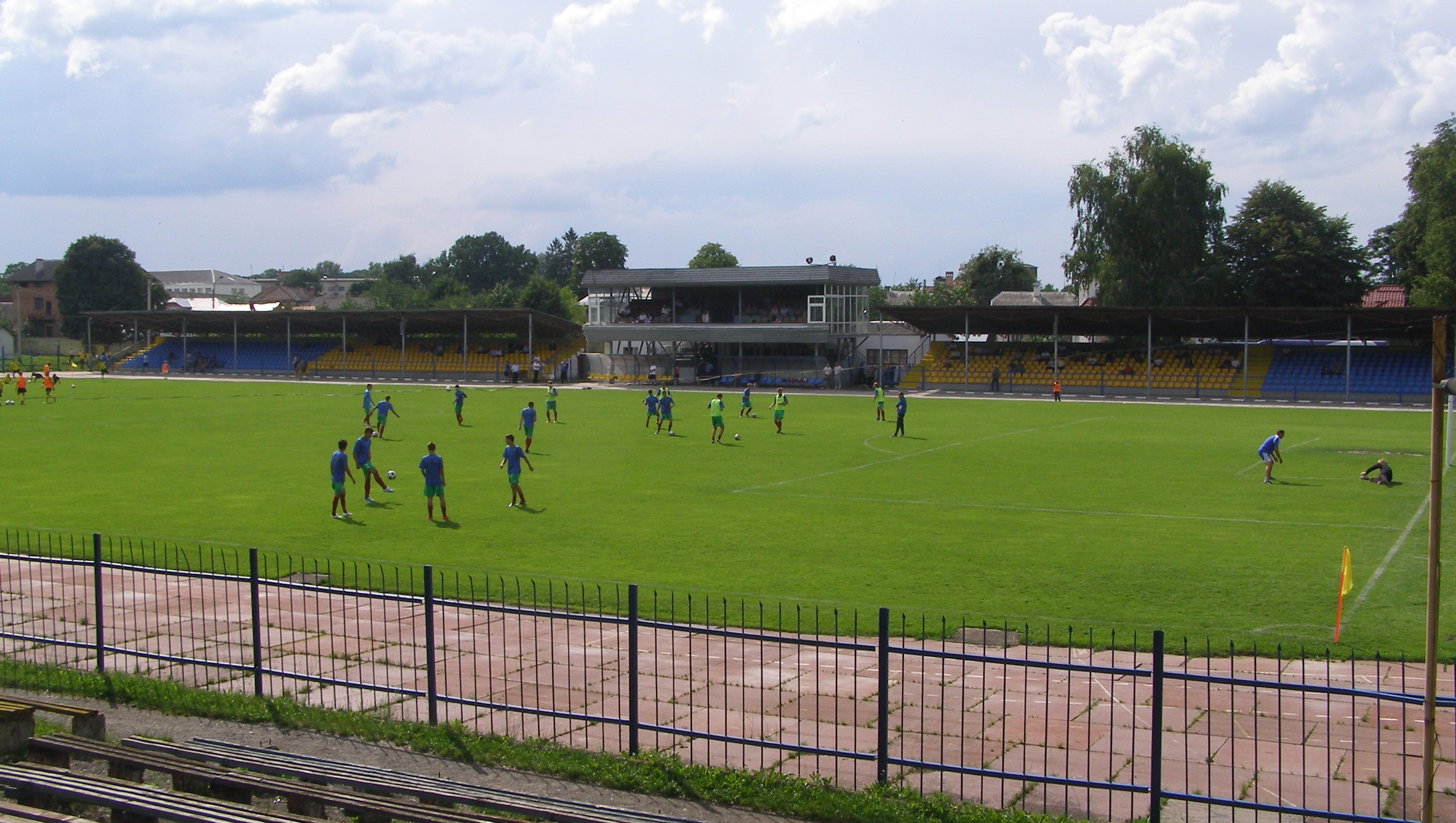
- Manager: Stepan Matviyiv (until February 2024); Roman Hnativ (from February 2024 until now)
- Stadium: Sokil Stadium
- Ukrainian Second League: Ukrainian Second League, 3rd in Group A
- Ukrainian Cup: Round of 64 (1/32)
- Top goalscorer: Yaroslav Kravchenko (5)
- Biggest win: Skala Stryi 7-0 Real Pharma Odesa
- Biggest defeat: Skala Stryi 0-3 Rukh-2 Lviv
Home colours	Away colours

During the 2024–25 season, FC Skala Stryi (1911) competed in the Ukrainian Second League of Ukrainian men's football. The club used the Sokil Stadium.

== Season summary ==
In September 2024, Stepan Matviyiv was appointed as coach replacing Mykhaylo Basarab. The club confirmed some key players such as Oleksandr Rudenko, Ivan Pastukh and Ilya Kozubenko moved on loan from Veres Rivne. In February 2025, Roman Hnativ was appointed as new coach replacing Stepan Matviyiv. On 3 August 2024 the club won in Ukrainian Cup against Epitsentr to reach the second round where on 12 August they were eliminated by Mynai 1-3. In Ukrainian Second League, the team finished the championship in 3rd place in group A. After Rukh-2 Lviv withdrew from the Ukrainian Second League, Skala Stryi was selected to play the Play-Offs against Chernihiv.

=== Third Place Play-Offs ===
On 26 May 2025, the club won the first match away against Lokomotyv Kyiv at the Kolos Stadium for 1-4. On 30 May 2025, in the second match, the club lost the first leg at home against Chernihiv at the Chernihiv Arena for 3-2. On 4 June 2025, the club lost also the second leg of the Play-Offs at the Sokil Stadium for 0-1.

== Players ==
=== Squad information ===
As of 10 October 2025

Squad no.	Name	Nationality	Position	Date of birth (age)
Goalkeepers
1	Danylo Veklych	(Ukraine)	GK	5 January 2002 (aged 22)
31	Kyrylo Arkhypchuk	(Ukraine)	GK	13 August 2003 (aged 20)
99	Denys Zavhorodniy	(Ukraine)	GK	15 January 1991 (aged 33)
Defenders
2	Oleksandr Rudenko	(Ukraine)	DF	24 October 1998 (aged 25)
3	Bogdan Sagaydak	(Ukraine)	DF	4 November 2004 (aged 19)
4	Artur Yanata	(Ukraine)	DF	31 October 1995 (aged 28)
5	Ilya Kozubenko	(Ukraine)	DF	22 April 2004 (aged 20)
13	Vadym Hudzinskyi	(Ukraine)	DF	2 July 2001 (aged 23)
18	Denys Harkavenko	(Ukraine)	DF	11 March 2004 (aged 20)
19	Roman Tsen	(Ukraine)	DF	2 December 1997 (aged 26)
20	Roman Nykolyshyn	(Ukraine)	DF	5 September 1997 (aged 26)
22	Danylo Yanyuk	(Ukraine)	DF	22 May 2003 (aged 21)
44	Ivan Pastukh	(Ukraine)	DF	18 March 1998 (aged 26)
98	Andriy Fesenko	(Ukraine)	DF	2 May 2004 (aged 20)
Midfielders
6	Andriy Ralyuchenko	(Ukraine)	MF	8 June 1995 (aged 29)
7	Volodymyr Lukyanchenko	(Ukraine)	MF	4 June 2002 (aged 22)
10	Maksym Averyanov	(Ukraine)	MF	22 July 1997 (aged 26)
11	Andriy Ralyuchenko	(Ukraine)	MF	8 June 1995 (aged 29)
14	Nazar Hrytsak	(Ukraine)	MF	10 March 1999 (aged 25)
15	Maksym Matsievskyi	(Ukraine)	MF	29 September 2004 (aged 19)
17	Andriy Petryk	(Ukraine)	MF	17 July 2002 (aged 22)
26	Illya Tsurkan	(Ukraine)	MF	17 April 2002 (aged 22)
30	Ivan Tkachyk	(Ukraine)	MF	18 January 2004 (aged 20)
98	Andriy Fesenko	(Ukraine)	MF	6 February 1998 (aged 26)
Forwards
7	Volodymyr Lukyanchenko	(Ukraine)	FW	5 June 2002 (aged 22)
8	Roman Lisovyk	(Ukraine)	FW	26 December 2001 (aged 22)
9	Vadym Merdyeyev	(Ukraine)	FW	13 August 2002 (aged 21)
21	Ivan Zhumiga	(Ukraine)	FW	7 June 2004 (aged 20)
10	Bogdan Gora	(Ukraine)	FW	13 November 2002 (aged 21)
77	Artur Fedor	(Ukraine)	FW	19 January 2004 (aged 20)
95	Yaroslav Kravchenko	(Ukraine)	FW	22 May 2003 (aged 21)

== Management team ==
Position	Name	Year appointed	Last club/team
Manager	(Ukraine) Roman Hnativ	2024-	Karpaty-2 Lviv
Manager	(Ukraine) Stepan Matviyiv	2024	Chornomorets Odesa (assistant)
Assistant Coach	(Ukraine) Mykhaylo Stelmakh	2024-2025	Dinaz Vyshhorod

== Transfers ==
=== In ===
Date	Pos.	Player	Age	Moving from	Type	Fee	Source
Summer
30 June 2024	MF	(Ukraine) Yaroslav Kravchenko	20	(Ukraine) Trostianets	Transfer	Free	
30 June 2024	MF	(Ukraine) Andriy Fesenko	20	(Ukraine) Livyi Bereh Kyiv	Transfer	Free	
1 July 2024	MF	(Ukraine) Danylo Yanyuk	25	Unattached	Transfer	Free	
26 July 2024	GK	(Ukraine) Kyrylo Arkhypchuk	20	(Ukraine) Trostianets	Transfer	Free	
29 July 2024	MF	(Ukraine) Ivan Tkachyk	20	(Ukraine) FC Ternopil	Transfer	Free	
29 July 2024	MF	(Ukraine) Ruslan Malskyi	20	(Ukraine) FC Ternopil	Transfer	Free	
29 July 2024	MF	(Ukraine) Ivan Zhumiga	20	(Ukraine) FC Ternopil	Transfer	Free	
29 July 2024	MF	(Ukraine) Artur Fedor	20	(Ukraine) Rukh-2 Lviv	Transfer	Free	
29 July 2024	MF	(Ukraine) Bogdan Sagaydak	20	(Ukraine) FC Ternopil	Transfer	Free	
29 July 2024	MF	(Ukraine) Maksym Matsievskyi	20	(Ukraine) FC Ternopil	Transfer	Free	
16 August 2025	MF	(Ukraine) Denys Harkavenko	20	(Ukraine) OleksandriyaU-19	Transfer	Free	
6 September 2024	MF	(Ukraine) Danylo Veklych	21	(Ukraine) Horishni Plavni	Transfer	Free	
8 September 2024	MF	(Ukraine) Ilya Kozubenko	20	(Ukraine) Veres Rivne	Transfer	Loan	
13 September 2024	MF	(Ukraine) Nazar Hrytsak	25	Unattached	Transfer	Free	
Winter
26 February 2025	MF	(Ukraine) Vadym Hudzinskyi	24	Unattached	Transfer	Free	
13 March 2025	FW	(Ukraine) Danylo Yanyuk	22	Unattached	Transfer	Free	

=== Out ===
Date	Pos.	Player	Age	Moving from	Type	Fee	Source
Summer
30 June 2024	GK	(Ukraine) Vladyslav Savchenko	20	(Ukraine) Mynai	Loan return	Free	
1 July 2024	FW	(Ukraine) Taras Puchkovskyi	30	(Ukraine) Ahrobiznes Volochysk	Transfer	Free	
1 July 2024	MF	(Ukraine) Mykyta Fomin	24	(Ukraine) Ahrobiznes Volochysk	Transfer	Free	
5 July 2024	MF	(Ukraine) Sergiy Lebedev	21	(Ukraine) Oleksandriya-2	Transfer	Free	
17 July 2024	MF	(Ukraine) Bogdan Ivanchenko	28	(Ukraine) Kulykiv-Bilka	Transfer	Free	
30 July 2024	MF	(Ukraine) Andriy Lebedenko	21	(Ukraine) Kulykiv-Bilka	Transfer	Free	
31 July 2024	MF	(Ukraine) Valentyn Napuda	19	(Ukraine) Nyva Ternopil	Transfer	Free	
8 August 2024	GK	(Ukraine) Kostyantyn Solobchuk	24	(Poland) Polonia Nysa	Transfer	Free	
12 August 2024	MF	(Ukraine) Oleksandr Chepelyuk	28	(Ukraine) Trostianets	Transfer	Free	
15 August 2024	MF	(Ukraine) Yuriy Flyak	30	Unattached	Released	Free	
16 August 2024	FW	(Ukraine) Yevgeniy Mazur	20	Unattached	Released	Free	
6 September 2024	DF	(Ukraine) Artur Yanata	29	Unattached	Released	Free	
6 September 2024	DF	(Ukraine) Roman Tsen	26	Unattached	Released	Free	
Winter
1 January 2025	MF	(Ukraine) Maksym Averyanov	27	(Ukraine) Karbon Cherkasy	Transfer	Free	
1 February 2025	MF	(Ukraine) Ivan Pastukh	26	Unattached	Released	Free	
1 February 2025	DF	(Ukraine) Andriy Petryk	22	Unattached	Released	Free	
11 March 2025	DF	(Ukraine) Illya Tsurkan	20	Unattached	Released	Free	
31 March 2025	FW	(Ukraine) Illya Tsurkan	22	(Ukraine) Karbon Cherkasy	Transfer	Free	

== Pre-season and friendlies ==
Win Draw Loss

4 March 2025 Friendly	Bukovyna Chernivtsi (Ukraine)	2–4	(Ukraine) FC Skala 1911 Stryi	Uzhhorod
EET (UTC+02:00)	Riznyk 41'	Report	Novikov 3'

== Competitions ==
=== Overall record ===
Competition	First match	Last match	Starting round	Final position	Record							
Competition	First match	Last match	Starting round	Final position	Pld	W	D	L	GF	GA	GD	Win %
Second League	9 August 2024	17 May 2025	Matchday 1	3rd	18	10	3	5	29	19	+10	55.56
Ukrainian Cup	3 August 2024	12 August 2024	Round of 64	Round of 32	2	1	0	1	3	3	+0	50.00
Second League Third Place Play-offs	26 May 2025	4 June 2025			3	1	0	2	6	5	+1	33.33
Total					23	12	3	8	38	27	+11	52.17

Source: Results

=== Ukrainian Second League ===
==== League table ====
Pos	Team	Pld	W	D	L	GF	GA	GD	Pts	Promotion, qualification or relegation
1	Probiy Horodenka	18	13	2	3	42	15	+27	41	Qualification to the league's title play-off
2	Rukh-2 Lviv	18	10	3	5	29	19	+10	33 (Note: Head-to-head goal difference: Rukh-2 +2, Skala 1911 -2)	Withdrawn after the season
3	Skala 1911 Stryi	18	10	3	5	31	18	+13	33	Qualification to the third place play-off
4	Kulykiv-Bilka	18	9	4	5	27	17	+10	31	
5	Polissya-2 Zhytomyr	18	9	2	7	33	21	+12	29	
6	Uzhhorod	18	7	5	6	26	25	+1	26	
7	Vilkhivtsi	18	5	4	9	20	29	−9	19	
8	Sambir-Nyva-2 Ternopil	18	5	3	10	15	30	−15	18	
9	Revera 1908 Ivano-Frankivsk	18	3	5	10	15	33	−18	14	Withdrawn after the season
10	Real Pharma Odesa	18	2	3	13	9	40	−31	9	

Source: PFL.ua
Rules for classification: 1) Points; 2) Head-to-head points; 3) Head-to-head goal difference; 4) Head-to-head goals scored; 5) Goal difference in all games; 6) Goals scored in all games (Note: calculation by criteria indicated in rules 2, 3, 4 is conducted with consideration of all teams that have equal number of tournament points at the moment of calculation and not only among those which after preliminary criteria have appeared more successful).
Notes:

Pos	Team	Pld	W	D	L	GF	GA	GD	Pts	Promotion, qualification or relegation
1	Kolos-2 Kovalivka	18	12	3	3	30	14	+16	39	Qualification to the league's title play-off
2	Chernihiv	18	11	5	2	30	8	+22	38	Qualification to the third place play-off
3	Lokomotyv Kyiv	18	9	3	6	22	21	+1	30	Qualification to the third place play-off
4	Oleksandriya-2	18	7	7	4	30	19	+11	28	
5	Hirnyk-Sport Horishni Plavni	18	8	2	8	19	20	−1	26	
6	Trostianets	18	5	7	6	20	16	+4	22	
7	Chaika Petropavlivska Borshchahivka	18	4	7	7	15	21	−6	19	
8	Metalist 1925-2 Kharkiv	18	5	3	10	23	39	−16	18	Withdrawn after the season
9	Nyva Vinnytsia	18	5	1	12	14	26	−12	16	
10	Vorskla-2 Poltava	18	3	4	11	15	34	−19	13	Withdrawn after the season

Source: PFL.ua
Rules for classification: 1) Points; 2) Head-to-head points; 3) Head-to-head goal difference; 4) Head-to-head goals scored; 5) Goal difference in all games; 6) Goals scored in all games (Note: calculation by criteria indicated in rules 2, 3, 4 is conducted with consideration of all teams that have equal number of tournament points at the moment of calculation and not only among those which after preliminary criteria have appeared more successful).

The winner of the league's title play-off gains direct promotion to the 2025–26 Ukrainian First League. The finalists of the league's title play-off and the winner of the third-place play-off gain qualification to the promotional play-offs. On 30 April 2025, a draw was held for the Second League playoffs, including for the title and the third place. The first leg is expected to take place on 23 May, while the second leg is on 30 May. On 21 May 2025, the PFL Central Council decided that the play-off match-up between Chernihiv and Rukh-2 will not take place since Rukh-2 Lviv withdrew. Also, the council reviewed propositions to provide an extra chance to Skala 1911 Stryi, but they were less popular. On 22 May 2025, the Ukrainian Association of Football Executive Committee published its decision about the situation by making changes and allowing third-placed teams from both groups to play each other to determine the opponent for FC Chernihiv.

League's final

League's title
B1	Kolos-2 Kovalivka	0	3	3
A1	Probiy Horodenka (p)	1	2	3

Team 1	Agg.	Team 2	1st leg	2nd leg
Kolos-2 Kovalivka	3 – 3 (3 – 4 p)	Probiy Horodenka	0–1	3–2

23 May 2025	Kolos-2 Kovalivka	0–1	Probiy Horodenka	Kovalivka, Kyiv Oblast
14:00		Report	Kharuk 39'	Stadium: Kolos; Attendance: 228; Referee: Artem Artemenko

30 May 2025	Probiy Horodenka	2–3 (a.e.t.) (4–3 p)	Kolos-2 Kovalivka	Horodenka, Ivano-Frankivsk Oblast
13:30	Felipovych 37'; Orynchak 65'	Report	Holovkin 73'; Kolesnyk 82'; Shevchuk 90+1'	Stadium: Probiy Arena; Referee: Stepan Lapko
	Penalties
	Bilyi (penalty missed); Felipovych (penalty scored); Sondey (penalty scored); Radulskyi (penalty scored); Orynchak (penalty scored)		(penalty scored) Holovkin; (penalty scored) Pomazan; (penalty scored) Kolesnyk; (penalty missed) Kanayev; (penalty missed) Nedolya

3–3 on aggregate; Probiy Horodenka won 4–3 on penalties.

Third place

For two-legged ties, the team listed above in the bracket hosted the first match. The third score is the match aggregate.

- Extra play-off
- single match

- Third-place final
- two-legged tie

B2
FC Chernihiv
3
1
4

B3
Lokomotyv Kyiv
—
—
1

A3
Skala 1911 Stryi
2
0
2

A3
Skala 1911 Stryi
—
—
4

Team 1	Score	Team 2
Lokomotyv Kyiv	1–4	Skala 1911 Stryi

26 May 2025	Lokomotyv Kyiv	1–4	Skala 1911 Stryi	Boryspil, Kyiv Oblast
13:00	Romanchuk 51'	Report	Sahaidak 7'; Lisovyk 12'; Hora 26'; Kravchenko 76'	Stadium: Kolos; Attendance: 0 Referee: Dmytro Osaulenko

Team 1	Agg.	Team 2	1st leg	2nd leg
Chernihiv	4–2	Skala 1911 Stryi	3–2	0–1

30 May 2025	FC Chernihiv	3–2	Skala 1911 Stryi	Chernihiv
	Porokhnya 21'; Koydan 30'; Kulyk 90+5'	Report	Lisovyk 56', 82'	Stadium: Chernihiv Arena; Attendance: 180; Referee: Anatoliy Ukhov

4 June 2025	Skala 1911 Stryi	0–1	FC Chernihiv	Stryi, Lviv Oblast
		Report	Novikov 8'	Stadium: Sokil

FC Chernihiv won 4–2 on aggregate.

=== Third place play-offs ===
26 May 2025 1 (Third place)	Lokomotyv Kyiv	1-4	Skala 1911 Stryi	Boryspil
EEST (UTC+3)	Romanchuk 51'	Report	Sahaidak 7'; Lisovyk 12'; Hora 26'; Kravchenko 76'	Stadium: Kolos Stadium; Attendance: 0 Referee: Dmytro Osaulenko

30 May 2025 2 (Third place)	Chernihiv	3-2	Skala 1911 Stryi	Chernihiv
EEST (UTC+3)	Porokhnya 21'; Koydan 30'; Romanchenko (yellow card) 37'; Shumylo (yellow card) 66'; Kulyk 90+5'	Report	Kravchenko (yellow card) 23'; Lisovyk 56'; Lisovyk 82'	Stadium: Chernihiv Arena; Attendance: 180; Referee: Anatoly Ukhov

4 June 2025 3 (Third place)	Skala 1911 Stryi	0-1	Chernihiv	Stryi
EEST (UTC+3)	Matsievskyi (yellow card) 29'; Lukyanchenko (yellow card) 63'; Yanyuk (yellow card) 66'	Report	Novikov 8'; Fatyeyev (yellow card) 29'; Serdyuk (yellow card) 52'; Koydan (yellow card) 57'; Porokhnya (yellow card) 68'; Tatarenko (yellow card) 79'	Stadium: Sokil Stadium; Referee: Andriy Zaytsev

=== Ukrainian Cup ===
3 August 2024 Round of 64 (1/32)	FC Skala Stryi	2-0	Epitsentr	Morshyn, Lviv Oblast
EEST (UTC+3)	Averyanov 11'; Yanata 36'	Report		Stadium: Medyk; Referee: I.Mandzyuk (Ternopil Oblast)

12 August 2024 Round of 64 (1/32)	FC Skala Stryi	1-3	Mynai	Morshyn, Lviv Oblast
EEST (UTC+3)	Dmytruk 41' (o.g.)	Report	Prokopchuk 12'; Hunichev 48', 73'	Stadium: Medyk; Referee: I.Salash (Kalush)

== Statistics ==
=== Appearances and goals ===
No.	Pos	Nat	Player	Total		Ukrainian Second League		Cup		Play-offs	
No.	Pos	Nat	Player	Apps	Goals	Apps	Goals	Apps	Goals	Apps	Goals
Goalkeepers
1	GK	(Ukraine) UKR	Danylo Veklych	0	0	0	0	0	0	0	0
31	GK	(Ukraine) UKR	Kyrylo Arkhypchuk	21	0	16	0	2	0	3	0
99	GK	(Ukraine) UKR	Denys Zavhorodniy	3	0	3	0	0	0	0	0
Defenders
2	DF	(Ukraine) UKR	Oleksandr Rudenko	12	1	10	1	2	0	0	0
3	DF	(Ukraine) UKR	Bogdan Sagaydak	12	1	8	0	1	0	3	1
5	DF	(Ukraine) UKR	Ilya Kozubenko	5	0	5	0	0	0	0	0
13	DF	(Ukraine) UKR	Ivan Pastukh	9	0	6	0	0	0	3	0
18	DF	(Ukraine) UKR	Denys Harkavenko	23	1	18	1	2	0	3	0
20	DF	(Ukraine) UKR	Roman Nykolyshyn	23	1	18	1	2	0	3	0
22	DF	(Ukraine) UKR	Danylo Yanyuk	20	1	16	1	1	0	3	0
98	DF	(Ukraine) UKR	Andriy Fesenko	22	5	18	5	1	0	3	0
Midfielders
6	MF	(Ukraine) UKR	Andriy Ralyuchenko	22	3	18	3	1	0	3	0
7	MF	(Ukraine) UKR	Volodymyr Lukyanchenko	21	3	16	3	2	0	3	0
10	MF	(Ukraine) UKR	Maksym Averyanov	13	1	11	0	2	1	0	0
11	MF	(Ukraine) UKR	Ruslan Malskyi	10	0	9	0	0	0	1	0
14	MF	(Ukraine) UKR	Nazar Hrytsak	7	3	6	3	1	0	0	0
15	DF	(Ukraine) UKR	Maksym Matsievskyi	16	1	11	1	2	0	3	0
26	MF	(Ukraine) UKR	Illya Tsurkan	20	1	18	1	2	0	0	0
98	MF	(Ukraine) UKR	Andriy Fesenko	22	5	18	5	1	0	3	0
Forwards
7	FW	(Ukraine) UKR	Volodymyr Lukyanchenko	21	3	16	3	2	0	3	0
8	FW	(Ukraine) UKR	Roman Lisovyk	19	6	15	3	1	0	3	3
9	FW	(Ukraine) UKR	Vadym Merdyeyev	17	0	13	0	2	0	2	0
10	FW	(Ukraine) UKR	Bogdan Gora	9	2	6	1	0	0	3	1
21	FW	(Ukraine) UKR	Ivan Zhumiga	18	3	15	3	0	0	3	0
77	FW	(Ukraine) UKR	Artur Fedor	12	0	9	0	1	0	2	0
95	FW	(Ukraine) UKR	Yaroslav Kravchenko	17	6	12	5	2	0	3	1
Players transferred out during the season
4	DF	(Ukraine) UKR	Artur Yanata	12	1	10	0	2	1	0	0
17	MF	(Ukraine) UKR	Andriy Petryk	10	1	9	1	1	0	0	0
19	DF	(Ukraine) UKR	Roman Tsen	6	0	4	0	2	0	0	0
30	MF	(Ukraine) UKR	Ivan Tkachyk	10	0	9	0	1	0	0	0
44	DF	(Ukraine) UKR	Ivan Pastukh	12	0	10	0	2	0	0	0

Source: Competitions

Last updated: 5 October 2025

=== Goalscorers ===
Rank	No.	Pos	Nat	Name	Second League	Cup	Play-offs	Total
1	8	FW	(Ukraine)	Roman Lisovyk	3	0	3	6
2	95	FW	(Ukraine)	Yaroslav Kravchenko	5	0	1	6
3	98	MF	(Ukraine)	Andriy Fesenko	5	0	0	5
4	21	FW	(Ukraine)	Ivan Zhumiga	3	0	0	3
5	7	MF	(Ukraine)	Volodymyr Lukyanchenko	3	0	0	3
6	14	MF	(Ukraine)	Nazar Hrytsak	3	0	0	3
7	6	MF	(Ukraine)	Andriy Ralyuchenko	3	0	0	3
8	10	FW	(Ukraine)	Bogdan Gora	1	0	1	2
9	34	DF	(Ukraine)	Oleksandr Rudenko	1	0	0	1
10	20	DF	(Ukraine)	Roman Nykolyshyn	1	0	0	1
11	20	DF	(Ukraine)	Denys Harkavenko	1	0	0	1
12	26	MF	(Ukraine)	Illya Tsurkan	1	0	0	1
13	15	MF	(Ukraine)	Maksym Matsievskyi	1	0	0	1
14	3	DF	(Ukraine)	Bogdan Sagaydak	0	0	1	1
15	3	MF	(Ukraine)	Maksym Averyanov	0	1	0	1
				Total Trequartista	0	0	0	0

Last updated: 5 October 2025

=== Clean sheets ===
Rank	No.	Pos	Nat	Name	Second League	Cup	Play-offs	Total
1	35	GK	(Ukraine)	Kyrylo Arkhypchuk	7	1	0	8
				Total	7	1	0	8

Last updated: 5 October 2025
