= 2024 PFL open tournament =

Ukrainian Football season

PFL open tournament
- Season: 2024–25
- Dates: 2 November 2024 – 2 December 2024
- Winner: Skala 1911 Stryi
- Top goalscorer: Danylo Kolesnyk (Kolos-2 Kovalivka); 6 goals

The 2024 PFL open tournament was a friendly competition which was introduced by the Professional Football League of Ukraine in the 2024–25 season. It was the third of a kind competition to which teams were invited on voluntary basis for extra playtime. The last time similar tournament was carried out in the spring of 2023.

On 28 October 2024 with finishing of the Round 12 in the Second League, the third-tier competitions took a winter break until the mid of April of 2025. Next day on 29 October 2024, the PFL administration announced that it would conduct a short tournament in November from 2nd to 30th of November. The tournament was initiated by the Second League clubs. Beside 8 clubs that volunteered to participate, they were also joined by an amateur side from Cherkasy (see Teams section). About a week later on 9 November 2024, the competition was joined by one more team bringing the total number of participants to 10.

The tournament had a group stage and a small play-off stage. The 9 teams were split in two groups by geographic principle where they competed in single round-robin tournament. The winner of each group contested the tournament title, while runners up determined the third-place winner. Each team played three, four, or five matches.

== Teams ==
=== Location map ===
The following displays the location of teams.

Location of teams in the 2024 PFL open tournament
— Group A — Group B

=== Stadiums ===
Group A

| Team | Pop. place | Stadium | Tier |
|---|---|---|---|
| Skala 1911 | Stryi, Lviv Oblast | Sokil | III |
| Revera 1908 | Ivano-Frankivsk | Urahan Sports Complex | III |
| Kulykiv-Bilka | Kulykiv, Lviv Oblast | Arena Kulykiv | III |
| Vilkhivtsi | Vilkhivtsi, Zakarpattia Oblast | Arena-Park | III |
| Sambir-Nyva-2 | Sambir, Lviv Oblast | imeni Brovarskoho | III |

Group B

| Team | Pop. place | Stadium | Tier |
|---|---|---|---|
| Karbon | Heronymivka, Cherkasy Oblast | LNZ training field | AM |
| Kolos-2 | Bucha, Kyiv Oblast | Yuvileinyi | III |
| Metalist 1925-2 (Note: Metalist 1925-2 joined the competition a week later on 9 November 2024.) | Boryspil, Kyiv Oblast | Kolos | III |
| Vorskla-2 | Poltava | Ltava | III |
| Oleksandriya-2 | Oleksandriya, Kirovohrad Oblast | Olimp | III |

== Group A ==
=== Group A league table ===
| Pos | Team | Pld | W | D | L | GF | GA | GD | Pts | Promotion, qualification or relegation | SKL | KUL | NV2 | REV | VLX |
|---|---|---|---|---|---|---|---|---|---|---|---|---|---|---|---|
| 1 | Skala 1911 Stryi (Q) | 4 | 3 | 1 | 0 | 11 | 2 | +9 | 10 | Qualification to the title play-off | | 4–0 | | | 5–2 |
| 2 | Kulykiv-Bilka (Q) | 4 | 2 | 1 | 1 | 7 | 8 | −1 | 7 | Qualification to the third place play-off | | | 2–2 | 3–1 | |
| 3 | Sambir-Nyva-2 Ternopil | 4 | 1 | 1 | 2 | 5 | 8 | −3 | 4 (Note: Head-to-head points: Sambir-Nyva-2 3; Revera 1908 0) | | 0–2 | | | 3–2 | |
| 4 | Revera 1908 Ivano-Frankivsk | 4 | 1 | 1 | 2 | 4 | 6 | −2 | 4 | | 0–0 | | | | 1–0 |
| 5 | Vilkhivtsi | 4 | 1 | 0 | 3 | 5 | 8 | −3 | 3 | | | 1–2 | 2–0 | | |

Source: pfl.ua
Rules for classification: 1) Points; 2) Wins; 3) Better goal difference; 4) Most goals scored; 5) If any two or more teams has same number of points advantage receive that team that in games with all its opponents that earned same number of points for tiebreak are applied following criteria – 5.1) Points; 5.2) Wins; 5.3) Better goal difference; 5.4) Most goals scored; 6) In event if all criteria for rule 5 are equal, placing for teams is determined according to general criteria for all teams 1, 2, 3, 4; 7) Draw of lots.
(Q) Qualified for the phase indicated
Notes:

== Group B ==
=== Group B league table ===
| Pos | Team | Pld | W | D | L | GF | GA | GD | Pts | Promotion, qualification or relegation | OL2 | KK2 | VP2 | MX2 | KRB |
|---|---|---|---|---|---|---|---|---|---|---|---|---|---|---|---|
| 1 | Oleksandriya-2 (Q) | 4 | 4 | 0 | 0 | 13 | 4 | +9 | 12 | Qualification to the title play-off | | | 5–1 | 3–2 | |
| 2 | Kolos-2 Kovalivka (Q) | 4 | 2 | 1 | 1 | 5 | 3 | +2 | 7 | Qualification to the third place play-off | 0–2 | | | | 3–0 (Note: The match took place at an indoor facility Knyazha Arena in Shchaslyve on 24 November 2024. It ended after 65 minutes of playtime due to loss of power (possibly air siren). The final result was 1:0. Later it became known that result was changed to the technical victor for Kolos-2.) |
| 3 | Vorskla-2 Poltava | 4 | 2 | 1 | 1 | 7 | 7 | 0 | 7 | | | 1–1 | | 2–0 | 2–0 |
| 4 | Metalist 1925-2 Kharkiv | 4 | 1 | 0 | 3 | 8 | 11 | −3 | 3 | | | 0–1 | | | |
| 5 | Karbon Cherkasy | 4 | 0 | 0 | 4 | 5 | 13 | −8 | 0 | | 1–3 | | | 4–5 | |

Source: pfl.ua
Rules for classification: 1) Points; 2) Wins; 3) Better goal difference; 4) Most goals scored; 5) If any two or more teams has same number of points advantage receive that team that in games with all its opponents that earned same number of points for tiebreak are applied following criteria – 5.1) Points; 5.2) Wins; 5.3) Better goal difference; 5.4) Most goals scored; 6) In event if all criteria for rule 5 are equal, placing for teams is determined according to general criteria for all teams 1, 2, 3, 4; 7) Draw of lots.
(Q) Qualified for the phase indicated
Notes:

== Play-offs ==
The winner of each group contested the title, while there also was the third place match; both matches were played at the stadium Livyi Bereh.

League's title (2 December)
A1 | Skala 1911 Stryi | 3
B1 | Oleksandriya-2 | 1
Third place (30 November)
A2 | Kulykiv-Bilka | 2
B2 | Kolos-2 Kovalivka | 3

=== Final details ===
2024-12-02
12:00 LST

| Skala 1911 Stryi | 3–1 | FC Oleksandriya-2 |
|---|---|---|
| Fedor 65'; Fesenko 78'; Zhumiha 90+3' | (Report) | Bazayev 72' |

Livyi Bereh (indoor), Zolocha community
Referee: Arten Hordynskyi (Vinnytsia)

Skala 1911 Stryi:
| GK | 31 | Kyrylo Arkhypchuk |
| DF | 9 | Vadym Merdyeyev | (yellow card) 45' |
| DF | 20 | Roman Nykolyshyn |
| DF | 18 | Denys Harkavenko |
| DF | 26 | Ivan Tkachyk | (substituted off) 83' |
| MF | 6 | Andriy Ralyuchenko (c) |
| MF | 98 | Andriy Fesenko | (yellow card) 88' |
| MF | 11 | Ruslan Malskyi | (substituted off) 85' |
| MF | 15 | Maksym Matsiyevskyi | (substituted off) 62' |
| FW | 14 | Nazar Hrytsak | (yellow card) 61' | (substituted off) 62' |
| FW | 77 | Artur Fedor | (substituted off) 80' |
Substitutes:
| GK | 1 | Danylo Veklych |
| DF | 2 | Oleksandr Rudenko | (substituted on) 83' |
| MF | 17 | Andriy Petryk | (substituted on) 85' |
| MF | 8 | Roman Lisovyk | (substituted on) 62' |
| FW | 21 | Ivan Zhumiha | (substituted on) 62' |
| FW | 94 | Yaroslav Kravchenko | (substituted on) 80' |
| DF | 26 | Illya Tsurkan |
| DF | 5 | Illya Kozubenko |
| MF | 99 | Denys Zavhorodniy |
Manager:
Roman Hnativ (acting)

Oleksandriya-2:
| GK | 1 | Viktor Dolhyi |
| DF | 24 | Danylo Romanenko |
| DF | 5 | Danylo Harazha |
| DF | 4 | Yuriy Matviiv |
| DF | 53 | Dmytro Hrazhdan | (substituted off) 75' |
| MF | 73 | Nazar Prokopenko | (substituted off) 75' |
| MF | 20 | Simon Haloyan | (yellow card) 33' |
| MF | 14 | Maksym Radchenko (c) | (yellow card) 90+1' |
| MF | 15 | (Brazil) Mateus Amaral | (substituted off) 66' |
| FW | 17 | Yaroslav Bazayev |
| FW | 25 | Oleksandr Zhadan | (substituted off) 66' |
Substitutes:
| GK | 31 | Yehor Taran |
| DF | 7 | Myron Hrebenyuk | (substituted on) 75' |
| MF | 11 | Nazar Kayda | (substituted on) 75' |
| MF | 8 | Serhiy Lebedyev | (substituted on) 66' |
| FW | 23 | Artem Petryk | (substituted on) 66' |
| MF | 38 | Yevheniy Prokopenko |
| MF | 10 | Denys Kubenko |
| MF | 21 | Illya Ukhan |
| MF | 9 | Maksym Astafyev |
| MF | 18 | Dmytro Bezkleynyi |
Manager:
Viktor Bytsiura

== See also ==
- 2024–25 Ukrainian Second League
- 2024–25 Ukrainian First League
- 2024–25 Ukrainian Premier League
- 2024–25 Ukrainian Amateur Cup
- Ukrainian League Cup
