= Pavlo Kotovenko =

Ukrainian footballer and coach

Personal information
- Full name: Pavlo Ivanovych Kotovenko
- Date of birth: 25 March 1979 (age 47)
- Place of birth: Lviv, Ukrainian SSR
- Height: 1.81 m (5 ft 11 1/2 in)
- Position: Midfielder

Youth career
- LGUFK Lviv

Senior career*
Years	Team	Apps	(Gls)
1996–1998	Lviv	61	(4)
1999	Karpaty Lviv	0	(0)
1999–2000	Lviv	31	(2)
2000	Karpaty-2 Lviv	1	(0)
2000–2001	Lviv	17	(3)
2001–2004	Rotor Volgograd	34	(1)
2004	Lisma-Mordovia Saransk	10	(1)
2004–2006	Hazovyk-Skala Stryi	22	(3)
2006	Obolon Kyiv	5	(0)
2011–2012	FC Kulykiv	?	(?)
2012	FC Standart Artasiv	?	(?)
2013	FC Shakhtar Chervonohrad	?	(?)
2015–2018	SKK Demnia	?	(?)

Managerial career
- 2013: FC Shakhtar Chervonohrad
- 2015–2018: SKK Demnia
- 2018–2020: Volyn Lutsk (assistant)
- * Club domestic league appearances and goals

Pavlo Ivanovych Kotovenko (Ukrainian: Павло Іванович Котовенко; born 25 March 1979) is a Ukrainian retired football player and coach.
