= Mykhailo Vilkhovyi =

Ukrainian football manager (born 1958)

Personal information
- Full name: Mykhailo Mykhailovych Vilkhovyi
- Date of birth: 13 April 1958 (age 68)
- Place of birth: Ukrainian SSR, Soviet Union

Managerial career
- Years: Team
- 1988–1991: Karpaty Kamianka-Buzka
- 1992: Skala Stryi
- 1993–1994: FC Lviv
- 1994: Skala Stryi
- 1994–1995: Skify Lviv
- 1996: Hazovyk Komarno
- 2000–2002: Dynamo Lviv

Mykhailo Vilkhovyi (Ukrainian: Михайло Михайлович Вільховий; born 13 April 1958 in the Ukrainian SSR of the Soviet Union - in present-day Ukraine) is a Ukrainian football manager.

Positively about Vilkhovyi talked another Ukrainian coach from Kharkiv Valentyn Khodukin whom Vilkhovyi convinced to become a coach and became the first head coach of revived FC Skala Stryi at the end of 1991. According to Khodukin, Vilkhovyi along with Anatoliy Kroshchenko were involved in coaching of national football team.

In 1994, Vilkhovyi served as an assistant coach on the coaching staff of Anatoliy Konkov for the Ukraine U-18 team.
