= Oleksandr Aksyonov =

Ukrainian footballer (born 1994)

Personal information
- Full name: Oleksandr Oleksandrovych Aksyonov
- Date of birth: 7 January 1994 (age 32)
- Place of birth: Kramatorsk, Ukraine
- Height: 1.84 m (6 ft 0 in)
- Position: Centre-back

Youth career
- 2007–2011: Metalurh Donetsk

Senior career*
Years	Team	Apps	(Gls)
2011	Avanhard Kramatorsk	0	(0)
2012	Retro Vatutine	6	(0)
2012–2014	Tavriya Simferopol	12	(1)
2014	Illichivets Mariupol	3	(0)
2015	Shakhtar-3 Donetsk	11	(0)
2015–2016	Avanhard Kramatorsk	24	(0)
2016–2017	Arsenal Kyiv	10	(0)
2017	Mykolaiv	2	(0)
2017	→ Mykolaiv-2	14	(0)
2018	Hirnyk-Sport Horishni Plavni	20	(1)
2019	Avanhard Kramatorsk	1	(0)
2019	→ Avanhard-2 Kramatorsk	17	(0)
2020–2021	Banga Gargždai	33	(1)
2021	Uzhhorod	12	(0)
2022	Mynai	0	(0)
2022	Prykarpattia Ivano-Frankivsk	11	(0)
2023	Medeya Orikhovytsia	1	(0)
2023	Skala 1911 Stryi	2	(0)
- * Club domestic league appearances and goals as of 25 February 2024

Oleksandr Oleksandrovych Aksyonov (Ukrainian: Олександр Олександрович Аксьонов; born 7 January 1994) is a Ukrainian professional footballer who plays as a centre-back.

== Career ==
Aksyonov is a product of the FC Metalurh Donetsk Youth school system. He made his debut for SC Tavriya Simferopol playing as the substituted player in the game against FC Dnipro Dnipropetrovsk on 15 September 2013 in the Ukrainian Premier League.
