= Nazariy Bohomaz =

Ukrainian footballer (born 2000)

Personal information
- Full name: Nazariy Petrovych Bohomaz
- Date of birth: 12 January 2000 (age 26)
- Place of birth: Kotsyury, Volyn Oblast, Ukraine
- Height: 1.71 m (5 ft 7 in)
- Position: Centre-forward

Team information
- Current team: Vilkhivtsi
- Number: 47

Youth career
- 2013–2014: DYuSSh Lyuboml
- 2016: Shakhtar Chervonohrad
- 2017–2018: Volyn Lutsk

Senior career*
| Years | Team | Apps | (Gls) |
| 2016–2017 | Rubizh Lyuboml | 1 | (0) |
| 2017–2022 | Volyn Lutsk | 14 | (0) |
| 2020 | → Dnipro-1 (loan) | 0 | (0) |
| 2020–2021 | → Volyn-2 Lutsk | 8 | (6) |
| 2021 | → Hirnyk-Sport Horishni Plavni (loan) | 7 | (1) |
| 2022–2023 | Cosmos Nowotaniec | 26 | (13) |
| 2023–2024 | Skala Stryi | 7 | (0) |
| 2024 | Lokomotyv Kyiv | 9 | (2) |
| 2024–2025 | Uzhhorod | 17 | (3) |
| 2025–2026 | Ahrobiznes Volochysk | 6 | (0) |
| 2026– | Vilkhivtsi | 10 | (1) |
- * Club domestic league appearances and goals as of 6 June 2026

Nazariy Petrovych Bohomaz (Ukrainian: Назарій Петрович Богомаз; born 12 January 2000) is a Ukrainian professional footballer who plays as a centre-forward for Ukrainian Second League club Vilkhivtsi.

== Honours ==
Cosmos Nowotaniec

- IV liga Subcarpathia: 2022–23
- Polish Cup (Krosno regionals): 2022–23
