= Volodymyr Zhuravchak =

Ukrainian footballer (born 1957)

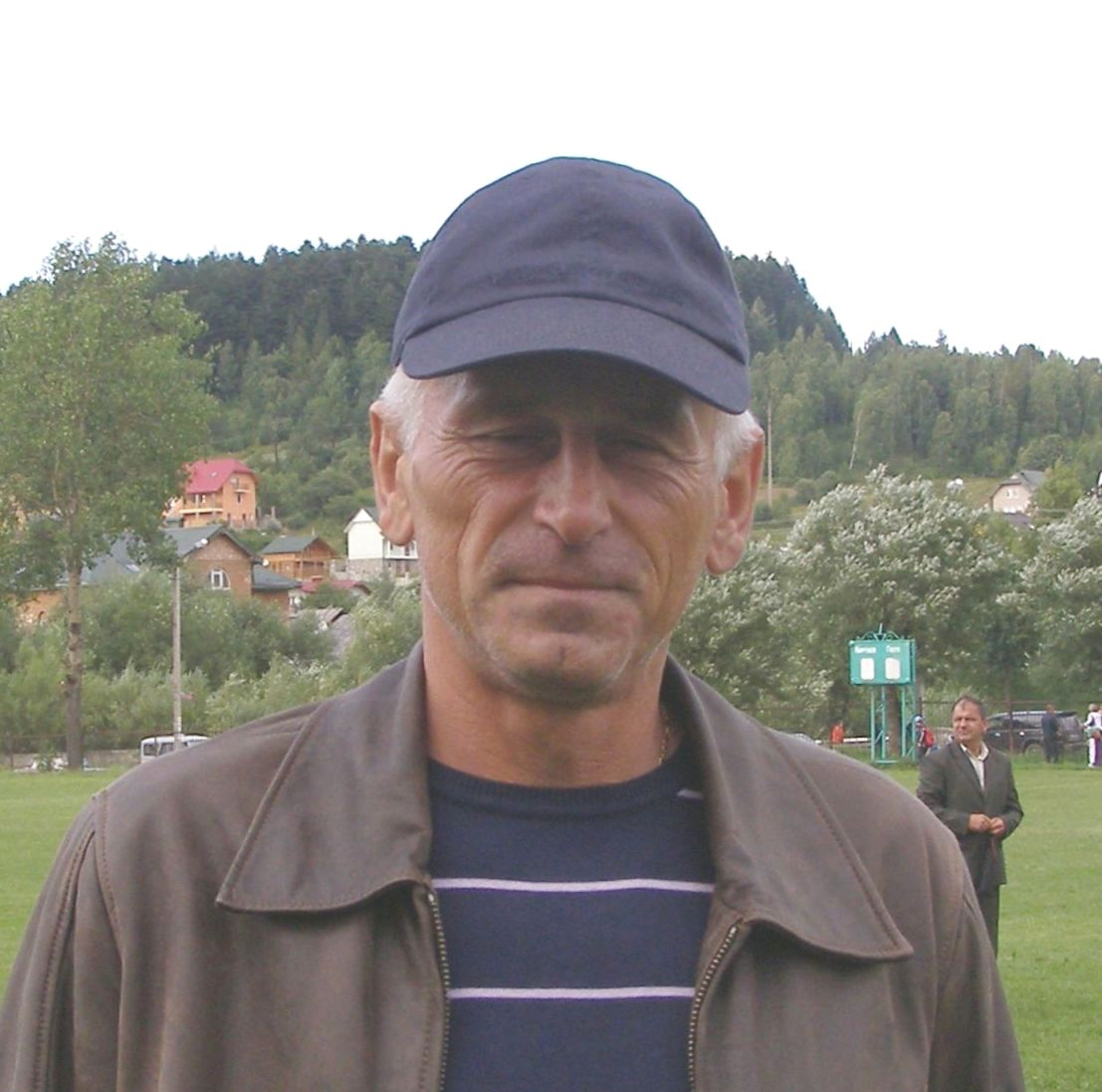

Personal information
- Full name: Volodymyr Oleksiyovych Zhuravchak
- Date of birth: 3 May 1957 (age 69)
- Place of birth: Skhidnytsia, Drohobych Oblast, USSR
- Height: 1.80 m (5 ft 11 in)
- Position: Defender

Senior career*
Years	Team	Apps	(Gls)
1977	Torpedo Lutsk	29	(0)
1978–1980	Metalist Kharkiv	118	(0)
1981–1983	Kuban Krasnodar	78	(0)
1984–1988	FC SKA Karpaty Lviv	79	(0)
1988	FC Avanhard Drohobych		
1989–1990	FC Karpaty Kamianka-Buzka (amateur)		
1991	FC Karpaty Kamianka-Buzka	3	(0)

International career
1982	USSR (Olimpic)	1	(0)

Managerial career
- 1991: FC Karpaty Kamianka-Buzka (playing coach)
- 1992: FC Hazovyk Komarno
- 1992–1995: Karpaty Lviv (assistant)
- 1995–1996: Karpaty Lviv
- 1996–1998: Karpaty Lviv (assistant)
- 1999–2001: Lviv
- 2001–2002: Karpaty Lviv (assistant)
- 2002: Karpaty Lviv
- 2002–2003: Karpaty Lviv (assistant)
- 2003–2004: Karpaty Lviv (assistant)
- 2005: FK Venta (assistant)
- 2006–2010: Volyn Lutsk (assistant)
- 2012: Lviv
- 2012–2013: Tavriya Simferopol (assistant)
- 2014–2016: Karpaty Lviv (staff)
- 2016–2018: Lviv (assistant)
- * Club domestic league appearances and goals

Volodymyr Zhuravchak (Ukrainian: Володимир Олексійович Журавчак; born 3 May 1957) is a Ukrainian football coach and a former player.

== Coaching career ==
The first team that he coached was FC Karpaty Kamianka-Buzka in 1991. He was also the head coach of Karpaty Lviv.

On 1 February 2012, he became the head coach of the FC Lviv in the Ukrainian First League.

In June 2012 he was appointed as assistant coach in Tavriya Simferopol in the Ukrainian Premier League.
