= Yuriy-Yosyp Shulyatytskyi =

Ukrainian football coach (1942–2013)

Yuriy Shuliatytskyi
Personal information
- Full name: Yuriy Yosypovych Shuliatytskyi
- Date of birth: 4 August 1942
- Place of birth: Stanislau, Distrikt Galizien, General Government
- Date of death: 21 February 2013 (aged 70)
- Place of death: Ivano-Frankivsk, Ukraine

Managerial career
- Years: Team
- 1992: FC Prykarpattya Ivano-Frankivsk
- 1998–1999: FC Volyn Lutsk
- 2002–2006: FC Chornohora Ivano-Frankivsk
- 2006–2007: FC Spartak Ivano-Frankivsk

Yuriy Shuliatytskyi (Ukrainian: Юрій Йосипович Шулятицький, Russian: Юрий Иосифович Шулятицкий; 4 August 1942 – 21 February 2013) was a Ukrainian football coach.

== Personal life ==
He is a brother of Taras Shulyatytskyi. His son Yuriy Shulyatytskyi was also a professional footballer.
