= Oleksandr Hlahola =

Ukrainian footballer

Personal information
- Full name: Oleksandr Oleksandrovych Hlahola
- Date of birth: 19 July 1997 (age 29)
- Place of birth: Svaliava, Ukraine
- Height: 1.68 m (5 ft 6 in)
- Position: Attacking midfielder

Team information
- Current team: Vilkhivtsi
- Number: 14

Youth career
- DYuSSh Svalyava
- 2010–2011: Skala Morshyn
- 2011–2012: Munkach Mukachevo
- 2012: Polyana
- 2012: Munkach Mukachevo
- 2012–2014: Shakhtar Donetsk

Senior career*
Years	Team	Apps	(Gls)
2014–2019	Shakhtar Donetsk	0	(0)
2019–2020	Mynai	18	(1)
2021–2022	Polissya Zhytomyr	18	(0)
2022	Uzhhorod	0	(0)
2022–2024	Bukovyna Chernivtsi	23	(0)
2024–	Vilkhivtsi	36	(8)
- * Club domestic league appearances and goals as of 6 June 2026

Oleksandr Oleksandrovych Hlahola (Ukrainian: Олександр Олександрович Глагола; born 19 July 1997) is a Ukrainian professional footballer who plays as an attacking midfielder for Vilkhivtsi.

== Career ==
In March 2023 he moved to Bukovyna Chernivtsi in Ukrainian First League.
