= Yuriy Shulyatytskyi =

Ukrainian footballer (born 1970)

Personal information
- Full name: Yuriy Yuriy-Yosypovych Shulyatytskyi
- Date of birth: 11 August 1970 (age 56)
- Place of birth: Ivano-Frankivsk, Soviet Union (now Ukraine)
- Height: 1.74 m (5 ft 9 in)
- Position: Right winger

Youth career
- DYuSSh-3 Ivano-Frankivsk

Senior career*
Years	Team	Apps	(Gls)
1987–1989	Prykarpattya Ivano-Frankivsk	87	(20)
1989	SKA-Karpaty Lviv	8	(1)
1990	Halychyna Drohobych	32	(9)
1991	Metalist Kharkiv	17	(0)
1992	Prykarpattya Ivano-Frankivsk	33	(9)
1993	Karpaty Lviv	15	(2)
1994	Khutrovyk Tysmenytsia	35	(18)
1995	Skala Stryi	5	(0)
1996	Khutrovyk Tysmenytsia	16	(4)
1996–1997	Naftovyk Okhtyrka	43	(10)
1997–1998	Zirka Kirovohrad	24	(1)
1998–1999	Volyn Lutsk	8	(1)
1999	Dinaburg	6	(0)
2001	Tekhno-Center Rohatyn	14	(5)
2001–2002	LUKOR Kalush	23	(9)
2003	Teplovyk Ivano-Frankivsk	3	(0)
2012	Strymba Lypivka	10	(0)
- * Club domestic league appearances and goals as of 16 December 2021

Yuriy Yuriy-Yosypovych Shulyatytskyi (Ukrainian: Юрій Юрій-Йосипович Шулятицький; born 11 August 1970) is a Ukrainian retired professional footballer who played as a right winger.

== Personal life ==
Shulyatytskyi is married and has two daughters. His is the son of Ukrainian football manager Yuriy-Yosyp Shulyatytskyi.

== Honours ==
=== Karpaty Lviv ===
- Ukrainian Cup runner-up: 1992–93
