= Yuriy Dubrovnyi =

Soviet footballer (1954–2025)

Yuriy Dubrovny Юрій Дубровний
Personal information
- Full name: Yuriy Mikhailovich Dubrovny
- Date of birth: 15 April 1954
- Place of birth: Stryi, Drogobych Oblast, Ukrainian SSR, USSR
- Date of death: 1 July 2025 (aged 71)
- Place of death: Stryi, Lviv Oblast, Ukraine
- Height: 1.79 m (5 ft 10 in)
- Position: Midfielder

Youth career
- 1972: Avanhard Stryi
- 1972: LVVPU

Senior career*
| Years | Team | Apps | (Gls) |
| 1973 | Lutsk city team | ? | (1) |
| 1974 | SC Lutsk | ? | (4) |
| 1975–1981 | Karpaty Lviv | 224 | (25) |
| 1982–1983 | Nistru Chișinău | 71 | (8) |
| 1984–1986 | SKA Karpaty Lviv | 100 | (6) |
| 1989 | Wacker Nordhausen | ? | (?) |
| 1989–1990 | Motor Eberswalde | ? | (1) |
| 1991 | Oberhavel Velten | ? | (?) |
| 1991–1992 | Motor Eberswalde | 3 | (?) |
| 1992–1993 | Halychyna Drohobych | 51 | (5) |
| 1994 | Lviv | 12 | (1) |
| 1995 | Halychyna Drohobych | 1 | (0) |
| 1997–1998 | Hazovyk Komarno | 4 | (0) |

Managerial career
- 1992–1993: Halychyna Drohobych (assistant)
- 1995–1996: Halychyna Drohobych
- 1997–2001: Hazovyk-Skala Stryi
- 2002–2003: Karpaty-2 Lviv
- 2004–2005: Techno-Center Rohatyn
- 2005–2006: Nyva Ternopil
- 2007–2008: Rava Rava-Ruska
- 2008–2009: Spartakus Szarowola
- 2011–2012: Karpaty Kolomyia
- * Club domestic league appearances and goals

Yuriy Mykhailovych Dubrovny (Ukrainian: Юрій Михайлович Дубровний; 15 April 1954 – 1 July 2025) was a Ukrainian football player. A midfielder, known for his performances for Karpaty Lviv, he also played for Avanhard Stryi, SC Lutsk, Nistru Chișinău, SKA Karpaty Lviv, FC Lviv, Halychyna Drohobych.

Dubrovnyi was one of the leaders of the midfield of Karpaty Lviv in the late 1970s. As a player he was noted for his knowledge and ability to read the game very well, execution of attacking through-balls, strong shot with both feet, accurate set pieces, and his combative spirit.

He worked as a coach on the teams: Halychyna Drohobych, Hazovyk Komarno, Skala Stryi, Karpaty Kamianka-Buzka, Karpaty-2 Lviv, Techno-Center Rohatyn, Nyva Ternopil, Rava Rava-Ruska. He was last the head coach of the club Karpaty Kolomyia. Dubrovnyi died on 1 July 2025, at the age of 71.

== Sources ==
- Kordiak Yu. E., Yaremko I. Ya. Football-76. Calendar-reference book — Lviv: Kamenyar, 1976. — p. 19.
- Pylypchuk P. "Karpaty" from A to Z (1963—2005). — Lviv: Galician Publishing Union, 2006. — p. 45.
- Pylypchuk P. Football figures of Lviv. — Lviv: Galician Publishing Union, 2008. — p. 51.
