= FC Hazovyk Komarno =

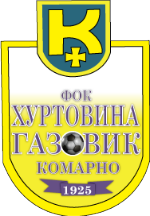
- Founded: 1925
- League: Lvov Oblast First League
- 2019: 3rd
Home colours

FC Hazovyk Komarno (Ukrainian: Футбольний клуб "Газовик Комарно") is a football club from Komarno, Lviv Raion, Ukraine. From 1992 to 2001 the club participated in the Ukrainian championship.

In 2004 another club Hazovyk-Khurtovyna was founded that participates in regional championships.

== Honours ==
- Lviv Oblast Football Championship
  - Winners (1): 1990

== Competitions ==
Season	Div.	Pos.	Pl.	W	D	L	GS	GA	P	Domestic Cup	Europe	Notes
1992	3rd "A" (Transition League)	2	16	8	4	4	24	17	20			
1992–93	3rd (Second League)	7	34	13	8	13	37	47	34			
1993–94	3rd (Second League)	16	42	13	11	18	43	46	37			
1994–95	3rd (Second League)	8	42	22	6	14	66	39	72			
1995–96	3rd (Second League)	10	40	18	8	14	47	38	62			
1996–97	3rd (Second League)	12	30	9	7	14	23	26	34			
1997–98	3rd (Second League)	11	34	11	8	15	30	38	41			
1998–99	3rd (Second League)	4	28	15	5	8	41	25	50			
1999-00	3rd (Second League)	7	30	12	7	11	43	40	43			
2000–01	3rd (Second League)	10	30	9	10	11	26	38	37			
in 2001 moved to Stryi and became Hazovyk-Skala Stryi

== Managers ==
- 1992 Volodymyr Zhuravchak
- 1992–1993 Stepan Yurchyshyn
- 1993 Ivan Pukalskyi
- 1993–1994 Viktor Khodukin
- 1994–1995 Yuriy Dyachuk-Stavytskyi
- 1996 Mykhailo Vilkhovyi
- 1996 Borys Rassykhin
- 1997–2001 Yuriy Dubrovnyi
