= Borys Rassykhin =

Soviet footballer and coach (1937–2021)

Personal information
- Full name: Boris Andreyevich Rassikhin
- Date of birth: 27 April 1937
- Place of birth: Moscow, Russian SFSR, Soviet Union
- Date of death: 16 March 2021 (aged 83)
- Place of death: Lviv, Ukraine
- Position: Midfielder

Senior career*
Years	Team	Apps	(Gls)
1956–1962	Shakhter Stalino	76	(7)
1963–1964	Karpaty Lviv	52	(5)
1965–1967	Naftovyk Drohobych	89	(5)
Total		217	(17)

Managerial career
- FC Shakhtar Chervonohrad
- 1979–1980: Bukovyna Chernivtsi
- 1981–1983: SKA Karpaty Lviv (ass't)
- 1984–1985: Prykarpattia Ivano-Frankivsk
- 1986: Bukovyna Chernivtsi
- 1989: Karpaty Lviv
- 1991: FC Pryladyst Mukacheve
- 1991–1992: FC Halychyna Drohobych
- 1996: FC Hazovyk Komarno
- 1996: FC Ciuhur Ocnița
- 1998–1999: FC Venita Lipcani
- 1999–2000: Bukovyna Chernivtsi (scout)
- * Club domestic league appearances and goals

Borys Rassykhin (Ukrainian: Борис Андрійович Рассихін, Boris Andreyevich Rassikhin; 27 April 1937 – 16 March 2021) was a Ukrainian professional football manager, who previously played as midfielder.

All his games for Shakhtar Rassykhin were played at the Soviet Top League. In 1963 he joined the newly created FC Karpaty Lviv that was admitted to the Class B.

After retiring from a playing career, in 1989 he became the first head coach of the revived Karpaty.
