= Ivan Pastukh =

Ukrainian footballer (born 1998)

Personal information
- Full name: Ivan Ruslanovych Pastukh
- Date of birth: 18 March 1998 (age 28)
- Place of birth: Dolyna, Ukraine
- Height: 1.92 m (6 ft 4 in)
- Position: Centre-back

Team information
- Current team: Skala 1911 Stryi
- Number: 44

Youth career
- 2011–2013: DYuSSh Dolyna
- 2013: Skala Stryi
- 2014: Naftovyk Dolyna
- 2014–2015: Teplovyk-DYuSSh-3 Ivano-Frankivsk
- 2015–2016: Naftovyk Dolyna

Senior career*
Years	Team	Apps	(Gls)
2015–2019	Naftovyk Dolyna	96	(7)
2019–2021	Prykarpattia Ivano-Frankivsk	31	(0)
2022–2023	Naftovyk Dolyna	22	(1)
2023–2025	Skala 1911 Stryi	34	(0)
2025	Naftovyk Dolyna	7	(0)
2026–	Skala 1911 Stryi	6	(0)
- * Club domestic league appearances and goals as of 4 June 2026

Ivan Ruslanovych Pastukh (Ukrainian: Іван Русланович Пастух; born 18 March 1998) is a Ukrainian professional footballer who plays as a centre-back for Skala 1911 Stryi.
