= Vladyslav Savchenko =

Ukrainian footballer (born 2004)

Personal information
- Full name: Vladyslav Serhiyovych Savchenko
- Date of birth: 4 February 2004 (age 22)
- Place of birth: Baryshivka, Ukraine
- Height: 1.88 m (6 ft 2 in)
- Position: Goalkeeper

Youth career
- 2014: DYuSSh Baryshivka
- 2016–2018: Knyazha Shchaslyve
- 2018–2019: Skala Morshyn
- 2019–2020: VIK-Volyn Volodymyr-Volynskyi
- 2020: Volyn Lutsk

Senior career*
Years	Team	Apps	(Gls)
2020–2022	Volyn Lutsk	0	(0)
2020–2021	→ Volyn-2 Lutsk	2	(0)
2022–2024	Mynai	0	(0)
2023–2024	→ Skala 1911 Stryi (loan)	0	(0)
- * Club domestic league appearances and goals as of 5 July 2024

Vladyslav Serhiyovych Savchenko (Ukrainian: Владислав Сергійович Савченко; born 4 February 2004) is a Ukrainian professional footballer who plays as a goalkeeper.
