= Maksym Averyanov =

Ukrainian footballer (born 1997)

Personal information
- Full name: Maksym Anatoliyovych Averyanov
- Date of birth: 22 July 1997 (age 29)
- Place of birth: Cherkasy, Ukraine
- Height: 1.73 m (5 ft 8 in)
- Position: Midfielder

Team information
- Current team: Skala 1911 Stryi
- Number: 10

Youth career
- 2010–2012: Youth Sportive School Cherkasy
- 2012–2014: RVUFK Kyiv

Senior career*
Years	Team	Apps	(Gls)
2014–2016	Metalist Kharkiv	1	(0)
2016	Cherkaskyi Dnipro-2	11	(1)
2017–2018	Zirka Kropyvnytskyi	22	(2)
2019	Kremin Kremenchuk	6	(2)
2019–2020	Cherkashchyna Сherkasy	15	(1)
2020–2021	Dnipro Cherkasy	29	(10)
2021	Kremin Kremenchuk	13	(1)
2022–2023	Zviahel	17	(8)
2023–	Skala 1911 Stryi	35	(6)
- * Club domestic league appearances and goals as of 9 November 2024

Maksym Anatoliyovych Averyanov (Ukrainian: Максим Анатолійович Авер'янов; born 22 July 1997) is a Ukrainian professional footballer who plays as a midfielder for Skala 1911 Stryi.

== Career ==
Averyanov is a product of the Cherkasy and RVUFK Kyiv School Systems.

He made his debut for FC Metalist in the match against FC Dynamo Kyiv on 1 March 2015 in the Ukrainian Premier League.
