= Valentyn Khodukin =

Soviet footballer and Ukrainian football manager (1939–2020)

Personal information
- Full name: Valentyn Mykhailovych Khodukin
- Date of birth: 17 August 1939
- Place of birth: Kharkiv, Ukrainian SSR
- Date of death: 16 December 2020 (aged 81)
- Place of death: Lviv, Ukraine
- Position: Midfielder

Senior career*
Years	Team	Apps	(Gls)
1961	FC Naftovyk Drohobych		
1962	FC Silmash Lviv		
1963	FC Avanhard Ternopil		
1964	FC Naftovyk Drohobych		
1966–1968	FC Sokil Lviv		

Managerial career
- 1991: FC Skala Stryi
- 1992–1996: FC Karpaty Lviv (assistant)
- 1996–1997: FC Tsementnyk-Khorda Mykolaiv
- 1998: FC Verkhovyna Uzhhorod
- 1998–1999: FC Verkhovyna Uzhhorod (assistant)
- 1999–2002: FC Dynamo Lviv
- 2002: FC Karpaty Lviv
- 2003: FC Sokil Zolochiv
- 2003–2004: FC Kryvbas Kryvyi Rih
- 2004: FC Karpaty Lviv
- 2006–2009: Inter Baku
- * Club domestic league appearances and goals

Valentyn Mykhailovych Khodukin (Ukrainian: Валентин Михайлович Ходукін; 17 August 1939 – 16 December 2020) was a Soviet footballer and Ukrainian football manager.

He died on 16 December 2020 in Lviv.
