= Mykhaylo Basarab =

Ukrainian footballer

Personal information
- Full name: Mykhaylo Vasilovich Basarab
- Date of birth: 28 March 1988 (age 38)
- Place of birth: Bolekhiv, Ukrainian SSR
- Position: Defender

Senior career*
Years	Team	Apps	(Gls)
2005–2006	FC Chornohora Ivano-Frankivsk	9	(0)
2006–2007	FC Spartak Ivano-Frankivsk	19	(0)
2007–2008	FC Podillya Khmelnytskyi	2	(0)
2007–2008	→ FC Naftovyk Dolyna (loan)	12	(0)
2008	FC Karpaty Yaremche	8	(0)
2008–2009	FC Nyva-V Vinnytsia	18	(2)
2009–2013	FC Skala Stryi	67	(18)
2011–2012	→ FC Lviv (loan)	10	(0)
2012–2013	→ PFC Nyva Ternopil (loan)	11	(2)
2013–2014	PFC Nyva Ternopil	25	(0)
2014	FC Karpaty Broshniv-Osada	9	(6)
2015	Toronto Atomic FC	21	(3)

Managerial career
- 2023–2024: Skala Stryi
- 2025–: Naftovyk Dolyna
- * Club domestic league appearances and goals

Mykhaylo Basarab (born March 28, 1988) is a former Ukrainian footballer and was the manager of Skala 1911 Stryi.

== Playing career ==
Basarab began playing football in 2005 with FC Chornohora Ivano-Frankivsk in the Ukrainian Second League. In 2006, he made the jump to the Ukrainian First League with FC Spartak Ivano-Frankivsk. After his brief stint in the First League he would have several stints in the Second League with FC Podillya Khmelnytskyi, FC Naftovyk Dolyna, FC Karpaty Yaremche, FC Nyva-V Vinnytsia, and FC Skala Stryi. He returned to the First League in the 2011/2012 season on a loan deal to FC Lviv. Then finished off his career in Ukraine with PFC Nyva Ternopil, and FC Karpaty Broshniv-Osada. In 2015, he went abroad to play with Toronto Atomic FC in the Canadian Soccer League.

== Managerial career ==
In 2018, he was named executive director of FC Naftovyk Dolyna. Basarab was the interim manager for Skala Stryi in 2023. Shortly after, he was made the permanent manager for Skala. He was dismissed from his managerial position on September 19, 2024.

On July 30, 2025, he returned to his former club, Naftovyk Dolyna, as their new manager.
