= Roman Hnativ =

Ukrainian footballer (born 1973)

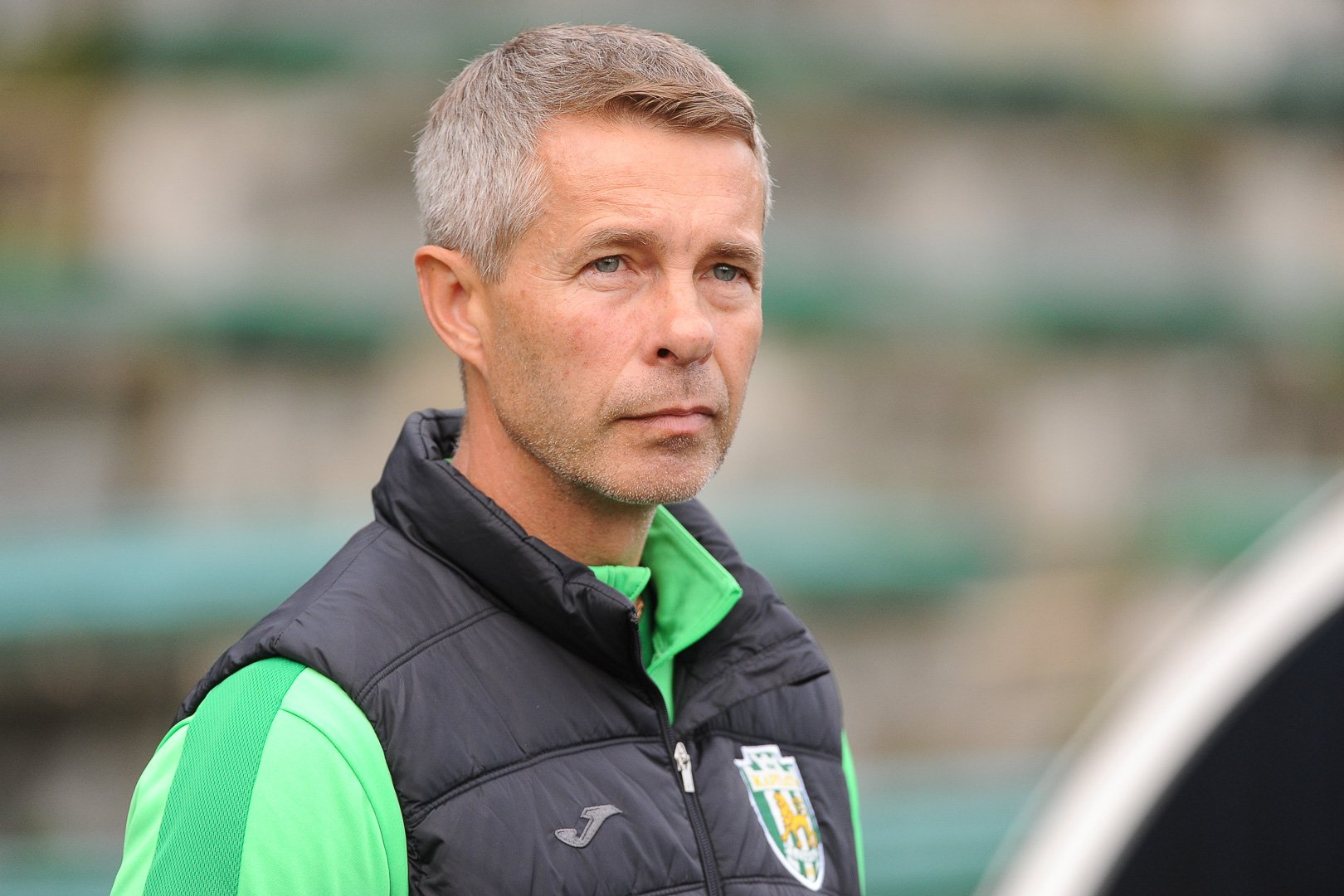

Personal information
- Full name: Roman Mykhailovych Hnativ
- Date of birth: 1 November 1973 (age 52)
- Place of birth: Chervonohrad, Ukrainian SSR
- Height: 1.80 m (5 ft 11 in)
- Position: Midfielder

Senior career*
Years	Team	Apps	(Gls)
1990	Karpaty Lviv	3	(0)
1991–1993	Skala Stryi	89	(9)
1993–1997	Karpaty Lviv	64	(6)
1996	→ Haray Zhovkva	6	(1)
1997	→ Karpaty-2 Lviv	13	(3)
1998–1999	Torpedo Zaporizhzhia	36	(0)
1999–2000	Dynamo Lviv	33	(3)
2001	Karpaty Lviv	5	(1)
2001	→ Karpaty-2 Lviv	3	(0)
2001–2002	Dynamo Lviv	33	(6)
2002	Metalist Kharkiv	0	(0)
2002	→ Metalist-2 Kharkiv	3	(0)
2003	Zakarpattia Uzhhorod	29	(4)
2004	Nistru Otaci	11	(0)
2005	Hazovyk-Skala Stryi	26	(0)
Total		354	(33)

International career
- Soviet Union U-18
1993	Ukraine U-21	2	(0)

Managerial career
- 2006–2008: Karpaty Lviv (academy)
- 2008–2016: UFK Lviv
- 2016: Skala Stryi U-19
- 2017–2018: Skala Stryi
- 2018–2020: Karpaty Lviv U-19
- 2020: Karpaty Lviv (caretaker)
- 2020–2021: Karpaty Halych
- 2023–2024: Karpaty-2 Lviv
- 2024–: Skala 1911 Stryi
- * Club domestic league appearances and goals

Roman Hnativ (Ukrainian: Роман Михайлович Гнатів; born 1 November 1973) is a former Soviet and Ukrainian footballer and Ukrainian football coach who currently manages Karpaty Lviv U-19 team.

== Managerial career ==
In February 2025, he was appointed as coach of Skala Stryi in Ukrainian Second League, replacing Stepan Matviyiv.
