= Oleh Khrustavka =

Ukrainian footballer

Personal information
- Full name: Oleh Romanovych Khrustavka
- Date of birth: 20 April 1998 (age 28)
- Place of birth: Chortkiv, Ukraine
- Height: 1.82 m (6 ft 0 in)
- Position: Right-back

Youth career
- 2013–2014: Chortkiv-Pedlitsey
- 2014–2015: DYuSSh-Chortkiv
- 2015: Chortkiv-Pedlitsey

Senior career*
| Years | Team | Apps | (Gls) |
| 2018 | Krystal Chortkiv | 9 | (0) |
| 2018–2024 | Nyva Ternopil | 121 | (6) |
- * Club domestic league appearances and goals as of 3 July 2024

Oleh Romanovych Khrustavka (Ukrainian: Олег Романович Хруставка; born 20 April 1998) is a Ukrainian professional footballer who plays as a right-back.
