= Taras Puchkovskyi =

Ukrainian footballer (born 1994)

Personal information
- Full name: Taras Mykolayovych Puchkovskyi
- Date of birth: 23 August 1994 (age 32)
- Place of birth: Novovolynsk, Ukraine
- Height: 1.80 m (5 ft 11 in)
- Position: Forward

Team information
- Current team: Ahrobiznes Volochysk
- Number: 31

Youth career
- 2007–2011: UFK Lviv

Senior career*
Years	Team	Apps	(Gls)
2011–2016	Karpaty Lviv	13	(1)
2016	Veres Rivne	0	(0)
2017	Poltava	7	(0)
2018	Merani Martvili	6	(0)
2019	Obolon-Brovar Kyiv	7	(1)
2019	Obolon-Brovar-2 Bucha	8	(2)
2020	Kalush	0	(0)
2020–2022	LNZ Cherkasy	32	(7)
2022–2023	Epitsentr Kamianets-Podilskyi	13	(2)
2023–2024	Skala 1911 Stryi	22	(4)
2024–	Ahrobiznes Volochysk	4	(0)

International career
2010–2011	Ukraine U17	7	(0)
2014	Ukraine U20	1	(0)
2014	Ukraine U21	7	(1)
- * Club domestic league appearances and goals as of 10 June 2025

Taras Mykolayovych Puchkovskyi (Ukrainian: Тарас Миколайович Пучковський; born 23 August 1994) is a Ukrainian professional footballer who plays as a forward for Ahrobiznes Volochysk.

== Career ==
He played for club Karpaty Lviv in Ukrainian Premier League.

Puchkovskyi is the product of the UFK Lviv School System. His first trainer was Yaroslav Dmytrasevych. He made his debut for FC Karpaty entering as a second-half substitute against FC Dynamo Kyiv on 14 September 2012 in Ukrainian Premier League.

He also played for Ukrainian under-17 national football team and was called up for other age level representations.
