= Vadym Merdyeyev =

Ukrainian footballer (born 2002)

Personal information
- Full name: Vadym Vadymovych Merdyeyev
- Date of birth: 13 August 2002 (age 24)
- Place of birth: Nove Davydkovo, Ukraine
- Height: 1.80 m (5 ft 11 in)
- Position: Right winger

Team information
- Current team: Skala 1911 Stryi
- Number: 18

Youth career
- 2015–2017: SDYuSShOR Uzhhorod
- 2017–2018: Shakhtar Donetsk
- 2018–2019: SDYuSShOR Uzhhorod
- 2019: F. Medvidya Nove Davydkovo

Senior career*
Years	Team	Apps	(Gls)
2019	F. Medvidya Nove Davydkovo	4	(3)
2019–2020	Karpaty Lviv	0	(0)
2020–2021	Karpaty Halych	20	(4)
2021–2022	Uzhhorod	18	(0)
2022–2024	Mynai	0	(0)
2022–2024	→ Khust (loan)	30	(6)
2024–	Skala 1911 Stryi	7	(0)
- * Club domestic league appearances and goals as of 15 June 2024

Vadym Vadymovych Merdyeyev (Ukrainian: Вадим Вадимович Мердєєв; born 13 August 2002) is a Ukrainian professional footballer who plays as a right winger for Ukrainian club Skala 1911 Stryi.
