= Stepan Matviyiv =

Ukrainian footballer (born 1968)

Personal information
- Full name: Stepan Oleksiyovych Matviyiv
- Date of birth: 10 March 1968 (age 58)
- Place of birth: Pishchany, Stryi Raion, Ukrainian SSR
- Height: 1.75 m (5 ft 9 in)
- Position: Midfielder

Team information
- Current team: Chornomorets Odesa (assistant)

Senior career*
| Years | Team | Apps | (Gls) |
| 1986 | Mashynobudivnyk Borodyanka | | |
| 1988–1990 | SKF Severomorsk | ? | (7) |
| 1990–1993 | Dnipro Cherkasy | 114 | (41) |
| 1993–1995 | Boryspil / CSKA-Borysfen Kyiv | 75 | (20) |
| 1995 | → CSKA Kyiv | 1 | (0) |
| 1995–1997 | Prykarpattia Ivano-Frankivsk | 41 | (3) |
| 1997 | → Tysmenytsia | 3 | (1) |
| 1998 | Volyn Lutsk | 15 | (2) |
| 1998–1999 | Torpedo Zaporizhzhia | 22 | (2) |
| 1998–1999 | → Viktor Zaporizhzhia | 4 | (2) |
| 2000–2001 | Prykarpattia Ivano-Frankivsk | 50 | (2) |
| 2000–2001 | → Prykarpattia-2 Ivano-Frankivsk | 12 | (0) |
| 2002 | FC Yevropa Pryluky | ? | (?) |
| 2002 | Borysfen Boryspil | 0 | (0) |
| 2002 | → Borysfen-2 Boryspil | 1 | (0) |

Managerial career
- 2003: Borysfen-2 Boryspil (assistant)
- 2003: Borysfen-2 Boryspil
- 2004: Systema-Boreks Borodianka
- 2004: Ukraine U-17 (assistant)
- 2004–2005: Borysfen Boryspil (assistant)
- 2005: Borysfen Boryspil
- 2006: Metalurh Donetsk (youth)
- 2006: Metalurh Donetsk
- 2006–2007: Knyazha Shchaslyve
- 2008: Prykarpattya Ivano-Frankivsk
- 2009–2011: Lviv (assistant)
- 2011–2014: Chornomorets Odesa (assistant)
- 2015–2016: Gabala (assistant)
- 2017–2019: Kalush (assistant)
- 2019–2020: Kalush
- 2020–2021: Shakhtyor Soligorsk (assistant)
- 2022–2024: Chornomorets Odesa (assistant)
- 2024: Skala 1911 Stryi
- * Club domestic league appearances and goals

Stepan Matviyiv (Ukrainian: Степан Олексійович Матвіїв; 10 March 1968) is a Ukrainian football manager and former player.

Matviyiv was born in Stryi Raion, Lviv Oblast. He made his professional debut in the Soviet Second League in 1990 for FC Dnipro Cherkasy.

== Honours ==
- Ukrainian Second League champion: 1992–93, 1993–94
