= FC Naftovyk Dolyna =

- Full name: FC Naftovyk Dolyna
- Founded: 1955
- League: Ivano-Frankivsk Oblast Championship
- 2018–19: 1st; Winners

FC Naftovyk Dolyna (Ukrainian: "Нафтовик" (Долина)) is a Ukrainian amateur football club based in Dolyna, Ivano-Frankivsk Oblast.

The club played in the Ivano-Frankivs'k oblast league and in the early 1990s. They also entered the Ukrainian Amateur Championships in 1996 and finished 3rd in the final championships. The club was granted entry into the Ukrainian Professional Leagues in the next season (1997/98) they entered in the Ukrainian Second League.

The club competed from 1997 to 2008 at this level. During the winter break of the 2007–08 season the club abruptly withdrew from the competition.

The club readmitted itself to the regional competition of the oblast and has been competing there since 2009.

== League and cup history ==
Season	Div.	Pos.	Pl.	W	D	L	GS	GA	P	Domestic Cup	Europe	Notes
1997–98	3rd "A"	10	34	14	6	14	35	35	48	1/256 finals		
1998–99	3rd "A"	9	28	11	6	11	22	23	39	1/128 finals		
1999–00	3rd "A"	10	30	8	12	10	26	32	36	1/4 finals Second League Cup		
2000–01	3rd "A"	13	30	6	8	16	34	43	26	1/8 finals Second League Cup		
2001–02	3rd "A"	16	36	9	6	21	20	56	33	1st round		
2002–03	3rd "A"	4	28	16	6	6	35	16	54	1/32 Round		
2003–04	3rd "A"	9	30	10	7	13	32	37	37	1/32 finals		
2004–05	3rd "A"	12	28	9	3	16	25	49	30	1/32 finals		
2005–06	3rd "A"	13	28	8	3	17	22	45	27	1/16 finals		
2006–07	3rd "A"	14	28	3	7	18	14	40	16	1/32 finals		
2007–08	3rd "A"	16	30	4	2	24	13	33	14	Did not enter		Withdraws
