= SC Vilkhivtsi =

- Full name: Sports club Vilkhivtsi
- Founded: 1969
- Ground: Vilkhivtsi Arena
- Capacity: 1,500
- Chairman: Mykhaylo Tsiryk
- Manager: Oleksiy Zorin
- League: Ukrainian Second League
- 2024–25: Second League, 7th in Group B
Home colours	Away colours

SC Vilkhivtsi is a Ukrainian football club from Vilkhivtsi, Zakarpattia Oblast. In selected sources it also referred to as FC Vilkhivtsi

In 2023 it debuted at national level competing in the AAFU competitions such as championship and cup. In 2024 it was admitted to the Ukrainian Second League.

== Honours ==
- Zakarpattia Oblast (1st tier)
  - Winners (1): 2022
  - Runners-up (1): 2018
- Zakarpattia Oblast (2nd tier)
  - Winners (1): 2015

== Current squad ==
As of 22 March 2026

Note: Flags indicate national team as defined under FIFA eligibility rules; some limited exceptions apply. Players may hold more than one non-FIFA nationality.

No.	Pos.	Nation	Player
4	MF	UKR	Nazar Sapiha
5	DF	UKR	Bohdan Maksymenko
7	FW	UKR	Svyatoslav Botskiv
8	MF	UKR	Andriy Havrylyuk
9	MF	UKR	Vasyl Debych
10	MF	UKR	Illya Tsurkan
11	FW	UKR	Dmytro Humenyak
12	DF	UKR	Daniil Vapnyar
14	MF	UKR	Oleksandr Hlahola
16	DF	UKR	Yehor Bazarov
17	MF	UKR	Andriy Petryk
22	MF	UKR	Edvard Kobak
23	DF	UKR	Dmytro Nyemchaninov (captain)

No.	Pos.	Nation	Player
24	MF	UKR	Vladyslav Funduk
33	DF	UKR	Volodymyr Hrachov
44	DF	UKR	Arseniy Zhylenko
47	FW	UKR	Nazariy Bohomaz
50	GK	UKR	Dmytro Kosach
71	GK	UKR	Mykhaylo Abramov
77	MF	UKR	Kyrylo Tymoshenko
88	MF	UKR	Ihor Vahin
92	MF	UKR	Serhiy Panasenko
95	FW	UKR	Vyacheslav Sobosloy
97	GK	UKR	Oleksandr Kiktenko
99	FW	UKR	Mykhaylo Shestakov

== Notable coaches ==
- Serhiy Diryavka
- Oleksiy Zorin

== League and cup history ==
Season	Div.	Pos.	Pl.	W	D	L	GS	GA	P	Domestic Cup	Europe		Notes
2023–24	4th (Amateur League:Group 1)	8_{/11}	20	7	3	10	30	31	24	-	-	-	Admission to Ukrainian Second League
2024–25	3th (Second League:Group A)	7_{/10}	18	5	4	9	20	29	19	First preliminary round (1/64)	-	-	-
2025–26	3th (Second League:Group A)	8_{/11}	30	12	5	13	50	46	41	Round of 64 (1/32)	-	-	-
2026–27	3th (Second League:Group A)	6_{/9}	11	3	5	3	12	14	21	Round of 64 (1/32)	-	-	TBD
