= Andriy Ralyuchenko =

Ukrainian footballer (born 1995)

Personal information
- Full name: Andriy Serhiyovych Ralyuchenko
- Date of birth: 8 June 1995 (age 31)
- Place of birth: Kharkiv, Ukraine
- Height: 1.78 m (5 ft 10 in)
- Position: Midfielder

Team information
- Current team: Skala 1911 Stryi
- Number: 6

Youth career
- 2008–2012: Metalist Kharkiv

Senior career*
Years	Team	Apps	(Gls)
2012–2016	Metalist Kharkiv	7	(0)
2016	Veres Rivne	5	(0)
2017–2019	Metalist 1925 Kharkiv	60	(1)
2019	Hirnyk-Sport Horishni Plavni	6	(0)
2020	Vovchansk	5	(0)
2020–2023	Metalist Kharkiv	55	(0)
2023	Mynai	12	(0)
2024–	Skala 1911 Stryi	53	(8)
- * Club domestic league appearances and goals as of 4 June 2026

Andriy Serhiyovych Ralyuchenko (Ukrainian: Андрій Сергійович Ралюченко; born 8 June 1995) is a Ukrainian professional footballer who plays as a midfielder for Skala 1911 Stryi.

== Career ==
Ralyuchenko is a product of the FC Metalist School System.

He spent his career in the Ukrainian Premier League Reserves club FC Metalist. In 2015 Ralyuchenko was promoted to the Ukrainian Premier League's squad. He made his debut for Metalist Kharkiv in the Ukrainian Premier League in the match against FC Volyn Lutsk on 6 March 2016.

In July 2016 he was signed by Veres Rivne. In December 2016 contract was terminated.

== Personal life ==
He is the son of the professional football manager Serhiy Ralyuchenko (1962–2024).
