= Illya Tsurkan =

Ukrainian footballer (born 2002)

Personal information
- Full name: Illya Serhiyovych Tsurkan
- Date of birth: 17 April 2002 (age 24)
- Place of birth: Ternivka, Ukraine
- Height: 1.65 m (5 ft 5 in)
- Position: Central midfielder

Team information
- Current team: Vilkhivtsi
- Number: 10

Youth career
- 2014–2019: Inter Dnipro
- 2019: Petrykivka

Senior career*
Years	Team	Apps	(Gls)
2019–2020	Petrykivka	10	(0)
2020–2023	Inhulets Petrove	0	(0)
2022–2023	→ Skoruk Tomakivka (loan)	17	(0)
2023–2024	UCSA Tarasivka	9	(1)
2024–2025	Skala 1911 Stryi	18	(1)
2025	Revera 1908 Ivano-Frankivsk	6	(0)
2026–	Vilkhivtsi	23	(4)
- * Club domestic league appearances and goals as of 6 June 2025

Illya Serhiyovych Tsurkan (Ukrainian: Ілля Сергійович Цуркан; born 17 April 2002) is a Ukrainian professional footballer who plays as a central midfielder for Vilkhivtsi.
