= Sokil Stadium (Stryi) =

Coordinates: 49°15′01″N 23°51′23″E

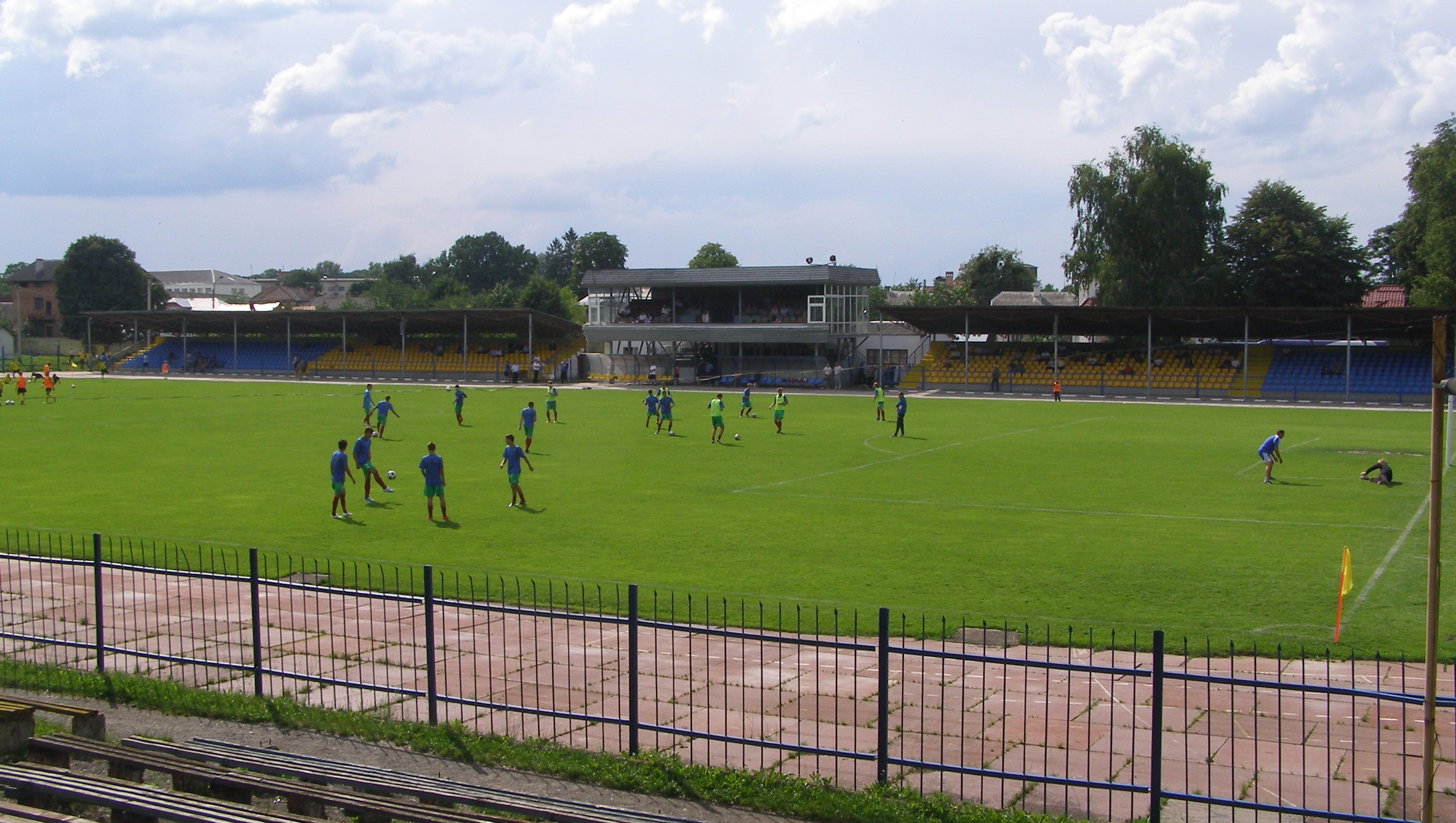
- Interactive map of Sokil Stadium
- Location: Stryi, Ukraine
- Owner: Stryi city authorities
- Capacity: 6,000 (football)
- Surface: Grass
- Field size: 105x68 m

Construction
- Opened: 1920s
- Renovated: 2005

Tenants
- FC Skala Stryi (1991-1996); FC Hazovyk-Skala Stryi (2001-2005); FC Skala Stryi (2004) (2009-2018); FC Skala Stryi (2020-present)

Stryi City Stadium "Sokil" is a multi-use stadium in Stryi, Ukraine.

It is currently used mostly for football matches, and is the home of FC Skala Stryi. The stadium holds 6,000 people in total.
