= FC Skala Stryi (1911) =

Football Club Skala 1911 Stryi
- Full name: FC Skala 1911 Stryi
- Nicknames: Stryians, Stryi, Raspberry-green
- Founded: 1911; 115 years ago
- Ground: Sokil Stadium
- Capacity: 6,000
- Manager: Roman Hnativ
- League: Ukrainian Second League
- 2025–26: Ukrainian Second League, 3rd in Group A
Home colours	Away colours

Emblem of Hazovyk-Skala

Football Club Skala 1911 Stryi (Ukrainian: «Скала 1911» Стрий) is a Ukrainian professional football team. The team is based in Stryi.

The club traces its history to times of the Austria-Hungary just before the World War I, when in Stryi was formed the first Ukrainian football team as part of the local Sich sports society. The same society which contributed to formation of the Sich Riflemen. After the World War I, when territories of the Western Ukraine were part of the Second Polish Republic, Skala reappeared again competing at regional competitions. The team remained at regional level following the World War II when the region was annexed by the Soviet Union.

It was not until Ukraine gained full independence, when FC Skala gained a professional status in 1992 and was admitted in Ukrainian football competitions replacing another team from Kamianka-Buzka. Skala failed to retain its professional status and there were several instances when the club was revived. The last revival occurred in 2020 and in 2023 the club was admitted to the professional competitions as Skala 1911 Stryi.

== History ==
Over the years there were several clubs connected with Skala Stryi starting from 1911.

=== Club of Austria-Hungary and Poland ===
The first recorded match in Stryi was at times of Austria-Hungary, so called Kingdom of Galicia and Lodomeria on 29 June 1906 when a team of Stryj gymnasium (high school) lost to a team from Lemberg (Lviv). The next year (1907) in Stryj was established Studencki Klub Sportowy which soon was renamed as KS Pogon Stryj.

Starting from around 1910 there started to appear number of football teams in the city of Stryi: Pogon (Polish), Hakoah (Jewish), Sich (Ukrainian). Sich that was created in 1911 was the predecessor of Skala. The president of Sich became well known Ukrainian composer Ostap Nyzhankivsky. Due to the fact that name Sich can be very politically offensive towards Polish nationals, the name was changed to Skala in 1912 as USC Skala. As a word Skala is an obsolete form of another word Skelia and it is also used in the Russian language. However soon after 1912 the club disappeared. Some players joined the SSC Pogon Stryj, others discontinued to play football. During the World War I there was no sport life in Stryi. During the Ukrainian-Polish War, Poles killed Ostap Nyzhankivsky in 1919.

In 1922 the football team Skala Stryi was revived as a section of the Gymnastic Association Sokil. Sokil was a member of the Ukrainian Sports Union which however refused to cooperate with the Polish authorities therefore the Ukrainian teams were banned from the Polish competitions. In 1925 Skala Stryi became an independent organization and a member of the Ukrainian Sports Union. Starting from 1928 the Ukrainian football clubs started to join the Lviv District Football Union. The first team that joined the union was the Sports Association Ukraine. In 1931 Skala also followed that example. In 1933 however the club left the Lviv District Football Union and returned to the Ukrainian Sports Union. In 1936 Skala once again joined the Polish Football Federation. There was created the new Stanislawow District Football Union and all clubs from Stryi were initially transferred to it. However, due to difficult transportation communications with the rest of the Stanislawow Voivodeship, the city clubs petitioned to stay with the Lviv District Football Union.

=== Avanhard (Naftovyk, Kolhospnyk) Stryi ===
Following the Soviet annexation in 1944, Skala was disbanded. In the city of Stryi, Soviet sports organizations such as Avanhard, Lokomotyv, Kolhospnyk, and Naftovyk were formed. In 1949 and 1951, Naftovyk and then Kolhospnyk competed at the republican football competitions (Football Championship of the Ukrainian SSR). At that time, the Stryi's football teams also competed at the Drohobych Oblast football competitions. Following the merger of Drohobych Oblast in May of 1959, the Stryi's football teams were competing in the Lviv Oblast football competitions. In 1971 to 1973, Avanhard competed at the republican competitions for KFK (Ukrainian Amateur Football Championship).

=== Skala Stryi (Karpaty Kamianka-Buzka) ===
The football club Skala was revived in 1989 with some support from the public and the Stryi city sports committee headed by Vasyl Kokhanchyk as well as part of the drive for the Ukrainian national revival (so-called "National Revival Wave"). The first president became Volodymyr Buriy, who was assisted by Mykola Zelinsky (associated with FC Medyk Morshyn). In the beginning, the newly created club played in competitions of the Lviv Oblast championship.

Following dissolution of the Soviet Union and the creation of the independent Ukrainian football championship, in 1992 FC Karpaty Kamianka-Buzka, a club of the 1991 Soviet Second League B, was admitted to the 1992 Ukrainian First League, but due to a difficult financial situation decided to withdraw. The Stryi club played its first game against FC Zakarpattia Uzhhorod hosting it in Stryi and tying the match at 0. The season Skala finished with 31 points tying for the 4th place along with Zakarpattia and FC Ros Bila Tserkva. The club's best scorer in 1992 became Vasyl Kardash with 6 goals.

=== Hazovyk-Skala Stryi (Hazovyk Komarno) ===
Later in 2001 the city of Stryi received a new team that relocated from Komarno, FC Hazovyk Komarno. The club was reorganized once again when its main football team relocated to Stryi. In 2004 this team under the name of FC Hazovyk-Skala Stryi won the Druha Liha Group A championship and was promoted to the Ukrainian First League. Then the team became financially distressed after the 2005/06 season and was bought by the Ukrainian insurance company "Kniazha". They moved again and now to Lviv changing its name to FC Lviv.

=== Skala 1911 Stryi ===
The new club was revived in 2020 and was headed by its president Oleh Kanivets. Before starting at national amateur level (AAFU), in 2022 Kanivets replaced his former head coach with Mykola Vasylyshyn. The next season, Skala 1911 was admitted to Druha Liha. Vasylyshyn resigned on 30 September 2023. In February 2024, during the winter transfers, Skala 1911 Stryi announced the signing of Illya Tsurkan from UCSA Tarasivka and Oleksandr Rudenko from Kudrivka.

== Honors ==
- Ukrainian Second League
  - Winners: 2003–04 (Group "A")

== Current squad ==
As of 1 March 2026

Note: Flags indicate national team as defined under FIFA eligibility rules; some limited exceptions apply. Players may hold more than one non-FIFA nationality.

No.	Pos.	Nation	Player
5	DF	UKR	Kyrylo Pavlyuk
6	MF	UKR	Andriy Ralyuchenko
7	MF	UKR	Volodymyr Lukyanchenko
8	FW	UKR	Roman Lisovyk
10	FW	UKR	Ivan Zhumiga
11	MF	UKR	Ruslan Malskyi
12	GK	UKR	Maksym Sivirukhin
13	MF	UKR	Vadym Hudzinskyi
14	MF	UKR	Andriy Vilkhovyi
15	MF	UKR	Maksym Matsievskyi
16	FW	UKR	Oleksandr Fetko
18	DF	UKR	Denys Harkavenko

No.	Pos.	Nation	Player
19	MF	UKR	Ihor Vorobyak
21	DF	UKR	Oleksandr Khomyshak
22	DF	UKR	Danilo Yanyuk
23	DF	UKR	Nikita Lednev
30	MF	UKR	Vladyslav Chernenko
31	GK	UKR	Kyrylo Arkhypchuk
44	DF	UKR	Ivan Pastukh
74	FW	UKR	Maksym Humenyuk
77	FW	UKR	Yan Karanha
95	FW	UKR	Yaroslav Kravchenko
99	GK	UKR	Denys Zavhorodniy

== League and cup history ==
=== As Karpaty Kamianka-Buzka → Skala Stryi ===
Soviet Union

Season	Div.	Pos.	Pl.	W	D	L	GS	GA	P	Domestic Cup	Europe	Notes
1991	4th "I"	16	50	15	15	20	48	55	45			Karpaty Kamianka-Buzka

Ukraine

Season	Div.	Pos.	Pl.	W	D	L	GS	GA	P	Domestic Cup	Europe	Notes
1992	2nd "B"	6	26	11	9	6	39	24	31	1/8 finals		Renamed as Skala; Relocated to Stryi
1992–93	2nd	11	42	15	11	16	49	58	41	1/64 finals		
1993–94	2nd	16	38	11	17	20	36	48	29	1/16 finals		
1994–95	2nd	19	42	12	9	21	31	65	45	1/64 finals		
1995–96	2nd	22	42	2	3	37	21	108	9	1/64 finals		Relegated; Skala dissolved

5 seasons

=== As Hazovyk-Skala Stryi ===
Season	Div.	Pos.	Pl.	W	D	L	GS	GA	P	Domestic Cup	Europe	Notes
-2001	Refer to FC Hazovyk Komarno											
2001–02	3rd "A"	10	36	12	11	13	31	38	47	2nd Round		as Hazovyk-Skala Stryi
2002–03	3rd "A"	9	28	8	9	11	15	23	33	1/32 finals		
2003–04	3rd "A"	1	30	18	11	1	46	15	65	1/16 finals		Promoted
2004–05	2nd	12	34	12	7	15	34	39	43	1/32 finals		
2005–06	2nd	6	34	14	10	10	35	33	52	1/8 finals		Club moved to Lviv; Renamed FC Lviv
2006–	Refer to FC Lviv											

5 seasons

=== As Skala Morshyn → Stryi ===
9 seasons

=== As Skala 1911 Stryi ===
Season	Div.	Pos.	Pl.	W	D	L	GS	GA	P	Domestic Cup	Other		Notes
2022–23	4th Gr"A" (Amateur League)	3	12	8	1	3	37	8	25	Amateur (1/4 finals)	AL	Semifinals	as Skala 1911 Stryi
2023–24	3rd(Second League)	6	26	12	2	12	32	33	38	1/16 finals			
2024–25	3rd Gr"A" (Second League)	3	18	10	3	5	31	18	33	1/32 finals			The league's play-offs:Third place-Lokomotyv Kyiv 4-1 FC Chernihiv 2-3 0-1 (2-4)
2025–26	3rd Gr"A" (Second League)	7	30	13	5	12	62	48	44	1/32 finals			
2026–27	3rd Gr"A" (Second League)	7	11	3	2	6	14	21	11	1/32 finals			TBD

== Officials ==
- Volodymyr Buriy (Skala)
- Anatoliy Barabasevych (Skala)
- Bohdan Kobryn (Skala)
- Volodymyr Fek (Hazovyk-Skala)
- Oleksandr Didenko (Hazovyk-Skala, vice-president)
- Rostyslav Zaremba (Hazovyk-Skala, sports director)

== Head coaches ==
=== Karpaty → Skala ===
- 1989–1991: Mykhailo Vilkhovyi (Karpaty Kamianka-Buzka)
- 1991–1991: Volodymyr Zhuravchak (Karpaty Kamianka-Buzka)

- 1991–1991: Valentyn Khodukin
- 1992–1992: Mykhailo Vilkhovyi
- 1992–1993: Andriy Karimov
- 1993–1993: Yuriy Shulyatytskyi
- 1993–1994: Yuriy Smierdov
- 1994–1994: Mykhailo Vilkhovyi
- 1994–1994: Yuriy Smierdov
- 1995–1995: Roman Pokora
- 1996–1996: Yuriy Shulyatytskyi

=== Hazovyk → Hazovyk-Skala ===
- 1997–2001: Yuriy Dubrovnyi (coached FC Hazovyk Komarno)
- 2002–2003: Vyacheslav Mavrov
- 2003–2006: Bohdan Bandura

=== Skala 1911 ===
- 2022–2023: Mykola Vasylyshyn
- 2023–2024: Mykhaylo Basarab
- 2024: Stepan Matviiv
- 2024–present: Roman Hnativ
