= 2023–24 FC Chernihiv season =

Football club season

Chernihiv
2023–24 season
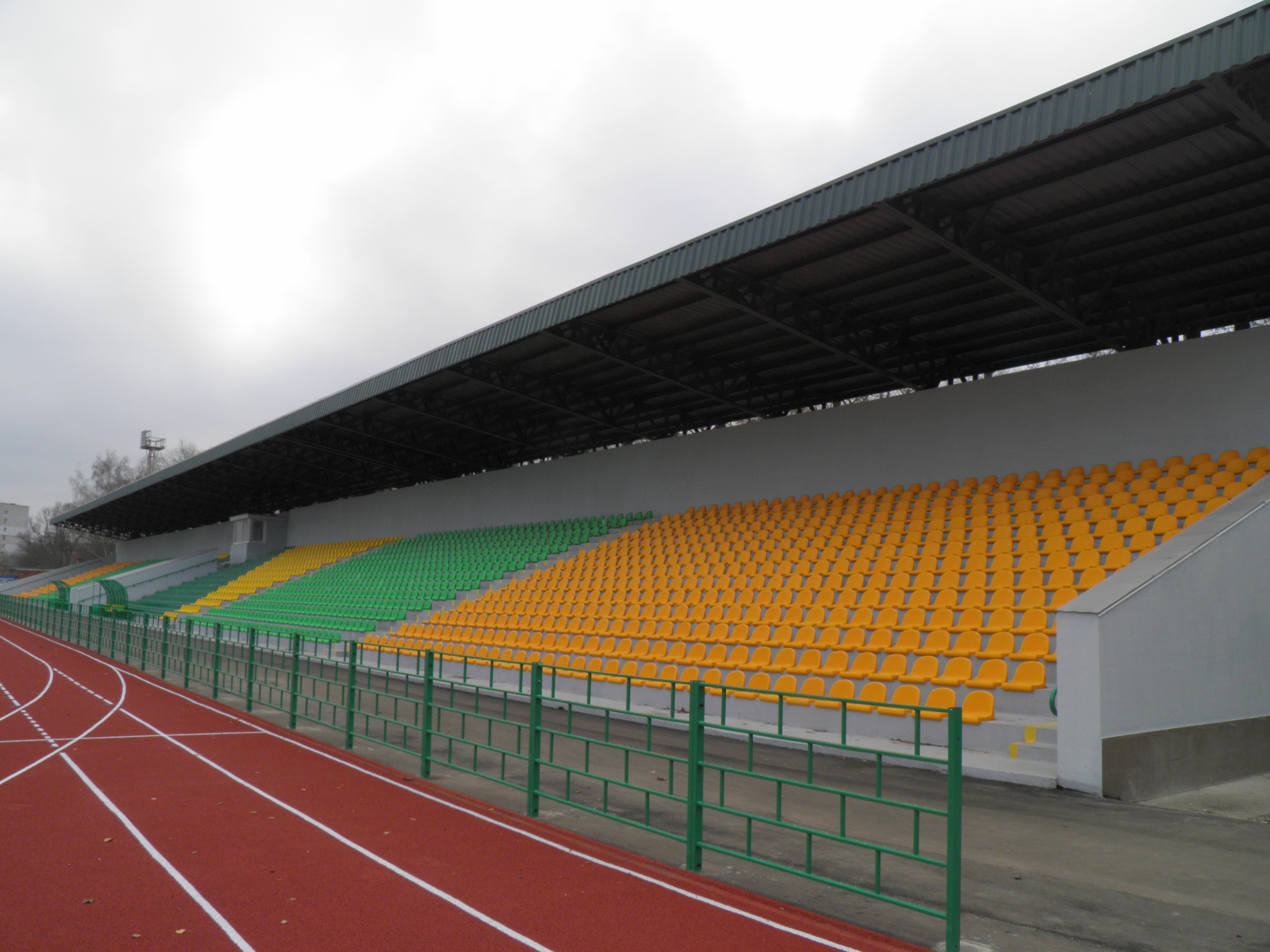
- Owner: Yuriy Synytsya
- Director: Mykola Synytsya
- Manager: Valeriy Chornyi
- Stadium: Chernihiv Arena; Yunist Stadium
- First League: 19th Relegated
- Ukrainian Cup: Round of 128 (1/64)
- Top goalscorer: League: Pavlo Fedosov (9); All: Pavlo Fedosov (9)
- Biggest win: Khust 2-4 Chernihiv
- Biggest defeat: Inhulets Petrove 6-1 Chernihiv
Home colours	Away colours	Third colours

During the 2023–24 season, FC Chernihiv competed in the Ukrainian First League. Due to the ruin of the Chernihiv Arena, the club used Yunist Stadium. Following this season, the club was relegated to Ukrainian Second League.

== Season summary ==
The season began with the release of Volodymyr Zubashivskyi, Myroslav Serdyuk, Oleksandr Rudenko, and Dmytro Kulyk. In June 2023, Jako was confirmed as sponsor. The club signed young players such as Nikita Posmashnyi, Dzhilindo Bezghubchenko, Daniil Davydenko, Stanislav Khomych, Artem Strilets and Denys Herasymenko. The club's first victory was against Dinaz Vyshhorod in Chernihiv. On 19 August, due to a Russian missile strike that killed seven people, the match against FSC Mariupol was postponed. The club begins to lose many matches and the new young players are unable to replace the players who have left the club. In October 2023, Artem Strilets was called up by the Ukraine national student football team.In the winter transfer session, the club intervenes by quickly purchasing players with some experience such as Danyil Khondak and Oleh Osypenko from Veres Rivne and Inhulets Petrove, respectively. Also arriving were Dmytro Sakhno from Viktoriya Sumy, Bogdan Lyanskoronskyi from Kudrivka and Daniil Volskyi from Nyva Ternopil. At the same time they've lost two main players such as Anatoliy Romanchenko and Maksym Serdyuk moved to Inhulets Petrove and Livyi Bereh Kyiv, respectively. The club finished in nineteenth place and was relegated to the Ukrainian Second League.

== Players ==
=== Squad information ===
As of 21 December 2024

Squad no.	Name	Nationality	Position	Date of birth (age)
Goalkeepers
1	Oleksandr Shyray	(Ukraine)	GK	21 February 1992 (aged 30)
22	Oleksandr Roshchynskyi	(Ukraine)	GK	30 November 2000 (aged 21)
72	Yehor Kolomiets	(Ukraine)	GK	9 September 2003 (aged 18)
99	Denys Herasymenko	(Ukraine)	GK	(age 16)
Defenders
2	Eduard Halstyan	(Ukraine) (Armenia)	DF	1 October 1998 (aged 23)
3	Maksym Shumylo	(Ukraine)	DF	31 August 2002 (aged 19)
6	Andriy Veresotskyi	(Ukraine)	DF	21 January 1992 (aged 30)
15	Andriy Lakeyenko	(Ukraine)	DF	29 September 1999 (aged 22)
23	Oleksiy Zenchenko	(Ukraine)	DF	17 October 1996 (aged 25)
Midfielders
5	Anatoliy Romanchenko	(Ukraine)	MF	19 May 2001 (aged 21)
7	Dmytro Myronenko	(Ukraine)	MF	7 March 1996 (aged 26)
8	Andriy Makarenko	(Ukraine)	MF	13 December 1996 (aged 25)
9	Kyrylo Kryvoborodenko	(Ukraine)	MF	8 September 1996 (aged 25)
10	Vyacheslav Koydan	(Ukraine)	MF	5 July 1994 (aged 28)
13	Dzhilindo Bezghubchenko	(Ukraine)	MF	7 February 2003 (aged 19)
14	Dmytro Sakhno	(Ukraine)	MF	7 February 2003 (aged 19)
17	Stanislav Khomych	(Ukraine)	MF	27 June 2003 (aged 19)
19	Nikita Posmashnyi	(Ukraine)	MF	10 June 2003 (aged 20)
21	Vladyslav Shkolnyi	(Ukraine)	MF	14 March 1999 (aged 23)
26	Kyrylo Pinchuk	(Ukraine)	MF	16 February 1999 (aged 23)
30	Artur Bybik	(Ukraine)	MF	26 July 2001 (aged 21)
31	Vitaliy Mentey (Captain)	(Ukraine)	MF	5 August 1992 (aged 30)
77	Maksym Serdyuk	(Ukraine)	MF	21 May 2002 (aged 21)
91	Artem Strilets	(Ukraine)	MF	27 January 2002 (aged 21)
Forwards
11	Pavlo Fedosov	(Ukraine)	FW	14 August 1996 (aged 25)
79	Roman Vovk	(Ukraine)	FW	5 March 1997 (aged 25)

== Management team ==
Position	Name	Year appointed	Last club/team
Manager	(Ukraine) Valeriy Chornyi	2021	Avanhard Koriukivka
Assistant Coach	(Ukraine) Andriy Polyanytsya	2022	SDYuShOR Desna Chernihiv
Goalkeeping Coach	(Ukraine) Artem Padun	2020	SDYuShOR Desna Chernihiv

== Transfers ==
=== In ===
Date	Pos.	Player	Age	Moving from	Type	Fee	Source
Summer
6 July 2023	MF	(Ukraine) Nikita Posmashnyi	20	(Ukraine) Desna-3 Chernihiv	Transfer	Free	
6 July 2023	MF	(Ukraine) Dzhilindo Bezghubchenko	20	(Ukraine) Dinaz Vyshhorod	Transfer	Free	
27 July 2023	MF	(Ukraine) Daniil Davydenko	23	Unattached	Transfer	Free	
27 July 2023	MF	(Ukraine) Stanislav Khomych	20	(Ukraine) Desna-3 Chernihiv	Transfer	Free	
9 August 2023	MF	(Ukraine) Artem Strilets	21	(Ukraine) Khust	Transfer	Free	
20 September 2023	GK	(Ukraine) Denys Herasymenko	21	(Czech Republic) MSM Football Academy	Transfer	Free	
Winter
5 March 2024	MF	(Ukraine) Dmytro Sakhno	21	(Ukraine) Viktoriya Sumy	Transfer	Free	
13 March 2024	MF	(Ukraine) Bogdan Lyanskoronskyi	19	(Ukraine) Kudrivka	Transfer	Free	
13 March 2024	DF	(Ukraine) Danyil Khondak	22	(Ukraine) Veres Rivne	On Loan	Free	
13 March 2024	MF	(Ukraine) Oleh Osypenko	22	(Ukraine) Inhulets Petrove	On Loan	Free	
21 March 2024	MF	(Ukraine) Daniil Volskyi	19	(Ukraine) Nyva Ternopil	Transfer	Free	

=== Out ===
Date	Pos.	Player	Age	Moving from	Type	Fee	Source
Summer
28 June 2023	DF	(Ukraine) Volodymyr Zubashivskyi	24	(Ukraine) Kudrivka	End Contract	Free	
29 June 2023	DF	(Ukraine) Oleksandr Rudenko	24	(Ukraine) Kudrivka	End Contract	Free	
1 July 2023	GK	(Ukraine) Artem Padun	38	Retired			
17 July 2023	MF	(Ukraine) Myroslav Serdyuk	23	(Ukraine) Kudrivka	End Contract	Free	
18 July 2023	MF	(Ukraine) Mykola Syrash	24	(Ukraine) Kudrivka	End Contract	Free	
20 July 2023	FW	(Ukraine) Dmytro Kulyk	22	(Ukraine) Kudrivka	End Contract	Free	
14 November 2023	MF	(Ukraine) Stanislav Khomych	20	Unattached	Transfer	Free	
Winter
8 January 2024	GK	(Ukraine) Yehor Kolomiets	21	Unattached	End Contract	Free	
20 January 2024	DF	(Ukraine) Artem Strilets	21	Unattached	End Contract	Free	
24 January 2024	MF	(Ukraine) Maksym Serdyuk	21	(Ukraine) Livyi Bereh Kyiv	Transfer	Free	
1 February 2024	MF	(Ukraine) Anatoliy Romanchenko	21	(Ukraine) Inhulets Petrove	Transfer	Free	

== Pre-season and friendlies ==
Win Draw Loss

7 July 2023 Friendly	Obolon Kyiv (Ukraine)	3–1	(Ukraine) Chernihiv	Kyiv
EET (UTC+02:00)	Yermolenko 60', Yermolenko 72'	Report	Serdyuk 27'

10 July 2023 Friendly	Kolos Kovalivka (Ukraine)	3–0	(Ukraine) Chernihiv	Kovalivka
EET (UTC+02:00)	Roshchynskyi 20'; Salabay 43'; Salabay 60'	Report		Stadium: Kolos Stadium

15 July 2023 Friendly	Nyva Buzova (Ukraine)	3–2	(Ukraine) Chernihiv	Buzova
EET (UTC+02:00)		Report	Koydan; Makarenko	Stadium: Buzova Arena

23 July 2023 Friendly	Chernihiv (Ukraine)	3–2	(Ukraine) Atlet Kyiv	Chernihiv
EET (UTC+02:00)	Koydan 7'; Koydan 48'; Fedosov 85'	Report	Kavun 28'; Movchan 57'	Stadium: Yunist Stadium

10 February 2024 Friendly	Livyi Bereh Kyiv (Ukraine)	2–1	(Ukraine) Chernihiv	Zolochivsk rural hromada
EET (UTC+02:00)	Kohut 26' ----- 57'	Report	Fedosov 45'	Stadium: Livyi Bereh Stadium

17 February 2024 Friendly	Livyi Bereh Kyiv (Ukraine)	2–0	(Ukraine) Chernihiv	Zolochivsk rural hromada
EET (UTC+02:00)	Hryshchenko 12'; Somov 74'	Report		Stadium: Livyi Bereh Stadium

21 February 2024 Friendly	FC Kudrivka Nyva (Ukraine)	0–0	(Ukraine) Chernihiv	Buzova
EET (UTC+02:00)		Report		Stadium: Buzova Arena

26 February 2024 Friendly	Kolos Kovalivka (Ukraine)	2–1	(Ukraine) Chernihiv	Kovalivka
EET (UTC+02:00)	Salabay 40'; Carioca		Bezghubchenko 37'	Stadium: Kolos Stadium

5 March 2024 Friendly	Mariupol (Ukraine)	2–0	(Ukraine) Chernihiv	Vinnytsia
EET (UTC+02:00)	Savin 25'; Mochevinskyi 70'	Report		Stadium: Sports Complex Nyva

8 March 2024 Friendly	Nyva Vinnytsia (Ukraine)	2–1	(Ukraine) Chernihiv	Vinnytsia
EET (UTC+02:00)	Kobtsov 75'; Petlenko 89'	Report	Shkolnyi 31'	Stadium: Sports Complex Nyva

17 March 2024 Friendly	Kudrivka (Ukraine)	1–1	(Ukraine) Chernihiv	Chernihiv
EET (UTC+02:00)	Mentey 75'		Lyegostayev 31'	Stadium: Yunist Stadium

== Competitions ==
=== Overall record ===
Competition	First match	Last match	Starting round	Record							
Competition	First match	Last match	Starting round	Pld	W	D	L	GF	GA	GD	Win %
First League	29 August 2023	17 March 2024	Matchday 1	28	6	5	17	34	66	−32	21.43
Ukrainian Cup	2 August 2023	2 August 2023		1	0	0	1	1	2	−1	0.00
Total				29	6	5	18	35	68	−33	20.69

Last updated: June 2024
Source: Results

=== Results by round ===
Round	1	2	3	4	5	6	7	8	9	10	11	12	13	14	15	16	17	18	19	20	21	22	23	24	25	26	27	28
Ground	H	H	A		A	H	A	H	H	A	A	A	H	A	A	A	H	A	H	A	H	A	H	A	H	A	H	A
Result	W	L	L		L	L	L	L	W	L	W	L	L	L	L	L	L	W	D	L	L	D	W	L	L	W	D	D
Position	1	2	6		8	9	10	10	9	7	7		8	9	10	10	10	9	9	18	18	18	17	17	17	19	19	19

Updated to match(es) played on November 2023. Source: Results
A = Away; H = Home; W = Win; D = Draw; L = Loss

=== Results ===
29 August 2023 1	Chernihiv	3–2	Dinaz Vyshhorod	Chernihiv
EEST (UTC+3)	Koydan 1'; Pinchuk (yellow card) 21'; Shumylo (yellow card) 28'; Posmashnyi 39'; Kryvoborodenko 42'	Report	Shevchenko 6'; Vorona (yellow card) 8' (yellow-red card) 11'; Solovyov 33'	Stadium: Yunist Stadium; Referee: Liudmyla Telbukh

7 August 2023 2	Chernihiv	0–2	Inhulets Petrove	Chernihiv
EEST (UTC+3)	Bybik (yellow card) 71'; Zenchenko (yellow card) 77'	Report	Sitalo 12' Kvasov (yellow card) 64'; Kvasov (penalty missed) 84; Bohunov 84'	Stadium: Yunist Stadium; Referee: Oleksandr Titov

11 August 2023 3	Livyi Bereh Kyiv	5–1	Chernihiv	Arena Livyi Bereh
EEST (UTC+3)	Voytsekhovskyi 16'; Kohut (red card) 26; Dedukh 33'; Synytsya 62'; Kohut 65'; Lytovchenko 69'; Yakymiv (yellow card) 82'; Slotyuk (yellow card) 82'; Astakhov (yellow card) 82'; Yakymiv (yellow card) 82' (yellow-red card) 84'	Report	Romanchenko (yellow card) 75'; Zenchenko (yellow card) 75' (yellow-red card) 82'; Koydan 83'(pen)	Referee: Oleksandr Afanasyev

27 August 2023 4	Chernihiv	x–x
EEST (UTC+3)		Postoponed

27 August 2023 4	Metalurh Zaporizhzhia	4–2	Chernihiv	Uman
EEST (UTC+3)	Sad 16' (p); Sad 34'; Mogylnyi 59'; Falkovskyi (yellow card) 60'; Sokol (yellow card) 66'; Halata 77'	Report	Shumylo (yellow card) 15'; Serdyuk 17'; Posmashnyi 38'; Mentey (yellow card) 44'; Serdyuk (yellow card) 62'; Halstyan (yellow card) 90+1'	Stadium: Tsentralnyi Stadion; Referee: Dmytro Osaulenko

2 September 2023 5	Chernihiv	2–3	Kremin Kremenchuk	Chernihiv
12:00 EEST	Serdiuk 4', 28'; Bybik (yellow card) 45+1'; Kryvoborodenko (yellow card) 74'	Report	Haloyan (penalty missed) 45'; Savitskyi 45'; Trofymiuk 52', 90'; Zhdanovych (yellow card) 65'; Oksenenko (yellow card) 90+4'	Stadium: Yunist Stadium; Referee: Anatolii Ukhov

2 September 2023 6	Viktoriya	2–1	Chernihiv	Yuvileiny Stadium
12:00 EEST	Myshenko 38'; Shavrin 89' (p)	Report	Fedosov 15'; Oksenenko (yellow card) 90+4'

13 September 2023 7	Chernihiv	0–1	Mariupol	Chernihiv
EEST (UTC+3)	Zenchenko (yellow card) 16'; Pinchuk (yellow card) 50'; Romanchenko (yellow card) 90+1'	Report	Chernetskyi (yellow card) 19'; Batalskyi (yellow card) 62'; Mochevinskyi 65'	Stadium: Yunist Stadium; Referee: Katerina Usova

17 September 2023 8	Chernihiv	1–0	Hirnyk Horishni Plavni	Chernihiv
EEST (UTC+3)	Shumylo 31'; Makarenko (yellow card) 54'; Bybik (yellow card) 73'; Shyray (yellow card) 87'; Shkolnyi (yellow card) 90'	Report		Stadium: Yunist Stadium; Referee: Mykyta Bohatyr

23 September 2023 9	Poltava	2–0	Chernihiv	Poltava
EEST (UTC+3)	Kotsyumaka 43'; Perebora (yellow card) 44'; Shcherbak 65' (P)	Report	Mentey (yellow card) 41'; Koydan (yellow card) 73'	Stadium: Molodizhnyi Stadium; Referee: Yehor Kevlich

30 September 2023 10	Dinaz Vyshhorod	1–2	Chernihiv	Demydiv
EEST (UTC+3)	Yarmak (yellow card) 62'; Kobzar (yellow card) 73'; Kirichenko 79'	Report	Fedosov 13'; Pinchuk (yellow card) 21'; Posmashnyi 52'; Zenchenko (yellow card) 77'; Serdyuk (yellow card) 90+6'	Stadium: Dinaz Stadium; Referee: Dmytro Osaulenko

7 October 2023 11	Inhulets Petrove	6–1	Chernihiv	Petrove
EEST (UTC+3)	Koltsov 20'; Kozak 27'; Shershen 57'; Kozak 61'; Kvasov 73'; Kvasov 84'	Report	Halstyan (yellow card) 43'; Posmashnyi (yellow card) 56'; Serdiuk 78'	Stadium: Inhulets Stadium; Referee: Vitaliy Malyar

14 October 2023 12	Chernihiv	0–3	Livyi Bereh Kyiv	Chernihiv
EEST (UTC+3)	Serdyuk (yellow card) 64'; Romanchenko (yellow card) 69'; Mentey (yellow card) 87'	Report	Sukhoruchko 37'; Spivakov (yellow card) 76'; Sukhoruchko 90+2'; Sukhoruchko 90+4'	Stadium: Yunist Stadium

22 October 2023 13	Mariupol	3–1	Chernihiv	Boryspil
EEST (UTC+3)	Tyeryekhov 18'; Batalskyi 27'; Bulgakov (yellow card) 61'; Oliynyk 73'	Report	Romanchenko (yellow card) 39'; Kryvoborodenko (yellow card) 41'; Shushko 90+3' (org)	Stadium: Kolos Stadium; Referee: Lyudmila Telbukh

28 October 2023 14	Chernihiv	1–3	Metalurh Zaporizhzhia	Chernihiv
EEST (UTC+3)	Fedosov 83' (p)	Report	Buryak 38'; Sad 38'; Falkovskyi 90+1'	Stadium: Yunist Stadium; Referee: Yevhen Tsibulko

3 November 2023 15	Kremin	2–1	Chernihiv	Kremenchuk
12:30 EST	Matus 38' (o.g.), (yellow card) 90+3'; Kireiev 61'; Azizov 71' (pen.), (yellow card) 45+2'; Panchyshyn (yellow card) 72'; Dudnyk (yellow card) 87'	Report	Fedosov (yellow card) 22'; Romanchenko (yellow card) 40' (yellow-red card) 70'; Mentey (yellow card) 65'; Serdiuk (yellow card) 86'; Roshchynskyi (yellow card) 90'; Makarenko (yellow card) 90+1'	Stadium: Kremin Arena; Referee: Yaroslav Leskiv

11 November 2023 16	Chernihiv	0–3	Viktoriya	Chernihiv
EEST (UTC+3)	Mentey (yellow card) 33'; Zenchenko (yellow card) 45+2'; Koydan (yellow card) 50'	Report	Pokotylyuk (yellow card) 16'; Mashtalir 42'; Ulyanov (yellow card) 73'; Halenko 74'; Halenko 78'; Savchenko (yellow card) 84'	Stadium: Yunist Stadium

19 November 2023 17	Hirnyk Horishni Plavni	0–2	Chernihiv	Horishni Plavni
EEST (UTC+3)	Chibueze (yellow card) 62'	Report	Myronenko (yellow card) 21'; Makarenko (yellow card) 69'; Fedosov 81'; Fedosov 89'	Stadium: Yunist Stadium; Referee: Andriy Zaytsev

24 November 2023 18	Chernihiv	2–2	Poltava	Chernihiv
EEST (UTC+3)	Bybik (yellow card) 21'; Bybik (red card) 68; Koydan 82'; Romanchenko 90+4'	Report	Kopytov 19'; Khodulya (yellow card) 23'; Opanasenko (yellow card) 25'; Shcherbak 47'; Danylenko (yellow card) 65'; Savenkov (yellow card) 81'	Stadium: Yunist Stadium; Referee: Sergey Truba

=== Relegation group results ===
23 March 2024 1	Chernihiv	2-2	Podillya Khmelnytskyi	Chernihiv
EEST (UTC+3)	Kryvoborodenko (yellow card) 28'; Shkolnyi (yellow card) 35'; Osypenko (yellow card) 42'; Mentey (yellow card) 44'; Kryvoborodenko 65'; Shkolnyi 70'; Bezghubchenko (yellow card) 84'	Report	Bozhenar 6'; Orobets 21'; Orobets (yellow card) 38'; Bozhenar (yellow card) 60'	Stadium: Yunist Stadium; Referee: Miroslav Lipko

30 March 2024 2	Bukovyna Chernivtsi	4-0	Chernihiv	Chernivtsi
EEST (UTC+3)	Romanchenko 10' (o.g.); Honcharuk 59'; Lopyryonok (yellow card) 63'; Andreychuk 69'; Andreychuk 80'; Prokopchuk (yellow card) 90+1'	Report	Zenchenko (yellow card) 11'; Zenchenko (yellow card) 28'	Stadium: Bukovyna Stadium; Attendance: 1700; Referee: Oleksandr Titov

6 April 2024 3	Chernihiv	0-2	Khust	Chernihiv
EEST (UTC+3)	Fedosov (yellow card) 17'; Koydan (yellow card) 31'; Osypenko (yellow card) 70'; Kryvoborodenko (yellow card) 85'; Khondak (red card); Mentey (yellow card) 74' (yellow-red card) 90+3'	Report	Novikov (yellow card) 52'; Shevchuk 57'; Pavlych (yellow card) 66'; Banyk (yellow card) 74'; Harnaha 82'	Stadium: Yunist Stadium; Referee: Serhiy Podrygulya

13 April 2024 4	Nyva Ternopil	0-0	Chernihiv	Ternopil
EEST (UTC+3)	Doroshenko (yellow card) 64'; Mudryi (yellow card) 71'	Report	Zenchenko (yellow card) 45+1'; Myronenko (yellow card) 73'; Veresotskyi (yellow card) 90+2'	Stadium: Ternopil Stadium

21 April 2024 5	Chernihiv	2-1	Metalist Kharkiv	Chernihiv
EEST (UTC+3)	Zenchenko (yellow card) 7'; Sakhno 21'; Fedosov 57'; Shkolnyi (yellow card) 83'; Myronenko (yellow card) 90+2'; Shumylo (yellow card) 90+4'	Report	Ryazantsev 34'; Bahachanskyi (yellow card) 43'; Porokh (yellow card) 85'; Busko90+2 Rybak (yellow card) 90+2'	Stadium: Yunist Stadium

27 April 2024 6	Podillya Khmelnytskyi	2-1	Chernihiv	Khmelnytskyi
EEST (UTC+3)	Veremiyenko 5'; Savchuk (yellow card) 44'; Pasichnik (yellow card) 56'; Kobzar 75'	Report	Koydan 26'; Myronenko (yellow card) 37'; Daniil Volskyi (yellow card) 51'; Halstyan (yellow card) 52'; Sakhno (yellow card) 73'; Veresotskyi 74	Stadium: Sport Complex Podillia; Attendance: 500; Referee: Serhiy Truba

4 May 2024 7	Chernihiv	1-5	Bukovyna Chernivtsi	Chernihiv
EEST (UTC+3)	Myronenko 31'; Bybik (yellow card) 71'; Lyanskoronskyi (yellow card) 78'	Report	Andreychuk 21'; Honcharuk 28'; Novotryasov 47'; Andreychuk 53'; Andreychuk 60'	Stadium: Yunist Stadium; Referee: Vadim Zaprutnyak

11 May 2024 8	Khust	2-4	Chernihiv	Khust
EEST (UTC+3)	Dyyanchuk 8'; Chervinskyi (yellow card) 31'; Shevchuk 43'; Vasylynets (yellow card) 50'	Report	Fedosov 3'; Shkolnyi 15'; Sakhno (yellow card) 26'; Myronenko (yellow card) 40'; Bybik (yellow card) 61'; Bezghubchenko 68'; Shkolnyi 74'; Sakhno80	Stadium: Karpaty Stadium; Referee: Yaroslav Leskiv

18 May 2024 9	Chernihiv	3-3	Nyva Ternopil	Chernihiv
EEST (UTC+3)	Fedosov 29'; Bezghubchenko 59'; Fedosov 75'	Report	Kytsun 7'; Riznyk 90+3'; Kytsun 90+4'	Stadium: Yunist Stadium

25 May 2024 10	Metalist Kharkiv	1-1	Chernihiv	Uzhhorod
EEST (UTC+3)	Synchuk 12'; Busko (yellow card) 43'; Bahachanskyi (yellow card) 86'	Report	Bybik (yellow card) 3'; Mentey 45+2'; Mentey (yellow card) 61'; Veresotskyi (yellow card) 29' (yellow-red card) 73'	Stadium: Avanhard Stadium; Attendance: 100; Referee: Yaroslav Leskiv

=== Ukrainian Cup ===
2 August 2023	Chernihiv	1-2	Livyi Bereh Kyiv	Chernihiv
EEST (UTC+3)	Koydan 19'		Lytovchenko 35'; Vakulenko 50'	Stadium: Yunist Stadium

== Statistics ==
=== Appearances and goals ===
No.	Pos	Nat	Player	Total		Ukrainian Second League		Cup		EL	
No.	Pos	Nat	Player	Apps	Goals	Apps	Goals	Apps	Goals	Apps	Goals
Goalkeepers
1	GK	(Ukraine) UKR	Oleksandr Shyray	16	0	16	0	0	0	0	0
22	GK	(Ukraine) UKR	Oleksandr Roshchynskyi	7	0	6	0	1	0	0	0
99	GK	(Ukraine) UKR	Denys Herasymenko	9	0	9	0	0	0	0	0
Defenders
2	DF	(Armenia) ARM	Eduard Halstyan	26	0	25	0	1	0	0	0
3	DF	(Ukraine) UKR	Maksym Shumylo	27	1	26	1	1	0	0	0
6	DF	(Ukraine) UKR	Andriy Veresotskyi	5	0	5	0	0	0	0	0
15	DF	(Ukraine) UKR	Andriy Lakeyenko	3	0	3	0	0	0	0	0
23	DF	(Ukraine) UKR	Oleksiy Zenchenko	25	0	24	0	1	0	0	0
5	DF	(Ukraine) UKR	Danyil Khondak	4	0	4	0	0	0	0	0
Midfielders
7	MF	(Ukraine) UKR	Dmytro Myronenko	15	1	15	1	0	0	0	0
8	MF	(Ukraine) UKR	Andriy Makarenko	9	0	9	0	0	0	0	0
9	MF	(Ukraine) UKR	Kyrylo Kryvoborodenko	26	2	25	2	1	0	0	0
10	MF	(Ukraine) UKR	Vyacheslav Koydan	27	5	26	4	1	1	0	0
13	MF	(Ukraine) UKR	Dzhilindo Bezghubchenko	24	2	23	2	1	0	0	0
14	MF	(Ukraine) UKR	Dmytro Sakhno	7	1	7	1	0	0	0	0
19	MF	(Ukraine) UKR	Nikita Posmashnyi	19	3	18	3	1	0	0	0
21	MF	(Ukraine) UKR	Vladyslav Shkolnyi	14	3	14	3	0	0	0	0
26	MF	(Ukraine) UKR	Kyrylo Pinchuk	15	0	14	0	1	0	0	0
27	MF	(Ukraine) UKR	Daniil Davydenko	5	0	5	0	0	0	0	0
30	MF	(Ukraine) UKR	Artur Bybik	26	0	25	0	1	0	0	0
31	MF	(Ukraine) UKR	Vitaliy Mentey	25	1	24	1	1	0	0	0
44	MF	(Ukraine) UKR	Bogdan Lyanskoronskyi	6	0	6	0	0	0	0	0
77	MF	(Ukraine) UKR	Daniil Volskyi	9	0	9	0	0	0	0	0
91	MF	(Ukraine) UKR	Oleh Osypenko	10	0	10	0	0	0	0	0
Forwards
11	FW	(Ukraine) UKR	Pavlo Fedosov	29	9	28	9	1	0	0	0
79	FW	(Ukraine) UKR	Roman Vovk	5	0	5	0	0	0	0	0
Players transferred out during the season
72	GK	(Ukraine) UKR	Yehor Kolomiets	0	0	0	0	0	0	0	0
5	MF	(Ukraine) UKR	Anatoly Romanchenko	16	1	15	1	1	0	0	0
17	MF	(Ukraine) UKR	Stanislav Khomych	3	0	2	0	1	0	0	0
91	MF	(Ukraine) UKR	Artem Strilets	11	0	11	0	0	0	0	0
77	MF	(Ukraine) UKR	Maksym Serdyuk	18	4	18	4	0	0	0	0

Source: Competitions

Last updated: 10 June 2024

=== Disciplinary record ===
No.	Pos	Nat	Player	First League			Ukrainian Cup			Europa League			Total		
No.	Pos	Nat	Player	Yellow card	(yellow card) (yellow-red card)	Red card	Yellow card	(yellow card) (yellow-red card)	Red card	Yellow card	(yellow card) (yellow-red card)	Red card	Yellow card	(yellow card) (yellow-red card)	Red card
23	DF	(Ukraine)	Oleksiy Zenchenko	9	2	0	0	0	0	0	0	0	9	2	1
31	MF	(Ukraine)	Vitaliy Mentey	8	2	0	0	0	0	0	0	0	8	2	0
5	MF	(Ukraine)	Anatoly Romanchenko	6	1	0	0	0	0	0	0	0	6	1	0
77	MF	(Ukraine)	Maksym Serdyuk	5	0	0	0	0	0	0	0	0	5	0	0
26	MF	(Ukraine)	Kyrylo Pinchuk	4	0	0	0	0	0	0	0	0	4	0	0
30	MF	(Ukraine)	Artur Bybik	6	0	0	0	0	0	0	0	0	6	0	0
7	MF	(Ukraine)	Dmytro Myronenko	5	0	0	0	0	0	0	0	0	5	0	0
9	MF	(Ukraine)	Kyrylo Kryvoborodenko	4	0	0	0	0	0	0	0	0	4	0	0
2	DF	(Armenia)	Eduard Halstyan	4	0	0	0	0	0	0	0	0	4	0	0
8	MF	(Ukraine)	Andriy Makarenko	3	0	0	0	0	0	0	0	0	3	0	0
10	MF	(Ukraine)	Vyacheslav Koydan	3	0	0	0	0	0	0	0	0	2	0	0
11	FW	(Ukraine)	Pavlo Fedosov	3	0	0	0	0	0	0	0	0	3	0	0
3	MF	(Ukraine)	Maksym Shumylo	3	0	1	0	0	0	0	0	0	3	0	0
21	MF	(Ukraine)	Vladyslav Shkolnyi	3	0	0	0	0	0	0	0	0	3	0	0
1	GK	(Ukraine)	Oleksandr Shyray	2	0	0	0	0	0	0	0	0	2	0	0
91	MF	(Ukraine)	Oleh Osypenko	2	0	0	0	0	0	0	0	0	2	0	0
14	DF	(Ukraine)	Dmytro Sakhno	2	0	0	0	0	0	0	0	0	2	0	0
19	MF	(Ukraine)	Nikita Posmashnyi	1	0	0	0	0	0	0	0	0	1	0	0
22	GK	(Ukraine)	Oleksandr Roshchynskyi	1	0	0	0	0	0	0	0	0	1	0	0
13	MF	(Ukraine)	Dzhilindo Bezghubchenko	1	0	0	0	0	0	0	0	0	1	0	0
6	DF	(Ukraine)	Andriy Veresotskyi	2	1	1	0	0	0	0	0	0	2	\	1
77	MF	(Ukraine)	Daniil Volskyi	1	0	0	0	0	0	0	0	0	1	0	0
44	MF	(Ukraine)	Bogdan Lyanskoronskyi	1	0	0	0	0	0	0	0	0	1	0	0
91	MF	(Ukraine)	Danyil Khondak	0	0	1	0	0	0	0	0	0	0	0	1
			Total	75	4	4	0	0	0	0	0	0	75	4	5

Last updated: 10 June 2024

=== Goalscorers ===
Rank	No.	Pos	Nat	Name	Premier League	Cup	Europa League	Total
1	11	FW	(Ukraine)	Pavlo Fedosov	9	0	0	9
2	10	MF	(Ukraine)	Vyacheslav Koydan	4	1	0	5
3	77	MF	(Ukraine)	Maksym Serdyuk	4	0	0	4
9	21	MF	(Ukraine)	Vladyslav Shkolnyi	3	0	0	3
4	19	MF	(Ukraine)	Nikita Posmashnyi	3	0	0	3
5	13	MF	(Ukraine)	Dzhilindo Bezghubchenko	2	0	0	2
5	9	MF	(Ukraine)	Kyrylo Kryvoborodenko	2	0	0	2
6	31	MF	(Ukraine)	Vitaly Mentey	2	0	0	2
7	3	DF	(Ukraine)	Maksym Shumylo	1	0	0	1
8	5	MF	(Ukraine)	Anatoliy Romanchenko	1	0	0	1
10	14	MF	(Ukraine)	Dmytro Sakhno	1	0	0	1
10	14	MF	(Ukraine)	Dmytro Myronenko	1	0	0	1
				Total	32	1	0	33

Last updated: 10 June 2024

=== Clean sheets ===
Rank	No.	Pos	Nat	Name	Premier League	Cup	Europa League	Total
1	1	GK	(Ukraine)	Oleksandr Shyray	2	0	0	2
2	1	GK	(Ukraine)	Denys Herasymenko	1	0	0	1
				Total	3	0	0	3

Last updated: 13 April 2024
