= 2024–25 FC Chernihiv season =

Football club season

Chernihiv
2024–25 season
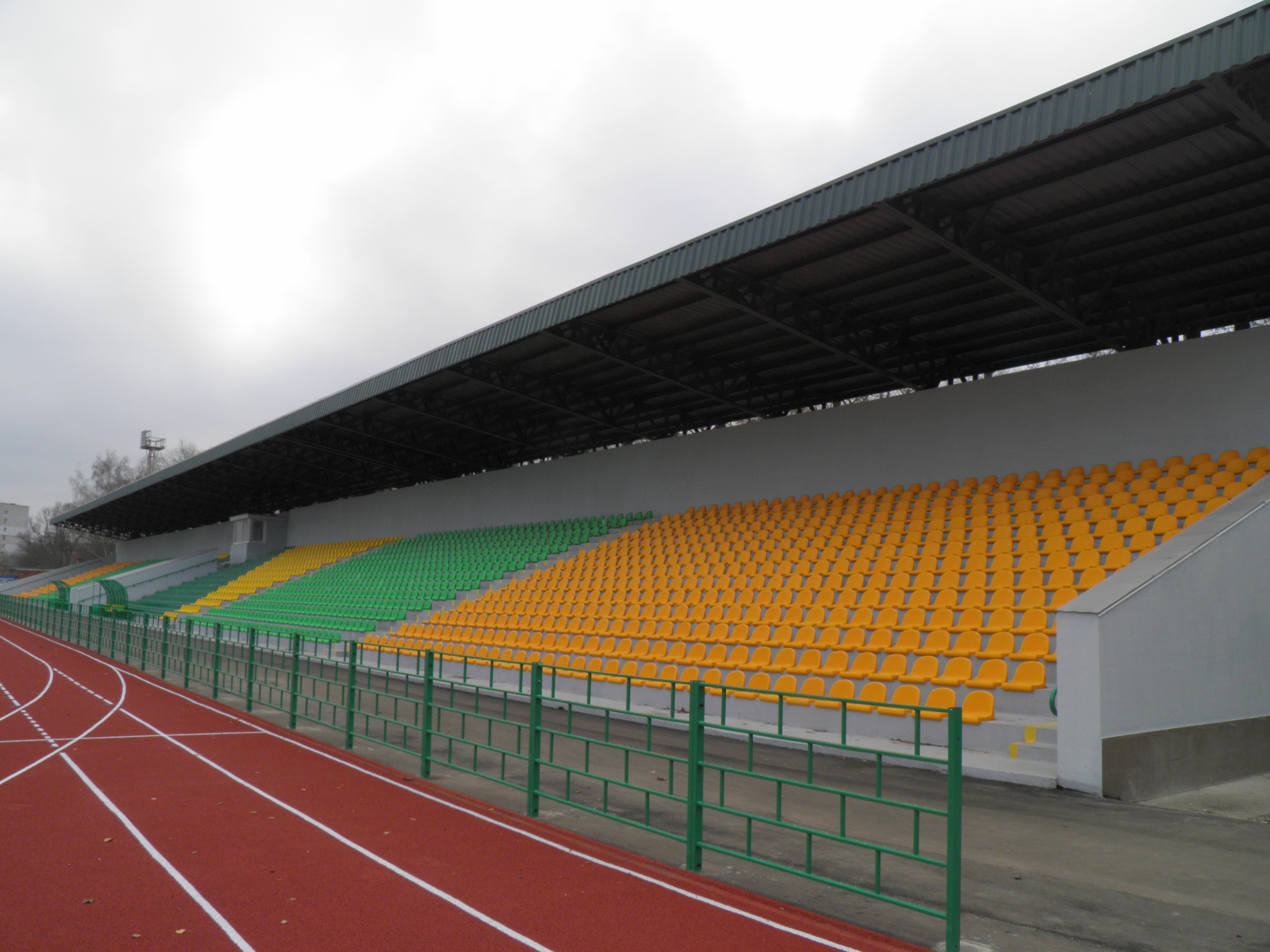
- Owner: Yuriy Synytsya
- Director: Mykola Synytsya
- Manager: Valeriy Chornyi
- Stadium: Chernihiv Arena; Yunist Stadium
- Ukrainian Second League: 2nd (promoted via play-off)
- Ukrainian Cup: Round of 64 (1/32)
- Top goalscorer: League: Vyacheslav Koydan (5); Anatoliy Romanchenko (5); All: Vyacheslav Koydan (7)
- Highest home attendance: 210 (vs Lokomotyv Kyiv, 31 August 2024)
- Biggest win: Chernihiv 8-2 Metalist 1925-2 Kharkiv
- Biggest defeat: Chernihiv 1-2 Horishni Plavni
Home colours	Away colours	Third colours

During the 2024–25 season, FC Chernihiv competed in the Ukrainian Second League. Due to damage to the Chernihiv Arena caused by the Russo-Ukrainian War, the club used the Yunist Stadium.

== Season summary ==
Having finished the previous season in 19th place, the club was relegated to the Ukrainian Second League. Several players who did not convince the club left, such as Daniil Davydenko and Roman Vovk. The club signed players such as Maksym Tatarenko, Andriy Porokhnya Anatoliy Romanchenko and Maksym Serdyuk on loan from Livyi Bereh Kyiv. In the first part of the league, the club started well, winning the first match 8–2 against Metalist 1925-2 Kharkiv and drawing the second at home against Chaika. FC Chernihiv reached the Third preliminary round of the 2024–25 Ukrainian Cup, winning against Chaika 1–0 in Yunist Stadium. On 12 August the club lost against Viktoriya Sumy 0–1 in Yunist Stadium and was knocked out of the competition. The first three games the team was leading the championship in group B, slowly the club began to lose its initial momentum and by November it was in third place. During the winter transfers, the club's management intervened by releasing some players such as Kyrylo Kryvoborodenko who had been with the club for 11 years. On 10 March, FC Chernihiv announced the signing of Yehor Kartushov from Dinaz Vyshhorod on a contract until 22 June 2025. In April 2025, the club started with two victories in Ukrainian Second League, reaching the second place in group B. On 19 April 2025, the club returned to play at the Chernihiv Arena after it had been damaged.

=== Third Place Play-Offs ===
On 30 May 2025, the club won the first leg at home against Skala Stryi at the Chernihiv Arena for 3-2. On 4 June 2025, the club won the second leg of the Play-Offs at the Sokil Stadium for 0-1.

=== Promotion Play-Offs ===
Thanks to the third place, the club earned a play-off spot against Metalurh Zaporizhzhia for Promotion to Ukrainian First League. On 8 June 2025, Chernihiv won the first leg at the Chernihiv Arena for 3-0. The won also the second leg for 0-2, on the road in both ties to return to Ukrainian First League after one year.

== Players ==
=== Squad information ===
As of 10 March 2025

Squad no.	Name	Nationality	Position	Date of birth (age)
Goalkeepers
1	Oleksandr Shyray	(Ukraine)	GK	21 February 1992 (aged 32)
22	Oleksandr Roshchynskyi	(Ukraine)	GK	30 November 2000 (aged 23)
35	Maksym Tatarenko	(Ukraine)	GK	7 May 1999 (aged 25)
99	Denys Herasymenko	(Ukraine)	GK	7 October 2005 (aged 18)
Defenders
2	Eduard Halstyan	(Ukraine) (Armenia)	DF	1 October 1998 (aged 25)
3	Maksym Shumylo	(Ukraine)	DF	31 August 2002 (aged 21)
6	Andriy Veresotskyi	(Ukraine)	DF	21 January 1992 (aged 32)
15	Andriy Lakeyenko	(Ukraine)	DF	29 September 1999 (aged 24)
20	Dmytro Fatyeyev	(Ukraine)	DF	21 June 1994 (aged 30)
23	Oleksiy Zenchenko (Captain)	(Ukraine)	DF	17 October 1996 (aged 27)
38	Pavlo Shushko	(Ukraine)	DF	7 May 2000 (aged 24)
Midfielders
6	Yehor Shalfeyev	(Ukraine)	MF	3 October 1998 (aged 25)
7	Dmytro Myronenko	(Ukraine)	MF	7 March 1996 (aged 28)
8	Andriy Makarenko	(Ukraine)	MF	13 December 1996 (aged 27)
9	Kyrylo Kryvoborodenko	(Ukraine)	MF	8 September 1996 (aged 27)
10	Vyacheslav Koydan	(Ukraine)	MF	5 July 1994 (aged 30)
12	Yehor Kartushov	(Ukraine)	MF	5 January 1991 (aged 33)
13	Dzhilindo Bezghubchenko	(Ukraine)	MF	7 February 2003 (aged 21)
14	Dmytro Sakhno	(Ukraine)	MF	7 February 2003 (aged 21)
19	Nikita Posmashnyi	(Ukraine)	MF	10 June 2003 (aged 21)
21	Vladyslav Shkolnyi	(Ukraine)	MF	14 March 1999 (aged 25)
26	Kyrylo Pinchuk	(Ukraine)	MF	16 February 1999 (aged 25)
30	Artur Bybik	(Ukraine)	MF	26 July 2001 (aged 22)
31	Vitaliy Mentey	(Ukraine)	MF	5 August 1992 (aged 31)
33	Andriy Porokhnya	(Ukraine)	MF	17 February 1997 (aged 27)
44	Bohdan Lyanskoronskyi	(Ukraine)	MF	15 October 2004 (aged 19)
55	Anatoliy Romanchenko	(Ukraine)	MF	19 May 2001 (aged 23)
97	Maksym Serdyuk	(Ukraine)	MF	21 May 2002 (aged 22)
Forwards
9	Dmytro Kulyk	(Ukraine)	FW	26 January 2001 (aged 23)
11	Pavlo Fedosov	(Ukraine)	FW	14 August 1996 (aged 27)
17	Andriy Novikov	(Ukraine)	FW	20 April 1999 (aged 25)
77	Daniil Volskyi	(Ukraine)	FW	7 July 2004 (aged 20)

== Management team ==
Position	Name	Year appointed	Last club/team
Manager	(Ukraine) Valeriy Chornyi	2021	Avanhard Koriukivka
Assistant Coach	(Ukraine) Andriy Polyanytsya	2022	SDYuShOR Desna Chernihiv
Goalkeeping Coach	(Ukraine) Artem Padun	2020	SDYuShOR Desna Chernihiv

== Transfers ==
=== In ===
Date	Pos.	Player	Age	Moving from	Type	Fee	Source
Summer
21 June 2024	GK	(Ukraine) Maksym Tatarenko	24	(Ukraine) Druzhba Myrivka	Transfer	Free	
21 June 2024	MF	(Ukraine) Andriy Porokhnya	27	(Ukraine) Druzhba Myrivka	Transfer	Free	
3 July 2024	MF	(Ukraine) Maksym Serdyuk	22	(Ukraine) Livyi Bereh Kyiv	Loan	Free	
4 July 2024	MF	(Ukraine) Anatoliy Romanchenko	23	(Ukraine) Inhulets Petrove	Transfer	Free	
Winter
22 January 2025	FW	(Ukraine) Dmytro Kulyk	23	(Ukraine) Dinaz Vyshhorod	Transfer	Free	
22 January 2025	MF	(Ukraine) Yehor Kartushov	34	(Ukraine) Dinaz Vyshhorod	Transfer	Free	
25 January 2025	MF	(Ukraine) Yehor Shalfeyev	26	(Ukraine) Mynai	Transfer	Free	
31 January 2025	FW	(Ukraine) Andriy Novikov	25	(Ukraine) Dinaz Vyshhorod	Transfer	Free	
2 March 2025	DF	(Ukraine) Dmytro Fatyeyev	30	(Ukraine) FSC Mariupol	Transfer	Free	
10 March 2025	DF	(Ukraine) Pavlo Shushko	25	(Ukraine) FSC Mariupol	Transfer	Free	

=== Out ===
Date	Pos.	Player	Age	Moving from	Type	Fee	Source
Summer
20 June 2024	MF	(Ukraine) Oleh Osypenko	22	(Ukraine) Inhulets Petrove	Loan Return	Free	
20 June 2024	MF	(Ukraine) Danyil Khondak	23	(Ukraine) Veres Rivne	Loan Return	Free	
19 July 2024	FW	(Ukraine) Daniil Davydenko	24	Unattached	End Contract	Free	
1 August 2024	FW	(Ukraine) Roman Vovk	27	Unattached	End Contract	Free	
Winter
31 November 2024	MF	(Ukraine) Bogdan Lyanskoronsky	21	Unattached	End Contract	Free	
9 December 2024	MF	(Ukraine) Andriy Makarenko	27	Unattached	End Contract	Free	
10 December 2024	MF	(Ukraine) Kyrylo Kryvoborodenko	28	Unattached	End Contract	Free	
1 January 2025	DF	(Ukraine) Andriy Veresotskyi	33	Unattached	End Contract	Free	
9 March 2025	DF	(Ukraine) Andriy Lakeyenko	25	Retired		Free	
24 March 2025	MF	(Ukraine) Kyrylo Pinchuk	26	Unattached	End Contract	Free	

== Competitions ==
=== Overall record ===
Competition	First match	Last match	Starting round	Final position	Record							
Competition	First match	Last match	Starting round	Final position	Pld	W	D	L	GF	GA	GD	Win %
Second League	9 August 2024	17 May 2025	Matchday 1	3rd	18	11	5	2	30	8	+22	61.11
Ukrainian Cup	3 August 2024	12 August 2024	Round of 64	Round of 32	2	1	0	1	1	1	+0	50.00
Second League Third Place Play-offs	30 May 2025	4 June 2025		Winners	2	2	0	0	4	2	+2	100.00
First League Promotion play-offs	8 June 2025	12 June 2025		Winners	2	2	0	0	5	0	+5	100.00
Total					24	16	5	3	40	11	+29	66.67

Source: Results

== Pre-season and friendlies ==
Win Draw Loss

6 July 2024 Friendly	Kolos U-19 (Ukraine)	1–4	(Ukraine) Chernihiv	Kyiv
EET (UTC+02:00)	Haiduk 68'	Report	Fedosov 12'; Fedosov 13'; Porokhnya 39'; Volsky 87'

9 July 2024 Friendly	Livyi Bereh Kyiv (Ukraine)	0–0	(Ukraine) Chernihiv	Kyiv
EET (UTC+02:00)		Report

16 July 2024 Friendly	Mariupol (Ukraine)	2–5	(Ukraine) Chernihiv	Kyiv
EET (UTC+02:00)	Fatyeyev 9'; Mochevinskyi 79'	Report	Myronenko 6'; Serdyuk 24'; Fedosov; Fedosov 52'; Posmashnyi 82'

23 July 2024 Friendly	Obolon Kyiv (Ukraine)	2–1	(Ukraine) Chernihiv	Kyiv
EET (UTC+02:00)	Taranukha 2'; Vyshnevskyi 81'	Report	Porokhnya 2'

23 July 2024 Friendly	UCSA (Ukraine)	2–0	(Ukraine) Chernihiv	Kyiv
EET (UTC+02:00)

26 July 2024 Friendly	Chernihiv (Ukraine)	2–0	(Ukraine) Chernihiv U19	Chernihiv
EET (UTC+02:00)

26 February 2025 Friendly	Epitsentr (Ukraine)	1–1	(Ukraine) Chernihiv	Kyiv
EET (UTC+02:00)	Demydenko 84'	Report	Romanchenko 2' (p)

2 March 2025 Friendly	UCSA Tarasivka (Ukraine)	1–1	(Ukraine) Chernihiv	Kyiv
EET (UTC+02:00)	Tatarkov 54'	Report	Novikov 13'

9 March 2025 Friendly	Denhoff Denykhivka (Ukraine)	1–2	(Ukraine) Chernihiv	Kyiv
EET (UTC+02:00)	Machulenko 24'(p)	Report	Sakhno 67'(p); Kulyk 88'

16 March 2025 Friendly	UCSA (Ukraine)	2–1	(Ukraine) Chernihiv	Buzova
EET (UTC+02:00)	Lukyanchuk 82'; Selin 90+3'	Report	Kulyk 72'	Stadium: Buzova Arena

21 March 2025 Friendly	Kudrivka (Ukraine)	1–0	(Ukraine) Chernihiv	Buzova
EET (UTC+02:00)	Potimkov 13'	Report		Stadium: Buzova Arena

26 March 2025 Friendly	Chernihiv (Ukraine)	4–0	(Ukraine) Sokil
EET (UTC+02:00)	Sakhno; Shkolnyi; Novikov; Mentey	Report

26 March 2025 Friendly	Polissya-2 Zhytomyr (Ukraine)	1–4	(Ukraine) Chernihiv
EET (UTC+02:00)	Korzh 30'	Report	Novikov 53'; Kartushov 60'; Koydan 84'

29 March 2025 Friendly	Metalist 1925-2 Kharkiv (Ukraine)	0–0	(Ukraine) Chernihiv
EET (UTC+02:00)		Report		Attendance: Serhiy Karpenko

4 April 2025 Friendly	Chernihiv (Ukraine)	0–1	(Ukraine) Chaika	Chernihiv
EET (UTC+02:00)		Report	Venger 12' (p)	Stadium: Khimik Sport Complex

23 May 2025 Friendly	Metalist 1925-2 Kharkiv (Ukraine)	0–4	(Ukraine) Chernihiv
EET (UTC+02:00)		Report	Shalfeyev 14'; Bezghubchenko 31'; Novikov 36'; Novikov 44'

=== Results by round ===
Round	1	2	3	4	5	6	7	8	9	10	11	12	13	14	15	16	17	18
Ground	H	H	A	H	A	H	A	H	A	A	A	H	A	H	A	H	A	H
Result	W	D	W	D	W	D	W	D	L	W	W	L	W	W	D	W	W	W
Position	1	1	1	2	2	2	2	2	2	2	2	3	2	2	2	2	2	2

Updated to match(es) played on April 2025. Source: Results
A = Away; H = Home; W = Win; D = Draw; L = Loss

=== Results ===
9 August 2024 1	Chernihiv	8–2	Metalist 1925-2 Kharkiv	Chernihiv
EEST (UTC+3)	Koydan 5'; Fedosov 13'; Karpizin 18' (org); Romanchenko 33'; Serdyuk 43'; Porokhnya 48'; Koydan 63'; Bezghubchenko 74'; Kryvoborodenko (yellow card) 82'	Report	Karpizin 18'; Neto (yellow card) 32'; Karpizin 54'; Karpizin 88'; Petruk (yellow card) 89'	Stadium: Yunist Stadium; Referee: Vladyslav Hrytsay

17 August 2024 2	Chernihiv	0–0	Chaika	Chernihiv
EEST (UTC+3)	Zenchenko (yellow card) 18'; Koydan (yellow card) 61'; Shumylo (yellow card) 85'; Porokhnya (yellow card) 90+5'	Report		Stadium: Yunist Stadium; Referee: Vladyslav Orendochka

25 August 2024 3	Hirnyk-Sport Horishni Plavni	1–2	Chernihiv	Horishni Plavni
EEST (UTC+3)	Dmytriyev (yellow card) 42'; Strashkevych 83'; Odoh (yellow card) 90+3'	Report	Myronenko (yellow card) 15'; Koydan (yellow card) 28'; Fedosov (yellow card) 35'; Bybik (yellow card) 45+1'; Zenchenko 57'; Romanchenko 90+1'	Stadium: Yunist Stadium; Referee: Andriy Voyevoda

31 August 2024 4	Chernihiv	1–1	Lokomotyv Kyiv	Chernihiv
EEST (UTC+3)	Bybik (yellow card) 27'; Halstyan (yellow card) 28'; Romanchenko 62'	Report	Romanchuk 29'; Kobak (yellow card) 50'; Nikolyshyn (yellow card) 53'; Zakhidnyi (yellow card) 55'; Mordas (yellow card) 65'; Dobrokhotov (yellow card) 84'	Stadium: Yunist Stadium; Attendance: 210; Referee: Oleksandr Sadovyy

7 September 2024 5	Nyva Vinnytsia	0–1	Chernihiv	Vinnytsia
EEST (UTC+3)	Vlasenko (yellow card) 25'; Boryachuk (yellow card) 58'; Khorenzhenko (yellow card) 69'; Kobtsov (yellow card) 81'	Report	Shumylo (yellow card) 27'; Mentey (yellow card) 31'; Zenchenko (yellow card) 65'; Romanchenko 88' (p)	Stadium: Tsentralnyi Stadion; Attendance: 150; Referee: Yevheniy Yevheniy

EEST (UTC+3) 6	Chernihiv	0–0	Trostianets	Chernihiv
	Zenchenko (yellow card) 33'; Bybik (yellow card) 43'; Porokhnya (yellow card) 90'	Report	Serhiychuk (yellow card) 47'; Derevynskyi (yellow card) 79'; Klyus (yellow card) 84'	Stadium: Yunist Stadium; Attendance: 150; Referee: Artem Hordynsʹkyy

23 September 2024 7	Vorskla-2 Poltava	0–1	Chernihiv	Poltava
EEST (UTC+3)	Kulakovskyi (yellow card) 34'; Tishchenko (yellow card) 38'; Ostrovskyi (yellow card) 38'; Ostrovskyi (yellow card) 38'; Izotov (yellow card) 90+4'	Report	Romanchenko (yellow card) 45'; Porokhnya 61'; Shumylo (yellow card) 77'; Tatarenko (yellow card) 90+2'	Stadium: Ltava" Poltava; Referee: Artem Ochkurenko

29 September 2024 8	Chernihiv	0–0	Oleksandriya-2	Chernihiv
EEST (UTC+3)	Zenchenko (yellow card) 14'; Sakhno (yellow card) 72'; Pinchuk (yellow card) 82'; Serdyuk (yellow card) 85'	Report	Prokopenko (yellow card) 45'; Harazha (yellow card) 58'; Shapovalov (yellow card) 69'	Stadium: Yunist Stadium; Referee: Roman Halitsyn

12 October 2024 9	Kolos-2 Kovalivka	1–0	Chernihiv	Bucha
EEST (UTC+3)	Basov 68'	Report	Sakhno (yellow card) 30'; Bezghubchenko (yellow card) 47'; Serdyuk (yellow card) 64'	Stadium: Stadium Yuvileinyi; Referee: Artem Artemenko

12 October 2024 10	Metalist 1925-2 Kharkiv	0–2	Chernihiv	Boryspil
EEST (UTC+3)	Tsubin (yellow card) 22'; Zasovitskyi (yellow card) 58'	Report	Romanchenko 18' (pen); Serdyuk (yellow card) 44'; Serdyuk 50'; Zenchenko (yellow card) 75'	Stadium: Kolos Stadium; Referee: Oksan Panʹkiv

20 October 2024 11	Chaika	0–1	Chernihiv	Makariv
EEST (UTC+3)	Sychevskyi (yellow card) 59'; Yevstratenko (yellow card) 70'; Harnaha (yellow card) 92'	Report	Koydan (yellow card) 23'; Shumylo 36'; Bybik (yellow card) 46'; Serdyuk (yellow card) 71'; Serdyuk (yellow card) 71'; Tatarenko (yellow card) 93'; Myronenko (yellow card) 94'	Stadium: Tsentralnyi Stadion; Attendance: 100; Referee: Oleksandr Sadovy

25 October 2024 12	Chernihiv	1–2	Hirnyk-Sport Horishni Plavni	Chernihiv
EEST (UTC+3)	Myronenko (yellow card) 33'; Porokhnya 36'; Porokhnya (yellow card) 45+1'; Porokhnya (yellow card) 45+1' (yellow-red card) 75' Sakhno (yellow card) 84'; Romanchenko (yellow card) 90+9'	Report	Strashkevych (yellow card) 34'; Tyapkin 42'; Studenko (yellow card) 68'; Strashkevych 69'; Sheptitskyi (yellow card) 85'	Stadium: Yunist Stadium; Attendance: 100; Referee: Artem Hordynskyi

11 April 2025 13	Lokomotyv Kyiv	0-3	Chernihiv	Kyiv
EEST (UTC+3)	Yarmak (yellow card) 42'; Nazarenko (yellow card) 72'; Bagriy (yellow card) 58'; Yesaulov (yellow card) 90+4'	Report	Romanchenko (red card) 33; Koydan 60'; Shushko 63'; Mentey (yellow card) 70'; Novikov 79'	Stadium: Bannikov Stadium; Attendance: 150; Referee: Artem Hordynsky

19 April 2025 14	Chernihiv	2-0	Nyva Vinnytsia	Chernihiv
EEST (UTC+3)	Kartushov 18'; Melnyk 19' (org); Serdyuk (yellow card) 65'; Mentey (yellow card) 71'; Shumylo (yellow card) 75'	Report	Mezhenskyi (yellow card) 10'; Mezhenskyi (yellow card) 10'; Zahorulko (yellow card) 17'	Stadium: Chernihiv Arena; Referee: Vladyslav Hrytsai

26 April 2025 15	Trostianets	0-0	Chernihiv	Chernihiv
EEST (UTC+3)	Hordiichuk (yellow card) 24' (yellow-red card) 65'; Cheglov (yellow card) 70'; Taranushych (yellow card) 80'	Report	Shushko (yellow card) 38'	Stadium: Chernihiv Arena; Attendance: 150; Referee: Rostislav Dubyna

3 May 2025 16	Chernihiv	4-0	Vorskla-2 Poltava	Chernihiv
EEST (UTC+3)	Romanchenko (yellow card) 11'; Koydan 20'; Myronenko 27'; Koydan 29'; Fatyeyev (yellow card) 32'; Shumylo (yellow card) 61'; Shushko 63'	Report	Serdyuk (yellow card) 12'; Kozintsev (yellow card) 90'	Stadium: Chernihiv Arena; Attendance: 157; Referee: Serhiy Dubykivskyi

11 May 2025 17	Oleksandriya-2	1-2	Chernihiv	Oleksandriia
EEST (UTC+3)	Radchenko (yellow card) 23'; Bazayev 62'; Bazayev (yellow card) 65'; Ukhan (yellow card) 90+2'; Prokopenko (yellow card) 79' (yellow-red card) 95'	Report	Shalfeyev 20'; Kulyk (yellow card) 31'; Romanchenko (yellow card) 35'; Kulyk 61'; Bybik (yellow card) 72'	Stadium: Olimp Stadium

17 May 2025 18	Chernihiv	2-0	Kolos-2 Kovalivka	Chernihiv
EEST (UTC+3)	Koydan (yellow card) 42'; Fatyeyev (yellow card) 43'; Novikov 65'; Novikov 67'	Report	Dymnych (yellow card) 62'; Holovkin (yellow card) 73'; Nedolya (yellow card) 89'; Kolesnyk (yellow card) 90+3'	Stadium: Chernihiv Arena; Attendance: 100; Referee: Vitaliy Solovyov

=== Third place play-offs ===
30 May 2025 1 (Third place)	Chernihiv	3-2	Skala 1911 Stryi	Chernihiv
EEST (UTC+3)	Porokhnya 21'; Koydan 30'; Romanchenko (yellow card) 37'; Shumylo (yellow card) 66'; Kulyk 90+5'	Report	Kravchenko (yellow card) 23'; Lisovyk 56'; Lisovyk 82'	Stadium: Chernihiv Arena; Attendance: 180; Referee: Anatoly Ukhov

4 June 2025 2 (Third place)	Skala 1911 Stryi	0-1	Chernihiv	Stryi
EEST (UTC+3)	Matsievskyi (yellow card) 29'; Lukyanchenko (yellow card) 63'; Yanyuk (yellow card) 66'	Report	Novikov 8'; Fatyeyev (yellow card) 29'; Serdyuk (yellow card) 52'; Koydan (yellow card) 57'; Porokhnya (yellow card) 68'; Tatarenko (yellow card) 79'	Stadium: Sokil Stadium; Referee: Andriy Zaytsev

=== The league's play-offs ===
8 June 2025 1	Chernihiv	3-0	Metalurh Zaporizhzhia	Chernihiv
EEST (UTC+3)	Shalfeyev 15'; Bezghubchenko 43'; Shalfeyev (yellow card) 47'; Romanchenko 81' (p)	Report	Yurechko (yellow card) 47'; Kostyuchenko (yellow card) 78' (yellow-red card) 81'	Stadium: Chernihiv Arena; Referee: Maksym Firsov

12 June 2025 2	Metalurh Zaporizhzhia	0-2	Chernihiv	Zaporizhzhia
EEST (UTC+3)	Yurechko (yellow card) 12'; Alibekov (yellow card) 26'; Bilyaev (yellow card) 45̟+2'; Nekhtiy (yellow card) 66'; Klymenko (yellow card) 90+1'	Report	Bybik (yellow card) 26'; Koydan 63'; Shumylo 84'	Stadium: Slavutych-Arena; Referee: Yevhen Tsybulko

=== Ukrainian Cup ===
3 August 2024 Round of 64 (1/32)	Chernihiv	1-0	Chaika	Chernihiv
EEST (UTC+3)	Fedosov 70'	Report		Stadium: Yunist Stadium

12 August 2024 Round of 64 (1/32)	Chernihiv	0-1	Viktoriya Sumy	Chernihiv
EEST (UTC+3)	Fedosov 70'	Report]	Yevpak 33'; Mashtalir (penalty missed) 58'	Stadium: Yunist Stadium; Referee: S.Podryhulya (Lutsk)

== Statistics ==
=== Appearances and goals ===
No.	Pos	Nat	Player	Total		Ukrainian Second League		Cup		Play-offs	
No.	Pos	Nat	Player	Apps	Goals	Apps	Goals	Apps	Goals	Apps	Goals
Goalkeepers
1	GK	(Ukraine) UKR	Oleksandr Shyray	0	0	0	0	0	0	0	0
22	GK	(Ukraine) UKR	Oleksandr Roshchynskyi	0	0	0	0	0	0	0	0
35	GK	(Ukraine) UKR	Maksym Tatarenko	24	0	18	0	2	0	4	0
99	GK	(Ukraine) UKR	Denys Herasymenko	0	0	0	0	0	0	0	0
Defenders
2	DF	(Armenia) ARM	Eduard Halstyan	11	0	8	0	2	0	1	0
3	DF	(Ukraine) UKR	Maksym Shumylo	21	2	16	1	1	0	4	1
20	DF	(Ukraine) UKR	Dmytro Fatyeyev	10	0	6	0	0	0	4	0
23	DF	(Ukraine) UKR	Oleksiy Zenchenko	20	0	15	0	2	0	3	0
38	DF	(Ukraine) UKR	Pavlo Shushko	9	2	6	2	0	0	3	0
Midfielders
6	MF	(Ukraine) UKR	Yehor Shalfeyev	9	2	6	1	0	0	3	1
7	MF	(Ukraine) UKR	Dmytro Myronenko	16	0	13	0	2	0	1	0
8	MF	(Ukraine) UKR	Artur Bybik	22	0	16	0	2	0	4	0
10	MF	(Ukraine) UKR	Vyacheslav Koydan	21	7	15	5	2	0	4	2
12	MF	(Ukraine) UKR	Yehor Kartushov	10	1	6	1	0	0	4	0
13	MF	(Ukraine) UKR	Dzhilindo Bezghubchenko	23	2	17	1	2	0	4	1
14	MF	(Ukraine) UKR	Dmytro Sakhno	15	0	11	0	1	0	3	0
18	MF	(Ukraine) UKR	Vitaliy Mentey	15	0	13	0	2	0	0	0
19	MF	(Ukraine) UKR	Nikita Posmashnyi	6	0	5	0	1	0	0	0
21	MF	(Ukraine) UKR	Vladyslav Shkolnyi	14	0	12	0	2	0	0	0
33	MF	(Ukraine) UKR	Andriy Porokhnya	22	3	17	2	1	0	4	1
55	MF	(Ukraine) UKR	Anatoliy Romanchenko	22	6	16	5	2	0	4	1
97	MF	(Ukraine) UKR	Maksym Serdyuk	22	2	16	2	2	0	4	0
Forwards
9	FW	(Ukraine) UKR	Dmytro Kulyk	10	2	6	1	0	0	4	1
11	FW	(Ukraine) UKR	Pavlo Fedosov	8	2	7	1	1	1	0	0
17	FW	(Ukraine) UKR	Andriy Novikov	10	4	6	3	0	0	4	1
77	FW	(Ukraine) UKR	Daniil Volskyi	8	0	7	0	1	0	0	0
Players transferred out during the season
6	DF	(Ukraine) UKR	Andriy Veresotskyi	0	0	0	0	0	0	0	0
8	MF	(Ukraine) UKR	Andriy Makarenko	0	0	0	0	0	0	0	0
9	MF	(Ukraine) UKR	Kyrylo Kryvoborodenko	5	0	5	0	0	0	0	0
16	DF	(Ukraine) UKR	Andriy Lakeyenko	1	0	1	0	0	0	0	0
26	MF	(Ukraine) UKR	Kyrylo Pinchuk	8	0	7	0	1	0	0	0
44	MF	(Ukraine) UKR	Bogdan Lyanskoronskyi	0	0	0	0	0	0	0	0

Source: Competitions

Last updated: 12 June 2025

=== Disciplinary record ===
No.	Pos	Nat	Player	Second League			Ukrainian Cup			Play-offs			Total		
No.	Pos	Nat	Player	Yellow card	(yellow card) (yellow-red card)	Red card	Yellow card	(yellow card) (yellow-red card)	Red card	Yellow card	(yellow card) (yellow-red card)	Red card	Yellow card	(yellow card) (yellow-red card)	Red card
23	DF	(Ukraine)	Oleksiy Zenchenko	5	0	0	1	0	0	0	0	0	6	0	0
30	MF	(Ukraine)	Artur Bybik	5	0	0	0	0	0	0	0	0	5	0	0
77	MF	(Ukraine)	Maksym Serdyuk	4	0	0	0	0	0	0	0	0	4	0	0
3	DF	(Ukraine)	Maksym Shumylo	4	0	0	0	0	0	1	0	0	5	0	0
10	MF	(Ukraine)	Vyacheslav Koydan	4	0	0	0	0	0	1	0	0	5	0	0
31	MF	(Ukraine)	Vitaliy Mentey	3	0	0	0	0	0	0	0	0	3	0	0
7	MF	(Ukraine)	Dmytro Myronenko	2	0	0	0	0	0	0	0	0	2	0	0
33	DF	(Ukraine)	Pavlo Shushko	2	1	0	0	0	0	0	0	0	2	1	0
55	MF	(Ukraine)	Anatoliy Romanchenko	2	0	1	1	0	0	0	0	0	3	0	1
13	MF	(Ukraine)	Dzhilindo Bezghubchenko	2	0	0	1	0	0	0	0	0	2	0	1
20	DF	(Ukraine)	Dmytro Fatyeyev	2	1	0	0	0	0	1	0	0	3	1	0
55	MF	(Ukraine)	Anatoliy Romanchenko	1	0	0	0	0	0	1	0	0	2	0	0
35	GK	(Ukraine)	Maksym Tatarenko	1	0	0	0	0	0	1	0	0	2	0	0
33	MF	(Ukraine)	Andriy Porokhnya	1	1	0	0	0	0	1	0	0	2	1	0
2	DF	(Armenia)	Eduard Halstyan	1	0	0	0	0	0	0	0	0	1	0	0
9	MF	(Ukraine)	Kyrylo Kryvoborodenko	1	0	0	1	0	0	0	0	0	1	0	0
7	MF	(Ukraine)	Dmytro Myronenko	1	0	0	0	0	0	0	0	0	1	0	0
26	MF	(Ukraine)	Kyrylo Pinchuk	1	0	0	0	0	0	0	0	0	1	0	0
14	MF	(Ukraine)	Dmytro Sakhno	1	0	0	0	0	0	0	0	0	1	0	0
9	FW	(Ukraine)	Dmytro Kulyk	1	1	0	0	0	0	0	0	0	1	1	0
3	DF	(Ukraine)	Maksym Shumylo	0	0	0	0	0	0	1	0	0	1	0	0
6	MF	(Ukraine)	Yehor Shalfeyev	0	0	0	0	0	0	1	0	0	1	0	0
8	MF	(Ukraine)	Artur Bybik	0	0	0	0	0	0	1	0	0	1	0	0
			Total	43	1	1	4	0	0	9	0	0	55	1	1

Last updated: 12 June 2025

=== Goalscorers ===
Rank	No.	Pos	Nat	Name	Second League	Cup	Play-offs	Total
21	10	MF	(Ukraine)	Vyacheslav Koydan	5	0	2	7
2	5	MF	(Ukraine)	Anatoliy Romanchenko	5	0	1	6
3	33	MF	(Ukraine)	Andriy Porokhnya	3	0	1	4
4	17	FW	(Ukraine)	Andriy Novikov	3	0	1	4
5	77	MF	(Ukraine)	Maksym Serdyuk	2	0	0	2
6	38	DF	(Ukraine)	Pavlo Shushko	2	0	0	2
7	12	FW	(Ukraine)	Pavlo Fedosov	1	1	0	2
8	9	FW	(Ukraine)	Dmytro Kulyk	1	0	1	2
10	10	MF	(Ukraine)	Dzhilindo Bezghubchenko	1	0	1	2
11	6	MF	(Ukraine)	Yehor Shalfyeyev	1	0	1	2
12	3	DF	(Ukraine)	Maksym Shumylo	1	0	1	2
13	11	MF	(Ukraine)	Yehor Kartushov	1	0	0	1
14	23	MF	(Ukraine)	Oleksiy Zenchenko	1	0	0	1
15	7	MF	(Ukraine)	Dmytro Myronenko	1	0	0	1
				Total	29	1	9	39

Last updated: 12 June 2025

=== Clean sheets ===
Rank	No.	Pos	Nat	Name	Second League	Cup	Play-offs	Total
1	35	GK	(Ukraine)	Maksym Tatarenko	12	1	3	16
				Total	12	1	3	16

Last updated: 12 June 2025
