= Dzhilindo Bezghubchenko =

Ukrainian footballer (born February 2003)

Dzhilindo Bezhubchenko
Personal information
- Date of birth: 7 February 2003 (age 23)
- Place of birth: Chernihiv, Ukraine
- Height: 1.74 m (5 ft 9 in)
- Position: Midfielder

Team information
- Current team: Chernihiv
- Number: 15

Youth career
- 2020: SDYuShOR Desna
- 2021–2022: Desna-3 Chernihiv

Senior career*
Years	Team	Apps	(Gls)
2022	Desna Chernihiv	0	(0)
2022–2023	Dinaz Vyshhorod	1	(0)
2023–	Chernihiv	82	(7)
- * Club domestic league appearances and goals as of 21 November 2026

Dzhilindo Valentynovych Bezghubchenko (Ukrainian: Джіліндо Валентинович Безгубченко; born 7 February 2003) is a Ukrainian professional footballer who plays as a midfielder for Chernihiv.

== Career ==
=== Early career ===
Bezghubchenko is a product of the Desna Chernihiv youth system. In February 2022 he was included in the main Desna Chernihiv team for winter preparation in Turkey where he also played against Torpedo Kutaisi.

=== Dinaz Vyshhorod ===
A few days later, following the Russian aggression, the Desna team disbande. On 26 August 2022, Bezghubchenko signed a professional contract with for Dinaz Vyshhorod in the Ukrainian First League. On 1 October, he made his debut for his new club against Polissya Zhytomyr, replacing Maksym Kulish.

=== FC Chernihiv ===
On 6 July 2023 Bezghubchenko signed a contract with Chernihiv, making his debut on 29 June 2023 against Dinaz Vyshhorod and scoring his first goal in the Ukrainian First League against Khust at the Karpaty Stadium at the Khust. His first season at the club was not successful and in fact the club was relegated to Ukrainian Second League and on 9 August, he scored his first goal in Ukrainian Second League against Metalist 1925-2 Kharkiv at the Yunist Stadium in Chernihiv. At the end of the Ukrainian Second League with the club he achieved third place in the competition after the Play-Offs against Skala Stryi. On 8 June 2025, he scored a goal in the first playoff match against Metalurh Zaporizhzhia at Chernihiv Arena and was elected the best player of the match. On 22 April 2026 with the club he managed to get into the final of Ukrainian Cup for the first time. On 2 May 2027 he scored against UCSA Tarasivka at the Stadion Yuvileinyi in Bucha.

On 20 May 2026, Bezghubchenko was included in the line up of the 2026 Ukrainian Cup final against Dynamo Kyiv at the Arena Lviv in Lviv, replacing Denys Bezborodko in the 58th minute. After some rumours, the contract was not renewed and Dzhilindo left FC Chernihiv after three years.

On 8 July 2026, the club Obolon Kyiv in Ukrainian Premier League showed interest by inviting him to the team. The Ukrainian midfielder failed a tryout to convince the Brewers' coaching staff of his suitability to play at the UPL level on the side of Obolon Kyiv. As a result, Bezgubchenko returned to Chernihiv and was included in the list of players under observation. Notably, Zhilindo participated in a friendly against FC Livyi Bereh Kyiv, scoring the team's only goal in that match (1-2).

On 23 July 2026, Bezghubchenko signed a two-year contract with Chernihiv. On 1 August 2026, he scored his first goal of the season against Kulykiv-Bilka at the Chernihiv Arena.

== Career statistics ==
=== Club ===
As of match played 21 November 2026

Appearances and goals by club, season and competition
Club	Season	League			Cup		Europe		Other		Total	
Club	Season	Division	Apps	Goals	Apps	Goals	Apps	Goals	Apps	Goals	Apps	Goals
Desna Chernihiv	2021–22	Ukrainian Premier League	0	0	0	0	0	0	0	0	0	0
Dinaz Vyshhorod	2022–23	Ukrainian First League	1	0	0	0	0	0	0	0	1	0
Chernihiv	2023–24	Ukrainian First League	23	2	1	0	0	0	0	0	24	2
Chernihiv	2024–25	Ukrainian Second League	17	1	1	0	0	0	3	1	21	2
Chernihiv	2025–26	Ukrainian First League	30	3	6	0	0	0	0	0	36	3
Chernihiv	2026–27	Ukrainian First League	13	1	3	1	0	0	0	0	16	2
Career total			84	7	11	1	0	0	3	1	98	9

== Honours ==
Chernihiv

- Ukrainian Cup runner-up: 2025–26

Individual

- Master of Sport of Ukraine
