= Anatoliy Romanchenko =

Ukrainian footballer

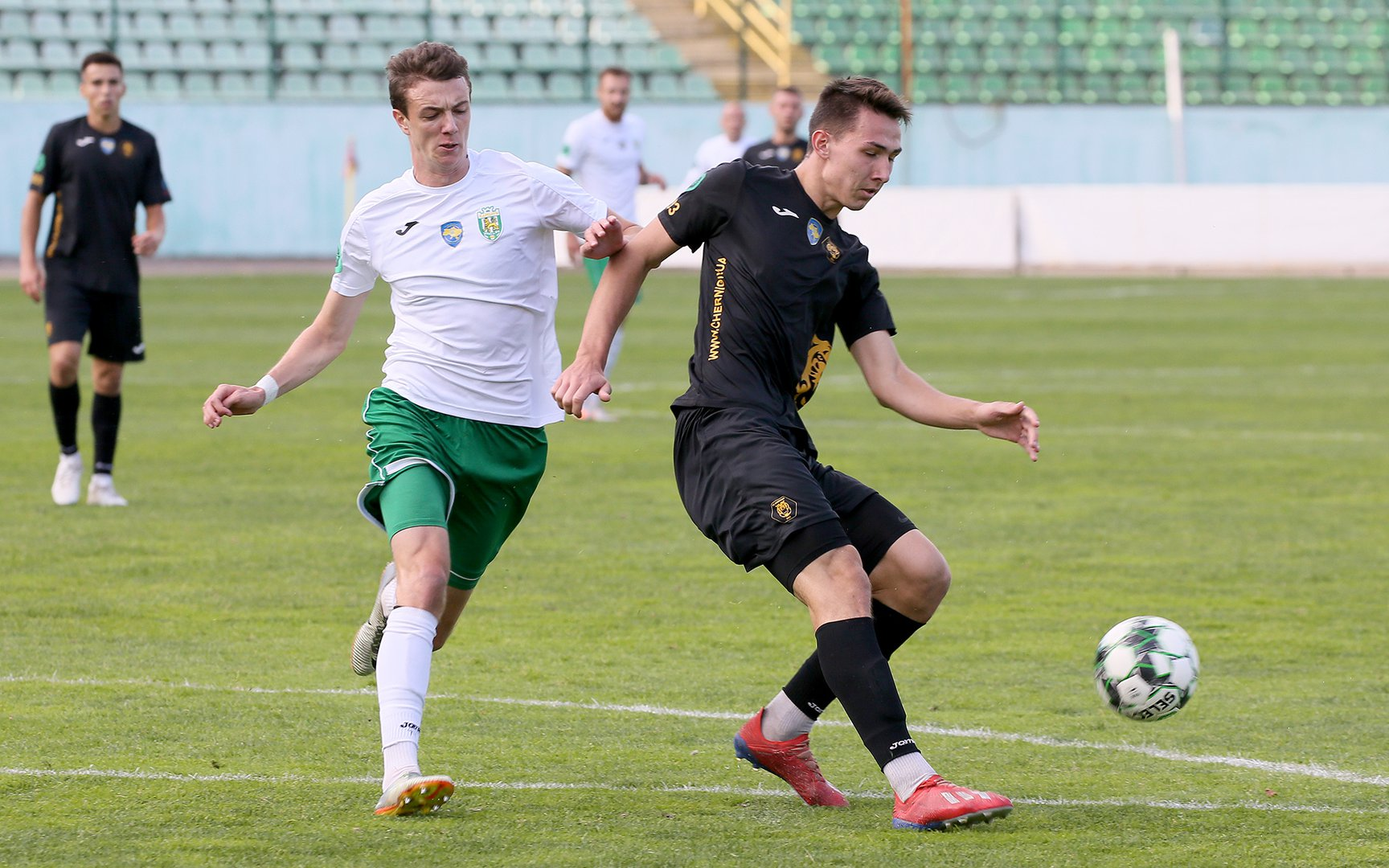

Personal information
- Full name: Anatoliy Serhiyovych Romanchenko
- Date of birth: 19 May 2001 (age 25)
- Place of birth: Mena, Ukraine
- Height: 1.87 m (6 ft 2 in)
- Position: Midfielder

Team information
- Current team: Chernihiv
- Number: 55

Youth career
- 2018: Yunist Chernihiv

Senior career*
Years	Team	Apps	(Gls)
2018–2024	Chernihiv	93	(10)
2024	Inhulets Petrove	0	(0)
2024–	Chernihiv	56	(7)
- * Club domestic league appearances and goals as of 21 November 2026

Anatoliy Serhiyovych Romanchenko (Ukrainian: Анатолій Сергійович Романченко; born 19 May 2001) is a Ukrainian professional footballer who plays as a midfielder for Chernihiv in the Ukrainian First League.

== Career ==
=== FC Chernihiv ===
In 2018 Romanchenko joined FC Chernihiv in Ukrainian Amateur Football Championship and in Chernihiv Oblast Football Federation. In 2019 with the club won the Chernihiv Oblast Football Championship in 2019. Following the promotion of the club in Ukrainian Second League, on 19 September, Romanchenko scored his first goal against Karpaty Lviv. On 4 June 2021 he scored by penalty against Chaika. On 6 June, he was included in the Best XI of Round 25 of the 2020–21 Ukrainian Second League.

=== Inhulets Petrove ===
In December 2023 he moved to Inhulets Petrove. After the promotion of the club in Ukrainian Premier League, Romanchenko was released by the club.

=== FC Chernihiv ===
In summer 2024 he returned to Chernihiv in the Ukrainian Second League. 9 August, he scored twice against Metalist 1925-2 Kharkiv at the Yunist Stadium in Chernihiv. Anatoliy ended the first part of 2024–25 season as joint-top scorer in the Ukrainian Second League of the group B with 5 goals. On 8 June 2025, he scored by penalty in the first leg of the Play-Offs against Metalurh Zaporizhzhia at the Chernihiv Arena. On 23 June 2025 he extended his contract with the club. On 23 September 2025, together with teammates Maksym Serdyuk and Artur Bybik, Anatoliy received a special jersey from FC Chernihiv for reaching 100 official appearances for the club. On 28 October 2025 he scored his first goal in the Ukrainian Cup by penalty against FC Lisne at the Chernihiv Arena. On 20 April 2026, he was included in the Best XI of Round 24 of the 2025–26 Ukrainian First League. On 9 May 2026, he scored against Chornomorets Odesa at the Chernihiv Arena.

On 20 May 2026, he played his first Ukrainian Cup final against Dynamo Kyiv, where he scored a goal and became the first player of the team to score in a cup final. On 2 July 2026, he extended his contract with the club until 2028.

== Career statistics ==
As of match played 21 November 2026

Appearances and goals by club, season and competition
Club	Season	League			Cup		Europe		Other		Total	
Club	Season	Division	Apps	Goals	Apps	Goals	Apps	Goals	Apps	Goals	Apps	Goals
Chernihiv	2019–20	Ukrainian Amateur League	19	0	0	0	0	0	0	0	19	0
Chernihiv	2020–21	Ukrainian Second League	22	2	0	0	0	0	0	0	22	2
Chernihiv	2021–22	Ukrainian Second League	17	4	2	0	0	0	0	0	19	4
Chernihiv	2022–23	Ukrainian First League	21	2	0	0	0	0	0	0	21	2
Chernihiv	2023–24	Ukrainian First League	14	1	1	0	0	0	0	0	15	1
Inhulets Petrove	2023–24	Ukrainian First League	0	0	0	0	0	0	0	0	0	0
Chernihiv	2024–25	Ukrainian Second League	16	5	2	0	0	0	4	1	22	6
Chernihiv	2025–26	Ukrainian First League	27	1	5	2	0	0	0	0	32	3
Chernihiv	2026–27	Ukrainian First League	13	1	2	0	0	0	0	0	15	1
Career total			149	16	12	2	0	0	4	0	165	19

== Honours ==
Inhulets Petrove

- Ukrainian First League: 2023–24

Chernihiv

- Chernihiv Oblast Football Championship: 2019
- Ukrainian Cup runner-up: 2025–26

Individual

- Honoured Master of Sport of Ukraine
