= Artur Bybik =

Ukrainian footballer

Personal information
- Full name: Artur Valentynovych Bybik
- Date of birth: 27 July 2001 (age 25)
- Place of birth: Chernihiv, Ukraine
- Height: 1.80 m (5 ft 11 in)
- Position: Midfielder

Team information
- Current team: Chernihiv
- Number: 8

Youth career
- 2012–2018: Yunist Chernihiv

Senior career*
Years	Team	Apps	(Gls)
2020–	Chernihiv	129	(0)
- * Club domestic league appearances and goals as of 21 November 2026

Artur Valentynovych Bybik (Ukrainian: Артур Валентинович Бибік; born 27 July 2001) is a Ukrainian professional footballer who plays as a midfielder for FC Chernihiv in the Ukrainian First League.

== Career ==
=== Early career ===
Artur Bybik was a pupil of Yunist Chernihiv, from 2012 to 2018.

=== FC Chernihiv ===
In September 2020, he moved to FC Chernihiv in Ukrainian Second League. On 17 October he made his debut with the new club against Bukovyna. On 18 August 2021 he made his debut in the Ukrainian Cup against Chaika Petropavlivska Borshchahivka, helping his team into the third preliminary round for the first time in club history. On 25 September 2022 he made his Ukrainian First League debut against LNZ Cherkasy. In 2024, Artur managed to play 2 more matches in Ukrainian Cup against Chaika and Viktoriya Sumy.

He made his contribution to get the club into the third place in the league and get promoted to Ukrainian First League. On 27 June 2025 he extended his contract with the club. On 23 September 2025, together with teammates Anatoliy Romanchenko and Maksym Serdyuk, he received a special jersey from FC Chernihiv for reaching 100 official appearances for the club. On 15 February 2026, Bybik signed a new two years contract extension with FC Chernihiv.

== Career statistics ==
=== Club ===
As of match played 21 November 2026

Appearances and goals by club, season and competition
Club	Season	League			Cup		Europe		Other		Total	
Club	Season	Division	Apps	Goals	Apps	Goals	Apps	Goals	Apps	Goals	Apps	Goals
Chernihiv	2020–21	Ukrainian Second League	19	0	0	0	0	0	0	0	19	0
Chernihiv	2021–22	Ukrainian Second League	16	0	2	0	0	0	0	0	18	0
Chernihiv	2022–23	Ukrainian First League	16	0	0	0	0	0	0	0	16	0
Chernihiv	2023–24	Ukrainian First League	25	0	1	0	0	0	0	0	26	0
Chernihiv	2024–25	Ukrainian Second League	16	0	2	0	0	0	4	0	22	0
Chernihiv	2025–26	Ukrainian First League	30	0	6	0	0	0	0	0	36	0
Chernihiv	2026–27	Ukrainian First League	7	0	1	0	0	0	0	0	8	0
Career total			129	0	12	0	0	0	4	0	144	0

== Honours ==
Chernihiv

- Ukrainian Cup runner-up: 2025–26

Individual

- Honoured Master of Sport of Ukraine
