= Yaremchuk: Matchless World of Beauty =

- Directed by: Artem Hryhoryan
- Produced by: Mariya Yaremchuk; Maksym Serdyuk
- Cinematography: Illia Mykhailus
- Edited by: Artem Hryhoryan
- Music by: Mykhailo Klymenko
- Production company: KNIFE! Films
- Distributed by: FILM.UA Distribution
- Release date: August 8, 2024
- Running time: 92 minutes
- Country: Ukraine
- Language: Ukrainian
- Budget: ₴2.5 million
- Box office: ₴15.29 million

Yaremchuk-poster

Yaremchuk: Matchless World of Beauty is a 2024 Ukrainian documentary film directed by Artem Hryhoryan and produced by Mariya Yaremchuk and Maksym Serdyuk. The film is about the Ukrainian singer Nazariy Yaremchuk.

The film narrates Yaremchuk's life and path to international fame, from winning at the "Song-71" contest with "Chervona Ruta" to his creative journey with VIA "Smerichka", to the death of Volodymyr Ivasyuk, to performances in Chornobyl. It includes testimonies from his friends and family, personal diaries, and extracts from newsreels.

The film premiered on June 23, 2024, at the film festival "Mykolaichuk OPEN" in Chernivtsi, as the closing film. The film was released in Ukrainian theaters on August 8, 2024. Over its opening weekend, it grossed ₴1.9 million. Total box office earnings exceeded ₴15.2 million (data from FILM.UA Distribution).

The film was produced by "KNIFE! Films." Theatrical distribution in Ukraine was handled by "FILM.UA Distribution".

Starting September 11, 2024, the film was available on Netflix, and from September 12, 2024, on Kyivstar TV.

During its first weekend on Netflix, the documentary Yaremchuk: Matchless World of Beauty ranked among the top three most popular films among Ukrainian users.

In September–October 2024, the documentary drama about Nazariy Yaremchuk was screened in U.S. cities under the title Yaremchuk: Matchless World of Beauty: Seattle, Chicago, Washington, Stamford, Philadelphia, Chatham, Indianapolis, Los Angeles, Brooklyn, Fairfax, and Detroit (https://www.uafilmusa.com/yaremchuk).

The film’s ratings include IMDb 8.6/10, Google users 91/100, Kyivstar TV 94/100, and kinoafisha.ua 9.7/10.

== Production history ==
The initiative to create the film came from Nazariy’s daughter, Mariya Yaremchuk. In the summer of 2021, the singer shared the idea with the producer-director duo of Maksym Serdyuk and Artem Hryhoryan (studio "KNIFE! Films"). From that point, active work began on gathering information, studying archives, finding contributors, and developing the screenplay. Interview filming started in September of that year, while location shooting in the Carpathians took place in spring 2022—after the start of the full-scale invasion.

"The idea emerged before the full-scale invasion. It was spurred by the fact that the eyewitnesses and creators of the foundations of Ukrainian-language pop music and estrada are not eternal, as harsh as that sounds… We must know our heroes by face, and now this is starting to become mainstream, which is very cool," shares Mariya Yaremchuk.

The project involved members of the iconic VIA Smerichka, including the late Lev Dutkovsky, who provided substantial commentary on Nazariy's persona. His wife, Daryna Yaremchuk, shared memories of their marriage, describing life with a romantic hero who had millions of fans worldwide. The film also includes insights and stories from his close colleagues, renowned cultural scholars, and music critics.

During production, the creators used the performer's family archives (photo albums and videotapes), archives of the film's contributors, and materials stored in the Central State Audiovisual and Electronic Archive.

The film is named after the song Matchless World of Beauty, written in autumn 1969 specifically for Nazariy Yaremchuk by composer Lev Dutkovsky and poet Anatoliy Fartushnyak. The song became Nazariy's first musical recording and was included in three albums by Nazariy and VIA "Smerichka." Alongside "Chervona Ruta" and "Vodohrai," Yaremchuk considered it one of the most significant works in his career.

=== Creative team ===
- Director: Artem Hryhoryan
- Screenwriter: Yaroslav Korotkov
- Producers: Mariya Yaremchuk, Maksym Serdyuk
- Post-production Producer: Kseniia Shubeliak
- Cinematographer: Illia Mykhailus
- Line Producer: Maksym Ishchenko
- Composer: Mykhailo Klymenko
- Sound Designer: Dmytro Oleksiuk

== Nazariy Yaremchuk ==
Nazariy Yaremchuk was a pop singer labelled the People's Artist of the Ukrainian SSR, and Hero of Ukraine. He was one of the few Ukrainian pop artists whose work gained global recognition during the Soviet era.

"Nazariy Yaremchuk was a personality who followed his own path, making Ukrainian songs fashionable across Ukraine and the world. His entire life was intertwined with pivotal events in our country. Thus, this film is also about the history of Ukraine and the music scene of the 1970s–80s. I really want as many people as possible, especially young people, to watch it and understand the legacy this artist left behind. Some things may be trendy or relevant for a certain period, but Nazariy Yaremchuk, his personality, and his music are timeless," — producer of the film Yaremchuk: Matchless World of Beauty, Maksym Serdyuk.

== Theatrical release ==
The film Yaremchuk: Matchless World of Beauty was released in Ukrainian theaters on August 8, 2024. The distributor in Ukraine was "FILM.UA Distribution". Over its opening weekend, it grossed ₴1.9 million. Total box office earnings exceeded ₴15.2 million.

== Festivals ==
Audience Film Festival "Mykolaichuk OPEN" (2024) — non-competitive program, closing film of the festival.
