= Volodymyr Sysenko =

Ukrainian football player and manager (1962–2025)

Personal information
- Full name: Volodymyr Anatoliyovych Sysenko
- Date of birth: 19 April 1962
- Place of birth: Shahrinav, Tajik SSR, USSR
- Date of death: 7 December 2025 (aged 63)
- Height: 1.81 m (5 ft 11 in)
- Position: Defender

Youth career
- 1970s: Dushanbe

Senior career*
Years	Team	Apps	(Gls)
1978–1983	Pamir Dushanbe	17	(0)
1984–1985	Dinamo Samarqand	54	(1)
1986–1989	Pamir Dushanbe	93	(0)
1990	Kuban Krasnodar	32	(0)
1991	Navbahor Namangan	42	(0)
1992–1994	Vorskla Poltava	89	(0)
1995	Kuban Krasnodar	13	(0)
1995	Okean Nakhodka	18	(0)
1996	Rubin Kazan	13	(0)
1997	Elektron Romny	1	(0)
1997	Lokomotyv Znamianka	7	(0)
1998	Zarafshon Navoiy	24	(0)
2000	Zhetysu Taldykorgan	7	(0)
Total		410	(1)

Managerial career
- 2011–2014: Poltava
- 2019–2025: Poltava
- * Club domestic league appearances and goals

Volodymyr Anatoliyovych Sysenko (Ukrainian: Володимир Анатолійович Сисенко, 19 April 1962 – 7 December 2025) was a Ukrainian football player and manager.

== Career ==
Native of a Tajikistani village near Dushanbe, Sysenko made his professional debut at the end of the 1980 Soviet First League for Pamir Dushanbe coming as a substitute in home game against Fakel Voronezh. A little more play time he was given in 1982 and 1983, but eventually he was transferred out to Dinamo Samarqand for couple of seasons that was playing a tier below. In 1986–1989, Sysenko was a regular first-squad player for his hometown Pamir and made his debut in the 1989 Soviet Top League.

Around the time of the dissolution of the Soviet Union in 1990–1994, Sysenko played for second-tier teams in the Russian Federation, Uzbekistan and Ukraine. In 1995, he returned to playing for Kuban and then moved to Nakhodka. After 1995, he played for lower-tier or amateur teams in the Russian Federation, Ukraine, and Central Asia before retiring in 2000.

In 2011, he became one of the co-founders of SC Poltava which he also managed.

== Death ==
Sysenko died on 7 December 2025, at the age of 63.
