= Illya Khodulya =

Ukrainian footballer

Personal information
- Full name: Illya Viktorovych Khodulya
- Date of birth: 16 June 1989 (age 37)
- Place of birth: Zaporizhzhia, Soviet Union (now Ukraine)
- Height: 1.87 m (6 ft 2 in)
- Position: Centre-back

Team information
- Current team: Poltava
- Number: 3

Youth career
- 2002–2003: DYuSSh Pokrov
- 2006: Metalurh Zaporizhzhia

Senior career*
Years	Team	Apps	(Gls)
2007	Avanhard Pokrov (amateurs)	16	(0)
2007	Zirka Kirovohrad (amateurs)	6	(0)
2008	Metalurh-2 Zaporizhzhia	8	(0)
2008	Avanhard Pokrov (amateurs)	0	(0)
2009	Nistru Otaci	8	(0)
2009	Dnepr Mogilev	0	(0)
2010	Hirnyk-Sport Komsomolsk	9	(0)
2010–2011	Olimpik Donetsk	14	(0)
2011	Avanhard Pokrov (amateurs)	0	(0)
2011–2012	Stal Dniprodzerzhynsk	21	(0)
2012–2015	Hirnyk Kryvyi Rih	57	(1)
2015–2017	Inhulets Petrove	17	(4)
2016–2017	→ Inhulets-2 Petrove	17	(1)
2017	Benešov	15	(1)
2017–2018	Kremin Kremenchuk	27	(1)
2018–2019	Polissya Zhytomyr	19	(0)
2019–2020	Lokomotiv Yerevan	25	(2)
2020–2021	Peremoha Dnipro	9	(0)
2021	Rubikon Kyiv	12	(0)
2021–2022	Olimpik Donetsk	12	(0)
2022–2023	Skoruk Tomakivka	4	(0)
2023–	Poltava	32	(0)
- * Club domestic league appearances and goals as of 24 December 2025

Illya Viktorovych Khodulya (Ukrainian: Ілля Вікторович Ходуля; born 16 June 1989) is a Ukrainian professional footballer who plays as a centre-back for Ukrainian club Poltava.
