= Dmytro Shcherbak =

Ukrainian footballer

Personal information
- Full name: Dmytro Ihorovych Shcherbak
- Date of birth: 8 December 1996 (age 29)
- Place of birth: Poltava, Ukraine
- Height: 1.82 m (6 ft 0 in)
- Position: Midfielder

Team information
- Current team: SC Poltava
- Number: 9

Youth career
- 2008–2011: Ivan Horpynko School Poltava
- 2012: KhHVUHK-1 Kharkiv

Senior career*
Years	Team	Apps	(Gls)
2012–2014	Poltava	?	(?)
2015–2016	Kuban Krasnodar	0	(0)
2016–2017	Anzhi Makhachkala	1	(0)
2017–2018	Olimpiyets Nizhny Novgorod	7	(0)
2019	Poltava	9	(11)
2020–2021	Vorskla Poltava	13	(1)
2021–	Poltava	83	(21)
- * Club domestic league appearances and goals as of 10 June 2025

Dmytro Ihorovych Shcherbak (Ukrainian: Дмитро Ігорович Щербак; born 8 December 1996) is a Ukrainian professional football player who plays for Poltava.

== Club career ==
He made his Russian Premier League debut for FC Anzhi Makhachkala on 5 December 2016 in a game against FC Arsenal Tula.
