= Maksym Shumylo =

Ukrainian professional footballer (born 2002)

Personal information
- Full name: Maksym Oleksandrovych Shumylo
- Date of birth: 31 August 2002 (age 24)
- Place of birth: Chernihiv, Ukraine
- Height: 1.82 m (6 ft 0 in)
- Position: Defender

Team information
- Current team: Chernihiv
- Number: 3

Youth career
- 2018–2019: RVUFK Kyiv
- 2019–2021: Desna-3 Chernihiv

Senior career*
| Years | Team | Apps | (Gls) |
| 2021– | Chernihiv | 92 | (2) |
- * Club domestic league appearances and goals as of 11 October 2026

Maksym Oleksandrovych Shumylo (Ukrainian: Максим Олександрович Шумило; born 31 August 2002) is a Ukrainian professional footballer who plays as a defender for FC Chernihiv.

== Career ==
=== Early career ===
Shumilo started his youth career with RVUFK Kyiv and then in 2019 he moved to Desna-3 Chernihiv the Desna Chernihiv's youth system.

=== FC Chernihiv ===
In summer 2021, he signed with FC Chernihiv in the Ukrainian Second League. On 24 July, he made his debut with the new club against MFA Mukacheve at Avanhard Stadium in Mukacheve, replacing Artur Bybik at the 46th minute. On 31 August 2021, he made his debut in Ukrainian Cup against Alians Lypova Dolyna at the Chernihiv Arena in Chernihiv. On 17 September 2022 he made his debuti in Ukrainian First League in the away winning match against Metalurh at the Slavutych-Arena in Zaporizhzhia 0-2. On 20 October 2024, he scored for his team against Chaika in the Ukrainian Second League giving the away victory for 0-1.

On 12 June 2025, he scored the winning goal in the second leg of Ukrainian First League promotion Play-Offs against Metalurh Zaporizhzhia at the Slavutych-Arena. He managed to help the club to secure promotion to Ukrainian First League after one year. On 26 June 2025, he extended his contract with the club.

Shumylo played FC Chernihiv's matches in the Ukrainian Cup, impressing enough helping the club to qualify for the round of 4 for the first time. On March 18, 2026, he and his team managed to reach the semi-final of the Ukrainian Cup by beating Feniks-Mariupol on penalties where Maksym scored the last penalty of the victory. Few days later, before the match of Ukrainian First League against Feniks-Mariupol at the Chernihiv Arena, he received a special jersey from FC Chernihiv for reaching 100 official appearances for the club.

On 8 April 2026, at the end of the match against Metalist Kharkiv in Uzhhorod he suffered an ankle injury, underwent surgery in Kyiv and he missed the 2026 Ukrainian Cup final against Dynamo Kyiv.

In September 2026, together with other players of FC Chernihiv, Maksym was Honoured Master of Sport of Ukraine title for the team's performance in the 2025–26 Ukrainian Cup season. On 6 October 2026, he scored his first goal in Ukrainian Cup against Trostianets at the Kuts Stadium in Trostyanets helping the club to qualify for the Round of 16.

== Career statistics ==
=== Club ===
As of match played 11 October 2026

Appearances and goals by club, season and competition
| Club | Season | League | | | Cup | | Europe | | Other | | Total | |
| Club | Season | Division | Apps | Goals | Apps | Goals | Apps | Goals | Apps | Goals | Apps | Goals |
|---|---|---|---|---|---|---|---|---|---|---|---|---|
| Chernihiv | 2021–22 | Ukrainian Second League | 16 | 0 | 1 | 0 | 0 | 0 | 0 | 0 | 17 | 0 |
| Chernihiv | 2022–23 | Ukrainian First League | 17 | 0 | 0 | 0 | 0 | 0 | 0 | 0 | 17 | 0 |
| Chernihiv | 2023–24 | Ukrainian First League | 26 | 1 | 1 | 0 | 0 | 0 | 0 | 0 | 27 | 1 |
| Chernihiv | 2024–25 | Ukrainian Second League | 16 | 1 | 2 | 0 | 0 | 0 | 4 | 1 | 22 | 2 |
| Chernihiv | 2025–26 | Ukrainian First League | 16 | 0 | 4 | 0 | 0 | 0 | 0 | 0 | 20 | 0 |
| Chernihiv | 2026–27 | Ukrainian First League | 1 | 0 | 1 | 1 | 0 | 0 | 0 | 0 | 2 | 1 |
| Career total | | | 92 | 2 | 9 | 1 | 0 | 0 | 4 | 1 | 103 | 4 |

== Honours ==
Chernihiv

- Ukrainian Cup runner-up: 2025–26

Individual

- Honoured Master of Sport of Ukraine
