= Maksym Bahachanskyi =

Ukrainian footballer (born 2002)

Personal information
- Full name: Maksym Mykhaylovych Bahachanskyi
- Date of birth: 5 June 2002 (age 24)
- Place of birth: Krasnohrad, Ukraine
- Height: 1.80 m (5 ft 11 in)
- Position: Attacking midfielder

Team information
- Current team: Metalist Kharkiv
- Number: 10

Youth career
- 2013–2015: DYuSSh Krasnohrad
- 2015: UFK-Metal Kharkiv
- 2015–2016: KDYuSSh-12 Kharkiv
- 2016–2017: UFK-Metal Kharkiv
- 2017: UFK-Olimpik Kharkiv
- 2017–2019: UFK-Metal Kharkiv
- 2019: UFK-Olimpik Kharkiv

Senior career*
Years	Team	Apps	(Gls)
2019	Kolos Krasnohrad (amateurs)	2	(2)
2020–	Metalist Kharkiv	100	(4)
2021–2022	→ Vovchansk (loan)	16	(0)
- * Club domestic league appearances and goals as of 4 June 2025

Maksym Mykhaylovych Bahachanskyi (Ukrainian: Максим Михайлович Багачанський; born 5 June 2002) is a Ukrainian professional footballer who plays as an attacking midfielder for the Ukrainian Premier League club Metalist Kharkiv.
