= Andriy Andreychuk =

Ukrainian footballer (born 2003)

Personal information
- Full name: Andriy Vasylyovych Andreychuk
- Date of birth: 17 February 2003 (age 23)
- Place of birth: Nebyliv, Ivano-Frankivsk Oblast, Ukraine
- Height: 1.87 m (6 ft 2 in)
- Position: Striker

Team information
- Current team: Gagra
- Number: 23

Youth career
- 2016: Youth Sportive School Nebyliv
- 2016–2020: Prykarpattia Ivano-Frankivsk

Senior career*
Years	Team	Apps	(Gls)
2020	Prykarpattia-Teplovyk Ivano-Frankivsk	10	(5)
2021	→ Prykarpattia-Teplovyk-2 Ivano-Frankivsk	6	(1)
2021	Prykarpattia Ivano-Frankivsk	6	(0)
2021–2024	Oleksandriya	9	(0)
2024	→ Bukovyna Chernivtsi (loan)	10	(6)
2024–2025	Bukovyna Chernivtsi	31	(3)
2026–	Gagra	19	(4)
- * Club domestic league appearances and goals as of 10 July 2026

Andriy Vasylyovych Andreychuk (Ukrainian: Андрій Васильович Андрейчук; born 17 February 2003) is a Ukrainian footballer who plays as a striker for Bukovyna Chernivtsi.

== Career ==
Born on 17 February 2003, in then Rozhniativ Raion, Andreychuk is a product of the local Nebyliv youth sportive school and Prykarpattia Ivano-Frankivsk youth sportive system.

After spent career in the teams of amateur or lower level, after a short trial period, in July 2021, he signed a deal with the Ukrainian Premier League club FC Oleksandriya and made his debut for this side as the second half-time substituted player in the away winning match against SC Tavriya Simferopol on 22 September 2021 in the Round of 32 of the Ukrainian Cup.
