= Artur Petlenko =

Ukrainian footballer

Personal information
- Full name: Artur Yuriyovych Petlenko
- Date of birth: 16 July 2004 (age 22)
- Place of birth: Sumy, Ukraine
- Position: Left midfielder

Team information
- Current team: Nyva Vinnytsia
- Number: 11

Youth career
- 2016–: Barsa Sumy

Senior career*
| Years | Team | Apps | (Gls) |
| 2020–2021 | Alians-2 Lypova Dolyna (amateurs) | 9 | (1) |
| 2021 | Ukraina Tokari (amateurs) | 0 | (0) |
| 2021 | Alians Lypova Dolyna | 1 | (0) |
| 2023– | Nyva Vinnytsia | 70 | (10) |
- * Club domestic league appearances and goals as of 4 June 2026

Artur Yuriyovych Petlenko (Ukrainian: Артур Юрійович Петленко; born 16 July 2004) is a Ukrainian professional footballer who plays as a left midfielder for Ukrainian club Nyva Vinnytsia.
