= Bohdan Kobzar =

Ukrainian footballer

Personal information
- Full name: Bohdan Mykhaylovych Kobzar
- Date of birth: 22 April 2002 (age 24)
- Place of birth: Rozhyshche, Ukraine
- Height: 1.85 m (6 ft 1 in)
- Position: Centre-forward

Team information
- Current team: Poltava
- Number: 93

Youth career
- 2013–2014: DYuSSh Rozhyshche
- 2014–2019: Volyn Lutsk

Senior career*
Years	Team	Apps	(Gls)
2018–2022	Volyn Lutsk	40	(9)
2020–2021	→ Volyn-2 Lutsk	16	(1)
2022–2024	Oleksandriya	20	(1)
2023	→ Dinaz Vyshhorod (loan)	10	(0)
2024	→ Podillya Khmelnytskyi (loan)	9	(4)
2024	Oleksandriya-2	2	(0)
2024–2025	Livyi Bereh Kyiv	14	(0)
2025–	Poltava	11	(1)
- * Club domestic league appearances and goals as of 3 June 2026

Bohdan Mykhaylovych Kobzar (Ukrainian: Богдан Михайлович Кобзар; born 22 April 2002) is a Ukrainian professional footballer who plays as a centre-forward for Ukrainian club Poltava.

== Club career ==
On 4 September 2024, Kobzar moved to Livyi Bereh Kyiv.
