= Sports Complex Nyva =

Football stadium in Vinnytsia, Ukraine

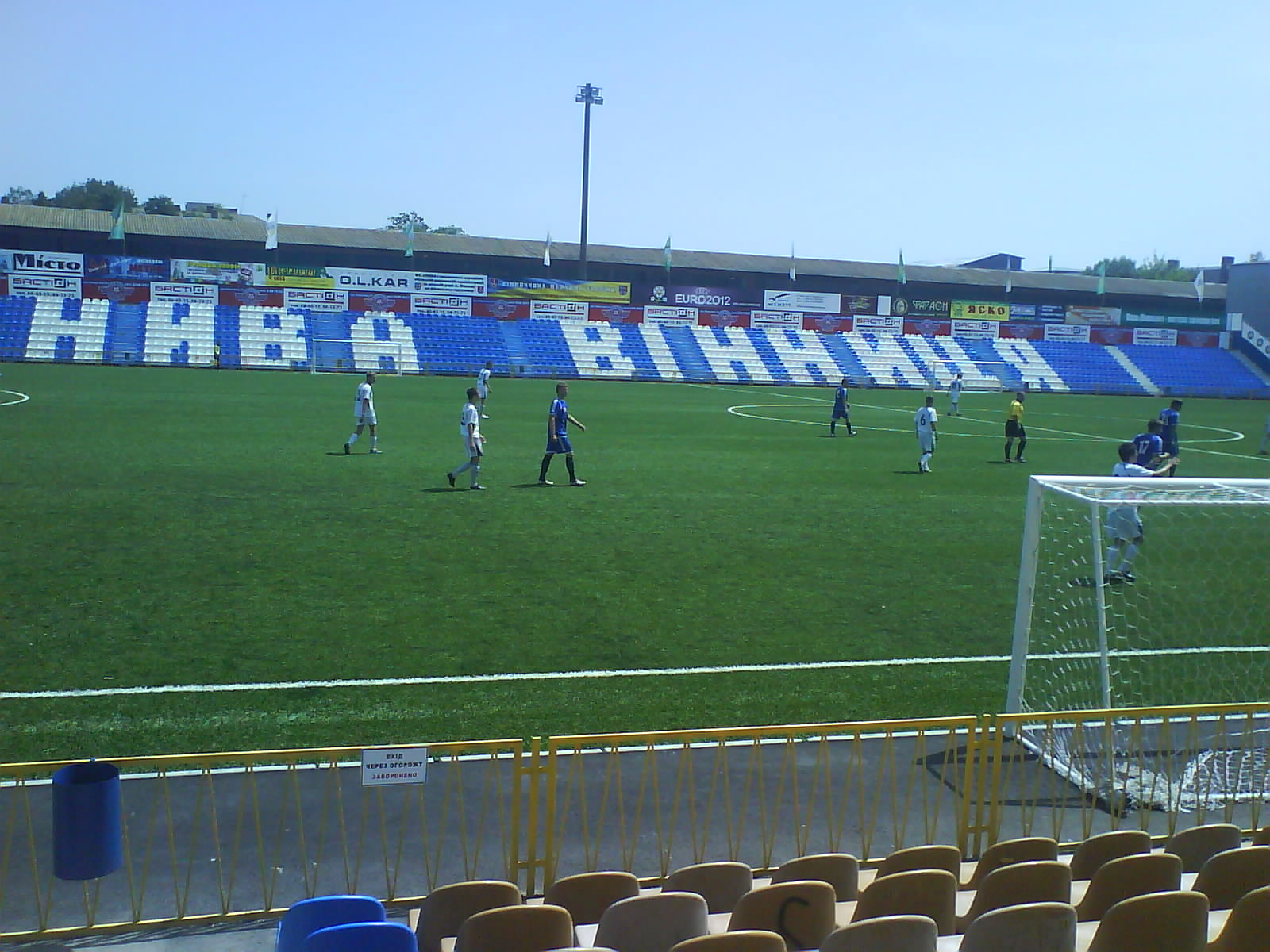

Sports Complex SC Nyva (Ukrainian: Спортивна база СК Нива, Sportyvna baza SK Nyva) is a football only stadium in Vinnytsia, Ukraine. The complex was opened on 9 May 2010 and owned by FC Nyva Vinnytsia. The stadium is located near Khimik city park.

== Description ==
Aside from the main pitch, it has two mini fields (20 x 40 meters), a covered sports hall and pool, an administrative building with offices and conference hall, a three-story building which includes a small hotel for footballers (20 rooms), changing and shower rooms, a room for referees, journalists, and VIP lodges, a fitness hall, and the club's souvenir store. There is also a restaurant, a summer café, a fan bar, a children's playground, parking for over 100 cars, and more.

=== Main arena ===
The turf field is composed of a fifth-generation artificial turf, 105 x 68 meters. There are six floodlight towers with a total luminosity of 1,200 lux and an electronic score stand.

The total seat capacity is 3,282 seats, including the "sunny" stand with 1,512 seats, the "shady" stand with 918 seats, and an additional 852 seats behind both goalposts.

=== Historic background ===
Previously, the stadium belonged to the Vinnytsia chemical factory, a team of which, "Khimik", competed at regional competitions.
