= Valeriy Sad =

Ukrainian footballer

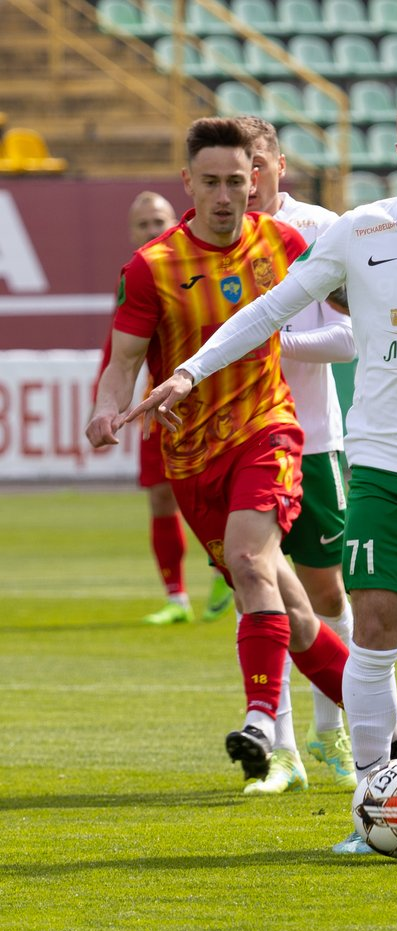

Personal information
- Full name: Valeriy Valeryanovych Sad
- Date of birth: 18 December 1998 (age 27)
- Place of birth: Kuznetsovsk, Ukraine
- Height: 1.78 m (5 ft 10 in)
- Position: Midfielder

Team information
- Current team: SC Poltava
- Number: 10

Youth career
- 2011–2015: Skala Stryi

Senior career*
Years	Team	Apps	(Gls)
2015–2018	Skala Stryi	26	(4)
2017	→ Partizán Bardejov (loan)	1	(0)
2018–2019	Veres Rivne	40	(0)
2020	Bukovyna Chernivtsi	0	(0)
2020	Volyn Lutsk	9	(2)
2020–2021	Prykarpattia Ivano-Frankivsk	6	(0)
2021–2022	Volyn Lutsk	11	(1)
2022–2023	Metalurh Zaporizhzhia	40	(11)
2024–2026	Inhulets Petrove	47	(2)
2026–	SC Poltava	8	(2)
- * Club domestic league appearances and goals as of 31 May 2026

Valeriy Valeryanovych Sad (Ukrainian: Валерій Валер'янович Сад; born 18 December 1998) is a Ukrainian professional footballer who plays as a midfielder for Ukrainian club SC Poltava.

== Honours ==
Inhulets Petrove

- Ukrainian First League: 2023–24
