= Maksym Yermolenko =

Ukrainian footballer

Personal information
- Full name: Maksym Andriyovych Yermolenko
- Date of birth: 14 May 1998 (age 28)
- Place of birth: Kharkiv, Ukraine
- Height: 1.90 m (6 ft 3 in)
- Position: Centre-forward

Youth career
- 2011–2015: Metalist Kharkiv

Senior career*
Years	Team	Apps	(Gls)
2015	Status Kehychivka (amateurs)	6	(0)
2015–2016	Metalist Kharkiv	0	(0)
2016–2017	Metalist 1925 Kharkiv (amateurs)	13	(3)
2017	Zmiiv (amateurs)	9	(13)
2018–2020	Metalist 1925 Kharkiv	33	(6)
2021–2022	Kramatorsk	24	(5)
2022–2023	Chornomorets Odesa	0	(0)
2022–2023	→ Obolon Kyiv (loan)	12	(0)
2023	Obolon Kyiv	0	(0)
- * Club domestic league appearances and goals as of 2 September 2024

Maksym Andriyovych Yermolenko (Ukrainian: Максим Андрійович Єрмоленко; born 14 May 1998) is a Ukrainian professional footballer who plays as a centre-forward.
