= Danylo Falkovskyi =

Ukrainian footballer (born 1999)

Personal information
- Full name: Danylo Serhiiovych Falkovskyi
- Date of birth: 21 May 1999 (age 27)
- Place of birth: Kropyvnytskyi, Ukraine
- Height: 1.91 m (6 ft 3 in)
- Position: Midfielder

Youth career
- 2012-2016: Zirka Kropyvnytsky
- 2018-2021: Olimpik Kropyvnytskyi

Senior career*
Years	Team	Apps	(Gls)
2021–2022	Zirka Kropyvnytsky	0	(0)
2018–2019	Krystal Chortkiv	20	(4)
2019–2021	Mykolaiv	17	(3)
2019–2021	→ Mykolaiv-2	44	(5)
2022–2023	Kremin Kremenchuk	22	(3)
2023–2025	Metalurh Zaporizhzhia	34	(4)
2024	→ Nyva Buzova (loan)	8	(1)
2025	Podillya Khmelnytskyi	1	(0)
- * Club domestic league appearances and goals as of 27 December 2025

Danylo Serhiiovych Falkovskyi (Ukrainian: Данило Сергійович Фальковський; born 21 May 1999) is a Ukrainian professional footballer who played as a midfielder for Ukrainian club Podillya Khmelnytskyi.

== Career ==
He signed with Kremin on 24 August 2022 for a two-year contract.

=== Metalurh Zaporizhzhia ===
Falkovskyi moved to Metalurh Zaporizhzhia on 10 July 2023. Two years later, Falkovskyi left the club after making twenty-one appearance for the club. In those matches he scored two goals and provided one assist.

=== Podillya Khmelnytskyi ===
Falkovskyi joined the Ukrainian First League side Podillya Khmelnytskyi in July 2025. He took the number 8 shirt. He made two appearances for the club. One in the League and another in the Ukrainian cup on 23 August against Skala 1911. Falkovskyi left Podillya during December 2025.
