= Molodizhnyi Stadium =

Stadium in Poltava, Ukraine

- Стадіон Молодіжний
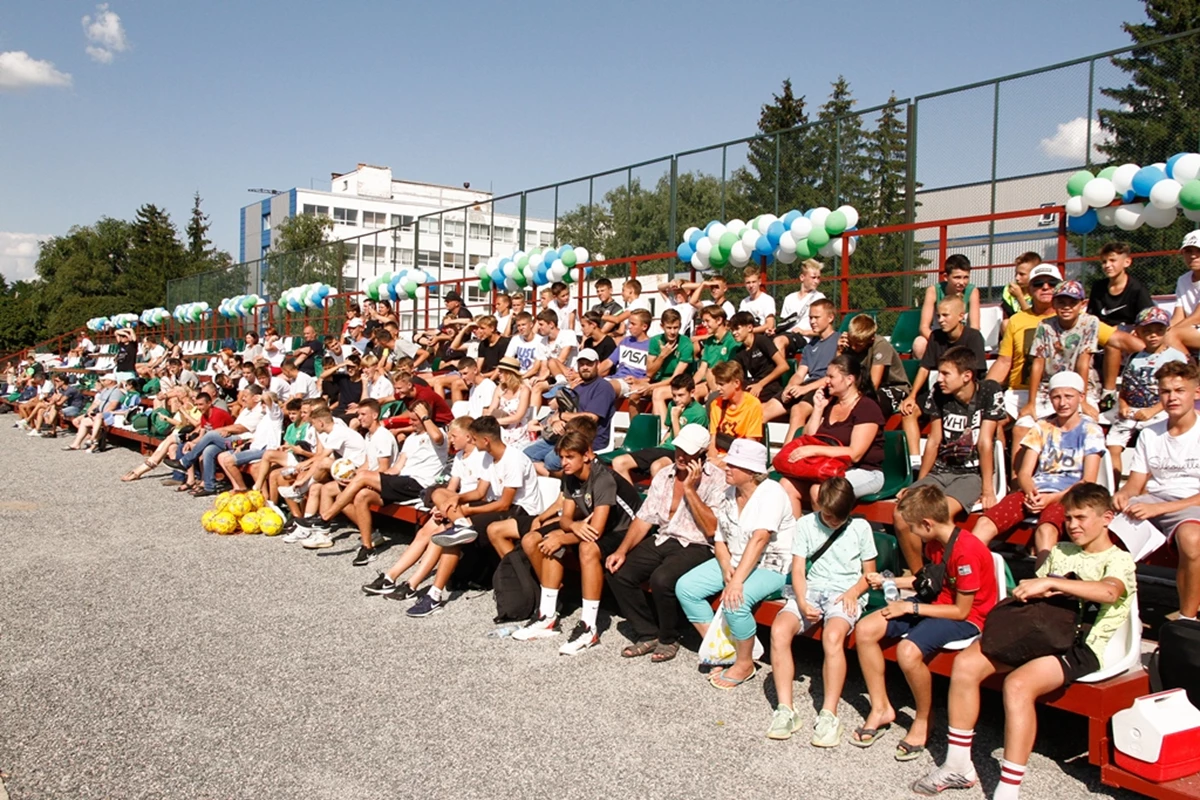
- Interactive map of Molodizhnyi Stadium
- Location: Zinkivska Street, 57 Poltava, Ukraine
- Coordinates: 49°37′28.6″N 34°31′58.9″E
- Owner: Vorskla Poltava
- Capacity: 680
- Surface: Artificial
- Field size: 105 m × 68 m (344 ft × 223 ft)

Construction
- Built: 2021
- Opened: 26 July 2021; 5 years ago

Tenants
- SC Poltava (2022–present); Vorskla Poltava (women) (2021–present)

Molodizhnyi Stadium (Ukrainian: Стадіон Молодіжний) is a football stadium in Poltava, Ukraine. It is the home stadium of SC Poltava, Vorskla Poltava (women) and various regional teams.

Stadium was built in 2021 on territory of the Poltava automobile unit plant. Land for the stadium was gifted by KrAZ and project was financed by Ferrexpo. Stadium has artificial turf made by "JUTAgrass" a Czech turf manufacturer. Opening ceremony was held on 26 July 2021.
