= Anton Salabay =

Ukrainian footballer

Personal information
- Full name: Anton Oleksandrovych Salabay
- Date of birth: 12 June 2002 (age 24)
- Place of birth: Kyiv, Ukraine
- Height: 1.87 m (6 ft 1 1/2 in)
- Position: Midfielder

Team information
- Current team: Kolos Kovalivka
- Number: 17

Youth career
- 2016: Zmina-Obolon Kyiv
- 2016–2017: Troyeshchyna Kyiv
- 2017–2018: Favoryt Boryspil
- 2018–2019: Kolos Kovalivka

Senior career*
Years	Team	Apps	(Gls)
2019–	Kolos Kovalivka	55	(6)
2022–2023	→ Dinaz Vyshhorod (loan)	15	(2)
2025	→ Vorskla Poltava (loan)	10	(0)
- * Club domestic league appearances and goals as of 3 June 2026

Anton Salabay (Ukrainian: Антон Олександрович Салабай; born 12 June 2002) is a Ukrainian professional footballer who plays as a midfielder for Kolos Kovalivka.

== Career ==
Salabay is a product of the different youth sportive school systems from Kyiv and Kyiv Oblast and competed for these teams in the Ukrainian Youth Football League.

In August 2019, he joined the main-squad of a newly promoted Ukrainian Premier League side FC Kolos Kovalivka and made his debut for its in the home losing match against FC Dynamo Kyiv on 9 May 2021 in the Ukrainian Premier League as a second half-time substituted player.
