= Vladyslav Ostrovskyi =

Ukrainian footballer

Personal information
- Full name: Vladyslav Serhiyovych Ostrovskyi
- Date of birth: 13 September 2004 (age 22)
- Place of birth: Kharkiv, Ukraine
- Height: 1.85 m (6 ft 1 in)
- Position: Striker

Team information
- Current team: Vorskla Poltava
- Number: 43

Youth career
- 2017–2018: Zirka Kyiv
- 2018–2021: Youth Sportive School #26 Kyiv

Senior career*
| Years | Team | Apps | (Gls) |
| 2021–2023 | Metalist 1925 Kharkiv | 10 | (0) |
| 2022 | → Lugo (loan) | 0 | (0) |
| 2023– | Vorskla Poltava | 15 | (0) |
- * Club domestic league appearances and goals as of 14 June 2025

Vladyslav Serhiyovych Ostrovskyi (Ukrainian: Владислав Сергійович Островський; born 13 September 2004) is a Ukrainian professional footballer who plays as a striker for Vorskla Poltava.

== Career ==
Ostrovskyi is a product of the Zirka and #26 youth sportive school systems from Kyiv.

He signed a contract with the Ukrainian Premier League side Metalist 1925 Kharkiv in July 2021 and made his debut in the Ukrainian Premier League for Metalist 1925 as a second half-time substituted player in a losing away match against Chornomorets Odesa on 12 December 2021.

His contract was terminated due to 2022 Russian invasion of Ukraine and on 10 April 2022 he moved to Spanish Segunda División club CD Lugo.
