= Serhiy Mashtalir =

Ukrainian footballer

Personal information
- Full name: Serhiy Serhiyovych Mashtalir
- Date of birth: 20 August 1998 (age 28)
- Place of birth: Uzhhorod, Ukraine
- Height: 1.79 m (5 ft 10 in)
- Position: Attacking midfielder

Team information
- Current team: Mariupol
- Number: 77

Youth career
- 2011–2015: SDYuSShOR Uzhhorod

Senior career*
| Years | Team | Apps | (Gls) |
| 2015 | Serednye | | |
| 2015–2016 | Hoverla Uzhhorod | 0 | (0) |
| 2016 | Serednye | | |
| 2016 | Spartakus Uzhhorod | 22 | (0) |
| 2017–2018 | Mynai | 24 | (9) |
| 2018 | Serednye | | |
| 2018–2020 | Uzhhorod | 52 | (20) |
| 2020–2021 | Mynai | 6 | (1) |
| 2020–2021 | → Uzhhorod (loan) | 19 | (3) |
| 2021–2022 | Uzhhorod | 10 | (0) |
| 2022–2023 | Obolon Kyiv | 5 | (0) |
| 2023–2024 | Viktoriya Sumy | 34 | (2) |
| 2025– | Mariupol | 6 | (0) |
- * Club domestic league appearances and goals as of 10 June 2025

Serhiy Serhiyovych Mashtalir (Ukrainian: Сергій Сергійович Машталір; born 20 August 1998) is a Ukrainian professional footballer who plays as an attacking midfielder for Ukrainian club Mariupol.
