= SC Poltava =

- Full name: Sport Club Poltava
- Founded: 2011; 15 years ago
- Ground: Molodizhnyi Stadium, Poltava
- Capacity: 680
- Chairman: Serhiy Ivashchenko
- Manager: Pavlo Matviychenko (caretaker)
- League: Ukrainian First League
- 2025–26: Ukrainian Premier League, 16th of 16 (relegated)
- Website: https://scpoltava.com/
Home colours	Away colours	Third colours

Sport Club Poltava (Ukrainian: Спортивний клуб «Полтава») is a professional Ukrainian football club from the city of Poltava. The club will play in the Ukrainian First League in 2026-27, following relegation from the Ukrainian Premier League.

== History ==
The team was founded in 2011 by two football enthusiasts, a veteran of FC Vorskla Poltava Volodymyr Sysenko and a local journalist Stanislav Maizus. The first team was based on students out of schools of the Poltava's Levada neighborhood. Before 2014, it played in regional competitions of Poltava Oblast, remaining in the shadow of FC Poltava, which at that time competed at the Ukrainian Second League. SC Poltava played its home games at the FC Poltava training base in Kopyly. In 2014 SC Poltava became a champion of Poltava Oblast, but ceased its existence due to lack of funding. It was the first title for Poltava-based teams at competitions in Poltava Oblast in 19 years. In 2014 several professional footballers played for the club, including Yuriy Fomenko and Ruslan Solyanyk.

In 2019, Sysenko and Maizus managed to invite construction company owner Serhiy Ivashchenko who became the club's president, providing necessary funding. In 2019–20 SC Poltava entered the AAFU cup competitions and in 2020–21 debuted at the AAFU championship. The club was placed 5th within its group in its first national season. SC Poltava was admitted to the Professional Football League of Ukraine and entered the 2021–22 Ukrainian Second League competition. In 2024–25, SC Poltava secured promotion to the Ukrainian Premier League for the first time in their history. They were relegated in from the Ukrainian Premier League in 2025-26.

== Players ==
=== Current squad ===
As of 8 September 2026

Note: Flags indicate national team as defined under FIFA eligibility rules; some limited exceptions apply. Players may hold more than one non-FIFA nationality.

No.	Pos.	Nation	Player
1	GK	UKR	Mykyta Minchev
2	DF	UKR	Mykyta Kononov
5	DF	UKR	Vadym Pidlepych
7	MF	UKR	Denys Halenkov
8	FW	UKR	Volodymyr Odaryuk
9	FW	UKR	Dmytro Shcherbak
10	MF	UKR	Valeriy Sad
11	MF	UKR	Dmytro Kasimov
13	DF	UKR	Andriy Savenkov
15	MF	UKR	Vladyslav Danylenko
17	FW	UKR	Bohdan Kobzar

No.	Pos.	Nation	Player
19	DF	UKR	Mykola Buzhyn
20	MF	UKR	Nikita Krokhmal
21	MF	UKR	Yuriy Tlumak
22	MF	UKR	Dmytro Prikhna
27	DF	UKR	Danylo Serbinov
28	MF	UKR	Davyd Blahodarnyi
33	DF	UKR	Oleh Veremiyenko
88	FW	UKR	Oleksandr Vivdych
95	DF	UKR	Ihor Kotsyumaka
96	GK	UKR	Daniil Yermolov
97	MF	UKR	Suleyman Seytkhalilov

== League and cup history ==
Season	Div.	Pos.	Pl.	W	D	L	GS	GA	P	Domestic Cup	Europe		Notes
2020–21	4th	5	22	14	4	4	51	20	46	-	-	-	Promoted
2021–22	3rd	6	20	9	4	7	29	27	31	First preliminary round (1/128)	-	-	Promoted
2022–23	2nd	6_{/8}	14	4	3	7	15	19	15	-	-	-	to Relegation group
2022–23	2nd	14_{/16}	14	4	4	6	16	22	16	-	-	-	
2023–24	2nd	5_{/10}	18	8	5	5	35	27	29	Second preliminary round (1/64)	-	-	to Promotion group
2023–24	2nd	10_{/10}	28	10	7	11	49	45	37	Second preliminary round (1/64)	-	-	
2024–25	2nd	3_{/9}	16	8	5	3	24	14	29	Second preliminary round (1/64)	-	-	to Promotion group
2024–25	2nd	2_{/8}	22	12	5	5	31	19	41	Second preliminary round (1/64)	-	-	Promotion to Ukrainian Premier League
2025–26	1st	16_{/16}	29	2	6	21	23	74	12	Round of 32 (1/16)	-	-	Relegated to Ukrainian First League
2026–27	2nd	3_{/16}	10	5	3	2	16	7	18	Round of 64 (1/32)	-	-	TBD

== Non-playing personnel ==
=== Presidents ===
- 2011–2014 Stanislav Maizus
- 2019– Serhiy Ivashchenko

=== Managers ===
- 2011–2014 Volodymyr Sysenko
- 2019– Volodymyr Sysenko

== Honours ==
- Poltava Oblast championship
  - Winners (1): 2014
- Ukrainian First League
  - Runners-up (1): 2024–25

== Reserves ==
In 2026, SC Poltava created their own second team, Poltava-2 to compete in the 2026–27 Ukrainian Second League.
