= Kharkiv State College of Physical Culture 1 =

Sports college in Kharkiv, Ukraine

Kharkiv State College of Physical Culture 1 (Ukrainian: Харківське державне вище училище фізичної культури № 1, ХДВУФК) is a sports college in Kharkiv and is subordinated to the Ministry of Education and Science of Ukraine. Note that in Kharkiv are two colleges of Physical Culture, one belongs to the Kharkiv Oblast, another is administered directly by the Government of Ukraine through the Ministry of Sports.

== Departments ==
- Cycling
- Rowing
- Wrestling, free style
- Water polo
- Volleyball
  - Lokomotyv-KhDVUFK (participates in the second division of Ukrainian competition as a farm club of Lokomotyv Kharkiv)
- Judo
- Athletics
- Track and field
- Swimming
- Swimming, synchronized
- Archery
- Taekwondo (WTF)
- Football
  - UFK Olimpik

== See also ==
- National University of Physical Education and Sport of Ukraine
- FC Olympik Kharkiv
