= Karpaty Stadium =

Stadium in Khust, Ukraine

- Стадіон Карпати
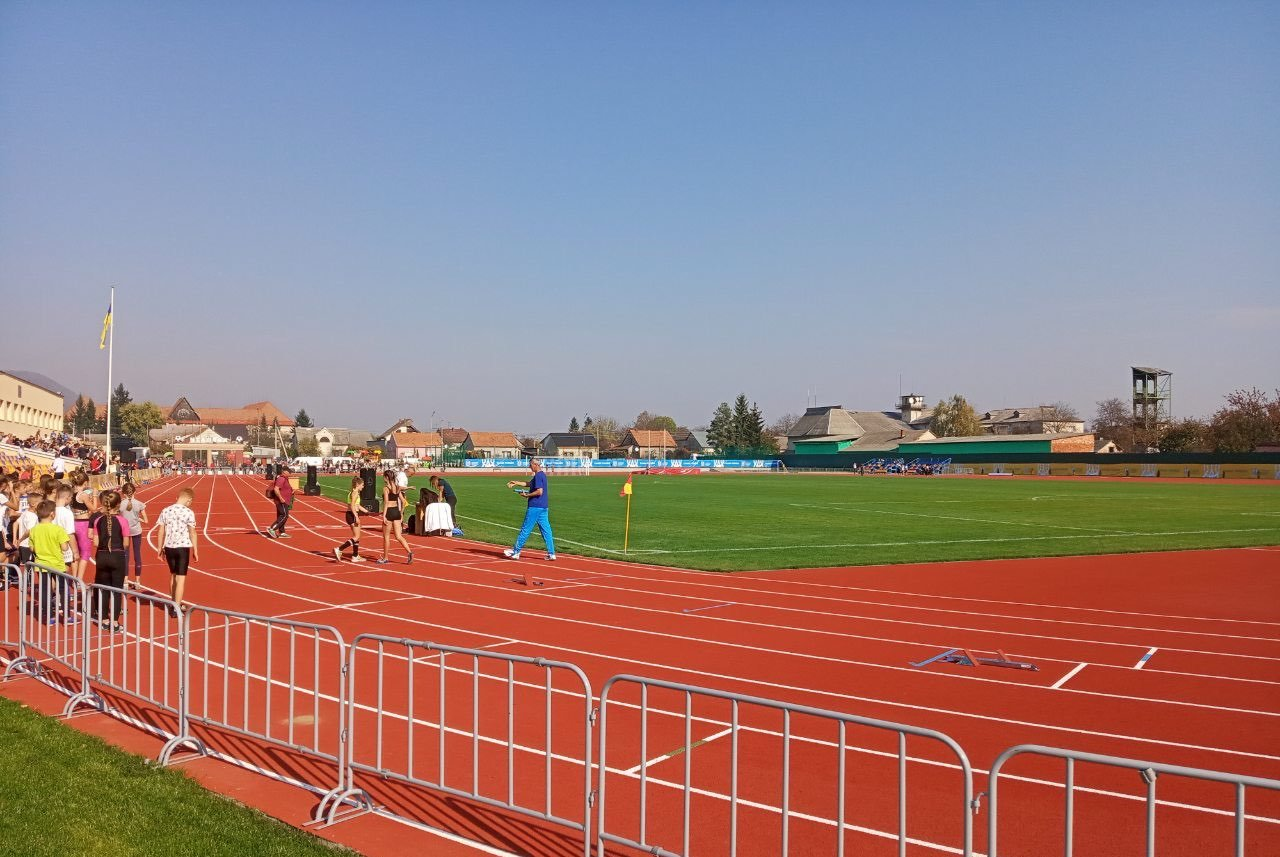
- Interactive map of Karpaty Stadium
- Full name: Municipal enterprise "Stadium Karpaty"
- Former names: Avanhard Stadium (1982-28 April 2003)
- Location: Borkanyuka Street, 15 Khust, Ukraine
- Coordinates: 48°10′41.6″N 23°16′43.6″E
- Owner: Khust city council
- Capacity: 5,200
- Surface: Grass
- Field size: 105 m × 68 m (344 ft × 223 ft)

Construction
- Built: 1982
- Opened: 1982; 44 years ago
- Renovated: 2007-2010, 2019

Tenant
- FC Khust (2019–present)

Karpaty Stadium (Ukrainian: Стадіон Карпати) is a football stadium in Khust, Ukraine. It is the home stadium of FC Khust.

Stadium was opened in 1982 as Avanhard and holds 5,200 spectators. It was used as home stadium by Fetrovyk Khust during the 1993–95 seasons in Ukrainian Third league. On 28 May 2003 stadium was reorganized into a municipal enterprise, run by the Khust city council. On 20 October 2019 stadium reopened after three year renovation.
