= FC Khust =

Khust
- Full name: Football Club Khust
- Founded: 2019
- Ground: Karpaty Stadium, Khust
- Capacity: 5,200
- Chairman: Mykhaylo Madyarchyk
- Manager: Volodymyr Tsytkin
- League: Ukrainian Second League
- 2024–25: Ukrainian First League, 18th of 18 (withdrew)
Home colours	Away colours

Football Club Khust (Ukrainian: Футбольний клуб Хуст) or Khust is a Ukrainian professional football team from Khust.

== History ==
Founded in 2019, until 2022 the club competed exclusively in regional competitions of Zakarpattia Oblast. The club managed to become the winner of the Zakarpattia Oblast Championship and Zakarpattia Oblast Super Cup in 2021. For the first time in 2022 the club turned professional and made its debut in the 2022–23 Ukrainian Second League.

== Players ==
=== Current squad ===
As of 3 July 2024

Note: Flags indicate national team as defined under FIFA eligibility rules; some limited exceptions apply. Players may hold more than one non-FIFA nationality.

No.	Pos.	Nation	Player
1	GK	UKR	Ihor Levchenko
5	DF	UKR	Mykola Syrash
7	MF	UKR	Denys Kurylets
8	MF	UKR	Mykola Tsvyk
9	FW	UKR	Vladyslav Harnaha
12	GK	UKR	Arsen Bielimenko
13	MF	UKR	Kostyantyn Kolchin
14	MF	UKR	Volodymyr Shevchuk
15	MF	UKR	Mykola Pylyp
17	MF	UKR	Bohdan Pavlych

No.	Pos.	Nation	Player
18	DF	UKR	Serhii Novikov
19	FW	UKR	Vladyslav Borysenko
20	DF	UKR	Vasyl Vasylynets
22	MF	UKR	Vladyslav Chaban
27	GK	UKR	Vladyslav Ryabenko
30	DF	UKR	Denys Chervinskyi
35	DF	UKR	Daniel Banyk
71	FW	UKR	Matvii Yanko
77	FW	UKR	Vladyslav Hromenko
94	DF	UKR	Vladyslav Ivanov

== League and cup history ==
Season	Div.	Pos.	Pl.	W	D	L	GS	GA	P	Domestic Cup	Europe		Notes
2022–23	3rd	2_{/10}	18	10	5	3	32	15	35	no competition	-	-	Promoted (Note: gained promotion by beating FSC Mariupol in promotion/relegation playoffs)
2023–24	2nd	16_{/20}	28	9	2	17	34	53	29	1/64 finals	-	-	(Note: lost promotion/relegation playoffs to PFC Zviahel, but retained its place due to withdrawal of the latter)
2024–25	2nd	18_{/18}	3	0	0	3	4	9	0	1/64 finals	-	-	Withdrew

== Coaches ==
- Head coach – Volodymyr Tsytkin
- Coach – Ihor Maslei

== See also ==
- FC Rus Khust
