= Maksym Serdyuk =

Ukrainian footballer (born 2002)

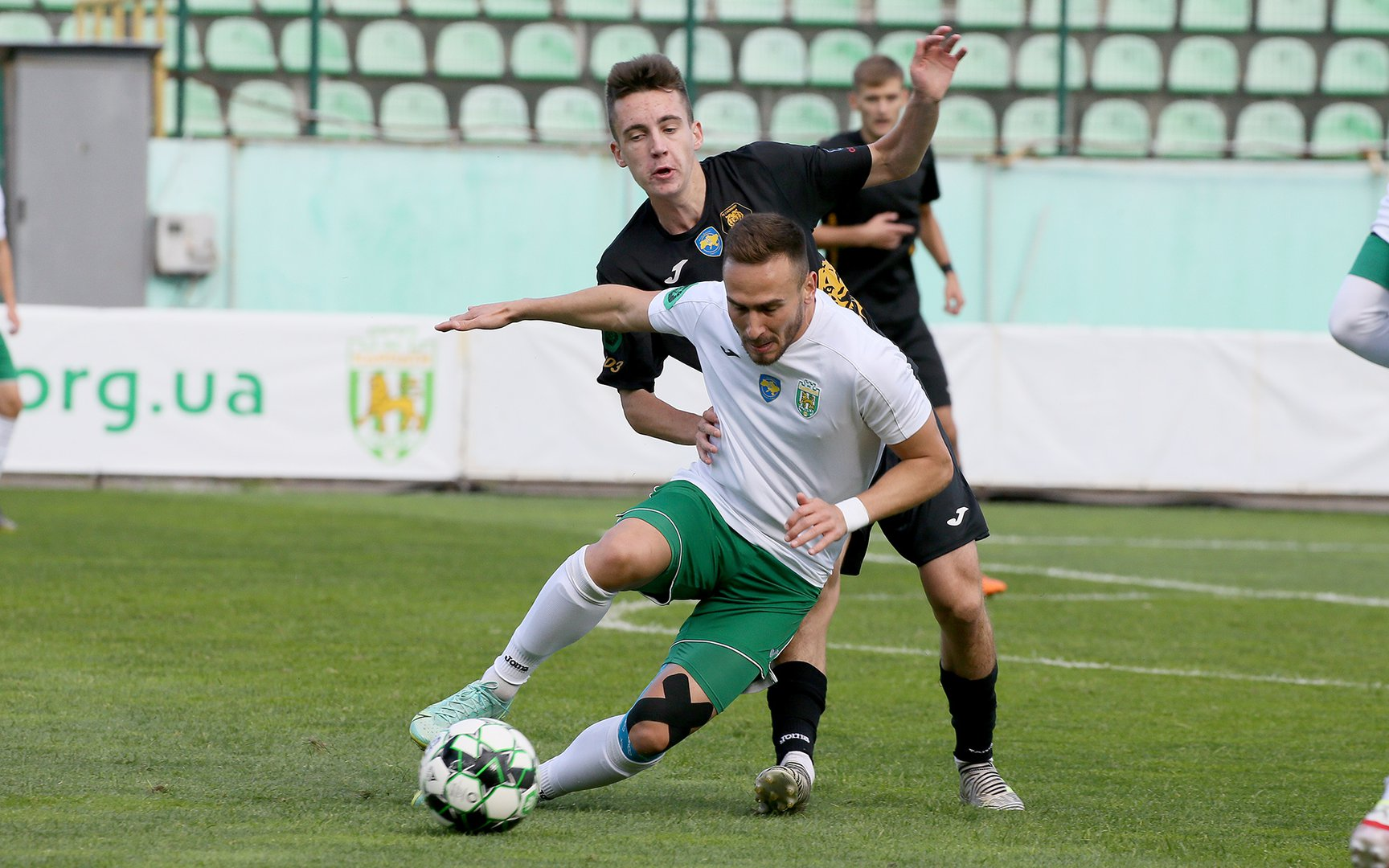

Personal information
- Full name: Maksym Mykolayovych Serdyuk
- Date of birth: 21 May 2002 (age 24)
- Place of birth: Chernihiv, Ukraine
- Height: 1.74 m (5 ft 9 in)
- Position: Midfielder

Team information
- Current team: Chernihiv
- Number: 77

Youth career
- 2017: Yunist Chernihiv

Senior career*
| Years | Team | Apps | (Gls) |
| 2017–2023 | Chernihiv | 74 | (8) |
| 2024–2025 | Livyi Bereh Kyiv | 3 | (0) |
| 2024–2025 | → Chernihiv (loan) | 16 | (2) |
| 2025– | Chernihiv | 35 | (4) |
- * Club domestic league appearances and goals as of 21 November 2026

Maksym Mykolayovych Serdyuk (Ukrainian: Максим Миколайович Сердюк; born 21 May 2002) is a Ukrainian professional footballer who plays as a midfielder for Chernihiv.

== Playing career ==
=== FC Chernihiv ===
Serdyuk started his career in FC Chernihiv, which became a professional club in 2020 when it joined the Ukrainian Second League. He made his professional debut in the 2020–21 Ukrainian Second League against Rubikon Kyiv. On 1 May 2021 he scored the winning goal against Bukovyna at the Chernihiv Arena. On 18 August he played in the 2021–22 Ukrainian Cup against Chaika Petropavlivska Borshchahivka, replacing Andriy Makarenko in the 63 minute.

On 16 October 2021 he scored his first goal of the 2021-22 Ukrainian Second League season against Lyubomyr Stavyshche at the Kolos Stadium in Stavyshche.

On 27 August 2022 he made his debut for the 2022–23 Ukrainian First League season against Skoruk Tomakivka at the Yunist Stadium in Chernihiv.

=== Livyi Bereh Kyiv ===
In January 2024 he moved to Livyi Bereh Kyiv in Ukrainian First League. In July 2025 his contract with the club was expired and it wasn't extended.

==== FC Chernihiv (Loan) ====
In July 2024 he was loaned to Chernihiv. On 8 June 2024, he scored his first goal in the season against Metalist 1925-2 Kharkiv at the Yunist Stadium in Chernihiv.

=== FC Chernihiv ===
In July 2024, signed a full contract with Chernihiv in Ukrainian First League. On 23 September, 2025, at the Optima Hotel in Chernihiv, he received, along with congratulations, a special jersey from FC Chernihiv for reaching 100 official appearances for the club.

== Career statistics ==
=== Club ===
As of match played 21 November 2026

Appearances and goals by club, season and competition
| Club | Season | League | | | Cup | | Europe | | Other | | Total | |
| Club | Season | Division | Apps | Goals | Apps | Goals | Apps | Goals | Apps | Goals | Apps | Goals |
|---|---|---|---|---|---|---|---|---|---|---|---|---|
| Chernihiv | 2017–18 | Ukrainian Football Amateur League | 0 | 0 | 0 | 0 | 0 | 0 | 0 | 0 | 0 | 0 |
| Chernihiv | 2018–19 | Ukrainian Football Amateur League | 0 | 0 | 0 | 0 | 0 | 0 | 0 | 0 | 0 | 0 |
| Chernihiv | 2019–20 | Ukrainian Football Amateur League | 0 | 0 | 0 | 0 | 0 | 0 | 0 | 0 | 0 | 0 |
| Chernihiv | 2020–21 | Ukrainian Second League | 21 | 2 | 0 | 0 | 0 | 0 | 0 | 0 | 21 | 2 |
| Chernihiv | 2021–22 | Ukrainian Second League | 17 | 1 | 2 | 0 | 0 | 0 | 0 | 0 | 19 | 1 |
| Chernihiv | 2022–23 | Ukrainian First League | 21 | 1 | 0 | 0 | 0 | 0 | 0 | 0 | 21 | 1 |
| Chernihiv | 2023–24 | Ukrainian First League | 16 | 4 | 0 | 0 | 0 | 0 | 0 | 0 | 17 | 4 |
| Livyi Bereh Kyiv | 2023–24 | Ukrainian First League | 3 | 0 | 0 | 0 | 0 | 0 | 0 | 0 | 3 | 0 |
| Chernihiv (loan) | 2024–25 | Ukrainian Second League | 16 | 2 | 2 | 0 | 0 | 0 | 4 | 0 | 22 | 2 |
| Chernihiv | 2025–26 | Ukrainian First League | 22 | 2 | 4 | 0 | 0 | 0 | 0 | 0 | 26 | 2 |
| Chernihiv | 2026–27 | Ukrainian First League | 13 | 2 | 3 | 0 | 0 | 0 | 0 | 0 | 16 | 2 |
| Career total | | | 128 | 14 | 12 | 0 | 0 | 0 | 4 | 0 | 144 | 14 |

== Honours ==
Chernihiv

- Ukrainian Cup runner-up: 2025–26

Individual

- Honoured Master of Sport of Ukraine
