= 2022–23 FC Chernihiv season =

Chernihiv
2022–23 season
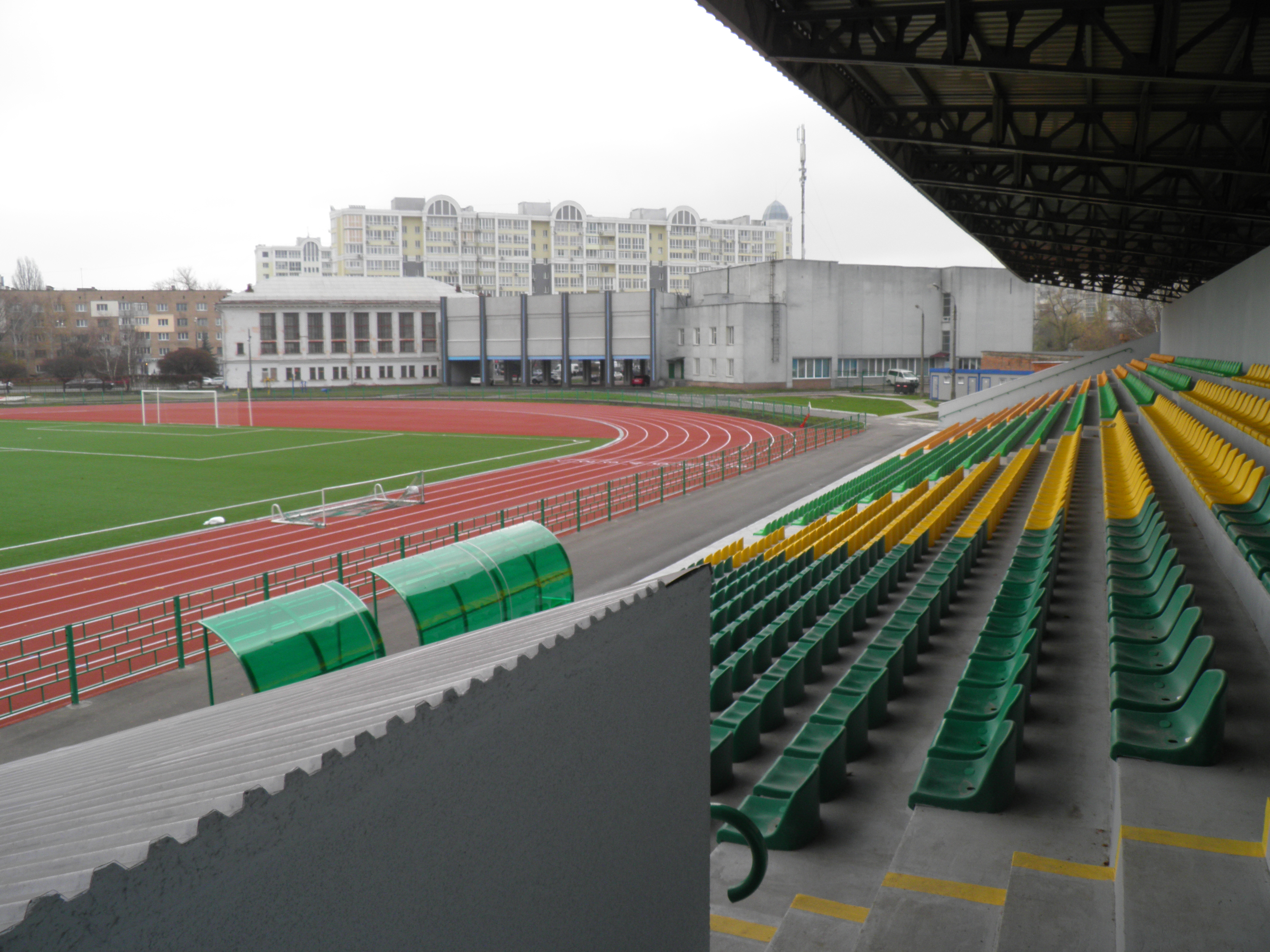
- Owner: Yuriy Synytsya
- Director: Mykola Synytsya
- Manager: Valeriy Chornyi
- Stadium: Chernihiv Arena; Yunist Stadium
- First League: 13th
- Ukrainian Cup: Cancelled
- Top goalscorer: League: Roman Vovk (3); Dmytro Kulyk (3); All: Roman Vovk (3); Dmytro Kulyk (3)
- Biggest win: Metalurh Zaporizhzhia 0-2 Chernihiv; Skoruk Tomakivka 0-2 Chernihiv; Horishni Plavni 0-2 Chernihiv
- Biggest defeat: Kremin Kremenchuk 3-0 Chernihiv
Home colours	Away colours	Third colours

The 2022–23 season was FC Chernihiv's first season in the Ukrainian First League. Due to the destruction of Chernihiv Arena, the club was forced to use the stadium Yunist Stadium.

== Season summary ==
The club signed several players, including Vladyslav Panko, Vyacheslav Koydan, Volodymyr Zubashivskyi, Vladyslav Shkolnyi, Oleksandr Rudenko, Myroslav Serdyuk, Roman Vovk, Dmytro Kulyk, Eduard Halstyan and Mykola Syrash. The club's first victory was against Metalurh Zaporizhzhia in Zaporizhzhia. In April 2023 JAKO has become a technical partner club.

== Players ==
=== Squad information ===
As of 14 April 2023

Squad no.	Name	Nationality	Position	Date of birth (age)
Goalkeepers
1	Oleksandr Shyray	(Ukraine)	GK	21 February 1992 (aged 30)
12	Artem Padun	(Ukraine)	GK	2 August 1983 (aged 38)
22	Oleksandr Roshchynskyi	(Ukraine)	GK	30 November 2000 (aged 21)
72	Yehor Kolomiets	(Ukraine)	GK	9 September 2003 (age 18)
Defenders
2	Eduard Halstyan	(Ukraine) (Armenia)	DF	1 October 1998 (aged 23)
3	Maksym Shumylo	(Ukraine)	DF	31 August 2002 (aged 19)
6	Andriy Veresotskyi	(Ukraine)	DF	21 January 1992 (aged 30)
15	Andriy Lakeyenko	(Ukraine)	DF	29 September 1999 (aged 22)
23	Oleksiy Zenchenko	(Ukraine)	DF	17 October 1996 (aged 25)
24	Oleksandr Rudenko	(Ukraine)	DF	23 October 1998 (aged 23)
Midfielders
5	Anatoliy Romanchenko	(Ukraine)	MF	19 May 2001 (aged 21)
7	Dmytro Myronenko	(Ukraine)	MF	7 March 1996 (aged 26)
8	Andriy Makarenko	(Ukraine)	MF	13 December 1996 (aged 25)
9	Kyrylo Kryvoborodenko	(Ukraine)	MF	8 September 1996 (aged 25)
10	Vyacheslav Koydan	(Ukraine)	MF	5 July 1994 (aged 28)
17	Myroslav Serdyuk	(Ukraine)	MF	27 July 1999 (aged 22)
21	Vladyslav Shkolnyi	(Ukraine)	MF	14 March 1999 (aged 23)
26	Vladyslav Panko	(Ukraine)	MF	16 February 1999 (aged 23)
27	Mykola Syrash	(Ukraine)	MF	7 February 1999 (aged 23)
30	Artur Bybik	(Ukraine)	MF	26 July 2001 (aged 20)
31	Vitaliy Mentey (Captain)	(Ukraine)	MF	5 August 1992 (aged 29)
77	Maksym Serdyuk	(Ukraine)	MF	21 May 2002 (aged 20)
99	Volodymyr Zubashivskyi	(Ukraine)	MF	28 February 1999 (aged 23)
Forwards
11	Pavlo Fedosov	(Ukraine)	FW	14 August 1996 (aged 25)
79	Roman Vovk	(Ukraine)	FW	5 March 1997 (aged 25)
91	Dmytro Kulyk	(Ukraine)	FW	26 January 2001 (aged 21)

== Transfers ==
=== In ===
Date	Pos.	Player	Age	Moving from	Type	Fee	Source
Summer
8 August 2022	MF	(Ukraine) Vladyslav Panko	20	(Ukraine) Desna-3 Chernihiv	Transfer	Free	
22 August 2022	MF	(Ukraine) Vyacheslav Koydan	28	(Ukraine) Olimpik Donetsk	Transfer	Free	
23 August 2022	MF	(Ukraine) Volodymyr Zubashivskyi	23	(Ukraine) Kudrivka	Transfer	Free	
24 August 2022	MF	(Ukraine) Vladyslav Shkolnyi	20	(Ukraine) Desna-3 Chernihiv	Transfer	Free	
24 August 2022	DF	(Ukraine) Oleksandr Rudenko	23	(Ukraine) Desna-2 Chernihiv	Transfer	Free	
25 August 2022	MF	(Ukraine) Myroslav Serdyuk	23	(Ukraine) Kudrivka	Transfer	Free	
25 August 2022	FW	(Ukraine) Roman Vovk	25	(Ukraine) Kudrivka	Transfer	Free	
26 August 2022	GK	(Ukraine) Yehor Kolomiets	18	(Ukraine) Desna-3 Chernihiv	Transfer	Free	
26 August 2022	MF	(Ukraine) Dmytro Kulyk	21	(Ukraine) Kudrivka	Transfer	Free	
26 August 2022	DF	(Armenia) Eduard Halstyan	23	(Ukraine) Desna-2 Chernihiv	Transfer	Free	
26 August 2022	MF	(Ukraine) Mykola Syrash	23	(Ukraine) Kudrivka	Transfer	Free	
Winter
1 March 2023	FW	(Ukraine) Pavlo Fedosov	26	Unattached	Transfer	Free	
1 March 2023	MF	(Ukraine) Kyrylo pinchuk	19	Unattached	Transfer	Free	

=== Out ===
Date	Pos.	Player	Age	Moving from	Type	Fee	Source
Summer
9 August 2022	DF	(Ukraine) Mykyta Hrebenshchykov	18	Unattached	End Contract		
10 August 2022	MF	(Ukraine) Andriy Porokhnya	25	(Ukraine) Druzhba Myrivka	Transfer		
19 August 2022	MF	(Ukraine) Denys Kildiy	17	(Lithuania) Akmene	End Contract		
20 August 2022	MF	(Ukraine) Dmytro Borshch	28	Unattached	End Contract		
20 August 2022	FW	(Ukraine) Vladyslav Kyryn	25	Unattached	End Contract		
21 August 2022	FW	(Ukraine) Anatoliy Kokhanovskyi	26	Unattached	End Contract		
21 August 2022	FW	(Ukraine) Bohdan Lytvynenko	19	Unattached	End Contract		
21 August 2022	FW	(Ukraine) Maksym Chaus	28	Unattached	End Contract		
Winter
3 March 2023	DF	(Ukraine) Vladyslav Panko	28	Unattached	End Contract		

== Pre-season and friendlies ==
Win Draw Loss

6 August 2022 Friendly	Dinaz Vyshhorod (Ukraine)	2–1	(Ukraine) Chernihiv	Kyiv
EET (UTC+02:00)		Report	Panko

13 August 2022 Friendly	SC Chaika (Ukraine)	2–1	(Ukraine) Chernihiv	Borshchahivka
EET (UTC+02:00)			Mentey (pen.)	Stadium: Stadium Borshchahivka

17 August 2022 Friendly	Obolon Kyiv (Ukraine)	3–1	(Ukraine) Chernihiv	Kyiv
EET (UTC+02:00)	Slobodyan 27' (pen); Batalskyi 67'; Krasnopir 85'	Report

20 August 2022 Friendly	Chernihiv (Ukraine)	1–1	(Ukraine) Rubikon Kyiv	Chernihiv
EET (UTC+02:00)	Makarenko			Stadium: Yunist stadium

26 February 2023 Friendly	Epitsentr Dunaivtsi (Ukraine)	3–3	(Ukraine) Chernihiv	Kyiv
EET (UTC+3:00)	Buryak 30'; Lyashenko 31'; Hirnyi 85'	Report	Serdyuk 1'; Shkolnyi 55'; Shkolnyi 58'

4 March 2023 Friendly	SC Chaika (Ukraine)	3–0	(Ukraine) Chernihiv	Borshchahivka
EET (UTC+02:00)	Smityukh; Mnyshenko; Tyshchenko 47'	Report		Stadium: Stadium Borshchahivka

9 March 2023 Friendly	Nyva Buzova (Ukraine)	2–0	(Ukraine) Chernihiv	Kyiv
EET (UTC+13:15)	Somov 35'; Somov 40'	Report		Stadium: Buzova Arena

18 March 2023 Friendly	Obolon Kyiv (Ukraine)	3–0	(Ukraine) Chernihiv	Bucha
EET (UTC+02:00)	Prokopenko 60'; Oliynyk 75'; Yermolenko 85'	Report		Stadium: Stadion Yuvileinyi

21 March 2023 Friendly	Epitsentr Dunaivtsi (Ukraine)	0–1	(Ukraine) Chernihiv	Kyiv
EET (UTC+3:00)		Report	Romanchenko 78'(pen)

22 March 2023 Friendly	Dinaz Vyshhorod (Ukraine)	1–0	(Ukraine) Chernihiv	Pirnove
EET (UTC+3:00)		Report

25 March 2023 Friendly	Chernihiv (Ukraine)	0–2	(Ukraine) Druzhba Myrivka	Pirnove
EET (UTC+3:00)		Report

1 April 2023 Friendly	Livyi Bereh Kyiv (Ukraine)	0–0	(Ukraine) Chernihiv	Osokorky
EET (UTC+3:00)		Report		Stadium: Arena Livyi Bereh

== Competitions ==
=== Overall record ===
Competition	First match	Last match	Starting round	Record							
Competition	First match	Last match	Starting round	Pld	W	D	L	GF	GA	GD	Win %
First League	27 August 2022	1 April 2023	Matchday 1	22	6	6	10	20	28	−8	27.27
Ukrainian Cup	Cancelled	Cancelled	Cancelled	0	0	0	0	0	0	+0	—
Total				22	6	6	10	20	28	−8	27.27

Last updated: 26 May 2023
Source: Results

=== Results by round ===
Round	1	2	3	4	5	6	7	8	9	10	11	12	13	14	15	16	17	18	19	20	21	22
Ground	H	H	A	H	A	H	A	H	A	H	A	H	A	A	H	A	H	A	A	H	A	H
Result	D	L	W	L	D	L	W	W	L	D	D	L	W	L	W	L	W	L	D	D	L	L
Position	1	3	3	5	?	?	5	3	5	5	5	6	5	6	8	9	9	10	10	10	12	13

Updated to match(es) played on 26 May 2023. Source: Results
A = Away; H = Home; W = Win; D = Draw; L = Loss

== Group B league table ==
Pos	Team	Pld	W	D	L	GF	GA	GD	Pts	Promotion, qualification or relegation
1	LNZ Cherkasy	13	8	3	2	17	6	+11	27	Qualified to the Promotion group
2	Obolon Kyiv	13	8	2	3	18	8	+10	26	Qualified to the Promotion group
3	Metalurh Zaporizhzhia	13	5	5	3	16	14	+2	20	Qualified to the Promotion group
4	Kremin Kremenchuk	13	5	3	5	25	24	+1	18	Qualified to the Promotion group
5	Chernihiv	13	4	4	5	13	14	−1	16	Qualified to the Relegation group
6	Poltava	13	4	3	6	15	17	−2	15	Qualified to the Relegation group
7	Skoruk Tomakivka	13	2	5	6	13	22	−9	11	Qualified to the Relegation group
8	Hirnyk-Sport Horishni Plavni	12	1	5	6	8	18	−10	8	Qualified to the Relegation group

Updated to match(es) played on 20 November 2022. Source: PFL.ua
Rules for classification: 1) Points; 2) Head-to-head points; 3) Head-to-head goal difference; 4) Head-to-head goals scored; 5) Goal difference in all games; 6) Goals scored in all games (Note: calculation by criteria indicated in rules 2, 3, 4 is conducted with consideration of all teams that have an equal number of tournament points at the moment of calculation and not only among those which after preliminary criteria have appeared more successful).

== Relegation group league table ==
Pos	Team	Pld	W	D	L	GF	GA	GD	Pts	Promotion, qualification or relegation
9	Prykarpattia Ivano-Frankivsk	14	6	6	2	21	11	+10	24	
10	Skoruk Tomakivka	14	5	8	1	18	9	+9	23	
11	Bukovyna Chernivtsi	14	5	6	3	18	14	+4	21 (Note: Head-to-head goal difference: Bukovyna +4, Dinaz -1)	
12	Dinaz Vyshhorod	14	5	6	3	16	17	−1	21	
13	Chernihiv	14	5	4	5	15	16	−1	19	
14	Poltava	14	4	4	6	16	22	−6	16	
15	Mariupol (Q)	14	3	3	8	18	23	−5	12	Qualification to relegation play-off
16	Hirnyk-Sport Horishni Plavni (R)	14	2	5	7	12	22	−10	11	Relegation to Ukrainian Second League

Source: PFL.ua
Rules for classification: 1) Points; 2) Head-to-head points; 3) Head-to-head goal difference; 4) Head-to-head goals scored; 5) Goal difference in all games; 6) Goals scored in all games (Note: calculation by criteria indicated in rules 2, 3, 4 is conducted with consideration of all teams that have an equal number of tournament points at the moment of calculation and not only among those which after preliminary criteria have appeared more successful).
(Q) Qualified for the phase indicated; (R) Relegated

=== Results ===
27 August 2022 1	Chernihiv	1–1	Skoruk Tomakivka	Chernihiv
EEST (UTC+3)	Romanchenko (yellow card) 2'; Kryvoborodenko (yellow card) 47'; Soroka 90' (org); Mentey (yellow card) 90+4'	Report	Tsurkan (yellow card) 45'; Soroka 50'; Mishurenko (yellow card) 51'; Sharko (yellow card) 86'	Stadium: Yunist Stadium; Referee: P.I. Detsyuk

10 September 2022 2	Chernihiv	0–1	Obolon Kyiv	Chernihiv
EEST (UTC+3)	Myronenko (yellow card) 72'; Syrash (yellow card) 79'; Serdyuk (yellow card) 90'; Romanchenko (yellow card) 90+1'	Report	Kosovskyi (yellow card) 59'; Batalskyi 89'(pen)	Stadium: Yunist Stadium; Referee: Titov O.I.

17 September 2022 3	Metalurh Zaporizhzhia	0–2	Chernihiv	Zaporizhzhia
EEST (UTC+3)	Sad (yellow card) 77'	Report	Myronenko 12'; Mentey (yellow card) 19'; Bybik (yellow card) 51'; Kulyk (yellow card) 61'; Koydan 85'	Stadium: Slavutych-Arena; Referee: Telbukh L.V.

25 September 2022 4	Chernihiv	0–2	LNZ Cherkasy	Chernihiv
EEST (UTC+3)	Kulyk (yellow card) 44'; Serdyuk (yellow card) 45+1'; Romanchenko (yellow card) 78'	Report	Savin 31'; Polyulyakh (yellow card) 53'; Nekhtiy (yellow card) 57'; Zamurenko 87'; Tarasenko (yellow card) 92+2'	Stadium: Yunist Stadium; Referee: Sergey Zadyran

1 October 2022 5	Poltava	1–1	Chernihiv	Poltava
EEST (UTC+3)	Streltsov 8'; Kopytov (yellow card) 64'; Shcherbak (yellow card) 84'; Yaremenko (yellow card) 90+4'	Report	Serdyuk (yellow card) 12'; Vovk (yellow card) 16'; Vovk 24'; Mentey (yellow card) 30'; Kryvoborodenko (yellow card) 83'	Stadium: Lokomotyv Stadium

8 October 2022 6	Chernihiv	0–2	Kremin Kremenchuk	Chernihiv
EEST (UTC+3)	Mentey (yellow card) 52'; Kulyk (yellow card) 59'; Myronenko (yellow card) 87'	Report	Savitskyi 14'; Myronenko 45+1' (o.g.); Arkusha (yellow card) 87'	Stadium: Yunist Stadium

15 October 2022 7	Skoruk Tomakivka	0–2	Chernihiv	Uman
EEST (UTC+3)	Laptyev (yellow card) 83'	Report	Bybik (yellow card) 21'; Syrash (yellow card) 38'; Myronenko (yellow card) 53'; Vovk 47'; Serdyuk (yellow card) 53'; Shumylo (yellow card) 78'; Vovk 86'	Stadium: Tsentralnyi Stadion; Referee: Podrygulya S.V.

23 October 2022 8	Chernihiv	2–1	Hirnyk-Sport Horishni Plavni	Chernihiv
EEST (UTC+3)	Romanchenko (yellow card) 48'; Bybik (yellow card) 60'; Kulyk 72'; Syrash 88'; Serdyuk (yellow card) 90+1'	Report	Horbachenko 8'; Nikolyshyn (yellow card) 51'; Bodnya (yellow card) 64'; Shynkarenko (yellow card) 86'	Stadium: Yunist Stadium; Referee: Reznikov D.M.

30 October 2022 9	Obolon Kyiv	3–1	Chernihiv	Kyiv
EEST (UTC+3)	Batalskyi 16'; Batalskyi 39'; Batalskyi 53'	Report	Kulyk 35'; Serdyuk (yellow card) 64'; Lakeyenko (yellow card) 81'; Makarenko (yellow card) 90+3'	Stadium: Obolon Arena; Referee: Lapko S.R.

6 November 2022 10	Chernihiv	0–0	Metalurh Zaporizhzhia	Chernihiv
EEST (UTC+3)	Koydan (yellow card) 79'	Report	Borysenko (yellow card) 66'; Kicha (yellow card) 89'	Stadium: Yunist Stadium; Referee: Lapko S.R.

12 November 2022 11	LNZ Cherkasy	2–2	Chernihiv	Cherkasy
EEST (UTC+3)	Dolinskyi 27'; Polyulyakh (yellow card) 45+2'; Kopyl (yellow card) 56'; Storchous 90+1'	Report	Kulyk 42'; Syrash 57'; Shumylo (yellow card) 60'; Myronenko (yellow card) 70'	Stadium: Cherkasy Arena; Referee: Afanasiev O.O.

20 November 2022 12	Chernihiv	0–1	Poltava	Chernihiv
EEST (UTC+3)	Serdyuk (yellow card) 17'; Syrash (yellow card) 52'	Report	Romanchenko 6' (o.g.); Savenkov (yellow card) 35'; Pos (yellow card) 56'; Kovalenko (yellow card) 69'	Stadium: Yunist Stadium; Referee: Zabroda K.V.

24 November 2022 13	Hirnyk-Sport Horishni Plavni	0–2	Chernihiv	Horishni Plavni
EEST (UTC+3)	Shynkarenko (yellow card) 58'; Bodnya (yellow card) 90'; Horbachenko (yellow card) 90'	Report	Serdyuk 10'; Mentey (yellow card) 43'; Mentey 45'; Kryvoborodenko (yellow card) 90'	Stadium: Yunist Stadium; Referee: D. Kuzovlev

27 November 2022 14	Kremin Kremenchuk	3–0	Chernihiv	Kremenchuk
EEST (UTC+3)	Halata 52'; Halata 57'; Halata 88'; Pylypenko (yellow card) 90+4'	Report	Syrash (yellow card) 74'; Bybik (yellow card) 83'	Stadium: Kremin Stadium

8 April 2023 15	Chernihiv	2–1	Mariupol	Chernihiv
EEST (UTC+3)	Serdyuk 25'; Serdyuk (yellow card) 35'; Shyray (red card) 80; Serdyuk 90+6'	Report	Dobrokhotov 86'(pen)	Stadium: Yunist Stadium

14 April 2023 16	Bukovyna Chernivtsi	3–1	Chernihiv	Chernivtsi
EEST (UTC+3)	Skrypnyk 3'; Hakman (yellow card) 45'; Novotryasov (yellow card) 65'; Prokopchuk 80'; Prokopchuk (yellow card) 84'; Serhiychuk 67'	Report	Kulyk (yellow card) 12'; Romanchenko (yellow card) 30'; Zenchenko (yellow card) 54'; Romanchenko 67' (pen); Shumylo (yellow card) 68'; Serdyuk (yellow card) 77'	Stadium: Bukovyna

22 April 2023 17	Chernihiv	2–1	Dinaz Vyshhorod	Chernihiv
EEST (UTC+3)	Romanchenko 57' (pen); Myronenko 56'	Report	Kos 61' (pen); Morarenko (yellow card) 74'	Stadium: Yunist Stadium

29 April 2023 18	Prykarpattia	2–0	Chernihiv	Ivano-Frankivsk
EEST (UTC+3)	Barchuk 18'; Tsyutsyura 32'; Khoma 52'; Borysevych 79'	Report	Shumylo (red card) 57; Halstyan (yellow card) 87'	Stadium: MCS Rukh

7 May 2023 19	Mariupol	1–1	Chernihiv	Boryspil
EEST (UTC+3)	Penteleychuk (yellow card) 27'; Lityuk (yellow card) 61'; Bykovskyi 73'; Mykhaylenko (yellow card) 75'	Report	Zenchenko 18'; Kulyk (yellow card) 25'; Zenchenko (yellow card) 32'; Kryvoborodenko (yellow card) 63'	Stadium: Kolos Stadium

14 May 2023 20	Chernihiv	1–1	Bukovyna Chernivtsi	Chernihiv
EEST (UTC+3)	Serdyuk (yellow card) 11'; Mentey 66'; Kulyk (yellow card) 80'; Kulyk (yellow card) 90+4'	Report	Serdyuk (yellow card) 11'; Palahnyuk 90+1'	Stadium: Yunist Stadium

20 May 2023 21	Dinaz Vyshhorod	1–0	Chernihiv	Lyutizh
EEST (UTC+3)	Kirichenko (yellow card) 43'; Voloshyn (yellow card) 63'; Orynchak 43'	Report	Kryvoborodenko (yellow card) 5'; Mentey (yellow card) 90+2'	Stadium: Dinaz Stadium

26 May 2023 22	Chernihiv	0–2	Prykarpattia	Chernihiv
EEST (UTC+3)	Romanchenko (yellow card) 44'; Serdyuk (yellow card) 53'; Kryvoborodenko (yellow card) 70'; Bybik (yellow card) 81'; Koydan (yellow card) 87'	Report	Shynkarenko (yellow card) 13'; Rudyuk (yellow card) 57'; Barchuk 73'; Khoma (yellow card) 83'; Khoma 88'	Stadium: Yunist Stadium

=== Ukrainian Cup ===
2022	Cancelled
EEST (UTC+3)

== Statistics ==
=== Appearances and goals ===
No.	Pos	Nat	Player	Total		Ukrainian Second League		Cup		EL	
No.	Pos	Nat	Player	Apps	Goals	Apps	Goals	Apps	Goals	Apps	Goals
Goalkeepers
1	GK	(Ukraine) UKR	Oleksandr Shyray	19	0	19	0	0	0	0	0
12	GK	(Ukraine) UKR	Artem Padun	0	0	0	0	0	0	0	0
22	GK	(Ukraine) UKR	Oleksandr Roshchynskyi	2	0	2	0	0	0	0	0
72	GK	(Ukraine) UKR	Yehor Kolomiets	3	0	3	0	0	0	0	0
Defenders
2	DF	(Armenia) ARM	Eduard Halstyan	16	0	16	0	0	0	0	0
3	DF	(Ukraine) UKR	Maksym Shumylo	17	0	17	0	0	0	0	0
6	DF	(Ukraine) UKR	Andriy Veresotskyi	3	0	3	0	0	0	0	0
15	DF	(Ukraine) UKR	Andriy Lakeyenko	13	0	13	0	0	0	0	0
23	DF	(Ukraine) UKR	Oleksiy Zenchenko	11	1	11	1	0	0	0	0
24	DF	(Ukraine) UKR	Oleksandr Rudenko	2	0	2	0	0	0	0	0
Midfielders
5	MF	(Ukraine) UKR	Anatoly Romanchenko	21	2	21	2	0	0	0	0
7	MF	(Ukraine) UKR	Dmytro Myronenko	21	2	21	2	0	0	0	0
8	MF	(Ukraine) UKR	Andriy Makarenko	9	0	9	0	0	0	0	0
9	MF	(Ukraine) UKR	Kyrylo Kryvoborodenko	19	0	19	0	0	0	0	0
10	MF	(Ukraine) UKR	Vyacheslav Koydan	18	1	18	1	0	0	0	0
17	MF	(Ukraine) UKR	Myroslav Serdyuk	20	2	20	2	0	0	0	0
21	MF	(Ukraine) UKR	Vladyslav Shkolnyi	5	0	5	0	0	0	0	0
26	MF	(Ukraine) UKR	Kyrylo Pinchuk	4	0	4	0	0	0	0	0
27	MF	(Ukraine) UKR	Mykola Syrash	21	2	21	2	0	0	0	0
30	MF	(Ukraine) UKR	Artur Bybik	16	0	16	0	0	0	0	0
31	MF	(Ukraine) UKR	Vitaliy Mentey	18	2	18	2	0	0	0	0
77	MF	(Ukraine) UKR	Maksym Serdyuk	21	1	21	1	0	0	0	0
99	MF	(Ukraine) UKR	Volodymyr Zubashivskyi	8	0	8	0	0	0	0	0
Forwards
79	FW	(Ukraine) UKR	Roman Vovk	12	3	12	3	0	0	0	0
91	FW	(Ukraine) UKR	Dmytro Kulyk	21	3	21	3	0	0	0	0
11	FW	(Ukraine) UKR	Pavlo Fedosov	0	0	0	0	0	0	0	0
Players transferred out during the season
26	MF	(Ukraine) UKR	Vladyslav Panko	1	0	1	0	0	0	0	0

Source: Competitions

Last updated: 26 May 2023

=== Disciplinary record ===
No.	Pos	Nat	Player	First League			Ukrainian Cup			Europa League			Total		
No.	Pos	Nat	Player	Yellow card	(yellow card) (yellow-red card)	Red card	Yellow card	(yellow card) (yellow-red card)	Red card	Yellow card	(yellow card) (yellow-red card)	Red card	Yellow card	(yellow card) (yellow-red card)	Red card
91	FW	(Ukraine)	Dmytro Kulyk	6	0	0	0	0	0	0	0	0	6	0	0
31	MF	(Ukraine)	Vitaliy Mentey	6	0	0	0	0	0	0	0	0	6	0	0
5	MF	(Ukraine)	Anatoliy Romanchenko	6	0	0	0	0	0	0	0	0	5	0	0
77	DF	(Ukraine)	Maksym Serdyuk	6	0	0	0	0	0	0	0	0	6	0	0
9	MF	(Ukraine)	Kyrylo Kryvoborodenko	6	0	0	0	0	0	0	0	0	6	0	0
30	MF	(Ukraine)	Artur Bybik	5	0	0	0	0	0	0	0	0	5	0	0
17	MF	(Ukraine)	Myroslav Serdyuk	4	0	0	0	0	0	0	0	0	4	0	0
7	MF	(Ukraine)	Dmytro Myronenko	4	0	0	0	0	0	0	0	0	4	0	0
27	MF	(Ukraine)	Mykola Syrash	4	0	0	0	0	0	0	0	0	4	0	0
3	MF	(Ukraine)	Maksym Shumylo	3	0	1	0	0	0	0	0	0	3	0	1
23	DF	(Ukraine)	Oleksiy Zenchenko	2	0	0	0	0	0	0	0	0	2	0	0
10	MF	(Ukraine)	Vyacheslav Koydan	2	0	0	0	0	0	0	0	0	2	0	0
79	FW	(Ukraine)	Roman Vovk	1	0	0	0	0	0	0	0	0	1	0	0
15	DF	(Ukraine)	Andriy Lakeyenko	1	0	0	0	0	0	0	0	0	1	0	0
2	DF	(Armenia)	Eduard Halstyan	1	0	0	0	0	0	0	0	0	1	0	0
1	GK	(Ukraine)	Oleksandr Shyray	0	0	1	0	0	0	0	0	0	0	0	1
8	MF	(Ukraine)	Andriy Makarenko	1	0	0	0	0	0	0	0	0	1	0	0
			Total	57	0	2	0	0	0	0	0	0	57	0	2

Last updated: 26 May 2023

=== Goalscorers ===
Rank	No.	Pos	Nat	Name	Premier League	Cup	Europa League	Total
1	79	FW	(Ukraine)	Roman Vovk	3	0	0	3
2	91	FW	(Ukraine)	Dmytro Kulyk	3	0	0	3
8	31	MF	(Ukraine)	Vitaliy Mentey	2	0	0	2
3	17	MF	(Ukraine)	Myroslav Serdyuk	2	0	0	2
4	27	MF	(Ukraine)	Mykola Syrash	2	0	0	2
5	77	MF	(Ukraine)	Anatoly Romanchenko	2	0	0	2
6	7	MF	(Ukraine)	Dmytro Myronenko	2	0	0	2
7	10	MF	(Ukraine)	Vyacheslav Koydan	1	0	0	1
9	77	MF	(Ukraine)	Maksym Serdyuk	1	0	0	1
				Total	16	0	0	16

Last updated: 13 May 2023

=== Clean sheets ===
Rank	No.	Pos	Nat	Name	Premier League	Cup	Europa League	Total
1	1	GK	(Ukraine)	Oleksandr Shyray	5	0	0	5
2	72	GK	(Ukraine)	Yehor Kolomiets	1	0	0	1
				Total	6	0	0	6

Last updated: 24 April 2023
