= List of Ukrainian football transfers summer 2023 =

This is a list of Ukrainian football transfers summer 2023.

== Ukrainian Premier League ==
=== Chornomorets Odesa ===
In:

No.	Pos.	Nation	Player

Out:

No.	Pos.	Nation	Player
18	MF	(Ukraine) UKR	Andriy Tsurikov (to Kolos Kovalivka)

=== Dnipro-1 ===
In:

No.	Pos.	Nation	Player
21	GK	(Ukraine) UKR	Roman Mysak (from (Armenia) Alashkert)
—	DF	(Ukraine) UKR	Vasyl Kravets (from Vorskla Poltava)

Out:

No.	Pos.	Nation	Player

=== Dynamo Kyiv ===
In:

No.	Pos.	Nation	Player

Out:

No.	Pos.	Nation	Player
—	DF	(Ukraine) UKR	Mykyta Burda (to Kolos Kovalivka)

=== Kolos Kovalivka ===
In:

No.	Pos.	Nation	Player
—	GK	(Ukraine) UKR	Valentyn Horokh (from Oleksandriya)
6	DF	(Ukraine) UKR	Mykyta Burda (from Dynamo Kyiv)
5	DF	(Ukraine) UKR	Valeriy Bondarenko (from Shakhtar Donetsk)
9	DF	(Ukraine) UKR	Andriy Tsurikov (from Oleksandriya)
7	MF	(Ukraine) UKR	Oleksandr Demchenko (from Chornomorets Odesa)

Out:

No.	Pos.	Nation	Player

=== Kryvbas Kryvyi Rih ===
In:

No.	Pos.	Nation	Player

Out:

No.	Pos.	Nation	Player

=== LNZ Cherkasy ===
In:

No.	Pos.	Nation	Player

Out:

No.	Pos.	Nation	Player

=== Metalist 1925 Kharkiv ===
In:

No.	Pos.	Nation	Player

Out:

No.	Pos.	Nation	Player
23	DF	(Ukraine) UKR	Mykhaylo Shershen (to Inhulets Petrove)

=== Mynai ===
In:

No.	Pos.	Nation	Player

Out:

No.	Pos.	Nation	Player

=== Obolon Kyiv ===
In:

No.	Pos.	Nation	Player

Out:

No.	Pos.	Nation	Player

=== Oleksandriya ===
In:

No.	Pos.	Nation	Player

Out:

No.	Pos.	Nation	Player
1	GK	(Ukraine) UKR	Valentyn Horokh (to Kolos Kovalivka)
29	DF	(Ukraine) UKR	Andriy Tsurikov (to Kolos Kovalivka)

=== Polissya Zhytomyr ===
In:

No.	Pos.	Nation	Player

Out:

No.	Pos.	Nation	Player

=== Rukh Lviv ===
In:

No.	Pos.	Nation	Player

Out:

No.	Pos.	Nation	Player

=== Shakhtar Donetsk ===
In:

No.	Pos.	Nation	Player

Out:

No.	Pos.	Nation	Player
—	DF	(Ukraine) UKR	Valeriy Bondarenko (to Kolos Kovalivka)

=== Veres Rivne ===
In:

No.	Pos.	Nation	Player

Out:

No.	Pos.	Nation	Player

=== Vorskla Poltava ===
In:

No.	Pos.	Nation	Player
—	GK	(Ukraine) UKR	Daniil Yermolov (from Kremin Kremenchuk)

Out:

No.	Pos.	Nation	Player
20	DF	(Ukraine) UKR	Vasyl Kravets (to Dnipro-1)

=== Zorya Luhansk ===
In:

No.	Pos.	Nation	Player

Out:

No.	Pos.	Nation	Player

== Ukrainian First League ==
=== Ahrobiznes Volochysk ===
In:

No.	Pos.	Nation	Player
—	MF	(Ukraine) UKR	Roman Kuzmyn (from Prykarpattia Ivano-Frankivsk)
1	GK	(Ukraine) UKR	Andrey Popovich (from FC Fenix)
71	GK	(Ukraine) UKR	Danylo Khmelovskyi (from Standard Novi Sanzhary)
50	GK	(Ukraine) UKR	Mykyta Minchev (from Oleksandriya)
4	DF	(Ukraine) UKR	Ruslan Barylyak (from FC Fenix)
5	DF	(Ukraine) UKR	Vitalii Miachyn (from Real Pharma Odesa)
14	DF	(Ukraine) UKR	Roman Bolyi (from FC Fenix)
44	DF	(Ukraine) UKR	Semen Datsenko (from Hirnyk-Sport Horishni Plavni)

Out:

No.	Pos.	Nation	Player

=== FC Chernihiv ===
In:

No.	Pos.	Nation	Player
—	MF	(Ukraine) UKR	Nikita Posmashnyi (from Desna-3 Chernihiv)
—	MF	(Ukraine) UKR	Dzhilindo Bezghubchenko (from Dinaz Vyshhorod)
—	MF	(Ukraine) UKR	Daniil Davydenko
—	MF	(Ukraine) UKR	Stanislav Khomych (from Desna-3 Chernihiv)
—	MF	(Ukraine) UKR	Artem Strilets (from Khust)
—	GK	(Ukraine) UKR	Denys Herasymenko (from (Czech Republic) MSM Football Academy)

Out:

No.	Pos.	Nation	Player
—	DF	(Ukraine) UKR	Volodymyr Zubashivskyi (to Kudrivka)
—	DF	(Ukraine) UKR	Oleksandr Rudenko (to Kudrivka)
—	MF	(Ukraine) UKR	Myroslav Serdyuk (to Kudrivka)
—	MF	(Ukraine) UKR	Mykola Syrash (to Kudrivka)
—	FW	(Ukraine) UKR	Dmytro Kulyk (to Kudrivka)

=== Hirnyk-Sport Horishni Plavni ===
In:

No.	Pos.	Nation	Player
—	MF	(Ukraine) UKR	Vladyslav Molko (on loan from Kremin Kremenchuk)
—	DF	(Ukraine) UKR	Oleksandr Kalchuk (on loan from Kremin Kremenchuk)
—	MF	(Ukraine) UKR	Yehor Petrov (from Mariupol)
—	MF	(Ukraine) UKR	Danylo Dmytriyev (from Mariupol)
—	MF	(Nigeria) NGA	Ekemini Nsini Effiong (from Mykolaiv)

Out:

No.	Pos.	Nation	Player
7	MF	(Ukraine) UKR	Artem Syomka (Released)
44	DF	(Ukraine) UKR	Semen Datsenko (to Ahrobiznes Volochysk)

=== Inhulets Petrove ===
In:

No.	Pos.	Nation	Player
—	MF	(Ukraine) UKR	Mykhaylo Shershen (from Metalist 1925 Kharkiv)
—	DF	(Ukraine) UKR	Stanislav-Nuri Malysh (from Skoruk Tomakivka)
—	MF	(Ukraine) UKR	Oleksandr Pyatov (from (Poland) Olimpia Zambrów)

Out:

No.	Pos.	Nation	Player

=== Karpaty Lviv ===
In:

No.	Pos.	Nation	Player
—	MF	(Ukraine) UKR	Kyrylo Matvyeyev (from Kremin Kremenchuk)
—	MF	(Ukraine) UKR	Yan Kostenko (from Poltava)

Out:

No.	Pos.	Nation	Player

=== Kremin Kremenchuk ===
In:

No.	Pos.	Nation	Player

Out:

No.	Pos.	Nation	Player
69	GK	(Ukraine) UKR	Daniil Yermolov (to Vorskla Poltava)
19	MF	(Ukraine) UKR	Vladyslav Molko (on loan to Hirnyk-Sport Horishni Plavni)
46	DF	(Ukraine) UKR	Oleksandr Kalchuk (on loan to Hirnyk-Sport Horishni Plavni)
21	MF	(Ukraine) UKR	Danylo Falkovskyi (to Metalurh Zaporizhzhia)
20	FW	(Ukraine) UKR	Denys Halata (on loan to Metalurh Zaporizhzhia)
14	MF	(Ukraine) UKR	Kyrylo Matvyeyev (to Karpaty Lviv)

=== Mariupol ===
In:

No.	Pos.	Nation	Player

Out:

No.	Pos.	Nation	Player
14	MF	(Ukraine) UKR	Yehor Petrov (to Hirnyk-Sport Horishni Plavni)
39	MF	(Ukraine) UKR	Danylo Dmytriyev (to Hirnyk-Sport Horishni Plavni)

=== Metalurh Zaporizhzhia ===
In:

No.	Pos.	Nation	Player
—	MF	(Ukraine) UKR	Danylo Falkovskyi (from Kremin Kremenchuk)
—	FW	(Ukraine) UKR	Denys Halata (on loan from Kremin Kremenchuk)

Out:

No.	Pos.	Nation	Player

=== Poltava ===
In:

No.	Pos.	Nation	Player
—	GK	(Ukraine) UKR	Ihor Vartsaba (from Skoruk Tomakivka)
—	DF	(Ukraine) UKR	Vladyslav Klymenko (from Inhulets Petrove)
—	DF	(Ukraine) UKR	Illya Khodulya (from Skoruk Tomakivka)
—	DF	(Ukraine) UKR	Ihor Kotsyumaka (from Skoruk Tomakivka)
—	DF	(Ukraine) UKR	Oleksandr Migunov (from Skoruk Tomakivka)
—	MF	(Ukraine) UKR	Artem Perebora (from Skoruk Tomakivka)
—	MF	(Ukraine) UKR	Dmytro Plakhtyr (from Skoruk Tomakivka)
—	MF	(Ukraine) UKR	Svyatoslav Shapovalov (from Skoruk Tomakivka)
—	FW	(Ukraine) UKR	Vladyslav Garnaga (from Skoruk Tomakivka)
—	DF	(Ukraine) UKR	Roman Lyopka (from Karpaty Lviv)
—	DF	(Ukraine) UKR	Yevhen Opanasenko (from Kryvbas Kryvyi Rih)

Out:

No.	Pos.	Nation	Player
7	FW	(Ukraine) UKR	Yevgen Drozd (Released)
14	MF	(Russia) RUS	Sergey Karetnik (Released)
26	MF	(Ukraine) UKR	Yan Kostenko (to Poltava)
71	GK	(Ukraine) UKR	Yan Vichnyi (Released)

=== Prykarpattia Ivano-Frankivsk ===
In:

No.	Pos.	Nation	Player

Out:

No.	Pos.	Nation	Player
7	MF	(Ukraine) UKR	Roman Kuzmyn (to Ahrobiznes Volochysk)
2	DF	(Ukraine) UKR	Volodymyr Radulskyi (to Probiy)
19	MF	(Ukraine) UKR	Rostyslav Voloshynovych (to Probiy)
21	MF	(Ukraine) UKR	Ivan Sondey (to Probiy)
31	MF	(Ukraine) UKR	Roman Borysevych (to Probiy)

== Ukrainian Second League ==
=== FC Kudrivka ===
In:

No.	Pos.	Nation	Player
—	DF	(Ukraine) UKR	Volodymyr Zubashivskyi (from Chernihiv)
—	DF	(Ukraine) UKR	Oleksandr Rudenko (from Chernihiv)
—	DF	(Ukraine) UKR	Volodymyr Plastun (from SC Chaika)
—	DF	(Ukraine) UKR	Danylo Garmash (from Vorskla Poltava)
—	MF	(Ukraine) UKR	Myroslav Serdyuk (from Chernihiv)
—	MF	(Ukraine) UKR	Mykola Syrash (from Chernihiv)
—	MF	(Ukraine) UKR	Denys Skepskyi (from Niva Buzova)
—	MF	(Ukraine) UKR	Bogdan Lyanskoronskyi (from Nyva Ternopil)
—	MF	(Ukraine) UKR	Maksym Leshchenko (from SC Chaika)
—	MF	(Ukraine) UKR	Dmytro Zhykol (from Sokil Lviv)
—	FW	(Ukraine) UKR	Dmytro Kulyk (from Chernihiv)

Out:

No.	Pos.	Nation	Player
—	MF	(Ukraine) UKR	Oleksandr Iosha (Released)

=== Real Pharma Odesa ===
In:

No.	Pos.	Nation	Player

Out:

No.	Pos.	Nation	Player
2	DF	(Ukraine) UKR	Yevhenii Ratushniak (Released)
15	MF	(Ukraine) UKR	Vitalii Miachyn (to Ahrobiznes Volochysk)
16	MF	(Ukraine) UKR	Mykyta Koshkin (Released)

== Omitted teams from the Ukrainian First League ==
=== Skoruk Tomakivka ===
In:

No.	Pos.	Nation	Player

Out:

No.	Pos.	Nation	Player
2	DF	(Ukraine) UKR	Stanislav-Nuri Malysh (to Inhulets Petrove)

== Regional Leagues ==
=== Mykolaiv ===
In:

No.	Pos.	Nation	Player

Out:

No.	Pos.	Nation	Player
—	MF	(Nigeria) NGA	Ekemini Nsini Effiong (to Hirnyk-Sport Horishni Plavni)
