= 2023–24 FC Kudrivka season =

Kudrivka
2023–24 season
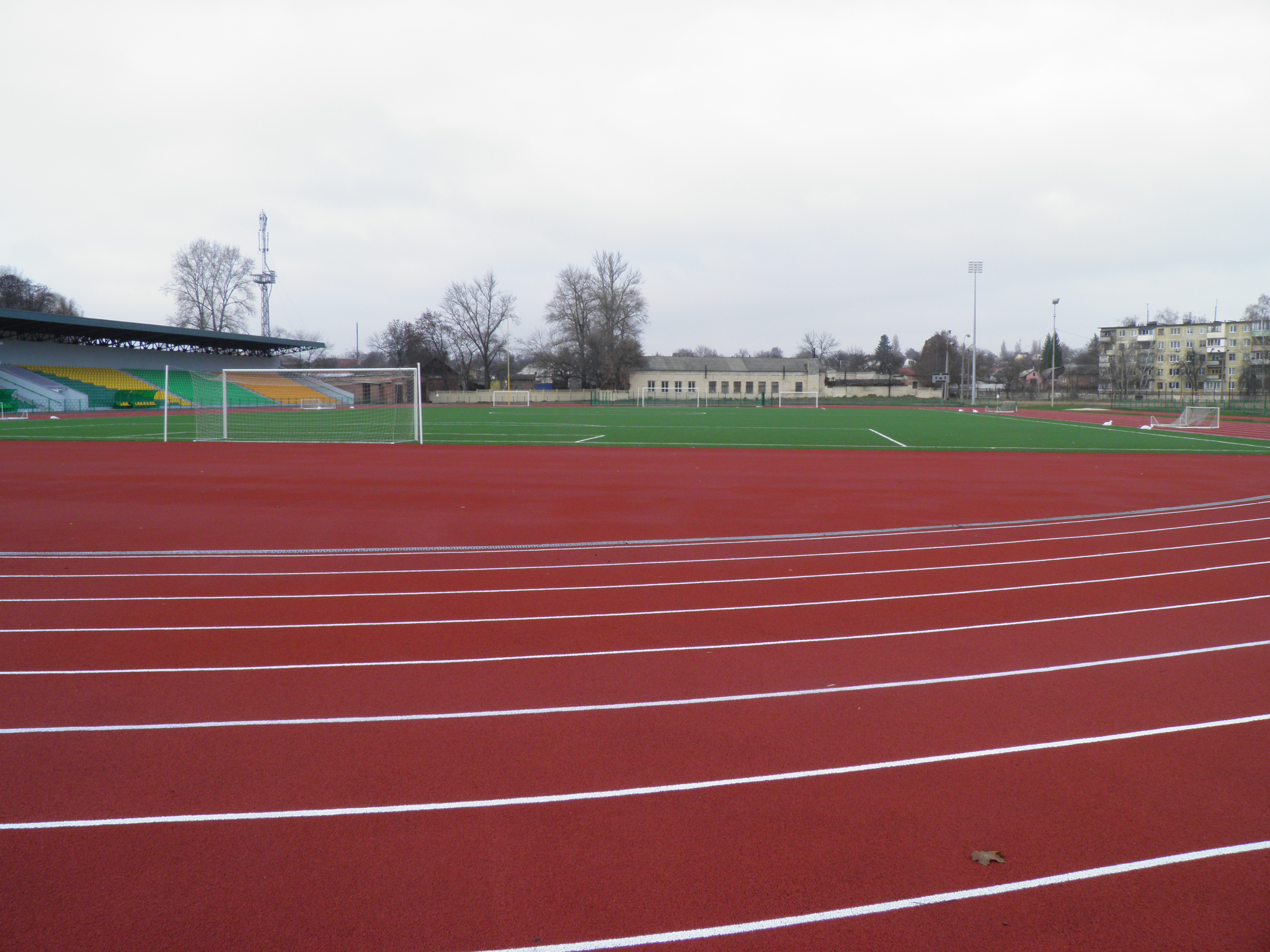
- Owner: Roman Solodarenko
- Chairman: Roman Solodarenko
- Manager: Serhiy Datsenko (until 21 november 2023); Roman Loktionov (from november 2023, until 25 January 2024); Vasyl Baranov (from 26 January 2024, until 12 June 2024)
- Stadium: Yunist Stadium; Kudrivka Arena
- Ukrainian Second League: 7th Promotion to Ukrainian First League through merger
- Ukrainian Cup: Round of 32 (1/16)
- Top goalscorer: League: Volodymyr Koval (6); All: Volodymyr Koval (6)
- Biggest win: Kudrivka 4-2 Kremin-2
- Biggest defeat: Kudrivka 1-7 UCSA
| Home colours | Away colours | Third colours |

During the 2023–24 season, FC Kudrivka competed in the Ukrainian Second League.

== Season summary ==
The club during this season mainly used the Kudrivka Arena in Kudrivka and the Yunist Stadium in Chernihiv. In November 2023, head coach Serhiy Datsenko resigned from his position as head coach by mutual agreement with the club. Roman Loktionov was appointed as new manager of the club. On 25 November, the club's president, Roman Solodarenko, announced that the club would relocate to Irpin in 2024. Dmytro Kulyk scored 4 goals in the Ukrainian Cup, becoming the top scorer in the competition together with Andriy Shtohrin.

== Players ==
=== Squad information ===
As of 18 April 2025

| Squad no. | Name | Nationality | Position | Date of birth (age) |
Goalkeepers
| 1 | Andriy Sledzevskyi | (Ukraine) | GK | 4 April 2000 (aged 23) |
| 12 | Ivan Kryknin | (Ukraine) | GK | 11 September 1991 (aged 32) |
| 12 | Mykhaylo Pruglo | (Ukraine) | GK | 24 March 2005 (aged 18) |
| 31 | Denys Fert | (Ukraine) | GK | 12 September 2002 (aged 21) |
Defenders
| 2 | Oleksandr Rudenko | (Ukraine) | DF | 24 October 1998 (aged 25) |
| 3 | Pavlo Shchedrakov | (Ukraine) | DF | 27 July 1985 (aged 38) |
| 5 | Maksym Leshchenko | (Ukraine) | DF | 29 April 1993 (aged 31) |
| 6 | Nikita Zdorenko | (Ukraine) | DF | 21 June 2000 (aged 24) |
| 17 | Myroslav Serdyuk | (Ukraine) | DF | 27 July 1999 (aged 24) |
| 20 | Volodymyr Plastun | (Ukraine) | DF | 24 November 1991 (aged 32) |
| 26 | Mykyta Baranov | (Ukraine) | DF | 16 December 2004 (aged 19) |
| 27 | Stanislav Pestretsov | (Ukraine) | DF | 30 December 2003 (aged 20) |
| 33 | Artem Vasko | (Ukraine) | DF | 7 June 2000 (aged 24) |
| 68 | Mykyta Mykhaylenko | (Ukraine) | DF | 14 March 2002 (aged 22) |
Midfielders
| 6 | Mykola Vechurko | (Ukraine) | MF | 1 October 1998 (aged 25) |
| 6 | Yevhen Chepurnenko | (Ukraine) | MF | 6 September 1989 (aged 34) |
| 8 | Denys Skepskyi | (Ukraine) | MF | 5 July 1987 (aged 37) |
| 8 | Parviz Rustamov | (Ukraine) | MF | 6 October 2004 (aged 19) |
| 9 | Mykyta Makhynya | (Ukraine) | MF | 16 January 2003 (aged 21) |
| 10 | Oleksandr Yevtushenko | (Ukraine) | MF | 6 March 2003 (aged 21) |
| 13 | Dmytro Zhykol | (Ukraine) | MF | 26 January 1995 (aged 29) |
| 13 | Kyrylo Kovalenko | (Ukraine) | MF | 10 September 1999 (aged 24) |
| 14 | Oleksandr Dolgopyatov | (Ukraine) | MF | 30 July 1997 (aged 26) |
| 22 | Glib Teteruk | (Ukraine) | MF | 17 August 2001 (aged 22) |
| 22 | Yegor Koval | (Ukraine) | MF | 7 March 2003 (aged 21) |
| 26 | Bogdan Lyanskoronskyi | (Ukraine) | MF | 10 October 2004 (aged 19) |
| 33 | Vladyslav Ivashchyk | (Ukraine) | MF | 24 July 2001 (aged 22) |
| 68 | Mykola Syrash | (Ukraine) | MF | 7 February 1999 (aged 25) |
| 77 | Vladyslav Kyryn | (Ukraine) | MF | 3 November 2001 (aged 22) |
| 77 | Vladyslav Zorenko | (Ukraine) | MF | 7 February 1999 (aged 25) |
| 99 | Volodymyr Zubashivskyi | (Ukraine) | MF | 28 February 1999 (aged 25) |
Forwards
| 7 | Dmytro Kulyk | (Ukraine) | FW | 26 January 2001 (aged 23) |
| 7 | Artem Lyehostayev | (Ukraine) | FW | 11 August 2002 (aged 21) |
| 9 | Danyil Strochynskyi | (Ukraine) | FW | 12 September 2001 (aged 22) |
| 10 | Oleksandr Yevtushenko | (Ukraine) | FW | 6 March 2003 (aged 21) |
| 10 | Volodymyr Koval | (Ukraine) | FW | 6 March 1992 (aged 32) |
| 11 | Roman Solodarenko | (Ukraine) | FW | 26 January 1984 (aged 40) |
| 14 | Oleksandr Dolgopyatov | (Ukraine) | FW | 20 July 1997 (aged 26) |
| 24 | Nazar Voloshyn | (Ukraine) | FW | 4 September 2000 (aged 23) |
| 27 | Viktor Berko | (Ukraine) | FW | 21 September 1992 (aged 31) |
| 27 | Danylo Garmash | (Ukraine) | FW | 4 June 2004 (aged 20) |

== Management team ==
| Position | Name | Year appointed | Last club/team |
|---|---|---|---|
| Manager | (Ukraine) Serhiy Datsenko | 2023 | Kudrivka (assistant) |
| Manager | (Ukraine) Roman Loktionov | 2023-2024 | Kremin-2 Kremenchuk |
| Manager | (Ukraine) Vasyl Baranov | 2024- | Vorskla Poltava (assistant) |
| Assistant Manager | (Ukraine) Dmytro Nazarenko | 2023- | Kremin Kremenchuk (assistant) |
| Goalkeeping Coach | (Ukraine) Yuriy Ovcharov | 2022- | Desna Chernihiv (Goalkeeping Coach) |

== Transfers ==
=== In ===
| Date | Pos. | Player | Age | Moving from | Type | Fee | Source |
Summer
| 29 June 2023 | DF | (Ukraine) Oleksandr Rudenko | 28 | (Ukraine) Chernihiv | Transfer | Free | |
| 29 June 2023 | FW | (Ukraine) Dmytro Kulyk | 28 | (Ukraine) Chernihiv | Transfer | Free | |
| 29 June 2023 | DF | (Ukraine) Myroslav Serdyuk | 28 | (Ukraine) Chernihiv | Transfer | Free | |
| 29 June 2023 | MF | (Ukraine) Volodymyr Zubashivskyi | 28 | (Ukraine) Chernihiv | Transfer | Free | |
| 29 June 2023 | MF | (Ukraine) Mykola Syrash | 28 | (Ukraine) Chernihiv | Transfer | Free | |
| 29 June 2023 | MF | (Ukraine) Denys Skepskyi | 28 | (Ukraine) Niva Buzova | Transfer | Free | |
| 29 June 2023 | MF | (Ukraine) Bogdan Lyanskoronskyi | 28 | (Ukraine) Nyva Ternopil | Transfer | Free | |
| 29 June 2023 | MF | (Ukraine) Maksym Leshchenko | 28 | (Ukraine) SC Chaika | Transfer | Free | |
| 29 June 2023 | MF | (Ukraine) Dmytro Zhykol | 28 | (Ukraine) Sokil Lviv | Transfer | Free | |
| 29 June 2023 | DF | (Ukraine) Volodymyr Plastun | 28 | (Ukraine) SC Chaika | Transfer | Free | |
| 29 June 2023 | DF | (Ukraine) Danylo Garmash | 28 | (Ukraine) Vorskla Poltava | Transfer | Free | |
| 29 June 2023 | MF | (Ukraine) Vladyslav Kyryn | 28 | Unattached | Transfer | Free | |
| 29 June 2023 | MF | (Ukraine) Viktor Berko | 28 | Unattached | Transfer | Free | |
| 29 June 2023 | GK | (Ukraine) Denys Fert | 28 | Unattached | Transfer | Free | |
| 29 June 2023 | MF | (Ukraine) Yevhen Chepurnenko | 28 | Unattached | Transfer | Free | |
| 29 June 2023 | FW | (Ukraine) Volodymyr Koval | 28 | Unattached | Transfer | Free | |
| 1 August 2023 | FW | (Ukraine) Nazar Voloshyn | 28 | Unattached | Transfer | Free | |
Winter
| 24 January 2024 | MF | (Ukraine) Ivan Sklyarenko | 23 | (Ukraine) Druzhba Myrivka | Transfer | Free | |
| 24 January 2024 | FW | (Ukraine) Oleksandr Yevtushenko | 21 | (Ukraine) Olimpiya Savyntsi | Transfer | Free | |

=== Out ===
| Date | Pos. | Player | Age | Moving from | Type | Fee | Source |
Summer
| 17 July 2023 | MF | (Ukraine) Oleksandr Iosha | 30 | Unattached | Transfer | Free | |
Winter
| 31 January 2024 | DF | (Ukraine) Oleksandr Rudenko | 29 | (Ukraine) Skala Stryi | Transfer | Free | |
| 31 January 2024 | MF | (Ukraine) Mykola Syrash | 29 | (Ukraine) Khust | Transfer | Free | |
| 31 January 2024 | FW | (Ukraine) Dmytro Kulyk | 29 | (Ukraine) Nyva Buzova | Transfer | Free | |
| 31 January 2024 | DF | (Ukraine) Myroslav Serdyuk | 29 | (Ukraine) Nyva Buzova | Transfer | Free | |
| 31 January 2024 | MF | (Ukraine) Bogdan Lyanskoronskyi | 29 | (Ukraine) Chernihiv | Transfer | Free | |
| 31 January 2024 | MF | (Ukraine) Yevhen Chepurnenko | 29 | (Ukraine) Nyva Buzova | Transfer | Free | |
| 31 January 2024 | DF | (Ukraine) Ivan Kryknin | 29 | Unattached | Transfer | Free | |
| 31 January 2024 | MF | (Ukraine) Vladyslav Kyryn | 29 | Unattached | Transfer | Free | |
| 31 January 2024 | MF | (Ukraine) Denys Skepskyi | 29 | (Ukraine) Lisne | Transfer | Free | |
| 31 January 2024 | MF | (Ukraine) Danyil Strochynskyi | 29 | Unattached | Transfer | Free | |
| 31 January 2024 | MF | (Ukraine) Glib Teteruk | 29 | Unattached | Transfer | Free | |
| 31 January 2024 | MF | (Ukraine) Valentyn Krukovets | 29 | Retired | Transfer | Free | |
| 31 January 2024 | FW | (Ukraine) Viktor Berko | 29 | Retired | Transfer | Free | |
| 31 January 2024 | FW | (Ukraine) Volodymyr Koval | 29 | Lisne | Transfer | Free | |
| 31 January 2024 | FW | (Ukraine) Pavlo Shchedrakov | 29 | Retired | Transfer | Free | |

== Competitions ==
=== Overall record ===
| Competition | First match | Last match | Starting round | Record | | | | | | | |
| Competition | First match | Last match | Starting round | Pld | W | D | L | GF | GA | GD | Win % |
|---|---|---|---|---|---|---|---|---|---|---|---|
| Second League | 18 September 2023 | 26 May 2024 | Matchday 1 | 21 | 8 | 6 | 7 | 24 | 34 | −10 | 38.10 |
| Ukrainian Cup | 29 July 2023 | 12 August 2024 | | 3 | 2 | 0 | 1 | 7 | 2 | +5 | 66.67 |
| Total | | | | 24 | 10 | 6 | 8 | 31 | 36 | −5 | 41.67 |

Last updated: April 2025
Source: Results

=== Results ===
| 18 September 2023 1 | Kudrivka | 1–0 | SC Chaika | Kudrivka |
| EEST (UTC+3) | Koval 75' | Report | | Stadium: Kudrivka Arena |

| 24 September 2023 2 | UCSA | 3–0 | Kudrivka | Kyiv |
| EEST (UTC+3) | | | | Stadium: Bannikov Stadium |

| 24 September 2023 3 | Kudrivka | 3–1 | Real Pharma Odesa | Kudrivka |
| EEST (UTC+3) | | Report | | Stadium: Kudrivka Arena |

| 6 October 2023 4 | Metalurh-2 Zaporizhzhia | 1–2 | Kudrivka | Kochubeivka |
| EEST (UTC+3) | | | | Stadium: Stadium Bazys |

| 11 October 2023 5 | Kudrivka | 0–4 | Zviahel | Kudrivka |
| EEST (UTC+3) | | | | Stadium: Kudrivka Arena |

| 15 October 2023 6 | Druzhba Myrivka | 0–0 | Kudrivka | Kaharlyk |
| EEST (UTC+3) | | | | Stadium: Stadium Druzhba |

| 22 October 2023 7 | Karpaty-2 Lviv | 2–3 | Kudrivka | Dubliany |
| EEST (UTC+3) | | | | Stadium: Stadium Lnau |

| 28 October 2023 8 | Kudrivka | 0–1 | Rukh-2 Lviv | Kudrivka |
| EEST (UTC+3) | | | | Stadium: Kudrivka Arena |

| 5 November 2023 9 | Kudrivka | 1–2 | Skala 1911 Stryi | Kudrivka |
| EEST (UTC+3) | | | | Stadium: Kudrivka Arena |

| 11 November 2023 10 | Vast Mykolaiv | v | Kudrivka |
| EEST (UTC+3) |

| 5 November 2023 11 | Kudrivka | 1–1 | Nyva Vinnytsia | Kudrivka |
| EEST (UTC+3) | | | | Stadium: Kudrivka Arena |

| 23 November 2023 12 | Trostianets | 1–3 | Kudrivka | Chernihiv |
| EEST (UTC+3) | | | | Stadium: Yunist Stadium |

| 31 March 2024 13 | Lokomotyv Kyiv | 0–0 | Kudrivka | Kyiv |
| EEST (UTC+3) | | | | Stadium: Bannikov Stadium |

| 7 April 2024 14 | Kudrivka | 4–2 | Kremin-2 Kremenchuk | Kudrivka |
| EEST (UTC+3) | | Report | | Stadium: Kudrivka Arena |

| 14 April 2024 15 | Trostianets | 1–1 | Kudrivka | Demydiv |
| EEST (UTC+3) | | | | Stadium: Dinaz Stadium |

| 17 April 2024 16 | Kudrivka | 1–7 | UCSA | Kudrivka |
| EEST (UTC+3) | | | | Stadium: Kudrivka Arena |

| 22 April 2024 17 | Real Pharma Odesa | 0–1 | Kudrivka | Odesa |
| EEST (UTC+3) | | | | Stadium: Stadion Fsk Ivan |

| 5 May 2024 18 | Zviahel | 1–1 | Kudrivka | Zviahel |
| EEST (UTC+3) | | | | Stadium: Avanhard Stadium |

| 11 April 2024 19 | Kudrivka | 0–3 | Druzhba Myrivka | Kudrivka |
| EEST (UTC+3) | | | | Stadium: Kudrivka Arena |

| 18 April 2024 20 | Kudrivka | 1–2 | Karpaty-2 Lviv | Kudrivka |
| EEST (UTC+3) | | | | Stadium: Kudrivka Arena |

| 26 May 2024 21 | Rukh-2 Lviv | 2–2 | Kudrivka | Vynnyky |
| EEST (UTC+3) | | | | Stadium: Stadium im. Bohdan Markevycha |

=== Ukrainian Cup ===
| 29 July 2023 Round of 64 (1/32) | Olympia Savyntsi | 0-1 | Kudrivka | Myrhorod |
| EEST (UTC+3) | | Report | Malyk 8' (o.g.) | Stadium: Stadium Start |

| 15 August 2023 Round of 64 (1/32) | Kudrivka | 3-0 | Kremin Kremenchuk | Chernihiv |
| EEST (UTC+3) | Kulyk 16', 62'; Koval 88' | Report | | Stadium: Yunist Stadium; Referee: S.Podryhulya (Lutsk) |

| 12 August 2024 Round of 64 (1/32) | Kudrivka | 2-2 (a.e.t.) (6–7 p) | Mariupol | Kudrivka |
| EEST (UTC+3) | Kulyk 4', 74'; Koval 88' | Report | Penteleychuk 48', 82' (pen.) (penalty missed) 14' | Stadium: Kudrivka Arena; Referee: O.Kohut (Ternopil) |
| | Penalties |
| | Plastun (penalty scored); Strochyskyi (penalty scored); Chepurnenko (penalty scored); Skepskyi (penalty missed); Rudenko (penalty scored); Leshchenko (penalty scored); Teteruk (penalty scored); Kovalenko (penalty missed) | | (penalty scored) Penteleychuk; (penalty scored) Mochevinskyi; (penalty scored) Mamrosenko; (penalty scored) Batalskyi; (penalty missed) Tyeryekhov; (penalty scored) Makhynya; (penalty scored) Bykovskyi; (penalty scored) Melnychenko |

== Statistics ==
=== Appearances and goals ===
| No. | Pos | Nat | Player | Total | | Ukrainian Second League | | Cup | | EL | |
| No. | Pos | Nat | Player | Apps | Goals | Apps | Goals | Apps | Goals | Apps | Goals |
Goalkeepers
| 1 | GK | (Ukraine) UKR | Andriy Sledzevskyi | 1 | 0 | 0 | 0 | 1 | 0 | 0 | 0 |
| 12 | GK | (Ukraine) UKR | Mykhaylo Pruglo | 0 | 0 | 0 | 0 | 0 | 0 | 0 | 0 |
| 31 | GK | (Ukraine) UKR | Denys Fert | 4 | 0 | 4 | 0 | 0 | 0 | 0 | 0 |
Defenders
| 5 | DF | (Ukraine) UKR | Maksym Leshchenko | 18 | 1 | 15 | 1 | 3 | 0 | 0 | 0 |
| 6 | DF | (Ukraine) UKR | Nikita Zdorenko | 7 | 0 | 7 | 0 | 0 | 0 | 0 | 0 |
| 20 | DF | (Ukraine) UKR | Volodymyr Plastun | 21 | 1 | 20 | 1 | 1 | 0 | 0 | 0 |
| 26 | DF | (Ukraine) UKR | Mykyta Baranov | 7 | 0 | 7 | 0 | 0 | 0 | 0 | 0 |
| 27 | DF | (Ukraine) UKR | Stanislav Pestretsov | 8 | 0 | 8 | 0 | 0 | 0 | 0 | 0 |
| 33 | DF | (Ukraine) UKR | Artem Vasko | 7 | 1 | 7 | 1 | 0 | 0 | 0 | 0 |
| 68 | DF | (Ukraine) UKR | Mykyta Mykhaylenko | 9 | 0 | 9 | 0 | 0 | 0 | 0 | 0 |
Midfielders
| 8 | MF | (Ukraine) UKR | Parviz Rustamov | 6 | 0 | 6 | 0 | 0 | 0 | 0 | 0 |
| 9 | MF | (Ukraine) UKR | Mykyta Makhynya | 8 | 0 | 8 | 0 | 0 | 0 | 0 | 0 |
| 10 | MF | (Ukraine) UKR | Oleksandr Yevtushenko | 10 | 2 | 9 | 2 | 1 | 0 | 0 | 0 |
| 13 | MF | (Ukraine) UKR | Dmytro Zhykol | 12 | 2 | 9 | 2 | 3 | 0 | 0 | 0 |
| 13 | MF | (Ukraine) UKR | Kyrylo Kovalenko | 15 | 0 | 13 | 0 | 2 | 0 | 0 | 0 |
| 14 | MF | (Ukraine) UKR | Oleksandr Dolgopyatov | 18 | 0 | 18 | 0 | 0 | 0 | 0 | 0 |
| 22 | MF | (Ukraine) UKR | Glib Teteruk | 8 | 0 | 5 | 0 | 3 | 0 | 0 | 0 |
| 22 | MF | (Ukraine) UKR | Yegor Koval | 5 | 1 | 5 | 1 | 0 | 0 | 0 | 0 |
| 33 | MF | (Ukraine) UKR | Vladyslav Ivashchyk | 17 | 0 | 16 | 0 | 1 | 0 | 0 | 0 |
| 77 | MF | (Ukraine) UKR | Vladyslav Zorenko | 6 | 0 | 6 | 0 | 0 | 0 | 0 | 0 |
Forwards
| 7 | FW | (Ukraine) UKR | Artem Lyehostayev | 0 | 0 | 0 | 0 | 0 | 0 | 0 | 0 |
| 9 | FW | (Ukraine) UKR | Danyil Strochynskyi | 23 | 1 | 20 | 1 | 3 | 0 | 0 | 0 |
| 11 | FW | (Ukraine) UKR | Roman Solodarenko | 0 | 0 | 0 | 0 | 0 | 0 | 0 | 0 |
| 24 | FW | (Ukraine) UKR | Nazar Voloshyn | 23 | 6 | 22 | 6 | 1 | 0 | 0 | 0 |
| 83 | FW | (Ukraine) UKR | Danylo Garmash | 21 | 4 | 20 | 4 | 1 | 0 | 0 | 0 |
Players transferred out during the season
| 2 | DF | (Ukraine) UKR | Oleksandr Rudenko | 19 | 0 | 16 | 0 | 3 | 0 | 0 | 0 |
| 3 | DF | (Ukraine) UKR | Pavlo Shchedrakov | 12 | 2 | 10 | 2 | 2 | 0 | 0 | 0 |
| 6 | MF | (Ukraine) UKR | Yevhen Chepurnenko | 17 | 4 | 14 | 4 | 3 | 0 | 0 | 0 |
| 7 | FW | (Ukraine) UKR | Dmytro Kulyk | 18 | 6 | 15 | 2 | 3 | 4 | 0 | 0 |
| 8 | MF | (Ukraine) UKR | Denys Skepskyi | 20 | 3 | 17 | 3 | 3 | 0 | 0 | 0 |
| 11 | FW | (Ukraine) UKR | Volodymyr Koval | 15 | 7 | 12 | 6 | 3 | 1 | 0 | 0 |
| 12 | GK | (Ukraine) UKR | Ivan Kryknin | 15 | 0 | 13 | 0 | 2 | 0 | 0 | 0 |
| 17 | DF | (Ukraine) UKR | Myroslav Serdyuk | 18 | 1 | 15 | 1 | 3 | 0 | 0 | 0 |
| 26 | MF | (Ukraine) UKR | Bogdan Lyanskoronskyi | 5 | 0 | 4 | 0 | 1 | 0 | 0 | 0 |
| 27 | FW | (Ukraine) UKR | Viktor Berko | 13 | 1 | 11 | 1 | 2 | 0 | 0 | 0 |
| 68 | MF | (Ukraine) UKR | Mykola Syrash | 19 | 0 | 16 | 0 | 3 | 0 | 0 | 0 |
| 77 | MF | (Ukraine) UKR | Vladyslav Kyryn | 0 | 0 | 0 | 0 | 0 | 0 | 0 | 0 |
| 99 | MF | (Ukraine) UKR | Volodymyr Zubashivskyi | 3 | 0 | 3 | 0 | 0 | 0 | 0 | 0 |

Source: Competitions

Last updated: 18 April 2025

=== Goalscorers ===
| Rank | No. | Pos | Nat | Name | Second League | Cup | Europa League | Total |
|---|---|---|---|---|---|---|---|---|
| 1 | 11 | MF | (Ukraine) | Volodymyr Koval | 6 | 1 | 0 | 7 |
| 2 | 7 | FW | (Ukraine) | Dmytro Kulyk | 2 | 4 | 0 | 6 |
| 3 | 24 | FW | (Ukraine) | Nazar Voloshyn | 6 | 0 | 0 | 6 |
| 3 | 83 | FW | (Ukraine) | Danylo Garmash | 4 | 0 | 0 | 4 |
| 4 | 8 | MF | (Ukraine) | Denys Skepskyi | 3 | 0 | 0 | 3 |
| 5 | 10 | MF | (Ukraine) | Oleksandr Yevtushenko | 2 | 0 | 0 | 2 |
| 6 | 13 | MF | (Ukraine) | Dmytro Zhykol | 2 | 0 | 0 | 2 |
| 7 | 3 | DF | (Ukraine) | Pavlo Shchedrakov | 2 | 0 | 0 | 2 |
| 9 | 5 | DF | (Ukraine) | Maksym Leshchenko | 1 | 0 | 0 | 1 |
| 10 | 20 | DF | (Ukraine) | Volodymyr Plastun | 1 | 0 | 0 | 1 |
| 11 | 33 | DF | (Ukraine) | Artem Vasko | 1 | 0 | 0 | 1 |
| 12 | 22 | MF | (Ukraine) | Yegor Koval | 1 | 0 | 0 | 1 |
| 13 | 9 | FW | (Ukraine) | Danyil Strochynskyi | 1 | 0 | 0 | 1 |
| 14 | 17 | MF | (Ukraine) | Myroslav Serdyuk | 1 | 0 | 0 | 1 |
| 15 | 27 | FW | (Ukraine) | Viktor Berko | 1 | 0 | 0 | 1 |
| | | | | Total | 34 | 5 | 0 | 39 |

Last updated: 29 August 2025

=== Clean sheets ===
| Rank | No. | Pos | Nat | Name | Second League | Cup | Europa League | Total |
|---|---|---|---|---|---|---|---|---|
| 1 | 12 | GK | (Ukraine) | Ivan Kryknin | 4 | 1 | 0 | 5 |
| 2 | 1 | GK | (Ukraine) | Andriy Sledzevskyi | 1 | 1 | 0 | 2 |
| 3 | 31 | GK | (Ukraine) | Denys Fert | 1 | 0 | 0 | 1 |
| | | | | Total | 6 | 2 | 0 | 8 |

Last updated: 19 April 2025
