= Dmytro Kulyk =

Ukrainian footballer (born 2002)

Personal information
- Date of birth: 26 January 2001 (age 25)
- Place of birth: Chernihiv, Ukraine
- Height: 1.87 m (6 ft 2 in)
- Position: Forward

Team information
- Current team: Chernihiv
- Number: 9

Youth career
- 2016: Yunist Chernihiv
- 2016–2017: RVUFK Kyiv

Senior career*
Years	Team	Apps	(Gls)
2018–2019	Chernihiv	0	(0)
2019	Zorya-2 Luhansk	25	(11)
2020–2022	Kudrivka	10	(2)
2022–2023	Chernihiv	19	(3)
2023	Kudrivka	15	(2)
2024	Nyva Buzova	7	(0)
2024	Dinaz Vyshhorod	12	(1)
2025–	Chernihiv	20	(2)
- * Club domestic league appearances and goals as of 1 June 2026

Dmytro Kulyk (Ukrainian: Дмитро Кулик; born 26 January 2002) is a Ukrainian professional footballer who plays as a forward for Chernihiv.

== Career ==
Kulyk started to play for Yunist Chernihiv, RVUFK KyivPiddubny Olympic College, Zorya-2 Luhansk and Kudrivka.

=== FC Chernihiv ===
On 25 August 2022, Kulyk signed for FC Chernihiv. On 27 August he made his debut in Ukrainian First League against Skoruk Tomakivka. On 23 October 2022, he scored his first goal with the new club against Hirnyk-Sport Horishni Plavni at the Yunist Stadium in Chernihiv.

=== Kudrivka ===
In the summer of 2023 Kulyk moved again to Kudrivka, who had just been promoted to the Ukrainian Second League. He scored 3 goals in the league and 4 goals in the Ukrainian Cup, becoming the top scorer together with Andriy Shtohrin.

=== Nyva Buzova ===
In March 2024 Kulyk moved to Nyva Buzova where he played 7 matches.

=== Dinaz Vyshhorod ===
In summer 2024 Kulyk moved to Dinaz Vyshhorod in Ukrainian First League. On 17 November he scored his first goal against Kremin at the Dinaz Stadium in Demydiv.

=== Second spell at FC Chernihiv ===
On 22 January 2025, Kulyk moved to Chernihiv in Ukrainian Second League. On 11 April 2025, he made his debut with the new club against Lokomotyv Kyiv at the Bannikov Stadium in Kyiv. On 11 May 2025, he scored his first goal with the new club against Oleksandriya-2 at the Olimp Stadium in Oleksandriia. On 30 May 2025, he scored the winning goal in the first leg of the Play-Offs against Skala Stryi. On 26 November 2025, Kulyk signed a new contract extension with FC Chernihiv.

== Career statistics ==
As of match played 1 June 2026

Appearances and goals by club, season and competition
Club	Season	League			Cup		Europe		Other		Total	
Club	Season	Division	Apps	Goals	Apps	Goals	Apps	Goals	Apps	Goals	Apps	Goals
Chernihiv	2019	Championship of Chernihiv Oblast	0	0	2	0	0	0	0	0	2	0
Zorya-2 Luhansk	2019	Championship of Luhansk Oblast	12	6	2	0	0	0	0	0	14	6
Zorya-2 Luhansk	2019–20	Championship of Luhansk Oblast	13	5	2	0	0	0	0	0	15	5
Kudrivka	2020–21	Ukrainian Amateur League	8	2	0	0	0	0	0	0	8	2
Kudrivka	2021–22	Ukrainian Amateur League	0	0	0	0	0	0	0	0	0	0
Chernihiv	2022–23	Ukrainian First League	21	3	0	0	0	0	0	0	21	3
Kudrivka	2023–24	Ukrainian Second League	15	2	3	4	0	0	0	0	18	6
Niva Buzova	2023–24	Ukrainian First League	7	0	0	0	0	0	0	0	7	0
Dinaz Vyshhorod	2024–25	Ukrainian First League	12	1	0	0	0	0	0	0	12	1
Chernihiv	2024–25	Ukrainian Second League	6	1	0	0	0	0	4	1	10	2
Chernihiv	2025–26	Ukrainian First League	14	1	3	0	0	0	0	0	17	1
Chernihiv	2026–27	Ukrainian First League	0	0	0	0	0	0	0	0	0	0
Career total			108	21	12	4	0	0	4	1	124	26

== Honours ==
Kudrivka

- Chernihiv Oblast Football Championship: 2022
- Chernihiv Oblast Football Cup: 2021, 2022
- Chernihiv Oblast Super Cup: 2021, 2022

Chernihiv

- Ukrainian Cup runner-up: 2025–26

Individual

- Ukrainian Cup top scorer: 2023–24 (shared with Andriy Shtohrin)
- Honoured Master of Sport of Ukraine
