= Mykola Syrash =

Ukrainian footballer (born 1999)

Personal information
- Full name: Mykola Anatoliyovych Syrash
- Date of birth: 7 February 1999 (age 27)
- Place of birth: Chernihiv, Ukraine
- Height: 1.74 m (5 ft 9 in)
- Position: Midfielder

Team information
- Current team: Lokomotyv Kyiv
- Number: 5

Youth career
- 2017–2018: Zirka-2 Kropyvnytskyi
- 2018–2019: Avanhard Koriukivka
- 2019–2022: Desna-2 Chernihiv
- 2022: Kudrivka

Senior career*
Years	Team	Apps	(Gls)
2022–2023	Chernihiv	21	(2)
2023	Kudrivka	16	(0)
2024	Khust	6	(0)
2025–	Lokomotyv Kyiv	43	(2)
- * Club domestic league appearances and goals as of 21 November 2026

Mykola Anatoliyovych Syrash (Ukrainian: Микола Анатолійович Сираш; born 7 February 1999) is a Ukrainian professional footballer who plays as a midfielder for Lokomotyv Kyiv in the Ukrainian Second League.

== Playing career ==
In 2018 he signed for Zirka-2 Kropyvnytskyi for two seasons, appearing in 43 matches. In 2020, he signed for Desna-2 Chernihiv, the reserve squad of Desna Chernihiv, for whom he played in 16 matches.

=== FC Chernihiv ===
On 23 August 2022 he signed for FC Chernihiv in the Ukrainian First League. On 27 August he made his debut against Skoruk Tomakivka at the Yunist Stadium in Chernihiv. On 23 October, he scored his first goal with the new club against Hirnyk-Sport Horishni Plavni. In summer 2023 his contract with the club was ended by mutual agreement.

=== Kudrivka & Khust ===
In summer 2023 he moved to Kudrivka in Ukrainian Second League and during the winter transfer he moved to Khust.

=== Lokomotyv Kyiv ===
In summer 2025, he moved to Lokomotyv Kyiv in Ukrainian Second League. On 3 August he made his debut with the new team against Dinaz Vyshhorod at the Dinaz Stadium. On 22 August 2025, he returned to play in the Ukrainian Cup after one year, against Kolos Kovalivka. On 7 November 2025, he scored his first goal in the Ukrainian Second League against Hirnyk-Sport. Due to his performance, he was included in the Best XI of Round 17 of the 2025–26 Ukrainian Second League. On 26 June 2026, he signed a new contract with the club.

== Personal life ==
in May 2024, he was taken to the Military Committee by TCC employees and later sent to study at the National Center Desna, and later he was sent to one of the military units of the Defense Forces in the Kharkiv Oblast in order to help his country against Russian invasion of Ukraine.

== Career statistics ==
=== Club ===
As of match played 21 November 2026

Appearances and goals by club, season and competition
Club	Season	League			Cup		Europe		Other		Total	
Club	Season	Division	Apps	Goals	Apps	Goals	Apps	Goals	Apps	Goals	Apps	Goals
Chernihiv	2022–23	Ukrainian First League	21	2	0	0	0	0	0	0	21	2
Kudrivka	2023–24	Ukrainian Second League	16	0	3	0	0	0	0	0	19	0
Khust	2023–24	Ukrainian First League	6	0	0	0	0	0	0	0	6	0
Lokomotyv Kyiv	2025–26	Ukrainian Second League	28	2	4	0	0	0	1	0	33	2
Lokomotyv Kyiv	2026–27	Ukrainian First League	15	0	1	0	0	0	0	0	16	0
Career total			86	4	8	0	0	0	1	0	95	4

== Honours ==
Lokomotyv Kyiv

- Ukrainian Second League: 2025–26 (Group B)

Kudrivka

- Chernihiv Oblast Football Championship: 2022
- Chernihiv Oblast Football Cup: 2022,
- Chernihiv Oblast Super Cupː 2022
