= FC Polissya Stavky =

- Full name: FC Polissya Stavky
- Founded: 1988
- Ground: Stavky-Arena stadium
- Chairman: Valeriy Los
- Manager: Yaroslav Klymchuk
- League: Ukrainian Amateur League
- 2024–25: Ukrainian Amateur League 4th
- Website: https://fcpolissyastavku.com/

Football club Polissya Stavky (Ukrainian: Футбольний клуб «Полісся» Ставки) is an amateur Ukrainian football club from the village of Stavky, Radomyshl Raion, Zhytomyr Oblast. It has played in the Zhytomyr Region Championship and Cup.

== History ==
=== Founding ===
The club was established in 1988. It played in the Zhytomyr Region Championship and Cup. Since 2022, it has played in the Kyiv Region Higher League.

=== Recent history ===
In 2023, Yaroslav Klymchuk was appointed as head coach. In 2024, the club to reinforce the team signed few experience players such as Vladyslav Horbachenko, Yuriy Malyey and Anton Kalaytan. On 8 August 2025 Polissya Stavky won their first match of Ukrainian Cup against Lehiya Kyiv at the Zmina Stadium. On 25 August the club won the second match of Ukrainian Cup against Rebel Kyiv thanks to the goals of Serhiy Maksymets, Oleksandr Rudenko and Yuriy Malyey and they qualified for the Round of 32 of the Ukrainian Cup for the first time. In September, they were eliminated by Shakhtar Donetsk at the Stadion Yuvileinyi in Bucha.

== Stadium ==
The club hosts its home matches at the Stavky-Arena stadium.

== Players ==
=== Current squad ===
As of 25 September 2025

Note: Flags indicate national team as defined under FIFA eligibility rules; some limited exceptions apply. Players may hold more than one non-FIFA nationality.

No.	Pos.	Nation	Player
3	DF	UKR	Nazariy Shevchenko
5	DF	UKR	Anatoliy Chornomaz
7	MF	UKR	Denys Balatskyi
8	MF	UKR	Oleksandr Chernetskyi
9	FW	UKR	Sergiy Panfilov
11	FW	UKR	Bogdan Koziy
15	MF	UKR	Serhiy Siminin
17	MF	UKR	Kyrylo Duchev
18	MF	UKR	Sergiy Pichugin
19	MF	UKR	Maksym Holovko
20	MF	UKR	Vladyslav Zheliznyak
22	MF	UKR	Serhiy Horbunov
23	DF	UKR	Dmytro Masalyov

No.	Pos.	Nation	Player
24	FW	UKR	Vladyslav Horbachenko
27	MF	UKR	Yuriy Malyey
33	GK	UKR	Roman Pazenko
42	GK	UKR	Svyatoslav Voznyi
44	MF	UKR	Sergiy Maksymets
55	DF	UKR	Vladyslav Bernatskyi
70	FW	UKR	Dmytro Borodenko
77	DF	UKR	Dmytro Melnychuk
88	DF	UKR	Oleksandr Rudenko
94	DF	UKR	Oleksandr Klymchuk
98	FW	UKR	Anton Kalaytan
99	MF	UKR	Yevhen Zadoya

=== Out on loan ===
Note: Flags indicate national team as defined under FIFA eligibility rules; some limited exceptions apply. Players may hold more than one non-FIFA nationality.

No. / Pos. / Nation / Player	No. / Pos. / Nation / Player

=== Other players under contract ===
Note: Flags indicate national team as defined under FIFA eligibility rules; some limited exceptions apply. Players may hold more than one non-FIFA nationality.

No. / Pos. / Nation / Player	No. / Pos. / Nation / Player

== Personnel ==
Position	Staff
President	(Ukraine) Valeriy Los
Head coach	(Ukraine) Yaroslav Klymchuk

== League and cup history ==
Season	Div.	Pos.	Pl.	W	D	L	GS	GA	P	Domestic Cup	Other	Notes
2025–26	regional competitions (Zhytomyr Oblast)									1/32 finals		

== Notable players ==
Players who have played in Polissya Stavky and who have played in some higher leagues above the Ukrainian Amateur League.

- (Ukraine) Andriy Poltavtsev
- (Ukraine) Serhiy Siminin
- (Ukraine) Serhiy Horbunov
- (Ukraine) Roman Adamenko
- (Ukraine) Vladyslav Horbachenko
- (Ukraine) Dmytro Ivanov
- (Ukraine) Yuriy Malyey
- (Ukraine) Anton Kalaytan
- (Ukraine) Yaroslav Oliinyk
- (Ukraine) Navid Nasimi
- (Ukraine) Yevhen Zadoya
- (Ukraine) Oleksiy Zenchenko
