= Anton Kalaytan =

Ukrainian footballer

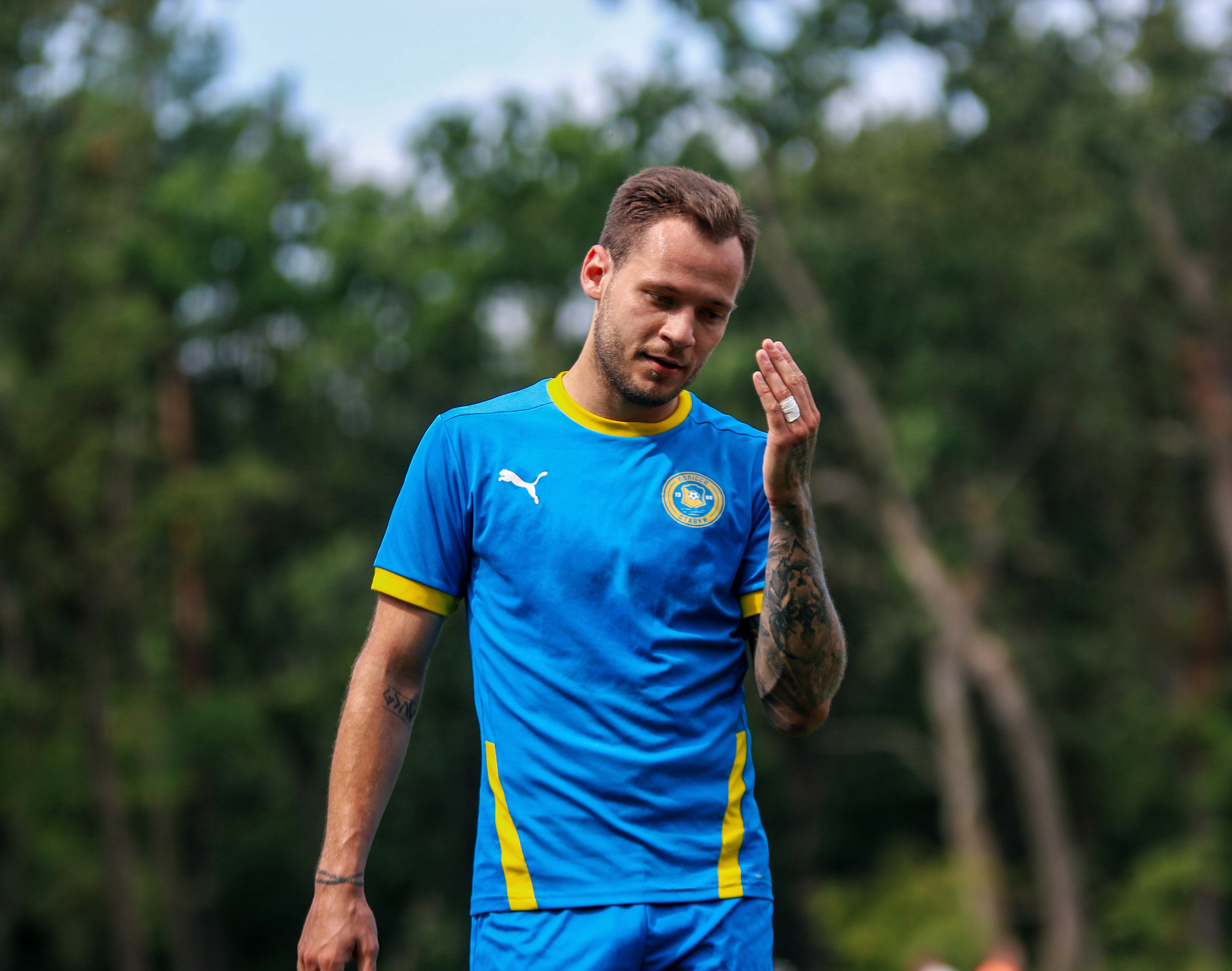

Personal information
- Full name: Anton Yuriyovych Kalaytan
- Date of birth: 12 November 1998 (age 27)
- Place of birth: Kyiv, Ukraine
- Height: 1.80 m (5 ft 11 in)
- Position: Right winger

Team information
- Current team: Polissya Stavky
- Number: 98

Youth career
- 2007: A. Konkova Start Kyiv
- 2008: Arsenal-2 Kyiv
- 2009–2015: Arsenal Kyiv
- 2015: CSKA Kyiv
- 2015–2016: Steaua București

Senior career*
Years	Team	Apps	(Gls)
2014	Arsenal Kyiv	2	(0)
2017	Astra II Giurgiu		
2017–2019	Tennis Borussia Berlin		
2019	Rubikon Kyiv	7	(1)
2020–2021	Metalist 1925 Kharkiv	8	(1)
2021	Bukovyna Chernivtsi	13	(4)
2021	Rubikon Kyiv	0	(0)
2021	Olimpik Donetsk	7	(0)
2022–2023	Rubikon Kyiv	7	(3)
2023	Shturm Ivankiv	0	(0)
2024–	Polissya Stavky	0	(0)
- * Club domestic league appearances and goals as of 6 October 2025

Anton Yuriyovych Kalaytan (Ukrainian: Антон Юрійович Калайтан; born 12 November 1998) is a Ukrainian professional footballer who plays as a right winger for Polissya Stavky.
