= Yuriy Malyey =

Ukrainian footballer (born 1992)

Personal information
- Full name: Yuriy Volodymyrovych Malyey
- Date of birth: 6 May 1992 (age 34)
- Place of birth: Chernihiv, Ukraine
- Height: 1.85 m (6 ft 1 in)
- Position: Striker

Team information
- Current team: Polissya Stavky
- Number: 27

Youth career
- 2006 - 2009: Yunist Chernihiv

Senior career*
| Years | Team | Apps | (Gls) |
| 2011 | YSB Chernihiv (amateurs) | 0 | (0) |
| 2011–2012 | Desna Chernihiv | 1 | (0) |
| 2012–2013 | YSB Chernihiv (amateurs) | 31 | (6) |
| 2014–2015 | Avangard Korukivka (amateurs) | 28 | (5) |
| 2015–2016 | Barsa Sumy | 10 | (4) |
| 2016–2017 | Hirnyk-Sport Horishni Plavni | 14 | (2) |
| 2016–2017 | Obolon-Brovar Kyiv | 1 | (0) |
| 2017–2018 | Polissya Zhytomyr | 20 | (2) |
| 2018–2019 | Myr Hornostayivka | 13 | (2) |
| 2018–2019 | Nyva Vinnytsia | 8 | (1) |
| 2019–2021 | Cherkashchyna | 35 | (5) |
| 2021 | Podillya Khmelnytskyi | 2 | (0) |
| 2021 | Kudrivka | 3 | (1) |
| 2021 | Dinaz Vyshhorod | 18 | (1) |
| 2022 | Veleten Hlukhiv | 0 | (0) |
| 2022–2024 | FC Denhoff Denykhivka | 0 | (0) |
| 2025– | Polissya Stavky | 0 | (0) |
- * Club domestic league appearances and goals as of 26 September 2025

Yuriy Volodymyrovych Malyey (Ukrainian: Юрій Володимирович Малєй; born 6 May 1992) is a Ukrainian football striker who currently plays for Polissya Stavky.

== Career ==
Yuriy, started his career with Yunist Chernihiv, the school of soccer in Chernihiv where few famous player such as Andriy Yarmolenko got graduated in soccer.

=== YSB Chernihiv ===
In 2011 he moved to YSB Chernihiv. Here he won the Chernihiv Oblast Football Cup in 2012.

=== Desna Chernihiv ===
He played also for Desna Chernihiv in Ukrainian Second League, where he got second in the season 2011–12.

=== Barsa Sumy, Hirnyk-SportHorishni Plavni, and Obolon-Brovar Kyiv ===
He played also for Barsa Sumy, Hirnyk-Sport Horishni Plavni, Obolon-Brovar Kyiv. In 2017 he moved to Polissya Zhytomyr, then in Myr Hornostayivka and in Nyva Vinnytsia.

=== Cherkashchyna ===
In 2019 he moved to Cherkashchyna.

=== Podillya Khmelnytskyi ===
In 2021 he moved to Podillya Khmelnytskyi. On 25 March 2021, he played his first match with the new club, against Karpaty Lviv in Ukrainian Second League ended 4-1. With the club won Ukrainian Second League of the season 2020–21.

=== Dinaz Vyshhorod ===
On 16 July 2021 signed for Dinaz Vyshhorod in Ukrainian Second League. On 31 July 2021 he made his debut with the new club against Dnipro Cherkasy, replacing Oleksandr Apanchuk in the 46th minute. On 18 August 2021 he played in Ukrainian Cup for the Second preliminary round, against Obolon Kyiv in the season 2021–22. On 18 September 2021 he scored his first goal with the new club against Nyva Vinnytsia in Ukrainian Second League in the season 2021–22 at the Dinaz Stadium in Lyutizh.

=== Polissya Stavky ===
In summer 2025 he moved to Polissya Stavky. On 8 August 2025 he scored in Ukrainian Cup against Lehiya Kyiv. On 25 August 2025 he scored again in Ukrainian Cup against Rebel Kyiv at the Temp stadium in Kyiv.

== Honours ==
=== Club ===
Kudrivka

- Chernihiv Oblast Football Cup: 2021
- Chernihiv Oblast Super Cupː 2021,
- Kyiv Oblast Football Cup: 2021

YSB Chernihiv

- Chernihiv Oblast Championship runner-up: 2011
- Chernihiv Oblast Cup runner-up: 2012

Podillya Khmelnytsky

- Ukrainian Second League runner-up: 2020–21
