= Andriy Poltavtsev =

Ukrainian footballer

Personal information
- Full name: Andriy Yuriyovych Poltavtsev
- Date of birth: 7 December 1991 (age 34)
- Height: 1.91 m (6 ft 3 in)
- Position: Goalkeeper

Team information
- Current team: Polissya Stavky

Youth career
- 2004–2008: Youth Sportive School Luhansk

Senior career*
Years	Team	Apps	(Gls)
2008–2017	Zorya Luhansk	2	(0)
2016	→ Guria Lanchkhuti (loan)	2	(0)
2017	→ Avanhard Kramatorsk (loan)	0	(0)
2017	Guria Lanchkhuti	12	(0)
2018	Kolkheti Poti	15	(0)
2019	Enerhiya Nova Kakhovka	10	(0)
2019–2020	Nikopol	13	(0)
2021–2023	Motor Zaporizhzhia	23	(0)
2023–	Polissya Stavky	0	(0)
- * Club domestic league appearances and goals as of 2 January 2025

Andriy Yuriyovych Poltavtsev (Ukrainian: Андрій Юрійович Полтавцев; born 7 December 1991) is a Ukrainian football goalkeeper who plays for Polissya Stavky.

== Career ==
Poltavtsev is a product of the Luhansk Youth Sportive School Systems.

He played during 7 years in FC Zorya reserve team and made his debut for FC Zorya in the match against FC Olimpik Donetsk on 28 February 2015 in the Ukrainian Premier League.
