= Roman Adamenko =

Ukrainian footballer

Personal information
- Full name: Roman Oleksandrovych Adamenko
- Date of birth: 20 July 1992 (age 34)
- Place of birth: Kyiv, Ukraine
- Height: 1.85 m (6 ft 1 in)
- Position: Centre-back

Youth career
- 2005–2007: Vidradnyi Kyiv
- 2007–2009: Dynamo Kyiv

Senior career*
Years	Team	Apps	(Gls)
2009–2013	Dynamo Kyiv	0	(0)
2010–2013	→ Dynamo-2 Kyiv	18	(0)
2013–2014	Hirnyk-Sport Komsomolsk	11	(0)
2014–2015	Mykolaiv	14	(1)
2015–2016	Arsenal Kyiv	7	(1)
2016–2017	Krystal Kherson	17	(1)
2017	Polissya Stavky	15	(2)
2018	Mezhyhirya Novi Petrivtsi	9	(0)
2018	Kobra Kharkiv	2	(0)
2018	Myr Hornostaivka	0	(0)
2019	Nyva Vinnytsia	10	(1)
2019–2020	Polissya Zhytomyr	13	(1)
2021	Partyzan Kodra	0	(0)
2021–2022	Alians Lypova Dolyna	2	(0)
- * Club domestic league appearances and goals as of 13 January 2022

Roman Oleksandrovych Adamenko (Ukrainian: Роман Олександрович Адаменко; born 20 July 1992) is a professional Ukrainian footballer who plays as a centre-back.
