= Serhiy Siminin =

Ukrainian footballer

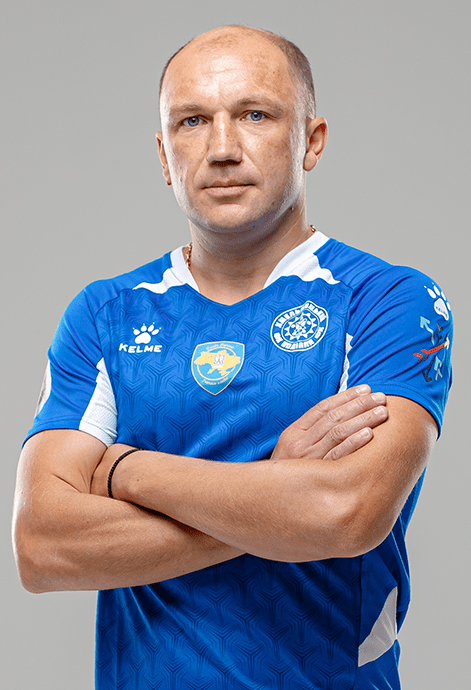

Personal information
- Full name: Serhiy Fedorovych Siminin
- Date of birth: 9 October 1987 (age 39)
- Place of birth: Prymorskyi, Crimean Oblast, Ukrainian SSR
- Height: 1.79 m (5 ft 10 in)
- Position: Defender

Team information
- Current team: Podillya Khmelnytskyi
- Number: 3

Youth career
- 2002–2004: LVUFK Luhansk

Senior career*
Years	Team	Apps	(Gls)
2006–2008	Zorya Luhansk	1	(0)
2007–2008	→ Volyn Lutsk (loan)	35	(0)
2009	Helios Kharkiv	9	(0)
2009–2015	Volyn Lutsk	134	(1)
2015–2016	Vorskla Poltava	46	(0)
2017	Oleksandriya	9	(0)
2017–2018	Veres Rivne	29	(2)
2018	Lviv	0	(0)
2018–2021	Volyn Lutsk	81	(1)
2021–2022	Karpaty Lviv	16	(0)
2022–2023	Lviv	10	(0)
2023–2025	Podillya Khmelnytskyi	34	(0)
2025	Trostianets	0	(0)
2025	Polissya Stavky	0	(0)

Managerial career
- 2025–2026: Kudrivka (youth)
- * Club domestic league appearances and goals as of 19 November 2026

Serhiy Fedorovych Siminin (Ukrainian: Сергій Федорович Сімінін; born 9 October 1987) is a Ukrainian professional footballer who plays as a defender for Polissya Stavky.

== Career ==
Siminin is the product of Zorya Luhansk Youth School system where he was first trained by Serhiy Mayorov. In November 2022 his contract with Karpaty Lviv was ended.

== Managerial career ==
In 2025 together with Vitaliy Kostyshyn, he was appojnted as coach of Kudrivka (youth teams), but in February 2026, he was released and replaced by Oleksandr Protchenko.
