= Dmytro Shynkarenko =

Ukrainian footballer

Personal information
- Full name: Dmytro Oleksandrovych Shynkarenko
- Date of birth: 26 January 2000 (age 26)
- Place of birth: Mariupol, Donetsk Oblast, Ukraine
- Height: 1.81 m (5 ft 11 1/2 in)
- Position: Defender

Team information
- Current team: Bukovyna Chernivtsi
- Number: 14

Youth career
- 2013–2014: Mariupol
- 2014–2015: DVUFK Dnipropetrovsk
- 2015–2019: Mariupol

Senior career*
Years	Team	Apps	(Gls)
2019–2021	Mariupol	0	(0)
2020–2021	→ Avanhard Kramatorsk (loan)	27	(1)
2021–2023	Hirnyk-Sport Horishni Plavni	28	(1)
2023–2024	Prykarpattia Ivano-Frankivsk	34	(6)
2024–	Bukovyna Chernivtsi	40	(1)
- * Club domestic league appearances and goals as of 3 June 2026

Dmytro Oleksandrovych Shynkarenko (Ukrainian: Дмитро Олександрович Шинкаренко; born 26 January 2000) is a Ukrainian professional footballer who plays as a defender for Bukovyna Chernivtsi.

== Career ==
Shynkarenko was born in Donetsk Oblast, Ukraine, and began to play football with the local FC Mariupol youth academy playing in the Ukrainian Premier League Reserves and Under 19 Championship.

In August 2020 he signed a one-year loan deal with Ukrainian First League side Avanhard Kramatorsk.

In January 2023 he moved to Prykarpattia Ivano-Frankivsk.
