= Volodymyr Zubashivskyi =

Ukrainian footballer (born 1999)

Personal information
- Full name: Volodymyr Zubashivskyi
- Date of birth: 28 February 1999 (age 27)
- Place of birth: Chernihiv, Ukraine
- Height: 1.74 m (5 ft 9 in)
- Position: Midfielder

Youth career
- 2016–2018: RVUFK Kyiv
- 2018–2019: Olimpik Donetsk

Senior career*
Years	Team	Apps	(Gls)
2018–2019	Olympia Radotín	10	(0)
2020	Dukla Prague	0	(0)
2020–2022	Kudrivka	11	(5)
2022–2023	Chernihiv	8	(0)
2023–2024	Kudrivka	3	(0)
- * Club domestic league appearances and goals as of 26 December 2024

Volodymyr Zubashivskyi (Ukrainian: Володимир Зубашівський; born 28 February 1999) is a Ukrainian professional footballer who plays as a midfielder.

== Career ==
=== Early career ===
He started his career at RVUFK Kyiv and in the youth system of Olimpik Donetsk. In 2018 he moved to Dukla Prague.

=== FC Chernihiv ===
On 23 August 2022 he signed for FC Chernihiv of the Ukrainian First League. On 27 August he made his league debut against Skoruk Tomakivka at the Yunist Stadium in Chernihiv.

== Career statistics ==
=== Club ===
As of match played 26 December 2024

Appearances and goals by club, season and competition
Club	Season	League			Cup		Europe		Other		Total	
Club	Season	Division	Apps	Goals	Apps	Goals	Apps	Goals	Apps	Goals	Apps	Goals
Olympia Radotín	2018–2019	Prague Championship	10	0	0	0	0	0	0	0	10	0
Sokol Brozany	2018–2019	Prague Championship	6	0	3	0	0	0	0	0	9	0
Dukla Prague	2019–2020	2. liga	0	0	0	0	0	0	0	0	9	0
FC Chernihiv	2022–23	Ukrainian First League	8	0	0	0	0	0	0	0	8	0
Kudrivka	2023–24	Ukrainian Second League	3	0	0	0	0	0	0	0	3	0
Career total			27	0	3	0	0	0	0	0	30	0

== Honours ==
Kudrivka

- Kyiv Oblast Football Cup: 2021
- Chernihiv Oblast Football Cup: 2021, 2022
