= Myroslav Serdyuk =

Ukrainian footballer (born 1999)

Personal information
- Full name: Myroslav Oleksandrovych Serdyuk
- Date of birth: 27 July 1999 (age 27)
- Place of birth: Chernihiv, Ukraine
- Height: 1.74 m (5 ft 9 in)
- Position: Midfielder

Team information
- Current team: Kudrivka
- Number: 17

Youth career
- 2016–2017: Yunist Chernihiv
- 2017–2018: SDYuShOR Desna
- 2018–2022: Desna-2 Chernihiv

Senior career*
Years	Team	Apps	(Gls)
2022–2023	Chernihiv	21	(2)
2023	Kudrivka	15	(1)
2024	Nyva Buzova	6	(0)
2024–	Kudrivka	47	(0)
- * Club domestic league appearances and goals as of 7 novembre 2026

Myroslav Oleksandrovych Serdyuk (Ukrainian: Мирослав Олександрович Сердюк; born 27 July 1999) is a Ukrainian professional footballer who plays as a midfielder for Kudrivka in the Ukrainian Premier League.

== Early career ==
In 2018 he played for Desna-2 Chernihiv, the reserve squad of Desna Chernihiv, making 44 appearances and scoring four goals.

== Career ==
=== FC Chernihiv ===
On 23 August 2022, Serdyuk signed for FC Chernihiv in the Ukrainian First League. On 27 August he made his Ukrainian First League debut against Skoruk Tomakivka. On 24 November, he scored his first league goal against Hirnyk-Sport Horishni Plavni. On 23 April 2023 he scored against FSC Mariupol in the 96th minute (sixth half of injury time), scoring the winning goal. In summer 2023 his contract was ended by mutual consent of the parties.

=== Kudrivka ===
Some days later, he moved to Kudrivka in Ukrainian Second League. On 29 July 2023 he made his debut in 2023–24 Ukrainian Cup against Olympia Savyntsi at the Tsentralnyi Stadion in Mykolaiv.

=== Nyva Buzova ===
In 2024, he joined Nyva Buzova, where he made his debut with the new club in the away match against Inhulets Petrove at the Inhulets Stadium in Petrove.

=== Kudrivka ===
Following the merger between Nyva Buzova and Kudrivka, he moved to Kudrivka just admitted in Ukrainian First League. Myroslav earned 18 caps in the league and 3 in Ukrainian Cup. On 1 June 2025, he heped the club to secure promotion to Ukrainian Premier League after win against FC Vorskla Poltava on aggregate 1–1 and win penalty 3–4. On 17 August 2024 he made his debut in Ukrainian Premier League against Obolon Kyiv at the Obolon Arena.

== Career statistics ==
As of match played 7 novembre 2026

Appearances and goals by club, season and competition
Club	Season	League			Cup		Europe		Other		Total	
Club	Season	Division	Apps	Goals	Apps	Goals	Apps	Goals	Apps	Goals	Apps	Goals
Chernihiv	2022–23	Ukrainian First League	21	2	0	0	0	0	0	0	21	2
Kudrivka	2023–24	Ukrainian Second League	15	1	3	0	0	0	0	0	18	1
Niva Buzova	2023–24	Ukrainian First League	6	0	0	0	0	0	0	0	6	0
Kudrivka	2024–25	Ukrainian First League	18	0	3	0	0	0	2	0	23	0
Kudrivka	2025–26	Ukrainian Premier League	21	0	0	0	0	0	0	0	21	0
Kudrivka	2026–27	Ukrainian Premier League	8	0	2	0	0	0	0	0	10	0
Career total			85	3	8	0	0	0	2	0	95	3

== Honours ==
Kudrivka

- Chernihiv Oblast Football Cup 2021
- Kyiv Oblast Football Federation: 2020
- Kyiv Oblast Football Cup: 2021
