= Mykyta Polyulyakh =

Ukrainian footballer

Personal information
- Full name: Mykyta Anatoliyovych Polyulyakh
- Date of birth: 15 March 1993 (age 33)
- Place of birth: Dniprodzerzhynsk, Ukraine
- Height: 1.87 m (6 ft 2 in)
- Position: Midfielder

Team information
- Current team: Avanhard Lozova

Youth career
- 2006: Enerhoyunior Dniprodzerzhynsk
- 2006–2007: Vidradnyi Kyiv
- 2007: Dynamo Kyiv
- 2008–2009: Dnipro Dnipropetrovsk

Senior career*
Years	Team	Apps	(Gls)
2009–2011	Dnipro Dnipropetrovsk	0	(0)
2011–2014	Metalurh Donetsk	3	(0)
2014	→ Stal Alchevsk (loan)	10	(0)
2015–2016	Kolkheti-1913 Poti	23	(0)
2016–2020	Avanhard Kramatorsk	109	(2)
2020–2022	Veres Rivne	43	(0)
2022–2023	LNZ Cherkasy	15	(1)
2023–2025	Epitsentr Kamianets-Podilskyi	29	(0)
2025–	Avanhard Lozova	29	(0)

International career^{‡}
2008–2009	Ukraine U16	18	(4)
2010	Ukraine U17	7	(0)
2010–2011	Ukraine U18	6	(0)
2011–2012	Ukraine U19	9	(1)
- * Club domestic league appearances and goals as of 3 August 2025 ‡ National team caps and goals as of 8 August 2016

Mykyta Anatoliyovych Polyulyakh (Ukrainian: Микита Анатолійович Полюлях; born 15 March 1993) is a Ukrainian professional footballer who plays as a midfielder for Avanhard Lozova.

== Career ==
He played for Metalurh Donetsk in the Ukrainian Premier League.

Polyulyakh is product of Enerhoyunior Dniprodzerdzhynsk academy. He debuted for Metalurh Donetsk as a second-half substitute against Volyn Lutsk on 21 May 2011 in Ukrainian Premier League.
