= Vladyslav Horbachenko =

Ukrainian footballer

Personal information
- Full name: Vladyslav Olehovych Horbachenko
- Date of birth: 11 March 1997 (age 29)
- Place of birth: Druzhnya, Kyiv Oblast, Ukraine
- Height: 1.86 m (6 ft 1 in)
- Position: Centre-forward

Team information
- Current team: Polissya Stavky
- Number: 24

Youth career
- 2012–2015: Arsenal Kyiv

Senior career*
| Years | Team | Apps | (Gls) |
| 2017 | Bila Tserkva | 11 | (1) |
| 2017–2018 | Vorskla Poltava | 0 | (0) |
| 2019 | Rubikon Kyiv | 8 | (1) |
| 2019–2020 | Kalush | 20 | (2) |
| 2020–2021 | VPK-Ahro Shevchenkivka | 15 | (4) |
| 2021–2022 | Prykarpattia | 14 | (0) |
| 2022–2023 | Horishni Plavni | 21 | (2) |
| 2025– | Polissya Stavky | 0 | (0) |
- * Club domestic league appearances and goals as of 26 September 2025

Vladyslav Olehovych Horbachenko (Ukrainian: Владислав Олегович Горбаченко; born 11 March 1997) is a Ukrainian professional footballer who plays as a centre-forward for Ukrainian club Polissya Stavky .
