= Mykyta Makhynya =

Ukrainian footballer

Personal information
- Full name: Mykyta Leonidovych Makhynya
- Date of birth: 16 January 2003 (age 23)
- Place of birth: Melitopol, Ukraine
- Height: 1.81 m (5 ft 11 in)
- Position: Centre-forward

Youth career
- 2016–2019: DVUFK Dnipro
- 2019–2020: Shakhtar Donetsk

Senior career*
Years	Team	Apps	(Gls)
2019–2021	Shakhtar Donetsk	0	(0)
2021–2022	Mariupol	1	(0)
2022–2023	Mariupol	22	(0)
2022–2023	Kudrivka	8	(0)
2024–2026	Bucha	0	(0)
2026	Druzhba-Kozaky	0	(0)
2026–	Bucha	0	(0)
- * Club domestic league appearances and goals as of 6 September 2026

Mykyta Leonidovych Makhynya (Ukrainian: Микита Леонідович Махиня; born 16 January 2003) is a Ukrainian professional footballer who plays as a centre-forward.
