= Maksym Leshchenko =

Ukrainian footballer

Personal information
- Full name: Maksym Serhiovych Leshchenko
- Date of birth: 29 April 1993 (age 33)
- Place of birth: Chernihiv, Ukraine
- Height: 1.74 m (5 ft 9 in)
- Position: Defender

Youth career
- 2009: Dynamo Kyiv

Senior career*
| Years | Team | Apps | (Gls) |
| 2009–2011 | Dynamo-2 Kyiv | 6 | (0) |
| 2011–2014 | Kryvbas-2 Kryvyi Rih | 62 | (2) |
| 2011–2014 | Obolon Kyiv | 30 | (0) |
| 2014–2016 | Mykolaiv | 19 | (1) |
| 2015–2017 | Desna Chernihiv | 6 | (0) |
| 2016–2017 | Poltava | 11 | (0) |
| 2016–2018 | Krymteplytsia Molodizhne | 24 | (1) |
| 2018–2019 | Kobra Kharkiv | 2 | (0) |
| 2018–2019 | Polissya Zhytomyr | 8 | (0) |
| 2019–2023 | SC Chaika | 34 | (1) |
| 2023–2024 | Kudrivka | 15 | (1) |
| 2026– | Kalynivka | 0 | (0) |
- * Club domestic league appearances and goals as of 19 August 2026

Maksym Serhiovych Leshchenko (Ukrainian: Максим Сергійович Лещенко; born 29 April 1993) is a Ukrainian professional footballer who plays as a defender.

== Career ==
Leshchenko began his career at Dynamo-2 Kyiv in 2009 where he played two seasons, before moving to Kryvbas-2 Kryvyi Rih. Then he moved to Obolon Kyiv for two seasons where he played 30 games. Obolon Kyiv. In 2014 he moved to Mykolaiv in Ukrainian First League for two seasons playing 19 matches and scoring 1 goal against Nyva Ternopil at the Tsentralnyi Stadion in Mykolaiv.

In December 2015 he moved to Desna Chernihiv in the city of Chernihiv, playing only 6 games, before moving to Poltava playimg 11 games. In December 2016 he moved to Krymteplytsia Molodizhne in Crimea where he played 26 games scoring 1 goal. In 2018 he played two games with Kobra Kharkiv and 8 with Polissya Zhytomyr.

In 2019 he moved to SC Chaika team playing in the Ukrainian Second League. On 1 November 2020, he scored against Volyn-2 Lutsk at the Stadium Pidshypnyk in Lutsk.

In 2023 his contract with the club was terminated and he moved to Kudrivka in Ukrainian Second League. On 11 August 2023 he scored his first goal with the club against Vast Mykolaiv at the Kudrivka Arena.

== Honours ==
Desna Chernihiv

- Ukrainian First League: Runners-up 2016–17
