= Dmytro Zhykol =

Ukrainian footballer (born 1995)

Personal information
- Full name: Dmytro Oleksandrovych Zhykol
- Date of birth: 26 January 1995 (age 31)
- Place of birth: Kyiv, Ukraine
- Height: 1.79 m (5 ft 10 in)
- Position: Central midfielder

Youth career
- 2005–2010: Dynamo Kyiv
- 2010: Darnytsya-KSDYuShOR Kyiv
- 2010: Zirka Kyiv
- 2010–2012: Knyazha Shchaslyve

Senior career*
Years	Team	Apps	(Gls)
2012–2014	Arsenal Kyiv	0	(0)
2014	Sevastopol	0	(0)
2014–2016	Dynamo Kyiv	0	(0)
2015–2016	→ Dynamo-2 Kyiv	18	(1)
2017–2018	Fastav Zlín B	0	(0)
2018–2019	Prostějov	33	(3)
2019–2020	SC Chaika	13	(2)
2021–2022	Podillya Khmelnytskyi	5	(0)
2022–2022	SC Chaika	8	(0)
2023–2024	Kudrivka	9	(2)
- * Club domestic league appearances and goals as of 1 May 2025

Dmytro Oleksandrovych Zhykol (Ukrainian: Дмитро Олександрович Жикол; born 26 January 1995) is a Ukrainian professional footballer who plays as a central midfielder.
