= Demydiv, Kyiv Oblast =

Rural locality in Kyiv Oblast, Ukraine

Demydiv Демидів
- Village
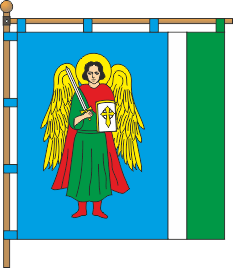
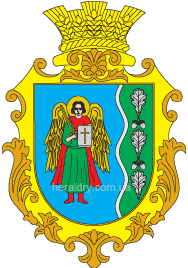
- Flag Coat of arms

- Location within Ukraine Location within Kyiv Oblast
- Coordinates: 50°43′38″N 30°19′38″E
- Country: Ukraine
- Oblast: Kyiv Oblast
- Raion: Vyshhorod Raion
- First mentioned: 1026 (as Horodok)
- Destroyed: 1240-1241
- First mentioned: 1543 (as Demydiv)

Area
  - Total: 16.89 km^{2} (6.52 sq mi)

Population (2006)
  - Total: 3,702
- Postal code: 07335

Demydiv (Ukrainian: Демидів; Russian: Демидов) is a village in Vyshhorod Raion, Kyiv Oblast, Ukraine. It belongs to Dymer settlement hromada, one of the hromadas of Ukraine.

== Geography ==
Demydiv lies on the western bank of the Irpin River, north of Kyiv. It is located on the Kyiv–Minsk highway.

== History ==
In the vicinity of Demydiv, around 200 Old Ruthenian burial mounds (kurgans) were found along the Irpin River. At the same time, in the area known as Horodok, the earthworks of a Slavic historic settlement exist: the remnants of the Old Ruthenian city of Horodok. In the Russian (Ruthenian) Chronicles, the settlement is first mentioned in 1026, when the Great Prince Yaroslav the Wise signed a peace treaty with his brother Mstyslav, dividing Old Ruthenian lands along the Dnieper.

Until the building of the Irpin's Kozarovychi Dam in 1960, the landscape of Demydiv was largely swamp and marshland.

During the Russian invasion of Ukraine, it was flooded by breaking the dam on 25 February 2022 to hinder Russian advances towards Kyiv.

== Culture and entertainment ==
The settlement has a small football training center, which is home to the Ukrainian professional football club FC Dinaz Vyshhorod. The football grounds are used in lower-league football competitions. It has a smaller seating capacity than another one located in Lyutizh.

In 2015, a private zoo was established, the "XII Misiatsiv" (12 months).

=== Burials ===
Varvara Dovzhenko, the wife of the Soviet film producer Oleksandr Dovzhenko, is buried in the village.

== Gallery ==
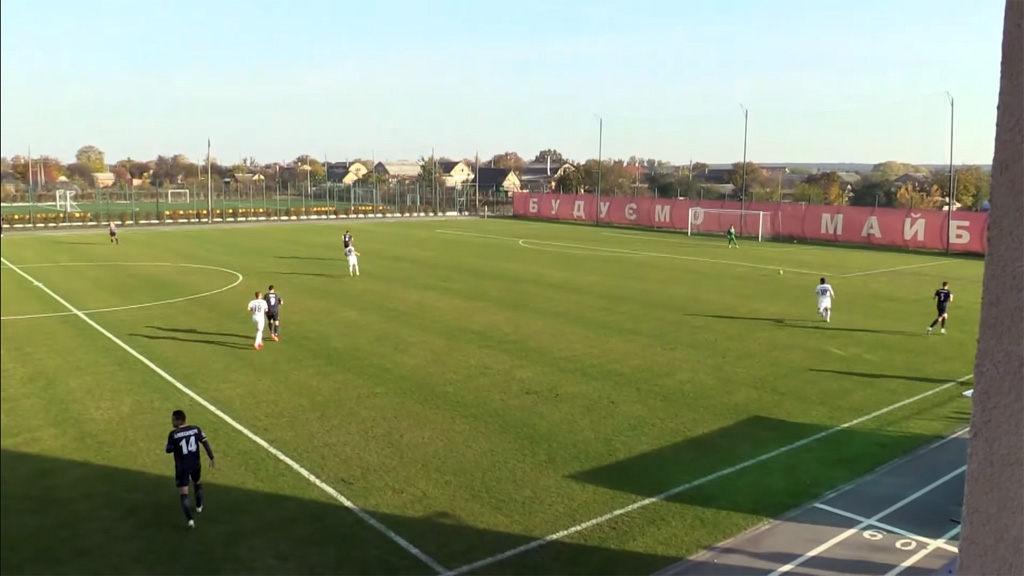
Dinaz Stadium in Demydiv

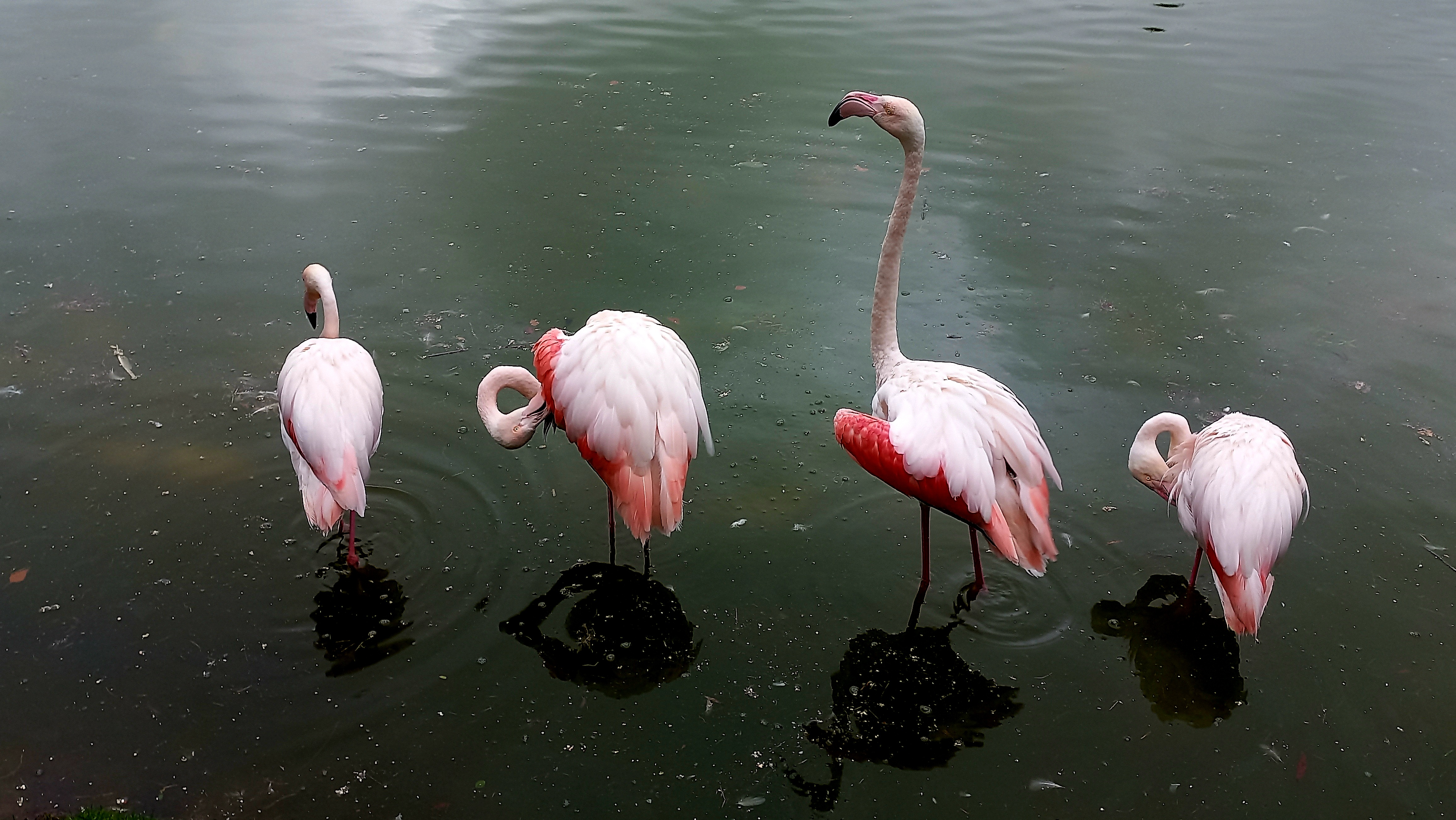
Flamingos in a private zoo on the outskirts of the village

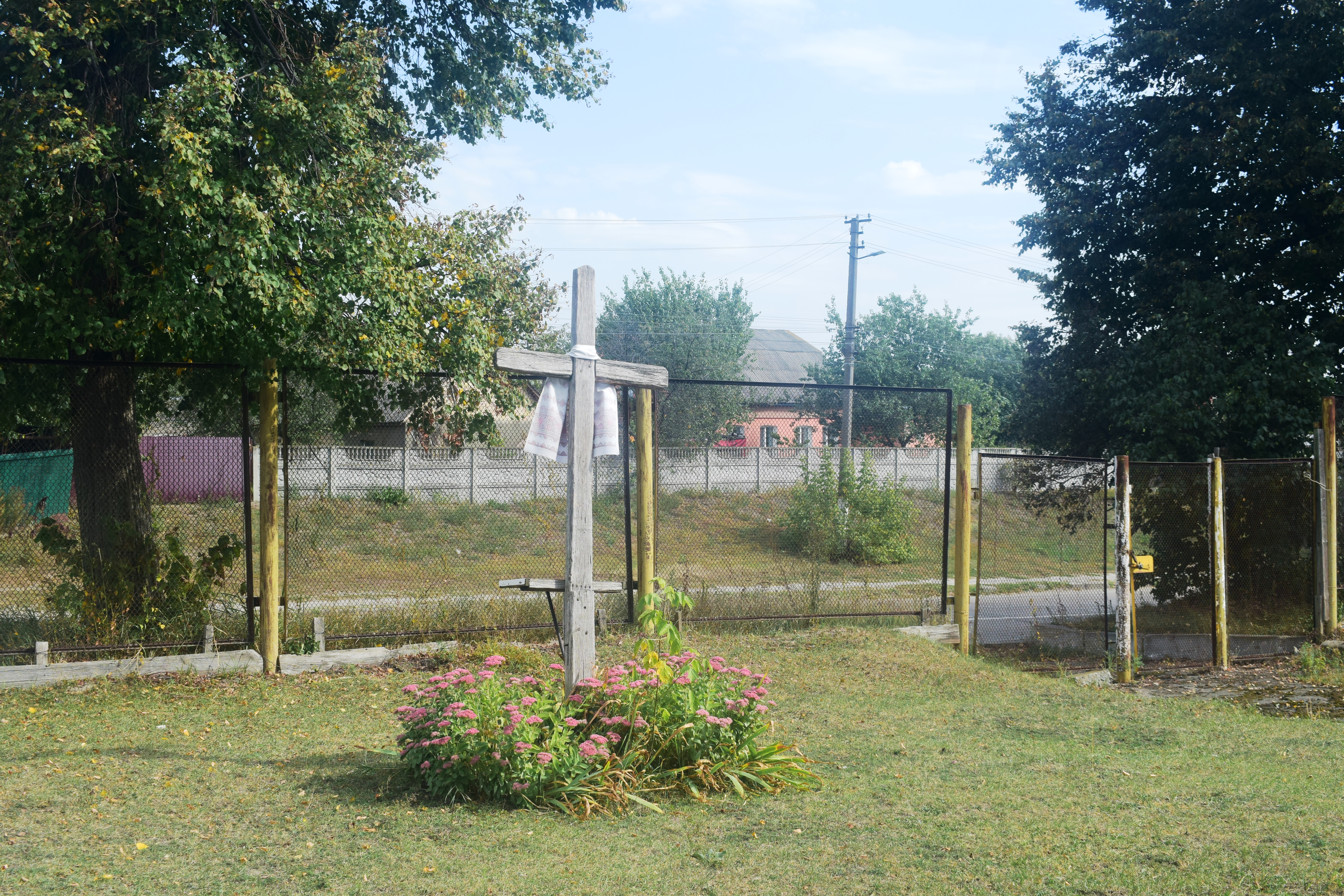
Memorial cross to the victims of Holodomor

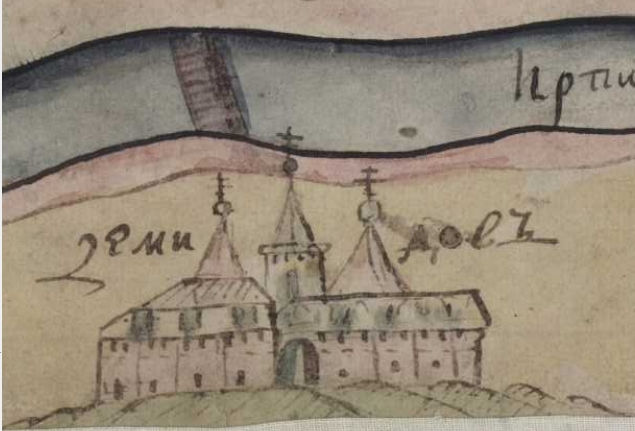
Fragment from the 18th-century Russian map showing Demydiv as "Demidov"
