= Denys Halata =

Ukrainian footballer (born 2000)

Personal information
- Full name: Denys Olehovych Halata
- Date of birth: 4 September 2000 (age 26)
- Place of birth: Kremenchuk, Poltava Oblast, Ukraine
- Height: 1.76 m (5 ft 9 1/2 in)
- Position: Forward

Team information
- Current team: Grobiņas
- Number: 21

Youth career
- 201?–2017: Kremin Kremenchuk
- 2017–2019: Vorskla Poltava

Senior career*
Years	Team	Apps	(Gls)
2019–2022	Vorskla Poltava	4	(0)
2020–2022	→ Kremin Kremenchuk (loan)	42	(8)
2022–	Kremin Kremenchuk	17	(11)
2023	→ Metalurh Zaporizhzhia (loan)	18	(2)
2024	→ Grobiņas (loan)	33	(4)
2025–	Grobiņas	5	(1)
- * Club domestic league appearances and goals as of 1 May 2025

Denys Halata (Ukrainian: Денис Олегович Галата; born 4 September 2000) is a Ukrainian football forward who plays for Latvian club Grobiņas.

== Career ==
Halata is a product of Kremin Kremenchuk youth sportive system. He continued his youth career in the Vorskla Poltava.

On 27 July 2019 during the match against Zorya U-21 in Ukrainian Premier League Under-21, Halata scored the first goal of the season.

In 2019 he was promoted to the main squad to play in the Ukrainian Premier League for Vorskla. Halata made his debut in the Ukrainian Premier League for FC Vorskla as a substituted on 15 December 2019, playing in a winning match against FC Karpaty Lviv.

=== Metalurh Zaporizhzhia ===
Halata moved to on loan to Metalurh Zaporizhzhia on 10 July 2023. During first half of the season he played in eighteen matches and scored twice.

=== Grobiņas ===
In March 2024 it was revealed that Halata moved to Latvian Higher League club Grobiņas. He made his debut on 10 March 2024 in a 1:0 loss to Riga. He replaced Pape Diufs Ndiaje Dudu on fifty-ninth minute.
