= Roman Borysevych =

Ukrainian footballer

Personal information
- Full name: Roman Volodymyrovych Borysevych
- Date of birth: 20 June 1993 (age 33)
- Place of birth: Horodenka, Ukraine
- Height: 1.78 m (5 ft 10 in)
- Position: Defensive midfielder

Team information
- Current team: Probiy Horodenka
- Number: 31

Youth career
- 2006–2010: Prykarpattia Ivano-Frankivsk
- 2010: Probiy Horodenka

Senior career*
Years	Team	Apps	(Gls)
2010–2011	Prykarpattia-2 Ivano-Frankivsk	11	(1)
2012	Karpaty Yaremche	5	(0)
2012	Sokil Uhryniv	12	(0)
2013	Prykarpattia Ivano-Frankivsk	22	(3)
2014	Prydnistrovya Tlumach	11	(0)
2017–2018	Pokuttia Kolomyia	12	(2)
2018–2023	Prykarpattia Ivano-Frankivsk	88	(1)
2023–	Probiy Horodenka	75	(1)
- * Club domestic league appearances and goals as of 4 June 2026

Roman Volodymyrovych Borysevych (Ukrainian: Роман Володимирович Борисевич; born 20 June 1993) is a Ukrainian professional footballer who plays as a defensive midfielder for Ukrainian club Probiy Horodenka.
