= Kudrivka Arena =

Football Arena

- Interactive map of Kudrivka Arena
- Location: Zholdaka St., 111 A, Kudrivka village, Chernihiv Oblast, Ukraine, 16122
- Owner: FC Kudrivka
- Operator: FC Kudrivka
- Capacity: 500
- Surface: Artificial grass
- Field size: 105x68

Construction
- Opened: 2018
- Expanded: 2021

Tenants
- FC Kudrivka; Druzhba-Kozaky Nizhyn since 2026

Kudrivka Arena (Ukrainian: Кудрівка Арена) is a football stadium in Kudrivka, Ukraine. The stadium is a home arena for FC Kudrivka.

== Description ==
Kudrivka Arena has a natural grass field with an automated irrigation system, showers and changing rooms for athletes, toilets, etc. Next to the stadium is a pond with a fountain, gazebos, a recreation area and a volleyball court. The stands are equipped with individual seats. Initially, the arena could accommodate 300 spectators. Later, in order for the stadium to meet the requirements of the Ukrainian Second League, the capacity of its stands was increased, and now it is 500 people.

== History ==
=== Origin ===
The stadium was built on the site of a village field in 2018. Initially, it hosted matches of the local football club, FC Kudrivka, in district and regional competitions and in the Ukrainian Amateur Football Championship

In October 2023, the stadium hosted a charity football match in support of the Armed Forces of Ukraine between the veterans of FC Kudrivka and veteran members of the Ukrainian national team.

On 21 September 2024, Kudrivka Arena hosted a Ukrainian First League match for the first time, with FC Kudrivka drawing 1–1 with Metalist 1925 Kharkiv.

=== New Tenants ===
In 2026, FC Druzhba-Kozaky Nizhyn played its home matches in the Ukrainian Cup at the Kudrivka Arena.

== Using ==
- The stadium hosts some home matches of FC Kudrivka for the Ukrainian First League.

== Important matches ==
=== Ukrainian Cup (Qualification round) ===
Date	Team #1	Result	Team #2	Round	Attendance	Source
9 August 2026	(Ukraine) Druzhba-Kozaky Nizhyn	2–2 (4-3)	(Ukraine) VIVAD Romaniv	2026–27 Ukrainian Cup	-	
21 August 2026	(Ukraine) Druzhba-Kozaky Nizhyn	3–5	(Ukraine) Bazys Kochubiyivka	2026–27 Ukrainian Cup	-	

Date	Team #1	Result	Team #2	Round	Attendance	Source
12 August 2024	(Ukraine) Kudrivka	2–2 (6-7)	(Ukraine) Mariupol	2023–24 Ukrainian Cup	-	
