= Dmytro Penteleychuk =

Ukrainian footballer

Personal information
- Full name: Dmytro Viktorovych Penteleychuk
- Date of birth: 9 August 2000 (age 26)
- Place of birth: Chernivtsi, Ukraine
- Height: 1.80 m (5 ft 11 in)
- Position: Left midfielder

Team information
- Current team: Tomasovia Tomaszów Lubelski

Youth career
- 2013–2015: Bukovyna Chernivtsi
- 2015–2017: UFK Lviv

Senior career*
Years	Team	Apps	(Gls)
2017–2018	Veres Rivne	0	(0)
2018–2022	Lviv	2	(0)
2021–2022	→ Vovchansk (loan)	18	(2)
2022–2024	Mariupol	50	(7)
2025	Kulykiv-Bilka	3	(0)
2026–	Tomasovia Tomaszów Lubelski	0	(0)
- * Club domestic league appearances and goals as of 09:54, 20 July 2026 (UTC)

Dmytro Viktorovych Penteleychuk (Ukrainian: Дмитро Вікторович Пентелейчук; born 9 August 2000) is a Ukrainian professional footballer who plays as a left midfielder for IV liga Lublin club Tomasovia Tomaszów Lubelski.

== Career ==
Penteleychuk is a product of the Bukovyna and UFK Lviv youth sportive schools.

He played for Veres and Lviv in the Ukrainian Premier League Reserves and in January 2019 Penteleychuk was promoted to the senior squad of the last team. He made his debut in the Ukrainian Premier League for Lviv on 22 May 2019, playing in a draw match against FC Zorya Luhansk.
