= Oleksandr Batalskyi =

Ukrainian footballer

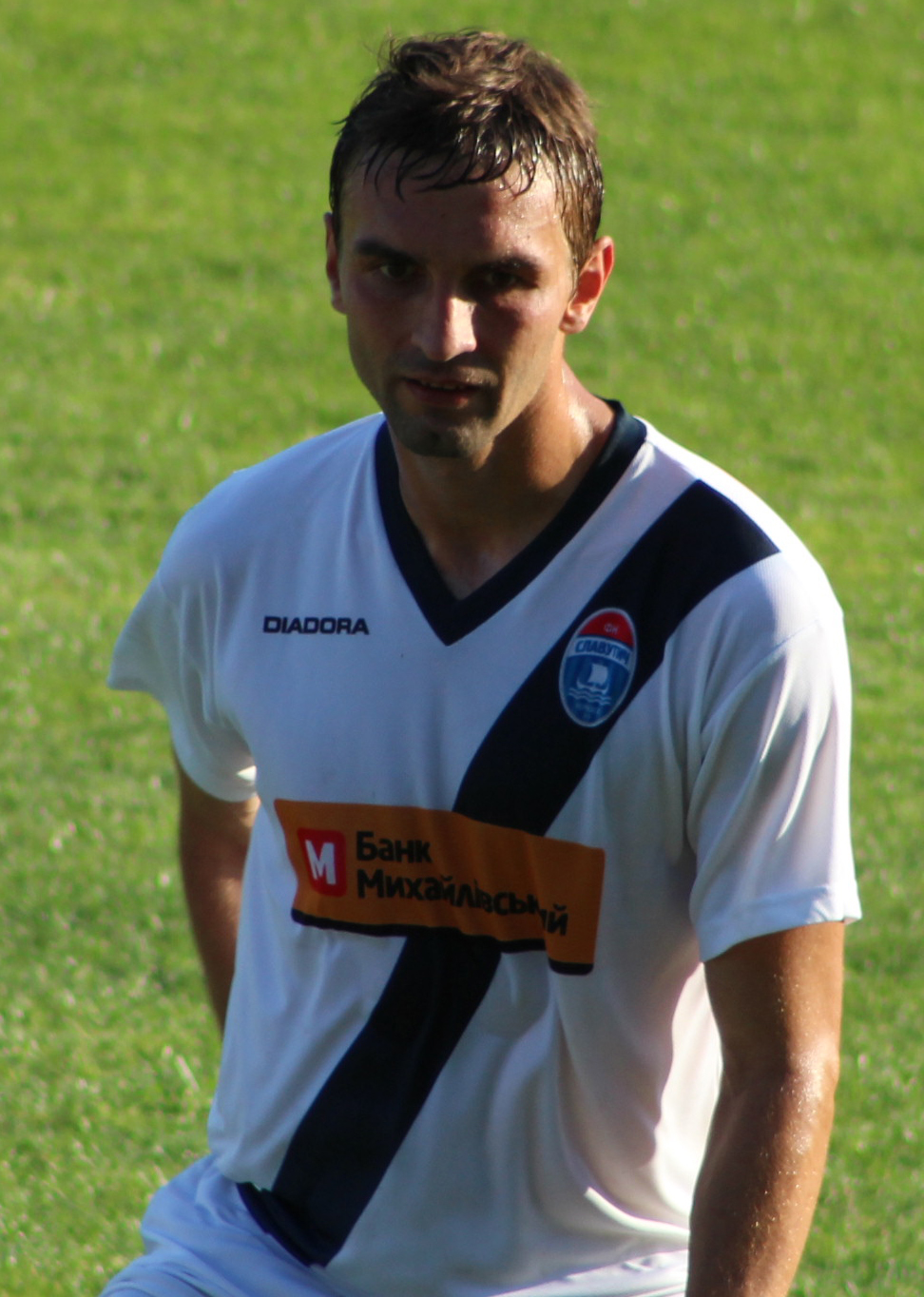

Personal information
- Full name: Oleksandr Anatoliyovych Batalskyi
- Date of birth: 28 October 1986 (age 40)
- Place of birth: Kyiv, Soviet Union (now Ukraine)
- Height: 1.90 m (6 ft 3 in)
- Position: Striker

Team information
- Current team: FSC Mariupol
- Number: 9

Youth career
- 2001–2003: Lokomotyv Kyiv

Senior career*
Years	Team	Apps	(Gls)
2003–2008	Arsenal Kyiv	39	(1)
2003–2004	→ Arsenal-2 Kyiv	3	(0)
2008–2009	Dnister Ovidiopol	25	(4)
2010	Prykarpattia Ivano-Frankivsk	5	(0)
2010–2012	Zirka Kirovohrad	41	(10)
2012–2013	Helios Kharkiv	12	(1)
2014–2016	Cherkaskyi Dnipro	69	(27)
2017–2018	Arsenal Kyiv	45	(18)
2018	Rukh Vynnyky	16	(1)
2019	Shevardeni-1906 Tbilisi	12	(2)
2019–2023	Obolon Kyiv	78	(29)
2023–	FSC Mariupol	26	(4)

International career
2006–2007	Ukraine U21	2	(0)
- * Club domestic league appearances and goals as of 19 June 2024

Oleksandr Batalskyi (Ukrainian: Олександр Анатолійович Батальський; born 28 October 1986) is a Ukrainian professional footballer who plays as a striker for FSC Mariupol.

Batalskyi is a product of the Lokomotyv Kyiv academy system. He spent the rest of his career at different clubs in the Ukrainian First League and Ukrainian Second League.

Batalskyi jointed top ten All-time Ukrainian First League scorers in September 2022 with sixty-eight goals. In 2023-24 season while playing for FSC Mariupol he moved up to eight spot having now scored seventy-five goals.
