= Dinaz Stadium =

Stadium in Demydiv, Ukraine

Dinaz
- Діназ
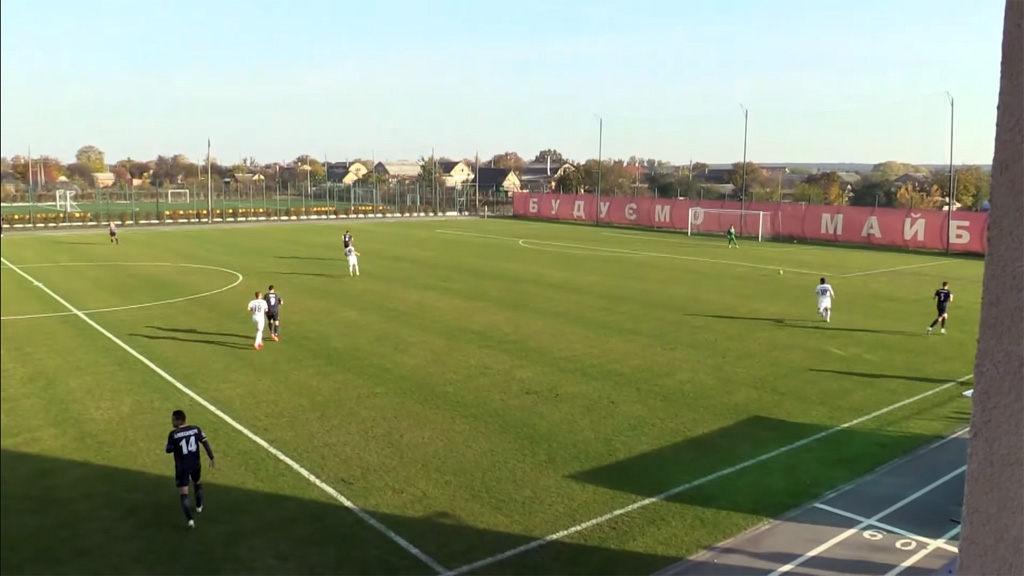
- Interactive map of Dinaz
- Location: Demydiv, Ukraine
- Coordinates: 50°43′32.3″N 30°19′55.9″E
- Capacity: 550
- Surface: Grass
- Field size: 105 m × 68 m (344 ft × 223 ft)

Construction
- Opened: 2012; 14 years ago

Tenants
- FC Dinaz Vyshhorod (2012–present); FSC Mariupol (2022–present); FC Vast Mykolaiv (2022–present)

Dinaz Stadium (Ukrainian: Діназ) is a football stadium in Demydiv, Ukraine. It is the home stadium of FC Dinaz Vyshhorod and also a training field.

Stadium was opened in 2012 and holds 500 spectators. It is a category One stadium. During the 2022–23 Ukrainian First League it was also a home ground for relocated team FSC Mariupol. Also, FC Vast Mykolaiv used the stadium as home ground during their 2022-23 Second League campaign.
