= Andriy Smalko =

Soviet footballer and Ukrainian coach

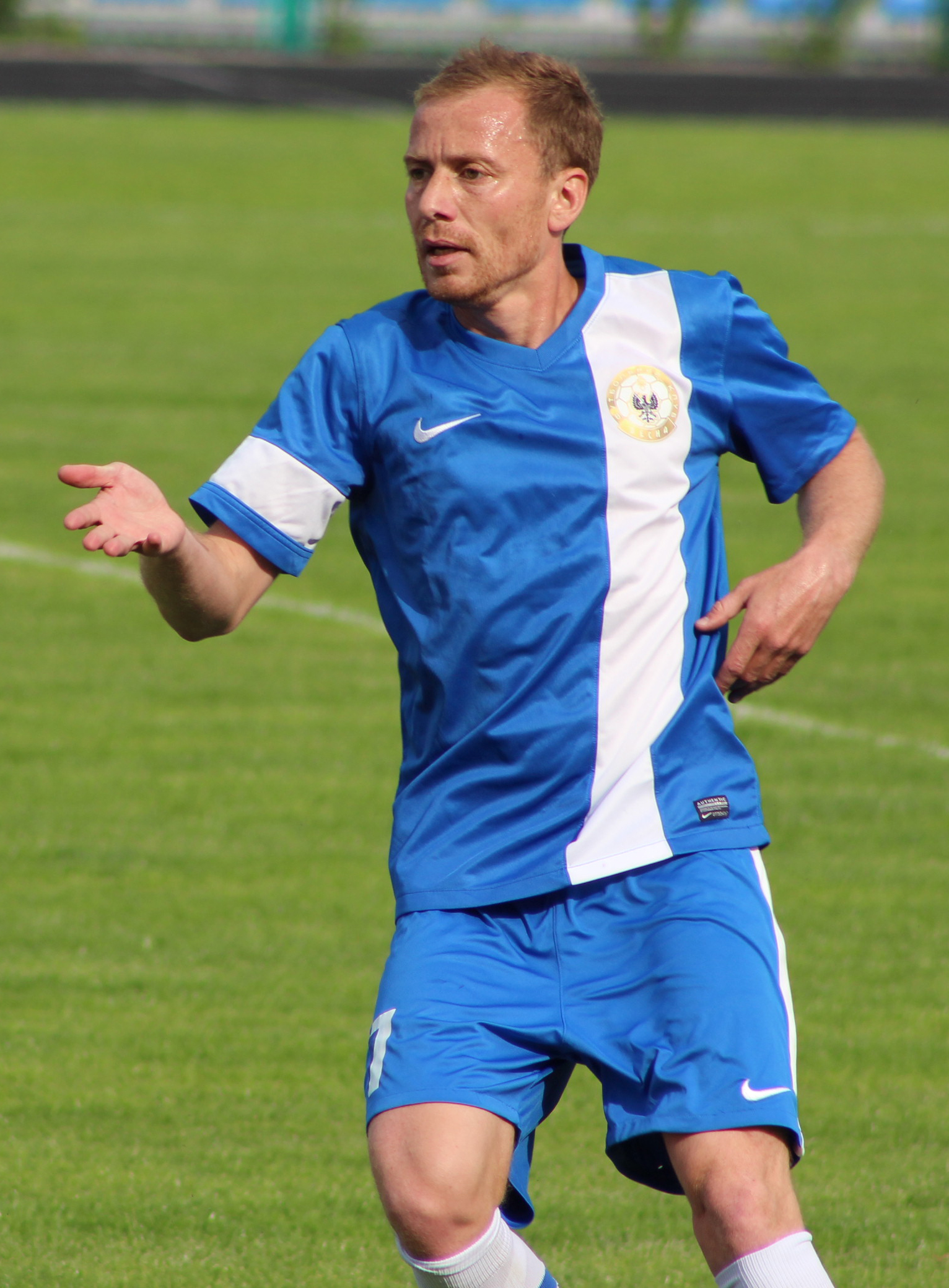

Personal information
- Full name: Andriy Oleksiyovych Smalko
- Date of birth: 12 January 1981 (age 45)
- Place of birth: Chornobyl, Soviet Union (now Ukraine)
- Height: 1.82 m (6 ft 0 in)
- Position: Defender

Senior career*
Years	Team	Apps	(Gls)
1997–2003	Borysfen Boryspil	141	(10)
2003–2005	Chornomorets Odesa	20	(3)
2005–2006	Tavriya Simferopol	12	(0)
2006–2007	Zorya Luhansk	22	(3)
2006–2008	Kharkiv	25	(1)
2008–2009	Stal Alchevsk	31	(0)
2009–2010	Oleksandriya	27	(2)
2010–2012	Zirka Kropyvnytskyi	67	(5)
2012–2013	Tytan Armiansk	33	(1)
2013	Zirka Kropyvnytskyi	4	(0)
2013–2016	Desna Chernihiv	42	(0)
2015–2017	Arsenal Kyiv	6	(0)
2016–2017	Patriot Baryshivka Raion	9	(1)
2017–2020	Avanhard Bziv	25	(0)

International career^{‡}
1999–2000	Ukraine U19	?	(?)
2008–2009	Ukraine U20	3	(0)
2010	Ukraine U21	9	(0)

Managerial career
- 2018–: Desna Chernihiv (technical director)
- * Club domestic league appearances and goals as of 9 December 2020 ‡ National team caps and goals as of 9 December 2020

Andriy Oleksiyovych Smalko (Ukrainian: Андрій Олексійович Смалько; born 12 January 1981) is a Ukrainian retired football player.

== Career ==
In 1997, he started his career for Borysfen Boryspil, where he stayed for five seasons, and he won the Ukrainian Second League in the season 1999–2000.

== International ==
He was called in Ukraine U19, in Ukraine U20 and in Ukraine U21. With Ukraine U20, he participated at the 2001 FIFA World Youth Championship tournament in Argentina, where he got into the Knockout stage against Paraguay.

== Honours ==
Avanhard Bziv

- Ukrainian Amateur Cup: 2018–19
- Kyiv Oblast Championship: 2017, 20182019, 2019

Borysfen Boryspil

- Ukrainian Second League: 1999–2000

Arsenal Kyiv

- Ukrainian Second League: 2015–16

== Gallery ==
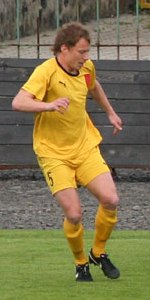
Andriy Smalko with FC Zirka Kirovohrad

Andriy Smalko

== See also ==
- 2001 FIFA World Youth Championship squads § Ukraine
