= FC Nyva Buzova =

Ukrainian football club

Nyva Buzova
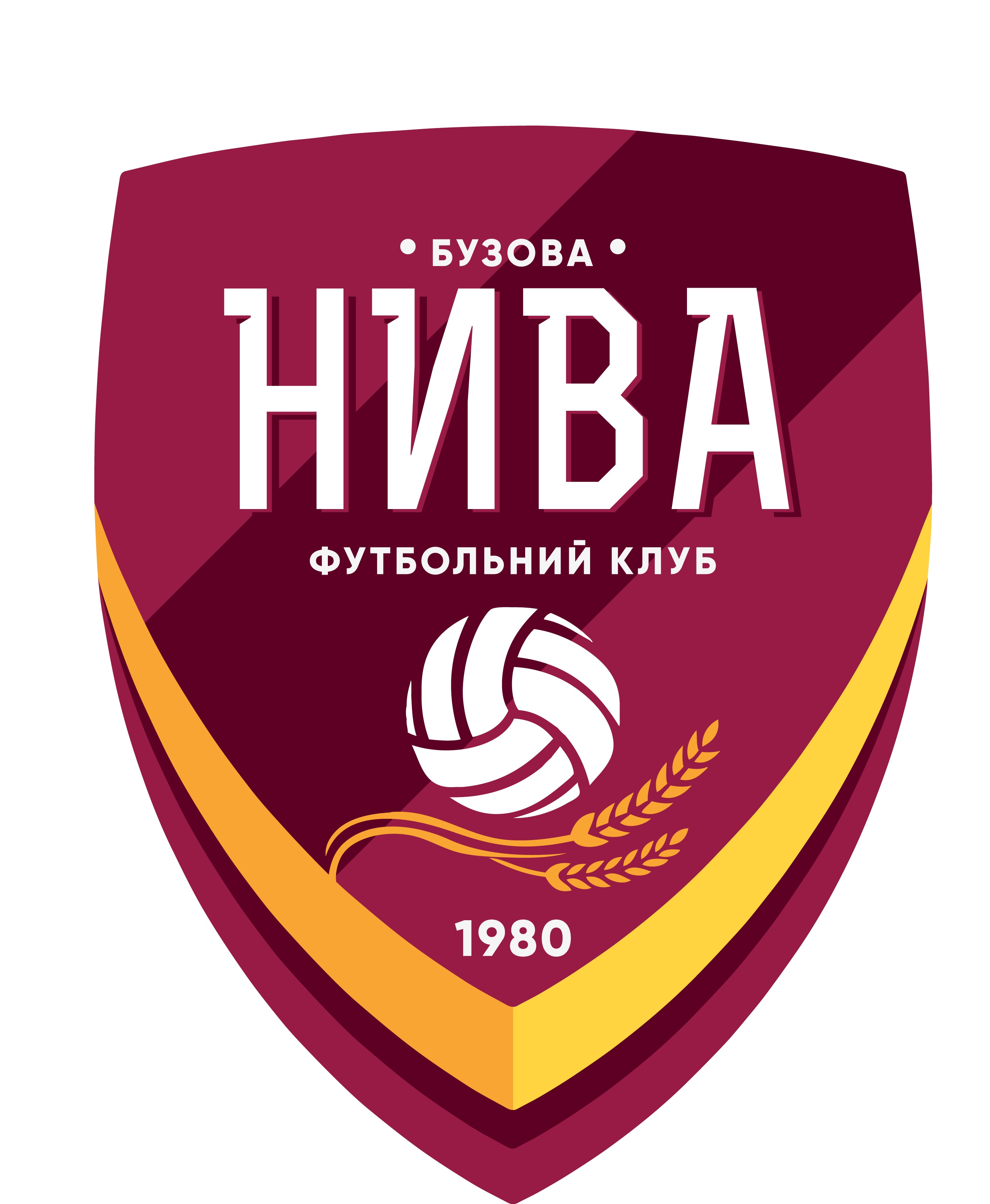
- Full name: Football Club Nyva Buzova
- Founded: 1980
- Dissolved: 2024 (merged with FC Kudrivka)
- Ground: Buzova Arena, Buzova
- Capacity: 253
- Chairman: Roman Solodarenko
- Manager: Roman Loktionov
- League: Ukrainian First League
- 2022–23: Ukrainian Second League, 1st of 10 (champions)
- Website: https://fckudrivka.com/

Football Club Nyva Buzova (Ukrainian: Футбольний клуб Нива Бузова) was a Ukrainian football team from Buzova, Bucha Raion which is about 34 km (21 mi) west of Kyiv on the highway Kyiv – Zhytomyr.

== History ==
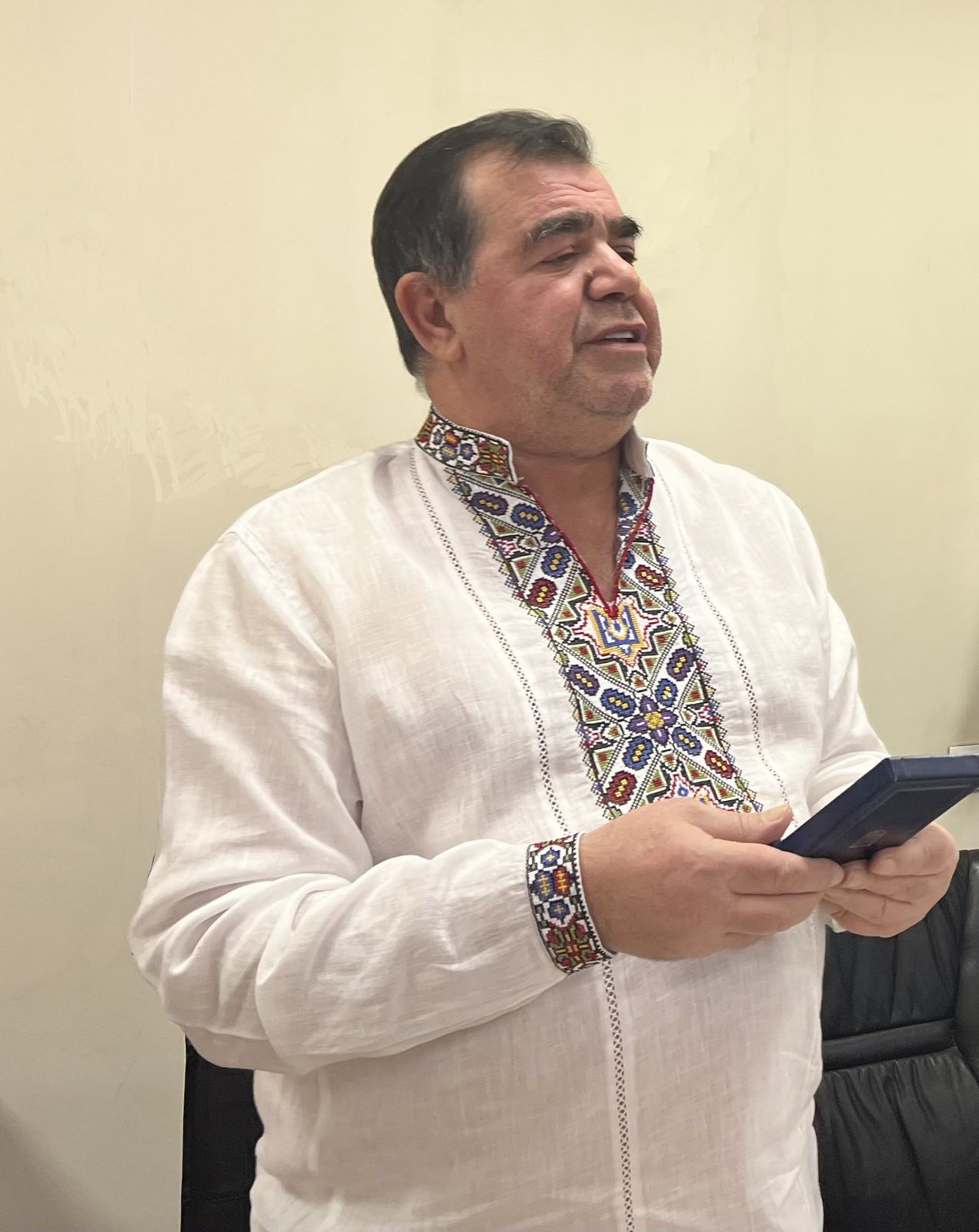
Oktay Efendiyev

The club traces its heritage when in 1980 a football team was created at the Soviet farm Buzivsky by local engineer Vasyl Kryzhevsky who worked as a sports instructor on voluntary basis. The created team was part of the Kolos sports society. It participated in competitions predominantly at district level (Kyiv-Stvyatoshyno Raion); at regional level (Kyiv Oblast) it competed irregularly with the longest pause between 2009 and 2017 due to reconstruction of the local stadium.

In 2005 and 2006 Buzova was represented by another club Hran that became the 2006 AAFU League finalist.

The Nyva Buzova was revamped in 2019 by Oktay Efendiyev, who started to finance the team and on efforts of whom the club received own training camp and football academy. In Ukraine Oktay Efendiyev is known as the chairman of the Congress of Ukrainian Azerbaijanis. The newly built training base has stretched to some 340 m^{2} (3,700 sq ft). The stadium, Buzova Arena, with artificial turf was built within 6 month has 253 seating capacity and has four floodlight towers to hold matches after the sundown. The club also invited local manager Serhiy Karpenko who led FC Avanhard Bziv to regional championship title three consecutive seasons and won the Ukrainian Amateur Cup, while Marko Martynenko concentrated on coaching at the club's academy. Since 2019, the club also operates its own football academy.

In 2020 Oktay Efendiyev announced that he has intentions to transform the amateur club into professional. One of the inspirations for such an intention were successes of the neighboring Chaika Petropavlivska-Borshchahivka. In 2020 the club made its debut in the Ukrainian Amateur Cup and in 2021 entered the national amateur competitions finishing at the top of its group.

On 1 December 2023, Ihor Zhabchenko, the club's manager, confirmed that the president of the club is planning to close his football project.

In 2024, there appeared speculations that the club would be merged to FC Kudrivka.

== Grounds ==
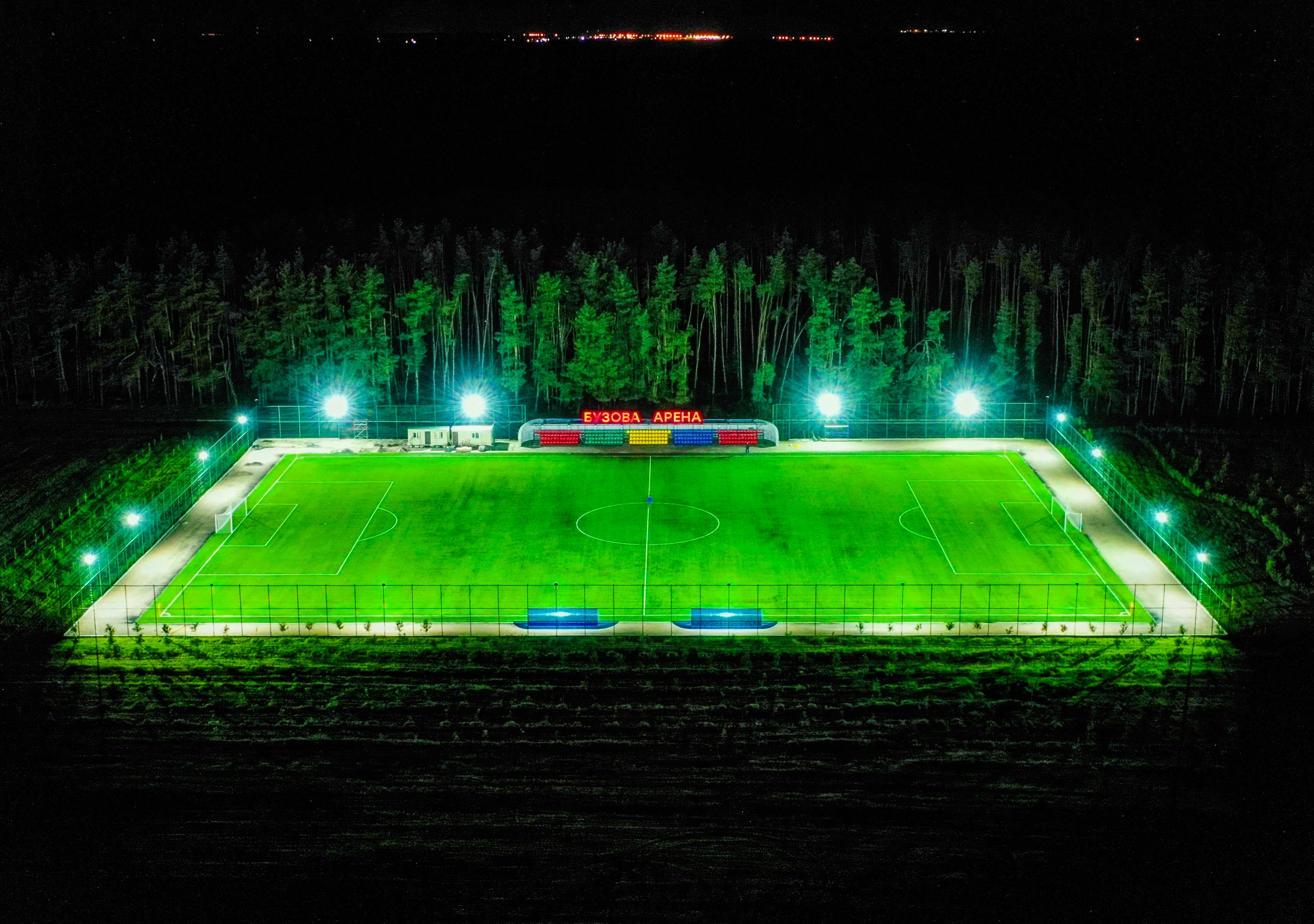
Buzova Arena, summer of 2020 (midnight shot)

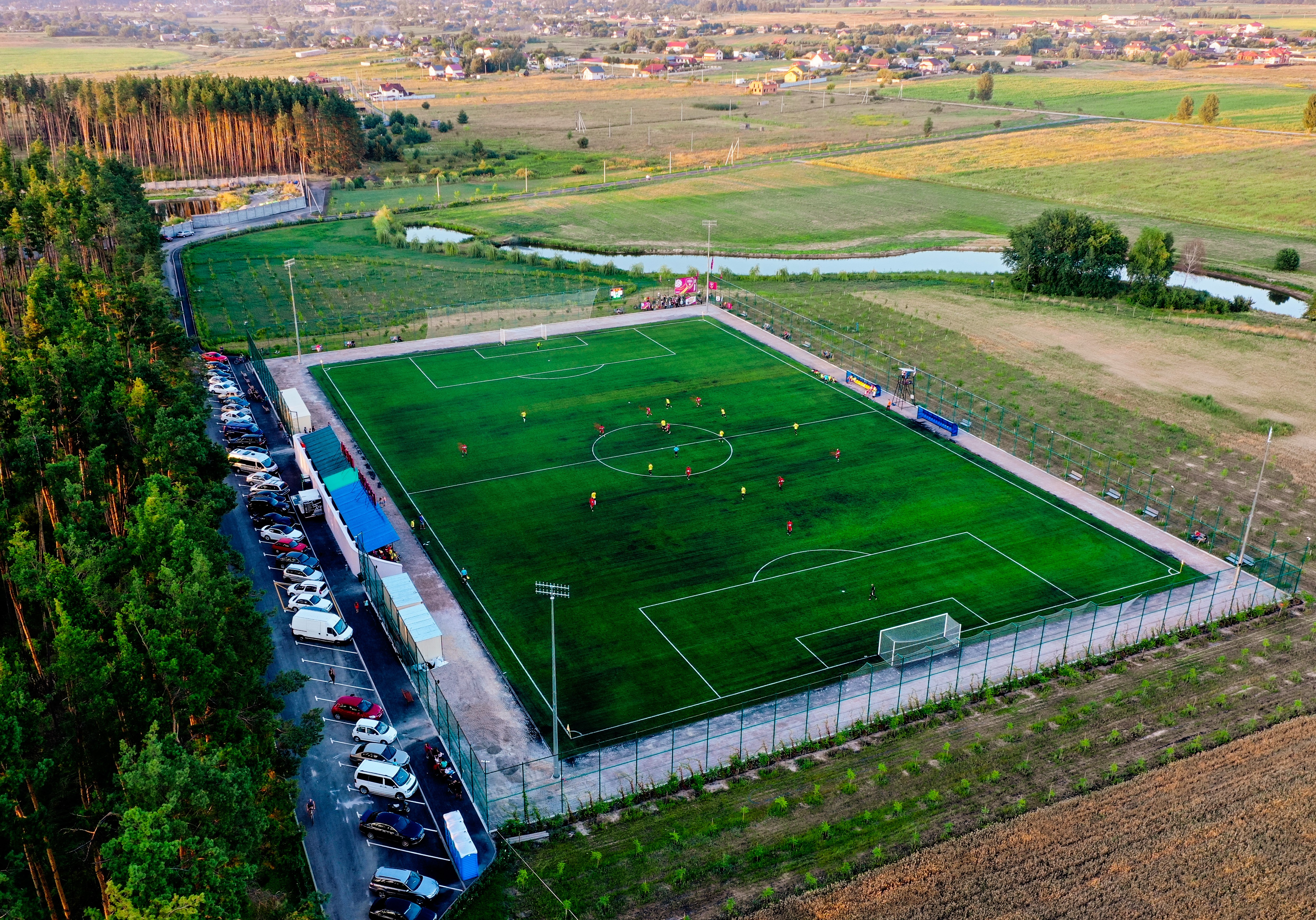
Buzova Arena (aerial view, 2020)

Nyva played at the Buzova Arena in Buzova until 2024.

== Honours ==
Ukrainian Second League

- Winners (1): 2022–23

PFL Winter Cup

- Runner-up: 2023

Ukrainian Football Amateur League

- Winners (1): 2021–22

Kyiv Oblast Football Federation

- Winners (1): : 2021

== Players ==
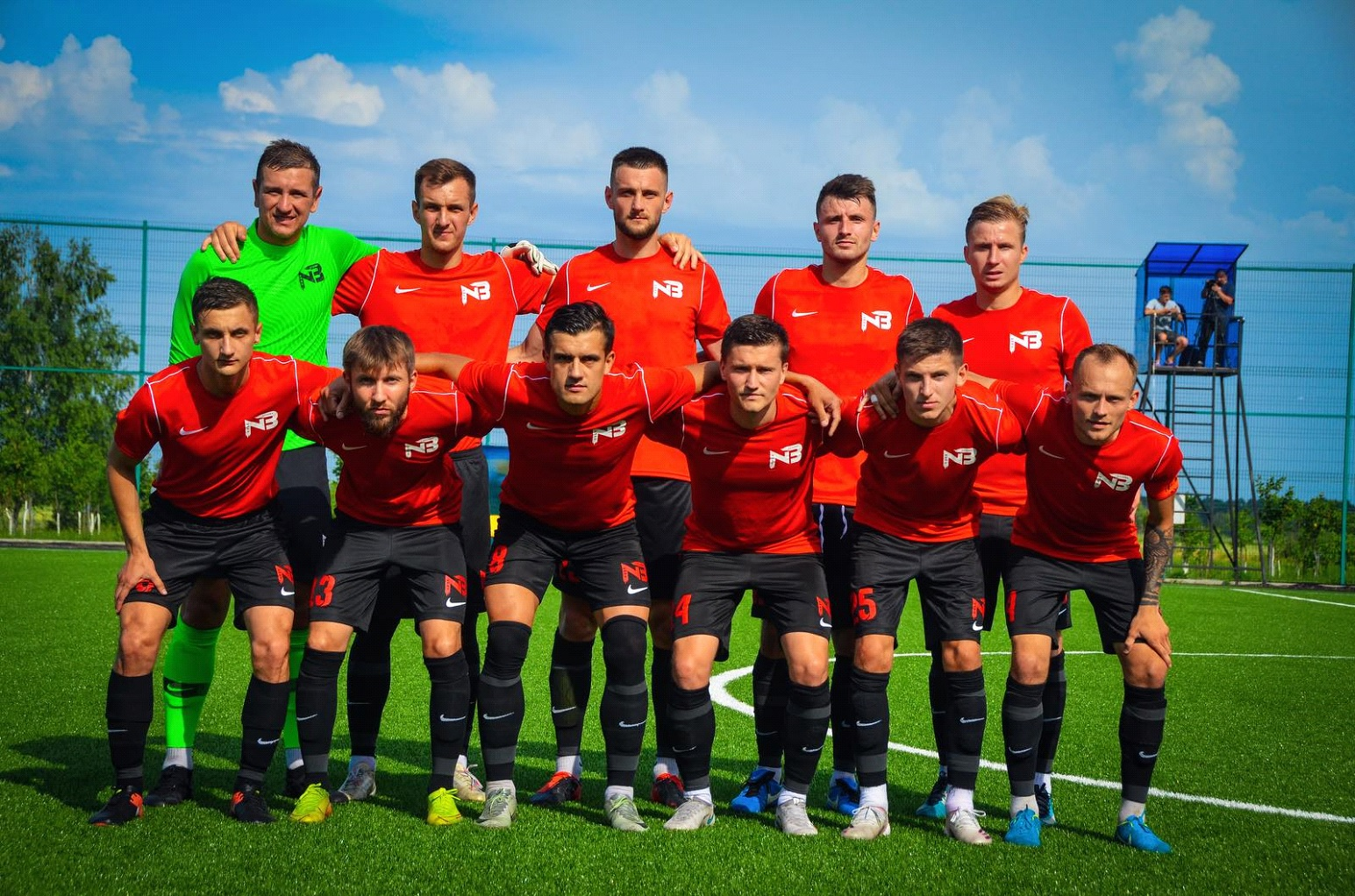
Team squad in August 2021

=== Current squad ===
As of 3 July 2024

Note: Flags indicate national team as defined under FIFA eligibility rules; some limited exceptions apply. Players may hold more than one non-FIFA nationality.

| No. | Pos. | Nation | Player |
|---|---|---|---|
| 1 | GK | UKR | Roman Lyopka |
| 4 | DF | UKR | Oleksandr Nikolyshyn |
| 6 | MF | UKR | Mykola Vechurko |
| 7 | FW | UKR | Dmytro Korkishko |
| 9 | MF | UKR | Vladyslav Nekhtiy |
| 10 | MF | UKR | Danylo Falkovskyi (on loan from Metalurh Zaporizhzhia) |
| 13 | DF | UKR | Oleksandr Mihunov |
| 14 | MF | UKR | Kyrylo Matvyeyev (on loan from Karpaty Lviv) |
| 17 | DF | UKR | Myroslav Serdyuk |
| 20 | MF | UKR | Yevhen Misyura |
| 25 | DF | UKR | Pavlo Zakhidnyi |
| 27 | MF | UKR | Volodymyr Tymenko |

| No. | Pos. | Nation | Player |
|---|---|---|---|
| 32 | GK | UKR | Heorhiy Klimov |
| 35 | DF | UKR | Nikita Teplyakov |
| 39 | DF | UKR | Artem Macheliuk |
| 78 | MF | UKR | Valeriy Rohozynskyi |
| 90 | DF | UKR | Ivan Mamrosenko |
| 91 | FW | UKR | Dmytro Kulyk |
| 95 | GK | UKR | Vladyslav Zakorskyi |
| 99 | DF | UKR | Roman Hahun |
| — | MF | UKR | Andriy Storchous |
| — | MF | UKR | Vladyslav Zorenko |
| — | FW | UKR | Mykyta Makhynya |

== League and cup history ==
| Season | Div. | Pos. | Pl. | W | D | L | GS | GA | P | Domestic Cup | Europe | Notes |
|---|---|---|---|---|---|---|---|---|---|---|---|---|
| 2021–22 | 4th "2" | 1_{/10} | 9 | 8 | 1 | 0 | 23 | 4 | 25 | | | Admitted to Second League |
| 2022–23 | 3rd | 1_{/10} | 18 | 13 | 3 | 2 | 36 | 8 | 42 | | | Promoted |
| 2023–24 | 2nd "A" | 6_{/20} | 28 | 10 | 10 | 8 | 32 | 34 | 40 | | | during winter break changed to Kudrivka-Nyva |

== Head coaches ==
- 2020 – 2021 Marko Martynenko
- 2021 – 2023 Serhiy Karpenko
- 2023 Ihor Zhabchenko
- 2024 Roman Loktionov

=== Coaching staff ===
- Head coach – Roman Loktionov
- Coach – Dmytro Nazarenko
- Coach – Pavlo Shchedrakov
- Goalkeeper coach – Serhiy Karpov
- Coach-analyst – Oleksandr Protchenko
- Fitness coach – Maksym Andreychenko
- Sports director – Anton Svershok
- Nachalnik komandy – Dmytro Avdyshev

== Chairmen/presidents and general directors ==
- 2019 – 2023, Oktay Efendiyev
- 2024, Roman Solodarenko
  - 2024, Yevhen Kushnir (general director)

== See also ==
- FC Hran Buzova
- FC Kudrivka
- Buzova Arena
