= 2021–22 Ukrainian Football Amateur League =

Ukrainian Football season

Ukrainian Amateur Football Championship
- Season: 2021–22
- Dates: 7 August 2021 – 24 February 2022 (Group stage); Play-offs canceled
- Group leaders: Ahron Velyki Hayi; Nyva Buzova; Motor Zaporizhia
- Promoted: 4 – Nyva, Zviahel, Vast, Metalurh-2

The 2021-22 Ukrainian championship in football season was the 26th since it replaced the competition of physical culture clubs.

On 11 August 2020, the AAFU published information about the upcoming season with a tentative composition. The championship started on the 7th of August 2021.

Since the Russo-Ukrainian War grew in its intensity, the competition ended early during its winter recession. No title was awarded.

== Teams ==
=== Returning/reformed clubs ===
- Lokomotyv Kyiv (returning, last played season in 1981; late start)
- Mayak Sarny (returning, last played season in 2014)
- Naftovyk Okhtyrka (returning, last played season in 2003 as its reserve Naftovyk-2 Okhtyrka)
- Prykarpattia-Teplovyk Ivano-Frankivsk (returning, last played season in 2016 as its main team Teplovyk Ivano-Frankivsk)

=== Debut ===
List of teams that are debuting this season in the league:

- Feniks Pidmonastyr
- Olimp Kamianske
- VAST Mykolaiv
- Khliborob Nyzhni Torhayi
- OSDYuShOR-FC Zaporizhia
- Zviahel Novohrad-Volynskyi
- Nyva Buzova
- UCSA Tarasivka Kyiv (late start)
- OFKIP (Piddubny Olympic College)
- Urahan Cherniiv

=== Withdrawn teams ===
List of clubs that took part in last year competition, but chose not to participate in 2021–22 season:

- Borysfen Dnipro
- Kryvbas-2 Kryvyi Rih
- MFC Pervomaisk
- Varatyk Kolomyia
- Votrans Lutsk

Clubs that did not play last season in the league, but showed interest at first yet withdrew before the start of the season:

- FC Sambir

=== Location map ===
The following displays the location of teams.

Location of prospective teams in the 2021-22 Ukrainian Amateur League

=== Stadiums ===
Group A

Team	Stadium	Position in 2020–21
Yunist	Stadion Yunist	Am1, 1st
ODEK	Stadion ODEK	Am1, 2nd
Nyva	Stadion Kolos	Am1, 5th
Dovbush	Stadion Olimpiya	Am1, 6th
Ahron	Tsentralny Stadium; Village Stadium	Am1, 7th
Mayak	Stadion Mriya	Reg
Feniks	Feniks Arena	Reg
Urahan	Stadion Tsentralnyi	Reg
Prykarpattia	Stadion Hirka	Reg
Lokomotyv	Stadion Lokomotyv	Reg

Group B

Team	Stadium	Position in 2020–21
Olimpiya	Stadion Start (Myrhorod)	Am2, 3rd
Kudrivka	Kudrivka Arena	Am2, 4th
Atlet	Stadion DYuSSh Atlet	Am2, 5th
Yednist	Stadion Perspektyva Stadion Kolos	Am2, 7th
Bila Tserkva	Stadion Zmina	Am2, 11th
Naftovyk	Naftovyk Stadium	Reg
Zviahel	Stadion Avanhard	Reg
Nyva	Buzova Arena	Reg
Piddubny Olympic College (OFKIP)	Stadion OFKIP	Reg
UCSA	Stadion Neptun (Zabiria)	Reg

Group C

Team	Stadium	Position in 2020–21
Motor	Stadion Motor Sich	Am3, 1st
Kakhovka	Stadion Olimpiyskyi	Am3, 7th
Metalurh-2	Metalurh Training base	Am3, 8th
Lehioner	Stadion Olimpiyski Rezervy	Am3, 11th
Zirka	Stadion Zirka	Am3, 12th
Khliborob	Khliborob	Reg
VAST	Central Stadium (upper field)	Reg
Olimp	Stadion Nadia	Reg
OSDYuShOR	Stadion Himnazii No.8	Reg

Notes:

- Reg — regional championship (Regions of Ukraine)
- Am[#] — AAFU championship where sign (#) indicates Group number

== Group stage ==
=== Group 1 ===
Pos	Team	Pld	W	D	L	GF	GA	GD	Pts	Promotion, qualification or relegation
1	Ahron Velyki Hayi	9	7	1	1	18	7	+11	22	
2	Yunist Verkhnia Bilka	9	5	3	1	23	8	+15	18 (Note: Head-to-head points: Yunist 4, Urahan 3, ODEK 1)	Withdrawn after the season
3	Urahan Cherniiv	9	6	0	3	14	12	+2	18	Withdrawn after the season
4	ODEK Orzhiv	9	5	3	1	21	7	+14	18	Withdrawn after the season
5	Feniks Pidmonastyr	9	4	1	4	15	12	+3	13	Withdrawn after the season
6	Mayak Sarny	8	2	3	3	10	9	+1	9 (Note: Head-to-head points: Mayak 3, Prykarpattia 3, Dovbush 0)	Withdrawn after the season
7	Prykarpattia-Teplovyk Ivano-Frankivsk	9	3	0	6	10	25	−15	9	Withdrawn after the season
8	Dovbush Chernivtsi	8	2	3	3	8	12	−4	9	Withdrawn after the season
9	Nyva Terebovlia	9	2	2	5	10	10	0	8	Withdrawn after the season
10	Lokomotyv Kyiv	9	0	0	9	4	31	−27	0	

Source: http://www.aafu.org.ua/
Rules for classification: 1) Points; 2) Wins; 3) Better goal difference; 4) Most goals scored; 5) If any two or more teams has same number of points advantage receive that team that in games with all its opponents that earned same number of points for tiebreak are applied following criteria – 5.1) Points; 5.2) Wins; 5.3) Better goal difference; 5.4) Most goals scored; 6) In event if all criteria for rule 5 are equal, placing for teams is determined according to general criteria for all teams 1, 2, 3, 4; 7) Draw of lots.
Notes:

=== Group 2 ===
Pos	Team	Pld	W	D	L	GF	GA	GD	Pts	Promotion, qualification or relegation
1	Nyva Buzova	9	8	1	0	23	4	+19	25	Admission to Ukrainian Second League
2	Kudrivka	9	7	2	0	26	4	+22	23	Withdrawn after the season
3	Olimpiya Savyntsi	9	7	0	2	21	7	+14	21	
4	Naftovyk Okhtyrka	9	6	1	2	16	7	+9	19	
5	Atlet Kyiv	9	5	0	4	20	13	+7	15	
6	Zvyahel Novohrad-Volynskyi	9	4	0	5	8	15	−7	12	Admission to Ukrainian Second League
7	OFKIP Kyiv	9	3	0	6	6	16	−10	9	Withdrawn after the season
8	UCSA Kyiv	9	1	1	7	9	20	−11	4	Withdrawn after the season
9	Bila Tserkva	9	0	2	7	4	25	−21	2	Withdrawn after the season
10	Yednist Kyiv	9	0	1	8	7	29	−22	1	Withdrawn after the season

Source: http://www.aafu.org.ua/
Rules for classification: 1) Points; 2) Wins; 3) Better goal difference; 4) Most goals scored; 5) If any two or more teams has same number of points advantage receive that team that in games with all its opponents that earned same number of points for tiebreak are applied following criteria – 5.1) Points; 5.2) Wins; 5.3) Better goal difference; 5.4) Most goals scored; 6) In event if all criteria for rule 5 are equal, placing for teams is determined according to general criteria for all teams 1, 2, 3, 4; 7) Draw of lots.

=== Group 3 ===
Pos	Team	Pld	W	D	L	GF	GA	GD	Pts	Promotion, qualification or relegation
1	Motor Zaporizhzhia	8	8	0	0	28	2	+26	24	
2	Metalurh-2 Zaporizhzhia	8	4	3	1	20	8	+12	15	Admission to Ukrainian Second League
3	Khliborob Nyzhni Torhayi	8	3	3	2	9	11	−2	12	Withdrawn after the season
4	VAST Mykolaiv	8	2	4	2	14	16	−2	10 (Note: Head-to-head most goals scored: VAST 14, Zirka 11)	Admission to Ukrainian Second League
5	Zirka Kropyvnytskyi	8	2	4	2	11	13	−2	10	
6	Olimp Kamianske	8	2	3	3	11	11	0	9	Withdrawn after the season
7	SC Kakhovka	8	2	1	5	8	23	−15	7	Withdrawn after the season
8	Lehioner Dnipro	8	1	3	4	11	20	−9	6	Withdrawn after the season
9	OSDYuShOR-FC Zaporizhia	8	0	3	5	8	16	−8	3	Withdrawn after the season

Source: http://www.aafu.org.ua/
Rules for classification: 1) Points; 2) Wins; 3) Better goal difference; 4) Most goals scored; 5) If any two or more teams has same number of points advantage receive that team that in games with all its opponents that earned same number of points for tiebreak are applied following criteria – 5.1) Points; 5.2) Wins; 5.3) Better goal difference; 5.4) Most goals scored; 6) In event if all criteria for rule 5 are equal, placing for teams is determined according to general criteria for all teams 1, 2, 3, 4; 7) Draw of lots.
Notes:

== Final stage ==
To the stage qualify eight teams, selection of which is determined exclusively by the AAFU Commission in conducting competitions. Both stages quarterfinals and semifinals consist of two legs (home and away). The final game is scheduled to take place at neutral field. The stage was canceled as competition ended early.

== Promotions to the Second League ==
The amateur teams are allowed to participate in the Ukrainian championship among teams of the 2022–23 Ukrainian Second League under such conditions:

- Team participated in the Ukrainian championship among amateur teams throughout the 2021–22 season and was a participant of the championship play-off stage.
- The club received a license in accordance to the Regulation on licensing of football clubs of the Ukrainian Second League.
- The club and its results of participation in the AAFU competitions meet the requirements that are defined in regulations of the All-Ukrainian competitions in football among clubs' teams of the 2021–22 Professional Football League of Ukraine.

== Number of teams by region ==
Number	Region	Team(s)
5	Kyiv	Atlet, Yednist, OFKIP, UCSA, Lokomotyv
3	Zaporizhia Oblast	Motor Zaporizhia, Metalurh-2 Zaporizhia, OSDYuShOR Zaporizhia
2	Dnipropetrovsk Oblast	Olimp Kamianske, Lehioner Dnipro
2	Ivano-Frankivsk Oblast	Prykarpattia-Teplovyk Ivano-Frankivsk, Urahan Cherniiv
2	Kherson Oblast	SC Kakhovka, Khliborob Nyzhni Torhayi
2	Kyiv Oblast	Nyva Buzova, FC Bila Tserkva
2	Lviv Oblast	Yunist Verkhnia Bilka, Feniks Pidmonastyr
2	Rivne Oblast	ODEK Orzhiv, Mayak Sarny
2	Ternopil Oblast	Ahron Velyki Hayi, Nyva Terebovlya
1	Chernihiv Oblast	FC Kudrivka
1	Chernivtsi Oblast	Dovbush Chernivtsi
1	Kirovohrad Oblast	Zirka Kropyvnytskyi
1	Mykolaiv Oblast	Vast Mykolaiv
1	Poltava Oblast	Olimpiya Savyntsi
1	Sumy Oblast	Naftovyk Okhtyrka

== See also ==
- 2021-22 Ukrainian Amateur Cup
- 2021-22 Ukrainian Second League
- 2021-22 Ukrainian First League
- 2021-22 Ukrainian Premier League
