= Volodymyr Bondarenko (footballer) =

Ukrainian footballer

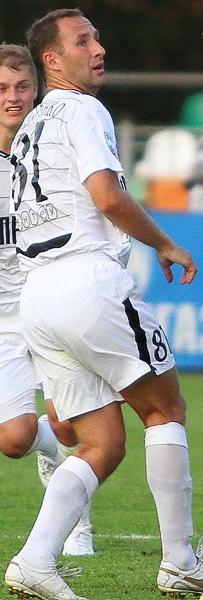
- With Torpedo Moscow in 2011

Personal information
- Full name: Volodymyr Petrovych Bondarenko
- Date of birth: 6 July 1981 (age 45)
- Place of birth: Kyiv, Ukrainian SSR, Soviet Union
- Height: 1.79 m (5 ft 10 1/2 in)
- Position: Midfielder

Youth career
- Dynamo Kyiv

Senior career*
Years	Team	Apps	(Gls)
1999–2003	CSKA / Arsenal Kyiv	25	(1)
1999–2003	→ CSKA-2 / CSKA Kyiv	77	(6)
2000	→ Systema-Boreks Borodianka (loan)	1	(0)
2002	→ Borysfen Boryspil (loan)	2	(0)
2003	→ Volyn Lutsk (loan)	1	(0)
2003	→ Arsenal-2 Kyiv	3	(0)
2004	Lisma-Mordovia Saransk	14	(1)
2005	Sokol Saratov	19	(1)
2005	Obolon Kyiv	8	(0)
2006	Sodovik Sterlitamak	33	(0)
2007–2008	Baltika Kaliningrad	65	(12)
2009–2010	Chornomorets Odesa	30	(2)
2010	Dynamo Saint Petersburg	9	(0)
2011–2012	Torpedo Moscow	24	(2)
2012–2013	Oleksandriya	26	(0)
2014	Chaika Petropavlivska Borshchahivka		
2015	Dinaz Vyshhorod	18	(0)
2015–2017	Desna Pohreby	40	(13)

International career
2000	Ukraine U18		
2001	Ukraine U20		
2003	Ukraine (students)		

Managerial career
- 2016–2017: Desna Pohreby
- 2018–2021: Dinaz Vyshhorod
- 2022: Tavriya Simferopol
- 2022–2025: Shturm Ivankiv / Kolos-2 Kovalivka
Medal record
Men's football
Representing Ukraine
UEFA European Under-18 Championship
Runner-up	2000 Germany
- * Club domestic league appearances and goals

Volodymyr Petrovych Bondarenko (Ukrainian: Володимир Петрович Бондаренко; born 6 July 1981) is a Ukrainian footballer and coach.

== Playing career ==
=== Club career ===
Pupil of Dynamo Sports School (Kyiv). The first coach was OV Leonidov. He played for the following teams: CSKA-2 (Kyiv), Sistema-Borex (Boyarka), CSKA Kyiv, Arsenal Kyiv, Lisma-Mordovia Saransk, Sokol-Saratov, Obolon Kyiv, Sodovik (Sterlitamak), Baltika Kaliningrad, Dynamo Saint Petersburg, Torpedo Moscow. The latter left the club in July 2012 on charges of contract matches brought against him by the club. In the summer of 2012 he moved to Oleksandriya. He took 81 numbers in the team. In the 2012/13 season, he and his team became a bronze medalist, the club lost only to Alchevsk "Steel" and "Sevastopol". Bondarenko played in 26 matches. In 2015 he played for the then amateur team Dinaz Vyshhorod, and in 2016 he became the playing coach of the team Desna Pogreby.

=== International career ===
Bondarenko was on the Ukraine roster for the 2003 Summer Universiade.

== Coaching career ==
In 2018 he become the coach of Dinaz Vyshhorod. In the 2020–21 he achieve asecond place Ukrainian Second League. In the season 2021–22 he has been elected best coach of the round 4 Ukrainian Second League.

== Honours ==
Desna Pogreby

- Football cup of Kyiv Oblast: 2017

Dinaz Vyshhorod

- Football cup of Kyiv Oblast: 2015

Ukraine U-18

- 2000 Finalist

Ukraine U-20

- FIFA World Youth Championship
  - 2001 participant

Dinaz Vyshhorod

- Ukrainian Second League: Runner-Up 2020–21

Individual

- Best Coach Round 4 Ukrainian Second League: 2021–22

== See also ==
- 2001 FIFA World Youth Championship squads#Ukraine
