= Tetiana Zasukha =

Ukrainian politician and businesswoman (born 1964)

- Тетяна Засуха
- An official portrait of her from 2007.

People's Deputy of Ukraine
- In office 29 March 1998 – 14 May 2002
- Constituency: Kyiv Oblast, No. 93
- In office 31 March 2002 – 25 May 2006
- Constituency: Kyiv Oblast, No. 94
- In office 25 May 2006 – 23 November 2006
- Constituency: Party of Regions, No. 117
- In office 23 November 2007 – 12 December 2012
- Constituency: Party of Regions, No. 138

Personal details
- Born: Tetiana Volodymyrivna Zasukha; 25 April 1964 (age 62) Polohoy (Vasylkiv Raion), Ukrainian SSR, Soviet Union
- Party: NDP (1998-1999); Party of Regions (1999-2000); Labour Ukraine (2000-2002); For United Ukraine! (2002); Labour Ukraine (2002-2004); Ukrainian Peasant Democratic Party (2004-2005); Party of Regions (2005-2012)
- Spouse: Anatoliy Zasukha
- Children: Andriy Zasukha
- Education: Bila Tserkva National Agrarian University (1986); Kyiv State Pedagogical Institute (1992); Institute of Feed and Agriculture of Podillia of NAAS of Ukraine (1993, 1997)

Tetiana Volodymyrivna Zasukha (Ukrainian: Тетяна Володимирівна Засуха; born 25 April 1964) is a Ukrainian politician and businesswoman who served as a People's Deputy of Ukraine in the Verkhovna Rada representing the 3rd, 4th, 5th, and 6th convocations from 1998 to 2012, mostly with the Party of Regions.

== Early life ==
Zasukha was born on 25 April 1964 in the small village of Polohoy, which was then part of the Ukrainian SSR in the Soviet Union. She is ethnically Ukrainian and the daughter of Antonina Fedotivna Voitenko. After graduating from secondary school, Tetiana decided to pursue higher education, attending the Bila Tserkva National Agrarian University, where she graduated in 1986 with a specialisation as a zooengineer. She continued going to school after this, while simultaneously working as the Chief Zootechnician and Chairman of the collective farm "Shchors" within the Vasylkiv Raion of Kyiv Oblast. Zasukha first graduated from the Kyiv State Pedagogical Institute in 1992 with a specialisation as a biologist, and later finished her candidate dissertation at the Institute of Feed and Agriculture of Podillia of NAAS of Ukraine in 1993. She finally finished her doctoral dissertation, earning her a PhD, in 1997 from the same institute, which covered animal husbandry.

== Business career ==
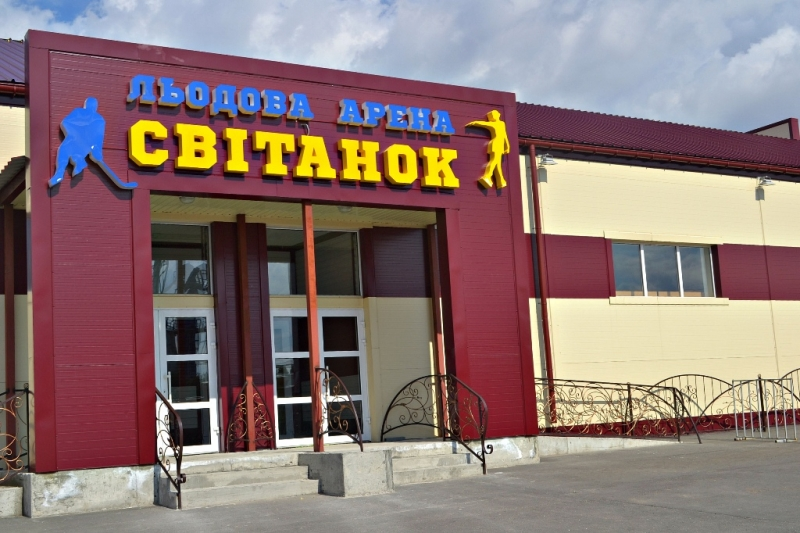
An ice arena in Kovalivka sponsored by Svitanok.

In either 1993 or 1994, she created the agrofirm "Svitanok". Svitanok was founded on the basis of the Shchors collective farm, which she had headed in the Soviet era, and was located in Kovalivka, Kyiv Oblast. During the early 2000s, Svitanok started to expand during her husband's tenure as Governor of Kyiv Oblast, receiving multiple funds from the state budget from 2002-04. The funds went to poultry breeding and livestock, and by around March 2003 Svitanok was producing 120,000 tonnes of sugar beets annually, 30,000 tonnes of grain annually, 25 tonnes of milk a day, and operating other agricultural enterprises also. Gradually, the company also started shifting to leasing land, and it owned about 25,000 hectares by 2009 despite the 2008 financial crisis. That same year, the company also bought out "Chervonskyi Tsukrovyk", a large sugar plant in Zhytomyr Oblast.

By 2011, the amount of land that Svitanok held nearly doubled to 45,000 hectares, with land also being leased in Zhytomyr Oblast. Two years later, the company was allowed by the Antimonopoly Committee of Ukraine to take over five companies: Pologivske and Losiatynske (Kovalivka), Sukholiske and Nadiia (Bila Tserkva Raion), and Svitanok Plius (Zhytomyr Oblast, obtained from HarvEast, owned by oligarch Rinat Akhmetov). This was estimated to increase the amount of land the company owned by 15%. In the late 2010s, the company owned 80,000 hectares, five enterprises, two sugar plants, and a variety of food operations for livestock, meats, and pastas. Svitanok was among the ten largest agricultural enterprises by 2019. By 2026, though, the company was also the largest landowner enterprise in Ukraine.

== Political career ==
Zasukha with Onufriy Berezovsky in Kyiv in 2019.

Zasukha first entered politics in 1994, when she became a deputy of the Kyiv Oblast Council, a position she retained for one convocation until 1998. During the 1998 Ukrainian parliamentary elections, Zasukha ran for constituency No. 93 (Kyiv Oblast) during the Verkhovna Rada's third convocation. She ended up winning the seat and, upon joining the convocation, became a member of the NDP faction for a few months before joining the newly created Party of Regions in February 1999. She stayed there until October 2000, when she joined Labour Ukraine that month, with which she stayed until the end of the convocation. Zasukha then ran for another mandate in the Rada during the 2002 Ukrainian parliamentary elections, this time for constituency No. 94 (also Kyiv Oblast) as an independent. She won with a majority of 50.92% of the vote against thirteen other opponents. During the two years she remained in the 4th convocation, she frequently changed parties, going from For United Ukraine! to Labour Ukraine to Ukrainian Peasant Democratic Party and non-affiliated to Union and finally back to the Party of Regions. For a brief period during this convocation, from July 2004 to May 2005, she was also the leader of the minor agrarian Ukrainian Peasant Democratic Party. Her leadership of the party prior to its July congress, after Serhiy Dovgan stepped down, was already popularly predicted after she was expelled from the ranks of the Agrarian Party of Ukraine alongside Mykhailo Zubets a few weeks prior. The two were expelled after being accused of attempting to split the party and convince members to break away and join the Peasant Party.

Zasukha ran for a third term in 2006 during the 2006 Ukrainian parliamentary elections, but this time, not for a single-mandate constituency, and instead was elected from the party list of the Party of Regions. She was placed No. 117 on the list and was successfully elected. Upon joining the short Rada, she became a member of the faction of the Party of Regions and also retained her membership on the Committee on Agrarian Policy and Land Relations. The 2006 convocation would dissolve early, though, leading to the declaration of the snap 2007 Ukrainian parliamentary elections, in which she ran again. For these elections, she was placed slightly lower on the party list at No. 138, but regardless, managed to enter the Rada for a fourth term. Upon joining the Rada again, she once again joined the faction of the Party of Regions and the Committee on Agrarian Policy and Land Relations.

After the 6th convocation ended in 2012, she would then attempt to run for constituency No. 94 (Obukhiv and Vasylkiv, Kyiv Oblast) instead of the party list. Unlike her previous elections, this one would be fairly controversial. Initially, Zasukha was declared the winner in the constituency against Viktor Romaniuk, a member of the opposition party Batkivshchyna. However, Romaniuk appealed to the Central Election Commission of Ukraine (CEC), alleging widespread voter fraud in favour of Zasukha, which led to nearly around 15-30,000 votes being invalidated at select polling stations. Batkivshchyna claimed that Romaniuk won by 10,000 votes in the constituency. More than 28 lawsuits from both sides also preceded Romaniuk's appeal to the CEC. In November, the CEC accepted the appeal and requested to the Verkhovna to run re-elections in constitutency No. 94, amongst other districts. However, a day later, the Verkhovna Rada said they would not grant the CEC's appeal to repeat the elections, and a court dismissed the claims of Batkivshchyna to recognise the election of Zasukha as illegal. Meanwhile, Romaniuk faced a legal case by senior police investigator, Maksym Zinoruk, who accused Romaniuk of conspiring in 2008 to misappropriate property from the "Indar" insulin plant. Romaniuk was later placed on the Interpol wanted list and was detained in Milan, Italy, and held at San Vittore Prison before the Milan Court of Appeal released him. In January 2013, with the election still not clear even after the convocation had started, the European Court of Justice accepted the complaint of Romaniuk. Elections were finally held in late 2013, although the Supreme Administrative Court of Ukraine declared Romaniuk's candidacy illegal, leaving just Zasukha as a candidate, but she withdrew amid the growing Euromaidan, which gave the victory to fellow Party of Regions candidate Ruslan Badaev.

== Personal life ==
Tetiana is married to Anatoliy Zasukha, a fellow politician who was Governor of Kyiv and Chairman of the Kyiv Oblast Council. Anatoliy was known to be especially close to former President Leonid Kuchma, and in 2005, Tetiana said there was an assassination attempt on her husband by Berkut officers after he faced numerous criminal cases, forcing him to later hide in Russia. As of 2005, they live in a house in Kovalivka, where Svitanok is registered. They have one son, Andriy Zasukha, a former footballer and businessman who is the President of the Kyiv Oblast Football Association and a deputy of the Kyiv Oblast Council with the Yulia Tymoshenko Bloc. Her niece, Natalia, is also a politician and was included in the party list of European Solidarity in the Kyiv Oblast Council in 2015.

== Honours and awards ==
Zasukha has been awarded the following honours:

- Honorary Award of the President of Ukraine (1995)
- Order of Merit, II degree (1998)
- Order of Merit, I degree (2001)
- Hero of Ukraine (Order of State as a civilian, 21 August 2003)
- Order of the Holy Equal-to-the-Apostles Princess Olga (by the Russian Orthodox Church (ROC), 2004)
