= Volodymyr Bondarenko =

Vladimir or Volodymyr Bondarenko may refer to:

- Vladimir Bondarenko (football coach) (1955–2016), Russian football coach
- Volodymyr Bondarenko (footballer) (born 1981), Ukrainian footballer and coach
- Volodymyr Bondarenko (politician) (1952–2021), Ukrainian politician, People's Deputy of Ukraine
