= Dmytro Kasabutskyi =

Ukrainian footballer

Personal information
- Full name: Dmytro Mykhaylovych Kasabutskyi
- Date of birth: 19 July 2000 (age 26)
- Place of birth: Kyiv, Ukraine
- Height: 1.84 m (6 ft 1/2 in)
- Position: Defender

Youth career
- 2014: Youth Sportive School Kyiv-Sviatoshyn
- 2014–2017: Knyazha Shchaslyve
- 2017–2018: Lyubomyr Stavyshche

Senior career*
Years	Team	Apps	(Gls)
2018–2019	Lyubomyr Stavyshche (amateurs)	6	(1)
2019–2020	Avanhard Bziv (amateurs)	9	(4)
2020–2021	Rubikon Kyiv	1	(0)
2020–2021	→ Olimpik Donetsk (loan)	0	(0)
- * Club domestic league appearances and goals as of 20 May 2021

Dmytro Mykhaylovych Kasabutskyi (Ukrainian: Дмитро Михайлович Касабуцький; born 19 July 2000) is a Ukrainian football defender.

== Career ==
Born in Kyiv, Kasabutskyi is a product of the Kyiv Oblast youth sportive schools.

Kasabutskyi played in the Ukrainian clubs of the different league levels, until September 2020, when he signed on loan contract with the Ukrainian Premier League FC Olimpik Donetsk. He not made his debut for Olimpik in the Ukrainian Premier League, but is currently playing in the Ukrainian Premier League Reserves.
