= Buzova Arena =

Chernihiv, Ukraine sports stadium

- Бузова Арена
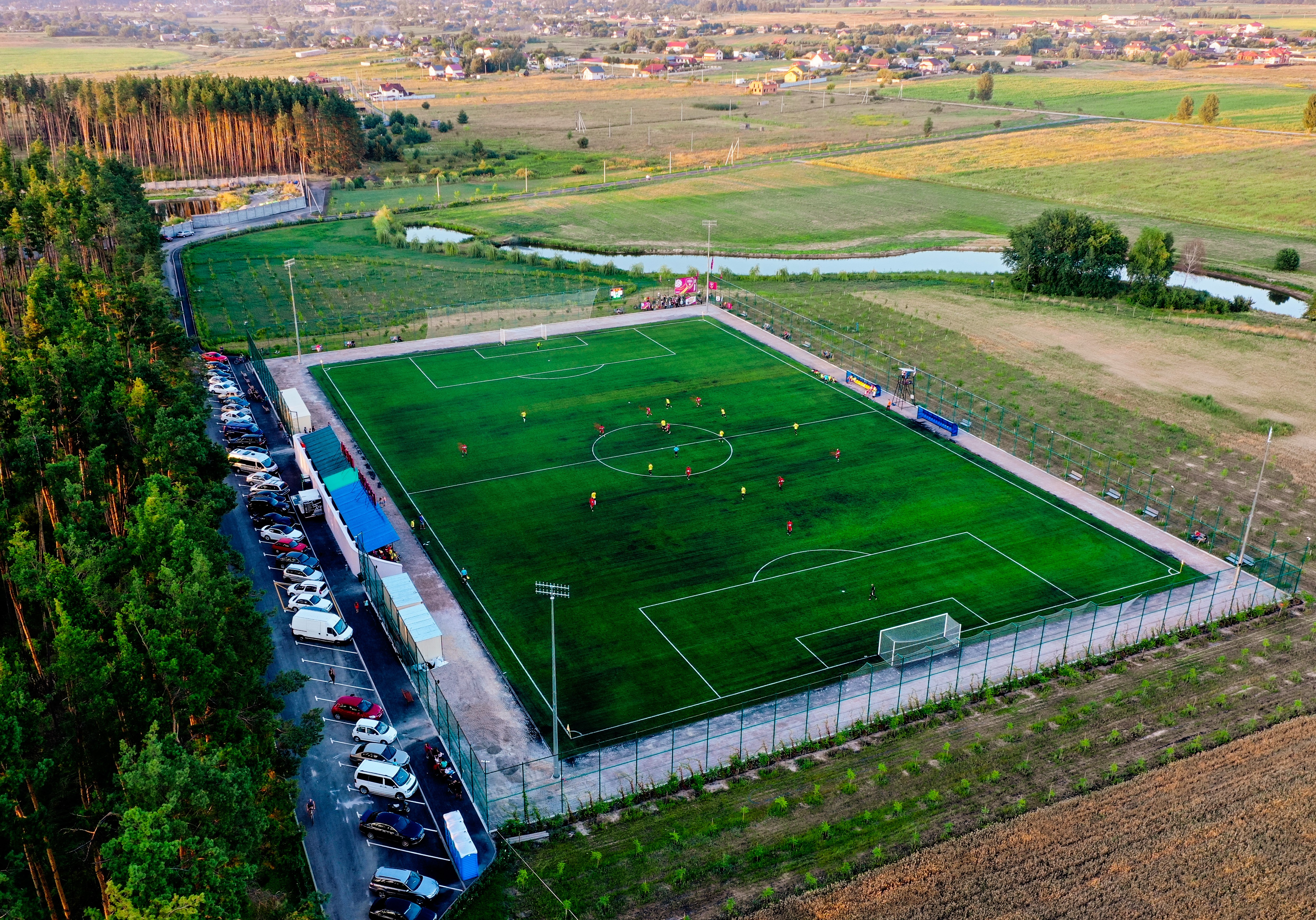
- Interactive map of Buzova Arena
- Location: Buzova, Ukraine 14039
- Coordinates: 50°24′59″N 30°02′30″E
- Owner: FC Kudrivka
- Operator: FC Kudrivka; Nyva Buzova; Lisne
- Capacity: 253
- Surface: Artificial grass

Construction
- Opened: 2018

Tenants
- Nyva Buzova from 2018 until 2024; Kudrivka since 2024 until 2025; Lisne 2024; UCSA Tarasivka since 2025; Kudrivka U19 since 2025

Buzova Arena (Ukrainian: Бузова Арена) is a football stadium in Buzova, Ukraine. The stadium is the training ground of FC Kudrivka.

== Description ==
The Buzova Arena with artificial turf was built within 6 month has 253 seating capacity and has four floodlight towers to hold matches after the sundown.

== History ==
On 4 September 2022, the Buzova Arena hosted the first match of the 2022–23 Ukrainian Second League between Nyva Buzova and SC Chaika.

On 28 July 2023, the Arena hosted also the first match of the 2023–24 Ukrainian First League between Nyva Buzova and Ahrobiznes Volochysk.

After the merger of Nyva Buzova with FC Kudrivka, the new owner Roman Solodarenko, transformed the arena into a football base where new players are selected.

== Using ==
- The stadium hosted some home matches of Nyva Buzova for the Ukrainian Second League and Ukrainian First League before merched with FC Kudrivka.
- The stadium hosts some home matches of FC Kudrivka for the Ukrainian First League.
- The stadium is also used by FC Lisne for the Ukrainian Amateur Championship
- In 2025, the stadium is also used by UCSA Tarasivka for the Ukrainian First League

== Gallery ==
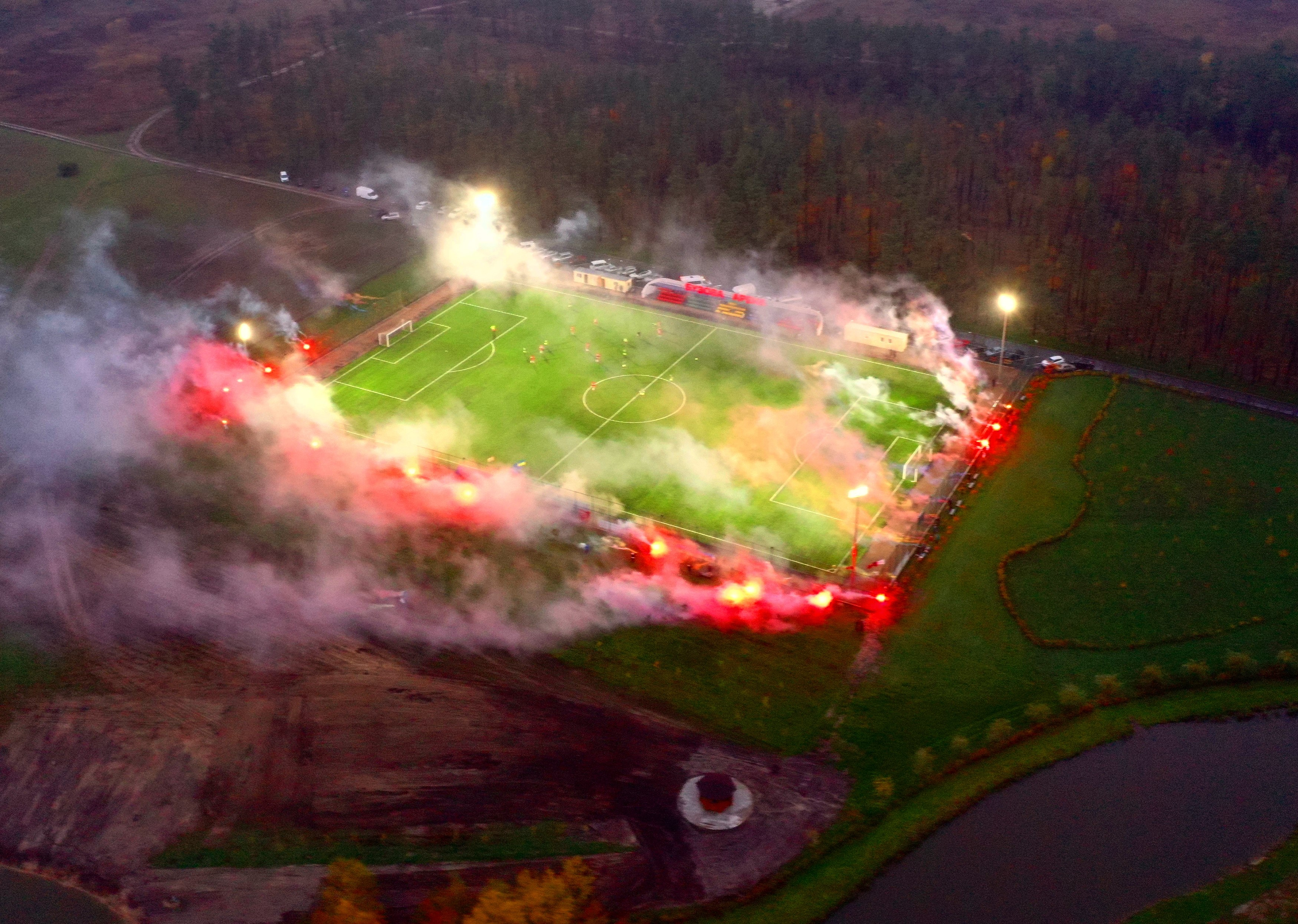

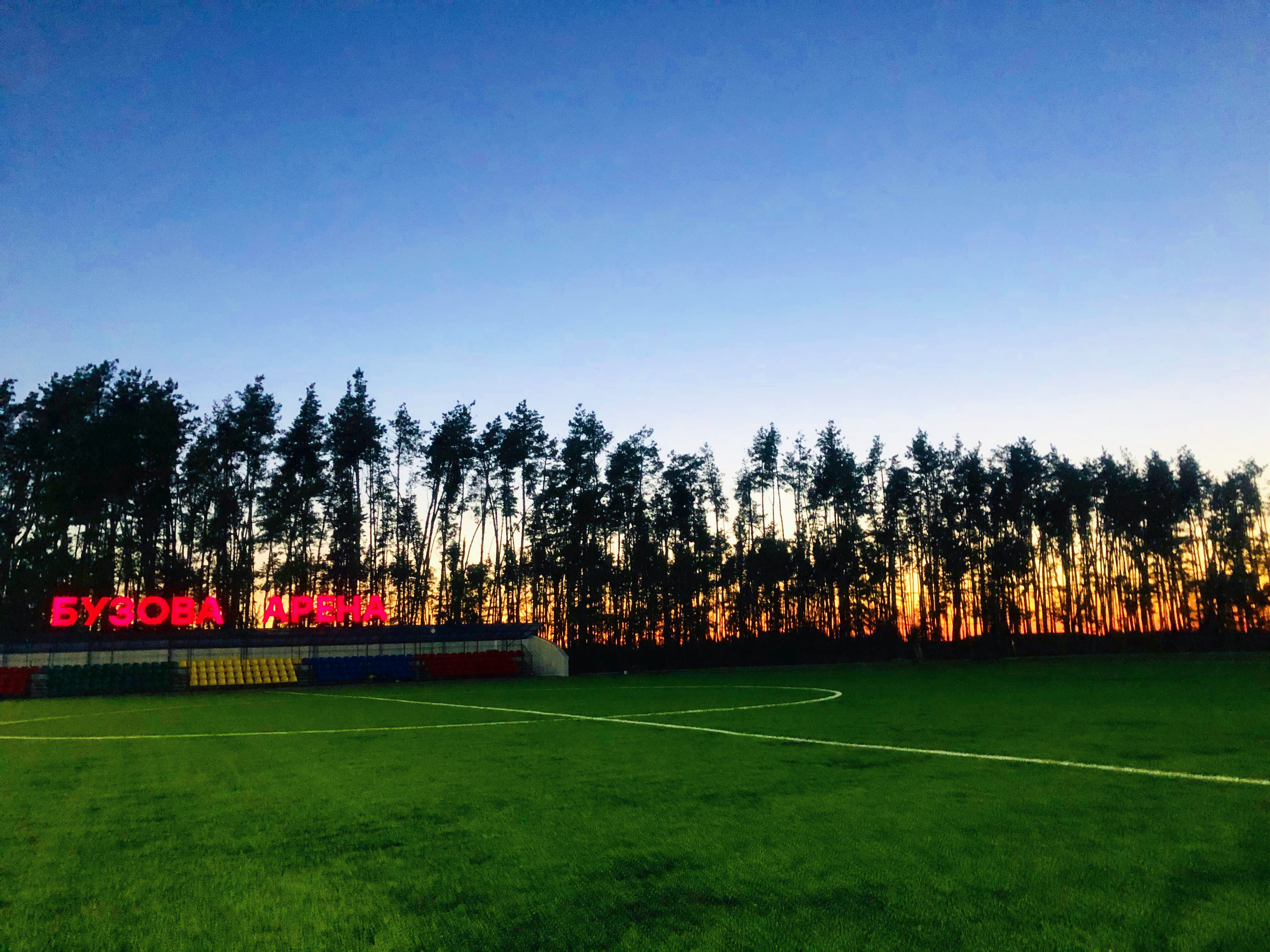

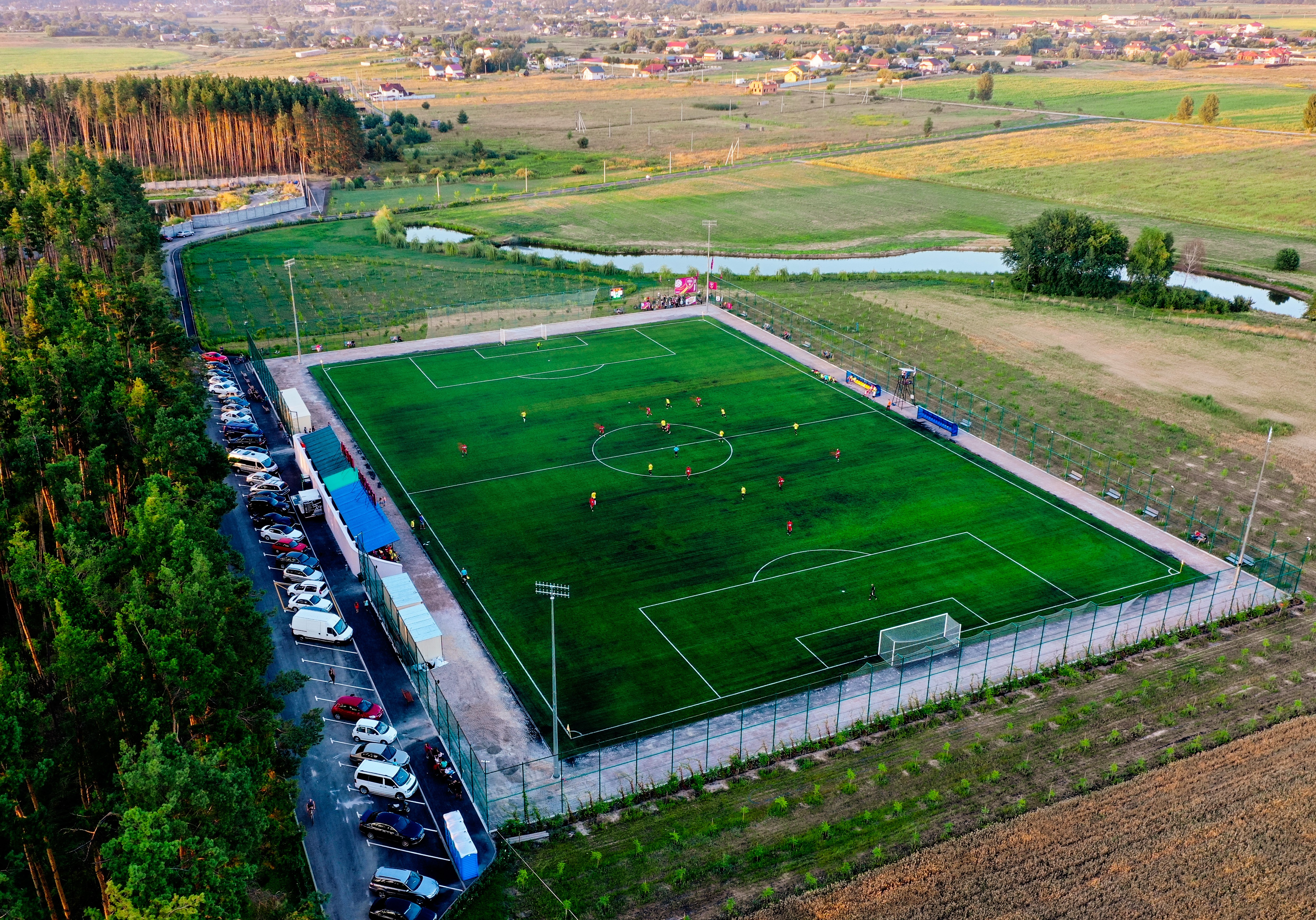
Buzova Arena (aerial view, 2020)

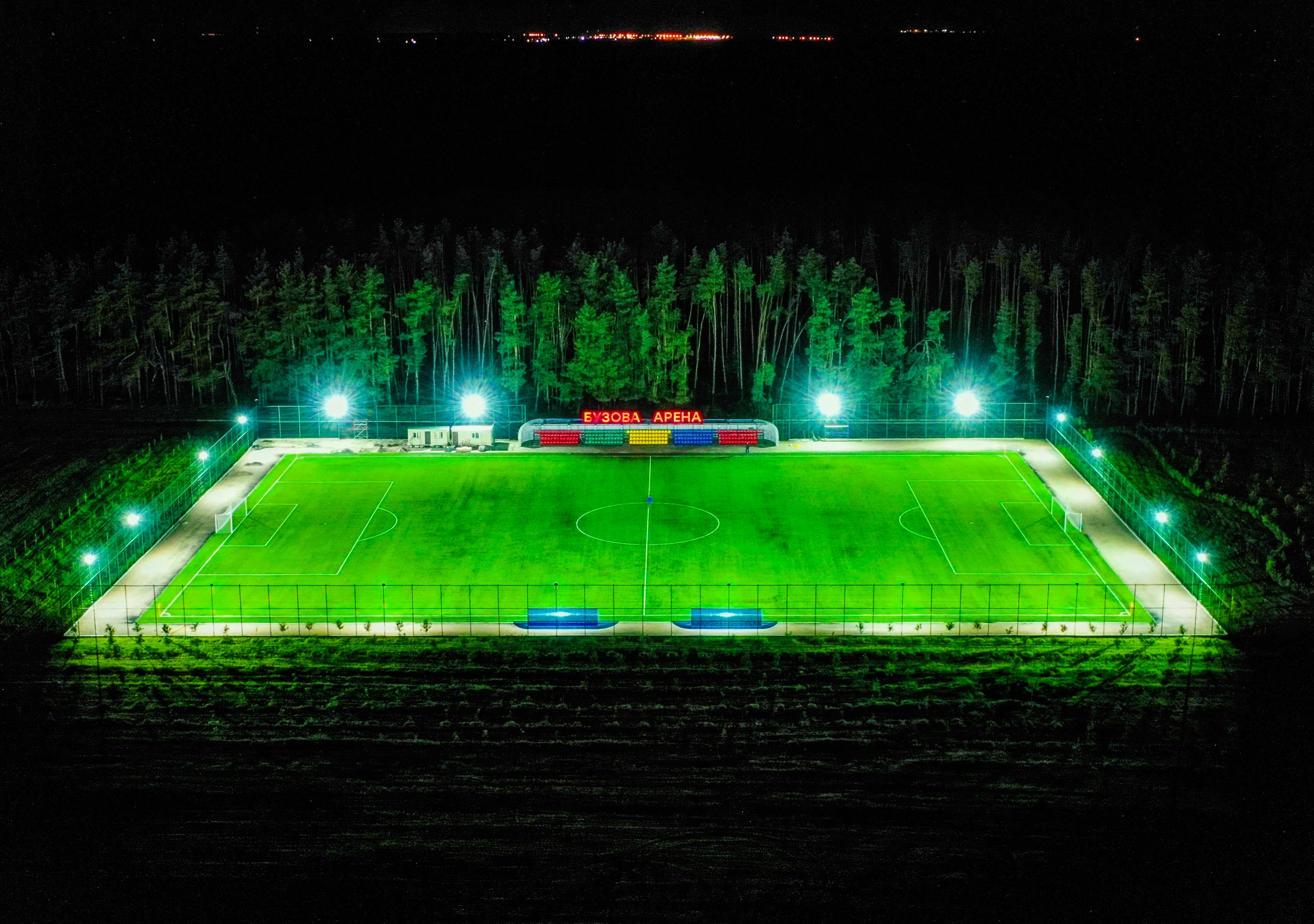

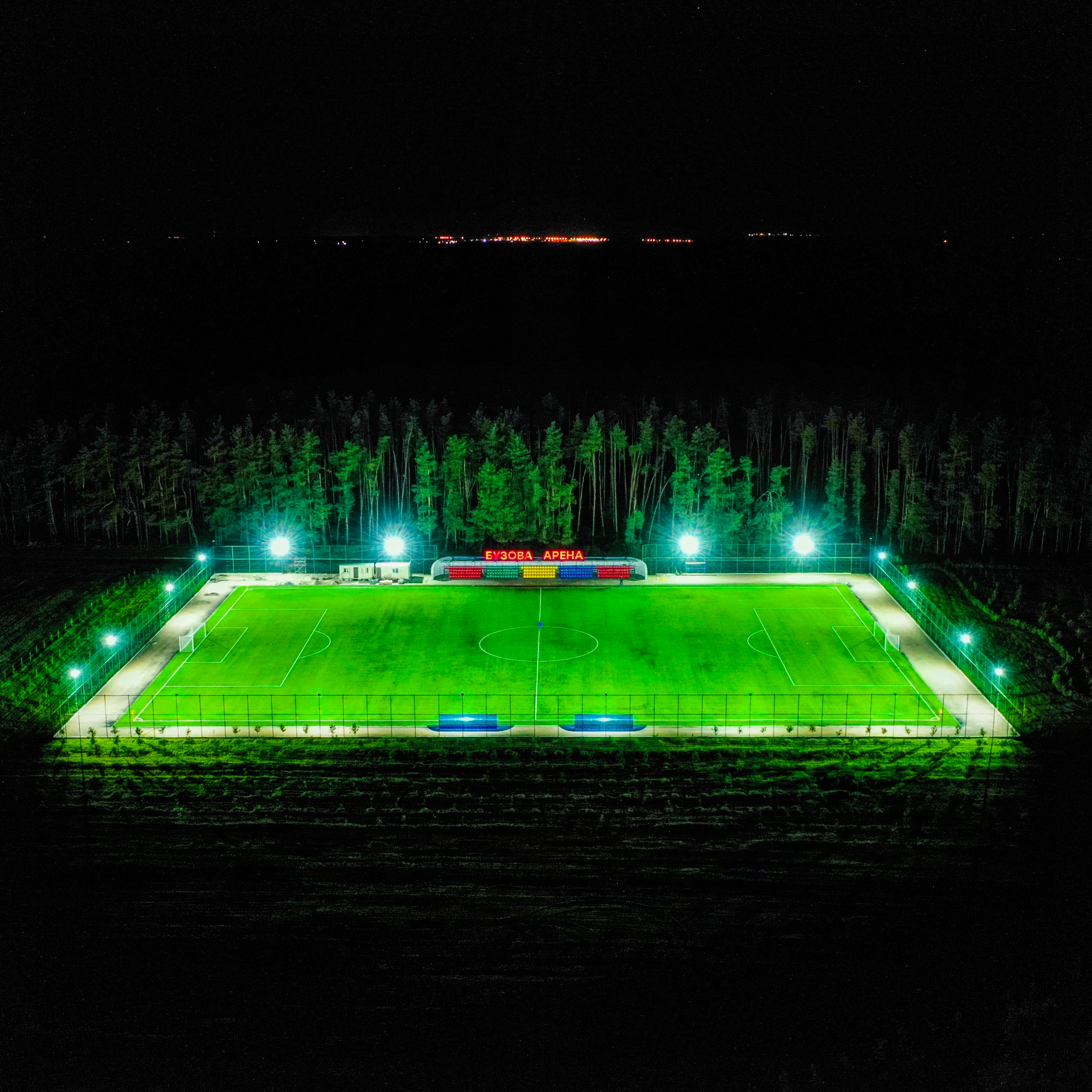

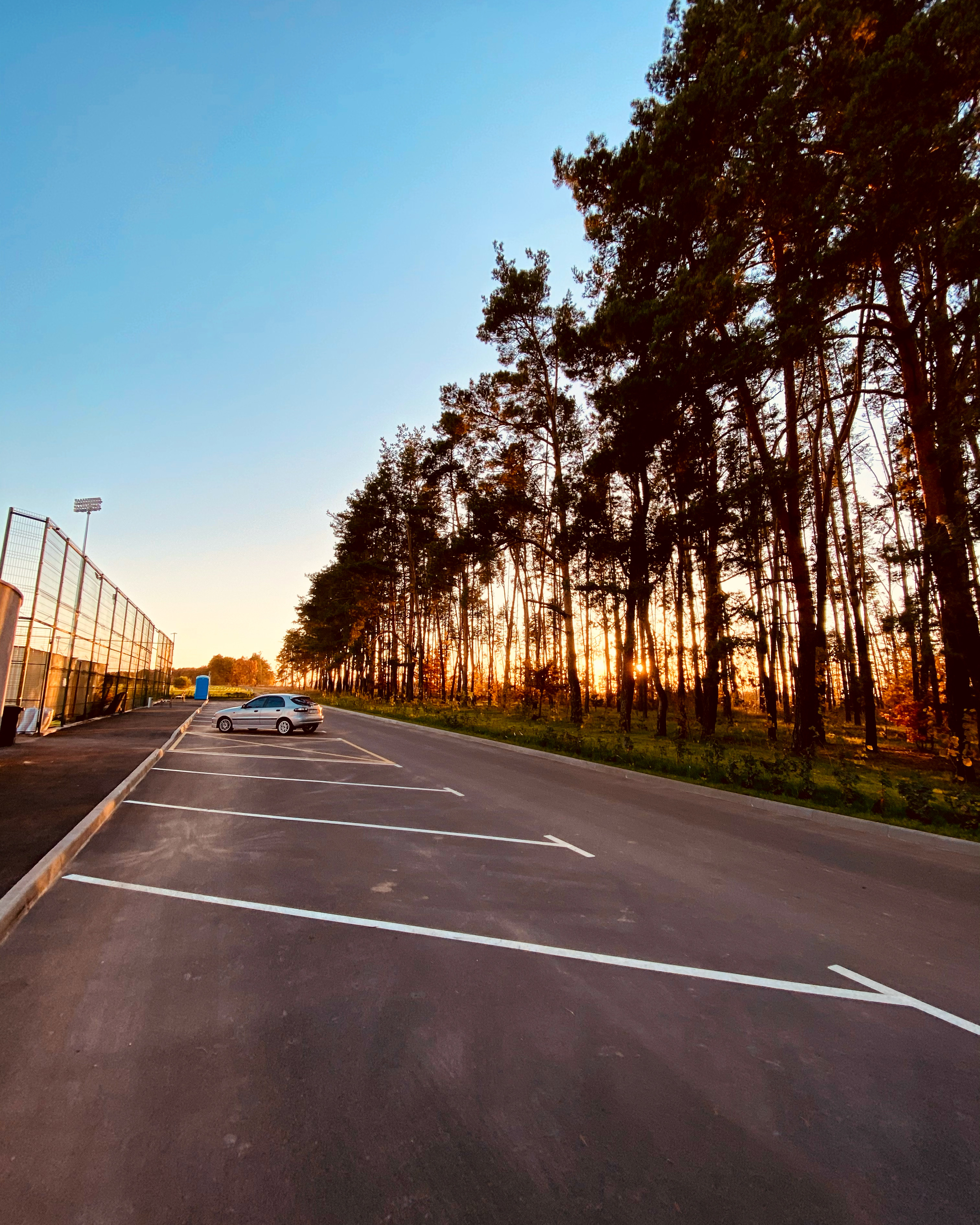

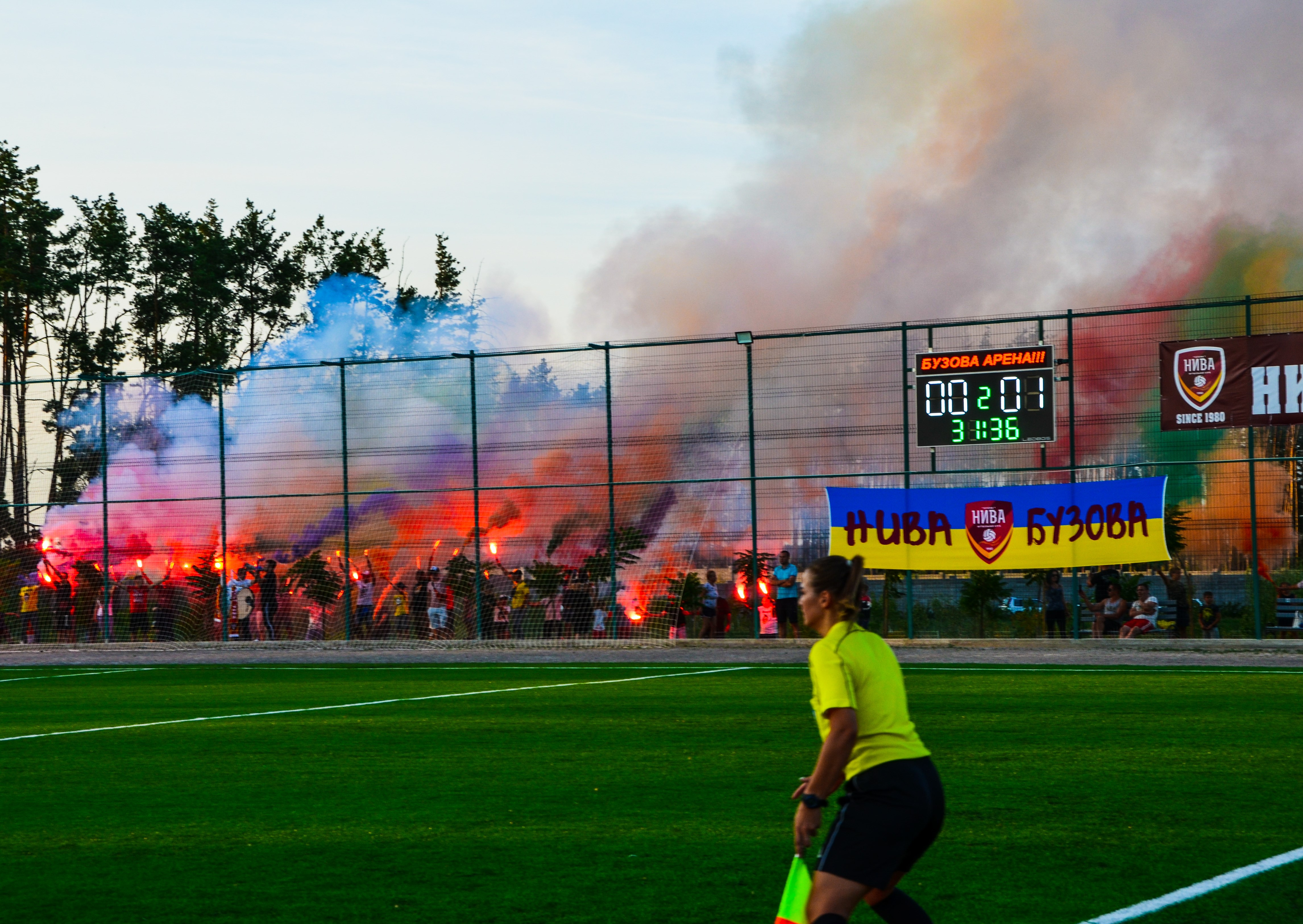

== See also ==
- Buzova
- Nyva Buzova
- FC Kudrivka
- FC Lisne
