= 2020 Football Championship of Kyiv Oblast =

Football Championship of Kyiv Oblast
- Season: 2019
- Champions: Kudrivka Irpin; 1st title

The 2020 Football Championship of Kyiv Oblast was won by Kudrivka Irpin.

== League table ==
Pos	Team	Pld	W	D	L	GF	GA	GD	Pts	Qualification or relegation
1	Kudrivka Irpin (C)	22	15	4	3	46	18	+28	34	Champions
2	Dzhuniors Shpytky	22	13	6	3	52	17	+35	32	
3	Denhoff Denykhivka	22	14	2	6	70	27	+43	30	
4	Desna Pogreby	22	12	5	5	45	26	+19	29	
5	Kolos Pustovarivka	22	12	1	9	56	32	+24	25	
6	Mezhyhiria Novi Petrivtsi	22	11	4	7	47	27	+20	26	
7	Sokil Mykhailivka-Rubezhivka	22	7	7	8	34	29	+5	21	
8	Askania-Flora Kalynivka	22	8	3	11	32	51	−19	19	
9	Sofia Sofiivska Borshchahivka	22	7	3	12	34	52	−18	17	
10	Iunior Makariv	22	5	2	15	33	75	−42	12	
11	Dynamo Fastiv	22	3	5	14	21	49	−28	11	
12	Berkut-Lehion Brovary	22	3	2	17	22	89	−67	8	

Source: "Фінішував ювілейний, уже 85-й чемпіонат Київщини". KOFF. 14 November 2020. Archived from the original on 2020-11-24.
(C) Champions
