= 2021 Football Championship of Kyiv Oblast =

Football Championship of Kyiv Oblast
- Season: 2021
- Champions: Nyva Buzova; 1st title

The 2021 Football Championship of Kyiv Oblast was won by Nyva Buzova.

== League table ==
Pos	Team	Pld	W	D	L	GF	GA	GD	Pts	Qualification or relegation
1	Nyva Buzova (C)	22	18	3	1	61	10	+51	57	Champions
2	Denhoff Denykhivka	22	17	2	3	70	24	+46	53	
3	Dzhuniors Shpytky	22	16	4	2	69	19	+50	52	
4	Druzhba Myrivka	22	15	3	4	56	20	+36	48	
5	Kudrivka Irpin	22	10	6	6	32	27	+5	36	
6	Kolos Pustovarivka	22	8	6	8	30	27	+3	30	
7	Kalynivka	22	7	5	10	36	44	−8	26	
8	Sokil Mykhailivka-Rubezhivka	22	6	6	10	31	42	−11	24	
9	Ronin Lisne	22	6	5	11	28	33	−5	23	
10	Iunior Makariv	22	7	1	14	24	61	−37	22	
11	Sofia Sofiivska Borshchahivka	22	4	7	11	24	41	−17	19	
12	Mezhyhiria Novi Petrivtsi	22	5	4	13	28	51	−23	19	
13	Dynamo Fastiv	22	4	2	16	19	66	−47	14	
14	Horodok 1998 Vasylkiv	22	3	2	17	21	64	−43	11	

(C) Champions
