= Andriy Zasukha =

Ukrainian businessman

- Андрій Засуха
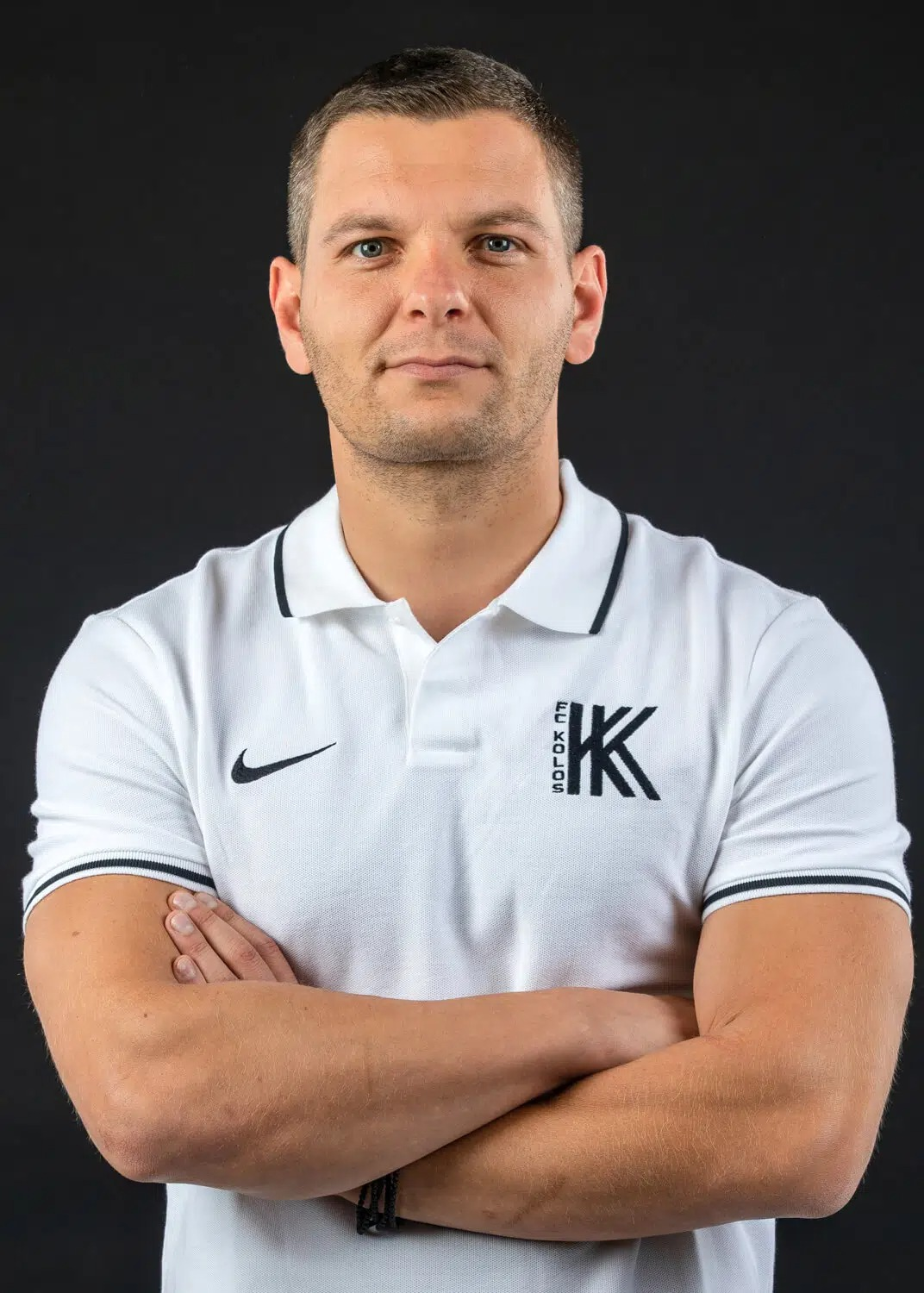
- Born: 30 October 1986 (age 40); Kovalivka, Kyiv Oblast, Ukrainian SSR
- Occupation: businessman

Andriy Anatoliyovych Zasukha (Ukrainian: Андрій Анатолійович Засуха, born 30 October 1986) is a Ukrainian businessman and former footballer. He became notable of creating a football club in a small village of Central Ukraine, taking it to the Ukrainian Premier League and qualifying for the European football clubs competitions.

== Biography ==
Andriy is the son of the Ukrainian family of politicians Zasukhas: his father Anatoliy Zasukha and mother Tetiana Zasukha. In 2012, Andriy Zasukha received a diploma from the Moscow State Institute of International Relations (MGIMO).

In 2012, Andriy Zasukha became the president of FC Kolos Kovalivka.

In 2020, in a small village near Bila Tserkva, Zasukha built a new stadium, transforming it from a rural open field into a stadium that can accommodate 5,000 spectators, while the population of Kovalivka is around 1,500 residents.

Since 2020 Andriy Zasukha is a president of the Kyiv Oblast Football Federation replacing Yaroslav Moskalenko.
