= FC Lehioner Dnipro =

Ukrainian football club

Lehioner Dnipro
- Full name: FC Lehioner Dnipro
- Founded: November 2017
- Ground: Olimpiyski Rezervy Stadium, Dnipro
- Capacity: 300
- Chairman: Yana Nyarko
- Manager: Bright John Nyarko
- League: Ukrainian Football Amateur League
- 2021–22: 8th of 9 in Group 3
Home colours	Away colours

FC Lehioner Dnipro (Ukrainian: Футбольний клуб «Легіонер») was a Ukrainian football club from the city of Dnipro. The team played in the Ukrainian Amateur championship.

== History ==
Club was formed by a Ghanaian student Bright John Nyarko and his Ukrainian wife Yana in November 2017 in Dnipro. She became club's chairman and he became manager. A month later club was playing in Dnipropetrovsk Oblast championship. In 2019 they made debut in Amateur championship, where they played for three years.

In early 2022 twenty-nine out of thirty-two players at the club were foreign players. They included players from Ghana, Nigeria, Senegal, Côte d'Ivoire, Burkina-Faso, Angola, Tunis, Algeria, Morocco, Egypt, Japan and Ukraine.
