= 2019 Football Championship of Kyiv Oblast =

Football Championship of Kyiv Oblast
- Season: 2019
- Champions: Avanhard Bziv; 3rd title

The 2019 Football Championship of Kyiv Oblast was won by Avanhard Bziv.

== League table ==
Pos	Team	Pld	W	D	L	GF	GA	GD	Pts
1	Avanhard Bziv (C)	24	16	5	3	59	19	+40	37
2	Dzhuniors Shpytky	24	15	4	5	44	24	+20	34
3	Kudrivka Irpin	24	14	3	7	70	41	+29	31
4	Sokil Mykhailivka-Rubezhivka	24	13	3	8	45	29	+16	29
5	Desna Pohreby	24	11	7	6	45	33	+12	29
6	Mezhyhiria Novi Petrivtsi	24	11	5	8	36	31	+5	27
7	Patriot Baryshivka Raion	24	10	7	7	48	41	+7	27
8	Askania-Flora Kalynivka	24	11	4	9	33	31	+2	26
9	Meliorator Bucha	24	10	2	12	34	46	−12	22
10	Berkut-Lehion Brovary	24	7	4	13	32	60	−28	18
11	Denhoff Denykhivka	24	6	4	14	44	57	−13	16
12	Liubomyr Stavyshche	24	3	4	17	30	53	−23	10
13	Dinaz-2 Vyshhorod	24	3	0	21	27	82	−55	6

Source: "Чемпіонат Київської області 2019". Footboom. Archived from the original on 2020-06-18.
(C) Champions
