= 1981 KFK competitions (Ukraine) =

KFK competitions
- Season: 1981

The 1981 KFK competitions in Ukraine were part of the 1981 Soviet KFK competitions that were conducted in the Soviet Union. It was 17th season of the KFK in Ukraine since its introduction in 1964. The winner eventually qualified to the 1982 Soviet Second League.

== First stage ==
=== Group 1 ===
Pos	Team	Pld	W	D	L	GF	GA	GD	Pts
1	Nyva Pidhaitsi	22	17	5	0	58	9	+49	39
2	Naftovyk Dolyna	22	13	5	4	46	24	+22	31
3	Sokil Lviv	22	12	7	3	47	18	+29	31
4	Khimik Sokal	22	10	7	5	35	29	+6	27
5	Druzhba Zbarazh	22	12	2	8	31	19	+12	26
6	Urozhai Kolchyne	22	11	4	7	37	24	+13	26
7	Meteor Chernivtsi	22	7	6	9	37	38	−1	20
8	Intehral Vinnytsia	22	6	7	9	22	22	0	19
9	Elektron Ivano-Frankivsk	22	5	8	9	19	32	−13	18
10	Budivelnyk Kuznetsovsk	22	6	3	13	20	42	−22	15
11	Podillia Khmelnytskyi	22	2	3	17	17	61	−44	7
12	Spetstekhobl Novovolynsk	22	1	3	18	12	63	−51	5

Source: ukr-football.org.ua

=== Group 2 ===
Pos	Team	Pld	W	D	L	GF	GA	GD	Pts
1	Zorya Khorostkiv	22	16	5	1	60	20	+40	37
2	Khimik Drohobych	22	12	6	4	41	19	+22	30
3	Silmash Kovel	22	12	6	4	28	10	+18	30
4	Khimik Kalush	22	10	4	8	24	29	−5	24
5	Kooperator Khust	22	9	5	8	35	39	−4	23
6	Haisyn	22	9	5	8	23	27	−4	23
7	Zorya Velyka Kernytsia	22	8	5	9	31	29	+2	21
8	Karpaty Bushtyna	22	7	6	9	40	39	+1	20
9	Elektrovymiriuvach Zhytomyr	22	7	3	12	20	30	−10	17
10	Kombainobudivnyk Ternopil	22	7	3	12	30	39	−9	17
11	Mayak Sarny	22	5	2	15	15	40	−25	12
12	Karpaty Kuty	22	3	4	15	18	44	−26	10

Source: ukr-football.org.ua

=== Group 3 ===
Pos	Team	Pld	W	D	L	GF	GA	GD	Pts
1	Refryzherator Fastiv	20	11	8	1	43	13	+30	30
2	Bilshovyk Kyiv	20	10	7	3	36	18	+18	27
3	Mashynobudivnyk Borodianka	20	10	5	5	23	20	+3	25
4	Prohres Nizhyn	20	9	7	4	25	14	+11	25
5	Budivelnyk Prypiat	20	9	7	4	21	18	+3	25
6	Lokomotyv Poltava	20	9	6	5	32	17	+15	24
7	Olimpiyets Kyiv	20	8	5	7	22	20	+2	21
8	Okean Mykolaiv	20	5	6	9	21	20	+1	16
9	Shakhtar Oleksandriya	20	4	6	10	21	36	−15	14
10	Lokomotyv Znamianka	20	4	4	12	13	28	−15	12
11	Tsukrovyk Horodyshche	20	0	1	19	11	64	−53	1

Source: ukr-football.org.ua

=== Group 4 ===
Pos	Team	Pld	W	D	L	GF	GA	GD	Pts
1	Mayak Kharkiv	22	14	6	2	37	17	+20	34
2	Shakhtar Dzerzhynsk	22	10	7	5	24	15	+9	27
3	Radyst Kirovohrad	22	10	7	5	23	13	+10	27
4	Kolos Osokorivka	22	9	8	5	27	21	+6	26
5	Frehat Pervomaisk	22	10	5	7	34	27	+7	25
6	Avanhard Derhachi	22	7	8	7	27	26	+1	22
7	Mashynobudivnyk Smila	22	7	7	8	27	26	+1	21
8	Metalurh Kupiansk	22	7	6	9	13	13	0	20
9	Avtomobilist Zaporizhia	22	6	8	8	20	25	−5	20
10	Naftovyk Kremenchuk	22	5	6	11	17	28	−11	16
11	Lokomotyv Kyiv	22	5	4	13	20	38	−18	14
12	Krystal Yahotyn	22	2	8	12	13	33	−20	12

Source: ukr-football.org.ua

=== Group 5 ===
Pos	Team	Pld	W	D	L	GF	GA	GD	Pts
1	Enerhiya Nova Kakhovka	22	19	2	1	59	8	+51	40
2	Tytan Armyansk	22	13	6	3	52	22	+30	32
3	Meteor Simferopol	22	12	5	5	54	21	+33	29
4	ZKL Dnipropetrovsk	22	11	5	6	30	20	+10	27
5	Transformator Zaporizhia	22	8	7	7	30	32	−2	23
6	Enerhiya Kurakhove	22	8	5	9	18	45	−27	21
7	Sudnoremontnyk Illichivsk	22	6	7	9	21	27	−6	19
8	Chornomorets Yalta	22	5	9	8	22	30	−8	19
9	Kolos Skadovsk	22	6	5	11	31	38	−7	17
10	Avanhard Dzhankoy	22	4	7	11	44	53	−9	15
11	Shakhtar Ukrayinsk	22	4	3	15	21	51	−30	11
12	Suvorovets Izmayil	22	2	7	13	18	53	−35	11

Source: ukr-football.org.ua

=== Group 6 ===
Pos	Team	Pld	W	D	L	GF	GA	GD	Pts
1	Sokil Rovenky	22	14	6	2	36	12	+24	34
2	Shakhtobudivnyk Donetsk	22	13	6	3	27	15	+12	32
3	Shakhtar Krasnyi Luch	22	12	2	8	36	25	+11	26
4	Shakhtar Sverdlovsk	22	11	3	8	34	28	+6	25
5	Tekstylnyk Donetsk	22	11	2	9	28	21	+7	24
6	Kirovets Makiivka	22	10	4	8	35	22	+13	24
7	Khimik Rubizhne	22	10	4	8	39	34	+5	24
8	Azovkabel Berdiansk	22	8	4	10	29	28	+1	20
9	Budivelnyk Pervomaisk	22	8	4	10	25	29	−4	20
10	Komunarets Komunarsk	22	6	3	13	24	36	−12	15
11	Avanhard Lozova	22	5	2	15	18	37	−19	12
12	Avanhard Kryvyi Rih	22	2	4	16	17	61	−44	8

Source: ukr-football.org.ua
