= FC Desna Pohreby =

Professional football club based in Ukraine

Football Club Desna Pohreby
- Full name: Футбольний клуб «Десна» Погреби
- Founded: 2006
- Ground: Pohreby, Soborna Street, Obukhiv Raion, Kyiv
- League: Kyiv Oblast Championship
- 2020: Kyiv Oblast Championship, 4th of 12

Football Club Desna Pohreby (Ukrainian: ФК "Десна" Погреби) is a Ukrainian football club based in Pohreby, Brovary District, Kyiv Region, founded in 2006. Performs in the Kyiv Oblast Football Federation and Kyiv Region Cup.

== History ==
The club was founded in 2006 in Pohreby, Brovary District, Kyiv Region, founded in 2006. Performs in the Kyiv Oblast Football Federation and Kyiv Region Cup. In 2016 he got into the final of the Kyiv Oblast Football Federation. In 2019, the team got 5th place in the Kyiv Oblast Football Federation.

== Honours ==
Kyiv Oblast Football Federation:

- Second Place 2016
- Third Place 2017

Kyiv Region Cup: 2017

== See also ==
- FC Desna Chernihiv
- FC Desna-2 Chernihiv
- FC Desna-3 Chernihiv
