= 2018–19 Ukrainian Amateur Cup =

2018–19 Ukrainian Cup for amateur teams
Tournament details
- Country: Ukraine
- Dates: 22 August 2018 –
- Teams: 38 (42 planned, 4 withdrew)

Final positions
- Champions: Avanhard Bziv
- Runners-up: FC Vovchansk
- Ukrainian Cup: FC Vovchansk; Avanhard Bziv

Tournament statistics
- Matches played: 72
- Goals scored: 213 (2.96 per match)
- Attendance: 24,568 (341 per match)
- All statistics correct as of 8 June 2019.

The 2018–19 Ukrainian Amateur Cup was the 23rd season of the national football cup competition for amateur teams, which was scheduled to start on August 22, 2018.

The cup holders FC LNZ-Lebedyn were defeated by FC Dnipro in the quarterfinals.

== Participated clubs ==
In bold are clubs that were active at the same season AAFU championship (parallel round-robin competition).

- Cherkasy Oblast: **LNZ-Lebedyn**
- Chernihiv Oblast (3): **Avanhard Koryukivka**, Chernihiv, Fortuna Komarivka
- Dnipropetrovsk Oblast (3): **FC Dnipro**, **Peremoha Dnipro**, **VPK-Ahro Shevchenkivka**
- Donetsk Oblast (2): Forum-Avto Kramatorsk, Sapfir Kramatorsk
- Ivano-Frankivsk Oblast (3): **Karpaty Halych**, Naftovyk Dolyna, **Pokuttia Kolomyia**
- Kharkiv Oblast (2): Univer-Dynamo Kharkiv, Vovchansk
- Kherson Oblast (3): Chornyanka-Ahrosport, **Kolos Askania-Nova**, **Tavriya Novotroitske**
- Kirovohrad Oblast: UkrAhroKom Holovkivka
- Kyiv Oblast (5): Atlet Kyiv, **Avanhard Bziv**, DH Shevchenkivske Denykhivka, Dzhuniors Shpytky, **Rubikon-Vyshneve**
- Luhansk Oblast: Skif Shulhynka
- Lviv Oblast (4): Demnya, Mykolaiv, **Rochyn Sosnivka**, Yunist Verkhnya Bilka
- Poltava Oblast: Olimpia Savyntsi
- Rivne Oblast (3): Izotop-RAES Varash, Mayak Sarny, **ODEK Orzhiv**
- Sumy Oblast (2): Veleten Hlukhiv, **Viktoriya Mykolaivka**
- Ternopil Oblast (2): DSO-Podillya, Zbruch-Ahrobiznes Pidvolochysk
- Vinnytsia Oblast (2): **Fakel Lypovets**, Svitanok-Ahrosvit Shliakhova
- Volyn Oblast (2): LSTM 536 Lutsk, Votrans Lutsk
- Zakarpattia Oblast (2): Sevlyush Vynohradiv, Vilkhivtsi

== Bracket ==
The following is the bracket that demonstrates the last four rounds of the Ukrainian Cup, including the final match. Numbers in parentheses next to the match score represent the results of a penalty shoot-out.

Round of 16
Rochyn Sosnivka	1	0	1
Yunist Verkhnya Bilka	1	1	2
Votrans Lutsk	0	1	1
SCC Demnya	3	4	7
ODEK Orzhiv	0	1	1
Avanhard Bziv	1	1	2
Fortuna Komarivka	-
Fakel Lypovets	+
DH Shevchenkivske Denykhivka	1	2	3
Avanhard Koryukivka	2	2	4
FC Vovchansk	3	1	4
Olympiya Savyntsi	1	1	2
Univer-Dynamo Kharkiv	1	1	2
FC Dnipro	1	4	5
Tavriya Novotroitske	2	1	3
LNZ-Lebedyn	0	6	6

Quarter-finals
Yunist Verkhnya Bilka	1	0	1
SCC Demnya (a)	1	0	1
Fakel Lypovets	1	-	-
Avanhard Bziv	5	+	+
Avanhard Koryukivka	0	0	0
FC Vovchansk	1	4	5
FC Dnipro	2	2	4
LNZ-Lebedyn	2	1	3

Semi-finals
SCC Demnya	1	0	1
Avanhard Bziv	1	2	3
FC Vovchansk (p)	1	0	1 (5)
FC Dnipro	0	1	1 (4)

Final
Avanhard Bziv	1	0	1
FC Vovchansk	0	0	0

== Competition schedule ==
=== Preliminary round ===
First games will be played on 22 August and seconds on 29 August.

Team 1	Agg.	Team 2	1st leg	2nd leg
FC Naftovyk Dolyna	4–0	SC Vilkhivtsi	1–0	3–0
FC Svitanok-Ahrosvit Shlyakhova	4–3	FC Atlet Kyiv	3–2	1–1
FC Dzhuniors-SB	2–4	FC Fortuna Komarivka	2–2 (Note: played at Miskyi Stadium, Vyshneve)	0–2 (Note: played at Spartak Stadium, Nizhyn)
FC Chornyanka-Ahrosport	1–2	FC UkrAhroKom Holovkivka	0–1	1–1 (a.e.t.)
FC Vovchansk	10–1	FC Forum-Avto Kramatorsk	3–0	7–1

First games will be played on 22 August and seconds on 5 September.

Team 1	Agg.	Team 2	1st leg	2nd leg
FC Zbruch-Ahrobiznes Pidvolochysk	w/o (Note: no technical score was awarded)	FC Mykolaiv	–	–

First games will be played on 29 August and seconds on 5 September.

Team 1	Agg.	Team 2	1st leg	2nd leg
FC Yunist Verkhnya Bilka	7–4	FC Lutsksantekhmontazh 536 Lutsk	4–2	3–2 (Note: played at Stadium, Knyahynynok)
FC Izotop-RAES Varash	w/o	FC Votrans Lutsk	–	–
FC Veleten Hlukhiv	?–?	FC Olimpiya Savyntsi	?–?	?–?
FC Univer-Dynamo Kharkiv	6–2	FC Skif Shulhynka	6–2	0–0 (Note: played at Kolos Stadium, Starobilsk)

Twenty two other teams will join 10 winners of the preliminary round.

=== Round of 32 ===
First games will be played on 12 September and seconds on 19 September. The draw results were announced on 6 September 2018.

Team 1	Agg.	Team 2	1st leg	2nd leg
FC Sevlyush Vynohradiv	1–4	FC Rochyn Sosnivka	1–0	0–4
FC Karpaty Halych	1–5	FC Yunist Verkhnya Bilka	0–1	1–4
FC Votrans Lutsk	4–4 (5–4 p)	FC Pokuttia Kolomyia	3–1 (Note: played at Votrans Arena, Pidhaitsi)	1–3
FC Naftovyk Dolyna	1–3	SCC Demnya	1–0	0–3 (Note: played at Miskyi Stadium, Mykolaiv)
FC Zbruch-Ahrobiznes Pidvolochysk	1–5	FC ODEK Orzhiv	1–4	0–1
FC Avanhard Bziv	1–0	FC Mayak Sarny	1–0 (Note: played at Knyazha Arena, Shchaslyve)	0–0
FC DSO-Podillya	2–3	FC Fakel Lypovets	2–2 (Note: played at Ternopilskyi Miskyi Stadium, Ternopil)	0–1
FC Rubikon-Vyshneve	0–2	FC Fortuna Komarivka	0–2	0–0
FC DH Shevchenkivske Denykhivka	4–3	FC Chernihiv	3–1	1–2
Avanhard Koryukivka	5–4	FC Svitanok-Ahrosvit Shlyakhova	2–2	3–2
FC Olympiya Savyntsi	2–1	FC VPK-Ahro Shevchenkivka	0–1 (Note: played at Start Stadium, Myrhorod)	2–0 (a.e.t.)
FC Viktoriya Mykolaivka	2–5	FC Vovchansk	2–1	0–4
FC Univer-Dynamo Kharkiv	7–2	FC Peremoha Dnipro	4–1	3–1 (Note: played at Molodizhnyi Park Stadium)
FC Sapfir Kramatorsk	3–4	FC Dnipro	2–2	1–2
FC LNZ-Lebedyn	w/o	FC Kolos Askania-Nova	–	–
FC Tavriya Novotroitske	9–2	FC UkrAhroKom Holovkivka	3–1	6–1

=== Round of 16 ===
First games will be played on 3 October and seconds on 10 October.

Team 1	Agg.	Team 2	1st leg	2nd leg
FC Rochyn Sosnivka	1–2	FC Yunist Verkhnya Bilka	1–1	0–1 (Note: played at Markevych Stadium, Vynnyky)
FC Votrans Lutsk	1–7	SCC Demnya	0–3	1–4
FC ODEK Orzhiv	1–2	FC Avanhard Bziv	0–1	1–1 (Note: played at Prohres Stadium, Baryshivka)
FC Fortuna Komarivka	w/o	FC Fakel Lypovets	3–0	–
FC DH Shevchenkivske Denykhivka	3–4	FC Avanhard Koryukivka	1–2	2–2
FC Vovchansk	4–2	FC Olympiya Savyntsi	3–1	1–1
FC Univer-Dynamo Kharkiv	2–5	FC Dnipro	1–1	1–4 (Note: played at Metalurh Stadium, Novomoskovsk)
FC Tavriya Novotroitske	3–6	FC LNZ-Lebedyn	2–0	1–6

=== Quarterfinals ===
First games will be played on 24 October and seconds on 31 October.

Team 1	Agg.	Team 2	1st leg	2nd leg
FC Yunist Verkhnya Bilka	1–1 (a)	SCC Demnya	1–1	0–0
FC Fakel Lypovets	w/o (Note: legs were reversed)	FC Avanhard Bziv	1–5	–
Avanhard Koryukivka	0–5	FC Vovchansk	0–1	0–4
FC Dnipro	4–3	FC LNZ-Lebedyn	2–2	2–1

=== Semifinals ===
First games will be played on 24 April 2019 and seconds on 1 May 2019.

Team 1	Agg.	Team 2	1st leg	2nd leg
SCC Demnya	1–3	FC Avanhard Bziv	1–1	0–2
FC Vovchansk	1–1 (5–4 p)	FC Dnipro	1–0	0–1

=== Final ===
First games will be played on 18 May 2019 and seconds on 8 June 2019.

Team 1	Agg.	Team 2	1st leg	2nd leg
FC Avanhard Bziv	1–0	FC Vovchansk	1–0	0–0

Winner of the 2018–19 Ukrainian Football Cup among amateur teams
Avanhard Bziv (Kyiv Oblast); 1st time

== See also ==
- 2018–19 Ukrainian Football Amateur League
- 2018–19 Ukrainian Cup
