= Buzova, Kyiv Oblast =

Rural locality in Kyiv Oblast, Ukraine

Coordinates: 50°25′N 30°02′E

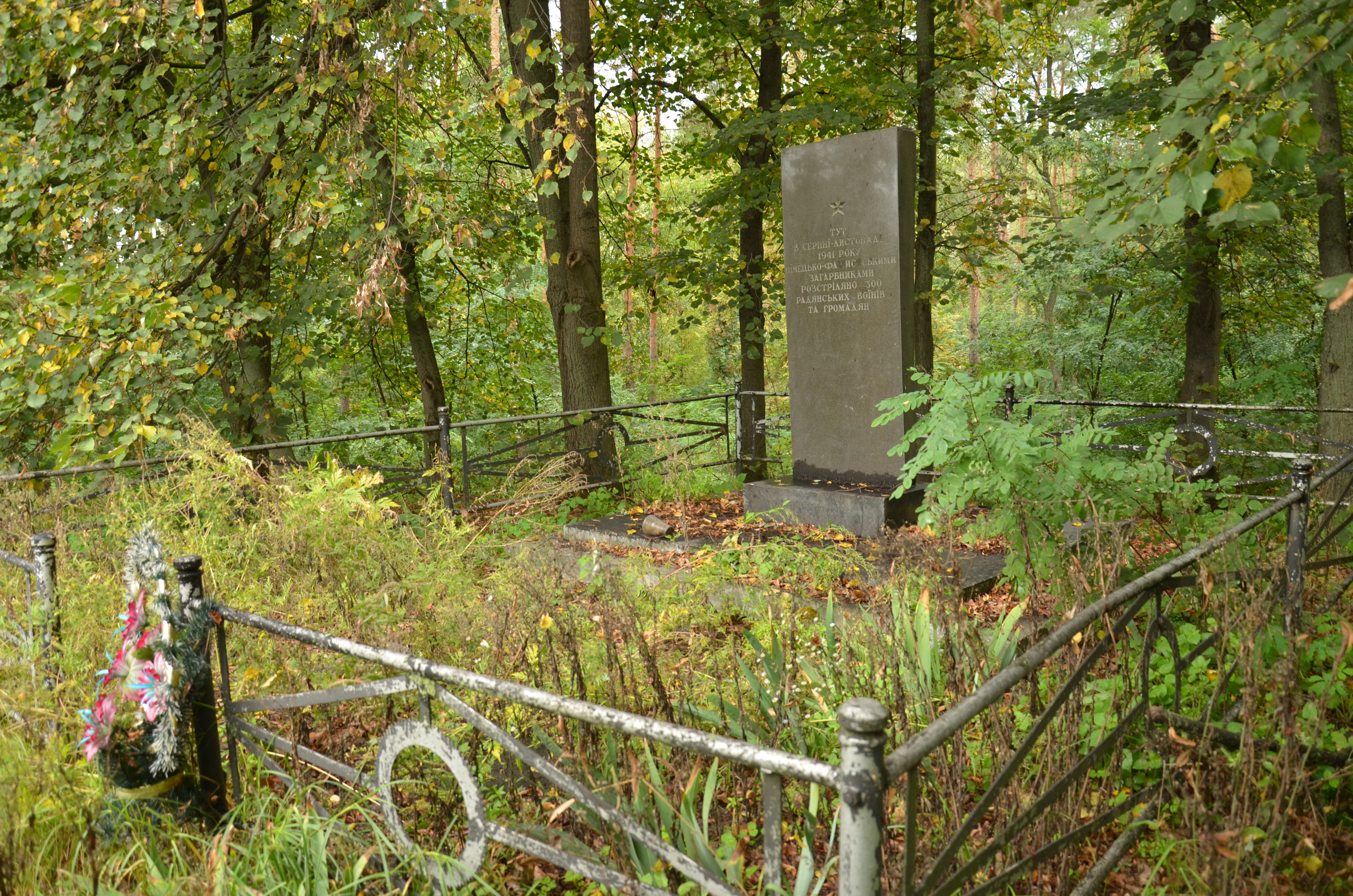
Memorial monument to warriors of the Soviet Army and local civilians who were killed by "fascists" in August–November 1941

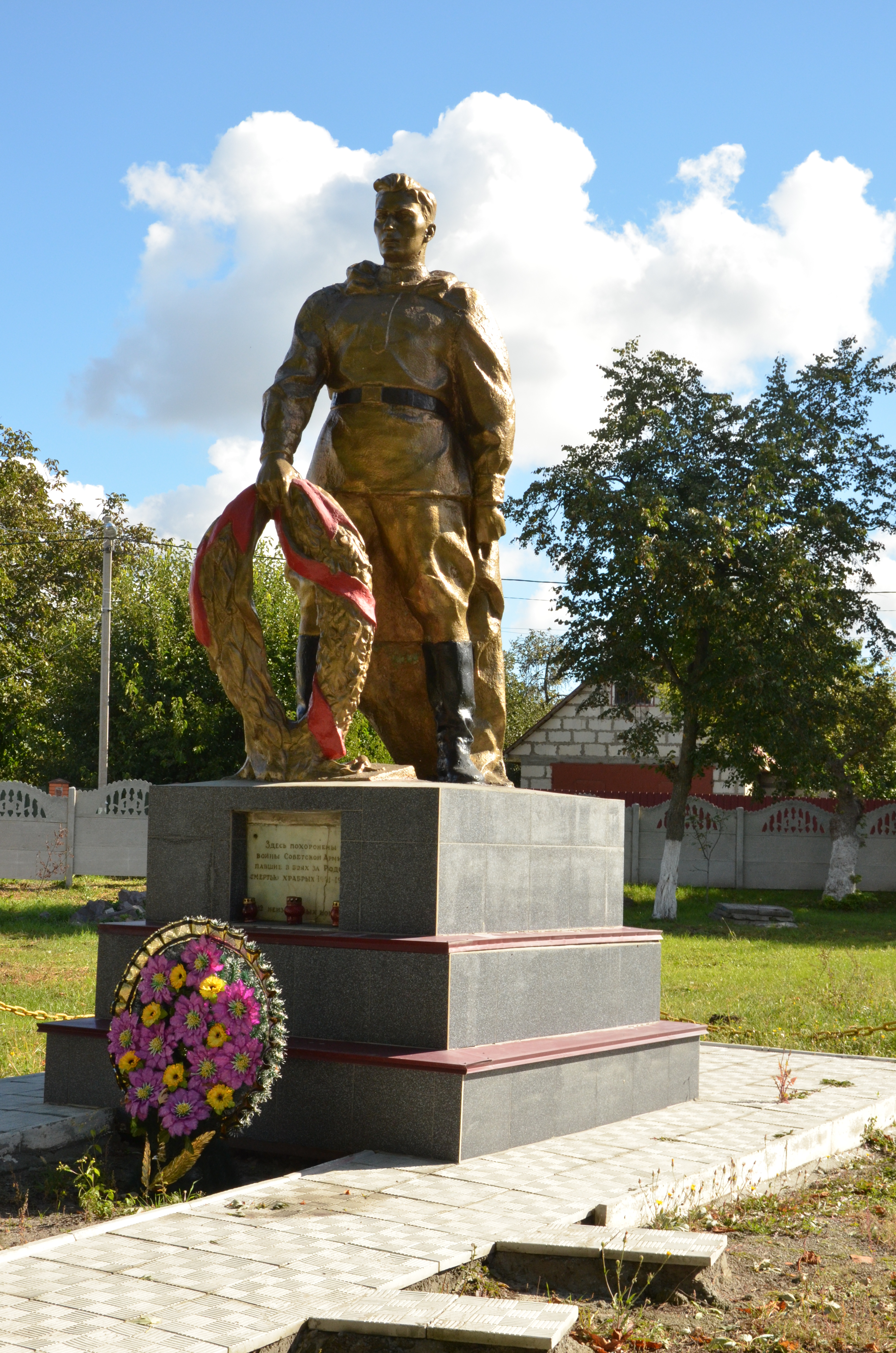
Monument to warriors, Buzova village natives

Buzova (Ukrainian: Бузова) is a village in Ukraine, in Bucha Raion (district) of the Kyiv Oblast. It belongs to Dmytrivka rural hromada, one of the hromadas of Ukraine. The village has a population of 1,548. The M06 highway runs past it.

== History ==
Until 18 July 2020, Buzova belonged to Kyiv-Sviatoshyn Raion. The raion was abolished that day as part of the administrative reform of Ukraine, which reduced the number of raions of Kyiv Oblast to seven. The area of Kyiv-Sviatoshyn Raion was split between Bucha, Fastiv, and Obukhiv Raions, with Buzova being transferred to Bucha Raion.

=== 2022 Russian invasion of Ukraine ===
During the 2022 Russian invasion of Ukraine, Russian forces attacked the stadium and fought over the recreational airstrip just outside the village. It was reported on 1 March 2022 that shelling hit the Adonis private maternity hospital beside the highway, and that there had been heavy fighting in the area for several days prior. It was later reported that a mass grave of civilians killed by Russian forces was found in the village.
