= Kyiv Oblast Football Association =

Football governing body in Ukraine

Kyiv Oblast Football Association (KOFA) is a football governing body in the region of Kyiv Oblast, Ukraine. The association is a collective member of the Ukrainian Association of Football.

As part of the Union-wide reorganization of the Soviet football when there were established numerous regional associations, the organization has been formed in fall of 1964.

== Heads of the organization ==
- 1989–1997 Viktor Melnyk
- 1997–1998 Mykola Kirsanov
- 1998–2012 Oleksandr Tyutyun
- 2012–2016 Anatolii Prysiazhniuk
- 2016–2017 Maksym Melnychuk
- 2017–2020 Yaroslav Moskalenko
- 2020–present Andriy Zasukha

== Previous Champions ==
- 1946 FC Vasylkiv
- 1947 ????
- 1948 ????
- 1949 DO Cherkasy
- 1950 Kharchovyk Smila
- 1951 Kharchovyk Smila (2)
- 1952 Kharchovyk Smila (3)
- 1953 Torpedo Fastiv
- 1954 Boryspil Raion team
- 1955 Torpedo Fastiv (2)
- 1956 Spartak Kahanovychi Pershi
- 1957 Avanhard Fastiv
- 1958 Urozhai Boryspil
- 1959 Avanhard Fastiv (2)
- 1960 Spartak Bila Tserkva
- 1961 Spartak Bila Tserkva (2)
- 1962 Spartak Bila Tserkva (3)
- 1963 Temp Bila Tserkva
- 1964 Spartak Bila Tserkva (4)
- 1965 Zoria Vasylkiv
- 1966 Spartak Bila Tserkva (5)
- 1967 Silmash Bila Tserkva
- 1968 Avtomobilist Bila Tserkva
- 1969 Kholodylnyk Vasylkiv
- 1970 Kholodylnyk Vasylkiv (2)
- 1971 FC Irpin
- 1972 Budivelnyk Brovary
- 1973 Budivelnyk Brovary (2)
- 1974 Spartak Bila Tserkva (6)
- 1975 Refryzherator Fastiv
- 1976 Refryzherator Fastiv (2)
- 1977 Refryzherator Fastiv (3)
- 1978 Refryzherator Fastiv (4)
- 1979 Rubin Piskivka
- 1980 Mashynobudivnyk Borodianka
- 1981 Budivelnyk Pripyat
- 1982 Budivelnyk Pripyat (2)
- 1983 Budivelnyk Pripyat (3)
- 1984 Silmash Bila Tserkva (2)
- 1985 Mashynobudivnyk Borodianka (2)
- 1986 Refryzherator Fastiv (5)
- 1987 Mashynobudivnyk Borodianka (3)
- 1988 Nyva Myronivka
- 1989 Blyskavka Baryshivka
- 1990 Refryzherator Fastiv (6)
- 1991 Prometei Boyarka
- =independence of Ukraine=
- 1992 Nyva Myronivka (2)
- 1993 Refryzherator Fastiv (7)
- 1994 Saturn Irpin
- 1995 Kolos Karapyshi (3)
- 1996 Refryzherator Fastiv (8)
- 1997 Refryzherator Fastiv (9)
- 1998 UFEI Irpin
- 1999(s) Refryzherator Fastiv (10)
- 1999(f) Sokil Velyka Dymerka
- 2000 Kartonnyk Obukhiv
- 2001 Podatkova Akademia Irpin (2)
- 2002 FC Bucha
- 2003 Dnipro Obukhiv
- 2004 Dnipro Obukhiv (2)
- 2005 Hran Buzova
- 2006 Arsenal Bila Tserkva
- 2007 FC Putrivka
- 2008 FC Putrivka (2)
- 2009 Inter Fursy
- 2010 FC Putrivka (3)
- 2011 Dinaz Vyshhorod
- 2012 Kolos Kovalivka
- 2013 Kolos Kovalivka (2)
- =Russo-Ukrainian War=
- 2014 Kolos Kovalivka (3)
- 2015 Chaika Petropavlivska-Borshchahivka
- 2016 Dzhuniors Shpytky
- 2017 Avanhard Bziv
- 2018 Avanhard Bziv (2)
- 2019 Avanhard Bziv (3)
- 2020 Kudrivka Irpin
- 2021 Nyva Buzova (1)
- =full-scale Russian invasion=
- 2022-23 Druzhba Myrivka (1)
- 2023-24 Shturn Ivankiv (1)

=== Winners ===
- 10 - Refryzherator Fastiv
- 6 - Spartak Bila Tserkva
- 3 - 7 clubs (Budivelnyk Pr., Mashynobudivnyk, FC Nyva M. (Kolos Ka.), Putrivka, Kolos Ko., Avanhard B., Kharchovyk)
- 2 - 7 clubs (Podatkova Akademia (UFEI), Dnipro O., Budivelnyk Br., Kholodylnyk, Silmash, Avanhard F., Torpedo)
- 1 - 26 clubs
- 2 seasons - unknown winners
- 4 times competitions were won by teams from Cherkasy Oblast created in 1954

== Cup winners ==
- 2004 FC Hran Buzova
- 2005 FC Dinaz Vyshhorod
- 2006 FC Arsenal Bila Tserkva
- 2007 FC Irpin Horenychi
- 2008 FC Irpin Horenychi
- 2009 FC Inter Fursy
- 2010 FC Bucha
- 2011 FC Bucha
- 2012 FC Dinaz Vyshhorod
- 2013 FC Chaika Petropavlivska-Borshchahivka
- 2014 FC Kolos Kovalivka
- 2015 FC Dinaz Vyshhorod
- 2016 FC Sokil Mykhailivka-Rubezhivka
- 2017 FC Desna Pohreby

== Professional clubs ==
locations of all professional clubs and "teams of maters"
- FC Ros Bila Tserkva (Ryhonda, Dynamo Irpin), 1984-2011 (28 seasons)
  - FC Transimpeks Vyshneve, 1994–1995 (a season) --> Skhid Slavutych

- FC Nyva Myronivka (Nyva-Borysfen), 1992-1996 (5 seasons)
- FC Systema-Boreks Borodianka, 1993-2005 (12 seasons) --> FC Inter Boyarka
- FC Inter Boyarka, 2005-2007 (2 seasons)
- FC Slavutych (Nerafa, Skhid), 1995-1998 (3 seasons)
- FC Borysfen Boryspil, 1997-2007 (10 seasons)
  - FC Borysfen-2 Boryspil, 2001-2004 (3 seasons)
- FC Nafkom Brovary (Naftovyk Irpin), 2001-2009 (8 seasons)
- FC Knyazha Shchaslyve, 2005-2009 (4 seasons)
  - FC Knyazha-2 Shchaslyve, 2008/09 (a season)
- FC Arsenal Bila Tserkva, 2007-2018 (11 seasons)
- FC Kolos Kovalivka, 2015– (10 seasons)
  - Kolos-2 Kovalivka, 2024- (a season)
- SC Chaika Petropavlivska Borshchahivka, 2018– (7 seasons)
- FC Dinaz Vyshhorod, 2019– (6 seasons)
- FC Lyubomyr Stavyshche, 2021–2022 (a season)
- FC Nyva Buzova, 2022–2024 (2 seasons)
- FC Druzhba Myrivka, 2023–2024 (a season)

== Other clubs at national/republican level ==
Note: the list includes clubs that played at republican competitions before 1959 and the amateur or KFK competitions after 1964. In parentheses are teams that, since 1954 (creation of Cherkasy Oblast), play in the neighboring region.

- (Uman, 1937, 1938)
- (Smila, 1938)
- (Pershyi Cherkaskyi, 1947)
- (Mashynobudivnyk Smila, 1948, 1949)
- (DO Cherkasy, 1948, 1949)
- Mashynobudivnyk Fastiv, 1948, 1949
- Trud Vasylkiv, 1948
- v/c Bila Tserkva, 1948
- Urozhai Boryspil, 1949
- Spartak Bila Tserkva, 1952, 1954–1956, 1958, 1959, 1964
- Torpedo Fastiv, 1953, 1957
- Avtotraktordetal Bila Tserkva, 1965
- Lokomotyv Fastiv, 1966, 1982
- Avtomobilist Bila Tserkva, 1967, 1969, 1970
- Avanhard Bila Tserkva, 1968
- FC Irpin, 1971, 1972
- Refryzherator Fastiv, 1974 – 1981, 1987 – 1989, 1991, 1997/98 – 1999
- Shynnyk Bila Tserkva, 1976
- Kolos Borodianka, 1977
- Budivelnyk Borodianka, 1978
- Rubin Piskivka, 1978 – 1980
- Krystal Yahotyn, 1979 – 1981
- Hart Borodianka (Mashynobudivnyk), 1981, 1983, 1984, 1986, 1988 – 1992/93
- Slavutych (Budivelnyk Prypiat), 1981 – 1985, 1987, 1988, 1994/95, 1998/99
- Dynamo Irpin, 1983
- Silmash Bila Tserkva, 1985
- Zoria Obukhiv, 1987
- Nyva Myronivka, 1989 – 1991, 1996/97
- Ahro-Blyskavka Baryshivka, 1990, 1991, 1993/94
- Fakel Fastiv, 1990
- Budivelnyk Ivankiv, 1991, 1992/93
- Promin Bila Tserkva, 1991
- Budivelnyk Brovary, 1993/94 – 1996/97
- Transimpeks Vyshneve, 1993/94
- Katekh Irpin, 1994/95
- UFEI Irpin, 1997/98 – 2000
- Dinaz Vyshhorod, 2000, 2011, 2018/19
- KLO Bucha, 2003
- Hran Buzova, 2006
- Antares Obukhiv, 2007
- Arsenal Bila Tserkva, 2007
- Zenit Boyarka, 2008, 2009
- Irpin Horenychi, 2009
- FC Putrivka, 2011
- FC Volodarka, 2012
- LKT Slavutych, 2013
- Kolos Kovalivka, 2014, 2015
- Chaika Petropavlivska-Borshchahivka, 2016 – 2017/18
- Chaika Vyshhorod, 2018/19
- Avanhard Bziv, 2018/19
- FC Bila Tserkva, 2019/20 – 2021/22
- Liubomyr Stavyshche, 2020/21
- Nyva Buzova, 2021/22
- Druzhba Myrivka, 2022/23
- Shturm Ivankiv, 2022/23, 2023/24
- Sokil Mykhailivka-Rubezhivka, 2023/24, 2024/25
- FC Lisne, 2024/25
- Mriya Hostomel, 2024/25

== Notable footballers ==
=== Soviet Union national football team ===
- Volodymyr Onyshchenko

=== Ukraine national football team ===
- Andriy Shevchenko
- Bohdan Mykhaylichenko
- Ruslan Bidnenko
- Rustam Khudzhamov

== See also ==
- Regional football associations of Ukraine
- Football Association of Kyiv
