= FC Avanhard Bziv =

Avangard
- Full name: FC Avangard Bziv
- Founded: 2015
- Ground: Progres Stadium, Baryshivka
- Chairman: (Ukraine) Andriy Korotkov
- Head coach: (Ukraine) Serhiy Karpenko

FC Avangard Bziv (Ukrainian: Футбольний клуб «Авангард» (Бзів)) is an amateur Ukrainian football from Bziv, Brovary Raion.

== History ==
The club was created in 2015.

== Notable Player ==
- (Ukraine) Andriy Smalko
- (Ukraine) Petro Kondratyuk
- (Ukraine) Oleksiy Pospyelov

== Honours ==
- Ukrainian Amateur Cup
  - Winners (1): 2018–19
- Kyiv Oblast Championship
  - Winners (2): 2017, 2018
- Kyiv Oblast Cup
  - Runners-up (1): 2017
