= 2022–23 Ukrainian First League =

Ukrainian First League
- Season: 2022–23
- Dates: 27 August – 27 November 2022 (first stage); 8 April – 14 May 2023 (second stage)
- Champions: Polissya Zhytomyr
- Promoted: Polissya Zhytomyr; Obolon Kyiv; LNZ Cherkasy
- Relegated: Skoruk Tomakivka (withdrew)
- Matches: 152
- Goals: 369 (2.43 per match)
- Top goalscorer: Pylyp Budkivskyi (14 goals)
- Biggest home win: Kremin 7–0 Hirnyk-Sport (18 September 2022)
- Biggest away win: Dinaz 0–5 Polissya (1 October 2022)
- Highest scoring: Kremin 7–0 Hirnyk-Sport (18 September 2022); Kremin 4–3 Poltava (11 November 2022); Prykarpattia 6–1 Hirnyk-Sport (6 May 2023)
- Longest winning run: Polissia (10 games)
- Longest unbeaten run: Polissia (14 games)
- Longest winless run: Mariupol (13 games)
- Longest losing run: Mariupol (5 games)
- Total attendance: 0
- Average attendance: 0
- All statistics correct as of 8 May 2023.

The 2022–23 Ukrainian First League was the 32nd since its establishment. The league competition consisted of 16 teams. The competition took place during the ongoing war with the Russia since late February 2022. It was decided to conduct competitions in two groups.

== Format ==
Due to the Russo-Ukrainian War, the league competitions changed its usual format. The Professional Football League of Ukraine (PFL) Conference adopted changes to the 2022–23 season after some 24 PFL teams were forced to suspend their activities or dissolve. It was decided to keep the same number of participants at 16 but split them in two groups of 8. Previously the split group competition in the second tier were only conducted once back in 1992.

The competitions are scheduled to consist of two stages. At the first stage two groups of 8 would conduct a usual double round-robin tournament. At the second stage, the top four from each group form the promotion group, while the bottom four from each group – the relegation group. Points earned at the first stage will be kept for the second, while teams would only be playing with participants of the group. So, in total each team is expected to play 22 games. The top two teams of the promotion group receive direct promotion to the Ukrainian Premier League (UPL), while the 3rd and the 4th would play promotion relegation play-off with the 14th and the 13th teams of UPL, respectfully. In case if Desna and Mariupol would decide to return, play-off games will be canceled and the UPL will be expanded. The bottom team of the relegation group will be relegated directly, while the second to the last will contest its place in the second tier with the 2022–23 Ukrainian Second League runner-up.

== Teams ==
This season, Ukrainian First League consisted of 16 teams.

=== Promoted teams ===
Ten teams have been promoted from the 2021–22 Ukrainian Second League. While originally it had been expected that MFA Mukachevo would be promoted, in less than a month it was confirmed that the club will not participate in the season. Later along with VPK-Ahro, it was replaced with Bukovyna and Chernihiv.

- Karpaty Lviv – first place in Group A (returning after 17 seasons, last competed in the 2005–06)
- LNZ Cherkasy – second place in Group A (debut)
- Dinaz Vyshhorod – fourth place in Group A (debut)
- Epitsentr Dunaivtsi – fifth place in Group A (debut)
- Bukovyna Chernivtsi – ninth place in Group A (returning after 5 seasons)
- Chernihiv – tenth place in Group A (debut)
- Metalurh Zaporizhzhia – first place in Group B (returning after 2 seasons, last competed in the 2019–20)
- Skoruk Tomakivka – second place in Group B (debut)
- Poltava – sixth place in Group B (debut)
- Mariupol – eleventh place in Group B (debut)

=== Relegated teams ===
Eight clubs withdrew from the league due to the Russian aggression.

=== Renamed teams ===
- FSC Mariupol is a successor of Yarud Mariupol.
- Epitsentr Kamianets-Podilskyi has officially moved from Dunaivtsi to Kamianets-Podilskyi.
- FC Chernihiv-ShVSM is a successor of FC Chernihiv by merging with the local School of Higher Sports Mastery, hence the acronym.

=== Location map ===
The following displays the location of teams. Group A teams marked in red. Group B teams marked in green.

Home venues of teams in the 2022–23 Ukrainian First League.

== Stadiums ==
The following stadiums were used as home grounds for the teams in the competition.

Rank	Stadium	Location	Capacity	Club	Notes
1	Ukraina Stadium	Lviv	27,925	Karpaty Lviv	
2	Ternopil City Stadium	Ternopil	15,150	Nyva Ternopil	
3	Bukovyna Stadium	Chernivtsi	12,076	Bukovyna Chernivtsi	
4	Slavutych-Arena	Zaporizhzhia	11,883	Metalurh Zaporizhzhia	
5	Cherkasy Arena	Cherkasy	10,321	LNZ Cherkasy	
6	MCS Rukh	Ivano-Frankivsk	6,500	Prykarpattia Ivano-Frankivsk	
7	Central Stadium	Zhytomyr	5,928	Polissya Zhytomyr	
8	Obolon Arena	Kyiv	5,100	Obolon Kyiv	
9	Lokomotyv Stadium	Poltava	3,700	SC Poltava	
10	Yunist Stadium	Chernihiv	3,000	FC Chernihiv	
11	Tonkocheyev Stadium	Kamianets-Podilskyi	2,587	Epitsentr Kamianets-Podilskyi	
12	Yunist Stadium	Horishni Plavni	2,500	Hirnyk-Sport Horishni Plavni	
13	Kolos Stadium	Dunaivtsi	2,500	Epitsentr Kamianets-Podilskyi	used as home ground in Round 2
14	Inhulets Stadium	Petrove	1,869	Kremin Kremenchuk	used as home ground in Round 2
15	Kremin Stadium	Kremenchuk	1,500	Kremin Kremenchuk	
16	Dinaz Stadium	Demydiv	500	Dinaz Vyshhorod FSC Mariupol	used as home ground during the season

== Personnel and sponsorship ==
Team	President	Head coach	Captain	Kit manufacturer	Shirt sponsor
Bukovyna Chernivtsi	Andriy Safronyak	(Ukraine) Andriy Melnychuk	(Ukraine) Vasyl Hakman	Nike	Taistra
Chernihiv	Yuriy Synytsya	(Ukraine) Valeriy Chornyi	(Ukraine) Vitaliy Mentey	Joma	Jako
Dinaz Vyshhorod	Yaroslav Moskalenko	(Ukraine) Oleksandr Holovko	(Ukraine) Denys Petrenko	Nike	—
Epitsentr Kamianets-Podilskyi	Ivan Chernonoh	(Ukraine) Serhiy Nahornyak	(Ukraine) Andriy Bezhenar	Macron	Epitsentr
Hirnyk-Sport Horishni Plavni	Petro Kaplun	(vacant)	(Ukraine) Maksym Tsvirenko	Jako	Ferrexpo
Karpaty Lviv	Stepan Yurchyshyn	(Ukraine) Myron Markevych	(Ukraine) Ambrosiy Chachua	Joma	Lvivske
Kremin Kremenchuk	Serhiy Kovnir	(Ukraine) Roman Loktionov	(Ukraine) Denys Halata	SWIFT	TERMINAL-MK
LNZ Cherkasy	Andriy Poltavets	(Ukraine) Oleksandr Kovpak	(Ukraine) Oleh Tarasenko	Puma	tevitta
Mariupol	Oleksandr Yaroshenko	(Ukraine) Oleh Krasnopyorov	(Ukraine) Ivan Mochevinskyi	Joma	KOD Zdorovia
Metalurh Zaporizhzhia	Maksym Lupashko	(Ukraine) Volodymyr Mykytyn	(Ukraine) Volodymyr Polyovyi	Legea	Weltum
Nyva Ternopil	Oleksandr Stadnyk	(Ukraine) Serhiy Atlasyuk (interim)	(Ukraine) Maksym Mekhaniv	Jako	—
Obolon Kyiv	Oleksandr Slobodian	(Ukraine) Valeriy Ivashchenko	(Ukraine) Nazariy Fedorivskyi	Jako	Favbet
Polissya Zhytomyr	Volodymyr Zahurskyi	(Ukraine) Yuriy Kalitvintsev	(Ukraine) Vladyslav Ohirya	Nike	BGV Group
Poltava	Serhiy Ivashchenko	(Ukraine) Volodymyr Sysenko	(Ukraine) Dmytro Shcherbak	Joma	KVP
Prykarpattia Ivano-Frankivsk	Vasyl Olshanetskyi	(Ukraine) Oleh Rypan	(Ukraine) Vasyl Tsyutsyura	Joma	Morshynska
Skoruk Tomakivka	Maksym Skoruk	(Ukraine) Oleksandr Stepanov	(Ukraine) Artem Perebora	Kelme	—

=== Managerial changes ===
Team	Outgoing head coach	Manner of departure	Date of vacancy	Table	Incoming head coach	Date of appointment
Bukovyna Chernivtsi	(Ukraine) Yuriy Kyslytsia (acting)	End of interim	31 July 2022	Pre-season	(Ukraine) Andriy Melnychuk	31 July 2022
Epitsentr Kamianets-Podilskyi	(Ukraine) Oleh Naduda	Change of role	2 September 2022	3rd	(Ukraine) Serhiy Nahornyak	2 September 2022
LNZ Cherkasy	(Ukraine) Yuriy Bakalov	Dismissed	6 September 2022	5th	(Ukraine) Oleksandr Kovpak (acting)	6 September 2022
Nyva Ternopil	(Ukraine) Andriy Kuptsov	Resigned	14 September 2022	6th	(Ukraine) Serhiy Zadorozhnyi (acting)	14 September 2022
LNZ Cherkasy	(Ukraine) Oleksandr Kovpak (acting)	Change of role	2 December 2022	1st	(Ukraine) Oleksandr Kovpak	2 December 2022
Hirnyk-Sport	(Ukraine) Ihor Zhabchenko	End of contract	25 December 2022	16th	(Ukraine) Serhiy Diryavka	30 January 2023
Nyva Ternopil	(Ukraine) Serhiy Zadorozhnyi	Change of role	20 April 2023	7th	(Ukraine) Serhii Atlasiuk (acting)	20 April 2023
Hirnyk-Sport Horishni Plavni	(Ukraine) Serhiy Diryavka	Fired	30 May 2023	16th	(Ukraine) Valeriy Kutsenko	19 June 2023
Karpaty Lviv	(Ukraine) Andriy Tlumak	Resigned	1 June 2023	5th	(Ukraine) Myron Markevych	1 June 2023

== Group A league table ==
Pos	Team	Pld	W	D	L	GF	GA	GD	Pts	Promotion, qualification or relegation
1	Polissya Zhytomyr	14	13	1	0	34	6	+28	40	Qualified to the Promotion group
2	Karpaty Lviv	14	9	1	4	22	13	+9	28	Qualified to the Promotion group
3	Epitsentr Kamianets-Podilskyi	14	8	3	3	17	11	+6	27	Qualified to the Promotion group
4	Nyva Ternopil	14	5	5	4	15	8	+7	20	Qualified to the Promotion group
5	Prykarpattia Ivano-Frankivsk	14	4	3	7	11	22	−11	15	Qualified to the Relegation group
6	Dinaz Vyshhorod	14	2	4	8	14	28	−14	10	Qualified to the Relegation group
7	Bukovyna Chernivtsi	14	2	3	9	9	21	−12	9	Qualified to the Relegation group
8	Mariupol	14	1	4	9	12	25	−13	7	Qualified to the Relegation group

Source: PFL.ua
Rules for classification: 1) Points; 2) Head-to-head points; 3) Head-to-head goal difference; 4) Head-to-head goals scored; 5) Goal difference in all games; 6) Goals scored in all games (Note: calculation by criteria indicated in rules 2, 3, 4 is conducted with consideration of all teams that have an equal number of tournament points at the moment of calculation and not only among those which after preliminary criteria have appeared more successful).

=== Results ===
Home \ Away	BUK	DIN	EPC	KAR	MAR	NYV	PZH	PRY
Bukovyna Chernivtsi		0–0	1–2	1–2	3–1	0–3	1–2	0–1
Dinaz Vyshhorod	1–1		1–3	1–2	1–4	1–1	0–5	2–2
Epitsentr Kamianets-Podilskyi	0–0	3–2		1–0	1–0	1–1	1–2	2–0
Karpaty Lviv	4–0	3–2	0–2		3–0	1–0	1–2	2–1
FSC Mariupol	0–1	0–2	0–1	1–1		0–2	0–2	1–1
Nyva Ternopil	1–0	1–0	0–0	0–1	1–1		0–0	4–0
Polissia Zhytomyr	2–0	3–0	3–0	2–0	4–2	2–1		2–0
Prykarpattia Ivano-Frankivsk	2–1	0–1	1–0	0–2	2–2	1–0	0–3	

Source: Calendar (in Ukrainian)
Legend: Blue = home team win; Yellow = draw; Red = away team win.

=== Group A goalscorers ===
As of 27 November 2022

Rank	Scorer	Team	Goals (Pen.)
1	(Ukraine) Pylyp Budkivskyi	Polissia Zhytomyr	11 (0)
2	(Ukraine) Maksym Hirnyi	Epitsentr Kamianets-Podilskyi	7 (3)
3	(Ukraine) Bohdan Kushnirenko	Polissia Zhytomyr	6 (1)
4	(Ukraine) Rostyslav Taranukha	Karpaty Lviv	5 (0)
4	(Ukraine) Vasyl Palahnyuk	Bukovyna Chernivtsi	5 (3)
6	4 players		4
10	5 players		3
15	12 players		2
27	40 players		1

=== Clean sheets ===
As of 27 November 2022

Rank	Player	Club	Clean sheets
1	(Ukraine) Oleh Kudryk	Polissia Zhytomyr	8
2	(Ukraine) Maksym Mekhaniv	Nyva Ternopil	7
3	(Ukraine) Serhiy Chernobay	Epitsentr Kamianets-Podilskyi	5
3	(Ukraine) Roman Lyopka	Karpaty Lviv	5
5	2 players		3
7	1 players		2
8	5 players		1

== Group B league table ==
Pos	Team	Pld	W	D	L	GF	GA	GD	Pts	Promotion, qualification or relegation
1	LNZ Cherkasy	14	9	3	2	22	6	+16	30	Qualified to the Promotion group
2	Obolon Kyiv	14	9	2	3	20	9	+11	29	Qualified to the Promotion group
3	Kremin Kremenchuk	14	6	3	5	28	24	+4	21	Qualified to the Promotion group
4	Metalurh Zaporizhzhia	14	5	5	4	17	16	+1	20	Qualified to the Promotion group
5	Chernihiv	14	4	4	6	13	17	−4	16	Qualified to the Relegation group
6	Poltava	14	4	3	7	15	19	−4	15	Qualified to the Relegation group
7	Skoruk Tomakivka	14	3	5	6	15	22	−7	14	Qualified to the Relegation group
8	Hirnyk-Sport Horishni Plavni	14	1	5	8	8	25	−17	8	Qualified to the Relegation group

Source: PFL.ua
Rules for classification: 1) Points; 2) Head-to-head points; 3) Head-to-head goal difference; 4) Head-to-head goals scored; 5) Goal difference in all games; 6) Goals scored in all games (Note: calculation by criteria indicated in rules 2, 3, 4 is conducted with consideration of all teams that have an equal number of tournament points at the moment of calculation and not only among those which after preliminary criteria have appeared more successful).

=== Results ===
Home \ Away	CHE	HIS	KRE	LNZ	MET	OBL	POL	SKO
Chernihiv		2–1	0–2	0–2	0–0	0–1	0–1	1–1
Hirnyk-Sport Horishni Plavni	0–2 (Note: Round 2 match between Hirnyk-Sport vs Chernihiv was postponed on several occasions due to rocket attacks from the Russian Federation and finally took place on November 24)		1–2	0–1	1–1	2–0	1–1	1–1
Kremin Kremenchuk	3–0	7–0		1–1	0–4 (Note: postponed)	0–3	4–3	3–1
LNZ Cherkasy	2–2	5–0	2–0		1–0	0–0	1–0	3–0
Metalurh Zaporizhzhia	0–2	1–0	3–3	2–1		1–2	1–1	1–0
Obolon Kyiv	3–1	0–0	1–0	1–0	3–0		2–1	3–1
Poltava	1–1	1–0 (Note: Match between Poltava vs Hirnyk-Sport was postponed since no permission was granted from local military administrations to conduct those events.)	2–0	0–1	1–2	2–1		1–3
Skoruk Tomakivka	0–2	1–1	3–3	0–2	1–1 (Note: Match between Skoruk vs Metalurh was postponed due to security concerns over the increased number of missile strikes on Zaporizhia.)	1–0	2–0	

Source: Calendar (in Ukrainian)
Legend: Blue = home team win; Yellow = draw; Red = away team win.

=== Group B goalscorers ===
As of 27 November 2022

Rank	Scorer	Team	Goals (Pen.)
1	(Ukraine) Denys Halata	Kremin Kremenchuk	9 (1)
2	(Ukraine) Ivan Tyshchenko	LNZ Cherkasy	7 (0)
3	(Ukraine) Oleksandr Batalskyi	Obolon Kyiv	6 (1)
3	(Ukraine) Oleksandr Mishurenko	Skoruk Tomakivka	6 (1)
3	(Ukraine) Oleksiy Sydorov	Metalurh Zaporizhzhia	6 (1)
6	1 player		5
7	3 players		4
10	7 players		3
17	13 players		2
30	36 players		1

=== Hat-tricks ===
Player	For	Against	Result	Date
(Ukraine) Denys Halata	Kremin Kremenchuk	Chernihiv	3–0	27 November 2022

Away win
Home win
Draw

=== Clean sheets ===
As of 27 November 2022

Rank	Player	Club	Clean sheets
1	(Ukraine) Kirill Samoylenko	LNZ Cherkasy	9
2	(Ukraine) Nazariy Fedorivskyi	Obolon Kyiv	7
3	(Ukraine) Nazar Baida	Metalurh Zaporizhzhia	4
3	(Ukraine) Oleksandr Shyray	Chernihiv	4
3	(Ukraine) Yan Vichnyi	SC Poltava	4
6	2 players		2
8	5 players		1

== Promotion group league table ==
Pos	Team	Pld	W	D	L	GF	GA	GD	Pts	Promotion, qualification or relegation
1	Polissya Zhytomyr (P)	14	10	2	2	25	9	+16	32	Promotion to Ukrainian Premier League
2	Obolon Kyiv (P)	14	8	5	1	19	8	+11	29	Promotion to Ukrainian Premier League
3	LNZ Cherkasy (O, P)	14	6	4	4	19	12	+7	22	Qualification to promotion play-offs
4	Metalurh Zaporizhzhia	14	6	3	5	18	16	+2	21	Qualification to promotion play-offs
5	Karpaty Lviv	14	5	3	6	12	16	−4	18	
6	Epitsentr Kamianets-Podilskyi	14	4	3	7	12	17	−5	15	
7	Nyva Ternopil	14	0	8	6	10	17	−7	8	
8	Kremin Kremenchuk	14	1	4	9	11	31	−20	7	

Source: PFL.ua
Rules for classification: 1) Points; 2) Head-to-head points; 3) Head-to-head goal difference; 4) Head-to-head goals scored; 5) Goal difference in all games; 6) Goals scored in all games (Note: calculation by criteria indicated in rules 2, 3, 4 is conducted with consideration of all teams that have an equal number of tournament points at the moment of calculation and not only among those which after preliminary criteria have appeared more successful).
(O) Play-off winners; (P) Promoted

=== Results ===
Home \ Away	EPC	KAR	KRE	LNZ	MET	NVT	OBL	PZH
Epitsentr Kamianets-Podilskyi			3–1	0–2	1–2		0–0	
Karpaty Lviv			2–0	1–1	0–1		1–1	
Kremin Kremenchuk	1–2	1–1				2–2		0–2
LNZ Cherkasy	2–0	4–1				1–1		1–2
Metalurh Zaporizhzhia	1–0	0–1				1–1		0–1
Nyva Ternopil			0–2	1–2	1–1		1–2	
Obolon Kyiv	2–1	1–2				1–1		1–1
Polissia Zhytomyr			5–0	2–1	1–2		0–1	

Source: Calendar (in Ukrainian)
Legend: Blue = home team win; Yellow = draw; Red = away team win.

=== Promotion group goalscorers ===
As of 29 May 2023

Rank	Scorer	Team	Goals (Pen.)
1	Pylyp Budkivskyi	Polissia Zhytomyr	14 (0)
2	Denys Halata	Kremin Kremenchuk	11 (1)
2	Ivan Tyshchenko	LNZ Cherkasy	11 (2)
2	Oleksiy Sydorov	Metalurh Zaporizhzhia	11 (3)
5	Maksym Hirnyi	Epitsentr Kamianets-Podilskyi	8 (3)
5	Vasyl Hrytsuk	Polissia Zhytomyr	8 (8)
7	Bohdan Kushnirenko	Polissia Zhytomyr	7 (1)
8	Vitaliy Hrusha	Obolon Kyiv	6 (0)
8	Rostyslav Taranukha	Karpaty Lviv	6 (0)
8	Oleksandr Batalskyi	Obolon Kyiv	6 (1)
11	1 players		5
12	6 players		4
18	13 players		3
31	13 players		2
46	57 players		1

=== Clean sheets ===
As of 29 May 2023

Rank	Player	Club	Clean sheets
1	Kirill Samoylenko	LNZ Cherkasy	11
2	Oleh Kudryk	Polissia Zhytomyr	10
3	Nazariy Fedorivskyi	Obolon Kyiv	9
4	Maksym Mekhaniv	Nyva Ternopil	7
5	Nazar Baida	Metalurh Zaporizhia	6
6	2 players		5
8	1 players		3
9	2 players		2
11	4 players		1

== Relegation group league table ==
Pos	Team	Pld	W	D	L	GF	GA	GD	Pts	Promotion, qualification or relegation
9	Prykarpattia Ivano-Frankivsk	14	6	6	2	21	11	+10	24	
10	Skoruk Tomakivka (Note: Skoruk will not participate the next season due to the destruction of the Kakhovka Dam by the Russian occupation forces and depletion of water for agrarian and economical needs in Nikopol Raion.)	14	5	8	1	18	9	+9	23	Suspended its operations for the next season.
11	Bukovyna Chernivtsi	14	5	6	3	18	14	+4	21 (Note: Head-to-head goal difference: Bukovyna +4, Dinaz -1)	
12	Dinaz Vyshhorod	14	5	6	3	16	17	−1	21	
13	Chernihiv	14	5	4	5	15	16	−1	19	
14	Poltava	14	4	4	6	16	22	−6	16	
15	Mariupol	14	3	3	8	18	23	−5	12	Qualification to relegation play-off
16	Hirnyk-Sport Horishni Plavni	14	2	5	7	12	22	−10	11	~~Relegation to Ukrainian Second League~~ canceled

Source: PFL.ua
Rules for classification: 1) Points; 2) Head-to-head points; 3) Head-to-head goal difference; 4) Head-to-head goals scored; 5) Goal difference in all games; 6) Goals scored in all games (Note: calculation by criteria indicated in rules 2, 3, 4 is conducted with consideration of all teams that have an equal number of tournament points at the moment of calculation and not only among those which after preliminary criteria have appeared more successful).
Notes:

Note:

- Relegation was canceled, and both Hirnyk-Sport and Mariupol has been left in the league.

=== Results ===
Home \ Away	BUK	CHE	DIN	HIS	MAR	POL	PRY	SKO
Bukovyna Chernivtsi		3–1		3–2		2–2		1–1
FC Chernihiv	1–1		2–1		2–1		0–2	
Dinaz Vyshhorod		1–0		1–0		2–2		1–1
Hirnyk-Sport Horishni Plavni	1–0		1–1		1–0		1–1	
FSC Mariupol		1–1		2–1		2–4		0–3
SC Poltava	1–2		1–2		0–4		0–1	
Prykarpattia Ivano-Frankivsk		2–0		6–1		0–1		1–1
Skoruk Tomakivka	0–0		3–0		1–0		0–0	

Source: Calendar (in Ukrainian)
Legend: Blue = home team win; Yellow = draw; Red = away team win.

=== Relegation group goalscorers ===
As of 29 May 2023

Rank	Scorer	Team	Goals (Pen.)
1	Ihor Bykovskyi	Mariupol	8 (1)
1	Vasyl Palahnyuk	Bukovyna Chernivtsi	8 (3)
3	Yevhen Streltsov	SC Poltava	7 (0)
3	Vasyl Tsyutsyura	Prykarpattia Ivano-Frankivsk	7 (2)
5	3 players		6
8	1 player		5
9	7 players		4
16	9 players		3
25	13 players		2
38	38 players		1

=== Clean sheets ===
As of 29 May 2023

Rank	Player	Club	Clean sheets
1	Ihor Vartsaba	Skoruk Tomakivka	6
2	3 players		5
5	2 players		3
7	2 players		2
9	8 players		1

== Relegation play-offs ==
The relegation–promotion play-off games are scheduled to take place between the 7th placed team in the Relegation group of the First League with the second place of the Second League. On 18 May 2023, there took place a draw of the PFL play-offs in two legs format (each team plays at home and away) with games scheduled to take place on June 3 and 10.

Team 1	Agg.	Team 2	1st leg	2nd leg
Khust	2–1	Mariupol	1–1	1–0

=== First leg ===
3 June 2023
14:00 UTC+3

Khust	1–1	Mariupol
Prykhodko 70'; Lutsiv (red card) 48'	Report	Litovchenko (penalty missed) 5'; Mykhaylenko 80'; Chushenko (yellow card) (yellow-red card) 32'

Karpaty Stadium, Khust
Attendance: 0
Referee: Denys Reznikov (Kamianske)

=== Second leg ===
9 June 2023
14:00 UTC+3

Mariupol	0–1	Khust
	Report	Merdyeyev 53'

Kolos Stadium, Boryspil
Attendance: 0
Referee: Serhiy Zadyran (Kyiv Oblast)

Khust won 2–1 on aggregate and was promoted to the 2023–24 Ukrainian First League. Mariupol was relegated to the 2023–24 Ukrainian Second League. Mariupol's relegation was reversed following withdrawals of Lviv and Skoruk Tomakivka.

== Awards ==
=== Monthly awards ===
Since 2022 the award is given by PFL together with the website Ukrfootball ("Ukrainian football") switching from another information partner ua-football.com.

Month	Player of the Month		Ref.
Month	Player	Club	Ref.
September 2022	(Ukraine) Oleksandr Batalskyi	Obolon Kyiv	
October 2022	(Ukraine) Oleksandr Mishurenko	Skoruk Tomakivka	
November 2022	(Ukraine) Denys Halata	Kremin Kremenchuk	
April 2023	(Ukraine) Illya Skrypnyk	Bukovyna Chernivtsi	
May 2023	(Ukraine) Vasyl Hrytsuk	Polissia Zhytomyr	

=== Round awards ===
Fall half

Round	Player			Coach		
Round	Player	Club	Reference	Coach	Club	Reference
Round 1	(Ukraine) Oleksiy Sydorov	Metalurh Zaporizhzhia		(Ukraine) Yuriy Kalitvintsev	Polissia Zhytomyr	
Round 2	(Ukraine) Oleksandr Vivdych	Kremin Kremenchuk		(Ukraine) Roman Loktionov	Kremin Kremenchuk	
Round 3	(Ukraine) Pylyp Budkivskyi	Polissia Zhytomyr		(Ukraine) Andriy Tlumak	Karpaty Lviv	
Round 4	(Ukraine) Denys Halata	Kremin Kremenchuk		(Ukraine) Roman Loktionov (2)	Kremin Kremenchuk	
Round 5	(Ukraine) Maksym Hirnyi	Epitsentr Kamianets-Podilskyi		(Ukraine) Serhiy Nahornyak	Epitsentr Kamianets-Podilskyi	
Round 6	(Ukraine) Vasyl Palahnyuk	Bukovyna Chernivtsi		(Ukraine) Valeriy Ivashchenko	Obolon Kyiv	
Round 7	(Ukraine) Oleksandr Mishurenko	Skoruk Tomakivka		(Ukraine) Oleh Rypan	Prykarpattia Ivano-Frankivsk	
Round 8	(Ukraine) Roman Vovk	FC Chernihiv		(Ukraine) Yuriy Kalitvintsev (2)	Polissia Zhytomyr	
Round 9	(Ukraine) Dmytro Makhnyev	Karpaty Lviv		(Ukraine) Volodymyr Sysenko	SC Poltava	
Round 10	(Ukraine) Oleksandr Batalskyi	Obolon Kyiv		(Ukraine) Serhiy Zadorozhnyi	Nyva Ternopil	
Round 11	(Ukraine) Denys Kozhanov	Karpaty Lviv		(Ukraine) Oleksandr Stepanov	Skoruk Tomakivka	
Round 12	(Ukraine) Vladyslav Klymenko	Dinaz Vyshhorod		(Ukraine) Serhiy Nahornyak (2)	Epitsentr Kamianets-Podilskyi	
Round 13	(Ukraine) Anton Savin	LNZ Cherkasy		(Ukraine) Yuriy Kalitvintsev (3)	Polissya Zhytomyr	
Round 14	(Ukraine) Ivan Tyshchenko	LNZ Cherkasy		(Ukraine) Oleh Krasnopyorov	FSC Mariupol	
winter break

Spring half

Round	Player			Coach		
Round	Player	Club	Reference	Coach	Club	Reference
winter break
Round 1	(Ukraine) Oleksiy Sydorov (2)	Metalurh Zaporizhzhia		(Ukraine) Volodymyr Mykytyn	Metalurh Zaporizhzhia	
Round 2	(Ukraine) Dmytro Shcherbak	SC Poltava		(Ukraine) Andriy Melnychuk	Bukovyna Chernivtsi	
Round 3	(Ukraine) Semen Datsenko	Hirnyk-Sport Horishni Plavni		(Ukraine) Valeriy Ivashchenko (2)	Obolon Kyiv	
Round 4	(Ukraine) Bohdan Orynchak	Dinaz Vyshhorod		(Ukraine) Yuriy Kalitvintsev (4)	Polissya Zhytomyr	
Round 5	(Ukraine) Vasyl Tsyutsyura	Prykarpattia Ivano-Frankivsk		(Ukraine) Yuriy Kalitvintsev (5)	Polissya Zhytomyr	
Round 6	(Ukraine) Vitaliy Hrusha	Obolon Kyiv		(Ukraine) Oleh Krasnopyorov (2)	FSC Mariupol	
Round 7	(Ukraine) Artem Perebora	Skoruk Tomakivka		(Ukraine) Oleksandr Kovpak	LNZ Cherkasy	
Round 8	(Ukraine) Stanislav Morarenko	Dinaz Vyshhorod		(Ukraine) Yuriy Kalitvintsev (6)	Polissya Zhytomyr	

== Number of teams by region ==
Number	Region	Team(s)
3	Poltava Oblast	Poltava, Hirnyk-Sport and Kremin
1	Cherkasy Oblast	LNZ
1	Chernihiv Oblast	Chernihiv
1	Chernivtsi Oblast	Bukovyna
1	Dnipropetrovsk Oblast	Skoruk
1	Donetsk Oblast	Mariupol
1	Ivano-Frankivsk Oblast	Prykarpattia
1	Khmelnytskyi Oblast	Epitsentr
1	Kyiv	Obolon
1	Kyiv Oblast	Dinaz
1	Lviv Oblast	Karpaty
1	Ternopil Oblast	Nyva
1	Zaporizhzhia Oblast	Metalurh
1	Zhytomyr Oblast	Polissya

== See also ==
- 2022–23 Ukrainian Premier League
- 2022–23 Ukrainian Second League
- 2022–23 Ukrainian Football Amateur League
