= 2022–23 in Ukrainian football =

Football in Ukraine
- Season: 2022–23

Men's football
- Premier League: Shakhtar Donetsk
- First League: Polissia Zhytomyr
- Second League: Nyva Buzova
- AAFU: Druzhba Myrivka
- Cup / Supercup: not held
- Amateur Cup: Druzhba Myrivka
- UAF Regions' Cup: Ivano-Frankivsk Oblast

Women's football
- Vyshcha Liha: Vorskla Poltava
- Persha Liha: Lider Kobeliaky
- Women's Cup: not held

The 2022–23 in Ukrainian football was the 32nd edition of competitive football in Ukraine since dissolution of the Soviet Union.

Following the Russian invasion of Ukraine and declaration of martial law in the country, the last season was interrupted and it was not certain whether or not next season would take place. Soon after the Russian forces were repelled from the northern Ukraine and Kyiv areas, it was announced that the Ukrainian Association of Football (UAF) would encourage clubs to restart the season. The UAF approved round-robin tournaments in all national league competitions under strict safety precautions, yet it was decided not to carry out competitions of single eliminations.

Usually starting with the season opening match of the Ukrainian Super Cup, the 2022–23 season started on the Ukrainian Flag Day 23 August 2022 with Round 1 games of the Ukrainian Premier League.

Not all competitions resumed. There were cancelled most competitions among youth and children, the main knockout competitions Ukrainian Cup and Ukrainian Super Cup, competitions in some regions (oblasts) were scratched, while selected clubs played in neighboring regions competitions.

== UEFA competitions ==
=== UEFA Champions League ===
==== Qualifying phase and play-off round ====
===== Second qualifying round =====
Team 1	Agg.	Team 2	1st leg	2nd leg
Dynamo Kyiv (Ukraine)	2–1	(Turkey) Fenerbahçe	0–0	2–1 (a.e.t.)

- Due to the Russo-Ukrainian War, Dynamo Kyiv played its home match in Łódź, Poland.

===== Third qualifying round =====
Team 1	Agg.	Team 2	1st leg	2nd leg
Dynamo Kyiv (Ukraine)	3–1	(Austria) Sturm Graz	1–0	2–1 (a.e.t.)

- Due to the Russo-Ukrainian War, Dynamo Kyiv played its home match in Łódź, Poland.

===== Play-off round =====
Team 1	Agg.	Team 2	1st leg	2nd leg
Dynamo Kyiv (Ukraine)	0–5	(Portugal) Benfica	0–2	0–3

- Due to the Russo-Ukrainian War, Dynamo Kyiv played its home match in Łódź, Poland.

==== Group stage ====
===== Group B =====
Pos	Team	Pld	W	D	L	GF	GA	GD	Pts	Qualification	RMA	RBL	SHK	CEL
1	(Spain) Real Madrid	6	4	1	1	15	6	+9	13	Advance to knockout phase	—	2–0	2–1	5–1
2	(Germany) RB Leipzig	6	4	0	2	13	9	+4	12	Advance to knockout phase	3–2	—	1–4	3–1
3	(Ukraine) Shakhtar Donetsk	6	1	3	2	8	10	−2	6	Transfer to Europa League	1–1	0–4	—	1–1
4	(Scotland) Celtic	6	0	2	4	4	15	−11	2		0–3	0–2	1–1	—

Source: UEFA
- Due to the Russo-Ukrainian War, Shakhtar Donetsk played its home matches in Warsaw, Poland.

=== UEFA Europa League ===
==== Qualifying phase and play-off round ====
===== Play-off round =====
Team 1	Agg.	Team 2	1st leg	2nd leg
Dnipro-1 (Ukraine)	1–5	(Cyprus) AEK Larnaca	1–2	0–3

- Due to the Russo-Ukrainian War, Dnipro-1 played its home match in Košice, Slovakia.

==== Group stage ====
===== Group B =====
Pos	Team	Pld	W	D	L	GF	GA	GD	Pts	Qualification	FEN	REN	AEK	DKV
1	(Turkey) Fenerbahçe	6	4	2	0	13	7	+6	14	Advance to round of 16	—	3–3	2–0	2–1
2	(France) Rennes	6	3	3	0	11	8	+3	12	Advance to knockout round play-offs	2–2	—	1–1	2–1
3	(Cyprus) AEK Larnaca	6	1	2	3	7	10	−3	5	Transfer to Europa Conference League	1–2	1–2	—	3–3
4	(Ukraine) Dynamo Kyiv	6	0	1	5	5	11	−6	1		0–2	0–1	0–1	—

Source: UEFA
- Due to the Russo-Ukrainian War, Dynamo Kyiv played its home matches in Kraków, Poland.

==== Knockout phase ====
===== Round of 32 =====
Team 1	Agg.	Team 2	1st leg	2nd leg
Shakhtar Donetsk (Ukraine)	3–3 (5–4 p)	(France) Rennes	2–1	1–2 (a.e.t.)

===== Round of 16 =====
Team 1	Agg.	Team 2	1st leg	2nd leg
Shakhtar Donetsk (Ukraine)	2–8	(Netherlands) Feyenoord	1–1	1–7

=== UEFA Europe Conference League ===
==== Qualifying phase and play-off round ====
===== Second qualifying round =====
Team 1	Agg.	Team 2	1st leg	2nd leg
Vorskla Poltava (Ukraine)	3–4	(Sweden) AIK	3–2	0–2 (a.e.t.)

- Due to the Russo-Ukrainian War, Vorskla Poltava played its home match in Stockholm, Sweden.

===== Third qualifying round =====
Team 1	Agg.	Team 2	1st leg	2nd leg
Zorya Luhansk (Ukraine)	1–3	(Romania) Universitatea Craiova	1–0	0–3

- Due to the Russo-Ukrainian War, Zorya Luhansk played its home match in Lublin, Poland.

==== Group stage ====
===== Group E =====
Pos	Team	Pld	W	D	L	GF	GA	GD	Pts	Qualification	AZ	DNI	APL	VAD
1	(Netherlands) AZ	6	5	0	1	12	6	+6	15	Advance to round of 16	—	2–1	3–2	4–1
2	(Ukraine) Dnipro-1	6	3	1	2	9	7	+2	10	Advance to knockout round play-offs	0–1	—	1–0	2–2
3	(Cyprus) Apollon Limassol	6	2	1	3	5	7	−2	7		1–0	1–3	—	1–0
4	(Liechtenstein) Vaduz	6	0	2	4	5	11	−6	2		1–2	1–2	0–0	—

Source: UEFA
- Due to the Russo-Ukrainian War, Dnipro-1 played its home matches in Košice, Slovakia.

==== Knockout phase ====
===== Knockout round play-offs =====
Team 1	Agg.	Team 2	1st leg	2nd leg
AEK Larnaca (Cyprus)	1–0	(Ukraine) Dnipro-1	1–0	0–0

=== UEFA Women's Champions League ===
==== Qualifying round ====
===== Round 1 =====
====== Semi-finals ======
Team 1	Score	Team 2
Vorskla Poltava (Ukraine)	5–0	(Georgia (country)) Lanchkhuti

====== Final ======
Team 1	Score	Team 2
Vorskla Poltava (Ukraine)	2–0	(Kazakhstan) BIIK Kazygurt

===== Round 2 =====
Team 1	Agg.	Team 2	1st leg	2nd leg
Vorskla Poltava (Ukraine)	2–3	(Albania) Vllaznia Shkodër	1–1	1–2

== Men's club football ==
Due to emergency situation in the country in general, the PFL of Ukraine made some changes to its competitions and league pyramid changing the second tier to multi-group competition and the third tier to single group competition. The second-tier competition last organized in a multi group format following a hiatus the very first championship in 1992.

League		Promoted to league	Omitted from league
Premier League		Metalist Kharkiv; Kryvbas Kryvyi Rih	FC Mariupol; Desna Chernihiv
PFL League 1	Groups		
PFL League 1	A	Karpaty Lviv; Dinaz Vyshhorod; Epitsentr Dunaivtsi; Bukovyna Chernivtsi; FSC Mariupol	Podillia Khmelnytskyi; Volyn Lutsk; Ahrobiznes Volochysk; FC Uzhhorod; Alians Lypova Dolyna; VPK-Ahro Shevchenkivka; FC Kramatorsk; Olimpik Donetsk
PFL League 1	B	LNZ Cherkasy; FC Chernihiv; Metalurh Zaporizhzhia; Skoruk Tomakivka; SC Poltava	Podillia Khmelnytskyi; Volyn Lutsk; Ahrobiznes Volochysk; FC Uzhhorod; Alians Lypova Dolyna; VPK-Ahro Shevchenkivka; FC Kramatorsk; Olimpik Donetsk
PFL League 2	Groups		
PFL League 2	A	Nyva Buzova; Zvyahel Novohrad-Volynskyi; Metalurh-2 Zaporizhia; VAST Mykolaiv; Kremin-2 Kremenchuk; FC Khust	Livyi Bereh Kyiv; MFA Mukachevo; Karpaty Halych; Dnipro Cherkasy; AFSC Kyiv; Lyubomyr Stavyshche
PFL League 2	B	Nyva Buzova; Zvyahel Novohrad-Volynskyi; Metalurh-2 Zaporizhia; VAST Mykolaiv; Kremin-2 Kremenchuk; FC Khust	Peremoha Dnipro; Balkany Zorya; Tavriya Simferopol; FC Trostianets; MFC Mykolaiv; FC Vovchansk; Viktoriya Mykolaivka; FC Nikopol; Enerhiya Nova Kakhovka; Krystal Kherson; FC Sumy

Note: For all scratched clubs, see section Clubs removed for more details

=== Premier League ===
Pos	Team	Pld	W	D	L	GF	GA	GD	Pts	Qualification or relegation
1	Shakhtar Donetsk (C)	30	22	6	2	69	21	+48	72	Qualification for the Champions League group stage
2	Dnipro-1	30	21	4	5	61	27	+34	67	Qualification for the Champions League second qualifying round
3	Zorya Luhansk	30	20	4	6	61	34	+27	64	Qualification for the Europa League play-off round
4	Dynamo Kyiv	30	18	6	6	51	25	+26	60	Qualification for the Europa Conference League third qualifying round
5	Vorskla Poltava	30	13	6	11	38	37	+1	45	Qualification for the Europa Conference League second qualifying round
6	Oleksandriya	30	10	14	6	42	39	+3	44	
7	Kryvbas Kryvyi Rih	30	12	5	13	26	30	−4	41	
8	Mynai	30	9	9	12	25	30	−5	36 (Note: Head-to-head points: Mynai 4, Kolos 1.)	
9	Kolos Kovalivka	30	10	6	14	23	36	−13	36	
10	Chornomorets Odesa	30	9	8	13	35	40	−5	35	
11	Rukh Lviv	30	7	11	12	31	37	−6	32 (Note: Tied on head-to-head points, head-to-head goal difference, head-to-head goals scored.)	
12	Metalist 1925 Kharkiv	30	6	14	10	23	42	−19	32	
13	Veres Rivne (O)	30	8	7	15	35	45	−10	31 (Note: Tied on head-to-head points, head-to-head goal difference, head-to-head goals scored.)	Qualification for the Relegation play-offs
14	Inhulets Petrove (R)	30	8	7	15	22	34	−12	31	Qualification for the Relegation play-offs
15	Metalist Kharkiv (R)	30	5	7	18	27	58	−31	22	Relegation to Ukrainian First League
16	Lviv (R)	30	3	4	23	18	52	−34	13	Suspended its operations for the next season

Source: upl.ua
Rules for classification: 1) Points; 2) Head-to-head points; 3) Head-to-head goal difference; 4) Head-to-head goals scored; 5) Goal difference; 6) Goals scored; 7) Draw or "Golden match" if two teams tied for title (Article 22, paragraph 3).
(C) Champions; (O) Play-off winners; (R) Relegated
Notes:

Teams that placed 13th and 14th in the 2022–23 Ukrainian Premier League play two-leg play-off with the third and fourth teams of the 2022–23 Ukrainian First League. The draw for play-offs took place on 2 June 2023 and the games will be played on 10 and 14 June 2023. If players of the clubs would be called to the national teams, games will be moved to June 8 and 12.

Team 1	Agg.	Team 2	1st leg	2nd leg
Inhulets Petrove	2–3	LNZ Cherkasy	1–1	1–2
Metalurh Zaporizhzhia	2–6	Veres Rivne	1–0	1–6

=== First leg ===
10 June 2023
17:40 UTC+3 (Note: Kick off time was delayed for 40 minutes due to air alert.)

Inhulets Petrove	1 – 1	LNZ Cherkasy
Klymenko 46'	Report	Tyshchenko 57' (pen.)

Inhulets Stadium, Petrove
Attendance: 0
Referee: Vitaliy Romanov (Dnipro)

10 June 2023
17:00 UTC+3

Metalurh Zaporizhzhia	1 – 0	Veres Rivne
Sad 29'	Report	Vovchenko (red card) 5'

Ukraina Stadium, Lviv
Attendance: 0
Referee: Yuriy Ivanov (Donetsk Oblast)

=== Second leg ===
14 June 2023
15:00 UTC+3

LNZ Cherkasy	2 – 1	Inhulets Petrove
Savin 17'; Korobenko 30' (o.g.); Tyshchenko (red card) 90+1'	Report	Sitalo 51'

Cherkasy Arena, Cherkasy
Attendance: 0
Referee: Maksym Kozyryatskyi (Zaporizhia)

LNZ Cherkasy won 3–2 on aggregate and were promoted to the UPL; Inhulets were relegated to the First League

14 June 2023
13:00 UTC+3

Veres Rivne	6 – 1	Metalurh Zaporizhzhia
Krapyvnyi 16' (o.g.); Balan 23', 66'; Hahun 29'; Pasich 82'; Hayduchyk 89'	Report	Sokol (red card) 37'; Mohylnyi 90+1'

Avanhard Stadium, Rivne
Attendance: 0
Referee: Dmytro Bondarenko (Odesa)

Veres Rivne won 6–2 on aggregrate and both teams remained in their respective divisions

=== PFL League 1 (First League) ===
==== Group A ====
Pos	Team	Pld	W	D	L	GF	GA	GD	Pts	Promotion, qualification or relegation
1	Polissya Zhytomyr	14	13	1	0	34	6	+28	40	Qualified to the Promotion group
2	Karpaty Lviv	14	9	1	4	22	13	+9	28	Qualified to the Promotion group
3	Epitsentr Kamianets-Podilskyi	14	8	3	3	17	11	+6	27	Qualified to the Promotion group
4	Nyva Ternopil	14	5	5	4	15	8	+7	20	Qualified to the Promotion group
5	Prykarpattia Ivano-Frankivsk	14	4	3	7	11	22	−11	15	Qualified to the Relegation group
6	Dinaz Vyshhorod	14	2	4	8	14	28	−14	10	Qualified to the Relegation group
7	Bukovyna Chernivtsi	14	2	3	9	9	21	−12	9	Qualified to the Relegation group
8	Mariupol	14	1	4	9	12	25	−13	7	Qualified to the Relegation group

Source: PFL.ua
Rules for classification: 1) Points; 2) Head-to-head points; 3) Head-to-head goal difference; 4) Head-to-head goals scored; 5) Goal difference in all games; 6) Goals scored in all games (Note: calculation by criteria indicated in rules 2, 3, 4 is conducted with consideration of all teams that have an equal number of tournament points at the moment of calculation and not only among those which after preliminary criteria have appeared more successful).

==== Group B ====
Pos	Team	Pld	W	D	L	GF	GA	GD	Pts	Promotion, qualification or relegation
1	LNZ Cherkasy	14	9	3	2	22	6	+16	30	Qualified to the Promotion group
2	Obolon Kyiv	14	9	2	3	20	9	+11	29	Qualified to the Promotion group
3	Kremin Kremenchuk	14	6	3	5	28	24	+4	21	Qualified to the Promotion group
4	Metalurh Zaporizhzhia	14	5	5	4	17	16	+1	20	Qualified to the Promotion group
5	Chernihiv	14	4	4	6	13	17	−4	16	Qualified to the Relegation group
6	Poltava	14	4	3	7	15	19	−4	15	Qualified to the Relegation group
7	Skoruk Tomakivka	14	3	5	6	15	22	−7	14	Qualified to the Relegation group
8	Hirnyk-Sport Horishni Plavni	14	1	5	8	8	25	−17	8	Qualified to the Relegation group

Source: PFL.ua
Rules for classification: 1) Points; 2) Head-to-head points; 3) Head-to-head goal difference; 4) Head-to-head goals scored; 5) Goal difference in all games; 6) Goals scored in all games (Note: calculation by criteria indicated in rules 2, 3, 4 is conducted with consideration of all teams that have an equal number of tournament points at the moment of calculation and not only among those which after preliminary criteria have appeared more successful).

==== Promotion group ====
Pos	Team	Pld	W	D	L	GF	GA	GD	Pts	Promotion, qualification or relegation
1	Polissya Zhytomyr (P)	14	10	2	2	25	9	+16	32	Promotion to Ukrainian Premier League
2	Obolon Kyiv (P)	14	8	5	1	19	8	+11	29	Promotion to Ukrainian Premier League
3	LNZ Cherkasy (O, P)	14	6	4	4	19	12	+7	22	Qualification to promotion play-offs
4	Metalurh Zaporizhzhia	14	6	3	5	18	16	+2	21	Qualification to promotion play-offs
5	Karpaty Lviv	14	5	3	6	12	16	−4	18	
6	Epitsentr Kamianets-Podilskyi	14	4	3	7	12	17	−5	15	
7	Nyva Ternopil	14	0	8	6	10	17	−7	8	
8	Kremin Kremenchuk	14	1	4	9	11	31	−20	7	

Source: PFL.ua
Rules for classification: 1) Points; 2) Head-to-head points; 3) Head-to-head goal difference; 4) Head-to-head goals scored; 5) Goal difference in all games; 6) Goals scored in all games (Note: calculation by criteria indicated in rules 2, 3, 4 is conducted with consideration of all teams that have an equal number of tournament points at the moment of calculation and not only among those which after preliminary criteria have appeared more successful).
(O) Play-off winners; (P) Promoted

==== Relegation group ====
Pos	Team	Pld	W	D	L	GF	GA	GD	Pts	Promotion, qualification or relegation
9	Prykarpattia Ivano-Frankivsk	14	6	6	2	21	11	+10	24	
10	Skoruk Tomakivka (Note: Skoruk will not participate the next season due to the destruction of the Kakhovka Dam by the Russian occupation forces and depletion of water for agrarian and economical needs in Nikopol Raion.)	14	5	8	1	18	9	+9	23	Suspended its operations for the next season.
11	Bukovyna Chernivtsi	14	5	6	3	18	14	+4	21 (Note: Head-to-head goal difference: Bukovyna +4, Dinaz -1)	
12	Dinaz Vyshhorod	14	5	6	3	16	17	−1	21	
13	Chernihiv	14	5	4	5	15	16	−1	19	
14	Poltava	14	4	4	6	16	22	−6	16	
15	Mariupol	14	3	3	8	18	23	−5	12	Qualification to relegation play-off
16	Hirnyk-Sport Horishni Plavni	14	2	5	7	12	22	−10	11	~~Relegation to Ukrainian Second League~~ canceled

Source: PFL.ua
Rules for classification: 1) Points; 2) Head-to-head points; 3) Head-to-head goal difference; 4) Head-to-head goals scored; 5) Goal difference in all games; 6) Goals scored in all games (Note: calculation by criteria indicated in rules 2, 3, 4 is conducted with consideration of all teams that have an equal number of tournament points at the moment of calculation and not only among those which after preliminary criteria have appeared more successful).

==== Relegation play-offs ====
Team 1	Agg.	Team 2	1st leg	2nd leg
Khust	2–1	Mariupol	1–1	1–0

=== First leg ===
3 June 2023
14:00 UTC+3

Khust	1–1	Mariupol
Prykhodko 70'; Lutsiv (red card) 48'	Report	Litovchenko (penalty missed) 5'; Mykhaylenko 80'; Chushenko (yellow card) (yellow-red card) 32'

Karpaty Stadium, Khust
Attendance: 0
Referee: Denys Reznikov (Kamianske)

=== Second leg ===
9 June 2023
14:00 UTC+3

Mariupol	0–1	Khust
	Report	Merdyeyev 53'

Kolos Stadium, Boryspil
Attendance: 0
Referee: Serhiy Zadyran (Kyiv Oblast)

Khust won 2–1 on aggregate and was promoted to the 2023–24 Ukrainian First League. Mariupol was relegated to the 2023–24 Ukrainian Second League. Mariupol's relegation was reversed following withdrawals of Lviv and Skoruk Tomakivka.

=== PFL League 2 (Second League) ===
Pos	Team	Pld	W	D	L	GF	GA	GD	Pts	Promotion, qualification or relegation
1	Nyva Buzova (C, P)	18	13	3	2	36	8	+28	42	Promotion to Ukrainian First League
2	Khust (O, P)	18	10	5	3	32	15	+17	35 (Note: Head-to-head points: Khust 6, Chaika 5, Nyva V 3)	Qualification to promotional play-off
3	Chaika Petropavlivska Borshchahivka	18	10	5	3	33	20	+13	35	
4	Nyva Vinnytsia	18	10	5	3	29	16	+13	35	
5	Zviahel	18	9	5	4	30	17	+13	32	
6	Real Pharma Odesa	18	9	3	6	27	23	+4	30	
7	Vast Mykolaiv	18	5	2	11	21	28	−7	17	
8	Metalurh-2 Zaporizhzhia	18	4	3	11	23	37	−14	15	
9	Kremin-2 Kremenchuk	18	2	2	14	7	44	−37	8	
10	Rubikon Kyiv (Note: Rubikon Kyiv withdrew after the Round 10. It was awarded technical losses for the rest of its matches.)	18	1	1	16	6	36	−30	4	Withdrew after Round 10

Source: PFL.ua
Rules for classification: 1) Points; 2) Head-to-head points; 3) Head-to-head goal difference; 4) Head-to-head goals scored; 5) Goal difference in all games; 6) Goals scored in all games (Note: calculation by criteria indicated in rules 2, 3, 4 is conducted with consideration of all teams that have equal number of tournament points at the moment of calculation and not only among those which after preliminary criteria have appeared more successful).
(C) Champions; (O) Play-off winners; (P) Promoted

== Women's club football ==
Promoted	Omitted
Dynamo Kyiv; Shakhtar Donetsk; Dnipro-1; Veres Rivne	Zhytlobud-1 Kharkiv; Voskhod Stara Mayachka; Karpaty Lviv

- On 10 September 2022, WFC Zhytlobud-2 Kharkiv has officially transformed into a women team of FC Vorskla Poltava.

Note: For the scratched clubs, see section Clubs removed for more details

=== Vyshcha Liha ===
Pos	Team	Pld	W	D	L	GF	GA	GD	Pts	Qualification or relegation
1	Vorskla Poltava (Note: Participant of the 2021–22 Ukrainian Women's Cup final.) (C)	22	22	0	0	147	4	+143	66	Qualification for the Champions League qualifying second round
2	Kryvbas Kryvyi Rih	22	19	0	3	120	10	+110	57	Qualification for the Champions League qualifying first round
3	Kolos Kovalivka	22	16	1	5	54	12	+42	49	
4	Shakhtar Donetsk	22	16	0	6	74	27	+47	48	
5	Ladomyr Volodymyr	22	12	0	10	83	49	+34	36	
6	Dnipro-1	22	9	2	11	47	49	−2	29	
7	Dynamo Kyiv	22	9	2	11	35	41	−6	29	
8	Veres Rivne	22	6	2	14	33	71	−38	20	
9	Mariupol	22	6	1	15	23	78	−55	19	
10	EMS Podillia Vinnytsia	22	5	3	14	22	61	−39	18	
11	Pantery Uman	22	5	2	15	20	75	−55	17	
12	Ateks Kyiv (R)	22	0	1	21	8	189	−181	1	Relegation to the Persha Liha

Source: womensfootball.com.ua
Rules for classification: 1) Points; 2) Head-to-head points; 3) Head-to-head goal difference; 4) Head-to-head goals scored; 5) Goal difference; 6) Goals scored.
(C) Champions; (R) Relegated

== Managerial changes ==
This is a list of managerial changes among Ukrainian professional football clubs:

Team	Outgoing manager	Manner of departure	Date of vacancy	Table	Incoming manager	Date of appointment	Table
Vorskla Poltava	(Ukraine) Yuriy Maksymov	Dismissed	2 June 2022	Pre-season	(Ukraine) Viktor Skrypnyk	1 July 2022	Pre-season
Kryvbas Kryvyi Rih	(Ukraine) Oleksandr Babych	Mutual agreement	6 June 2022	Pre-season	(Ukraine) Yuriy Vernydub	21 June 2022	Pre-season
Zorya Luhansk	(Ukraine) Viktor Skrypnyk	Moved to Vorskla Poltava	28 June 2022	Pre-season	(Netherlands) Patrick van Leeuwen	28 June 2022	Pre-season
SC Dnipro-1	(Croatia) Igor Jovićević	End of contract	30 June 2022	Pre-season	(Ukraine) Oleksandr Kucher	29 July 2022	Pre-season
Shakhtar Donetsk	(Italy) Roberto De Zerbi	Mutual agreement	11 July 2022	Pre-season	(Croatia) Igor Jovićević	14 July 2022	Pre-season
Metalist Kharkiv	(Ukraine) Oleksandr Kucher	Moved to SC Dnipro-1	13 July 2022	Pre-season	(Ukraine) Oleh Ratiy (caretaker)	13 July 2022	Pre-season
Bukovyna Chernivtsi	(Ukraine) Yuriy Kyslytsia (acting)	End of interim	31 July 2022	Pre-season	(Ukraine) Andriy Melnychuk	31 July 2022	Pre-season
Kryvbas (women)	(Moldova) Alina Stetsenko		1 August 2022	Pre-season	(Ukraine) Volodymyr Yefimako	22 August 2022	Pre-season
Epitsentr Kamianets-Podilskyi	(Ukraine) Oleh Naduda	Change of role	2 September 2022	3rd	(Ukraine) Serhiy Nahornyak	2 September 2022	3rd
LNZ Cherkasy	(Ukraine) Yuriy Bakalov	Dismissed	6 September 2022	5th	(Ukraine) Oleksandr Kovpak (acting)	6 September 2022	5th
Veres (women)	(Ukraine) Mykola Sidorchuk	Joined Armed Forces		Pre-season	(Ukraine) Olena Ruda	8 September 2022	Pre-season
Nyva Ternopil	(Ukraine) Andriy Kuptsov	Resigned	14 September 2022	6th	(Ukraine) Serhiy Zadorozhnyi (acting)	14 September 2022	6th
