= Vladyslav Klochan =

Ukrainian footballer

Personal information
- Full name: Vladyslav Kostyantynovych Klochan
- Date of birth: 31 May 1998 (age 28)
- Place of birth: Lvove, Kherson Oblast, Ukraine
- Height: 1.78 m (5 ft 10 in)
- Position: Defensive midfielder

Team information
- Current team: Bukovyna Chernivtsi
- Number: 5

Youth career
- 2008: DYuSSh-12 Batkivshchyna Dnipropetrovsk
- 2008–2010: DYuSSh-12 Dnipropetrovsk
- 2011–2014: DVUFK Dnipropetrovsk
- 2014–2015: Dnipro Dnipropetrovsk

Senior career*
Years	Team	Apps	(Gls)
2014–2015	Dnipro Dnipropetrovsk	0	(0)
2015–2016	Oleksandriya	0	(0)
2016	Inhulets Petrove	0	(0)
2016	→ Inhulets-3 Petrove	4	(0)
2016–2018	Zirka Kropyvnytskyi	0	(0)
2019	Slavoj Boleráz	3	(0)
2019–2020	Banik Lehota pod Vtáčnikom	14	(0)
2020–2021	Skoruk Tomakivka	2	(0)
2021–	Bukovyna Chernivtsi	23	(1)
- * Club domestic league appearances and goals as of 9 October 2021

Vladyslav Kostyantynovych Klochan (Ukrainian: Владислав Костянтинович Клочан; born 31 May 1998) is a Ukrainian professional footballer who plays as a defensive midfielder for Ukrainian club Bukovyna Chernivtsi.
