= Oleksandr Klymets =

Ukrainian footballer

Personal information
- Full name: Oleksandr Serhiyovych Klymets
- Date of birth: 14 February 2000 (age 26)
- Place of birth: Ukraine
- Height: 1.74 m (5 ft 9 in)
- Position: Left midfielder

Team information
- Current team: Epitsentr Kamianets-Podilskyi
- Number: 97

Youth career
- 2013–2017: VIK-Volyn Volodymyr-Volynskyi
- 2017–2018: Munkach Mukachevo
- 2018: Volyn Lutsk

Senior career*
Years	Team	Apps	(Gls)
2018–2022	Volyn Lutsk	85	(4)
2021	→ Volyn-2 Lutsk	3	(0)
2022–2023	Karpaty Lviv	15	(0)
2023–	Epitsentr Kamianets-Podilskyi	64	(2)
- * Club domestic league appearances and goals as of 3 June 2026

Oleksandr Serhiyovych Klymets (Ukrainian: Олександр Сергійович Климець; born 14 February 2000) is a Ukrainian professional footballer who plays as a left midfielder for Ukrainian club Epitsentr Kamianets-Podilskyi.
