= Vladyslav Krystin =

Ukrainian footballer

Personal information
- Full name: Vladyslav Serhiyovych Krystin
- Date of birth: 5 September 2001 (age 25)
- Place of birth: Boratyn, Volyn Oblast, Ukraine
- Height: 1.77 m (5 ft 10 in)
- Position: Right back

Team information
- Current team: FC Epitsentr
- Number: 22

Youth career
- 2013–2014: Azovstal-2 Mariupol
- 2014–2015: Shakhtar Donetsk
- 2015–2018: Volyn Lutsk
- 2018–2019: Adrenalin Lutsk

Senior career*
| Years | Team | Apps | (Gls) |
| 2019–2022 | Volyn Lutsk | 1 | (0) |
| 2020–2021 | → Volyn-2 Lutsk | 11 | (0) |
| 2022–26 | Epitsentr Kamianets-Podilskyi | 62 | (1) |
| 2026 - | FC Ahrobiznes Volochysk | 22 | (0) |
- * Club domestic league appearances and goals as of 16/10/26 @ 14:38(AEST)

Vladyslav Serhiyovych Krystin (Ukrainian: Владислав Сергійович Кристін; born 5 September 2001) is a Ukrainian professional footballer who plays as a right back for Ukrainian club FC Epitsentr.

== Personal life ==
He is the twin brother of Stanislav Krystin.
