= Tonkocheyev Stadium =

Stadium in Kamianets-Podilskyi, Ukraine

- стадіон ім. Г.А. Тонкочеєва
- Interactive map of Tonkocheyev Stadium
- Location: Hrushevsky Avenue, 29 Kamianets-Podilskyi, Ukraine
- Coordinates: 48°40′34″N 26°35′34.5″E
- Owner: Kamianets-Podilskyi city council
- Capacity: 2,587
- Surface: Grass

Construction
- Built: 1963
- Opened: 1963; 63 years ago
- Renovated: 2010, 2022

Tenant
- Epitsentr (2023–present)

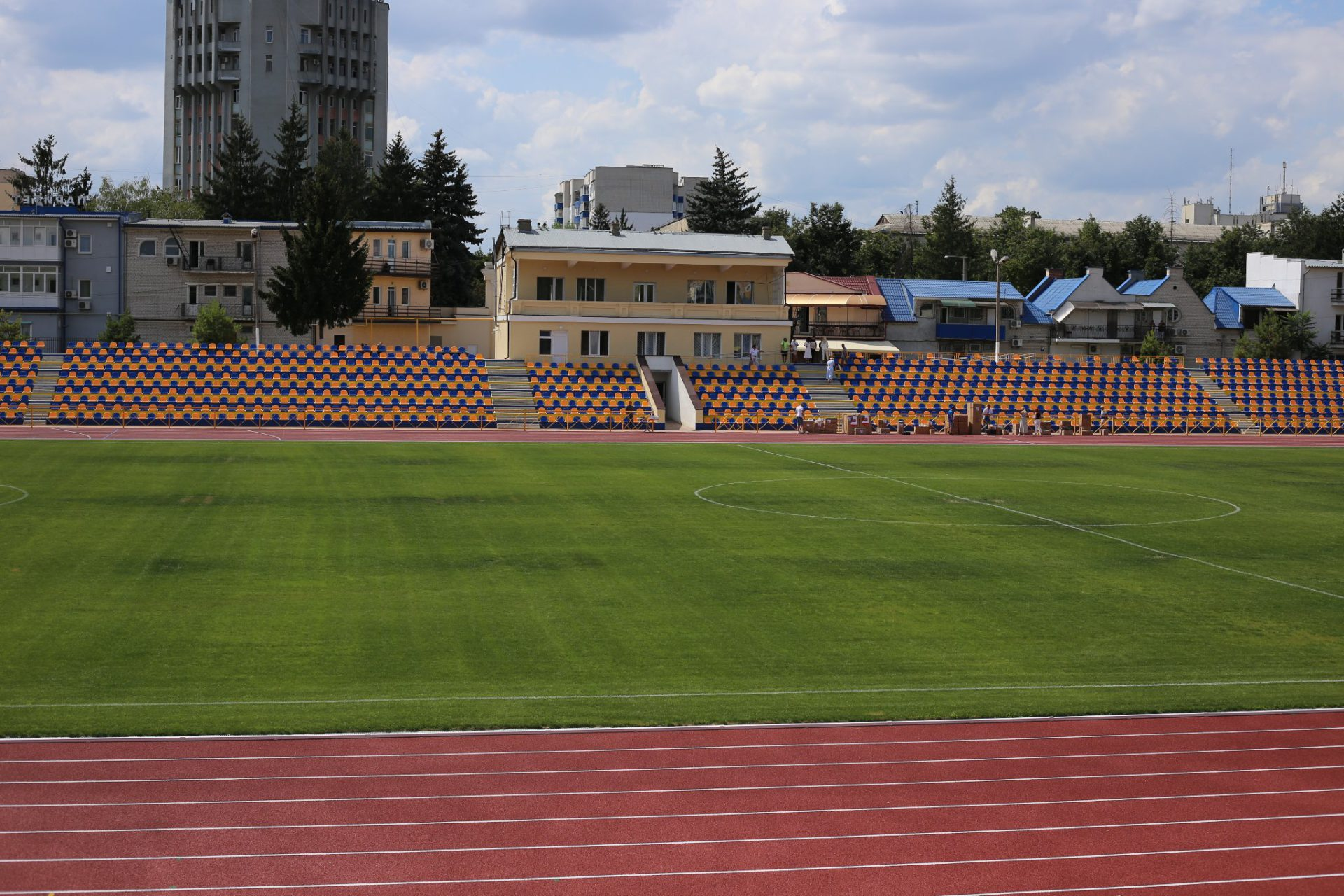

Tonkocheyev Stadium (Ukrainian: стадіон ім. Г.А. Тонкочеєва) is a football stadium in Kamianets-Podilskyi, Ukraine. It is the home stadium of FC Epitsentr Kamianets-Podilskyi who play in the 2022–23 Ukrainian First League.

In 2021, Ihor Marchuk, a People's Deputy of Ukraine, secured seven million hryvnia from a fund of social and economic development for the reconstruction of the statdium. The sadium had not received major renovation since it was built in 1963. Deputies of the Kamianets-Podilskyi city council also contributed close to five million hryvnia for reconstruction. Another 24 million was given by the State Fund for Regional Development.

Epitsentr's first home match at the renovated stadium in the 2022–23 Ukrainian First League was on 22 April 2023, a 2–1 loss against Metalurh Zaporizhzhia.
