= Serjan Repaj =

Albanian footballer

Personal information
- Date of birth: 5 September 2000 (age 26)
- Place of birth: Shkodër, Albania
- Height: 1.86 m (6 ft 1 in)
- Position: Centre back

Team information
- Current team: FC Epitsentr Kamianets-Podilskyi
- Number: 5

Youth career
- –2019: Vllaznia Shkodër

Senior career*
Years	Team	Apps	(Gls)
2019–2020	Vllaznia Shkodër	7	(0)
2020–2024	Apolonia Fier	110	(6)
2024–2025	Vllaznia Shkodër	9	(0)
2025–26	Vora	33	(0)
2026-	FC Epitsentr Kamianets-Podilskyi	6	(0)
- * Club domestic league appearances and goals as of 20/9/26 @ 13:38:57PM(AEST)

Serjan Repaj (born 5 September 2000) is an Albanian footballer who plays as a centre back for Vora in the Kategoria Superiore.

== Career ==
=== Vllaznia ===
In 2018, following several years in the club's youth academy, Repaj signed a senior contract with the club. He made his competitive debut for the club on 2 October 2019, playing the entirety of a 2-0 Cup victory over Burreli. Repaj made his Albanian Superliga debut later that season, coming on as a 71st-minute substitute for Arsid Kruja in a 5–2 away defeat to Laçi.
