= Artem Perebora =

Ukrainian footballer

Personal information
- Full name: Artem Anatoliyovych Perebora
- Date of birth: 27 February 1991 (age 35)
- Place of birth: Dnipro, Ukrainian SSR
- Height: 1.78 m (5 ft 10 in)
- Position: Midfielder

Youth career
- –2007: Dnipro Dnipropetrovsk

Senior career*
Years	Team	Apps	(Gls)
2007	LFC Dnipro Dnipropetrovsk	7	(0)
2010	Dnipro-2	13	(0)
2011–2013	Kolos Zachepylivka	52	(3)
2013–2014	Olimpik Petrykivka	37	(5)
2015	VPK-Ahro Shevchenkivka	24	(1)
2016–2023	Skoruk Tomakivka	169	(36)
2023–2024	SC Poltava	43	(3)
- * Club domestic league appearances and goals as of 1 January 2025

Artem Anatoliyovych Perebora (Ukrainian: Артем Анатолійович Перебора; born 27 February 1991) is a Ukrainian professional footballer who plays as a midfielder.
