= Nil Coch =

Spanish footballer

Nil Coch Montaña
Personal information
- Date of birth: 24 April 1998 (age 28)
- Place of birth: Tarragona, Spain
- Height: 1.85 m (6 ft 1 in)
- Position: Defender

Team information
- Current team: FC Epitsentr Kamianets-Podilskyi
- Number: 77

Youth career
- 2004–2006: Torredembarra
- 2006–2017: Gimnàstic de Tarragona

Senior career*
Years	Team	Apps	(Gls)
2017–2020	Pobla de Mafumet	14	(2)
2017–2018	→ Pobla de Mafumet B (loan)		
2017–2018	→ Betis Deportivo (loan)	11	(0)
2018	→ Badajoz (loan)	0	(0)
2019	→ Vilafranca (loan)	7	(0)
2020–2021	Vitoria (Note: served the role of SD Eibar B in 2012 to 2024)	7	(0)
2021–2022	Ascó	20	(0)
2022–2023	Oyonesa	27	(2)
2023–2024	Palencia Cristo Atlético	11	(0)
2024–2025	Pobla de Mafumet	21	(1)
2025–	Epitsentr Kamianets-Podilskyi		
- * Club domestic league appearances and goals

Nil Coch Montaña (born 24 April 1998), is a Spanish footballer who plays as a defender for FC Epitsentr Kamianets-Podilskyi in the Ukrainian Premier League since 2025.

== Personal life ==
Nil Coch was born into an athletic family; his mother was a captain of the Spanish national athletics team and a record holder, while his father is a former swimmer who also set records.

In a 2025 interview with diaridetarragona.com, regarding his move to Ukraine, Nil said, "If you get carried away by everything that encompasses change, you will get nowhere."

In September of 2026, along with another Spanish footballer of Epitsentr, a video was published where both players were singing.
