= Oleksandr Mishurenko =

Ukrainian footballer

Personal information
- Full name: Oleksandr Volodymyrovych Mishurenko
- Date of birth: 25 October 1988 (age 38)
- Place of birth: Nikopol, Ukraine
- Height: 1.85 m (6 ft 1 in)
- Position: Forward

Team information
- Current team: Skoruk Tomakivka
- Number: 9

Youth career
- 2001–2002: Kolos Nikopol
- 2002–2003: Obriy-Trubnyk Nikopol
- 2004–2005: Elektrometalurh Nikopol

Senior career*
Years	Team	Apps	(Gls)
2007	Shturm Dnipropetrovsk (amateurs)	5	(1)
2008–2009	Nikopol (amateurs)	9	(7)
2010–2012	Kolos Nikopol Raion (amateurs)	63	(33)
2013	Kolos Zachepylivka (amateurs)	4	(1)
2013–2014	Nikopol (amateurs)	22	(15)
2014	Vektor Bohatyrivka (amateurs)	5	(7)
2015	VPK-Ahro Shevchenkivka (amateurs)	12	(9)
2015–2020	Inhulets Petrove	120	(23)
2016	→ Inhulets-2 Petrove	18	(10)
2020–2021	Kryvbas Kryvyi Rih	8	(3)
2021–2023	Skoruk Tomakivka	32	(12)
2023	Tytan Odesa		
2024–	Avanhard Lozova		
- * Club domestic league appearances and goals

Oleksandr Mishurenko (Ukrainian: Олександр Володимирович Мішуренко; born 25 October 1988) is a professional Ukrainian football midfielder who plays for Skoruk Tomakivka.

He is product of several youth clubs from Nikopol, Ukraine. Mishurenko made his debut at senior level for FC Shturm Dnipropetrovsk at the Dnipro city competitions in 2007. His first professional club FC Inhulets Petrove which he joined at amateur level in 2015 Mishurenko made in 2016.

Still playing for Inhulets, Mishurenko was recognized by the PFL as a player of the month for June 2020. He became a second player of Inhulets to receive this honor.
