= Andriy Lipovuz =

Ukrainian footballer

Personal information
- Full name: Andriy Romanovych Lipovuz
- Date of birth: 29 January 1998 (age 28)
- Place of birth: Khmelnytskyi, Ukraine
- Height: 1.90 m (6 ft 3 in)
- Position: Defensive midfielder

Team information
- Current team: Epitsentr Kamianets-Podilskyi
- Number: 28

Youth career
- 2012: VIK-Volyn Volodymyr-Volynskyi
- 2012–2015: DYuSSh-1 Khmelnytskyi
- 2016–2018: Podillya Khmelnytskyi

Senior career*
Years	Team	Apps	(Gls)
2016–2022	Podillya Khmelnytskyi	138	(13)
2023–	Epitsentr Kamianets-Podilskyi	66	(6)
- * Club domestic league appearances and goals as of 3 June 2026

Andriy Romanovych Lipovuz (Ukrainian: Андрій Романович Ліповуз; born 29 January 1998) is a Ukrainian professional footballer who plays as a defensive midfielder for Ukrainian club Epitsentr Kamianets-Podilskyi .
