= Inhulets Stadium =

Stadium in Petrove, Ukraine

Ingulets
- Інгулець
- Interactive map of Ingulets
- Location: Zlahody Street, 11A Petrove, Ukraine
- Coordinates: 48°20′27.6″N 33°15′54.7″E
- Capacity: 1,869
- Surface: Grass

Construction
- Built: 2014
- Opened: 2014; 12 years ago

Tenant
- FC Inhulets Petrove (2014–present)

Ingulets Stadium (Ukrainian: Інгулець) is a football stadium in Petrove, Ukraine. It is the home stadium of FC Inhulets Petrove.

FC Kremin Kremenchuk used the stadium as home ground in the 2022–23 Ukrainian First League on 2 September 2022 in a 3:1 win against Skoruk Tomakivka.

Bahira Kropyvnytskyi a Ukrainian Women's League First League club from Kropyvnytskyi, played their home game against Shakhtar Donetsk on 14 August 2021.
