= Stanislav Krystin =

Ukrainian footballer

Personal information
- Full name: Stanislav Serhiyovych Krystin
- Date of birth: 5 September 2001 (age 25)
- Place of birth: Boratyn, Volyn Oblast, Ukraine
- Height: 1.76 m (5 ft 9 in)
- Position: Left midfielder

Team information
- Current team: Epitsentr Kamianets-Podilskyi
- Number: 11

Youth career
- 2013–2014: Azovstal-2 Mariupol
- 2014–2015: Shakhtar Donetsk
- 2015–2018: Volyn Lutsk
- 2018–2019: Adrenalin Lutsk

Senior career*
Years	Team	Apps	(Gls)
2019–2022	Volyn Lutsk	10	(0)
2020–2021	→ Volyn-2 Lutsk	21	(0)
2022–	Epitsentr Kamianets-Podilskyi	67	(5)
- * Club domestic league appearances and goals as of 3 June 2026

Stanislav Serhiyovych Krystin (Ukrainian: Станіслав Сергійович Кристін; born 5 September 2001) is a Ukrainian professional footballer who plays as a left midfielder for Ukrainian club Epitsentr Kamianets-Podilskyi.

== Personal life ==
He is the twin brother of Vladyslav Krystin.
