= Oleksiy Sydorov =

Ukrainian footballer

Personal information
- Full name: Oleksiy Ruslanovych Sydorov
- Date of birth: 7 June 2001 (age 25)
- Place of birth: Makiivka, Ukraine
- Height: 1.84 m (6 ft 0 in)
- Position: Forward

Team information
- Current team: Metalist 1925 Kharkiv
- Number: 97

Youth career
- 2013–2014: Azovstal-2 Mariupol
- 2014–2016: Shakhtar Donetsk
- 2016–2017: Metalist Kharkiv
- 2017–2018: Metalurh Zaporizhzhia

Senior career*
Years	Team	Apps	(Gls)
2018–2023	Metalurh Zaporizhzhia	69	(28)
2023–	Metalist 1925 Kharkiv	37	(2)
2025	→ Kolos Kovalivka (loan)	9	(2)
- * Club domestic league appearances and goals as of 14 June 2025

Oleksiy Ruslanovych Sydorov (Ukrainian: Олексій Русланович Сидоров; born 7 June 2001) is a Ukrainian footballer who plays as a forward for Metalist 1925 Kharkiv.

== Career ==
Sydorov is a product of Shakhtar Donetsk academy. His first coach was Yaroslav Skidan from Luhansk Oblast, while in Shakhtar Sydorov was coached by Mykola Taranov. He continued his youth career in Metalurh Zaporizhzhia for which he played in the 2018–19 Ukrainian Premier League U-19 championship.

In 2019 he was promoted to the main squad to play in the Ukrainian First League for Metalurh. Sydorov made his debut in the Ukrainian First League for Metalurh as a substitute on 27 July 2019, playing in a draw match against Obolon-Brovar Kyiv.

Sydorov was first noted as a player of the round in September 2021 during the 2021–22 Ukrainian Second League when he scored four goals in one game. Next season, after his club's promotion during the 2022–23 Ukrainian First League Sydorov again was noted several times in late August 2022 and April 2023.
