= Daniel Rueda Bodega =

Spanish footballer

Personal information
- Date of birth: 24 August 2002 (age 24)
- Place of birth: Madrid, Spain
- Height: 1.74 m (5 ft 9 in)
- Positions: Midfielder; left winger

Team information
- Current team: FC Epitsentr Kamianets-Podilskyi
- Number: 21

Youth career
- ????–2017: Getafe CF
- 2017–2020: Complutense
- 2020–2021: Rayo Vallecano U-19

Senior career*
Years	Team	Apps	(Gls)
2021–2022	Diocesano	24	(6)
2022–2023	Mirandés B	30	(6)
2023	Utebo	20	(4)
2024	Espanyol B	14	(0)
2024–2025	Fuenlabrada	36	(0)
2025–26	Beroe Stara Zagora	24	(2)
2026–	FC Epitsentr Kamianets-Podilskyi		
- * Club domestic league appearances and goals

Daniel Rueda Bodega (born 24 August 2002), also known as Nene, is a Spanish footballer who plays as a midfielder for FC Epitsentr Kamianets-Podilskyi in the Ukrainian Premier League since 2026.

== Career ==
=== Beroe Stara Zagora ===
In the summer of 2024, Nene signed with CF Fuenlabrada, joining the club after leaving RCD Espanyol reserves.

In 2025, Daniel Rueda Bodega went abroad, signing with a Bulgarian side, PFC Beroe Stara Zagora.

Following the relegation of PFC Beroe from the Bulgarian First Professional Football League (top tier), Nene signed with the Ukrainian Premier League (top tier) FC Epitsentr Kamianets-Podilskyi.
