= Oleksandr Stepanov (football manager) =

Ukrainian footballer and coach

Personal information
- Full name: Oleksandr Oleksandrovych Stepanov
- Date of birth: 7 July 1983 (age 43)
- Place of birth: Ukrainian SSR, Soviet Union
- Position: Midfielder

Senior career*
Years	Team	Apps	(Gls)
2000	FC Torpedo Zaporizhia	0	(0)
2001	FC Orion Dnipropetrovsk	21	(2)
2002	FC Elektrometalurh Nikopol	5	(1)
2002	FC Skoruk Tomakivka	5	(3)
2002	FC Vuhlyk Dymytrov	9	(0)
2003–2006	FC Avanhard Ordzhonikidze	17	(3)
2006–2007	FC Skoruk Tomakivka	19	(8)
2007–2008	FC Shakhtar Marhanets	30	(15)
2009	FC Nikopol	21	(13)
2009–2018	FC Skoruk Tomakivka	93	(28)

Managerial career
- 2010–2023: FC Skoruk Tomakivka (academy)
- 2010–2023: FC Skoruk Tomakivka
- 2025–: Skala 1911 Stryi
- * Club domestic league appearances and goals

Oleksandr Oleksandrovych Stepanov (Ukrainian: Олександр Олександрович Степанов; born 7 July 1983) is a Ukrainian professional football coach and a former player.

== Career ==
He made his professional debut on 24 March 2002 for FC Elektrometalurh Nikopol in the Ukrainian First League (tier 2) game against FC Vinnytsia. Previously, Stepanov also played a game for FC Torpedo Zaporizhia in the Ukrainian Cup in 2000, and later also played briefly for the third tier FC Vuhlyk Dymytrov. Since 2003, Stepanov stayed in regional competitions of Dnipropetrovsk Oblast in particular, playing for FC Skoruk Tomakivka since 2009.

In 2010, Stepanov was appointed a manager of the Skoruk club, as well as its sports school.
