= FC Epitsentr Kamianets-Podilskyi =

Epitsentr Kamianets-Podilskyi
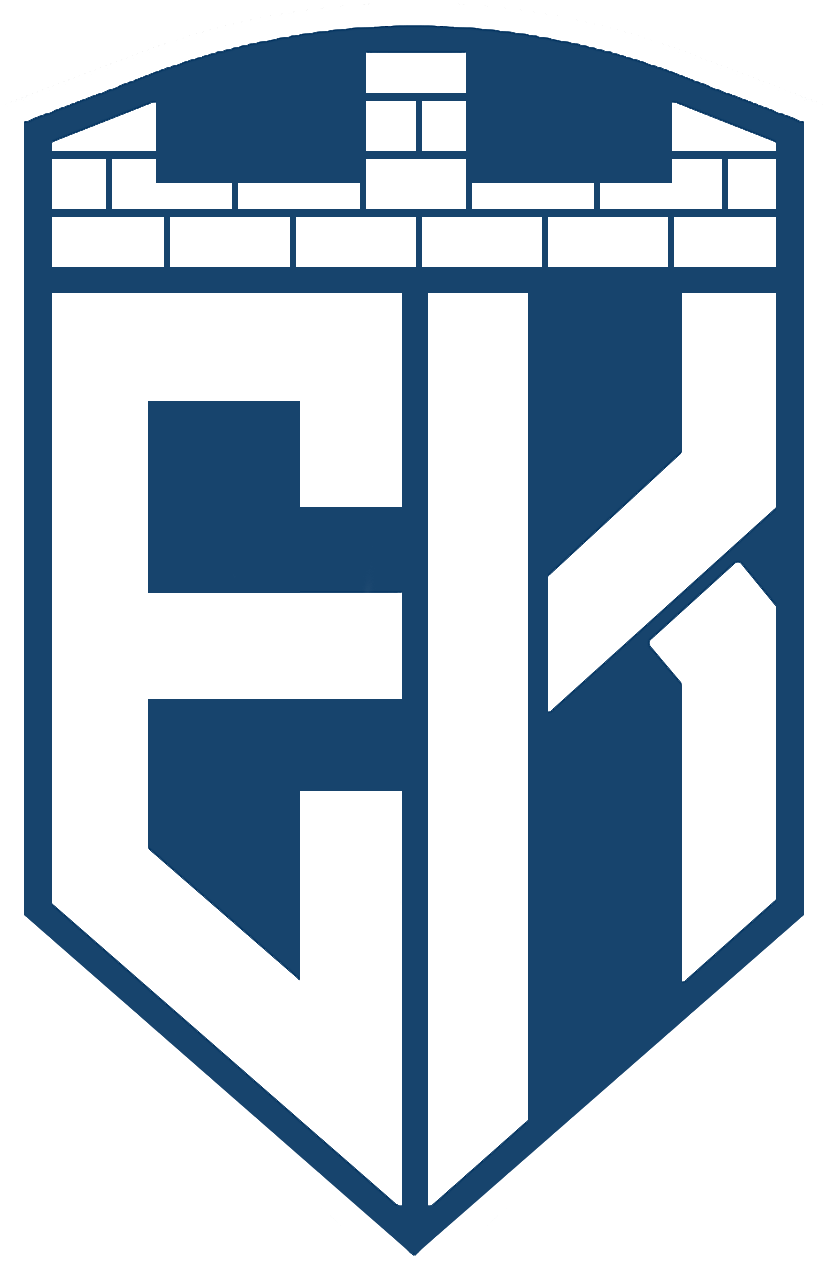
- Full name: Football Club Epitsentr Kamianets-Podilskyi
- Founded: 1960; 66 years ago
- Ground: Tonkocheyev Stadium; Kolos Stadium
- Capacity: 2,587; 2,500
- Chairman: Ivan Chernonoh
- Head coach: Serhiy Nahornyak
- League: Ukrainian Premier League
- 2025–26: Ukrainian Premier League, 10th of 16
- Website: https://fcepicentr.com.ua/
Home colours	Away colours

FC Epitsentr Kamianets-Podilskyi (Ukrainian: Футбольний клуб «Епіцентр» Кам'янець-Подільський) is a professional Ukrainian football club from the city of Kamianets-Podilskyi. The club's name "Epitsentr" was adopted from the Ukrainian brand of home improvement wholesale stores Epitsentr K. They are currently playing in the Ukrainian Premier League. Epitsentr officially moved from Dunaivtsi to Kamianets-Podilskyi in 2022.

== History ==
Formed in Dunaivtsi, the club traces its heritage to a local football club often associated with the local textile factory. The Danuivtsi football club was formed back in 1960 as Kolhospnyk Dunaivtsi, part of the Kolos sports society.

Right before the dissolution of the Soviet Union, the club was renamed Tekstylnyk again. The club's later name INAPiK has derived from a local construction company INAP. Epitsentr received professional status and debuted in the Ukrainian Second League in 2020, finishing 4th.

After Epitsentr relocated to Kamianets-Podilskyi in 2022, Dunaivtsi revived the club again.

== Name and logo history ==
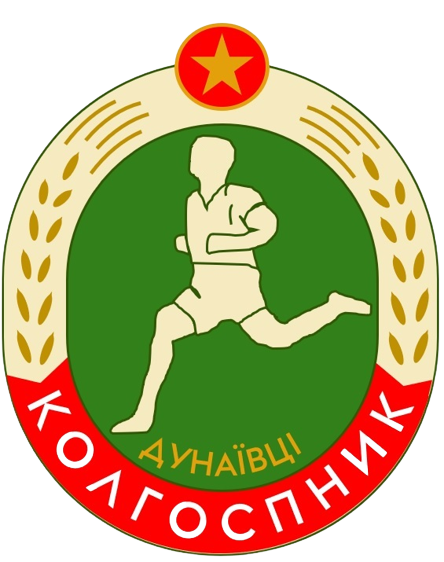
Kolhospnyk Dunaivtsi (1960s)

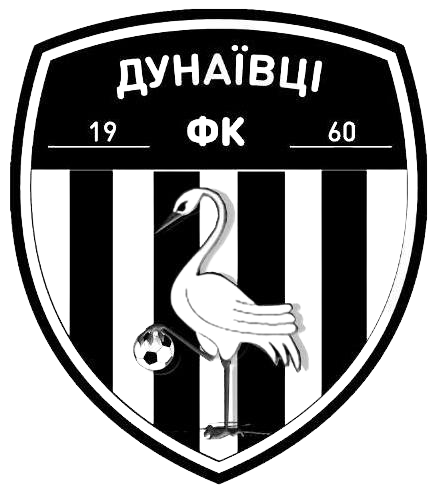
Logo before becoming Epitsentr

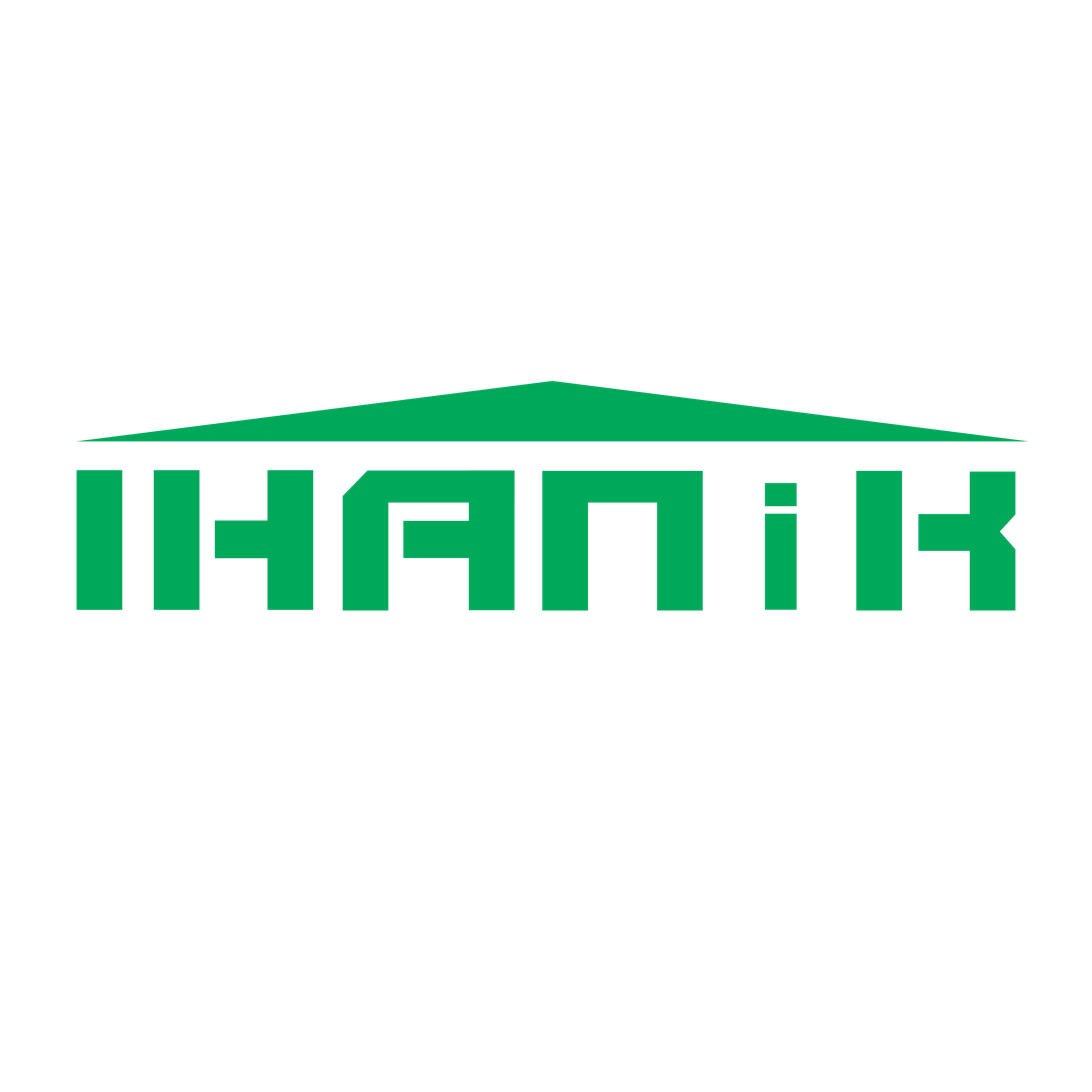
Logo INAPiK 2007–2013

Logo 2019–2022

- 1960–1991 Kolhospnyk Dunaivtsi
- 1991–1992 Tekstylnyk Dunaivtsi
- 1992–1993 Ternava Dunaivtsi
- 1993–2006 Nyva-Tekstylnyk (Kolos-Tekstylnyk)
- 2007–2008 INAPiK Dunaivtsi
- 2009–2013 Verest-INAPiK Dunaivtsi
- 2014–2018 Dunaivtsi
- 2019–2022 Epitsentr Dunaivtsi
- 2022– Epitsentr Kamianets-Podilskyi

== Honours ==
- Ukrainian First League
  - Champions (1): 2024–25

== Current squad ==
As of 7 September 2026 Note: Flags indicate national team as defined under FIFA eligibility rules; some limited exceptions apply. Players may hold more than one non-FIFA nationality.

No.	Pos.	Nation	Player
3	DF	UKR	Stepan Hryhorashchuk
4	DF	UKR	Vladyslav Moroz
5	MF	UKR	Yevhen Zaporozhets
6	MF	UKR	Kyrylo Kovalets
7	DF	UKR	Valeriy Luchkevych
8	MF	UKR	Mykola Myronyuk
10	MF	ESP	Jon Ceberio
13	DF	ALB	Serjan Repaj
14	MF	ESP	Raúl Tavares
15	FW	UKR	Maksym Yevpak
17	FW	UKR	Ivan Bendera
20	FW	UKR	Vadym Sydun

No.	Pos.	Nation	Player
21	FW	ESP	Daniel Rueda Bodega
22	GK	UKR	Arseniy Vavshko
25	DF	UKR	Vitaliy Horin
27	MF	UKR	Daniil Vashchenko
28	MF	UKR	Andriy Lipovuz
31	GK	UKR	Oleh Bilyk
59	DF	UKR	Artem Kozak
70	DF	UKR	Ihor Kyryukhantsev
71	GK	UKR	Nikita Fedotov
77	DF	ESP	Nil Coch
97	MF	UKR	Oleksandr Klymets
99	FW	ESP	Carlos Rojas

=== Out on loan ===
Note: Flags indicate national team as defined under FIFA eligibility rules; some limited exceptions apply. Players may hold more than one non-FIFA nationality.

No.	Pos.	Nation	Player
11	MF	UKR	Stanislav Krystin (at Ahrobiznes Volochysk until 30 June 2027)
12	MF	BRA	Geovane (at CRB until 31 December 2026)

No.	Pos.	Nation	Player
22	DF	UKR	Vladyslav Krystin (at Ahrobiznes Volochysk until 30 June 2027)

== Current staff ==
- Head coach – Serhiy Nahornyak
- Assistant coach – Oleh Naduda
- Goalkeeping coach – Vadym Bozhenko

== League and cup history ==
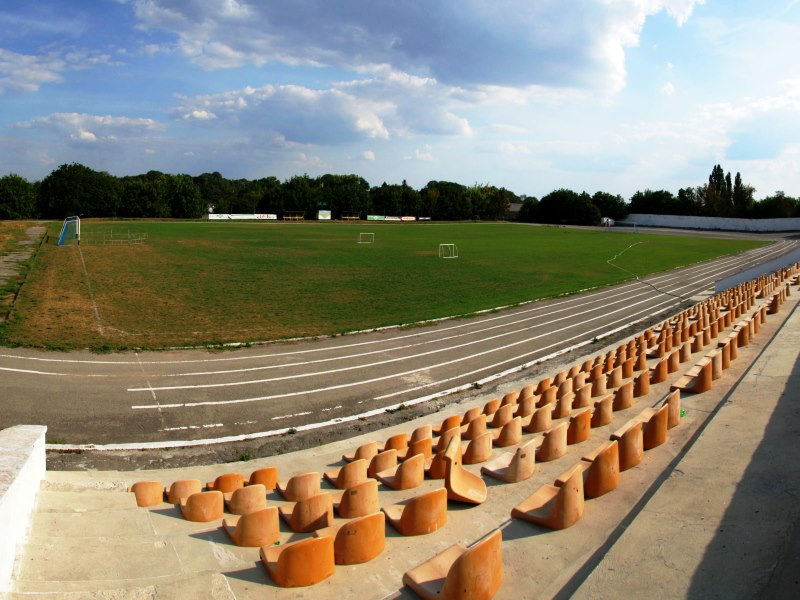
Stadion "Kolos" in 2016

Season	Div.	Pos.	Pl.	W	D	L	GS	GA	P	Domestic Cup	Europe		Notes
Epitsentr Dunaivtsi
2019–20	4th Gr"1" (Amateur League)	2/10	18	12	3	3	36	20	39	-	-	-	Play-offs – Runner-up
2019–20	4th Gr"1" (Amateur League)	2/10	18	12	3	3	36	20	39	-	-	-	Admitted to Ukrainian Second League
2020–21	3rd Gr"A" (Second League)	4/13	24	14	6	4	36	15	48	1/16 finals	-	-	-
2021–22	3rd Gr"A" (Second League)	5/15	19	12	1	6	30	19	37	1/16 finals	-	-	Admitted/Promoted to Ukrainian First League
Epitsentr Kamianets-Podilskyi
2022–23	2nd Gr"A" (First League)	3/8	14	8	3	3	17	11	27	no competition	-	-	Admitted to Promotion Group
2022–23	2nd "Promotion" (First League)	6/8	14	4	3	7	12	17	15	no competition	-	-	-
2023–24	2nd Gr"A" (First League)	2/10	18	8	7	3	27	21	31	1/16 finals	-	-	Admitted to Promotion Group
2023–24	2nd "Promotion" (First League)	4/10	28	11	11	6	39	33	44	1/16 finals	-	-	Lost Promotion playoff: Veres Rivne1-1 1-3 (2-4)
2023–24	2nd "Promotion" (First League)	4/10	28	11	11	6	39	33	44	1/16 finals	-	-	Lost in mini tournament: FC Mynai 3-3 (3–5 p)
2024–25	2nd Gr"A" (First League)	1/8	14	8	5	1	21	7	29	1/64 finals	-	-	Admitted to Promotion Group
2024–25	2nd "Promotion" (First League)	1/8	22	16	5	1	39	15	53	1/64 finals	-	-	Promoted to Ukrainian Premier League
2025–26	1st (Premier League)	10/16	30	8	8	14	36	45	32	1/64 finals	-	-	-
2026–27	1st (Premier League)	6/16	3	1	1	1	3	2	4	1/4 finals	-	-	TBD

Notes:

- During its term in the First League Promotion group, first stage results were added.

== International players ==
Had international caps for their respective countries. Players whose name is listed in bold represented their countries while playing for Epitsentr Kamianets-Podilskyi.

Ukraine

- (Ukraine) Andriy Boryachuk

== Coaches ==
- 1993–2006 Volodymyr Monastyrskyi
- 2007–2009 Mykola Kulyk
- 2009–2015 Serhiy Ihnatyev
- 2015–2019 Volodymyr Ihnatyev
- 2019–2021 Ihor Badlo
- 2021–2022 Oleh Naduda
- 2022–present Serhiy Nahornyak
