= Nazariy Fedorivskyi =

Ukrainian footballer

Personal information
- Full name: Nazariy Vasylyovych Fedorivskyi
- Date of birth: 17 April 1996 (age 30)
- Place of birth: Kyiv, Ukraine
- Height: 1.88 m (6 ft 2 in)
- Position: Goalkeeper

Team information
- Current team: Obolon Kyiv
- Number: 1

Youth career
- 2006–2008: Troyeshchyna-2 Kyiv
- 2008: Dniprovets Kyiv
- 2008–2009: BIOMED Kyiv
- 2009–2013: Zmina-Obolon Kyiv

Senior career*
Years	Team	Apps	(Gls)
2013–	Obolon Kyiv	224	(0)
2014	→ Obolon-2 Bucha (amateurs)	0	(0)
2021	→ Obolon-2 Bucha	2	(0)

International career
2014–2015	Ukraine U19	2	(0)
2016	Ukraine U21	2	(0)
- * Club domestic league appearances and goals as of 3 June 2026

Nazariy Vasylyovych Fedorivskyi (Ukrainian: Назарій Васильович Федорівський; born 17 April 1996) is a Ukrainian professional footballer who plays as a goalkeeper for Obolon Kyiv.

He is product of Kyiv sports school Zmina-Obolon Kyiv. Fedorivskyi made his debut at senior level for Obolon Kyiv at the 2013 Ukrainian Football Amateur League after which his club was promoted to professional level. His professional level debut he made for Obolon on 9 November 2013 in a home game against Hirnyk Kryvyi Rih when he came out on substitute on 89th minute.

Still playing for Obolon, Fedorivskyi was recognized as the best player of September 2019 in the Ukrainian First League by PFL.
