= Kirill Samoylenko =

Ukrainian footballer

Personal information
- Full name: Kirill Oleksiyovych Samoylenko
- Date of birth: 29 May 2001 (age 25)
- Place of birth: Sevastopol, Ukraine
- Height: 1.97 m (6 ft 6 in)
- Position: Goalkeeper

Team information
- Current team: LNZ Cherkasy
- Number: 72

Youth career
- 2014: Atlet Kyiv
- 2014–2016: Piddubny Olympic College
- 2017–2020: Dynamo Kyiv

Senior career*
Years	Team	Apps	(Gls)
2020–2021	Dnipro Cherkasy	27	(0)
2022	Kramatorsk	0	(0)
2022–	LNZ Cherkasy	24	(0)

International career^{‡}
2016	Ukraine U15	1	(0)
2016–2017	Ukraine U16	8	(0)
2017	Ukraine U17	3	(0)
- * Club domestic league appearances and goals as of 14 June 2025 ‡ National team caps and goals as of 30 July 2023

Kirill Oleksiyovych Samoylenko (Ukrainian: Кірілл Олексійович Самойленко; born 29 May 2001) is a Ukrainian professional footballer who plays as a goalkeeper for LNZ Cherkasy.

== Career ==
He is product of Dynamo Kyiv academy. Samoylenko made his debut at senior level for Dnipro Cherkasy on 5 September 2020 in a home game against Metal Kharkiv, which Dnipro Cherkasy lost 0–4.
