= Serhiy Zadorozhnyi =

Ukrainian footballer and manager

Personal information
- Full name: Serhiy Mykhaylovych Zadorozhnyi
- Date of birth: 20 February 1976 (age 50)
- Place of birth: Novoazovsk, Ukrainian SSR
- Height: 1.86 m (6 ft 1 in)
- Position: Defender

Team information
- Current team: Nyva Ternopil (caretaker manager)

Youth career
- 1980s: RBSSP Dnipropetrovsk

Senior career*
Years	Team	Apps	(Gls)
1993	Prometei Dniprodzerzhynsk	1	(0)
1993–1996	Dnipro Dnipropetrovsk	6	(0)
1995–1996	Metalurh Novomoskovsk	45	(8)
1996	Hirnyk-Sport Komsomolsk	1	(0)
1996–1998	Kremin Kremenchuk	81	(5)
1999	Torpedo Zaporizhzhia	14	(0)
1999–2003	Dnipro Dnipropetrovsk	88	(8)
1999–2003	→ Dnipro-2 Dnipropetrovsk	11	(0)
2002	→ Dnipro-3 Dnipropetrovsk	1	(0)
2003–2005	Kryvbas Kryvyi Rih	27	(0)
2005–2006	Zorya Luhansk	44	(3)
2007	Zakarpattia Uzhhorod	8	(0)
2007–2008	Nyva Ternopil	26	(1)
2008	Oleksandriya	11	(0)
Total		364	(25)

International career
2001–2002	Ukraine	6	(0)

Managerial career
- 2009–2010: Stal Dniprodzerzhynsk
- 2017–2018: Nyva Ternopil
- 2018: Dnipro-1918
- 2019: Nyva Terebovlya
- 2020: Peremoha Dnipro (sporting dnipro)
- 2020: Nyva Terebovlya
- 2020–: Nyva Ternopil (sporting director)
- 2022–: Nyva Ternopil (caretaker)
- * Club domestic league appearances and goals

Serhiy Mykhaylovych Zadorozhnyi (Ukrainian: Сергій Михайлович Задорожний, born 20 February 1976) is a Ukrainian football manager and former player.
