= Ivan Tyshchenko =

Ukrainian footballer

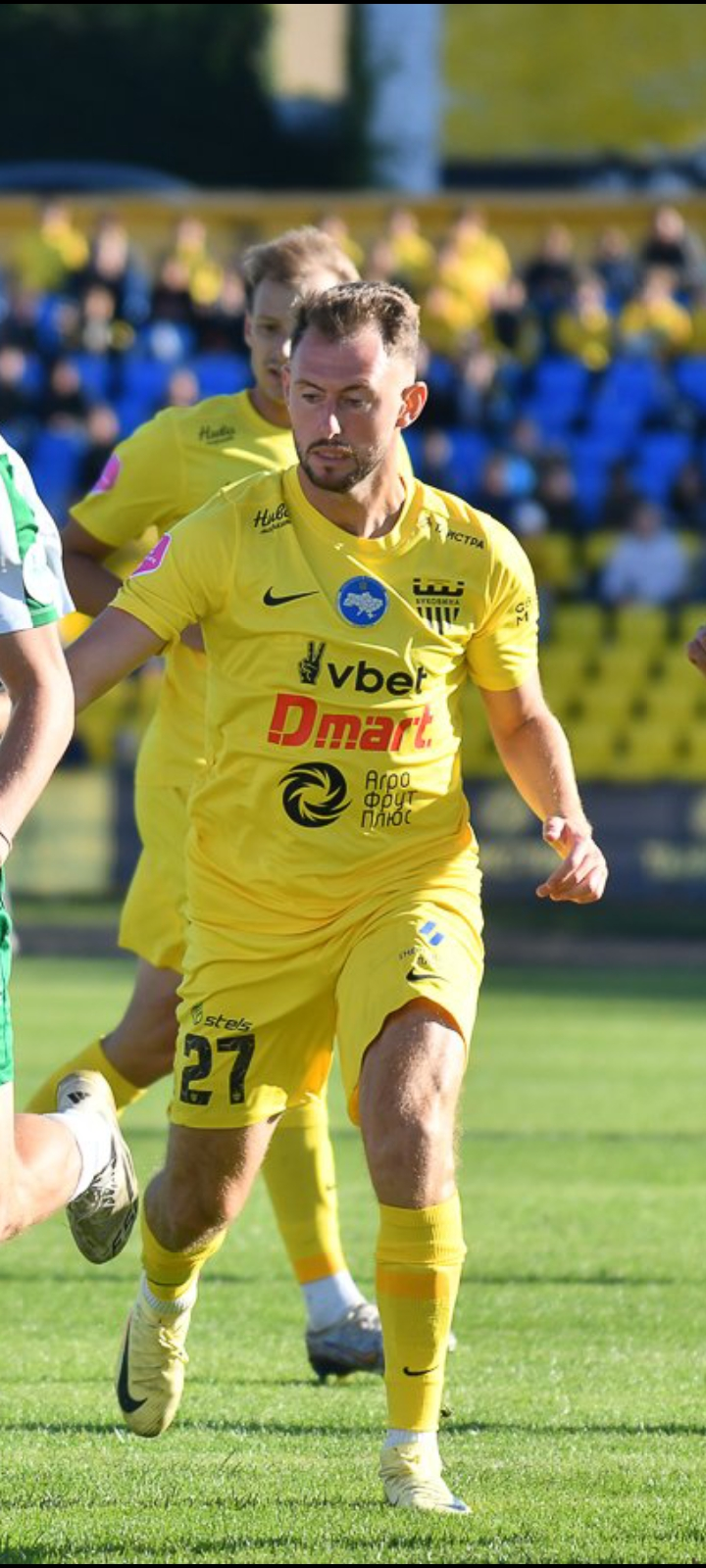

Personal information
- Full name: Ivan Oleksandrovych Tyshchenko
- Date of birth: 7 July 1998 (age 28)
- Place of birth: Cherkasy, Ukraine
- Height: 1.79 m (5 ft 10 in)
- Position: Attacking midfielder

Team information
- Current team: Grobiņa (on loan from Bukovyna Chernivtsi)
- Number: 88

Youth career
- 2010–2012: SDYuSShOR Cherkasy
- 2012–2015: RVUFK Kyiv

Senior career*
Years	Team	Apps	(Gls)
2016	Zorya-Cherkaskyi Dnipro-2 Cherkasy	9	(5)
2016–2017	Vorskla Poltava	0	(0)
2017–2018	Oleksandriya	0	(0)
2018–2019	Cherkashchyna	41	(4)
2020–2021	VPK-Ahro Shevchenkivka	27	(1)
2021–2024	LNZ Cherkasy	49	(12)
2024–	Bukovyna Chernivtsi	41	(6)
2026–	→ Grobiņa (loan)	9	(0)
- * Club domestic league appearances and goals as of 12 November 2026

Ivan Oleksandrovych Tyshchenko (Ukrainian: Іван Олександрович Тищенко; born 7 July 1998) is a Ukrainian professional footballer who plays as an attacking midfielder for Latvian club Grobiņa, on loan from Ukrainian First League club Bukovyna Chernivtsi.
