= Danylo Litovchenko =

Ukrainian footballer

Personal information
- Full name: Danylo Serhiyovych Litovchenko
- Date of birth: 21 July 2000 (age 26)
- Place of birth: Ukraine
- Height: 1.73 m (5 ft 8 in)
- Position: Central midfielder

Team information
- Current team: Nyva Buzova
- Number: 24

Youth career
- 2013–2017: Shakhtar Donetsk

Senior career*
Years	Team	Apps	(Gls)
2018–2019	Mariupol	1	(0)
2020–2021	Yarud Mariupol	30	(7)
2022	Mariupol	0	(0)
2022–2023	Mariupol	10	(3)
2023–	Nyva Buzova	2	(0)
- * Club domestic league appearances and goals as of 26 September 2023

Danylo Serhiyovych Litovchenko (Ukrainian: Данило Сергійович Літовченко; born 21 July 2000) is a Ukrainian professional footballer who plays as a central midfielder for Ukrainian club Nyva Buzova.
