= Oleh Naduda =

Ukrainian footballer and coach

Oleh Naduda Олег Надуда
Personal information
- Full name: Oleh Mykolayovych Naduda
- Date of birth: 23 February 1971 (age 55)
- Place of birth: Kyiv, Ukrainian SSR, Soviet Union
- Height: 1.69 m (5 ft 7 in)
- Position: Midfielder

Team information
- Current team: Epitsentr Kamianets-Podilskyi (assistant)

Youth career
- Dynamo Kyiv

Senior career*
Years	Team	Apps	(Gls)
1989	Dynamo Kyiv	0	(0)
1990	Nyva Myronivka	0	(0)
1990–1991	SKA Kyiv	58	(12)
1992–1994	Nyva Vinnytsia	85	(14)
1994–1995	Spartak Moscow	11	(1)
1994–1995	→ Spartak-d Moscow	22	(8)
1996–2000	Maccabi Herzliya	107	(17)

International career
1995	Ukraine	1	(0)

Managerial career
- 2006–2008: Arsenal Bila Tserkva
- 2010: Arsenal Kyiv (assistant)
- 2021–2022: Epitsentr Kamianets-Podilskyi
- 2022–: Epitsentr Kamianets-Podilskyi (assistant)
- * Club domestic league appearances and goals

Oleh Mykolayovych Naduda (Ukrainian: Олег Миколайович Надуда; born 23 February 1971) is a Ukrainian former professional footballer and current assistant coach at Epitsentr Kamianets-Podilskyi.

== Playing career ==
=== Club career ===
A native of Kyiv, Naduda is a product of the Dynamo Kyiv academy. At age 10, he, along with his classmate, decided to enroll in the Dynamo academy after seeing an announcement. During the try-outs, he was selected by Anatoliy Byshovets for the academy. Byshovets became his first coach. While in Dynamo, Naduda played a few games for the reserves.

After reaching the age of military compulsory conscription, Naduda served in the military by playing for SKA Kiev. He spent his young warrior course near Novomoskovsk (Dnipropetrovsk Oblast). While playing for SKA, Naduda made his professional-level appearance in the 1990 Soviet Second League B. After the service, Naduda received an invitation to Vinnytsia. He was visited by FC Nyva manager Vyacheslav Hrozny and the regional football federation chairman, Ihor Hataullin. It was soon after the dissolution of the Soviet Union and FC Nyva Vinnytsia was admitted to the 1992 Ukrainian Higher League. Naduda made his first appearance in the Ukrainian top tier on 6 March 1992, when Nyva was visiting Kremin Kremenchuk. Nyva lost the match 0:1, while Naduda had been substituted in the 72nd minute by Oleksandr Horshkov. Following three seasons in Vinnytsia, during which Nyva was relegated to the second tier and returned, Naduda left abroad, signing with FC Spartak Moscow.

In Spartak, Naduda played for a couple of seasons. He made his debut in the 1994 Russian Top League on 20 July 1994 for FC Spartak Moscow, when they were visiting Dynamo-Gazovik Tyumen. The match ended in a scoreless tie. With Spartak, he played his only 3 games at continental level in the 1994–95 UEFA Champions League. In his second season for Spartak, Naduda spent playing for the reserves. In November of 1995, Naduda was invited to Israel, and there he signed with Maccabi Herzliya. He spent 4.5 seasons with the Israeli club.

In 2000, Naduda retired from professional football. From 2002 to 2005, he played a few seasons at the Ukrainian Amateur Football Championship for several clubs.

=== International career ===
He played his only game for the Ukraine national football team on 26 April 1995 in a UEFA Euro 1996 qualifier against Estonia.

== Manager career ==
In 2006, Naduda became the head coach of the newly created Arsenal Bila Tserkva, which competed at a regional level (Kyiv Oblast). He led the club to their first professional season in the 2007–08 Ukrainian Second League.

In 2021, Naduda was appointed as the head coach of FC Epitsentr Dunaivtsi. The season was interrupted due the full-scale Russian invasion of Ukraine.

== Honours ==
=== Player ===
Spartak Moscow

- Russian Top League: 1994
