= Andriy Melnychuk =

Ukrainian footballer and coach

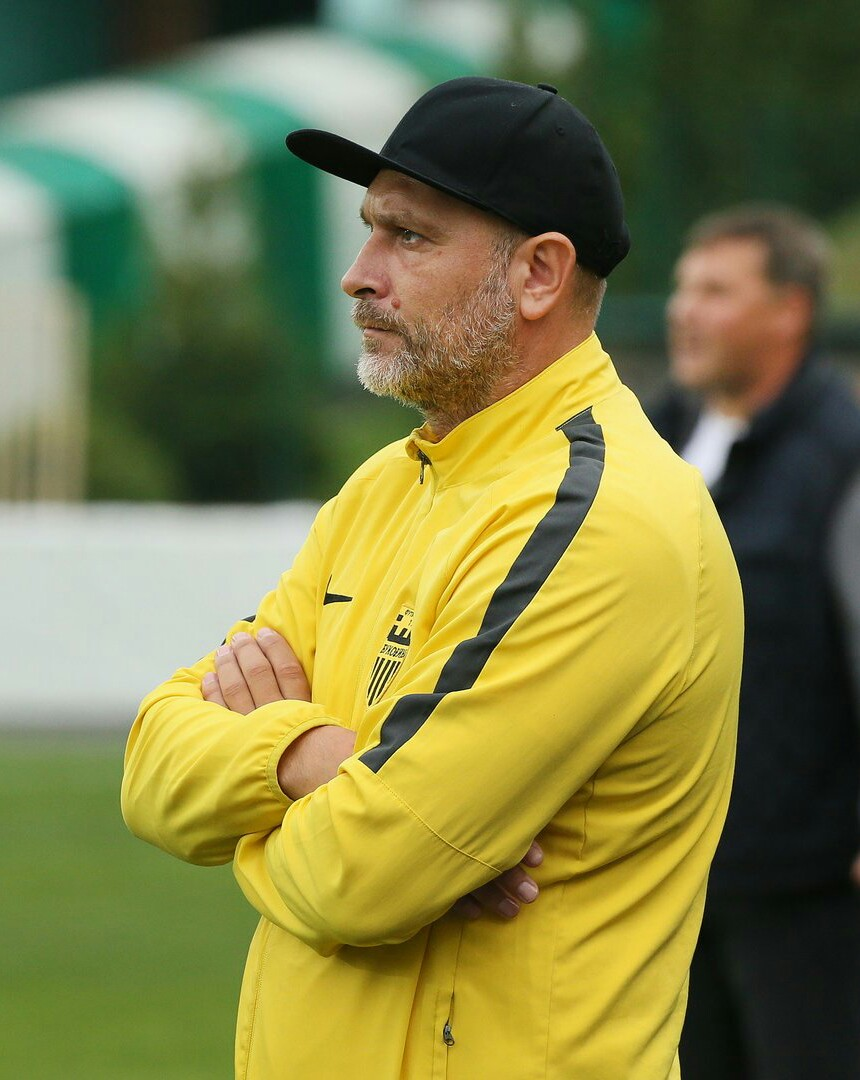

Personal information
- Full name: Andriy Yaroslavovych Melnychuk
- Date of birth: 14 November 1978 (age 47)
- Place of birth: Chernivtsi, Soviet Union (now Ukraine)
- Height: 1.90 m (6 ft 3 in)
- Position: Goalkeeper

Youth career
- 1993–1997: Lada Chernivtsi
- 1997–1998: Bukovyna Chernivtsi

Senior career*
Years	Team	Apps	(Gls)
1999	Bukovyna Chernivtsi	1	(0)
2001	Oskil Kupiansk	3	(0)
2001	Sokil Zolochiv	13	(0)
2002–2003	Spartak Ivano-Frankivsk	15	(0)
2002–2003	→ Spartak-2 Kalush	26	(0)
2004–2005	Spartak Sumy	22	(0)
2005–2006	Spartak Ivano-Frankivsk	17	(0)
2006–2007	Stal Dniprodzerzhynsk	23	(0)
2007–2008	Naftovyk-Ukrnafta Okhtyrka	7	(0)
2008	Komunalnyk Luhansk	8	(0)
2009	Stal-2 Dniprodzerzhynsk	1	(0)
2009	Bukovyna Chernivtsi	12	(0)
2010–2011	Qizilqum Zarafshon	31	(0)
2011–2015	Dinamo Samarqand	100	(0)

Managerial career
- 2016–2018: Stal Kamianske (academy)
- 2019: Bukovyna Chernivtsi
- 2020–2022: Dovbush Chernivtsi (assistant)
- 2022–: Bukovyna Chernivtsi
- * Club domestic league appearances and goals

Andriy Yaroslavovych Melnychuk (Ukrainian: Андрій Ярославович Мельничук, romanized: Andrii Yaroslavovych Melnychuk; born 14 November 1978) is a Ukrainian professional football manager and former player.

== Career ==
In 1999 he made his debut for FC Bukovyna Chernivtsi.

At the Ukrainian Premier League Melnychuk debuted for FC Naftovyk Okhtyrka in 2007 playing only 6 games and losing in 5 of them. In 2010 he went abroad to the Uzbek League joining FC Qizilqum Zarafshon from the central Uzbekistan.

In 2016 he joined coaching staff of FC Stal Kamianske. In 2019 Melnychuk was appointed a manager of his home city club Bukovyna. In 2020-2022 he assisted in reestablishment of the historical Chernivtsi sports club Dovbush. In 2022 he again was appointed a manager of Bukovyna.

== Honours ==
- Ukrainian Second League
  - champion: 2002–03 (Lukor Kalush), 2007–08 (Komunalnyk Luhansk), 2009–10 (Bukovyna Chernivtsi)
