= FC Skoruk Tomakivka =

Skoruk
- Full name: FC Skoruk Tomakivka
- Founded: 2000
- Ground: Stadion "Kolos" imeni Skoruka A.V., Tomakivka; Stadion "Olimpiyski Rezervy", Dnipro
- Chairman: Maksym Skoruk
- Head coach: none
- League: none
- 2022–23: Ukrainian First League, 10th of 16 (withdrew)
- Website: https://fcskoruk.com/
| Home colours | Away colours |

FC Skoruk Tomakivka (Ukrainian: Футбольний клуб «Скорук» (Томаківка)) is a Ukrainian football club from Tomakivka. The club is named after Anatoliy Skoruk. In June 2021, the club was admitted to the Second League.

== History ==
The club was created in 2000.

== Honours ==
- Dnipropetrovsk Oblast Championship
  - Winner (2): 2019, 2020–21
  - Runners-up (1): 2018
- Dnipropetrovsk Oblast Cup
  - Winner (1): 2020–21
  - Runners-up (2): 2018, 2019

== Head coaches ==
- 200? – 2009 Savva Rudych
- 2010 – present Oleksandr Stepanov
