= List of FC Chernihiv records and statistics =

FC Chernihiv (Ukrainian: ФК Чернігів) is a Ukrainian football club based in Chernihiv. The following is a list of FC Chernihiv records and statistics for this Ukrainian football club.

== Players in national teams ==
In October 2023, Artem Strilets become the first player belonging FC Chernihiv to be called up to the Ukraine national student football team.

=== Ukraine ===
Rank	Player	Year of Debut	Total Caps	Total Goals
Ukraine national student
1	(Ukraine) Artem Strilets	2023	4	1

The lists of players who took part in the national team during their time at the club. In bold the player currently playing for the club.

== Player records and statistics ==
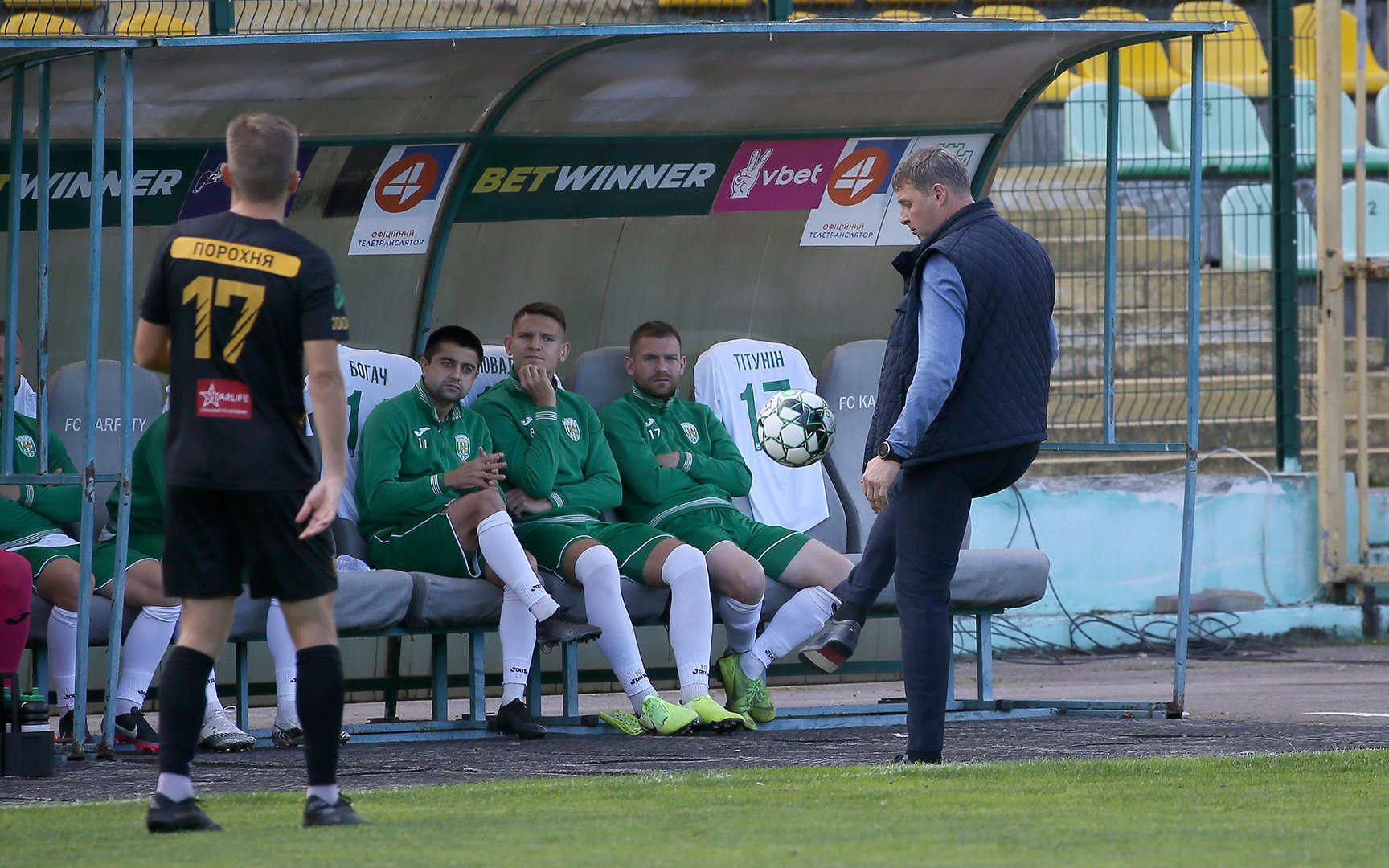
Andriy Porokhnya, the top scorer in Ukrainian Cup with Vyacheslav Koydan

=== Appearances ===
- Most goals in all competitions: (Ukraine) **Dmytro Myronenko**, 188 matches
- Most appearances in Ukrainian Cup: (Ukraine) **Artur Bybik**, 11 matches.

=== Goalkeepers ===
- Most appearances in all competitions: (Ukraine) Oleksandr Shyray, 63 matches.
- Most appearances in Ukrainian Cup: (Ukraine) **Maksym Tatarenko**, 9 matches.
- Most clean sheets in Ukrainian Second League: (Ukraine) **Maksym Tatarenko**, 13 matches in the season 2024–25
- Most clean sheets in Ukrainian Cup: (Ukraine) **Maksym Tatarenko**, 4 matches in the season 2025–26 (shared with Oleksiy Palamarchuk)

=== Goalscorers ===
- Most goals in all competitions: (Ukraine) **Vyacheslav Koydan**, 26 goals
- Most goals in Ukrainian Cup: (Ukraine) **Andriy Porokhnya** & (Ukraine) **Andriy Novikov** 2 goals

== Managerial records ==
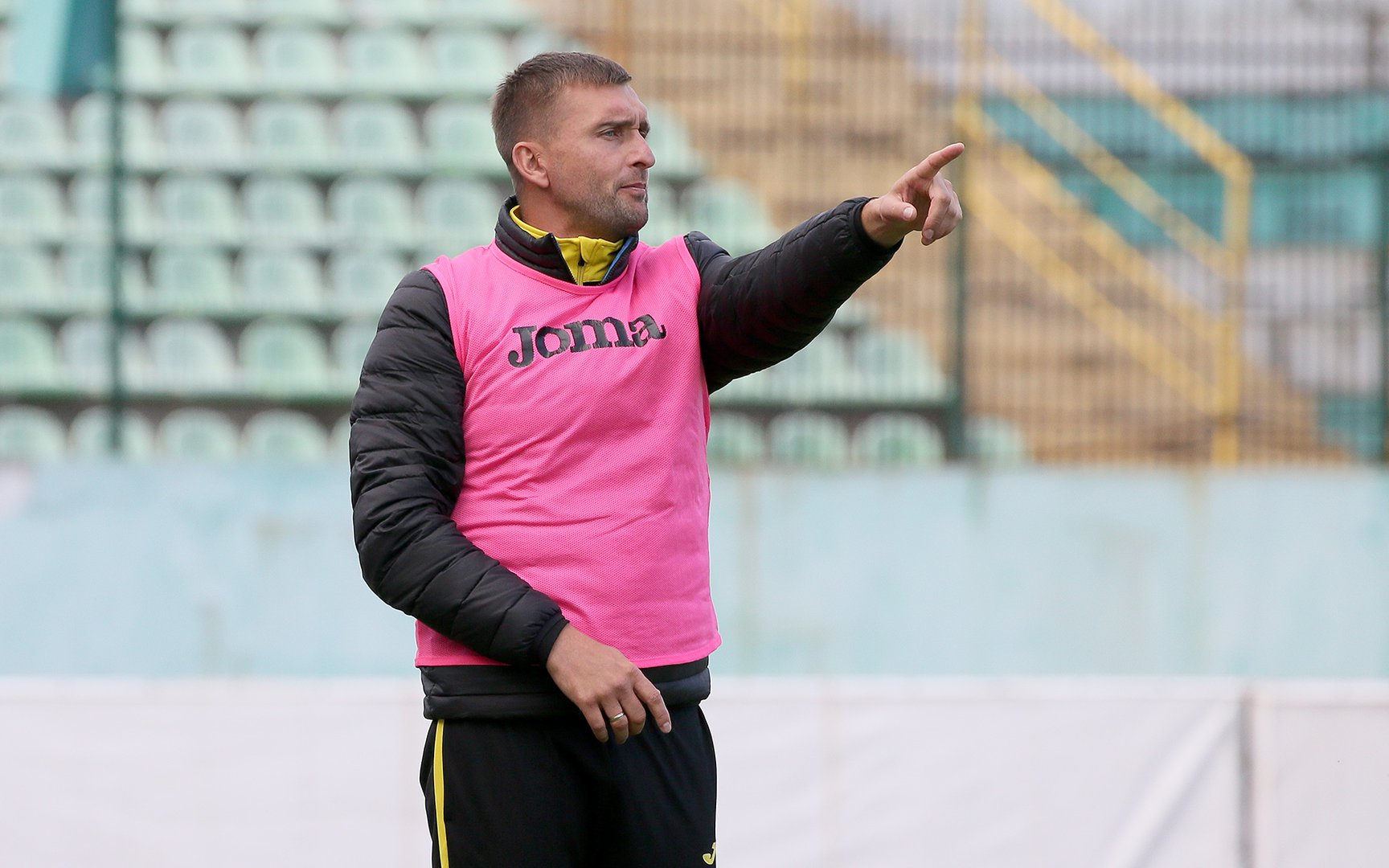
Valeriy Chornyi, the coach who led the club to the Ukrainian First League and to the 2026 Ukrainian Cup final

- Longest-serving manager: (Ukraine) Vadym Postovoy (15 years)
- Longest-serving in Ukrainian Second League: (Ukraine) Valeriy Chornyi (2 years)
- Longest-serving in Ukrainian First League: (Ukraine) Valeriy Chornyi (2 years)
- Longest-serving in Ukrainian Cup: (Ukraine) Valeriy Chornyi (5 years)

== Matches played and goals ==
#	Name	Career	Caps	Goals
1	(Ukraine) **Dmytro Myronenko**	2015, 2017–	189	20
2	(Ukraine) **Anatoliy Romanchenko**	2019–	145	17
3	(Ukraine) **Artur Bybik**	2020–	129	0
4	(Ukraine) Kyrylo Kryvoborodenko	2015, 2017–2024	128	14
5	(Ukraine) **Maksym Serdyuk**	2017–2024, 2024–	126	14
6	(Ukraine) **Vyacheslav Koydan**	2013, 2021, 2022–	122	25
7	(Ukraine) **Oleksiy Zenchenko**	2017–	116	6
8	(Georgia (country)) Teymuraz Mchedlishvili	2011–13, 2015, 2017–2021	108	15
9	(Ukraine) **Maksym Shumylo**	2021–	92	2
10	(Ukraine) Vitaliy Mentey	2020–2025	92	5
11	(Ukraine) Dmytro Borshch	2012–2015, 2017–2022	90	5
12	(Ukraine) **Dzhilindo Bezghubchenko**	2023–	82	7
13	(Ukraine) Oleksandr Konopko	2010–2021	80	9
14	(Ukraine) Bogdan Lazarenko	2017–2022	78	11
15	(Armenia) **Eduard Halstyan**	2020, 2022–	75	1
16	(Ukraine) **Andriy Porokhnya**	2021–2022, 2024–	66	5
17	(Ukraine) Oleksandr Shyray	2020–2025	63	0
18	(Ukraine) **Maksym Tatarenko**	2024–	61	0
19	(Ukraine) Oleksiy Vorobey	2012–2018	58	4
20	(Ukraine) Andriy Makarenko	2019–2024	55	1
21	(Ukraine) **Yehor Kartushov**	2025–	49	2
22	(Ukraine) Oleksandr Kravchenko	2015, 2017–2019	46	12
23	(Ukraine) **Yehor Shalfeyev**	2025–	47	4
24	(Ukraine) Anatoliy Kokhanovskyi	2017–2022	44	13
25	(Ukraine) Pavlo Fedosov	2013, 2023–2025	43	12
26	(Ukraine) Andriy Lakeyenko	2017–2018, 2020–2024	42	0
27	(Ukraine) **Dmytro Kulyk**	2022–2023, 2025–	40	5
28	(Ukraine) **Dmytro Fatyeyev**	2025-	39	2
29	(Ukraine) Ruslan Dedukh	2017–2018, 2020–2021	34	12
30	(Ukraine) **Pavlo Shushko**	2025–	34	2
31	(Ukraine) **Andriy Novikov**	2025–	34	11
32	(Ukraine) Yuriy Malyey	2012–2013	32	4
33	(Ukraine) Oleksandr Rudenko	2015–2018, 2022–2023	32	1
34	(Ukraine) Maksym Chaus	2020–2022	32	0
35	(Ukraine) Vladyslav Shkolnyi	2022–2025	31	3
36	(Ukraine) **Oleksandr Roshchynskyi**	2018–	29	0
37	(Ukraine) Andriy Veresotskyi	2020–2025	29	1
38	(Ukraine) Artem Lutchenko	2015, 2017–2021	27	0
39	(Ukraine) Daniil Volskyi	2024–2026	24	0
40	(Ukraine) Kyrylo Pinchuk	2023–2025	24	0
41	(Ukraine) **Denys Bezborodko**	2026–	23	3
42	(Ukraine) Nikita Posmashnyi	2023–2025	23	3
43	(Ukraine) Mykola Syrash	2022–2023	21	2
44	(Ukraine) Myroslav Serdyuk	2022–2023	21	3
45	(Ukraine) Dmytro Sakhno	2024–2025	21	1
46	(Ukraine) Andriy Stolyarchuk	2025–2026	18	2
47	(Ukraine) Roman Vovk	2022–2024	16	3
48	(Ukraine) Oleksiy Chorniy	2012	16	6
49	(Ukraine) Mykola Stetsko	2011–2013	16	0
50	(Ukraine) Denys Sadovyi	2017–2021	15	1
51	(Ukraine) Artem Hryshchenko	2013	15	5
52	(Ukraine) Yuriy Vashchenok	2011–2013	14	3
53	(Ukraine) Oleksandr Shakunenko	2012–2013	14	0
54	(Ukraine) **Valeriy Rohozynskyi**	2026–	13	0
55	(Ukraine) Bohdan Lytvynenko	2021–2022	12	2
56	(Ukraine) **Simon Haloian**	2026–	11	1
57	(Ukraine) **Dmytro Plakhtyr**	2026–	11	1
58	(Ukraine) Pavlo Dulzon	2012–2013	11	1
59	(Ukraine) Yevhen Bondar	2015	11	1
60	(Ukraine) Artem Strilets	2023–2024	11	0
61	(Ukraine) **Denys Herasymenko**	2023–	10	0
62	(Ukraine) Oleh Osypenko	2024	10	0
63	(Ukraine) Mykyta Teplyakov	2026	9	0
64	(Ukraine) Oleh Okhrimenko	2015	9	0
65	(Ukraine) Oleksiy Lazebnyi	2012–2013	9	2
66	(Ukraine) Vladyslav Chaban	2025–2026	8	1
67	(Ukraine) Volodymyr Zubashivskyi	2022–2023	8	0
68	(Ukraine) Yevhen Valko	2012	8	1
69	(Ukraine) Vladyslav Kyryn	2013, 2021–2022	7	0
70	(Ukraine) Yaroslav Serdyuk	2017	7	0
71	(Ukraine) Yaroslav Bykovets	2012	7	0
72	(Ukraine) Vladyslav Shapoval	2026	6	0
73	(Ukraine) Mykola Vlaev	2017	6	0
74	(Ukraine) Bogdan Lyanskoronskyi	2024–	6	0
75	(Tajikistan) **Davronbek Azizov**	2026–	6	0
76	(Ukraine) Daniil Davydenko	2023–	5	0
77	(Ukraine) Ihor Samoylenko	2021–2022	4	0
78	(Ukraine) Mykyta Hrebenshchykov	2021–2022	4	0
79	(Ukraine) Denys Kildiy	2021–2022	4	0
80	(Ukraine) Anatoliy Naumenko	2020–2021	4	0
81	(Ukraine) Danyil Khondak	2024	4	0
82	(Ukraine) Yehor Kolomiets	2022–2024	3	0
83	(Ukraine) Anatoliy Tymofeyev	2020	3	0
84	(Ukraine) Vladyslav Kosov	2020–2021	3	0
85	(Ukraine) **Dmytro Didok**	2025–	3	0
86	(Ukraine) Nikita Dorosh	2025–	2	0
87	(Ukraine) Taras Movlyan	2020	2	0
88	(Ukraine) Stanislav Khomych	2023	2	0
89	(Ukraine) Vladyslav Panko	2022–2023	1	0
90	(Ukraine) Andrey Cherniyenko	2012	1	1
91	(Ukraine) Yevhen Novobranets	2019–2020	1	0
92	(Ukraine) Ilya Seryi	2015	1	0

== Honours ==
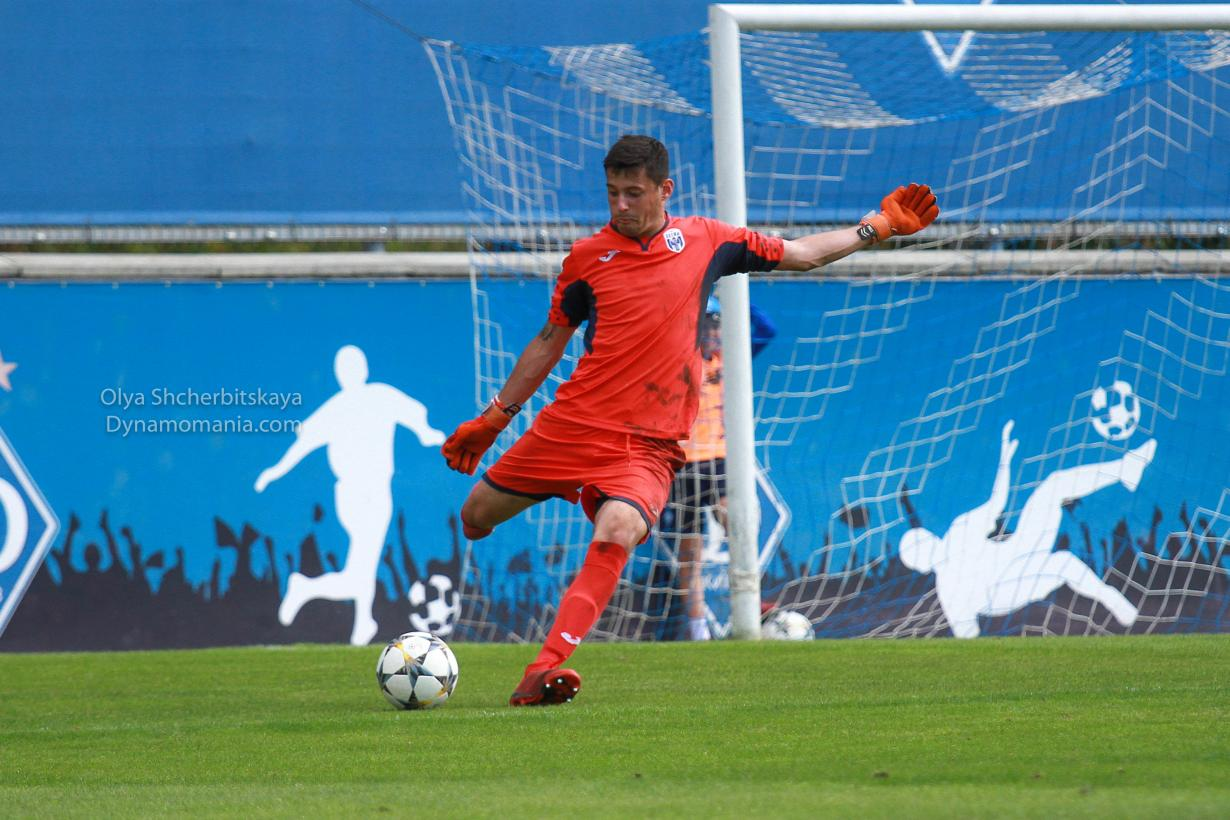
Maksym Tatarenko, nominated best goalkeeper in the Ukrainian Second League in 2024–25

=== Domestic competitions ===
Ukrainian Cup

- Runners-up (1): 2025–26

Chernihiv Oblast Football Championship

- **Winners** (1): 2019
- Runners-up (2): 2011, 2014
- Third Place (3): 2013, 2017, 2018

Chernihiv Oblast Football Cup

- **Winners** (1): 2012
- Runners-up (1) 2016

Chernihiv Oblast Super Cup:

- **Winners** (2): 2013, 2019

=== Individual Player & Coach awards ===
Best Goalkeeper of Ukrainian Second League

- (Ukraine) Maksym Tatarenkoː 2024–25 (13 clean sheets)

== Kit suppliers and shirt sponsors ==
Year	Kit manufacturer	Shirt sponsor
2020–2023	(Spain) Joma	(Germany) Jako
2023–2026	(Germany) Adidas	(Germany) Jako
2026–	(Germany) Adidas	(Ukraine) Beton

== Foreign players ==
The List of Foreign Players of FC Chernihiv.

=== Foreigners ===
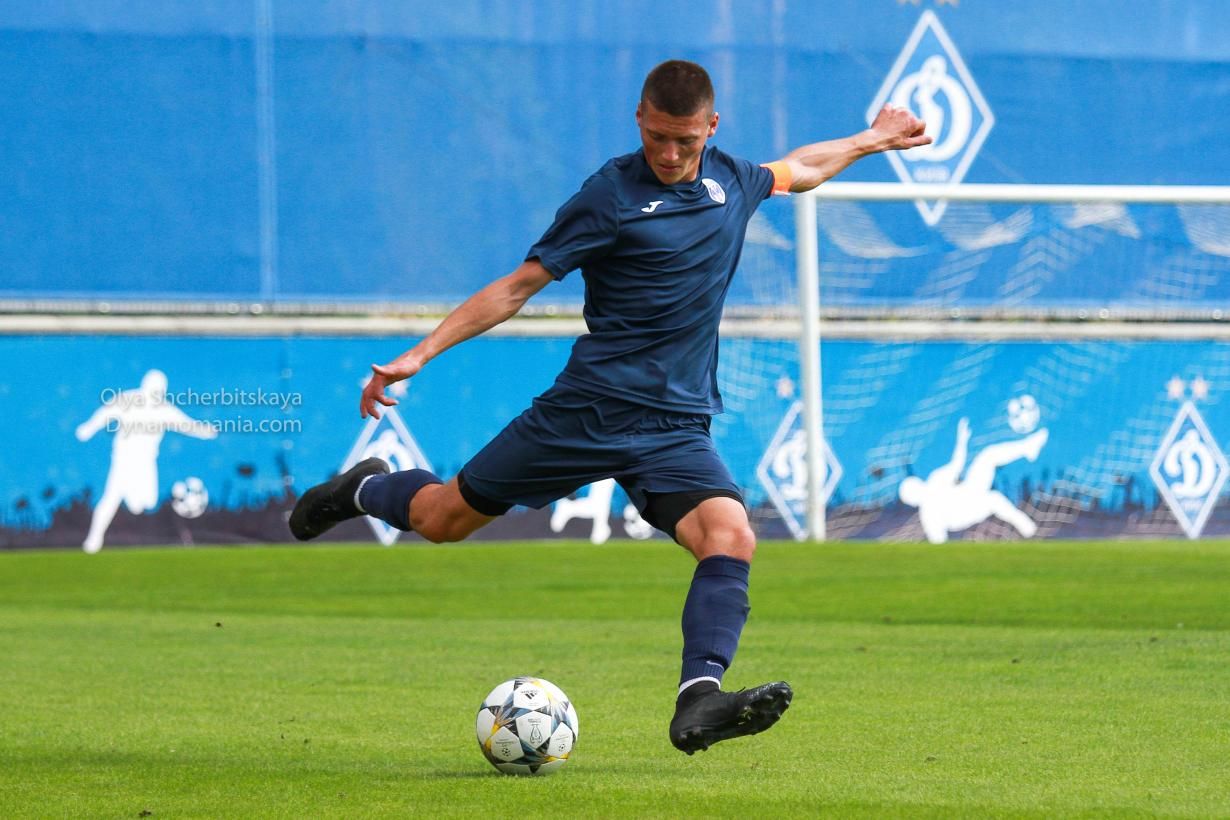
Eduard Halstyan, the armenian football player of Chernihiv

Country Born:	Nationality:	Name:	Season:	Position:	Caps:	Goals:
Armenia	(Armenia) Armenian	**Eduard Halstyan**	2020, 2022–	Defender	75	1
Tajikistan	Tajikistan	**Davronbek Azizov**	2026–	Midfielder	6	0
Russia	(Russia) Russian	**Simon Haloian**	2026–	Midfielder	11	1

=== Dual citizenship ===
Citizenship:	Dual Citizenship:	Name:	Season:	Position:	Caps:	Goals:
(Ukraine) Ukrainian	(Russia) Russian	Oleksandr Shyray	2020–2025	Goalkeeper	63	0
(Ukraine) Ukrainian	(Russia) Russian	Oleksandr Shakunenko	2012–2012	Defender	14	0
(Ukraine) Ukrainian	(Georgia (country)) Georgian	Teymuraz Mchedlishvili	2011–13, 2015, 2017–2021	Defender	108	15
(Armenia) Armenian	(Ukraine) Ukrainian	**Eduard Halstyan**	2020, 2022–	Defender	75	1
Tajikistan	(Ukraine) Ukrainian	**Davronbek Azizov**	2026–	Midfielder	6	0
(Russia) Russian	(Ukraine) Ukrainian	**Simon Haloian**	2026–	Midfielder	11	1
