= 2019–20 FC Chernihiv season =

Chernihiv
2019-20 season
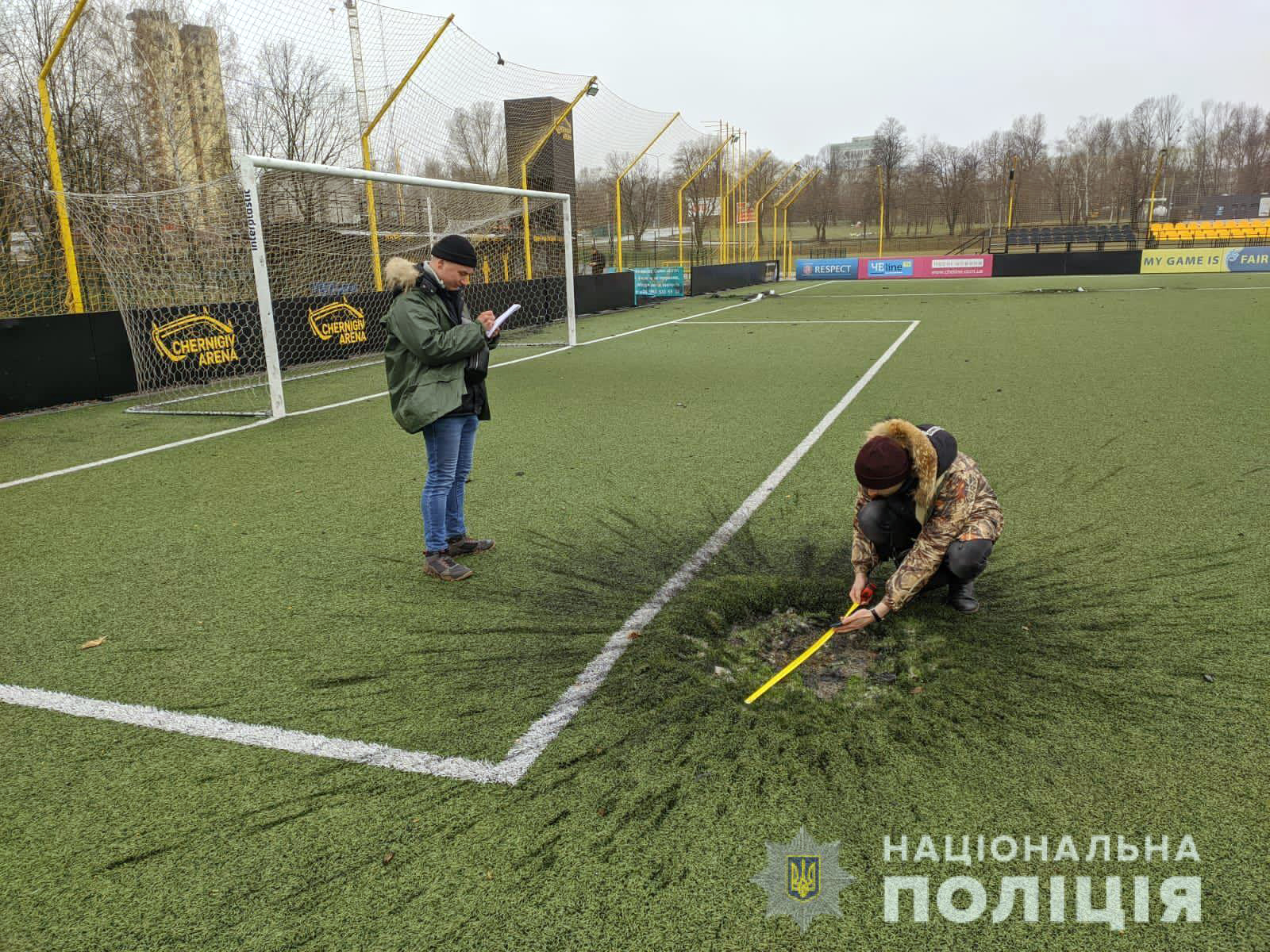
- Owner: Yuriy Synytsya
- Director: Mykola Synytsya
- Manager: Vadym Postovoy
- Stadium: Chernihiv Arena
- Championship: 1st
- Top goalscorer: League: Kyrylo Kryvoborodenko (10); All: Kyrylo Kryvoborodenko (10)
| Home colours | Away colours | Third colours |

During the 2019–20 season, FC Chernihiv competed again in the Ukrainian Amateur Football Championship.

== Season summary ==
This was the third time the club competed in the Ukrainian Amateur Football Championship and in Chernihiv Oblast Football Federation. As coach was confirmed Vadym Postovoy and the striker Pavlo Fedosov moved to Avangard Korukivka. The club signed some players such as Danylo Radych, Yaroslav Zots, Oleksandr Rudenko, Andriy Makarenko, Anatoliy Romanchenko, Anatoliy Kokhanovskyi and Eduard Halstyan from Desna-2 Chernihiv as free agents. In september 2019, the club won the 2019 Football Championship of Chernihiv Oblast. On 4 August first match of the 2019–20 Ukrainian Football Amateur League began, with match against LNZ Cherkasy at the LNZ-Arena in Cherkasy. At the ended Kyrylo Kryvoborodenko was top scorer with 10 goals.

== Players ==
=== Squad information ===
As of 19 November 2022

| Squad no. | Name | Nationality | Position | Date of birth (age) |
Goalkeepers
| 1 | Yevhen Novobranets | (Ukraine) | GK | 3 March 1993 (aged 29) |
| 12 | Danilo Radych | (Ukraine) | GK | 2 November 2002 (aged 19) |
Defenders
| 2 | Eduard Halstyan | (Ukraine) (Armenia) | DF | 1 October 1998 (aged 23) |
| 3 | Volodymyr Holovan | (Ukraine) | DF | 6 February 2001 (aged 21) |
| 4 | Teymuraz Mchedlishvili | (Georgia (country)) | DF | 18 March 1985 (aged 37) |
| 18 | Yaroslav Zots | (Ukraine) | DF | 14 December 1985 (aged 15) |
| 19 | Dmytro Borshch | (Ukraine) | DF | 22 June 1994 (aged 28) |
| 20 | Roman Chaus | (Ukraine) | DF | 18 September 1994 (aged 6) |
| 23 | Oleksiy Zenchenko | (Ukraine) | DF | 17 October 1996 (aged 25) |
| 24 | Oleksandr Rudenko | (Ukraine) | DF | 24 October 1998 (aged 23) |
| 27 | Denys Sadovyi | (Ukraine) | DF | 31 August 1995 (aged 26) |
| 77 | Vadym Silko | (Ukraine) | DF | 19 April 2001 (aged 21) |
| 99 | Oleksandr Konopko | (Ukraine) | DF | 12 April 1990 (aged 32) |
Midfielders
| 5 | Anatoliy Romanchenko | (Ukraine) | MF | 19 May 2001 (aged 21) |
| 6 | Hafar Novruzov | (Ukraine) | MF | 22 May 2001 (aged 21) |
| 7 | Dmytro Myronenko | (Ukraine) | MF | 7 March 1996 (aged 26) |
| 8 | Andriy Makarenko | (Ukraine) | MF | 13 December 1996 (aged 25) |
| 9 | Kyrylo Kryvoborodenko | (Ukraine) | MF | 8 September 1996 (aged 25) |
| 15 | Rodion Tolkachev | (Ukraine) | MF | 6 April 2001 (aged 21) |
| 95 | Bohdan Lazarenko | (Ukraine) | MF | 3 March 1995 (aged 27) |
Forwards
| 11 | Oleksandr Kravchenko | (Ukraine) | FW | 23 April 1997 (aged 25) |
| 17 | Valeriy Hordiyenko | (Ukraine) | FW | 5 October 2001 (aged 20) |

== Transfers ==
=== In ===
| Date | Pos. | Player | Age | Moving from | Type | Fee | Source |
Summer
| 8 August 2019 | GK | (Ukraine) Danylo Radych | 23 | Unattached | Transfer | Free | |
| 8 August 2019 | DF | (Armenia) Eduard Halstyan | 23 | (Ukraine) Desna-2 Chernihiv | Transfer | Free | |
| 8 August 2019 | DF | (Ukraine) Yaroslav Zots | 23 | Unattached | Transfer | Free | |
| 8 August 2019 | DF | (Ukraine) Oleksandr Rudenko | 21 | (Ukraine) Avanhard Koriukivka | Transfer | Free | |
| 8 August 2019 | MF | (Ukraine) Andriy Makarenko | 23 | (Ukraine) Polissya Dobryanka | Transfer | Free | |
| 8 August 2019 | MF | (Ukraine) Anatoliy Romanchenko | 18 | (Ukraine) Polissya Dobryanka | Transfer | Free | |
| 8 August 2019 | MF | (Ukraine) Anatoliy Kokhanovskyi | 18 | (Ukraine) Agrodim | Transfer | Free | |

=== Out ===
| Date | Pos. | Player | Age | Moving from | Type | Fee | Source |
Summer
| 8 August 2019 | FW | (Ukraine) Pavlo Fedosov | 23 | (Ukraine) Avanhard Koriukivka | Transfer | Free | |
Winter
| 1 January 2020 | FW | (Ukraine) Oleksandr Kravchenko | 26 | Unattached | End Contract | | |

== Statistics ==
=== Appearances and goals ===
| No. | Pos | Nat | Player | Total | | Ukrainian Second League | | Cup | | EL | |
| No. | Pos | Nat | Player | Apps | Goals | Apps | Goals | Apps | Goals | Apps | Goals |
Goalkeepers
| 1 | GK | (Ukraine) UKR | Yevhen Novobranets | 1 | 0 | 1 | 0 | 0 | 0 | 0 | 0 |
| 12 | GK | (Ukraine) UKR | Danylo Radych | 20 | 0 | 20 | 0 | 0 | 0 | 0 | 0 |
Defenders
| 2 | DF | (Armenia) ARM | Eduard Halstyan | 6 | 0 | 6 | 0 | 0 | 0 | 0 | 0 |
| 3 | DF | (Ukraine) UKR | Volodymyr Holovan | 10 | 1 | 10 | 1 | 0 | 0 | 0 | 0 |
| 4 | DF | (Georgia (country)) GEO | Teymuraz Mchedlishvili | 19 | 2 | 19 | 2 | 0 | 0 | 0 | 0 |
| 18 | DF | (Ukraine) UKR | Yaroslav Zots | 3 | 0 | 3 | 0 | 0 | 0 | 0 | 0 |
| 19 | DF | (Ukraine) UKR | Dmytro Borshch | 20 | 2 | 20 | 2 | 0 | 0 | 0 | 0 |
| 20 | DF | (Ukraine) UKR | Roman Chaus | 5 | 0 | 5 | 0 | 0 | 0 | 0 | 0 |
| 23 | DF | (Ukraine) UKR | Oleksiy Zenchenko | 18 | 0 | 18 | 0 | 0 | 0 | 0 | 0 |
| 24 | DF | (Ukraine) UKR | Oleksandr Rudenko | 5 | 0 | 5 | 0 | 0 | 0 | 0 | 0 |
| 27 | DF | (Ukraine) UKR | Denys Sadovyi | 9 | 1 | 9 | 1 | 0 | 0 | 0 | 0 |
| 77 | DF | (Ukraine) UKR | Vadym Silko | 0 | 0 | 0 | 0 | 0 | 0 | 0 | 0 |
| 99 | DF | (Ukraine) UKR | Oleksandr Konopko | 19 | 0 | 19 | 0 | 0 | 0 | 0 | 0 |
Midfielders
| 5 | MF | (Ukraine) UKR | Anatoliy Romanchenko | 19 | 0 | 19 | 0 | 0 | 0 | 0 | 0 |
| 6 | MF | (Ukraine) UKR | Hafar Novruzov | 3 | 0 | 3 | 0 | 0 | 0 | 0 | 0 |
| 7 | MF | (Ukraine) UKR | Dmytro Myronenko | 19 | 3 | 19 | 3 | 0 | 0 | 0 | 0 |
| 8 | MF | (Ukraine) UKR | Andriy Makarenko | 12 | 1 | 12 | 1 | 0 | 0 | 0 | 0 |
| 9 | MF | (Ukraine) UKR | Kyrylo Kryvoborodenko | 20 | 10 | 20 | 10 | 0 | 0 | 0 | 0 |
| 15 | MF | (Ukraine) UKR | Rodion Tolkachev | 2 | 0 | 2 | 0 | 0 | 0 | 0 | 0 |
| 95 | MF | (Ukraine) UKR | Bohdan Lazarenko | 19 | 3 | 19 | 3 | 0 | 0 | 0 | 0 |
Forwards
| 17 | FW | (Ukraine) UKR | Valeriy Hordiyenko | 10 | 1 | 10 | 1 | 0 | 0 | 0 | 0 |
| 77 | FW | (Ukraine) UKR | Mikita Falko | 2 | 0 | 2 | 0 | 0 | 0 | 0 | 0 |
Players transferred out during the season
| 11 | FW | (Ukraine) UKR | Oleksandr Kravchenko | 18 | 6 | 18 | 6 | 0 | 0 | 0 | 0 |

Source: Competitions

Last updated: 9 January 2025

=== Goalscorers ===
| Rank | No. | Pos | Nat | Name | Premier League | Cup | Europa League | Total |
|---|---|---|---|---|---|---|---|---|
| 1 | 9 | MF | (Ukraine) | Kyrylo Kryvoborodenko | 10 | 0 | 0 | 10 |
| 2 | 11 | FW | (Ukraine) | Oleksandr Kravchenko | 6 | 0 | 0 | 6 |
| 3 | 95 | MF | (Ukraine) | Bohdan Lazarenko | 3 | 0 | 0 | 3 |
| 4 | 4 | DF | (Georgia (country)) | Teymuraz Mchedlishvili | 2 | 0 | 0 | 2 |
| 5 | 19 | DF | (Ukraine) | Dmytro Borshch | 2 | 0 | 0 | 2 |
| 6 | 27 | DF | (Ukraine) | Denys Sadovyi | 1 | 0 | 0 | 1 |
| 7 | 3 | DF | (Ukraine) | Volodymyr Holovan | 1 | 0 | 0 | 1 |
| 8 | 17 | FW | (Ukraine) | Valeriy Hordiyenko | 1 | 0 | 0 | 1 |
| 9 | 8 | MF | (Ukraine) | Andriy Makarenko | 1 | 0 | 0 | 1 |
| | | | | Total | 27 | 0 | 0 | 27 |

Last updated: 9 January 2025

=== Clean sheets ===
| Rank | No. | Pos | Nat | Name | Premier League | Cup | Europa League | Total |
|---|---|---|---|---|---|---|---|---|
| 1 | 35 | GK | (Ukraine) | Danylo Radych | 6 | 0 | 0 | 6 |
| | | | | Total | 6 | 0 | 0 | 6 |

Last updated: 15 November 2022
