= 2020–21 FC Chernihiv season =

Chernihiv
2021–22 season
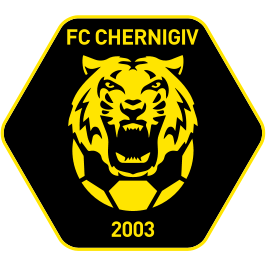
- Owner: Yuriy Synytsya
- Director: Mykola Synytsya
- Manager: Vadym Postovoy (until 21 April 2021); Valeriy Chornyi (interim, from 21 April 2021, until now)
- Stadium: Chernihiv Arena
- Ukrainian Second League: Group A, 10th of 14
- Ukrainian Cup: Round of 32 (1/64)
- Top goalscorer: League: Vyacheslav Koydan (3); All: Vyacheslav Koydan (3)
- Biggest win: Rubikon Kyiv 0-2 FC Chernihiv
- Biggest defeat: Karpaty Lviv 4-1 FC Chernihiv
Home colours	Away colours	Third colours

The 2020–21 season was FC Chernihiv's inaugural season. It competed in the Ukrainian Second League.

== Season summary ==
This was the first time the club competed in the Ukrainian Second League. The club was supported by the management and some player arrived, including Oleksandr Shyray, Oleksandr Roshchynskyi, and the experienced goalkeeper Anatoliy Tymofeyev. In the winter transfer season the management signed another experienced player in Vyacheslav Koydan. The team was also included in the First Preliminary Round of the Ukrainian Cup to face Nyva Vinnytsia. The match was supposed to be played on 29 August 2020, but the match was postponed due to a breakdown of the team's bus. In April 2021 Vadym Postovoy was sacked as coach and Valeriy Chornyi was appointed as interim coach. The club managed to finish the season in the 10th position.

== Players ==
=== Squad information ===
As of 11 April 2021

Squad no.	Name	Nationality	Position	Date of birth (age)
Goalkeepers
1	Anatoliy Tymofeyev	(Ukraine)	GK	21 February 1992 (aged 28)
12	Artem Lutchenko	(Ukraine)	GK	4 January 1992 (age 29)
14	Yevhen Novobranets	(Ukraine)	GK	3 March 1993 (aged 27)
22	Oleksandr Roshchynskyi	(Ukraine)	GK	30 November 2000 (age 20)
35	Oleksandr Shyray	(Ukraine)	GK	21 February 1992 (age 29)
Defenders
2	Anatoly Naumenko	(Ukraine)	DF	6 September 1998 (aged 21)
3	Taras Movlyan	(Ukraine)	DF	6 March 2002 (aged 18)
4	Teymuraz Mchedlishvili	(Georgia (country))	DF	18 March 1985 (age 36)
6	Andriy Veresotskyi	(Ukraine)	DF	21 January 1992 (age 29)
13	Ruslan Dedukh	(Ukraine)	DF	13 April 1998 (aged 22)
15	Andriy Lakeyenko	(Ukraine)	DF	29 September 1999 (age 21)
19	Dmytro Borshch	(Ukraine)	DF	22 June 1994 (age 26)
21	Vladyslav Kosov	(Ukraine)	DF	9 April 2000 (age 21)
23	Oleksiy Zenchenko	(Ukraine)	DF	17 October 1996 (age 24)
24	Denys Sadovyi	(Ukraine)	DF	31 August 1995 (age 25)
Midfielders
5	Anatoliy Romanchenko	(Ukraine)	MF	19 May 2001 (age 19)
7	Dmytro Myronenko	(Ukraine)	MF	7 March 1996 (age 25)
8	Andriy Makarenko	(Ukraine)	MF	13 December 1996 (age 24)
9	Kyrylo Kryvoborodenko	(Ukraine)	MF	8 September 1996 (age 24)
17	Vyacheslav Koydan	(Ukraine)	MF	5 July 1994 (age 26)
18	Vitaliy Mentey	(Ukraine)	MF	5 August 1992 (age 28)
20	Artur Bybik	(Ukraine)	MF	26 July 2001 (age 19)
77	Maksym Serdyuk	(Ukraine)	MF	21 May 2002 (age 18)
95	Bogdan Lazarenko	(Ukraine)	MF	3 March 1995 (age 26)
99	Oleksandr Konopko (Captain)	(Ukraine)	MF	18 March 1985 (age 36)
Forwards
11	Anatoly Kokhanovskyi	(Ukraine)	FW	5 October 1995 (age 25)
21	Vladyslav Kyryn	(Ukraine)	FW	13 January 1994 (age 27)
27	Maksym Chaus	(Ukraine)	FW	13 January 1994 (age 27)

== Management team ==
Position	Name	Year appointed	Last club/team
Manager	(Ukraine) Vadym Postovoy	2003	Avanhard Koriukivka
Manager	(Ukraine) Valeriy Chornyi	21 April 2021	Avanhard Koriukivka
Goalkeeping Coach	(Ukraine) Artem Padun	2020	SDYuShOR Desna Chernihiv

== Transfers ==
=== In ===
Date	Pos.	Player	Age	Moving from	Type	Fee	Source
Summer
1 July 2020	MF	(Ukraine) Taras Movlyan	18	(Ukraine) Yunist Chernihiv	Transfer	Free	
1 July 2020	DF	(Ukraine) Anatoliy Naumenko	27	Free Agent	Transfer	Free	
1 July 2020	DF	(Ukraine) Vladyslav Kosov	21	Free Agent	Transfer	Free	
29 August 2020	MF	(Ukraine) Maksym Serdyuk	18	(Ukraine) Avanhard Koryukivka	Transfer	Free	
4 September 2020	MF	(Ukraine) Andriy Lakeyenko	20	(Ukraine) Avanhard Koryukivka	Transfer	Free	
4 September 2020	MF	(Ukraine) Andriy Veresotskyi	28	(Ukraine) Kudrivka	Transfer	Free	
4 September 2020	MF	(Ukraine) Vitaliy Mentey	28	(Ukraine) Kudrivka	Transfer	Free	
12 September 2020	GK	(Ukraine) Oleksandr Shyray	27	(Ukraine) Avanhard Koryukivka	Transfer	Free	
12 September 2020	GK	(Ukraine) Oleksandr Roshchynskyi	19	(Ukraine) Avanhard Koryukivka	Transfer	Free	
18 September 2020	MF	(Ukraine) Artur Bybik	19	Free Agent	Transfer	Free	
6 October 2020	DF	(Ukraine) Ruslan Dedukh	19	(Ukraine) Nyva Ternopil	Transfer	Free	
6 October 2020	FW	(Ukraine) Maksym Chaus	27	(Ukraine) Krystal Kherson	Transfer	Free	
12 October 2020	GK	(Ukraine) Anatoliy Tymofeyev	28	(Ukraine) Cherkashchyna	Transfer	Free	
Winter
7 January 2021	GK	(Ukraine) Artem Lutchenko	19	(Ukraine) Kudrivka	Transfer	Free	
7 January 2021	FW	(Ukraine) Vladyslav Kyryn	24	(Ukraine) Kudrivka	Transfer	Free	
26 March 2021	MF	(Ukraine) Vyacheslav Koydan	19	(Sweden) Sandviken	Transfer	Free	

=== Out ===
Date	Pos.	Player	Age	Moving to	Type	Fee	Source
Summer
6 August 2020	DF	(Armenia) Eduard Halstyan	21	(Ukraine) Desna-2 Chernihiv	Transfer	Free	
6 August 2020	DF	(Ukraine) Oleksandr Rudenko	21	(Ukraine) Kudrivka	Transfer	Free	
6 August 2020	DF	(Ukraine) Volodymyr Holovan	21	(Ukraine) Kudrivka	Transfer	Free	
1 September 2020	DF	(Ukraine) Myroslav Serdyuk	21	(Ukraine) Kudrivka	Transfer	Free	
Winter
1 January 2021	GK	(Ukraine) Anatoliy Tymofeyev	26	(Ukraine) SC Poltava	Transfer	Free	
1 January 2021	GK	(Ukraine) Yevhen Novobranets	27	Unattached	Retired		
2 January 2021	DF	(Ukraine) Vladyslav Kosov	26	Retired	End Contract		
4 January 2021	DF	(Ukraine) Taras Movlyan	19	Unattached	End Contract		
1 March 2021	DF	(Ukraine) Ruslan Dedukh	22	(Ukraine) Hirnyk-Sport	Transfer	Free	

== Competitions ==
=== Overview ===
Competition	First match	Last match	Starting round	Record							
Competition	First match	Last match	Starting round	Pld	W	D	L	GF	GA	GD	Win %
Ukrainian Second League	6 September 2020	11 June 2021	Matchday 1	21	10	6	5	33	14	+19	47.62
Total				21	10	6	5	33	14	+19	47.62

Source: Results

== Pre-season and friendlies ==
Win Draw Loss

2 July 2020 Friendly	Chernihiv (Ukraine)	2–0	(Ukraine) Atlet Kyiv	Chernihiv
EET (UTC+02:00)	Kokhanovskyi 25'; Kokhanovskyi 68'	Report		Stadium: Chernihiv Arena

=== Ukrainian Second League ===
==== League table group A ====
Pos	Team	Pld	W	D	L	GF	GA	GD	Pts	Promotion, qualification or relegation
1	Podillya Khmelnytskyi (P, C)	24	17	6	1	46	13	+33	57	Promotion to Ukrainian First League
2	FC Uzhhorod (P)	24	17	4	3	50	23	+27	55	Promotion to Ukrainian First League
3	Dinaz Vyshhorod	24	15	6	3	52	19	+33	51	
4	Epitsentr Dunaivtsi	24	14	6	4	36	15	+21	48	
5	Karpaty Halych	24	14	4	6	42	25	+17	46	
6	Nyva Vinnytsia	24	10	3	11	38	38	0	33	
7	Bukovyna Chernivtsi	24	9	5	10	27	31	−4	32	
8	Chaika Petropavlivska Borshchahivka	24	6	7	11	26	32	−6	25	
9	Obolon-2 Bucha	24	6	6	12	21	39	−18	24	Promotion restrictions
10	FC Chernihiv	24	5	6	13	19	33	−14	21	
11	Rubikon Kyiv	24	4	5	15	17	44	−27	17	
12	Volyn-2 Lutsk	24	3	4	17	16	43	−27	13 (Note: Head-to-head points: Volyn-2 4, Karpaty 1)	
13	Karpaty Lviv	24	3	4	17	20	55	−35	13	Promotion restrictions
-	FC Kalush	0	-	-	-	-	-	—	0	Withdrew after Round 1 before their first game

Updated to match(es) played on 11 June 2021. Source: PFL.ua
Rules for classification: 1) Points; 2) Head-to-head points; 3) Head-to-head goal difference; 4) Head-to-head goals scored; 5) Goal difference in all games; 6) Goals scored in all games (Note: calculation by criteria indicated in rules 2, 3, 4 is conducted with consideration of all teams that have an equal number of tournament points at the moment of calculation and not only among those which after preliminary criteria have appeared more successful).
(C) Champions; (P) Promoted
Notes:

|source=pfl.ua (in Ukrainian) }}

== Competitions ==
=== Results ===
6 September 2020 1	Rubikon Kyiv	0–2	Chernihiv	Kyiv
EEST (UTC+3)		Report	Serdyuk (yellow card) 26'; Kokhanovskyi 83'; Konopko 90+2'	Stadium: Arsenal-Knyazha Arena

12 September 2020 2	Chernihiv	0–1	Epitsentr Dunaivtsi	Chernihiv
EEST (UTC+3)		Report	Ratsa 90+1'	Stadium: Chernihiv Arena

19 September 2020 3	Karpaty Lviv	4–1	Chernihiv	Lviv
EEST (UTC+3)	Pidhurskyi 16'; Kosisochukwu 46+1'; Pidhurskyi 16'; Hudzinskyi 83'	Report	Romanchenko 71'	Stadium: Ukraina Stadium

26 September 2020 4	Chernihiv	1–0	Volyn-2 Lutsk	Chernihiv
EEST (UTC+3)	Serdyuk 72'	Report		Stadium: Chernihiv Arena

17 October 2020 5	Bukovyna Chernivtsi	2–2	Chernihiv	Chernivtsi
EEST (UTC+3)	Nahornyi 18'; Palahnyuk 35'	Report	Hakman 13' (org); Veresotskyi 74'	Stadium: Bukovyna Stadium

24 October 2020 6	Uzhhorod	1–1	Chernihiv	Uzhorod
EEST (UTC+3)	Tyshchuk 90+4' (p)	Report	Borshch 33' (p)	Stadium: Avanhard Stadium

31 October 2020 7	Nyva Vinnytsia	2–0	Chernihiv	Vinnytsia
EEST (UTC+3)	Hemeha 39'; Osmolovskyi 83'	Report		Stadium: Central City Stadium

7 November 2020 8	Chernihiv	0–3	Podillya Khmelnytskyi	Kyiv
EEST (UTC+3)		Report	Salback 2'; Mchedlishvili 17' (org); Kostenko 90+4'	Stadium: Arena Livyi Bereh

11 November 2020 9	Chernihiv	1–2	Dinaz Vyshhorod	Irpin
EEST (UTC+3)	Borshch 12'	Report	Apanchuk 10'; Kiriyenko 59'	Stadium: Tsentralʹnyy Misʹkyy Stadion Chempion

14 November 2021 10	Obolon-2 Bucha	0–0	Chernihiv	Bucha
EEST (UTC+3)		Report		Stadium: Yuvileynyi Stadium

21 November 2022 11	SC Chaika	2–0	Chernihiv	Makariv
EEST (UTC+3)	Lyga 2'; Lyga 56'	Report		Stadium: Tsentralnyi Stadion

20 March 2021 12	Chernihiv	1–3	Karpaty Halych	Chernihiv
EEST (UTC+3)	Myronenko 45+1'	Report	Semchuk 33'; Khudobyak 87'; Khudobyak 90+1'	Stadium: Chernihiv Arena

27 March 2021 13	Chernihiv	0–1	Rubikon Kyiv	Chernihiv
EEST (UTC+3)		Report	Tyshchenko 58'	Stadium: Chernihiv Arena

10 April 2021 14	Chernihiv	0–1	Karpaty Lviv	Chernihiv
EEST (UTC+3)		Report	Mudryk 79'	Stadium: Chernihiv Arena

14 April 2021 15	Volyn-2 Lutsk	0–1	Chernihiv	Lutsk
EEST (UTC+3)		Report	Myronenko 36'

18 April 2021 16	Chernihiv	1–1	Obolon-2 Bucha	Chernihiv
EEST (UTC+3)	Koydan 66' (p)	Report	Kovalenko 26'	Stadium: Chernihiv Arena

24 April 2021 17	Dinaz Vyshhorod	0–0	Chernihiv	Lyutizh
EEST (UTC+3)		Report		Stadium: Dinaz Stadium

1 May 2021 18	Chernihiv	2–1	Bukovyna Chernivtsi	Chernihiv
EEST (UTC+3)	Mchedlishvili 43'; Serdyuk 90'	Report	Kalaytan 54'	Stadium: Chernihiv Arena

8 May 2021 19	Chernihiv	1–2	Uzhhorod	Chernihiv
EEST (UTC+3)	Koydan 60'	Report	Mayboroda 35'; Mayboroda 51'	Stadium: Chernihiv Arena

15 May 2021 20	Chernihiv	2–2	Nyva Vinnytsia	Chernihiv
EEST (UTC+3)	Koydan 14'; Zenchenko 47'	Report	Zagrobskyi 29'; Braslavskyi 35'	Stadium: Chernihiv Arena

23 May 2021 21	Podillya Khmelnytskyi	1–0	Chernihiv	Khmelnytskyi
EEST (UTC+3)	Kostenko 58'	Report		Stadium: SC Podillya

26 May 2021 22	Epitsentr Dunaivtsi	2–0	Chernihiv	Dunaivtsi
EEST (UTC+3)	Kuziv 6'; Bezhenar 73'	Report		Stadium: Kolos Stadium

4 June 2021 23	Chernihiv	2–0	SC Chaika	Chernihiv
EEST (UTC+3)	Lazarenko 63'; Romanchenko 75' (p)	Report		Stadium: Chernihiv Arena

11 June 2021 24	Karpaty Halych	2–1	Chernihiv	Burshtyn
EEST (UTC+3)	Lebed 11' (p); Verbnyi 79'	Report	Kokhanovskyi 73'	Stadium: Enerhetyk Stadium

=== Ukrainian Cup ===
30 September 2020 Round of 64 (1/32)	Nyva Vinnytsia (2L)	+ / – (Note: Awarded a technical result (without any score).)	(2L) FC Chernihiv	Vinnytsia
17:00 EEST (UTC+03:00)		Report

== Statistics ==
=== Appearances and goals ===
No.	Pos	Nat	Player	Total		Ukrainian Second League		Cup		EL	
No.	Pos	Nat	Player	Apps	Goals	Apps	Goals	Apps	Goals	Apps	Goals
Goalkeepers
12	GK	(Ukraine) UKR	Artem Lutchenko	3	0	3	0	0	0	0	0
22	GK	(Ukraine) UKR	Oleksandr Roshchynskyi	7	0	7	0	0	0	0	0
35	GK	(Ukraine) UKR	Oleksandr Shyray	11	0	11	0	0	0	0	0
Defenders
2	DF	(Ukraine) UKR	Anatoly Naumenko	8	0	8	0	0	0	0	0
4	DF	(Georgia (country)) GEO	Teymuraz Mchedlishvili	21	1	21	1	0	0	0	0
6	DF	(Ukraine) UKR	Andriy Veresotskyi	17	1	17	1	0	0	0	0
15	DF	(Ukraine) UKR	Andrey Lakeenko	13	0	13	0	0	0	0	0
19	DF	(Ukraine) UKR	Dmytro Borshch	21	2	21	2	0	0	0	0
23	DF	(Ukraine) UKR	Oleksiy Zenchenko	21	1	21	1	0	0	0	0
24	DF	(Ukraine) UKR	Denys Sadovyi	5	0	5	0	0	0	0	0
Midfielders
5	MF	(Ukraine) UKR	Anatoly Romanchenko	22	2	22	2	0	0	0	0
7	MF	(Ukraine) UKR	Dmytro Myronenko	19	2	19	2	0	0	0	0
8	MF	(Ukraine) UKR	Andriy Makarenko	14	0	14	0	0	0	0	0
11	MF	(Ukraine) UKR	Kyrylo Kryvoborodenko	17	0	17	0	0	0	0	0
17	MF	(Ukraine) UKR	Vyacheslav Koydan	11	3	11	3	0	0	0	0
18	MF	(Ukraine) UKR	Vitaliy Mentey	20	0	20	0	0	0	0	0
20	MF	(Ukraine) UKR	Artur Bybik	19	0	19	0	0	0	0	0
77	MF	(Ukraine) UKR	Maksym Serdyuk	20	2	20	2	0	0	0	0
95	MF	(Ukraine) UKR	Bogdan Lazarenko	18	1	18	1	0	0	0	0
99	MF	(Ukraine) UKR	Oleksandr Konopko	16	1	16	1	0	0	0	0
Forwards
11	FW	(Ukraine) UKR	Anatoly Kokhanovskyi	23	2	23	2	0	0	0	0
21	FW	(Ukraine) UKR	Vladyslav Kyryn	11	0	11	0	0	0	0	0
27	FW	(Ukraine) UKR	Maksym Chaus	20	0	20	0	0	0	0	0
Players transferred out during the season
1	GK	(Ukraine) UKR	Anatoliy Tymofeyev	3	0	3	0	0	0	0	0
14	GK	(Ukraine) UKR	Yevhen Novobranets	0	0	0	0	0	0	0	0
3	DF	(Ukraine) UKR	Taras Movlyan	2	0	2	0	0	0	0	0
13	DF	(Ukraine) UKR	Ruslan Dedukh	6	0	6	0	0	0	0	0
21	DF	(Ukraine) UKR	Vladyslav Kosov	3	0	3	0	0	0	0	0

Source: Competitions

Last updated: 10 April 2021

=== Goalscorers ===
Rank	No.	Pos	Nat	Name	Ukrainian Second League	Ukrainian Cup	Europa League	Total
1	6	MF	(Ukraine)	Vyacheslav Koydan	3	0	0	3
2	19	DF	(Ukraine)	Dmytro Borshch	2	0	0	2
2	12	MF	(Ukraine)	Dimitry Mironenko	2	0	0	2
2	6	MF	(Ukraine)	Maksym Serdyuk	2	0	0	2
2	5	MF	(Ukraine)	Anatoly Romanchenko	2	0	0	2
2	11	MF	(Ukraine)	Anatoly Kokhanovskyi	2	0	0	2
3	4	DF	(Georgia (country))	Teymuraz Mchedlishvili	1	0	0	1
3	6	DF	(Ukraine)	Andriy Veresotskyi	1	0	0	1
3	99	DF	(Ukraine)	Oleksandr Konopko	1	0	0	1
3	23	MF	(Ukraine)	Oleksiy Zenchenko	1	0	0	1
3	95	MF	(Ukraine)	Bohdan Lazarenko	1	0	0	1
				Total	18	0	0	18

Last updated: 1 May 2021

=== Clean sheets ===
Rank	No.	Pos	Nat	Name	Ukrainian Second League	Cup	Europa League	Total
1	35	GK	(Ukraine)	Oleksandr Shyray	3	0	0	3
1	22	GK	(Ukraine)	Oleksandr Roshchynskyi	3	0	0	3
				Total	6	0	0	'6

Last updated: 11 April 2021
