= List of FC Chernihiv managers =

List of all managers of Ukrainian football club FC Chernihiv.

== Managers ==
- Figures correct as of October 30, 2025. Includes all competitive matches

* Player-manager
+ Caretaker manager
M = Matches played; W = Matches won; D = Matches drawn; L = Matches lost; F = Goals for; A = Goals against

Name	Nationality	From	To	M	W	D	L	F	A	Win%	Honours	Notes
Vadym Postovoy	Ukraine	2006	2021								Chernihiv Oblast Football Championship: 2019; Chernihiv Oblast Football Cup in 2012; Admitted to Second League for the season 2020–21	
Valeriy Chornyi (Interim)	Ukraine	March; 2021	June; 2021								Ukrainian Cup: Round of 32 (1/64) in 2020–21	
Valeriy Chornyi	Ukraine	June; 2021	June 2026								Ukrainian Cup:Round of 32 (1/16) in 2021-22; Admitted to First League for the season 2022–23; Ukrainian Cup:Round of 32 (1/16) in 2024-25; Promoted to First League for the season 2025–26; Ukrainian Cup:Final in 2025-26	
Vasyl Baranov	Ukraine	June; 2026	August; 2026								Ukrainian Cup:Round of 32 (1/16) in 2026-27	
