= Oleksiy Zenchenko =

Ukrainian footballer (born 1996)

Oleksii Zenchenko
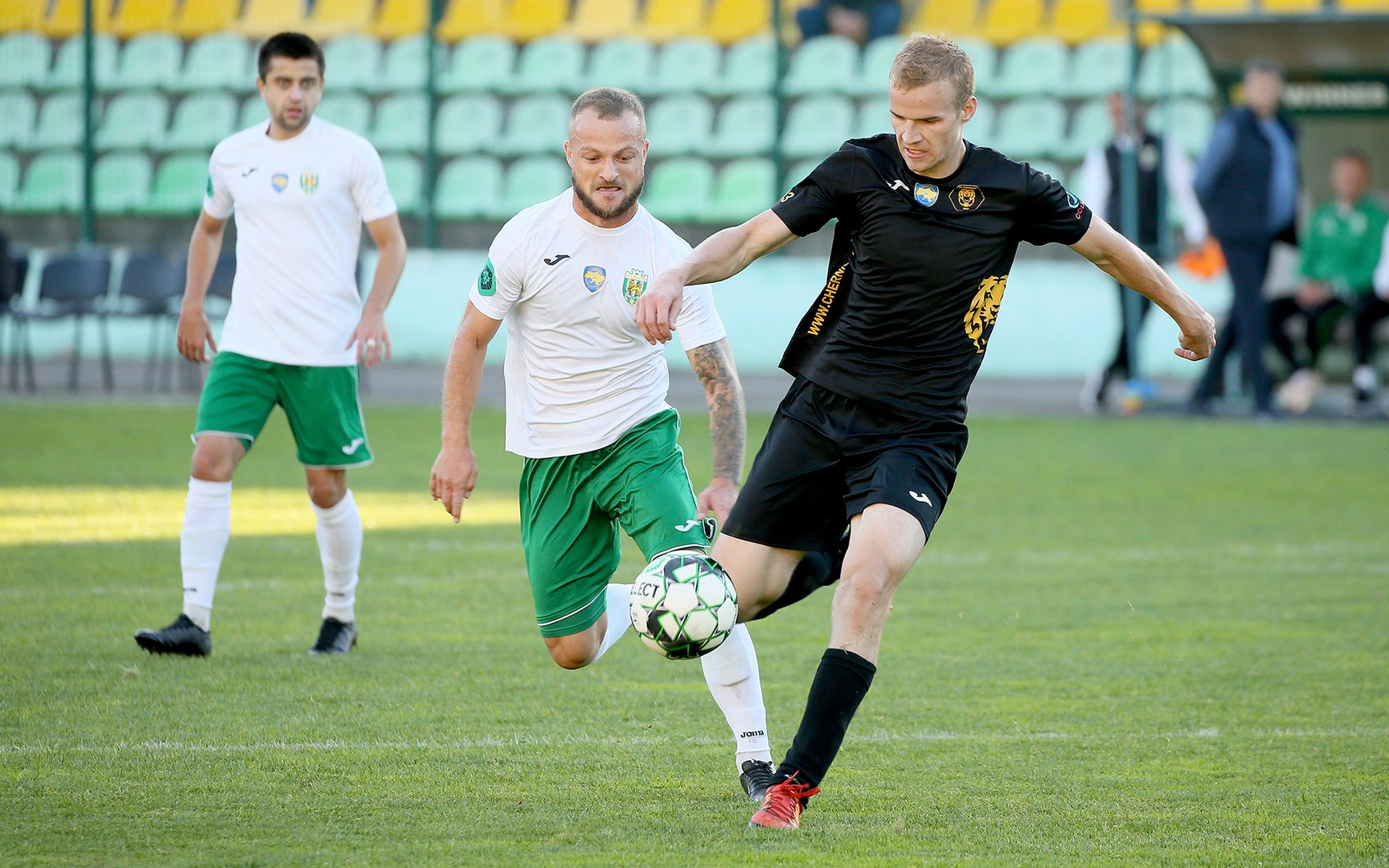
- Zenchenko with Chernihiv

Personal information
- Full name: Oleksiy Dmytrovych Zenchenko
- Date of birth: 17 October 1996 (age 30)
- Place of birth: Chernihiv, Ukraine
- Height: 1.85 m (6 ft 1 in)
- Position: Defender

Team information
- Current team: Chernihiv
- Number: 23

Youth career
- 2013: Yunist Chernihiv

Senior career*
Years	Team	Apps	(Gls)
2013–2015	Polissya Dobryanka	14	(0)
2016–2017	Yednist Plysky	17	(0)
2016–2017	Avanhard Koriukivka	2	(0)
2017–2018	Chernihiv	3	(0)
2018	Polissya Stavky	5	(0)
2018–	Chernihiv	113	(6)
- * Club domestic league appearances and goals as of 21 November 2026

Oleksiy Dmytrovych Zenchenko (Ukrainian: Олексій Дмитрович Зенченко; born 17 October 1996) is a Ukrainian footballer who plays as a defender for Chernihiv.

== Career ==
=== Early career ===
Zenchenko was a pupil of Yunist Chernihiv in 2013. He also played for Polissya Dobryanka, Yednist' Plysky, Avangard Korukivka and Polissya Stavky.

=== FC Chernihiv ===
In 2017, Zenchenko signed for FC Chernihiv, where he won the Chernihiv Oblast Football Championship in 2019. He made his debut in Ukrainian Second League against Rubikon Kyiv.

On 20 March 2021, he scored his first goal for the club against Karpaty Halych. On 18 August 2021 he made his debut in the 2021–22 Ukrainian Cup against Chaika Petropavlivska Borshchahivka. On 12 November 2022, he made his debut in the Ukrainian First League against LNZ Cherkasy at the Cherkasy Arena, replacing Artur Bybik in the 88th minute. Despite the fact that the club has been relegated in Ukrainian Second League, Zenchenko featured regularly well for Chernihiv and he was appointed as captain of the team, replacing Vitaliy Mentey.

He helped the club to get third place in the league and get the promotion to Ukrainian First League. Due to his performance, he was included in the Best XI of Ukrainian Second League of the season 2024–25 Ukrainian Second League.

In summer 2025, he extended his contract with the club and in November, he managed to rich 100 official appearances with the club. Oleksiy played FC Chernihiv's matches in the Ukrainian Cup, impressing enough helping the club to qualify for the round of 4 for the first time. Due to his performance in the match against Nyva Ternopil, he was included in the Best XI of Round 23 of the 2025–26 Ukrainian First League.

On 22 April 2026 with the club he managed to get into the final of Ukrainian Cup for the first time after beating Metalist 1925 Kharkiv, on a penalty shootout 6–5 at the Tsentralnyi Stadion in Zhytomyr after Zenchenko scored the last penalty of the victory.

On 22 May 2026, he was selected in the starting lineup for the 2026 Ukrainian Cup final, where the first half ended 1-1 and at the end of the second half Dynamo Kyiv won 1-3.

On 26 May 2026, he scored the opening goal against Metalist Kharkiv in the Ukrainian First League, but the Kharkiv team eventually turned the tables. Oleksiy described the defeat and admitted that the team will need to win their next two games to stay up.

== Career statistics ==
=== Club ===
As of match played 21 November 2026

Appearances and goals by club, season and competition
Club	Season	League			Cup		Europe		Other		Total	
Club	Season	Division	Apps	Goals	Apps	Goals	Apps	Goals	Apps	Goals	Apps	Goals
Yednist' Plysky	2016	Ukrainian Football Amateur League	8	0	0	0	0	0	0	0	8	0
Yednist' Plysky	2016–17	Ukrainian Football Amateur League	9	0	0	0	0	0	0	0	9	0
Avangard Korukivka	2016–17	Chernihiv Oblast Football Federation	2	0	0	0	0	0	0	0	2	0
Chernihiv	2017–18	Chernihiv Oblast Football Federation	2	0	0	0	0	0	0	0	2	0
Polissya Stavky	2017–18	Zhytomyr Oblast Football Federation	5	0	0	0	0	0	0	0	5	0
Chernihiv	2018–19	Chernihiv Oblast Football Federation	1	0	0	0	0	0	0	0	1	0
Chernihiv	2019–20	Chernihiv Oblast Football Federation	0	0	0	0	0	0	0	0	0	0
Chernihiv	2020–21	Ukrainian Second League	18	1	0	0	0	0	0	0	18	1
Chernihiv	2021–22	Ukrainian Second League	16	2	2	0	0	0	0	0	18	2
Chernihiv	2022–23	Ukrainian First League	11	1	0	0	0	0	0	0	11	1
Chernihiv	2023–24	Ukrainian First League	24	0	1	0	0	0	0	0	25	0
Chernihiv	2024–25	Ukrainian Second League	15	1	2	0	0	0	2	0	19	1
Chernihiv	2025–26	Ukrainian First League	21	1	6	0	0	0	0	0	27	1
Chernihiv	2026–27	Ukrainian First League	8	0	2	0	0	0	0	0	10	0
Career total			121	6	12	0	0	0	2	0	135	6

== Honours ==
Chernihiv

- Chernihiv Oblast Football Championship: 2019
- Ukrainian Cup runner-up: 2025–26

Individual

- Honoured Master of Sport of Ukraine

== Gallery ==
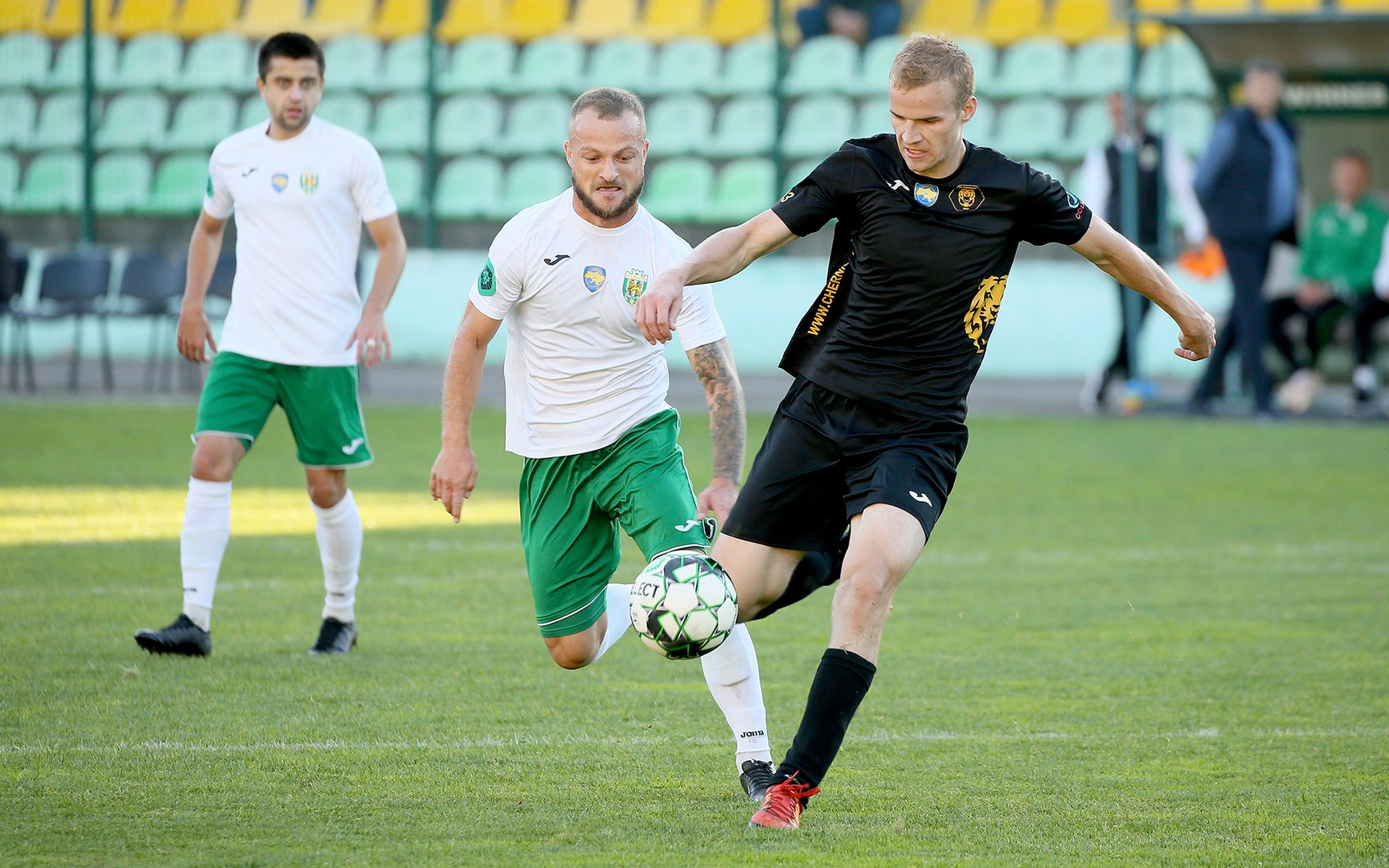
Oleksiy with Chernihiv in the match against Karpaty Lviv

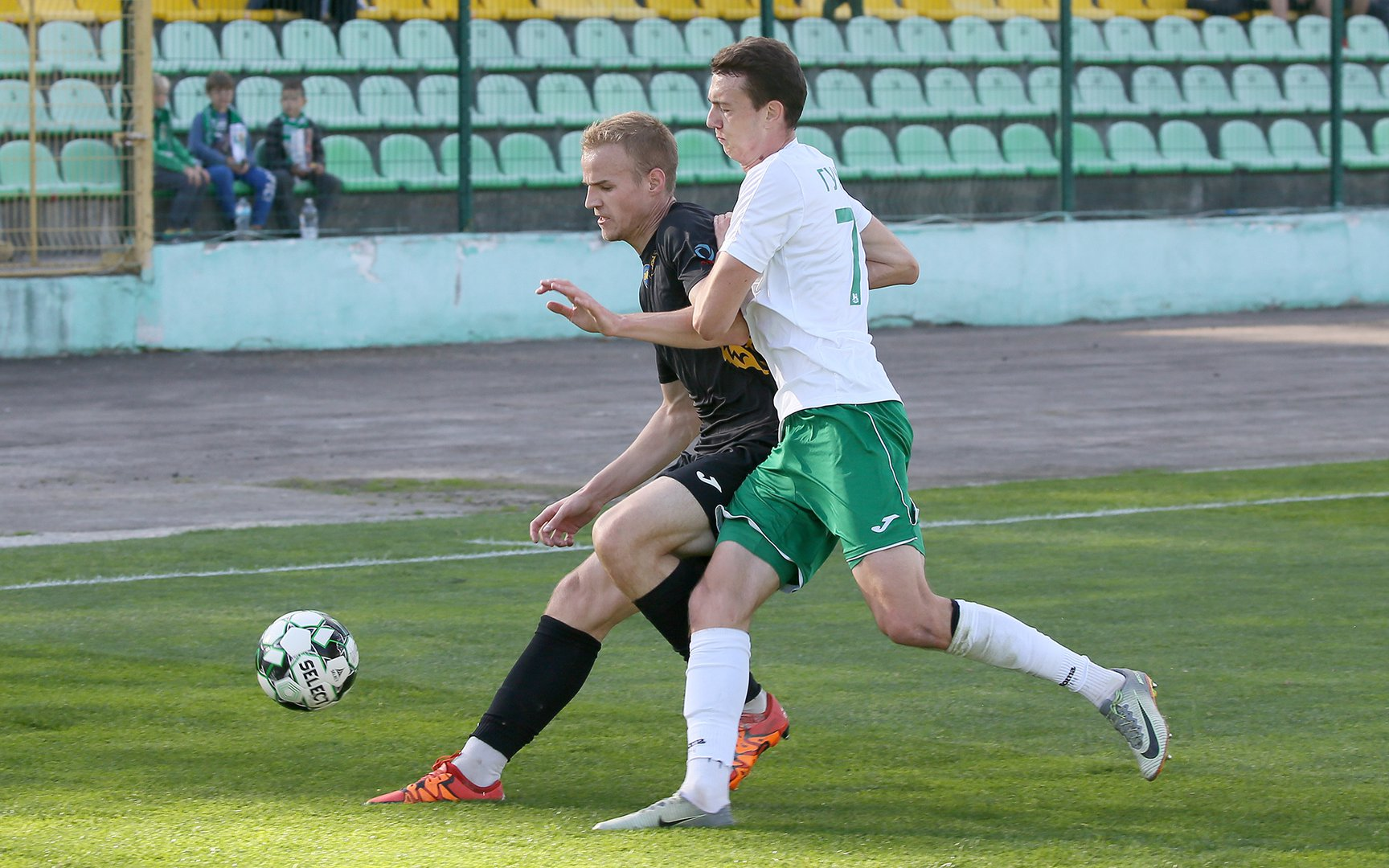
Oleksiy with Chernihiv

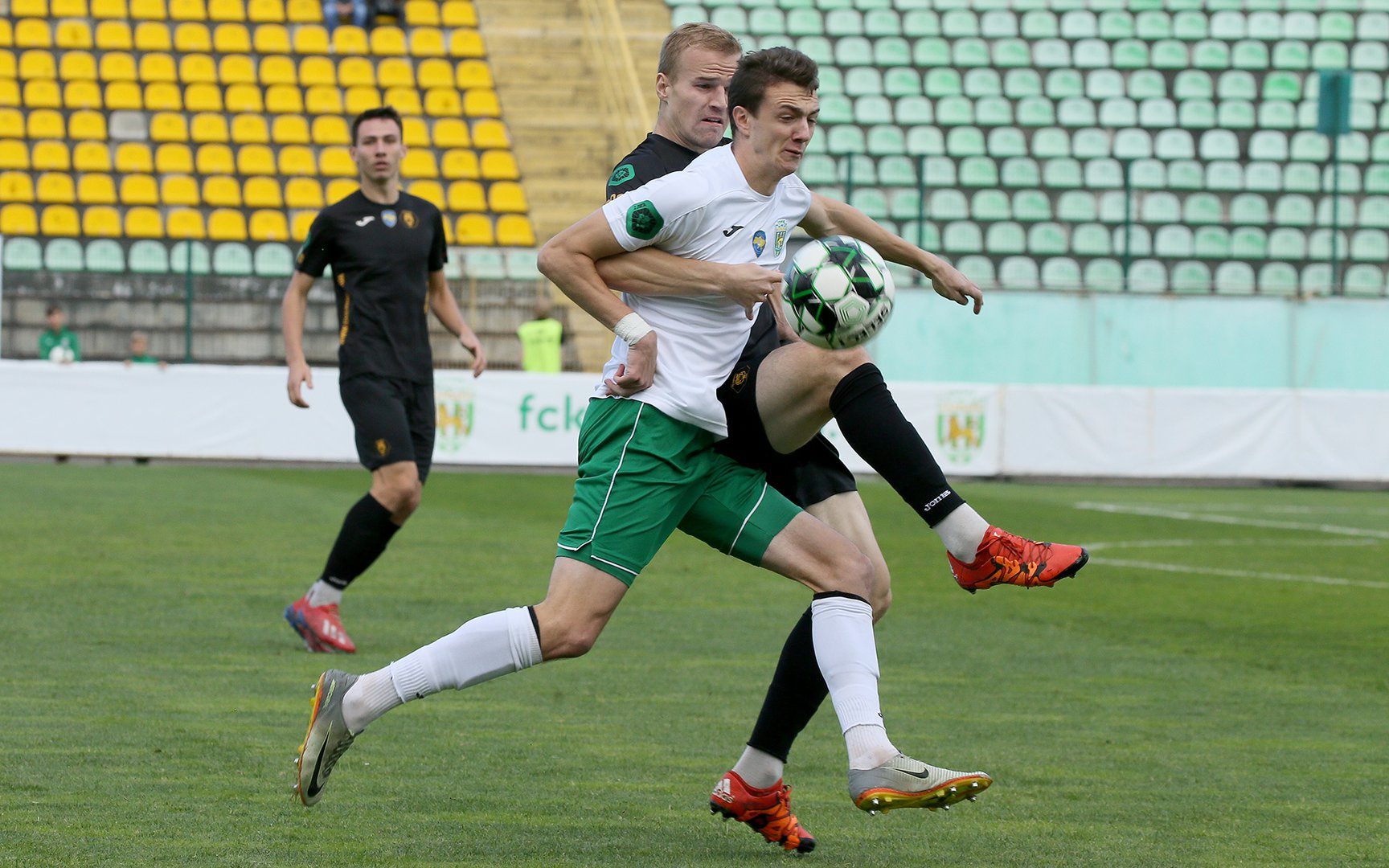
Oleksiy with Chernihiv

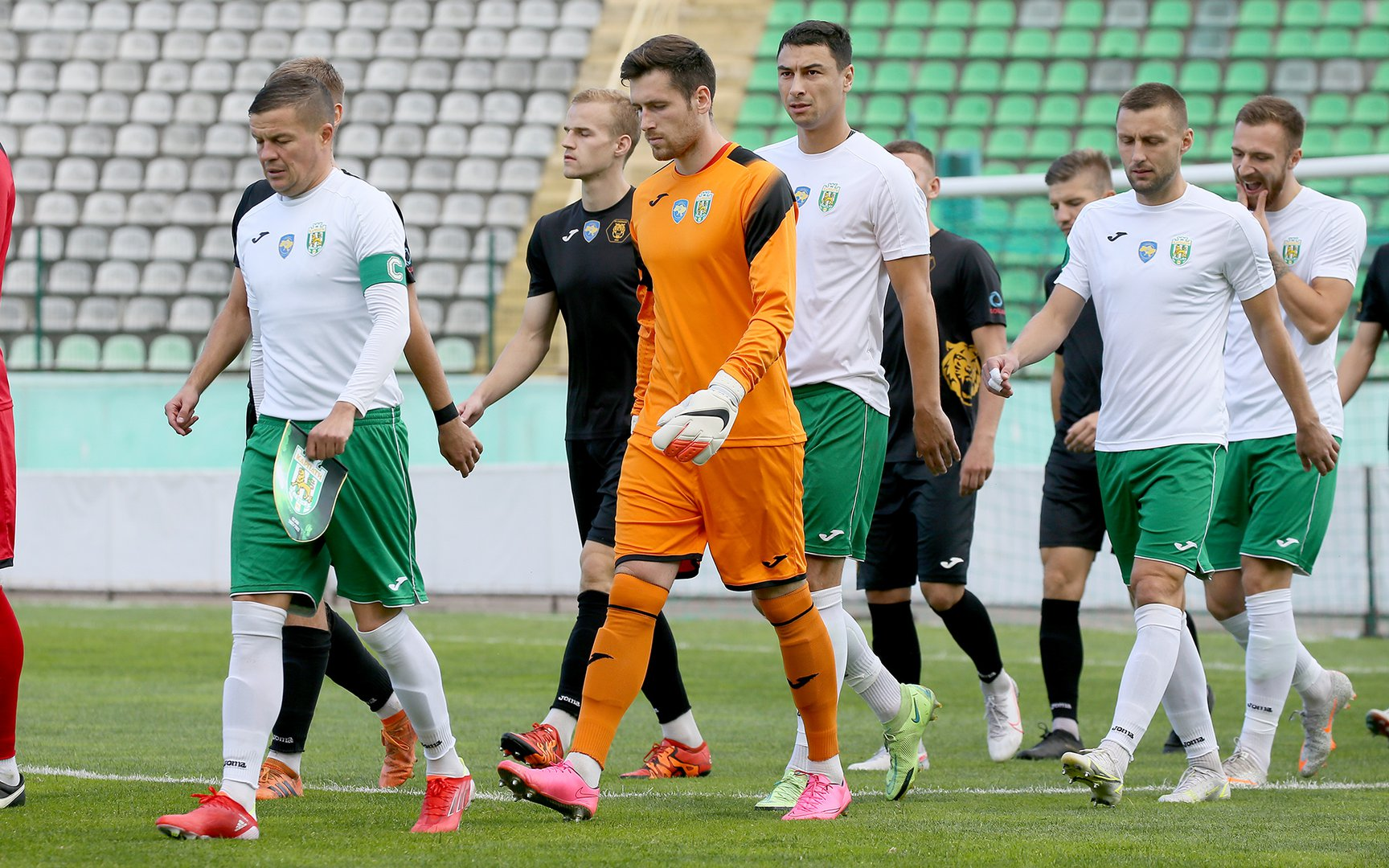
Oleksiy with Chernihiv
