= Kyrylo Kryvoborodenko =

Ukrainian footballer (born 1996)

Personal information
- Full name: Kyrylo Oleksandrovych Kryvoborodenko
- Date of birth: 9 August 1996 (age 30)
- Place of birth: Chernihiv, Ukraine
- Height: 1.80 m (5 ft 11 in)
- Position: Central midfielder

Youth career
- 2009–2011: Yunist Chernihiv
- 2012–2013: RVUFK Kyiv

Senior career*
Years	Team	Apps	(Gls)
2015	YuSB Chernihiv	8	(0)
2017–2024	Chernihiv	128	(14)
- * Club domestic league appearances and goals as of 8 January 2024

Kyrylo Oleksandrovych Kryvoborodenko (Ukrainian: Кирило Олександрович Кривобороденко; born 9 August 1996) is a Ukrainian footballer who plays as a central midfielder.

== Career ==
=== Yunist Chernihiv and RVUFK Kyiv ===
In 2009, Kryvoborodenko started his career with Yunist Chernihiv. From 2012 to 2013 he played for RVUFK Kyiv.

=== YuSB Chernihiv ===
In 2015 he moved to Chernihiv's youth system.

=== Chernihiv ===
In 2017 he moved to Chernihiv and won the 2019 Football Championship of Chernihiv Oblast. In 2020 the team was promoted to the Ukrainian Second League. On 24 October, he made his debut against Rubikon Kyiv. On 21 September 2021, he scored against Karpaty Halych at the Enerhetyk Stadium in Burshtyn. On 18 August 2021 he made his debut in the 2021–22 Ukrainian Cup against Chaika Petropavlivska Borshchahivka. On 27 August 2022 he made his debut in the Ukrainian First League against Skoruk Tomakivka at the Yunist Stadium in Chernihiv. During the first part of the 2024–25 season, he played 5 matches. In December 2024, he was released by the club after 11 years.

== Career statistics ==
As of match played 8 January 2025

Appearances and goals by club, season and competition
Club	Season	League			Cup		Europe		Other		Total	
Club	Season	Division	Apps	Goals	Apps	Goals	Apps	Goals	Apps	Goals	Apps	Goals
YuSB Chernihiv	2016	Chernihiv Oblast Football Federation	7	0	0	0	0	0	0	0	7	0
YuSB Chernihiv	2016–17	Chernihiv Oblast Football Federation	0	0	0	0	0	0	0	0	0	0
Chernihiv	2017–18	Chernihiv Oblast Football Federation	22	4	0	0	0	0	0	0	0	0
Chernihiv	2018–19	Chernihiv Oblast Football Federation	0	0	0	0	0	0	0	0	0	0
Chernihiv	2019–20	Chernihiv Oblast Football Federation	20	7	0	0	0	0	0	0	20	7
Chernihiv	2020–21	Ukrainian Second League	14	0	0	0	0	0	0	0	14	0
Chernihiv	2021–22	Ukrainian Second League	16	1	2	0	0	0	0	0	18	1
Chernihiv	2022–23	Ukrainian First League	19	0	0	0	0	0	0	0	19	0
Chernihiv	2023–24	Ukrainian First League	25	2	0	0	0	0	0	0	25	2
Chernihiv	2024–25	Ukrainian Second League	5	0	0	0	0	0	0	0	5	0
Career total			128	14	3	0	0	0	0	0	131	14

== Honours ==
Chernihiv

- Chernihiv Oblast Football Championship: 2019

Kudrivka

- Chernihiv Oblast Football Cupː 2026

Individual

- Top Scorer of Chernihiv on the season 2019–20 (7 goals)
