= Teymuraz Mchedlishvili =

Ukrainian footballer (born 1985)

Personal information
- Full name: Teymuraz Davidovich Mchedlishvili
- Date of birth: 18 March 1985 (age 41)
- Place of birth: Zaporizhzhia, Soviet Union (now Ukraine)
- Height: 1.85 m (6 ft 1 in)
- Position: Defender

Senior career*
Years	Team	Apps	(Gls)
2005–2006	Spartaki Tbilisi	30	(1)
2006–2007	Merani Tbilisi	40	(1)
2008–2009	Desna-2 Chernihiv	5	(0)
2009–2010	Yednist-2 Plysky	15	(0)
2011–2013	YSB Chernihiv	42	(4)
2013–2015	Avanhard Koryukivka	12	(0)
2015	YSB Chernihiv	12	(8)
2016–2017	Avanhard Koryukivka	7	(0)
2017–2021	Chernihiv	54	(3)

Managerial career
- 2021–: FC Chernihiv U13 (manager)
- * Club domestic league appearances and goals

Teymuraz Davidovich Mchedlishvili (Ukrainian: Теймураз Давидович Мчедлишвили; born 18 April 1985) is a Ukrainian former professional footballer who played as a defender.

== Career ==
In 2005 Mchedlishvili started his career at Spartaki Tbilisi. In 2006 he moved to Merani Tbilisi. In 2008, he moved to FC Desna-2 Chernihiv. In 2009 he moved to FC Yednist' Plysky. After bouncing around several amateur and lower-level sides, he signed with FC Chernihiv in 2017.

== After Retirement ==
In 2021 he was appointed as coach of the FC Chernihiv under-13 team.

== Outside of professional football ==
On 15 June 2025, he took parts in the match of Desna Chernihiv stars against the football stars of the Chernihiv's region at the Chernihiv Arena, with the specific goal of raising 1,000,000 hryvnias to support the public organization EVUM.

== Career statistics ==
=== By Club ===
As of match played 21 June 2021

Appearances and goals by club, season and competition
Club	Season	League			Cup		Europe		Other		Total	
Club	Season	Division	Apps	Goals	Apps	Goals	Apps	Goals	Apps	Goals	Apps	Goals
Spartaki Tbilisi	2005–06	Umaglesi Liga	26	1	0	0	0	0	0	0	26	1
Kolkheti Khobi	2006–07	Umaglesi Liga	6	0	0	0	0	0	0	0	6	0
Yednist' Plysky	2009	Ukrainian Amateur League	5	0	0	0	0	0	0	0	5	0
Desna-2 Chernihiv	2010	Chernihiv Oblast Championship	15	0	0	0	0	0	0	0	15	0
YSB Chernihiv	2011	Chernihiv Oblast Championship	0	0	1	1	0	0	0	0	1	1
YSB Chernihiv	2012	Ukrainian Amateur League	16	3	0	0	0	0	0	0	16	3
YSB Chernihiv	2013	Ukrainian Amateur League	26	1	0	0	0	0	0	0	26	1
Avangard Korukivka	2014	Chernihiv Oblast Championship	7	0	0	0	0	0	0	0	7	0
Avangard Korukivka	2015	Chernihiv Oblast Championship	5	0	0	0	0	0	0	0	5	0
YSB Chernihiv	2015–16	Chernihiv Oblast Championship	12	8	0	0	0	0	0	0	12	8
Avangard Korukivka	2016–17	Chernihiv Oblast Championship	7	0	0	0	0	0	0	0	7	0
FC Chernihiv	2017–18	Ukrainian Amateur League	14	0	0	0	0	0	0	0	14	0
FC Chernihiv	2019	Chernihiv Oblast Championship	0	0	0	0	0	0	0	0	0	0
FC Chernihiv	2019–20	Ukrainian Amateur League	19	2	0	0	0	0	0	0	19	2
FC Chernihiv	2020–21	Ukrainian Second League	21	1	0	0	0	0	0	0	21	1
Career total			179	16	1	1	0	0	0	0	180	17

== Honours ==
FC Chernihiv

- Chernihiv Oblast Football Championship: 2019
- Chernihiv Oblast Football Cup: 2012

FC Yednist' Plysky 2

- Ukrainian Football Amateur League: 2009

== See also ==
- Mchedlishvili
