= Mchedlishvili =

Mchedlishvili (მჭედლიშვილი) is a Georgian language patronymic surname literally meaning "blacksmith's son", and may refer to:

- Davit Mchedlishvili (born 1988), Georgian footballer
- Teymuraz Mchedlishvili (born 1985), Ukrainian footballer
- Mikheil Mchedlishvili (born 1979), Georgian chess grandmaster
- Teymuraz Mchedlishvili (born 1985), Ukrainian footballer
