= Dmytro Myronenko =

Ukrainian footballer (born 1996)

Personal information
- Full name: Dmytro Serhiyovych Myronenko
- Date of birth: 7 March 1996 (age 30)
- Place of birth: Chernihiv, Ukraine
- Height: 1.74 m (5 ft 9 in)
- Position: Midfielder

Team information
- Current team: Chernihiv
- Number: 7

Youth career
- 2013: Yunist Chernihiv

Senior career*
| Years | Team | Apps | (Gls) |
| 2013–2014 | Polissya Dobryanka | 14 | (0) |
| 2015 | YuSB Chernihiv | 12 | (1) |
| 2016–2017 | Avanhard Koryukivka | 14 | (0) |
| 2017– | Chernihiv | 175 | (19) |
- * Club domestic league appearances and goals as of 1 November 2026

Dmytro Serhiyovych Myronenko (Ukrainian: Дмитро Сергійович Мироненко; born 7 March 1996) is a Ukrainian professional footballer who plays as a midfielder for FC Chernihiv in the Ukrainian First League.

== Career ==
=== Early career ===
Myronenko started his career at amateur club Yunist Chernihiv in 2013, jumping around to several other amateur clubs over the next two years.

=== FC Chernihiv ===
In 2015 he moved to FC Chernihiv's youth side, with whom he played 15 matches and scored one goal. In 2017 he moved to Chernihiv's senior side, where he won the Chernihiv Oblast Football Championship in 2019. In 2020 he made his senior debut in the 2020–21 Ukrainian Second League against Rubikon Kyiv. On 14 April 2021 he scored a goal by free kick against FC Volyn-2 Lutsk. On 18 August he played in the 2021–22 Ukrainian Cup against Chaika Petropavlivska Borshchahivka. On 13 November he scored against Rubikon Kyiv in the 2021–22 Ukrainian Second League at the Chernihiv Arena.

On 17 September 2022, he scored against Metalurh Zaporizhzhia at the Slavutych-Arena in Zaporizhzhia becoming the first player in the history of the club to score in the Ukrainian First League. On 6 February 2026, he extend his contract with the club for two years.

== Career statistics ==
As of match played 1 November 2026

Appearances and goals by club, season and competition
| Club | Season | League | | | Cup | | Europe | | Other | | Total | |
| Club | Season | Division | Apps | Goals | Apps | Goals | Apps | Goals | Apps | Goals | Apps | Goals |
|---|---|---|---|---|---|---|---|---|---|---|---|---|
| YuSB Chernihiv | 2015 | Chernihiv Oblast League | 12 | 1 | 0 | 0 | 0 | 0 | 0 | 0 | 12 | 1 |
| Koryukivka | 2016 | Chernihiv Oblast League | 14 | 0 | 0 | 0 | 0 | 0 | 0 | 0 | 14 | 0 |
| Chernihiv | 2016–17 | Chernihiv Oblast League | 22 | 5 | 0 | 0 | 0 | 0 | 0 | 0 | 22 | 5 |
| Chernihiv | 2017–18 | Ukrainian Amateur League | 19 | 3 | 0 | 0 | 0 | 0 | 0 | 0 | 19 | 3 |
| Chernihiv | 2018–19 | Chernihiv Oblast League | 0 | 0 | 0 | 0 | 0 | 0 | 0 | 0 | 0 | 0 |
| Chernihiv | 2019–20 | Chernihiv Oblast League | 19 | 3 | 0 | 0 | 0 | 0 | 0 | 0 | 19 | 3 |
| Chernihiv | 2020–21 | Ukrainian Second League | 19 | 2 | 0 | 0 | 0 | 0 | 0 | 0 | 19 | 2 |
| Chernihiv | 2021–22 | Ukrainian Second League | 17 | 1 | 2 | 0 | 0 | 0 | 0 | 0 | 19 | 1 |
| Chernihiv | 2022–23 | Ukrainian First League | 21 | 2 | 0 | 0 | 0 | 0 | 0 | 0 | 21 | 2 |
| Chernihiv | 2023–24 | Ukrainian First League | 15 | 1 | 0 | 0 | 0 | 0 | 0 | 0 | 15 | 1 |
| Chernihiv | 2024–25 | Ukrainian Second League | 12 | 1 | 2 | 0 | 0 | 0 | 1 | 0 | 15 | 1 |
| Chernihiv | 2025–26 | Ukrainian First League | 25 | 1 | 4 | 0 | 0 | 0 | 0 | 0 | 29 | 1 |
| Chernihiv | 2026–27 | Ukrainian First League | 6 | 0 | 1 | 0 | 0 | 0 | 0 | 0 | 7 | 0 |
| Career total | | | 201 | 20 | 9 | 0 | 0 | 0 | 1 | 0 | 211 | 20 |

== Honours ==
Chernihiv

- Chernihiv Oblast Football Championship: 2019
- Ukrainian Cup runner-up: 2025–26

Individual

- Honoured Master of Sport of Ukraine
