= Ruslan Dedukh =

Ukrainian footballer (born 1998)

Personal information
- Full name: Ruslan Richardovych Dedukh
- Date of birth: 13 April 1998 (age 28)
- Place of birth: Chernihiv, Ukraine
- Height: 1.77 m (5 ft 10 in)
- Position: Midfielder

Team information
- Current team: Viktoriya Sumy
- Number: 18

Youth career
- 2015: Yunist Chernihiv
- 2015–2016: Vorskla Poltava

Senior career*
Years	Team	Apps	(Gls)
2016–2017	Lviv	7	(0)
2017–2018	Chernihiv	26	(12)
2018–2019	Kalush	16	(1)
2019–2020	Nyva Ternopil	25	(2)
2020	Chernihiv	6	(0)
2021	Horishni Plavni	11	(0)
2021–2022	Nyva Ternopil	29	(2)
2023–2026	Livyi Bereh Kyiv	57	(8)
2026	Livyi Bereh-2 Kyiv	5	(1)
2026–	Viktoriya Sumy	11	(3)
- * Club domestic league appearances and goals as of 21 November 2026

Ruslan Richardovych Dedukh (Ukrainian: Руслан Річардович Дедух; born 13 April 1998) is a Ukrainian footballer who plays as a midfielder.

== Career ==
=== Yunist Chernihiv and Vorskla Poltava U-19 ===
Born in Chernihiv, Dedukh started to play for the youth team of Yunist Chernihiv, then he moved Vorskla Poltava U-19 in the 2015–16 season, where he played 19 matches and he scored two goals during the match against FC Karpaty Lviv U-19.

=== FC Kalush ===
In 2018 Dedukh started to play for FC Kalush a team from Kalush, Ivano-Frankivsk Oblast. and in the season 2019–20 with the team he got second and was promoted to Ukrainian First League.

=== FC Chernihiv ===
In summer 2020, Dedukh moved to FC Chernihiv in the Ukrainian Second League. On 24 October, he made his debut with his new team against FC Uzhhorod in the season 2020–21 Ukrainian Second League season.

=== Hirnyk-Sport Horishni Plavni ===
In January 2021, he signed with Hirnyk-Sport Horishni Plavni in the Ukrainian First League, making his debut against Prykarpattia Ivano-Frankivsk on 12 March.

=== Nyva Ternopil ===
In summer 2021, he moved to Nyva Ternopil of the Ukrainian First League. On 25 July he made his debut against Polissya Zhytomyr. On 27 November, he scored his first league goal against Kramatorsk. In December 2022 his contract was terminated with mutual consent. In February 2023, Livyi Bereh Kyiv showed interest to the player.

=== Livyi Bereh Kyiv ===
In July 2023 he moved to Livyi Bereh Kyiv in Ukrainian First League. Ruslan with the club unexpectedly promoted to the Ukrainian Premier League. On 1 September 2024, he scored his first goal in Ukrainian Premier League against Veres Rivne at vanhard Stadium in Rivne. On 7 December 2024, he scored two goals against LNZ Cherkasy at the Arena Livyi Bereh. On 15 July 2026 his contract was expired and he was released by mutual consent.

=== Viktoriya Sumy ===
On 8 September 2026, he signed for Viktoriya Sumy in Ukrainian First League. On 1 November 2026, he scored twice against Poltava at the Kuts Stadium in Trostyanets. Due to his performance in the match against Poltava, he was included in the Best XI of Round 14 of the 2026–27 Ukrainian First League.

== Career statistics ==
=== Club ===
As of match played 21 November 2026

Appearances and goals by club, season and competition
Club	Season	League			Cup		Europe		Other		Total	
Club	Season	Division	Apps	Goals	Apps	Goals	Apps	Goals	Apps	Goals	Apps	Goals
Lviv	2016–17	Ukrainian Football Amateur League	7	0	0	0	0	0	0	0	7	0
Chernihiv	2017–18	Ukrainian Football Amateur League	26	11	0	0	0	0	0	0	26	11
Kalush	2017–18	Ukrainian Football Amateur League	5	0	0	0	0	0	0	0	5	0
Kalush	2018–19	Ukrainian Second League	12	1	3	0	0	0	0	0	15	1
Nyva Ternopil	2019–20	Ukrainian Second League	15	1	0	0	0	0	0	0	15	1
Chernihiv	2020–21	Ukrainian Second League	6	0	0	0	0	0	0	0	6	0
Horishni Plavni	2020–21	Ukrainian First League	11	0	0	0	0	0	0	0	11	0
Nyva Ternopil	2021–22	Ukrainian First League	18	1	2	0	0	0	0	0	20	1
Nyva Ternopil	2022–23	Ukrainian First League	11	1	0	0	0	0	0	0	11	1
Livyi Bereh Kyiv	2023–24	Ukrainian First League	27	5	2	0	0	0	0	0	29	5
Livyi Bereh Kyiv	2024–25	Ukrainian Premier League	25	3	1	0	0	0	2	0	28	3
Livyi Bereh Kyiv	2025–26	Ukrainian First League	7	0	1	0	0	0	0	0	8	0
Livyi Bereh-2 Kyiv	2025–26	Ukrainian Second League	5	1	0	0	0	0	0	0	5	1
Viktoriya Sumy	2026–27	Ukrainian First League	11	3	1	0	0	0	0	0	12	3
Career total			185	27	10	0	0	0	2	0	196	27

== Honours ==
Livyi Bereh Kyiv

- PFL Winter Cup: 2023

Nyva Ternopil

- Ukrainian Second League: 2019–20

FC Chernihiv

- Chernihiv Oblast Football Championship: 2018
