= Andriy Makarenko =

Ukrainian footballer (born 1996)

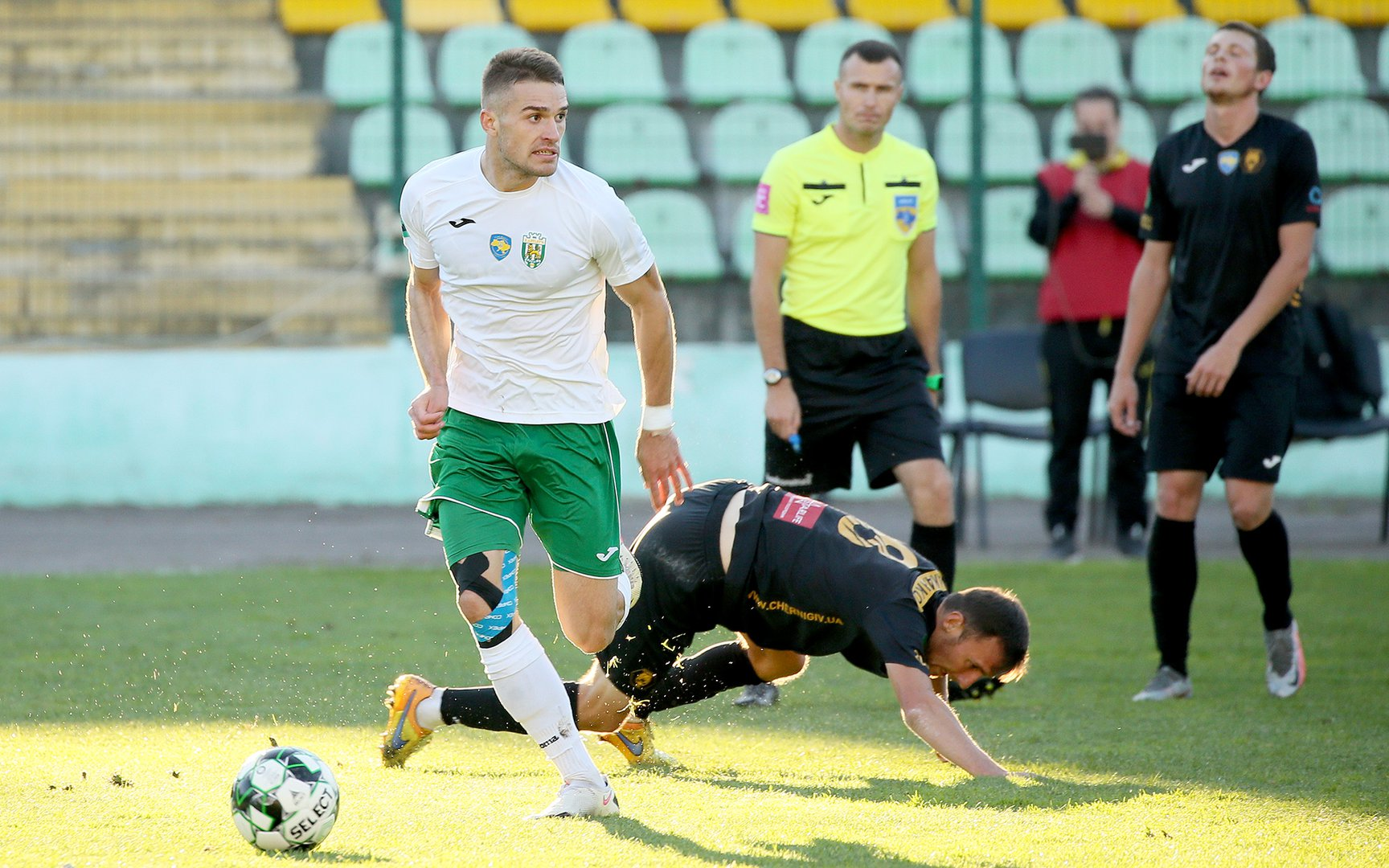

Personal information
- Full name: Andriy Oleksandrovych Makarenko
- Date of birth: 13 December 1996 (age 29)
- Place of birth: Chernihiv, Ukraine
- Height: 1.85 m (6 ft 1 in)
- Position: Midfielder

Team information
- Current team: Kalynivka
- Number: 25

Youth career
- 2015: Yunist Chernihiv
- 2015–2017: Polissya Dobryanka

Senior career*
Years	Team	Apps	(Gls)
2017–2025	Chernihiv	56	(1)
2026–	Kalynivka	0	(0)
- * Club domestic league appearances and goals as of 21 August 2026

Andriy Oleksandrovych Makarenko (Ukrainian: Андрій Олександрович Макаренко; born 13 December 1996) is a Ukrainian professional footballer who plays as a midfielder.

== Early career ==
Makarenko started his career in 2015 with Yunist Chernihiv before moving to Polissya Dobryanka in 2016.

== Career ==
=== FC Chernihiv ===
In 2017 he moved to YSB Chernihiv, where he played for two season. In the meantime, the club changed its name to FC Chernihiv and was promoted to the Ukrainian Second League. On 6 September 2020, he made his debut with the club against Rubikon Kyiv in the 2020–21 Ukrainian Second League season. On 18 August 2021 he made his debut in the 2021–22 Ukrainian Cup against Chaika Petropavlivska Borshchahivka. In December 2024 his contract with the club ended and he was released by the club after 7 years.

== Career statistics ==
=== Club ===
As of match played 19 December 2024

Appearances and goals by club, season and competition
Club	Season	League			Cup		Europe		Other		Total	
Club	Season	Division	Apps	Goals	Apps	Goals	Apps	Goals	Apps	Goals	Apps	Goals
Chernihiv	2019–20	Chernihiv Oblast Football Federation	12	1	0	0	0	0	0	0	12	1
Chernihiv	2020–21	Ukrainian Second League	15	0	0	0	0	0	0	0	15	0
Chernihiv	2021–22	Ukrainian Second League	11	0	2	0	0	0	0	0	13	0
Chernihiv	2022–23	Ukrainian First League	9	0	0	0	0	0	0	0	9	0
Chernihiv	2023–24	Ukrainian First League	9	0	0	0	0	0	0	0	9	0
Career total			56	1	2	0	0	0	0	0	58	1
