= Anatoliy Kokhanovskyi =

Ukrainian footballer (born 1995)

Personal information
- Full name: Anatoliy Yuriyovych Kokhanovskyi
- Date of birth: 5 October 1995 (age 31)
- Place of birth: Chernihiv, Ukraine
- Height: 1.87 m (6 ft 2 in)
- Position: Striker

Youth career
- 2012: Yunist Chernihiv

Senior career*
Years	Team	Apps	(Gls)
2017–2022	Chernihiv	44	(13)
- * Club domestic league appearances and goals as of 13 November 2022

Anatoliy Yuriyovych Kokhanovskyi (Ukrainian: Анатолій Юрійович Кохановський; born 5 October 1995) is a Ukrainian professional footballer who plays as a striker.

== Career ==
=== FC Chernihiv ===
Anatoliy Kokhanovskyi started his career in Yunist Chernihiv in 2012. In 2017 he moved to FC Chernihiv where he won the Chernihiv Oblast Football Championship in 2018 and in 2019. In 2020 he was promoted with the team to the Ukrainian Second League. On 11 June 2021 he scored against Karpaty Lviv in the last match of the 2020–21 season.

== Career statistics ==
=== Club ===
As of match played 25 August 2022

Appearances and goals by club, season and competition
Club	Season	League			Cup		Europe		Other		Total	
Club	Season	Division	Apps	Goals	Apps	Goals	Apps	Goals	Apps	Goals	Apps	Goals
Chernihiv	2017	Chernihiv Oblast Football Federation	18	11	0	0	0	0	0	0	18	11
Chernihiv	2017–18	Ukrainian Football Amateur League	0	0	0	0	0	0	0	0	0	0
Chernihiv	2019	Chernihiv Oblast Football Federation	0	0	0	0	0	0	0	0	0	0
Chernihiv	2019–20	Ukrainian Football Amateur League	0	0	0	0	0	0	0	0	0	0
Chernihiv	2020–21	Ukrainian Second League	24	2	0	0	0	0	0	0	24	2
Chernihiv	2021–22	Ukrainian Second League	2	0	0	0	0	0	0	0	2	0
Career total			44	13	0	0	0	0	0	0	44	13

== Honours ==
FC Chernihiv

- Chernihiv Oblast Football Championship: 2019
