= 2020 Football Championship of Chernihiv Oblast =

Football Championship of Chernihiv Oblast
- Season: 2020

The 2020 Football Championship of Chernihiv Oblast is the 73rd season of the competition.

== Northern Zone ==
Pos	Team	Pld	W	D	L	GF	GA	GD	Pts	Qualification or relegation
1	Ahrodim Bakhmach	10	9	1	0	38	8	+30	28	Qualified to Vyshcha Liha
2	Mena	10	5	3	2	17	13	+4	18	Qualified to Vyshcha Liha
3	Borzna-Zmina	10	4	3	3	22	15	+7	15	Qualified to Vyshcha Liha
4	Horodnia	10	3	1	6	16	30	−14	10	Qualified to Persha Liha
5	Favoryt Koriukivka	10	2	3	5	22	23	−1	9	Qualified to Persha Liha
6	Korop	10	1	1	8	5	31	−26	4	Qualified to Persha Liha

Source: "Чемпіонат області (ПІВНІЧНА ЗОНА)". Chernihiv Oblast Association of Football. 4 July 2020. Archived from the original on 2020-11-17.

== Southern Zone ==
Pos	Team	Pld	W	D	L	GF	GA	GD	Pts	Qualification or relegation
1	Nizhyn	10	8	1	1	31	7	+24	25	Qualified to Vyshcha Liha
2	Prohres Ostapivka	10	5	2	3	16	14	+2	17	Qualified to Vyshcha Liha
3	Kremin-Harantbud Dmytrivka	10	4	3	3	15	12	+3	15	Qualified to Vyshcha Liha
4	Kurin	10	3	2	5	15	20	−5	11	Qualified to Persha Liha
5	Krystal Nosivka	10	2	2	6	15	32	−17	8	Qualified to Persha Liha
6	Olimpik Pryluky	10	0	6	4	12	19	−7	6	Qualified to Persha Liha

Source: "Чемпіонат області (ПІВДЕННА ЗОНА)". Chernihiv Oblast Association of Football. 4 July 2020. Archived from the original on 2020-11-17.

== Second stage ==
In the second stage teams played the three from opposite zone only home and away, while results of teams from their home zone was grandfathered from the first stage.

== Vyshcha Liha ==
Pos	Team	Pld	W	D	L	GF	GA	GD	Pts	Qualification or relegation
1	Ahrodim Bakhmach (C)	10	7	2	1	15	6	+9	23	Champion
2	Nizhyn	10	7	0	3	30	7	+23	21	
3	Borzna-Zmina	10	5	2	3	19	20	−1	17	
4	Mena	10	4	1	5	11	17	−6	13	
5	Kremin-Harantbud Dmytrivka	10	2	2	6	7	16	−9	8	
6	Prohres Ostapivka	10	1	1	8	4	20	−16	4	

Source: "Чемпіонат Чернігівської області з футболу серед чоловічих команд ВИЩОЇ ЛІГИ 2020 року". Chernihiv Oblast Association of Football. Archived from the original on 2020-11-17.
(C) Champions

== Persha Liha ==
Pos	Team	Pld	W	D	L	GF	GA	GD	Pts	Qualification or relegation
1	Kurin	8	5	1	2	23	15	+8	16	
2	Olimpik Pryluky	8	4	3	1	24	10	+14	15	
3	Krystal Nosivka	8	4	2	2	23	15	+8	14	
4	Favoryt Koriukivka	8	3	0	5	19	23	−4	9	
5	Horodnia	8	1	0	7	3	29	−26	3	
–	Korop (Note: The Korop's record was annulled, in the table shows record from previous stage with their home zone teams.)	4	1	1	2	5	13	−8	4	withdrew

Source: "Чемпіонат Чернігівської області з футболу серед чоловічих команд ПЕРШОЇ ЛІГИ 2020 року". Chernihiv Oblast Association of Football. Archived from the original on 2020-11-17.
