= FC Papirnyk Malyn =

Papirnyk
- Full name: FC Papirnyk Malyn
- Founded: 1923
- Dissolved: 2000; 25 years ago
- Ground: Malyn
- League: Ukrainian Second League

FC Papirnyk Malyn was a Ukrainian football team based in Malyn, Zhytomyr Oblast.

== Overview ==
The club participated in the Ukrainian Second League Group A for four seasons (1997–2000). Afterwards the club was forced to withdraw its team from the professional competitions due to various reasons, but mainly the new regulations of the League.

The existence of a team from a local paper factory in Malyn is traced to 1923. Created in 1937, Zhytomyr Oblast did not hold its regional football competitions before the World War II (Nazi-Soviet war), therefore the factory team played friendlies with teams from other neighboring cities Korosten, Radomyshl, Korostyshiv and others. In 1937 the Malyn team even made a voyage to the Russian city of Kalinin (the Soviet name for Tver) where it played a few friendlies as well. At that time, traveling across the Soviet Union was very limited, and even such a voyage made a significant impression on the new athletes. In the 1930s the factory team also had its junior team, which carried the name "Maliutka".

== League and cup history ==
Season	Div.	Pos.	Pl.	W	D	L	GS	GA	P	Domestic Cup	Europe	Notes

== Notable players ==
- Vadym Postovoy
