= Oleksandr Konopko =

Ukrainian footballer (born 1964)

Personal information
- Full name: Oleksandr Olegovich Konopko
- Date of birth: 12 April 1990 (age 36)
- Place of birth: Chernihiv, Ukrainian SSR, Soviet Union
- Height: 1.85 m (6 ft 1 in)
- Position: Defender

Youth career
- 2007: SDYuShOR Desna

Senior career*
Years	Team	Apps	(Gls)
2007–2009	Desna-2 Chernihiv	7	(0)
2010–2021	Chernihiv	80	(9)
- * Club domestic league appearances and goals

Oleksandr Olegovich Konopko (Ukrainian: Олександр Олегович Конопко; born 21 February 1964) is a former Ukrainian professional footballer who played as a defender.

== Playing career ==
In 2007 he started his career FC Desna-2 Chernihiv, then in 2010 he moved to FC Chernihiv. With the club in 2012 won the Chernihiv Oblast Football Cup and in 2019 won the Chernihiv Oblast Football Championship. In 2020 was granted to participate to the Ukrainian Second League. On 6 September 2020 he scored his first goal in the season 2020-21 against Rubikon Kyiv In summer 2021 he left the FC Chernihiv after more than ten years in the club of Chernihiv.

== Honours ==
FC Chernihiv

- Chernihiv Oblast Football Championship: 2019
- Chernihiv Oblast Football Cup: 2012
