= Mykola Vlaev =

Ukrainian footballer (born 1984)

Personal information
- Full name: Влаєв Іванович Микола
- Date of birth: 21 January 1984 (age 42)
- Place of birth: Ukraine
- Height: 1.74 m (5 ft 9 in)
- Position: Midfielder

Youth career
- Dynamo Kyiv

Senior career*
Years	Team	Apps	(Gls)
1999–2003	Dynamo-3 Kyiv	18	(0)
2003–2006	CSKA Kyiv	38	(0)
2006–2008	Mykolaiv	9	(0)
2007–2008	Stal Kamianske	8	(0)
2008–2011	Yednist Plysky	42	(3)
2010–2011	Dnister Ovidiopol	10	(0)
2011	FC Yednist-2 Plysky	1	(0)
2012–2015	Dinaz Vyshhorod	19	(1)
2016–2017	Desna Pohreby	30	(0)
2017–2018	Yednist Plysky	17	(6)
2017	Chernihiv	6	(0)
2019–2020	Desna Pohreby	12	(2)
- * Club domestic league appearances and goals as of 16 November 2022

Mykola Vlaev (Ukrainian: Влаєв Іванович Микола; born 21 January 1984) is a Ukrainian professional footballer who plays as a midfielder.

== Playing career ==
Vlaev is a product of Dynamo Kyiv, starting with Dynamo-3 Kyiv where he played 18 matches. Beginning in 2003, he began a career that saw him play for a series of lower-level and amateur clubs, ranging from CSKA Kyiv to Dnister Ovidiopol and FC Chernihiv. He last played for Desna Pohreby in 2020.

== Honours ==
Desna Pohreby

- Kyiv Region Cup: 2017
- Kyiv Oblast Football Federation: Runner-up 2016

Dinaz Vyshhorod

- Football cup of Kyiv Oblast: 2012, 2015

Yednist Plysky

- Ukrainian Amateur Cup: Runner-up 2013
