= Ihor Nahornyi =

Ukrainian footballer

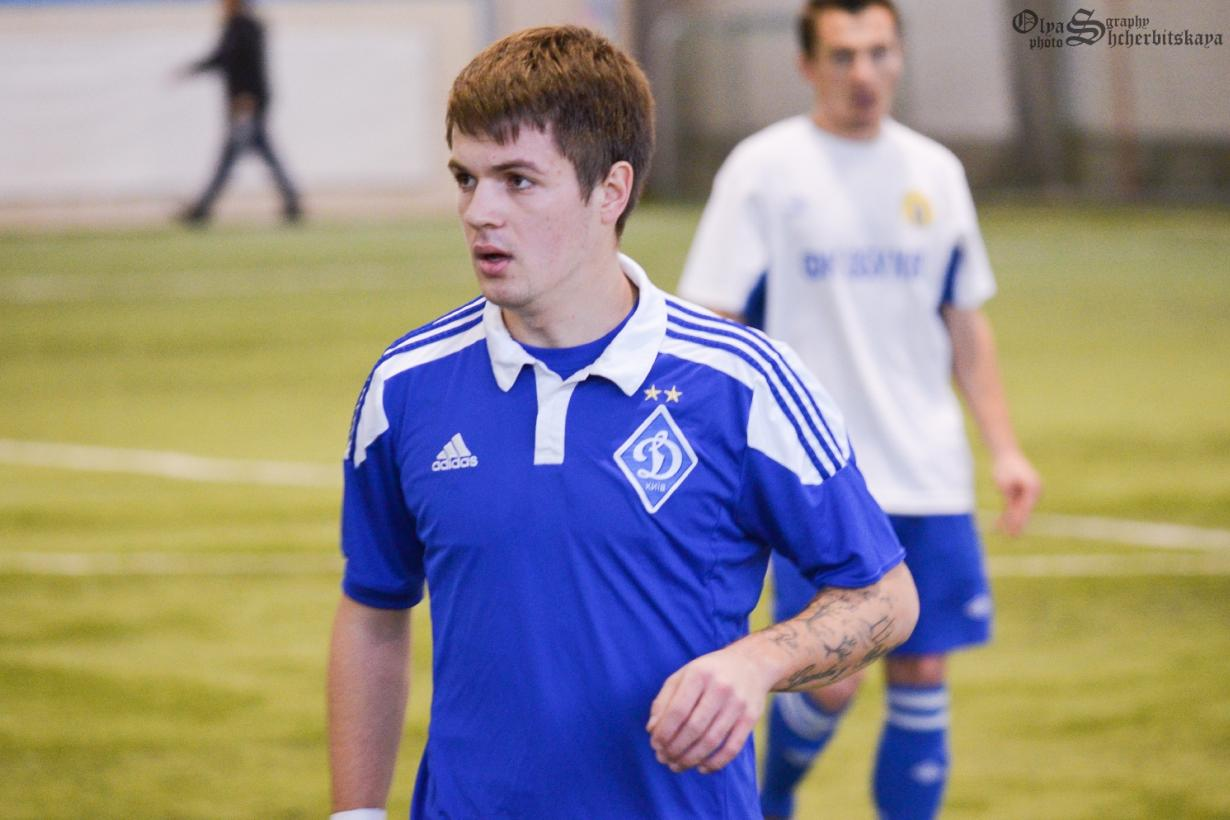

Personal information
- Full name: Ihor Oleksiyovych Nahornyi
- Date of birth: 22 May 1995 (age 31)
- Place of birth: Leninske, Cherkasy Oblast, Ukraine
- Height: 1.74 m (5 ft 9 in)
- Position: Left-back

Team information
- Current team: Wisłok Wiśniowa
- Number: 3

Youth career
- 2007–2011: Molod Poltava
- 2011–2012: Dynamo Kyiv

Senior career*
Years	Team	Apps	(Gls)
2012–2016	Dynamo Kyiv	0	(0)
2015–2016	→ Dynamo-2 Kyiv	10	(0)
2016–2017	Arsenal-Kyivshchyna Bila Tserkva	5	(1)
2017	Formacja Port 2000 Mostki	14	(8)
2017–2018	Arsenal-Kyivshchyna Bila Tserkva	14	(2)
2018	MKP Wołów	6	(3)
2018–2019	Stal Brzeg	12	(1)
2019–2020	Carina Gubin	29	(3)
2020	Probiy Horodenka (amateurs)	5	(0)
2020	Bukovyna Chernivtsi	7	(1)
2021	Karpaty Halych	12	(1)
2021–2022	Ahrobiznes Volochysk	19	(0)
2022–2024	Cosmos Nowotaniec	54	(6)
2024–	Wisłok Wiśniowa	31	(0)
- * Club domestic league appearances and goals as of 22:24, 24 June 2025 (UTC)

Ihor Oleksiyovych Nahornyi (Ukrainian: Ігор Олексійович Нагорний; born 22 May 1995) is a Ukrainian professional footballer who plays as a left-back for Polish club Wisłok Wiśniowa.

== Honours ==
Cosmos Nowotaniec

- IV liga Subcarpathia: 2022–23
- Polish Cup (Krosno regionals): 2022–23
