= Anatoliy Tymofeyev =

Ukrainian footballer (born 1992)

Personal information
- Full name: Anatoliy Serhiyovych Tymofeyev
- Date of birth: 19 April 1992 (age 34)
- Place of birth: Kyiv, Ukraine
- Height: 1.96 m (6 ft 5 in)
- Position: Goalkeeper

Youth career
- 2005–2007: FC Vidradnyi Kyiv

Senior career*
Years	Team	Apps	(Gls)
2009–2013	Dynamo Kyiv	0	(0)
2013	→ Dynamo-2 Kyiv	11	(0)
2014–2016	Naftovyk-Ukrnafta Okhtyrka	37	(0)
2016–2017	Dinamo Batumi	33	(0)
2018	Smolevichi	23	(0)
2020	Cherkashchyna	6	(0)
2020–2021	Chernihiv	3	(0)
2021	SC Poltava	9	(0)
2021	Polissya Zhytomyr	0	(0)
2023–2024	Olimpiya Savyntsi	0	(0)
- * Club domestic league appearances and goals as of 14 January 2025

Anatoliy Serhiyovych Tymofeyev (Ukrainian: Анатолій Сергійович Тимофєєв; born 19 April 1992) is a Ukrainian professional footballer who plays as a goalkeeper.

== Career ==
Tymofeyev's first professional club was FC Dynamo Kyiv, but he played only for the reserve team FC Dynamo-2 Kyiv in the Ukrainian First League. He made his professional debut on 20 July 2013, in a home match against FC Oleksandriya. He then signed with FC Naftovyk-Ukrnafta Okhtyrka before moving to Georgian side FC Dinamo Batumi in July 2016, where he won the 2016 Umaglesi Liga. In June 2020, he moved to Cherkashchyna in the Ukrainian First League, where he played in a total of 11 matches.

=== FC Chernihiv ===
On 23 October 2020, Tymofeyev moved to FC Chernihiv in the Ukrainian Second League. The next day, he made his debut for the side against FC Uzhhorod.

=== SC Poltava ===
In 2021 he moved to SC Poltava in Ukrainian Amateur Football Championship, where he played 9 matches, helping the club earn promotion to the Ukrainian Second League.

=== Polissya Zhytomyr ===
On 1 July 2021 he moved to Polissya Zhytomyr in the Ukrainian First League.

== Career statistics ==
=== Club ===
As of match played 26 December 2024

Appearances and goals by club, season and competition
Club	Season	League			Cup		Europe		Other		Total	
Club	Season	Division	Apps	Goals	Apps	Goals	Apps	Goals	Apps	Goals	Apps	Goals
Dynamo-2 Kyiv	2013–14	Ukrainian Premier League	11	0	0	0	0	0	0	0	11	0
Naftovyk Okhtyrka	2014–15	Ukrainian First League	18	0	3	0	0	0	0	0	21	0
Naftovyk Okhtyrka	2015–16	Ukrainian Premier League	14	0	2	0	0	0	0	0	16	0
Dinamo Batumi	2016	Umaglesi Liga	24	0	1	0	0	0	0	0	15	0
Dinamo Batumi	2017	Umaglesi Liga	13	0	2	0	2 (Note: two appearances in 2017–18 UEFA Europa League Second qualifying round)	0	0	0	17	0
Smolevichi	2018	Belarusian Premier League	24	0	0	0	0	0	0	0	24	0
Cherkashchyna	2019–20	Ukrainian First League	6	0	0	0	0	0	0	0	6	0
Chernihiv	2020–21	Ukrainian Second League	3	0	0	0	0	0	0	0	3	0
SC Poltava	2020–21	Ukrainian Football Amateur League	9	0	0	0	0	0	0	0	9	0
Polissya Zhytomyr	2021–22	Ukrainian First League	0	0	0	0	0	0	0	0	0	0
Olimpiya Savyntsi	2022–23	Ukrainian Football Amateur League	0	0	0	0	0	0	0	0	0	0
Olimpiya Savyntsi	2023–24	Ukrainian Football Amateur League	0	0	1	0	0	0	0	0	1	0
Career total			122	0	10	0	2	0	2	0	134	0

== Honours ==
Olympia Savyntsi

- Poltava Oblast championship: (1) 2023
- Poltava Oblast Cup (3) 2022, 2023, 2024
- Poltava Oblast Super Cup (2): 2022, 2023,
- Ukrainian Amateur Cup Runners-up: 2022–23

Dinamo Batumi

- Umaglesi Liga: 2016

Dynamo Kyiv

- Ukrainian Super Cup: 2011
- Ukrainian Premier League: Runners-up 2011–12
