= Oleh Okhrimenko =

Ukrainian footballer (born 1993)

Personal information
- Full name: Oleh Vasylyovych Okhrimenko
- Date of birth: 24 July 1993 (age 33)
- Place of birth: Nizhyn, Ukraine
- Height: 1.87 m (6 ft 2 in)
- Position: Defender

Team information
- Current team: Narew Ostrołęka
- Number: 3

Youth career
- 2009: Yunist Chernihiv

Senior career*
Years	Team	Apps	(Gls)
2012	Polissya Dobryanka	16	(2)
2013	Nizhyn	8	(0)
2014	Frunzenets Nizhyn	4	(0)
2015	YSB Chernihiv	9	(0)
2016–2017	Yednist Plysky	17	(4)
2017–2018	Polissya Zhytomyr	13	(0)
2020–	Narew Ostrołęka	68	(2)
- * Club domestic league appearances and goals as of 13 July 2023

Oleh Vasylyovych Okhrimenko (Ukrainian: Олег Васильович Охріменко; born 24 July 1993) is a Ukrainian professional footballer who plays as a defender for Polish club Narew Ostrołęka.

== Career ==
Okhrimenko started his career in the young academy of Yunist Chernihiv in 2010. In 2012 he moved to Polissya Dobryanka, were played 16 matches and scored 2 goals. In 2013 he moved to Nizhyn and Frunzenets Nizhyn. In 2015 he moved to YSB Chernihiv in the city of Chernihiv where he played 9 matches and in 2016 he played 17 matches with Yednist Plysky scoring 4 goals. In 2017 he moved Polissya Zhytomyr in Ukrainian Second League, where he played 13 matches. He played his first match with the new club against Lviv. In 2020 he moved to Narew Ostrołęka in Poland.
