= Vadym Postovoy =

Ukrainian footballer (born 1967)

Personal information
- Full name: Vadym Volodymyrovych Postovoy
- Date of birth: 30 August 1967 (age 59)
- Place of birth: Baranivka, Soviet Union (now Ukraine)
- Height: 1.76 m (5 ft 9 in)
- Position: Defender

Youth career
- Spartak Zhytomyr
- 198?–1983: RSShI Kyiv
- 1984: Dynamo Kyiv

Senior career*
Years	Team	Apps	(Gls)
1984–1985	Nyva Ternopil	44	(0)
1986	LVVPU		
1987	Zirka Lviv		
1988–1990	Desna Chernihiv	107	(11)
1991	Karpaty Kamianka-Buzka	40	(2)
1992	Skala Stryi	13	(3)
1992–1993	Tekstylnyk Chernihiv		
1993–1995	Dnipro Cherkasy	57	(11)
1995–1996	Polihraftekhnika Oleksandriya	15	(2)
1996	Prykarpattia Ivano-Frankivsk	1	(0)
1996	Papirnyk Malyn	12	(0)
1997	Torpedo Minsk	2	(0)
1997	→ Shakhtyor Soligorsk (loan)	1	(0)
1998	Papirnyk Malyn	5	(0)
1998–1999	Cheksyl Chernihiv	8	(7)
1999–2001	Desna Chernihiv	30	(5)
2004	Mena	2	(0)

Managerial career
- 2006–2021: Chernihiv
- 2021–: SDYuShOR Chernihiv
- * Club domestic league appearances and goals

Vadym Postovoy (Ukrainian: Вадим Володимирович Постовой; born 30 August 1967) is a Ukrainian former professional footballer who played as a defender.

== Playing career ==
Postovoy started his career in Dynamo Kyiv. He also played in clubs like Nyva Ternopil, Desna Chernihiv, Tekstylnyk Chernihiv, Prykarpattia Ivano-Frankivsk, Torpedo Minsk, Shakhtyor Soligorsk. In 1986, along with Yuriy Vernydub, Postovoy served his military service in LVVPU. In 1998, he moved to Cheksyl Chernihiv, another team in the city of Chernihiv, where he played eight matches and scored seven goals. In 1999 he returned to Desna Chernihiv and he has been appointed captain of the club.

== Coaching career ==
Postovoy in 2006 was appointed as the coach of FC Chernihiv, the second main club of Chernihiv just promoted in Ukrainian Second League for the season 2020–21. On 21 April 2021 he was appointed as coach of Yunist Chernihiv part of the academy of FC Chernihiv.

== Honours ==
=== Player ===
Karpaty Lviv

- Soviet Second League: 1991 (Zone West)

=== Coach ===
FC Chernihiv

- Chernihiv Oblast Football Championship: 2019
- Chernihiv Oblast Football Cup: 2012
