= 2019 Football Championship of Chernihiv Oblast =

Football Championship of Chernihiv Oblast
- Season: 2019
- Champions: FC Chernihiv

The 2019 Football Championship of Chernihiv Oblast rnihivn by FC Chernihiv.

== League table ==
Pos	Team	Pld	W	D	L	GF	GA	GD	Pts
1	Chernihiv (C)	8	7	0	1	35	6	+29	21
2	Yunist-Nika Chernihiv	8	4	2	2	15	16	−1	14
3	Prohres Ostapivka	8	4	1	3	15	13	+2	13
4	Nizhyn	8	3	1	4	19	22	−3	10
5	Horodnya	8	0	0	8	3	30	−27	0

Source: "Чемпіонат Чернігівської області 2019". Footboom. Archived from the original on 2020-06-18.
(C) Champions
- FC Chernihiv also played in the 2019–20 Ukrainian Football Amateur League.

== Goalscorers ==
As of 5 January 2025

Rank	Scorer	Team	Goals (Pen.)
1	(Ukraine) Dmytro Myronenko	Chernihiv	10 (0)
