= Chernihiv Oblast Football Association =

Ukrainian football association

Chernihiv Oblast Football Association is a football governing body in the region of Chernihiv Oblast, Ukraine. The association is a collective member of the Ukrainian Association of Football.

The first championship took place in 1935.

== Presidents ==
List of presidents

- 2024 – Roman Solodarenko

== Previous Champions ==
- 1935 FC Dynamo Chernihiv
- 1941-44 =World War II=
- 1947 FC Vympel Chernihiv
- 1948 FC Vympel Chernihiv (2)
- 1949 GDO Pryluky
- 1950 GDO Pryluky (2)
- 1951 FC Mashzavod Pryluky
- 1952 team of Chernihiv city
- 1953 FC Mashzavod Pryluky (2)
- 1954 team of Chernihiv city (2)
- 1955 team of Chernihiv city (3)
- 1956 ATK Chernihiv
- 1957 FC Avanhard Pryluky
- 1958 ATK Chernihiv (2)
- 1959 PPO Ladan
- 1960 PPO Ladan (2)
- 1961 FC Mashzavod Pryluky (3)
- 1962 FC Zirka Chernihiv
- 1963 FC Desna
- 1964 FC Avanhard Ladan
- 1965 FC Torpedo Nizhyn
- 1966 FC Avanhard Ladan (2)
- 1967 FC Khimik Chernihiv
- 1968 FC Khimik Chernihiv (2)
- 1969 FC Khimik Chernihiv (3)
- 1970 FC Khimik Chernihiv (4)
- 1971 FC Khimik Chernihiv (5)
- 1972 FC Khimik Chernihiv (6)
- 1973 FC Khimik Chernihiv (7)
- 1974 FC Khimik Chernihiv (8)
- 1975 FC Khimik Chernihiv (9)
- 1976 FC Khimik Chernihiv (10)
- 1977 FC Promin Chernihiv
- 1978 FC Promin Chernihiv (2)
- 1979 FC Promin Chernihiv (3)
- 1980 FC Promin Chernihiv (4)
- 1981 FC Prohres Chernihiv
- 1982 FC Promin Chernihiv (5)
- 1983 FC Tekstylnyk Chernihiv
- 1984 FC Khimik Chernihiv (11)
- 1985 FC Khimik Chernihiv (12)
- 1986 FC Khimik Chernihiv (13)
- 1987 FC Khimik Chernihiv (14)
- 1988 FC Hidrotekhnik Chernihiv
- 1989 FC Hidrotekhnik Chernihiv (2)
- 1990 FC Komunalnyk Chernihiv
- 1991 FC Khimik Chernihiv (15)
- =independence of Ukraine=
- 1992 FC Tekstylnyk Chernihiv (2)
- 1993 FC Khimik Chernihiv (16)
- 1994 FC Fakel Varva
- 1995 FC Fakel Varva (2)
- 1996 FC Fakel-2 Varva (3)
- 1997 FC Cheksyl Chernihiv
- 1998 FC Nizhyn
- 1999 FC HPZ Varva (4)
- 2000 FC Nizhyn (2)
- 2001 FC Fakel Varva (5)
- 2002 FC Fakel-HPZ Varva (6)
- 2003 FC Polissia Dobrianka
- 2004 FC Nizhyn (3)
- 2005 FC Yednist Plysky
- 2006 FC Nizhyn (4)
- 2007 FC Avangard Korukivka
- 2008 FC Yednist-2 Plysky (2)
- 2009 FC Yednist-2 Plysky (3)
- 2010 FC Yednist-2 Plysky (4)
- 2011 FC Yednist-2 Plysky (5)
- 2012 FC Avangard Korukivka (2)
- 2013 FC Avangard Korukivka (3)
- =Russo-Ukrainian War=
- 2014 FC Yednist Plysky (6)
- 2015 FC Yednist Plysky (7)
- 2016 FC Frunzivets Nizhyn
- 2017 FC Ahrodim Bakhmach
- 2018 FC Fortuna Komarivka
- 2019 FC Chernihiv
- 2020 FC Ahrodim Bakhmach (2)
- 2021 FC Kudrivka-2
- =full-scale Russian invasion=
- 2022 FC Kudrivka
- 2023 FC Kremin
- 2024 FC Borzna
- 2025 FC Kudrivka
- 2026 FC Pryluky

=== Top winners ===
- 16 - FC Khimik Chernihiv
- 7 - FC Yednist Plysky (including Yednist-2)
- 6 - FC Fakel Varva (including Fakel-2)
- 5 - FC Promin Chernihiv
- 4 - FC Nizhyn
- 3 - 3 clubs (Mashzavod, Cheksyl (Tekstylnyk), Avanhard)
- 2 - 7 clubs (team of Chernihiv, GDO, Vympel, ATK, Avanhard L., Hidrotekhnyk, Ahrodim)
- 1 - 13 clubs

== Cup winners ==
- 1956 ATK Chernihiv
- 1957 FC Pryluky
- 1958 ???
- 1959 PPO Ladan
- 1960 FC Zirka Chernihiv
- 1961 FC Zirka Chernihiv
- 1962 FC Zirka Chernihiv
- 1963 FC Zirka Chernihiv
- 1964 FC Spartak Chernihiv
- 1965 FC Desna Oster
- 1966 FC Khimik Chernihiv
- 1967 FC Khimik Chernihiv
- 1968 FC Khimik Chernihiv
- 1969 FC Khimik Chernihiv
- 1970 FFC Khimik Chernihiv
- 1971 FC KSK Chernihiv
- 1972 FC Avtomobilist Chernihiv
- 1973 FC Silmash Nizhyn
- 1974 FC Khimik Chernihiv
- 1975 FC Khimik Chernihiv
- 1976 ???
- 1977 FC Desna Oster
- 1978 FC Promin Chernihiv
- 1979 FC Promin Chernihiv
- 1980 FC Promin Chernihiv
- 1981 FC Prohres Nizhyn
- 1982 FC Promin Chernihiv
- 1983 FC Prohres Nizhyn
- 1984 FC Tekstylnyk Chernihiv
- 1985 FC Khimik Chernihiv
- 1986 FC Hidrotekhnik Chernihiv
- 1987 FC Prohres Nizhyn
- 1988 FC Khimik Chernihiv
- 1989 FC Hidrotekhnik Chernihiv
- 1990 FC Avanhard Ladan
- 1991 no competition
- 1992 no competition
- 1993 no competition
- 1994 no competition
- 1995 FC Fakel Varva
- 1996 FC Domobudivnyk Chernihiv
- 1997 FC Domobudivnyk Chernihiv
- 1998 FC Komunalnyk Chernihiv
- 1999 FC Nizhyn
- 2000 FC Nizhyn
- 2001 FC Nizhyn
- 2002 FC Nizhyn
- 2003 FC Nizhyn
- 2004 FC Nizhyn
- 2005 FC Yednist Plysky
- 2006 FC Polissia Dobrianka
- 2007 FC Yednist-2 Plysky
- 2008 FC Yednist-2 Plysky
- 2009 FC Yednist-2 Plysky
- 2010 FC Yednist-2 Plysky
- 2011 FC Avangard Korukivka
- 2012 YSB Chernihiv
- 2013 FC Avangard Korukivka
- 2014 FC Yednist Plysky
- 2015 FC Yednist Plysky
- 2016 FC Frunzivets Nizhyn
- 2017 ?
- 2018 ?
- 2019 FC Kudrivka
- 2020 ?
- 2021 FC Kudrivka
- 2022 FC Kudrivka
- 2023 ?
- 2024 ?
- 2025 FC Kudrivka
- 2026 FC Kudrivka

== Professional clubs ==
locations of all professional clubs and "teams of maters"
- FC Desna Chernihiv (Avangard), 1960-1970, 1977-2022 (57 seasons)
  - Desna-2, 2008 (a season)

- FC Fakel Varva, 1996-1998 (2 seasons)
- FC Avers Bakhmach, 1997-1998 (a season)
- FC Yednist Plysky, 2005-2012 (7 seasons)
- FC Chernihiv, 2020-present (4 seasons)
- FC Kudrivka, 2023-present (a season)

Note:

- In 1972–1976 there existed SC Chernigov as the team of the Kiev Military District, a relocation of SKA Kiev.

== Other clubs at national/republican level ==
Note: the list includes clubs that played at republican competitions before 1959 and the amateur or KFK competitions after 1964.

- Chernihiv, 1936, 1954–1956
- Spartak Chernihiv, 1937–1940, 1949, 1951
- Dynamo Chernihiv, 1946, 1948
- Vympel Chernihiv, 1947
- Mashynobudivnyk Prylulky, 1949, 1952
- Chervona Zirka Chernihiv, 1952
- Torpedo Prylulky, 1953
- Avanhard Prylulky, 1957, 1959
- Avanhard Chernihiv, 1958, 1959
- Nizhyn, 1958
- Budivelnyk Chernihiv, 1965
- Mashzavod Nizhyn, 1966
- Khimik Chernihiv, 1968, 1970 – 1976
- Promin Chernihiv, 1976 – 1980
- Prohres Nizhyn, 1981, 1982
- Tekstylnyk Chernihiv, 1984, 1992-93 – 1994-95
- Hidrotekhnik Chernihiv, 1989
- Politekhnik Chernihiv, 1990
- Avers Bakhmach, 1992-93 – 1994-95, 1996-97
- Fakel Varva, 1992-93, 1995-96, 1998-99 – 2003
- Domobudivnyk Chernihiv, 1997-98, 1998-99
- FC Nizhyn, 1999 – 2005
- Yevropa Pryluky, 2001 – 2005
- Yednist/Yednist-2 Plysky, 2004, 2007 – 2011, 2014 – 2017-18
- Interahrosystema Mena, 2004
- Desna-2 Chernihiv, 2008
- Avanhard Koriukivka, 2013 – 2015, 2016-17 – 2019-20
- Chernihiv, 2013, 2017-18, 2019-20
- Ahrodim Bakhmach, 2018-19, 2019-20
- FC Kudrivka, 2020-21, 2021-22

Chernihiv (1936), Pryluky (1949), Nizhyn (1958), Bakhmach (1992), Varva (1992), Plysky (2004), Mena (2004), Koriukivka (2013), Kudrivka (2020)

== See also ==
- Chernihiv Oblast Football Super Cup
- FFU Council of Regions
