= 2021–22 FC Chernihiv season =

Chernihiv
2021–22 season
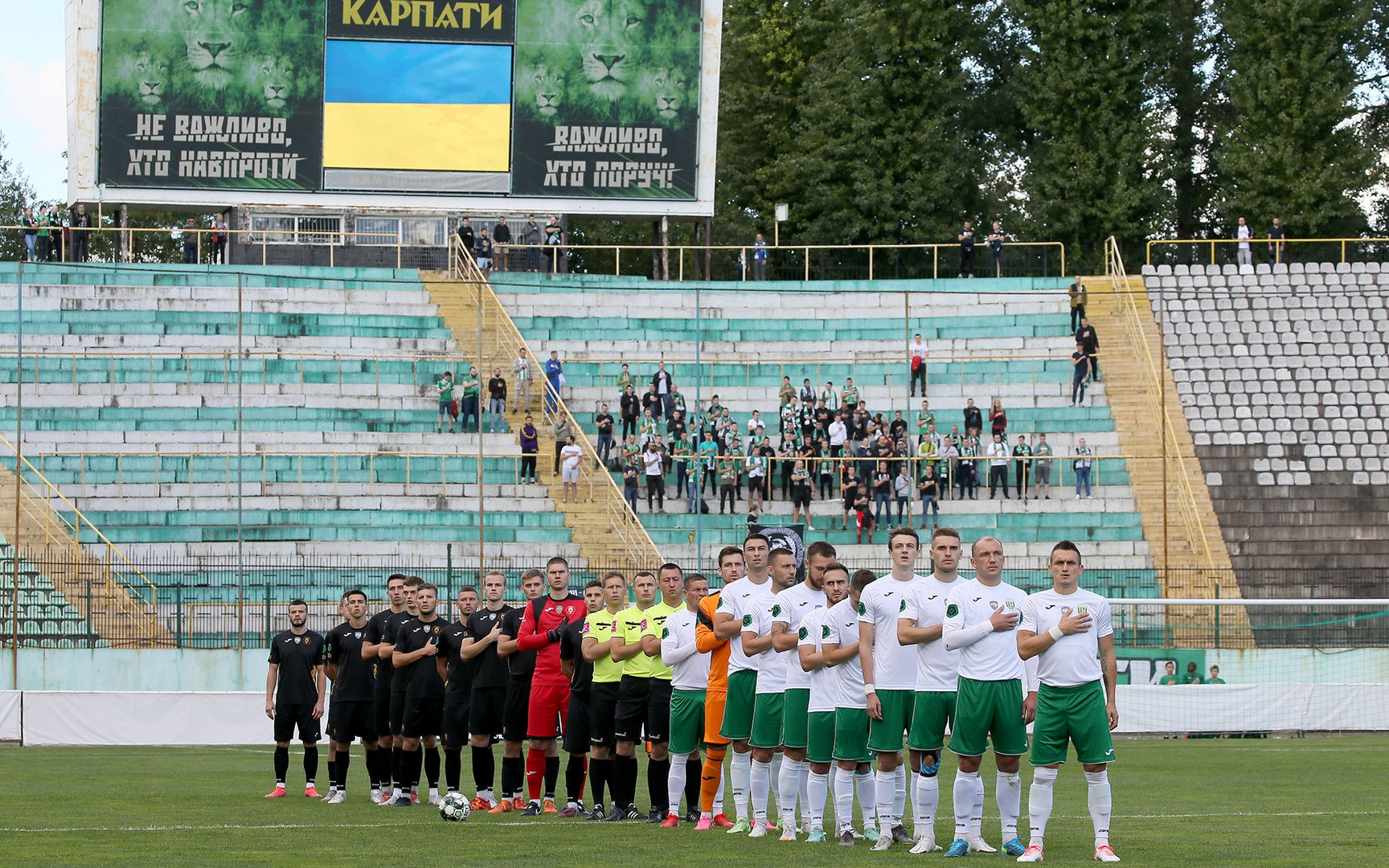
- Karpaty Lviv 5–0 FC Chernihiv
- Owner: Yuriy Synytsya
- Director: Mykola Synytsya
- Manager: Valeriy Chornyi
- Stadium: Chernihiv Arena
- Ukrainian Second League: Group A, 10th of 14
- Ukrainian Cup: Round of 32 (1/16)
- Top goalscorer: League: Bohdan Lazarenko (3); Vitaliy Mentey (3); Anatoliy Romanchenko (3); All: Bohdan Lazarenko (3); Andriy Porokhnya (3); Vitaliy Mentey (3); Anatoliy Romanchenko (3)
- Biggest win: AFSC Kyiv 1–3 FC Chernihiv; Lyubomyr 0–3 FC Chernihiv
Home colours	Away colours	Third colours

The 2021–22 season was FC Chernihiv's second season. It competed in the Ukrainian Second League. The sponsor of the club was Joma.

== Season summary ==
The club in summer 2021, started train in the Khimik Sport Complex with the task of also re-evaluating the sports facility. FC Chernihiv reached the Third preliminary round of 2021–22 Ukrainian Cup, winning to Chaika by penalty, in Makariv and after losing to Alians Lypova Dolyna 1–5, in Chernihiv Arena. The club was at the 10th position in the league, but due to the 2022 Russian invasion of Ukraine, the competition was terminated at the PFL Council meeting on 6 May 2022. On 9 March 2022, during the Siege of Chernihiv, the Chernihiv Arena was damaged, as well as part of the administrative building and locker rooms, the box office, the fan shop and the stele, which boasts the name of the stadium.

== Players ==
=== Squad information ===
As of 20 November 2021

Squad no.	Name	Nationality	Position	Date of birth (age)
Goalkeepers
12	Artem Padun	(Ukraine)	GK	4 January 1992 (age 29)
22	Oleksandr Roshchynskyi	(Ukraine)	GK	30 November 2000 (age 20)
35	Oleksandr Shyray	(Ukraine)	GK	21 February 1992 (age 29)
Defenders
2	Igor Samoylenko	(Ukraine)	DF	17 March 2001 (age 20)
3	Maksym Shumylo	(Ukraine)	DF	31 August 2002 (age 18)
6	Andriy Veresotskyi	(Ukraine)	DF	21 January 1992 (age 29)
15	Andriy Lakeyenko	(Ukraine)	DF	29 September 1999 (age 21)
19	Dmytro Borshch (Captain)	(Ukraine)	DF	22 June 1994 (age 26)
23	Oleksiy Zenchenko	(Ukraine)	DF	17 October 1996 (age 24)
99	Mykyta Hrebenshchykov	(Ukraine)	DF	29 March 2004 (age 17)
Midfielders
5	Anatoliy Romanchenko	(Ukraine)	MF	19 May 2001 (age 19)
7	Dmytro Myronenko	(Ukraine)	MF	7 March 1996 (age 25)
8	Andriy Makarenko	(Ukraine)	MF	13 December 1996 (age 24)
9	Kyrylo Kryvoborodenko	(Ukraine)	MF	8 September 1996 (age 24)
17	Andriy Porokhnya	(Ukraine)	MF	17 February 1997 (age 24)
18	Vitaliy Mentey	(Ukraine)	MF	5 August 1992 (age 28)
20	Artur Bybik	(Ukraine)	MF	26 July 2001 (age 19)
21	Denys Kildiy	(Ukraine)	MF	7 October 2004 (age 17)
77	Maksym Serdyuk	(Ukraine)	MF	21 May 2002 (age 18)
95	Bogdan Lazarenko	(Ukraine)	MF	3 March 1995 (age 26)
Forwards
11	Anatoly Kokhanovskyi	(Ukraine)	FW	5 October 1995 (age 25)
21	Vladyslav Kyryn	(Ukraine)	FW	13 January 1994 (age 27)
24	Bohdan Lytvynenko	(Ukraine)	FW	10 February (age 18)
27	Maksym Chaus	(Ukraine)	FW	13 January 1994 (age 27)

== Management team ==
Position	Name	Year appointed	Last club/team
Manager	(Ukraine) Valeriy Chornyi	2021	Avanhard Koriukivka
Assistant Coach	(Ukraine) Andriy Polyanytsya	2022	SDYuShOR Desna Chernihiv
Goalkeeping Coach	(Ukraine) Artem Padun	2020	SDYuShOR Desna Chernihiv

== Transfers ==
=== In ===
Date	Pos.	Player	Age	Moving from	Type	Fee	Source
Summer
9 July 2021	GK	(Ukraine) Artem Padun	38	(Ukraine) Avanhard Koryukivka	Transfer	Free	
9 July 2021	MF	(Ukraine) Andriy Porokhnya	24	(Ukraine) FC Kudrivka	Transfer	Free	
9 July 2021	DF	(Ukraine) Igor Samoylenko	20	(Ukraine) Desna-2 Chernihiv	Transfer	Free	
14 July 2021	FW	(Ukraine) Bohdan Lytvynenko	18	(Ukraine) Desna-3 Chernihiv	Transfer	Free	
14 July 2021	DF	(Ukraine) Maksym Shumylo	18	(Ukraine) Desna-3 Chernihiv	Transfer	Free	
27 August 2021	MF	(Ukraine) Denys Kildiy	17	(Ukraine) Yunist Chernihiv	Transfer	Free	
27 August 2021	FW	(Ukraine) Mykyta Hrebenshchykov	17	(Ukraine) Yunist Chernihiv	Transfer	Free	
Winter
19 February 2022	FW	(Ukraine) Vyacheslav Koydan	28	(Ukraine) Olimpik Donetsk	Transferred	Free	

=== Out ===
Date	Pos.	Player	Age	Moving from	Type	Fee	Source
Summer
1 June 2021	DF	(Ukraine) Taras Movlyan	19	Unattached	End Contract	Free	
21 June 2021	MF	(Ukraine) Denys Sadovyi	25	Unattached	End Contract	Free	
21 June 2021	DF	(Ukraine) Anatoliy Naumenko	22	Unattached	End Contract	Free	
22 July 2021	DF	(Ukraine) Teymuraz Mchedlishvili	36	Unattached	Retired		
23 July 2021	MF	(Ukraine) Vyacheslav Koydan	27	(Ukraine) Olimpik Donetsk	Transfer		
27 July 2021	MF	(Ukraine) Oleksandr Konopko	27	Unattached	Retired		
30 July 2021	GK	(Ukraine) Artem Lutchenko	29	Unattached	Retired		
30 July 2021	MF	(Ukraine) Vladyslav Kosov	20	Unattached			
Winter
21 December 2021	FW	(Ukraine) Vladyslav Kyryn	28	Unattached	Transferred	Free	
3 February 2022	MF	(Ukraine) Bohdan Lazarenko	26	Unattached	Transferred	Free	
3 February 2022	DF	(Ukraine) Igor Samoylenko	19	Unattached	Transferred	Free	

== Pre-season and friendlies ==
Win Draw Loss

10 July 2021 Friendly	Desna Chernihiv (Ukraine)	3-0	(Ukraine) FC Chernihiv	Chernihiv
EET (UTC+02:00)	Budkivskyi; Budkivskyi, Bezborodko			Stadium: Stadion Yuri Gagarin

14 July 2021 Friendly	SC Chaika (Ukraine)	3-0	(Ukraine) FC Chernihiv	Plysky
EET (UTC+02:00)	Pohranichnyi 11'; Nivaldo 75'; Nivaldo 82'

5 February 2022 Friendly	FC Chernihiv (Ukraine)	1-0	(Ukraine) Desna Chernihiv	Chernihiv
EET (UTC+15:30)	Serdyuk 38'	Report		Stadium: Yunist Stadium

12 February 2022 Friendly	SC Chaika (Ukraine)	2-2	(Ukraine) FC Chernihiv	Kyiv
EET (UTC+16:00)	Shakun 28'; Bartoshuk 38'	Report	Koydan 50'; Makarenko 70'	Stadium: Skk Sofiyivsʹkyy, Kyiv Oblast

16 February 2022 Friendly	FC Chernihiv (Ukraine)	7-1	(Ukraine) Desna Chernihiv U19	Chernihiv
EET (UTC+11:00)	Mentey 28'; 9' (o.g.); Porokhnya 50'; Koydan 60'; Porokhnya 77'; Porokhnya 80'			Stadium: Chernihiv Arena

19 February 2022 Friendly	Nyva Buzova (Ukraine)	3-0	(Ukraine) FC Chernihiv	Buzova
EET (UTC+13:15)				Stadium: Buzova Arena

== Competitions ==
=== Results ===
24 July 2021 1	Munkacs Mukachevo	1–0	FC Chernihiv	Mukacheve
EEST (UTC+3)	Hirnyi 20'; Hirnyi (yellow card) 35'; Lutsiv (yellow card) 80'; Sten (yellow card) 90+3'	Report	Serdyuk (yellow card) 21'; Romanchenko (yellow card) 44'; Borshch (yellow card) 60'; Mentey (yellow card) 71'	Stadium: Avanhard Stadium; Attendance: 250

8 August 2021 2	Rubikon Kyiv	2–0	FC Chernihiv	Kyiv
EEST (UTC+3)	Zorenko (yellow card) 7'; Umanets 17'; Lutsenko (yellow card) 32'; Borodenko (yellow card) 52'; Pokoyovyi 74' (pen); Mohil (yellow card) 78'	Report	Serdyuk (yellow card) 26'; Shumylo (yellow card) 69'; Mentey (red card) 90+5	Stadium: Arsenal-Knyazha Arena; Attendance: 100

14 August 2021 3	FC Chernihiv	2–1	Dnipro Cherkasy	Chernihiv
EEST (UTC+3)	Zenchenko (yellow card) 10'; Lytvynenko 23'; Veresotskyi (yellow card) 31'; Shumylo (yellow card) 33'; Lazarenko 45'; Lytvynenko (yellow card) 53'; Lytvynenko (yellow card) 53'; Samoylenko (yellow card) 63'; Chaus (yellow card) 68'; Romanchenko (yellow card) 74'; Shyray (yellow card) 90+4'	Report	Bida 54'; Klyus (yellow card) 64'	Stadium: Chernihiv Arena

22 August 2021 4	FC Chernihiv	0–0	AFSC Kyiv	Chernihiv
EEST (UTC+3)	Porokhnya (yellow card) 39' (yellow-red card) 77'; Veresotskyi (yellow card) 62'; Borshch (penalty missed) 92+2'	Report	Nahayskyi (yellow card) 90+2'	Stadium: Chernihiv Arena

27 August 2021 5	FC Chernihiv	1–2	Dinaz Vyshhorod	Chernihiv
EEST (UTC+3)	Mentey 8'; Mentey (yellow card) 33'; Romanchenko (yellow card) 42'; Borshch (yellow card) 43'	Report	Mayboroda (yellow card) 20'; Apanchuk 33'; Apanchuk 65'; Petrenko (yellow card) 69'; Bryzhenko (yellow card) 89'	Stadium: Chernihiv Arena

5 September 2021 6	Karpaty Lviv	5–0	FC Chernihiv	Lviv
EEST (UTC+3)	Romanchenko 4' (o.g.); Chachua 15'; Zastavnyi (yellow card) 17'; Humenyuk 65'; Apanchuk 67'; Pryimak 77'	Report	Serdyuk (yellow card) 12'; Kryvoborodenko (yellow card) 90+3'	Stadium: Ukraina Stadium; Attendance: 3300

11 September 2021 7	LNZ Cherkasy	1–0	FC Chernihiv	Cherkasy
EEST (UTC+3)	Norenkov 44'; Panchenko (yellow card) 90+3'	Report	Porokhnya (yellow card) 15'; Bybik (yellow card) 75'	Stadium: Cherkasy Arena; Attendance: 1100

18 September 2021 8	FC Chernihiv	0–0	Bukovyna Chernivtsi	Chernihiv
EEST (UTC+3)	Porokhnya (yellow card) 19'; Myronenko (yellow card) 27'; Mentey (yellow card) 51'; Romanchenko (yellow card) 84'; Lazarenko (yellow card) 80' (yellow-red card) 85'	Report	Dmytriyev (yellow card) 42'; Hakman (yellow card) 51'; Stolyar (yellow card) 56'; Orlovskyi (yellow card) 72'	Stadium: Chernihiv Arena; Attendance: 250

26 September 2021 9	Karpaty Halych	1–1	FC Chernihiv	Burshtyn
EEST (UTC+3)	Sushchak 74'	Report	Serdyuk (yellow card) 20'; Zenchenko (yellow card) 34'; Kryvoborodenko 45+2'; Bybik (yellow card) 76'; Borshch (yellow card) 85'	Stadium: Enerhetyk Stadium

2 October 2021 10	FC Chernihiv	0–0	Nyva Vinnytsia	Chernihiv
EEST (UTC+3)		Report		Stadium: Chernihiv Arena

6 October 2021 11	Livyi Bereh Kyiv	2–0	FC Chernihiv	Hnidyn
EEST (UTC+3)	Huskov 26'; Ishchenko (yellow card) 61'; Petrenko 69'	Report	Kryvoborodenko (yellow card) 1'; Lytvynenko (yellow card) 38'; Lazarenko (yellow card) 76'	Stadium: Arena Livyi Bereh

10 October 2021 12	FC Chernihiv	3–2	Dunaivtsi	Chernihiv
EEST (UTC+3)	Borshch (yellow card) 31'; Romanchenko 38'; Lazarenko 66'; Lazarenko 80'; Lazarenko (yellow card) 81'	Report	Ivashko 59'; Ratsa (yellow card) 77'; Yakubov 77'	Stadium: Chernihiv Arena

16 October 2021 13	Lyubomyr Stavyshche	0–3	FC Chernihiv	Stavyshche
EEST (UTC+3)	Kyyanytsya (yellow card) 34'; Komisar (yellow card) 58'; Marchuk (yellow card) 73'; Yurchenko (yellow card) 69'	Report	Borshch (yellow card) 34'; Romanchenko 38'; Bybik (yellow card) 45+1'; Serdyuk 47'; Porokhnya 56'; Roshchynskyi (yellow card) 58'; Shumylo (yellow card) 69'	Stadium: Kolos Stadium

23 October 2021 14	FC Chernihiv	2–2	SC Chaika	Chernihiv
EEST (UTC+3)	Zenchenko 23'; Zenchenko (yellow card) 59'; Serdyuk (yellow card) 61'; Zenchenko (yellow card) 59' (yellow-red card) 79'; Lytvynenko 90+3'	Report	Rusyan (yellow card) 56'; Pohranichnyi (yellow card) 61'; Lazarets 72'; Ivanov (yellow card) 79'; Dovhyi (yellow card) 83'; Bartoshuk 87'; Muzychenko (yellow card) 89'	Stadium: Chernihiv Arena

30 October 2021 15	FC Chernihiv	0–2	Munkacs Mukachevo	Chernihiv
EEST (UTC+3)	Serdyuk (yellow card) 15'; Porokhnya (yellow card) 21'; Mentey (yellow card) 33'; Romanchenko (yellow card) 37'; Bybik (yellow card) 50'; Lytvynenko (yellow card) 52'; Lytvynenko (yellow card) 21' (yellow-red card) 52'; Porokhnya (yellow card) 21' (yellow-red card) 85'; Shyray (yellow card) 86'	Report	Sten (yellow card) 19'; Pyshchur (yellow card) 35'; Sten 39'; Hrytsak (yellow card) 60'; Halas (yellow card) 89'; Hirnyi 90+4'	Stadium: Chernihiv Arena

13 November 2021 16	FC Chernihiv	2–1	Rubikon Kyiv	Chernihiv
EEST (UTC+3)	Borshch (yellow card) 4'; Mentey (yellow card) 32'; Myronenko 33'; Zenchenko 81'	Report	Hrabovskyi (yellow card) 32'; Zorenko 45+1'; Borodenko (yellow card) 53'	Stadium: Chernihiv Arena

20 November 2021 17	Dnipro Cherkasy	1–0	FC Chernihiv	Cherkasy
EEST (UTC+3)	Ivakhno (yellow card) 38'; Martyan 71'; Kuznetsov (yellow card) 83'	Report	Chaus (yellow card) 74'; Zenchenko (yellow card) 34' (yellow-red card) 88'; Mentey (yellow card) 90+3'	Stadium: Tsentralnyi Stadion

28 November 2021 18	AFSC Kyiv	1–3	FC Chernihiv	Lyutizh
EEST (UTC+3)	Semchuk 4'	Report	Mentey 4'; Romanchenko 24'; Mentey 90+1'	Stadium: Dinaz Stadium

=== Ukrainian Cup ===
18 August 2021 Round of 32 (1/16)	Chaika Petropavlivska Borshchahivka	1 – 1 (a.e.t.) (3–5 p)	FC Chernihiv	Makariv
17:00 EEST (UTC+03:00)	Lakeyenko 76' (o.g.)	Report	Porokhnya 12'; Chaus (penalty missed) 14'	Stadium: Tsentralnyi Stadion im.Brukvenka; Attendance: 250; Referee: V.Faida (Lviv)
	Penalties
	Pohranichnyi (penalty missed); Potopalsky (penalty scored); Dovhyi (penalty scored); Nivaldo (penalty scored)		(penalty scored) Borshch; (penalty scored) Porokhnya; (penalty scored) Zenchenko; (penalty scored) Shumylo; (penalty scored) Kryvoborodenko

31 August 2021	FC Chernihiv	1–5	Alians Lypova Dolyna	Chernihiv
EEST (UTC+3)	Porokhnya 86'	Report	Karnoza 14'; Shmyhelskyi 34'; Ahapov 82'; Zahynaylov 89'; Pidnebennoy 90+4'	Stadium: Chernihiv Arena; Referee: A.Mykhailyuk (Kyiv)

== Statistics ==
=== Appearances and goals ===
No.	Pos	Nat	Player	Total		Ukrainian Second League		Cup		EL	
No.	Pos	Nat	Player	Apps	Goals	Apps	Goals	Apps	Goals	Apps	Goals
Goalkeepers
12	GK	(Ukraine) UKR	Artem Padun	0	0	0	0	0	0	0	0
22	GK	(Ukraine) UKR	Oleksandr Roshchynskyi	7	0	5	0	2	0	0	0
35	GK	(Ukraine) UKR	Oleksandr Shyray	13	0	13	0	0	0	0	0
Defenders
3	DF	(Ukraine) UKR	Maksym Shumylo	16	0	16	0	0	0	0	0
6	DF	(Ukraine) UKR	Andriy Veresotskyi	5	0	4	0	1	0	0	0
15	DF	(Ukraine) UKR	Andriy Lakeyenko	15	0	13	0	2	0	0	0
19	DF	(Ukraine) UKR	Dmytro Borshch	19	0	17	0	2	0	0	0
21	DF	(Ukraine) UKR	Vladyslav Kosov	0	0	0	0	0	0	0	0
23	DF	(Ukraine) UKR	Oleksiy Zenchenko	17	2	15	2	2	0	0	0
99	DF	(Ukraine) UKR	Mykyta Hrebenshchykov	4	0	4	0	0	0	0	0
Midfielders
5	MF	(Ukraine) UKR	Anatoliy Romanchenko	17	3	16	3	1	0	0	0
7	MF	(Ukraine) UKR	Dmytro Myronenko	19	1	17	1	2	0	0	0
8	MF	(Ukraine) UKR	Andriy Makarenko	9	0	8	0	1	0	0	0
11	MF	(Ukraine) UKR	Kyrylo Kryvoborodenko	17	1	16	1	1	0	0	0
17	MF	(Ukraine) UKR	Andriy Porokhnya	17	3	15	1	2	2	0	0
18	MF	(Ukraine) UKR	Vitaliy Mentey	16	3	15	3	1	0	0	0
20	MF	(Ukraine) UKR	Artur Bybik	18	0	16	0	2	0	0	0
21	FW	(Ukraine) UKR	Denys Kildiy	4	0	4	0	0	0	0	0
77	MF	(Ukraine) UKR	Maksym Serdyuk	19	1	17	1	2	0	0	0
Forwards
11	FW	(Ukraine) UKR	Anatoly Kokhanovskyi	2	0	2	0	0	0	0	0
24	FW	(Ukraine) UKR	Bohdan Lytvynenko	14	2	12	2	2	0	0	0
27	FW	(Ukraine) UKR	Maksym Chaus	13	0	12	0	1	0	0	0
Players transferred out during the season
2	DF	(Ukraine) UKR	Igor Samoylenko	5	0	4	0	1	0	0	0
21	FW	(Ukraine) UKR	Vladyslav Kyryn	0	0	0	0	0	0	0	0
95	MF	(Ukraine) UKR	Bogdan Lazarenko	15	3	14	3	1	0	0	0

Source: Competitions

Last updated: 3 February 2022

=== Goalscorers ===
Rank	No.	Pos	Nat	Name	Premier League	Cup	Europa League	Total
1	95	MF	(Ukraine)	Bohdan Lazarenko	3	0	0	3
1	5	MF	(Ukraine)	Anatoliy Romanchenko	3	0	0	3
1	18	MF	(Ukraine)	Vitaliy Mentey	3	0	0	3
1	17	MF	(Ukraine)	Andriy Porokhnya	1	2	0	3
2	24	FW	(Ukraine)	Bohdan Lytvynenko	2	0	0	2
2	23	DF	(Ukraine)	Oleksiy Zenchenko	2	0	0	2
3	9	MF	(Ukraine)	Kyrylo Kryvoborodenko	1	0	0	1
3	9	MF	(Ukraine)	Maksym Serdyuk	1	0	0	1
3	7	MF	(Ukraine)	Dmytro Myronenko	1	0	0	1
				Total	17	2	0	18

Last updated: 27 November 2021

=== Clean sheets ===
Rank	No.	Pos	Nat	Name	Premier League	Cup	Europa League	Total
1	35	GK	(Ukraine)	Oleksandr Shyray	3	0	0	3
2	22	GK	(Ukraine)	Oleksandr Roshchynskyi	1	0	0	1
				Total	4	0	0	4

Last updated: 16 October 2021

=== Disciplinary record ===
No.	Pos	Nat	Player	Second League			Ukrainian Cup			Europa League			Total		
No.	Pos	Nat	Player	Yellow card	(yellow card) (yellow-red card)	Red card	Yellow card	(yellow card) (yellow-red card)	Red card	Yellow card	(yellow card) (yellow-red card)	Red card	Yellow card	(yellow card) (yellow-red card)	Red card
77	MF	(Ukraine)	Maksym Serdyuk	6	0	0	0	0	0	0	0	0	6	0	0
19	DF	(Ukraine)	Dmytro Borshch	6	0	0	0	0	0	0	0	0	6	0	0
18	MF	(Ukraine)	Vitaliy Mentey	6	0	1	0	0	0	0	0	0	6	0	1
5	MF	(Ukraine)	Anatoliy Romanchenko	5	0	0	0	0	0	0	0	0	5	0	0
20	MF	(Ukraine)	Artur Bybik	4	0	0	0	0	0	0	0	0	4	0	0
23	DF	(Ukraine)	Oleksiy Zenchenko	4	2	0	0	0	0	0	0	0	4	2	0
95	MF	(Ukraine)	Bohdan Lazarenko	3	1	0	0	0	0	0	0	0	3	1	0
17	MF	(Ukraine)	Andriy Porokhnya	3	2	0	0	0	0	0	0	0	3	2	0
24	FW	(Ukraine)	Bohdan Lytvynenko	3	1	0	0	0	0	0	0	0	3	1	0
6	DF	(Ukraine)	Andriy Veresotskyi	2	0	0	0	0	0	0	0	0	2	0	0
9	MF	(Ukraine)	Kyrylo Kryvoborodenko	2	0	0	0	0	0	0	0	0	2	0	0
3	DF	(Ukraine)	Maksym Shumylo	2	0	0	0	0	0	0	0	0	2	0	0
35	GK	(Ukraine)	Oleksandr Shyray	2	0	0	0	0	0	0	0	0	2	0	0
27	FW	(Ukraine)	Maksym Chaus	2	0	0	0	0	0	0	0	0	2	0	0
2	DF	(Ukraine)	Ihor Samoylenko	1	0	0	0	0	0	0	0	0	1	0	0
7	MF	(Ukraine)	Dmytro Myronenko	1	0	0	0	0	0	0	0	0	1	0	0
22	GK	(Ukraine)	Oleksandr Roshchynskyi	1	0	0	0	0	0	0	0	0	1	0	0
			Total	53	6	1	0	0	0	0	0	0	53	6	1

Last updated: 21 November 2021
