= Pavlo Dulzon =

Ukrainian footballer (born 1995)

Personal information
- Full name: Pavlo Oleksandrovych Dulzon
- Date of birth: 12 May 1995 (age 31)
- Place of birth: Chernihiv, Ukraine
- Height: 1.80 m (5 ft 11 in)
- Position: Striker

Youth career
- 2009: Yunist Chernihiv
- 2010: RVUFK Kyiv
- 2011: SDYuShOR Desna
- 2011–2012: Yunist Chernihiv

Senior career*
Years	Team	Apps	(Gls)
2012–2013	YSB Chernihiv	11	(1)
2013–2017	Avanhard Koryukivka	19	(0)
2016–2017	Ternopil	8	(0)
2016–2017	Yednist' Plysky	0	(0)
2016–2019	Viktoria Aschaffenburg	12	(4)
2019–2020	Koryukivka	0	(0)
2020–2021	Agrodim	1	(1)
2022–	Albirex Niigata Barcelona	5	(1)
- * Club domestic league appearances and goals as of 16 March 2023

Pavlo Dulzon (Ukrainian: Павло Олександрович Дульзон; born 12 May 1995) is a Ukrainian footballer who plays as a striker.

== Career ==
=== Early career ===
Born in Chernihiv, Dulzon started his career in the young academy of Yunist Chernihiv before moving to RVUFK Kyiv. In 2011 he moved to SDYuShOR Desna but returned to Yunist Chernihiv within a year.

=== Professional career ===
Dulzon began his professional career in 2012 with YSB Chernihiv and Avanhard Koryukivka. In 2016 he moved to FC Yednist' Plysky in Ukrainian Amateur League. In 2017 he moved to Ternopil in Ukrainian First League, where on 8 April 2017, he made his debut against Desna Chernihiv at the Obolon Arena in Kyiv. Later that same year, he moved to Viktoria Aschaffenburg in Germany, where he played 12 matches and scored 4 goals in Bayernliga Nord. In 2019 he returned to Koryukivka and then to Agrodim. In summer 2022 he moved to Albirex Niigata Barcelona.

== Career statistics ==
=== Club ===
As of match played 16 March 2023

Appearances and goals by club, season and competition
Club	Season	League			Cup		Europe		Other		Total	
Club	Season	Division	Apps	Goals	Apps	Goals	Apps	Goals	Apps	Goals	Apps	Goals
YSB Chernihiv	2012	Chernihiv Oblast Football Federation	4	1	0	0	0	0	0	0	4	1
YSB Chernihiv	2013	Ukrainian Football Amateur League	7	0	0	0	0	0	0	0	7	0
Avanhard Koryukivka	2015	Ukrainian Football Amateur League	10	0	0	0	0	0	0	0	10	0
Avanhard Koryukivka	2016	Chernihiv Oblast Football Federation	9	0	0	0	0	0	0	0	9	0
Ternopil	2016–17	Ukrainian First League	8	0	0	0	0	0	0	0	8	0
Yednist' Plysky	2016–17	Ukrainian Football Amateur League	0	0	0	0	0	0	0	0	0	0
Viktoria Aschaffenburg	2017–18	Bayernliga	4	2	0	0	0	0	0	0	4	2
Viktoria Aschaffenburg	2018–19	Bayernliga	8	2	0	0	0	0	0	0	8	2
Koryukivka	2019–20	Ukrainian Football Amateur League	0	0	0	0	0	0	0	0	0	0
Career total			0	0	0	0	0	0	0	0	0	0

== Honours ==
Viktoria Aschaffenburg

- Bayernliga Nord: 2018

Avanhard Koryukivka

- Chernihiv Oblast Football Championship: 2013
- Chernihiv Oblast Football Cup: 2013

YSB Chernihiv

- Chernihiv Oblast Football Cup: 2012
