= Chernihiv Oblast Football Super Cup =

- Founded: 2007
- Country: Ukraine
- Domestic cups: Chernihiv Football Cup; Chernihiv Foorball League
- Current champions: Kudrivka (3th title)
- Website: cnoff.com.ua

The Chernihiv Region Football Super Cup (Ukrainian: Суперкубок Чернігівської області з футболу) is a single-match football competition for amateur teams. It takes place annually under the auspices of the Chernihiv Region Football Federation. The Chernihiv Super Cup is contested between the league champion and the winner of the Chernihiv Region Cup from the previous season. If the same team has won both the cup and the league, the Super Cup final is played against either the cup runner-up or the league's second-placed team.

== Venues ==
Number	Name	Location	Years	Winning clubs
6	Chernihiv Arena	Chernihiv	2017, 2018, 2019, 2024, 2025, 2026	Ukrainian Freedom, Druzhba-Kozaky Nizhyn, Kudrivka, FC Khvylya, Agrodim Bakhmach, Fortuna (Komarivka), Chernihiv
3	Yunist Stadium	Chernihiv	2020, 2021, 2022	Kudrivka, Mena
2	Spartak Stadium	Nizhyn	2008, 2023	FC Yednist-2 Plysky, Borzna
1	Khimik Sport Complex	Chernihiv	2013	Chernihiv

== Results by season ==
Yearː	Datesː	Winnerː	Scoreː	Runner-upː	Venueː	Locationː	Souceː
2007		FC Yednist-2 Plysky					
2008							
2009	11 April	FC Yednist-2 Plysky	3–2	Polissya Dobryanka	Spartak Stadium	Nizhyn	
2010		Polissya Dobryanka	3–2	FC Yednist-2 Plysky			
2011							
2012		Avanhard Koriukivka	4–3	FC Yednist-2 Plysky			
2013	14 August	Chernihiv	1–0	Avanhard Koriukivka	Khimik Sport Complex	Chernihiv	
2014	4 October	FC Yednist Plysky	8–1	Zernoprom			
2015							
2016	5 November	Agrodim Bakhmach	1–0	Frunzivets			
2017	18 November	FC Khvylya	4–2	Agrodim Bakhmach	Chernihiv Arena	Chernihiv	
2018	6 October	Fortuna (Komarivka)	5–1	Olymp (Chernihiv)	Chernihiv Arena	Chernihiv	
2019	24 September	Chernihiv	4–1	Yunist Nika	Chernihiv Arena	Chernihiv	
2020	8 May	Mena	2–2 (a.e.t.) (3–2 p)	Agrodim Bakhmach	Yunist Stadium	Chernihiv	
2021	27 November	Kudrivka	2–1	Progress	Yunist Stadium	Chernihiv	
2022	23 March	Kudrivka	6–2	FC Khvylya	Yunist Stadium	Chernihiv	
2023	2 September	Borzna	1–0	Dynamo Kremin	Spartak Stadium	Nizhyn	
2024	27 April	Ukrainian Freedom	2–1	Koriukivka	Chernihiv Arena	Chernihiv	
2025	13 September	Druzhba-Kozaky Nizhyn	3–1	Kudrivka	Chernihiv Arena	Chernihiv	
2026	27 September	Kudrivka	2–1	FC Pryluky	Chernihiv Arena	Chernihiv	

== Performances ==
Achievements of clubs since 2007

Team	Winners	Winning years	Runners-up	Runners years	Finals
Kudrivka	3	2021, 2022, 2026	1	2025	4
Yednist-2 Plysky	2	2007, 2008	1	2010	3
Chernihiv	2	2013, 2019	0	—	2
Avanhard Koriukivka	1	2012	1	2013	2
FC Polissya Dobryanka	1	2010	1	2008	2
FC Agrodim Bakhmach	1	2016	2	2016, 2020	3
Fortuna (Komarivka)	1	2018	1	2022	2
Yednist Plysky	1	2014	—	—	1
FC Khvylya	1	2017	—	—	1
Mena	1	2020	—	—	1
Borzna	1	2023	—	—	1
Ukrainian Freedom	1	2024	—	—	1
Druzhba-Kozaky Nizhyn	1	2025	—	—	1
Zernoprom	—	—	1	2014	1
Frunzivets	—	—	1	2016	1
Olymp (Chernihiv)	—	—	1	2017	1
Yunist Nika	—	—	1	2019	1
Progress	—	—	1	2021	1
Dynamo Kremin	—	—	1	2023	1
Koriukivka	—	—	1	2024	1

== See also ==
- Chernihiv Oblast Football Association
- FFU Council of Regions
