= FC Avanhard Koriukivka =

Amateur football club in Koriukivka, Chernihiv Oblast, Ukraine

Avanhard Koriukivka
- Full name: Football Club Avanhard Koriukivka
- Founded: 1960
- Ground: Chernihiv Arena, Chernihiv; Paperovyk, Koriukivka
- Capacity: 500
- Chairman: Serhiy Kuzemko
Home colours	Away colours

Football Club Avanhard Koriukivka (Ukrainian: Футбольний Клуб Авангард Корюківка) is an amateur Ukrainian football team based in Koriukivka, Chernihiv Oblast. The club competes in the Chernihiv Oblast competition.

== History ==
The club was founded in 1960 in the Chernihiv Oblast. The club is known for its talented players like Nazar Voloshyn, Mykola Syrash, Andriy Polyanytsya, Serhiy Datsenko, Maksym Serdyuk, Teymuraz Mchedlishvili and Oleksandr Pyshchur. The club won the Chernihiv Oblast Football Championship in 2007, 2012, and 2013. The club also won the Chernihiv Oblast Football Cup in 2011 and 2012. In 2020, the club temporarily merged with FC Chernihiv and changed its name to FC Chernihiv-Avanhard Koriukivka. In 2022, they played in a football tournament held at the destroyed Chernihiv Stadium, and the club got into the final.

== Name ==
- 1960–2019 – Avanhard Koriukivka
- 2019–2020 – Chernihiv-Avanhard Koriukivka
- 2020– onwards – Avanhard Koriukivka

== League and cup history ==
Season	Div.	Pos.	Pl.	W	D	L	GS	GA	Domestic Cup	Other	Notes
2013											
2014											
2015											
2015											
2016											
2016–17	AL	11/2	20	4	2	1	18	40	Round of 32 (1/64)		
2017–18	AL	14	14	4	2	8	17	19	Round of 16 (1/8)		
2018–19	AL	22	9	7	6	9	31	38	Round of 8 (1/4)		
2019–20									Round of 8 (1/4)		

== Honours ==
Chernihiv Oblast Football Cup

- Winners (3): 2007, 2012, 2013

Chernihiv Oblast Super Cup:

- Winners (2):2011, 2013

== Notable players ==
Players who have played in the club and who have distinguished themselves in some higher leagues above the amateurs and who have also become coaches

- (Ukraine) Dmytro Borshch
- (Ukraine) Maksym Chaus
- (Ukraine) Valeriy Chornyi
- (Ukraine) Pavlo Fedosov
- (Ukraine) Oleksandr Kozhemyachenko
- (Ukraine) Pavlo Dulzon
- (Ukraine) Serhiy Datsenko
- (Ukraine) Oleksandr Pyshchur
- (Ukraine) Nazar Voloshyn
- (Ukraine) Mykola Syrash
- (Ukraine) Vitaliy Mentey

== Managers ==
- 2015: Valeriy Sokolenko
- 2015: Artem Padun
- 2015-2020: Valeriy Chornyi

== See also ==
- FC Chernihiv
