= List of sport teams in Chernihiv =

List of sports teams

== Teams and Venues ==
This List of Chernihiv full list of Sport Teams

Active Teams

Logo	Name	Description	Venue
	FC Desna Chernihiv	Men's football team	Stadion Yuri Gagarin
	FC Chernihiv	Men's football team	Chernihiv Arena, Yunist stadium
	WFC Lehenda-ShVSM Chernihiv	Women's football team	Lokomotiv stadium, Tekstylschyk stadium, Chernihiv Arena, Stadium Cheksil
	Burevisnyk-ShVSM Chernihiv	Men's volleyball team	Chernihiv National Pedagogical University
	FC Desna-2 Chernihiv	Reserve men's under-21 football team	Stadion Yuri Gagarin, Chernihiv Arena, Tekstylschyk stadium, Lokomotiv stadium
	FC Desna-3 Chernihiv	Reserve men's under-19 football team	Stadion Yuri Gagarin, Chernihiv Arena, Tekstylschyk stadium, Lokomotiv stadium
	SDYuShOR Desna	Youth football team	Stadion Yuri Gagarin
	Spartak ShVSM Chernihiv	Women's football team	Chernihiv Arena
	Yunist ShVSM	Women's youth football team	Yunist stadium
	BC Chernihiv	Men's basketball team	OKDYUSSH
	FC Udar Chernigov	Men's youth football team	Khimik Sport Complex, Stadium of the Lotnoe College
	FC Svoboda Chernigiv	Men's youth football team	Khimik Sport Complex, Stadium of the Lotnoe College
	FC PIVZAVOD DESNA	Men's youth football team	Khimik Sport Complex,
