= Dmytro Borshch =

Ukrainian footballer (born 1994)

Personal information
- Full name: Dmytro Volodymyrovych Borshch
- Date of birth: 22 June 1994 (age 32)
- Place of birth: Chernihiv, Ukraine
- Height: 1.70 m (5 ft 7 in)
- Position: Defender

Youth career
- 2011: Yunist Chernihiv

Senior career*
Years	Team	Apps	(Gls)
2020	Polissya Dobryanka	4	(0)
2012–2015	YSB Chernihiv	35	(3)
2015–2017	Avangard Korukivka	4	(0)
2017–2022	Chernihiv	55	(2)
- * Club domestic league appearances and goals as of 20 August 2022

Dmytro Volodymyrovych Borshch (Ukrainian: Дмитро Володимирович Борщ; born 22 June 1994) is a Ukrainian professional footballer who plays as a defender.

== Career ==
=== FC Chernihiv ===
In summer 2020, Dmytro Borshch played for FC Chernihiv, the second main team of the city of Chernihiv, just promoted to the Ukrainian Second League. In the season 2020-21. He scored his first goal of the season, away against FC Uzhhorod and, on 11 November 2020, he scored his second goal home against Dinaz Vyshhorod. On 18 August 2021 he led his team in Ukrainian Cup for the Second preliminary round, against Chaika Petropavlivska Borshchahivka in the season 2021–22 getting into the Third preliminary round for the first time for his club. On 22 August 2021 he missed a penalty against AFSC Kyiv at the Chernihiv Arena in Chernihiv. In August 2022 the club was admitted in Ukrainian First League and he commented this great achievement for the club of the city of Chernihiv. On 2 September 2022 with a mutual agreement with the club they decided to end the contract.

== Honours ==
Kudrivka

- Chernihiv Oblast Football Cupː 2026

FC Chernihiv

- Chernihiv Oblast Football Championship: 2019
