= Maksym Chaus =

Ukrainian footballer (born 1994)

Personal information
- Full name: Maksym Ivanovych Chaus
- Date of birth: 13 January 1994 (age 32)
- Place of birth: Chernihiv, Ukraine
- Height: 1.80 m (5 ft 11 in)
- Position: Striker

Youth career
- 2009: SDYuShOR Desna
- 2009–2011: Olimpik Donetsk

Senior career*
Years	Team	Apps	(Gls)
2012	Polissya Dobryanka	13	(4)
2013	LKT-Slavutych Chernihiv	21	(8)
2014	Polissya-Yunist Dobryanka	13	(3)
2015	Avanhard Koriukivka	25	(5)
2016–2017	Yednist Plysky	27	(5)
2017–2018	Polissya Zhytomyr	14	(0)
2018–2020	Krystal Kherson	10	(1)
2020–2022	Chernihiv	31	(0)
- * Club domestic league appearances and goals as of 21 August 2022

Maksym Ivanovych Chaus (Ukrainian: Максим Іванович Чаус; born 13 January 1994) is a Ukrainian footballer who plays as a striker.

== Career ==
Chaus was born Chernihiv. He started his youth career with Desna Chernihiv and Olimpik Donetsk. In 2014, he moved to Polissya Dobryanka, LKT-Slavutich Chernihiv, Yunist Polissya Dobryanka and Avangard Korukivka across the Ukrainian lower divisions.

=== Polissya Zhytomyr ===
In 2017 Chaus signed for FC Polissya Zhytomyr in the Ukrainian Second League. On 31 July, he made his debut against Prykarpattia Ivano-Frankivsk. In march 2028 he left the club.

=== Krystal Kherson ===
In summer 2018 Chaus moved to Kherson in the Ukrainian Second League. He made his debut against MFC Mykolaiv-2 on 22 July. On 17 August 2018, he scored his first goal against Real Pharma Odesa at the Krystal Stadium in Kherson.

=== Chernihiv ===
In summer 2020, Chaus moved to FC Chernihiv, which has just been promoted to the Ukrainian Second League. On 24 October, he made his debut against Rubikon Kyiv. On 18 August 2021 he played in the 2021–22 Ukrainian Cup against Chaika Petropavlivska Borshchahivka, helping Chernihiv qualify for the third preliminary round for the first time in club history. On 2 September 2022, he terminated his contract with the club by mutual agreement.

== After retirement ==
In 2022, he founded the children's football team called "Pivnich".

== Personal life ==
His father Ivan Chaus was the president of Desna Chernihiv from 1999 to 2007, the longest serving president in the history of the club.

== Honours ==
Kherson

- Ukrainian Second League: 2019–20
