= Vitaliy Mentey =

Personal information
- Full name: Vitaliy Oleksandrovych Mentey
- Date of birth: 5 August 1992 (age 34)
- Place of birth: Chernihiv, Ukraine
- Height: 1.80 m (5 ft 11 in)
- Position: Midfielder

Youth career
- 2009: Yunist Chernihiv

Senior career*
Years	Team	Apps	(Gls)
2011	Yednist-2 Plysky	5	(0)
2011–2013	Yednist' Plysky	11	(0)
2013–2016	Avangard Korukivka	53	(8)
2016	Polissya Dobryanka	23	(0)
2016–2020	Avangard Korukivka	25	(1)
2020	Kudrivka	5	(0)
2020–2025	Chernihiv	92	(5)
- * Club domestic league appearances and goals as of 22 November 2026

Vitaliy Oleksandrovych Mentey (Ukrainian: Віталій Олександрович Ментей; born 19 April 1992) is a retired Ukrainian footballer who played as a midfielder.

== Career ==
Vitaliy, son of Oleksandr Mentey, was born in the Ukrainian city of Chernihiv and took his first steps as a player at the Yunist Chernihiv sports school in his hometown. In 2009, he moved to Yednist' Plysky in 2013 he moved to Avangard Korukivka and in Polissya Dobryanka.

In summer 2020 he moved to FC Chernihiv in the Ukrainian Second League. On 24 October, he made his debut against Uzhhorod. On 27 August, he scored his first with the new club against Dinaz Vyshhorod in Ukrainian Second League. On 28 November 2020, he scored twice against AFSC Kyiv. Due to his performance in the match against Bukovyna Chernivtsi, he was included in the Best XI of Round 20 of the 2020–21 Ukrainian Second League.

On 18 August 2021, he made his debut in Ukrainian Cup against Chaika Petropavlivska Borshchahivka. On 24 November 2022, following the promotion of the club in Ukrainian First League, he become the captain of the club and he scored his first goal in the Ukrainian First League against Hirnyk-Sport Horishni Plavni in the 46th minute. On 25 May 2024, he scored against Metalist Kharkiv at the Avanhard Stadium in Uzhhorod.Mentey featured regularly for Chernihiv becoming the captain of the club for few years and been replaced only in summer 2024 by Oleksiy Zenchenko. In the summer 2025, his contract expired and was not renewed by the club.

== Personal life ==
He is married with Katia, who followed her husband and cheered him on during his soccer matches. On 18 November 2026, his father, Oleksandr Mentey was killed in Kyiv while working at a construction site, following a Russian bombardment.

== Career statistics ==
=== Club ===
As of match played 22 November 2026

Appearances and goals by club, season and competition
Club	Season	League			Cup		Europe		Other		Total	
Club	Season	Division	Apps	Goals	Apps	Goals	Apps	Goals	Apps	Goals	Apps	Goals
Yednist' Plysky	2011–12	Ukrainian Second League	9	0	0	0	0	0	0	0	9	0
Yednist' Plysky	2012–13	Ukrainian Second League	2	0	0	0	0	0	0	0	2	0
Avangard Korukivka	2013	Ukrainian Amateur League	22	6	0	0	0	0	0	0	22	6
Avangard Korukivka	2014	Ukrainian Amateur League	8	0	0	0	0	0	0	0	8	0
Avangard Korukivka	2015	Ukrainian Amateur League	23	2	0	0	0	0	0	0	23	2
Polissya Dobryanka	2016	Ukrainian Amateur League	23	0	0	0	0	0	0	0	23	0
Avangard Korukivka	2016–17	Ukrainian Amateur League	2	0	0	0	0	0	0	0	2	0
Avangard Korukivka	2017–18	Ukrainian Amateur League	4	0	0	0	0	0	0	0	4	0
Avangard Korukivka	2018–19	Ukrainian Amateur League	7	0	0	0	0	0	0	0	7	0
Avangard Korukivka	2019–20	Ukrainian Amateur League	14	1	0	0	0	0	0	0	14	1
Kudrivka	2020	Kyiv Oblast League	5	0	0	0	0	0	0	0	5	0
Chernihiv	2020–21	Ukrainian Second League	20	0	0	0	0	0	0	0	20	0
Chernihiv	2021–22	Ukrainian Second League	15	3	1	0	0	0	0	0	16	3
Chernihiv	2022–23	Ukrainian First League	18	1	0	0	0	0	0	0	18	1
Chernihiv	2023–24	Ukrainian First League	24	1	1	0	0	0	0	0	25	1
Chernihiv	2024–25	Ukrainian Second League	13	0	2	0	0	0	0	0	15	0
Career total			207	15	5	0	0	0	0	0	211	15

== Honours ==
=== Club ===
Kudrivka

- Kyiv Oblast Football Federation: 2020

Avanhard Kriukivka

- Chernihiv Oblast Football Championship: 2013
- Chernihiv Oblast Football Cup: 2013

Yednist' Plysky 2

- Chernihiv Oblast Football Championship: 2011
