= BC Chernihiv =

Ukrainian professional basketball club

BC Chernihiv БК Чернігів
- Leagues: Ukrainian Higher League
- Founded: 2009
- Arena: OKDYUSSH, prospekt Myru, 44, Chernihiv, Ukraine
- Location: Chernihiv, Ukraine
- President: Stanislav Terletsky
- Head coach: Alexander Khomenko

BC Chernihiv (Ukrainian: БК Чернігів), is a Ukrainian professional basketball club based in Chernihiv, Ukraine. The club plays in the Ukrainian Higher League.

== History ==
BC Chernihiv started in the third season of the Ukrainian Men's First League in its history. In Kyiv, Igor Sachenko's team met with the capital's Predators.

In 2012, BC "Chernihiv" was the winner of the Cup of Chernihiv region in 2012 in basketball among men's teams and the forward of the winners Alexander Gorbachenko was recognized as the best player of the cup.

In 2015, the club won the Dmytro Chabanyuk Memorial, which took place in Chernihiv. He has also repeatedly participated in the championships of the Chernihiv region. In the same year the team become the winner of the Cup of Chernihiv region in basketball and the player of BC Chernihiv, Denis Solodovnikov was elected Best Player.

In the 2017/18 season, the club applied to participate in the Ukrainian men's basketball championship in the First League (the third strongest division of Ukrainian basketball), which broke the almost 15-year break in the performances of teams from Chernihiv region at the All-Ukrainian level.

The team was led by 29-year-old Oleksandr Khomenko, who previously coached the basketball club "North", which plays in the championship of the Chernihiv region. The coach announced a bet on the pupils of Chernihiv basketball and the goal to enter the top three teams of the First League following the results of the debut season.

BC Chernihiv won its first victory at the All-Ukrainian level in the first match of the First League. On 28 October 2017, Chernihiv beat Kyiv-Basket 89–69.

However, a series of 6 consecutive defeats followed. BC Chernihiv lost twice in the first home matches of the First League: on 9 and 10 December 2017 on its floor the club lost to BC Zhytomyr 83-90 and 87–89, despite the fact that three minutes before the end of the second match led in the score with an advantage of 8 points.

BC Chernihiv won its first home victory in the First League on 16 December 2017 in overtime, beating BC Mayak (Sarny) 94–90.

On 21 November 2020, the team won 83 - 86 against BC Rivne-Osdushor. On 22 November 2020, the team won 54 - 62 away against BC Rivne-Osdushor.

== Facilities ==
The club plays in OKDYUSSH Arena, located in prospekt Myru, 44, Chernihiv, Ukraine

== Honours ==
- Cup of Chernihiv region: 2012
- Cup of Chernihiv region: 2015

== Season by season ==
Champions	Runners-up	Promoted	Playoff berth

Season	Tier	League	Finish	Wins	Losses	Win%	Playoffs	Other competitions	Head coach
BC Chernihiv
2022–23	2	Higher League						–	

== See also ==
- List of sport teams in Chernihiv
- List of Chernihiv Sport Teams
