= Nivaldo (footballer, born June 1988) =

Brazilian footballer

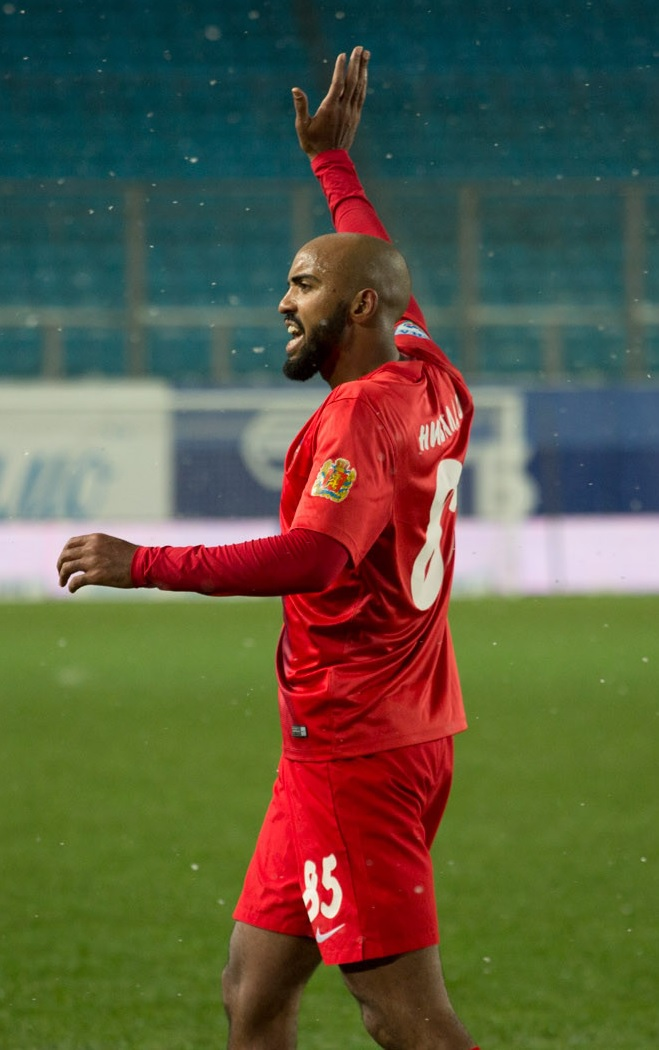
- With Yenisey Krasnoyarsk in 2016

Personal information
- Full name: Nivaldo Rodrigues Ferreira
- Date of birth: 22 June 1988 (age 38)
- Place of birth: Iati, Pernambuco, Brazil
- Height: 1.85 m (6 ft 1 in)
- Position: Forward

Team information
- Current team: ASHVILLE

Senior career*
Years	Team	Apps	(Gls)
2008–2010	Baraúnas		
2010	Alecrim	5	(1)
2011–2012	Atyrau	33	(1)
2013–2014	Sibir Novosibirsk	22	(2)
2014–2016	Luch-Energiya Vladivostok	59	(8)
2016	Yenisey Krasnoyarsk	6	(0)
2017	Gomel	13	(5)
2017–2018	Dinamo Brest	21	(5)
2018	→ Lokomotiv Tashkent (loan)	7	(1)
2019	Gomel	27	(3)
2020	Gudja United	6	(1)
2020	Belshina Bobruisk	16	(1)
2020	Isloch Minsk Raion	3	(0)
2021–2022	Chaika Petropavlivska Borshchahivka	14	(0)
2022–2023	Radcliffe	9	(1)
2022–2023	→ Bootle (loan)	22	(5)
2023–2024	City of Liverpool	?	(?)
2024–	Barnton	?	(?)
2025–	Ashville	12	(1)
- * Club domestic league appearances and goals as of 1 December 2025

Player profile Nivaldo Rodrigues Ferreira (born 22 June 1988), known as Nivaldo, is a Brazilian footballer who plays as a forward for English club Ashville.

== Career ==
=== Early career ===
On 16 August 2012, Nivaldo played on trial for FC Ufa reserve team. In July 2013, Nivaldo joined Sibir Novosibirsk, going on to make his debut for them in the Russian Football League against FC Ufa. On 14 August 2014, Nivaldo signed for Luch-Energiya Vladivostok. On 25 August 2016, Nivaldo signed a one-year contract with Yenisey Krasnoyarsk. Nivaldo was released by Yenisey on 31 January 2017.

=== Lokomotiv Tashkent ===
On 1 February 2018, Nivaldo signed on loan for Lokomotiv Tashkent until 30 June 2018.

=== SC Chaika ===
In summer 2021 he moved to SC Chaika, in Ukrainian Second League and on 14 July 2021 he scored two goals for SC Chaika in the friendly match against FC Chernihiv in Plysky ended 3–0. On 25 July he made his debut with the new team in the 2021–22 Ukrainian Second League season against Bukovyna Chernivtsi. On 18 August he made his debut in the 2021–22 Ukrainian Cup against FC Chernihiv.

=== Radcliffe ===
On 12 August 2022 he moved to English club Radcliffe of the Northern Premier League. He would make nine appearances for the club including scoring a winning goal against FC United.

==== Bootle (loan) ====
In October 2022, Nivaldo signed for Bootle on loan.

=== City of Liverpool ===
On 23 August 2023, Northern Premier League Division One West team City of Liverpool, announced the signing of Nivaldo.

== Personal life ==
Nivaldo is married to Ukrainian Tennis player Anna Karavayeva, with whom he has three children.

Nivaldo was living outside of Kyiv during the February 2022 Russian invasion of Ukraine. As soon as they could hear bombing in the morning of 24 February Nivaldo and his wife loaded their family car and drove three days straight to Poland. After two months of waiting, the family was approved to move to the United Kingdom through the Ukraine Family Scheme.

== Career statistics ==
=== Club ===
As of match played 3 March 2023

Appearances and goals by club, season and competition
Club	Season	League			National Cup		Continental		Other		Total	
Club	Season	Division	Apps	Goals	Apps	Goals	Apps	Goals	Apps	Goals	Apps	Goals
Alecrim	2010	Série C	5	1	0	0	-		-		5	1
Atyrau	2011	Kazakhstan Premier League	28	1	1	0	-		-		29	1
Atyrau	2012	Kazakhstan Premier League	5	0	0	0	-		-		5	0
Atyrau	Total		33	1	1	0	-	-	-	-	34	1
Sibir Novosibirsk	2013–14	Russian National League	22	2	1	0	-		-		23	2
Luch-Energiya Vladivostok	2014–15	Russian National League	26	2	2	0	-		-		28	2
Luch-Energiya Vladivostok	2015–16	Russian National League	27	6	0	0	-		-		27	6
Luch-Energiya Vladivostok	2016–17	Russian National League	6	0	0	0	-		-		6	0
Luch-Energiya Vladivostok	Total		59	8	2	0	-	-	-	-	61	8
Yenisey Krasnoyarsk	2016–17	Russian National League	6	0	0	0	-		-		6	0
Gomel	2017	Belarusian Premier League	13	5	0	0	-		-		13	5
Dinamo Brest	2017	Belarusian Premier League	13	2	1	0	2	0	-		16	2
Dinamo Brest	2018	Belarusian Premier League	8	2	1	0	3	0	-		12	2
Dinamo Brest	Total		21	4	2	0	5	0	-	-	28	4
Lokomotiv Tashkent (loan)	2018	Uzbekistan Super League	7	1	1	0	5	2	-		13	3
Gomel	2019	Belarusian Premier League	27	3	2	1	-		-		29	4
Gudja United	2019–20	Maltese Premier League	6	1	2	0	-		-		8	1
Belshina Bobruisk	2020	Belarusian Premier League	16	1	1	0	-		-		17	1
Isloch Minsk	2020	Belarusian Premier League	3	0	0	0	-		-		3	0
SC Chaika	2021–22	Ukrainian Second League	14	0	1	0	0	0	0	0	15	0
Radcliffe	2022–23	English Northern Premier League	9	1	0	0	0	0	0	0	9	0
Bootle (Loan)	2022–23	English Northern Premier League	22	5	0	0	0	0	0	0	22	5
Career total			263	33	13	1	10	2	-	-	253	29

== Honours ==
Dinamo Brest

- Belarusian Cup: 2017–18
- Belarusian Super Cup: 2018
