= Andriy Polyanytsya =

Ukrainian retired footballer

Personal information
- Full name: Andriy Mykolayovych Polyanytsya
- Date of birth: 24 January 1982 (age 44)
- Place of birth: Chernihiv, Ukrainian SSR, USSR
- Height: 1.84 m (6 ft 0 in)
- Position: Defender

Youth career
- 1999: Desna Chernihiv

Senior career*
Years	Team	Apps	(Gls)
1999–2002	Desna Chernihiv	67	(3)
2002	Lukor Kalush	1	(0)
2002–2004	Spartak Ivano-Frankivsk	34	(3)
2003	→ Spartak-2 Kalush	1	(0)
2004	Metalurh-2 Zaporizhzhia	12	(0)
2004–2005	Spartak Ivano-Frankivsk	17	(0)
2005	→ Metalurh-2 Zaporizhzhia	12	(1)
2005–2006	→ Stal Kamianske (loan)	14	(0)
2006–2008	Krymteplytsia Molodizhne	34	(0)
2008–2009	Feniks-Illichovets Kalinine	11	(1)
2009–2010	Naftovyk-Ukrnafta Okhtyrka	9	(0)
2010–2011	Poltava	10	(1)
2011	Desna Chernihiv	7	(1)
2011–2012	Shakhtar Sverdlovsk	22	(1)
2012–2013	Poltava-2-Karlivka	31	(2)
2013–2014	Shakhtar Sverdlovsk	23	(2)
2014–2015	Polissya Dobryanka	12	(0)
2015–2016	Avanhard Koryukivka	70	(3)
2016	Polissya Dobryanka	70	(3)
2016–2020	Avanhard Koryukivka	70	(3)

Managerial career
- 2022–: Desna Chernihiv (youth)
- 2022–2026: Chernihiv (assistant)
- 2026–: Chernihiv (interim)
- * Club domestic league appearances and goals as of 24 August 2026

Andriy Mykolayovych Polyanytsya (Ukrainian: Андрій Миколайович Поляниця; born 24 January 1982) is a retired Ukrainian professional footballer who played as a defender and current coach of Chernihiv.

== Playing career ==
=== Desna Chernihiv ===
Andriy Polyanytsya started his career in 1999 with Desna Chernihiv, where he played 67 matches and scored three goals.

=== Lukor Kalush and Spartak Ivano-Frankivsk ===
In 2002, he moved to Lukor Kalush, before moving to Spartak Ivano-Frankivsk the following season.

=== Stal Kamianske ===
In 2005 he moved to Stal Kamianske for two seasons, where he played 14 matches.

=== Krymteplytsia Molodizhne ===
In 2006 he moved to Krymteplytsia Molodizhne in Crimea, playing 34 matches over two seasons.

=== Feniks-Illichovets Kalinine and Naftovyk-Ukrnafta Okhtyrka ===
In 2008 he played 11 matches and scored 1 goal for Feniks-Illichovets Kalinine and 9 matches with Naftovyk-Ukrnafta Okhtyrka.

=== Poltava ===
In summer 2010 he moved to Poltava where he played 10 matches and scored 1 goal.

=== Return to Desna Chernihiv ===
In January 2011, he moved to Desna Chernihiv where he played 7 matches.

=== Shakhtar Sverdlovsk and Poltava-2-Karlivka ===
The following summer, he moved to Shakhtar Sverdlovsk, playing 22 matches and scoring 1 goal before moving to Poltava-2-Karlivka for the 2012–13 season.

=== Return to Shakhtar Sverdlovsk ===
In 2013 he moved back to Shakhtar Sverdlovsk, where he played 23 matches and scored 2 goals.

=== Polissya Dobryanka and Avanhard Koryukivka ===
In 2014 he played 3 matches for Polissya Dobryanka youth side after which he moved to Avanhard Koryukivka, where he played 70 matches and scored 3 goals.

== Coaching career ==
=== Chernihiv ===
In August 2022 he was appointed assistant coach of Chernihiv. On 4 June 2025, he led the team as coach in the second leg of the play-offs against Skala Stryi at the Sokil Stadium. On 20 May 2026, he led the team during the 2026 Ukrainian Cup final against Dynamo Kyiv at the Arena Lviv in Lviv. On 24 August 2026, he was appointed interim head coach of FC Chernihiv, replacing Vasyl Baranov.

== Managerial statistics ==
As of match played 5 September 2026

Managerial record by team and tenure
Team	Nat	From	To	Record								Ref
Team	Nat	From	To	G	W	D	L	GF	GA	GD	Win %	Ref
Chernihiv	(Ukraine)	August 2026	present	2	1	0	1	1	1	+0	50.00	
Total				2	1	0	1	1	1	+0	50.00	—

== Honours ==
=== As Player ===
FC Kalush

- Ukrainian Second League: 2002–03 (Group A)

Desna Chernihiv

- Ukrainian Second League runner-up: 2000–01 (Group C)

FC Poltava

- Ukrainian Second League runner-up: 2010–11 (Group B)

=== Assistant coach ===
Chernihiv

- Ukrainian Cup runner-up: 2025–26
