= Maksym Hirnyi =

Ukrainian footballer

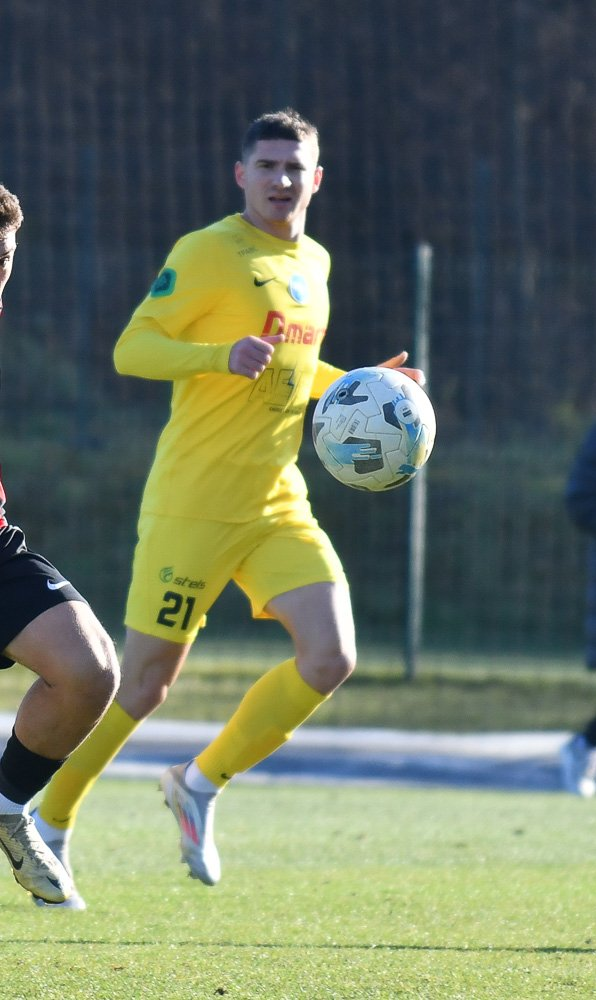

Personal information
- Full name: Maksym Andriyovych Hirnyi
- Date of birth: 6 April 2001 (age 25)
- Place of birth: Lviv, Ukraine
- Height: 1.84 m (6 ft 0 in)
- Position: Forward

Team information
- Current team: Probiy Horodenka
- Number: 21

Youth career
- –2019: Karpaty Lviv
- 2020: Michalovce

Senior career*
Years	Team	Apps	(Gls)
2020–2021	Zemplín Michalovce	5	(0)
2021	Munkach Mukachevo	16	(9)
2022	Uzhhorod	0	(0)
2022–2024	Epitsentr Kamianets-Podilskyi	38	(14)
2024–2025	Bukovyna Chernivtsi	9	(0)
2025	Bukovyna-2 Chernivtsi	10	(1)
2026–	Probiy Horodenka	8	(0)

International career
2019	Ukraine U19	1	(1)
- * Club domestic league appearances and goals as of 4 June 2026

Maksym Andriyovych Hirnyi (Ukrainian: Максим Андрійович Гірний; born 6 April 2001) is a professional Ukrainian footballer who currently plays for the Ukrainian club Probiy Horodenka as a forward.

== Club career ==
=== MFK Zemplín Michalovce ===
Hirnyi made his Fortuna Liga debut for Zemplín Michalovce against Slovan Bratislava on 11 August 2020.
