= Valeriy Chornyi =

Ukrainian footballer

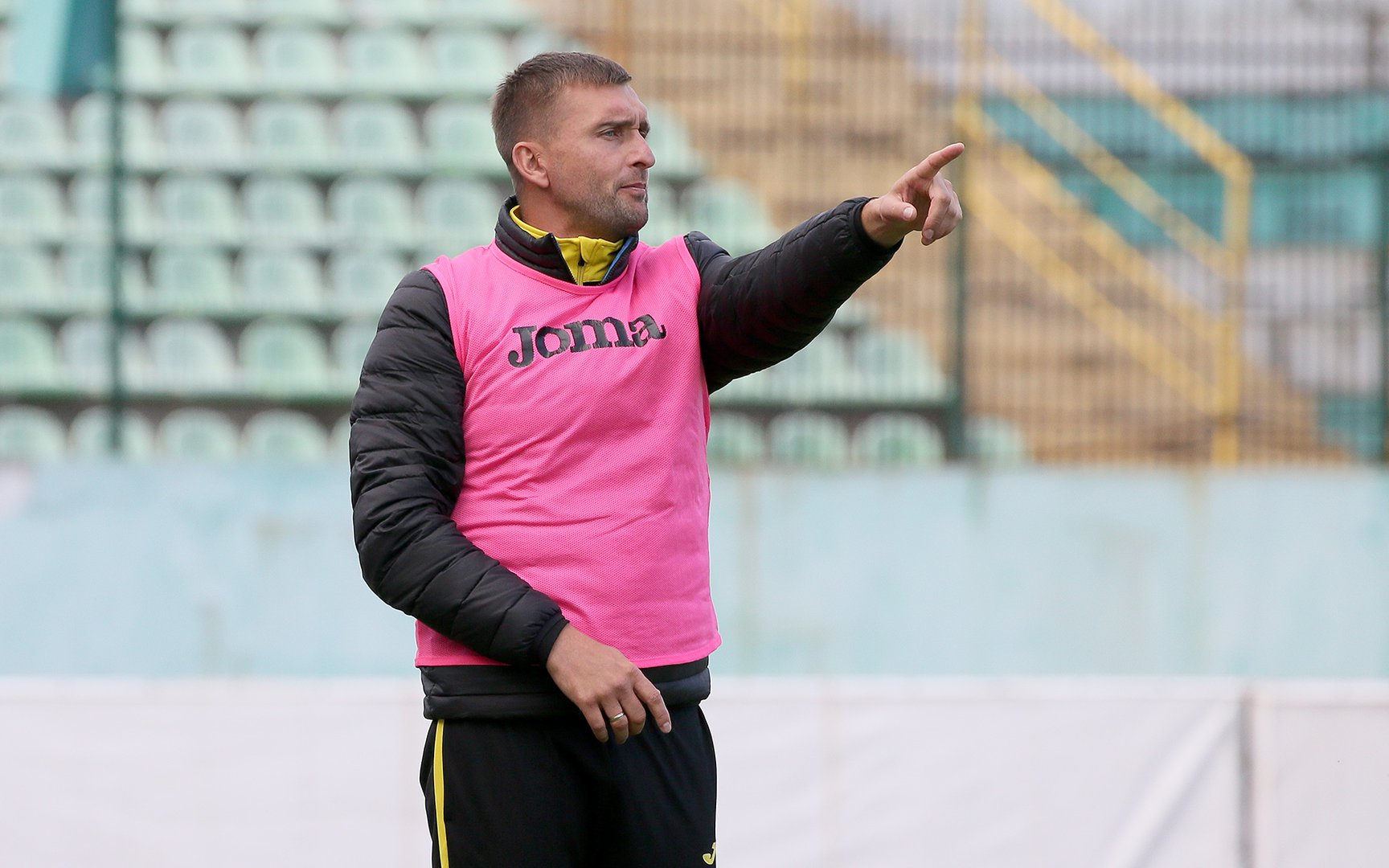

Personal information
- Full name: Valeriy Anatoliyovych Chornyi
- Date of birth: 2 July 1982 (age 44)
- Place of birth: Chernihiv, Soviet Union (now Ukraine)
- Height: 1.66 m (5 ft 5 in)
- Position: Defender

Youth career
- 1999: Desna Chernihiv

Senior career*
Years	Team	Apps	(Gls)
1999–2000	Desna Chernihiv	0	(0)
2004	Interahrosystema Mena	4	(0)
2004–2006	Metalurh-2 Zaporizhzhia	16	(1)
2005–2006	Spartak Sumy	12	(1)
2006–2007	Enerhetyk Burshtyn	9	(0)
2007–2008	Arsenal Bila Tserkva	3	(0)
2007–2008	Desna Chernihiv	14	(0)
2009	Polissya Dobryanka	0	(0)
2010–2018	Avanhard Koriukivka	13	(0)

Managerial career
- 2010–2020: Avanhard Koriukivka
- 2021–2026: Chernihiv (Coach)
- 2026–: Chernihiv (Sport director)
- * Club domestic league appearances and goals

Valeriy Anatoliyovych Chornyi (Ukrainian: Валерій Анатолійович Чорний; born 2 July 1982) is a Ukrainian football manager and former player.

== Playing career ==
Valeriy Chornyi, started his career in youth team of Desna Chernihiv, then played for Mena. In 2004 he moved to Metalurh-2, and he played as a defender and midfielder for two seasons. In 2005 he moved to Spartak Sumy, moving to Enerhetyk Burshtyn and then to Arsenal Kyivshchyna Bila Tserkva in 2006. In following season, he moved back to Desna Chernihiv. He finished his career with Avangard Korukivka, where he started as a player-coach and then as head coach.

== Coaching career ==
=== Avangard Korukivka ===
He managed Avangard Korukivka from 2010 to 2020.

=== FC Chernihiv ===
On 21 April 2021 he was appointed as interim coach of FC Chernihiv, replacing Vadym Postovoy. He managed to lead the team to 10th place in the 2020–21 Ukrainian Second League.

In summer 2024, after the team's relegation to the Ukrainian Second League, Mykola Synytsya, the club's general director, announced that Valeriy would remain in his position as coach.

In 2025, he led FC Chernihiv to 2nd place in Group B, earning promotion to the Ukrainian First League.

The following season, Valeriy guided FC Chernihiv to the round of 4 of the Ukrainian Cup for the first time in the club's history.

On 14 June 2026, due to family reasons, he resigned as head coach and appointed as Sport Director.

== Career statistics ==
=== Club ===
As of match played 29 April 2026

Appearances and goals by club, season and competition
Club	Season	League			Cup		Europe		Other		Total	
Club	Season	Division	Apps	Goals	Apps	Goals	Apps	Goals	Apps	Goals	Apps	Goals
Metalurh-2 Zaporizhzhia	2004–05	Ukrainian Second League	14	1	0	0	0	0	0	0	14	1
Metalurh-2 Zaporizhzhia	2005–06	Ukrainian Second League	2	0	0	0	0	0	0	0	2	0
Spartak Sumy	2004–05	Ukrainian Second League	12	1	0	0	0	0	0	0	12	1
Enerhetyk Burshtyn	2006–07	Ukrainian Second League	9	0	1	0	0	0	0	0	10	0
Arsenal Bila Tserkva	2007–08	Ukrainian Second League	3	0	0	0	0	0	0	0	3	0
Desna Chernihiv	2007–08	Ukrainian First League	14	0	2	0	0	0	0	0	16	0
Avanhard Koriukivka	2011	Chernihiv Oblast League	0	0	0	0	0	0	0	0	0	0
Avanhard Koriukivka	2012	Chernihiv Oblast League	4	0	0	0	0	0	0	0	4	0
Avanhard Koriukivka	2013	Ukrainian Amateur League	4	0	0	0	0	0	0	0	4	0
Avanhard Koriukivka	2014	Ukrainian Amateur League	0	0	0	0	0	0	0	0	0	0
Avanhard Koriukivka	2015	Ukrainian Amateur League	4	0	0	0	0	0	0	0	4	0
Avanhard Koriukivka	2016	Ukrainian Amateur League	0	0	0	0	0	0	0	0	0	0
Avanhard Koriukivka	2016–17	Ukrainian Amateur League	1	0	0	0	0	0	0	0	1	0
Career total			67	2	3	0	0	0	0	0	69	2

=== Managerial statistics ===
As of 29 April 2026

Team	From	To	Record				
Team	From	To	G	W	D	L	Win %
Chernihiv	21 April 2021	29 April 2026		38	28	51	32.76
Total				38	28	51	32.76

== Honours ==
=== Manager ===
Avanhard Koryukivka

- Chernihiv Oblast Football Championship: 2007, 2012, 2013
- Chernihiv Oblast Football Cup: 2011, 2013

Chernihiv

- Ukrainian Cup runner-up: 2025–26
