= Volodymyr Stolyar =

Ukrainian footballer

Personal information
- Full name: Volodymyr Oleksiyovych Stolyar
- Date of birth: 23 April 2003 (age 23)
- Place of birth: Zhytomyr, Ukraine
- Height: 1.70 m (5 ft 7 in)
- Position: Central midfielder

Team information
- Current team: Bukovyna Chernivtsi
- Number: 23

Youth career
- 2015–2017: Polissya Zhytomyr
- 2017–2021: Bukovyna Chernivtsi

Senior career*
Years	Team	Apps	(Gls)
2020	Fazenda Chernivtsi	0	(0)
2020–	Bukovyna Chernivtsi	37	(1)
2021	→ Kolos Kovalivka (loan)	0	(0)
- * Club domestic league appearances and goals as of 13 June 2023

Volodymyr Oleksiyovych Stolyar (Ukrainian: Володимир Олексійович Столяр; born 23 April 2003) is a Ukrainian professional footballer who plays as a central midfielder for Ukrainian First League club Bukovyna Chernivtsi.
