= Mykola Synytsya =

Mykola Yurievich Synytsya

General director of FC Chernihiv
- Incumbent
- Assumed office 7 December 2003

Personal details
- Born: 26 April 1988 (age 38) Chernihiv, Chernihiv Oblast, Ukraine
- Children: 2

Mykola Yurievich Synytsya (Ukrainian: Микола Юрійович Синиця; born 26 April 1988) is a Ukrainian businessman, Chief Executive Officer of Collar Company and General Director of the football club FC Chernihiv.

== Biography ==
Synytsya was born in the city of Chernihiv, Ukrainian SSR, Soviet Union.

=== Collar Company ===
COLLAR Company is a Ukrainian manufacturer of innovative products for pets, exporting pet products to 78 countries around the world. Recently the company started to cooperate with Amazon in order to use this channel to sell the products not sold in Ukraine. The company also started to cooperate with NASA where it agreed on the designs for new accessories: leashes, business cards, tape measures, bracelets and address books.

=== General director of FC Chernihiv ===
In July 2022, Mykola together with his brother managed to sign several players, including Vyacheslav Koydan, Volodymyr Zubashivskyi, Vladyslav Shkolnyi, Oleksandr Rudenko, Myroslav Serdyuk, Dmytro Kulyk, Eduard Halstyan and Mykola Syrash.

Despite the club's relegation to the Ukrainian Second League, he announced that the team's coach, Valeriy Chornyi, would remain in his position. The club was reinforced by signing Maksym Tatarenko, Andriy Porokhnya, Anatoliy Romanchenko and Maksym Serdyuk, the latter on loan from Livyi Bereh Kyiv. Following FC Chernihiv's promotion to the Ukrainian First League, Mykola, as General Manager of the club, received congratulations and high praise from Oleksandr Kadenko, President of the PFL, during the club's awards ceremony.

On 21 September 2025, during the Chernihiv City Day celebrations, the match between FC Chernihiv and Metalist Kharkiv was postponed due to a prolonged alarm. After an hour-long wait, the Kharkiv club decided not to play, considering the situation dangerous. Mykola admitted in an interview that his team waited for the visiting team to return to the field but to no avail.

== Under Investigation ==
On 8 October 2025, he was suspected of falsifying employee data, organizing a scheme to book fictitious players. Mykola admitted his fault, but he said that acted only with good intentions, as the FC Chernihiv represents the city and allows more than 400 children to study in the border region. He was not aware of the damage he had caused and that he was ready to cooperate with the justice. Prosecutor Serhiy Domashenko requested that Sinytsia will be held in pretrial detention without bail suspecting that he could evade investigations, having been exempted from military service for reasons of health. Mykola said that he has no intention of leaving or hiding anywhere, that if he had such ideas, he would have left earlier during the outbreak of the war and that he will continue to cooperate with the investigation.
