= SDYuShOR Desna =

Association football club in Chernihiv, Ukraine

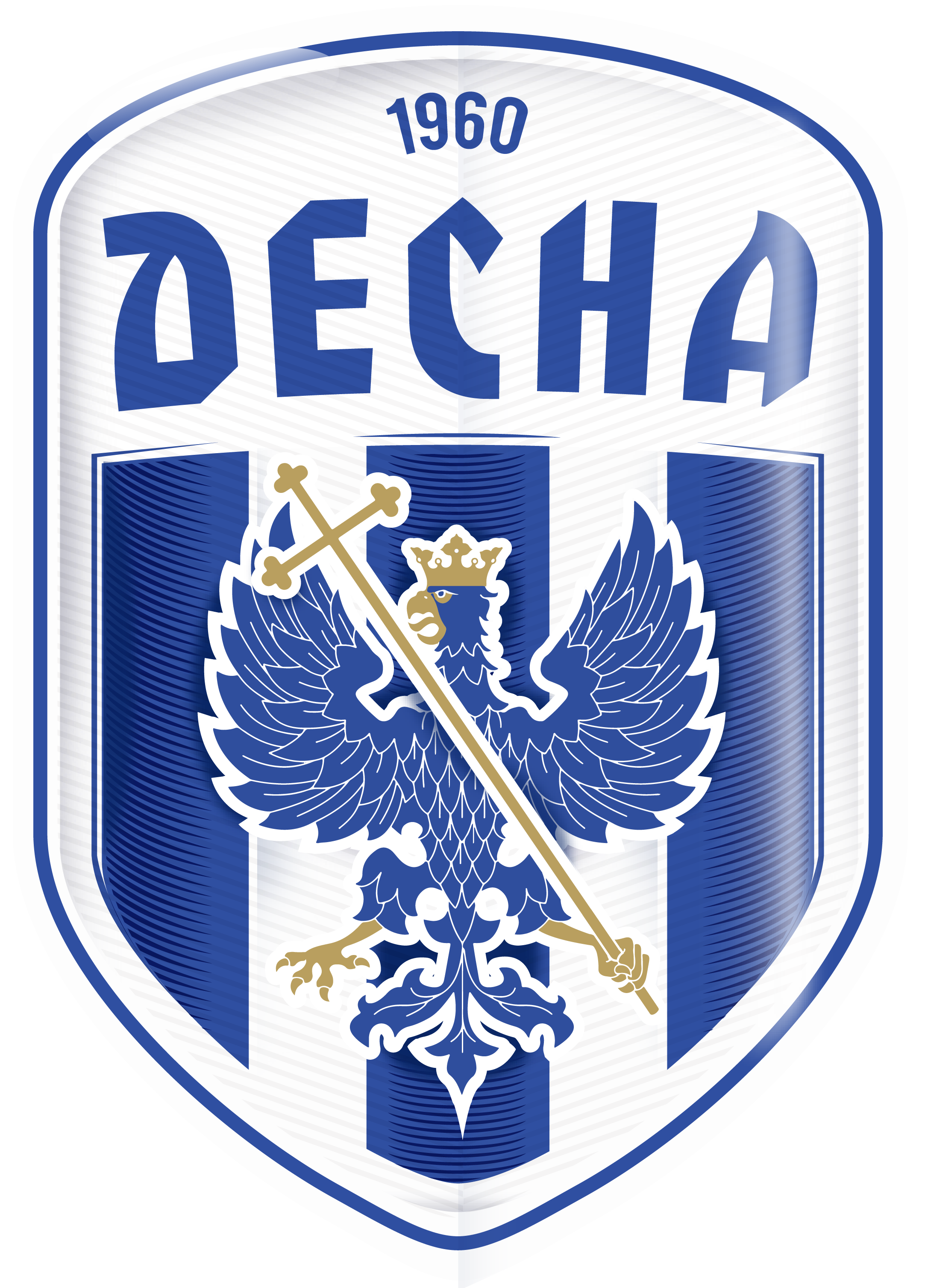
- Full name: Special Children-Youth School of Olympic Reserve "Desna"
- Nickname: Siveriany
- Ground: Chernihiv Stadium; Chernihiv Arena
- Capacity: 12,060; 500
- Chairman: Volodymyr Levin
- Manager: Andriy Polyanytsya
- Website: https://www.desna.football/dyusshor/

SDYuShOR Desna (Ukrainian: СДЮШОР «Десна») is a Ukrainian specialized children and youth sports school with a status of the Olympic-level training based in Chernihiv. The sports school serves as a football academy for Desna Chernihiv.

The sports school fields several youth teams of various age categories at the Ukrainian Youth Football League.

== Stadium and facilities ==
The team plays in the Olympic Sports Training Center of Chernihiv (formerly Stadion Yuri Gagarin). The stadium was built in 1936 for 3,000 spectators in the eastern portion of a city park built in 1804. During World War II, the stadium was heavily damaged, and in the 1950s, it was completely reconstructed, including two stands for 11,000 spectators. In 1961, it was named after the Russian Soviet cosmonaut Yuri Gagarin. FC Desna Chernihiv also plays at the stadium.

== Notable alumni and players ==
- Andriy Yarmolenko is one of the main players who graduated from the SDYuShOR Desna academy.
- Oleksandr Pyshchur playing for Győr in Hungary, was graduated from the SDYuShOR Desna academy.

== Managers ==
- 2008: Mykhaylo Yarmoshenko
- 2010: Maksym Markelov
- 2015: Artem Padun
- 2020: Volodymyr Matsuta
- 2020–2021: Mykhaylo Yarmoshenko
- 2021–2022: Volodymyr Matsuta
- 2022–: Andriy Polyanytsya

== Honours ==
- Obolon Cup
  - Winners (1): 2022

== See also ==
- List of Chernihiv Sport Teams
- FC Desna Chernihiv
- FC Desna-2 Chernihiv
- FC Desna-3 Chernihiv
- FC Chernihiv
