= FC Chernihiv =

Professional football club based in Chernihiv, Ukraine

Chernihiv
- Full name: Football Club Chernihiv
- Nickname: Tigers
- Founded: December 7, 2003; 22 years ago
- Ground: Yunist Stadium; Chernihiv Arena
- Capacity: 500
- Owner: Yuriy Synytsya
- Director: Mykola Synytsya
- Manager: Andriy Polyanytsya
- League: Ukrainian First League
- 2025–26: Ukrainian First League, 13th of 16
- Website: http://chernigiv.ua/
Home colours	Away colours

Football Club Chernihiv (Ukrainian: ФК Чернігів), also known as Football Club Chernigiv, is a Ukrainian professional football club based in Chernihiv that currently plays in the Ukrainian First League.

== History ==
=== Founding and establishment ===
Today's club was established on 18 June 2003 by Yuriy Synytsya, a businessman in the city of Chernihiv. The original name of the club was "YSB Chernihiv," and it played at the Military Lyceum in Chernihiv. In September 2012, the club won the Super Cup of Chernihiv Oblast and the Chernihiv Oblast Football Cup. In 2013, the club made its debut in the 2013 Ukrainian Football Amateur League.

=== Stadium investment ===
There have been significant investments for the club, particularly regarding the team's new stadium Chernihiv Arena. In the summer of 2016, the first construction work started and after 11 months, in May 2017, the football field, the building with changing rooms and showers, all communications, roads, parking lots were ready to receive visitors. Also the Chernihiv city Mayor Vladyslav Atroshenko, addressing the investor of this project, Yuriy Synytsya, noted that the idea of building this facility at his own expense is worthy of admiration and imitation.

=== Ukrainian Amateur League ===
In 2018, the club competed in Championship and finished in fourth place. During the summer transfer session, few young players such as Bohdan Lazarenko, Dmytro Kulyk arrives and Oleksandr Roshchynskyi, Artem Lutchenko and Mikita Falko were released in winter. The club won the Chernihiv Oblast Football Federation in 2019. In the season 2019–20, the club played also in Ukrainian Football Amateur League.

=== Promotion to Ukrainian Second League ===
In 2020 the club competed in the Ukrainian Second League. The club was supported by the management and some important players arrived, including the experienced goalkeeper Anatoliy Tymofeyev. and the experienced player Vyacheslav Koydan. In April 2021 Vadym Postovoy resigned as coach and appointed as coach of the young team. As a coach was appointed Valeriy Chornyi as interim. In summer 2021, the club started train in the Khimik Sport Complex. The team reached the third preliminary round of 2021–22 Ukrainian Cup, winning against Chaika by penalty in Makariv and after losing to Alians Lypova Dolyna 1–5 in Chernihiv Arena.

=== Chernihiv Arena Damaged ===
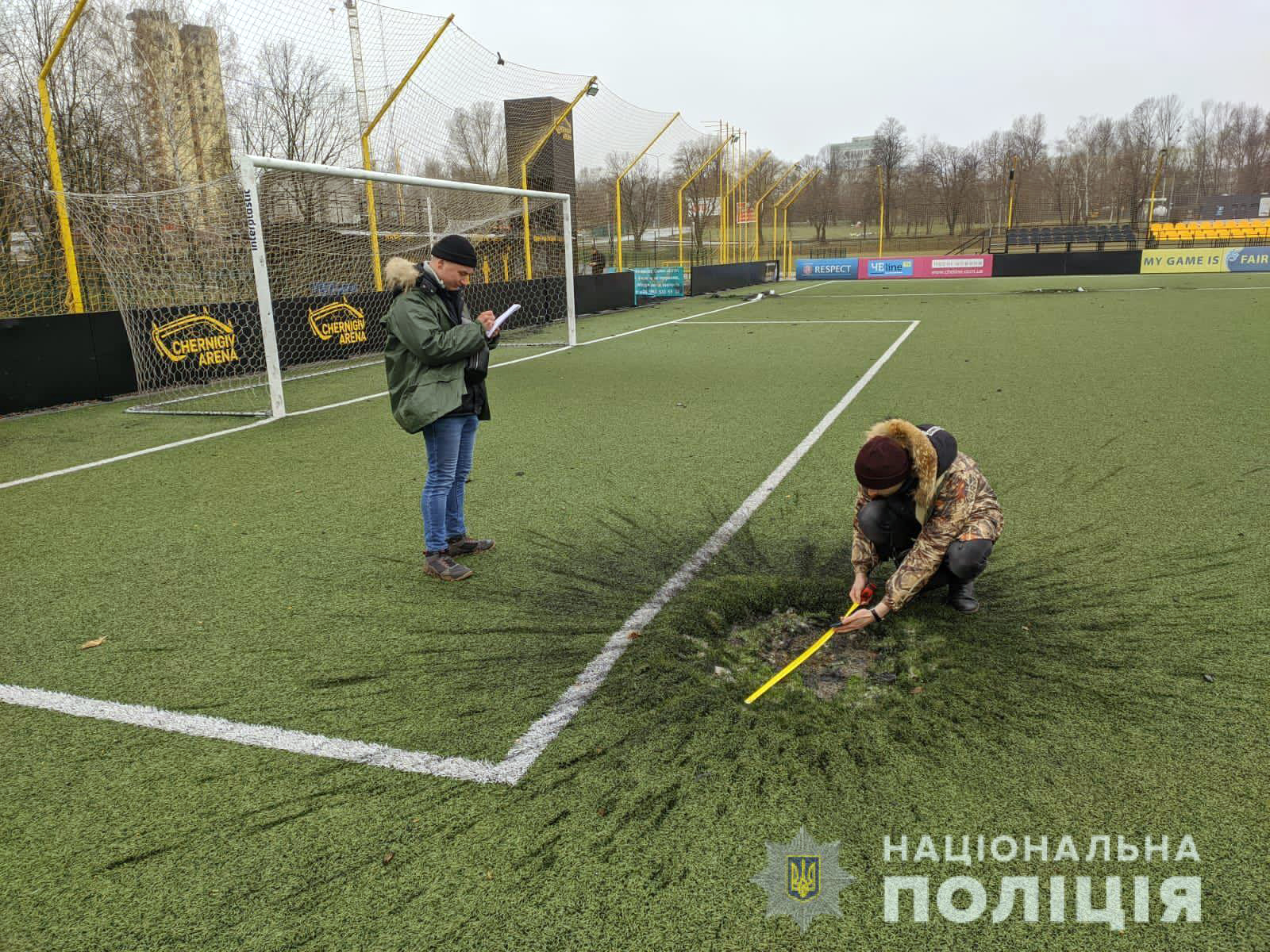
A scar from the shelling

In 2021, the club started train in the Khimik Sport Complex with the task of also re-evaluating the sports facility. During the season the club was admitted in Ukrainian Cup and its reached the Third preliminary round of 2021–22 Ukrainian Cup, winning to Chaika by penalty, in Makariv, but after the club lost against Alians Lypova Dolyna 1–5, in Chernihiv Arena. The club was quite confident and in the winter break season it was at the 10th position in the league, he competition was terminated at the PFL Council meeting on 6 May 2022 due to the 2022 Russian invasion of Ukraine. On 9 March 2022, during the Siege of Chernihiv, the Chernihiv Arena was damaged, as well as part of the administrative building and locker rooms, the box office, the fan shop and the stele, which boasts the name of the stadium.

=== Promotion to Ukrainian First League ===
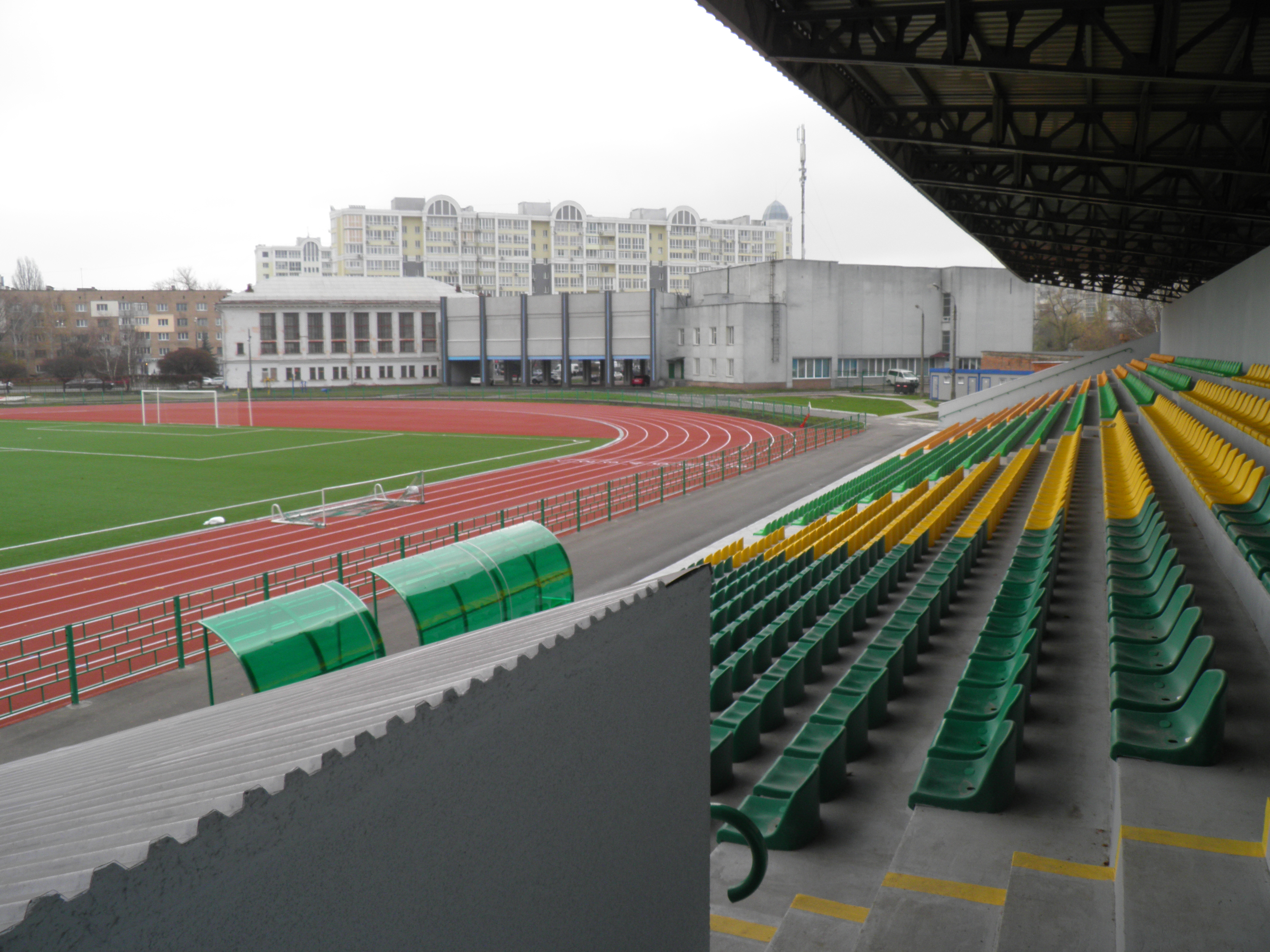
Yunist Stadium, used by the club since 2023

In 2022 after much speculation, it became official that the club was admitted to Ukrainian First League for the first time in its history. Due to the destruction of Chernihiv Arena, the club was forced to use the stadium Yunist Stadium. The club to reinforce the team signed several players, including Vladyslav Panko, Vyacheslav Koydan, Volodymyr Zubashivskyi, Vladyslav Shkolnyi, Oleksandr Rudenko, Myroslav Serdyuk, Roman Vovk, Dmytro Kulyk and Mykola Syrash. The club's first victory was against Metalurh Zaporizhzhia in Zaporizhzhia. Unexpectedly, the contracts of some players who had distinguished themselves in the previous season were interrupted, in an attempt to launch young players. Unfortunately, this strategy was not the right one and the club's defense was not good and by the middle of the league, the team was already in the last positions. In October 2023, Artem Strilets was called up to the Ukraine national student football team, playing 4 matches and becoming the first player from the club to play for one of the Ukrainian national football teams. The club finished the 2023–24 FC Chernihiv season in 19th place and was relegated to the Ukrainian Second League.

=== Reorganization & Promotion ===
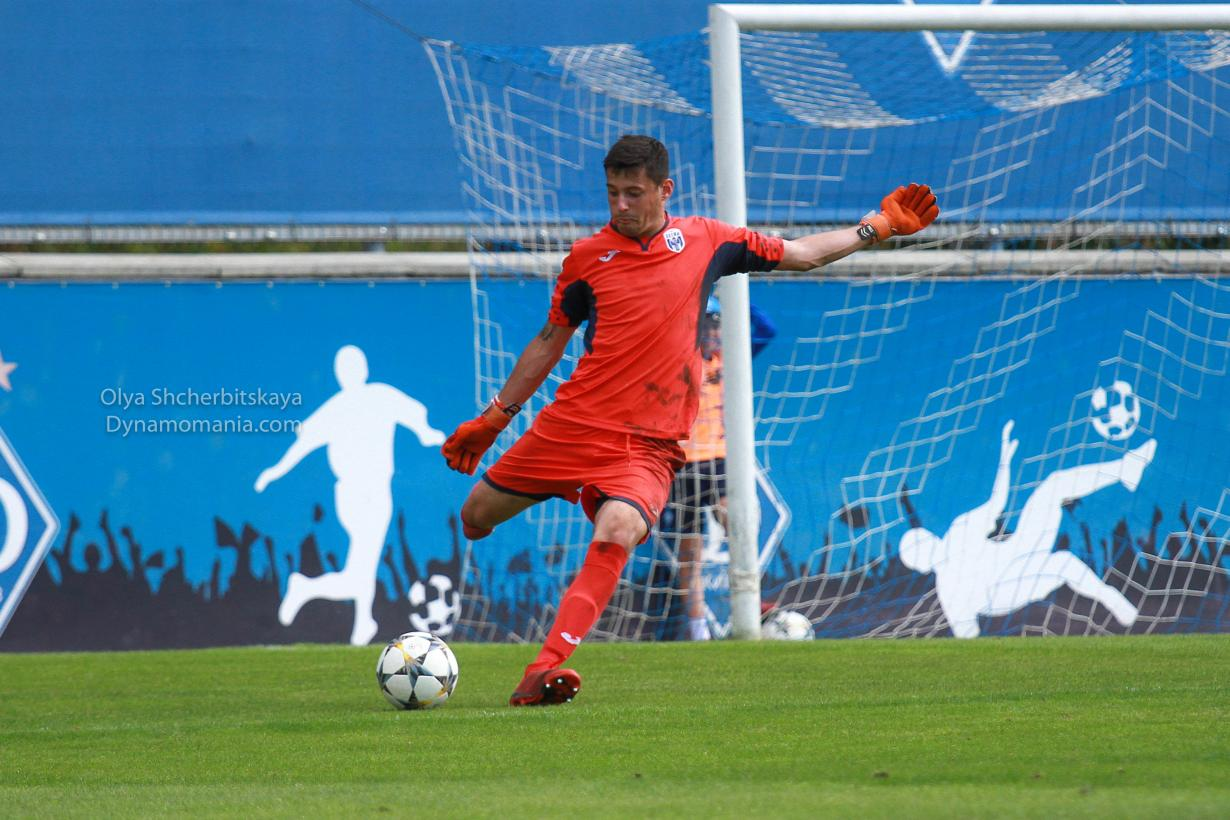
In 2024 Maksym Tatarenko, signed for the club

In September 2024, a new important investment was done by the management of the club with the construction of a new full-size artificial field with a modern and high-quality coating at Chernihiv Arena. FC Chernihiv reached the third preliminary round of the 2024–25 Ukrainian Cup. On 12 August the club lost against Viktoriya Sumy 0–1 and was knocked out of the competition. In the first match of the league, the club started well, winning the first match 8–2 against Metalist 1925-2 Kharkiv During the winter market, the management, in order to reinforce the club and bring it to the top positions in the league, released some players, in particular Kyrylo Kryvoborodenko, who had played for the club for 11 years. The club signed few experienced players including Dmytro Kulyk, Dmytro Fatyeyev, Andriy Novikov, Pavlo Shushko, Yehor Shalfeyev and Yehor Kartushov. On April 19, 2025, the club returns to the Chernihiv Arena after more than three years in a match against Nyva Vinnytsia for the Ukrainian Second League. Maksym Tatarenko was nominated best goalkeeper in the Ukrainian Second League, ahead of Dmitry Mikheev and Ivan Pitsan. The club returned to Ukrainian First League, after FC Chernihiv won the 2024–25 Ukrainian Second League playoffs.

=== Ukrainian Cup Final ===
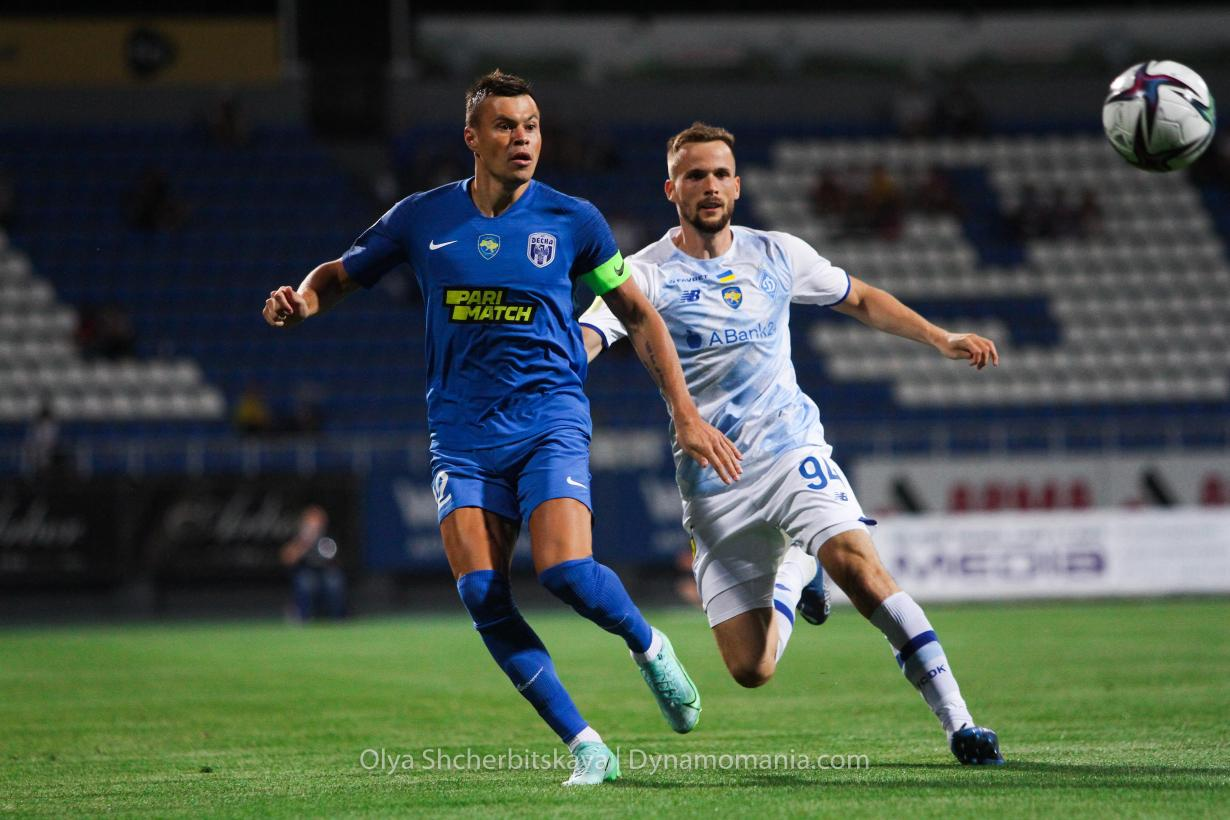
Yehor Kartushov, moved to the club in 2025

Following the promotion, a few players signed a new contract extension. FC Chernihiv signed young players such us Andriy Stolyarchuk and Nikita Dorosh on loan from FC Rukh Lviv. On 17 August 2025, thanks to three goals of Vyacheslav Koydan against Prykarpattia Ivano-Frankivsk, the club won the first match of the season.

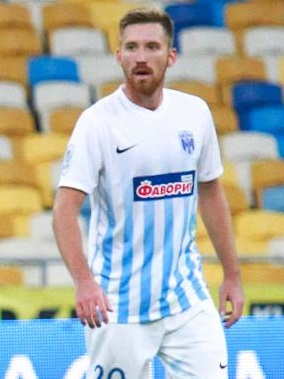
Denys Bezborodko, moved to the club in 2026

In September, 2025, the club awarded few players such as Artur Bybik, Anatoliy Romanchenko, and Maksym Serdyuk with special jerseys for reaching 100 official appearances for the club. In October 2025, FC Chernihiv qualified for the round of 16 of the Ukrainian Cup. On 28 October 2025, the club, after defeating FC Lisne, also reached the quarter-finals of the Ukrainian Cup for the first time in the club's history. On 7 March, FC Chernihiv announced the signing of Denys Bezborodko on a contract until December 2027. On 11 March 2026 the club signed Vladyslav Shapoval on loan from FC Kudrivka. On 18 March 2026, the club qualified for the semi-final of the Ukrainian Cup by beating Feniks-Mariupol on penalties.

The Guardian magazine dedicated an article to the miracle of the club, which until a few years ago played in the Ukrainian Amateur League. In the 2025–26, FC Chernihiv reached the 2026 Ukrainian Cup final, losing to Dynamo Kyiv 1–3. The club managed to stay in the Ukrainian First League for the second consecutive season.

=== End of Valeriy Chornyi Era ===
On 14 June 2026, the coach Valeriy Chornyi, after five years, resigned as head coach due to family reasons. Vasyl Baranov was appointed as new coach signing one-year contract, but after four draws in the Ukrainian First League and one victory in the Ukrainian Cup, his contract was terminated by mutual agreement of the parties and replaced by Andriy Polyanytsya as interim

== Infrastructure ==
=== Stadium ===
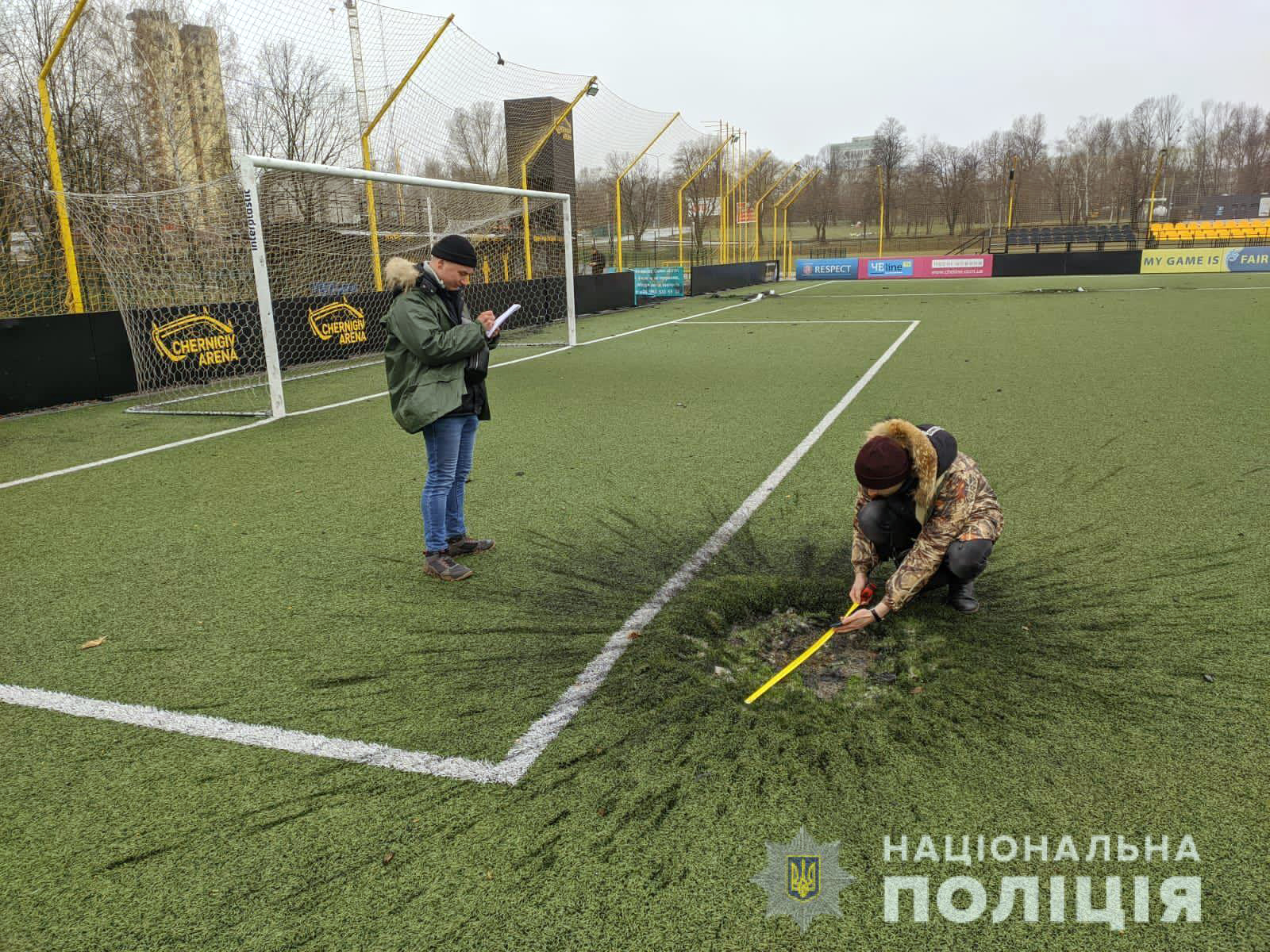
Chernihiv Arena after Russian shelling in March 2022

The club play at Chernihiv Arena. The stadium was built in 2017 with a capacity of 5,000 spectators.

=== Training centre ===
Since summer 2021 FC Chernihiv has trained at Khimik Sport Complex. The club in the past used the Lokomotyv stadium for training. The management of the club as well as fellow local Desna Chernihiv joined in a plan to build football fields and other sports infrastructure in the city.

=== Youth, academy and reserves ===
The club has few reserve teams, the main one is FC Chernihiv-2 founded in 2024. In 2021, the club planned to create a children's academy.

== Crest and colours ==
The crest of the club was created in early 2003, and it was changed in 2017. The club made its debut at national level in 2013. The colours of the club are yellow and black.

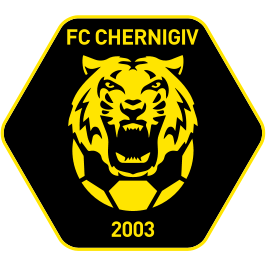
Club logo from 2017

== Players ==
=== Current squad ===
As of 24 July 2026

Note: Flags indicate national team as defined under FIFA eligibility rules; some limited exceptions apply. Players may hold more than one non-FIFA nationality.

No.	Pos.	Nation	Player
2	DF	UKR	Eduard Halstyan
3	DF	UKR	Maksym Shumylo
6	MF	UKR	Yehor Shalfyeyev
7	MF	UKR	Dmytro Myronenko (vice-captain)
8	MF	UKR	Artur Bybik
10	MF	UKR	Vyacheslav Koydan
11	FW	UKR	Andriy Novikov
12	MF	UKR	Yehor Kartushov
13	MF	UKR	Simon Haloian (on loan from Livyi Bereh Kyiv)
15	MF	UKR	Dzhilindo Bezghubchenko
20	DF	UKR	Dmytro Fatyeyev
21	FW	UKR	Denys Bezborodko
22	GK	UKR	Oleksandr Roshchynskyi
23	DF	UKR	Oleksiy Zenchenko (3rd captain)

No.	Pos.	Nation	Player
24	MF	UKR	Dmytro Didok
26	MF	UKR	Davronbek Azizov
33	MF	UKR	Andriy Porokhnya
35	GK	UKR	Maksym Tatarenko (captain)
38	DF	UKR	Pavlo Shushko
44	MF	UKR	Dmytro Plakhtyr
55	DF	UKR	Anatoliy Romanchenko
69	FW	UKR	Ilya Yevchenko
77	MF	UKR	Maksym Serdyuk
78	FW	UKR	Dmytro Kulyk
80	MF	UKR	Nikita Terrekhovets
87	MF	UKR	Valeriy Rohozynskyi (on loan from Kudrivka)
99	GK	UKR	Denys Herasymenko

=== Out on loan ===
Note: Flags indicate national team as defined under FIFA eligibility rules; some limited exceptions apply. Players may hold more than one non-FIFA nationality.

No. / Pos. / Nation / Player	No. / Pos. / Nation / Player

=== Other players under contract ===
Note: Flags indicate national team as defined under FIFA eligibility rules; some limited exceptions apply. Players may hold more than one non-FIFA nationality.

No. / Pos. / Nation / Player	No. / Pos. / Nation / Player

== Personnel ==
As of 25 August 2026

Position	Staff
President	(Ukraine) Yuriy Synytsya
General director	(Ukraine) Mykola Synytsya
Sports director	(Ukraine) Valeriy Chornyi
Executive director	(Ukraine) Kostyantyn Zhyr
Head coach	(Ukraine) Andriy Polyanytsya
Assistant coach	(Ukraine) Artem Padun
Goalkeeping coach	(Ukraine) Oleksandr Shyray
Physical training coach	(Ukraine) Andriy Lakeyenko
Chernihiv Arena Director	(Ukraine) Anatoliy Dudchik
Rehabilitation therapist	(Ukraine) Artem Berdychenko
PR manager	(Ukraine) Oleksandr Hrebennikov
Press attaché	(Ukraine) Dmytro Luschay
Sport Doctor	(Ukraine) Daria Rakhinskaya

== Honours ==
=== Domestic ===
- Ukrainian Cup
  - Runners-up (1): 2025–26
- Chernihiv Oblast Football Championship
  - Winners (1): 2019
- Chernihiv Oblast Football Cup
  - Winners (1): 2012
- Chernihiv Oblast Super Cup:
  - Winners (2): 2013, 2019

=== Individual player and coach awards ===
Best Goalkeeper of Ukrainian Second League

- (Ukraine) Maksym Tatarenkoː 2024–25 (13 clean sheets)

== Kit suppliers and shirt sponsors ==
Year	Kit manufacturer	Shirt sponsor
2020–2023	(Spain) Joma	(Germany) Jako
2023–2026	(Germany) Adidas	(Germany) Jako
2026–	(Germany) Adidas	(Ukraine) Beton

== Records and statistics ==
=== Matches played ===
#	Name	Career	Caps	Goals
1	(Ukraine) Dmytro Myronenko	2015, 2017–	189	20
2	(Ukraine) Anatoliy Romanchenko	2019–	145	17
3	(Ukraine) Kyrylo Kryvoborodenko	2015, 2017–2024	128	14
4	(Ukraine) Artur Bybik	2020–	128	0
5	(Ukraine) Maksym Serdyuk	2017–2024, 2024–	124	14
6	(Ukraine) Vyacheslav Koydan	2013, 2021, 2022–	123	25
7	(Ukraine) Oleksiy Zenchenko	2017–	115	6
8	(Georgia (country)) Teymuraz Mchedlishvili	2011–13, 2015, 2017–2021	108	15
9	(Ukraine) Maksym Shumylo	2021–	92	2
10	(Ukraine) Vitaliy Mentey	2020–2025	92	5

=== Goals scored ===
#	Name	Career	Caps	Goals
1	(Ukraine) Vyacheslav Koydan	2013, 2021, 2022–	123	25
2	(Ukraine) Dmytro Myronenko	2017–	189	20
3	(Ukraine) Anatoliy Romanchenko	2020–	145	17
4	(Georgia (country)) Teymuraz Mchedlishvili	2011–2013, 2015, 2017–2021	108	15
5	(Ukraine) Maksym Serdyuk	2017–2024, 2024–	124	14
6	(Ukraine) Kyrylo Kryvoborodenko	2015, 2017–2024	128	14
7	(Ukraine) Anatoly Kokhanovskyi	2017–2022	42	13
8	(Ukraine) Pavlo Fedosov	2013, 2023–2025	43	12
9	(Ukraine) Ruslan Dedukh	2017–2018, 2020–2021	34	12
10	(Ukraine) Oleksandr Kravchenko	2010–2021	46	12

== Managers and presidents ==
=== Presidents ===
President	Citizenship	Period	Ref.
Yuriy Synytsya	Ukraine	2003–present	

=== Managers ===
Coach	Citizenship	Period	Ref.
Vadym Postovoy	Ukraine	2006–2021	
Valeriy Chornyi (interim)	Ukraine	2021	
Valeriy Chornyi	Ukraine	2021–2026	
Vasyl Baranov	Ukraine	2026	
Andriy Polyanytsya (interim)	Ukraine	2026–	

== League and cup history ==
Season	Div.	Pos.	Pl.	W	D	L	GS	GA	P	Domestic Cup	Other		Notes
2013	4th Group 2 (Amateur Championship)	2/6	10	5	3	2	9	5	18	-	-	-	First stage
2013	4th Group A (Amateur Championship)	4/4	3	1	0	2	2	4	3	-	-	-	Finals
2013	4th Group A (Amateur Championship)	4/4	3	1	0	2	2	4	3	-	-	-	Withdrew
regional competitions (Chernihiv Oblast)
2017–18	4th Group 2 (Amateur Championship)	7/8	14	2	3	9	10	26	9	-	-	-	Withdrew
2018–19	regional competitions (Chernihiv Oblast)									-	UAC	1/32 finals	-
2019–20	4th Group 2 (Amateur Championship)	5/12	22	9	7	6	30	23	34	-	-	-	Admitted to SL
2020–21	3rd"A" (Second League)	10/14	24	5	6	13	19	33	21	1/64 finals	-	-	-
2021–22	3rd"A" (Second League)	10/14	18	5	5	8	17	24	20	1/32 finals	-	-	Admitted to FL
2022–23	2nd"B" (First League)	13/16	27	9	8	10	28	30	27	Not held	-	-	-
2023–24	2nd"B" (First League)	19/20	23	7	5	16	34	48	23	1/64 finals	-	-	Relegated
2024–25	3rd"B" (Second League)	2/20	18	11	5	2	30	8	38	1/32 finals	-	-	Promotion to Ukrainian First League via Promotion play-offs: Skala 1911 Stryi 3:2 1:0 (4-2), Relegation play-offs of 2024–25 Ukrainian First League:Metalurh Zaporizhzhia 3:0 2:0 (5-0)
2025–26	2nd (First League)	13/16	30	8	7	15	30	36	31	Runners-up	-	-	-
2026–27	2nd (First League)	9/16	10	2	4	4	11	14	10	1/8 finals	-	-	TBD

== Notable players ==
Players who have played in the club and who have distinguished themselves in some higher leagues above the Ukrainian Second League

- (Ukraine) Yehor Kartushov
- (Ukraine) Denys Bezborodko
- (Ukraine) Dmytro Fatyeyev
- (Ukraine) Vyacheslav Koydan
- (Ukraine) Pavlo Shushko
- (Ukraine) Myroslav Serdyuk
- (Ukraine) Ruslan Dedukh
- (Ukraine) Anatoliy Romanchenko
- (Ukraine) Yehor Shalfyeyev
- (Ukraine) Dmytro Myronenko
- (Ukraine) Kyrylo Kryvoborodenko
- (Ukraine) Maksym Serdyuk
- (Ukraine) Teymuraz Mchedlishvili

== See also ==
- List of sport teams in Chernihiv
- FC Desna Chernihiv
- FC Desna-2 Chernihiv
- FC Desna-3 Chernihiv
- SDYuShOR Desna
- Yunist Chernihiv
- Yunist ShVSM
- Lehenda Chernihiv
