= Chernihiv Arena =

Chernihiv, Ukraine sports stadium

Chernihiv-Arena
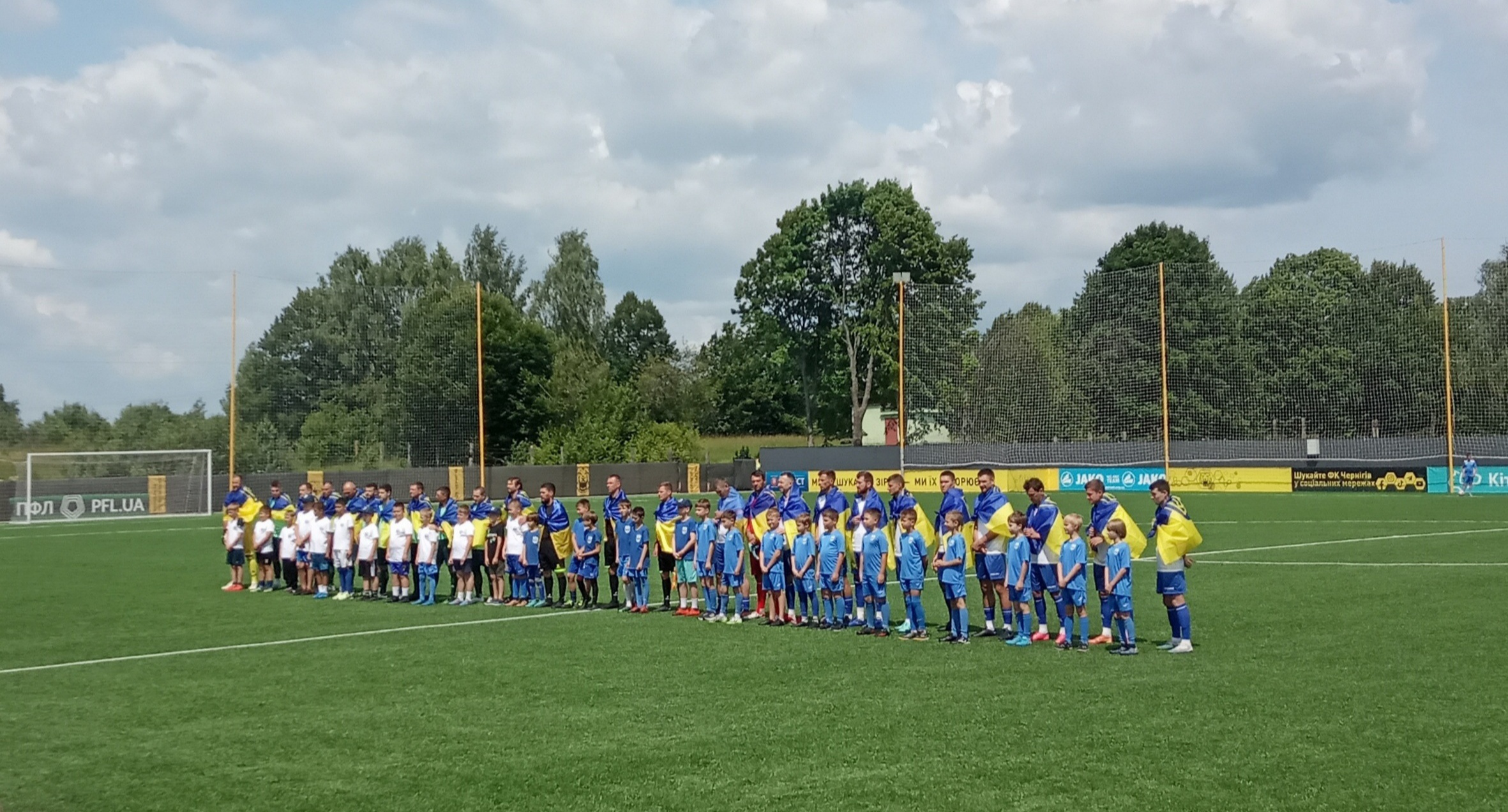
- Charity match on the occasion of Desna's 65th anniversary at the Chernihiv Arena
- Interactive map of Chernihiv-Arena
- Former names: Yuriy Synytsya
- Location: Kiltseva street 2а Chernihiv, Chernihiv Oblast, Ukraine 14039
- Coordinates: 51°32′33″N 31°15′55″E
- Owner: COLLAR Company
- Operator: FC Chernihiv
- Capacity: 500
- Surface: Artificial grass
- Field size: 105x68

Construction
- Opened: 2016
- Expanded: 22 May 2017

Tenants
- WFC Lehenda-ShVSM Chernihiv; Yunist Chernihiv; Spartak Chernihiv; Desna Chernihiv U14; Desna Chernihiv U19; Desna Chernihiv U21

The Chernihiv-Arena (Ukrainian: Чернігів-Арена) is a sports stadium mainly used by the club FC Chernihiv and sometimes by FC Desna 2. It is located in Chernihiv, Chernihiv Oblast, Ukraine.

== Description ==
The stadium consists of a football field with artificial turf, an office building with locker rooms and showers, a room for coaches, a club office, and parking. Infrastructure includes a rainwater collection system, solar panels and a heating system. There is a children's gym, a sports shop and a club museum. There are also two mini-football pitches and one multi-sport field.

== History ==
=== Origin ===
In 2012, the club's management made the first attempts to find land for the construction of the stadium. Businessman and owner of FC Chernihiv Yuri Sinitsa undertook to build a football field. After the established of FC Chernihiv in 2003, the club played at the stadium of Desna Chernihiv football field, but due to the ground's high rent and limited availability, Sinitsa sought to build a new stadium.

At the end of 2014, local authorities gave permission to develop a project for the area. In the summer of 2016, the first construction work started and after 11 months, in May 2017, the football field, the building with changing rooms and showers, all communications, roads, and parking lots were ready to receive visitors.

=== Accreditation by Ukrainian UAF ===
In the summer of 2020, Chernihiv Arena received accreditation from the UAF to host Ukrainian Second League matches. In the same year the main club of the city, Desna Chernihiv, rented the arena for their own U-21 and U-19 teams.

=== Damage ===
On 31 August 2021, the Chernihiv Arena hosted the first match of the 2021–22 Ukrainian Cup between FC Chernihiv and Alians Lypova Dolyna.

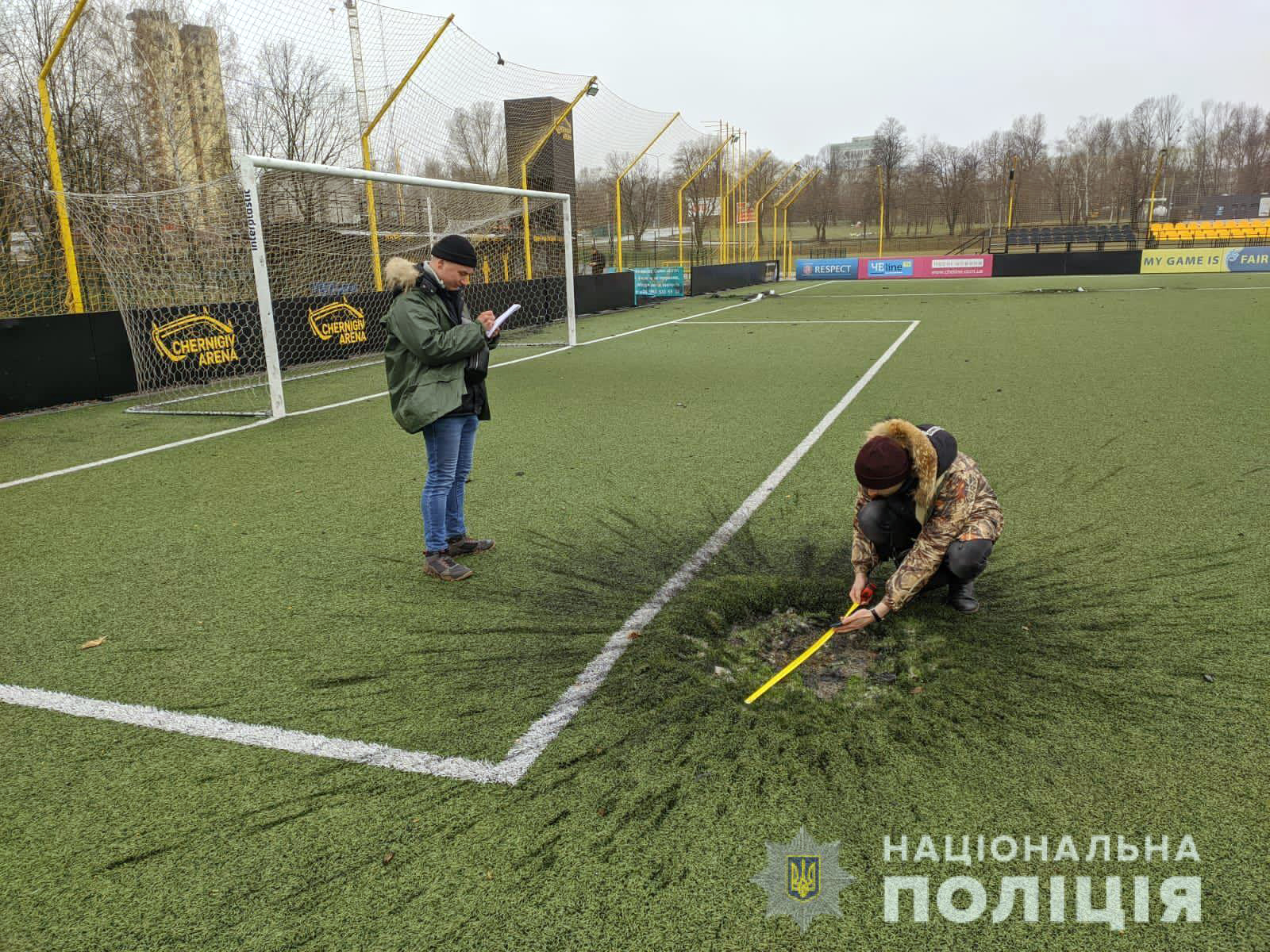
A scar from the shelling

The 2022 Russian invasion of Ukraine began on 24 February 2022. On 9 March, during the Siege of Chernihiv, the stadium was damaged, as well as part of the administrative building and locker rooms, the box office and the fan shop. In April 2022, the club's press office stated that specialists had carried out a deconstruction of the arena and cleaned up all the non-violent items that they had found. On 20 April 2022, the employees of FC Chernihiv began cleaning the grounds. On 24 April 2022, the first friendly football match since the beginning of hostilities was held. On 26 April 2022, the players of FC Chernihiv held their first training session at the home stadium since the beginning of the war. Before the lesson, the team and staff cleared debris from the pitch. The players who were in the city were joined in the two-sided game by head coach Valeriy Chornyi, goalkeeping coach Artem Padun, team administrator Dmytro Avramenko and Chernihiv Arena director Anatoliy Dudchyk. At the end of July 2022, the arena was repaired after further damage from shelling with rockets. In August 2022, FC Chernihiv made an appeal for donations to help repair the stadium fully.

=== Back in operation ===
On 19 April 2025, Chernihiv returns to play at the Arena during the match against Nyva Vinnytsia in Ukrainian Second League, where they had not played since 2021.

== Transport connections ==
There are many connection to the stadium from Krasna Square that stop just beside the stadium by the Myru Avenue

== Use ==
As well as being FC Chernihiv's home ground, the stadium is leased by FC Desna for its Desna U-21 and Desna U-19 games. It also hosts matches of the DUFLU championship of the Desna and Yunost sports school teams, the Chernihiv city championship, the Chernihiv region championship, the veterans' championship, and the annual USB Cup and Winter Spark tournaments.

Matches of the Ukrainian Women's League and First Leagues, and friendly matches of the Ukrainian Women's National Team are also held at the ground..

The arena has hosted some friendly matches of Desna Chernihiv, the main team of Chernihiv.

== Important matches ==
=== Ukrainian Cup (Quarter-finals) ===
The stadium was also used for some Ukrainian Women's Cup matches.

Date	Team #1	Result	Team #2	Round	Attendance	Source
18 March 2026	(Ukraine) Chernihiv	5–4	(Ukraine) Feniks-Mariupol	2025–26 Ukrainian Cup	300	

=== Ukrainian Women's Cup (Semifinals) ===
The stadium was also used for some Ukrainian Women's Cup matches.

Date	Team #1	Result	Team #2	Round	Attendance	Source
9 May 2018	(Ukraine) Lehenda Chernihiv	2–2	(Ukraine) Yatran Berestivets	2017–18 Ukrainian Women's Cup	200	

== Gallery ==
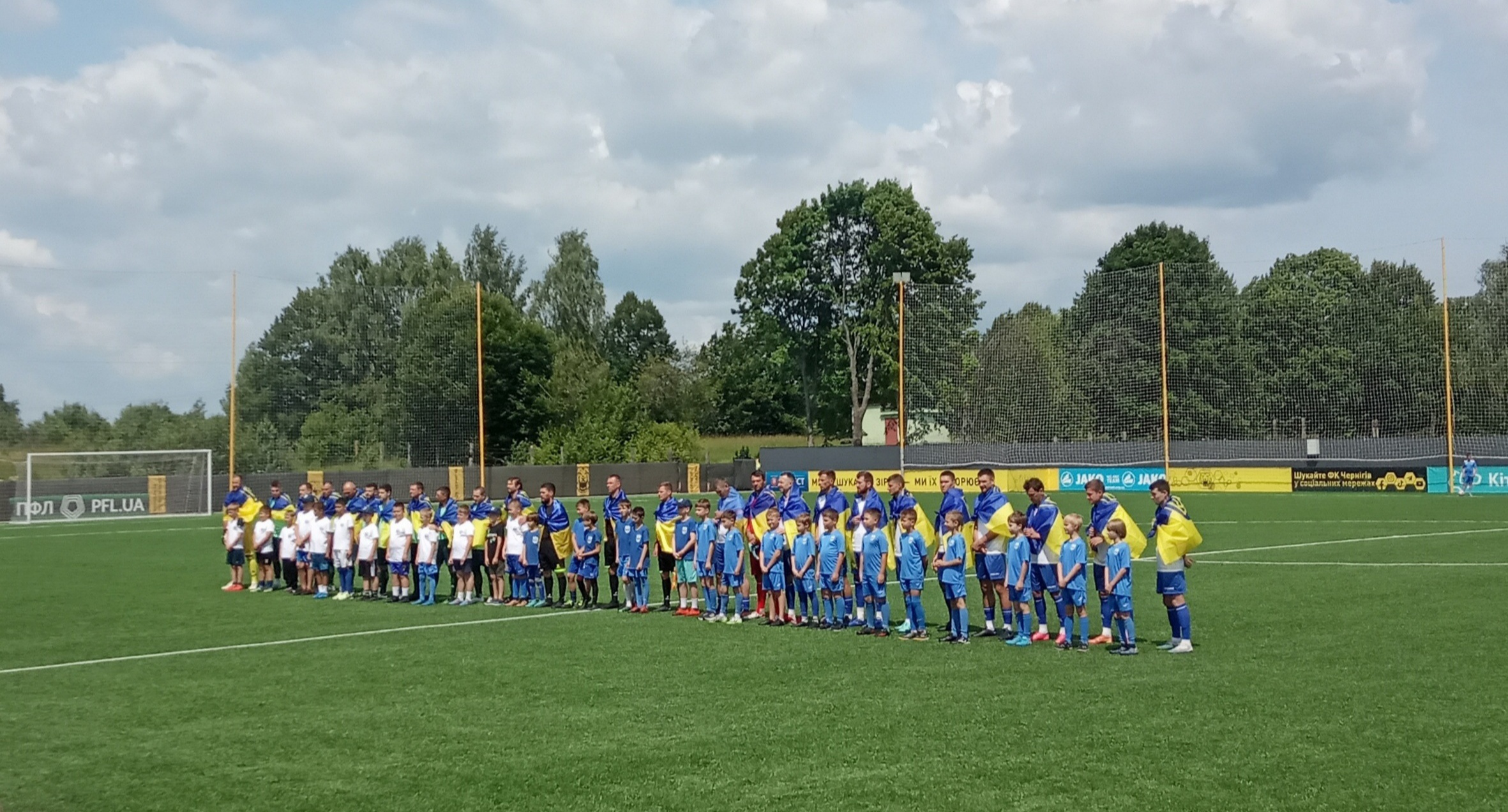
Charity match at the Chernihiv Arena

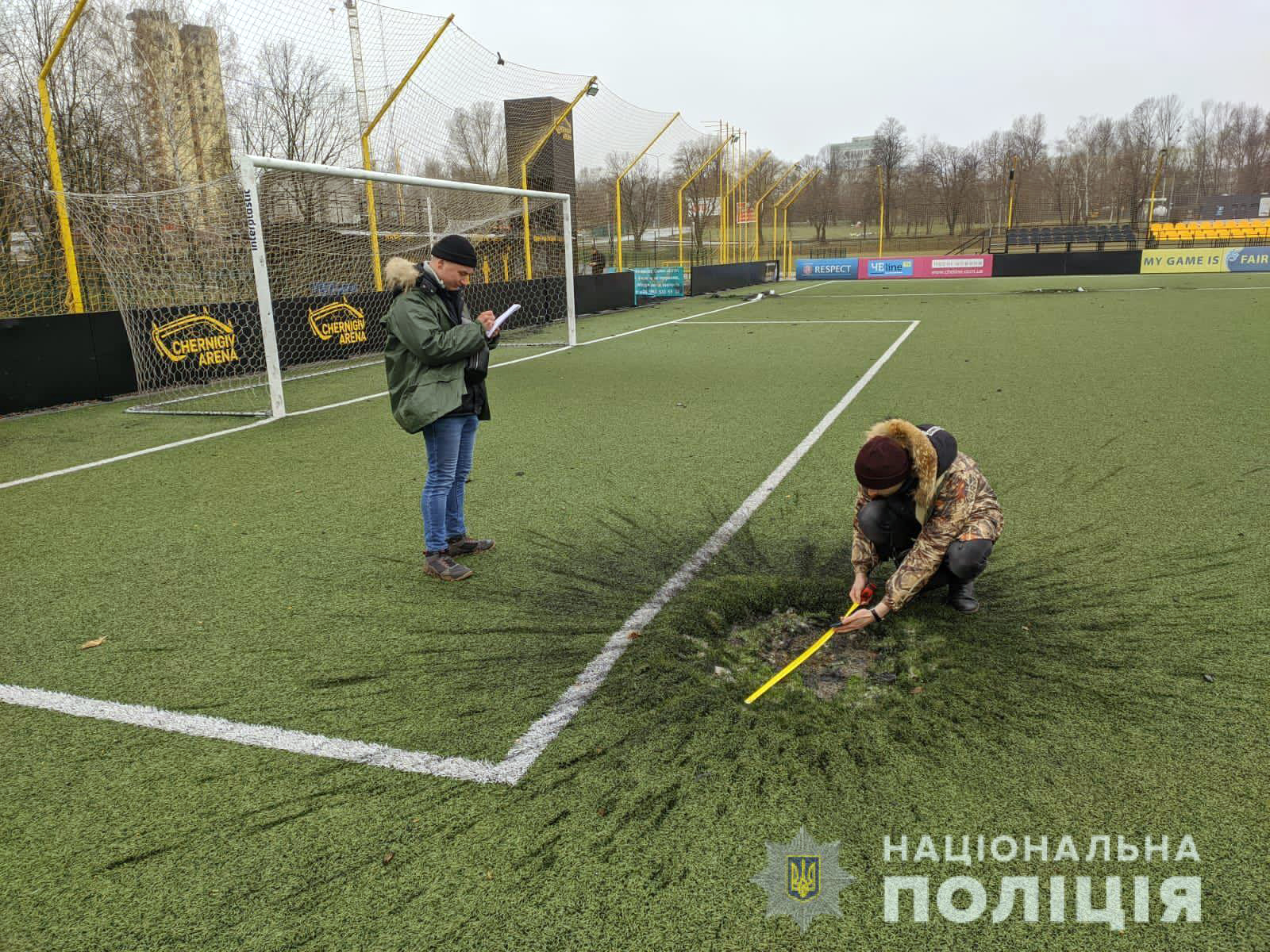
A scar from the shelling

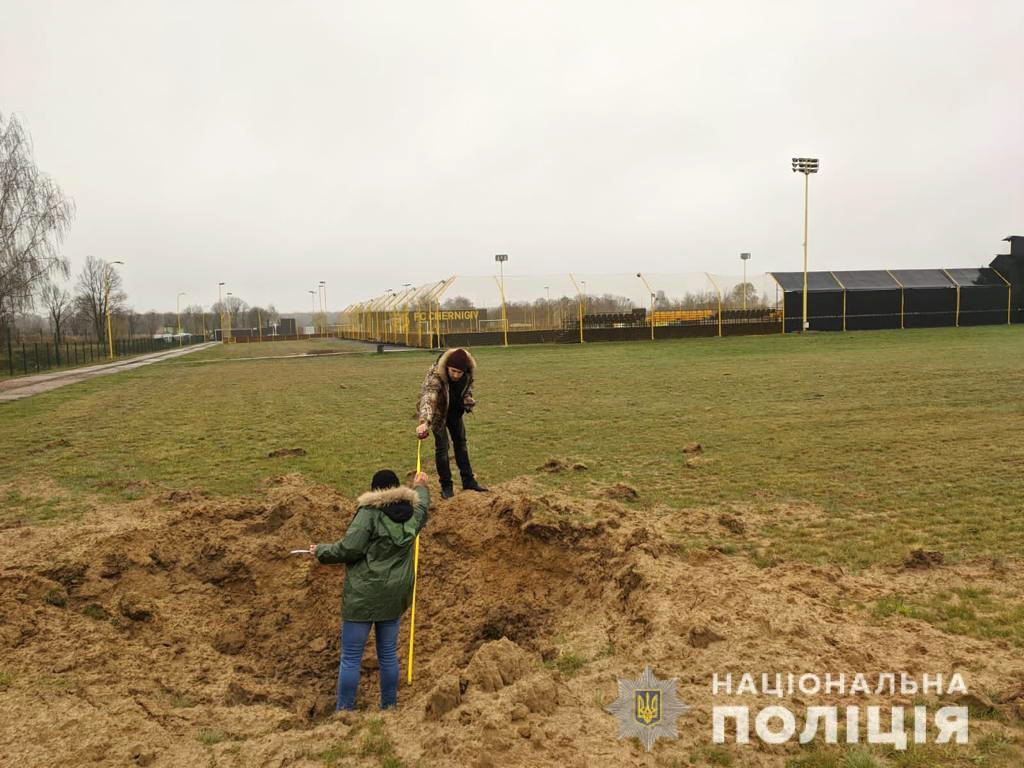
A scar from the shelling nearby the Arena

== See also ==
- List of sports venues in Chernihiv
