= 2017–18 in Ukrainian football =

Football in Ukraine
- Season: 2017–18

Men's football
- Premier League: Shakhtar Donetsk
- League 1: Arsenal-Kyiv
- League 2: Ahrobiznes Volochysk (Group A); SC Dnipro-1 (Group B)
- Amateur League: Viktoriya Mykolaivka
- Cup: Shakhtar Donetsk
- Amateur Cup: LNZ-Lebedyn
- FFU Regions' Cup: Lviv Oblast
- Super Cup: Shakhtar Donetsk

Women's football
- League High: Zhytlobud-1 Kharkiv
- League 1: Lviv-Yantorochka Novoyavorivsk (Group A); Voskhod Stara Mayachka (Group B); WFC Mariupol (Group C)
- Women's Cup: Zhytlobud-1 Kharkiv

The 2017–18 season was the 27th season of competitive association football in Ukraine since dissolution of the Soviet Union.

== Men's club football ==
League		Promoted to league	Relegated from league
Premier League		FC Mariupol; Veres Rivne	FC Dnipro (to League 2); Volyn Lutsk
League One		Zhemchuzhyna Odesa; Rukh Vynnyky; Kremin Kremenchuk; Balkany Zorya	Bukovyna Chernivtsi; Skala Stryi; FC Ternopil
League Two	Groups		
League Two	A	Ahrobiznes Volochysk; Polissya Zhytomyr; Nyva Ternopil; FC Lviv	~~Illichivets-2 Mariupol~~; ~~Krystal Kherson~~
League Two	B	Metalist 1925 Kharkiv; Tavriya Simferopol; SC Dnipro-1; MFC Mykolaiv-2	~~Illichivets-2 Mariupol~~; ~~Krystal Kherson~~

Note: For all scratched clubs, see section Clubs removed for more details

=== Premier League ===
Pos	Team	Pld	W	D	L	GF	GA	GD	Pts	Qualification or relegation
1	Shakhtar Donetsk	22	16	3	3	51	18	+33	51	Qualification for the Championship round
2	Dynamo Kyiv	22	13	6	3	42	20	+22	45	Qualification for the Championship round
3	Vorskla Poltava	22	11	4	7	28	22	+6	37	Qualification for the Championship round
4	Zorya Luhansk	22	8	9	5	38	28	+10	33	Qualification for the Championship round
5	Veres Rivne	22	7	11	4	26	17	+9	32	Qualification for the Championship round
6	FC Mariupol	22	9	5	8	30	27	+3	32	Qualification for the Championship round
7	Olimpik Donetsk	22	7	7	8	24	26	−2	28	Qualification for the Relegation round
8	FC Oleksandriya	22	4	11	7	19	23	−4	23	Qualification for the Relegation round
9	Zirka Kropyvnytskyi	22	4	7	11	13	31	−18	19	Qualification for the Relegation round
10	Karpaty Lviv	22	3	10	9	13	35	−22	19	Qualification for the Relegation round
11	Chornomorets Odesa	22	3	9	10	16	36	−20	18	Qualification for the Relegation round
12	Stal Kamianske	22	3	6	13	15	32	−17	15	Qualification for the Relegation round

Source: Ukrainian Premier League (in Ukrainian), UEFA, Soccerway
Rules for classification: 1) Points; 2) Goal difference; 3) Goals scored; 4) Head-to-head points; 5) Head-to-head goal difference; 6) Head-to-head goals scored; 7) Draw.

Pos	Team	Pld	W	D	L	GF	GA	GD	Pts	Qualification or relegation
1	Shakhtar Donetsk (C)	32	24	3	5	71	24	+47	75	Qualification for the Champions League group stage
2	Dynamo Kyiv	32	22	7	3	64	25	+39	73	Qualification for the Champions League third qualifying round
3	Vorskla Poltava	32	14	7	11	37	35	+2	49	Qualification for the Europa League group stage (Note: Since the winners of the 2017–18 Ukrainian Cup, Shakhtar Donetsk, qualified for European competition based on league position, the spot awarded to the cup winners (Europa League group stage) was passed to the third-placed team, the spot awarded to the third-placed team (Europa League third qualifying round) was passed to the fourth-placed team, and the spot awarded to the fourth-placed team (Europa League second qualifying round) was passed to the fifth-placed team.)
4	Zorya Luhansk	32	11	10	11	44	44	0	43	Qualification for the Europa League third qualifying round
5	FC Mariupol	32	10	9	13	38	41	−3	39	Qualification for the Europa League second qualifying round
6	Veres Rivne (D)	32	7	14	11	28	30	−2	35	Club suspended after the season

Source: Ukrainian Premier League (in Ukrainian), UEFA, Soccerway
Rules for classification: 1) Points; 2) Goal difference; 3) Goals scored; 4) Head-to-head points; 5) Head-to-head goal difference; 6) Head-to-head goals scored; 7) Draw.
(C) Champions; (D) Disqualified
Notes:

Pos	Team	Pld	W	D	L	GF	GA	GD	Pts	Qualification or relegation
7	FC Oleksandriya	32	10	15	7	32	27	+5	45	
8	Karpaty Lviv	32	8	13	11	28	45	−17	37	
9	Olimpik Donetsk	32	9	9	14	29	38	−9	36	
10	Zirka Kropyvnytskyi (R)	32	7	10	15	22	40	−18	31	Qualification for the Relegation play-offs
11	Chornomorets Odesa (Z)	32	6	11	15	26	49	−23	29	Qualification for the Relegation play-offs
12	Stal Kamianske (R, X)	32	6	8	18	23	44	−21	26	Relegated and later withdrawn

Source: Ukrainian Premier League (in Ukrainian), UEFA, Soccerway
Rules for classification: 1) Points; 2) Goal difference; 3) Goals scored; 4) Head-to-head points; 5) Head-to-head goal difference; 6) Head-to-head goals scored; 7) Draw.
(R) Relegated; (X) Withdrew; (Z) Readmitted in after withdrawal of FC Poltava. see 2017–18 Ukrainian Premier League #Relegation play-offs for more information.

Team 1	Agg.	Team 2	1st leg	2nd leg
Zirka Kropyvnytskyi	1–5	Desna Chernihiv	1–1	0–4
Chornomorets Odesa	1–3	FC Poltava	1–0	0–3 (a.e.t.)

=== League 1 ===
Pos	Team	Pld	W	D	L	GF	GA	GD	Pts	Promotion, qualification or relegation
1	Arsenal Kyiv (C, P)	34	23	6	5	59	23	+36	75	Promotion to Ukrainian Premier League
2	FC Poltava (O, X)	34	23	3	8	56	26	+30	72	Qualification to promotion play-offs
3	Desna Chernihiv (O, P)	34	22	5	7	71	25	+46	71	Qualification to promotion play-offs
4	Inhulets Petrove	34	21	6	7	46	20	+26	69	
5	Kolos Kovalivka	34	19	4	11	39	30	+9	61	
6	Avanhard Kramatorsk	34	15	7	12	44	42	+2	52	
7	Rukh Vynnyky	34	14	9	11	36	30	+6	51	
8	Hirnyk-Sport Horishni Plavni	34	16	2	16	30	40	−10	50	
9	Helios Kharkiv (Note: After the season completed, Helios Kharkiv was merged into FC Kobra Kharkiv. Kobra in its turn withdrew its professional squad from the league after playing only three games next season. And the president of actual Kobra admitted that he does not control the team that plays in the First League.)	34	14	4	16	35	43	−8	46	
10	MFC Mykolaiv	34	12	8	14	39	50	−11	44	
11	PFC Sumy	34	12	6	16	30	37	−7	42	
12	Balkany Zorya	34	9	13	12	30	35	−5	40	
13	Volyn Lutsk	34	11	3	20	31	44	−13	36	
14	Obolon-Brovar Kyiv	34	9	8	17	24	37	−13	35	
15	Naftovyk-Ukrnafta Okhtyrka (Note: After the season completed, Ukrnafta (related to the Privat Group) who sponsored Naftovyk-Ukrnafta Okhtyrka decided to liquidate the club since it was a tax liability.) (R, X)	34	8	9	17	27	42	−15	33	Withdrew after the season
16	Kremin Kremenchuk (R)	34	9	5	20	25	54	−29	32	Relegation to Ukrainian Second League
17	Cherkaskyi Dnipro (R)	34	8	4	22	27	50	−23	28	Relegation to Ukrainian Second League
18	Zhemchuzhyna Odesa (Note: Zhemchuzhyna Odesa withdrew after Round 31. Technical losses were adjudged against the team in the last three matches. At time of withdrawal, Zhemchuzhyna's had played 31 matches, with a record of 7 wins, 6 draws and 18 losses, scoring 33 goals and having conceded 54 goals.) (X)	34	7	6	21	33	54	−21	27	Withdrew after Round 31

Updated to match(es) played on 19 May 2018. Source: PFL.ua
Rules for classification: 1) Points; 2) Goal difference; 3) Goals scored; 4) Head-to-head points; 5) Head-to-head goal difference; 6) Head-to-head goals scored; 7) Fair play; 8) Draw or "golden match" (if tied for first).
(C) Champions; (O) Play-off winners; (P) Promoted; (R) Relegated; (X) Withdrew

=== League 2 ===
Pos	Team	Pld	W	D	L	GF	GA	GD	Pts	Promotion, qualification or relegation
1	Ahrobiznes Volochysk (Note: On 7 April 2018 Ahrobiznes Volochysk secured its promotion to the First League with 8 rounds before the end of season.) (C, P)	27	23	1	3	70	19	+51	70	Promotion to Ukrainian First League
2	Prykarpattia Ivano-Frankivsk (Note: On 21 April 2018 Prykarpattia Ivano-Frankivsk secured its promotion to the First League with 6 rounds before the end of season.) (P)	27	20	2	5	58	28	+30	62	Promotion to Ukrainian First League
3	Nyva-V Vinnytsia	27	13	6	8	34	21	+13	45	
4	Skala Stryi	27	12	4	11	29	29	0	40	Withdrew after the season
5	FC Lviv (Note: After completing the season, FC Lviv was promoted to the Ukrainian Premier League on pretence of merging with Veres Rivne and made a swap of their league membership. On 5 June 2018 the club was admitted to the 2018–19 Ukrainian Premier League while Veres Rivne would be in the 2018–19 Ukrainian Second League competition. In addition, the club's female team was admitted to the Ukrainian Women's League without participating in competitions of the first league which was required for promotion.) (P)	27	10	6	11	28	29	−1	36	Promotion to Ukrainian Premier League
6	Bukovyna Chernivtsi	27	9	7	11	32	40	−8	34	
7	Nyva Ternopil (Note: After completing most of the season (23 games), Nyva Ternopil on 8 May 2018 the club informed the PFL that they are withdrawing from the competition due to the league's refereeing. However, after the Club's Directors met with PFL president Makarov it was announced that they will return to the competition, subsequently only missing one match against Podillya with technical defeat "-:+".)	27	9	6	12	25	29	−4	33	
8	Polissya Zhytomyr	27	9	3	15	31	44	−13	30	
9	Podillya Khmelnytskyi	27	6	4	17	20	44	−24	22	
10	Arsenal-Kyivshchyna Bila Tserkva (Note: Arsenal-Kyivshchyna Bila Tserkva – failed attestation for the next season and was removed from the league) (R)	27	4	1	22	18	62	−44	13	Withdrew after the season
-	FC Ternopil (Note: FC Ternopil after failing to arrive for their Round 6 away match against Polissya Zhytomyr, several days later informed the PFL that they are withdrawing from the competition. The club played four matches in the competition with a record of 4 losses scoring two goals and allowing nine goals scored against them. The PFL annulled their results as per league regulations and removed them from the official standings on the decision of the FFU Control and Disciplinary Committee of 7 September 2017.)	0	-	-	-	-	-	—	0	Results annulled

Updated to match(es) played on 2 June 2018. Source: PFL.ua
Rules for classification: 1) Points; 2) Goal difference; 3) Goals scored; 4) Head-to-head points; 5) Head-to-head goal difference; 6) Head-to-head goals scored; 7) Fair play; 8) Draw or play-off.
(C) Champions; (P) Promoted; (R) Relegated
Notes:

Pos	Team	Pld	W	D	L	GF	GA	GD	Pts	Promotion, qualification or relegation
1	SC Dnipro-1 (Note: On 2 May 2018 SC Dnipro-1 secured its promotion to the First League with 5 rounds before the end of season.) (C, P)	33	26	3	4	87	15	+72	81	Promotion to Ukrainian First League
2	Metalist 1925 Kharkiv (Note: On 26 May 2018 Metalist 1925 Kharkiv secured its promotion to the First League with one round before the end of season.) (P)	33	21	4	8	77	27	+50	67	Promotion to Ukrainian First League
3	Enerhiya Nova Kakhovka	33	19	4	10	67	32	+35	61	
4	Tavriya Simferopol	33	18	7	8	59	33	+26	61	
5	Myr Hornostayivka	33	14	11	8	47	30	+17	53	
6	Real Pharma Odesa	33	15	7	11	54	40	+14	52	
7	FC Nikopol	33	11	12	10	36	34	+2	45	
8	FC Dnipro (R)	33	16	7	10	57	34	+23	37 (Note: FC Dnipro were deducted 18 points. Initially 3 points were deducted for failing to comply with a decision of the FIFA's Disciplinary Committee of 29 August 2017 Later on 16 January 2018, the PFL implemented FIFA's Disciplinary Committee findings which were originally informed to the FFU on 16 August 2017 about its decision to deduct the club 6 points. On 6 March 2018, Dnipro was deducted additional 9 points including 3 for breaking its contract with Egídio Pereira Júnior and 6 for other debts. On 2 May 2018 the President of Professional Football League Serhiy Makarov stated that he does not exclude a possibility of further relegation of Dnipro due to unpaid old debts.)	Relegation to Ukrainian Football Amateur League (Note: After completing the season, FC Dnipro failed attestation for the 2018–19 Ukrainian Second League season and were approved by the FIFA Disciplinary Committee to be relegated to a lower classification level due to unpaid old debts. There are speculations that the club will be dissolved. FC Dnipro tried, but failed attestation for the season and were approved by the FIFA Disciplinary Committee to be relegated to a lower classification level due to unpaid old debts)
9	MFC Mykolaiv-2	33	10	7	16	41	58	−17	37	
10	Inhulets-2 Petrove (Note: After completing the season, the administration of Inhulets Petrove decided to dissolve its reserve club Inhulets-2 Petrove citing that the club would concentrate their funds on the main club and infrastructure.)	33	4	7	22	29	70	−41	19	Withdrew after the season
11	Sudnobudivnyk Mykolaiv (Note: Sudnobudivnyk Mykolaiv – failed attestation for the next season and was removed from the league) (R)	33	5	4	24	33	95	−62	19	Withdrew after the season
12	Metalurh Zaporizhzhia (Note: After completing the season, Metalurh Zaporizhzhia intended to stay in the league for the next season, but they failed attestation for the 2018–19 Ukrainian Second League season and the club's administration decided to dissolve the team. Prior to attestation, the club merged with FC Spartak-KPU Zaporizhzhia (a team of local university, KPU), but on 6 June 2018, the club failed attestation for the season and the club's administration decided to dissolve the team)	33	2	1	30	14	133	−119	7 (Note: On 2 June 2018 Metalurh Zaporizhzhia, after losing their last game of the season away against Tavriya 0–9, established a new league record for goals conceded with 133 goals.)	Withdrew after the season

Updated to match(es) played on 2 June 2018. Source: PFL.ua
Rules for classification: 1) Points; 2) Goal difference; 3) Goals scored; 4) Head-to-head points; 5) Head-to-head goal difference; 6) Head-to-head goals scored; 7) Fair play; 8) Draw or play-off.
(C) Champions; (P) Promoted; (R) Relegated

=== Cup competitions ===
==== Ukrainian Cup ====
9 May 2018
20:30

Shakhtar Donetsk	2–0	Dynamo Kyiv
Ferreyra 47'; Rakitskyi 61'	Report

Dnipro Arena, Dnipro
Attendance: 28,155
Referee: Yuriy Mozharovskyi, Lviv

==== Super Cup ====
15 July 2017
21:00 EEST

Shakhtar Donetsk	2 – 0	Dynamo Kyiv
Facundo Ferreyra 8', 56'	Report

Chornomorets Stadium, Odesa
Attendance: 34,146
Referee: Kostiantyn Trukhanov (Kharkiv)

== Women's club football ==
League	Promoted to league	Relegated from league
Higher League	Voskhod Stara Maiachka	~~Lehenda-ShVSM Chernihiv~~; Ateks SDIuShOR-16 Kyiv

Note: For all scratched clubs, see section Clubs removed for more details

=== Higher League ===
Pos	Team	Pld	W	D	L	GF	GA	GD	Pts	Qualification or relegation
1	Zhytlobud-1 Kharkiv (Note: Participant of the 2017–18 Ukrainian Women's Cup final.)	18	17	1	0	110	4	+106	52	Qualification to Champions League
2	Zhytlobud-2 Kharkiv	18	16	1	1	104	5	+99	49	
3	Lehenda-ShVSM Chernihiv	18	11	2	5	51	26	+25	35	Merged
4	Iatran Berestivets	18	10	4	4	31	20	+11	34	
5	Iednist Plysky	18	6	3	9	21	32	−11	21	
6	Pantery Uman	18	6	2	10	37	44	−7	20	
7	Zlahoda-Dnipro-1	18	5	4	9	15	55	−40	19	
8	Ladomyr Volodymyr-Volynskyi	18	5	3	10	28	49	−21	18	
9	Rodyna Kostopil	18	1	5	12	10	55	−45	8	
10	Ateks SDIuShOR-16 Kyiv	18	0	1	17	6	123	−117	−2	Relegation to Persha Liha

Source: womensfootball.com.ua
Rules for classification: 1) Points; 2) Head-to-head points; 3) Head-to-head goal difference; 4) Head-to-head goals scored; 5) Goal difference; 6) Goals scored.

== Clubs removed ==
=== Before the season ===
- Stal Kamianske, 12th place of the 2017–18 Ukrainian Premier League, was originally relegated, but later withdraw from the First League. The same day the PFL president confirmed that the league will consist of 16 teams. Originally, FC Stal Kamianske that were located in Kamianske played its games of the 2017–18 Ukrainian Premier League season in Kyiv. After relegation the club was admitted to the First League representing Bucha, Kyiv Oblast. Prior to the season commencing the club was renamed to FC Feniks Bucha.
- Naftovyk-Ukrnafta Okhtyrka, the Professional Football League allowed the club to keep its berth in the second tier even after its main sponsor announced that it will discontinue to fund the club. After the season completed, Ukrnafta (related to the Privat Group) who sponsored Naftovyk-Ukrnafta Okhtyrka decided to liquidate the club since it was a tax liability.
- Zhemchuzhyna Odesa withdrew after Round 31 during 2017–18 season. Technical losses were adjudged against the team in the last three matches. At time of withdrawal, Zhemchuzhyna's had played 31 matches, with a record of 7 wins, 6 draws and 18 losses, scoring 33 goals and having conceded 54 goals.
- Arsenal-Kyivshchyna Bila Tserkva failed attestation for the season and was removed from the league
- FC Ternopil after failing to arrive for their Round 6 away match against Polissya Zhytomyr, several days later informed the PFL that they are withdrawing from the competition. The club played four matches in the competition with a record of 4 losses scoring two goals and allowing nine goals scored against them. The PFL annulled their results as per league regulations and removed them from the official standings on the decision of the FFU Control and Disciplinary Committee of 7 September 2017.
- FC Metalurh Zaporizhzhia – prior to attestation, the club merged with FC Spartak-KPU Zaporizhzhia (a team of local university, KPU), but on 6 June 2018, the club failed attestation for the season and the club's administration decided to dissolve the team
- Inhulets-2 Petrove – the main club's administration of Inhulets Petrove decided to dissolve the second team
- Sudnobudivnyk Mykolaiv – failed attestation
- Skala Stryi – passed attestation, but dissolved its senior team protesting the FFU accusations in gambling. On 14 June 2018, there appeared information that the club will merge its academy with FC Volyn Lutsk.

=== During or after the season ===
- Arsenal–Kyiv withdrew from professional competitions after being relegated from the Premier League.
- PFC Sumy received new ownership during winter break in the face of Serhiy Vashchenko who earlier this season was supposed to become the owner of Kobra Kharkiv. The new head coach of the Sumy club who had been announced was also former head coach of Kobra, Oleksandr Oliynyk. At the same time according to the former club's director Anatoliy Boiko, on 1 December 2018 PFC Sumy did not have any players on contract. On 11 April 2019, the FFU Control and Disciplinary Committee adopted its decision to strip the club of professional status and exclude the club from any competitions that it is participating currently or in the future. However the club has a right to file an appeal. Additional separate sanctions were to be also applied against the club's playing and administrative personnel. On 14 April 2019, the chairman of the FFU committee of ethics and fair play Francesco Baranka noted in regards to additional sanctions that PFC Sumy has earned some 10 million euros in match fixing. More to it, Ukrainian coach Oleksandr Sevidov who held post of head coach consultant in PFC Sumy and previously managed FC Illichivets Mariupol received a lifetime disqualification.
- On 17 February 2019, president of FC Zirka Kropyvnytskyi commented on his club's withdrawal from further participation in competitions of the Ukrainian First League. The president accused the newly formed NABU and law enforcement authorities in pressure against him. The president of the league expressed his surprise claiming that there seemed no real reason why the club had to withdraw. On 5 April 2019, the PFL council of leagues adopted its decision to remove FC Zirka Kropyvnytskyi from the League as it officially withdrew on 14 March 2019. On 22 April 2019, the club's vice-president announced that the club will restart from regional competitions with intention to return the club's pro-status in the future.
- Helios Kharkiv, the club reorganized under new management under a new name as FC Kobra Kharkiv. The club merged with another amateur club called the Kobra Football Academy which was playing in the Kharkiv Oblast Football Championship. On 15 August 2018 the club informed the Professional Football League of Ukraine about withdrawal from professional competitions, and were later officially expelled from the league.
- FC Myr Hornostayivka withdrew from competitions in protest.
- Zlahoda-Dnipro-1 (dissolved)
- WFC Lviv (dissolved)
