= 2026–27 FC Chernihiv season =

Chernihiv
2026–27 season
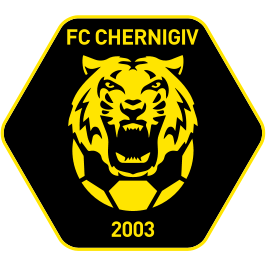
- Owner: Yuriy Synytsya
- Director: Mykola Synytsya
- Manager: Vasyl Baranov (until 24 August 2026); Andriy Polyanytsya (interim, from 24 August 2026, until now)
- Stadium: Chernihiv Arena
- First League: 14th
- Ukrainian Cup: Round of 16 (1/8)
- Top goalscorer: League: Maksym Serdyuk (2); Andriy Novikov (2); All: Andriy Novikov (3)
- Highest home attendance: 723 (vs Oleksandriya, 29 August 2026)
- Lowest home attendance: 430 (vs Polissya-2 Zhytomyr, 15 August 2026)
- Biggest win: Chernihiv 1-0 Nyva Ternopil; Prykarpattia-Blaho 0-1 Chernihiv
- Biggest defeat: Kulykiv-Bilka 5-0 Chernihiv
| Home colours | Away colours | Third colours |

During the 2026–27 season, FC Chernihiv competed in the Ukrainian First League.

== Season summary ==
On 14 June 2026, Valeriy Chornyi resigned as head coach and appointed as Sport Director. On 15 June 2025, Vasyl Baranov was appointed as new coach signing one-year contract. On 24 June 2026, the club extended the contracts of Andriy Novikov for three years. On 26 June, 2026, Vladyslav Shapoval and Vladyslav Chaban returned from loan to their respective clubs Kudrivka and Inhulets Petrove. The contracts of Dzhilindo Bezghubchenko, Mykyta Teplyakov and Andriy Stolyarchuk expired and were not renewed and they left the club. On July 2, 2026, Maksym Tatarenko and Anatoliy Romanchenko extended their contracts until 2029 and 2028, respectively. The club signs midfielder Valeriy Rohozynskyi on loan from Kudrivka until the end of 2026. On July 4, 2026, Davronbek Azizov and Dmytro Plakhtyr from Podillya and Poltava respectively signed a contract with the club. On 17 July 2026, Simon Haloian signed a contract with FC Chernihiv from Livyi Bereh Kyiv until the end of the year. On 24 June, 2026, after a tryout with Obolon Kyiv, Dzhilindo Bezghubchenko returned to FC Chernihiv, signing a two-year contract. On 24 August 2026, after four draws in the Ukrainian First League and a victory in the Ukrainian Cup, Vasyl Baranov and the club mutually terminated his contract and was replaced by Andriy Polyanytsya as interim coach in his place. His staff includes Andriy Lakeyenko (fitness coach), Artem Padun (goalkeeping coach) and Oleksandr Shyray (assistant goalkeeping coach). In September 2026, some players of the club were Honoured Master of Sport of Ukraine title for the team’s performance in the 2025–26 Ukrainian Cup season.

== Players ==
=== Squad information ===
As of 24 July 2026

| Squad no. | Name | Nationality | Position | Date of birth (age) |
Goalkeepers
| 22 | Oleksandr Roshchynskyi | (Ukraine) | GK | 30 November 2000 (aged 25) |
| 35 | Maksym Tatarenko (Captain) | (Ukraine) | GK | 7 May 1999 (aged 27) |
| 99 | Denys Herasymenko | (Ukraine) | GK | 7 October 2005 (aged 20) |
Defenders
| 2 | Eduard Halstyan | (Armenia) (Ukraine) | DF | 1 October 1998 (aged 27) |
| 3 | Maksym Shumylo | (Ukraine) | DF | 31 August 2002 (aged 23) |
| 20 | Dmytro Fatyeyev | (Ukraine) | DF | 21 June 1994 (aged 32) |
| 23 | Oleksiy Zenchenko (3rd captain) | (Ukraine) | DF | 17 October 1996 (aged 29) |
| 38 | Pavlo Shushko | (Ukraine) | DF | 7 May 2000 (aged 26) |
| 50 | Oleksandr Moroz | (Ukraine) | DF | 18 March 2009 (aged 17) |
Midfielders
| 6 | Yehor Shalfeyev | (Ukraine) | MF | 3 October 1998 (aged 27) |
| 7 | Dmytro Myronenko (vice-captain) | (Ukraine) | MF | 7 March 1996 (aged 30) |
| 8 | Artur Bybik | (Ukraine) | MF | 26 July 2001 (aged 24) |
| 10 | Vyacheslav Koydan | (Ukraine) | MF | 5 July 1994 (aged 32) |
| 12 | Yehor Kartushov | (Ukraine) | MF | 5 January 1991 (aged 35) |
| 13 | Simon Haloian (on loan from Livyi Bereh Kyiv) | (Russia) (Ukraine) | MF | 2 July 2002 (aged 24) |
| 15 | Dzhilindo Bezghubchenko | (Ukraine) | MF | 7 February 2003 (aged 23) |
| 24 | Dmytro Didok | (Ukraine) | DF | 24 January 2007 (aged 19) |
| 26 | Davronbek Azizov | (Tajikistan) (Ukraine) | MF | 13 July 2000 (aged 26) |
| 33 | Andriy Porokhnya | (Ukraine) | MF | 17 February 1997 (aged 29) |
| 44 | Dmytro Plakhtyr | (Ukraine) | MF | 14 February 1996 (aged 30) |
| 55 | Anatoliy Romanchenko | (Ukraine) | MF | 19 May 2001 (aged 25) |
| 77 | Maksym Serdyuk | (Ukraine) | MF | 21 May 2002 (aged 24) |
| 80 | Nikita Terrekhovets | (Ukraine) | MF | 9 December 2007 (aged 18) |
| 87 | Valeriy Rohozynskyi (on loan from Kudrivka) | (Ukraine) | MF | 3 September 1995 (aged 30) |
Forwards
| 9 | Dmytro Kulyk | (Ukraine) | FW | 26 January 2001 (aged 25) |
| 11 | Andriy Novikov | (Ukraine) | FW | 20 April 1999 (aged 27) |
| 21 | Denys Bezborodko | (Ukraine) | FW | 31 March 1994 (aged 32) |
| 51 | Artem Tytenko | (Ukraine) | FW | 12 February 2009 (aged 17) |
| 69 | Ilya Yevchenko | (Ukraine) | FW | 29 November 2009 (aged 16) |

== Management team ==
| Position | Name | Year appointed | Last club/team Vacant |
|---|---|---|---|
| Manager | (Ukraine) Andriy Polyanytsya | 2026– | SDYuShOR Desna Chernihiv |
| Manager | (Ukraine) Vasyl Baranov | 2026 | Kudrivka |
| Assistant Coach | (Ukraine) Artem Padun | 2026– | Chernihiv |
| Goalkeeping Coach | (Ukraine) Artem Padun | 2020– | SDYuShOR Desna Chernihiv |
| Assistant Goalkeeping Coach | (Ukraine) Oleksandr Shyray | 2026– | Chernihiv U19 |
| Athletic trainer | (Ukraine) Andriy Lakeyenko | 2026– | Chernihiv |
| Massagist | (Ukraine) Yegor Protsko | 2026– | Chernihiv |
| Assistant Coach | (Ukraine) Andriy Polyanytsya | 2022 | SDYuShOR Desna Chernihiv |
| Assistant Coach | (Ukraine) Serhiy Taran | 2026 | Kudrivka |
| Sport Director | (Ukraine) Valeriy Chornyi | 2021 | FC Chernihiv |

== Transfers ==
=== In ===
| Date | Pos. | Player | Age | Moving from | Type | Fee | Source |
Summer
| 2 July 2026 | MF | (Ukraine) Valeriy Rohozynskyi | 30 | (Ukraine) Kudrivka | Loan | Free | |
| 4 July 2026 | MF | (Ukraine) Davronbek Azizov | 26 | (Ukraine) Podillya | Transfer | Free | |
| 4 July 2026 | MF | (Ukraine) Dmytro Plakhtyr | 30 | (Ukraine) Poltava | Transfer | Free | |
| 17 July 2026 | MF | (Ukraine) Simon Haloian | 24 | (Ukraine) Livyi Bereh Kyiv | Loan | Free | |
| 23 July 2026 | MF | (Ukraine) Dzhilindo Bezghubchenko | 23 | Free Agent | Transfer | Free | |

=== Out ===
| Date | Pos. | Player | Age | Moving from | Type | Fee | Source |
Summer
| 26 June 2025 | DF | (Ukraine) Vladyslav Shapoval | 31 | (Ukraine) Kudrivka | Loan Return | Free | |
| 26 June 2025 | MF | (Ukraine) Vladyslav Chaban | 23 | (Ukraine) Inhulets Petrove | Loan Return | Free | |
| 26 June 2025 | MF | (Ukraine) Dzhilindo Bezghubchenko | 23 | Unattached | Transfer | Free | |
| 26 June 2025 | DF | (Ukraine) Mykyta Teplyakov | 25 | (Ukraine) FC Korosten | Transfer | Free | |
| 26 June 2025 | MF | (Ukraine) Andriy Stolyarchuk | 21 | Unattached | Transfer | Free | |
| 30 June 2025 | MF | (Ukraine) Nikita Dorosh | 19 | (Ukraine) Rukh Lviv | Loan Return | Free | |
| 24 July 2026 | FW | (Ukraine) Daniil Volskyi | 22 | (Ukraine) Kalynivka | Transfer | Free | |

== Pre-season and friendlies ==
Win Draw Loss

| 4 July 2025 Friendly | Chernihiv (Ukraine) | 0–0 | (Ukraine) Lokomotyv Kyiv | Chernihiv |
| EET (UTC+02:00) | | | | Stadium: Chernihiv Arena |

| 11 July 2025 Friendly | Polissya-2 Zhytomyr (Ukraine) | 3–1 | (Ukraine) Chernihiv | Zhytomyr |
| EET (UTC+02:00) | Makouana 7'; Mezentsev 40' | Report | Terrekhovets 86' | Stadium: Berezina, NTC Polissia |

| 15 July 2025 Friendly | Obolon Kyiv (Ukraine) | 3–2 | (Ukraine) Chernihiv | Bucha |
| EET (UTC+02:00) | Sukhanov 55' (pen.); Ustymenko 87'; New Player 104' | Report | Bezborodko 50'; Shalfeyev 70' (pen.) | Stadium: NTB Obolon |

| 18 July 2025 Friendly | Livyi Bereh Kyiv (Ukraine) | 2–1 | (Ukraine) Chernihiv | Kyiv |
| EET (UTC+02:00) | Andradina 80'; Shastal 81' | Report | Bezghubchenko 79' | Stadium: Arena Livyi Bereh |

== Competitions ==
=== Overall record ===
| Competition | First match | Last match | Starting round | Final position | Record | | | | | | | |
| Competition | First match | Last match | Starting round | Final position | Pld | W | D | L | GF | GA | GD | Win % |
|---|---|---|---|---|---|---|---|---|---|---|---|---|
| First League | 25 July 2026 | 2027 | Matchday 1 | | 13 | 2 | 4 | 7 | 13 | 24 | −11 | 15.38 |
| Ukrainian Cup | 23 August 2026 | | Round of 32 | Round of 8 | 3 | 2 | 0 | 1 | 7 | 5 | +2 | 66.67 |
| Total | | | | | 16 | 4 | 4 | 8 | 20 | 29 | −9 | 25.00 |

Last updated: 16 November 2026
Source: Results

=== First League ===
==== League table ====
| Pos | Team | Pld | W | D | L | GF | GA | GD | Pts | Promotion, qualification or relegation |
|---|---|---|---|---|---|---|---|---|---|---|
| 1 | Feniks-Mariupol | 17 | 9 | 5 | 3 | 25 | 15 | +10 | 32 | Promotion to Ukrainian Premier League |
| 2 | Viktoriya Sumy | 17 | 9 | 5 | 3 | 22 | 13 | +9 | 32 | Promotion to Ukrainian Premier League |
| 3 | Oleksandriya | 17 | 8 | 7 | 2 | 21 | 11 | +10 | 31 | Qualification to promotion play-offs |
| 4 | Ahrobiznes Volochysk | 16 | 9 | 3 | 4 | 26 | 17 | +9 | 30 | Qualification to promotion play-offs |
| 5 | Kulykiv-Bilka | 16 | 8 | 4 | 4 | 34 | 18 | +16 | 28 | |
| 6 | Poltava | 17 | 8 | 3 | 6 | 27 | 18 | +9 | 27 | |
| 7 | Metalist Kharkiv | 16 | 7 | 3 | 6 | 22 | 18 | +4 | 24 | Qualified for the Quarter-finals UC |
| 8 | Nyva Ternopil | 17 | 5 | 8 | 4 | 21 | 16 | +5 | 23 | |
| 9 | Lokomotyv Kyiv | 16 | 6 | 5 | 5 | 22 | 21 | +1 | 23 | |
| 10 | Inhulets Petrove | 16 | 5 | 4 | 7 | 16 | 22 | −6 | 19 | |
| 11 | Prykarpattia-Blaho | 17 | 4 | 6 | 7 | 15 | 21 | −6 | 18 | |
| 12 | UCSA Tarasivka | 17 | 3 | 7 | 7 | 22 | 28 | −6 | 16 | |
| 13 | Kolos-2 Kovalivka | 16 | 4 | 3 | 9 | 14 | 28 | −14 | 15 | Qualification to relegation play-off |
| 14 | Polissya-2 Zhytomyr | 17 | 2 | 7 | 8 | 25 | 34 | −9 | 13 | Qualification to relegation play-off |
| 15 | Probiy Horodenka | 17 | 2 | 6 | 9 | 16 | 37 | −21 | 12 | Relegation to Ukrainian Second League |
| 16 | Chernihiv | 13 | 2 | 4 | 7 | 13 | 24 | −11 | 10 | Relegation to Ukrainian Second League |

Updated to match(es) played on 21 November 2026. Source:
Rules for classification: 1) Points; 2) Head-to-head points; 3) Head-to-head goal difference; 4) Head-to-head goals scored; 5) Goal difference in all games; 6) Goals scored in all games (Note: calculation by criteria indicated in rules 2, 3, 4 is conducted with consideration of all teams that have an equal number of tournament points at the moment of calculation and not only among those which after preliminary criteria have appeared more successful).

The relegation–promotion play-off games were expected to be scheduled to take place between the 13th and 14th-placed teams with the third and fourth-placed teams of the Second League.

==== Results summary ====
| Overall | | | | | | | | Home | | | | | | Away | | | | | |
| Pld | W | D | L | GF | GA | GD | Pts | W | D | L | GF | GA | GD | W | D | L | GF | GA | GD |
|---|---|---|---|---|---|---|---|---|---|---|---|---|---|---|---|---|---|---|---|
| 13 | 2 | 4 | 7 | 13 | 24 | −11 | 10 | 1 | 2 | 0 | 4 | 3 | +1 | 1 | 2 | 7 | 9 | 21 | −12 |

Last updated: 21 November 2026.
Source: Results

==== Results by round ====
| Round | 1 | 2 | 3 | 4 | 5 | 6 | 7 | 8 | 9 | 10 | 11 | 12 | 13 | 14 | 15 | 16 | 17 | 18 |
|---|---|---|---|---|---|---|---|---|---|---|---|---|---|---|---|---|---|---|
| Ground | A | H | A | H | A | H | A | H | A | A | A | A | H | A | H | H | H | A |
| Result | D | D | D | D | L | W | L | | L | L | W | L | | L | | | | L |
| Position | 3 | 9 | 9 | 10 | 12 | 9 | 11 | | 14 | 14 | 14 | 14 | | 14 | | | | 16 |

Updated to match(es) played on 21 November 2026. Source: Results
A = Away; H = Home; W = Win; D = Draw; L = Loss

==== Results ====
| 25 July 2026 1 | Lokomotyv Kyiv | 1–1 | FC Chernihiv | Kyiv |
| 15:30 EEST (UTC+03:00) | Mordas 64'; Titarenko (yellow card) 72'; Sakhnenko (yellow card) 79' | Report | Fatyeyev 90+5' | Stadium: Bannikov Stadium; Attendance: 150 |

| 1 August 2026 2 | FC Chernihiv | 1–1 | Kulykiv-Bilka | Chernihiv |
| 15:30 EEST (UTC+03:00) | Bezghubchenko 10'; Plakhtyr (yellow card) 81'; Bezborodko (yellow card) 86' | Report | Haladey (yellow card) 29'; Popovskyi (yellow card) 51'; Malskyi 74' | Stadium: Chernihiv Arena; Attendance: 450 |

| 8 August 2026 3 | Probiy Horodenka | 1–1 | FC Chernihiv | Horodenka |
| 15:30 EEST (UTC+03:00) | Huk (yellow card) 39'; Fesenko 57'; Savitskyi (yellow card) 63'; Savchyn (yellow card) 71' | Report | Plakhtyr (yellow card) (yellow card) (yellow-red card); Shalfeyev (yellow card) 61'; Romanchenko (yellow card) 64'; Koydan 74'; Shushko (yellow card) 80'; Tatarenko (yellow card) 90+3' | Stadium: Probiy Arena; Attendance: 500 |

| 15 August 2026 4 | FC Chernihiv | 2–2 | Polissya-2 Zhytomyr | Chernihiv |
| 15:30 EEST (UTC+03:00) | Romanchenko 5' (pen.); Bezborodko (yellow card) 12'; Rohozynskyi (yellow card) 55'; Zenchenko (yellow card) 58'; Serdyuk (yellow card) 63'; Halstyan 76'; Shushko (yellow card) 90+1' | Report | Ivanov 53'; Panchyshyn (yellow card) 50'; Panchyshyn (penalty missed); Avramenko 83' | Stadium: Chernihiv Arena; Referee: 430 |

| 29 August 2026 5 | Oleksandriya | 1–0 | FC Chernihiv | Oleksandriia |
| 15:30 EEST (UTC+03:00) | Yade 73' | Report | Plakhtyr (yellow card) 62'; Fatyeyev (yellow card) 72' | Stadium: CSC Nika; Referee: 723 |

| 4 September 2026 6 | FC Chernihiv | 1–0 | Nyva Ternopil | Chernihiv |
| 15:30 EEST (UTC+03:00) | Serdyuk 23'; Serdyuk (yellow card) 65'; Bezborodko (yellow card) 90+3' | Report | Habelok (yellow card) 31'; Mysyk (yellow card) 33'; Snurnitsyn (yellow card) 60'; Paruta (yellow card) 81' | Stadium: Chernihiv Arena; Attendance: 350 |

| 13 September 2026 7 | UCSA Tarasivka | 3–2 | FC Chernihiv | Bucha |
| 15:30 EEST (UTC+03:00) | Zakhidnyi (yellow card) 3'; Andrushchenko (yellow card) 13'; Khoblenko (yellow card) 14'; Dvorovenko (yellow card) 20'; Voytsekhovskyi 51'; Yuvkhymets 90+3' | Report | Plakhtyr (yellow card) 18'; Haloian (yellow card) 42'; Novikov 58'; Novikov (yellow card) 59'; Kartushov 68' | Stadium: Stadion Yuvileinyi |

| 19 September 2026 8 | FC Chernihiv | Postponed | Inhulets Petrove | Chernihiv |
| 15:30 EEST (UTC+03:00) | | | | Stadium: Chernihiv Arena |

| 26 September 2026 9 | Metalist Kharkiv | 2–0 | FC Chernihiv | Uzhorod |
| 15:30 EEST (UTC+03:00) | Prykhodko (yellow card) 29'; Halstyan 76' (org); Prykhodko 90+1' | Report | Haloian (yellow card) 40'; Zenchenko (yellow card) 68' | Stadium: Avanhard; Attendance: 100 |

| 2 October 2026 10 | Poltava | 3–2 | FC Chernihiv | Poltava |
| 15:30 EEST (UTC+03:00) | Kononov 21'; Kasimov 68'; Seytkhalilov 72'; Seytkhalilov (yellow card) 83'; Buzhyn (yellow card) 90'; Sad (yellow card) 90' | Report | Haloian 2'; Serdyuk 53'; Romanchenko (yellow card) 74'; Bybik (yellow card) 83'; Kartushov (yellow card) 90' | Stadium: Vorskla Stadium; Attendance: 305 |

| 10 October 2026 11 | Prykarpattia-Blaho | 0–1 | FC Chernihiv | Ivano-Frankivsk |
| 15:30 EEST (UTC+03:00) | Tsyutsyura (yellow card) 65'; Mykhalchuk (yellow card) 79' | Report | Plakhtyr 64' | Stadium: MCS Rukh; Attendance: 500 |

| 17 October 2026 12 | Viktoriya Sumy | 2–1 | FC Chernihiv | Trostianets |
| 15:30 EEST (UTC+03:00) | Kharchenko 16'; Lyehostayev (yellow card) 34'; Ulyanov (yellow card) 52'; Khamelyuk 66' (pen.); Hryshchenko (yellow card) 74' | Report | Novikov 19'; Tatarenko (red card) 21; Plakhtyr (yellow card) 48'; Azizov (yellow card) 84' | Stadium: Kuts Stadium; Attendance: 50 |

| 23 October 2026 13 | FC Chernihiv | Postponed | Ahrobiznes Volochysk | Chernihiv |
| 15:30 EEST (UTC+03:00) | | | | Stadium: Chernihiv Arena |

| 31 October 2026 14 | Feniks-Mariupol | 3–1 | FC Chernihiv | Lviv |
| 15:30 EEST (UTC+03:00) | Hunichev 12'; Orikhovskyi 64' (pen.); Orikhovskyi 81' | Report | Shalfeyev 32'; Myronenko (yellow card) 36'; Bybik (yellow card) 75' | Stadium: Skif Stadium; Attendance: 120 |

| 7 November 2026 15 | FC Chernihiv | Postponed | Kolos-2 Kovalivka | Chernihiv |
| 15:30 EEST (UTC+03:00) | | | | Stadium: Chernihiv Arena |

| 11 November 2026 8 | FC Chernihiv | Postponed | Inhulets Petrove | Chernihiv |
| 15:30 EEST (UTC+03:00) | | | | Stadium: Chernihiv Arena |

| 16 November 2026 16 | FC Chernihiv | Postponed | Lokomotyv Kyiv | Chernihiv |
| 15:30 EEST (UTC+03:00) | | | | Stadium: Chernihiv Arena |

| 21 November 2026 17 | Kulykiv-Bilka | 5–0 | FC Chernihiv | Kulykiv |
| 15:30 EEST (UTC+03:00) | Patulyak 5'; Semotyuk (yellow card) 21'; Haladey 51'; Patulyak 58'; Kopyl 60'; Semotyuk 88' | Report | Porokhnya (yellow card) 7'; Halstyan (yellow card) 53'; Kartushov (yellow card) 59'; Kartushov (yellow card) 59' | Stadium: Arena Kulykiv; Attendance: 200 |

| 24 November 2026 13 | Ahrobiznes Volochysk | x–x | FC Chernihiv | Volochysk |
| 15:30 EEST (UTC+03:00) | | | | Stadium: Yunist Stadium |

| 28 November 2026 18 | FC Chernihiv | x–x | Probiy Horodenka | Chernihiv |
| 15:30 EEST (UTC+03:00) | | | | Stadium: Chernihiv Arena |

| 20 March 2027 19 | Polissya-2 Zhytomyr | x–x | FC Chernihiv | Hlybochytsia |
| 15:30 EEST (UTC+03:00) | | | | Stadium: Polissya Training Center |

| 27 March 2027 20 | FC Chernihiv | x–x | Oleksandriya | Chernihiv |
| 15:30 EEST (UTC+03:00) | | | | Stadium: Chernihiv Arena |

| 3 April 2027 21 | Nyva Ternopil | x–x | FC Chernihiv | Poltava |
| 15:30 EEST (UTC+03:00) | | | | Stadium: Vorskla imeni Butovskoho |

| 10 April 2027 22 | FC Chernihiv | x–x | UCSA Tarasivka | Chernihiv |
| 15:30 EEST (UTC+03:00) | | | | Stadium: Chernihiv Arena |

| 17 April 2027 23 | Inhulets Petrove | x–x | FC Chernihiv | Petrove |
| 15:30 EEST (UTC+03:00) | | | | Stadium: Inhulets Stadium |

| 24 April 2027 24 | FC Chernihiv | x–x | Metalist Kharkiv | Chernihiv |
| 15:30 EEST (UTC+03:00) | | | | Stadium: Chernihiv Arena |

| 1 May 2027 25 | FC Chernihiv | x–x | Poltava | Chernihiv |
| 15:30 EEST (UTC+03:00) | | | | Stadium: Chernihiv Arena |

| 8 May 2027 26 | Prykarpattia-Blaho | x–x | FC Chernihiv | Ivano-Frankivsk |
| 15:30 EEST (UTC+03:00) | | | | Stadium: Rukh |

| 15 May 2027 27 | FC Chernihiv | x–x | Viktoriya Sumy | Chernihiv |
| 15:30 EEST (UTC+03:00) | | | | Stadium: Chernihiv Arena |

| 22 May 2027 28 | Ahrobiznes Volochysk | x–x | FC Chernihiv | Volochysk |
| 15:30 EEST (UTC+03:00) | | | | Stadium: Yunist Stadium |

| 28 May 2027 29 | Feniks-Mariupol | x–x | FC Chernihiv | Lviv |
| 15:30 EEST (UTC+03:00) | | | | Stadium: Skif |

| 3 June 2027 30 | Kolos-2 Kovalivka | x–x | FC Chernihiv | Obukhiv |
| 15:30 EEST (UTC+03:00) | | | | Stadium: imeni Melnyka |

=== Ukrainian Cup ===
| 23 August 2026 Round of 64 (1/32) | LSTM 536 Lutsk | 1–2 | Chernihiv | Lutsk |
| EEST (UTC+3) | Bandura 12'; Teterenko (yellow card) 67'; Maksymchuk (yellow card) 75' | Report | Serdyuk (yellow card) 8'; Shalfeyev 54'; Rohozynskyi (yellow card) 57'; Haloian 63' | Stadium: Avanhard Stadium; Attendance: 760; Referee: Viktor Solovyov (Odesa) |

| 6 October 2026 Round of 32 (1/16) | Trostianets | 2–4 | Chernihiv | Trostyanets |
| EEST (UTC+3) | Shmygaryov (yellow card) 22'; Buryak 23'; Buryak 35'; Taranushych (yellow card) 76'; Cheglov (yellow card) 90+1' | Report | Fatyeyev (yellow card) 37'; Shumylo 46'; Novikov 76'; Novikov 83'; Bezborodko 90+4' | Stadium: Kuts Stadium |

| 28 October 2026 Round of 16 (1/8) | Chernihiv | Postponed | Epitsentr | Chernihiv |
| EEST (UTC+3) | | | | Stadium: Chernihiv Arena |

| 29 October 2026 Round of 16 (1/8) | Chernihiv | 1–2 | Epitsentr | Shchaslyve |
| EEST (UTC+3) | Bezghubchenko 45+2' | Report | Myronyuk 24'; Yevpak 86' | Stadium: Knyazha-Arena (Arsenal-Arena) |

== Statistics ==
=== Appearances and goals ===
| No. | Pos | Nat | Player | Total | | Ukrainian First League | | Ukrainian Cup | | Play-offs | |
| No. | Pos | Nat | Player | Apps | Goals | Apps | Goals | Apps | Goals | Apps | Goals |
Goalkeepers
| 22 | GK | (Ukraine) UKR | Oleksandr Roshchynskyi | 0 | 0 | 0 | 0 | 0 | 0 | 0 | 0 |
| 35 | GK | (Ukraine) UKR | Maksym Tatarenko | 15 | 0 | 13 | 0 | 2 | 0 | 0 | 0 |
| 99 | GK | (Ukraine) UKR | Denys Herasymenko | 3 | 0 | 2 | 0 | 1 | 0 | 0 | 0 |
Defenders
| 2 | DF | (Armenia) ARM | Eduard Halstyan | 13 | 1 | 12 | 1 | 1 | 0 | 0 | 0 |
| 3 | DF | (Ukraine) UKR | Maksym Shumylo | 2 | 1 | 1 | 0 | 1 | 1 | 0 | 0 |
| 20 | DF | (Ukraine) UKR | Dmytro Fatyeyev | 12 | 1 | 10 | 1 | 2 | 0 | 0 | 0 |
| 23 | DF | (Ukraine) UKR | Oleksiy Zenchenko | 10 | 0 | 8 | 0 | 2 | 0 | 0 | 0 |
| 38 | DF | (Ukraine) UKR | Pavlo Shushko | 7 | 0 | 5 | 0 | 2 | 0 | 0 | 0 |
Midfielders
| 6 | MF | (Ukraine) UKR | Yehor Shalfeyev | 16 | 2 | 13 | 1 | 3 | 1 | 0 | 0 |
| 7 | MF | (Ukraine) UKR | Dmytro Myronenko | 7 | 0 | 6 | 0 | 1 | 0 | 0 | 0 |
| 8 | MF | (Ukraine) UKR | Artur Bybik | 8 | 0 | 7 | 0 | 1 | 0 | 0 | 0 |
| 10 | MF | (Ukraine) UKR | Vyacheslav Koydan | 11 | 1 | 9 | 1 | 2 | 0 | 0 | 0 |
| 12 | MF | (Ukraine) UKR | Yehor Kartushov | 14 | 1 | 13 | 1 | 1 | 0 | 0 | 0 |
| 13 | MF | (Russia) RUS | Simon Haloian | 14 | 2 | 11 | 1 | 3 | 1 | 0 | 0 |
| 15 | MF | (Ukraine) UKR | Dzhilindo Bezghubchenko | 16 | 2 | 13 | 1 | 3 | 1 | 0 | 0 |
| 24 | MF | (Ukraine) UKR | Dmytro Didok | 2 | 0 | 1 | 0 | 1 | 0 | 0 | 0 |
| 26 | MF | (Tajikistan) TJK | Davronbek Azizov | 8 | 0 | 6 | 0 | 2 | 0 | 0 | 0 |
| 33 | MF | (Ukraine) UKR | Andriy Porokhnya | 15 | 0 | 12 | 0 | 3 | 0 | 0 | 0 |
| 44 | MF | (Ukraine) UKR | Dmytro Plakhtyr | 14 | 1 | 11 | 1 | 3 | 0 | 0 | 0 |
| 55 | MF | (Ukraine) UKR | Anatoliy Romanchenko | 31 | 1 | 10 | 1 | 21 | 0 | 0 | 0 |
| 77 | MF | (Ukraine) UKR | Maksym Serdyuk | 16 | 2 | 13 | 2 | 3 | 0 | 0 | 0 |
| 80 | MF | (Ukraine) UKR | Nikita Terrekhovets | 0 | 0 | 0 | 0 | 0 | 0 | 0 | 0 |
| 87 | MF | (Ukraine) UKR | Valeriy Rohozynskyi | 16 | 0 | 13 | 0 | 3 | 0 | 0 | 0 |
Forwards
| 9 | FW | (Ukraine) UKR | Dmytro Kulyk | 0 | 0 | 0 | 0 | 0 | 0 | 0 | 0 |
| 11 | FW | (Ukraine) UKR | Andriy Novikov | 11 | 4 | 8 | 2 | 3 | 2 | 0 | 0 |
| 21 | FW | (Ukraine) UKR | Denys Bezborodko | 12 | 1 | 10 | 0 | 2 | 1 | 0 | 0 |
| 69 | FW | (Ukraine) UKR | Ilya Yevchenko | 0 | 0 | 0 | 0 | 0 | 0 | 0 | 0 |
Players transferred out during the season

Source: Competitions

Last updated: 21 November 2026

=== Goalscorers ===
| Rank | No. | Pos | Nat | Name | Second League | Cup | Play-offs | Total |
|---|---|---|---|---|---|---|---|---|
| 1 | 11 | FW | (Ukraine) | Andriy Novikov | 2 | 2 | 0 | 4 |
| 2 | 77 | MF | (Ukraine) | Maksym Serdyuk | 2 | 0 | 0 | 2 |
| 3 | 13 | MF | (Russia) | Simon Haloian | 1 | 1 | 0 | 2 |
| 4 | 15 | MF | (Ukraine) | Dzhilindo Bezghubchenko | 1 | 1 | 0 | 2 |
| 5 | 6 | MF | (Ukraine) | Yehor Shalfyeyev | 1 | 1 | 0 | 2 |
| 6 | 2 | DF | (Armenia) | Eduard Halstyan | 1 | 0 | 0 | 1 |
| 7 | 55 | MF | (Ukraine) | Anatoliy Romanchenko | 1 | 0 | 0 | 1 |
| 8 | 20 | DF | (Ukraine) | Dmytro Fatyeyev | 1 | 0 | 0 | 1 |
| 9 | 10 | MF | (Ukraine) | Vyacheslav Koydan | 1 | 0 | 0 | 1 |
| 10 | 12 | MF | (Ukraine) | Yehor Kartushov | 1 | 0 | 0 | 1 |
| 11 | 44 | MF | (Ukraine) | Dmytro Plakhtyr | 1 | 0 | 0 | 1 |
| 12 | 3 | DF | (Ukraine) | Maksym Shumylo | 0 | 1 | 0 | 1 |
| 13 | 21 | FW | (Ukraine) | Denys Bezborodko | 0 | 1 | 0 | 1 |
| | | | | Total | 13 | 5 | 0 | 18 |

Last updated: 1 November 2026

=== Clean sheets ===
| Rank | No. | Pos | Nat | Name | First League | Cup | Play-offs | Total |
|---|---|---|---|---|---|---|---|---|
| 1 | 35 | GK | (Ukraine) | Maksym Tatarenko | 2 | 0 | 0 | 2 |
| | | | | Total | 2 | 0 | 0 | 2 |

Last updated: 11 October 2026

=== Disciplinary record ===
| No. | Pos | Nat | Player | First League | | | Ukrainian Cup | | | Play-offs | | | Total | | |
| No. | Pos | Nat | Player | Yellow card | (yellow card) (yellow-red card) | Red card | Yellow card | (yellow card) (yellow-red card) | Red card | Yellow card | (yellow card) (yellow-red card) | Red card | Yellow card | (yellow card) (yellow-red card) | Red card |
| 44 | MF | (Ukraine) | Dmytro Plakhtyr | 3 | 0 | 1 | 0 | 0 | 0 | 0 | 0 | 0 | 4 | 0 | 1 |
| 21 | FW | (Ukraine) | Denys Bezborodko | 3 | 0 | 0 | 0 | 0 | 0 | 0 | 0 | 0 | 3 | 0 | 0 |
| 23 | DF | (Ukraine) | Oleksiy Zenchenko | 2 | 0 | 0 | 1 | 0 | 0 | 0 | 0 | 0 | 3 | 0 | 0 |
| 38 | DF | (Ukraine) | Pavlo Shushko | 2 | 0 | 0 | 0 | 0 | 0 | 0 | 0 | 0 | 2 | 0 | 0 |
| 13 | MF | (Russia) | Simon Haloian | 2 | 0 | 0 | 0 | 0 | 0 | 0 | 0 | 0 | 2 | 0 | 0 |
| 55 | DF | (Ukraine) | Anatoliy Romanchenko | 2 | 0 | 0 | 0 | 0 | 0 | 0 | 0 | 0 | 2 | 0 | 0 |
| 8 | MF | (Ukraine) | Artur Bybik | 2 | 0 | 0 | 0 | 0 | 0 | 0 | 0 | 0 | 2 | 0 | 0 |
| 12 | MF | (Ukraine) | Yehor Kartushov | 2 | 0 | 0 | 0 | 0 | 0 | 0 | 0 | 0 | 2 | 0 | 0 |
| 20 | DF | (Ukraine) | Dmytro Fatyeyev | 1 | 0 | 0 | 1 | 0 | 0 | 0 | 0 | 0 | 2 | 0 | 0 |
| 77 | MF | (Ukraine) | Maksym Serdyuk | 1 | 0 | 0 | 1 | 0 | 0 | 0 | 0 | 0 | 2 | 0 | 0 |
| 87 | MF | (Ukraine) | Valeriy Rohozynskyi | 1 | 0 | 0 | 1 | 0 | 0 | 0 | 0 | 0 | 2 | 0 | 0 |
| 6 | MF | (Ukraine) | Yehor Shalfyeyev | 1 | 0 | 0 | 0 | 0 | 0 | 0 | 0 | 0 | 1 | 0 | 0 |
| 35 | GK | (Ukraine) | Maksym Tatarenko | 1 | 0 | 1 | 0 | 0 | 0 | 0 | 0 | 0 | 1 | 0 | 1 |
| 77 | MF | (Ukraine) | Maksym Serdyuk | 1 | 0 | 0 | 0 | 0 | 0 | 0 | 0 | 0 | 1 | 0 | 0 |
| 11 | FW | (Ukraine) | Andriy Novikov | 1 | 0 | 0 | 0 | 0 | 0 | 0 | 0 | 0 | 1 | 0 | 0 |
| 26 | MF | (Tajikistan) | Davronbek Azizov | 1 | 0 | 0 | 0 | 0 | 0 | 0 | 0 | 0 | 1 | 0 | 0 |
| 7 | MF | (Ukraine) | Dmytro Myronenko | 1 | 0 | 0 | 0 | 0 | 0 | 0 | 0 | 0 | 1 | 0 | 0 |
| 2 | DF | (Armenia) | Eduard Halstyan | 1 | 0 | 0 | 0 | 0 | 0 | 0 | 0 | 0 | 1 | 0 | 0 |
| 33 | MF | (Ukraine) | Andriy Porokhnya | 1 | 0 | 0 | 0 | 0 | 0 | 0 | 0 | 0 | 1 | 0 | 0 |
| | | | Total | 25 | 0 | 2 | 4 | 0 | 0 | 0 | 0 | 0 | 29 | 0 | 2 |

Last updated: 21 November 2026
