= 2022 UAF Regions' Cup =

Tournament details
- Country: Ukraine
- Dates: 3 August – 15 August
- Teams: 10

Final positions
- Champions: Ivano-Frankivsk Oblast (1st title)
- Runners-up: Lviv Oblast
- Semifinalists: Poltava Oblast; Cherkasy Oblast
- 2023 UEFA Regions' Cup: Ivano-Frankivsk Oblast

Tournament statistics
- Matches played: 8

2022 UAF Regions' Cup (Ukrainian: Кубок регіонів УАФ, Kubok rehioniv UAF) was the third season of the Ukrainian Association of Football renewed competition at regional level. The competition was conducted among football teams of Oblasts (regions) composed of players who compete at oblast championships (regional competitions).

The winner of the competition would represent Ukraine at the 2023 UEFA Regions' Cup.

== Competition schedule ==
=== Preliminaries ===
3 August 2022	Lviv Oblast	11–0	Volyn Oblast	Stadion imeni Markevycha, Vynnyky
	Oleh Matselyukh 10', 73'; Andriy Lebedenko 19'; Rostyslav Mykhalchuk 42' (pen.); Ivan Yuskevych 49'; Volodymyr Popyl 57', 65'; Nazar Slaviak 63'; Andriy Olenych 85', 86'	Report	Vladyslav Blashchuk 13' (o.g.)

3 August 2022	Vinnytsia Oblast	2–2 (a.e.t.)	Khmelnytskyi Oblast
	Volodymyr Holub ?'; Ivan Ovsianytskyi (yellow card) ?' (yellow-red card) ?' ? 118' (pen.)	Report	? 68' ? 100'

=== Quarterfinals ===
8 August 2022	Lviv Oblast	4–1	Vinnytsia Oblast	Stadion imeni Markevycha, Vynnyky
	Vitaliy Ravlyk 11', 13'; Andriy Olenych 17'; Andriy Lebedenko 31'	Report	Vadym Kotsiubnyak 50'

3 August 2022	Poltava Oblast	2–1	Donetsk Oblast

3 August 2022	Ivano-Frankivsk Oblast	6–0	Chernivtsi Oblast	Hirka Stadium, Ivano-Frankivsk
15:00	Maksym Stadnik 3', 56'; Andriy Bodnaruk 28', 80'; Svyatoslav Shevchenko 65', 71'	Report		Attendance: 0

3 August 2022	Cherkasy Oblast	3–2	Zhytomyr Oblast	Central Stadium, Uman
14:00	Liubchenko 27'; Pohrebniak 66'	Report	Postolatyev 4'; Masalyov 67' (o.g.); Yavorskyi 69'

=== Semifinals ===
13 August 2022	Ivano-Frankivsk Oblast	3–0	Cherkasy Oblast	Stadion OKIP, Kyiv
	Andriy Bodnaruk ?'; Maksym Stadnik ?', ?'	Report

13 August 2022	Lviv Oblast	3–0	Poltava Oblast	Knyazha Arena, Shchaslyve
	Roman Hnativ 43'; Volodymyr Popyl 67', 76'	Report

=== Final ===
15 August 2022	Ivano-Frankivsk Oblast	3–2 (a.e.t.)	Lviv Oblast	Bannikov Stadium, Kyiv
	Myroslav Kamradskyi 88', 116'; Volodymyr Danyshchuk 97'	Report; Report	Roman Hnativ 31'; Rostyslav Mykhalchuk 120+1'

== Bracket ==
Round of 16
Lviv Oblast	11
Volyn Oblast	0
Vinnytsia Oblast (p)	2(6)
Khmelnytskyi Oblast	2(5)

Quarterfinals
Lviv Oblast	4
Vinnytsia Oblast	1
Poltava Oblast	2
Donetsk Oblast	1
Ivano-Frankivsk Oblast	6
Chernivtsi Oblast	0
Cherkasy Oblast	3
Zhytomyr Oblast	2

Semifinals
Lviv Oblast	3
Poltava Oblast	0
Ivano-Frankivsk Oblast	3
Cherkasy Oblast	0

Final
Lviv Oblast	2
Ivano-Frankivsk Oblast (a.e.t.)	3
