= 2019 Football Championship of Lviv Oblast =

Football Championship of Lviv Oblast
- Season: 2019
- Champions: Yunist Verkhnia Bilka

The 2019 Football Championship of Lviv Oblast was won by Yunist Verkhnia Bilka.

== Teams ==
=== Promoted ===
- Sokil Borshchovychi – 1st place in the 2018 Lviv Oblast First League
- FC Halychyna Drohobych – 4th place in the 2018 Lviv Oblast First League

=== Merged/reorganized ===
- Sokil Borshchovychi before the season's start changed its name to "Lviv-Sokil" Borshchovychi and after the Round 18 it was replaced by the FC Lviv football academy.
- FC Rochyn Sosnivka that competed in the 2018–19 Ukrainian Football Amateur League merged with Enerhetyk Dobrotvir as Enerhetyk-Rochyn Dobrotvir.

== Premier League table ==
Pos	Team	Pld	W	D	L	GF	GA	GD	Pts	Notes
1	FC Mykolaiv	22	19	2	1	80	14	+66	59	Qualified for the Gold Match
2	Yunist Verkhnia Bilka (C)	22	19	2	1	67	15	+52	59	Qualified for the Gold Match
3	SCC Demnia	22	16	3	3	65	18	+47	51	
4	Feniks-Stefano Pidmonastyr	22	12	4	6	51	35	+16	40	
5	Pogoń Lviv	22	10	1	11	41	40	+1	31	
6	Hirnyk Novoyavorivsk	22	8	5	9	31	33	−2	29	
7	FC Sambir	22	7	7	8	40	39	+1	28	
8	Halychyna Drohobych	22	4	8	10	20	35	−15	20	
9	Yunist Giiche	22	4	6	12	26	61	−35	18	
10	Lokomotyv Rava-Ruska	22	4	5	13	21	50	−29	17	
11	DYuSh Lviv	22	5	1	16	27	68	−41	16	
12	Enerhetyk Dobrotvir	22	1	2	19	23	84	−61	5	
13	FC Mostyska	10	1	2	7	11	20	−9	5	Withdrew
14	Dumna Remeniv	7	1	1	5	7	14	−7	4	Withdrew

Source:"Чемпіонат Львівської області 2019". Footboom. Archived from the original on 2020-06-20.; "Прем'єр-ліга Львівської області". ЛЬВІВСЬКА АСОЦІАЦІЯ ФУТБОЛУ.
Notes:
* Results of FC Mostyska and Dumna Remeniv were annulled.

=== Gold match ===
10 November 2019	FC Mykolaiv	1 – 2 (a.e.t.)	Yunist Verkhnia Bilka	Skif Stadium, Lviv
13:00 EEST	Synyshyn 12'	Report; Report	Boiko 58'; Kurylyshyn 103'	Referee: Yuriy Hrysio
