= 2018 FFU Regions' Cup =

Tournament details
- Country: Ukraine
- Dates: 24 April 2018 – 20 June 2018
- Teams: 26

Final positions
- Champions: Lviv Oblast (1st title)
- Runners-up: Sumy Oblast
- Semifinalists: Odesa Oblast; Zhytomyr Oblast
- 2019 UEFA Regions' Cup: Lviv Oblast

Tournament statistics
- Matches played: 22

2018 FFU Regions' Cup (Ukrainian: Кубок регіонів ФФУ 2018, Kubok rehioniv FFU) was the second season of the Football Federation of Ukraine renewed competition at regional level. The competition was conducted among football teams of Oblasts (regions) composed of players who compete at oblast championships (regional competitions).

The winner of the competition represented Ukraine at the 2019 UEFA Regions' Cup.

== Tournament structure ==
The 2018 FFU Regions' Cup competition changed its tournament structure compare to its previous season two year ago.

This season competition was arranged in three stages. The first stage (April 24–26) had 24 participants and organized into a mini-tournament in six groups of four with two teams that played in the 2016 final receiving a bye for the stage along with the mini tournament group winners. The second stage (May 15–17) was a group stage had eight participants split into two groups of four with winners of each group advancing to the final game. The third stage was the final that took place on 20 June 2018.

== Competition schedule ==
=== First stage ===
composition

==== Group1 ====
in Ivano-Frankivsk, Khet-Tryk Stadium

===== Semifinals =====
Team 1	Score	Team 2
Ternopil Oblast	2–1	Zakarpattia Oblast
Ivano-Frankivsk Oblast	4–0	Chernivtsi Oblast

===== Finals =====
Team 1	Score	Team 2
Ivano-Frankivsk Oblast	6–1	Ternopil Oblast

==== Group 2 ====
===== Semifinals =====
in Rafalivka, RAF-BRUK Stadium

Team 1	Score	Team 2
Rivne Oblast	3–1 (a.e.t.)	Volyn Oblast
Vinnytsia Oblast	4–1	Khmelnytskyi Oblast

===== Final =====
in Vinnytsia, Olimp Stadium

Team 1	Score	Team 2
Vinnytsia Oblast	4–0	Rivne Oblast

==== Group 3 ====
in Lyutizh, Dinaz Stadium

===== Semifinals =====
Team 1	Score	Team 2
Kyiv Oblast	+:–	Kyiv
Zhytomyr Oblast	3–1	Chernihiv Oblast

===== Finals =====
Team 1	Score	Team 2
Kyiv Oblast	1–3 (a.e.t.)	Zhytomyr Oblast

==== Group 4 ====
in Mykolaiv, Park Peremohy Stadium (Match 1) and Kherson, Combined Sports School (KDYuSSh) Stadium (Match 2)

===== Semifinals =====
Team 1	Score	Team 2
Mykolaiv Oblast	0–1	Kherson Oblast
Odesa Oblast	7–0	(Autonomous Republic of Crimea) Crimea

===== Finals =====
in Kherson, Combined Sports School (KDYuSSh) Stadium

Team 1	Score	Team 2
Kherson Oblast	0–1	Odesa Oblast

==== Group 5 ====
in Kramatorsk, Pole u sadu Bernatskoho

===== Semifinals =====
Team 1	Score	Team 2
Donetsk Oblast	6–2	Dnipropetrovsk Oblast
Luhansk Oblast	+:–	(Zaporizhzhia Oblast) Zaporizhia Oblast

===== Finals =====
Team 1	Score	Team 2
Donetsk Oblast	3–0	Luhansk Oblast

==== Group 6 ====
in Kharkiv, stadium of the Kharkiv National University of Internal Affairs

===== Semifinals =====
Team 1	Score	Team 2
Kharkiv Oblast	1–0 (a.e.t.)	Cherkasy Oblast
Poltava Oblast	1–4	Sumy Oblast

===== Finals =====
Team 1	Score	Team 2
Kharkiv Oblast	2–4	Sumy Oblast

=== Second stage ===
All games were played on 15 and 16 May. For the stage qualified football teams of following regions Ivano-Frankivsk, Zhytomyr, Lviv, Kirovohrad, Sumy, Donetsk.

==== Group A ====
in Ivano-Frankivsk, Khet-Tryk Stadium

===== Semifinals =====
Team 1	Score	Team 2
Lviv Oblast	0–0 (7–6 p)	Ivano-Frankivsk Oblast
Vinnytsia Oblast	0–3	Zhytomyr Oblast

===== Finals =====
Team 1	Score	Team 2
Lviv Oblast	2–1	Zhytomyr Oblast

==== Group B ====
in Mykolaivka, Sumy

===== Semifinals =====
Team 1	Score	Team 2
Sumy Oblast	2–1	Donetsk Oblast
Odesa Oblast	w/o	Kirovohrad Oblast

===== Finals =====
Team 1	Score	Team 2
Sumy Oblast	3–0	Odesa Oblast

=== Final ===
Final was played on 23 June 2018.

23 June 2018	Lviv Oblast	2–1 (a.e.t.)	Sumy Oblast	Bannikov Stadium, Kyiv
	Leskiv 37'; Fostakovskyi 99'	Report	Tarabara 65'

== Bracket ==
Round of 32
Ivano-Frankivsk Oblast	4
Chernivtsi Oblast	0
Ternopil Oblast	2
Zakarpattia Oblast	1
Lviv Oblast
bye (no team)
bye (no team)
bye (no team)
Vinnytsia Oblast	4
Khmelnytskyi Oblast	1
Volyn Oblast	1
Rivne Oblast (a.e.t.)	3
Kyiv Oblast	+
Kyiv City	–
Zhytomyr Oblast	3
Chernihiv Oblast	1
Kharkiv Oblast (a.e.t.)	1
Cherkasy Oblast	0
Poltava Oblast	1
Sumy Oblast	4
Donetsk Oblast	6
Dnipropetrovsk Oblast	2
Luhansk Oblast	+
Zaporizhia Oblast	–
Mykolaiv Oblast	0
Kherson Oblast	1
Odesa Oblast	7
AR Crimea	0
Kirovohrad Oblast
bye (no team)
bye (no team)
bye (no team)

Round of 16
Ivano-Frankivsk Oblast	6
Ternopil Oblast	1
Lviv Oblast
bye (no team)
Vinnytsia Oblast	4
Rivne Oblast	0
Kyiv Oblast	1
Zhytomyr Oblast (a.e.t.)	3
Kharkiv Oblast	2
Sumy Oblast	4
Donetsk Oblast	3
Luhansk Oblast	0
Kherson Oblast	0
Odesa Oblast	3
Kirovohrad Oblast
no (team)

Quarterfinals
Ivano-Frankivsk Oblast	0(6)
Lviv Oblast (p)	0(7)
Vinnytsia Oblast	0
Zhytomyr Oblast	3
Sumy Oblast	2
Donetsk Oblast	1
Odesa Oblast	+
Kirovohrad Oblast	–

Semifinals
Lviv Oblast	2
Zhytomyr Oblast	1
Sumy Oblast	3
Odesa Oblast	0

Final
Lviv Oblast (a.e.t.)	2
Sumy Oblast	1

== See also ==
- FFU Council of Regions
