= Davronbek Azizov =

Ukrainian footballer (born 2000)

Personal information
- Full name: Davronbek Zulfikorovych Azizov
- Date of birth: 13 July 2000 (age 26)
- Place of birth: Dushanbe, Tajikistan
- Height: 1.78 m (5 ft 10 in)
- Position: Left-back

Team information
- Current team: Chernihiv
- Number: 26

Youth career
- 2010: DYuSSh-1 Kyiv
- 2011: SDYuSSoR-9 Zmina
- 2013–2015: KDYuSSh-9 Kharkiv
- 2015–2017: Metalist Kharkiv

Senior career*
Years	Team	Apps	(Gls)
2017–2020	Zorya Luhansk	0	(0)
2020–2022	Enerhetyk Solonytsivka	26	(3)
2022–2024	Kremin Kremenchuk	42	(6)
2024	Bukovyna Chernivtsi	4	(0)
2025–2026	Podillya Khmelnytskyi	35	(2)
2026–	Chernihiv	6	(0)

International career
2017	Ukraine U17	2	(0)
2019	Ukraine U19	2	(0)
- * Club domestic league appearances and goals as of 21 November 2026

Davronbek Zulfikorovych Azizov (Ukrainian: Давронбек Зульфікорович Азізов; born 13 July 2000) is a Ukrainian professional footballer who plays as a left-back for Ukrainian club Chernihiv.

== Career ==
=== Early life & career ===
Azaov was born in Dushanbe, Tajikistan on 13 July 2000. At early age his family moved to Ukraine. Azizov is a product of many sport schools and academies. He attended and played for DYuSSh-1 in Kyiv during 2010, SDYuSShOR-9 "Zmina" in Kyiv. In 2013 he moved to Kharkiv and attended KDYuSSh-9, where during three seasons he played in forty matches and scored fourteen times. He also trained at the Metalist Kharkiv academy. While playing for Metalist in the Ukrainian Youth Football League, Azizov scored four goals in forty matches.

=== Zorya Luhansk ===
During the summer of 2017, Azizov signed with Ukrainian Premier League club Zorya Luhansk. During his time there he played in Ukrainian Premier League Under-21 and Under-19. Azizov made fifty seven appearances and scored ten goals. His contract ended in summer of 2020.

=== Enerhetyk Solonytsivka ===
In July 2020, Azizov joined an amateur club Enerhetyk Solonytsivka playing in Kharkiv Oblast Championship. During his two seasons with the club, he played in twenty-six matches and scored three times. During his time with the club, during the winter breaks he played futsal for Sokil Kharkiv.

=== Kremin ===
He signed with Kremin in February 2022 for a year and a half contract. Davronbek signed a new one-year contract in July 2023. On 12 June 2024 Azizov was released by Kremin having made forty-two appearances and scoring six goals.

=== Bukovyna ===
Azizov joined Ukrainian First League club Bukovyna Chernivtsi in June 2024. He left the club in November of that year. Azizov made six appearances for the club. Four of those were in the First League and two in the cup.

=== Podillya ===
In January 2025, Azizov joined another First League club Podillya Khmelnytskyi. During the first half of the 2025-26 season, Azizov played in seventeen league matches scoring one goal. He also played once in the cup.

=== Chernihiv ===
On 4 July 2026, he signed for Chernihiv in Ukrainian First League. On 25 July 2026, he made his debut with the new club against Lokomotyv Kyiv in Ukrainian First League.

== Style of play ==
Azizov played as a left-back in the academy. When he joined Zorya Luhansk, he began playing as a defensive midfielder also. Azizov covers the whole left wing making solo attacking runs. His proficiency with his left foot helps him deliver accurate crosses.

== International career ==
In August 2016, Azizov played for Ukraine U17 in both matches against Estonia. During 2018 he played in two matches against USA and Czech Republic for Ukraine U19.

== Personal life ==
His father is a former CSKA Pamir Dushanbe and Tajikistan national football team player Zulfikar Azizov.

== Career statistics ==
=== Club ===
As of match played 21 November 2026

Appearances and goals by club, season and competition
Club	Season	League			Cup		Europe		Other		Total	
Club	Season	Division	Apps	Goals	Apps	Goals	Apps	Goals	Apps	Goals	Apps	Goals
Kremin Kremenchuk	2022–23	Ukrainian First League	19	4	0	0	0	0	0	0	19	4
Kremin Kremenchuk	2023–24	Ukrainian First League	23	2	0	0	0	0	0	0	23	2
Bukovyna Chernivtsi	2024–25	Ukrainian First League	4	0	0	0	0	0	0	0	4	0
Podillya Khmelnytskyi	2024–25	Ukrainian First League	7	1	0	0	0	0	2	0	11	1
Podillya Khmelnytskyi	2025–26	Ukrainian First League	28	1	1	0	0	0	0	0	29	1
Chernihiv	2026–27	Ukrainian First League	6	0	2	0	0	0	0	0	8	0
Career total			87	8	3	0	0	0	4	0	93	8
