= Dmytro Plakhtyr =

Ukrainian association football player (born 1996)

Personal information
- Full name: Dmytro Hennadiyovych Plakhtyr
- Date of birth: 14 February 1996 (age 30)
- Place of birth: Zaporizhzhia, Ukraine
- Height: 1.87 m (6 ft 1 1/2 in)
- Position: Midfielder

Team information
- Current team: Chernihiv
- Number: 44

Youth career
- 2009–2013: Metalurh Zaporizhzhia

Senior career*
| Years | Team | Apps | (Gls) |
| 2013–2015 | Metalurh Zaporizhzhia | 3 | (0) |
| 2016 | Oleksandriya | 0 | (0) |
| 2016–2017 | Metalurh Zaporizhzhia | 16 | (0) |
| 2017–2018 | Unia Solec Kujawski | 25 | (2) |
| 2018–2019 | Tavria-Skif Rozdol | 14 | (7) |
| 2019–2022 | Motor Zaporizhzhia | 74 | (29) |
| 2022–2023 | Skoruk Tomakivka | 19 | (1) |
| 2023–2026 | Poltava | 66 | (5) |
| 2026– | Chernihiv | 11 | (1) |
- * Club domestic league appearances and goals as of 21 November 2026

Dmytro Hennadiyovych Plakhtyr (Ukrainian: Дмитро Геннадійович Плахтир; born 14 February 1996) is a Ukrainian professional footballer who plays as a midfielder for Chernihiv.

== Career ==
Plakhtyr is a product of Metalurh Zaporizhzhia's youth system. His first trainer was Mykola Syenovalov.

=== Metalurh Zaporizhzhia ===
He made his Ukrainian Premier League debut for Metalurh in a match against Dnipro Dnipropetrovsk on 12 September 2015.

=== Skoruk Tomakivka ===
In 2022, he signed for Skoruk Tomakivka in Ukrainian First League.

=== Poltava ===
In 2023 he moved to Poltava , where he helped the club to be promoted in Ukrainian Premier League. In July 2025, he signed a new contract with the club. On 11 November 2025, he scored against Kryvbas Kryvyi Rih at the Hirnyk Stadium in Kryvyi Rih. In the summer of 2026, his contract expired and he was released and some rumours linked him with a possible transfer to Kolos-2 Kovalivka.

=== Chernihiv ===
On 6 June 2026, he signed for FC Chernihiv in Ukrainian First League. On 25 July 2026, he made his debut with the new club against Lokomotyv Kyiv. On 11 October 2026, he scored his first goal with the new club against Prykarpattia-Blaho at the MCS Rukh stadium in Ivano-Frankivsk. Due to his performance in the match against Prykarpattia-Blaho, he was included in the Best XI of Round 11 of the 2026–27 Ukrainian First League.

== Career statistics ==
=== Club ===
As of match played 21 November 2026

Appearances and goals by club, season and competition
| Club | Season | League | | | Cup | | Europe | | Other | | Total | |
| Club | Season | Division | Apps | Goals | Apps | Goals | Apps | Goals | Apps | Goals | Apps | Goals |
|---|---|---|---|---|---|---|---|---|---|---|---|---|
| Metalurh Zaporizhzhia | 2013–14 | Ukrainian Premier League | 0 | 0 | 0 | 0 | 0 | 0 | 0 | 0 | 0 | 0 |
| Metalurh Zaporizhzhia | 2014–15 | Ukrainian Premier League | 0 | 0 | 0 | 0 | 0 | 0 | 0 | 0 | 0 | 0 |
| Metalurh Zaporizhzhia | 2015–16 | Ukrainian Premier League | 3 | 0 | 0 | 0 | 0 | 0 | 0 | 0 | 2 | 0 |
| Metalurh Zaporizhzhia | 2016–17 | Ukrainian Second League | 16 | 0 | 1 | 0 | 0 | 0 | 0 | 0 | 17 | 0 |
| Unia Solec Kujawski | 2017–18 | IV liga Kuyavia-Pomerania | 25 | 2 | 0 | 0 | 0 | 0 | 0 | 0 | 25 | 2 |
| Tavria-Skif Rozdol | 2018–19 | Ukrainian Amateur League | 14 | 7 | 0 | 0 | 0 | 0 | 0 | 0 | 14 | 7 |
| Motor Zaporizhzhia | 2019–20 | Ukrainian Amateur League | 0 | 0 | 0 | 0 | 0 | 0 | 0 | 0 | 17 | 0 |
| Motor Zaporizhzhia | 2020–21 | Ukrainian Amateur League | 0 | 0 | 0 | 0 | 0 | 0 | 0 | 0 | 0 | 0 |
| Motor Zaporizhzhia | 2021–22 | Ukrainian Amateur League | 0 | 0 | 0 | 0 | 0 | 0 | 0 | 0 | 0 | 0 |
| Skoruk Tomakivka | 2022–23 | Ukrainian First League | 19 | 1 | 0 | 0 | 0 | 0 | 0 | 0 | 19 | 1 |
| Poltava | 2023–24 | Ukrainian First League | 19 | 0 | 0 | 0 | 0 | 0 | 0 | 0 | 19 | 0 |
| Poltava | 2024–25 | Ukrainian First League | 22 | 3 | 2 | 1 | 0 | 0 | 0 | 0 | 24 | 5 |
| Poltava | 2025–26 | Ukrainian Premier League | 27 | 2 | 0 | 0 | 0 | 0 | 0 | 0 | 27 | 2 |
| Chernihiv | 2026–27 | Ukrainian First League | 11 | 1 | 3 | 0 | 0 | 0 | 0 | 0 | 14 | 1 |
| Career total | | | 0 | 0 | 0 | 0 | 0 | 0 | 0 | 0 | 0 | 0 |

== Honours ==
FC Motor Zaporizhzhia

- Zaporizhzhia Oblast Championshipː (3) 2019, 2020, 2021

Unia Solec Kujawski

- IV liga Cuyavia-Pomerania: 2016–17
