= Pogoń Lwów (2009) =

Polish sports club in Lviv, Ukraine

- logo since 2013
- Full name: Lwowski Klub Sportowy Pogoń Lwów
- Founded: 2009
- Ground: "Hart" (vul. Oleksandra Olesia, 25)
- Capacity: about 1 000
- Chairman: Marek Horbań
- Manager: Vitaliy Lobasyuk
- League: Lviv Oblast Premier League
- 2021: Lviv Oblast Premier League, 9th of 13
- Website: pogon.lwow.net
Home colours	Away colours

original logo

LKS Pogoń Lwów (Ukrainian: Погонь Львів) is a Polish diaspora sports club which was located in Lviv in Ukraine. It was founded in 2009 by Poles in Ukraine to continue the traditions of the original club of the same name, which was a very successful Polish club when the city was still part of Poland.

== History ==
=== Predecessor ===
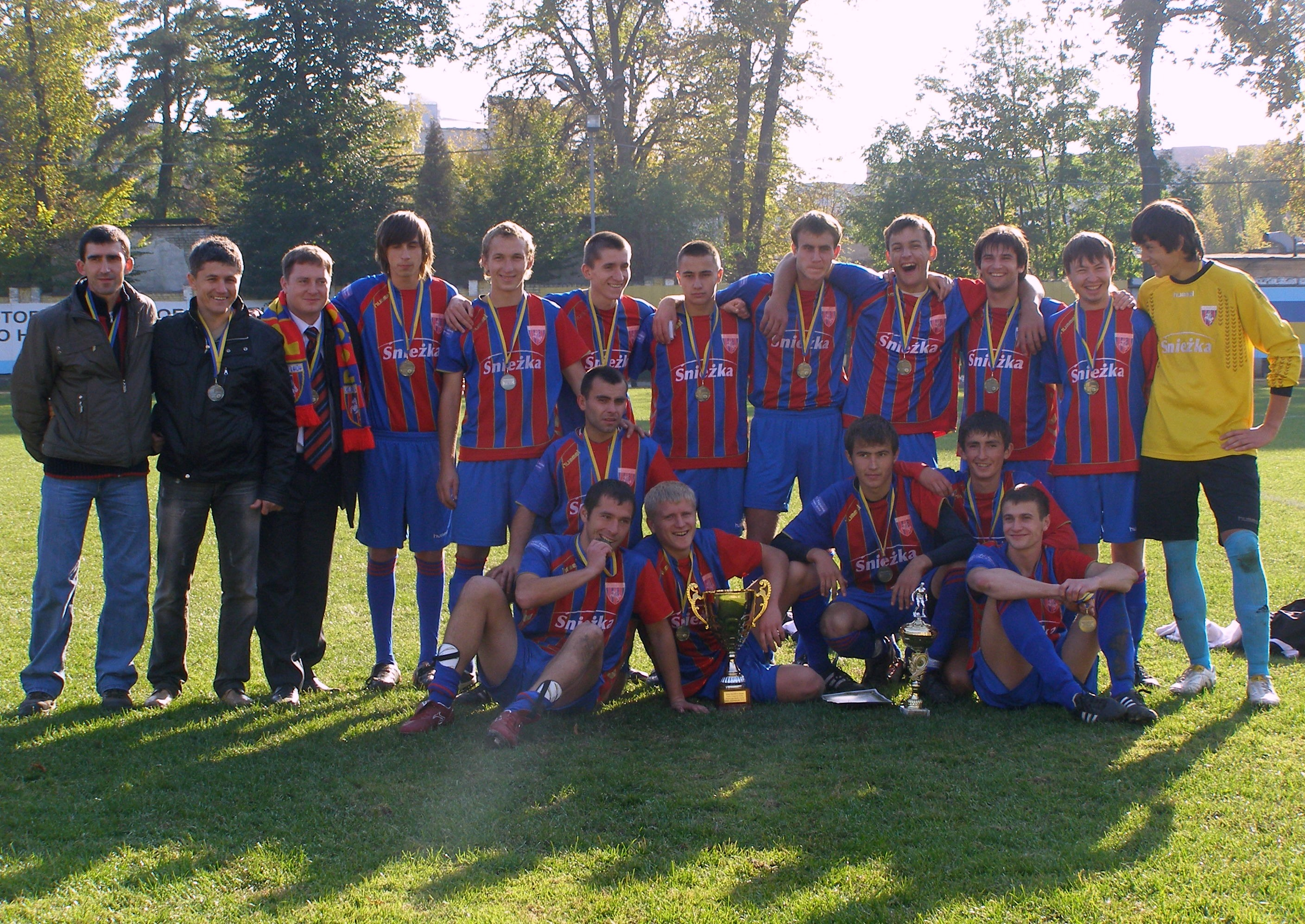
Pogoń Lwów in 2010

The original club was the second oldest Polish football club behind other teams from Lwów – Czarni and Lechia. With numerous departments, among them football, ice hockey and track and field, Pogoń was a major force of Polish sports in the interbellum period; its football team was never relegated from the elite Polish Football League. The club ceased to exist in September 1939, following German and Soviet aggression on Poland. On 2 July 1939 Pogoń played last pre-war official home game, drawing 1–1 with AKS Chorzów. The last pre-war game of the Pogoń's football team took place in Warsaw on 20 August 1939. Lwów's side lost 1–2 to Polonia Warszawa, scorer of the last goal was the 20-year-old forward Piotr Dreher.

=== Aftermath of the border shift ===
After the war, when it became clear that Lwów would no longer belong to Poland, its Polish citizens were forced to leave the city. Most of them settled in Lower Silesia and along the line of the Odra river. Pogoń's former officials as well as its players, who wanted to continue their sports activities, helped with founding of several sports clubs. Among clubs that can be regarded as Pogoń's continuation, there are: Polonia Bytom, Odra Opole, Piast Gliwice and Pogoń Szczecin. All these teams have the same hues as Pogon, and similar logos. Odra Opole was originally called Lwowianka, but the name was disliked by Communist authorities and had to be changed some time in late 1940s.

=== Foundation the new club ===
In April 2009, due to the initiative of young Polish inhabitants of Lviv, helped by Foundation Semper Polonia, Pogoń Lwów was established again. Led by coach Wladzimierz Mandziak, who had previously coached youth teams of Karpaty Lviv, Pogoń is an amateur side, whose players are Polish teenagers, mostly students of two Lviv’s elementary schools, where Polish language is taught. The team practises at the Dynamo stadium and its founders plan to re-open other departments of the famous organization. The initiative was very warmly welcomed in Poland on 29 April 2009; the players of Pogoń were introduced to a delegation of Polish parliamentarians, who promised help.

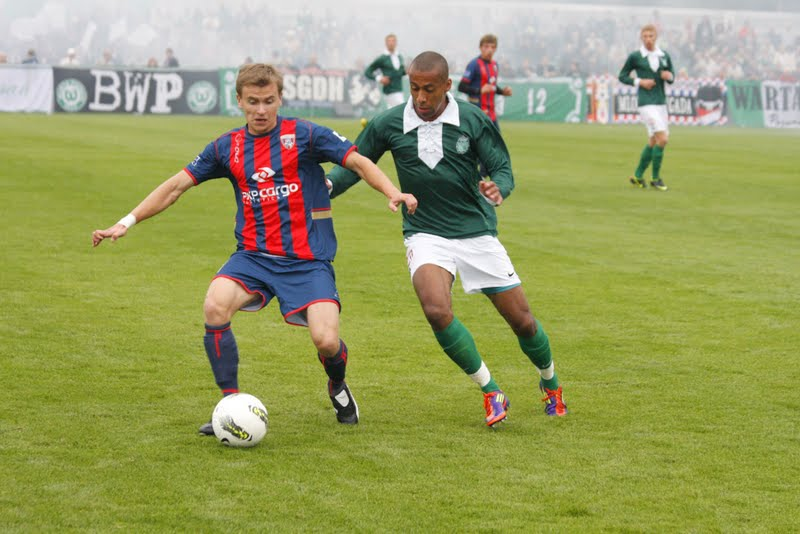
Warta Poznań v Pogoń Lwów in 2012 (friendly match)

On Saturday 10 October 2009, at 14:00 local time, the first official post-World War Two game of Pogoń Lwów took place. The newly recreated team faced another side of the Polish minority in Ukraine, the Polonia Khmelnitsky. The match, played at the Szkolar stadium (next to the Lychakiv Cemetery), ended with Lviv's side 2–0 victory, with both goals scored by Pawel Winiarski, graduate of the Lviv University. Before the game, an orchestra played anthems of Poland, Ukraine and the club. Among the viewers there were several supporters of Pogoń, wearing scarves with club's hues. There were also officials from Poland, including parliamentarians, and the delegations of two Polish clubs, Polonia Warszawa, and Polonia Bytom. Lviv's players put on the traditional jerseys, funded by the Sejm.

Together with the game the celebrations of Pogoń's recreation took place. The day began with a Roman Catholic Mass in Lviv's Cathedral. Then, at the Cemetery of the Defenders of Lwów, flowers were laid down on graves of pre-war players and officials of the club.

=== Playing history ===
The club initially established itself as a member of the Lviv Oblast Football Federation in the Lviv Oblast Premier League, with the view to one day become a fully professional team. In 2015 the club was struggling financially, leading to clubs and supporters from all over Poland donating money and scheduling fund-raising friendlies to help.

== Results ==
=== League ===
Season	League	Position	Of
2010	Lviv Oblast Second League Group B (Lviv City Championship)	1st	4
2010	Lviv Oblast Second League Group B (final)	2nd	2
2011	Lviv Oblast Vyshcha Liha	8th	10
2012	Lviv Oblast Premier League	7th	10
2013	Lviv Oblast Premier League	9th	12
2014	Lviv Oblast Premier League	10th	12
2015	Lviv Oblast Premier League	9th	10
2016	Lviv Oblast Premier League	6th	12
2017	Lviv Oblast Premier League	6th	14
2018	Lviv Oblast Premier League	9th	13
2019	Lviv Oblast Premier League	5th	12
2020	Lviv Oblast Premier League (group stage sup-group A)	5th	6
2021	Lviv Oblast Premier League	9th	13

=== Regional cups ===
Season	Cup	Result
2014	Lviv Oblast Cup	Round of 32
2018	Lviv Oblast Cup	Round of 16
2020	Lviv Oblast Cup	First round
2021	Lviv Oblast Cup	Quarter-final

== Honours ==
- Lviv City Championship
  - Champions: 2010
- Lviv Oblast Second League
  - Runners-up: 2010
