= UAF Regions' Cup =

- Founded: 2015
- Region: Ukraine
- Qualifier for: UEFA Regions' Cup
- Current champions: Ivano-Frankivsk Oblast
- Most championships: 3 (tied at 1)
- 2022 UAF Regions' Cup

The UAF Regions' Cup (Ukrainian: Кубок регіонів УАФ) is a national cup competition in Ukraine for amateur teams of all regions. Before 2021, it was known as the FFU Regions' Cup. The competition was first played in the 2015 season and the winner receives the right to progress to the UEFA Regions' Cup which serves as similar continental competition.

Before 2015 to the UEFA Regions' Cup were qualifying better Ukrainian amateur clubs of the Ukrainian Football Amateur Association and usually that had won the Ukrainian Amateur Football Championship. In 2015 the Football Federation of Ukraine organized a specific tournament for regions' representative football teams. The new tournament is not part of the national football amateur association (AAFU).

== Finals ==
Year	Teams	Final's venue	Winner	Final's Score	Runner-up
2015–16	25	Kolos Stadium, Boryspil	Kirovohrad	2 – 0	Lviv
2018	26	Bannikov Stadium, Kyiv	Lviv	2 – 1	Sumy
2020	Never openly announced, presumed scratched				
2022	10	Bannikov Stadium, Kyiv	Ivano-Frankivsk	3 – 2 (a.e.t.)	Lviv

== Performance by team ==
Club	Winners	Runner-up	Winning years
(Lviv Oblast) Lviv	1	2	2018
Kirovohrad Oblast	1	0	2015–16
Ivano-Frankivsk Oblast	1	0	2022
Sumy Oblast	0	1	

== UEFA Regions' Cup ==
=== Previous teams ===
- 1999 – UFEI Kyiv (Ukrainian Finance-Economics Institute)
- 2001 – Dnister Ovidiopol (1999 Champion)
- 2003 – Pivdenstal Yenakiive (2001 Cup holder)
- 2005 – KZEZO Kakhovka (2004 Champion), known as Kakhovka-Kzeso (the Russian-like spelling of Kzeso)
- 2007 – Ivan Odesa (2005 Champion)
- 2009 – Bastion Illichivsk (2007 Champion), was in fact Bastion-2 Illichivsk as the first team was playing at professional level
- 2011 – Yednist-2 Plysky (2009 Champion), the first team FC Yednist Plysky at that time played at professional level
- 2013 – Nove Zhyttia - Putrivka (2011 Champion), a united team of both finalists that represent two different regions
- 2015 – AF-Pyatykhatska Volodymyrivka (2014 Cup holder)

=== FFU Regions' Cup winners ===
- 2017 – Kirovohrad Oblast (Inhulets)
- 2019 – Lviv Oblast
- 2021 – scratched
- 2023 – Ivano-Frankivsk Oblast

=== Regions in Europe ===
Team	Tourneys	Clubs, teams
Odesa Oblast	3	Dnister Ovidiopol, Ivan Odesa, Bastion Illichivsk
Kirovohrad Oblast	2	Inhulets Petrove (AF-Piatykhatska)
Kyiv Oblast	2*	Ukraine amateur team, Nove-Zhyttia/Putrivka
Donetsk Oblast	1	Pivdenstal Yenakieve
Kherson Oblast	1	Kakhovka-Kzeso
Chernihiv Oblast	1	Yednist Plysky
Poltava Oblast	1*	Nove-Zhyttia/Putrivka
Lviv Oblast	1	Amateur team
Ivano-Frankivsk Oblast	1	Amateur team

* – shared representation

== See also ==
- Ukrainian football championship among amateurs
