= Karol Miklosz =

Polish-Soviet footballer, Soviet referee and Soviet-Ukrainian football administrator

Personal information
- Full name: Karlo Vladyslavovych Miklyosh
- Date of birth: 21 June 1915
- Place of birth: Lemberg, Galicia, Austro-Hungary
- Date of death: 31 May 2003 (aged 87)
- Place of death: Lviv, Ukraine
- Position: Inside forward

Senior career*
Years	Team	Apps	(Gls)
1932–1939	Ukraina Lwów		
1939–1940	World War II		
1941	Oblspozhyvspilka Lviv		
1941–1944	Ukraina Lwów		
1944–1945	Dynamo Lviv		
1946–1947	Spartak Lviv		
?	Lokomotyv Lviv		
- * Club domestic league appearances and goals

Karol Miklosz (Ukrainian: Карло Владиславович Мікльош, 1915–2003) was a Polish-Soviet footballer, Soviet referee and Soviet-Ukrainian football administrator. Most of his career was spent playing for Ukraina Lwów and he later became president of FC Karpaty Lviv.

In 1938, he won the President of Poland's Football Cup with Ukraina Lwów, where he began his career and where he played till the Soviet Union invasion of Poland in 1939. After that, he played on Soviet teams till he retired as a player in 1947 and began a career as a referee. In 1945, Miklosz became a champion of the republican Dynamo Society (Dynamo Society of Ukraine).

From 1955 through 1968, Miklosz headed the Football Federation of Lviv Region. He was a director of FC Karpaty Lviv in 1968–1972, and a president of the club in 1990–1992.

Sporting positions
Preceded by Gleb Klimov	President of the Lviv Oblast Football Federation; 1955–1959	Succeeded by Yevgeniy Preobrazhenskiy
Preceded by Yevgeniy Preobrazhenskiy	President of the Lviv Oblast Football Federation; 1960–1968	Succeeded by Boris Goncharov
Preceded by Yulian Kordiak	President of the FC Karpaty Lviv; 1990–1992	Succeeded by Bohdan Kobryn
