= Lviv Association of Football =

Ukrainian Regional Football Association

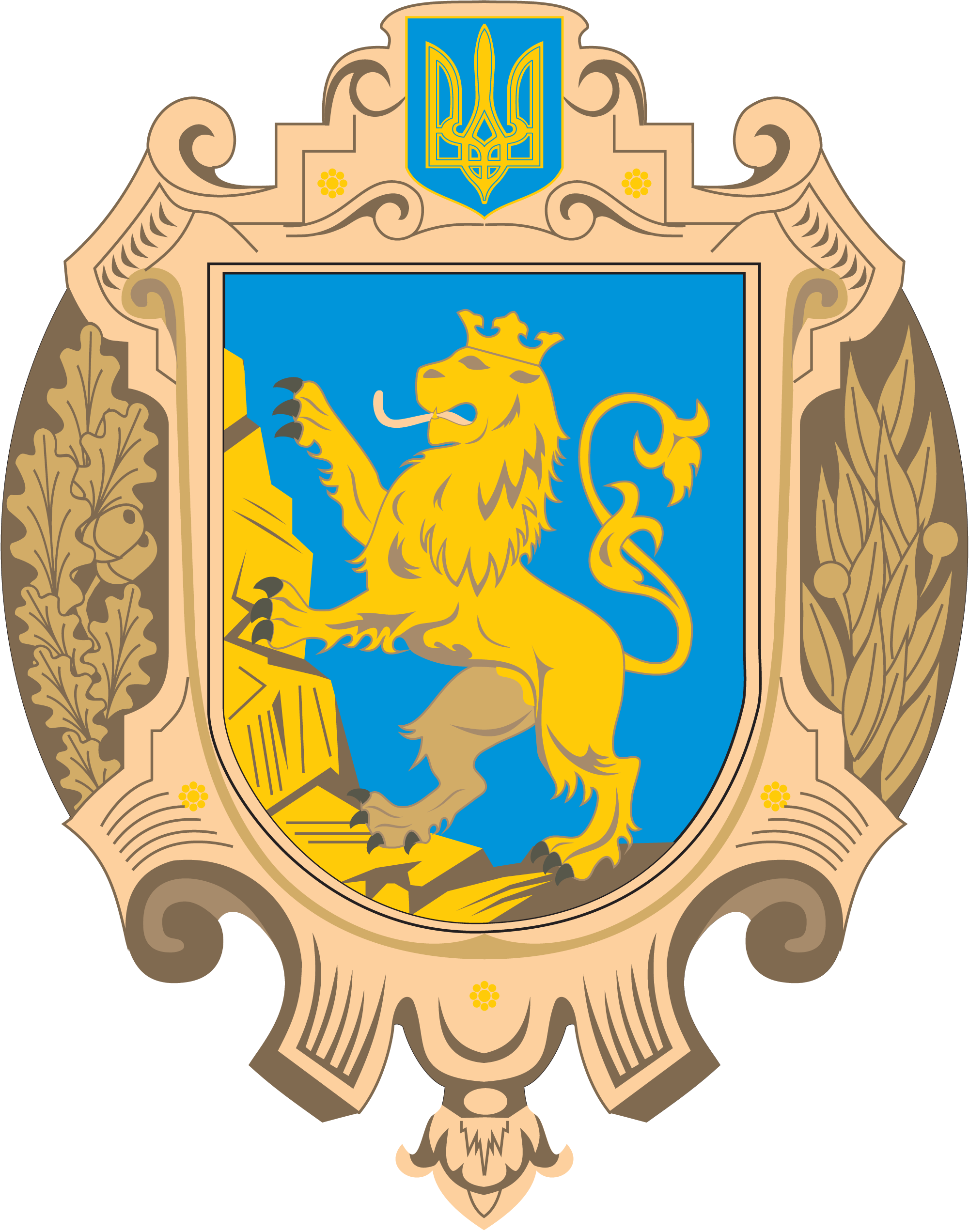

The Lviv Association of Football (LAF) (formerly Lviv Oblast Football Federation (LOFF)) is a football governing body in the region of Lviv Oblast, Ukraine. The federation is a member of the Regional Council of FFU and the collective member of the FFU itself.

== History ==
The Ukrainian sports movement arose in West Ukraine / East Galicia just before the World War I on initiative of professor Ivan Bobersky around 1906. After the war in the recovered Poland, those competitions were conducted under auspices of the Ukrainian Sports Union (Ukrajinskyj Sojuz Sportowyj). However those competitions were not popular and many leading Ukrainian football clubs such as Ukraina Lwow eventually joined the official Polish competitions.

The well organized and publicized Ukrainian football competitions in the region started during World War II as Soviet football competitions in 1940 when the West Ukraine was occupied by the Soviet Red Army (RKKA). All of the original football clubs were dissolved and in their place were created generic Soviet clubs ("proletarian" background) such as Dynamo, Spartak, DO (Dom Ofitserov), and others. During the Nazi occupation in 1941-1944, there was conducted the championship of Halychyna among Ukrainian squads in 1942-44.

After the war, the Soviet football championship of Lviv Oblast within the Soviet Ukraine was reinstated. With fall of the Soviet Union in 1989-91, the competitions phased over as part of independent Ukraine.

== Presidents ==
- 1946–1955 Hlib Klymov
- 1955–1959 Karol Miklosz
- 1959–1960 Yevhen Preobrazhenskyi
- 1960–1968 Karol Miklosz
- ????–???? Borys Honcharov
- ????–???? Volodymyr Biletskyi
- ????–???? Mykola Pecherskyi
- ????–???? Vasyl Solomonko
- ????–???? Mykhailo Kusen
- 1989–1992 Ivan Salo
- 1992–1997 Mykhailo Kusen
- 1997–2017 Yaroslav Hrysyo
- 2017–present Oleksandr Shevchenko

== Previous champions ==
- 1940 Dynamo Lviv
- 1941-1944 World War II
- 1945 Dynamo Lviv (2)
- 1946-1947 no competitions
- 1948 Spartak Yavoriv
- 1949 Kharchovyk Vynnyky
- 1950 DOK Lviv (res)
- 1951 Kolhospnyk Bibrka
- 1952 Iskra Zolochiv
- 1953 Dynamo Lviv (3)
- 1954 Kolhospnyk Bibrka (2)
- 1955 Burevisnyk Zolochiv
- 1956 Burevisnyk Zolochiv (2)
- 1957 ???
- 1958 Avanhard Nesteriv
- 1959 Spartak Drohobych
- 1960 Avanhard Vynnyky
- 1961 Silmash Lviv
- 1962 Silmash Lviv (2)
- 1963 LVVPU Lviv
- 1964 ???
- 1965 Khimik Novyi Rozdil
- 1966 Sokil Lviv
- 1967 Shakhtar Chervonohrad
- 1968 Khimik Novyi Rozdil (2)
- 1969 Khimik Novyi Rozdil (3)
- 1970 Sokil Lviv (2)
- 1971 Sokil Lviv (3)
- 1972 Avanhard Stryi
- 1973 Sokil Lviv (4)
- 1974 SKA Lviv (2)
- 1975 SKA Lviv (3)
- 1976 SKA Lviv (4)
- 1977 Shakhtar Chervonohrad (2)
- 1978 ???
- 1979 Shakhtar Chervonohrad (3)
- 1980 Khimik Drohobych
- 1981 Khimik Drohobych (2)
- 1982 Spartak Sambir
- 1983 Tsementnyk Mykolaiv
- 1984 Spartak Sambir (2)
- 1985 Spartak Sambir (3)
- 1986 Tsementnyk Mykolaiv (2)
- 1987 Avanhard Zhydachiv
- 1988 Spartak Sambir (4)
- 1989 Karpaty Kamianka-Buzka
- 1990 Hazovyk Komarno
- 1991 Hirnyk Novoyavorivske
- =independence of Ukraine=
- 1992sp Tsementnyk Mykolaiv (3)
- 1993 Karpaty Kamianka-Buzka/FC Lviv
- 1994 Haray Zhovkva/Haray Zhovkva
- 1995 Yavir Yavoriv/Yavir Yavoriv
- 1996 Yavir Yavoriv (2)/Yavir Yavoriv
- 1997 Yavir Yavoriv (3)/Yavir Yavoriv
- 1998 Yavir Yavoriv (4)/Yavir Yavoriv
- 1999 SC Truskavets
- 1999fl Naftovyk Boryslav
- 2000 Rochyn Sosnivka
- 2001 Rochyn Sosnivka (2)
- 2002 Rava Rava-Ruska
- 2003 Rava-2 Rava Ruska (2)
- 2004 Karpaty Truskavets
- 2005 Karpaty Kamianka-Buzka (2)
- 2006 Shakhtar Chervonohrad (4)
- 2007 Rava Rava-Ruska (3)
- 2008 Rava Rava-Ruska (4)
- 2009 Karpaty Kamianka-Buzka (3)
- 2010 Naftusia Skhidnytsia
- 2011 FC Kulykiv
- 2012 Rukh Vynnyky
- 2013 Rukh Vynnyky (2)
- =Russo-Ukrainian War=
- 2014 Rukh Vynnyky (3)
- 2015 Rukh Vynnyky (4)
- 2016 SCC Demnya
- 2017 FC Mykolaiv (4)
- 2018 Yunist Verkhnya Bilka
- 2019 Yunist Verkhnya Bilka (2)
- 2020 Yunist Verkhnya Bilka (3)
- 2021 Yunist Verkhnya Bilka (4)
- =full-scale Russian invasion=
- 2022 Yunist Verkhnya Bilka (5)
- 2023 Yunist Verkhnya Bilka (6)
- 2024 FC Mykolaiv (5)

Note:

- In 1993–99 the championship was organized by fall-spring calendar. In 1999 the main competition was shifted back to the summer calendar. Therefore, there are two champions in 1999.
- In 1992 Tsementnyk became a champion including performance records of first and youth reserve teams, so called "combined record".
- In 1993–1998 there existed playoffs for "absolute champion" between champions of oblast and city. In the table the "absolute" champion is placed second after the oblast champion.

=== Winners ===
- 6 - Yunist Verkhnya Bilka/Kulykiv
- 5 - FC Mykolaiv
- 4 - 6 clubs (Sokil, SKA, Spartak S., Yavir, Shakhtar Ch., Rava, Rukh)
- 3 - 3 clubs (Dynamo, Khimik N.R., Karpaty K.B.)
- 2 - 5 clubs (Kolhospnyk, Burevisnyk, Silmash, Khimik Dr., Rochyn)
- 1 - 19 clubs

== Football championship of Drohobych Oblast ==
In 1945–1958 there was conducted separate football championship in Drohobych Oblast which later was merged with Lviv Oblast.

== Football championship of Halychyna ==
The competitions were conducted during the occupation by the Nazi Germany within the General Government in 1942-1944 under auspices of the Ukrainian Central Committee from Kraków. The competitions were officially known as the Professor Volodymyr Kubiyovych Cup.

- 1942 – Ukraina Lwow
- 1943 – Skala Stryi
- 1944 – Vatra Drohobych (season unfinished)

== Professional clubs ==
- FC Spartak Lviv, 1947-1949 (3 seasons)
- SKA Lviv (ODO, SKVO, SC Lutsk, SKA Karpaty), 1949, 1954-1989 (37 seasons)
- FC Karpaty Lviv, 1963-1981, 1989-2021 (51 seasons)
  - Karpaty-2 (FC Lviv (1992) 1993-2001), 1993-2010 (18 seasons)
  - Karpaty-3 (Karpaty-2, Karpaty-Halychyna), 1997-2004 (8 seasons)
- FC Neftianik Drohobych, 1960-1970 (11 seasons)
- FC Shakhter Chervonohrad, 1968-1970 (3 seasons)
- FC Halychyna Drohobych, 1990-2003 (14 seasons)
- FC Skala Stryi (Karpaty Kamianka-Buzka), 1991-1996, 2023– (8 seasons)

- FC Sambir (Promin Volia Baranetska), 1992-1994 (3 seasons)
- FC Avanhard Zhydachiv, 1992-1996 (5 seasons)
- FC Lviv (FC Hazovyk Komarne 1992-2001, Hazovyk-Skala Stryi 2001-2006), 1992-2012, 2017-2023 (27 seasons)
  - Lviv-2, 2009-2010 (a season)
- FC Medyk Morshyn, 1993-1994 (a season)
- SC Skify Lviv, 1994-1996 (2 seasons)
- FC Haray Zhovkva, 1995-1999 (4 seasons)
- FC Tsementnyk-Khorda Mykolaiv, 1997-2002 (5 seasons)
- FC Dynamo Lviv, 1999-2002 (3 seasons)
- FC Sokil Zolochiv, 2000-2002 (2 seasons)
- FC SKA-Orbita Lviv, 2001-2002 (a season)
- FC Rava Rava-Ruska, 2003-2006 (3 seasons)
- FC Skala Stryi (2004) (until 2011 represented Morshyn, FC Morshyn, Skala Morshyn), 2009-2018 (9 seasons)
- FC Rukh Lviv (until 2019 represented Vynnyky), 2016- (9 seasons)
  - Rukh-2, 2023- (2 seasons)
- FC Karpaty Lviv, 2021- (4 seasons)
  - Karpaty-2, 2023–2024 (a season)
- FC Kulykiv, 2024- (a season)

== Other clubs at national/republican level ==
Note: the list includes clubs that played at republican competitions before 1959 and the amateur or KFK competitions after 1964..

- Spartak Drohobych, 1946, 1948
- Spartak Lviv, 1946
- Dynamo Lviv, 1947, 1949, 1953, 1956, 1998/99
- Bilshovyk Sambir, 1947–1949
- DO Stryi, 1948
- Naftovyk Boryslav, 1948–1950, 1952, 2000
- Bilshovyk Zolochiv, 1948, 1949
- Bilshovyk Vynnyky, 1949
- Naftovyk Stryi, 1949
- Dynamo Drohobych, 1949
- SKA Lviv (DO), 1950–1952, 1973 – 1976
- Kharchovyk Vynnyky, 1951, 1952
- Naftovyk Drohobych, 1951, 1953–1956, 1958, 1959
- Kolhospnyk Stryi, 1951
- Trud Lviv, 1954
- Torpedo Lviv, 1955
- Avanhard Lviv, 1958, 1959
- LVVPU Lviv, 1964, 1965, 1969, 1971, 1972, 1977 – 1979, 1985, 1986
- Khimik Novyi Rozdil, 1966, 1977, 1978
- Vymiriuvach Lviv, 1967
- Avanhard Boryslav, 1968
- Sokil Lviv, 1970 – 1982, 1992/93 – 1994/95
- Tsementnyk Mykolaiv, 1970, 1971, 1973, 1974, 1980, 1984, 1987, 1996/97, 2024/25
- Skala 1911 Stryi (Avanhard), 1971 – 1973, 2022/23
- Dolotnyk Drohobych, 1972
- Torpedo Drohobych, 1973
- Kolos Khodoriv, 1975
- Shakhtar Chervonohrad, 1977 – 1980, 1982, 1990, 1992/93 – 1994/95
- Khimik Drohobych, 1979 – 1981
- Khimik Sokal, 1981
- Zoria Kernytsia, 1981
- Spartak Sambir, 1983, 1985, 1986, 1989 – 1991
- Avtomobilist Lviv, 1983, 1984, 1988, 1989
- Kolos Zastavne, 1986, 1987
- Zirka Lviv, 1987
- Avanhard Drohobych, 1988
- Avanhard Zhydachiv, 1988, 1989
- Karpaty Kamianka-Buzka, 1989, 1990
- Hirnyk Novoyavorivsk, 1990, 1992/93 – 1994/95
- Hazovyk Komarno, 1991
- Promin Sambir, 1991, 1994/95, 1996/97, 1997/98, 2011
- LAZ Lviv, 1993/94
- Medyk Morshyn, 1994/95, 1996/97
- Haray Zhovkva, 1994/95
- Yavir Yavoriv, 1995/96
- SKA-Orbita Lviv, 2001
- Rava Rava-Ruska, 2003
- Rozdillia Novyi Rozdil, 2004
- Sokil Sukhovolia, 2006
- Halychyna Lviv, 2007
- Sokil Zolochiv, 2008
- FC Morshyn, 2009
- Rukh Vynnyky, 2013 – 2015
- Opir Lviv, 2015
- Rochyn Sosnivka, 2016 – 2018/19
- FC Lviv, 2016/17
- Karpaty Lviv, 2020/21
- Yunist Verkhnia Bilka, 2020/21, 2021/22
- Feniks Pidmonastyr, 2021/22–2024/25
- FC Kulykiv, 2022/23, 2023/24

== Lviv derby ==
=== Soviet period ===
The first meeting between two Lviv city teams of Lviv Association of Football took place in 1949 between Spartak and ODO (SKA). During the Soviet period those teams met only twice and all in one season. Later however more lasting derby existed between SKA and Karpaty that also played at tier 2.

The Soviet Lviv derby started in 1949 when as part of the Soviet Vtoraya Gruppa (second tier) in its Ukrainian Zone met Spartak Lviv and DO Lviv both games were won by Spartak 2:1 and 3:1 (home and away respectfully).

It was the first face off of two Lviv teams after the earlier Polish Lwow derby between Pogon and Czarni that existed since establishment of Ekstraklasa in 1927–1933 (seven seasons). Until the establishment of Karpaty in 1960s, it was the only meeting between Soviet teams of masters from Lviv. In 1950 due to reorganization of the Soviet football competitions Spartak Lviv was merged with the local Dynamo Lviv, while SKA (or DO) competed at republican level.

In 1960s the Lviv derby was revived as part of the Soviet Class A Vtoraya Gruppa (second tier) between now SKA Lviv and Karpaty Lviv (sponsored by Lviv Electronic Factory "Elektron"). The derby lasted only for four seasons SKA – Karpaty 3:0,2:0 (1965)*, 1:0 0:1 (1966), 1:2 0:0 (1967), 1:5 1:4 (1968), 1:1 1:2 (1969). That was it for the Soviet period of Lviv city football derbies.

In 1981 both teams were merged as SKA-Karpaty which existed until 1989 and was dissolved. After that in Lviv were reinstated FC Karpaty, while players the Army team which was abandoned were transferred to Drohobych where there was reviving Naftovyk Drohobych, but instead was established FC Halychyna Drohobych.

=== Ukrainian period ===
- Karpaty – Lviv 2:1 4:2 (2008–09), 0:1 1:1 (2018–19), 0:0 0:0 1:1 1:1 (2019–20) +2=5-1
- Lviv – Rukh 1:1 0:0 (2020–21), 0:1 (2021–22), 2:1 0:2 (2022–23) +1=2-2
- Rukh – Karpaty (2024–25)

- Karpaty-2/3 Lviv – Dynamo Lviv 3:1 1:0 (1999–2000), 0:1 0:3 (2000–01), 0:1 1:0 (2001–02) +3=0-3
- Karpaty-3 Lviv – SKA-Orbita Lviv 0:0 1:1 (2001–02)
- Dynamo Lviv – SKA-Orbita Lviv 0:0 4:0 (2001–02)
- Karpaty-2 Lviv – FC Lviv-2 2:0 1:3 (2009–10)

== See also ==
- Lviv Oblast football team
- FFU Council of Regions
