= Suleyman Seytkhalilov =

Ukrainian footballer

Personal information
- Full name: Suleyman Fakhriyovych Seytkhalilov
- Date of birth: 14 February 2002 (age 24)
- Place of birth: Yevpatoria, AR Crimea, Ukraine
- Height: 1.78 m (5 ft 10 in)
- Position: Midfielder

Team information
- Current team: Metalurh Zaporizhzhia
- Number: 97

Youth career
- 2014–2016: Dnipro Dnipropetrovsk
- 2016–2017: Knyazha Shchaslyve
- 2017–2019: Zirka Kropyvnytskyi

Senior career*
Years	Team	Apps	(Gls)
2019–2020	Zirka Kropyvnytskyi	14	(2)
2020–2022	Inhulets Petrove	1	(0)
2021–2022	→ Kremin Kremenchuk (loan)	14	(0)
2022	Hirnyk-Sport Horishni Plavni	11	(1)
2023–2024	Metalurh Zaporizhzhia	25	(1)
2024	Dinaz Vyshhorod	21	(1)
2025–2026	Viktoriya Sumy	20	(1)
2026	Metalurh Zaporizhzhia	7	(2)
2026-	SC Poltava	12	(2)
- * Club domestic league appearances and goals as of 31/10/26 @ 13:55(AEST)

Suleyman Fakhriyovych Seytkhalilov (Ukrainian: Сулейман Фахрійович Сейтхалілов; born 14 February 2002) is a Ukrainian professional footballer who plays as a midfielder for Ukrainian First League club Metalurh Zaporizhzhia.

== Career ==
Born in Crimea, Seytkhalilov is a product of the Dnipro, Knyazha and Zirka youth sportive school systems.

Seytkhalilov played for Zirka Kropyvnytskyi in Kirovohrad Oblast championship and in 2019–20 Ukrainian Football Amateur League.

In August 2020 he was transferred to the Premier League debutante FC Inhulets Petrove and made his debut in the Ukrainian Premier League on 21 February 2021, playing as the second half-time substituted player in a home drawing match against FC Vorskla Poltava. He played for Inhulets U19 team for two years in Ukrainian Premier League Under-21 and Under-19, featuring in 20 matches and scoring 1 goal.

Seytkhalilov joined Ukrainian First League club Kremin Kremenchuk during August 2021 on a half season-long loan. He took shirt number 97. Seytkhalilov made 14 appearances in all competitions for Kremin, assisting 2 times, before returning to Inhulets in July 2022.

He moved to Ukrainian First League Hirnyk-Sport Horishni Plavni in 2022 making 11 appearances, scoring 1 goal in a win against Skoruk Tomakivka. On 7 February 2023 Seytkhalilov joined another Ukrainian First League club Metalurh Zaporizhzhia.
