= Yunist Stadium (Volochysk) =

Stadium in Ukraine

- Yunist
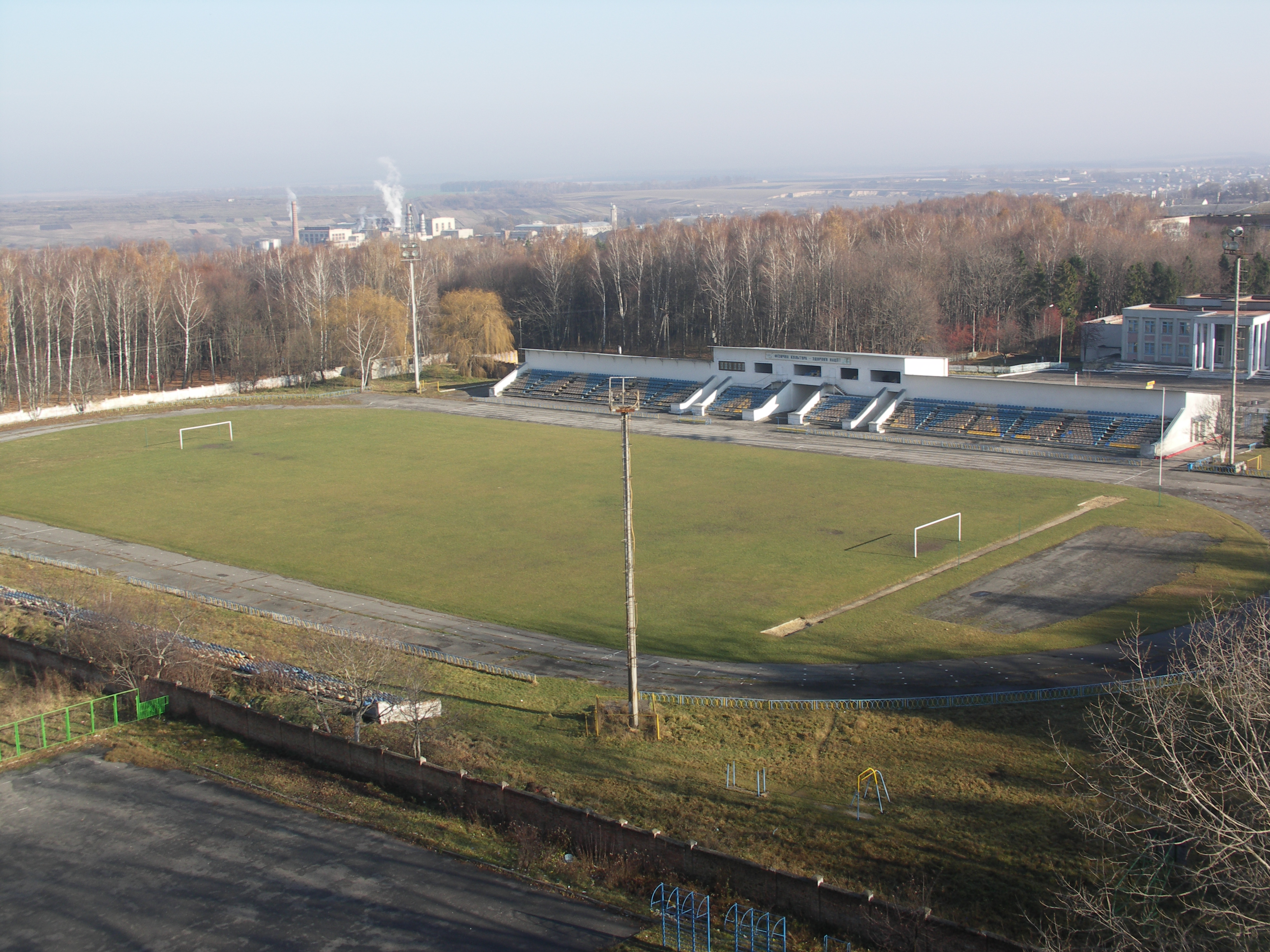
- Interactive map of Yunist Stadium
- Location: Volochysk, Ukraine
- Coordinates: 49°54′00″N 26°21′00″E
- Capacity: 2,700
- Surface: Grass
- Field size: 105 m × 74 m (344 ft × 243 ft)

Construction
- Groundbreaking: 1980
- Opened: 1980
- Renovated: 2018

Tenant
- FC Ahrobiznes Volochysk

Yunist Stadium is a football stadium in Volochysk, Ukraine. It is the main stadium of the city of Volochysk, Khmelnytskyi Oblast. Since 2016, the stadium has become the home arena of the football club Ahrobiznes Volochysk.

The stadium was put into operation in 1980. The stadium's capacity at that time was 3,500 seats. After the reconstruction, during which plastic seats were installed in the central sectors of the stadium, the number of spectator seats decreased to 2,700.
