= 2017–18 Ukrainian Women's Cup =

Tournament details
- Country: Ukraine
- Dates: 25 April 2017 – 2 June 2018
- Teams: 12

Final positions
- Champions: Zhytlobud-1 Kharkiv
- Runners-up: Lehenda-ShVSM Chernihiv

The 2017–18 Ukrainian Women's Cup was the 25th season of Ukrainian knockout competitions among women teams.

== Competition schedule ==
=== Round of 16 ===
25 April 2017	Yantarochka Novoyavorivsk (II)	0–3	(I) Rodyna-Litsei Kostopil	Novoyavorivsk
13:00		Report	Alina Starukhina 16'; Alina Hodunko 46'; Maria Kuleba (Koleshchuk) 55' (pen.)	Stadium: im. O.Rusyna; Attendance: 150; Referee: Maria Sas (Chernvitsi)

25 April 2017	Mariupolchanka Mariupol (II)	2–1	(I) Pantery Uman	Mariupol
14:00	Yana Vynokurova 63' (pen.); Svitlana Frishko 81'	Report	Iryna Podkuiko (penalty missed) 32'; Oksana Bilokur 78'	Stadium: Azovets; Attendance: 100; Referee: Kateryna Usova (Kyiv Oblast)

25 April 2017	Kolos-Mriya Makhnivka (II)	+/- (TR)	(I) Zlahoda Dnipro	Makhnivka, Vinnytsia Oblast
		Report		Stadium: Kolos; Attendance: 0

25 April 2017	Voskhod Stara Mayachka (II)	0–10	(I) Zhytlobud-2 Kharkiv	Kherson
12:00	Kristina Ivashchenko 72' (o.g.)	Report	Anastasia Skorynina 14'; Tetiana Tril (Polyukhovych) 25', 61'; Violetta Tian 35'; Tetiana Kitayeva 52', 55'; Anastasia Kumeda 57', 58'; Lyubov Mokhnach 65'	Stadium: DYuSSh Osvita; Attendance: 50; Referee: Kristina Kozoroh (Kyiv Oblast)

=== Quarterfinals ===
Lehenda Chernihiv, Yatran Berestivets, Zhytlobud-1 Kharkiv and Luhanochka received bye.

2 May 2018	Rodyna-Litsei Kostopil (I)	0–2	(I) Lehenda Chernihiv	Kostopil
15:00		Report	Olena Lymar 49'; Nadia Kunina 90'	Stadium: Kolos; Attendance: 50; Referee: Sofia Prychyna (Lviv Oblast)

2 May 2018	Luhanochka (II)	0–21	(I) Zhytlobud-2 Kharkiv	Kharkiv
13:00	Oleksandra Rechkina 68' (o.g.)	Report	Vira Dyatel 3', 4', 22', 24', 42'; Yana Kalinina 12'; Tetiana Tril (Polyukhovych) 17'; Anastasia Skorynina 17', 18', 23', 28', 51', 56'; Tetiana Kitayeva 29', 65'; Veronika Andrukhiv 72', 90+1'; Viktoria Holovach 79'; Iryna Vasylyuk 82'; Anastasia Kumeda 84'	Stadium: Solnechnyi; Attendance: 30

2 May 2018	Kolos-Mriya Makhnivka (II)	0–18	(I) Zhytlobud-1 Kharkiv	Kharkiv
11:00		Report	Olha Ovdiychuk 3', 11', 29'; Hanna Mozolska 8', 27', 32', 68'; Iryna Kochnyeva 14', 71'; Yulia Shevchuk 18', 20', 24', 44'; Yana Nadiezhdina (Holysh) 39'; Taisia Nesterenko 46', 73'; Iryna Sanina (Katayeva) 72', 90'	Stadium: KhNUVS Dynamo Arena; Attendance: 100; Referee: Veronika Vasylchenko (Tahamlyk) (Sloviansk)

2 May 2018	Mariupolchanka Mariupol (II)	0–4	(I) Yatran Berestivets	Mariupol
12:00		Report	Anastasia Voronina 14'; Natalia Ailinkiy 28', 45+1'; Roksolana Komar 71'	Stadium: Azovets; Attendance: 62; Referee: Kateryna Zora (Kyiv)

=== Semifinals ===
9 May 2018	Lehenda Chernihiv (I)	2–2 (a.e.t.) (4–2 p)	(I) Yatran Berestivets	Chernihiv
14:00	Natia Pantsulaya 70'; Polina Polukhina (red card) 110'; Olena Lymar 117'	Report	Tetiana Levytska 30'; Roksolana Komar 95'; Anastasia Nazarenko (red card) 110'	Stadium: Chernihiv Arena; Attendance: 200; Referee: Inna Vakulko (Rivne Oblast)

9 May 2018	Zhytlobud-1 Kharkiv (I)	2–1	(I) Zhytlobud-2 Kharkiv	Kharkiv
18:00	Olha Ovdiychuk 27'; Hanna Voronina 87'	Report	Yana Kalinina 21'	Stadium: KhNUVD Dynamo Arena; Attendance: 520; Referee: Kateryna Monzul (Kharkiv)

=== Final ===
2 June 2018	Lehenda Chernihiv (I)	0–8	(I) Zhytlobud-1 Kharkiv	Ternopil
18:00		Report	Olha Ovdiychuk 18', 25', 48'; Yelizaveta Kostyuchenko 36', 45'; Hanna Voronina 56', 69'; Darya Apanashchenko 87'	Stadium: Miskyi; Attendance: 1,560; Referee: Anastasia Romanyuk (Ivano-Frankivsk)

== See also ==
- 2017–18 Vyshcha Liha (women)
- 2017–18 Ukrainian Cup
