= Skif Stadium =

Sports venue in Lviv, Ukraine

Skif Stadion
- Стадіон «Скіф»
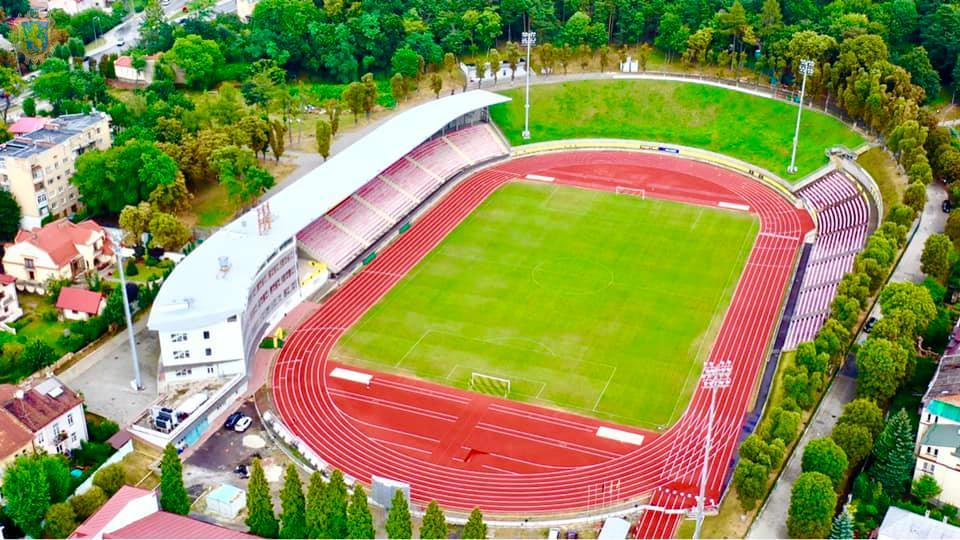
- Interactive map of Skif Stadion
- Location: vul. Cheremshyny, 17, Lviv, Ukraine
- Coordinates: 49.8348229°N 24.0607178°E
- Owner: Lviv State University of Physical Culture
- Operator: FC Rukh Lviv
- Capacity: 3742
- Type: multi-purpose stadium
- Surface: Grass
- Field size: 105x68 m

Construction
- Built: 1897
- Renovated: 2011 (latest)

Tenants
- Lechia Lwów FC Lviv Lviv Oblast Rukh Lviv: 1930s 2017–2018; 2015–present 2019–2020

The sports complex of the Lviv State University of Physical Culture «Skif» (Ukrainian: Комплексно-спортивна база Львівського державного університету фізичної культури «Скіф») or simply Skif Stadium is a sports base with multi-purpose stadium in Lviv, Ukraine. It is the home field for Rukh Lviv.

== History ==
=== Sokół ===
Built in 1897 by Ivan Levynskyi and Edgar Kovats in Zakopane Style, originally the stadium and other sports facilities around it belonged to the Polish Sokół sports society. The stadium was situated next to the Lychakiv Park. It was of standard size with running tracks all around it, stands for about 3,000 spectators, indoor equestrian facility, halls to perform gymnastic exercises and fencing competitions. On the project of Levynskyi there was built an administrative building. The complex was among the best in Austria-Hungary and later Poland.

=== Skif ===
Before 1946 the stadium belonged to the Soviet Spartak society (see FC Spartak Lviv). In 1946 in Lviv was established the Lviv sports institute, the stadium was passed to it.

In 2011 the stadium was renovated in preparation to the Euro 2012 as a possible training grounds. During the renovations, there was built a four-storey building for general purpose which houses, medical office, conference hall for 100 people, space of athletes, coaches, referees as well as students classrooms.
