= Lviv Oblast football team =

Ukrainian oblast football team

Lviv Oblast
- Association: Football Federation of Ukraine
- Other affiliation: Lviv Oblast Football Federation
- Head coach: Vitaliy Ponomaryov
- Top scorer: 2 – Rostyslav Mykhalchuk
- Home stadium: Skif Stadium

First international
- (Volyn Oblast) Volyn 0–2 Lviv (Lviv Oblast) (Lutsk; 20 September 2015)

Biggest win
- (Lviv Oblast) Lviv 4–0 Rivne (Rivne Oblast) (Lviv; 11 October 2015) (Lviv Oblast) Lviv 4–0 Uğur FK (Azerbaijan) (Lviv; 2 October 2018)

Biggest defeat
- (Rivne Oblast) Rivne 2–0 Lviv (Lviv Oblast) (Rivne; 4 October 2015) (Lviv Oblast) Lviv 0–2 Kirovohrad (Kirovohrad Oblast) (Boryspil; 30 August 2016)

UEFA Regions' Cup
- Appearances: 1 (first in 2019)

The Lviv Oblast football team (Ukrainian: Збірна Львівської області) is a football team representing Lviv Oblast Football Federation and Lviv Oblast. They are not affiliated with FIFA or UEFA, and therefore cannot compete for the FIFA World Cup or the UEFA European Championships.

Lviv competes at the FFU Regions' Cup and at international level they competed at the UEFA Regions' Cup in 2018 finishing 2nd in its group.

== International record ==
Date	Location	Venue	Competition	Opponent	Score ^{(1)}
2 Oct 2018	Lviv, Ukraine	Skif Stadium	UEFA Regions' Cup	(Azerbaijan) Uğur	4–0
5 Oct 2018	Lviv, Ukraine	Skif Stadium	UEFA Regions' Cup	(Finland) Kaarinan Pojat	1–0
8 Oct 2018	Lviv, Ukraine	Skif Stadium	UEFA Regions' Cup	Castile and León	0–1
^{(1)}In the Score column, Lviv Oblast's score is shown first.

== Current squad ==
The following 21 players were called up to the squad for the 2019 UEFA Regions' Cup. Head Coach: (Ukraine) Vitaliy Ponomaryov (FC Mykolaiv)

No.	Pos.	Player	Date of birth (age)	Caps	Goals	Club
1	GK	Marian Burmas		0	0	(Ukraine) FC Mykolaiv
2	GK	Mykhailo Hrytsal		0	0	(Ukraine) FC Rochyn Sosnivka
3	GK	Mykola Voronovskyi		0	0	(Ukraine) LSK Pogon
4		Mykhailo Znetynyak		0	0	(Ukraine) FC Sambir
5		Andriy Terletskyi		0	0	(Ukraine) FC Sambir
6		Ihor Leskiv		0	0	(Ukraine) FC Sambir
7		Nazar Maletskyi		0	0	(Ukraine) FC Sambir
8		Nazar Boyko		0	0	(Ukraine) FC Mykolaiv
9		Roman Tanechnyk		0	0	(Ukraine) FC Mykolaiv
10		Roman Dzyurakh		0	0	(Ukraine) FC Mykolaiv
11		Mykhailo Kot-Kopylyaka		0	0	(Ukraine) FC Mostyska
12		Ivan Yuskevych		0	0	(Ukraine) LSK Pogon
14		Rostyslav Mykhalchuk		0	0	(Ukraine) FC Feniks-Stefano Pidmonastyr
15		Artur Temirov		0	0	(Ukraine) FC Feniks-Stefano Pidmonastyr
16		Oleh Shandor		0	0	(Ukraine) SCC Demnya
17		Ruslan-Roman Mayovetskyi		0	0	(Ukraine) SCC Demnya
18		Svyatoslav Hirnyi		0	0	(Ukraine) FC Yunist Hiyche
19		Bohdan Fostakovskyi		0	0	(Ukraine) FC Hirnyk Novoyavorivsk
20		Nazar Tsyupok		0	0	(Ukraine) FC Rochyn Sosnivka

== Honours ==
UEFA Regions' Cup

- Group stage (1): 2019
