= 2026 Ukrainian Cup final =

Association football match

- The final match venue
- Event: 2025–26 Ukrainian Cup
Chernihiv	Dynamo Kyiv
1	3
- Date: 20 May 2026
- Venue: Arena Lviv, Lviv
- Referee: Oleksandr Shandor
- Attendance: 4,889
- Weather: Rain

The 2026 Ukrainian Cup final is the 33rd final match of the annual Ukrainian football cup competition. It is planned to take place on 20 May 2026 at the Arena Lviv in Lviv between FC Chernihiv and Dynamo Kyiv. This is the second time the cup final will be held in Lviv.

This match became the second final of the Ukrainian Cup to feature a team from a second-tier division (Persha Liha). Previously, this record was set in the 2019 Ukrainian Cup final.

Dynamo Kyiv won the match 3–1 after a brace from Vitaliy Buyalskyi and another goal by Andriy Yarmolenko, resulting in the club winning their 14th Ukrainian Cup trophy. FC Chernihiv managed to equalize through Anatoliy Romanchenko midway through the first half, with both teams going into the break tied at 1. Dynamo Kyiv overwhelmed the newcomers in the second half and secured the win. As winners, they earned the right to play against Shakhtar Donetsk, the winners of the 2025–26 Ukrainian Premier League, in the Ukrainian Super Cup, which has been suspended following the Russian aggression. Dynamo Kyiv also qualified for the 2026–27 UEFA Europa League.

== Road to the final ==
Note: In all results below, the score of the finalist is given first (H: home; A: away; N: neutral).

FC Chernihiv		Round	Dynamo Kyiv
Opponent	Result	2025–26 Ukrainian Cup	Opponent	Result
Atlet Kyiv	1–0 (A)	Round of 64	received bye
Kryvbas Kryvyi Rih	3–0 (H) (Note: Administrative score. The original score 1–1 (1–3 p) was annulled on the decision of the UAF Control and Disciplinary Committee and replaced with a standard administrative score.)	Round of 32	Oleksandriya	2–1 (A)
Lisne	1–1 (4–3 p) (H)	Round of 16	Shakhtar Donetsk	2–1 (H)
Feniks-Mariupol	0–0 (5–4 p) (H)	Quarter-finals	Inhulets Petrove	2–0 (H)
Metalist 1925 Kharkiv	0–0 (6–5 p) (A) (Note: Due to the war conditions in Kharkiv, Metalist 1925 played in Zhytomyr during that season.)	Semi-finals	Bukovyna Chernivtsi	3–0 (N)

=== FC Chernihiv ===
As a First League team, FC Chernihiv started in the Round of 64. They were drawn away against Atlet Kyiv and won 1–0 at the Stadion Atlet in Kyiv, thanks to a goal from Pavlo Shushko. In the Round of 32, they were drawn against Kryvbas Kryvyi Rih at home and, originally, lost on a penalty shootout 1–3 after tying 1–1 at the Chernihiv Arena in Chernihiv. Yehor Tverdokhlib scored for Kryvbas from a penalty spot in the added time of the first half. Soon after the break, Vyacheslav Koydan scored for Chernihiv from a penalty kick as well. Later, the result was annulled on the decision of the Ukrainian Association of Football and replaced with a 3–0 win for Chernihiv, since Kryvbas had too many foreign players on the pitch during the match. Chernihiv advanced. In the Round of 16, they were drawn against Lisne at home, and after tying at 1, they won on a penalty shootout 4–3 at the Chernihiv Arena in Chernihiv. The goal for Chernihiv was scored by Anatoliy Romanchenko from a penalty kick, with less than 15 minutes in regulation. While Serhiy Rybalka scored for Lisne in the added time. In the Quarter-finals, they were drawn with Feniks-Mariupol once again at home, and after tying at 0, they won on a penalty shootout 5–4 at the Chernihiv Arena in Chernihiv. In the Semi-finals, they were drawn away with Metalist 1925 Kharkiv, and after tying 0–0, they won on a penalty shootout 6–5 at the Tsentralnyi Stadion in Zhytomyr.

=== Dynamo Kyiv ===
As a Premier League team, Dynamo Kyiv started in the Round of 32. They were drawn away with Oleksandriya and won 2–1 at the Nika Sports and Concert Complex in Oleksandriya, Kirovohrad Oblast. Pikhalyonok opened the scoring for Dynamo midway through the first half; soon after the break, Serhiy Buletsa netted an equalizer for Oleksandriya; and Ogundana scored a game-winner for Dynamo 5 minutes before the final whistle. In the Round of 16, they were drawn against Shakhtar Donetsk at home and won 2–1 at the Stadion Dynamo imeni Lobanovskoho in Kyiv. The first half ended in a scoreless draw, but immediately after the break, Dynamo were trailing after Luca Meirelles of Shakhtar opened the scoring. Dynamo managed to score twice with goals from Yarmolenko and Guerrero in a 10-minute window, with less than 20 minutes left to play. In the Quarter-Finals, they were drawn with Inhulets Petrove at home and won 2–0 at the Stadion Dynamo imeni Lobanovskoho in Kyiv thanks to goals from Guerrero and Pikhalyonok, both in the second half. In the Semi-Finals, they were drawn with Bukovyna Chernivtsi, who were the hosting team, but the match was held at a neutral field as the Bukovyna home turf did not meet the tournament requirements. Dynamo won 3–0 at the Ternopilskyi miskyi stadion imeni Shukhevycha in Ternopil thanks to a brace from Matviy Ponomarenko and another goal from Voloshyn.

== Previous encounters ==
The final match between Dynamo and Chernihiv is the first one between the two teams at the professional level. Dynamo, who reached their 20th final, will face Chernihiv, who have never reached the quarterfinals of the Ukrainian Cup before and have only played in the last five seasons.

=== Teams at the competition's finals ===
Team	Previous finals appearances (bold indicates winners)
FC Chernihiv	0 (debut)
Dynamo Kyiv	19 (**1993**, **1996**, **1998**, **1999**, **2000**, 2002, **2003**, **2005**, **2006**, **2007**, 2008, 2011, **2014**, **2015**, 2017, 2018, **2020**, **2021**, 2025)

== Match ==
=== Summary ===
The game started a few minutes late due to another Russian air raid alert. Right before the start, the head referee Oleksandr Shandor asked the Chernihiv head coach, Valeriy Chornyi, to leave the team's technical area as he received a disqualification in the Ukrainian First League competitions earlier.

==== First half ====
Dynamo Kyiv took control of the ball from the first minutes, while Chernihiv players actively tried to counter their opponents. The first thrilling moments occurred at the Chernihiv goal post. Shola Ogundana crossed from the left flank, Matviy Ponomarenko shot into the far corner, but Maksym Tatarenko parried. Almost immediately, Vitaliy Buyalskyi scored from Nazar Voloshyn's pass, but Vitaliy was caught in a millimeter offside. In the 17th minute, Tatarenko blocked Ogundana's shot with his legs from inside the penalty area. Immediately, Buyalskyi set up Voloshyn for a shot, but from 5 meters away, he sent the ball over the goal. A few minutes later, another cross from the left flank by Buyalskyi was cleared by the Chernihiv defenders. Volodymyr Brazhko got the rebound and shot under the crossbar, but Tatarenko turned it into a corner. Next, Ogundana played a one-two with Buyalskyi, entered the penalty area, and drilled a cross to Ponomarenko, whose shot was blocked, but, after a rebound, Buyalskyi shot powerfully and without a chance. 0:1. Voloshyn could have doubled his team's advantage, but his shot from the right flank to the far corner of the goal post was saved by Tatarenko. In the 34th minute, Chernihiv unexpectedly leveled the score. Yehor Shalfyeyev took a free kick, and Anatoliy Romanchenko won the duel against Mykola Shaparenko and chipped a header into the far corner. 1-1. A few minutes later, Ponomarenko drilled a cross from the right flank to Shaparenko, but Tatarenko saved Mykola's shot from 6 meters. Before the whistle for the break, Denys Bezborodko played a one-two with Shalfyeyev, got face-to-face with Ruslan Neshcheret, but missed the far corner of the goal post. After the first half, Dynamo Kyiv was leading in shots 16 to 2 and shots on goal 7 to 1.

==== Second half ====
In the second half, the Kyiv team came out determined to score immediately, and they managed to do so quite quickly. In the 53rd minute, Shaparenko redirected Oleksandr Karavayev's cross from the right flank with a heel to Ponomarenko, Matviy passed it to Buyalskyi for a shot, and he scored past Tatarenko for the second time. 1-2. Chernihiv also did not sit on defense. A deep pass to Shalfyeyev was deflected by Neshcheret with a head outside the penalty area. Kyiv continued to attack and soon scored for the third time. Andriy Yarmolenko intercepted the ball on the right flank, played a one-two with Eduardo Guerrero, and then shot low into the far corner. 1:3. Then Dynamo Kyiv players controlled the course of the game and didn't let the opponent create anything. They themselves had a few half-chances, but there were no more goals.

=== Details ===
20 May 2026

Chernihiv (1L)	1–3	(PL) Dynamo Kyiv
Romanchenko 34'	Report	Buyalskyi 26', 53'; Yarmolenko 70'

Arena Lviv, Lviv
Attendance: 4,889
Referee: Oleksandr Shandor (Lviv)

**Chernihiv**	**Dynamo Kyiv**

Chernihiv:
GK	35	(Ukraine) Maksym Tatarenko (c)
LB	12	(Ukraine) Yehor Kartushov	(yellow card) 23'
CB	23	(Ukraine) Oleksiy Zenchenko
CB	55	(Ukraine) Anatoliy Romanchenko
RB	2	(Ukraine) Eduard Halstyan	(yellow card) 60'
DM	38	(Ukraine) Pavlo Shushko	(substituted off) 58'
CM	8	(Ukraine) Artur Bybik
CM	6	(Ukraine) Yehor Shalfyeyev	(substituted off) 69'
LW	77	(Ukraine) Maksym Serdyuk	(substituted off) 87'
RW	33	(Ukraine) Andriy Porokhnya	(substituted off) 69'
FW	21	(Ukraine) Denys Bezborodko	(substituted off) 58'
Substitutions:
MF	7	(Ukraine) Dmytro Myronenko	(substituted on) 58'
FW	9	(Ukraine) Dmytro Kulyk	(substituted on) 69'
MF	10	(Ukraine) Vyacheslav Koydan	(substituted on) 69' (yellow card) 84'
MF	13	(Ukraine) Dzhilindo Bezghubchenko	(substituted on) 58'
DF	17	(Ukraine) Vladyslav Chaban
DF	20	(Ukraine) Dmytro Fatyeyev
GK	22	(Ukraine) Oleksandr Roshchynskyi
MF	24	(Ukraine) Dmytro Didok	(substituted on) 87'
MF	30	(Ukraine) Nikita Teplyakov
MF	88	(Ukraine) Andriy Stolyarchuk
MF	95	(Ukraine) Vladyslav Shapoval
GK	99	(Ukraine) Denys Herasymenko
Assistant head coach:
(Ukraine) Andriy Polyanytsya

Dynamo Kyiv:
GK	35	(Ukraine) Ruslan Neshcheret
LB	2	(Ukraine) Kostyantyn Vivcharenko
CB	32	(Ukraine) Taras Mykhavko
CB	40	(Ukraine) Kristian Bilovar	(substituted off) 85'
RB	20	(Ukraine) Oleksandr Karavayev
DM	6	(Ukraine) Volodymyr Brazhko
CM	10	(Ukraine) Mykola Shaparenko	(substituted off) 56'
CM	29	(Ukraine) Vitaliy Buyalskyi (c)	(substituted off) 73'
LW	16	(Nigeria) Shola Ogundana	(substituted off) 56'
RW	9	(Ukraine) Nazar Voloshyn
FW	11	(Ukraine) Matviy Ponomarenko	(substituted off) 56'
Substitutions:
DF	4	(Ukraine) Denys Popov
MF	5	(Ukraine) Oleksandr Yatsyk
FW	7	(Ukraine) Andriy Yarmolenko	(substituted on) 56'
MF	8	(Ukraine) Oleksandr Pikhalyonok	(substituted on) 56'
DF	13	(Ukraine) Maksym Korobov
MF	14	(Ukraine) Pavlo Lyusin
FW	19	(Ukraine) Vitaliy Lobko
DF	34	(Ukraine) Vladyslav Zakharchenko	(substituted on) 85'
FW	39	(Panama) Eduardo Guerrero	(substituted on) 56'
GK	51	(Ukraine) Valentyn Morhun
GK	71	(Ukraine) Vyacheslav Surkis
MF	91	(Ukraine) Mykola Mykhaylenko	(substituted on) 73'
Head coach:
(Ukraine) Ihor Kostyuk

**Match officials**

- Referee assistants:
  - Viktor Nyzhnyk (Vinnytsia)
  - Stanislav Marulin (Kherson Oblast)
- Fourth referee: Oleksandr Afanasyev (Kharkiv)
- Additional referee assistant: Svitlana Hrushko (Kyiv Oblast)
- Refereeing supervisor: Mykhailo Ovchar (Kalush).
- VAR referee — Volodymyr Novokhatniy (Cherkasy)
- VAR assistant — Dmytro Panchyshyn (Kharkiv)
- VAR supervisor — Yuriy Moseychuk (Chernivtsi).
- UAF delegate — Taras Klym (Ivano-Frankivsk).

**Regulation highlightes**

- 90 minutes.
- 30 minutes of extra time if needed.
- Penalty kicks if needed.
- 12 players for substitution.
- Maximum 5 substitution per match (+1 in case of extra time).

== See also ==
- 2025–26 Ukrainian Premier League
- 2025–26 Ukrainian First League
