= 2025–26 FC Chernihiv season =

Football club season

Chernihiv
2025–26 season
- Owner: Yuriy Synytsya
- Director: Mykola Synytsya
- Manager: Valeriy Chornyi
- Stadium: Chernihiv Arena
- Ukrainian First League: 13th
- Ukrainian Cup: Runners-up
- Top goalscorer: League: Andriy Novikov (6 goals); All: Andriy Novikov (6 goals); Vyacheslav Koydan (6 goals)
- Highest home attendance: 1500 (vs Chornomorets Odesa, 18 October 2025)
- Biggest win: Chernihiv 4-0 Livyi Bereh Kyiv
- Biggest defeat: Bukovyna Chernivtsi 4-1 Chernihiv; Chernihiv 1-4 Feniks-Mariupol
Home colours	Away colours	Third colours

During the 2025–26 season, FC Chernihiv competed in the Ukrainian First League. In addition to the domestic league, FC Chernihiv participated in this season's editions of the Ukrainian Cup.

== Season summary ==
In June 2025, following the promotion, the management's club extended the contracts of Maksym Shumylo, Anatoliy Romanchenko On 27 June Artur Bybik and the goalkeeper Maksym Tatarenko signed a new contract extension. On 30 July, FC Chernihiv announced the signing of Andriy Stolyarchuk. Following the promotion, a few players signed a new contract extension. FC Chernihiv signed young players such as Andriy Stolyarchuk and Nikita Dorosh on loan from FC Rukh Lviv. On 1 August 2025, the club signed young players such as Dmytro Didok and Nikita Terrekhovets from Chernihiv U19. Few players left the club: Pavlo Fedosov, Vitaliy Mentey, Oleksandr Shyray and Nikita Posmashnyi. On 17 August Chernihiv won their first match of Ukrainian First League against Prykarpattia Ivano-Frankivsk at the MCS Rukh thanks to three goals of Vyacheslav Koydan. On 24 August Chernihiv announced the signing of Nikita Dorosh on loan from Rukh Lviv. On 6 September, the match between Chernihiv and Livyi Bereh Kyiv was postponed due to a prolonged air raid warning in Chernihiv Oblast. On 21 September 2025, during the Chernihiv City Day celebrations, another match between FC Chernihiv and Metalist Kharkiv was postponed due to a prolonged alarm. After an hour-long wait, the Kharkiv club decided not to play, considering the situation dangerous. On 23 September, 2025, the club awarded Artur Bybik, Anatoliy Romanchenko, and Maksym Serdyuk with special jerseys for reaching 100 official appearances for the club. On 24 October, a third match between FC Chernihiv and Metalurh Zaporizhzhia in Chernihiv was postponed due to a prolonged air raid warning. In November 2025, the club extended the contracts of Yehor Kartushov and Dmytro Kulyk. In December 2025, the goalkeeper Maksym Tatarenko was named best player in the season. On 9 January, FC Chernihiv announced the signing of Mykyta Teplyakov on a contract until 30 June 2027 In February 2026, the club extended the contracts of Dmytro Fatyeyev, Artur Bybik, Pavlo Shushko and Yehor Shalfeyev. On 7 March 2026, the club signed Denys Bezborodko just released by Kudrivka. On 11 March 2026 the club signed Vladyslav Shapoval on loan from FC Kudrivka.

=== Road to Ukrainian Cup Final ===
In October 2025, FC Chernihiv qualified for the round of 16 of the Ukrainian Cup. On 28 October 2025, FC Chernihiv qualified for the round of 8 of the Ukrainian Cup for the first time in the club's history by beating FC Lisne on penalties at the Chernihiv Arena. On 18 March 2026 in the Quarter-finals of the Ukrainian Cup, they were drawn to Feniks-Mariupol and won on a penalty shootout 5–4 after tying 0–0, reached the semi-finals of the Ukrainian Cup for the first time in the club's history. In the Semi-finals, they were drawn away with Metalist 1925 Kharkiv, they won on a penalty shootout 6–5 at the Tsentralnyi Stadion in Zhytomyr. On 22 May 2026, for the 2026 Ukrainian Cup final, the club faced Dynamo Kyiv at the Arena Lviv, where the first half ended 1-1 and at the end of the second half the FC Chernihiv lost 1-3 at the Arena Lviv.

== Players ==
=== Squad information ===
As of 14 May 2026

Squad no.	Name	Nationality	Position	Date of birth (age)
Goalkeepers
22	Oleksandr Roshchynskyi	(Ukraine)	GK	30 November 2000 (aged 24)
35	Maksym Tatarenko (Captain)	(Ukraine)	GK	7 May 1999 (aged 26)
99	Denys Herasymenko	(Ukraine)	GK	7 October 2005 (aged 19)
Defenders
2	Eduard Halstyan	(Ukraine) (Armenia)	DF	1 October 1998 (aged 26)
3	Maksym Shumylo	(Ukraine)	DF	31 August 2002 (aged 22)
20	Dmytro Fatyeyev	(Ukraine)	DF	21 June 1994 (aged 31)
23	Oleksiy Zenchenko (3rd captain)	(Ukraine)	DF	17 October 1996 (aged 28)
30	Mykyta Teplyakov	(Ukraine)	DF	18 November 2000 (aged 24)
38	Pavlo Shushko	(Ukraine)	DF	7 May 2000 (aged 25)
50	Oleksandr Moroz	(Ukraine)	DF	18 March 2009 (aged 16)
80	Nikita Terrekhovets	(Ukraine)	DF	9 December 2007 (aged 17)
95	Vladyslav Shapoval (on loan from Kudrivka)	(Ukraine)	DF	8 May 1995 (aged 30)
Midfielders
6	Yehor Shalfeyev	(Ukraine)	MF	3 October 1998 (aged 26)
7	Dmytro Myronenko (vice-captain)	(Ukraine)	MF	7 March 1996 (aged 29)
8	Artur Bybik	(Ukraine)	MF	26 July 2001 (aged 23)
10	Vyacheslav Koydan	(Ukraine)	MF	5 July 1994 (aged 31)
12	Yehor Kartushov	(Ukraine)	MF	5 January 1991 (aged 34)
13	Dzhilindo Bezghubchenko	(Ukraine)	MF	7 February 2003 (aged 22)
14	Dmytro Sakhno	(Ukraine)	MF	7 February 2003 (aged 22)
17	Vladyslav Chaban (on loan from Inhulets Petrove)	(Ukraine)	MF	11 January 2003 (aged 22)
19	Nikita Posmashnyi	(Ukraine)	MF	10 June 2003 (aged 22)
19	Nikita Dorosh (on loan from Rukh Lviv)	(Ukraine)	MF	11 April 2007 (aged 18)
21	Vladyslav Shkolnyi	(Ukraine)	MF	14 March 1999 (aged 26)
24	Dmytro Didok	(Ukraine)	DF	24 January 2007 (aged 18)
33	Andriy Porokhnya	(Ukraine)	MF	17 February 1997 (aged 28)
55	Anatoliy Romanchenko	(Ukraine)	MF	19 May 2001 (aged 24)
77	Maksym Serdyuk	(Ukraine)	MF	21 May 2002 (aged 23)
88	Andriy Stolyarchuk	(Ukraine)	MF	4 July 2004 (aged 21)
Forwards
9	Dmytro Kulyk	(Ukraine)	FW	26 January 2001 (aged 24)
11	Andriy Novikov	(Ukraine)	FW	20 April 1999 (aged 26)
21	Denys Bezborodko	(Ukraine)	FW	31 March 1994 (aged 31)
25	Daniil Volskyi	(Ukraine)	FW	7 July 2004 (aged 21)
51	Artem Tytenko	(Ukraine)	FW	12 February 2009 (aged 16)
69	Ilya Yevchenko	(Ukraine)	FW	29 November 2009 (aged 15)

== Management team ==
Position	Name	Year appointed	Last club/team
Manager	(Ukraine) Valeriy Chornyi	2021	Avanhard Koriukivka
Assistant Coach	(Ukraine) Andriy Polyanytsya	2022	SDYuShOR Desna Chernihiv
Goalkeeping Coach	(Ukraine) Artem Padun	2020	SDYuShOR Desna Chernihiv

== Transfers ==
=== In ===
Date	Pos.	Player	Age	Moving from	Type	Fee	Source
Summer
4 July 2025	MF	(Ukraine) Maksym Serdyuk	23	(Ukraine) Livyi Bereh Kyiv	Transfer	Free	
29 July 2025	MF	(Ukraine) Andriy Stolyarchuk	21	Unattached	Transfer	Free	
1 August 2025	MF	(Ukraine) Dmytro Didok	18	(Ukraine) Chernihiv U-19	Transfer	Free	
1 August 2025	MF	(Ukraine) Nikita Terrekhovets	18	(Ukraine) Chernihiv U-19	Transfer	Free	
24 August 2025	MF	(Ukraine) Nikita Dorosh	18	(Ukraine) Rukh Lviv	Loan	Free	
5 September 2025	MF	(Ukraine) Vladyslav Chaban	22	(Ukraine) Inhulets Petrove	Loan	Free	
Winter
9 January 2026	DF	(Ukraine) Oleksandr Moroz	16	(Ukraine) Chernihiv U-19	Transfer	Free	
9 January 2026	FW	(Ukraine) Artem Tytenko	16	(Ukraine) Chernihiv U-19	Transfer	Free	
9 January 2026	DF	(Ukraine) Mykyta Teplyakov	24	Unattached	Transfer	Free	
7 March 2026	FW	(Ukraine) Denys Bezborodko	31	(Ukraine) Kudrivka	Transfer	Free	
11 March 2026	DF	(Ukraine) Vladyslav Shapoval	30	(Ukraine) Kudrivka	Loan	Free	

=== Out ===
Date	Pos.	Player	Age	Moving from	Type	Fee	Source
Summer
30 June 2025	MF	(Ukraine) Maksym Serdyuk	23	(Ukraine) Livyi Bereh Kyiv	Loan Return	Free	
30 June 2025	FW	(Ukraine) Pavlo Fedosov	28	Unattached	Released	Free	
1 July 2025	MF	(Ukraine) Vitaliy Mentey	32	Unattached	Released	Free	
1 July 2025	GK	(Ukraine) Oleksandr Shyray	33	Unattached	Released	Free	
14 August 2025	MF	(Ukraine) Nikita Posmashnyi	22	Unattached	Released	Free	
19 September 2025	MF	(Ukraine) Dmytro Sakhno	22	Unattached	Released	Free	
Winter
31 January 2026	MF	(Ukraine) Vladyslav Shkolnyi	26	Unattached	Released	Free	

== Pre-season and friendlies ==
Win Draw Loss

5 July 2025 Friendly	Livyi Bereh Kyiv (Ukraine)	1–1	(Ukraine) Chernihiv	Kiev
EET (UTC+02:00)	Riznyk 41'	Report	Novikov 3'

12 July 2025 Friendly	Viktoriya Sumy (Ukraine)	1–0	(Ukraine) Chernihiv	Boryspil
EET (UTC+02:00)	Palamar 45'	Report		Stadium: Kolos Stadium

16 July 2025 Friendly	Polissya-2 Zhytomyr (Ukraine)	3–2	(Ukraine) Chernihiv	Zhytomyr
EET (UTC+02:00)		Report	Porokhnya 23'; Koydan 32'

19 July 2025 Friendly	Chernihiv (Ukraine)	1–3	(Ukraine) Lokomotyv Kyiv	Chernihiv
EET (UTC+02:00)	Kulyk 11'			Stadium: Khimik Sport Complex

23 July 2025 Friendly	UCSA Tarasivka (Ukraine)	2–0	(Ukraine) Chernihiv	Bucha
EET (UTC+02:00)	Fogo 78'; Fogo 80'	Report		Stadium: Stadium Yuvileinyi

11 February 2026 Friendly	Chernihiv (Ukraine)	x–x	(Ukraine) Chernihiv U19	Chernihiv
EET (UTC+02:00)	Fogo 78'; Fogo 80'			Stadium: Chernihiv Arena

13 February 2026 Friendly	Atlet Kyiv (Ukraine)	0–4	(Ukraine) Chernihiv	Kiev
EET (UTC+02:00)			Bezborodko 6'; Novikov 61'; Myronenko 83'; Shalfeyev 85'	Stadium: Skylark Arena

18 February 2026 Friendly	Rebel Kyiv (Ukraine)	2–2	(Ukraine) Chernihiv	Kiev
EET (UTC+02:00)	Panov 13'; Andrukhiv 35'	Report	Stolyarchuk 8'; Novikov 12'	Stadium: Urban Sport City

22 February 2026 Friendly	Chernihiv (Ukraine)	0–1	(Ukraine) Viktoriya Sumy	Chernihiv
EET (UTC+02:00)		Report	Knysh 23'	Stadium: Chernihiv Arena

28 February 2026 Friendly	Lokomotyv Kyiv (Ukraine)	0–1	(Ukraine) Chernihiv	Kiev
EET (UTC+02:00)		Report	Bezborodko 11'	Stadium: Skylark Arena

4 March 2026 Friendly	Polissya-2 Zhytomyr (Ukraine)	4–0	(Ukraine) Chernihiv	Zhytomyr
EET (UTC+02:00)		Report		Stadium: Berezina, NTC Polissia

7 March 2026 Friendly	Denhoff (Ukraine)	2–2	(Ukraine) Chernihiv	Kiev
EET (UTC+11:00)	Somov 35'; Koziy 83'	Report	Terekhovets 55'; Bezborodko 69'	Stadium: Skylark Arena

7 March 2026 Friendly	Chernihiv (Ukraine)	3–1	(Ukraine) FC Bratslav	Kiev
EET (UTC+14:00)	Teplyakov 31'; Novikov 39'; Stolyarchuk 54'			Stadium: Skylark Arena

== Competitions ==
=== Overall ===
Competition	First match	Last match	Starting round	Final position	Record							
Competition	First match	Last match	Starting round	Final position	Pld	W	D	L	GF	GA	GD	Win %
First League	3 August 2025	1 June 2026	9th	13th	30	8	7	15	30	35	−5	26.67
Ukrainian Cup	25 August 2025	20 May 2026	Round of 64 (1/32)	Runner-Up	6	5	0	1	6	5	+1	83.33
Total					36	13	7	16	36	40	−4	36.11

Last updated: 1 June 2026
Source: Competitions

=== First League ===
==== League table ====
Pos	Team	Pld	W	D	L	GF	GA	GD	Pts	Promotion, qualification or relegation
1	Bukovyna Chernivtsi (P, C)	30	26	3	1	74	21	+53	81	Promotion to Ukrainian Premier League
2	Chornomorets Odesa (P)	30	19	8	3	44	20	+24	65	Promotion to Ukrainian Premier League
3	Livyi Bereh Kyiv (O, P)	30	19	6	5	50	21	+29	63	Qualification to promotion play-offs
4	Ahrobiznes Volochysk	30	16	5	9	36	28	+8	53	Qualification to promotion play-offs
5	Inhulets Petrove	30	12	10	8	41	32	+9	46	
6	Prykarpattia-Blaho	30	9	10	11	33	33	0	37	
7	Metalist Kharkiv	30	10	7	13	31	35	−4	37	
8	Probiy Horodenka	30	10	6	14	29	37	−8	36 (Note: Ranked on head-to-head points Head-to-head goal difference Head-to-head goals scored: Probiy Horodenka 12 +3 5, Feniks-Mariupol 10 +3 5, Viktoriya Sumy 4 -3 6, UCSA Tarasivka 4 -3 2)	
9	Feniks-Mariupol	30	9	9	12	31	32	−1	36	
10	Viktoriya Sumy	30	10	6	14	37	38	−1	36	
11	UCSA Tarasivka	30	10	6	14	30	40	−10	36	
12	Nyva Ternopil	30	8	10	12	24	34	−10	34	
13	Chernihiv	30	8	7	15	30	36	−6	31	
14	Vorskla Poltava (W)	30	7	9	14	23	36	−13	30	Denied license
15	Podillya Khmelnytskyi (R)	30	4	9	17	20	45	−25	21	Relegation to Ukrainian Second League
16	Metalurh Zaporizhzhia (R)	30	4	7	19	16	61	−45	19	Relegation to Ukrainian Second League

Source: PFL.ua
Rules for classification: 1) Points; 2) Head-to-head points; 3) Head-to-head goal difference; 4) Head-to-head goals scored; 5) Goal difference in all games; 6) Goals scored in all games (Note: calculation by criteria indicated in rules 2, 3, 4 is conducted with consideration of all teams that have an equal number of tournament points at the moment of calculation and not only among those which after preliminary criteria have appeared more successful).
(C) Champions; (O) Relegation play-offs winner; (P) Promoted; (R) Relegated; (W) Denied license for the next season
Notes:

The relegation–promotion play-off games were expected to be scheduled to take place between the 13th- and 14th-placed teams with the third- and fourth-placed teams of the Second League. The draw was held on May 14, 2026. Following the withdrawal of Rukh Lviv in the Premier League, relegation play-offs were reduced, but later were canceled as Vorskla Poltava failed to receive the Professional Football League license for the next season. The third and fourth-placed teams of the Second League had received direct promotion to the First League.

==== Results summary ====
Overall								Home						Away					
Pld	W	D	L	GF	GA	GD	Pts	W	D	L	GF	GA	GD	W	D	L	GF	GA	GD
30	8	7	15	30	35	−5	31	5	3	7	20	19	+1	3	4	8	10	16	−6

Last updated: 1 June 2026.
Source: Competitive matches

==== Results by round ====
Round	1	2	3	4	5	6	7	8	9	10	11	12	13	14	15	16	17	18	19	20	21	22	23	24	25	26	27	28	29	30	31	32	33	34	35	36
Ground	A	H	A	A		A		A	H	A	H	A		A	H	A		A	H		H	H	H	H	H	A	H	A	H	A	H		H	H	A	A
Result	L	L	W	L		L		L	D	W	W	L		D	L	D		L	W		W	D	L	W	L	L	W	D	L	W	D		L	L	D	L
Position	9	12	12	13		14		16	16	14	11	13		13	14	13		14	14		11	10	10	10	12	12	12	11	13	10	11		13	13	13	13

Updated to match(es) played on 1 June 2026. Source: Competitive matches
A = Away; H = Home; W = Win; D = Draw; L = Loss

==== Matches ====
3 August 2025 1	Probiy Horodenka	1–0	FC Chernihiv	Horodenka
15:30 EEST (UTC+03:00)	Felipovych 3'; Orynchak (yellow card) 38'; Kharuk (yellow card) 55'; Bilyi (yellow card) 84'; Borysevych (yellow card) 87'	Report	Koydan (yellow card) 24'; Fatyeyev (yellow card) 85'; Serdyuk (yellow card) 87'	Stadium: Probiy Arena; Attendance: 1100; Referee: Mykola Baydyuk

9 August 2025 2	FC Chernihiv	1–2	Viktoriya Sumy	Chernihiv
15:30 EEST (UTC+03:00)	Novikov 9'; Shumylo (yellow card) 12'; Shushko (yellow card) 90+4'	Report	Yevpak 22'; Knysh 24'; Seytkhalilov (yellow card) 60'	Stadium: Chernihiv Arena; Attendance: 280; Referee: Oleksandr Tytov

17 August 2025 3	Prykarpattia Ivano-Frankivsk	0–3	FC Chernihiv	Ivano-Frankivsk
15:30 EEST (UTC+03:00)	Bespalko (yellow card) 55'; Barchuk (yellow card) 65'; Radulskyi (yellow card) 76'; Tytov (yellow card) 80'	Report	Koydan 65'; Fatyeyev (yellow card) 44'; Serdyuk (yellow card) 50'; Koydan 54'; Koydan 62'; Myronenko (yellow card) 90'	Stadium: MCS Rukh; Attendance: 800; Referee: Igor Sadkovskij

31 August 2025 4	Feniks-Mariupol	1–0	FC Chernihiv	Lviv
15:30 EEST (UTC+03:00)	Sydorenko 19'; Kusyi (yellow card) 30'	Report	Sakhno (yellow card) 15'; Bybik (yellow card) 58'	Stadium: Skif Stadium; Attendance: 200; Referee: Mykola Baydyuk

6 September 2025	FC Chernihiv	Postponed	Livyi Bereh Kyiv	Chernihiv
15:30 EEST (UTC+03:00)				Stadium: Chernihiv Arena

12 September 2025 5	Bukovyna Chernivtsi	4–1	FC Chernihiv	Chernivtsi
15:30 EEST (UTC+03:00)	Boychuk 21'; Honcharuk 57'; Boychuk 69'; Stasyuk (yellow card) 86'; Boychuk 90+5'	Report	Koydan 79'; Shumylo (yellow card) 84'	Stadium: Bukovyna Stadium; Attendance: 700; Referee: Vitaliy Malyar

20 September 2025	FC Chernihiv	Postponed	Metalist Kharkiv	Chernihiv
15:30 EEST (UTC+03:00)				Stadium: Chernihiv Arena

28 September 2025 6	Nyva Ternopil	2–0	FC Chernihiv	Ternopil
15:30 EEST (UTC+03:00)	Mykhayliv (yellow card) 66'; Mysyk 37'; Mykhayliv (yellow card) 83'; Demydenko (yellow card) 87'; Ugrynyuk 90+7'	Report	Shalfeyev (yellow card) 64'; Bybik (yellow card) 90+4'	Stadium: Miskyi imeni Shukhevycha; Attendance: 1100; Referee: Mykola Baydyuk

4 October 2025 7	FC Chernihiv	1–1	Podillya Khmelnytskyi	Chernihiv
15:30 EEST (UTC+03:00)	Koydan (yellow card) 13'; Porokhnya (yellow card) 33'; Porokhnya 42'; Shushko (yellow card) 76'	Report	Profatylo 7'; Sitalo (yellow card) 36'; Snizhko (yellow card) 90+2'	Stadium: Chernihiv Arena; Attendance: 223

8 October 2025 8	Vorskla Poltava	0–1	FC Chernihiv	Poltava
15:30 EEST (UTC+03:00)	Chibueze (yellow card) 27'; Dmytruk (yellow card) 43'	Report	Kulyk (yellow card) 44'; Kulyk 62'; Shushko (yellow card) 79'; Porokhnya (yellow card) 90+5'	Stadium: Vorskla Stadium; Attendance: 350; Referee: Maksym Skrypnyk

12 October 2025 9	FC Chernihiv	2–0	UCSA Tarasivka	Chernihiv
15:30 EEST (UTC+03:00)	Bezghubchenko 16'; Shalfeyev 48'; Shalfeyev (yellow card) 68'; Tatarenko (yellow card) 79'	Report	Yevdokymov (yellow card) 34'; Yuvkhymets (yellow card) 64'	Stadium: Chernihiv Arena; Attendance: 180

18 October 2025 10	Chornomorets Odesa	1–0	FC Chernihiv	Odesa
15:30 EEST (UTC+03:00)	Habelok (yellow card) 14'; Ryce 41'; Ryce (yellow card) 42'; Khacheridi (yellow card) 53'; Kohut (yellow card) 63'	Report	Shalfeyev (yellow card) 21'; Shushko (yellow card) 26'	Stadium: Chornomorets Stadium; Attendance: 1500

25 October 2025	FC Chernihiv	Postponed	Metalurh Zaporizhzhia	Chernihiv
15:30 EEST (UTC+03:00)				Stadium: Chernihiv Arena

2 November 2025 11	Inhulets Petrove	1–1	FC Chernihiv	Petrove
15:30 EEST (UTC+03:00)	Pyatov 19'; Dykhtyaruk (yellow card) 68'	Report	Chaban 8'; Novikov (yellow card) 61'; Zenchenko (yellow card) 36' (yellow-red card) 90+3'	Stadium: Inhulets Stadium

8 November 2025 12	FC Chernihiv	0–2	Ahrobiznes Volochysk	Chernihiv
15:30 EEST (UTC+03:00)	Shumylo (yellow card) 67'	Report	Kuzmyn 62'; Voytikhovskyi 90+3'	Stadium: Chernihiv Arena; Attendance: 145; Referee: Ukhov Anatoliy

12 November 2026 13	Livyi Bereh Kyiv	1–1	FC Chernihiv	Kyiv Oblast
13:00 EEST (UTC+03:00)	Shastal 18'; Sidnney (yellow card) 75'; Yakymiv (yellow card) 90+2'; Riznyk (yellow card) 90+6'	Report	Bezghubchenko 7'; Romanchenko (yellow card) 25'; Volskyi (yellow card) 81'; Didok (yellow card) 90+4'; Tatarenko (yellow card) 90+4'	Stadium: Arena Livyi Bereh; Attendance: 140; Referee: Myroslav Lipko

16 November 2025 14	FC Chernihiv	Postponed	Probiy Horodenka	Chernihiv
15:30 EEST (UTC+03:00)				Stadium: Chernihiv Arena

22 November 2025 15	Viktoriya Sumy	3–0	FC Chernihiv	Sumy
15:30 EEST (UTC+03:00)	Dolinskyi 7'; Dolinskyi (yellow card) 48'; Knysh (yellow card) 64'; Sharay 80'; Savytskyi 90+2'	Report	Bezghubchenko (yellow card) 58'; Myronenko (yellow card) 73'; Fatyeyev (yellow card) 85'	Stadium: Yuvileiny Stadium; Attendance: 0 Referee: Vitaliy Malyar

29 November 2025 16	FC Chernihiv	1–0	Prykarpattia Ivano-Frankivsk	Chernihiv
15:30 EEST (UTC+03:00)	Myronenko 32'; Novikov (yellow card) 36'; Shalfeyev (yellow card) 38'; Halstyan (yellow card) 90'	Report	Mykhalchuk (yellow card) 21'; Tsyutsyura (yellow card) 90+4'	Stadium: Chernihiv Arena; Attendance: 150; Referee: Kristina Kozoroh

4 December 2025 17	FC Chernihiv	Postponed	Metalurh Zaporizhzhia	Chernihiv
15:30 EEST (UTC+03:00)				Stadium: Chernihiv Arena

9 December 2025 18	FC Chernihiv	3–0	Probiy Horodenka	Chernihiv
15:30 EEST (UTC+03:00)	Serdyuk 17'; Novikov 20'; Stolyarchuk 48'	Report	Borysevych (yellow card) 74'	Stadium: Chernihiv Arena; Attendance: 97; Referee: Stepan Lapko

15 December 2025 19	FC Chernihiv	1–1	Metalurh Zaporizhzhia	Chernihiv
15:30 EEST (UTC+03:00)	Shalfeyev (yellow card) 29'; Fatyeyev 87'	Report	Lisnyak 8'	Stadium: Chernihiv Arena; Attendance: 87; Referee: Oleksandr Tytov

21 March 2026 20	FC Chernihiv	1–4	Feniks-Mariupol	Chernihiv
15:30 EEST (UTC+03:00)	Novikov 34'; Shushko (yellow card) 30'; Bybik (yellow card) 50'; Romanchenko (yellow card) 89'	Report	Sydorenko 15'; Remenyak 26'; Horin (yellow card) 45'; Orikhovskyi 48'; Balaba (yellow card) 81'; Synytsya 87'; Revakovych (yellow card) 90+1'	Stadium: Chernihiv Arena; Attendance: 130

29 March 2026 21	FC Chernihiv	4–0	Livyi Bereh Kyiv	Chernihiv
15:30 EEST (UTC+03:00)	Serdyuk 8'; Shumylo (yellow card) 45+1'; Novikov 45+2'; Bezborodko 48'; Novikov 62'; Zenchenko (yellow card) 67'; Serdyuk (yellow card) 79'	Report	Shastal (yellow card) 51'; Henrique (yellow card) 66'	Stadium: Chernihiv Arena; Attendance: 350

4 April 2026 22	FC Chernihiv	0–1	Bukovyna Chernivtsi	Chernihiv
15:30 EEST (UTC+03:00)	Shalfeyev (yellow card) 63'; Romanchenko (yellow card) 80'; Stolyarchuk (yellow card) 89'	Report	Dakhnovskyi (yellow card) 84'; Voytikhovskyi 86'	Stadium: Chernihiv Arena; Attendance: 400

8 April 2026 23	Metalist Kharkiv	2–1	FC Chernihiv	Uzhhorod
15:30 EEST (UTC+03:00)	Bahachanskyi 26'; Bahachanskyi (yellow card) 82'; Kaydalov 89'	Report	Romanchenko (yellow card) 58'; Shapoval (yellow card) 68'; Stolyarchuk 86'	Stadium: Avanhard Stadium; Attendance: 100

11 April 2026 24	FC Chernihiv	1–0	Nyva Ternopil	Chernihiv
12:00 EEST (UTC+03:00)	Novikov 39'; Halstyan (yellow card) 47'; Zenchenko (yellow card) 50'; Serdyuk (penalty missed); Porokhnya (yellow card) 90+1'	Report	Bats (yellow card) 64'; Mykhayliv (yellow card) 70'	Stadium: Chernihiv Arena; Attendance: 367

18 April 2026 25	Podillya Khmelnytskyi	0–0	FC Chernihiv	Podillia
15:30 EEST (UTC+03:00)	Kvasov (yellow card) 83'	Report	Shushko (yellow card) 44'; Myronenko (yellow card) 83'; Tatarenko (yellow card) 90+2'	Stadium: Sport Complex Podillia; Attendance: 756

25 April 2026 26	FC Chernihiv	1–2	Vorskla Poltava	Chernihiv
15:30 EEST (UTC+03:00)	Teplyakov (yellow card) 66'; Koydan 84'	Report	Potskhveria 9'; Baydal 41'	Stadium: Chernihiv Arena; Attendance: 225

2 May 2026 27	UCSA Tarasivka	0–2	FC Chernihiv	Bucha
15:30 EEST (UTC+03:00)	Castro (yellow card) 44'; Yevdokymov (yellow card) 55'; Zakhidnyi (yellow card) 5' (yellow-red card) 71'; Wendell (yellow card) 90'	Report	Myronenko (yellow card) 18'; Bezborodko 20'; Halstyan (yellow card) 45+1'; Bezghubchenko 63'; Shalfyeyev (yellow card) 72'; Romanchenko (yellow card) 72'	Stadium: Stadion Yuvileinyi

9 May 2026 28	FC Chernihiv	2–2	Chornomorets Odesa	Chernihiv
15:30 EEST (UTC+03:00)	Romanchenko 14'; Bezborodko 46'; Kartushov (yellow card) 73'	Report	Khoma 31'; Klymenko (yellow card) 45'; Yermakov 76'	Stadium: Chernihiv Arena; Attendance: 300; Referee: Stepan Lapko (Lviv)

16 May 2026	Metalurh Zaporizhzhia	Postponed	FC Chernihiv	Zaporizhzhia
15:30 EEST (UTC+03:00)				Stadium: Slavutych-Arena

23 May 2026 29	FC Chernihiv	1–2	Inhulets Petrove	Chernihiv
15:30 EEST (UTC+03:00)	Shalfyeyev (yellow card) 71'; Porokhnya (yellow card) 76'; Shalfyeyev 90+3'	Report	Benedyuk 41'; Kasimov 45+3'; Dubiley (yellow card) 52'; Dykhtyaruk (yellow card) 71'; Manastyrnyi (yellow card) 83'	Stadium: Chernihiv Arena; Attendance: 260; Referee: Vitaliy Painter

26 May 2026 30	FC Chernihiv	1–2	Metalist Kharkiv	Chernihiv
15:30 EEST (UTC+03:00)	Zenchenko 13'; Bezghubchenko (yellow card) 18'; Koydan (yellow card) 87'	Report	Prykhodko 59'; Orikhovskyi (yellow card) 31'; Kaydalov (yellow card) 33'; Kaydalov 84'; Porokh (yellow card) 87'	Stadium: Chernihiv Arena; Attendance: 330

29 May 2026	Metalurh Zaporizhzhia	0–0	FC Chernihiv	Zaporizhzhia
15:30 EEST (UTC+03:00)	Bandurin (yellow card) 64'; Sitalo (yellow card) 82'; Kirichenko (yellow card) 90+4'	Report	Zenchenko (yellow card) 87'; Kartushov (yellow card) 89'	Stadium: Slavutych-Arena; Attendance: 50

1 June 2026 31	Ahrobiznes Volochysk	1–0	FC Chernihiv	Volochysk
15:30 EEST (UTC+03:00)	Tolochko 29'; Len (yellow card) 63'; Kuzmyn (yellow card) 68'	Report	Zenchenko (yellow card) 43'; Porokhnya (yellow card) 39' (yellow-red card) 40'	Stadium: Yunist Stadium; Attendance: 150

=== Ukrainian Cup ===
25 August 2025 Round of 64 (1/32)	Atlet Kyiv	0–1	Chernihiv	Kyiv
EEST (UTC+3)	Kramarenko (red card) 33'; Danylenko (yellow card) 46'; Stepanov (yellow card) 90+1'	Report	Shushko 51'; Shushko (yellow card) 52'; Fatyeyev (yellow card) 86'; Koydan (yellow card) 88'; Bezghubchenko (yellow card) 90+4'	Stadium: Atlet Stadium; Referee: M.Lypko (Ivano-Frankivsk)

17 September 2025 Round of 32 (1/16)	Chernihiv	(3 – 0) (Note: Administrative score. The original score 1–1 (1–3 p) was annulled on the decision of the UAF Control and Disciplinary Committee.) (1–3 p)	Kryvbas Kryvyi Rih	Chernihiv
EEST (UTC+3)	Koydan 47' (pen.) (Note: In official UAF report Myronenko scored on 48th minute, not from the penalty spot.)	Report	Tverdokhlib 45+1' (pen.) (Note: In official UAF report Tverdokhlib scored on 5th minute.)	Stadium: Chernihiv Arena; Attendance: 180; Referee: Volodymyr Novokhatniy (Cherkasy)
	Penalties
	Novikov (penalty scored); Bybik (Note: as Babik in the UAF official report) (penalty missed); Kartushov (penalty missed); Sakhno (penalty missed)		(penalty scored) Tverdokhlib; (penalty missed) Shevchenko; (penalty scored) Mendoza; (penalty scored) Paraco

28 October 2025 Round of 16 (1/8)	Chernihiv	1–1 (4–3 p)	Lisne	Chernihiv
EEST (UTC+3)	Shushko (yellow card) 11'; Shumylo (yellow card) 36'; Bybik (yellow card) 37'; Romanchenko 77' (pen.); Tatarenko (yellow card) 89'; Stolyarchuk (yellow card) 90'	Report	Rybalka 90+3' (pen.)	Stadium: Chernihiv Arena; Attendance: 210; Referee: Gyorgy Nazariy
	Penalties
	Romanchenko (penalty missed); ̈Porokhnya (penalty scored); ̈Shumylo (penalty scored); ̈Chaban (penalty scored); ̈Novikov (penalty scored)		̈Voloshyn (penalty missed); ̈Harmash (penalty scored); ̈Rybalka (penalty scored); ̈Kovalenko (penalty scored); ̈Hryshchenko (penalty missed)

18 March 2026 Round of 8 (1/4)	Chernihiv	0–0 (5–4 p)	Feniks-Mariupol	Chernihiv
EEST (UTC+3)		Report		Stadium: Chernihiv Arena; Attendance: 300; Referee: K.V. Zabroda (Kyiv)
	Penalties
	̈Shapoval (penalty scored); Novikov (penalty missed); ̈Teplyakov (penalty scored); ̈Shalfeyev (penalty scored); Romanchenko (penalty scored); ̈Shumylo (penalty scored)		̈Remenyak (penalty scored); Radchenko (penalty scored); ̈Sydorenko (penalty missed); ̈Balaba (penalty scored); Bohdanov (penalty scored); ̈Horin (penalty missed)

22 April 2026 Semi-finals (1/2)	Metalist 1925 Kharkiv	0–0 (5–6 p)	Chernihiv	Zhytomyr
EEST (UTC+3)		Report	Shushko (red card) 5'; Myronenko (yellow card) 66'	Stadium: Tsentralnyi Stadion; Attendance: 526; Referee: V.Romanov (Dnipro)
	Penalties
	Kalyuzhnyi (penalty scored); Antyukh (penalty scored); Baptistella (penalty scored); Arevalo (penalty missed); Moura (penalty scored); Pavlyuk (penalty scored); Mba (penalty missed)		(penalty scored) Shapoval; (penalty scored) Shalfeyev; (penalty scored) Teplyakov; (penalty missed) Porokhnya; (penalty scored) Romanchenko; (penalty scored) Bezghubchenko; (penalty scored) Zenchenko

20 May 2026 Final	Chernihiv	1–3	Dynamo Kyiv	Lviv
EEST (UTC+3)	Kartushov (yellow card) 23'; Romanchenko 34'; Halstyan (yellow card) 60'; Koydan (yellow card) 84'	Report	Buyalskyi 26', 53'; Yarmolenko 70'	Stadium: Arena Lviv; Attendance: 4,889; Referee: Oleksandr Shandor (Lviv)

== Statistics ==
=== Appearances and goals ===
No.	Pos	Nat	Player	Total		Ukrainian First League		Ukrainian Cup		Play-offs	
No.	Pos	Nat	Player	Apps	Goals	Apps	Goals	Apps	Goals	Apps	Goals
Goalkeepers
22	GK	(Ukraine) UKR	Oleksandr Roshchynskyi	0	0	0	0	0	0	0	0
35	GK	(Ukraine) UKR	Maksym Tatarenko	36	0	30	0	6	0	0	0
99	GK	(Ukraine) UKR	Denys Herasymenko	0	0	0	0	0	0	0	0
Defenders
2	DF	(Armenia) ARM	Eduard Halstyan	19	0	17	0	2	0	0	0
3	DF	(Ukraine) UKR	Maksym Shumylo	20	0	16	0	4	0	0	0
20	DF	(Ukraine) UKR	Dmytro Fatyeyev	26	1	23	1	3	0	0	0
23	DF	(Ukraine) UKR	Oleksiy Zenchenko	27	1	21	1	6	0	0	0
30	DF	(Ukraine) UKR	Mykyta Teplyakov	11	0	9	0	2	0	0	0
38	DF	(Ukraine) UKR	Pavlo Shushko	27	1	22	0	5	1	0	0
80	DF	(Ukraine) UKR	Nikita Terrekhovets	0	0	0	0	0	0	0	0
95	DF	(Ukraine) UKR	Vladyslav Shapoval	8	0	6	0	2	0	0	0
Midfielders
6	MF	(Ukraine) UKR	Yehor Shalfeyev	33	2	28	2	5	0	0	0
7	MF	(Ukraine) UKR	Dmytro Myronenko	29	1	25	1	4	0	0	0
8	MF	(Ukraine) UKR	Artur Bybik	36	0	30	0	6	0	0	0
10	MF	(Ukraine) UKR	Vyacheslav Koydan	26	6	21	5	5	1	0	0
12	MF	(Ukraine) UKR	Yehor Kartushov	36	0	30	0	6	0	0	0
13	MF	(Ukraine) UKR	Dzhilindo Bezghubchenko	36	3	30	3	6	0	0	0
17	MF	(Ukraine) UKR	Vladyslav Chaban	10	1	8	1	2	0	0	0
19	MF	(Ukraine) UKR	Nikita Dorosh	2	0	2	0	0	0	0	0
24	MF	(Ukraine) UKR	Dmytro Didok	3	0	2	0	1	0	0	0
33	MF	(Ukraine) UKR	Andriy Porokhnya	28	1	23	1	5	0	0	0
55	MF	(Ukraine) UKR	Anatoliy Romanchenko	32	3	27	1	5	2	0	0
77	MF	(Ukraine) UKR	Maksym Serdyuk	26	2	22	2	4	0	0	0
88	MF	(Ukraine) UKR	Andriy Stolyarchuk	22	2	18	2	4	0	0	0
Forwards
9	FW	(Ukraine) UKR	Dmytro Kulyk	18	1	15	1	3	0	0	0
11	FW	(Ukraine) UKR	Andriy Novikov	24	6	20	6	4	0	0	0
21	FW	(Ukraine) UKR	Denys Bezborodko	16	3	13	3	3	0	0	0
25	FW	(Ukraine) UKR	Daniil Volskyi	8	0	8	0	0	0	0	0
69	FW	(Ukraine) UKR	Ilya Yevchenko	0	0	0	0	0	0	0	0
Players transferred out during the season
14	MF	(Ukraine) UKR	Dmytro Sakhno	5	0	3	0	2	0	0	0
19	MF	(Ukraine) UKR	Nikita Posmashnyi	0	0	0	0	0	0	0	0
21	MF	(Ukraine) UKR	Vladyslav Shkolnyi	0	0	0	0	0	0	0	0

Source: Competitions

Last updated: 1 June 2026

=== Goalscorers ===
Rank	No.	Pos	Nat	Name	Second League	Cup	Play-offs	Total
1	17	FW	(Ukraine)	Andriy Novikov	6	0	0	6
2	10	MF	(Ukraine)	Vyacheslav Koydan	5	1	0	6
3	13	MF	(Ukraine)	Dzhilindo Bezghubchenko	3	0	0	3
4	21	FW	(Ukraine)	Denys Bezborodko	3	0	0	3
5	55	MF	(Ukraine)	Anatoliy Romanchenko	1	2	0	3
5	88	MF	(Ukraine)	Andriy Stolyarchuk	2	0	0	2
7	77	MF	(Ukraine)	Maksym Serdyuk	2	0	0	2
8	6	MF	(Ukraine)	Yehor Shalfeyev	2	0	0	2
9	9	FW	(Ukraine)	Dmytro Kulyk	1	0	0	1
10	33	MF	(Ukraine)	Andriy Porokhnya	1	0	0	1
11	17	MF	(Ukraine)	Vladyslav Chaban	1	0	0	1
12	7	MF	(Ukraine)	Dmytro Myronenko	1	0	0	1
13	20	DF	(Ukraine)	Dmytro Fatyeyev	1	0	0	1
14	23	DF	(Ukraine)	Oleksiy Zenchenko	1	0	0	1
15	38	DF	(Ukraine)	Pavlo Shushko	0	1	0	1
				Total	29	4	0	32

Last updated: 26 May 2026

=== Clean sheets ===
Rank	No.	Pos	Nat	Name	First League	Cup	Play-offs	Total
1	35	GK	(Ukraine)	Maksym Tatarenko	10	4	0	14
				Total	10	4	0	14

Last updated: 29 May 2026

=== Disciplinary record ===
No.	Pos	Nat	Player	First League			Ukrainian Cup			Play-offs			Total		
No.	Pos	Nat	Player	Yellow card	(yellow card) (yellow-red card)	Red card	Yellow card	(yellow card) (yellow-red card)	Red card	Yellow card	(yellow card) (yellow-red card)	Red card	Yellow card	(yellow card) (yellow-red card)	Red card
6	MF	(Ukraine)	Yehor Shalfyeyev	8	0	0	1	0	0	0	0	0	9	0	0
55	DF	(Ukraine)	Anatoliy Romanchenko	6	0	0	0	0	0	0	0	0	6	0	0
38	DF	(Ukraine)	Pavlo Shushko	5	0	0	2	0	1	0	0	0	7	0	1
13	MF	(Ukraine)	Oleksiy Zenchenko	5	1	0	0	0	0	0	0	0	5	1	0
33	MF	(Ukraine)	Andriy Porokhnya	5	1	0	0	0	0	0	0	0	5	1	0
77	MF	(Ukraine)	Maksym Serdyuk	4	0	0	1	0	0	0	0	0	5	0	0
3	DF	(Ukraine)	Maksym Shumylo	4	0	0	1	0	0	0	0	0	5	0	0
7	MF	(Ukraine)	Dmytro Myronenko	4	0	0	1	0	0	0	0	0	5	0	0
10	MF	(Ukraine)	Vyacheslav Koydan	3	0	0	2	0	0	0	0	0	5	0	0
20	DF	(Ukraine)	Dmytro Fatyeyev	3	0	0	1	0	0	0	0	0	4	0	0
8	MF	(Ukraine)	Artur Bybik	3	0	0	1	0	0	0	0	0	4	0	0
35	GK	(Ukraine)	Maksym Tatarenko	3	0	0	1	0	0	0	0	0	4	0	0
2	DF	(Armenia)	Eduard Halstyan	3	0	0	1	0	0	0	0	0	4	0	0
12	MF	(Ukraine)	Yehor Kartushov	2	0	1	0	0	0	0	0	0	3	0	0
11	FW	(Ukraine)	Andriy Novikov	2	0	0	0	0	0	0	0	0	2	0	0
13	MF	(Ukraine)	Dzhilindo Bezghubchenko	1	0	0	1	0	0	0	0	0	2	0	0
88	MF	(Ukraine)	Andriy Stolyarchuk	1	0	0	1	0	0	0	0	0	2	0	0
9	FW	(Ukraine)	Dmytro Kulyk	1	0	0	0	0	0	0	0	0	1	0	0
25	FW	(Ukraine)	Daniil Volskyi	1	0	0	0	0	0	0	0	0	1	0	0
24	MF	(Ukraine)	Dmytro Didok	1	0	0	0	0	0	0	0	0	1	0	0
14	DF	(Ukraine)	Dmytro Sakhno	1	0	0	0	0	0	0	0	0	1	0	0
95	DF	(Ukraine)	Vladyslav Shapoval	1	0	0	0	0	0	0	0	0	1	0	0
30	DF	(Ukraine)	Mykyta Teplyakov	1	0	0	0	0	0	0	0	0	1	0	0
			Total	67	2	0	15	0	1	0	0	0	82	2	1

Last updated: 1 June 2026
