= Andriy Stolyarchuk =

Ukrainian footballer

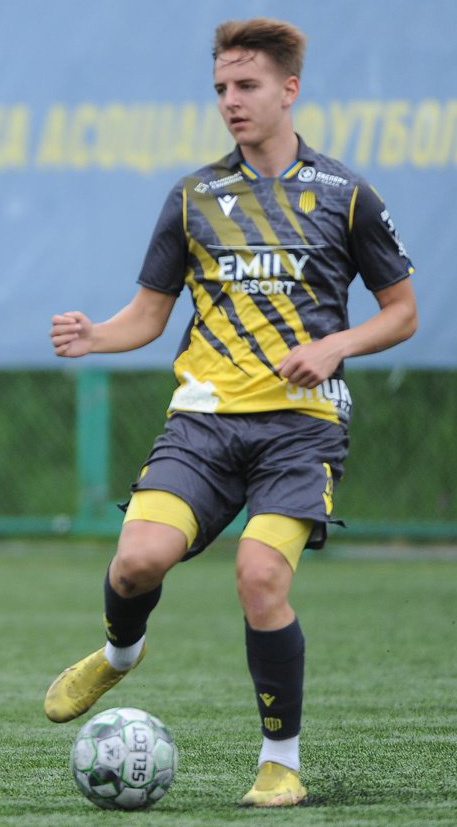
- Andriy Stolyarchuk playing for Rukh-2 Lviv in 2023

Personal information
- Full name: Andriy Yaroslavovych Stolyarchuk
- Date of birth: 4 July 2004 (age 22)
- Place of birth: Lviv, Ukraine
- Height: 1.75 m (5 ft 9 in)
- Position: Midfielder

Youth career
- 2013–2020: Karpaty Lviv
- 2020–2022: Rukh Lviv

Senior career*
Years	Team	Apps	(Gls)
2022–2025	Rukh Lviv	2	(0)
2023–2024	→ Rukh-2 Lviv (loan)	8	(1)
2024	→ Podillya Khmelnytskyi (loan)	10	(0)
2025–2026	Chernihiv	18	(2)
- * Club domestic league appearances and goals as of 26 May 2026

Andriy Yaroslavovych Stolyarchuk (Ukrainian: Андрій Ярославович Столярчук; born 4 July 2004) is a Ukrainian professional footballer who plays as a midfielder.

== Club career ==
=== Early career ===
Born in Lviv, Stolyarchuk began his career in the local Karpaty Lviv, where his first coach was Vitaliy Ponomaryov. Then he continued in the Rukh Lviv academy.

=== Rukh Lviv ===
In September 2020 he signed a contract with the Ukrainian Premier League side Rukh Lviv. He made his debut in the Ukrainian Premier League on 24 April 2023 in an away match against Dnipro-1. In March 2025 his contract with the club was expired. On 23 August 2023 he scored in Ukrainian Cup against Skala 1911 Stryi at the Sokil Stadium in Stryi.

==== Rukh-2 Lviv (loan) ====
In 2023 he moved on loan to Rukh-2 Lviv in the Ukrainian Second League. On 19 May 2024 he scored against Druzhba Myrivka.

==== Podillya Khmelnytskyi (loan) ====
On 9 September 2024, Stolyarchuk was loaned to Podillya Khmelnytskyi until the end of 2024. On 11 September 2024 he made his debut with the new club in Ukrainian First League against Ahrobiznes Volochysk.

=== FC Chernihiv ===
On 30 July 2025, he signed for Chernihiv in Ukrainian First League. On 9 August, he made his debut with his new club against Viktoriya Sumy at the Chernihiv Arena, replacing Andriy Porokhnya. On 9 December 2025, he scored his first goal in Ukrainian First League, against Probiy Horodenka at the Chernihiv Arena. On 8 April 2026, he scored against Metalist Kharkiv at the Avanhard Stadium in Uzhhorod. On 20 May 2026, he was included in the line up of the 2026 Ukrainian Cup final against Dynamo Kyiv at the Arena Lviv in Lviv. On 26 June 2026 his contract was ended and he was released by the club. In September 2026, together with other 17 players of FC Chernihiv, Andriy received and Honoured Master of Sport of Ukraine for the team’s performance in the Ukrainian Cup of the 2025/26 season.

== Career statistics ==
=== Club ===
As of match played 26 May 2026

Appearances and goals by club, season and competition
Club	Season	League			Cup		Europe		Other		Total	
Club	Season	Division	Apps	Goals	Apps	Goals	Apps	Goals	Apps	Goals	Apps	Goals
Rukh Lviv	2022–23	Ukrainian Premier League	2	0	0	0	0	0	0	0	2	0
Rukh Lviv	2023–24	Ukrainian Premier League	0	0	1	1	0	0	0	0	1	1
Rukh-2 Lviv (loan)	2023–24	Ukrainian Second League	8	1	0	0	0	0	0	0	8	1
Podillya Khmelnytskyi (loan)	2024–25	Ukrainian First League	10	0	0	0	0	0	0	0	10	0
Chernihiv	2025–26	Ukrainian First League	18	2	4	0	0	0	0	0	22	2
Career total			38	3	5	1	0	0	0	0	43	4

== Honours ==
Chernihiv

- Ukrainian Cup runner-up: 2025–26

Individual

- Honoured Master of Sport of Ukraine
