= Andriy Novikov =

Ukrainian footballer (born 1999)

Personal information
- Full name: Andriy Vasylyovych Novikov
- Date of birth: 20 April 1999 (age 27)
- Place of birth: Mankivka, Ukraine
- Height: 1.83 m (6 ft 0 in)
- Position: Striker

Team information
- Current team: Chernihiv
- Number: 11

Youth career
- 2011–2012: Youth Sportive School Mankivka
- 2012–2016: Piddubny Olympic College

Senior career*
Years	Team	Apps	(Gls)
2017–2018	Volyn Lutsk	3	(0)
2018–2019	Zorya Luhansk	0	(0)
2019–2022	Oleksandriya	12	(1)
2022	LNZ Cherkasy	0	(0)
2022	Kjellerup	1	(0)
2022–2023	Esbjerg fB	7	(0)
2023–2025	Dinaz Vyshhorod	37	(7)
2025–	Chernihiv	34	(11)
- * Club domestic league appearances and goals as of 21 November 2026

Andriy Vasylyovych Novikov (Ukrainian: Андрій Васильович Новіков; born 20 April 1999) is a Ukrainian professional footballer who plays as a striker for Chernihiv.

== Career ==
=== Oleksandriya ===
In July 2019, he signed with Ukrainian Premier League club FC Oleksandriya and made his debut on 14 February 2021 against FC Mariupol.

Due to the Russo-Ukrainian War, which escalated in late February 2022, Novikov terminated his contract with LNZ Cherkasy, and on 5 April 2022 he joined Denmark Series club Kjellerup IF. However, 20 days later, he left the club again. On 3 August, Novikov signed with newly relegated Danish 2nd Division side Esbjerg fB. Novikov left the club again at the end of the season.

=== Dinaz Vyshhorod ===
In 2023 he moved to Dinaz Vyshhorod in the Ukrainian Premier League for two seasons. In December 2024 his contract with the club was ended.

=== FC Chernihiv ===
On 31 January 2025 he signed for Chernihiv in Ukrainian Second League. On 11 April 2025, his scored his first goal with the new club against Lokomotyv Kyiv at the Bannikov Stadium in Kyiv. On 4 June 2025, he scored the winning goal in the second leg of the Play-Offs against Skala Stryi at the Sokil Stadium. On 24 June 2026, he extended his contract with the club for three years.

== Career statistics ==
=== Club ===
As of match played 29 October 2026

Appearances and goals by club, season and competition
Club	Season	League			Cup		Europe		Other		Total	
Club	Season	Division	Apps	Goals	Apps	Goals	Apps	Goals	Apps	Goals	Apps	Goals
Volyn Lutsk	2017–18	Ukrainian First League	3	0	1	0	0	0	0	0	4	0
Oleksandriya	2019–20	Ukrainian Premier League	0	0	1	0	0	0	0	0	1	0
Oleksandriya	2020–21	Ukrainian Premier League	9	1	0	0	0	0	0	0	9	1
Oleksandriya	2021–22	Ukrainian Premier League	3	0	1	0	0	0	0	0	4	0
LNZ Cherkasy	2021–22	Ukrainian Second League	0	0	0	0	0	0	0	0	0	0
Kjellerup	2022–23	Danish 2nd Division	1	0	0	0	0	0	0	0	1	0
Esbjerg	2022–23	Danish 2nd Division	7	0	0	0	0	0	0	0	7	0
Dinaz Vyshhorod	2023–24	Ukrainian First League	25	5	1	0	0	0	0	0	26	5
Dinaz Vyshhorod	2024–25	Ukrainian First League	15	2	1	0	0	0	0	0	16	2
Chernihiv	2024–25	Ukrainian Second League	6	3	0	0	0	0	4	1	10	4
Chernihiv	2025–26	Ukrainian First League	20	6	4	0	0	0	0	0	24	6
Chernihiv	2026–27	Ukrainian First League	8	2	3	2	0	0	0	0	11	4
Career total			97	19	12	2	0	0	4	1	114	22

== Honours ==
Chernihiv

- Ukrainian Cup runner-up: 2025–26

=== Individual ===
- SportArena Player of the Round: 2025-26 (Round 20)
- Honoured Master of Sport of Ukraine
