= Yehor Shalfyeyev =

Ukrainian footballer (born 1998)

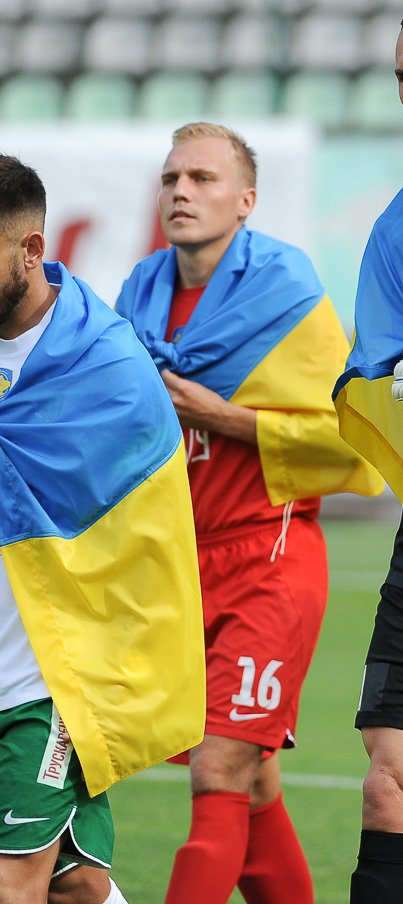

Personal information
- Full name: Yehor Pavlovych Shalfyeyev
- Date of birth: 3 October 1998 (age 28)
- Place of birth: Zaporizhzhia, Ukraine
- Height: 1.78 m (5 ft 10 in)
- Position: Midfielder

Team information
- Current team: Chernihiv
- Number: 6

Youth career
- 2011–2015: Metalurh Zaporizhzhia

Senior career*
Years	Team	Apps	(Gls)
2016–2021	Zorya Luhansk	1	(0)
2019–2020	→ Metalurh Zaporizhzhia (loan)	9	(1)
2020–2021	→ Metalurh Zaporizhzhia (loan)	21	(1)
2021–2023	Metalurh Zaporizhzhia	40	(6)
2023–2024	Nyva Buzova	17	(0)
2024	Bukovyna Chernivtsi	7	(0)
2024–2025	Mynai	12	(0)
2025–	Chernihiv	47	(4)
- * Club domestic league appearances and goals as of 21 November 2026

Yehor Pavlovych Shalfyeyev (Ukrainian: Єгор Павлович Шалфєєв; born 3 October 1998) is a Ukrainian professional footballer who plays as a midfielder for Chernihiv in the Ukrainian Second League.

== Career ==
Shalfyeyev is a product of Metalurh Zaporizhzhia academy.

=== Zorya Luhansk ===
In 2016 he moved to Zorya Luhansk playing for the reserve team. He made his debut as a substituted player in a second half-time for Zorya Luhansk in the losing match against Dynamo Kyiv on 7 April 2018 in the Ukrainian Premier League.

=== Metalurh Zaporizhzhia ===
In January 2020 he was loaned to Metalurh Zaporizhzhia. On 3 August 2020 he scored his first goal in Ukrainian First League against Prykarpattia Ivano-Frankivsk at the Kniazha Arena in Shchaslyve. On 18 August 2020 he made his debut in Ukrainian Cup against Alians Lypova Dolyna at the Slavutych-Arena in Zaporizhzhia.

=== Nyva Buzova ===
In summer 2023 his contract with the club was terminated and it wasn't extended and in July 2023 he signed a contract with Nyva Buzova just promoted in Ukrainian First League. On 18 August, he made his debut against Karpaty Lviv at the Ukraina Stadium in Lviv.

=== Bukovyna Chernivtsi ===
In January 2024, he moved to Bukovyna Chernivtsi in the Ukrainian First League. Here he stayed until the end of the season, where he played 7 matches.

=== Mynai ===
In summer 2024, he signed for Mynai in the Ukrainian First League, making 12 appearances.

=== FC Chernihiv ===
On 25 January 2025, he moved to Chernihiv in Ukrainian Second League. On 11 April 2025, he made his debut with the new club against Lokomotyv Kyiv at the Bannikov Stadium in Kyiv. On 11 May 2025, he scored his first goal with the new club against Oleksandriya-2 at the Olimp Stadium. On 8 June 2025, he scored in the first leg of the Play-Offs against Metalurh Zaporizhzhia at the Chernihiv Arena. On 13 October he scored for the first time with FC Chernihiv in Ukrainian First League, in a 2–0 win with UCSA Tarasivka. On 15 February 2026, he signed a new contract extension with FC Chernihiv. On 22 April 2026, he reached the final of the Ukrainian Cup, after FC Chernihiv beat Metalist 1925 Kharkiv on penalties. On 23 August 2026, he scored his first goal in Ukrainian Cup against LSTM 536 Lutsk.

== Career statistics ==
=== Club ===
As of match played 21 November 2026

Appearances and goals by club, season and competition
Club	Season	League			Cup		Europe		Other		Total	
Club	Season	Division	Apps	Goals	Apps	Goals	Apps	Goals	Apps	Goals	Apps	Goals
Zorya Luhansk	2017–18	Ukrainian Premier League	1	0	0	0	0	0	0	0	1	0
Zorya Luhansk	2020–21	Ukrainian Premier League	0	0	0	0	0	0	0	0	0	0
Metalurh Zaporizhzhia (loan)	2019–20	Ukrainian First League	9	1	2	0	0	0	0	0	11	1
Metalurh Zaporizhzhia (loan)	2020–21	Ukrainian First League	21	1	0	0	0	0	0	0	21	1
Metalurh Zaporizhzhia	2021–22	Ukrainian First League	19	4	2	0	0	0	0	0	21	4
Metalurh Zaporizhzhia	2022–23	Ukrainian First League	21	2	2	0	0	0	0	0	23	2
Niva Buzova	2023–24	Ukrainian First League	17	0	1	0	0	0	0	0	18	0
Bukovyna Chernivtsi	2023–24	Ukrainian First League	7	0	0	0	0	0	0	0	17	0
Mynai	2024–25	Ukrainian First League	12	0	2	0	0	0	0	0	14	0
Chernihiv	2024–25	Ukrainian Second League	6	1	0	0	0	0	3	1	9	2
Chernihiv	2025–26	Ukrainian First League	28	2	5	0	0	0	0	0	33	2
Chernihiv	2026–27	Ukrainian First League	13	1	3	1	0	0	0	0	16	2
Career total			154	12	17	1	0	0	3	1	172	14

== Honours ==
Chernihiv

- Ukrainian Cup runner-up: 2025–26

Individual

- Honoured Master of Sport of Ukraine
