= Vladyslav Chaban =

Ukrainian footballer

Personal information
- Full name: Vladyslav Yuriiovych Chaban
- Date of birth: 21 January 2003 (age 23)
- Place of birth: Lviv, Ukraine
- Height: 1.82 m (6 ft 0 in)
- Position: Centre-back

Team information
- Current team: Podillya
- Number: 11

Youth career
- 2016–2020: Karpaty Lviv
- 2020–2021: Oleksandriya
- 2021–2022: Mynai
- 2022–2023: Inhulets Petrove

Senior career*
Years	Team	Apps	(Gls)
2023–2024	Inhulets Petrove	2	(0)
2023–2024	Khust	8	(4)
2024–2026	Inhulets Petrove	5	(0)
2025–2026	→ Chernihiv (loan)	9	(1)
2026–	Podillya Khmelnytskyi	13	(4)

International career
2017	Ukraine U17	5	(0)
- * Club domestic league appearances and goals as of 21 November 2026

Vladyslav Yuriiovych Chaban (Ukrainian: Владислав Юрійович Чабан; born 22 January 2003) is a Ukrainian professional footballer who plays as a centre-back for Podillya.

== Career ==
=== Early Career ===
He started his career at Karpaty Lviv before moving to Oleksandriya, Mynai.

=== Inhulets Petrove ===
In 2023, he signed for Inhulets Petrove and on 11 July 2023, he extend his contract with the club for three years, helping the club to win the Ukrainian First League.

=== Khust ===
In 2024 he moved to Khust and he made his debut for the club from the same city on 23 March 2024, in a 4-1 home win in the first knockout round of the Ukrainian First League against Metalurh Zaporizhzhia. Vladislav came on in the 46th minute in place of Denys Kurilets and scored his first professional goal in the 73rd minute. In March 2024, he was elected best player of the month.

=== Second spell at Inhulets Petrove ===
In early August 2024, he returned to Inhulets Petrove. He made his debut for the Petrovsk club on 10 August 2024, in a 0–0 away draw in the second round of the Ukrainian Premier League against Kolos Kovalivka. Chaban came on as a 90th-minute substitute for Roman Volokhaty.

==== Chernihiv ====
In summer 2025 he was loaned to Chernihiv in Ukrainian First League. On 17 September 2025 he made his debut with the new club in Ukrainian Cup against Kryvbas Kryvyi Rih at the Chernihiv Arena. On 2 November 2025 he scored his first goal wit the new club against Inhulets Petrove at the Inhulets Stadium. On 22 May 2026, he was selected in the lineup for the 2026 Ukrainian Cup final, where the first half ended 1-1 and at the end of the second half Dynamo Kyiv won 1-3. He played 11 games for the Chernihiv club, scoring one goal. On 26 June 2026 his loan was ended and he was released by the club.

=== Podillya Khmelnytskyi ===
In August 2026, he signed for Podillya in Ukrainian Second League. On 8 August 2026, he made his debut against Nyva Vinnytsia at the Sport Complex Podillia in Khmelnytskyi.

== Career statistics ==
=== Club ===
As of match played 21 November 2026

Appearances and goals by club, season and competition
Club	Season	League			Cup		Europe		Other		Total	
Club	Season	Division	Apps	Goals	Apps	Goals	Apps	Goals	Apps	Goals	Apps	Goals
Inhulets Petrove	2023–24	Ukrainian First League	2	0	2	0	0	0	0	0	4	0
Khust	2023–24	Ukrainian First League	8	4	0	0	0	0	2	0	10	4
Inhulets Petrove	2024–25	Ukrainian Premier League	5	0	1	0	0	0	0	0	6	0
Inhulets Petrove	2025–26	Ukrainian First League	0	0	1	0	0	0	0	0	1	0
Chernihiv (Loan)	2025–26	Ukrainian First League	9	1	3	0	0	0	0	0	12	1
Podillya	2026–27	Ukrainian Second League	13	4	1	0	0	0	0	0	14	4
Career total			37	9	8	0	0	0	2	0	47	9

== Honours ==
Inhulets Petrove

- Ukrainian First Leagueː 2023–24

Chernihiv

- Ukrainian Cup runner-up: 2025–26

=== Individual ===
- Ukrainian First League Player of the Month: March 2024
