= Vyacheslav Koydan =

Ukrainian footballer (born 1994)

Personal information
- Full name: Vyacheslav Stanislavovych Koydan
- Date of birth: 5 June 1994 (age 32)
- Place of birth: Chernihiv, Ukraine
- Height: 1.85 m (6 ft 1 in)
- Position: Defensive midfielder

Team information
- Current team: Chernihiv
- Number: 10

Youth career
- 2010: Yunist Chernihiv

Senior career*
Years	Team	Apps	(Gls)
2013–2014	UkrAhroKom Holovkivka	10	(0)
2014–2015	Oleksandriya	1	(0)
2015–2017	Sumy	22	(4)
2017	Härnösand	19	(9)
2018–2020	Sandviken	71	(8)
2021	Chernihiv	10	(3)
2021–2022	Olimpik Donetsk	7	(0)
2022–	Chernihiv	88	(16)
- * Club domestic league appearances and goals as of 21 November 2026

Vyacheslav Stanislavovych Koydan (Ukrainian: В'ячеслав Станіславович Койдан; born 5 July 1994) is a Ukrainian professional footballer who plays as a defensive midfielder for Chernihiv.

== Career ==
He started his career at Yunist Chernihiv before moving to Dynamo Kyiv and bouncing around several amateur clubs between 2006 and 2013. In 2013 he signed with FC Chernihiv, where he played 22 games. He also played for UkrAhroKom Holovkivka and Oleksandriya before signing with Sumy in 2015. In 2017 he moved to Sandviken in the Swedish Division 1.

=== Chernihiv ===
In 2021 he moved to FC Chernihiv in the Ukrainian Second League. On 27 March he made his debut with the new team against Rubikon Kyiv at the Chernihiv Arena. On 18 April he scored his first goal by penalty against Obolon-2 at the Chernihiv Arena.

=== Olimpik Donetsk ===
In summer 2021 he moved to Olimpik Donetsk in Ukrainian First League. On 25 July he played his first match with the new club against Kryvbas Kryvyi Rih, replacing Yuriy Hlushchuk in the 46th minute. On 18 August he played in the 2021–22 Ukrainian Cup against Livyi Bereh Kyiv. On 31 August he played in the next round against LNZ Cherkasy.

=== Second spell at FC Chernihiv ===
In January 2022 he signed with FC Chernihiv. On 22 August, following the club's promotion to the Ukrainian First League, he extended his contract with FC Chernihiv. On 2 August 2023, he scored against Livyi Bereh Kyiv in Ukrainian Cup at the Yunist Stadium in Chernihiv. 9 August, he scored twice against Metalist 1925-2 Kharkiv at the Yunist Stadium in Chernihiv. On 12 August, he was included in the Best XI of Round 1 of the 2024–25 Ukrainian Second League. On 30 May 2025, he scored in the first leg of the third place Play-Offs against Skala Stryi at the Chernihiv Arena. On 12 June 2025, he scored the winning goal in the second leg of Ukrainian First League promotion Play-Offs against Metalurh Zaporizhzhia at the Slavutych-Arena. On 27 June 2025, due to his performance, his contract with the club was extended. On 17 August, he scored three goals against Prykarpattia Ivano-Frankivsk at the MCS Rukh in Ivano-Frankivsk. On 17 September 2025 he scored in Ukrainian Cup against Kryvbas Kryvyi at the Chernihiv Arena.

== Career statistics ==
=== Club ===
As of match played 21 November 2026

Appearances and goals by club, season and competition
Club	Season	League			Cup		Europe		Other		Total	
Club	Season	Division	Apps	Goals	Apps	Goals	Apps	Goals	Apps	Goals	Apps	Goals
Retro Vatutine	2011–12	Ukrainian Premier League	7	1	0	0	0	0	0	0	7	1
YuSB Chernihiv	2013	Ukrainian Football Amateur League	23	7	0	0	0	0	0	0	23	7
Holovkivka	2013–14	Ukrainian First League	10	0	0	0	0	0	0	0	10	0
Oleksandriya	2014–15	Ukrainian First League	1	0	0	0	0	0	0	0	1	0
Sumy	2015–16	Ukrainian First League	10	4	0	0	0	0	0	0	10	4
Sumy	2016–17	Ukrainian First League	12	1	1	0	0	0	0	0	13	1
Härnösand	2017	Division 2	0	0	2	1	0	0	0	0	2	1
Sandviken	2018	Ettan Fotboll	29	5	2	0	0	0	0	0	31	5
Sandviken	2019	Ettan Fotboll	12	1	1	0	0	0	0	0	13	1
Sandviken	2020	Ettan Fotboll	30	2	5	2	0	0	0	0	35	4
Sandviken	2021	Ettan Fotboll	0	0	2	0	0	0	0	0	2	0
Chernihiv	2020–21	Ukrainian Second League	10	3	0	0	0	0	0	0	10	3
Olimpik Donetsk	2021–22	Ukrainian First League	7	0	2	0	0	0	0	0	9	0
Chernihiv	2022–23	Ukrainian First League	18	1	0	0	0	0	0	0	18	1
Chernihiv	2023–24	Ukrainian First League	26	4	1	1	0	0	0	0	27	5
Chernihiv	2024–25	Ukrainian Second League	15	5	2	0	0	0	4	2	21	7
Chernihiv	2025–26	Ukrainian First League	21	5	5	1	0	0	0	0	26	6
Chernihiv	2026–27	Ukrainian First League	9	1	2	0	0	0	0	0	11	1
Career total			240	40	24	5	0	0	4	2	270	47

== Honours ==
Oleksandriya

- Ukrainian First League: 2014–15

Chernihiv

- Ukrainian Cup runner-up: 2025–26

Individual

- Top Scorer of Chernihiv on the season 2024–25 (7 goals)
- Top Scorer of Chernihiv on the season 2020–21 (3 goals)
- Honoured Master of Sport of Ukraine
