= Pavlo Shushko =

Ukrainian footballer (born 2000)

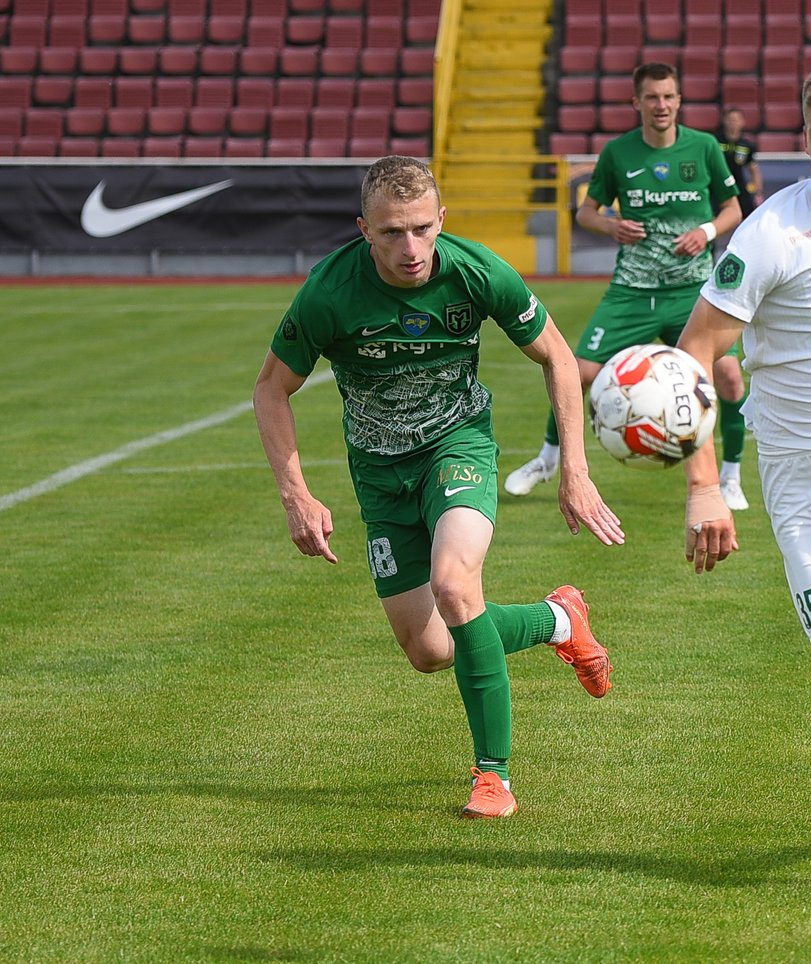

Personal information
- Full name: Pavlo Serhiyovych Shushko
- Date of birth: 7 May 2000 (age 26)
- Place of birth: Velyki Kopani, Ukraine
- Height: 1.82 m (6 ft 0 in)
- Position: Centre-back

Team information
- Current team: Chernihiv
- Number: 38

Youth career
- 2013: Atlet Kyiv
- 2013–2017: Shakhtar-3 Donetsk

Senior career*
Years	Team	Apps	(Gls)
2020–2022	Mariupol	1	(0)
2021–2022	→ Kramatorsk (loan)	11	(0)
2022–2024	Mariupol	42	(0)
2025–	Chernihiv	34	(2)

International career^{‡}
2017	Ukraine U17	5	(0)
- * Club domestic league appearances and goals as of 30 September 2026 ‡ National team caps and goals as of 19 October 2025

Pavlo Serhiyovych Shushko (Ukrainian: Павло Сергійович Шушко; born 7 May 2000) is a Ukrainian professional footballer who plays as a centre-back for Chernihiv in the Ukrainian Second League.

== Club career ==
=== Early career ===
Shushko played for Shakhtar Donetsk and FC Mariupol in the Ukrainian Premier League Reserves, making his debut for FC Mariupol in the Ukrainian Premier League as a second half-time substitute against Shakhtar Donetsk on 10 April 2021.

==== FC Kramatorsk (Loan) ====
In July, he was loaned to Kramatorsk in the Ukrainian First League.

=== FSC Mariupol ===
In 2022, he signed with Ukrainian First League club FSC Mariupol and made his debut on 26 November 2022 against Dinaz Vyshhorod.

=== FC Chernihiv ===
On 10 March 2025, he moved to Chernihiv in the Ukrainian Second League. On 11 April 2025, his scored his first goal with the new club against Lokomotyv Kyiv at the Bannikov Stadium in Kyiv. He made his contribution to get the club into the third place in the league and get promoted to Ukrainian First League. On 25 August 2025, he scored his first goal in Ukrainian Cup against Atlet Kyiv at the Atlet Stadium in Kyiv. On 15 February 2026, Pavlo signed a new contract extension with the club.

== International career ==
Shushko was called up by the Ukraine under-17, where he played five matches.

== Career statistics ==
=== Club ===
As of match played 6 October 2026

Appearances and goals by club, season and competition
Club	Season	League			Cup		Europe		Other		Total	
Club	Season	Division	Apps	Goals	Apps	Goals	Apps	Goals	Apps	Goals	Apps	Goals
FC Mariupol	2020–21	Ukrainian Premier League	1	0	0	0	0	0	0	0	1	0
Kramatorsk (Loan)	2021–22	Ukrainian First League	11	0	1	0	0	0	0	0	12	0
Mariupol	2022–23	Ukrainian First League	11	0	2	0	0	0	0	0	13	0
Mariupol	2023–24	Ukrainian First League	27	0	3	0	0	0	0	0	30	0
Mariupol	2024–25	Ukrainian First League	8	0	1	0	0	0	0	0	9	0
Chernihiv	2024–25	Ukrainian Second League	6	2	0	0	0	0	3	0	9	2
Chernihiv	2025–26	Ukrainian First League	22	0	5	1	0	0	0	0	27	1
Chernihiv	2026–27	Ukrainian First League	6	0	2	0	0	0	0	0	8	0
Career total			92	2	14	1	0	0	3	0	109	3

== Honours ==
Chernihiv

- Ukrainian Cup runner-up: 2025–26

Individual

- Honoured Master of Sport of Ukraine
