= Yehor Kartushov =

Ukrainian footballer (born 1991)

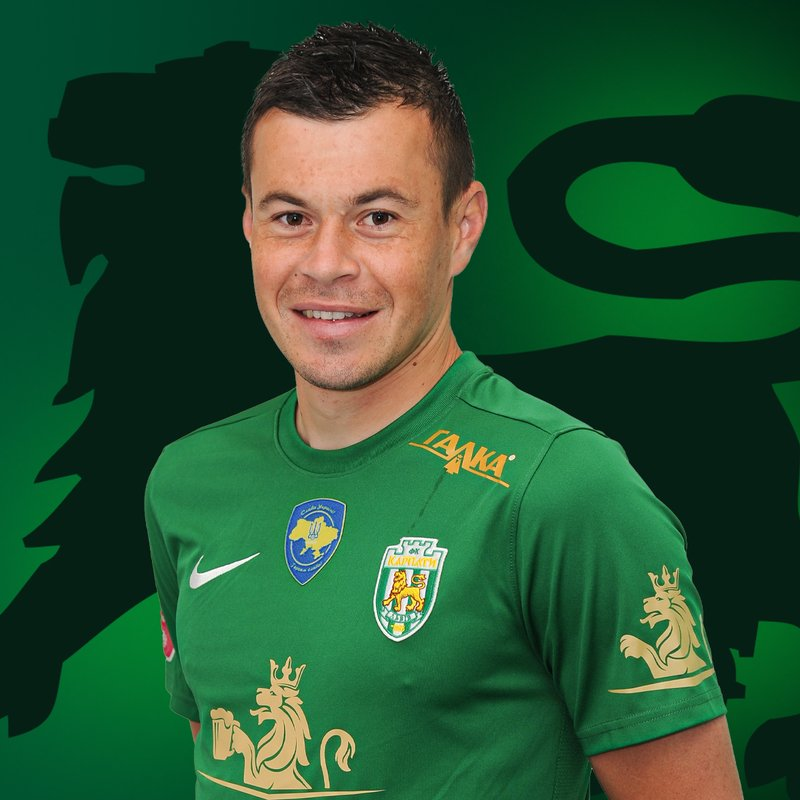

Personal information
- Full name: Yehor Oleksandrovych Kartushov
- Date of birth: 5 January 1991 (age 35)
- Place of birth: Saky, Ukrainian SSR, Soviet Union
- Height: 1.74 m (5 ft 9 in)
- Position: Midfielder

Team information
- Current team: Chernihiv
- Number: 12

Youth career
- 2004–2007: Shakhtar Donetsk

Senior career*
Years	Team	Apps	(Gls)
2007–2011	Shakhtar Donetsk	0	(0)
2007–2008	→ Shakhtar-3 Donetsk	10	(1)
2010	→ Zorya Luhansk (loan)	25	(0)
2011	→ Illichivets Mariupol (loan)	8	(0)
2011	Zorya Luhansk	0	(0)
2012–2022	Desna Chernihiv	244	(33)
2022–2023	Metalist Kharkiv	24	(1)
2023–2024	Karpaty Lviv	16	(1)
2024	Dinaz Vyshhorod	12	(0)
2025–	Chernihiv	49	(2)

International career^{‡}
2007	Ukraine U16	4	(2)
2007–2009	Ukraine U17	9	(1)
2008–2009	Ukraine U18	4	(1)
2008–2010	Ukraine U19	10	(0)
2011	Ukraine U21	4	(2)
- * Club domestic league appearances and goals as of 21 November 2026 ‡ National team caps and goals as of 22 December 2024

Yehor Oleksandrovych Kartushov (Ukrainian: Єгор Олександрович Картушов; born 5 January 1991) is a Ukrainian footballer who plays as a midfielder for Ukrainian Second League side Chernihiv.

== Club career ==
=== Desna Chernihiv ===
In 2012, Kartushov moved to Desna Chernihiv and in the 2012–13 season with Desna won the Second League title and rose in the class. Following the results of the championship of 2013–14 the team took the 5th position in the Ukrainian First League.

In the Ukrainian Cup in the season 2013–14, with Desna he reached the quarter-finals and according to the results of the 2017–18 season with his club, won the bronze medals of the First League and gained the right to compete in the Ukrainian Premier League through the play-offs against Zirka Kropyvnytskyi.

Yehor Kartushov with his team got into the quarterfinals of the Ukrainian Cup in the season 2017–18 against Dynamo Kyiv and in the same season he has been elected best player of the Round 6. Two seasons later in the season 2019–20, he got again into the quarterfinals of the Ukrainian Cup for the second time of the history of the club.

In February 2019, he signed a new contract with Desna Chernihiv In Ukrainian Premier League in the 2019–20 season, with Desna, he got the 4th place, through the play-offs for the Championship round table. Always in the 2019–20 season, contributing to achieve the 4th place in the Ukrainian Premier League and qualifying for the play-offs for the Championship round table and also into the quarterfinals of the Ukrainian Cup in season 2019–20.

On 30 May 2020, he scored during the play-offs against Kolos Kovalivka, allow Desna Chernihiv to win 2–0 away. On 28 June 2020, he scored against Dynamo Kyiv, where Desna won 3–2 in a fantastic game.

With the club of Chernihiv qualified for the first time in the history of the club for the Europa League third qualifying round. and been the second top assist in the League, together with Vladyslav Kocherhin and Júnior Moraes

He played in UEFA Europa League, in the team Desna Chernihiv against VfL Wolfsburg for the Europa League third qualifying round at the AOK Stadion.

On 13 December 2020, he scored a goal on the 2–0 victory against FC Mariupol in Kyiv at the NSC Olimpiyskiy thus celebrated the 100th match in the UPL. On 19 January 2021 he scored his first goal with the new team in the victory for 4–2 against Dinaz Vyshhorod in a friendly game. On 4 February 2021, he scored against Ahrobiznes in the friendly match ended 4-0 for Desna.

On 8 March 2021, he scored in Ukrainian Premier League in the season 2020–21 against Rukh Lviv at the Skif Stadium for away victory for 0–4.

On 1 May 2021, he scored against Kolos Kovalivka at the Chernihiv Stadium giving the 2–2 for the club of Chernihiv. On 11 July 2021 he extended his contract with the club for one more year and he has nominated captain of the team of Chernihiv. On 21 September 2021, he played against Metalist Kharkiv in Ukrainian Cup in the season 2021–22. On 11 February 2022, he was included in the team for the preparation in Turkey for the second half of the season. On 11 February 2022, he played in the match against Velež Mostar and on 17 February he played against Torpedo Kutaisi in two friendly match.

=== Metalist Kharkiv ===
On 18 February 2022, Kartushov after 10 years with the club of Chernihiv, he signed a 2.5-year contract with Metalist Kharkiv. On 25 June 2022 he played the first friendly match with the new club against Botev Plovdiv. On 1 July he played against İstanbul Başakşehir in a friendly match. On 7 July 2022, Kartushov, together with coach Oleksandr Kucher, left Metalist Kharkiv and joined the Dnipro-1 training camp and on 8 July he played in the friendly match against NK Čarda. On 14 July 2022, he played in the friendly match against Aris Limassol. On 15 April 2023 he scored his first goal with the new club against Veres Rivne.

=== FC Chernihiv ===
On 22 January 2025 he signed for Chernihiv in Ukrainian Second League. On 19 April 2025, his scored his first goal with the new club against Nyva Vinnytsia at the Chernihiv Arena in Chernihiv. On 13 November 2025, he signed a new contract extension with FC Chernihiv.

== International career ==
Kartushov was also a member of the Ukraine national under-21 football team.

== Outside of professional football ==
In March 2022, during the Siege of Chernihiv, Kartushov, together with other Desna's ex-players like Andriy Totovytskyi, Yevhen Selin, Vladyslav Kalitvintsev, Pylyp Budkivskyi, Ihor Lytovka, Andriy Dombrovskyi, Oleksandr Filippov, Levan Arveladze, Artem Favorov and Denys Favorov, transferred money for the civilian population of the city of Chernihiv.

== Career statistics ==
=== Club ===
As of match played 21 November 2026

Appearances and goals by club, season and competition
Club	Season	League			Cup		Europe		Other		Total	
Club	Season	Division	Apps	Goals	Apps	Goals	Apps	Goals	Apps	Goals	Apps	Goals
Zirka Kropyvnytskyi	2010–11	Ukrainian Premier League	13	0	3	0	0	0	0	0	15	0
Zirka Kropyvnytskyi	2011–12	Ukrainian Premier League	12	0	0	0	0	0	0	0	12	0
Mariupol	2010–11	Ukrainian Premier League	8	0	0	0	0	0	0	0	8	0
Desna Chernihiv	2012–13	Ukrainian Second League	16	0	0	0	0	0	0	0	16	0
Desna Chernihiv	2013–14	Ukrainian First League	26	6	4	2	0	0	0	0	30	8
Desna Chernihiv	2014–15	Ukrainian First League	29	8	1	0	0	0	0	0	30	8
Desna Chernihiv	2015–16	Ukrainian First League	19	4	0	0	0	0	0	0	19	4
Desna Chernihiv	2016–17	Ukrainian First League	34	4	3	0	0	0	0	0	37	4
Desna Chernihiv	2017–18	Ukrainian First League	25	4	4	2	0	0	0	0	29	6
Desna Chernihiv	2018–19	Ukrainian Premier League	35	3	2	0	0	0	0	0	37	3
Desna Chernihiv	2019–20	Ukrainian Premier League	40	3	2	2	0	0	0	0	42	5
Desna Chernihiv	2020–21	Ukrainian Premier League	23	3	1	0	1 (Note: one appearance in Europa League third qualifying round)	0	0	0	25	3
Desna Chernihiv	2021–22	Ukrainian Premier League	15	0	1	0	0	0	0	0	16	0
Metalist Kharkiv	2022–23	Ukrainian Premier League	24	1	0	0	0	0	0	0	24	1
Karpaty Lviv	2023–24	Ukrainian First League	16	1	0	0	0	0	0	0	16	1
Dinaz Vyshhorod	2024–25	Ukrainian First League	12	0	1	0	0	0	0	0	13	0
Chernihiv	2024–25	Ukrainian Second League	6	1	0	0	0	0	4	0	10	1
Chernihiv	2025–26	Ukrainian First League	30	0	6	0	0	0	0	0	36	0
Chernihiv	2026–27	Ukrainian First League	13	1	1	0	0	0	0	0	14	1
Career total			378	39	29	0	1	0	22	0	440	47

== Honours ==
Chernihiv

- Ukrainian Cup runner-up: 2025–26

Desna Chernihiv

- Ukrainian First League: 2017–18
- Ukrainian Second League: 2012–13

Shakhtar-3 Donetsk

- Ukrainian Premier League youth championship: 2008–09

Individual

- Desna Chernihiv Player of the Year: 2015
- Top Assist Ukrainian Premier League: Runner-up 2019-20 (8 Assists)
- Best Player of round 6 Ukrainian First League:2017–18 with FC Desna Chernihiv
- Honoured Master of Sport of Ukraine
