= Vitaliy Mykhayliv =

Ukrainian footballer

Personal information
- Full name: Vitaliy Romanovych Mykhayliv
- Date of birth: 11 October 2005 (age 21)
- Place of birth: Lviv, Ukraine
- Height: 1.65 m (5 ft 5 in)
- Position: Attacking midfielder

Team information
- Current team: Nyva Ternopil
- Number: 27

Youth career
- 2017–2022: Lviv

Senior career*
Years	Team	Apps	(Gls)
2022–2023	Lviv	12	(0)
2023–2024	Mynai	0	(0)
2024–	Nyva Ternopil	30	(2)

International career^{‡}
2023	Ukraine U19	5	(0)
- * Club domestic league appearances and goals as of 4 June 2026 ‡ National team caps and goals as of 20 November 2024

Vitaliy Romanovych Mykhayliv (Ukrainian: Віталій Романович Михайлів; born 11 October 2005) is a Ukrainian professional footballer who plays as an attacking midfielder for Nyva Ternopil.

== Career ==
Born in Lviv, Mykhayliv is a product of the local Lviv youth sportive school system.

He played for Lviv in the Ukrainian Premier League Reserves and in September 2022 Mykhayliv was promoted to the senior squad of this team. He made his debut in the Ukrainian Premier League for Lviv as a second half-time substituted player on 11 September 2022, playing in a losing away match against Dynamo Kyiv.
