= Danylo Kaydalov =

Ukrainian footballer

Danylo Kaidalov
Personal information
- Full name: Danylo Oleksandrovych Kaidalov
- Date of birth: 2 February 2006 (age 20)
- Place of birth: Kharkiv, Ukraine
- Height: 1.79 m (5 ft 10 in)
- Position: Forward

Team information
- Current team: Metalist Kharkiv
- Number: 19

Youth career
- 2014–2015: Youth Sportive School Kharkiv
- 2015–2016: Metalist Kharkiv
- 2016–2018: Vostok Kharkiv
- 2018–2022: Metalist Kharkiv

Senior career*
Years	Team	Apps	(Gls)
2022–	Metalist Kharkiv	56	(8)

International career^{‡}
2022–2023	Ukraine U17	3	(0)
- * Club domestic league appearances and goals as of 4 June 2026 ‡ National team caps and goals as of 8 March 2024

Danylo Oleksandrovych Kaidalov (Ukrainian: Данило Олександрович Кайдалов; born 2 February 2006) is a Ukrainian professional footballer who plays as a forward for Metalist Kharkiv in the Ukrainian First League.

== Club career ==
Born in Kharkiv, Kaydalov began his career in the local Youth Sportive School Kharkiv and Metalist Kharkiv before transferring to the academy of Vostok Kharkiv, returning to Metalist two years later.

He made his debut as a second-half substitute for Metalist Kharkiv in the Ukrainian Premier League against Chornomorets Odesa on 25 November 2022.

== International career ==
In February 2023, Kaydalov was called up to the final squad of the Ukraine under-17 team to play in the 2023 UEFA European Under-17 Championship qualification elite round matches.
