= Andriy Porokhnya =

Ukrainian footballer (born 1997)

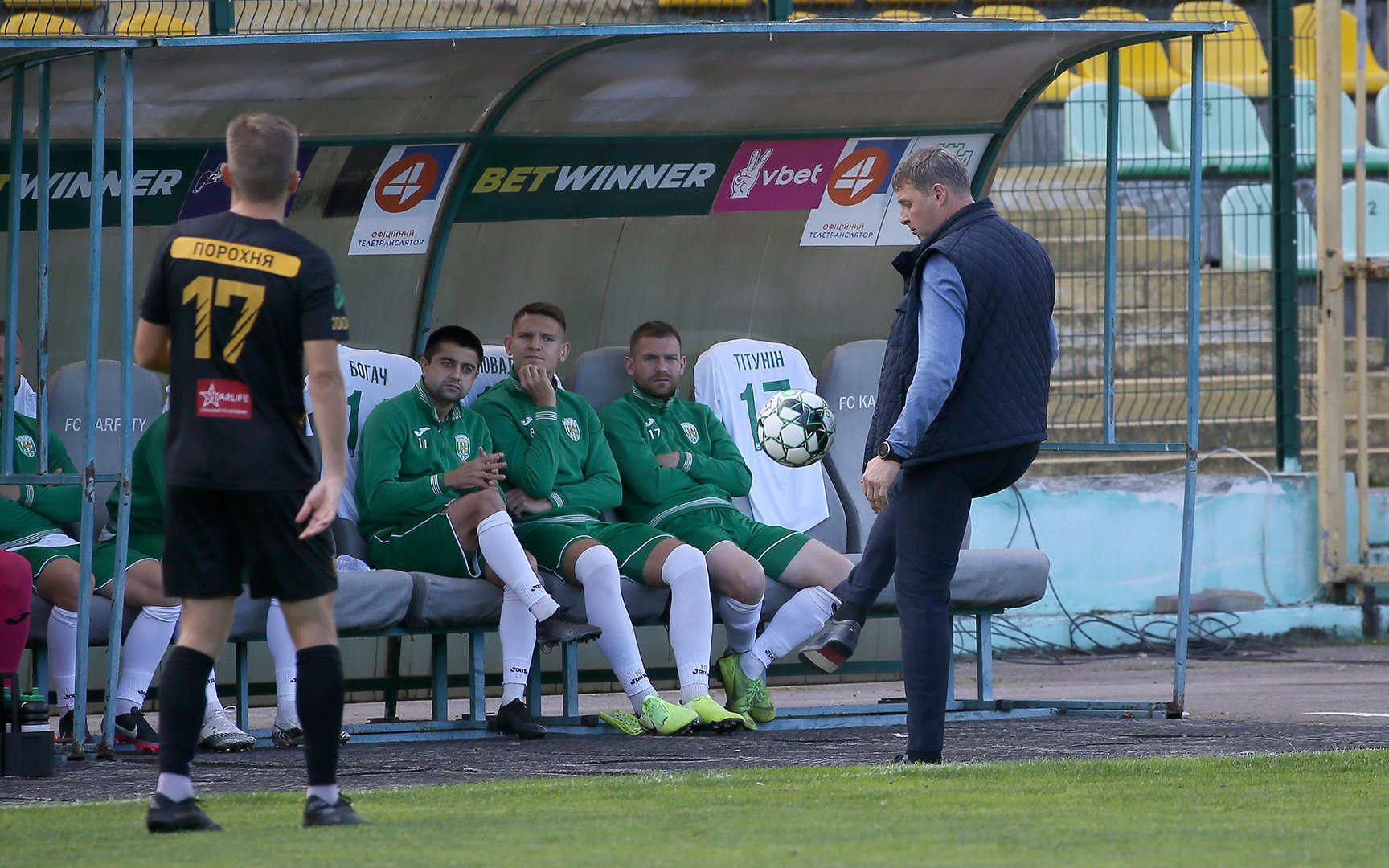

Personal information
- Full name: Andriy Volodymyrovych Porokhnya
- Date of birth: 17 February 1997 (age 29)
- Place of birth: Slavutych, Ukraine
- Height: 1.78 m (5 ft 10 in)
- Position: Midfielder

Team information
- Current team: Chernihiv
- Number: 33

Youth career
- 2011–2014: Yunist Chernihiv

Senior career*
| Years | Team | Apps | (Gls) |
| 2016 | Arsenal Bila Tserkva | 2 | (0) |
| 2020–2021 | Kudrivka | 2 | (0) |
| 2021–2022 | Chernihiv | 15 | (1) |
| 2022–2024 | Druzhba Myrivka | 23 | (4) |
| 2024– | Chernihiv | 52 | (4) |
- * Club domestic league appearances and goals as of 21 November 2026

Andriy Volodymyrovych Porokhnya (Ukrainian: Андрій Володимирович Порохня; born 17 February 1997) is a Ukrainian professional footballer who plays as a midfielder for Chernihiv.

== Career ==
Porokhnya started his football career at Yunist Chernihiv in 2011 before moving to Arsenal Bila Tserkva in 2015. In 2017 he moved to FC Kudrivka.

=== FC Chernihiv ===
On summer 2021, Porokhnya moved to Chernihiv in the Ukrainian Second League. On 24 July he made his debut with the new club against MFA Mukacheve. On 18 August he scored in 2021–22 Ukrainian Cup against Chaika Petropavlivska Borshchahivka. On 31 August he scored his second Ukrainian Cup goal against Alians Lypova Dolyna. On 16 October he scored his first league goal in a 3–0 victory over Lyubomyr Stavyshche. On 10 August 2022 he terminated his contract with the club by mutual consensus.

=== Druzhba Myrivka ===
In summer 2022 he moved to Druzhba Myrivka in the Kyiv Oblast.

=== Second spell at FC Chernihiv ===
In summer 2024 he rejoined FC Chernihiv in the Ukrainian Second League. On 17 September 2022, he scored against Metalist 1925-2 Kharkiv at the Yunist Stadium in Chernihiv. On 30 May 2025, he scored in the first leg of the Play-Offs against Skala Stryi at the Chernihiv Arena. On 27 June 2025 he extended his contract with the club. On 3 August 2025 he made his debut in Ukrainian First League against Probiy Horodenka at the Probiy Arena. On 4 October 2025 he scored his first goal in Ukrainian First League against Podillya Khmelnytskyi at the Chernihiv Arena.

== Career statistics ==
As of match played 21 November 2026

Appearances and goals by club, season and competition
| Club | Season | League | | | Cup | | Europe | | Other | | Total | |
| Club | Season | Division | Apps | Goals | Apps | Goals | Apps | Goals | Apps | Goals | Apps | Goals |
|---|---|---|---|---|---|---|---|---|---|---|---|---|
| Chernihiv | 2021–22 | Ukrainian Second League | 15 | 1 | 2 | 2 | 0 | 0 | 0 | 0 | 17 | 3 |
| Druzhba Myrivka | 2023–24 | Ukrainian Second League | 23 | 4 | 1 | 0 | 0 | 0 | 0 | 0 | 24 | 4 |
| Chernihiv | 2024–25 | Ukrainian Second League | 17 | 3 | 2 | 0 | 0 | 0 | 4 | 1 | 23 | 4 |
| Chernihiv | 2025–26 | Ukrainian First League | 23 | 1 | 5 | 0 | 0 | 0 | 0 | 0 | 28 | 1 |
| Chernihiv | 2026–27 | Ukrainian First League | 12 | 0 | 3 | 0 | 0 | 0 | 0 | 0 | 15 | 0 |
| Career total | | | 89 | 9 | 13 | 2 | 0 | 0 | 4 | 1 | 108 | 12 |

== Honours ==
Inhulets-2 Petrove

- Kirovohrad Oblast Championship: 2015

Druzhba Myrivka

- Ukrainian Second League: 2023–24
- Ukrainian Amateur Cup: 2022–23

Chernihiv

- Ukrainian Cup runner-up: 2025–26

Individual

- Honoured Master of Sport of Ukraine
