= Dmytro Fatyeyev =

Ukrainian footballer (born 1994)

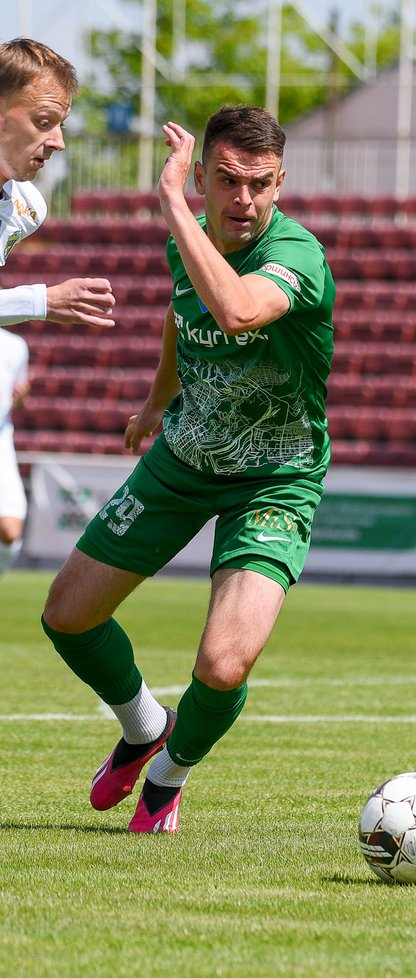

Personal information
- Full name: Dmytro Mykhaylovych Fatyeyev
- Date of birth: 21 June 1994 (age 32)
- Place of birth: Kirovohrad, Ukraine
- Height: 1.83 m (6 ft 0 in)
- Position: Defender

Team information
- Current team: Chernihiv
- Number: 20

Youth career
- 2008–2011: Youth Sportive School #2 Kirovohrad

Senior career*
Years	Team	Apps	(Gls)
2012	Shakhtar-3 Donetsk	2	(1)
2012–2018	Zirka Kropyvnytskyi	87	(5)
2019	Lviv	0	(0)
2019–2020	Inhulets Petrove	18	(1)
2021–2022	Kryvbas Kryvyi Rih	17	(2)
2022	Livyi Bereh Kyiv	0	(0)
2022–2023	Obolon Kyiv	27	(1)
2024	FSC Mariupol	20	(1)
2025–	Chernihiv	39	(2)

International career^{‡}
2013	Ukraine U19	1	(0)
2015	Ukraine U21	4	(0)
- * Club domestic league appearances and goals as of 1 November 2026 ‡ National team caps and goals as of 25 December 2020

Dmytro Mykhaylovych Fatyeyev (Ukrainian: Дмитро Михайлович Фатєєв; born 21 June 1994) is a Ukrainian professional footballer who plays as a defender for Chernihiv.

== Career ==
=== FC Chernihiv ===
On 2 March 2025, he moved to Chernihiv in the Ukrainian Second League. On 11 April 2025, he made his debut with the new club against Lokomotyv Kyiv at the Bannikov Stadium in Kyiv. He helped the club to get third place in the league and get the promotion to Ukrainian First League. On 15 December 2025 he scored his first goal with the new club against Metalurh Zaporizhzhia at the Chernihiv Arena in Chernihiv. On 15 February 2026, he extended his contract with the club. On 25 July 2026, he scored against Lokomotyv Kyiv.

== Career statistics ==
As of match played 1 November 2026

Appearances and goals by club, season and competition
Club	Season	League			Cup		Europe		Other		Total	
Club	Season	Division	Apps	Goals	Apps	Goals	Apps	Goals	Apps	Goals	Apps	Goals
Zirka Kropyvnytskyi	2012–13	Ukrainian First League	4	0	0	0	0	0	0	0	4	0
Zirka Kropyvnytskyi	2013–14	Ukrainian First League	23	3	2	0	0	0	0	0	25	3
Zirka Kropyvnytskyi	2014–15	Ukrainian First League	21	1	1	0	0	0	0	0	22	1
Zirka Kropyvnytskyi	2015–16	Ukrainian First League	15	1	1	0	0	0	0	0	16	1
Zirka Kropyvnytskyi	2016–17	Ukrainian Premier League	14	0	1	0	0	0	0	0	15	0
Zirka Kropyvnytskyi	2017–18	Ukrainian Premier League	10	0	0	0	0	0	0	0	10	0
Lviv	2018–19	Ukrainian Premier League	0	0	0	0	0	0	0	0	0	0
Inhulets Petrove	2019–20	Ukrainian First League	16	1	4	0	0	0	0	0	20	1
Inhulets Petrove	2020–21	Ukrainian Premier League	2	0	1	0	0	0	0	0	3	0
Kryvbas Kryvyi Rih	2020–21	Ukrainian Second League	12	2	0	0	0	0	0	0	12	1
Kryvbas Kryvyi Rih	2021–22	Ukrainian First League	5	0	1	0	0	0	0	0	6	0
Obolon Kyiv	2022–23	Ukrainian First League	10	0	0	0	0	0	0	0	10	0
Obolon Kyiv	2023–24	Ukrainian Premier League	20	1	0	0	0	0	0	0	20	1
FSC Mariupol	2023–24	Ukrainian First League	10	0	2	0	0	0	0	0	12	0
FSC Mariupol	2024–25	Ukrainian First League	10	1	1	0	0	0	0	0	11	1
Chernihiv	2024–25	Ukrainian Second League	6	0	0	0	0	0	4	0	10	0
Chernihiv	2025–26	Ukrainian First League	23	1	3	0	0	0	0	0	26	1
Chernihiv	2026–27	Ukrainian First League	10	1	2	0	0	0	0	0	12	1
Career total			210	12	19	0	0	0	4	0	233	12

== Honours ==
Zirka Kropyvnytskyi

- Ukrainian First League: 2015–16

Chernihiv

- Ukrainian Cup runner-up: 2025–26
