= Mykyta Teplyakov =

Ukrainian footballer

Personal information
- Full name: Mykyta Oleksandrovych Teplyakov
- Date of birth: 18 November 2000 (age 25)
- Place of birth: Korosten, Ukraine
- Height: 1.77 m (5 ft 10 in)
- Position: Defender

Youth career
- –2012: DYuSSh Korosten
- 2013: im. Lva Yashina Kyiv
- 2013–2018: UFK Olimpik Kharkiv

Senior career*
Years	Team	Apps	(Gls)
2018–2019	Kvadro Pervomaiskyi	6	(1)
2019–2020	Sochi	0	(0)
2020–2021	Metal Kharkiv	1	(0)
2021–2022	→ Vovchansk (loan)	7	(1)
2023	Mariupol	22	(2)
2024	Nyva Buzova	9	(0)
2024–2025	Kudrivka	19	(2)
2025–2026	Chernihiv	9	(0)
- * Club domestic league appearances and goals as of 26 May 2026

Mykyta Oleksandrovych Teplyakov or Nikita Teplyakov (Ukrainian: Микита Олександрович Тепляков; born 18 November 2000) is a Ukrainian professional footballer who plays as a defender.

== Club Career ==
=== Early career ===
Native of Korosten, Teplyakov started to play football at local sports school (DYuSSh Korosten). His first coaches were Anatoliy Zhuravskyi and Oleksandr Vyhovskyi.

In 2013-2018 he enrolled into Kharkiv State College of Physical Culture 1 where he played for the college team UFK Olimpik. In 2018 Teplyakov joined his first club Kvadro out of Pervomaiskyi that plays at Kharkiv Oblast Championship. In 2019 he went abroad joining PFC Sochi where he played half of season for the club's youth (U-19) team.

=== FC Metalist Kharkiv ===
In 2020 Teplyakov returned to Ukraine joined the revived FC Metalist Kharkiv that played at the third tier as Metal.

==== FC Vovchansk (Loan) ====
After playing only one game Teplyakov was loaned out to FC Vovchansk which cooperated with Metalist.

=== FSC Mariupol ===
Following the Russian military aggression, he was without club for short while before joining FSC Mariupol in 2023. Due to his performance in the match against Kremin Kremenchuk, he was included in the Best XI of Round 9 of the 2023–24 Ukrainian First League. On 29 November 2023, he scored two goals against Kremin Kremenchuk at the Kremin-Arena. In December 2023, the club has terminated his contract.

=== Nyva Buzova ===
In January 2024 he signed for Nyva Buzova just renamed Kudrivka-Nyva. Mykyta earned 9 caps in the Ukrainian First league.

=== Kudrivka ===
Following the merger between Nyva Buzova and Kudrivka, Mykyta moved to Kudrivka just admitted in Ukrainian First League.

=== FC Chernihiv ===
On 9 January 2025, he signed for Chernihiv in Ukrainian First League. On 18 March 2026 he made his debut for the new club in the Ukrainian Cup against Feniks-Mariupol helping the club qualify for the semi-finals of the competition for the first time in the history of the club. On 26 June 2026 his contract was expired and it wasn't renewed.

== Career statistics ==
=== Club ===
As of match played 26 May 2026

Appearances and goals by club, season and competition
Club	Season	League			Cup		Europe		Other		Total	
Club	Season	Division	Apps	Goals	Apps	Goals	Apps	Goals	Apps	Goals	Apps	Goals
Metal Kharkiv	2020–21	Ukrainian Second League	1	0	0	0	0	0	0	0	1	0
Vovchansk (loan)	2021–22	Ukrainian Second League	7	1	2	0	0	0	0	0	9	1
Mariupol	2022–23	Ukrainian First League	8	0	0	0	0	0	2	0	10	0
Mariupol	2023–24	Ukrainian First League	14	2	4	0	0	0	0	0	18	2
Nyva Buzova	2023–24	Ukrainian Second League	9	0	0	0	0	0	0	0	9	0
Kudrivka	2024–25	Ukrainian First League	19	2	2	0	0	0	0	0	21	2
Chernihiv	2025–26	Ukrainian First League	9	0	2	0	0	0	0	0	11	0
Career total			67	5	10	0	0	0	2	0	79	5

== Honours ==
Chernihiv

- Ukrainian Cup runner-up: 2025–26
