= Honoured Master of Sport of Ukraine =

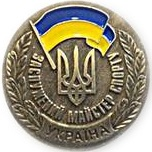
Badge of Honoured Master of Sport of Ukraine

The title of Honoured Master of Sport of Ukraine (abbreviated as HMSU; Ukrainian: Заслужений майстер спорту України) is an honorary sports title established in 1992. With the introduction of the Unified Sports Classification of Ukraine in 2006, it was redefined as a sports title

== Overview ==
The procedure and criteria for awarding or revoking the title are regulated by the Unified Sports Classification of Ukraine (2006). Between 1993 and 2006, the title was governed by the Regulation on the Honorary Title "Honoured Master of Sport of Ukraine" (1993 and 1997 versions). The title is conferred and revoked by the highest government authority overseeing physical culture and sports in Ukraine. It is awarded to Ukrainian citizens only.

According to the 2006 Classification, the HMSU title is awarded "to athletes in individual or team sports as a mark of their personal achievements" upon meeting the prescribed standards. These include:

In Olympic sports:

- Olympic champion, world champion, or Olympic/world medalist;
- Two-time European champion, or one-time European champion (if the championships are held every 2 or 4 years), or three-time
- European medalist; :: In non-Olympic sports (including non-Olympic disciplines of Olympic sports):
- World Games champion or medalist;
- Two-time world champion or three-time world medalist;
- Winner or two-time medalist of the Chess Olympiad; :: In para-sports:
- Two-time gold medalist or three-time medalist of the Paralympic Games, Deaflympics, World or European Championships, or the Chess Olympiad.

Although the Unified Sports Classification of Ukraine (2006) does not formally provide for awarding the HMSU title based on other accomplishments (previously, the title could be granted "based on a combination of results"), some sports have applied additional criteria. For example, in 2009, seventeen footballers of Shakhtar Donetsk were awarded the title for winning the 2008–09 UEFA Cup, including ten players who did not hold Ukrainian citizenship.

According to the 2006 classification, the title of Honoured Master of Sport of Ukraine may be revoked only in cases of a lifetime disqualification for anti-doping rule violations. (Previously, the grounds for revocation were broader.)
